= Bayan Productions =

Philippine television production company

Bayan Productions, Inc. (BPI)
- Type: Television production, subsidiary of ABS-CBN Corporation
- Founded: 1995; 31 years ago
- Founder: Noli de Castro
- Headquarters: Quezon City
- Key people: Noli de Castro (chairman)
- Products: Television programs
- Owner: Noli de Castro
- Parent: ABS-CBN Corporation

Bayan Productions, Inc. is a Philippine television production company established in 1995 and is a partner of ABS-CBN. In collaboration with ABS-CBN News and Current Affairs, the company is in charge of several current affairs programs that are broadcast on ABS-CBN, Kapamilya Channel and A2Z, including Magandang Gabi... Bayan, and its spinoff KBYN: Kaagapay ng Bayan.

Arlene de Castro, who led Bayan Productions until her death on July 31, 2021, was formerly ABS-CBN's vice president for current affairs.

== Shows ==
=== Previous shows ===
==== Co-produced by ABS-CBN News and Current Affairs ====
- KBYN: Kaagapay ng Bayan - a spin-off of Magandang Gabi, Bayan created in cooperation with ABS-CBN News and Current Affairs and hosted by Noli de Castro. The program aired brand-new episodes on the Kapamilya Channel, TeleRadyo, and A2Z from April 10, 2022 through January 1, 2023. Reruns of the program started airing on January 8 to June 11, 2023 and was relegated into a regular segment on TV Patrol titled KBYN Special after de Castro returned to the said newscast. KBYN was replaced by the new show Tao Po! where de Castro also delivers feature stories.

==== In-house current affairs programs ====
- Swak na Swak - a 30-minute business program covering topics including how to establish a business, how to manage money, and how to deal with the growing cost of living, among other things. Bobby Yan was the host of the show. It was shown on ABS-CBN from August 22, 2006 to May 3, 2020, and on Kapamilya Channel and ANC from June 13, 2020 to September 26, 2021.
- Urban Zone (UZ) - a lifestyle show showcasing varied furnishings and architectural styles from various residences. The program was conceptualized, written, created and hosted by Daphne Oseña-Paez. It was shown on ABS-CBN from April 16, 2006 until January 6, 2012.
- Trip na Trip - a travel show focusing on popular and unexplored destinations. Kat de Castro, Kian Kazemi and Uma Khouny served as the hosts. It was shown on ABS-CBN from February 5, 2006 until July 22, 2011.
- Willingly Yours - a public service show hosted by Willie Revillame in which he granted wishes to the underserved people. It was shown on ABS-CBN from August 10, 2002 to November 2003.

=== Documentary specials (under Bayan Productions) ===
- Pinoy Movies: Buhay Ka Pa Ba? - the documentary had its ABS-CBN debut on December 4, 2005, with Vilma Santos and Luis Manzano providing the narration. It covered the situation of Philippine cinema. Before Magandang Gabi, Bayan was canceled, the documentary also functioned as Bayan Productions' first standalone endeavor.
- Kaba, Kutob, Kilabot: Mga Kwentong Kababalaghan - the special, which served as a spin-off of MGB's Halloween specials, had its ABS-CBN debut on October 29, 2006, with hosts Kat de Castro and Albert Martinez. The 1995 Marivic Chan rape-slay case, horror stories from Silliman University, a discussion of demonic possession, and Judge Florentino Floro, dubbed the "Healing Judge," were all topics covered in the presentation.
