= Todo Balita =

Defunct Philippine morning radio newscast

Todo Arangkada Balita
- Other names: Todo Arangkada (1996–2001); Todo Balita (2001–2010; 2010–2013); Arangkada Balita (2013–2015)
- Genre: Newscast, Talk show
- Running time: 2 hours, weekdays (1996-2017); 1 hour, Saturdays (2019-2020)
- Country of origin: Philippines
- Language: Filipino
- Home station: DZMM (1996–2010); Radyo5 92.3 News FM (2010–13); DZRH (as Arangkada Balita, 2013–15); DZRJ-AM (as Todo Arangkada Balita, 2016–17); DZXL (as Todo Arangkada Balita, 2019–20)
- TV adaptations: Todo Balita; ABS-CBN, 2008–10; Todo Arangkada Balita; 8TriTV, 2016
- Hosted by: Neil Ocampo (1996-2020); Various contributors
- Announcer: Peter Musñgi (1996–2010); Martin Andanar and Leddy Tantoco (2010–13); Dennis Antenor, Jr. (2013–15; 2026); Daniel Castro (2016–17); Jenill Demorito and Rod Marcelino (2019–20)
- Created by: Neil Ocampo (1996-2020)
- Recording studio: For ABS-CBN/DZMM; ABS-CBN Broadcasting Center, Sgt. Esguerra Avenue, Quezon City (1996-2010); For Radyo5; 762, Quirino Highway, San Bartolome, Novaliches, Quezon City (2010-13); For DZRH; MBC Building, V. Sotto Street, CCP Complex, Roxas Boulevard, Pasay City (2013-15); For DZRJ/8TriMedia; Seneca Plaza Bldg., E. Rodriguez Avenue, Quezon City (2016-17); For DZXL; 4th Floor, Guadalupe Commercial Complex, EDSA, Brgy. Guadalupe Nuevo, Makati City (2019-2020)
- Original release: 1996 – March 28, 2020
- Opening theme: Theme from Hawaii-Five-O (1996-2020)
- Other themes: Todo Balita by Abra (2010-13, recommissioned 2017)

Todo Balita (last broadcast under the name Todo Arangkada Balita and formerly Arangkada Balita) was a Philippine talk radio show broadcast by DZMM Radyo Patrol 630, DZMM TeleRadyo, ABS-CBN, Radyo5, DZRH, RHTV/DZRH News Television, DZRJ, 8TriTV, and DZXL, Anchored by Neil Ocampo. it first aired on DZMM Radyo Patrol 630, DZMM TeleRadyo and ABS-CBN from 1996 to July 9, 2010, replacing Kabayan and was replaced by Kabayan. The show moved to Radyo5 from November 8, 2010 to 2013, DZRH and RHTV (later DZRH News Television) from 2013 to 2015, DZRJ and 8TriTV from November 7, 2016 to December 8, 2017, and DZXL from October 19, 2019 to March 28, 2020.

The program departed from the usual seriously formatted news/talk programs as it interjected light-hearted banters by the host and his vocal impersonations, earning Ocampo the nickname Total News-Tertainer.

== Program history ==
=== Background ===
Neil Ocampo transferred to DZMM from RMN's DZXL months after the 1986 People Power Revolution as one of the station's first batch of recruited Radyo Patrol reporters. By 1990, he was given his first regular hosting spot on DZMM's mid-morning timeslot (11 AM to 1 PM, including a 15-minute noontime newscast) with Gel Santos-Relos as co-anchor, but the pairing did not last. In 1993, Ocampo eventually given an evening timeslot for his eponymous "Oh Yes! It's Neil Ocampo!" after serving as pinch hitter for the station's other programs in the intervening years following the dissolution of his pairing with Santos-Relos.

=== 1996-2001: Todo Arangkada ===
In 1996, Ocampo was moved back to the mid-morning timeslot as host of Todo Arangkada that ran every Monday to Friday from 10:00 am to 12:00 noon and every Saturday from 10:00 am to 11:00 am. Todo Arangkada served as the originating show for most of the host's voice impersonations as it combined straight news commentary and light banter.

=== 2001-2010: Todo Balita on DZMM ===
With Noli de Castro's candidacy for the Senate in the 2001 elections, DZMM's management promoted Ocampo to the vacated morning primetime slot (5:00 - 7:00 am) and Todo Arangkada was relaunched on March 5, 2001, as Todo Balita.

Upon the launch of DZMM's cable television counterpart on April 12, 2007, Todo Balita's unique programming style posed a problem to management on how it could be successfully parlayed to cable television audiences without running the risk of destroying the program's patented illusion. Marah Faner-Capuyan would recount on DZMM's 30th anniversary documentary 30/630: Kwento ng Tatlong Dekada that the station's graphics team had to make photographed caricatures of Ocampo's vocal impersonations at first, but by the latter half of TeleRadyo's first year of broadcast, the control room would relent in showing Ocampo on-camera as viewers had taken notice of the program being broadcast live but still without the studio being seen, contrary to the channel's intended purpose.

In 2008, Todo Balita's first 15 minutes began to be simulcast over ABS-CBN as a lead-in to Umagang Kay Ganda.

Ocampo took a leave from DZMM in November 2009 to run for mayor of Marilao, Bulacan, but was eventually defeated. In the interim, the show continued with rotating anchors as a straight-forward news and commentary program until the hosting reins went permanently to Vic Lima and David Oro.

Todo Balita aired its last DZMM broadcast on July 9, 2010, in preparation for the return of Noli de Castro's Kabayan.

=== 2010-13: Radyo5 92.3 News FM ===
Todo Balita was relaunched on Radyo5 92.3 News FM on November 8, 2010, with Ocampo returning as host. In an interview by the Philippine Entertainment Portal, Ocampo disclosed that the impetus for his transfer to TV5's FM venture was refusing an offer by DZMM for his program to occupy the 3:00 - 5:00 am slot as de Castro's lead-in, as he felt that the timing was too early and unfit for his program's format. Coinciding with the transfer was an article by The Philippine Star nicknaming Ocampo as a "newstertainer", a monicker that stuck for the rest of his career.

The program remained intact with additional segments such as HBO: Hambalos Banat On-the-Spot and CNN: Commentary ni Neil. It also brought minor changes to the names of the characters impersonated by Ocampo

In April 2013, Todo Balita aired its last broadcast on Radyo5 due to undisclosed reasons. The 6:00 am weekday spot was eventually renamed to Radyo Singko Balita with Ocampo's relief anchor Joel Gorospe serving as host. On June 17, 2013, its timeslot was permanently taken over by Orly Mercado: All Ready! with Orly Mercado.

During its run on FM radio, the program commissioned an intro rap jingle that lasted from 2011 to 2013.

=== 2013-15: Arangkada Balita ===
After leaving Radyo5 92.3 News FM, Neil Ocampo moved to DZRH as host of the 5:00 am Arangkada Balita and the 6:30 am ACS Balita every weekdays. During its run on the station, the show was also a springboard for the network's anniversary specials every July.

By 2015, the anchorman would depart from DZRH, citing an indefinite leave.

=== 2016-17: Todo Arangkada Balita on DZRJ ===
In August 2016, the then-58 year-old anchorman was unveiled in a press conference as a veteran recruit of Kaye Dacer's 8TriMedia Broadcasting. He returned on the air three months later (November 7) on DZRJ-AM under 8TriMedia's airtime lease through the third iteration of Todo Balita as Todo Arangkada Balita airing weekdays at 8:00 am to 10:00 am with the long-running format being carried over.

Weeks into the program's run, 8TriMedia planned to move Ocampo to the 6:00 PM slot by December 2016 to compete with national TV newscasts simulcast on AM stations, but never materialized.

On March 14, 2017, Todo Arangkada Balita recommissioned its rap jingle, albeit removing stanzas that referenced Radyo5. However, on December 8, 2017, the program unceremoniously ended on DZRJ after the station terminated 8TriMedia's blocktime agreement. Furthermore, Ocampo went into a sabbatical as the program was excluded from the ensuing integration made by DZRJ for 8TriMedia personnel affected by the displaced lease.

=== 2019-2020: Todo Arangkada Balita on DZXL ===
In the latter part of September 2019, RMN's DZXL ran promotions of Neil Ocampo's return to broadcasting which materialized on October 19.

Todo Arangkada Balita: The New Generation initially ran Saturdays at 10:00 am to noon until it was reduced to an hour by January 2020 when the program Bisaya Gyud! of then-incumbent PCO Secretary Martin Andanar bought the 11:00 am slot as a blocktimer. Notwithstanding the reduction to a weekly broadcast, its erstwhile format remained intact.

Ocampo hosted the broadcast until February 29, 2020 - three weeks before the imposition of the enhanced community quarantine in response to the COVID-19 pandemic in the Philippines. Owing to both the government restrictions and his failing health which prompted the medical hiatus, the anchor chair went to Rod Marcelino as a fill-in for the next four Saturdays until it was quietly cancelled after the March 28 broadcast.

Ocampo died of heart failure on August 10, 2020, in Angeles, Pampanga.

== Format ==
Todo Balita deviated from the usual straightforward news-talk format as the host interjected light-hearted and playful banter with his various vocal impersonations that became a hit to the public as the characters were often the ones throwing the praises and/or jibes about the topic at hand while Ocampo served as the straight man.

During his absence for illness or special assignments, the program is presented in a straightforward style with the substitute as a sole host.

=== Characters/Vocal impersonations ===
Name	Notes
Mang Tonyo/Jejemon Tonyo	Ocampo's caricature for the middle-aged everyman and the most recognized of his impressions. He addresses the public as "mga anak" (children) and often threw the most diatribes on a controversial topic Ocampo's "Mang Tonyo" impression also appeared on Hoy Gising! in the late 1990s.
Tongressman Manhik Manaog (1996–2009) / Tongressman Abnoy Atras Abante (2010–2020)	Both iterations of the "Tongressman" spoke in a heavy Batangas Tagalog accent resembling that of actor Leo Martinez. His comedic backstory often describes the Tongressman as having been previously jailed. Tongressman Abnoy serves as a more formal and restrained counter to Mang Tonyo's no-holds barred jabs
Kiskis Flavor	An anagram to then-DOH Secretary and later Senator Juan Flavier, Kiskis Flavor often was the show's "insider" in an incumbent administration's cabinet

Other minor recurring characters were "Pareng Erap" (parodying Joseph Estrada) "Dugong Diokterte" (a parody of Rodrigo Duterte) and Bato Bato Pick (a pun on then-Philippine National Police chief Ronald dela Rosa). However, Ocampo would sometimes mimic real-life competitors like Rey Langit or play one of his characters during introductions to a live field report.

== Hosts ==
=== Main host ===
- Neil Ocampo

=== Substitute and former presenters ===
==== DZMM ====
- Vic Lima (2009–2010)
- David Oro (2009–2010)
- Nelson Lubao (substitute, 2001–2009)
- Cheryl Cosim (rotating anchor, 2009)

==== Radyo5 ====
- Benjie Felipe (a.k.a. Tsongkibenj) - Todo Showbiz segment Anchor
- Joel Gorospe (2013 Moved to DWIZ 882 since 2026)
- JV Arcena (substitute, 2012–2013)
- Leddy Tantoco (substitute, 2011)

==== DZRH ====
- Nino Padilla (substitute, 2013–2014)
- Dennis Antenor Jr. (substitute, 2013–2014)
- Andy Vital (substitute, 2013–2014)
- Florante Rosales (substitute, 2014–2015)
- Raymond Dadpass (substitute, 2014–2015)
- Rey Sibayan (substitute, 2014–2015)

==== DZRJ ====
- Melchor Bentican-Balawas (substitute, 2016–2017)
- Gani Oro (substitute, 2016–2017)

==== DZXL ====
- Rod Marcelino (substitute, March 7–28, 2020)

== See also ==
- List of programs broadcast by ABS-CBN
