= Neil Ocampo =

Filipino journalist (1958–2020)

- Born: March 3, 1958; Plaridel, Quezon, Philippines
- Died: August 14, 2020 (aged 62); Angeles, Pampanga, Philippines
- Occupation: Broadcast journalist
- Years active: 1980–2020
- Known for: Anchorman of Todo Balita

Neil Ocampo (March 3, 1958 – August 14, 2020), was a Filipino anchorman, self-styled as the 'Total News-Tertainer' (a portmanteau of "newscaster" and "entertainer") in the Philippine radio broadcast industry. He is known for his morning introduction of "Magandang magandang magandang... umaga po!" and popularized the theme from Hawaii Five O which became his radio program's signature tune.

His radio program, Todo Arangkada Balita was one of the longest running morning drive-time programs in the Philippines.

== Early life and career ==
Ocampo was born on March 3, 1958, in Plaridel, Quezon. He started his broadcast career on DZXL in 1980 while studying engineering courses at the FEATI University. He then moved to DZMM after the 1986 People Power Revolution. Prior to his promotion as a radio anchorman, he was one of the pioneer reporters of DZMM as 'Radyo Patrol #5'.

He first handled the evening program "Oh Yes, It's Neil Ocampo!" prior to 1996 when he was moved to the 10:00 am timeslot under the program Todo Arangkada where he first utilized what became his trademark of voice impersonations of politicians and personalities including Jejemon Tonyo, Tongressman Atras Abante, Kiskis Flavor and Pareng Erap, and his long morning greeting introduction at the start of the program.

Todo Arangkada later became Todo Balita in March 2001, airing at the 5:00 am timeslot, lasting from 2001 to 2009.

In late 2009, Ocampo announced his intention to run for Mayor of Marilao, Bulacan under the Nacionalista Party in the 2010 national elections, but lost in the mayoralty race.

On November 8, 2010, he transferred from DZMM to Radyo5 92.3 News FM (now 105.9 True FM) as the anchor of the revived Todo Balita. Before he decided to move to the newly launched FM news station of TV5, the management of DZMM offered Ocampo the 3:00 a.m. to 5:00 a.m. timeslot. Insiders within the station disclosed that the popular anchorman was the top choice to serve as a strong lead-in to the returning Noli de Castro and his show Kabayan after his term as Vice President of the Philippines. Ocampo personally declined the offer.

In May 2013, Ocampo transferred to DZRH as the anchor of morning news program Arangkada Balita until 2015 when he underwent an indefinite leave from the job. On November 7, 2016, he transferred to DZRJ 810 AM as anchor of the program "Todo Arangkada Balita", where he introduced two new voice impersonations imitating President Rodrigo Duterte (as Dugong Diokterte) and Philippine National Police Chief (now Senator) Ronald dela Rosa (as Gen. Bato-Bato Pik). 8TriMedia initially planned to move Ocampo by December 2016 to the 6:00 p.m. to 8:00 p.m. to compete against two primetime TV newscasts that were simulcast on their own flagship radio stations, but plans never materialized.

His stint on DZRJ lasted until December 5, 2017, when 8TriMedia was axed from the station's time-brokerage agreement due to the firm's unpaid debts. The show was not part of the absorption of the majority of 8TriMedia shows and personnel by DZRJ. At this point, he went on hiatus.

On October 19, 2019, Ocampo returned to DZXL under its Radyo Trabaho brand through 'Todo Arangkada Balita' on a weekly schedule from 10:00 am to noon. By January 2020, however the show was reduced to an hour to give way to Bisaya Gyud! at the 11:00 am slot, a blocktimer hosted by Presidential Communications Operations Office secretary Martin Andanar. Todo Arangkada Balita under Ocampo lasted until February 29, 2020, three weeks before the imposition of the enhanced community quarantine due to the COVID-19 pandemic. Owing to both the restrictions and his failing health, he was substituted by Rod Marcelino until March 28 when the program was quietly folded.

== Personal life ==
Ocampo had four sons.

He died on August 10, 2020, in Angeles, Pampanga, due to heart failure. His son Aristotle "Aris" Ocampo confirmed the development; the wake was to be only limited to his immediate family.
