= Philippine Information Agency =

Philippine state news agency

- Logo

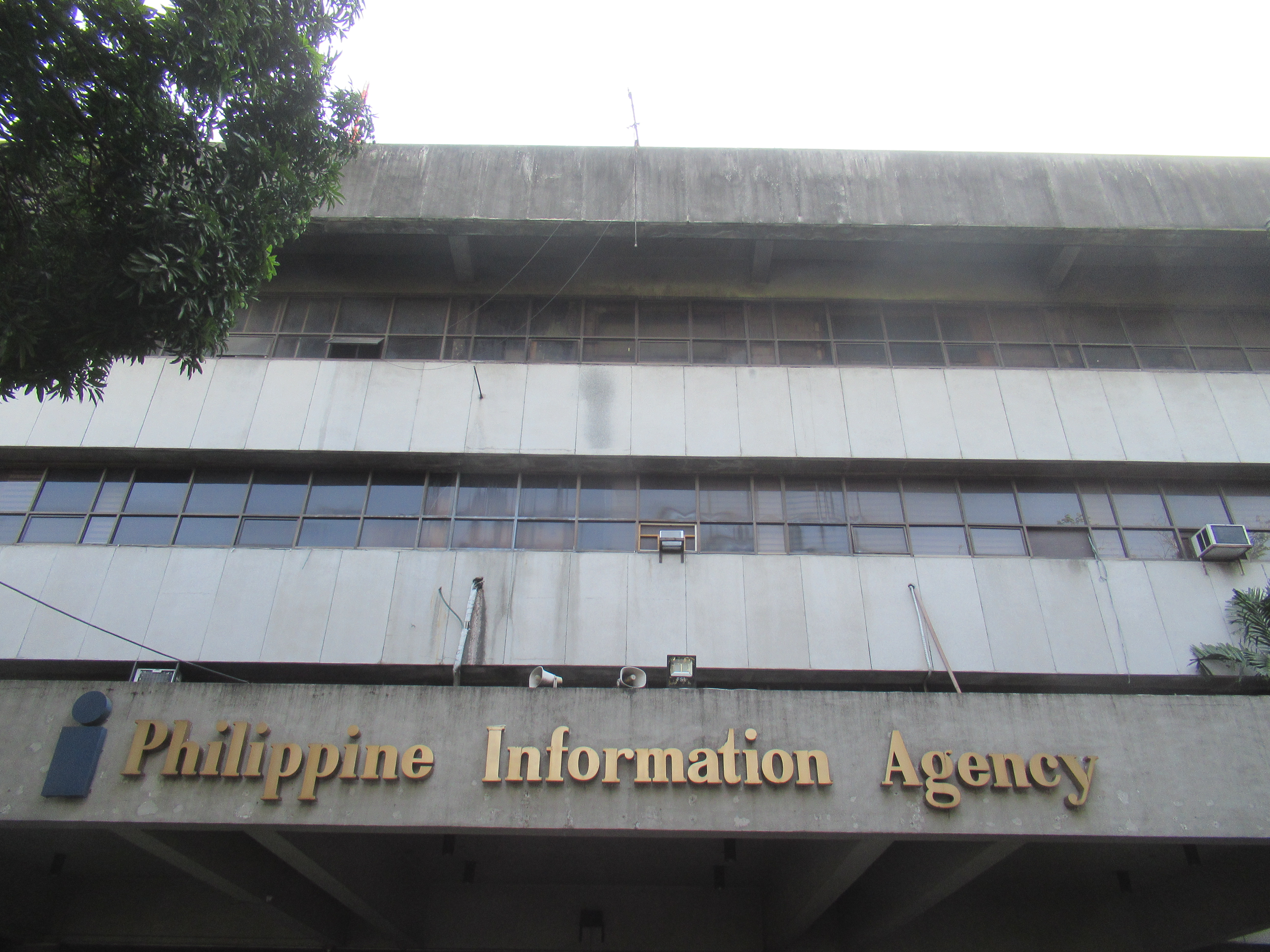

Agency overview
- Type: Public relations / State media
- Jurisdiction: Philippines
- Employees: 374 (2024)
- Agency executives: Director General; Katherine Chloe S. De Castro
- Parent agency: Presidential Communications Office
- Website: www.pia.gov.ph

Philippine Information Agency is a state news agency of the Philippines.

== History ==
The Philippine Information Agency (PIA) was established on December 24, 1986, via Executive Order No. 100 by President Corazon Aquino as the main arm for public information dissemination by the Philippine government. It replaced the National Media Production Center which existed mostly during the presidency of Ferdinand Marcos.

PIA, having a chain of provincial branches nationwide, was reportedly the largest organization within the Office of the Press Secretary (OPS) at the time President Gloria Macapagal Arroyo, in her first year in office, ordered its transfer from the OPS to the Presidential Management Staff.

President Arroyo on March 6, 2006 created the Communications Group within the Office of the President (OP) through Executive Order No. 13 placing the PIA within it. Through Executive Order No. 576 of November 7, 2006 the Government Mass Media Group was abolished, empowering the PIA to have access to government media for the purpose of disseminating development-oriented information.

In 2010, President Benigno Aquino III created the Presidential Communications Operations Office (PCOO) which the PIA became part of.

In July 2022, President Bongbong Marcos through Executive Order No. 2 placed the PIA under the direct supervision of the OP and absorbed offices previously under the PCOO, namely the Bureau of Communications Services, the Freedom of Information – Project Management Office, and the Good Governance Office.

== Director Generals ==
- Noel Tolentino (during the Aquino presidency)
- William M. Esposo (January–October 1988)
- Honesto M. Isleta (by 1997)
- Joel Paredes (during the Estrada presidency)
- Dave Gomez (until late 2001)
- Bobby Capco (Officer in Charge; late 2001)
- Renato S. Velasco (August 24, 2002 – February 6, 2006)
- Conrado Limcaoco (March 1, 2006 – June 16, 2010)
- Jose Mari Oquiñena (January 2013 – ?)
- Harold Clavite (July 2016 – August 30, 2019)
- Ramon Lee Cualoping III (July 7, 2020–May 29, 2023)
- Joe Torres (May 29, 2023–October 3, 2024)
- Katherine Chloe S. De Castro (October 3, 2024 –)
