= Kian Kazemi =

Filipino actor (born 1986)

- Born: January 26, 1986 (age 40)
- Occupations: Actor, television personality
- Years active: 2007–2010, 2014

Kian Reza Kazemi (born January 26, 1986) is a Filipino actor and television personality.

== Life and career ==
Kazemi's father is Iranian and his mother Charito is a Filipina of mixed Spanish descent. His father is in the Persian carpet business. He owns and manages Persia Grill.

== Filmography ==
=== Television ===
Year	Title	Role	Notes	Ref.
2007	Pinoy Big Brother	Himself / Housemate	Evicted on day 49. Returned to the House on Day 78 and was re-evicted on Day 98.	
2008	My Girl	Ex-boyfriend of Nico's girl		
2008	Kung Fu Kids	Teban		
2008–2010	Trip na Trip	Himself	Originally a temporary host replacing Jason Gainza, who was busy with other projects at that time. He became a regular host later on.	
2009	Tayong Dalawa	Lt. Paul Isidro		
2009	Flash Bomba	Jake		
2009	Maalaala Mo Kaya	Young Domeng	Episode: "Tasa"	
2009	Precious Hearts Romances Presents: Bud Brothers	Damien		
2009	The Wedding	Von		
2010	Habang May Buhay	Milo		

=== Film ===
Year	Title	Role	Notes	Ref.
2008	My Big Love	Pilo		
2014	Trophy Wife			

== Awards and nominations ==
Year	Work	Award	Category	Result	Ref.
2011	Trip na Trip	PMPC Star Awards for Television	Best Travel Show Host (with Kat de Castro, Jason Gainza, Franzen Fajardo and Uma Khouny)	Won	
