= PMPC Star Award for Best Lifestyle Show =

The PMPC Star Award for Best Lifestyle Show is given to the best television lifestyle programming of the year and also lifestyle show hosts.

== Winners ==
=== Lifestyle Shows ===
2001: Beauty School Plus (RPN 9)

2002: F (ABS-CBN 2)

2003: F (ABS-CBN 2)

2004: At Home Ka Dito (ABS-CBN 2)

2005: At Home Ka Dito (ABS-CBN 2)

2006: Gandang Ricky Reyes (QTV 11)

2007: At Home Ka Dito (ABS-CBN 2)

2008: Living It Up (Q 11)

2009: Events Incorporated (Q 11)

2010: Us Girls (Studio 23)

2011: Us Girls (Studio 23)

2012: Landmarks (Net 25) as "Best Lifestyle/Travel Show"

2013: Convergence (Net 25)

2014: Gandang Ricky Reyes (GMA News TV)

2015: Gandang Ricky Reyes (GMA News TV)

2016: RX Plus (ABS-CBN S+A)

2017: The World of Gandang Ricky Reyes (GMA News TV)

2018: The World of Gandang Ricky Reyes (GMA News TV)

2019: The World of Gandang Ricky Reyes (GMA News TV)

2020: Taste Buddies (GMA News TV)

2021: Taste Buddies (GTV 27)

2023: Pinas Sarap (GTV 27) as "Best Lifestyle/Travel Show"

2024: I Heart PH (GTV 27) as "Best Lifestyle/Travel Show"

=== Lifestyle Show Hosts ===
2001: Ricky Reyes (Beauty School Plus / RPN 9)

2002: Angel Aquino, Cher Calvin and Daphne Oseña (F / ABS-CBN 2)

2003: Angel Aquino, Cher Calvin and Daphne Oseña (F / ABS-CBN 2)

2004: Angel Aquino, Amanda Griffin and Daphne Oseña (F / ABS-CBN 2) & Charlene Gonzalez (At Home Ka Dito / ABS-CBN 2) [tied]

2005: Charlene Gonzalez (At Home Ka Dito / ABS-CBN 2)

2006: Ricky Reyes (Gandang Ricky Reyes / QTV 11)

2007: Gaby dela Merced, Raymond Gutierrez, Issa Litton and Tim Yap (Living It Up / Q 11)

2008: Raymond Gutierrez, Issa Litton, Sam Oh and Tim Yap (Living It Up / Q 11)

2009: Sam Oh and Tim Yap (Events Incorporated / Q 11)

2010: Ricky Reyes (Life and Style / Q 11)

2011: Angel Aquino, Iya Villania and Cheska Garcia (Us Girls / Studio 23)

2012: Richard Gutierrez (Pinoy Adventure / GMA 7) as "Best Lifestyle/Travel Show Host"

2013: Solenn Heussaff (Fashbook / GMA News TV)

2014: Kris Aquino (Kris TV / ABS-CBN)

2015: Kris Aquino (Kris TV / ABS-CBN)

2016: Ricky Reyes (Gandang Ricky Reyes / GMA News TV)

2017: Solenn Heussaff and Rhian Ramos (Taste Buddies / GMA News TV)

2018: Ricky Reyes (The World of Gandang Ricky Reyes / GMA News TV)

2019: Ricky Reyes (The World of Gandang Ricky Reyes / GMA News TV)

2020: Gil Cuerva and Solenn Heussaff (Taste Buddies / GMA News TV)

2021: Dianne Medina (Loving What You Do / GTV 27)

2023: Kara David (Pinas Sarap / GTV 27) as "Best Lifestyle/Travel Show Host"

2024: Marie Lozano (The Lifestyle Lab / Bilyonaryo News Channel) as "Best Lifestyle/Travel Show Host"

=== Total of number of awardees ===
Ricky Reyes - 6 awards (solo)

Angel Aquino - 4 awards (shared)

Daphne Oseña - 3 awards (shared)

Tim Yap - 3 awards (shared)

Solenn Heussaff - 3 awards (shared)

Sam Oh - 2 awards (shared)

Cher Calvin - 2 awards (shared)

Kris Aquino - 2 awards (solo)

Raymond Gutierrez - 2 awards (shared)

Charlene Gonzalez - 2 awards (solo)

Issa Litton - 2 awards (shared)
