= Kabayan (radio program) =

Kabayan: Kapangyarihan ng Mamamayan, Balita at Talakayan
- Title card since 2020
- Genre: News, talk show, and public service
- Running time: 120 minutes (1986–2001; 2010–2020); 60 minutes (2020–2024; since 2025); 90 minutes (2024–25)
- Country of origin: Philippines
- Language: Filipino
- Home station: DZMM Radyo Patrol 630 (1986–2001; 2010–2020; 2025–present); DWPM Radyo 630 (2023–2025)
- TV adaptations: DZMM TeleRadyo (2010–2020; 2025–present); ABS-CBN (2010, 2020); TeleRadyo (2020–2023); Kapamilya Channel (2020–2023); TeleRadyo Serbisyo; PRTV Prime Media (2024–present)
- Hosted by: Noli de Castro
- Created by: ABS-CBN News and Current Affairs
- Narrated by: Peter Musñgi
- Original release: July 22, 1986 – present

Kabayan (stylized in all caps) (Note: A backronym of KApangyarihan ng mamamayan, BAlita at talakaYAN (lit. 'Power of the People, News and Discussion'), and also a reference to Noli de Castro's nickname, "Kabayan".) is a Philippine radio news and public affairs program created by ABS-CBN News and Current Affairs and hosted by Noli de Castro. It premiered on DZMM Radyo Patrol 630 on July 22, 1986, airing until February 12, 2001, when it was replaced by Todo Balita. The program returned in 2010 and is currently broadcast on DZMM Radyo Patrol 630 (DWPM), TeleRadyo, and PRTV Prime Media. Over the course of its run, it has also aired on ABS-CBN, ANC, Kapamilya Channel, Radyo 630, and TeleRadyo Serbisyo.

== History ==
Kabayan (Kapangyarihan ng Mamamayan, Balita at Talakayan) originally premiered in late 1986 on DZMM with Noli de Castro as host of the program, coinciding with his reassignment from the station's late afternoon slot to early mornings after Radyo Patrol sa Madaling Araw helmed by Lito Villarosa.

The program primarily focused on issues relating to the political and social situation in the Philippines especially timing its launch during the early months of the Corazon Aquino presidency for expanded interviews and listener call-ins for their opinion about the topic at hand. Its efforts resulted to the show becoming DZMM's top-rating radio program.

In February 2001, Kabayan had to end its run as de Castro ran and eventually topped the Senatorial campaign. Neil Ocampo and Todo Balita took over the timeslot.

On July 12, 2010, Kabayan relaunched with de Castro on DZMM, replacing Todo Balita on the 5:00 a.m. to 7:00 a.m. time slot. During this period, its first 15 minutes was also simulcast on free-to-air television via ABS-CBN. On January 10, 2011, the program was moved to the 6:00 a.m. to 8:00 a.m. time slot, combining it with Radyo Patrol Balita: Alas Siyete, wherein de Castro joined Ted Failon as the co-anchor of the newscast from 7:00 a.m. to 7:30 a.m.; Failon also co-anchored with de Castro for Kabayan's 7:30 a.m. extension. In January 2020, the program updated its OBB and title card on DZMM TeleRadyo, in preparation for the 10th anniversary celebration of the program's return to air.

From March 18 to May 1, 2020, Kabayan and Radyo Patrol Balita Alas-Siyete were simulcast on ABS-CBN from 6:00 a.m. to 8:00 a.m., temporarily replacing Umagang Kay Ganda as provisional programming, due to the enhanced community quarantine in Luzon as a result of the COVID-19 pandemic. The program was also simulcast alongside Radyo Patrol Balita: Alas Siyete from June 15 to September 18, 2020, on Kapamilya Channel.

On September 21, 2020, Kabayan was moved to 8:00 am, on a reduced runtime of one hour, to make way for the return of Gising Pilipinas at 6:00 am. The move temporarily ended its simulcast on Kapamilya Channel before resuming again on October 26 as the outlet expanded its daily simulcast of TeleRadyo from two to three hours.

On October 7, 2021, the program ended its broadcast for the second time as de Castro left the network to run for senator once again. TeleRadyo's special coverage of the last day of filing of certificate of candidacies for the 2022 elections took over the timeslot the following day with On The Spot, hosted by Tony Velasquez expanding to the vacated slot on October 11. However, de Castro withdrew his candidacy on October 13, Kabayan returned on November 8, regaining the status quo.

On May 27, 2022, the program returned to digital free-to-air television after 2 years until November 1 of the same year as a digital subchannel of A2Z, where the licensing agreement with ZOE Broadcasting Network got expired on the latter date.

Originally, Kabayan, along with other TeleRadyo programs, were slated to air their respective final live broadcasts on TeleRadyo and Kapamilya Channel effective June 29, 2023, after ABS-CBN announced its planned cessation of the channel's broadcast operations on pay TV and satellite. However, a few days before its closure, the network backtracked and announced instead that the program would continue to broadcast, this time on TeleRadyo Serbisyo and DWPM - properties operated conjointly by ABS-CBN News and the Philippine Collective Media Corporation, marking Kabayan's return to AM radio starting June 30 after three years of absence.

On May 27, 2024, the program began its simulcast on the newly launched PRTV Prime Media, marking its return to free TV after nearly 2 years.

In January 2025, de Castro took a temporary leave from the program, with Danny Buenafe being the interim anchor. On May 29, 2025, the program was carried over to the rebranded DZMM on the same frequency. On June 2, 2025, the program has moved to the 10:00 a.m. to 11:00 a.m. time slot, thus reverting the program to 1 hour, replacing Tatak: Serbisyo.

== Format ==
Kabayan is a commentary program where de Castro tackles the latest issues.

Among the notable features of the program was its signature closing song, What a Wonderful World by Louis Armstrong and Kenny G. The ending song was temporarily shelved in January 2019 and replaced by random old songs chosen by de Castro. However, it was reverted to What a Wonderful World after a few weeks. It lasted until May 8, 2020 when the song was replaced by Kapamilya Forever, in support of ABS-CBN and DZMM when both stations were closed due to a cease and desist order issued by the NTC. However, in 2021, the closing song had its replacement, Feel Good Pilipinas by KZ Tandingan and BGYO, until it was temporarily replaced by various ABS-CBN promotional compositions for summer, monsoon and yuletide seasons, except when the program runs overtime. On July 11, 2023, coinciding with the program returning to AM radio, the original signature closing song was reinstated.

From 2011 to 2020, Kabayan and Radyo Patrol Balita: Alas Siyete were integrated wherein de Castro joined Ted Failon as the 7:00 AM newscast's co-anchor.

On occasions when de Castro would not appear on the program due to special assignments, health concerns, and other days off, an alternate anchor would host the program. Prior to the show moving to its current 8:00 am timeslot, the 7:00 am newscast would be anchored by Failon (until August 31, 2020) and the designated substitute.

Among de Castro's current and former substitute presenters were the late Lito Villarosa, Ted Failon, Erwin Tulfo, Cheryl Cosim, Ricky Rosales and Gerry Baja - with Villarosa being the most notable due to his vocal timbre's resemblance with de Castro; this lasted until 1993 when his role as a lead reliever was taken over by Ted Failon. De Castro would recount during DZMM's 30th anniversary specials in 2016 as well as the accompanying 30/630: Tatlong Dekada ng DZMM documentary that his running gag on such absences during the early years of the show was to remind Villarosa (a fellow native of Mindoro) not to introduce himself by name as a relief anchor using his similar vocal timbre to create an impression for listeners that de Castro was always present on the show.

== Anchors ==
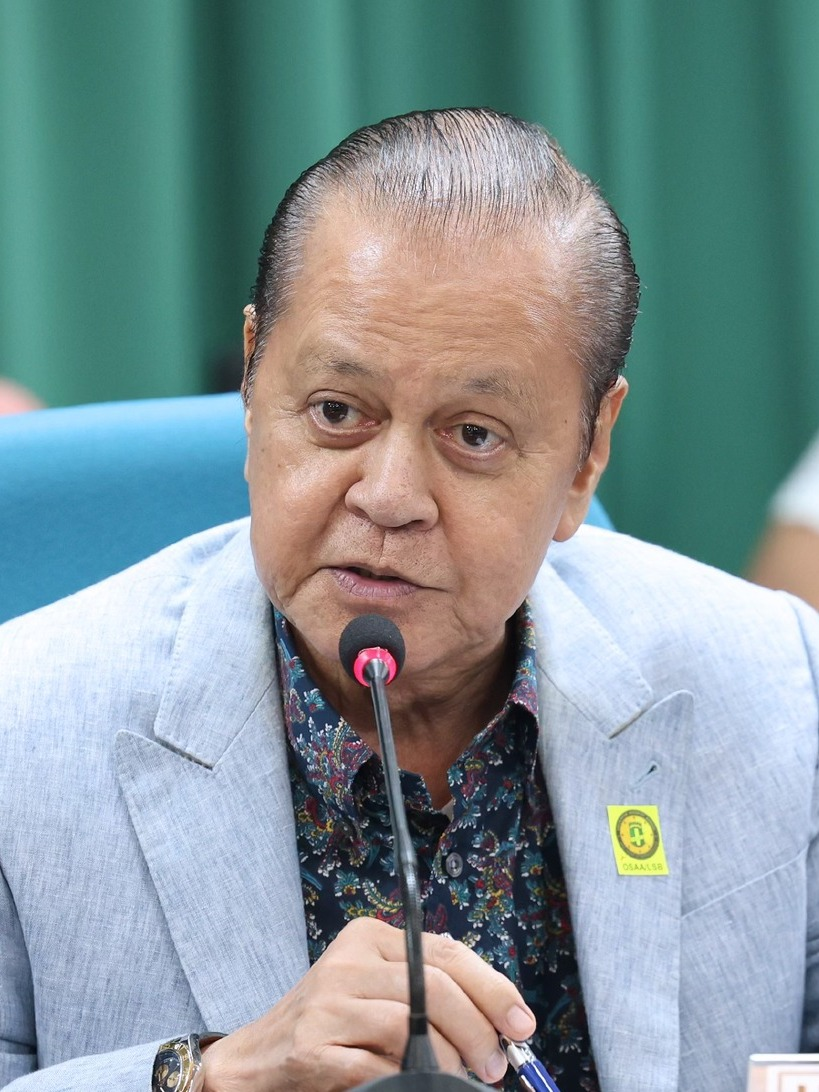
Noli de Castro serves as the anchor of the program.

- Noli de Castro (1986–2001, 2010–2021, 2021–present on hiatus)

Substitute anchors

- Danny Buenafe
- Adrian Ayalin
- Johnson Manabat
- Alvin Elchico
- Robert Mano
- Tony Velasquez
- Doris Bigornia
- Jeff Canoy
- Peter Musñgi
- Rica Lazo
- Amy Perez
- Marlene Padiernos
- Nico Bagsic
- Steve Raz
- Christian Yosores
- Katrina Domingo
- Jing Magsaysay
- Lyza Aquino
- Jeck Batallones
- Jessie Cruzat

Former anchors

- Ted Failon (2011–20)
- Erwin Tulfo (1996–2001)
- Cheryl Cosim (1996–2001)
- Lito Villarosa (1986–93)
- Gerry Baja (1993–2001, 2010–20)
- Joyce Balancio (2017–24)
- Henry Omaga-Diaz (1995–2001, 2010–24)
- Sherrie Ann Torres (2016–24)
- Jonathan Magistrado (2023–24)
- Ricky Rosales (2010–22, 2024–26)

== Awards ==
- Finalist of 2012 New York Festival (NYF) for World's Best Radio Program

== See also ==
- DZMM (under ABS-CBN)
- DZMM (under Media Serbisyo Production Corporation)
- KBYN: Kaagapay ng Bayan
- Magandang Gabi... Bayan
