= Philippine Film Heritage Building =

Government building in Manila

General information
- Status: Under construction
- Location: Intramuros, Manila, Philippines
- Groundbreaking: October 26, 2023
- Estimated completion: 2025

Technical details
- Grounds: 800 m^{2} (8,600 sq ft)

Design and construction
- Main contractor: Great Pacific Builders and General Contractor, Inc.

The Philippine Film Heritage Building (PFHB) is a government building under-construction within Intramuros in Manila, Philippines.

== History ==
=== Conception and groundbreaking ===
The groundbreaking ceremony for the Philippine Film Heritage Building happened on October 26, 2023. It is preceded by a 22-year tripartite agreement between the Film Development Council of the Philippines (FDCP), the Department of Tourism (DOT), and the Tourism Infrastructure and Enterprise Zone Authority (TIEZA) signed on September 26, 2023, for the purpose of constructing a film heritage building. However plans for a heritage building is already existas early as November 2022 with the proponents looking to acquire a property under a lease setup.

The Great Pacific Builders and General Contractor, Inc. of Curlee and Sarah Discaya was involved as the contractor of at least the first phase of the Philippine Film Heritage Building. The first phase was deemed completed in December 2024. The contract was awaraded on September 25, 2023.

As per DPWH records, Great Pacific Builders is also the contractor of the second phase.

In May 2025, First Lady Liza Araneta-Marcos visited the site and expressed excitement on inaugurating the building in the future.

=== Substandard construction scandal ===
The second phase which involved interior imfrastructure was scheduled to be completed by September 4, 2025. However this target was not met. Araneta-Marcos visited the site again on that date calling the building a "rotten monument of incompetence" after seeing leaking ceilings, cracked walls and unfinished theaters.

Palace Press Officer Claire Castro conveyed the government's intent to file charges against Great Pacific Builders. The Discayas distance itself claiming that the second phase was handled by a different company.

== Tenants ==
The building which covers a 800-square-meter (8,600 sq ft) lot is meant to house the offices of the FDCP as well as the Cinematheque Centre Manila and the Philippine Film Archive (PFA). The latter will reportedly host a museum, a media archive and facilities for film restoration and preservation. The PFA is the film archiving unit of the FDCP established in 2011. There are also plans to host a library of film scripts.
