= Trip na Trip =

- Genre: Travel show
- Created by: Bayan Productions
- Developed by: ABS-CBN News and Current Affairs
- Written by: Cesar Paterno; Jigs V. De Castro; Richard D. Cumal; Ryan Christopher V. Napiza
- Presented by: Katherine de Castro; Jayson Gainza; Uma Khouny; Kian Kazemi; Akihiro Sato; Franzen Fajardo; Boogs Bugia; Kevin Lapena
- Theme music composer: Brownman Revival
- Opening theme: Under the Reggae Moon by Brownman Revival
- Ending theme: Under the Reggae Moon by Brownman Revival
- Composer: Brownman Revival
- Country of origin: Philippines
- Original language: Filipino

Production
- Executive producer: Katherine de Castro
- Production location: Philippines
- Camera setup: Multiple-camera setup
- Running time: 30 minutes
- Production company: Bayan Productions

Original release
- Network: ABS-CBN
- Release: February 5, 2006 – July 22, 2011

Trip na Trip is a Philippine television travel documentary show broadcast by ABS-CBN. Originally hosted by Kat de Castro and Franzen Fajardo, it aired from February 5, 2006 to July 22, 2011. De Castro, Fajardo, Kian Kazemi, Uma Khouny, Jayson Gainza, Boogs Bugia, Akihiro Sato, and Kevin Lapena serve as the final hosts. A one-of-a-kind reality-based travel show on Philippine television, the program focused on lesser-known and even unexplored regions of the country and attracted both local and foreign viewers.

== Segments ==
- Hamon ng Bayan
- Usapang Berde
- Food Trip
- Cooking Ko, Cooking Mo, Cooking Nating Lahat

== Awards ==
- 2011 PMPC Star Awards for Television's "Best Travel Show"
- 2011 PMPC Star Awards for Television's "Best Travel Show Host/s" (Kat de Castro, Jason Gainza, Franzen Fajardo, and Kian Kazemi)
