= Harold Clavite =

Filipino civil servant

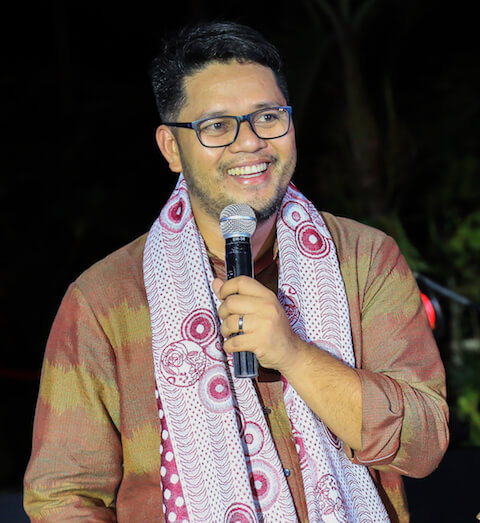
- Born: January 18, 1977 (age 49); Baroy, Lanao del Norte, Philippines
- Education: Bachelor's Degree in Psychology at Mindanao State University
- Occupation: Philippine Information Agency (Director General)
- Years active: 2016-2019

Harold Clavite (born January 18, 1977) was the Director-General of the Philippine Information Agency. He was appointed by President Rodrigo Duterte in July 2016 and remained in office until August 2019.

== Early life ==
Clavite is a native of Mindanao, born and raised in Baroy, Lanao del Norte, Philippines.

He holds a bachelor's degree in psychology acquired from the Mindanao State University and a master's degree in communication from the Polytechnic University of the Philippines. He completed a certificate on Public Policy Delivery from the Lee Kuan Yew School of Public Policy in the National University of Singapore in 2016.

== Career in New York City ==
Prior to working in the Duterte Administration, Clavite worked in the United Nations Development Programme (UNDP) in New York City as digital communications associate. At UNDP, he also worked as Executive Associate in the UN Development Group providing immediate support to the Directorate and supporting communication and information management. In 2013, Clavite worked as a staffer in the Information Management Unit of the Department of Public Information (DPI) in the UN Secretariat, the office handling information dissemination to all UN Information Centres (UNIC) worldwide including UNDP country offices and UN peacekeeping field offices. Clavite began his United Nations career in Manila while working as Senior Public Information and Private Partnerships Assistant in the World Food Programme Philippines country office. In 2013, Clavite was Managing Director and Communication Specialist at HRS Innovates Consulting in New York City. Prior to his UN work in New York, Clavite worked as Senior U.S. Immigration paralegal in Burke, Stone & Arteficio.

== Controversies ==
Clavite became known in Philippine politics after being involved in some controversies affecting his relationships with other officials appointed by Duterte. In 2018, he called on former Assistant Secretary Mocha Uson of the Presidential Communications Operations Office (PCOO) to go on leave and apologize for her actions in a viral video known as "pepe-dede-ralismo," which was aimed to promote Federalism in the Philippines. However, the video was generally not accepted by the public due to its lewdness. Clavite stated in his statement posted on social media that the video was done in poor taste and Uson's actions was an insult to communication professionals.

In 2019, Clavite was involved in another controversy after being investigated for corruption allegations by PCOO. He claimed that PCOO was probing allegations based on anonymous letters accusing PCOO of being biased. Clavite claimed how quickly and easily the PCOO made corruption allegations against him when they did not act on a complaint he sent to PCOO over alleged irregularities in PIA. He claimed that the corruption allegation was a demolition job against him.
