= Daphne Oseña-Paez =

Filipino television host, news reporter and blogger

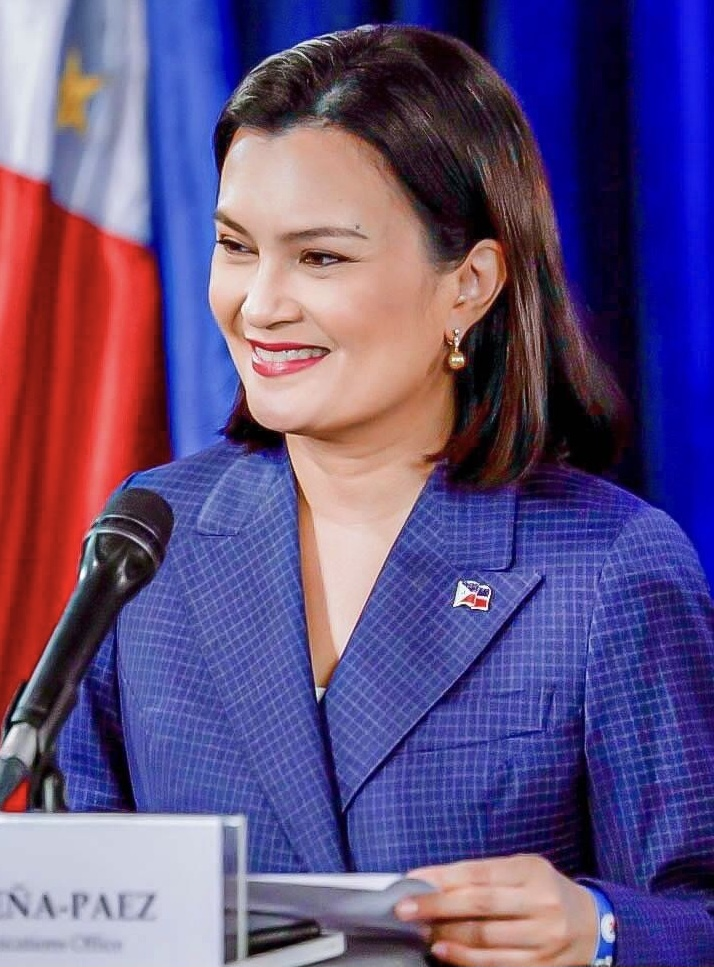

Malacañang Press Briefer
- In office December 20, 2022 – December 31, 2024
- President: Bongbong Marcos
- Preceded by: Position established
- Succeeded by: Usec. Claire Castro (Malacañang Press Officer)

Personal details
- Born: Daphne Oseña; March 15, 1970 (age 56)
- Spouse: Patrick Paez
- Children: 3
- Occupation: Television host; news reporter; blogger; author; entrepreneur; producer; press briefer

Daphne Oseña-Paez (born March 15, 1970) is a Filipino television host, news reporter, author, blogger, and entrepreneur who serves as the Malacañang Press Briefer, operating under the Presidential Communications Office of the Office of the President from 2022 to 2024.

== Education ==
Oseña-Paez obtained her Bachelor of Arts with a specialization in art history and major in urban studies from the University of Toronto.

== Career ==
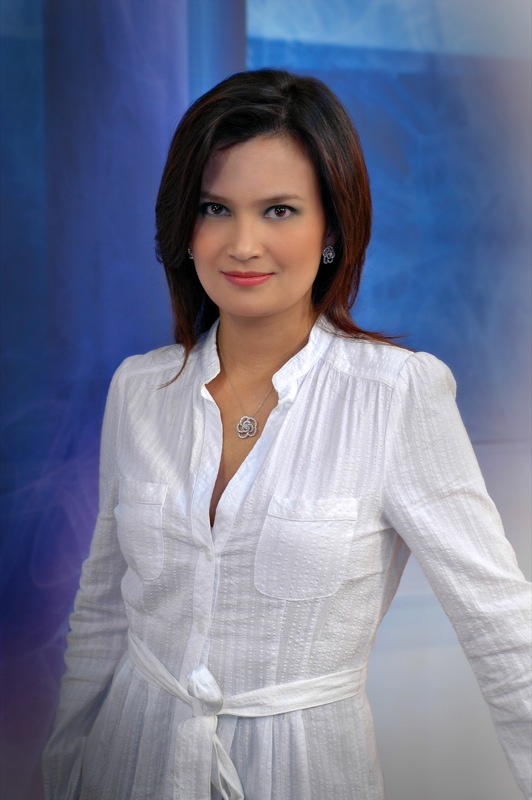
Oseña-Paez in 2007

Osena-Paez initially started as a news reporter of ABS-CBN and Studio 23 and was the weather presenter of the late night English newscast The World Tonight from 1996 to 1999.

From 1999 to 2006, she hosted the lifestyle show F! with Angel Aquino and Cher Calvin—with model Amanda Griffin later taking over Calvin in 2003. In 2000, she also started hosting Bayan Productions's A Guide to Urban Living. When F! ended; she hosted Urban Zone, where she was also creator, producer and writer, the show ran from 2006 to 2012. She also hosted Proudly Filipina from 2006 to 2008.

Osena-Paez appeared in the film You Changed My Life and launched her own line of linens in partnership with Linens Direct in 2009. In 2010, she launched Daphne, originally a furniture line and eventually would include home scents and jewelry. She hosted the lifestyle show Cocktales with Vic Agustin and Cita Revilla in 2013 and started her blog daphne.ph in 2014.

In 2016, her book Chic: Tips on Life, Style, and Work was released. She started appearing in AirAsia's travel web series Red Talks in 2018.

In 2021, Oseña-Paez started hosting Recreate, a lifestyle show presenting local artists and creativity on Cignal TV.

In December 2022, she was appointed as Malacañang Palace press briefer.

== Personal life ==
Oseña-Paez is married to journalist and current OIC of News5 Patrick Paez. Together they have three daughters Sophia, Stella and Lily.

She was appointed UNICEF Goodwill ambassador in 2019.

== Awards and nominations ==
Year	Work	Organization	Category	Result	Source
2002	F!	PMPC Star Awards for Television	Best Lifestyle Show Host	Won	
2003	F!	PMPC Star Awards for Television	Best Lifestyle Show Host	Won	
2004	F!	PMPC Star Awards for Television	Best Lifestyle Show Host	Won	
2008	Urban Zone	PMPC Star Awards for Television	Best Lifestyle Show Host	Nominated	
2009	Urban Zone	PMPC Star Awards for Television	Best Lifestyle Show Host	Nominated	
2010	Urban Zone	PMPC Star Awards for Television	Best Lifestyle Show Host	Nominated	
2011	Urban Zone	PMPC Star Awards for Television	Best Lifestyle Show Host	Nominated	
