= Philippine News Agency =

Official news agency of the Philippine government

News agency overview
- Formed: March 1, 1973; 53 years ago
- Preceding News agency: Philippine News Service (PNS)
- Headquarters: Philippine Information Agency Building, Visayas Avenue, Barangay Vasra, Quezon City, Philippines; 14°39.3′N 121°2.8′E
- News agency executives: Luis A. Morente, News and Information Bureau (NIB) Director; Pamela D. Samia, Executive Editor
- Parent News agency: Presidential Communications Operations Office
- Website: www.pna.gov.ph

Philippine News Agency (PNA) is the official news agency of the Philippine government. PNA is under the supervision and control of the News and Information Bureau, an attached agency of the Presidential Communications Operations Office. It was established on March 1, 1973, by President Ferdinand Marcos, and currently has its headquarters in Quezon City.

== History ==
=== Philippine News Service ===
The Philippine News Service (PNS) was organized in 1950 as a news gathering cooperative by the publishers of the then-leading national newspapers: the Manila Times-Mirror-Taliba, Manila Chronicle, Manila Bulletin, Philippines Herald, Evening News, Bagong Buhay, and The Fookien Times. Its main function was to supply daily news and photos from the provinces to these newspapers, as well as to those in other provinces.

Radio and television stations also used PNS stories for a fixed monthly fee or subscription. Foreign news agencies, such as the Associated Press, United Press International, Reuters, and Agence France-Presse, and a few private entities were also allowed to subscribe.

Through the old mail system, it also maintained a news exchange agreement with foreign news agencies such as Antara of Indonesia, Bernama of Malaysia, Kyodo of Japan, Yonhap of South Korea, Central News Agency of Taiwan, and TASS of the former Soviet Union, among several others.

When President Marcos declared martial law on September 23, 1972, the PNS was forced to cease 24-hour daily operations since its major clients (newspapers, radio, and television stations) were padlocked and guarded by government troops. At the time of its closure, the PNS had some 120 news correspondents across provinces and cities of the country.

=== Establishment ===
About four months after the imposition of martial law, Marcos allowed a handful of newspapers and broadcast outfits to reopen. A group of former newspaper editors asked then the Department of Public Information (DPI) Secretary and later on Senator Francisco S. Tatad to explore the possibility of opening a government news agency by acquiring the World War II-vintage teletype machines and other equipment of the shuttered PNS.

The group's efforts resulted in the government reopening PNS, renamed Philippines News Agency (PNA), and restructured as the government’s official news outfit. Negotiations for the acquisition of PNS equipment were done by a group of former newspapermen from Tatad’s office at Malacañang Palace, including the late Bureau of National and Foreign Information (BNFI) Director Lorenzo J. Cruz and the late Press Undersecretary Amante Bigornia.

José L. Pavia, the late former executive editor of the defunct Philippines Herald, was appointed as the first general manager of PNA. He led its initial eleven-member staff, with the late Renato B. Tiangco as managing editor, and Severino C. Samonte as national and provincial news editor.

It was created by a Special Department Order issued by Tatad under the BNFI, its first parent bureau that also funded it. The agency initially used the vacated PNS editorial offices on the second floor of the National Press Club (NPC) of the Philippines Building along Magallanes Drive in the Intramuros district of Manila. When Tatad turned on the switch to launch the agency in the afternoon of March 1, 1973 in Malacañang, he said: “The Philippines News Agency will be operated in the best tradition of the world’s professional news agencies.”

According to PNA, during the martial law years, the PNA along with international news agencies Reuters, AFP, AP, and UPI covered the entire archipelago and entered into news exchange agreements with some of these news agencies.

=== Expansion ===
The following year, PNA inaugurated its first domestic bureau in Cebu City, the country’s second-largest metropolitan area. In 1974, PNA also opened bureaus in Iloilo City, Baguio, Davao City, San Fernando, Pampanga; Cagayan de Oro, Bacolod, and Dagupan. These were followed by offices in Lucena, Legazpi, Cotabato City, Tacloban, Zamboanga City, Dumaguete, Iligan, Laoag, Tuguegarao, San Fernando, La Union; Jolo; and Los Baños.

The peak number of domestic bureaus was 23 in 1975, with the opening of additional ones in Cabanatuan, General Santos, and Tagbilaran. However, these satellite bureaus were reduced drastically due to the agency's cost-cutting measures in later years.

=== Post-EDSA ===
Until early 1986, the PNA, through the former Office of Media Affairs (OMA) headed by then Information Minister Gregorio S. Cendana, had overseas bureaus in San Francisco, California; Sacramento, Los Angeles, New York, Washington, D.C., Chicago, Toronto (Canada), Sydney (Australia) and Jeddah. These were closed down after the 1986 EDSA Revolution that overthrew the Marcos regime.

During government reorganization in 1987 under President Corazon Aquino, the BNFI was abolished and replaced with two new bureaus: the modern News and Information Bureau (NIB); and the Bureau of Communications Services (BCS).

=== Present ===
The Philippine News Agency remains a division of the News and Information Bureau. The agency is an attached agency of the Presidential Communications and Operations Office (PCOO).

== PNA Newsroom notable people ==
- William Thio
- Marita Moaje
- Rom Dulfo
- Stephanie Sevillano
