= Malacañang Press Corps =

Group of journalists covering the Philippine President

Members of the Malacañang Press Corps cover a 2023 press briefing conducted by the Presidential Communications Office.

The Malacañang Press Corps (MPC) is an organization of Philippine journalists accredited to cover the President of the Philippines, the Office of the President, and presidential activities and events at Malacañang Palace. Its membership consists of professional journalists representing mainstream media and other news platforms, including print, radio and online news media.

Regular press briefings for the MPC are held at the Press Briefing Room of the New Executive Building (NEB) in the Malacañang complex. The briefings are conducted by officials of the Presidential Communications Office and provide members of the press corps with an opportunity to ask questions concerning the activities, policies, and statements of the President and the administration.

== Overview ==
The Palace Press Officer, an official of the Presidential Communications Office with the rank of undersecretary, conducts regular press briefings for journalists covering the Office of the President. The position is responsible for media relations and serves as the principal Palace official conducting regular briefings with members of the Malacañang press corps. During the briefings, journalists covering the President and the executive branch ask questions concerning presidential activities, government policies, official statements, and other matters involving the administration. PCO-published briefing records document questions from reporters representing different news organizations and media platforms.

== History ==
The Malacañang Press Corps, modeled after the White House press corps, has been recognized as an organized group of journalists covering the Philippine presidency since at least the 1960s, during the administration of President Diosdado Macapagal. Carmen “Ching” Suva, who worked in Malacañang for 42 years handling media relations, recalled the existence of the press corps during the Macapagal administration. Its officers have periodically been elected and formally recognized alongside other Palace-based media organizations, including the Malacañang Cameramen Association and the Presidential Photojournalists Association.

During the administration of Corazon Aquino, journalists covering the President operated from a press working area near the Malacañang Guest House. By 1989, Press Secretary Teodoro Benigno had the Palace renovated to provide a press briefing room and workstations for members of the Press Corps.

The MPC continued to operate under succeeding administrations. During the Fidel V. Ramos administration, members of the MPC regularly accompanied the President on official trips within the Philippines to cover his provincial engagements. During the administrations of Ramos and Joseph Estrada, the Kalayaan Hall served extensively as a facility for the Office of the Press Secretary and the Malacañang Press Corps.

== Members ==
=== Officers (2026–2027) ===
- Ivan Mayrina, GMA Network (MPC President)
- Chona Yu, DZRJ (MPC Vice President for Radio)
- Maricel Halili-Gahol, TV5 (MPC Vice President for TV)
- Jocelyn Montemayor-Reyes, Malaya Business Insight (MPC Vice President for Print)
- Julie Baiza, One News PH (MPC Vice President for Online)
- Ivy Reyes, Bilyonaryo (MPC Secretary)
- Leonilet Narciso, DZRH (MPC Treasurer)
- Evelyn Quiroz, Pilipino Mirror (MPC Auditor)
- Alexis Romero, The Philippine Star (MPC Public Relations Officer)
- Jonnel Maribojoc, UNTV and Maricar Sargan, Brigada News FM (MPC Sergeants-at-Arms)

=== Notable outlets ===
- GMA Network
- TV5
- One News PH
- The Philippine Star
- Rappler
- Bilyonaryo
- ABS-CBN
- Manila Bulletin
- Philippine Daily Inquirer
- NewsWatch Plus
- UNTV
- DZRH

== Press Briefer ==
In December 2022, Daphne Oseña-Paez was appointed as the Presidential Communications Office Press Briefer, a position created only for briefings for the Malacañang Press Corps in the New Executive Building. All press conferences that includes President Bongbong Marcos is personally moderated by the PCO Secretary.

In February 24, 2025, the position of a Palace Press Officer was created. The press officer's role, similar to a spokesperson, is to handle media relations for the Executive department. The press officer has a rank of undersecretary within the Presidential Communications Office. The press officer runs regular press briefings with reporters who cover the Office of the President and answer questions from journalists about the president's concerns or opinions. The press officer also explains new government policies, standard updates and daily activities of the president. Claire Castro was appointed for the position.

Portrait	Name	Term Began	Term Ended	President
(Press Briefer)	Daphne Oseña-Paez	2022	2024	Bongbong Marcos
(Press Officer)	Claire Castro	2025	–	Bongbong Marcos

== See also ==
- Press gallery
- Canberra Press Gallery
- Kremlin pool
- White House press corps
