= Florentino Floro =

Former Filipino judge

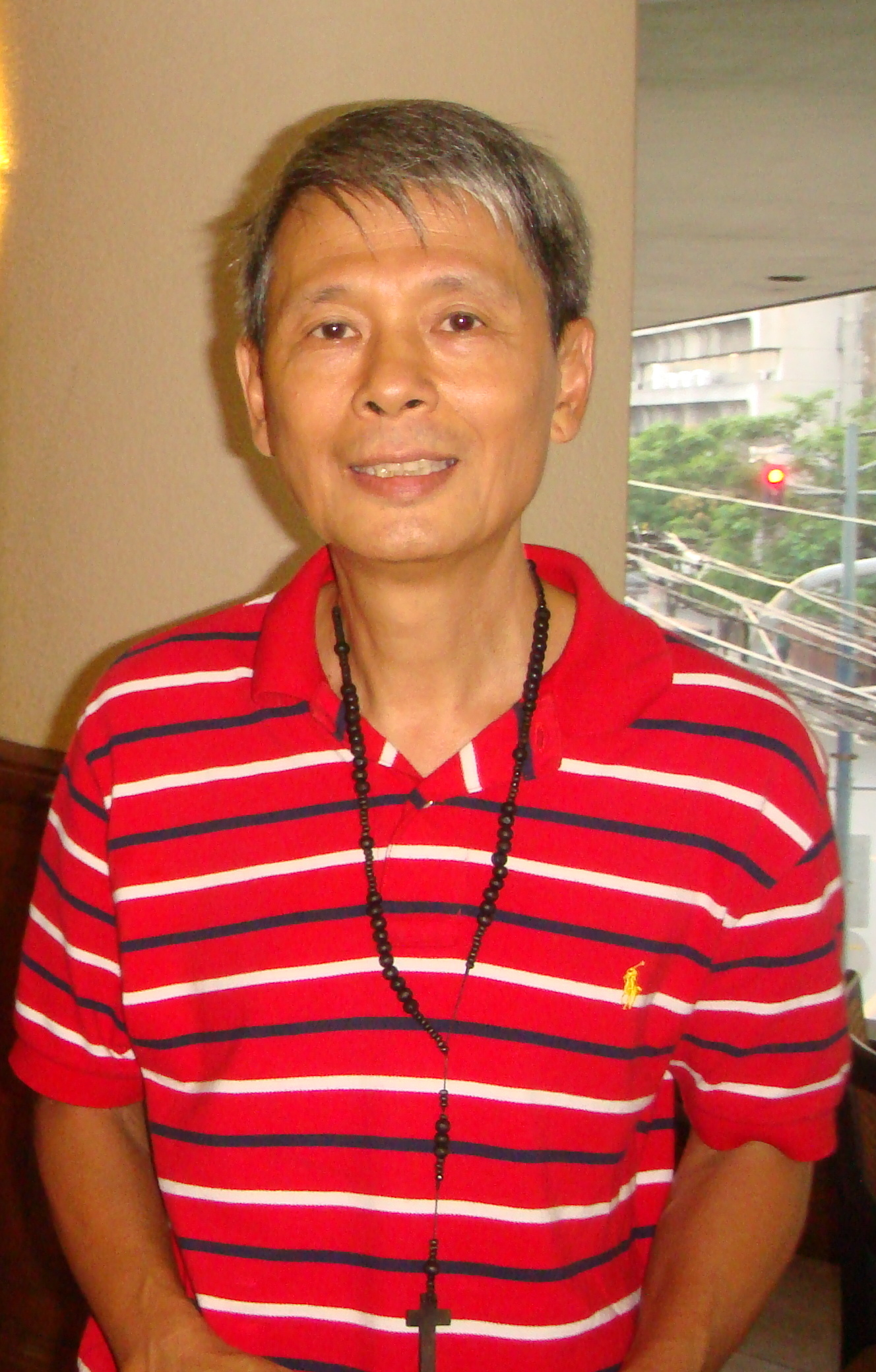
- Floro in August 2012
- Born: November 5, 1953 (age 73); Manila, Philippines
- Known for: Self-proclaimed psychic, former judge dismissed for mental illness

Florentino Velasquez Floro Jr. (born November 5, 1953) is a Filipino former judge who achieved notoriety after being suspended from the Philippine judiciary in 2006 due to mental illness. Floro made several statements that he was psychic and claimed to frequently communicate with invisible duendes, a type of dwarf common in Filipino and Latin American mythology.

== Biography ==
Florentino Velasquez Floro Jr. was born in Manila, Philippines, on November 5, 1953, eldest of five brothers, to Florentino Carreon Floro Sr. and Milagros Geronimo Velasquez. Floro's primary education was by the Religious of the Virgin Mary, graduating from secondary school in 1969 in Valenzuela City. Initially training to be a priest, he entered the seminary in 1965, leaving the priesthood to enter law. From 1970 to 1974 Floro attended Adamson University and Ateneo de Manila University's Loyola Schools, earning a BA in philosophy and theology. Floro earned a Bachelor of Laws degree from the Ateneo Law School and placed 12th in the 1983 Philippine Bar Examinations with a grade of 87.55 percent.

== Judicial career ==
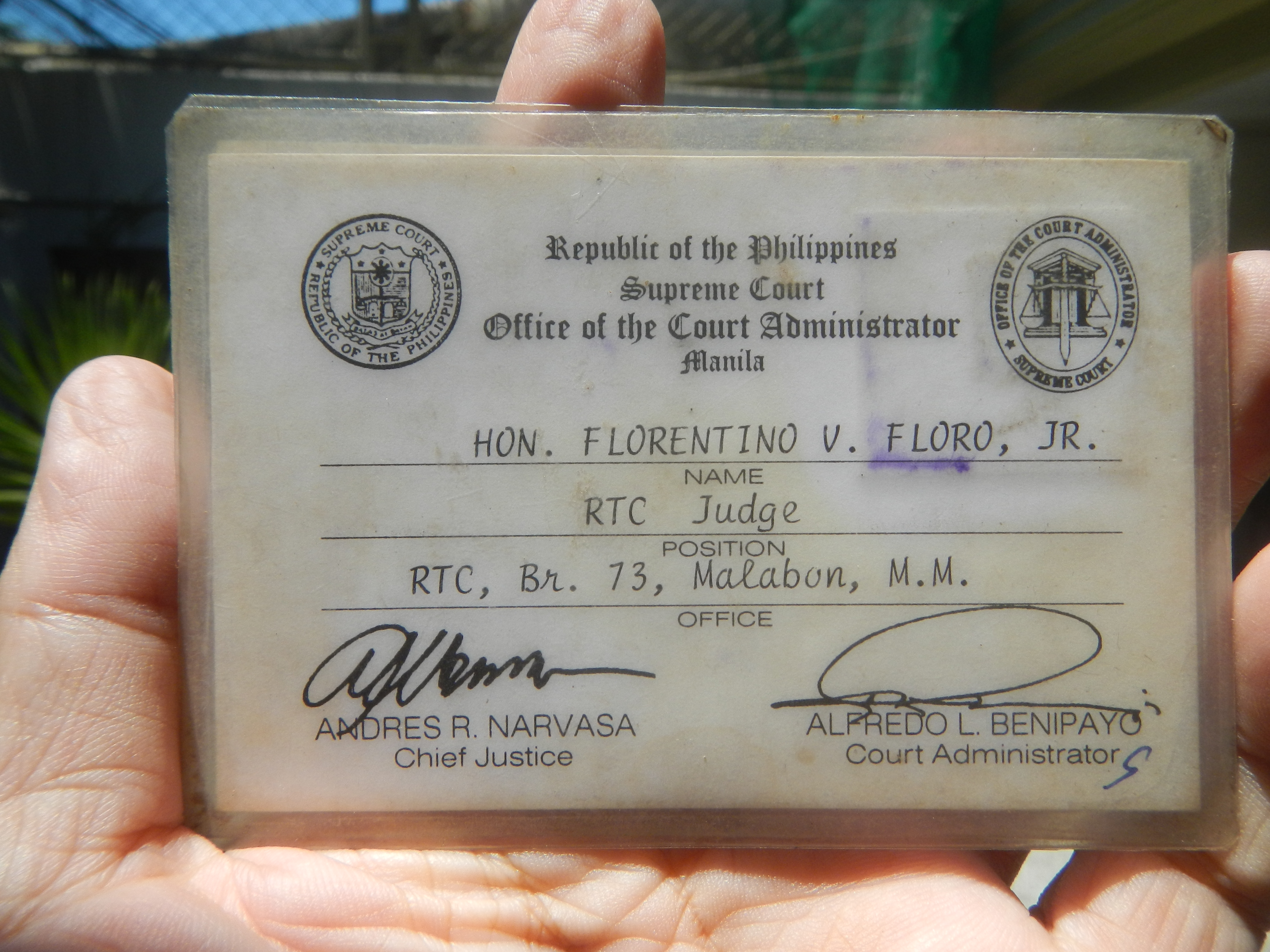
Florentino Floro's judicial ID

In 1995 Floro applied to the Judicial and Bar Council, but was rejected for the bench after failing the mandatory psychological examination by the Supreme Court of the Philippines. The Clinic Services of the Supreme Court found "evidence of ego disintegration" and "developing psychotic process", and Floro voluntarily withdrew his application. Floro re-applied in 1998, again with a negative evaluation. Due to his impressive academic performance he was allowed to submit a second, more favorable psychiatric opinion from private practitioners. On his 45th birthday Floro was appointed a regional trial court judge in the Metro Manila region of the capital (the youngest ever appointed) and began work in November 1998. Floro stated his mission was to rid the Philippine legal system of corruption. In March of the following year, Floro requested an audit be performed, which resulted in a July 13 report to a court administrator who recommended the report be considered a complaint against Floro and that he be given another psychiatric examination. On July 20, 1999, Floro was placed on preventive suspension during the investigation against him, for a variety of reasons including:

- Violating a variety of rules governing judicial conduct, including circulating a business card containing self-congratulatory statements, and announcing his qualifications in court
- declarations in criminal cases on the side of the accused
- having a private law practice while a judge
- having hearings without the presence of a prosecuting attorney
- ordering mental and physical examinations of an accused over the objections of a prosecutor on unjustified grounds

The investigation resulted in 13 charges. In March 2001 the Supreme Court reviewed a report incorporating psychiatric and psychological findings of multiple doctors which judged the evidence to be substantiated, and recommended Floro be declared unfit to be a judge, effective immediately. Over the next several years (in part taking so long because of Floro's delaying tactics) the Supreme Court undertook an investigation, ultimately handing down a unanimous decision that Floro be dismissed from the bench. The court did not rule that Floro was insane, but did suffer from psychosis that impaired his judgement.

=== Claims ===
While serving as a judge, Floro made a number of claims, including:

- Being the fifth-best psychic in the country
- Being the "angel of death" and able to cause pain and sickness to those who appeared before him in court
- Having the ability to appear in multiple locations at the same time
- Being aided in the court by three duendes (dwarfs found in Philippine folklore) named Luis, Armand and Angel
- Having healing powers, which he claimed he used to help people in his chambers during breaks

On Fridays, Floro would change from his traditional blue robes to black, which he claimed helped him recharge his psychic powers. Floro's claims went on to garner worldwide attention.

=== Judgment ===
After 68 months of suspension, on April 7, 2006, the Supreme Court fined Floro 40,000 pesos and removed him from his position with three years back pay, allowances, and benefits. The court did not find Floro guilty of gross misconduct or corruption but did find that his mental health indicated "gross deficiency in competence and independence". Floro was also not barred from application or admittance to government services which do not require the dispensation of justice.

== Appeals ==
In May 2006, Floro filed a motion to set aside judgment against him, which was denied. Floro subsequently filed three further motions, arguing that the evidence presented against him in the form of the psychiatric evaluations were inadmissible, and that he should not be dismissed for his beliefs. The court stressed that its decision had nothing to do with Floro's beliefs in dwendes or the validity of that belief, but permitting him to continue as a judge would be harmful to public trust in the judiciary as a guardian of the law.

Despite a directive to file no further appeals, Floro filed several more pleadings. On November 3, 2006, Floro filed his second appeal and a motion to clean the judiciary, accompanying the motion with a statement that he would use his three dwarfs to inflict sickness on the current judges, praying for his curse to work on every Friday. Floro claimed he was dismissed due to his belief in the paranormal.

On July 12, 2007, the Supreme Court justices ordered Floro to stop requesting a review of his case, stating it had no reason to reverse itself on his dismissal and issued a warning that he could be held liable for contempt of court if he continued.

On February 3, 2010, Floro filed his own nomination for the post of Supreme Court chief justice, which then-incumbent Reynato Puno vacated upon his retirement on May 17. However, the high tribunal excluded him from the list of nominees on February 8, citing his earlier disbarment order. He nominated himself once more during the 2012 selection of a replacement chief justice for Renato Corona, but was left out of the final list of nominees on July 7, 2012, along with three other applicants.

== Lawsuits ==
Since his suspension from the judiciary, Floro has filed multiple lawsuits.

In June 2004, Floro filed an intervention petition, in the certiorari lawsuit filed by the opposition Koalisyon ng Nagkakaisang Pilipino (KNP) Davao City Rep. Ruy Elias Lopez, to stop a joint session of Congress from canvassing the votes for president and vice president. Floro asked the Court to declare a failure of elections and order the COMELEC to conduct special presidential elections. Floro also asked the Supreme Court to declare Noli de Castro as acting President, as Solomonic solution to the political crisis.

In January 2007, the Supreme Court of the Philippines dismissed with finality the August 30, 2006 Disbarment administrative lawsuit filed by Floro against Chief Justice Hilario Davide, Jr., Justice Bernardo P. Pardo, Alfredo Benipayo and 6 others.

In late April 2007, Floro filed a disbarment complaint grounded on charges of gross misconduct, ignorance of the law, manifest undue interest, questionable temporary restraining orders and violations of the ethical standards and code of conduct by the Philippine Court of Appeals Associate Justices, "CA 'Dirty Dozen'". Floro named one justice specifically as part of a "dirty dozen", twelve judges currently under investigation for corruption by the court's Ombudsman.

For non-payment of docket fees, the High Court, on June 5, 2007, dismissed Floro's intervention petition dated May 30, 2007, and his supplement dated June 1, 2007, in the Gregory S. Ong citizenship case, filed by former Senate President Jovito Salonga.

On, August 1, 2008, Floro filed a taxpayer lawsuit against some Court of Appeals Justices and lawyers in the GSIS-Meralco bribery case.
