= Swak na Swak =

- Title card from 2017 to 2021
- Also known as: Kabuhayang Swak na Swak
- Genre: Entrepreneurship; Informative
- Presented by: Amy Perez; Bobby Yan; Dimples Romana
- Opening theme: "Lintik" by Brownman Revival (2006–17) "Swak na Swak" by MM and MJ Magno (2017–21)
- Country of origin: Philippines
- Original language: Filipino

Production
- Executive producer: Arlene de Castro
- Producer: Katherine de Castro
- Running time: 30 minutes
- Production companies: Bayan Productions; ABS-CBN News and Current Affairs

Original release
- Network: ABS-CBN (2006–20); ANC (2020–21); Kapamilya Channel (2020–21)
- Release: August 21, 2006 – September 26, 2021

Swak na Swak (lit. 'that fits'), formerly known as Kabuhayang Swak na Swak (perfectly fit business), is a Philippine television informative show broadcast by ABS-CBN and Kapamilya Channel. Originally hosted by Amy Perez and Chase Tinio. It aired on ABS-CBN from August 21, 2006 to May 3, 2020, replacing Kumikitang Kabuyahan. The show moved to ANC from June 7, 2020 to April 25, 2021 and Kapamilya Channel from October 3, 2020 to September 26, 2021. The program features ways, means and techniques of how to start, set up and maintain a certain business. Bobby Yan, Dimples Romana, Ahmir Sinsuat, Shahniza Sinsuat-Hermoso and Ethan Salvador served as the final hosts.

== Hosts ==
Final hosts

- Bobby Yan (2011–2021)
- Ahmir Sinsuat (2017–2021)
- Shah Sinsuat-Hermoso (2017–2021)
- Ethan Salvador (2017–2021)

Former hosts

- Dimples Romana (2011–2020)
- Aly Sevilla (2017)
- Carlos Agassi (2013–14)
- Amy Perez (2006–2010)
- Chase Tinio (2006–07)
- Christine Bersola-Babao (2010–11)
- Donita Rose (2006–2010)
- Eileen Shi (2018)
- Franzen Fajardo (2006–2011)
- Gilbert Remulla (2007–2011)
- Katherine de Castro (2006–2011)
- Jayson Gainza (2006–2011)
- Louie Ngo (2017)
- Roxanne Barcelo (2010–2016)
- Shawn Kyle (2017)
- Markus Paterson (2017)
- Maxine Medina (2019)
- Uma Khouny (2006–07)
- Cherie Mercado (2008)
- Karylle (2010)

== See also ==
- List of programs broadcast by ABS-CBN
