= Kat de Castro =

Filipino journalist

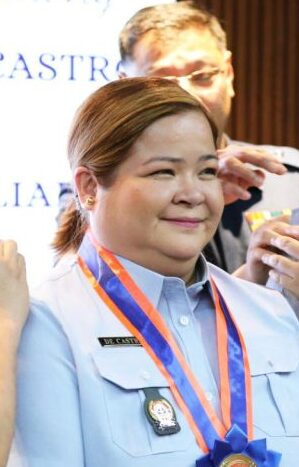
- De Castro in 2026

Director-General of the Philippine Information Agency
- Incumbent
- Assumed office October 3, 2024
- President: Bongbong Marcos
- Preceded by: Joe Torres

General Manager of the People's Television Network
- In office May 18, 2020 – June 30, 2022
- President: Rodrigo Duterte
- Preceded by: Richard S. Valdez
- Succeeded by: Julio O. Castillo, Jr.

President & CEO of the Intercontinental Broadcasting Corporation
- In office March 26, 2019 – May 18, 2020
- President: Rodrigo Duterte

Personal details
- Born: Katherine Chloe Sinsuat de Castro; October 18, 1978 (age 48) Quezon City, Philippines
- Spouse: Eric Cruz (m. 2004)
- Children: 1
- Parent(s): Noli de Castro; Arlene Sinsuat
- Education: Miriam College
- Occupation: Journalist; TV personality

Katherine Chloe "Kat" Sinsuat de Castro-Cruz (Tagalog: [ˌkaːt dɛ ˈkaːs.tɾo]; born October 18, 1978) is a Filipino journalist and television personality, currently serving as the Director-General of the Philippine Information Agency since 2024, under President Bongbong Marcos.

Before her appointment in the PIA, de Castro held several public media roles in the government. She served as Undersecretary of Tourism Advocacy and Public Affairs at the Department of Tourism under Secretary Wanda Corazon Teo starting August 15, 2016, before resigning in 2018. A year later, she was reappointed as President and CEO of the Intercontinental Broadcasting Corporation in 2019, and later became General Manager and Board Director of the People's Television Network from 2020 to 2022.

== Biography ==
Katherine Chloe Sinsuat de Castro is one of the three children of ABS-CBN News anchor and former Vice President Noli de Castro. She is the elder of two children with his second wife, former ABS-CBN News and Current Affairs executive and Bayan Productions head Arlene Sinsuat de Castro. She was among the personalities who actively support the former Davao City Mayor and Philippine President Rodrigo Duterte's campaign during the 2016 Philippine presidential election. In fact, she is a co-organizer of the DU31: One Love, One Nation Thanksgiving Party held last June 4, 2016, at the Davao Crocodile Park in Davao City.

She was the former host of the travel show Trip na Trip and business magazine show Swak na Swak, both produced by Bayan Productions, their own production house, and aired on ABS-CBN. She was also a host for her father's own public affairs program Magandang Gabi, Bayan and a reporter for ABS-CBN News.

De Castro finished Communication Arts degree at Miriam College.

== Controversies ==
De Castro was involved in several controversies in relation to her short stint as Tourism undersecretary. She received overwhelming backlash from netizens who believed there was conflict of interest for allowing her boyfriend, musician Pancho Juanitez, to perform in DOT-sponsored events. Juanitez was also spotted chauffeuring de Castro in official gatherings of the agency.

In May 2018, Commission on Audit (COA) found that there is a memorandum of agreement on file between the DOT and the government-owned People's Television Network (PTV) requiring the latter to air a 6-minute tourism advertisement section in PTV's Kilos Pronto, a public service program. This has been criticized, since at the time of the agreement the Department of Tourism Secretary was Wanda Tulfo Teo, the sister of the producers and hosts of the show (Erwin and Ben Tulfo). De Castro was summoned at the Senate for questioning being the chair of DOT's Bids and Awards Committee, which oversees the bidding process of the contractors for the projects and activities of the department.

De Castro approved an invitation to bid for the procurement of jackets to be given to birthday celebrants in the DOT worth ₱1,294,500. The said practice of providing jackets was halted by the succeeding DOT Secretary, Bernadette Romulo-Puyat. In August 2018, Romulo-Puyat requested de Castro to vacate her position in relation to the irregularities that occurred in her office. She was then appointed to become a member of the board of directors of Intercontinental Broadcasting Corporation (IBC) on August 22.

Preceded by Richard S. Valdez	PTNI Network General Manager; May 18, 2020 – June 30, 2022	Succeeded by Julio O. Castillo, Jr.
