= Amanda Griffin =

English model and television personality

- Born: Amanda Claire Ricardo Griffin; 28 September 1979 (age 47); Windsor, Berkshire, England
- Occupations: Model; television personality

Amanda Claire Ricardo Griffin (born 28 September 1979) is a Filipino-British model and television personality in the Philippines. Griffin is the eldest of three children born in Windsor to an English father and a Filipino mother. She spent her childhood growing up in the United Kingdom, the United States, Australia and the Philippines, where she is currently based. She attended a university in Australia and has degrees in both Communications and Business.

Since she was 14, Griffin has modelled for numerous designers and brands both in the Philippines and other countries in Asia, where she has also graced the covers of different magazines. Aside from modelling, Griffin is also an entrepreneur, being the proprietor of Tabu swimwear and event management Fatally Femme Productions. Together with top Filipino model Angel Aquino and TV journalist Daphne Oseña-Paez, Griffin was also a host on the ABS-CBN (eventually moved to Studio 23) lifestyle/fashion weekly show, F!. She also co-hosted the info-travel show Team Explorer on ABS-CBN's sister station, Studio 23.

In 2008, Griffin married David Jacob, the brother of TV host and former swimmer Christine Jacob.

Griffin was crowned as Philippines' Sexiest Vegetarian of 2013 by PETA Asia Pacific.

In 2013, Griffin joined the PETA campaign to free Mali from captivity in Manila Zoo and have her transferred to Boon Lott's Elephant Sanctuary in Thailand. She posed for a photoshoot with Sanya Smith, Geneva Cruz, Ornussa Cadness, Mia Ayesa, Julia Sniegowski, Daiana Menezes and The Amazing Race Philippines contestant Sheena Vera Cruz, who were all asking for Mali to be freed.

== Trivia ==
- She was once a VJ/presenter on the Asian music TV channel, Channel V.
- She was one of the first VJs of Studio 23 in the Philippines.
- She appeared on the cover of FHM Philippines' November 2006 issue.
