= KBYN: Kaagapay ng Bayan =

Philippine television documentary news magazine show

- Title card
- Also known as: KBYN
- Genre: News magazine Documentary
- Presented by: Noli de Castro
- Country of origin: Philippines
- Original language: Tagalog
- No. of episodes: 39

Production
- Camera setup: Multiple-camera setup
- Running time: 1 hour
- Production company: ABS-CBN News and Current Affairs

Original release
- Network: Kapamilya Channel (Note: The program also simulcasted on A2Z and TeleRadyo.)
- Release: April 10, 2022 – June 11, 2023

KBYN: Kaagapay ng Bayan (transl. KBYN: The Nation's Companion; also known as KBYN) is a Philippine television documentary and news magazine show broadcast by Kapamilya Channel. Hosted by Noli de Castro, it aired on the network's Yes Weekend line up from April 10, 2022 to June 11, 2023, replacing Sunday Kapamilya Blockbusters on Kapamilya Channel and Zine Love on A2Z and was replaced by Tao Po!.

== History ==
KBYN: Kaagapay ng Bayan premiered on April 10, 2022, and served as de Castro's comeback on television after he withdrew his bid for the 2022 Senate elections and returned to his home network ABS-CBN, and to the news magazine format since he left Magandang Gabi... Bayan in 2004.

The show aired its final episode on January 1, 2023, as de Castro returned to TV Patrol for the third time 8 days later. Re-runs of past episodes aired from January 8 to June 11 of the same year. New stories from KBYN are highlighted regularly on TV Patrol in a segment called KBYN Special, similar to Kabayan Special Patrol, a segment previously hosted by de Castro and Tao Po! which was previously hosted by de Castro's fellow TV Patrol co-anchor Bernadette Sembrano.

== Host ==
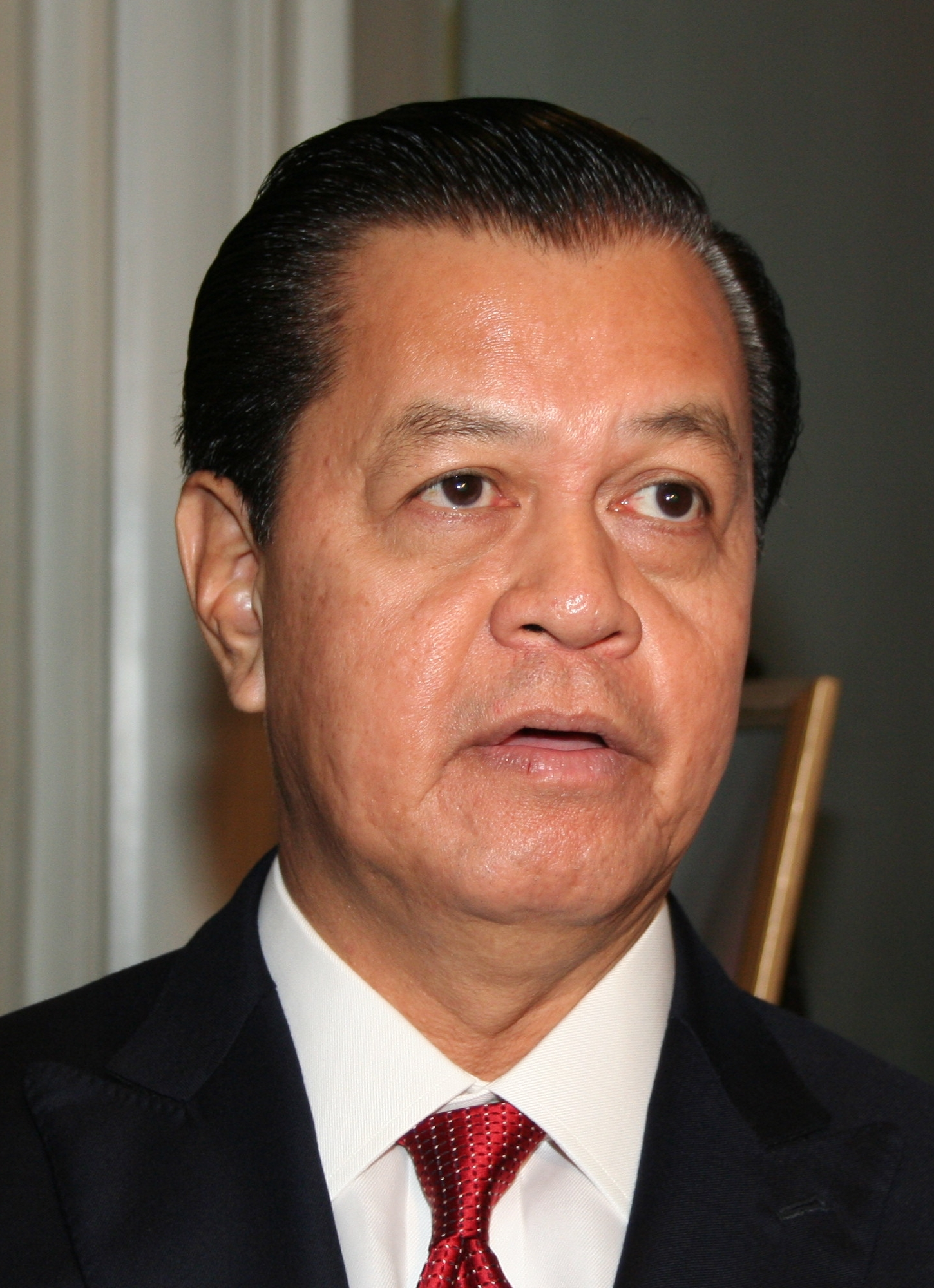
Noli de Castro served as a host.

- Noli de Castro (2022–2023)

== Awards and nominations ==
- New York Festivals TV & Film Awards - Bronze Award for Best Public Affairs Program

== See also ==
- Kabayan
- Magandang Gabi... Bayan
