= Claire Castro =

Filipino lawyer, host, podcaster and public servant (born 1969)

Undersecretary Claire Castro LL.M.
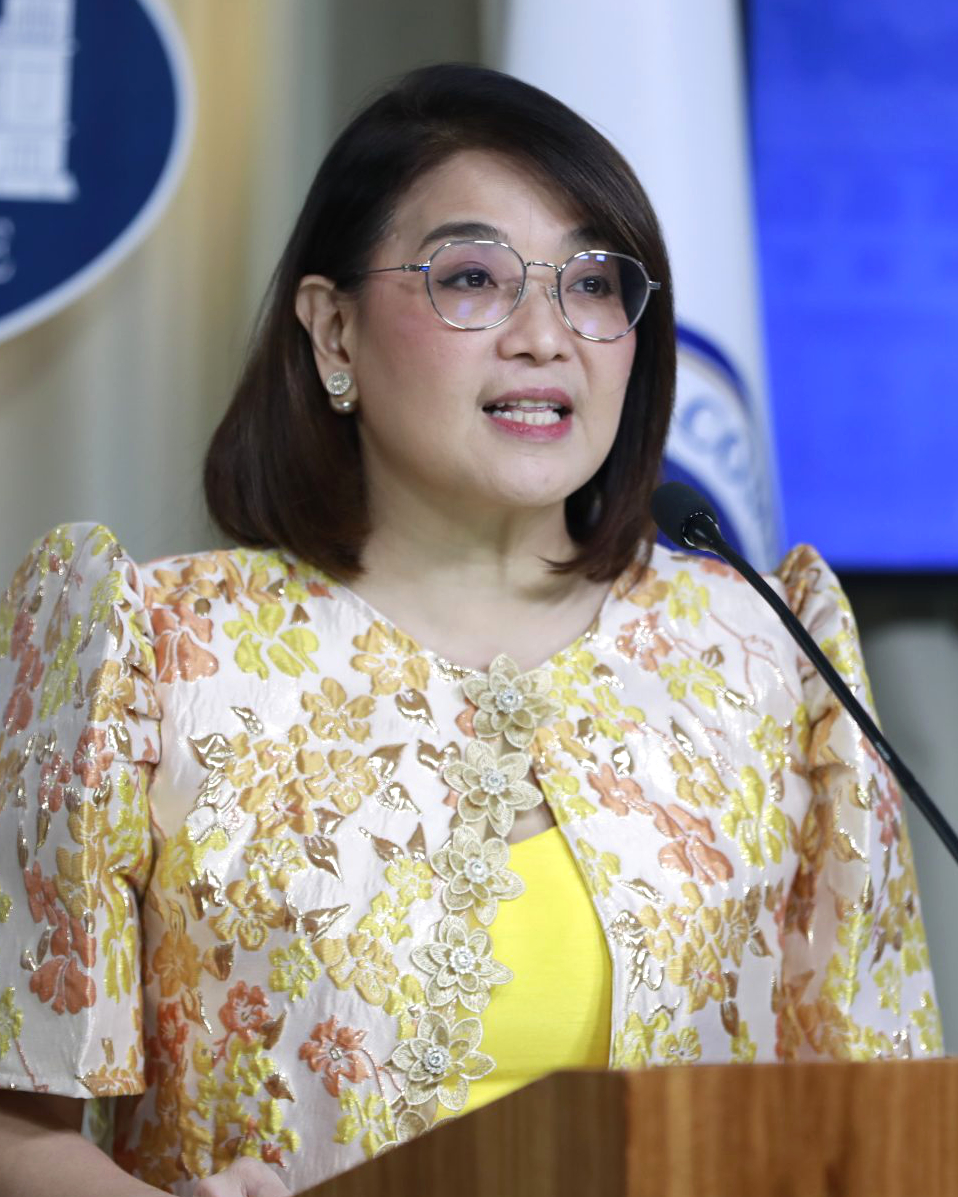
- Castro in 2026

Undersecretary of the Presidential Communications Office

Malacañang Press Officer
- Incumbent
- Assumed office February 24, 2025
- President: Bongbong Marcos
- Preceded by: Daphne Oseña-Paez (press briefer)

Personal details
- Born: Clarissa Angeles Castro; June 27, 1969 (age 57) Philippines
- Spouse: Charlton Seechung
- Children: 2
- Education: University of Santo Tomas (AB, LL.B., LL.M.)
- Occupation: TV host; radio broadcaster; podcaster
- Profession: Lawyer

Clarissa "Claire" Angeles Castro-Seechung (born June 27, 1969) is a Filipino lawyer, radio host, and podcaster who has concurrently served as the undersecretary of the Presidential Communications Office (PCO) and press officer of Malacañang Palace since 2025 under President Bongbong Marcos.

== Education ==
Castro earned her Bachelor of Arts degree in political science from the University of Santo Tomas, and later a Bachelor of Laws degree, graduating cum laude. She also holds a master's degree in law. As a lawyer, Castro has her own private law office and was also the head of the Caloocan, Malabon, and Navotas chapter of the Integrated Bar of the Philippines.

== Career ==
=== Radio host and podcaster ===
Castro was previously the host of the legal-advice radio show Usapang de Campanilla on DZMM, as well as one of the three co-hosts of the ABS-CBN live talk show 3-in1. She also previously wrote a column for Abante. Castro co-hosts the "Usapang Batas" segment on DZXL News and runs the YouTube podcast Batas with Atty. Claire Castro.

=== PCO undersecretary and Malacañang press officer ===
On February 24, 2025, Castro was appointed as the undersecretary of the Presidential Communications Office (PCO) and press officer of Malacañang Palace, immediately assuming the position. She took her oath of office before President Bongbong Marcos, along with the newly appointed PCO secretary, Jay Ruiz.

== Controversies ==
On September 22, 2015, Castro was at the center of an incident involving her intervention on behalf of a client whom she claimed had been arrested without a valid warrant. The situation drew significant public attention as she was briefly detained at the Manila Police District together with her husband, secretary, and client. When the three went to the Manila police department's Women's and Children's Desk to protest the warrantless apprehension of her client, seeking his immediate release, Castro was described by some reports as having turned "hysterical" after speaking with police officers. Castro and her three companions were detained by the police, filing multiple charges of slander by deed, direct assault, and obstruction of justice against them. The three, along with Castro's client, were released the next day. Castro said she would file complaints against the policemen involved.

In December 2017, Castro was vindicated after the Ombudsman dismissed the nine police officers whom she filed complaints against, after they were found guilty of grave misconduct, grave abuse of authority, gross neglect of duty, maltreatment of detainees, unlawful arrest, unjust vexation, slander by deed, sleeping on duty, arbitrary detention, kidnapping, serious illegal detention and robbery extortion.

On January 16, 2026, Batangas's 1st district representative Leandro Leviste filed a libel complaint against Castro over her remarks on the solar energy company founded by the lawmaker. While Castro, on March 23, 2026, demand ₱500 million in damages from Leviste as a counterclaim to his cyber libel suit, alleging that his complaint damaged her integrity.
