= Tao Po! =

Philippine television news magazine show

- Title card
- Genre: News magazine
- Created by: ABS-CBN News and Current Affairs
- Presented by: Bernadette Sembrano
- Opening theme: "Tao Po" by BINI, SB19 and Gloc 9
- Ending theme: "Tao Po" by BGYO, KZ Tandingan and Shanti Dope
- Composers: Jungee Marcelo, Thyro Alfaro & Yumi Lacsamana
- Country of origin: Philippines
- Original language: Filipino
- No. of episodes: 159

Production
- Production company: ABS-CBN News and Current Affairs

Original release
- Network: Kapamilya Channel (Note: The show also airs on A2Z, All TV (since 2026), ANC and TFC. It is also available for online streaming via Kapamilya Online Live and iWant.)
- Release: June 18, 2023 – July 18, 2026

Related
- Pipol; Paano Kita Mapasasalamatan?

Tao Po! (transl. person please!) is a Philippine television news magazine show broadcast by Kapamilya Channel. Hosted by Bernadette Sembrano, it premiered on the network's Yes Weekend! line up from June 18, 2023 to July 18, 2026, replacing KBYN: Kaagapay ng Bayan and was replaced by Ibang Level 'To!.

== Premise ==
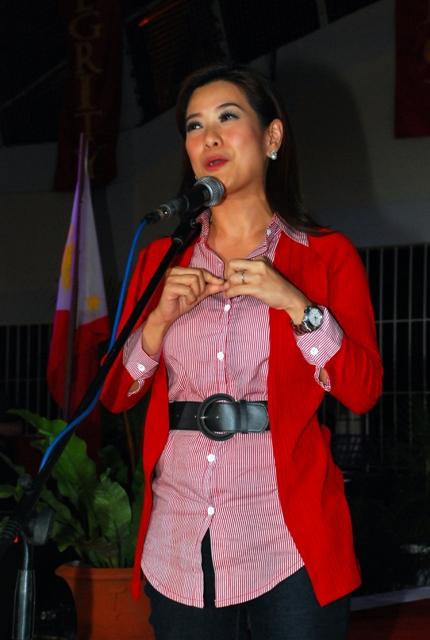
Bernadette Sembrano serves as a host.

The program features stories from TV Patrol anchor Noli de Castro and Patrol ng Pilipino correspondents (Note: A title referring to ABS-CBN News correspondents, named after the former closing line for reporters presenting news stories on the network's evening newscast TV Patrol.) with a wide range of topics from hot issues, inspiring human interest pieces, popular trends, profiles, and entertainment.

== Production notes ==
From November 5, 2023 to February 11, 2024, the program's airing on A2Z temporarily moved to 2:15 p.m. slot, replacing FPJ: Da King movie block and Ipaglaban Mo! (until June 30) to give way for the 2023–24 PBA season. However, the program continued to air on its original timeslot on Kapamilya Channel. In contrast, the movie block continued to air on Kapamilya Channel on cable and satellite and TV5 on free-to-air television until December 31 and was replaced by Sunday Blockbusters. On June 28, 2025, the program's airing moved to the 9:30 p.m. timeslot (later moved to the 9:15 p.m. timeslot on October 4, 2025) on Saturday evenings, replacing the Saturday edition of the Mega Blockbusters movie block. On April 25, 2026, the program's airing moved to the 6:45 p.m. timeslot replacing the second season of Rainbow Rumble. Tao Po! ended after 3 years of broadcasting to give way for the new current affairs program, Ibang Level 'To!.
