= 2010 Marilao local elections =

2010 Marilao mayoral elections
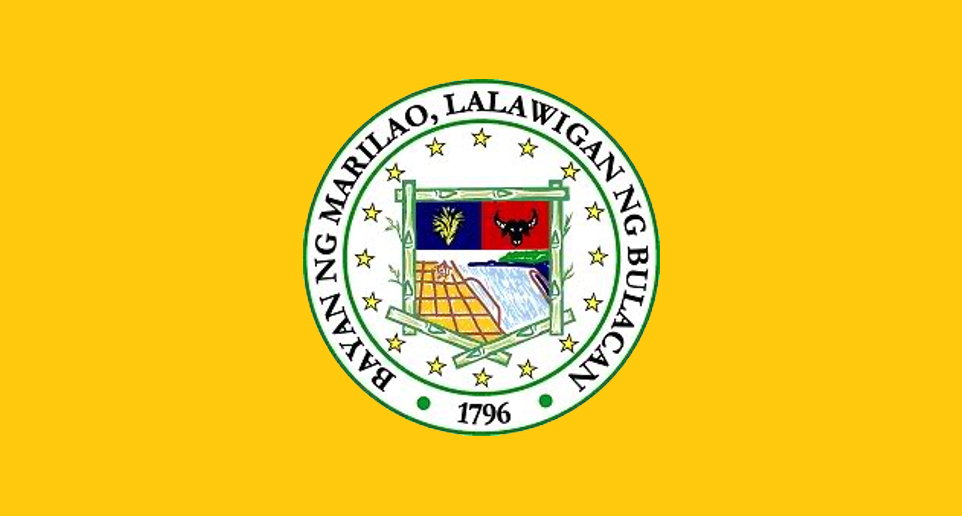
- May 10, 2010
Nominee	Epifanio Guillermo	Neil Ocampo	Johnny Zamora
Party	Liberal	Nacionalista	PMP
Running mate	Juanito Santiago
Popular vote	34,588	18,065	1,620
Percentage	63.73%	33.29%	2.98%
Mayor before election
Epifanio Guillermo
Liberal
Elected mayor
Epifanio Guillermo
Liberal

Local elections were held in Marilao, Bulacan, on May 10, 2010, within the Philippine general election. The voters (Marileños) will elect for the elective local posts in the municipality: the mayor, vice mayor, and eight councilors.

== Mayoral and vice mayoral election ==
Incumbent Mayor Epifanio Guillermo and Vice Mayor Tito Santiago will run for their third term as Mayor and Vice Mayor of Marilao, Bulacan under the Liberal Party.

DZMM radio anchor Neil Ocampo will run for mayor against Guillermo under the banner of the Nacionalista Party.

Former Boardmember Johnny Zamora will run for mayor against Guillermo under the banner of the Pwersa ng Masang Pilipino

== Results ==
The candidates for mayor and vice mayor with the highest number of votes wins the seat; they are voted separately, therefore, they may be of different parties when elected.

=== Mayoral and vice mayoral elections ===
Marilao mayoral election
Party	Candidate	Votes	%
Liberal	Epifanio "Peping" Guillermo	34,588	63.73
Nacionalista	Neil Ocampo	18,065	33.29
PMP	Johnny Zamora	1,620	2.98
Total votes		57,403	100.00
Liberal hold			

Marilao Vice Mayoral Election
Party	Candidate	Votes	%
Liberal	Juanito Santiago	27,251	51.47
Lakas–Kampi	Divina Espiritu-Reyes	25,691	48.53
Total votes		52,942	100.00
Liberal hold			

=== Municipal Council election ===
Voting is via plurality-at-large voting: Voters vote for eight candidates and the eight candidates with the highest number of votes are elected.

Party	Votes	%	Seats
Liberal Party	246,363	70.64	7
Lakas Kampi CMD	85,366	24.48	1
Nacionalista Party	17,052	4.89	0
Ex officio seats			2
Total	348,781	100.00	10
Total votes	57,403	–	

Marilao Municipal Council election
Party	Candidate	Votes	%
Lakas–Kampi	Andre Santos	36,680	10.52
Liberal	Jun Bob Dela Cruz	34,846	9.99
Liberal	Allane Sayo	34,658	9.94
Liberal	Alex Castro	34,581	9.91
Liberal	Alan Aguilar	33,365	9.57
Liberal	Marlon Villamar	28,508	8.17
Liberal	Wilfredo Diaz	27,195	7.80
Liberal	Ariel Amador	26,611	7.63
Liberal	Irma Celones	26,599	7.63
Nacionalista	Gerry Atienza Jr.	17,052	4.89
Lakas–Kampi	Pablo Catorce	13,167	3.78
Lakas–Kampi	Eric Lagman	11,426	3.28
Lakas–Kampi	Danilo Pellobello	7,298	2.09
Lakas–Kampi	Ruperto Montaos Jr.	6,815	1.95
Lakas–Kampi	Gonzales Songco	5,463	1.57
Lakas–Kampi	Valeriano Estorosas Sr.	4,517	1.30
Total votes		57,403	100.00
