= Magandang Gabi... Bayan =

Philippine television news magazine show

- Title card from 2000–2001
- Genre: News magazine
- Presented by: Noli de Castro (1988–2004); Kat de Castro (2001–2005); Erwin Tulfo (2001–2005); Henry Omaga-Diaz (2001–2005); Julius Babao (2001–2005)
- Opening theme: "Decision Makers" by John Cameron
- Ending theme: "Decision Makers" by John Cameron
- Country of origin: Philippines
- Original language: Tagalog
- No. of episodes: 890

Production
- Running time: 60 minutes (1988–1991, 2004–2005); 90 minutes (1991–2004)
- Production company: ABS-CBN News and Current Affairs

Original release
- Network: ABS-CBN
- Release: August 20, 1988 – December 31, 2005

Magandang Gabi... Bayan (transl. good evening...nation) is a Philippine television news magazine show broadcast by ABS-CBN. Hosted by Noli de Castro, it aired from August 20, 1988 to December 31, 2005.

== History ==
The program, styled in the lines of U.S. news magazine programs 60 Minutes and Dateline NBC, was first broadcast on August 20, 1988, with its first anchor Kabayan (transl. "Compatriot") Noli de Castro along with a live studio audience. The program's original aim was to expose illegalities of some Philippine government officials as well as to render public service to the Filipinos. On August 26, 1989, MGB was moved to its long-enduring timeslot of 5:30 PM every Saturday and was reformatted as a news-magazine program without the studio audience and de Castro sitting stage right with a TV monitor on his left, similar to how CBS News reporters introduced their pieces in 60 Minutes.

The program mainly focuses on the current issues and trends in the country in the style of investigation-type reports. Among those main issues is the case of murder. Because of how graphic the MGB team used for their report, de Castro would always warn the viewers that the footage and still images used is sensitive, and in the presence of children, parents or relatives are also reminded to guide the young (Parental Guidance) because of the gruesome clips edited in a time when blurry overlays or pixelated overlays over a dead body are rare.

Outside of its in-depths on the most pressing stories of the week, MGB also became recognized for its themed special episodes such as every November during the Undás (All Saints' Day or Season of the Dead), wherein special episodes featuring horror stories, with a number of them having ties to atrocities in history, were broadcast. These included reenactments of alleged paranormal incidents around the country, with famous allegedly haunted spots such as the Manila Film Center, Laperal Guesthouse, Diplomat Hotel, Clark Hospital, Baker Hall, and even the Malacanang Palace, among many others, acting as studio settings.

Every first week of January, MGB also featured reports about the highlights of the New Year activities including victims of the illegal firecrackers around the country and the New Year celebrations throughout the world as well as recaps of the entry films to the annual Metro Manila Film Festival.

After de Castro's election as Senator of the Philippines in 2001 and his subsequent successful campaign to the Vice-Presidency in 2004, the show appointed longtime substitute presenters Kat de Castro (Noli's daughter), Erwin Tulfo, Henry Omaga-Diaz and Julius Babao as permanent hosts. However by 2004, MGB lost its prime Saturday early evening timeslot and was moved to 7:00 pm in February 14, 7:30 pm in March 6 and 8:00 pm in the later months of the same year. In March 5, 2005, it was moved to 9:00 pm. This arrangement lasted until the final episode broadcast on December 31, 2005.

== Main hosts ==
- Noli de Castro (1988–2004)
- Kat de Castro (2001–05)
- Erwin Tulfo (2001–05)
- Henry Omaga-Diaz (2001–05)
- Julius Babao (2001–05)

== See also ==
- List of Philippine television shows
- List of programs broadcast by ABS-CBN
- Brigada Siete
- KBYN: Kaagapay ng Bayan
