= Presidential Communications Office =

Office within the Office of the President of the Philippines

- Tanggapang Pampanguluhan sa Komunikasyon
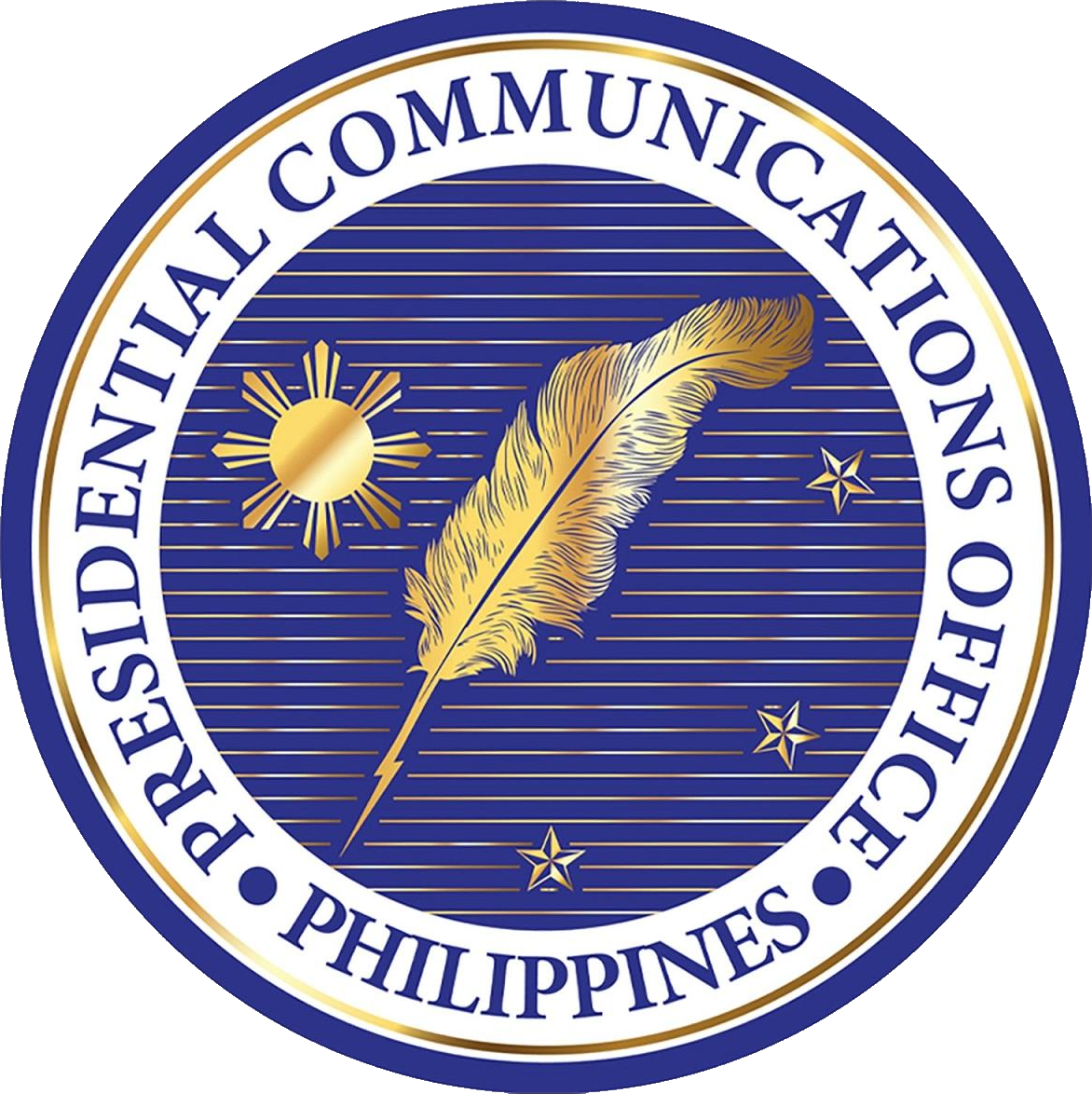
- Seal

Agency overview
- Formed: August 9, 2010; 16 years ago
- Headquarters: 2nd Flr. New Executive Bldg., Malacañang Compound, Manila
- Employees: 184 (2024)
- Annual budget: ₱1.69 billion (2020)
- Agency executives: Lino Cayetano, Ad Interim Secretary; Claire Castro, Undersecretary, Palace Press Officer
- Website: pco.gov.ph

The Presidential Communications Office (PCO; Filipino: Tanggapang Pampanguluhan sa Komunikasyon), formerly known as the Presidential Communications Group (PCG), is the lead communications arm of the Office of the President of the Philippines that is tasked with communicating the administration's messages and the executive branch of government. The office is headed by the Presidential Communications Secretary.

The PCO, together with the Presidential Communications Development and Strategic Planning Office, was previously under the Presidential Communications Group.

The PCO is responsible for conveying the president's messages and the administration's policies to the public. Its vision is to be the leading source of government information, aiming to create an informed and empowered citizenry. To achieve this, the PCO works closely with key stakeholders, ensuring the effective dissemination of information through various media platforms. It plays a vital role in developing and managing the president's strategic communications, ensuring a unified message from the government.

== Presidential spokesperson ==

The Presidential Spokesperson spoke on behalf of the President about matters of public interest. Considering the restricted level of access that the media has to the Chief Executive, the spokesperson was expected to be the primary source of presidential directives in the absence of the President of the Philippines.

The presidential spokesperson was not subject to confirmation by the Commission on Appointments, and did not have any specific item or template in government.

The position was last occupied by the secretary of the Presidential Communications Operations Office, Martin Andanar, in an acting capacity due to the resignation of Harry Roque, while the Assistant to the presidential spokesperson was Kris Roman of the Duterte administration. During the administration of President Bongbong Marcos, the office was abolished and all its personnel, equipment and functions were transferred to the office of the press secretary then headed by Trixie Cruz-Angeles.

In December 2022, Daphne Oseña-Paez was appointed as the Presidential Communications Office Press Briefer, a position created only for briefings for the Malacañang Press Corps in the New Executive Building. All press conferences that includes President Bongbong Marcos is personally moderated by the PCO Secretary.

In February 24, 2025, the position of a Palace Press Officer was created. The press officer's role, similar to a spokesperson, is to handle media relations for the Executive department. The press officer has a rank of undersecretary within the Presidential Communications Office. The press officer runs regular press briefings with reporters who cover the Office of the President and answer questions from journalists about the president's concerns or opinions. The press officer also explains new government policies, standard updates and daily activities of the president. Claire Castro was appointed for the position.

== Overview ==
The Presidential Communications Office (PCO) is in charge of disseminating the government's message to private media entities. It exercises supervision and control over state-owned media entities to disseminate the official messages properly and effectively in accordance with the communications plan. It is responsible for the accreditation and authentication of the credentials of foreign media correspondents in line with its primary task to cultivate relations and assist private media entities. It is formerly known as the Office of the Press Secretary (OPS) from April 28, 1986, to August 9, 2010, and June 30 to December 29, 2022, from the presidencies of Corazon Aquino to the first two months of her son Benigno Aquino III and the first six months of Bongbong Marcos, and Presidential Communications Operations Office (PCOO) from August 9, 2010, to June 30, 2022, during the rest of the administration of Benigno Aquino III and whole of Rodrigo Duterte's presidency.

The PCO Secretary holds a cabinet rank. He/she is assisted by an undersecretary for administration, finance and procurement; an undersecretary for operations, plans, and policies; an undersecretary for legal affairs; an undersecretary for media accreditation and relations; one undersecretary each for digital media, print media, and broadcast media services; an undersecretary for special concerns; an assistant secretary; and an electronic data processing division chief.

The PCO is composed of the following units and agencies:

- APO Production Unit
- Bureau of Communications Services
- Freedom of Information-Program Management Office
- Intercontinental Broadcasting Corporation
- National Printing Office
- People's Television Network
- Philippine Information Agency
- Philippine News Agency - News and Information Bureau
- Presidential Broadcast Service - Bureau of Broadcast Services (Radyo Pilipinas)
- Presidential Broadcast Staff - Radio Television Malacañang

=== Powers and functions ===
Pursuant to Section 3 of the Executive Order No. 2, s. 2022, the Office of the Press Secretary shall perform the following functions:

- Pronounce on behalf of the President the matters pertaining to his/her actions, policies, programs, official activities, and accomplishments.
- Develop and implement necessary guidelines and mechanisms pertaining to the delivery and dissemination of information on policies, programs, official activities, and achievements of the President and the Executive Branch.
- Coordinate the crafting, formulation, development, and enhancement of the messaging system under the Office of the President and the Executive Branch.
- Supervise and Coordinate with the agencies and Government-Owned and Controlled Corporations (GOCC)'s attached to the Office of the Press Secretary for purposes of further strengthening the system of information delivery to the public.
- Established and Maintain rapport with private media and other similar entities and stakeholders; and
- Perform such other functions as the Office of the President may assign from time to time.

=== Organization ===
The Office of the Press Secretary shall be organized as follows pursuant to Section 2 of the Executive Order No. 2, s. 2022:

(a) Office of the Secretary. The Office of the Secretary shall have an Assistant Secretary with support staff not more than twenty (20) personnel to be designated by the Press Secretary and approved by the Executive Secretary in the exigency of the service and in accordance with the civil service law and rules.

(b) Undersecretaries and Assistant Secretaries. In addition of the foregoing, there shall be Undersecretaries for the following areas. Each of which shall have Assistant Secretaries and Support Staff:

(I) Operations, Plans and Policies

(II) Administration, Finance and Procurement

(III) Legal Affairs

(IV) Media Accreditation and Relations

(V) Digital Media Services

(VI) Print Media Services and related Government-Owned and Controlled Corporations (GOCC)'s and attached agencies

(VII) Broadcast Media Services and related Government-Owned and Controlled Corporations (GOCC)'s and attached agencies; and

(VIII) Special Concerns

== Key officials ==
Secretary	Palace Press Officer
Lino Cayetano	Claire Castro

=== Office of the Secretary ===
- Lino Cayetano – Secretary
- Atty. Clarissa A. Castro – Press Undersecretary
- Cecilia M. Suerte Felipe, DPA, LPT – Director III, Chief of the Presidential News Desk (PND)

Undersecretaries

- Emerald Anne R. Ridao – Senior Undersecretary for Digital Media Services
- Jorjette B. Aquino – Undersecretary for Administration, Finance and GOCCs
- Gerald R. Baria – Undersecretary for Content Production
- Atty. Ronadale M. Zapata – Assistant Secretary for Legal, Administration, Finance and GOCCs
- Jose Maria M. Villarama II – Officer-in-Charge, Undersecretary for Strategic Communications and concurrent Assistant Secretary for Television

Assistant secretaries

- Claudyn Marie L. Caparon – Assistant Secretary for Inter-Agency Communications Operations
- Allan C. Francisco – Assistant Secretary for Integrated State Media News Operations
- Dale Q. Vera – Assistant Secretary for Media Accreditation and Relations
- Patricia Kayle S. Martin – Assistant Secretary for Digital Media and Communications
- Rowena H. Otida – Assistant Secretary for Cultural Affairs and International Engagements
- Ana Dominique M. Consulta – Assistant Secretary for Infrastructure Communications (Build Better More Cluster)
- Faith B. De Guia – Assistant Secretary for Asset Management and Communication for Disaster Preparedness and Response

Bureau and service directors

- Nicole M. Poyaoan – Director III, Integrated State Media News Operations
- Maria Waywaya B. Macalma – Director III, Television Communications
- Rowena S. Quiogue – Director III, Administration
- Sheryll Anne M. Lizarondo – Director III, Print Media Communications
- Atty. Rufino Gerard G. Moreno III – Director III, Financial Management Service

Division chiefs

- Ma. Alma A. Francisco – Budget Division
- Ma. Teresa L. Ubas – Accounting Division
- Gerald M. Bautista – General Services Division
- Rochelle I. Rubenecia – Human Resource Development Division
- Mary Willen DJ Renomeron – Procurement Division
- Atty. Enzo Emmanuel P. Toledo – Legal Division
- Krizia Casey P. Avejar – Communications and Capacity Development Division
- Ma. Danica Andeo Orcullo – Policy, Planning, and Support Division
- Eden Darlene A. Mendoza – Compliance Monitoring Division
- Jose L. Ogrimen Jr. – Information and Communications Technology (ICT) Division

Attached agency, bureau and office heads

PCO Integrated State Media

- Katherine Chloe S. De Castro – Director General, Philippine Information Agency (PIA)
- Demetrio C. Pasco, Jr. – Executive Editor, Philippine News Agency (PNA)
- Alan Allanigue - OIC Bureau Director/Head of Agency- Presidential Broadcast Service - Bureau of Broadcast Services (BBS) - Radyo Pilipinas
- Lino Edgardo S. Cayetano - General Manager, People's Television Network, Inc. (PTV 4)
- Jose C. Policarpio Jr. – President and CEO, Intercontinental Broadcasting Corporation (IBC 13)

Other attached agencies

- Jereco O. Paloma – Officer in Charge, News and Information Bureau (NIB)
- Atty. Revsee A. Escobedo – Director IV, National Printing Office (NPO)
- Atty. Gil Carlos R. Puyat IV – President, APO Production Unit, Inc.
- Arlene A. Barrientos – Officer in Charge, Bureau of Communications Services
- Franz Gerard R. Imperial – Executive Director, Presidential Broadcast Staff-Radio Television Malacañang (PBS-RTVM)

== Units under the Presidential Communications Office ==
With the reorganization of the PCOO under President Bongbong Marcos, most units previously under the agency were transferred to the Presidential Communications Office.

=== Presidential News Desk ===
The Presidential News Desk (PND) functions as the newsroom of Malacañang Palace. It gathers and disseminates information, such as press and photograph releases, and official statements from the Palace, on a daily basis.

The PND operates from Sundays to Saturdays, 5:00 AM to 7:00 PM. It is headed by a chief editor and is composed of a managing editor, deskmen, and reporters. Other units, which support the PND are Electronic Data Processing, Transcription and Monitoring, and Photographs.

Francisco Tatad conceived the PND. He was the Press Secretary to President Ferdinand Marcos. It was then called the Central Desk and was located in the Mabini Building. During the administration of President Corazon C. Aquino, Press Secretary Benigno Teodoro relegated the Central Desk, which became the News and Reportorial Section, as a section of the Presidential Press Staff. Under the Ramos administration, Press Secretary Rodolfo Reyes strengthened presidential coverage and set up the PND.

=== Philippine Information Agency ===

The Philippine Information Agency (PIA), established by Executive Order No. 100, is the main development communication arm of the government.

The PIA directly serves the Presidency and the executive branch of the national, regional and provincial levels through its 16 regional offices and 71 provincial information centers. Its core services include: information gathering/research, production and dissemination, and institutional development and capacity-building focusing on alliance-building, networking, communication-related training, consultancy and technical assistance. The PIA is also the advertising arm of the government.

It is headed by a director general with a rank of undersecretary and four deputy director generals, four assistant director generals, staff directors in the central office, regional directors in the regional offices, and more than 500 permanent and contractual employees. It works closely with other government agencies, in particular the National Printing Office in the production of information materials.

Its tagline is "Empowering Communities". The PIA works with community stakeholders, including local government units, line agencies, private entities, schools, colleges and universities, civil society organizations, and other groups in ensuring proper dissemination of information at the grassroots level. The agency advocates responsible sharing of information and responsible use of social media. Its current management and personnel work with the mantra and belief that "a well-informed Filipino is an empowered Filipino".

Currently, the PIA is under the direct supervision of the Office of the President and absorbed offices previously under the PCOO, namely the Bureau of Communications Services, the Freedom of Information – Project Management Office, and the Good Governance Office.

=== Bureau of Communications Services ===
The Bureau of Communications Services was an attached agency of the PCOO that is tasked to provide materials and services related to various functions of the Presidency, PCOO and the general public. It also owns Balita Central, a tabloid newspaper which is published bi-monthly through its official website and at selected LRT Line 2 stations. It also produces information materials for state events such as the anniversary of the People Power Revolution, Araw ng Kalayaan celebrations, and others.

It is currently absorbed by the Philippine Information Agency as ordered by Bongbong Marcos's Executive Order No. 2 s. 2022.

=== Presidential Broadcast Staff – Radio Television Malacañang ===

Created by President Corazon C. Aquino under Executive Order No. 297 on July 25, 1987, the Presidential Broadcast Staff – Radio Television Malacañang is tasked to provide the necessary media services, video and audio, to the incumbent president, to document all official engagements, and to make available to the public accurate and relevant information on the activities, programs and pronouncements of the national leadership.

The agency is involved in television coverage and documentation, news and public affairs syndication of all the activities of the President, either live or delayed telecast through government or private collaborating networks.

Since February 13, 2023, the agency is under the control and supervision of the PCO in accordance with Bongbong Marcos' Executive Order No. 16 s. 2023. The agency was under the Presidential Management Staff.

=== Media networks ===
There are two government-run television networks, namely the People's Television Network (PTV-4), and the Intercontinental Broadcasting Corporation (IBC-13). The Presidential Broadcast Service-Bureau of Broadcast Services (PBS-BBS) constitutes the government radio network. PCO still holds 20% minority stake in the Radio Philippines Network (RPN-9).

IBC-13 and RPN-9 were sequestered by the Presidential Commission on Good Government after the fall of the Marcos dictatorship. However, plans are being made to privatize IBC-13 and RPN-9 within two years to raise money. According to the 2009 report of the Presidential Commission on Good Government (PCGG), IBC-13 is valued at PHP 3.074 billion while RPN-9 is valued at PHP 1.3 billion.

=== National Printing Office ===

The National Printing Office (NPO) was established by Executive Order No. 285 on July 25, 1987. Executive Order No. 285 abolished the General Services Administration and transferred its functions to other agencies. Its Government Printing Offices were merged with the printing units of the PIA. The NPO is mandated by Executive Order No. 285 to print forms, official ballots, public documents, and public information materials.

=== News and Information Bureau ===
The News and Information Bureau's main aim is to provide services relating to the development and formulation of a domestic and foreign information program for the Government in general, and the Presidency in particular, including the development of strategies for the dissemination of information on specific government programs. It is composed of the following divisions:

- Finance and Administrative Division
- Presidential Press Staff
- Media Accreditation and Relations Division/International Press Center
- Philippine News Agency

=== OP Web Development Office ===
The OP Web Development Office, commonly referred to as the President's New Media Team, is responsible for the establishment and management of the President's Official Website and Official Presence on social networking channels such as Facebook, Twitter, and YouTube. It is also partly responsible for the feedback mechanism of the President wherein it receives the comments, concerns and suggestions through the Contact Us section of the President's website. It is also responsible for the President's Social Media engagement and in maximizing the use of new technologies to further the President's agenda, policies and programs.

=== Presidential Communications Development and Strategic Planning Office ===

The Presidential Communications Development and Strategic Planning Office (PCDSPO) ensures that all aspects of communications are covered, to ensure that the administration's message has been delivered successfully. This includes market research and polling. It devises the communications strategy to promote the President's agenda throughout all media, and among the many people with whom the administration interacts. This can include, but is not limited to, the State of the Nation address, televised press conferences, statements to the press, and radio addresses. This office also works closely with cabinet-level departments and other executive agencies, in order to create a coherent strategy through which the president's message can be disseminated.

During the administration of former president Benigno Aquino III, the PCDSPO head held a cabinet rank. The head was supported by a deputy of undersecretary rank, a chief of staff, an assistant secretary for messaging, and an electronic data processing division chief. After Rodrigo Duterte became the President in 2016, the PCDSPO was merged with the PCOO, thus effectively abolishing the PCDSPO. The PCOO was renamed as the Presidential Communications Office before it was reverted to Presidential Communications Operations Office.

Prior to June 30, 2016, the PCDSPO was composed of the following units and agencies, all of which were under the PCOO:

- Presidential Message Staff
- The OP Correspondence Office (previously placed under the Office of the Communications Director from the Presidential Management Staff per E.O. No. 348, August 11, 2004
- Media Research and Development Staff created by E.O. No. 297, July 25, 1987, from the Office of the Press Secretary
- The Presidential Museum and Library
- The Official Gazette
- The Speech Writers Group (previously placed under the Office of the Communications Director from the Presidential Management Staff per E.O. No. 348, August 11, 2004

== Controversies ==
During the Duterte administration, the PCOO has been criticized for various errors and lapses committed by the office, including what one lawmaker called a "revisionist attempt to whitewash the dark years of martial law". The Secretary of the PCOO assured Congress that it will not repeat the office's mistakes.

In March 2018, the News and Information Bureau released a transcript to reporters of an interview erroneously attributed to the President of the Philippines which was in fact an interview with an impersonator.

In their 2020 annual report, the Commission on Audit flagged the PCOO for the mass hiring of employees under contract service worth PH₱70.6 million. Speculation cited that they're hiring them as "online trolls" to attack critics of the government, in which the state media agency denied the claim.
