= Noli de Castro =

Vice President of the Philippines from 2004 to 2010

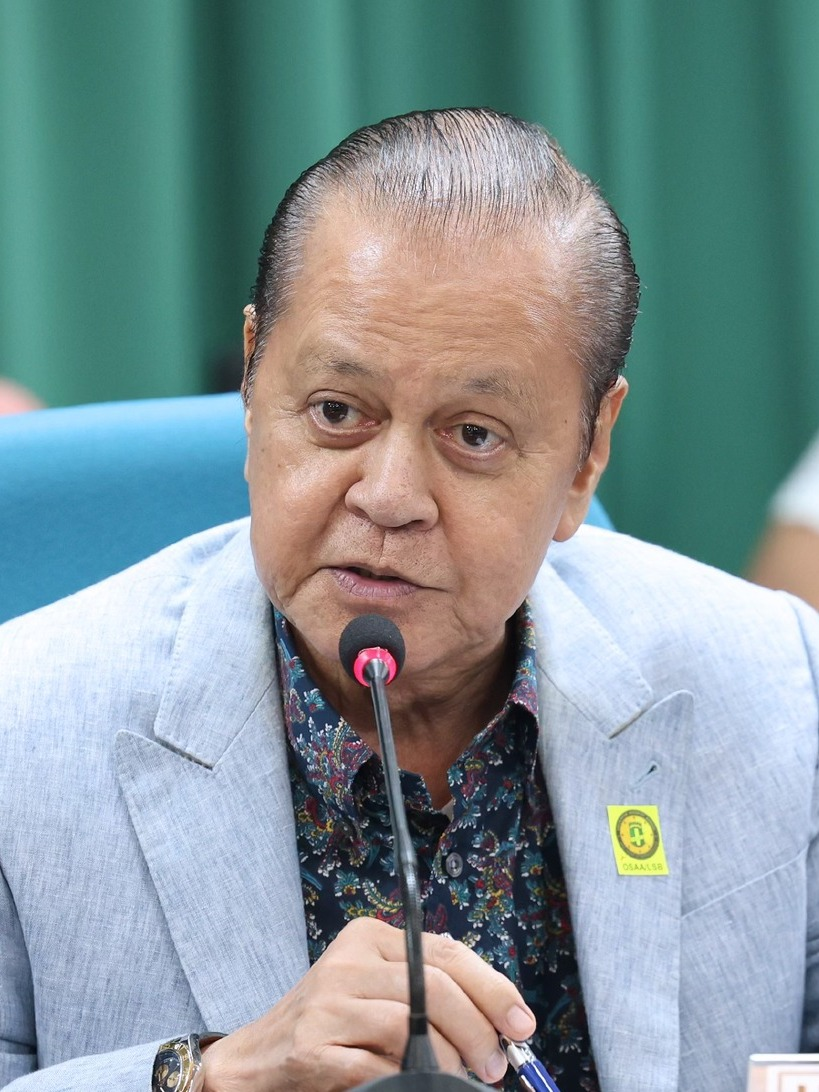
- De Castro in 2025

12th Vice President of the Philippines
- In office June 30, 2004 – June 30, 2010
- President: Gloria Macapagal Arroyo
- Preceded by: Teofisto Guingona Jr.
- Succeeded by: Jejomar Binay

Presidential Adviser for Overseas Filipino Workers
- In office August 11, 2004 – June 30, 2010
- President: Gloria Macapagal Arroyo
- Succeeded by: Jejomar Binay

2nd Chairman of the Housing and Urban Development Coordinating Council
- In office June 30, 2004 – June 30, 2010
- President: Gloria Macapagal Arroyo
- Preceded by: Mike Defensor
- Succeeded by: Jejomar Binay

Senator of the Philippines
- In office June 30, 2001 – June 30, 2004 (Note: Original term until June 30, 2007; resigned to sit as Vice President.)

Personal details
- Born: Manuel Leuterio de Castro Jr. July 6, 1949 (age 77) Pola, Oriental Mindoro, Philippines
- Party: Aksyon (2021–present)
- Other political affiliations: Independent (2001–2021)
- Spouses: Pacita Torralba (sep. 1978; ann. 1998) Arlene Sinsuat (m. 1991; died 2021)
- Children: 3, including Kat
- Education: University of the East (BS)
- Occupation: Journalist; anchorman
- Nickname: Kabayan; Noli
- TV/radio shows hosted: Kabayan radio commentator (1986–2001, 2010–2021, 2021–present); Magandang Gabi... Bayan host (1988–2004); TV Patrol anchor (1987–2001, 2010–2021, 2023–present); Radyo Patrol Balita Alas-Siyete/TeleBalita/TeleRadyo Balita/TeleRadyo Serbisyo Balita anchor (2011–2024); KBYN: Kaagapay ng Bayan host (2022–2023); Tao Po! correspondent (2023–2026)
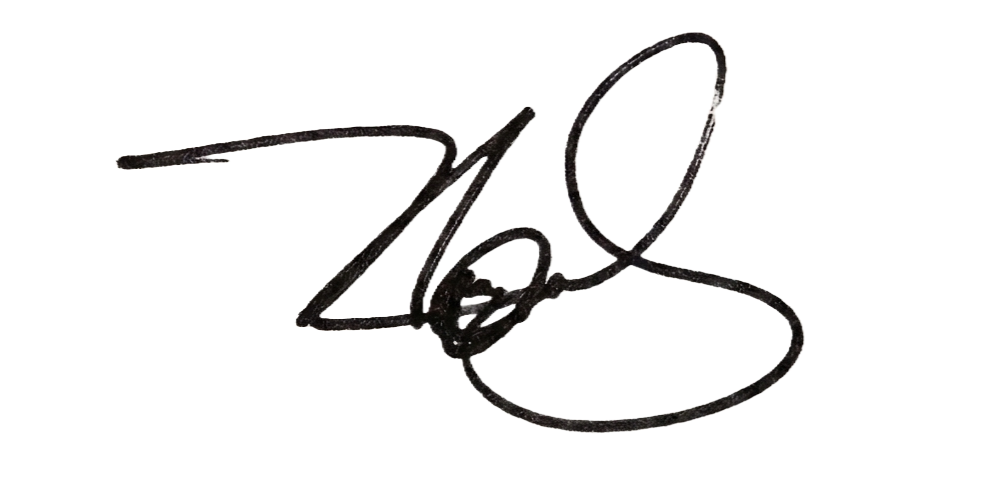
- Signature

Manuel "Noli" Leuterio de Castro Jr. (Tagalog pronunciation: [lɛ.ʊˌtɛːɾ.jo dɛ ˈkaːs.tɾo]; born July 6, 1949) is a Filipino broadcaster, journalist, and former politician who served as the 12th vice president of the Philippines from 2004 until 2010 under President Gloria Macapagal Arroyo. He was elected to the Senate of the Philippines in 2001 after receiving the most votes of any senator in the 2001 election.

With a career spanning over five decades, de Castro is among the most recognizable journalists in Philippine broadcast media. De Castro is currently the anchor of the radio program Kabayan on DZMM, DZMM TeleRadyo and PRTV Prime Media and the TV program TV Patrol on ANC, Kapamilya Channel, A2Z and ALLTV. (Note: TV Patrol is also airing on DZMM, DZMM TeleRadyo, PRTV Prime Media and FMR Radio Philippines.) He is one of the key television figures in favor of the Philippine drug war undertaken by the administration of President Rodrigo Duterte.

== Early life and education ==
De Castro was born as Manuel Leuterio de Castro Jr. in the town of Pola, Oriental Mindoro, at 4:00 pm on July 6, 1949. He is the fifth child of Manuel de Castro Sr. (born c. 1909) and Demetria (née Leuterio, born c. 1911). He studied at the University of the East in 1971 with a degree in Bachelor of Commerce, majoring in banking and finance. He later received a doctorate degree Honoris causa from the Polytechnic University of the Philippines.

== Broadcasting career ==
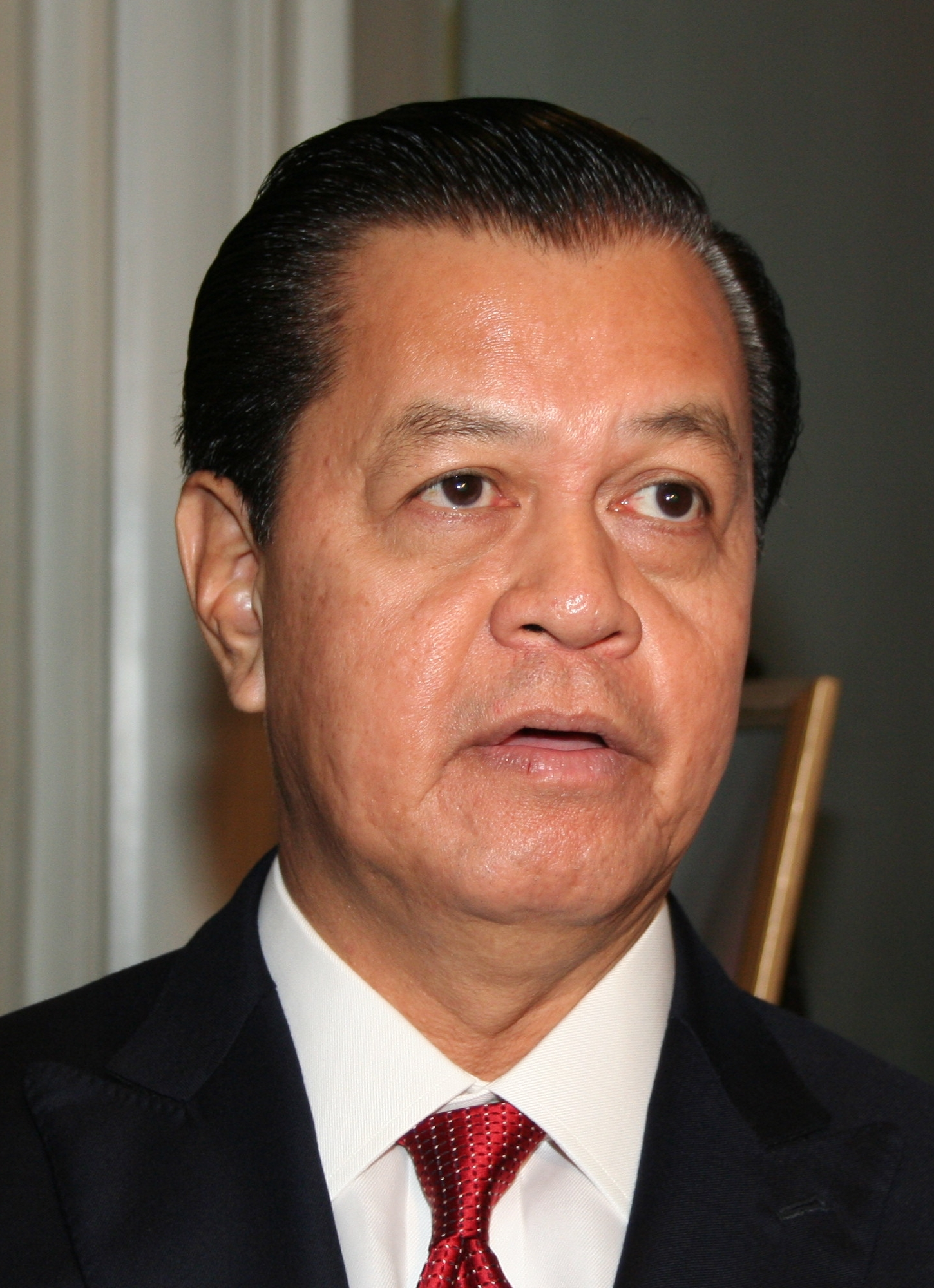
De Castro in 2009

De Castro began his broadcasting career during the presidency of Ferdinand Marcos. He worked as a field reporter for Johnny de Leon, a popular radio announcer at the time. He later became a radio announcer in RPN's DWWW station from 1982 to 1986.

After the ousting of Marcos in 1986, de Castro joined ABS-CBN, as the segment host for "At Your Service" of Good Morning! Philippines. He also joined DZMM, a radio station of ABS-CBN, as the anchorman of Kabayan, gaining the nickname "Kabayan Noli".

In 1987, he became one of the anchors of the news and public affairs show, TV Patrol; he later become the sole anchor on July 1, 1996. The following year, de Castro became the host of Magandang Gabi... Bayan, on August 20, 1988. In January 1999, he became TV Patrol's overall head of production and became the senior vice president of DZMM. On February 12, 2001, de Castro departed from his TV Patrol and Kabayan duties to run for Senator in the 2001 elections, however he still remained as the host of Magandang Gabi... Bayan even during his campaign period up to his senatorial term which lasted from 2001 until 2004. On February 7, 2004, de Castro departed from Magandang Gabi... Bayan to run for Vice President in the 2004 elections.

During his term as Vice President of the Philippines from 2004 to 2010, he co-anchored the program Para Sa'yo, Bayan, which aired weekly on DZMM from July 2, 2005, to June 28, 2010.

On July 12, 2010, Kabayan returned with de Castro as its anchor again. On November 8, 2010, he returned as an anchor of TV Patrol, replacing Julius Babao who left the newscast as the latter would move to Bandila alongside Karen Davila. He joined Korina Sanchez (later Bernadette Sembrano since August 2015) and Ted Failon (later Henry Omaga-Diaz from October 2020 to August 2024) for his second stint until October 7, 2021. On January 10, 2011, he started co-anchoring Radyo Patrol Balita: Alas Siyete (later renamed TeleBalita and TeleRadyo Balita in 2020) as it was combined with Kabayan.

He had been a staunch critic of almost all programs of President Benigno Aquino III, who has criticized former President Arroyo, de Castro's running mate in the 2004 elections. He has been known to fire tirades against Aquino throughout Aquino's presidency (which ended in June 2016). During the administration of President Rodrigo Duterte, however, he became meek as former President Arroyo had close ties with Duterte. De Castro has been criticized for perceived misogyny, homophobia and transphobia in live television. In 2018, he was being eyed by the Duterte administration for a possible return in politics under the new administration. De Castro supports the Philippine drug war. De Castro, along with Persida Acosta, amplified the possibility of Dengvaxia vaccination, which began during former President Aquino's term, as the cause of death of children in the Philippines. It was later proven by the World Health Organization and the Philippine Department of Health that Dengvaxia is safe and that the initial deaths of children were not connected with Dengvaxia. Various organizations have blamed de Castro and Acosta for their misinformation which led to the deaths of numerous Filipino youths due to a "vaccination scare campaign".

On October 7, 2021, de Castro temporarily ended his broadcasting duties to run for senator in 2022. However, he shortly withdrew his candidacy for senator. On November 8, 2021, he returned to ABS-CBN and resumed as anchor for both TeleRadyo Balita and Kabayan on TeleRadyo and Kapamilya Channel. He also became the host of the new public affairs program KBYN: Kaagapay ng Bayan on Kapamilya Channel, TeleRadyo and A2Z; it aired until January 1, 2023. On January 9, 2023, he returned to TV Patrol for his third stint, joining Karen Davila, Bernadette Sembrano and Henry Omaga-Diaz (later Alvin Elchico since September 2024), coinciding with the celebration of the Feast of the Black Nazarene. On December 19, 2024, he took a temporarily leave from ABS-CBN until February 3, 2025. He also left his DZMM radio program Kabayan indefinitely, primarily because of health concerns, which has restricted him to appearing on TV Patrol, although he has taken multiple temporary leaves since then. Danny Buenafe is serving as the temporary anchor in his absence. On November 10, 2025, he took another temporarily leave from ABS-CBN and DZMM due to health issues.

== Political career ==
=== Senate career (2001–2004) ===
In the 2001 Philippine Senate election, de Castro garnered the most votes and was the top-notcher for that year, garnering over 16.2 million votes running as an independent under the Puwersa ng Masa coalition, the opposition coalition that backed ousted President Joseph Estrada.

De Castro's three-year stint in the Senate saw him author 252 bills and resolutions, including the Expanded Senior Citizens Act of 2002, Balikbayan Law of 2002, Quarantine Act and Newborn Screening Test Act of 2001.

De Castro did not finish his six-year term when he was elected to the vice presidency in the 2004 Philippine presidential election.

=== Vice presidency (2004–2010) ===
Vice presidential styles of Noli de Castro
- Reference style: His Excellency, The Honorable
- Spoken style: Your Excellency
- Alternative style: Mr. Vice President

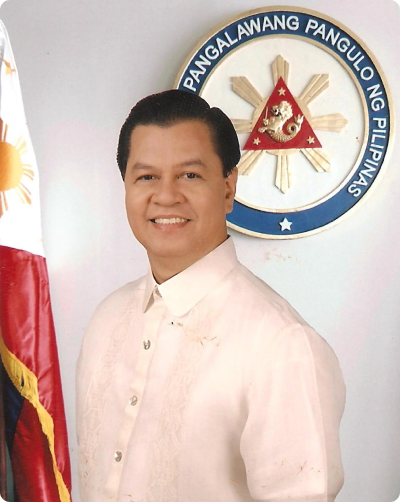
Official portrait, 2004

De Castro taking oath of office as Vice President in Cebu City on June 30, 2004

In the 2004 Philippine election, de Castro ran for vice president. He won by a narrow margin over Senator Loren Legarda, but an electoral protest was filed by the latter. The Supreme Court, acting as the Presidential Electoral Tribunal, dismissed the protest. He was appointed by President Arroyo as chairman of the Housing and Urban Development Coordinating Council (HUDCC). As HUDCC Chair, Vice President de Castro also serves as ex officio chairman of the Home Development Mutual Fund (HDMF or Pag-IBIG Fund), the Housing and Land Use Regulatory Board (HLURB), the National Housing Authority (Philippines) (NHA), the National Home Mortgage Finance Corporation (NHMFC) and the Social Housing Finance Corporation (SHFC) as well as ex officio vice chairman of the Home Guaranty Corporation (HGC). He has also been designated as concurrent presidential adviser on overseas Filipino workers, as alternate chairman of the National Anti-Poverty Commission, head of the Task Force Against Illegal Recruitment, price monitoring czar and cabinet officer for Regional Development Palawan.

De Castro was chairman of the Pag-IBIG Fund when the ₱6.6 billion housing scam involving Globe Asiatique (GA) scam took place. Throughout his vice presidency, de Castro had minimal limelight and was regarded only as "backup" for the then incumbent party coalition if ever President Arroyo was ousted.

=== 2010 presidential election ===
De Castro was initially a front runner in the 2010 presidential election. Being the vice president, he was a popular choice among older voters to replace outgoing president Arroyo. However, his lead was taken by Benigno Aquino III (who later won) after Aquino declared his intent to run for president. In December 2009, he did not file to be included on the ballot. In an interview conducted by Karen Davila, he announced that he would retire from politics at the end of his vice presidential term and intended to commit himself full time to broadcast journalism.

=== 2022 Senate election bid and subsequent withdrawal ===
De Castro initially announced his intention to run as senator for the 2022 Senate election. On October 7, 2021, he took oath as a new member of Aksyon Demokratiko and made his last appearance on his programs. He subsequently filed his certificate of candidacy on October 8. However, on October 13, he withdrew his candidacy.

== Electoral history ==
Electoral history of Noli de Castro
Year	Office	Party	Votes received				Result
Year	Office	Party	Total	%	P.	Swing	Result
2001	Senator of the Philippines	Independent	16,237,386	55.09%	1st	—N/a	Won
2004	Vice President of the Philippines	Independent	15,100,431	49.80%	1st	—N/a	Won

== Personal life ==
De Castro was initially married to Pacita Torralba, but they separated in 1978 and their marriage was eventually annulled in 1998. Together, they have a daughter named Manueli. He was later married to his second wife, Arlene Sinsuat, from 1991 until her death in 2021. Sinsuat had also served as the head of ABS-CBN News and Current Affairs. Together, they have two children: Katherine (also a journalist and TV host) and a son named Shamier.

In 2007, De Castro and his wife Arlene faced bigamy, falsification, and perjury charges filed by Arlene's two sons from her previous marriage, who alleged she married de Castro while her union with Juanito Olor was still subsisting and that de Castro falsely identified as a Muslim on their marriage certificate. The couple denied the allegations, with Arlene claiming that no wedding ceremony with Olor occurred, while De Castro maintained he had no knowledge of her prior union. In February 2008, the Quezon City Prosecutor’s Office dismissed all charges for lack of probable cause, accepting the defense that Arlene's first marriage was legally dissolved due to Olor's presumptive death.

=== Health ===
On November 10, 2025, De Castro took a leave of absence from his broadcasting duties due to health concerns. On December 14, 2025, his daughter Katherine confirmed that he had undergone a successful surgery for an undisclosed condition.

== Notes ==
Political offices
Preceded by Teofisto Guingona	Vice President of the Philippines; 2004–2010	Succeeded by Jejomar Binay
Preceded by Mike Defensor	Chairman of Housing and Urban Development Coordinating Council; 2004–2010	Succeeded by Jejomar Binay
Order of precedence
Preceded by Teofisto Guingona as Former Vice President	Order of Precedence of the Philippines (Ceremonial) as Former Vice President	Succeeded by Jejomar Binay as Former Vice President
