= Karambola =

Karambola may refer to:

- Carambola, a fruit
- Filipino variant of carrom, a tabletop game
- Colloquial Filipino term for multiple-vehicle collision
- Karambola (radio program), a political talk program
