= Pilipino Mirror =

Daily tabloid in the Philippines

- Type: Daily newspaper
- Format: Tabloid
- Owner: Filipino Mirror Media Group
- Founder: Antonio Cabangon-Chua
- Publisher: D. Edgard A. Cabangon
- Editor-in-chief: Rey Briones
- Associate editor: Ma. Ana S. Federigan
- Managing editor: Susana Cambri Abdullahi
- General manager: Jocelyn L. Sidayao
- Founded: April 16, 2012; 13 years ago (5,006 issues)
- Political alignment: Independent
- Language: Filipino, English
- Headquarters: 2/F Dominga Bldg. III, 2113 Chino Roces Ave. cor Dela Rosa St., Pio del Pilar, Makati
- Country: Philippines
- Circulation: Nationwide
- Sister newspapers: BusinessMirror
- Website: PilipinoMirror.com/

Pilipino Mirror (stylized as PILIPINO Mirror) is a daily tabloid in the Philippines. It is published by the Filipino Mirror Media Group, a division of the ALC Group of Companies owned by former Philippine ambassador to Laos Antonio Cabangon-Chua.

== Advertising slogans ==
- Salamín ng Katotohanan (Filipino, "Mirror of Truth") (April 16, 2012 – March 19, 2017)
- Unang Tabloid sa Negosyo (Filipino, "First Tabloid for Business") (March 20, 2017 - June 24, 2024)
- Katuwang sa Negosyo (Filipino, "Your Partner in Business") (June 25, 2025 – present)

== See also ==
- Business Mirror
- DWIZ
- Aliw Channel 23
- 97.9 Home Radio
- CNN Philippines
