= Larry Gadon =

Filipino politician and disbarred lawyer (born 1958)

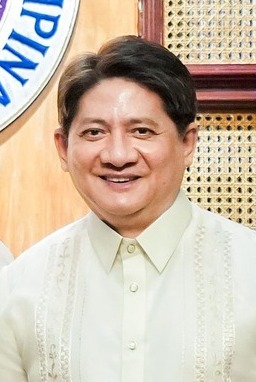
- Gadon in 2023

Presidential Adviser for Poverty Alleviation
- Incumbent
- Assumed office June 26, 2023
- President: Bongbong Marcos
- Preceded by: Position established

Personal details
- Born: Lorenzo Gacilo Gadon; March 1, 1958 (age 68) Roxas, Oriental Mindoro, Philippines
- Party: KBL (2015–present)
- Spouse: Bernadette de Leon (m. 1985)
- Children: 2
- Education: Far Eastern University (BS, LL.B.)
- Occupation: Politician, radio broadcaster
- Profession: Lawyer (disbarred)

Lorenzo "Larry" Gacilo Gadon (born March 1, 1958) is a Filipino politician and disbarred lawyer who currently serves as the Presidential Adviser for Poverty Alleviation for President Bongbong Marcos since 2023. Gadon ran for a senatorial seat in the 2016, 2019 and 2022 elections, all of which were unsuccessful. Gadon has gained notoriety for his use of vulgar language and his hardline stance against perceived liberals and communists. Since 2019, he is one of the co-hosts of Karambola on DWIZ-AM.

== Early life and education ==
Gadon was born on March 1, 1958, in Roxas, Oriental Mindoro to Sulpicio Gadon and Lazarita Gacilo.

He obtained both his Bachelor of Science in Commerce and Bachelor of Laws from Far Eastern University. He later passed the 1992 Philippine Bar Examination, which at that year had the lowest passing percentage (17.25%) in decades.

== Career ==
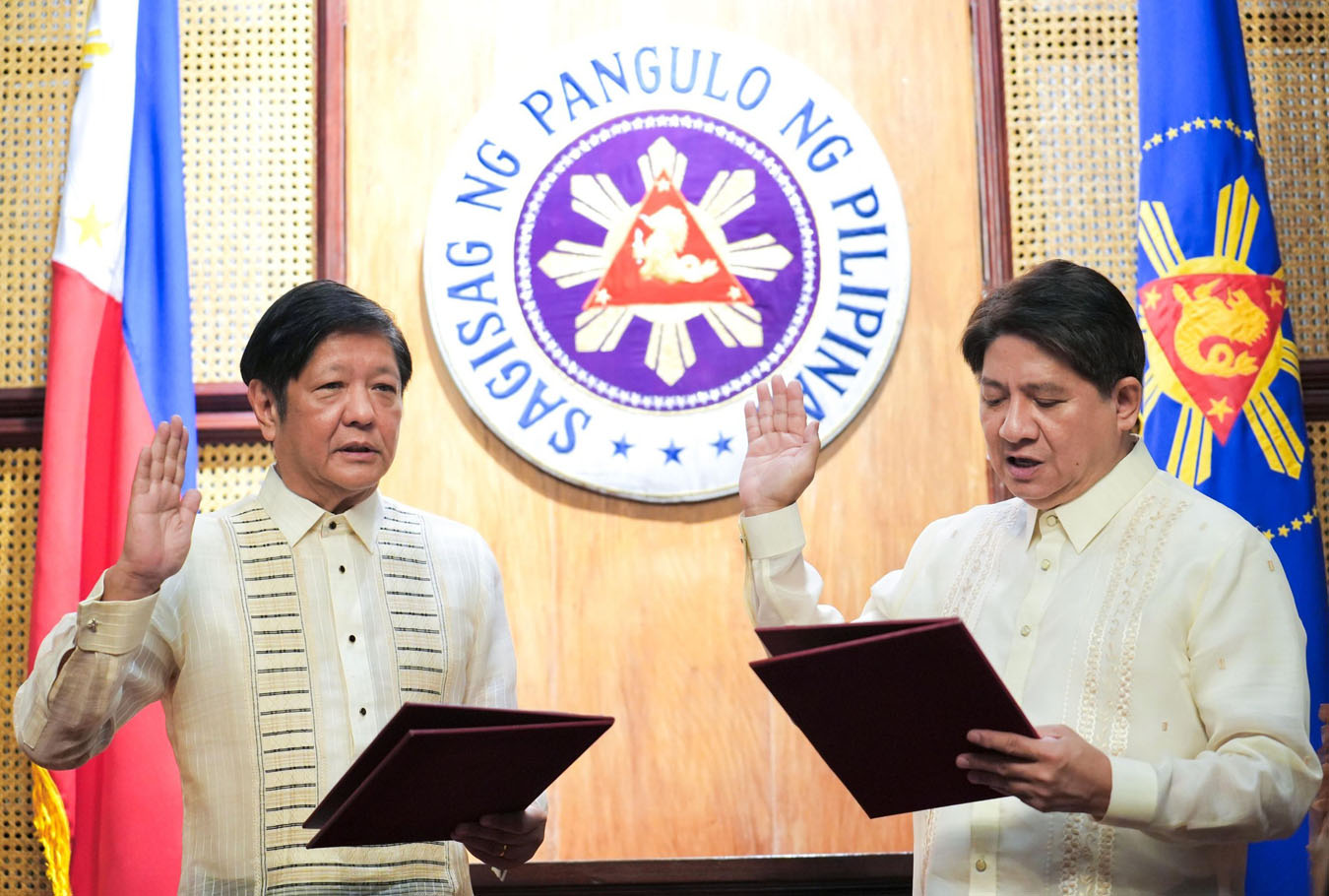
Gadon (right) is sworn in by President Bongbong Marcos (left) as Presidential Adviser on Poverty Alleviation in June 2023.

Gadon served as the Managing Partner of Gadon and Associates Law Office and as an Associate at Antonio Abad and Associates Law Office. He also served as Chairman of APU, AsiaGroup Philippines, Vice President of Kolonwel Trading Corporation, and Director of health institutions such as Our Lady of Lourdes International Medical Center and Perpetual Help Hospital Manila.

Gadon was part of the legal team and adviser of former President Gloria Macapagal Arroyo.

=== Senate bid ===
Gadon ran for senator in the 2016 elections under Kilusang Bagong Lipunan but failed to win a seat.

He again ran for senator in the 2019 midterm elections, which he again lost.

He ran for a third consecutive time in the 2022 elections, under the senatorial slate of the UniTeam alliance. Among his platforms were plans to amend the 1987 Constitution. He lost for a third time.

=== Cabinet career ===
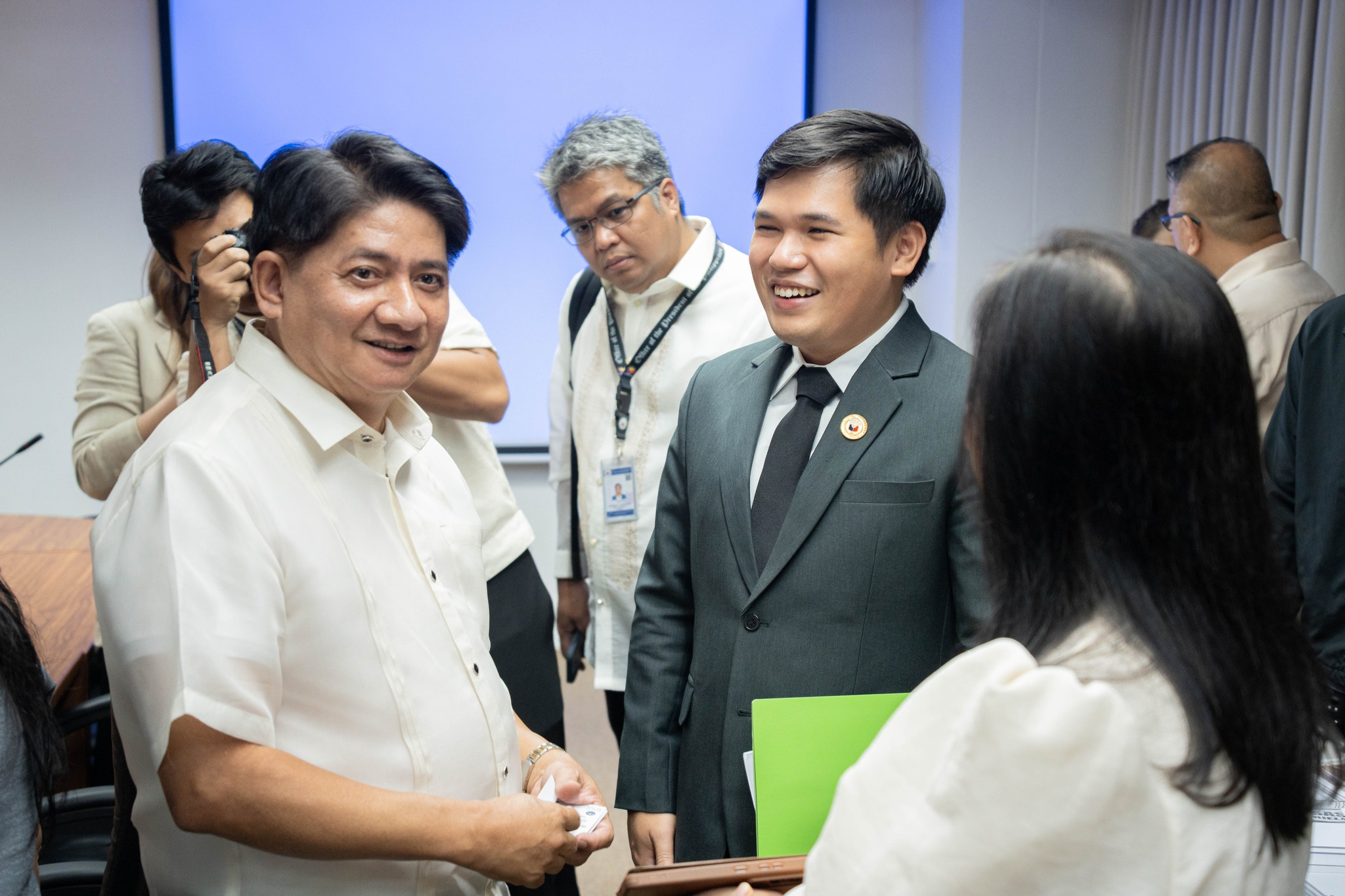
Gadon (left) at the Batasang Pambansa to attend a House Committee on Poverty Alleviation hearing in August 2025.

On June 26, 2023, he was appointed Presidential Adviser on Poverty Alleviation by President Bongbong Marcos; he took oath of office before Marcos on July 10. He promoted his version of a government feeding program called "Batang Busog, Malusog" (lit. transl. "Full child, healthy child!", with the initials BBM after the president) as one of his first projects to address youth malnutrition.

Two days later on June 28, Gadon was unanimously disbarred by the Supreme Court, citing his misogynistic, sexist, abusive, and repeated intemperate language. He was also cited in direct contempt for his "baseless allegations of bias" against Senior Associate Justice Marvic Leonen and Associate Justice Alfredo Benjamin Caguioa.

=== Legal complaints ===
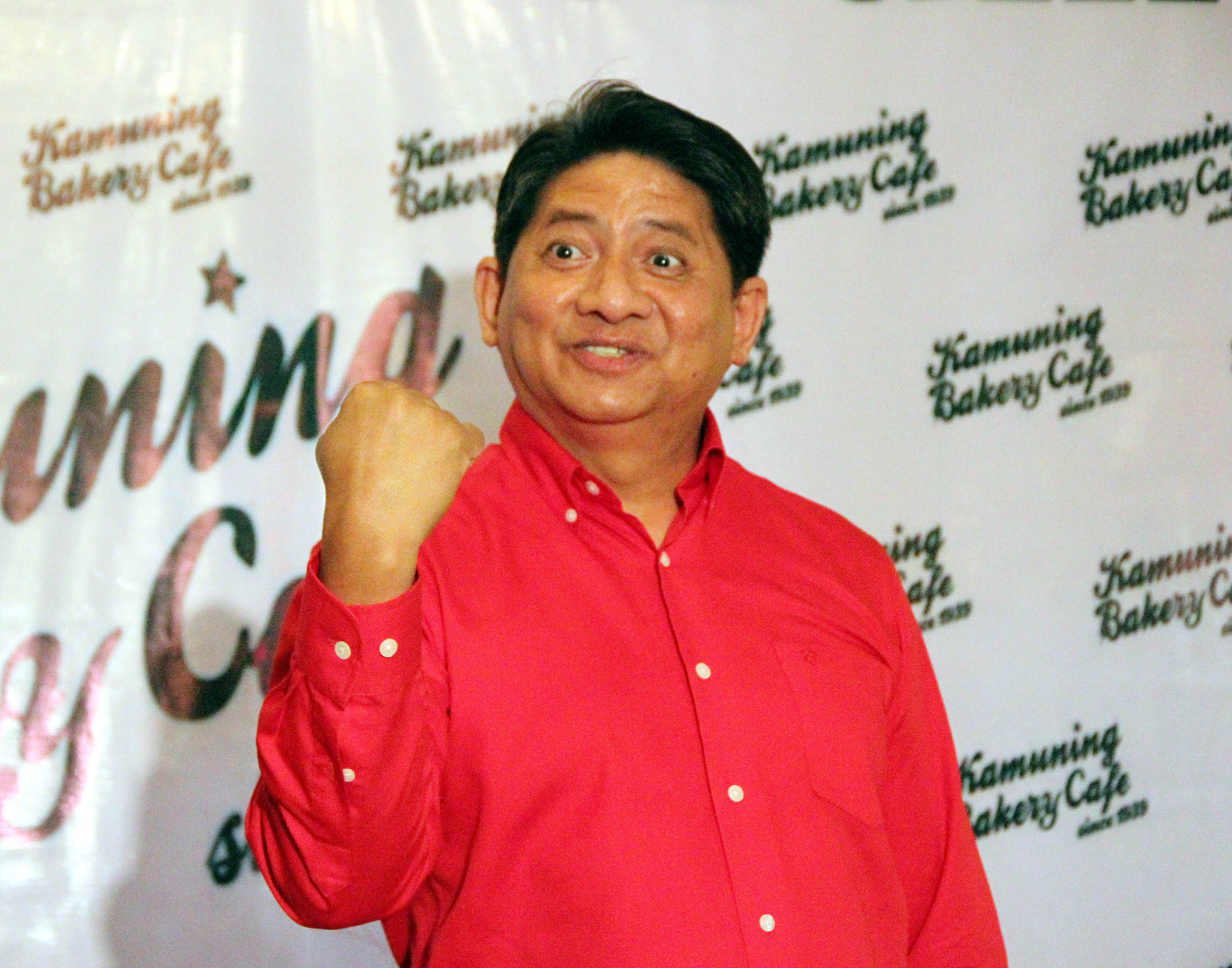
Gadon reacts happily following the nullification of Maria Lourdes Sereno's appointment as Chief Justice in 2018. Gadon filed an impeachment campaign against her.

In 2017, Gadon filed an impeachment complaint against Chief Justice Maria Lourdes Sereno, claiming Sereno's failure to be truthful in her Statement of Assets, Liabilities, and Net Worth (SALN) as well as tax misdeclarations and unauthorized expenses. After the impeachment process began, a quo warranto petition was filed on March 5, 2018, by Solicitor General Jose Calida to nullify her appointment. On May 11, 2018, the Supreme Court voted to nullify Sereno's appointment by a vote of 8–6. No impeachment trial took place as the petition rendered the complaint moot.

On December 7, 2020, Gadon represented Filipino League of Advocates for Good Government Secretary General Edwin Cordevilla in filing an impeachment complaint against Associate Justice Marvic Leonen. Prior to the complaint, Gadon requested access to Leonen's SALN to prepare a quo warranto petition but was rejected by the Supreme Court. The impeachment complaint was unanimously junked by the House of Representatives on May 27, 2021.

On November 27, 2024, Gadon filed a disbarment case before the Supreme Court against Vice President Sara Duterte on the ground that she claimed to have spoken with a contract killer to target President Bongbong Marcos, his wife Liza, and House Speaker Martin Romualdez in the event of her assassination. Gadon also added that he would file impeachment cases against all Supreme Court justices if they failed to act on the case. He also expressed regret in supporting Duterte, a fellow UniTeam candidate in 2022, and urged her to resign before she may be impeached in the upcoming 20th Congress. On July 30, 2025, Gadon was cited for contempt by lawyer Ferdinand Topacio before the Supreme Court for his comments against the Court's unanimous ruling that declared the impeachment complaint against Duterte as unconstitutional. As a response, he challenged Topacio to a singing contest "for a cause," mentioned that Topacio's clients are in jail, and accused him of using the case to seek attention.

=== Larry Gadon Live ===
Gadon announced that his new daytime show live television show on People's Television Network (PTV) titled Larry Gadon Live would have its first episode on May 29, 2024. In an interview on Bagong Pilipinas Ngayon, he said that he formed the program with Presidential Communications Office Secretary Cheloy Garafil and presidential adviser Cesar Chavez.

=== Philippine Coast Guard Auxiliary ===
In 2003, Gadon joined the Philippine Coast Guard Auxiliary as an auxiliary commander. On October 22, 2025, he took his oath as a rear admiral.

== Disbarment ==
At least four disbarment cases were filed against Gadon in 2018 for cursing and flashing his middle finger during a protest related to the Sereno case in Baguio. During the protest, Gadon referred to Sereno's supporters as "mga bobo" (lit. "idiots") and raised his middle finger at them. The video, as recorded by various media channels, went viral on Philippine social media and has been the subject of memes and parodies.

The Supreme Court of the Philippines imposed a three-month suspension on Gadon in 2019 for using “offensive” language towards a doctor in violation of the Code of Professional Responsibility of Lawyers.

On December 15, 2021, Gadon went on a profanity-laden rant against journalist Raissa Robles, who described then-presidential candidate Bongbong Marcos as a "tax evader" for his 1997 tax conviction. As a result, the Supreme Court suspended him indefinitely on January 4, 2022. A month later, Robles filed complaints for libel, cyberlibel and violation of the Safe Spaces Act against him for sexually harassing her.

On Wednesday, June 28, 2023, Gadon was disbarred by the Supreme Court of the Philippines with a vote of 15–0 over a viral video where he "repeatedly cursed and uttered profane remarks against journalist Raissa Robles". The high court found Gadon's video as "indisputably scandalous that it discredits the legal profession."

== Political positions ==
=== Ferdinand Marcos ===
Gadon does not believe in the alleged ill-gotten wealth of the Marcos family and supported the state burial of Ferdinand Marcos.

=== Bangsamoro Organic Law ===
Gadon was against Bangsamoro Organic Law during the 2016 elections. He has since changed his mind and supported it during his 2019 campaign, believing that it will end the decades-long conflict in Mindanao.

=== LGBT rights ===
Gadon is against same-sex marriage, believing that it violates the sanctity of marriage.

=== Freedom of Information ===
Gadon is in favor of the Freedom of Information Bill.

=== Communism ===
Gadon is a staunch anti-communist and opposes far-left groups such as the Communist Party of the Philippines, New People's Army, and the National Democratic Front.

== Controversies ==
=== Remarks against Moros ===
In a 2016 interview with journalist Kara David on GMA News TV's News to Go, Gadon said that he wants all Muslims or Moros, even children, killed by burning their homes through the Armed Forces, when he was asked about the problems on Moro rebels in Mindanao. As a result, two Moro lawyers and a peace advocate from Lanao del Sur filed separate disbarment complaints at the Supreme Court against Gadon. Gadon later issued an apology, stating that he was carried away by his emotions. Three years later, he clarified that he was not anti-Muslim and said that he was referring to troublemakers in Mindanao and only supported killing terrorists.

=== COVID-19 misinformation ===
On August 15, 2021, during the COVID-19 pandemic, Gadon was spotted in a public gathering wearing a face shield with a face mask taped over it. In a statement, Gadon claimed that the face masks are "only for a show" because stores refused entry to people not wearing them. On a Facebook live video, Gadon made multiple inaccurate claims about mask wearing and advocated alternative medicine such as traditional Chinese medicine and drinking vodka to "cure" COVID-19. Gadon also stated he does not "believe in masks" and the government "overreacted to the COVID paranoia."

Both the Department of Health and Philippine National Police warned Gadon that he may be arrested if he continued to violate quarantine protocols.

=== False claim on Benigno Aquino III's death ===
On June 24, 2021, Gadon falsely claimed on his radio program Karambola on DWIZ-AM that former president Benigno Aquino III died of HIV/AIDS while laughing about his demise. The former president's family later announced that renal disease, secondary to diabetes, was the cause of Aquino's death. In December 2021, another disbarment case was filed against him by complainants living with HIV for gross misconduct and breaching confidentiality on HIV-related information.

=== Grudge against Senior Associate Justice Leonen ===
In an interview with One News, Gadon answered to the hosts that he will wait for Senior Associate Justice Marvic Leonen to die first before he would ever try to have his disbarment reconsidered, despite the Supreme Court voted unanimously (15–0) for his disbarment. On August 17, 2023, the Integrated Bar of the Philippines expressed their contempt against Gadon's statements.

Gadon is open about his personal grudge against the magistrate, vexing him by mispronouncing his first name from "Marvic" to "Marivic", and would sometimes label him as "dilawan" (transl. yellow; derogatory term referring to Liberal Party and Aquino supporters) for having been appointed by former President Benigno Aquino III into his position in the Supreme Court in 2011. In 2020, Gadon claimed Leonen had no substantial experience in litigation, which were all debunked.

=== Gross Misconduct due to Perjury ===
On May 23, 2024, in a case titled A.C. No. 13842 (Garrido, Jr. v. Gadon), the Supreme Court found Gadon guilty of gross misconduct for committing perjury for making allegations in his impeachment complaint against Sereno that were not based on his personal knowledge or on any authentic records. He was found guilty of violating the lawyer's code of conduct for making false statements (Canon II, Section 11). The Court also ruled that Sereno's ultimate dismissal in a separate quo warranto petition did not absolve Gadon of his offense. He was ordered to pay a fine of ₱150,000.

== Electoral history ==
Electoral history of Larry Gadon
Year	Office	Party	Votes received				Result
Year	Office	Party	Total	%	P.	Swing	Result
2016	Senator of the Philippines	KBL	1,971,327	4.38%	27th	—N/a	Lost
2019	Senator of the Philippines	KBL	3,487,780	7.37%	28th	+2.99	Lost
2022	Senator of the Philippines	KBL	9,691,607	17.45%	20th	+10.08	Lost

Political offices
New office	Presidential Adviser for Poverty Alleviation; 2023–present	Incumbent
