= Mario Lipana =

Filipino accountant and government official

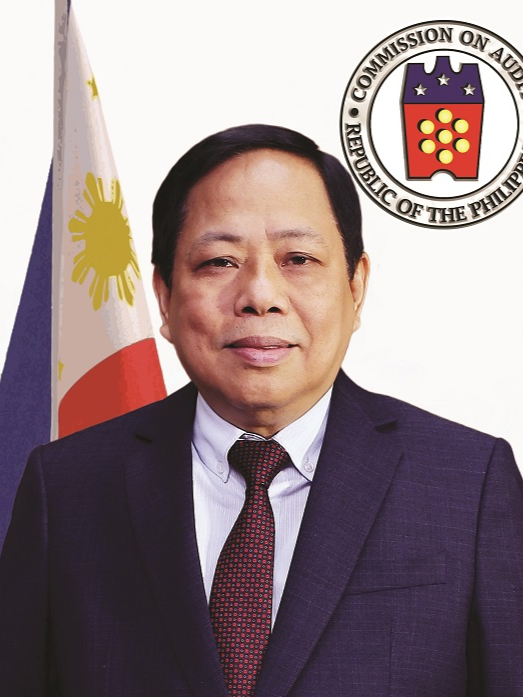
- Commissioner Mario G. Lipana

Commissioner of the Commission on Audit
- Incumbent
- Assumed office January 26, 2022
- Appointed by: Rodrigo Duterte
- Preceded by: Jose A. Fabia

Personal details
- Born: February 15, 1960 San Ildefonso, Bulacan, Philippines
- Education: Bachelor of Science in Accountancy
- Alma mater: Baliuag Colleges
- Profession: Certified Public Accountant
- Website: Official Profile

Mario Gonzales Lipana (born February 15, 1960) is a Filipino Certified Public Accountant and government official who has served as a Commissioner of the Commission on Audit (COA) since January 26, 2022. He was nominated by President Rodrigo Duterte and confirmed by the Commission on Appointments on January 26, 2022, for a term expiring on February 2, 2027, succeeding Commissioner Jose A. Fabia.

== Early life and education ==
Lipana hails from San Ildefonso, Bulacan. He obtained his Bachelor of Science in Accountancy degree from Baliuag Colleges in 1982.

== Career ==
Lipana began his career at COA in 1983, rising through the ranks over nearly four decades. He has extensive experience in auditing both local and international government entities, covering financial and compliance audits. His previous positions include:

- Supervising Auditor for local government units in Region IV-A (CALABARZON) from 1997 to 2001.
- Supervising Auditor for various national government agencies, including the Senate, Office of the President, and the Commission on Elections from 2003 to 2015.
- Supervising Auditor of the City of Manila - Regional Director of COA Regional Office No. IV-A and concurrent Director of the Intelligence and Confidential Fund Audit Office under the Office of the Chairperson in 2017

== As Commissioner ==
Upon his appointment, Lipana took his oath of office before COA Chairperson Michael G. Aguinaldo on January 27, 2022. He attended his first COA-Commission Proper meeting on January 28, 2022, where he emphasized the importance of ensuring accountability of public resources in the government.

== Personal life ==
Mario Lipana is married to Marilou Laurio Lipana, who is the first nominee of the Vendors Party-list, officially known as Vendors Samahan ng mga Maninindang Pilipino. She is also the president and general manager of Olympus Mining and Builders Group Philippines Corporation, and leads Iron Ore, Gold and Vanadium Resources (Phils) Inc., as well as Gembar Enterprises, companies that have secured various government contracts.

Her involvement in these businesses has led to a disqualification case filed by election watchdog Kontra Daya, which argued that she and other nominees of the party-list do not belong to the marginalized groups they claim to represent.
