= Commission on Audit =

Philippine independent constitutional commission

Commission on Audit Komisyon sa Awdit
- Seal

Agency overview
- Formed: May 8, 1899
- Preceding agencies: Office of the Auditor of the Philippines Islands; Bureau of the Insular Auditor; Bureau of Audits; General Auditing Office
- Type: Constitutional Commission
- Jurisdiction: National
- Headquarters: Diliman, Quezon City
- Employees: 8,065 (2024)
- Annual budget: ₱12.46 billion (2020)
- Agency executive: Douglas Michael Mallillin, Acting Chairperson
- Website: www.coa.gov.ph

The Commission on Audit (COA; Filipino: Komisyon sa Awdit) is an independent constitutional commission established by the Constitution of the Philippines. It has the primary function to examine, audit and settle all accounts and expenditures of the funds and properties of the Philippine government.

The Commission on Audit is a creation of the 1973 constitution. It was preceded by the Office of the Auditor in 1899, renamed as the Bureau of the Insular Auditor in 1900, then to the Bureau of Audits in 1905. The 1935 constitution created the General Auditing Office (GAO), and was led by the Auditor General. The 1973 constitution renamed the GAO to the Commission on Audit, a collegial body led by a chairman, with two commissioners. That setup was retained by the 1987 constitution.

The other two Constitutional Commissions are the Commission on Elections and Civil Service Commission.

== Members ==
=== Description ===
The Commission on Audit is composed of a chairperson and two Commissioners. They must be natural-born citizens of at least thirty-five years of age, and must be either a Certified Public Accountant or a lawyer. The members of the commission are appointed by the President of the Philippines, with the consent of the Commission of Appointments, for a term of seven years without reappointment.

In Funa v. Villar, the Supreme Court ruled that a Commissioner can only be appointed as chairman if the unexpired term for the office of chairman and the term that the Commissioner had already served does not exceed seven years. In such case, the Commissioner promoted as chairman would serve the unexpired term of the chairman, forfeiting the duration of his original term as Commissioner. This was based on a case where Reynaldo A. Villar, who was appointed commissioner in 2004, was then appointed as chairman in 2008, making him serve out eleven years in total. Villar resigned before he served out the full seven-year term as chairman, but prior to the resolution of the case.

The 1987 Constitution staggered the terms of the members of the Constitutional Commissions. Of the first appointees, the chairman would serve seven years (1st line), a Commissioner would serve five years (2nd line), and another Commissioner would serve three years (3rd line).

The members of the commission can only be removed from office via death, resignation or impeachment.

=== Current composition ===
Current composition
Position	Line	Picture	Name	Tenure started	Term scheduled to end	Appointed by
Chairman	1st	Official Portrait	Douglas Michael Mallillin	November 16, 2026	February 2, 2029 (Note: See Commission on Audit (Philippines), specifically Funa vs. Villar)	Bongbong Marcos
Commissioner	2nd		Mario Lipana	January 26, 2022	February 2, 2027	Rodrigo Duterte
Commissioner	3rd	vacant (Note: Position vacant due to the appointment of Douglas Michael Mallillin as ad interim chairman of COA to replace Gamaliel Cordoba, who was then appointed as Associate Justice of the Supreme Court)				

=== Former auditors general ===
The General Auditing Office was headed by the Auditor-General. The Auditor-General has a 10-year term, is appointed by the president, is confirmed by the Commission on Appointments, and can only be removed via impeachment by Congress. This agency preceded the present-day commission.

Image	Auditor General	Term	Appointed by
	Jaime Hernandez	1935–1941	Manuel L. Quezon
	Serafin Marabut	1940s	Manuel L. Quezon
	Teofilo Sison	1940s	Jose P. Laurel
	Manuel Agregado	1940s	Sergio Osmeña
	Sotero Cabahug	1945–1946	Manuel Roxas
	Manuel Agregado	1946–1957	Elpidio Quirino
	Pedro Gimenez	1957–1965	Carlos P. Garcia
	Ismael Mathay Sr.	January 23, 1965 – September 19, 1975	Ferdinand Marcos

=== Membership history since 1987 ===
Term started	Chairman (Line 1)	Commissioner (Line 2)	Commissioner (Line 3)	Appointed by
February 2, 1987	Teofisto Guingona Jr. March 10, 1986 – March 1987 Eufemio Domingo March 1987 – April 1993 Pascacio Banaria April 1993 – February 2, 1994	Bartolome Fernandez Jr. February 2, 1987 – February 2, 1992	Eufemio Domingo April 1986 – March 1987 Alberto Cruz March 1987 – February 2, 1990	Corazon Aquino February 25, 1986 – June 30, 1992
February 2, 1990	Teofisto Guingona Jr. March 10, 1986 – March 1987 Eufemio Domingo March 1987 – April 1993 Pascacio Banaria April 1993 – February 2, 1994	Bartolome Fernandez Jr. February 2, 1987 – February 2, 1992	Rogelio Espiritu February 2, 1990 – February 2, 1997	Corazon Aquino February 25, 1986 – June 30, 1992
February 2, 1992	Teofisto Guingona Jr. March 10, 1986 – March 1987 Eufemio Domingo March 1987 – April 1993 Pascacio Banaria April 1993 – February 2, 1994	Sofronio Ursal March 16, 1992 – February 2, 1999	Rogelio Espiritu February 2, 1990 – February 2, 1997	Corazon Aquino February 25, 1986 – June 30, 1992
February 2, 1994	Celso Gangan March 25, 1994 – February 2, 2001	Sofronio Ursal March 16, 1992 – February 2, 1999	Rogelio Espiritu February 2, 1990 – February 2, 1997	Fidel V. Ramos June 30, 1992 – June 30, 1998
February 2, 1997	Celso Gangan March 25, 1994 – February 2, 2001	Sofronio Ursal March 16, 1992 – February 2, 1999	Raul Flores February 3, 1997 – February 2, 2004	Fidel V. Ramos June 30, 1992 – June 30, 1998
February 2, 1999	Celso Gangan March 25, 1994 – February 2, 2001	Emmanuel Dalman February 3, 1999 – February 2, 2006	Raul Flores February 3, 1997 – February 2, 2004	Joseph Estrada June 30, 1998 – January 20, 2001
February 2, 2001	Guillermo Carague February 2. 2001 – February 2, 2008	Emmanuel Dalman February 3, 1999 – February 2, 2006	Raul Flores February 3, 1997 – February 2, 2004	Gloria Macapagal Arroyo January 20, 2001 – June 30, 2010
February 2, 2004	Guillermo Carague February 2. 2001 – February 2, 2008	Emmanuel Dalman February 3, 1999 – February 2, 2006	Reynaldo Villar February 7, 2004 – February 2, 2008 Evelyn San Buenaventura January 8, 2010 – February 2, 2011	Gloria Macapagal Arroyo January 20, 2001 – June 30, 2010
February 2, 2006	Guillermo Carague February 2. 2001 – February 2, 2008	Juanito Espino Jr. May 11, 2006 – February 2, 2013	Reynaldo Villar February 7, 2004 – February 2, 2008 Evelyn San Buenaventura January 8, 2010 – February 2, 2011	Gloria Macapagal Arroyo January 20, 2001 – June 30, 2010
February 2, 2008	Reynaldo Villar February 2, 2008 – April 5, 2011 Maria Gracia Pulido Tan April 5, 2011 – February 2, 2015	Juanito Espino Jr. May 11, 2006 – February 2, 2013	Reynaldo Villar February 7, 2004 – February 2, 2008 Evelyn San Buenaventura January 8, 2010 – February 2, 2011	Gloria Macapagal Arroyo January 20, 2001 – June 30, 2010
February 2, 2011	Reynaldo Villar February 2, 2008 – April 5, 2011 Maria Gracia Pulido Tan April 5, 2011 – February 2, 2015	Juanito Espino Jr. May 11, 2006 – February 2, 2013	Heidi Mendoza April 18, 2011 – November 11, 2015 Isabel Dasalla-Agito January 16, 2016 – February 2, 2018	Benigno Aquino III June 30, 2010 – June 30, 2016
February 2, 2013	Reynaldo Villar February 2, 2008 – April 5, 2011 Maria Gracia Pulido Tan April 5, 2011 – February 2, 2015	Rowena Guanzon March 18, 2013 – January 2014 Jose Fabia May 2, 2014 – February 2, 2020	Heidi Mendoza April 18, 2011 – November 11, 2015 Isabel Dasalla-Agito January 16, 2016 – February 2, 2018	Benigno Aquino III June 30, 2010 – June 30, 2016
February 2, 2015	Michael Aguinaldo March 24, 2015 – February 2, 2022	Rowena Guanzon March 18, 2013 – January 2014 Jose Fabia May 2, 2014 – February 2, 2020	Heidi Mendoza April 18, 2011 – November 11, 2015 Isabel Dasalla-Agito January 16, 2016 – February 2, 2018	Benigno Aquino III June 30, 2010 – June 30, 2016
February 2, 2018	Michael Aguinaldo March 24, 2015 – February 2, 2022	Rowena Guanzon March 18, 2013 – January 2014 Jose Fabia May 2, 2014 – February 2, 2020	Roland Pondoc February 6, 2018 – February 2, 2025	Rodrigo Duterte June 30, 2016 – June 30, 2022
February 2, 2020	Michael Aguinaldo March 24, 2015 – February 2, 2022	Mario Lipana January 26, 2022 – present	Roland Pondoc February 6, 2018 – February 2, 2025	Rodrigo Duterte June 30, 2016 – June 30, 2022
February 2, 2022	Rizalina Justol February 17 – June 1, 2022 Jose Calida July 4 – October 4, 2022 Gamaliel Cordoba October 21, 2022 – November 13, 2026 Douglas Michael Mallillin November 16, 2026 - present	Mario Lipana January 26, 2022 – present	Roland Pondoc February 6, 2018 – February 2, 2025	Rodrigo Duterte June 30, 2016 – June 30, 2022
February 2, 2022	Rizalina Justol February 17 – June 1, 2022 Jose Calida July 4 – October 4, 2022 Gamaliel Cordoba October 21, 2022 – November 13, 2026 Douglas Michael Mallillin November 16, 2026 - present	Mario Lipana January 26, 2022 – present	Roland Pondoc February 6, 2018 – February 2, 2025	Bongbong Marcos June 30, 2022 – present
February 2, 2025	Rizalina Justol February 17 – June 1, 2022 Jose Calida July 4 – October 4, 2022 Gamaliel Cordoba October 21, 2022 – November 13, 2026 Douglas Michael Mallillin November 16, 2026 - present	Mario Lipana January 26, 2022 – present	Douglas Michael Mallillin February 10, 2025 – November 16, 2026	Bongbong Marcos June 30, 2022 – present
February 2, 2027	Rizalina Justol February 17 – June 1, 2022 Jose Calida July 4 – October 4, 2022 Gamaliel Cordoba October 21, 2022 – November 13, 2026 Douglas Michael Mallillin November 16, 2026 - present		Douglas Michael Mallillin February 10, 2025 – November 16, 2026	Bongbong Marcos June 30, 2022 – present

== Powers ==
In Jess Christoper S. Biong v. Commission on Audit, the Supreme Court ruled that the COA's audit power does not include the imposition of administrative penalties by its auditors upon culpable public officers.

== See also ==
- Supreme audit institution, similar offices in other countries
