= BusinessMirror =

Filipino broadsheet business newspaper

- A broader look at today's business

- Front page of the newspaper on October 13, 2014
- Type: Daily newspaper
- Format: Broadsheet
- Owner(s): Philippine Business Daily Mirror Publishing, Inc.
- Founder: Amb. Antonio Cabangon-Chua
- Publisher: T. Anthony C. Cabangon
- President: Benjamin V. Ramos
- Editor-in-chief: Lourdes M. Fernandez
- Associate editor: Jennifer A. Ng
- News editor: Vittorio V. Vitug
- Founded: October 3, 2005; 20 years ago (7,491 issues)
- Political alignment: Centre
- Language: English
- Headquarters: 3rd Floor, Dominga Building (Annex); 2113 Chino Roces Avenue cor De La Rosa St. Makati, Metro Manila, Philippines
- City: Manila
- Country: Philippines
- Circulation: 82,000 (2012)
- Sister newspapers: Pilipino Mirror
- ISSN: 1908-1189
- Website: www.businessmirror.com.ph

BusinessMirror is a daily business newspaper in the Philippines, founded in 2005 by Antonio Cabangon-Chua, who was also its publisher and the owner of radio network Aliw Broadcasting Corporation.

As of September 2011, BusinessMirror has a daily circulation of 82,000.

== ABS-CBN agreement ==
On April 30, 2014, BusinessMirror and ABS-CBN Integrated News and Current Affairs (consisting of ABS-CBN News Channel and its online affiliate, ABS-CBNnews.com) signed a content sharing/partnership agreement that will boost both entities to continue to deliver the credible business and economy news in the country.

Officers of BusinessMirror and ABS-CBN News, including its news chief, Regina Reyes, witnessed the agreement signing.
