= Antonio Cabangon-Chua =

Filipino businessman, ambassador and reserved colonel

Antonio L. Cabangon-Chua
- Born: Antonio Lim Cabangon-Chua; August 30, 1934; Philippines
- Died: March 11, 2016 (aged 81); Ozamiz, Misamis Occidental
- Resting place: San Felipe Neri Cemetery Mandaluyong, Metro Manila
- Other names: ALC, Amba
- Education: University of the East (Bachelor of Science in Business Administration, 1956); Adamson University (honoris causa)
- Occupations: philanthropist, businessman, diplomat
- Title: ALC Group of Companies founder and chairman emeritus
- Spouse: Bienvenida Angeles Chua
- Children: 16
- Parent(s): Tomas Chua (father); Dominga Lim Cabangon (mother)
- Website: antoniocabangonchua.com

Antonio L. Cabangon-Chua (August 30, 1934 – March 11, 2016) was a Filipino businessman, Philippine ambassador to Laos under the administration of former president Gloria Macapagal Arroyo, and reserved colonel of the Armed Forces of the Philippines, being an honorary member of Philippine Military Academy class of 1956. He graduated from the University of the East in the same year, with a Bachelor of Science in Business Administration degree.

He received a doctorate in the Humanities, honoris causa, from the Adamson University.

== Early life ==
Being called "Tony", Cabangon–Chua, born in 1934, was the only child of a Chinese lumber dealer, Tomas Chua, and a Filipino, Dominga Lim Cabangon (1910–1962). His mother would later be a philanthropist. The family once lived a middle class life at Leveriza Street, Malate, Manila, until their house was destroyed during the Second World War. His father was said executed by the Japanese in Fort Santiago in 1944.

His family experienced living in extreme poverty thereafter; they later lived at a rented room. At age eleven, he helped his mother, working then as a washerwoman, through doing odd jobs, among them being a shoeshiner in Mandaluyong—his hometown, mainly for the American soldiers at the time of the liberation of the Philippines, and selling magazines and pandesal. He managed as well to support his schooling until becoming a Certified Public Accountant (CPA).

Had a hobby of watching movies, he used to go to Bellevue Theater, which he later bought.

== Education ==
Cabangon–Chua spent primary education in Namayan, Mandaluyong (school later renamed Isaac Lopez Elementary School), and in Santa Ana, Manila; and secondary (until 1953) and tertiary (until 1956) at the University of the East. He gave up his dream of becoming a doctor as he pursued and finished a business administration degree a year shorter than the usual duration. He passed the CPA examination in 1960.

He also enrolled an engineering course at the Far East Asian Technological Institute (FEATI) at the time of his college years, as well as a law course at the Adamson University for two years until focusing on his pawnshop business; however, he did not finished both. He took vocational courses, among them automotive mechanic in FEATI and diesel mechanic at the Guzman Institute of Technology. He enrolled in a Dale Carnegie course in 1960.

== Career ==
Shortly after his graduation, Cabangon–Chua worked at an accounting firm. He then opened Filipinas Pawnshop in 1958. He worked on and eventually became one of the country's millionaires, and in 1974, he established a flagship company, ALC Commercial and Industrial Corporation.

His business interests include real estate, hotel, broadcasting, print media, banking and insurance. He founded Citystate Savings Bank, Fortune Life Insurance Co. Inc., Eternal Plans, Citystate Properties and Management Corp., and Isuzu GenCars, Inc.

"Ka Tony" Cabangon-Chua was also a tri-media magnate, having owned some business interests related to media, including newspaper BusinessMirror, tabloid Pilipino Mirror, magazines Philippine Graphic Weekly, View and Cook, and the radio network Aliw Broadcasting Corporation that operates AM radio station DWIZ and FM radio station Home Radio 97.9.

He was also the chairman of Nine Media Corporation, the media company behind CNN Philippines (now RPTV, in partnership with TV5 Network) and the state-owned Radio Philippines Network, as he acquired the 34% stake of RPN from Solar Entertainment Corporation in 2014 due to the Tieng's loss of revenue after investing on RPN. He was also the chairman and president of the Catholic Mass Media Awards Foundation, appointed by former Manila archbishop Cardinal Jaime Sin from 2000 until his death.

In October 2014, Cabangon–Chua led the successful negotiations between the TV network and CNN International, that paved way for the launch of CNN Philippines, a free-to-air TV news channel aired on RPN-9.

In 2015, the Kapisanan ng mga Brodkaster ng Pilipinas (KBP) awarded Cabangon-Chua with the Lifetime Achievement Award for his remarkable contributions in the broadcasting business as the founder and chairman emeritus of ABC.

On the same year, the Catholic Mass Media Awards confers the Special Award for Devoted Service to the Church through the Mass Media award to Cabangon-Chua.

=== Government career ===
- During the presidency of Gloria Macapagal-Arroyo, Cabangon–Chua served as the Philippine ambassador to Laos (January 2003–August 2004).

== Personal life and death ==
Cabangon-Chua was noted supporting literature, music and the arts, and helped journalists in need. He was a colonel in the Armed Forces of the Philippines' Reserve Force.

Cabangon–Chua died on March 11, 2016, at age 81. He was later buried at a cemetery in San Felipe Neri, Mandaluyong.

== Legacy ==
Cabangon–Chua established Dominga L. Cabangon Memorial Foundation in 1978, in honor of his mother, giving educational assistance; as well as Quijano de Manila Foundation more than three decades later, in honor of his friend and biographer, National Artist for Literature Nick Joaquin, helping aspirant writers.

His biography was written by Joaquin, who worked as a Philippine Graphic editor, entitled A Saga of Success, and was published by Brown Madonna Press in 1986. A sequel, No Dream Too Tall, was made by another Graphic editor and writer Jose Lacaba, and Eric Caruncho.
