= Douglas Michael Mallillin =

Acting Chairman of the Commission on Audit of the Philippines

Douglas Michael N. Mallillin
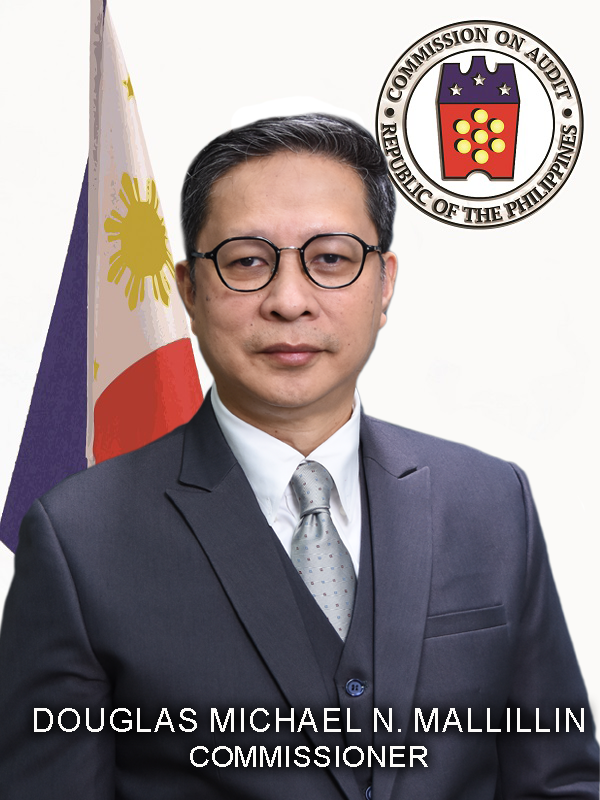

Chairman of the Commission on Audit
- Ad interim
- Assumed office November 16, 2026
- President: Bongbong Marcos
- Preceded by: Gamaliel Cordoba

Commissioner of the Commission on Audit
- In office February 10, 2025 – November 16, 2026
- Preceded by: Roland Café Pondoc
- Succeeded by: TBA

Personal details
- Profession: Lawyer, Certified Public Accountant

Douglas Michael N. Mallillin is a Filipino lawyer, public accountant, and government official serving as Chairman of the Commission on Audit (COA) since November 16, 2026. He was appointed by President Ferdinand R. Marcos Jr. as COA commissioner on February 10, 2025 - November 16, 2026, succeeding Roland Café Pondoc.

== Early life and education ==
Mallillin earned his Juris Doctor degree from Ateneo de Manila University, graduating with Second Honors, and obtained his Accountancy degree from Saint Louis University, graduating Magna cum laude. He passed the 1996 Bar Examinations with a rating of 88.00% and ranked first in the 1986 CPA Licensure Exam with a rating of 94.57%.

== Career ==
Prior to his appointment as COA Commissioner, Mallillin served as:

- Director IV under the Office of the Chairperson.
- Deputy Commissioner at the National Telecommunications Commission.
- Associate Prosecutor at the Department of Justice.
- Private legal practitioner at the Edgar M. Avila Law Office.

He has also been a professor in taxation, business law, accounting, and criminal law at St. Louis University and Tarlac State University.

Mallillin was appointed ad interim Commissioner of COA on February 10, 2025, by President Ferdinand R. Marcos Jr., following the end of Roland Café Pondoc’s term on February 2, 2025. His experience in auditing, finance, law, and information and communications technology (ICT) is expected to strengthen COA’s mandate of accountability, transparency, and integrity in government financial management.

== Controversy ==
Mallillin was flagged with bias for defending the Department of Finance (DOF) on its order to government owned and controlled corporations including the Philippine Health Insurance Corporation (PhilHealth) to remit money back to the National Treasury.
