= Karambola (radio program) =

Philippine political talk radio program

- Title card from 2021
- Genre: Talk radio
- Running time: 2 hrs. (including commercials)
- Country of origin: Philippines
- Languages: Tagalog, English
- Home station: DWIZ (2005-present)
- Syndicates: DWIZ News FM Regional (FM stations) (2018-2026); RPN Radyo Ronda (2014-present)
- Hosted by: Jonathan Dela Cruz (2005–present); Conrad Banal (2015–present); Joel Lacsamana (2022–present); (See also former hosts)
- Created by: Antonio Cabangon-Chua
- Original release: April 11, 2005 – present
- No. of episodes: n/a (airs daily)

Karambola (lit. 'Collision') is a Philippine political talk radio program. It airs every weekday mornings on DWIZ in Metro Manila, and nationwide via syndication on RPN Radyo Ronda.

Since 2018, the program has been live streaming through social media platforms such as Facebook and YouTube, as well on the station's official website and mobile application. on May 10, 2022, the program premiered on Aliw Broadcasting Corporation's newest television station IZTV (now Aliw 23), which is currently conducting test broadcasts.

== History ==
Title card from 2019-2020

The program was first conceptualized by Aliw Broadcasting Corporation founder and former Ambassador Antonio Cabangon-Chua, as a way to debate and tackle issues on politics, featuring a panel of prominent journalists and broadcasters.

In 2018, blogger RJ Nieto ("Thinking Pinoy") and lawyer Trixie Cruz-Angeles joined the show's third batch. Jojo Robles died on May 23, 2019. Senator Imee Marcos and attorney Larry Gadon joined as guest commentators in 2019, while Nieto left the program on August 3, 2020.

Angeles left the program in May 2022 to pursue her role as Secretary of the Presidential Communications Operations Office. Willie Jurado (former chief adviser of Bongbong Marcos), Joel Lacsamana (Manila Standard columnist), and Anna Mae Lamentillo (Manila Bulletin columnist and former chairperson of the Build Build Build committee of the Department of Public Works and Highways) were named as new co-hosts following Cruz-Angeles' departure.

On October 20, 2022, Cruz-Angeles returned to her role as co-host and moderator of the said program, following her departure from the Office of the Press Secretary earlier in the month.

== Hosts ==
=== Current hosts ===
- Jonathan Dela Cruz (2005–present)
- Conrad Banal (2015–present)
- Joel Lacsamana (2022–present)

=== Former hosts ===
- Trixie Cruz-Angeles (2018–22; 2022–24)
- Willie Jurado (2022–24)
- Alvin Capino†
- Teodoro Locsin Jr.
- Jesus Crispin “Boying” Remulla
- Dodo Dulay
- Dong Puno†
- Imee Marcos
- Larry Gadon (2019–2026)
- Ed Javier
- Cely Ortega Bueno
- Cielo Villaluna
- Alex Magno
- Salvador Escudero†
- Tonton Contreras
- Jojo Robles†
- RJ Nieto
- Anna Mae Yu Lamentillo

== See also ==
- DWIZ
