= Gamaliel Cordoba =

Associate Justice of the Supreme Court of the Philippines since 2026

- Official portrait, 2026

Associate Justice of the Supreme Court of the Philippines
- Incumbent
- Assumed office November 16, 2026
- Appointed by: Bongbong Marcos
- Preceded by: Amy Lazaro-Javier

Chairman of the Commission on Audit
- In office October 21, 2022 – November 13, 2026
- Preceded by: Jose Calida
- Succeeded by: Douglas Michael Mallillin (ad interim)

Commissioner of the National Telecommunications Commission
- In office August 1, 2009 – October 20, 2022
- President: Gloria Macapagal Arroyo; Benigno Aquino III; Rodrigo Duterte; Bongbong Marcos
- Preceded by: Ruel V. Canobas
- Succeeded by: Ella Bianca B. Lopez

Personal details
- Born: Gamaliel Asis Cordoba
- Education: Ateneo De Manila University (BA, JD)
- Profession: Lawyer

Gamaliel Asis Cordoba is a Filipino lawyer and a government official who is an associate justice of the Supreme Court of the Philippines since 2026. He was a former Chairperson of the Commission on Audit from 2022 to 2026, and also the longest-serving Commissioner of the National Telecommunications Commission (NTC) from 2009 until 2022.

Cordoba also served as External Auditor of the International Labour Organization.

Cordoba was one of the key figures in the 2020 shutdown of ABS-CBN and the denial of its franchise renewal, as well as the 2022 termination of ABS-CBN and TV5's partnership deal.

The Supreme Court upheld the decision to terminate ABS-CBN's franchise with the en banc unanimously voting to junk the petition questioning the NTC's cease and desist order, saying it is "moot and academic" because Congress has denied the network's franchise renewal.

== Education and early career ==
Cordoba took up Economics at the Ateneo De Manila University and obtained his Bachelor's degree in economics in 1992. He subsequently entered the Ateneo de Manila Law School and obtained his Juris Doctor degree in 1996.

While in law school, Cordoba joined the Fraternal Order of Utopia. After passing the Bar in 1997, he joined the Siguion Reyna, Montecillo & Ongsiako Law Offices. Justice Cordoba also worked as a tax lawyer at SyCip GorresVelayo & Co.

== Government service ==
Cordoba joined the government in 2001. He served for nearly a decade at the Office of the President, beginning with a stint as a Director at the Office of the Presidential Chief of Staff, followed by his appointment in 2002 as Assistant Executive Secretary. Cordoba was later promoted to Undersecretary in 2003 and served as Appointments Secretary of President Gloria M. Arroyo from 2006 to 2007. From 2008 to 2009, he would also serve as part of the Board of Directors of the Philippine Amusement and Gaming Corporation.

He also represented the Office of the President as Director of the Philippine National Railways, Director of the Maritime Industry Authority, Member of the Presidential Committee on Good Governance, and Execom Member of the Technology and Livelihood Resource Center.

== Supreme Court Associate Justice ==
Cordoba was appointed as Supreme Court associate justice by President Ferdinand Marcos, Jr. on November 13, 2026. He replaced retired Associate Justice Amy Lazaro-Javier.

Cordoba is the 196th member of the High Tribunal. He joined the Supreme Court after more than two decades of public service.

== National Telecommunications Commission Commissioner ==
In 2009, Cordoba was appointed Commissioner of the National Telecommunications Commission (NTC) by then President Gloria Macapagal Arroyo.

He was later appointed to the same position by her successor, President Benigno S. Aquino III, as well as President Rodrigo Duterte and President Bongbong Marcos. By the time he left the NTC in 2022, Cordoba held the distinction of being the commission's longest-serving head.

=== Filtering Child Pornography ===
As NTC head, in 2015 Cordoba issued guidelines to filter online child pornography and block access to such websites.

=== Breaking Duopoly ===
During his tenure, the NTC broke the long-time duopoly in the telecommunications industry by selecting a third telco through a transparent bidding process under the guidance of the International Telecommunication Union.

=== Adopting Japanese TV Broadcast System ===
Cordoba adopted the Japanese Digital Terrestrial Television Broadcast System as the Philippine Digital TV Platform as head of NTC.

=== Exceeding Target Revenue ===
In 2022, the NTC exceeded its target for 2021 by P3.82 billion, or 72.4% over its goal.

=== Free Calls for Typhoon Victims ===
In the wake of typhoon "Rolly" in 2020, Cordoba spearheaded the “Libreng Tawag” program as head of NTC to ensure help is available all the time, and rehabilitation and recovery efforts are on time.

In a memorandum signed by Cordoba, he again ordered all public telcos to provide free call and charging stations in areas affected by the 7.0 earthquake in Abra in 2022.

=== Increasing Download Speeds ===
During Cordoba's term as NTC chief, download speeds on fixed broadband in the Philippines increased from 7.91 Mbit/s in July 2016 to 26.08 Mbit/s in September 2020. Meanwhile, download speeds on mobile connections increased from 7.44 Mbit/s in July 2016 to 16.89 Mbit/s in September 2020, representing a 127.06% increase.

While these numbers still fell short of the global standard at the time, the country's fixed broadband speed has now improved to 90.57 Mbit/s, building on Cordoba's instituted reforms.

=== Fastest Regulatory Approval for Starlink ===
Under Cordoba's term as NTC Chief, Elon Musk’s Space Exploration Technologies Corp.’s low earth orbit (LEO) satellite internet technology, Starlink, got the approval to construct and operate telecommunications value-added service facilities in the Philippines. The approval of Starlink was given in record time: 30 minutes following the filing of application papers.

Cordoba said that the roll-out of Starlink's internet access services will benefit immensely unserved or underserved areas in the country, and have direct access to the world, bypassing local service providers.

=== ABS-CBN ===
During his term, the telecoms regulator issued a cease-and-desist order against ABS-CBN after its legislative franchise expired on May 5, 2020.

Members of the House Committee on Legislative Franchise on July 10, in a vote of 70-11, rejected the broadcast network’s bid for a fresh franchise, which became the basis of a Supreme Court decision on August 25 to uphold NTC’s cease order.

== ASEANSAI Chairmanship ==
At the 7th ASEAN Supreme Audit Institutions (SAI) Summit held in Manila on November 2, 2023, Cordoba was named as the group's Chairman for the years 2024-2025.

The Philippines hosted the summit, which was attended by 68 delegates from the different SAIs of Cambodia, Indonesia, Brunei Darussalam, Singapore, Thailand, Lao People's Democratic Republic, Malaysia, Myanmar, and Vietnam.

It was also the first ASEANSAI Summit held in person after the pandemic.

== Chairmanship of INTOSAI Working Group on Public Debt ==
From May 8 to 10, 2023, Cordoba presided over the International Organization of Supreme Audit Institutions (INTOSAI) Working Group on Public Debt (WGPD) Annual Meeting in Cairo, Egypt.

Cordoba led the Philippines’ Commission on Audit (COA) which acted as the Secretariat to the Working Group in the 2023 Cairo WGPD Annual Meeting.

The WGPD discussed better transparency and accountability in public debt management.

Cordoba and COA chaired the annual meeting of the INTOSAI WGPD in Baku, Azerbaijan from June 5 to 7, 2024. The event, which included delegates from 28 member Supreme Audit Institutions and experts from international organizations, focused on "Responding to the Global Challenges of Public Debt" and highlighted the importance of knowledge-sharing and collaboration on issues such as risk management, debt sustainability, and green financing.

== External Auditor for ILO ==
COA began auditing the International Labour Organization (ILO) in 2015 and the United Nations Industrial Development Organization (UNIDO) in 2019, with audits conducted twice a year.

Chairperson Cordoba served as External Auditor of the International Labour Organization in 2022 and 2023. He presented COA's comprehensive audit report for the year ending December 31, 2023, to the governing body of the ILO. This presentation took place at the 112th Session of the International Labour Conference and included consolidated financial statements.

== ASOSAI Governing Board ==
COA was elected to the Governing Board of the Asian Organization of Supreme Audit Institutions (ASOSAI) during its 16th Assembly in New Delhi, India. The assembly, which brought together representatives from Supreme Audit Institutions (SAIs) across Asia, focused on addressing important audit issues and guiding the organization's future direction.

COA's election to the Governing Board was a significant achievement for the Philippines, furthering Chairperson Gamaliel Cordoba's commitment to international auditing standards and fostering collaboration among SAIs. Other countries elected alongside the Philippines include Azerbaijan, Kazakhstan, Korea, Malaysia, Pakistan, and the United Arab Emirates.

== Pioneer in Gender and Development Funds Audit ==
COA hosted a high-level delegation from the Royal Government of Cambodia on October 8, 2024, sharing its experiences in auditing Gender and Development (GAD) Funds. This visit, organized by the United Nations Development Programme, aimed to enhance the capacity of Cambodian policymakers in promoting gender-responsive budgeting (GRB) and women's leadership.

COA Chairperson Gamaliel Cordoba welcomed the 32 delegates, led by Her Excellency Dr. Ing Kantha Phavi, Minister of the Ministry of Women's Affairs of Cambodia. He emphasized the importance of the discussions in providing practical insights that could benefit Cambodia's GRB initiatives.

COA is internationally recognized as "a pioneer in auditing GAD Funds", while updating its guidelines and promoting the development of its personnel in this area.

== Collaborating with World Bank on Enhancing Accountability ==
COA Chairperson Gamaliel Cordoba and other officials met with World Bank senior financial management specialists, led by Patrick Piker Umah Tete to strengthen their collaboration on enhancing accountability processes in government.

The World Bank commended COA's exemplary audit performance, recognizing its global leadership as a Supreme Audit Institution, especially through the innovative Citizen Participatory Audit (CPA) program. The World Bank now aims to re-engage with COA to assess the progress of the CPA since its institutionalization and its effectiveness in mitigating risk exposure and enhancing accountability.

The World Bank and COA will collaborate to enhance audits of World Bank-funded projects, strengthen internal audit functions across government, and advance other accounting and auditing reforms outlined in the Public Financial Management Reform Roadmap.

== Strengthening the Audit of Foreign-Assisted Projects with ADB ==
The Commission on Audit (COA) of the Philippines, led by Chairperson Gamaliel Cordoba, met with the Asian Development Bank (ADB) on November 20, 2024, to discuss initiatives to strengthen audits of foreign-assisted projects, public debt, and Public Financial Management (PFM) reforms. This collaboration aligns with COA's international commitments, including the PFM Inter-agency Initiative for Green Lane Fiduciary Arrangements.

Chairperson Cordoba was joined by COA officials and supervising auditors overseeing various government departments and agencies, while ADB's delegation included key leaders and specialists in public financial management and project operations. ADB emphasized the importance of COA's role in ensuring effective financial oversight, particularly as ADB's Philippine project portfolio is expected to grow significantly in the coming years.

== COA's Senior Executive Development Program (SEDP) ==
The Commission on Audit (COA) conducted the graduation ceremony for 20 officials who successfully completed the Senior Executive Development Program (SEDP). The SEDP is designed to enhance the leadership skills and competencies of COA's senior executives, ensuring the development of capable and competitive leaders within the organization.

The program aligns with COA Resolution No. 2002-009, which mandates the continuous professional development of the agency's senior executives. The event was led by COA Chairperson Gamaliel A. Cordoba, who recognized the achievements of the program's graduates.

== COA Earns Independent Review Statement for Meeting International Audit Standards ==
The Commission on Audit (COA) has successfully passed an international standards assessment of its methodologies, earning an Independent Review Statement. This achievement follows COA's completion of a repeat self-assessment against global auditing benchmarks through the submission of its Supreme Audit Institutions (SAI) Performance Report to the International Organization of Supreme Audit Institutions (INTOSAI) Development Initiative (IDI). The Independent Review Statement, issued by an IDI-designated reviewer, confirms COA's adherence to international best practices and reinforces its commitment to transparency and accountability.

== SAI Philippines and the 2025 INTOSAI Working Group on Public Debt Meeting ==
The Supreme Audit Institution (SAI) of the Philippines, through the Commission on Audit (COA), led the 2025 Annual Meeting of the INTOSAI Working Group on Public Debt (WGPD) held in Bucharest, Romania. Chaired by COA Chairperson Gamaliel A. Cordoba, the hybrid meeting focused on global trends in public debt management and the evolving role of SAIs. Delegates from over 20 countries, including the U.S., China, Brazil, and India, participated alongside experts from the International Monetary Fund (IMF).

== COA named WTO External Auditor ==
In April 2026, COA was appointed as the new External Auditor of the World Trade Organization (WTO). It's a non-renewable six-year term succeeding France's Cour Des Comptes. Its role includes overseeing the audit of WTO's financial statements, pension plan, and operations in line with WTO's financial regulations.

WTO's Committee on Budget, Finance and Administration (CBFA) said that COA has a proven track record in auditing international organizations, and it will help WTO in reinforcing its financial accountability.

== Fraud audit of Bulacan flood control projects ==
In August 2025, Commission on Audit (COA) Chairman Gamaliel Cordoba ordered a fraud audit of flood control projects in Bulacan, citing concerns raised through President Bongbong Marcos's “Sumbong sa Pangulo” initiative. The audit, which covers projects implemented by the Department of Public Works and Highways (DPWH), was prompted by reports of anomalies in the province, which accounted for 45 percent of the ₱548 billion worth of flood control projects in Central Luzon since 2022.

Cordoba directed the Technical Services Office to “designate technical personnel for the immediate conduct of technical inspections of all ongoing and completed flood control projects” in Bulacan from January 1, 2022, to July 31, 2025". He directed that priority be given to high-value contracts and verify the physical existence, progress, and compliance of projects through site inspections, geo-tagged photos, and videos.

In line with this, Cordoba has ordered a performance audit of the Flood Management Masterplan for Metro Manila and Surrounding Areas Project (FRMRP), included in the 2024–2026 Performance Audit Portfolio through Resolution No. 2024-018. Implemented by the DPWH with World Bank support, the program covers flood-prone areas in Metro Manila, Bulacan, Rizal, Pampanga, and Cavite through both structural works and community-based measures. COA said the review, aligned with national and global development goals, will assess the project's effectiveness and impact amid rising public concerns.

In September 2025, at least three government contractors and several Bulacan district engineers were recommended for charges before the Office of the Ombudsman in connection with alleged “ghost” or substandard flood control projects. COA Chairman Gamaliel Cordoba and Department of Public Works and Highways (DPWH) Secretary Vince Dizon endorsed the filing of cases against Wawao Builders, St. Timothy Construction Corporation (owned by the Discaya family), and Syms Construction Trading. Also included in the complaints were former Bulacan First District Engineer Henry Alcantara, Assistant District Engineer Brice Hernandez, Project Engineer Paul Duya, and Construction Section Chief Jaypee Mendoza. The move followed testimonies at a Senate hearing where contractors Sarah and Curlee Discaya claimed they were pressured by corrupt officials to participate in rigged biddings and surrender portions of project funds in exchange for contracts.

According to documents submitted by COA and DPWH, around ₱341 million worth of projects handled by the three contractors were found to be either substandard, overpriced, or entirely non-existent. Among these were five projects identified in Bulacan, including incomplete or misrepresented works in Calumpit and Baliuag, discrepancies in pricing amounting to ₱38.4 million in a rehabilitation project in Bulusan, and overpayments in Plaridel. Notably, COA inspectors reported that a ₱55 million reinforced concrete river wall in Baliuag, supposedly implemented by Syms Construction, had no construction present on site.

On September 18, 2025, COA submitted another set of fraud audit reports to the Ombudsman, identifying four additional “ghost” flood control projects in Plaridel, Pandi, and Bocaue worth over ₱389 million. The projects, awarded to Wawao Builders and TopNotch Catalyst Builders Inc., were found to be non-existent or overlapping with pre-existing structures. COA held several DPWH officials and contractor representatives liable and said more individuals may be charged as the audit progresses.

In its second batch of fraud audit reports to the Independent Commission for Infrastructure (ICI) in October, COA uncovered four more multimillion-peso flood control projects in Bulacan that were fully paid for but never built, filing charges against Department of Public Works and Highways (DPWH) officials and contractors involved. The projects under the DPWH Bulacan 1st District Engineering Office were found to be missing, built elsewhere with substandard structures, or lacking required documents. These include two ₱92.7-million flood control structures in Baliuag and Pulilan awarded to SYMS Construction Trading, a ₱69.5-million riverbank protection project in Plaridel by Topnotch Catalyst Builders, and a ₱96.5-million riverwall in Baliuag by Triple 8 Construction. DPWH officials and contractors—including Sally N. Santos, Eumir S. Villanueva, and Wilfredo M. Natividad—along with company officers, may face charges for graft, malversation, falsification, and violations of procurement and auditing rules.

On October 10, 2025, COA informed the Independent Commission for Infrastructure (ICI) that it had uncovered additional fraudulent flood-control projects in Bulacan under the Department of Public Works and Highways (DPWH). The COA report implicated the DPWH Bulacan 1st District Engineering Office (DEO) and three contractors—M3 Konstract Corporation, SYMS Construction and Trading, and Amethyst Horizon Builders and General Contractor and Development Corporation—in a series of alleged “ghost projects.” One project, the Construction of Riverbank Protection Structure at Barangay San Roque, Baliuag, Bulacan worth ₱96.5 million, was found in a different location from that approved, with defective structures and conflicting documentation on costs and contractors. COA has filed four fraud audit reports with the Independent Commission for Infrastructure (ICI), implicating officials of the Department of Public Works and Highways (DPWH) and several contractors in these alleged irregularities surrounding four flood-control projects in Bulacan worth ₱359 million.

On October 24, 2025, COA filed four fraud audit reports with the Independent Commission for Infrastructure (ICI), flagging ₱309 million worth of flood-control projects in Bulacan as “ghost” or mismatched due to construction in unapproved sites and the use of substandard materials. The projects—implemented by SYMS Construction Trading, L.R. Tiqui Builders Inc. and M3 Konstract Corporation (joint venture), and Darcy & Anna Builders & Trading—included riverbank and flood-control structures in Balagtas, Bulakan, Baliuag, and Hagonoy that were either built in locations different from those approved, found with exposed steel bars, or made with unsuitable materials, despite contractors being paid in full.

In November 2025, the Commission on Audit (COA) flagged four flood control projects in Bulacan worth over ₱344 million for what it described as “systemic irregularities,” including ghost structures, falsified completion reports, and project sites that did not match official plans. The COA said its Fraud Audit Office submitted four Fraud Audit Reports (FARs) to the Independent Commission for Infrastructure (ICI), covering projects under the Department of Public Works and Highways (DPWH) Bulacan 1st District Engineering Office. The flagged projects were awarded to SYMS Construction Trading, M3 Konstract Corporation, Elite General Contractor & Development Corporation, and Wawao Builders. Investigators found that one project was built in a different location from what was approved, two others were redundant as they duplicated existing structures, and one project did not exist at all despite being marked as “100 percent complete.”

The COA identified several former DPWH officials and private contractors who may face administrative and criminal charges for violations of the Anti-Graft and Corrupt Practices Act (Republic Act No. 3019), malversation of public funds, falsification of documents under the Revised Penal Code, and COA Circular No. 2009-001. Among those implicated were former Bulacan 1st District Engineer Henry C. Alcantara, Assistant District Engineer Brice Ericson D. Hernandez, and other section chiefs and engineers, alongside officers of the involved contractors. The COA said the four Bulacan projects form part of a broader anti-corruption effort, noting that it has so far filed 29 Fraud Audit Reports, nine of which have been referred to the Office of the Ombudsman and 12—including these four—to the ICI for further investigation and prosecution.

In November 2025, COA filed four more new Fraud Audit Reports (FARs) with the Independent Commission for Infrastructure (ICI), targeting four flood-control projects in Bulacan with a combined value of ₱297 million. These projects, implemented by the Department of Public Works and Highways (DPWH) — Bulacan 1st District Engineering Office and awarded to contractors Wawao Builders and SYMS Construction and Trading, were found to exhibit “serious and recurring signs of misuse of public funds.” .

According to the ABS-CBN report, the four FARs cover flood-control projects in Bulacan, and were submitted after COA reviews exposed serious and recurring signs of misuse of public funds in works awarded to private contractors despite claims of project completion.

In December 2025, the Commission on Audit (COA) flagged four flood control projects in Bulacan with a combined value of around ₱330.5 million after its fraud audit uncovered “ghost” structures and other irregularities in the implementation of contracts awarded to Wawao Builders by the Department of Public Works and Highways (DPWH). According to COA, the projects either lacked physical structures at their approved locations or had evidence of falsified completion reports despite being fully paid.

In a statement, the Commission on Audit (COA) disclosed that it recently forwarded four fraud audit reports (FARs) to the Independent Commission for Infrastructure, detailing DPWH Bulacan 1st District Engineering Office projects amounting to ₱330,512,956.97.

COA Chairman Gamaliel Cordoba announced a series of reforms to strengthen transparency and accountability within the agency following recent anomalies in flood-control projects, saying at a Senate finance committee hearing on October 14 that the COA is investigating its own personnel for possible negligence or complicity, with findings to be submitted to the agency's internal affairs office for possible sanctions. He emphasized that accountability would be enforced “at every layer,” and that officials and employees will now be required to declare any personal or financial interests related to their work. Cordoba also ordered the periodic reassignment of resident auditors and directed fraud auditors to conduct surprise inspections to ensure proper oversight. To further prevent falsification, COA will soon require geotagging for all infrastructure projects, including those outside the Department of Public Works and Highways (DPWH). The agency is also reviewing the reintroduction of pre-audit procedures for government offices with weak internal controls.

In December 2025, COA announced the finalization of a new policy requiring mandatory GPS-based geotagging for all government infrastructure projects, including those implemented by national agencies, local government units, and government-owned and controlled corporations. Under this policy, contractors and implementing agencies must submit geotagged photographs at each stage of a project (and during the warranty period), with exact GPS coordinates, date, and time. No payment or declaration of project completion will be processed unless the geotagged documentation is verified by COA teams.

The reform is part of a broader push to stamp out so-called “ghost projects” and falsified billings that have plagued public infrastructure spending. With this renewed, stricter geotagging, Cordoba expects to enhance transparency and accountability in public spending, with hopes that it will prevent further misuse of funds and strengthen pre-payment verification.

In January 2026, the Commission on Audit (COA) filed four fraud audit reports (FARs) involving over ₱325 million in anomalous flood control projects in Bulacan. The projects, implemented by the Department of Public Works and Highways (DPWH) Bulacan 1st District Engineering Office, were awarded to contractors Wawao Builders and Darcy and Anna Builders & Trading. State auditors utilized drone surveillance, geotagged photography, and historical satellite imagery to uncover a systemic misuse of public funds, identifying "ghost projects" that did not exist at their approved sites and instances where the government paid for structures that had already been built years before the contracts were even signed.

Specific irregularities were found in projects across Guiguinto, Hagonoy, Calumpit, and Malolos City, where COA noted unauthorized relocations of riverbank protection structures and severe documentation gaps, including missing as-built plans and geotechnical reports. As a result of these findings, the COA referred the cases to the Independent Commission for Infrastructure (ICI) for further investigation. Several DPWH officials and contractor representatives face potential charges for graft, corruption, malversation of public funds, and falsification of documents under the Revised Penal Code and the Anti-Graft and Corrupt Practices Act.

== Awards and recognitions ==
=== Presidential Medal of Merit ===
In 2010, Cordoba was awarded the Presidential Medal of Merit by President Gloria M. Arroyo for his exemplary performance and service delivery to the Filipino people. He also received the Radio Award from the Ministry of International Affairs and Communications of Japan.

On July 19, 2023, he was conferred with “The Order of the Rising Sun, Gold Rays with Neck Ribbon” by the Government of Japan in recognition of his contribution to the cooperation of both countries in the areas of information and technology. Japanese Ambassador Kazuhiko Koshikawa, on behalf of His Majesty the Emperor of Japan, gave Cordoba the award for his pivotal role in adopting ISDB-T [1] in the Philippines. ISDB-T is a terrestrial digital television-broadcasting standard devised by Japan.

The awarding ceremony was witnessed by First Lady Louise Araneta-Marcos, former president and current House Deputy Speaker Gloria Macapagal-Arroyo and former First Gentleman Jose Miguel Arroyo, House Speaker Ferdinand Martin Romualdez, Chief Justice Alexander Gesmundo, Executive Secretary Lucas Bersamin, Senate Majority Floor Leader Joel Villanueva, House Majority Leader Manuel Jose Dalipe, and NTC Commissioner Ella Lopez, along with close family and friends.

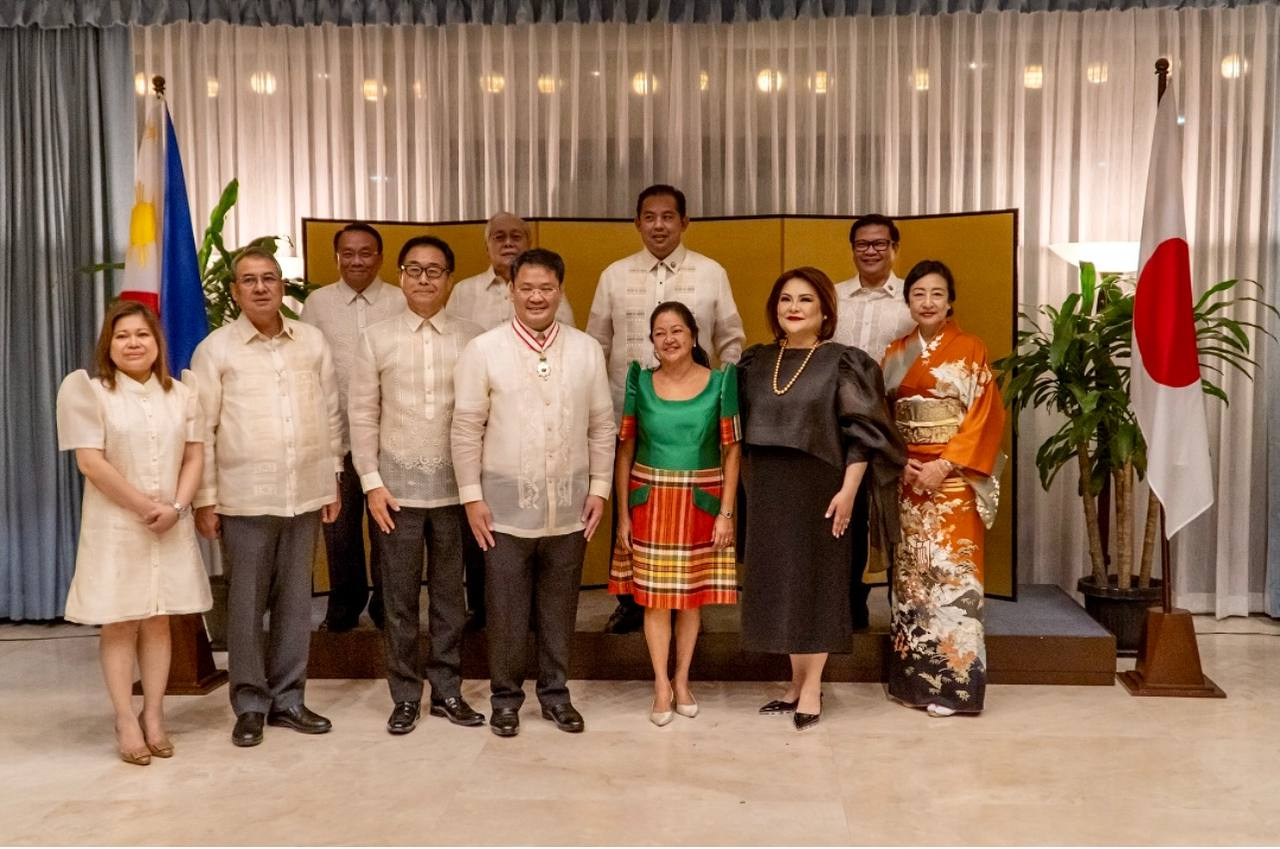
Former NTC commissioner and now chair of the Commission on Audit (COA) Gamaliel A. Cordoba is joined by First Lady Liza Araneta-Marcos and other government officials after he received the Order of the Rising Sun, Gold Rays with Neck Ribbon from the Japanese government on July 19, 2023, in a ceremony at the Japanese ambassador's residence.

=== Gawad Gat Andres Bonifacio Award 2026 ===
The City Government of Manila conferred upon Cordoba the Gawad Gat Andres Bonifacio Award during the Gawad Manileño 2026 held on June 18th at the Manila Metropolitan Theater. It was the highest honor given that night, acknowledging Cordoba's excellence in public service.

In his speech, Cordoba paid tribute to teachers and fellow Manileños in shaping his career in government as a public servant.
