= Maria Gracia Pulido Tan =

Filipino politician

Independent Audit Advisory Committee of the United Nations
- In office 2014–2019

Chair of the Philippine Commission on Audit
- In office April 5, 2011 – February 2, 2015

Undersecretary of the Revenue Operations Group in the Department of Finance (Philippines)
- In office 2003 – February 15, 2005

Commissioner, Presidential Commission on Good Government
- In office 2002–2003

Personal details
- Born: Maria Gracia M. Pulido
- Citizenship: Philippines
- Education: University of the Philippines Diliman, B.S. 1977 University of the Philippines College of Law, LL.B. 1981 New York University School of Law, LL.M. 1987
- Occupation: Accountant and lawyer
- Nickname: Grace

Maria Gracia M. Pulido Tan, also known as Grace Pulido Tan, is a Filipino politician, accountant, and lawyer. She served as the chairperson of the Philippine Commission on Audit and the undersecretary of the Department of Finance (Philippines). Tan was a member and chair of the Independent Audit Advisory Committee (IAAC) of the United Nations.

== Early life ==
Tan attended the University of the Philippines Diliman, graduating with a B.S. in business administration and accountancy in 1977. She received a Bachelor of Laws from the University of the Philippines College of Law in 1981. While an undergraduate, she joined the Eta chapter of Alpha Phi Omega.

She then was a Gerald Wallace Scholar at the New York University School of Law, graduating with a Masters of Law in Taxation in 1987.

== Career ==
Tan is a certified public accountant and lawyer who is a member of the Philippine Bar. From 1982 to 1986, she was an associate with Sycip Salazar Feliciano & Hernandez in Makati City. In 1987, she worked as a tax specialist for KPMG Peat Marwick Main & Co. in New York City, New York.

In 1998, she co-founded the Tan & Federis Law Offices in Pasig City, where she specialized in tax law. The firm became Tan & Venturanza Law Offices in 1992, and Tan Venturanza Valdez in 1996. Tan was the president of the Tax Management Association of the Philippines (TMAP) from 1997 to 1998. In 2001, she began teaching at the University of the Philippines College of Law. She also wrote the "Qualified Opinion" column in the Manila Bulletin.

Tan left her law practice to join the Presidential Commission on Good Government from 2002 to 2003. She served as Undersecretary of the Revenue Operations Group in the Department of Finance (Philippines), from 2003 to February 15, 2005. She then became an international consultant in tax reform and administration, working again in the private sector.

On April 5, 2011, she became the chairperson of the Philippine Commission on Audit. She was appointed by President Benigno Aquino III and was the first woman to hold this government position. In this capacity, she created the Citizen's Participatory Audit and the Fraud Audits Office. She retired from the commission on February 2, 2015. She was nominated for a seat of the Supreme Court of the Philippines, but was not selected.

Tan was one of five members of the Independent Audit Advisory Committee (IAAC) of the United Nations from 2014 to 2019, serving as its chair from 2017 to 2018. She is an external auditor for the World Health Organization and the Food and Agriculture Organization. She is also a consultant with the Asian Development Bank in the Philippines and the World Bank in Washington, D.C.

== Honors ==
In 2011, the University of the Philippines College of Business Administration presented Tan with its Distinguished Alumna Award. Her program, the Citizen's Participatory Audit, won the Bright Spots Award at the London Open Government Partnership Summit in November 2013. In 2015, the Philippine Daily Inquirer named her Filipino of the Year.

== Personal life ==
Tan is married to A. Bayani K. Tan, an attorney partner in the Tan Venturanza Valdez. They have five children. In 2012, The Philippine Star announced that Tan had a total networth of P64.118 million.
