= Citystate Savings Bank =

Bank in the Philippines

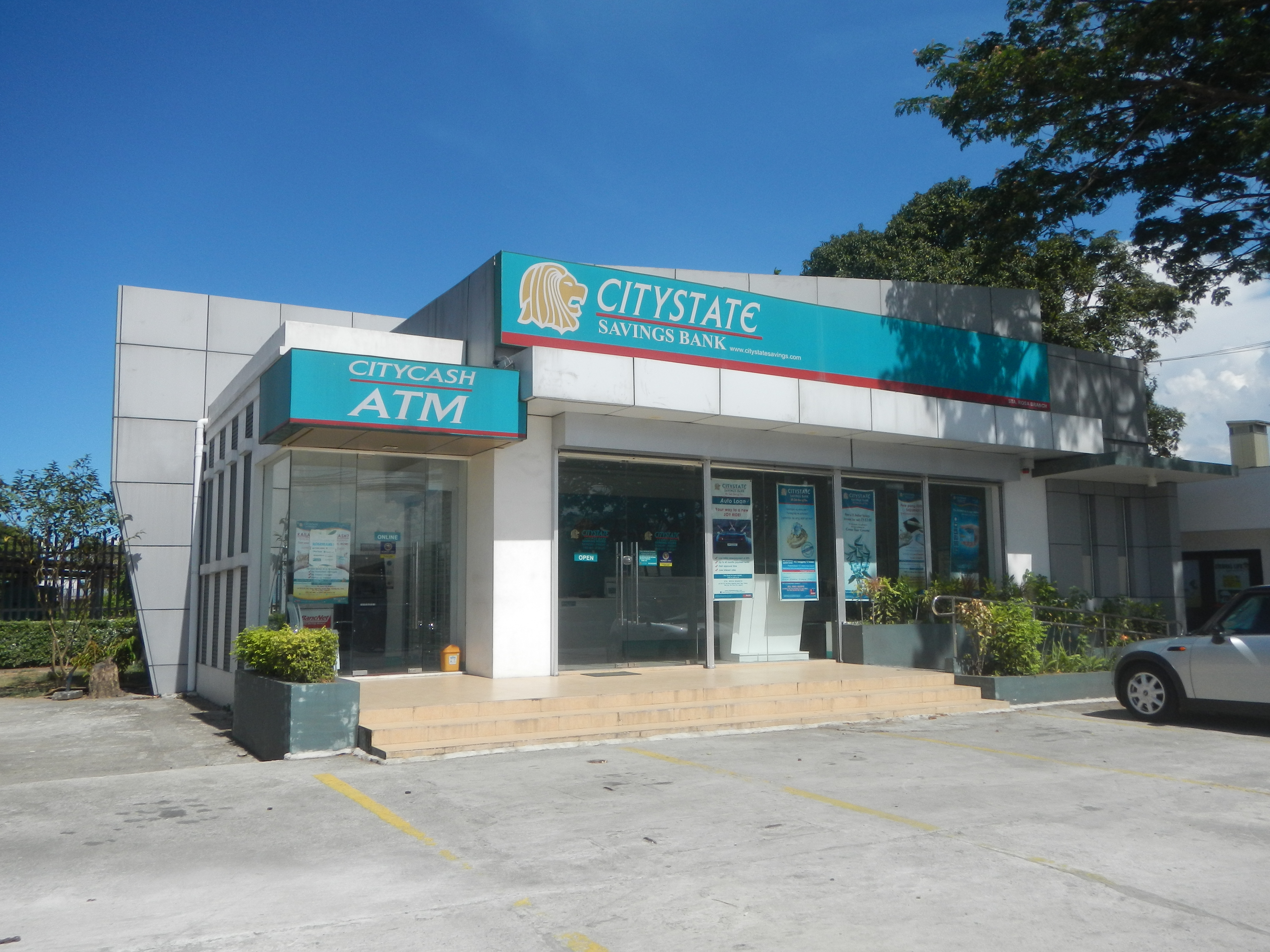
- A Citystate Savings Bank branch in Santa Rosa, Laguna
- Type: Public
- Traded as: PSE: CSB
- Industry: Financial services and Insurance
- Founded: August 7, 1997; 29 years ago
- Headquarters: Pasig (Citystate Centre), Philippines
- Number of locations: 24 branches
- Key people: D. Alfred A. Cabangon (Chairman); Alfonso G. Siy (Vice Chairman); Benjamin V. Ramos (President and CEO)
- Products: Retail banking, Commercial banking, Insurance
- Number of employees: 276 (2009)
- Parent: ALC Group of Companies
- Website: www.citystatesavings.com

Citystate Savings Bank or CSBank is a Filipino publicly listed thrift bank listed on the Philippine Stock Exchange. The bank was a partnership between a group of Filipino businessmen led by Ambassador Antonio Cabangon Chua and a Singaporean investment holding company. It was granted the thrift bank license by the Monetary Board of Bangko Sentral ng Pilipinas in 1997. It is part of the ALC Group of Companies owned by the Cabangon family.

CSBank offers banking services, such as deposit products and services, cash management, onsite/offsite ATM facilities, corporate and retail banking, and treasury services. The bank caters to the needs of corporate, middle market and retail clients.

As of 2009, the bank operated 24 branches nationwide and employed 276 employees. As of December 27, 2010, Citystate has a total market capitalization of ₱2.03 billion and a share price of ₱28.00. (to be updated for 2024).

== History ==
CSBank started its banking operations on August 7, 1997, a day after the Monetary Board of Bangko Sentral ng Pilipinas approved its thrift bank license. On January 2, 2002, the company Went public and was formally listed in the Philippines Stock Exchange under the stock symbol CSB.

To sustain its expansion by setting up more branches and developing new products and enhanced services, the bank ventured into a stock rights offering of 22 million, increasing its capitalization to ₱670 million from ₱450 million.

In November 2006, CSBank obtained its Trust and Foreign Currency Deposit license from the Bangko Sentral ng Pilipinas to accept dollar and other foreign currency-denominated deposits and manage funds, securities, and properties.

CSBank had grown to 30 branches when it celebrated its 25th Anniversary in August 2022. Since 2020, new professionals have joined the bank to embark on the bank's transformation. In 2023, CSBank opened 4 additional Branch Lite Units increasing its network to 34 branches. It has been improving its products and services and plans to launch a digital banking platform (subject to BSP approval) to enhance the delivery of services and customer experience. The Bank continues to focus on helping the Filipino middle market with its financial requirements including small business loans, consumer loans, and a host of deposit products. It has also engaged with partners to improve its cash management services.

== Products and services ==
For its credit and financing business, CSBank accepts jewelry for instant cash loans. Its lending business services commercial loans, real estate and development loans, auto-financing, salary loans, and agricultural loans.

CSBank is also included in the list of Government Securities Eligible Dealers (GSEDs) and is allowed to participate in the electronic auction of government securities through the Automated Debt Auction Processing System (ADAPS).

The Bank also operates foreign currency deposits and performs trust and fiduciary business.

== Financial highlights ==
As of 2010, City State incurred a net loss of ₱3.713 million. It was lower by ₱8.510 million from a year prior. Accumulated net loss after three quarters amounted to ₱8.24 million as compared to the previous year’s income of ₱6.33 million. This resulted from the required loan loss reserves as directed by BSP.

Total resources after three quarters netted a loss of ₱145 million from ₱2.50 billion to ₱2.36 billion. This was attributed to the decreases in loans and receivables, cash and, due from other banks, financial assets at Fair Value through profit or loss, and investment properties.
