= DWIZ-AM =

Radio station in Metro Manila, Philippines

DWIZ
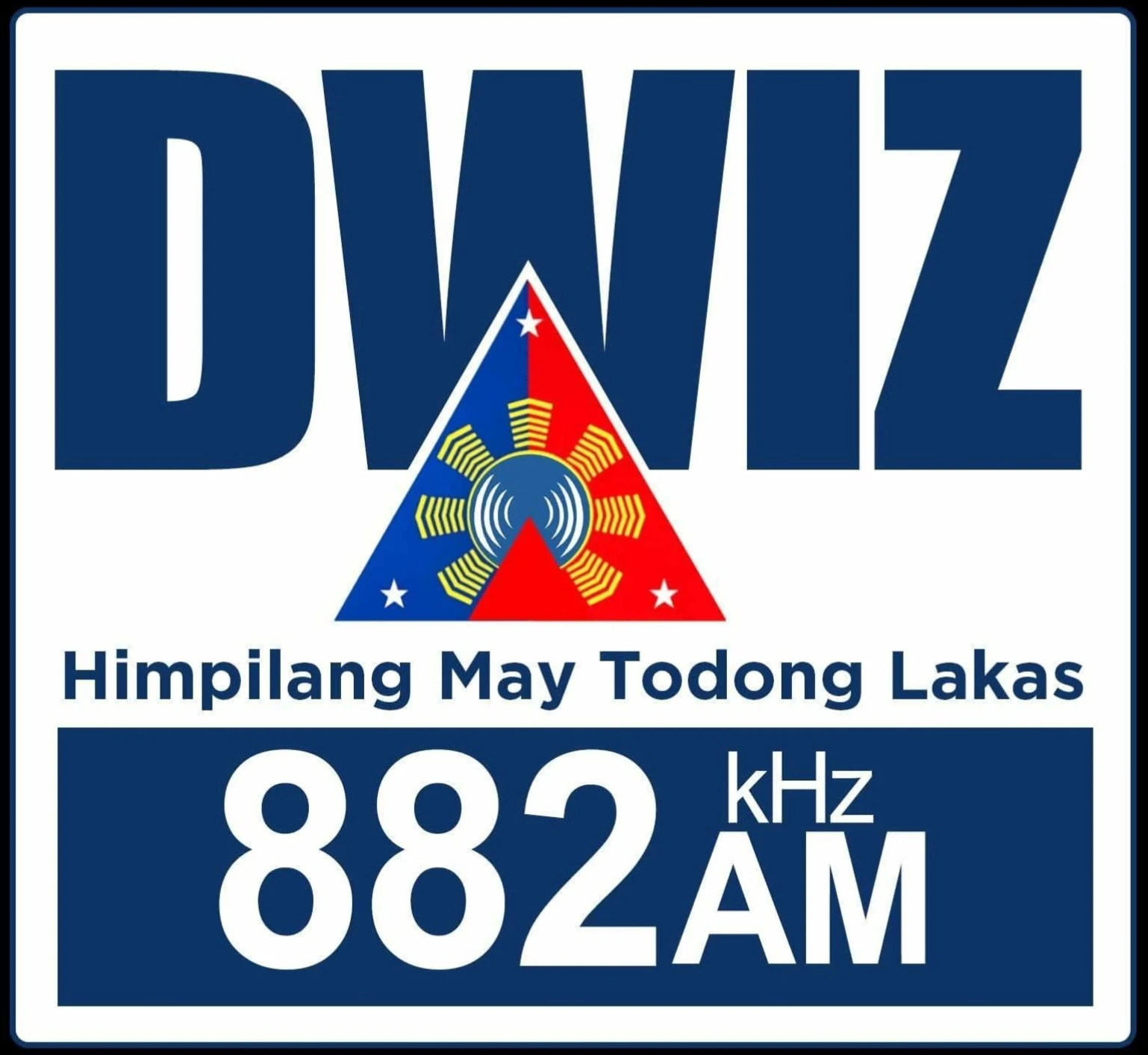
- Pasig; Philippines
- Broadcast area: Mega Manila and surrounding areas
- Frequency: 882 KHz
- Branding: DWIZ 882

Programming
- Language: Filipino
- Format: News, Talk, Music

Ownership
- Owner: Aliw Broadcasting Corporation
- Sister stations: DWQZ (Home Radio); DWBA-DTV (Aliw Channel 23)

History
- First air date: July 1, 1946
- Former call signs: KZPI (1946–1948); DZPI (1949−September 1972)
- Former frequencies: 800 kHz (1946−November 23, 1978)

Technical information
- Licensing authority: NTC
- Class: A (clear frequency)
- Power: 50,000 watts

Links
- Webcast: streema.com/radios/DWIZ
- Website: www.dwiz882am.com

DWIZ (882 AM) is a radio station owned and operated by Aliw Broadcasting Corporation, a subsidiary of the ALC Group of Companies. The station's studio is located at the 20th Floor, Citystate Centre, 709 Shaw Boulevard, Brgy. Oranbo, Pasig; while its transmitter is located along Osmeña St., Brgy. Pag-Asa, Obando, Bulacan.

== History ==
=== 1946–1948: KZPI ===
Present-day DWIZ began as KZPI—its last two call letters stood for Philippine Islands—a commercial radio station being established in 1946 by the Philippine Broadcasting Corporation (PBC) through the Soriano family, along with magazine chain owner Ramon Roces, as a post-war extension of the company's predecessor, Far Eastern Broadcasting Company. (Note: Far Eastern Broadcasting Corporation in another source. Not to be confused with Far East Broadcasting Company–Philippines, a currently-operating non-commercial Christian broadcast network.) FEBC had operated KZRM and KZRF (originally KZEG) until the beginning of the Japanese invasion of the Philippines in late 1941. KZPI was incorporated on June 4, and commenced a test broadcast on July 1—the same day KZRH resumed its broadcast.

Its first, small studio was located in the 5th Floor of the Filipinas Building at Plaza Moraga in Manila; its transmitter in Polo, Bulacan. The transmitting equipment was supplied by American company Raytheon Production Corporation. It broadcast at 800 kilocycles (kHz) in long wave, and had a 1-kilowatt power. Its operations were then financed by American-controlled Philippine Operations, Inc. Its first managing director was Norman Paige, an American radio veteran and former Pacific war correspondent for the Columbia Broadcasting System.

KZPI's equipment was yet to be fully set up by July 4 when it was among the three stations to cover the inaugural ceremonies for the formal declaration of independence from the United States at the Luneta Park, and for Manuel Roxas as the first president of the then newly restored Republic.

Daily programming in its first full year consisted of eight quarter-hour newscasts, dance music programs from the Manila Hotel and El Cairo Night Club, and some which were aired remotely.

Its sister stations, mediumwave and shortwave KZOK, were established in 1947; their transmitters were then located in Quezon City. KZOK would be relaunched in 1949 as DZAB–DZH5. (Note: In 1951, the stations were taken over by the Catholic-run University of Santo Tomas, and their facilities were later transferred; DZAB was rebranded as DZST. The mediumwave station is currently operated as Veritas 846; while the shortwave, as Radio Veritas Asia, ceased its broadcast in 2018.) PBC also had another station in Cebu.

=== 1949–1972: DZPI ===
Following the 1947 International Radio Conference by the International Telecommunication Union in the United States that alloted the letter "D" as an initial call letter for Philippine broadcast stations, which would be effective in 1949, KZPI was renamed DZPI.

Later that year, the Manila Broadcasting Company (now known as MBC Media Group) and the PBC made the country's strongest merging of broadcast companies at that time; thus DZPI served as a sister station of DZRH and DZMB.

By mid-1972, DZPI, being rebranded as Radio Philippines, had been transferred to Navotas, Rizal; its power had been increased to 5 kW. DZPI was able to report the arrest of several political leaders following President Ferdinand Marcos' declaration of martial law on September 21, 1972, which would be announced two days later. DZPI was taken off-air that same date.

=== 1972–1991: Sunshine City era ===
On September 24, 1972, DZPI was rebranded as DWIZ Sunshine City. As one of the stations established immediately after the declaration of Martial Law, it became one of the most influential Top 40 music stations in Metro Manila. In November 1978, it transferred to 882 kHz due to the adoption of the 9 kHz spacing for medium wave stations as stipulated by the Geneva Frequency Plan of 1975 (aka GE75) supplanting the NARBA-mandated 10 kHz spacing rule. At that time, it had a 50-kW power. In 1986, it shifted to a full service format with emphasis on news and music. In the first quarter of 1991, the Sunshine City brand was retired.

=== 1991–present: Todong Lakas era ===
In 1991, Aliw Broadcasting Corporation, a then-newly established broadcast network owned by Antonio Cabangon-Chua, acquired DWIZ. On May 12, it began its test broadcast from its headquarters in Dominga Building along Chino Roces Avenue, Makati through a 25-kW transmitter. It was relaunched on June 6 as a news, talk, and public service station with its tagline "Boses Pilipino, Radyo ng Tao" (The Voice of the Filipino, The People's Radio). (Note: Translated by sources as Voice of the Filipino People's Radio.)

DWIZ is known for pioneering the Broadcast Tandem System, wherein a pair of broadcasters on board man the station's newscasts. Its first major news coverages were the country's annual Independence Day celebrations and the eruption of Mount Pinatubo. Leading the station's first years of broadcast are some of the anchors and reporters carried over from DZRH led by Rey Langit, who served as its station manager from its first year until his resignation in 2016.

In 1994, DWIZ increased its power from 25,000 watts to 50,000 watts. As one of the few stations in the Metro Manila market authorized to operate with such power, it started carrying the tagline "Todong Lakas".

In 2000, DWIZ relocated to its current home in Citystate Centre along Shaw Boulevard, Pasig.

In 2003, Aliw Broadcasting Corporation and the Kabayan Radio and News Club inked an agreement wherein KRNC, which had a live radio service Kabayan Radio; aired DWIZ programs to reach Filipino migrant workers in Taiwan, Hong Kong, and Macau.

In 2005, DWIZ launched Karambola, a morning political commentary program featuring a panel of journalists and columnists led by Jonathan De la Cruz. Karambola is now one of the station's longest-running programs.

On January 3, 2014, DWIZ signed a 3-year memorandum of agreement with Radio Philippines Network (owner of CNN Philippines-affiliated stations and Radyo Ronda) for the expanded coverage of both TV and radio networks nationwide. As part of the deal, selected programs from Metro Manila began to be simulcast on the Radyo Ronda Network. DWIZ also launched its first ever radio jingle on July 14, 2014, a couple of days before Typhoon Glenda (Rammasun) wreaked havoc over Metro Manila.

In 2016, DWIZ upgraded its newly-improved 50,000-watt transmitter system standing on a 300-foot tower, providing improved signal reception in the Greater Luzon Area.

On January 30, 2023, DWIZ underwent programming changes and adopted the slogan "Nagbabalita ng Tama, Naglilingkod ng Tama". This coincided with the relaunch of Home Radio provincial stations under the DWIZ News FM branding and appointment of long-time DZRH continuity announcer Dennis Antenor Jr. as Aliw Broadcasting's Vice President for Business.

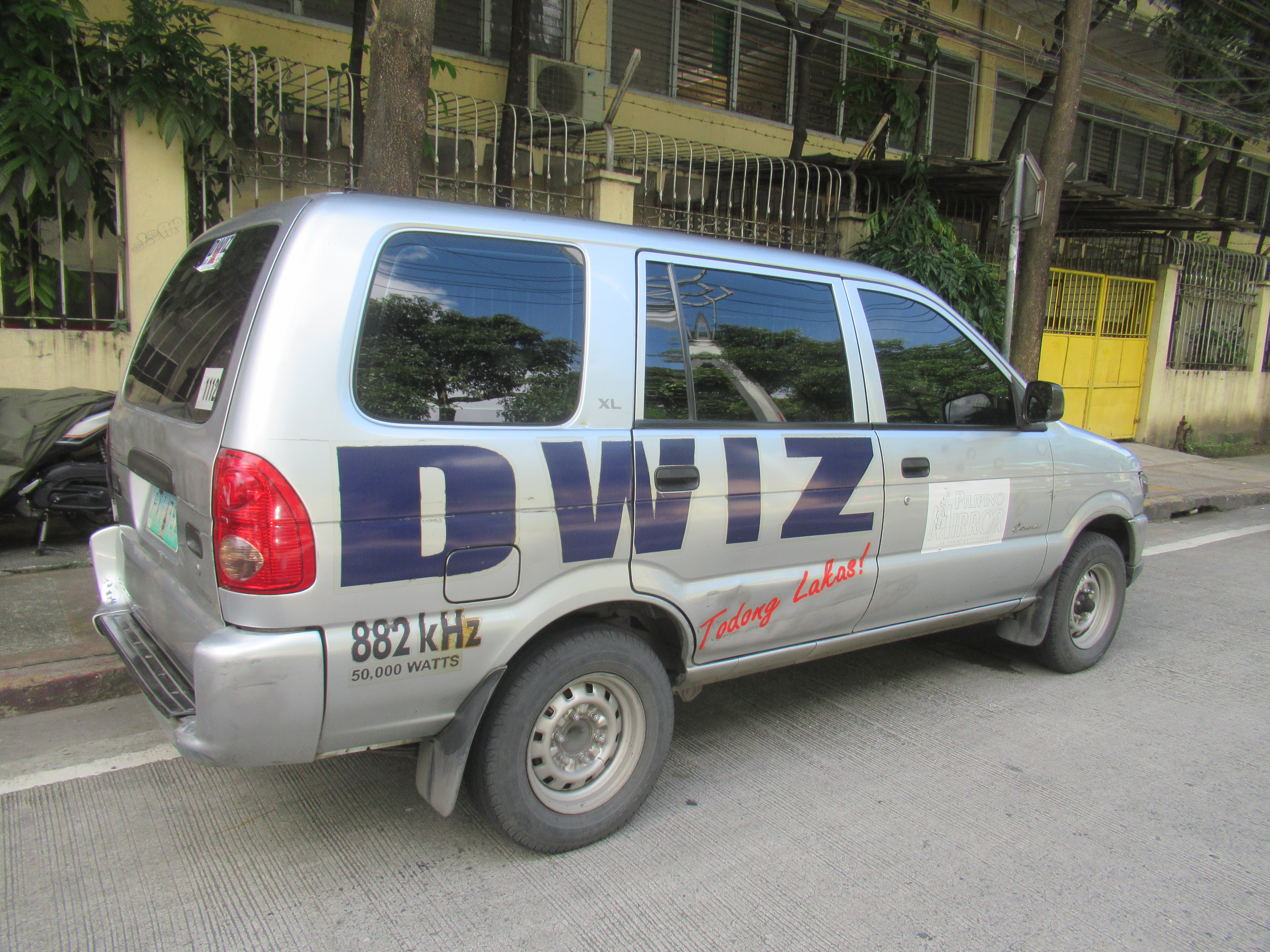
Broadcasting vehicle at Makati, Metro Manila, Philippines

On April 30, 2026, the DWIZ provincial stations made its final broadcast and were relaunched on May 8 under the Home Radio network. On May 11, as part of the transition under the helm of Joel Gorospe (formerly from DWWW 774 and 99.5 XFM), most of DWIZ's programs were axed and replaced with music fillers. New programming commenced on May 18, coinciding with the return of its old slogan "Todong Lakas".

== ALIW Channel 23 ==
On May 6, 2022, DWIZ started its TeleRadyo feed on digital TV via Channel 23 (527.143 MHz). The channel was awarded by the National Telecommunications Commission to Aliw last January 5.

On August 10, 2022, the channel started carrying the brand IZTV, with the tagline The News Company. It was officially launched on November 18. On January 30, 2023, the channel rebranded as ALIW Channel 23, coinciding with the reformatting of Home Radio's provincial stations under the DWIZ network.

Recently, the TeleRadyo feed was spun off to a new subchannel under the DWIZ News TV branding. Nonetheless, several of its programs are currently aired on Aliw Channel 23.

== Recognitions ==
The year 2014 and 2015 served as milestone for the station as it received several recognitions:

- Best Radio Documentary (Siyasat: "Damo") 23rd KBP Golden Dove Awards 2015
- The "Most Outstanding Radio Station of the Year" awarded by the Rotary Club of Manila Journalism Awards,
- The "Best Magazine Program" awarded to "Siyasat" by the KBP Golden Dove Awards,
- Citation in the "Best AM Radio Station" category in the KBP Golden Dove Awards
- Best Station Radio Category by the Universal Peace Federation
- Gawad Ulat for Most Supportive Radio Station by the Department of Social Welfare and Development

== Notable on-air personalities ==
=== Current ===
- Larry Gadon
- Jarius Bondoc
- Benjie Paras
- Ronnie Magsanoc
- Toni Rose Gayda
- Ben Evardone
- Papa Jack

=== Former ===
- Rey Langit
- Ernesto Maceda
- Juan Flavier
- Gregorio Honasan
- Salvador Escudero
- Ramon Tulfo
- Claire dela Fuente
- Roy Señeres
- Rolly Gonzalo
- Lito Atienza
- Blas Ople
- Gemma Cruz-Araneta
- Nikki Coseteng
- Arnold Clavio
- Imee Marcos
- Mocha Uson
- Dong Puno
- Teodoro Locsin Jr.
- Jesus Crispin “Boying” Remulla
- Percy Lapid
- Alex Santos
- Gani Oro
- Trixie Cruz-Angeles
- Francis Tolentino
- Juan Ponce Enrile
- Roberto Pagdanganan
- Evangeline Pascual
- Ferdinand Topacio
- Lorna Kapunan
- Art Borjal
