= Bellevue Theater =

Former cinema in Manila, Philippines

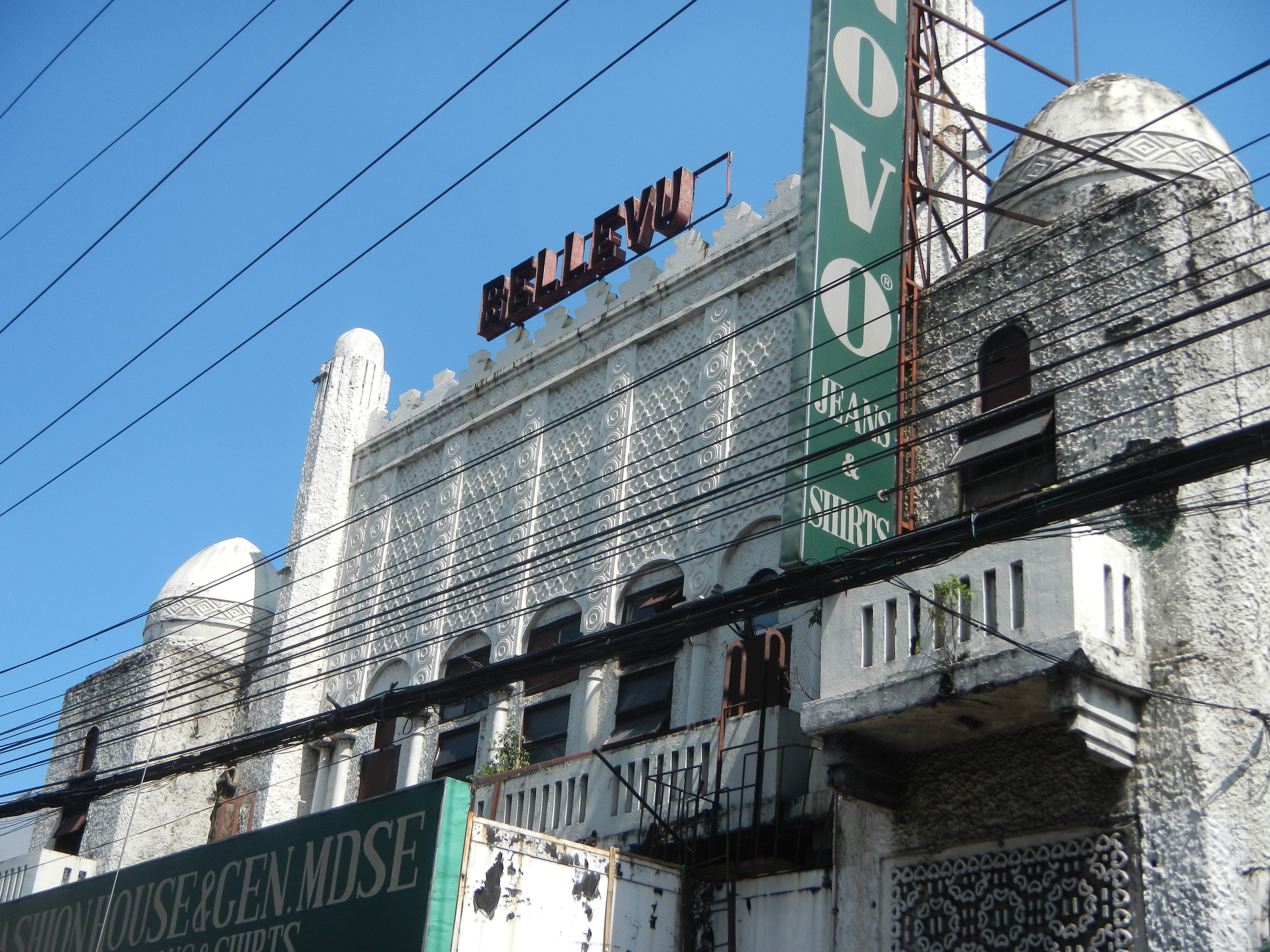
- Interactive map of Bellevue Theater
- Location: Paco, Manila
- Coordinates: 14.5779°N 120.9924°E

Bellevue Theater is a small theater located in Paco district, Manila, Philippines. The theater adopted Philippine Islamic imagery as its art deco theme, borrowing inspiration from the tradition of moro-moro theatrical scenography.

== Architecture ==
The theater was symmetrical, with a central plane of decorative concrete pierced work that covers almost the entire facade and flanked by two rectangular volumes topped with domes on both sides. At ground level, the cinema opened to a small foyer that led to a pseudo-grand staircase, which was guarded on both sides by sculptures of harem maidens. At street level, there are two emergency doors with pointed arches on the opposites sides of the façade.

Out of the listed twenty movie houses surveyed by the American Express Company in their tourist guidebook Manila and the Philippines, only two of them survived today: the Manila Metropolitan Theater (1931) on Padre Burgos Avenue, Manila, and the last fully functional single-screen theater, the Cine Bellevue (1933) in Paco, Manila, which had an Orientalist leitmotif that employed the Neo-Mudejar Art Deco strain and has been converted into a clothing store.
