= Jose Calida =

Filipino lawyer

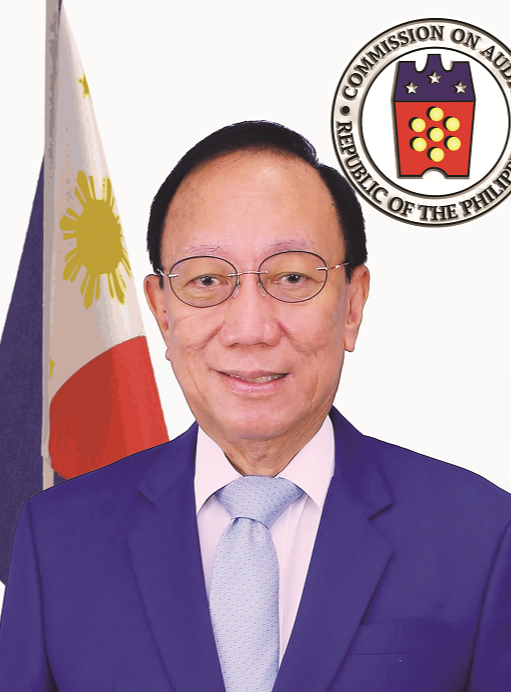
- 2022, COA portrait

Chairman of the Commission on Audit Ad interim
- In office July 4, 2022 – October 4, 2022
- Appointed by: Bongbong Marcos
- Preceded by: Rizalina P. Justol
- Succeeded by: Gamaliel Cordoba

Solicitor General of the Philippines
- In office June 30, 2016 – June 30, 2022
- President: Rodrigo Duterte
- Preceded by: Florin Hilbay
- Succeeded by: Menardo Guevarra

Executive Director of the Dangerous Drugs Board
- In office January 21, 2004 – October 31, 2004
- President: Gloria Macapagal Arroyo
- Preceded by: Efren Q. Fernandez
- Succeeded by: Edgar C. Galvante

Justice Undersecretary
- In office March 12, 2001 – January 20, 2004
- President: Gloria Macapagal Arroyo

Personal details
- Born: Jose Callangan Calida; July 7, 1950 (age 75) Nuevo Iloco, Davao, (now Mawab, Davao de Oro) Philippines
- Party: CIBAC
- Spouse: Milagros Parantar Ordaneza
- Education: Ateneo de Davao University (BA, PhD); Ateneo de Manila University (LLB)
- Occupation: Business executive
- Profession: Lawyer

Jose Callangan Calida (born July 7, 1950) is a Filipino lawyer. He previously served as Undersecretary of Justice and executive director of Dangerous Drugs Board under the Arroyo administration, as Solicitor General under the Duterte administration, and as Chairman of Commission on Audit (COA) under the Marcos administration.

During his time as a Solicitor General, Calida is a controversial figure on the issues regarding the shutdown of television network ABS-CBN during the COVID-19 pandemic.

== Life and education ==
Calida was born in Nuevo Iloco, Davao (present-day Mawab, Davao de Oro). A born again Christian, he is married to Milagros Parantar Ordaneza who is also from Davao with whom he has three children.

Calida holds a Doctor of Philosophy degree in English from the Ateneo de Davao University in 1969. He studied law at the Ateneo de Manila University Law School where he was a dean's lister. He graduated in 1973 and was admitted to the Bar the following year with a general average of 83.25 percent (the highest grade of 100 percent in Criminal Law, 90 percent in Civil Law and 90 percent in Taxation) in the 1974 Philippine Bar Examination.

Calida is a member of the Aquila Legis Fraternity.

== Career ==
Calida is a practicing lawyer and founding partner of J. Calida & Associates law firm based in Davao del Sur. He served as secretary general of the Volunteers Against Crime and Corruption during the administration of President Fidel Ramos and was the convenor of the God's People's Coalition for Righteousness that staged protests and prayer rallies against the proliferation of pornography and smut films in the 1990s. In 1997, he led the group called Support the Initiatives for the Good of the Nation or SIGN which pushed for Charter Change through people's initiative and helped the Pirma movement gather signatures to allow then President Fidel Ramos to run for reelection through a plebiscite. He also co-founded the party list group called Citizens' Battle Against Corruption and served as its president in 1997.

Calida was a member of the prosecution team during the impeachment trial of President Joseph Estrada in 2000. Following the Second EDSA Revolution, he was appointed by the newly installed President Gloria Macapagal Arroyo as the Undersecretary of the Department of Justice (DOJ) under Secretaries Hernando B. Perez in 2001, Merceditas Gutierrez in 2002, and Simeon Datumanong in 2003. As Justice Undersecretary, he was in charge of the National Bureau of Investigation, the Office of the Government Corporate Counsel, the DOJ Task Force on Corruption and Internal Security, and the DOJ Task Force on Financial Fraud and Money Laundering. In 2004, he assumed the leadership of the Dangerous Drugs Board as the agency's executive director.

Calida returned to private law and business after leaving government service in October 2004. He was president and chair of Vigilant Investigative and Security Agency, which won a contract with the Philippine Amusement and Gaming Corporation in 2010. He also served as senior vice president of the insurance company Prudential Guarantee and Assurance Inc. Calida was endorsed by then Davao City Vice Mayor Rodrigo Duterte as a candidate for the Ombudsman post in 2011. Prior to his return to government service, he was also one of the campaign managers of the 2016 Duterte-Marcos presidential-vice presidential campaign. President Duterte has described Calida as "passionately... pro-Marcos."

Calida faces criminal and administrative charges at the Office of the Ombudsman. According to one of the charges, Calida allegedly violated the Code of Conduct and Ethical Standards for Public Officials and Employees for failing to divest his interest in his family-owned security agency, which received ₱261.39 million worth of contracts from the Department of Justice and other government agencies. Calida has denied any conflict of interest and said he is not liable under the Code of Conduct for Public Officials nor the anti-graft law. In the Philippine House of Representatives, the Makabayan bloc said that Calida should be removed from office. Bayan Muna party-list Representative Carlos Zarate alleged that Calida used his position to get government contracts in what was a clear case of corruption in government.

Amid the Philippine drug war, Calida blocked the release of documents on drug war killings. In 2017 and 2019, the Supreme Court ordered Calida to release documents on more than 3,000 killings during the drug war.

Calida was reported to be the second highest-paid government official in 2019, earning ₱16.95 million according to a report from Commission on Audit (COA). He earned a cumulative ₱27.9 million in allowances and honoraria from 2017 to 2020. The COA flagged Calida and his office for excessive allowances.

In March 2020, the House of Representatives summoned Calida to appear in an investigation on ₱95.42 billion in unpaid debts owed to the government by Meralco and First Gen Hydro Power Corporation.

During the oral arguments at the Supreme Court on the Anti-Terror Law in April 2021, Calida red-tagged former Bayan Muna Congress Representative Neri Colmenares and progressive groups. Colmenares criticized Calida, saying that red-tagging is a deadly offense that threatens the life and security of its victims.

Calida was appointed by President-elect Bongbong Marcos as the Chairman of Commission on Audit (COA) on June 29, 2022; he assumed the post on July 4. However, his appointment was bypassed by the Commission on Appointments (CA) on September 28 and he was not reappointed by Marcos. Calida resigned from the post on October 4 due to undisclosed reasons; he was replaced by Gamaliel Cordoba.

== Wikipedia biography incident ==
During his time as a Solicitor General under President Rodrigo Duterte, Jose Calida successfully ordered the National Telecommunications Commission (NTC) a cease and desist order against the Philippines' largest television network, ABS-CBN. After the network ceased its broadcasting operations on May 5, 2020, an IP user added a nickname "Demonyo" (transl. demon) to his Wikipedia biography. As of May 8, Calida's Wikipedia article has no nicknames at all.

== See also ==
- Shutdown of ABS-CBN broadcasting

Government offices
Preceded by Rizalina P. Justol	Chairman of the Commission on Audit; 2022	Succeeded by Gamaliel Cordoba
Vacant
Political offices
Preceded by Efren Fernandez	Executive Director of the Dangerous Drugs Board; 2004	Succeeded by Edgar Galvante
Preceded by Florin Hilbay	Solicitor General of the Philippines; 2016–2022	Succeeded by Menardo Guevarra
