= Baliuag University =

Private university in Bulacan, Philippines

- Pamantasang Baliwag (Filipino)
- Former names: Baliuag Institute (1925–1947); Baliuag Junior College (1947–1968); Baliuag Colleges (1968–2001)
- Motto: Let's Be The Best We Can Be!; Patria. Scientia. Virtus. (Country. Science. Virtue.)
- Type: Private non-sectarian research coeducational basic and higher education institution
- Established: February 2, 1925 (101 years and 194 days)
- Chairman: Asteya M. Santiago
- President: Patricia B. Lagunda
- Vice-president: Flordeliza A. Castro (VP for Academic Affairs)
- Principal: Alvin G. Alma Jose (Basic Education Department); Ramadan D.C. De Jesus (Senior High School Department)
- Location: Gil Carlos St., Baliwag, Bulacan, Philippines; 14°57′11″N 120°53′52″E
- Campus: Urban
- Colors: Shamrock and White
- Nickname: Hornets
- Website: baliuagu.edu.ph
- Location in Bulacan Location in Luzon Location in the Philippines

Baliuag University (B.U. or Baliuag U) is a private university in the Philippines. It was founded in 1925 and was the first school granted full autonomy in Central Luzon by the Commission on Higher Education. It was founded in 1925 by Domingo “Tatang” Santiago. Sr, as the Baliuag Institute.

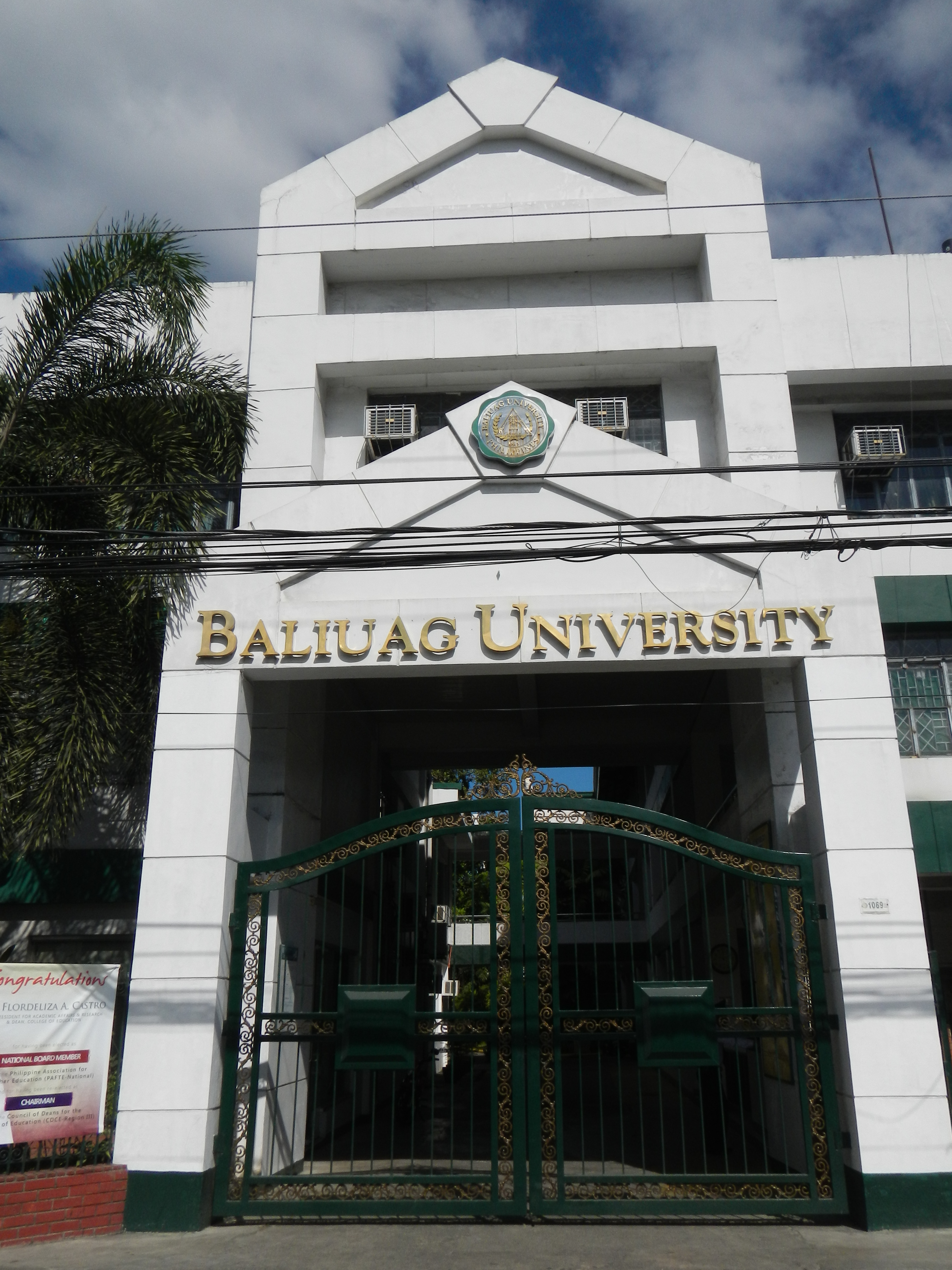
Baliuag University main building gate

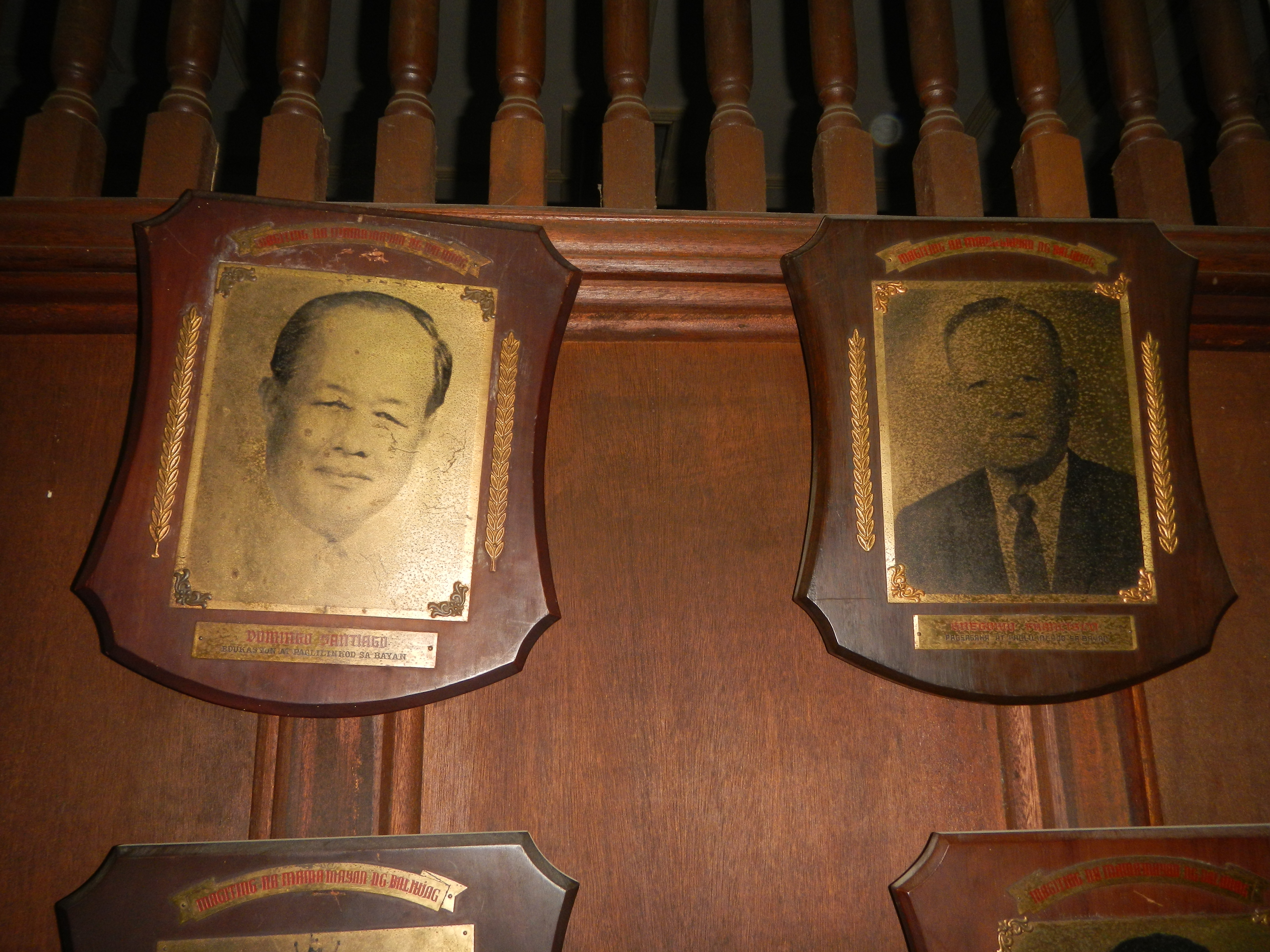
Domingo “Tatang” Santiago. Sr.

It offers graduate programs in education, business, library science, and nursing. Its undergraduate programs in business administration and accountancy, liberal arts and education are Level 3 accredited. Other offerings are engineering, nursing, library science, computer studies, and hospitality management. It offers two-year Voc-Tech, Associate in Health Science as well as kindergarten, grade school and high school programs, LET review classes, call center training, and college evening programs.

It is one of four Integrated Management of Childhood Illness (IMCI) training schools in the Philippines; the others are the University of the Philippines Diliman, University of Santo Tomas, and St. Paul University Iloilo.

== Academics ==
=== Basic education ===
- Kindergarten
- Grade School (Grades 1-6)
- Junior High School (Grades 7-10)
- Senior High School (Grades 11 and 12)

=== Undergraduate ===
==== College of Liberal Arts and General Education (CLAGE) ====
- Bachelor of Arts in Communication
- Bachelor of Arts in Communication and Bachelor of Arts in Journalism (a double-degree program in partnership with Manila Times College)
- Bachelor of Arts in Political Science

==== College of Business Administration and Accountancy (CBAA) ====
- Bachelor of Science in Accountancy
- Bachelor of Science in Management Accounting
- Bachelor of Science in Business Administration

==== College of Education and Human Development (CEHD) ====
- Bachelor of Early Childhood Education
- Bachelor of Elementary Education
- Bachelor of Secondary Education
- Bachelor of Physical Education
- Bachelor of Library and Information Science
- Bachelor of Science in Psychology
- Bachelor of Science in Social Work
- Certificate in Teacher Education
- Post-Baccalaureate Diploma in Alternative Learning System

==== College of Environmental Design and Engineering (CEDE) ====
- Bachelor of Science in Civil Engineering
- Bachelor of Science in Computer Engineering
- Bachelor of Science in Electrical Engineering
- Bachelor of Science in Electronics Engineering
- Bachelor of Science in Industrial Engineering
- Bachelor of Science in Mechanical Engineering

==== College of Nursing and Allied Health Sciences (CNAHS) ====
- Bachelor of Science in Nursing (Level IV Reaccredited)
- Bachelor of Science in Nutrition and Dietetics
- Bachelor of Science in Medical Technology/Medical Laboratory Science

==== College of Information Technology Education (CITE) ====
- Associate in Computer Technology
- Bachelor of Science in Computer Science
- Bachelor of Science in Information Technology

==== College of Hospitality Management and Tourism (CHMT) ====
- Bachelor of Science in Hospitality Management
- Bachelor of Science in Tourism Management

==== School of Graduate Studies ====
- Doctoral Programs
  - Doctor of Education
  - Doctor of Business Administration
- Master's Program
  - Master in Business Administration
  - Master in Public Administration
  - Master of Library & Information Science
  - Master of Arts in Nursing
  - Master of Science in Nursing
  - Master of Science in Hospitality & Tourism Management
  - Master of Arts in Education
  - Master of Arts in Teaching
  - Master in Information Technology

== Baliuag University Cultural and Sports Center ==
The Baliuag University Cultural and Sports Center is a gymnasium complex located at the Annex 2 of the university. The ground floor serves as the mock hotel, College of Hospitality Management and Tourism, and the second floor is the gymnasium which can seat 2,000 or more people. It serves as the Faculty of the Physical Education department. It was used in many activities such as sports, studies, and events.

== The Green Building (University I.T. Building) ==
The Green Building is the home of College of Information Technology Education and medical/dental clinic of the university.

== Gallery ==
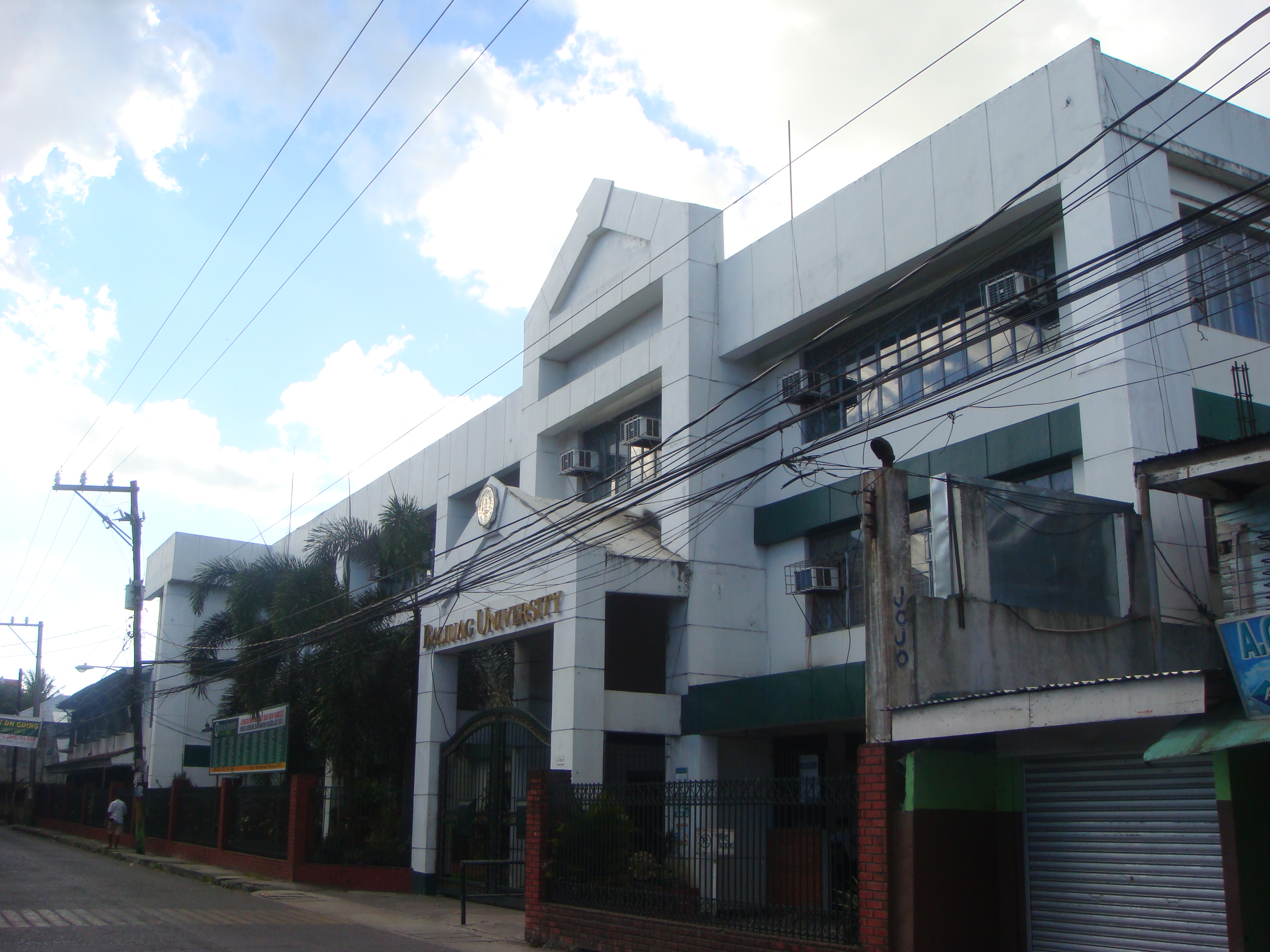
Baliuag University (Gil Carlos Street)

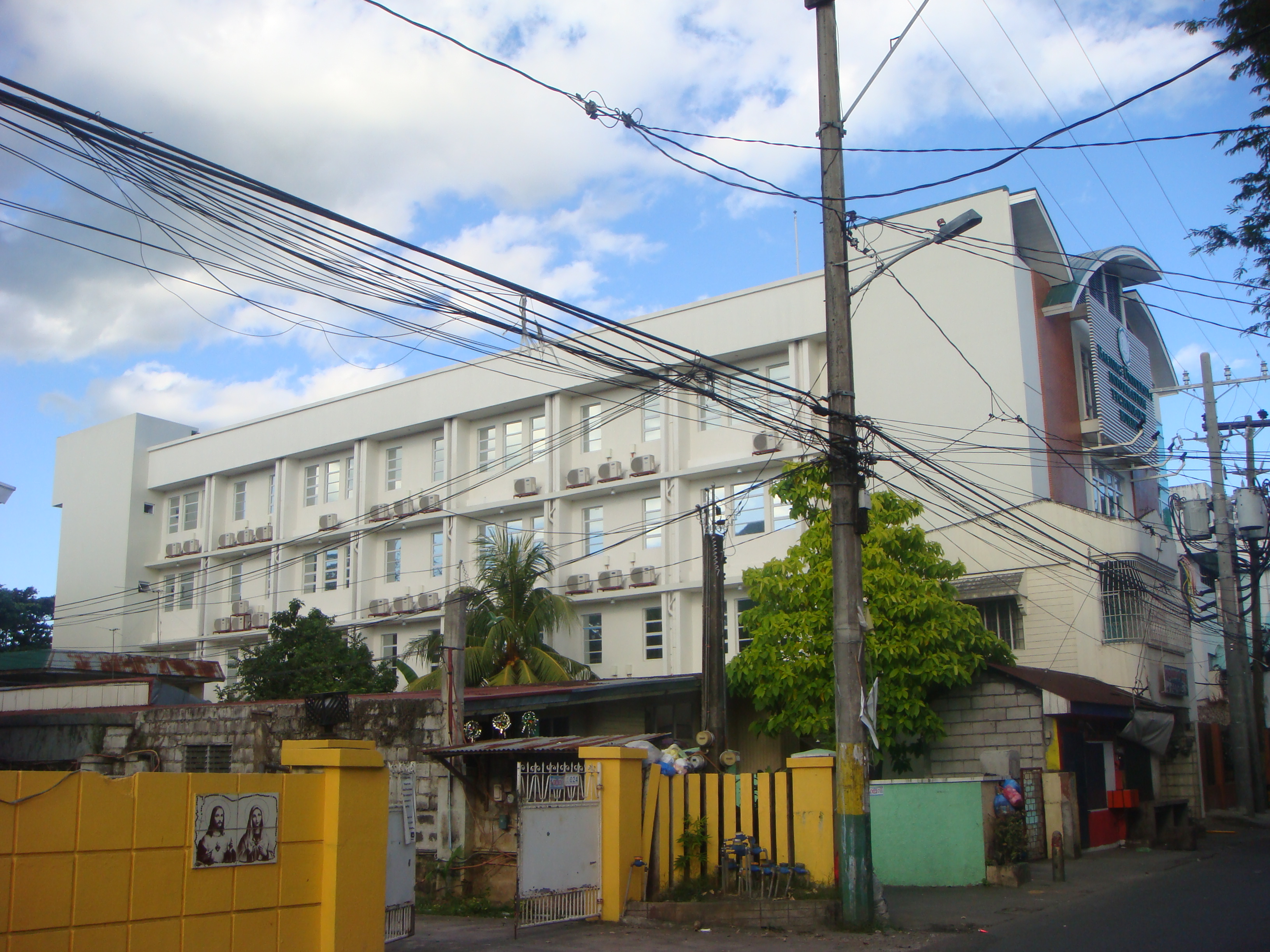
New BU Information Technology Building (the first Green Building in Bulacan; it has 11 Computer Laboratories, a SMART Room, 3 lecture Rooms, Internet and Multimedia Rooms

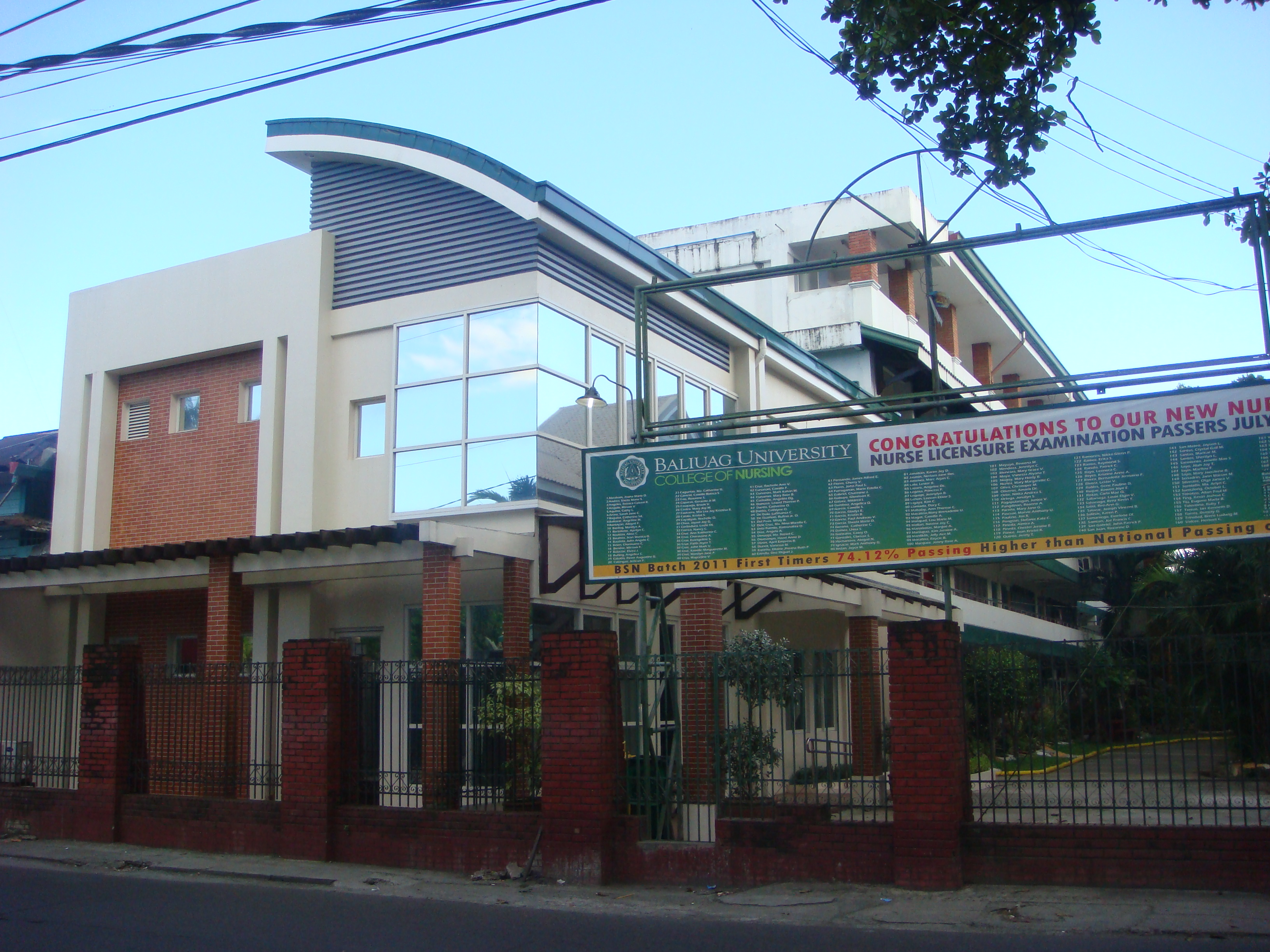
BU Main Building I

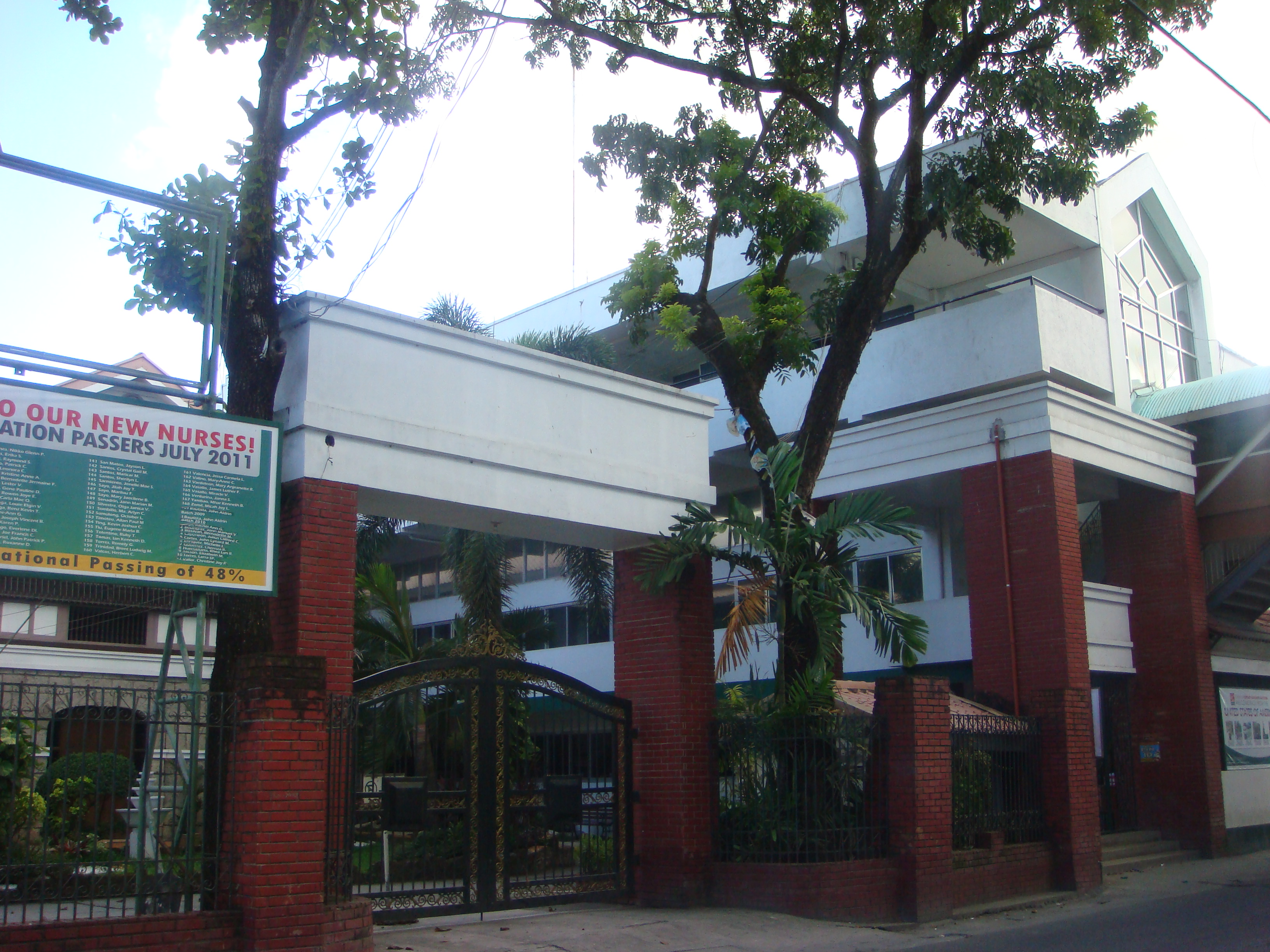
BU Main Building II

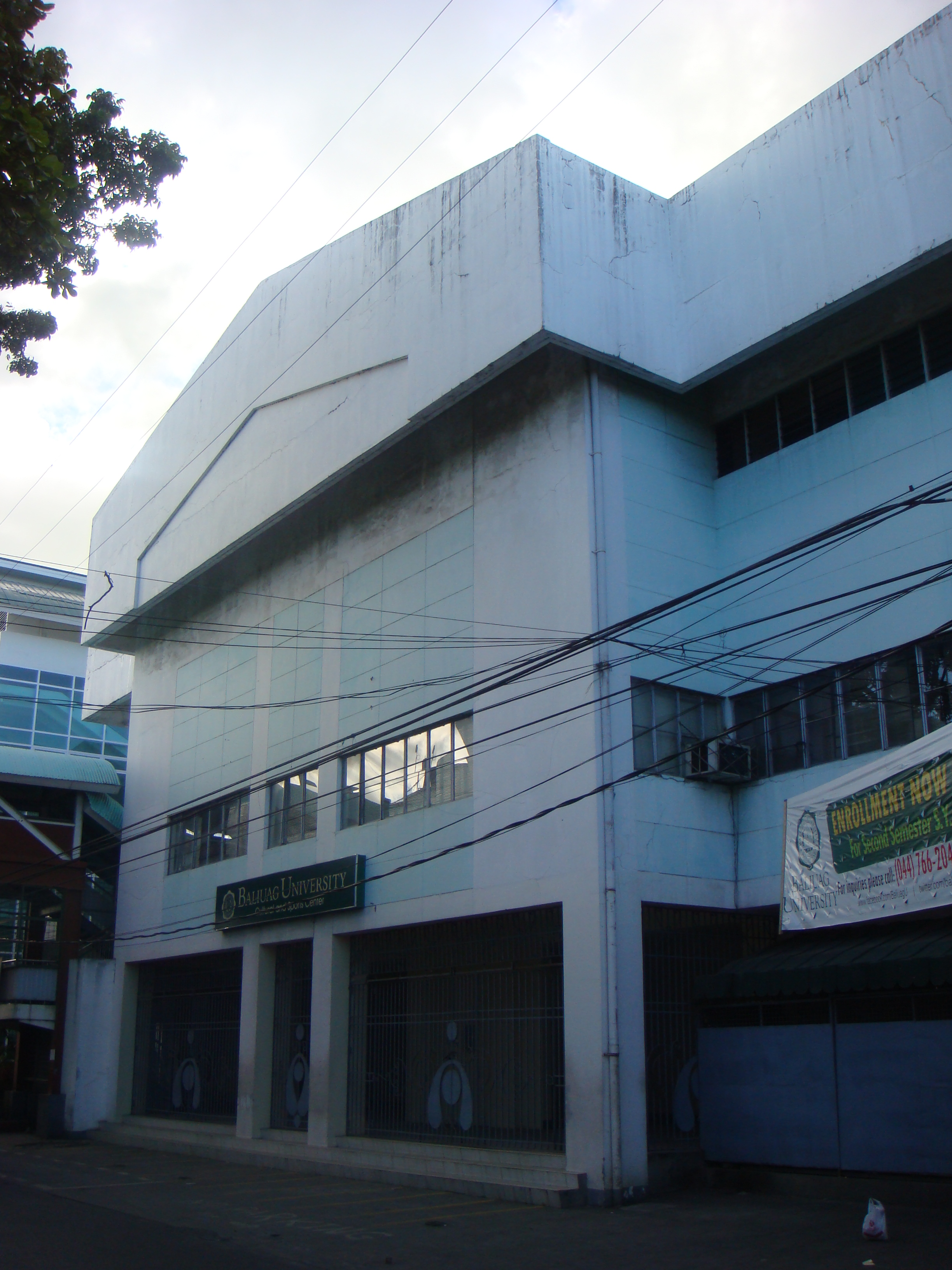
BU Cultural and Sports Center
