= Presidential spokesperson (Philippines) =

Office of the President of the Philippines

Spokesperson of the president of the Philippines
- Tagapagsalita ng Pangulo ng Pilipinas
- Appointer: President of the Philippines
- Term length: At the president’s pleasure
- Formation: 1998
- Abolished: June 30, 2022

The presidential spokesperson was a government official whose primary responsibility was to serve as the speaking representative of the president of the Philippines. The press secretary (previously the secretary of the Presidential Communications Operations Office) has historically assumed the role.

== History ==
The president of the Philippines has been considered as the communicator-in-chief – with the chief executive's speeches and statements reflective of Philippine government policy. Starting from the administration of President Manuel L. Quezon, communications of the president has been supported by the presidential staff. The Executive Secretary, since from the time of the first officeholder, Jorge B. Vargas has served a dual role of presidential spokesperson and de facto press secretary.

President Elpidio Quirino was the first chief executive to institutionalize the presidential communications functions in a team, by establishing the Philippine Information Council. The Press Secretary's role during Quirino's term was defined as "serves as the presidential spokesman and his functions include issuing press releases and statements for the President and other related matters". President Ferdinand Marcos' administration was aided by the Press Secretary, Information Minister, the National Media Production Board head, and the President's Center for Strategic Studies head.

President Corazon Aquino established the presidential spokesperson as a distinct position, appointing Rene Saguisag to the role. In 1987, the post of press secretary was revived. The posts of presidential spokesperson and press secretary has been erratic; it has been dissolved, altered, and revived.

President Joseph Estrada abolished the role of presidential spokesperson through Memorandum Order No. 97, issued on April 24, 2000 and transfers the duties associated to the role to the press secretary. His successor, Gloria Macapagal Arroyo restored the position of presidential spokesperson.

On June 30, 2022, President Bongbong Marcos issued Executive Order No. 2, which abolished the said position once again. All powers and functions were transferred to the Office of the Press Secretary.

== Role ==
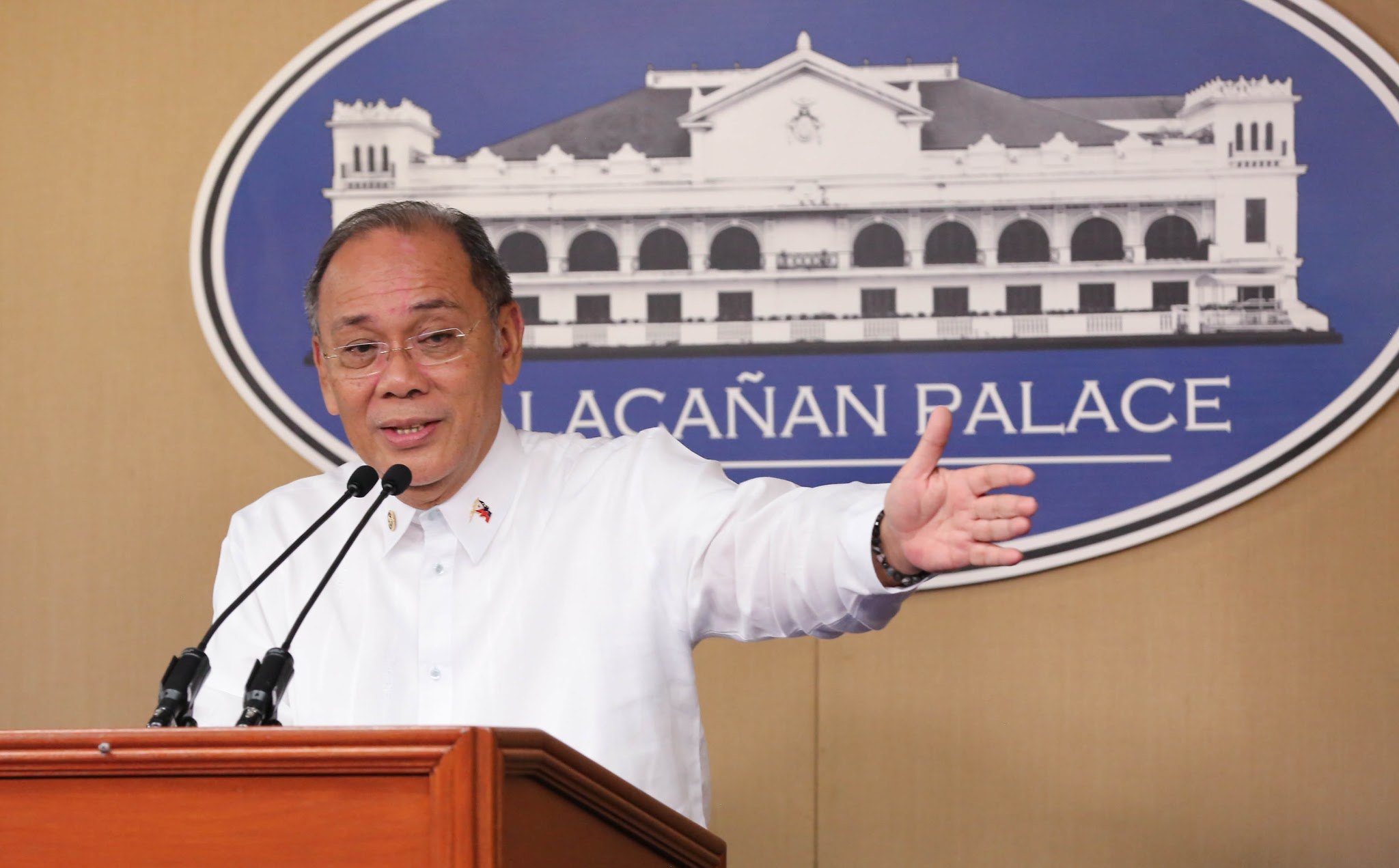
Presidential spokesperson Ernesto Abella speaking at a press briefing at the Malacañang Palace

The presidential spokesperson task is to speaks in behalf of the president of the Philippines on matters of "public interest, among other things". The officeholder often serves as the primary source of presidential directives in the absence of the president.

According to Harry Roque, one of people who became presidential spokesperson for President Rodrigo Duterte, the role requires to set aside one's personal stances and to relay the positions of the president. He assuming the position itself, has been subject of controversy.

Appointees to the presidential spokesperson role has never been subject to confirmation by the Congress. During the administration of President Bongbong Marcos, press secretary Trixie Cruz-Angeles assumed the role of presidential spokesperson.

== List ==
=== Prior to 1998 ===
Rene Saguisag served as President Corazon Aquino's initial spokesman until his resignation in 1987 to run for Senator. Adolfo Azcuna also served as Aquino's spokesman.

=== 1998–2022 ===
Portrait	Name	Term Began	Term Ended	President
	Jerry Barican	1998	2000	Joseph Ejercito Estrada
	Renato Corona	2001	2002	Gloria Macapagal Arroyo
	Rigoberto Tiglao	April 2002	2002	Gloria Macapagal Arroyo
	Ignacio Bunye	January 20, 2003	2008	Gloria Macapagal Arroyo
	Eduardo Ermita	May 20, 2008	June 30, 2010	Gloria Macapagal Arroyo
	Edwin Lacierda	June 30, 2010	June 30, 2016	Benigno S. Aquino III
	Ernesto Abella	June 30, 2016	October 30, 2017	Rodrigo Duterte
	Harry Roque	October 30, 2017	October 15, 2018	Rodrigo Duterte
	Salvador Panelo	October 15, 2018	April 13, 2020	Rodrigo Duterte
	Harry Roque	April 13, 2020	November 15, 2021	Rodrigo Duterte
	Karlo Nograles (Acting)	November 15, 2021	March 7, 2022	Rodrigo Duterte
	Martin Andanar (Acting)	March 8, 2022	June 30, 2022	Rodrigo Duterte
Office abolished by virtue of Executive Order No. 2, s. 2022. All powers and functions transferred to the Office of the Press Secretary.				Bongbong Marcos

== See also ==
- Secretary of the Presidential Communications Operations Office
- Presidential Communications Group
- Office of the President of the Philippines
