= Alip =

Alip is a surname. Notable people with the surname include:

- Jaime Aristotle Alip (born 1957), Filipino social entrepreneur
- Nuraly Alip (born 1999), Kazakh footballer

== See also ==
- Alie
