= Cesar Chavez (journalist) =

Filipino journalist and media executive

The Honourable Cesar B. Chavez Ph.D., MNSA, CESE
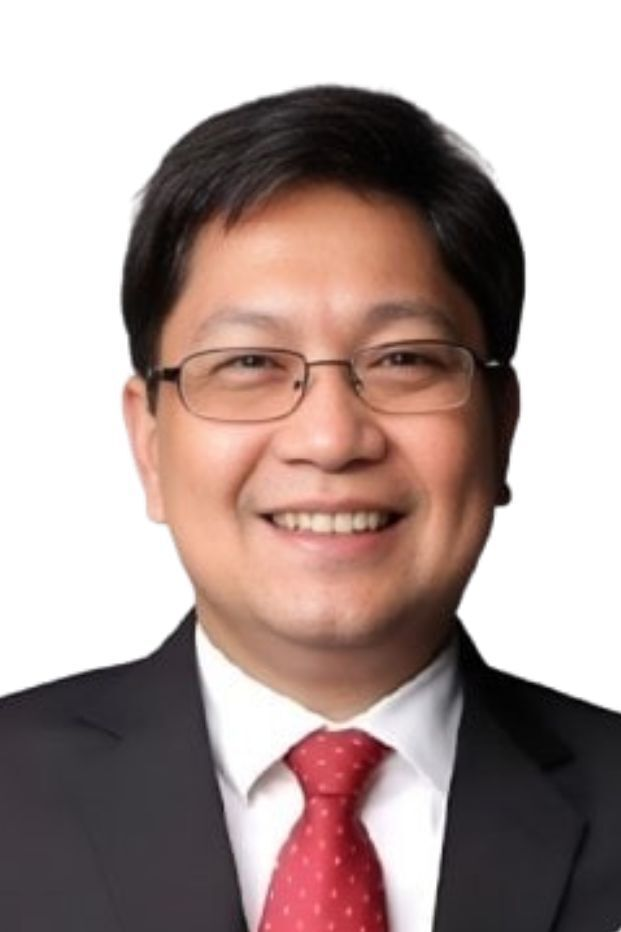
- Official portrait, 2024

Chief of Staff, Office of the City Mayor, Manila
- Incumbent
- Assumed office June 30, 2025
- Mayor: Isko Moreno Domagoso
- Preceded by: Joshue R. Santiago
- In office July 1, 2019 – February 28, 2022
- Mayor: Isko Moreno Domagoso
- Preceded by: Alexander Morales
- Succeeded by: Jorjette B. Aquino

Secretary of the Presidential Communications Office
- Acting
- In office September 5, 2024 – February 24, 2025
- President: Bongbong Marcos
- Preceded by: Cheloy Garafil
- Succeeded by: Jay Ruiz

Personal details
- Born: Cesar Bermejo Chavez; December 6, 1965 (age 60) San Jose, Camarines Sur, Philippines
- Children: 4
- Education: Adamson University (AB); National Defense College of the Philippines (MNSA); Bicol University (PhD)
- Occupation: Government Official
- Profession: Media practitioner Broadcast journalist

Cesar Bermejo Chavez (born December 6, 1965) is a Filipino government official and former media executive currently serving as the chief of staff to Manila City Mayor Isko Moreno since June 30, 2025; a position he previously held in 2021.

Before returning as Moreno's chief of staff, Chavez served as acting Secretary of the Presidential Communications Office, appointed by President Bongbong Marcos on September 5, 2024, succeeding Atty. Cheloy Garafil. He stepped down from the role on February 28, 2025.

== Early life and education ==
Chavez was born in San Jose, Camarines Sur. He completed his Bachelor of Arts in political science from Adamson University in 1989. He later obtained his Master in National Security Administration from the National Defense College of the Philippines in 2000. In 2008, he earned his Doctor of Philosophy in Peace and Security from Bicol University.

== Media career ==
While a student at Adamson University, Chavez joined DZRH in 1986 as its youngest reporter. He served as the assistant vice president and director for news and public affairs at Manila Broadcasting Company (MBC), one of the Philippines' largest radio networks. Additionally, he was the general manager of the Nation Broadcasting Corporation/DZAR, where he oversaw the station's operations and programming.

== Government service ==
Chavez has held various positions in government service. He served as the chairman and chief executive officer of the National Youth Commission from 1998 to 2000 and commissioner-at-large of the same body from 1995 to 1998. From 2014 to 2015, he worked as assistant general manager of the Metropolitan Manila Development Authority (MMDA).

In the transportation sector, he served as Assistant Secretary for Rail from September 2016 to February 2017 under the Department of Transportation (DOTr), and became the Undersecretary for Railways of the agency until November 2017.

Chavez was the chief of staff of Manila City Mayor Isko Moreno until 2021. Chavez said he resigned in order to return to MBC. Chavez then served as Undersecretary for Railways from July 2022 to December 2023 again under DOTr.

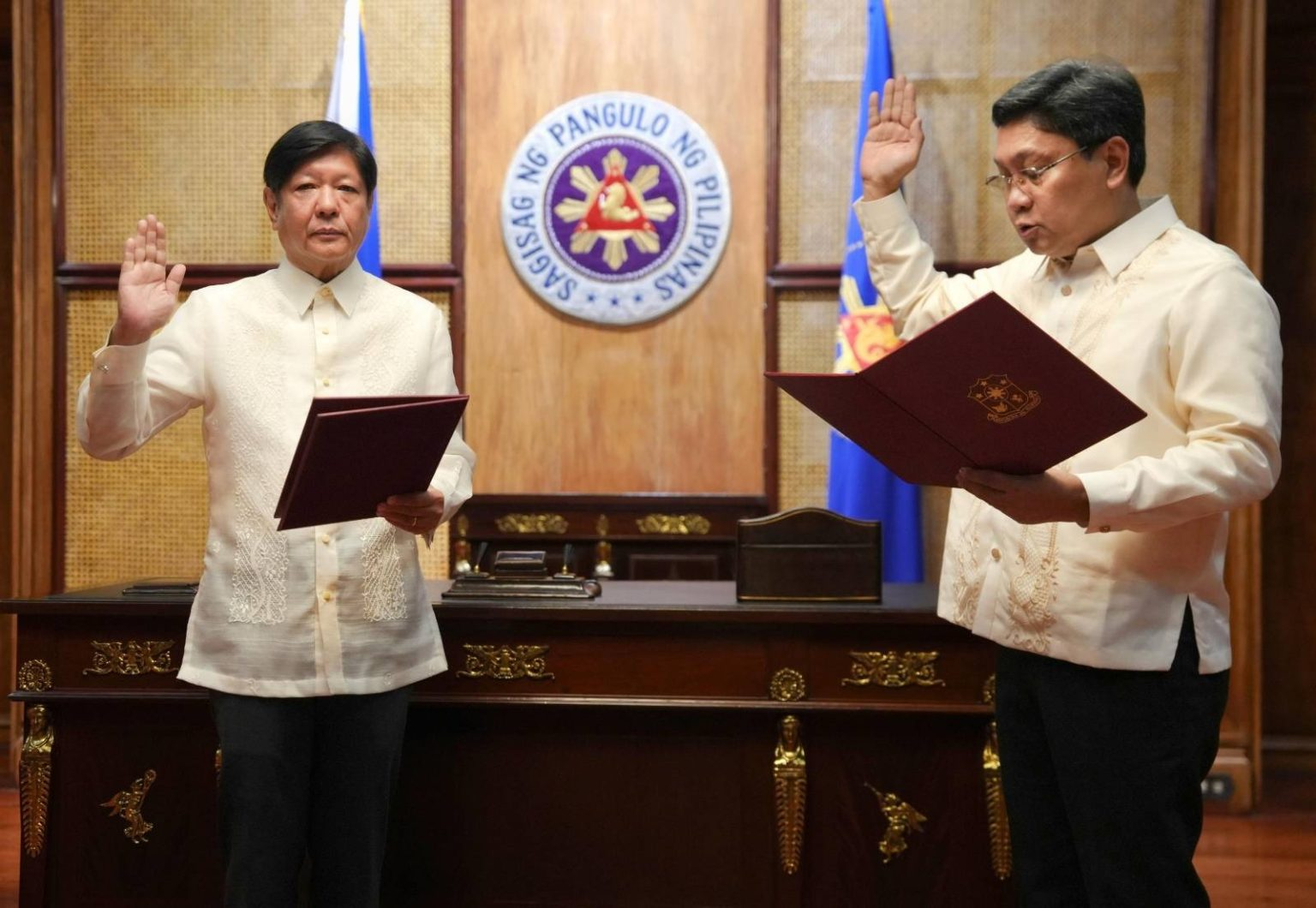
Chavez taking the oath as the acting Secretary of the Presidential Communications Office before President Bongbong Marcos on Malacañan Palace, September 5, 2024

=== Presidential Communications Office (2023—2025) ===
On December 6, 2023, Chavez was appointed by President Bongbong Marcos to be the Senior Undersecretary for Strategic Communications under the Presidential Communications Office. Before his appointment as Senior Undersecretary, he was first offered to be the Press Secretary after the resignation of lawyer and blogger Trixie Cruz-Angeles.

On September 5, 2024, Cheloy Garafil stepped down as the Secretary of the Presidential Communications Office for her appointment as the chairperson and Resident Representative of the Manila Economic and Cultural Office. Chavez was then appointed as Acting Secretary of the Presidential Communications Office after subsequent changes were made in the palace press office.

On February 20, 2025, he announced his resignation officially stepping down on February 28, 2025, Chavez didn't mention the cause of his resignation, although he said that "I have fallen short of what was expected of me." On February 24, 2025, Jay Ruiz, a veteran broadcaster and journalist succeeded him as Ad Interim Secretary.

=== Return to Manila as Chief of Staff (2025—present) ===
Chavez return as Chief of Staff of the Office of the Mayor under Mayor Isko Moreno on June 30, 2025.

== Personal life ==
Chavez is married and has four children.

Political offices
Preceded by Cheloy Garafil	Secretary of the Presidential Communications Office; Acting; 2024–2025	Succeeded by Jay Ruiz; Ad Interim
