= Ida Moberg =

Finnish composer and conductor (1859–1947)

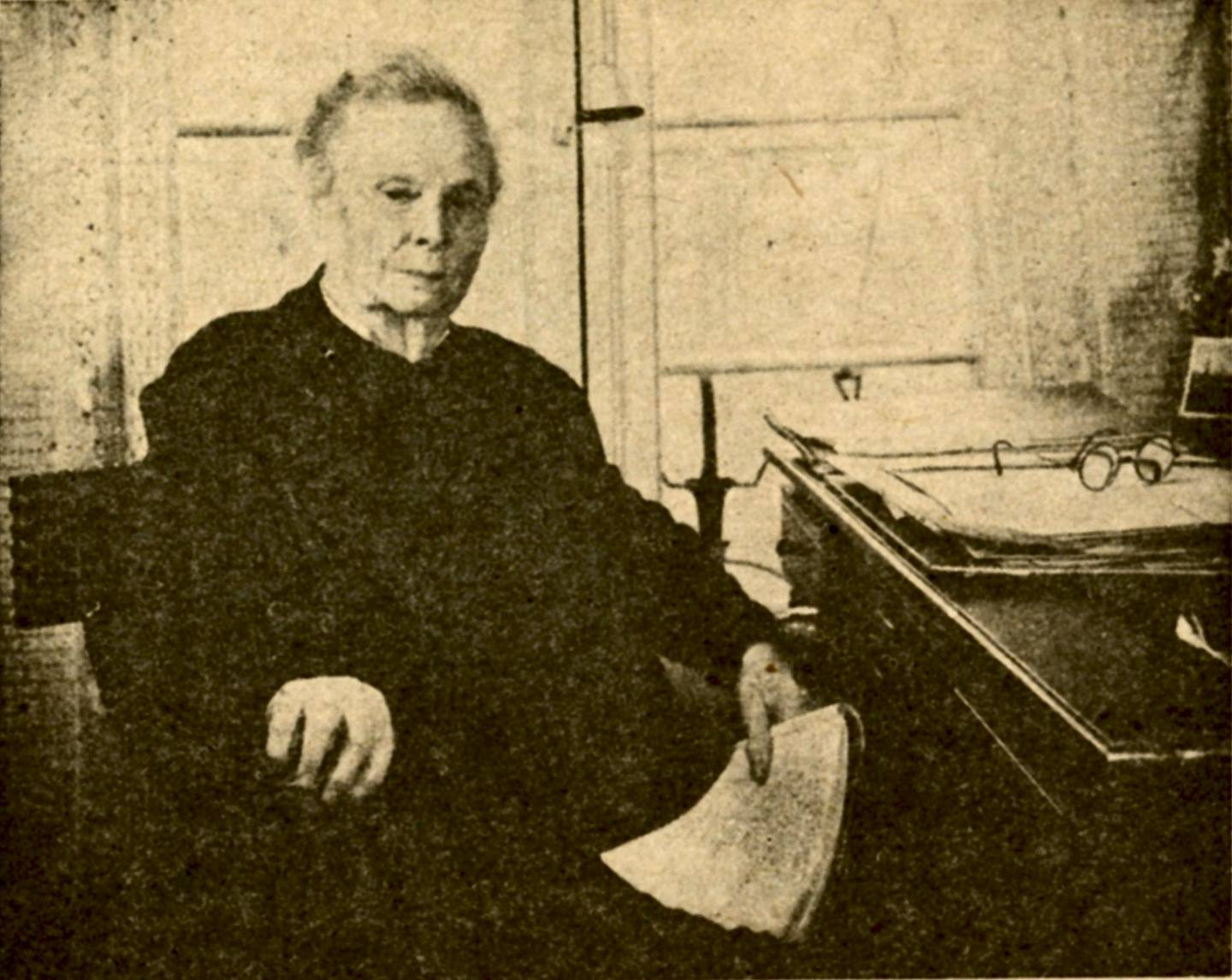
- Ida Moberg in 1945
- Born: Ida Georgina Moberg; 13 February 1859; Helsinki, Finland
- Died: 2 August 1947 (aged 88); Helsinki, Finland
- Occupation(s): Composer; Conductor

Ida Georgina Moberg (13 February 1859 – 2 August 1947) was a Finnish composer and conductor who particularly focused on choirs and orchestras. She was also heavily influenced by anthroposophy and theosophy, and was active in those circles in Finland.

== Early life and education ==
Ida Georgina Moberg was born on 13 February 1859 in Helsinki. Her father was an instrument maker. She attended the Svenska fruntimmersskolan i Helsingfors, an alternative Swedish-language girls' school from 1870 to 1877. Composer and teacher Anna Blomqvist worked at the school, and became a lifelong mentor of Moberg. She also studied with pianist Alie Lindberg and singer Marie Collan.

Between 1879 and 1883, Moberg received vocal training by Elizabeth Zwanziger and Friederike Grün at the Saint Petersburg Conservatory. However, she elected to stop her vocal training after experiencing physical issues with her voice, and later decided to focus on composition and conduction. She then studied counterpoint under Richard Faltin and composition at the Helsinki Philharmonic Society's Orchestra School under Jean Sibelius between 1893 and 1895 and Ilmari Krohn from 1900 to 1901. Moberg then studied composition from 1901 to 1905 under Felix Draeseke at Dresden Conservatory, before finishing her musical education at the Dalcroze Institute in Berlin, which she attended from 1911 to 1912.

== Career ==
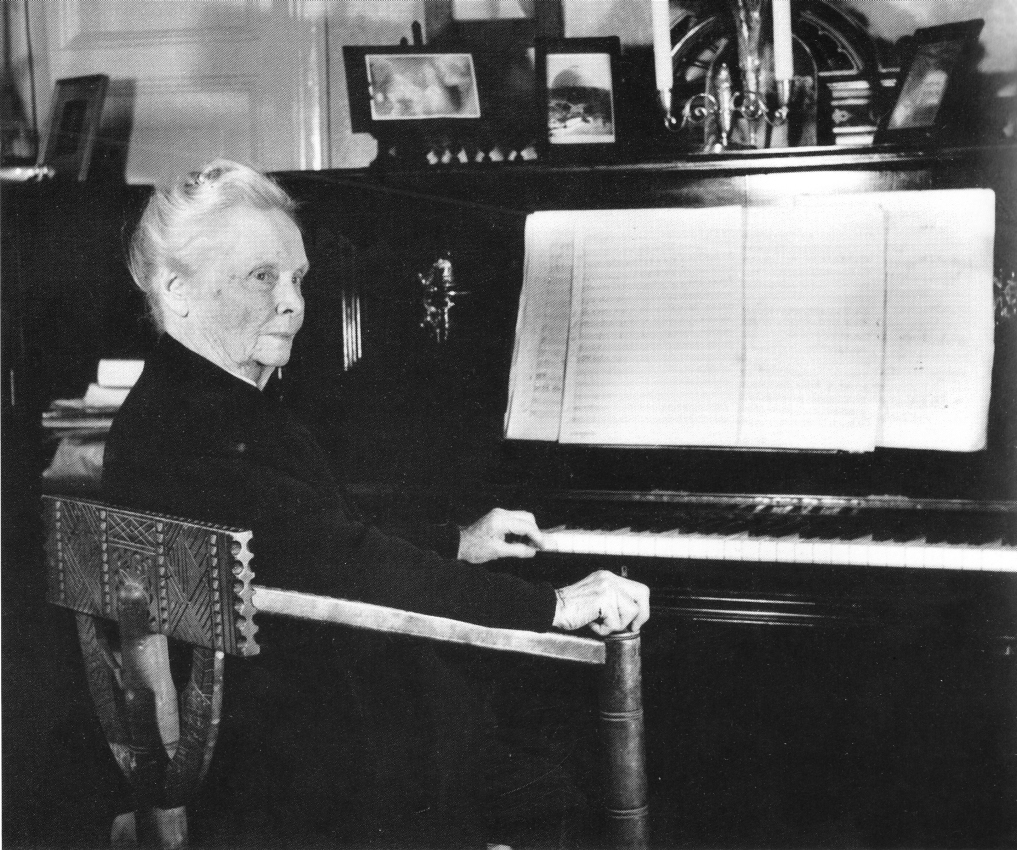
Ida Moberg

In 1906, Moberg wrote the symphony an Overture in A minor, Lantlig dans ("Country Dance") for orchestra and conducted it herself in the Great Hall of the University of Helsinki on 28 February 1906. The same year she composed Vaknen! (Awaken!) for both male chorus and orchestra, followed by Tyrannens natt ("The Night of the Tyrant") two years later for male chorus and orchestra.

After finishing her education, Moberg originally wanted to settle in Dresden, however due to the onset of World War I she returned to Helsinki, where she began teaching at the Helsinki Music Institute from 1914 to 1916. During her teaching career, Moberg is credited for bringing Dalcroze's body movement-based solfège that she learned during her studies in Berlin to Finland.

From 1910, Moberg began writing an opera based on The Buddha's life and the book The Light of Asia by Edwin Arnold. She continued working on it until her death however it was never published in its entirety, although, two extracts Balettikohtaus and Soluppgång, Hiljaisuus were performed as independent works.

== Death ==
Moberg died on 2 August 1947 in Helsinki, at the age of 88.

== Selected works ==
Title	Date	Instrumentation
Symphony	1905	Orchestra (lost)
Kalevala fantasy	n/a	Orchestra (lost)
Awaken / Vaknen!	1900?	Male choir and orchestra
Before the struggle / Före striden	n/a	Choir and strings
Life's struggle / Lifskamp	n/a	Male choir and orchestra
Amor mortis	n/a	Voice and organ
Asiens ljus	1910–1945	Opera (unfinished)
Ex Deo nascitur	n/a	Voice and organ (lost)
Night of the tyrant / Tyrannens natt	1909	Choir and strings
Sunrise, suite for orchestra	1909	Orchestra
Silence / Hiljaisuus	n/a	Orchestra
