= Edwin Lacierda =

Filipino lawyer, technology entrepreneur and former government official (born 1962)

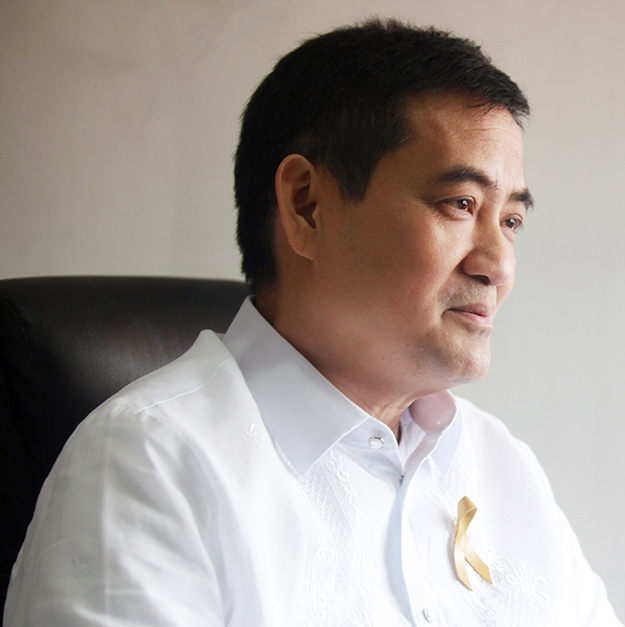

Presidential Spokesperson
- In office June 30, 2010 – June 30, 2016
- President: Benigno S. Aquino III
- Deputy: Abigail Valte
- Preceded by: Eduardo Ermita
- Succeeded by: Ernesto Abella

Personal details
- Born: May 8, 1962 (age 64)
- Party: Liberal Party
- Education: De La Salle University; Ateneo de Manila University; Asian Institute of Management
- Known for: PayMongo

Edwin Lacierda (Tagalog pronunciation: [lɐˈʃeɾda]; born May 8, 1962) is a Filipino lawyer, technology entrepreneur, and former government official. He was a member of the Philippine Cabinet and served as Presidential Spokesperson under President Benigno S. Aquino III. Lacierda is a co-founder of the fintech firm PayMongo.

== Early life and education ==
Lacierda was born into a Chinese Filipino family, with a Chinese father and a Filipino mother. He completed his secondary education at St. Jude Catholic School. He earned a Communication Arts degree from De La Salle University. He then pursued legal studies at the Ateneo de Manila University, where he obtained his LLB.

== Career ==
=== Legal practice and civil society ===
After completing law school, Lacierda began his career in private legal practice. He was a co-convener of the Black and White Movement, a civil society group that championed transparency and accountability in the Philippine government. Notably, he acted as legal counsel for whistleblower Rodolfo "Jun" Lozada during the Senate investigation into the NBN–ZTE controversy.

Lacierda also taught constitutional law at the Far Eastern University Institute of Law and at the Pamantasan ng Lungsod ng Maynila.

=== Role in government ===
Lacierda first gained national visibility as spokesperson for Benigno S. Aquino III during the 2010 presidential campaign. After Aquino’s election, he was appointed Presidential Spokesperson, a post he held from June 30, 2010 to June 30, 2016. In this capacity, he regularly briefed the media on executive policies and addressed issues involving governance, human rights, and foreign relations on behalf of the administration. He also responded to public concerns and clarified government positions during significant national events throughout Aquino’s term.

=== Technology entrepreneurship ===
After his public service, Lacierda co-founded PayMongo in 2019, a Philippine fintech and online payments platform where he was Chief Operating Officer (COO) until his departure in 2021.

He later co-founded another fintech venture, PayRex, where he is Chief Executive Officer (CEO).

=== Television hosting ===
In 2025, Lacierda also made his mark in broadcast media, co-hosting The Spokes on Bilyonaryo News Channel. He co-hosts with other former presidential spokespersons such as Trixie Cruz-Angeles, Hernani Braganza, and Margaux Salcedo. The program explores politics, governance, and current events, delivering thought-provoking conversations that challenge conventional perspectives.

== Personal life ==
Lacierda speaks four languages: Filipino, English, Hokkien, and Mandarin.

Political offices
Preceded by Eduardo Ermita	Presidential Spokesperson; 2010–2016	Succeeded by Ernesto Abella
