= Estela Padilla =

Estela Padilla is a Filipina Catholic theologian.

== Early life and education ==
Padilla has a Ph.D. in applied theology from De La Salle University and is currently studying for a combined MA and Ph.D. in organizational development at the Southeast Asia Interdisciplinary Development Institute. She also received her bachelor's degree in journalism from the University of the Philippines Diliman.

== Career ==
Padilla is one of the 70 non-bishops appointed to the 16th Ordinary General Assembly of the Synod of Bishops.

Padilla serves as the Executive Secretary of the Office of Theological Concerns at the Federation of Asian Bishops' Conferences and is a consultant for the CBCP's Commission on Basic Ecclesial Communities.
