= Cheloy Garafil =

Secretary General of the House of Representatives of the Philippines

The Honourable Attorney Cheloy V. Garafil MNSA
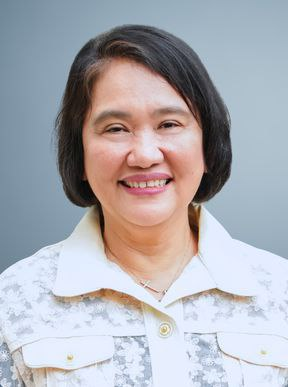
- Official portrait, 2025

Secretary General of the House of Representatives of the Philippines
- Incumbent
- Assumed office September 23, 2025
- Preceded by: Reginald Velasco

9th Philippine Representative to Taiwan
- In office October 1, 2024 – September 23, 2025
- President: Bongbong Marcos
- Preceded by: Silvestre Bello III
- Succeeded by: Corazon Padiernos (OIC)

Secretary of the Presidential Communications Office
- In office October 7, 2022 (Note: Served as Officer in Charge of the Presidential Communications Office from October 7, 2022 to January 10, 2023 and as interim secretary of the Presidential Communications Office from January 10, 2023 to March 16, 2023.) – September 5, 2024
- President: Bongbong Marcos
- Preceded by: Trixie Cruz-Angeles (Press Secretary)
- Succeeded by: Cesar Chavez (Acting)

Chairman of the Land Transportation Franchising and Regulatory Board
- In office June 30, 2022 – October 7, 2022
- President: Bongbong Marcos
- Preceded by: Martin Delgra III
- Succeeded by: Teofilo Guadiz III

Personal details
- Born: Pura, Tarlac, Philippines
- Education: University of Santo Tomas (BA, LL.B); National Defense College of the Philippines (MNSA)
- Occupation: Lawyer

Military service
- Allegiance: Philippines
- Branch/service: Philippine Air Force Reserve Command
- Rank: Lieutenant Colonel

Cheloy Velicaria-Garafil is a Filipino lawyer and former journalist currently serving as the secretary general of the House of Representatives of the Philippines since September 23, 2025.

She previously served as Chairperson and Resident Representative of the Manila Economic and Cultural Office from 2024 to 2025 and shortly served as the Secretary of the Presidential Communications Office until replaced by acting secretary Cesar Chavez.

== Education ==
Garafil attended the University of Santo Tomas (UST) where she graduated with a communication arts degree. She later pursued law studies in the same university, then passed the bar examination in 2003.

== Career ==
=== Journalism ===
Prior to working in the government, Garafil served as a reporter for the newspaper Malaya. She also worked for the Philippine Daily Globe and the Central News Agency (CNA) of Taiwan.

=== Government ===
Garafil worked as a prosecutor for the Department of Justice during the administration of President Gloria Macapagal Arroyo.

On October 7, 2022, Garafil resigned as chair of the Land Transportation Franchising and Regulatory Board (LTFRB) to assume the position of Officer in Charge of the Office of the Press Secretary. The office would later be reorganized as the Presidential Communications Office on December 29, 2022. She would lead the office under a regular capacity when she took oath as Press Secretary on January 10, 2023. Acting Secretary Cesar Chavez succeeded her on September 5, 2024. Garafil was subsequently appointed Chairperson and Resident Representative of the Manila Economic and Cultural Office, replacing Silvestre Bello III.

On September 23, 2025, Garafil was named as new secretary general of the House of Representatives of the Philippines, succeeding Reginald Velasco.

== International Recognition ==
On January 23, 2026, Garafil receives Order of Brilliant Star with Grand Cordon.

== Personal life ==
She is married to Eric Garafil, a former reporter from The Manila Times and The Manila Chronicle. They have two sons and a daughter.

Political offices
Preceded by Reginald Velasco	Secretary General of the House of Representatives of the Philippines; 2025–present	Incumbent
Preceded by Martin B. Delgra III	Chairman of the Land Transportation Franchising and Regulatory Board; 2022	Succeeded by Teofilo E. Guadiz III
Preceded by Trixie Cruz-Angeles as Press Secretary	Secretary of the Presidential Communications Office; 2022–2024	Succeeded by Cesar Chavez as Acting Secretary of the Presidential Communications Office
Diplomatic posts
Preceded by Silvestre Bello III	Representative of the Manila Economic and Cultural Office; 2024–2025	Succeeded by Corazon Padiernos as Officer-in-Charge of the Manila Economic and Cultural Office
