= Secretary General of the House of Representatives of the Philippines =

Elected officer of the House of Representatives of the Philippines

- Kalihim Panlahat ng Kapulungan ng mga Kinatawan ng Pilipinas
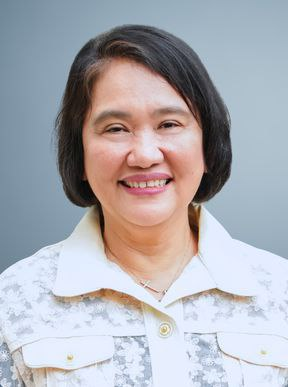
- Incumbent; Cheloy Garafil since September 23, 2025
- House of Representatives of the Philippines
- Style: The Honorable
- Seat: Batasang Pambansa Complex, Batasan Hills, Quezon City
- Appointer: Elected by the House of Representatives
- Formation: October 16, 1907
- First holder: Julian Gerona
- Deputy: Deputy Secretaries General of the House of Representatives of the Philippines
- Salary: ₱3,341,000 per year (2023)

The secretary general of the House of Representatives of the Philippines (Filipino: Kalihim Panlahat ng Kapulungan ng mga Kinatawan ng Pilipinas) is an officer of the House of Representatives of the Philippines. The secretary general—elected by a majority vote of all the Members at the commencement of each Congress—implements and enforces the orders and decisions of the House, maintains the Journal of each session and records all questions of order along with the corresponding rulings, oversees the printing and distribution of the House Records and submits all contracts and agreements for the Speaker’s approval. They serve as the custodian of all property, records, and government assets located within the premises of the House.

Under the House Speaker's supervision, the Secretary General acts as head of the House personnel and is responsible for ensuring the faithful and proper performance of their official duties.

The incumbent secretary general is Cheloy Garafil.

The secretary general presides over the convening of every Congress after a general election, until a Speaker is elected.

== Powers and duties ==
According to Rule VI, Section 18 of the Rules of the House of Representatives, the duties and powers of the Secretary General are:

- To call the session to order, to call the roll of Members by provinces, cities and municipalities comprising districts and by party-lists in alphabetical order, to designate an acting Floor Leader, to preserve order and decorum, and to decide all questions of order, as presiding officer pending the election of the Speaker, during the inaugural session of the House;
  - To prepare the Order of Business for the inaugural session of the House which shall include:
  - a Resolution informing the President of the Philippines that the House of Representatives has been organized and has elected its Speaker, Deputy Speakers, Secretary General and Sergeant-at-Arms;
  - a Resolution informing the Senate of the Philippines that the House of Representatives has been organized and has elected its Speaker, Deputy Speakers, Secretary General and Sergeant-at-Arms;
  - a Concurrent Resolution of the House of Representatives and the Senate of the Philippines providing for a joint session to hear the State of the Nation Address of the President of the Philippines; and
  - a Concurrent Resolution authorizing the appointment of a joint committee of both Houses to inform the President of the Philippines that Congress, in joint session, is ready to receive the President for the State of the Nation Address;
- To enforce orders and decisions of the House;
- To prepare and distribute copies of the Order of Business of the House to all Members;
- e. to attend, personally or through representative, all sessions of the House, call the roll of the Members and read bills, resolutions, messages, communications, memorials, petitions and other documents which should be reported to the House or the reading of which is required by the House or the Speaker;
- To note all questions of order and the decisions thereon, the records of which shall be printed at the close of each session for the use of the Members as appendix to the Journal of such session;
- To keep, certify and distribute to the Members the Journal of each session which shall be a clear and succinct account of the business conducted and actions taken by the House: Provided, That Journals of executive sessions shall be recorded in a separate book and kept confidential;
- To provide the House with information on approved bills to be transmitted to the President for action;
- To distribute to Members, within six (6) months after the close of a regular session, copies of the Record of the House for a regular session and the acts and resolutions passed and adopted during the same;
- To make available on the House website within six (6) months after the close of every regular session, the Record of the House;
- To distribute to Members, at the commencement of every regular session, a list of the reports submitted to the House by each head of department of the Executive and Judicial Departments;
- To procure and retain sufficient copies of books, records and documents for the use of the Members and the officers of the House in the library of the House and in the office of the Secretary General;
- To attest to and affix the seal of the House on all writs, warrants and subpoenae issued by or upon order of the House or the Speaker;
- To certify and affix the seal of the House on all approved measures, orders, acts and resolutions
- To submit to the Speaker all contracts and agreements for approval;
- To ensure that the employees of the House perform their duties competently, efficiently and effectively, and in furtherance thereof, to impose necessary disciplinary measures and recommend dismissal of erring employees to the Speaker in accordance with Civil Service rules, and to recommend to the Speaker policies and programs on recruitment and hiring of competent professionals, the improvement of the capabilities of House personnel to provide needed technical and other support services to the Members, and the acquisition, improvement and upgrading of necessary facilities and equipment;
- To appoint personnel of the House when authorized by the Speaker;
- To serve as custodian of the property and records of the House and all government property within the House premises, and to make an inventory of all these property and records at the beginning and end of each regular session;
- To cause the publication of the attendance record of Members in sessions of the House and their voting records on bills of national application in accordance with rules and regulations to be issued by the House; and
- To perform other duties that may be assigned or ordered by the House or by the Speaker.

== Secretaries General of the House of Representatives ==
=== Malolos Congress (1898–1899) ===
Portrait	Name	Term start	Term end	Legislature	Refs.
	Gregorio S. Araneta	September 15, 1898	November 13, 1899	Malolos Congress	
	Pablo Ocampo	September 15, 1898	November 13, 1899	Malolos Congress	

=== Philippine Assembly (1907–1916) ===
Portrait	Name	Term start	Term end	Legislature	Refs.
	Julian Gerona	October 16, 1907	1910	1st Legislature	
	Manuel Gavieres; Acting	March 28, 1910	1910	2nd Legislature	
	Gregorio Nieva; Acting	April 7, 1910	1910	2nd Legislature	
	Ramon Diokno	October 31, 1910	1912	2nd Legislature	
	Teodoro Kalaw	October 16, 1912	1912	3rd Legislature	

=== House of Representatives (1916–1935) ===
Portrait	Name	Term start	Term end	Legislature	Refs.
	Rafael Villanueva	October 16, 1916	1919	4th Legislature	
	Rafael Palma	1919	1922	5th Legislature	
	Narciso Pimentel; Acting	October 27, 1922	1923	6th Legislature	
	Feliciano Gomez	March 26, 1923	1923	6th Legislature	
	Ricardo Gonzalez Lloret	July 16, 1925	1928	7th Legislature	
	Ricardo Gonzalez Lloret	July 16, 1925	1928	8th Legislature	
	Narciso Pimentel	July 16, 1928	1933	8th Legislature	
	Narciso Pimentel	July 16, 1928	1933	9th Legislature	
	Julian Lao	January 1934	1934	9th Legislature	
	Eulogio Benitez	1934	November 15, 1935	9th Legislature	
	Eulogio Benitez	1934	November 15, 1935	10th Legislature	

=== National Assembly (1935–1944) ===
Portrait	Name	Term start	Term end	Legislature	Refs.
	Narciso Pimentel	November 25, 1935	December 30, 1941	1st National Assembly	
	Narciso Pimentel	November 25, 1935	December 30, 1941	2nd National Assembly	
	Narciso Pimentel	September 25, 1943	February 2, 1944	National Assembly (Second Republic)	

=== House of Representatives (1945–1973) ===
Portrait	Name	Term start	Term end	Legislature	Refs.
	Narciso Pimentel	June 9, 1945	February 3, 1953	1st Commonwealth Congress	
	Narciso Pimentel	June 9, 1945	February 3, 1953	2nd Commonwealth Congress	
	Narciso Pimentel	June 9, 1945	February 3, 1953	1st Congress	
	Narciso Pimentel	June 9, 1945	February 3, 1953	2nd Congress	
	Inocencio Pareja; Acting	February 4, 1953	May 18, 1953	2nd Congress	
	Narciso Pimentel	May 19, 1953	August 11, 1957	3rd Congress	
	Inocencio Pareja; Acting	August 12, 1957	January 26, 1958	3rd Congress	
	Inocencio Pareja	January 27, 1958	September 23, 1972	4th Congress	
	Inocencio Pareja	January 27, 1958	September 23, 1972	5th Congress	
	Inocencio Pareja	January 27, 1958	September 23, 1972	6th Congress	
	Inocencio Pareja	January 27, 1958	September 23, 1972	7th Congress	

=== Batasang Pambansa (1978–1986) ===
Portrait	Name	Term start	Term end	Legislature	Refs.
	Antonio de Guzman	June 12, 1978	March 25, 1986	Interim Batasang Pambansa	
	Antonio de Guzman	June 12, 1978	March 25, 1986	Regular Batasang Pambansa	

=== House of Representatives (1987–present) ===
Portrait	Name	Term start	Term end	Legislature	Refs.
	Quirino Abad Santos Jr.	July 27, 1987	July 26, 1992	8th Congress	
	Camilo Sabio	July 27, 1992	July 1996	9th Congress	
	Camilo Sabio	July 27, 1992	July 1996	10th Congress	
	Roberto Nazareno	July 1996	February 2008	10th Congress	
	Roberto Nazareno	July 1996	February 2008	11th Congress	
	Roberto Nazareno	July 1996	February 2008	12th Congress	
	Roberto Nazareno	July 1996	February 2008	13th Congress	
	Roberto Nazareno	July 1996	February 2008	14th Congress	
	Marilyn Barua-Yap	February 2008	July 25, 2016	14th Congress	
	Marilyn Barua-Yap	February 2008	July 25, 2016	15th Congress	
	Marilyn Barua-Yap	February 2008	July 25, 2016	16th Congress	
	Cesar Pareja	July 25, 2016	July 30, 2018	17th Congress	
	Dante Roberto Maling; Acting	July 30, 2018	July 22, 2019	17th Congress	
	Jose Luis Montales	July 22, 2019	October 12, 2020	18th Congress	
	Jocelia Bighani Sipin	October 12, 2020	November 18, 2020	18th Congress	
	Mark Llandro Mendoza	November 18, 2020	July 25, 2022	18th Congress	
	Reginald Velasco	July 25, 2022	September 23, 2025	19th Congress	
	Reginald Velasco	July 25, 2022	September 23, 2025	20th Congress	
	Cheloy Garafil	September 23, 2025	present	20th Congress	

== See also ==
- Secretary of the Senate of the Philippines
