= Southeast Asia Interdisciplinary Development Institute =

Private college in Rizal, Philippines

Southeast Asia Interdisciplinary Development Institute (SAIDI)
- Type: Research University
- Established: 1965
- Chairman: Eligio Ma. P. Santos, Ph.D.
- President: Eliseo A. Aurellado, Ph.D.
- Dean: Maria Victoria R. Castillo, Ph.D.
- Location: SAIDI Formation Center, Taktak Drive, Antipolo, Rizal Province, 1870 Philippines
- Website: www.saidi.edu.ph

The Southeast Asia Interdisciplinary Development Institute Graduate School of Organization Development and Planning, also known as the SAIDI Graduate School of OD&P, or simply SAIDI, is a graduate school in Antipolo, Rizal Province, Philippines.

== History ==
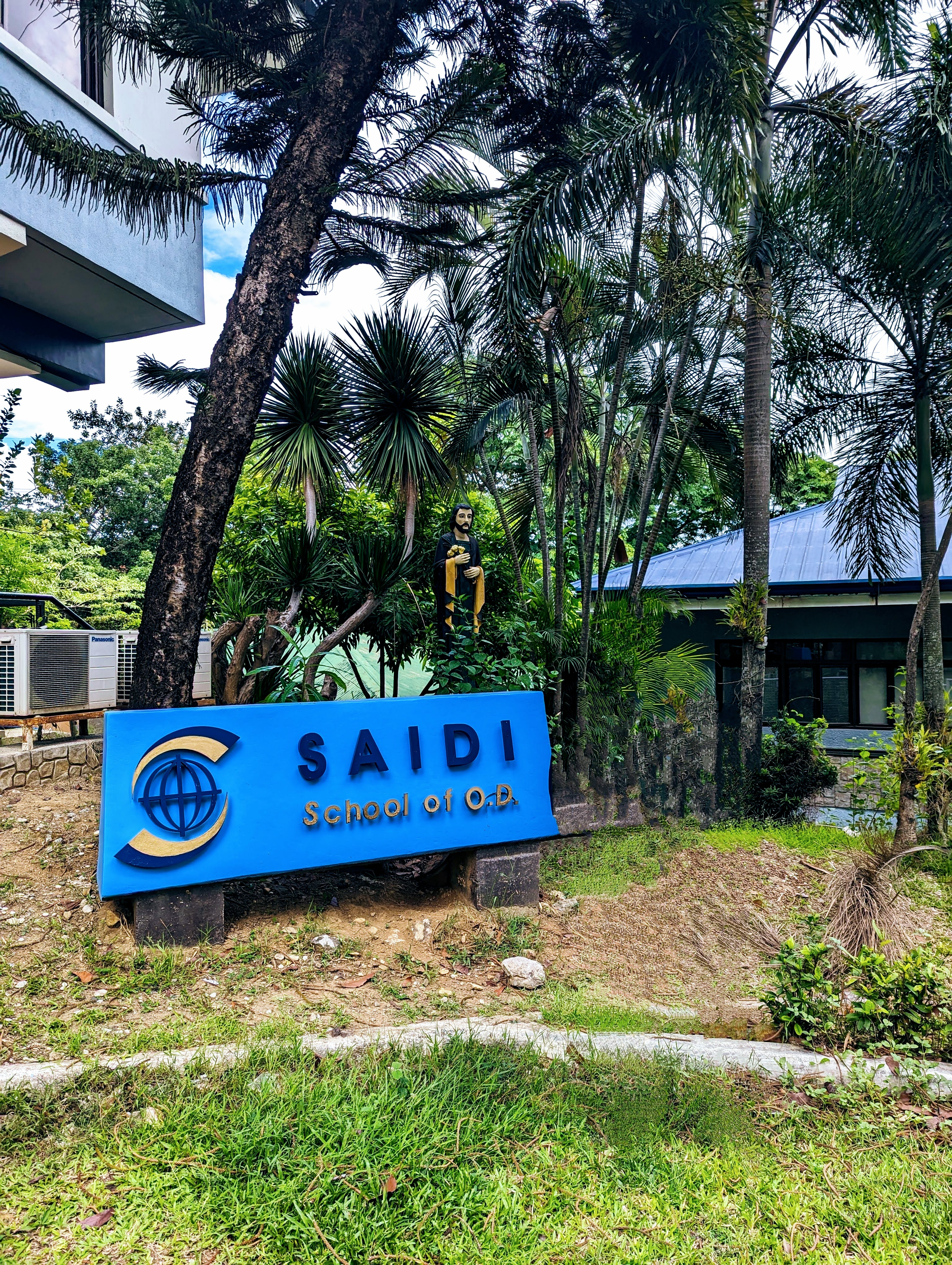
SAIDI Campus

In 1965, the Summer Educational Media Institute (SEMI) opened as a specialized program in educational media and technology for educators all over the Philippines. Masteral and doctoral students from the Ateneo de Manila University, the University of Santo Tomas, and Philippine Christian University became the first learners of educational media and technology at SEMI.

In 1972, Sr. Jacqueline E. Blondin, MIC, the founding director of SEMI, made the decision to redirect SEMI's focus from education to organization development. In this newly proposed program, systems theory, previously used as a foundational principle for instruction development, was adapted for organizational applications.

In September 1975, SAIDI School of OD began accepting students from Southeast Asia and introduced two master's programs that followed the "Open Learning Philosophy". This approach utilized a blend of print modules, oral instruction, and electronic technology. In 1976, the Ministry of Education recommended SAIDI to offer a postgraduate degree program in education.

For its initial eight years, SAIDI was located in Arzobispo, Real, and General Luna Streets in Intramuros, Manila. However, in June 1983, the school moved to Antipolo in the province of Rizal.

== Student population ==
From 1978 to 2004, SAIDI enrollees amounted to 572, broken down as follows: 35 enrollees in 2004; 282 from 1994 to 2003; and 255 from 1978 to 1993. Currently, there are 324 Ph.D. students, 81 MA/Ph.D. combined students, and 167 MA students.

== Academic programs ==
SAIDI offers the following graduate degree programs:

- Doctor of Philosophy in Organization Development and Planning
- Master of Arts-Doctor of Philosophy in Organization Development and Planning
- Master of Arts in Organization Development and Planning
- Master of Arts in Instructional Development and Technology

== Notable alumni ==
Notable Southeast Asia Interdisciplinary Development Institute alumni

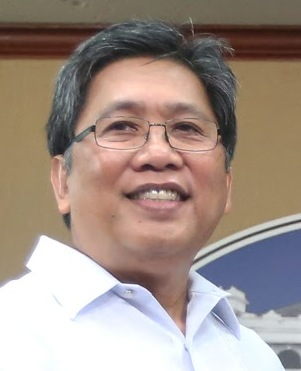
Herminio Coloma Jr., businessman and educator

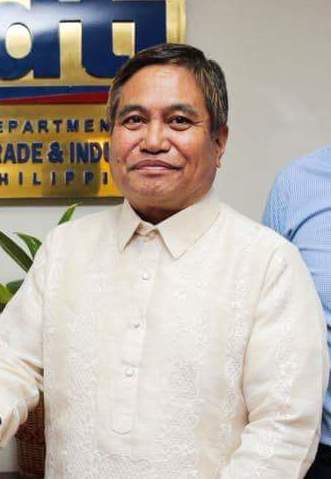
Jaime Aristotle Alip, social entrepreneur

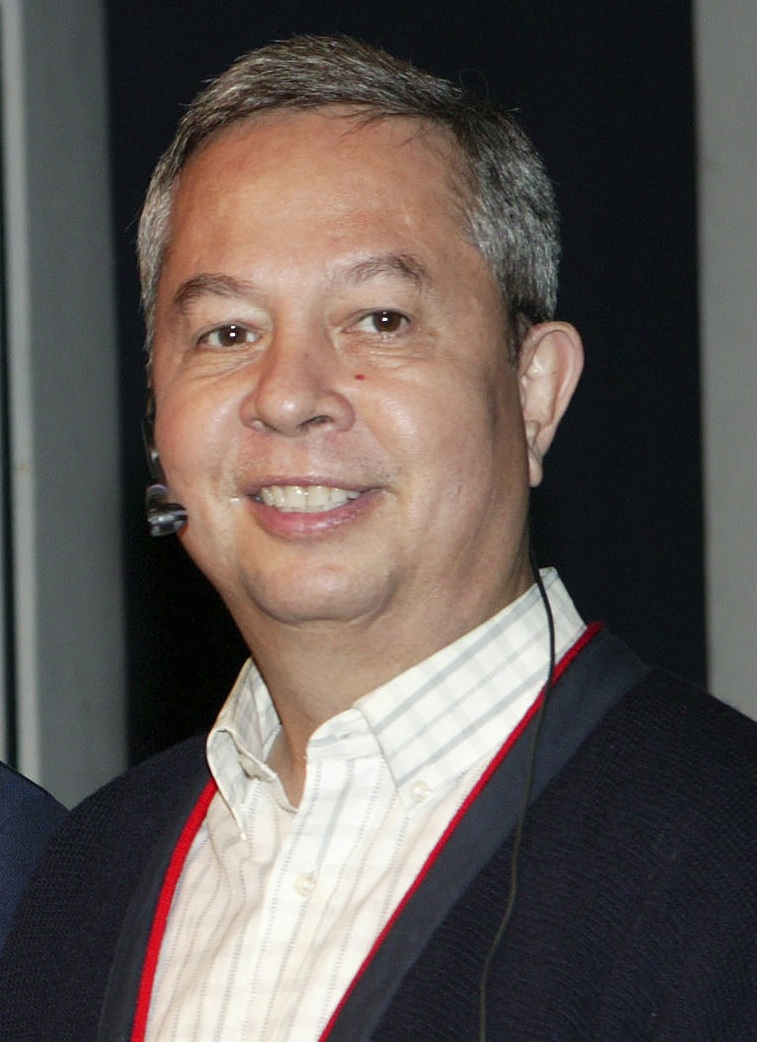
Nicanor Perlas, activist
- Estela Padilla, theologian
- Nicanor Perlas, activist
- Herminio Coloma Jr., businessman and educator
- Jaime Aristotle Alip, social entrepreneur
- Chin-Chin Gutierrez, actress
- Gilbert Garcera, Roman Catholic Archbishop of the Archdiocese of Lipa
