= Alie =

Alie is a given name. Notable people with the name include:

- Alie Badara Mansaray, Sierra Leonean government administrator
- Alie Boorsma (born 1959), Dutch speed skater
- Alie Israel (born 1983), American track runner
- Alie Lindberg (1849–1933), Finnish pianist
- Alie te Riet (born 1953), Dutch breaststroke swimmer
- Alie Sesay (born 1993), English-Sierra Leonean footballer
- Alie Stijl (1923–1999), Dutch swimmer
- Alie Ward (born 1976), American writer
