= Martin Andanar =

Filipino television personality and broadcaster (born 1974)

Martín Andanar
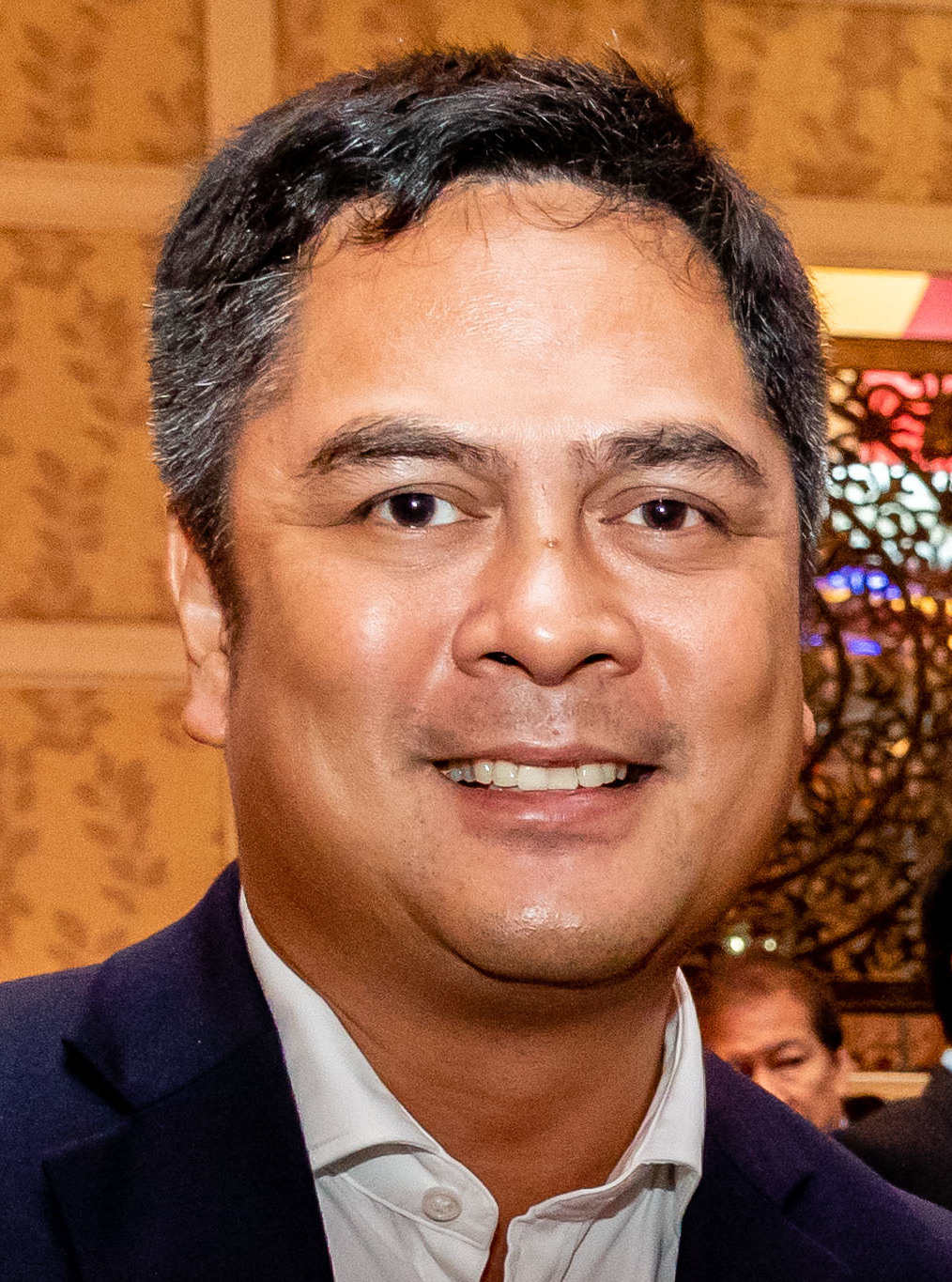
- Andanar in 2018

Secretary of the Presidential Communications Operations Office
- In office June 30, 2016 – June 30, 2022
- President: Rodrigo Duterte
- Preceded by: Herminio Coloma Jr.
- Succeeded by: Trixie Cruz-Angeles (Press Secretary)

Presidential Spokesperson
- Acting
- In office March 8, 2022 – June 30, 2022
- President: Rodrigo Duterte
- Preceded by: Karlo Nograles (acting)
- Succeeded by: Trixie Cruz-Angeles (Press Secretary)

IATF-EID Spokesperson
- In office March 8, 2022 – June 30, 2022
- Preceded by: Karlo Nograles (acting)
- Succeeded by: Position abolished

Personal details
- Born: José Ruperto Martín Marfori Andanar; August 21, 1974 (age 52)
- Party: Independent (2019–present)
- Other political affiliations: PDP–Laban (2018–2019)
- Spouse: Alelee C. Aguilar (m. 2005)
- Children: 2
- Education: Federation University Australia (BA); Asian Institute of Management (M.E)
- Occupation: Broadcast journalist, government official

Jose Ruperto Martin Marfori Andanar (born August 21, 1974) is a Filipino television news personality, news anchor, radio commentator, podcaster, voice-over artist, columnist, and a barista. He served as the former secretary of the Presidential Communications Office of the Philippines under the Duterte administration.

Andanar was the former head of News5 Everywhere, the online news video and audio portal of TV5 Network, anchored several newscasts of TV5, Radyo5 92.3 News FM and AksyonTV, sister stations of TV5 Network. He was also a voice-over talent of News5.

In June 2016, it was announced that Andanar would be joining the administration of President Rodrigo Duterte as the secretary of the Presidential Communications Operations Office, replacing Sonny Coloma. He was tasked with supervising both the operations of the government's news and information agencies.

In March 2022, Andanar was named acting presidential spokesperson after former Cabinet Secretary Karlo Nograles was appointed as chairperson of the Civil Service Commission.

== Early life and education ==
Jose Ruperto Martin Marfori Andanar was born on August 21, 1974. Martin Andanar spent his high school years in Cagayan de Oro at Xavier University - Ateneo de Cagayan and Manila. After a year in University of the Philippines-Los Baños, he moved to Australia with his mother, where he graduated with a Bachelor of Arts in Social and Political Studies & Film and Media Studies at Federation University.

Andanar completed his Master in Entrepreneurship at the Asian Institute of Management in 2007.

In 2008, along with 30 Tagalog youth leaders, the US State Department sent Andanar to Northern Illinois University for an International Visitors Leadership Fellowship Program. In June 2009, he went to Georgetown University in Washington, DC to attend an executive course in Public & Non Profit Management. He also completed a Senior Executive Fellows Program at the Harvard Kennedy School, Harvard University in March 2010.

== Broadcasting career (1998–present) ==
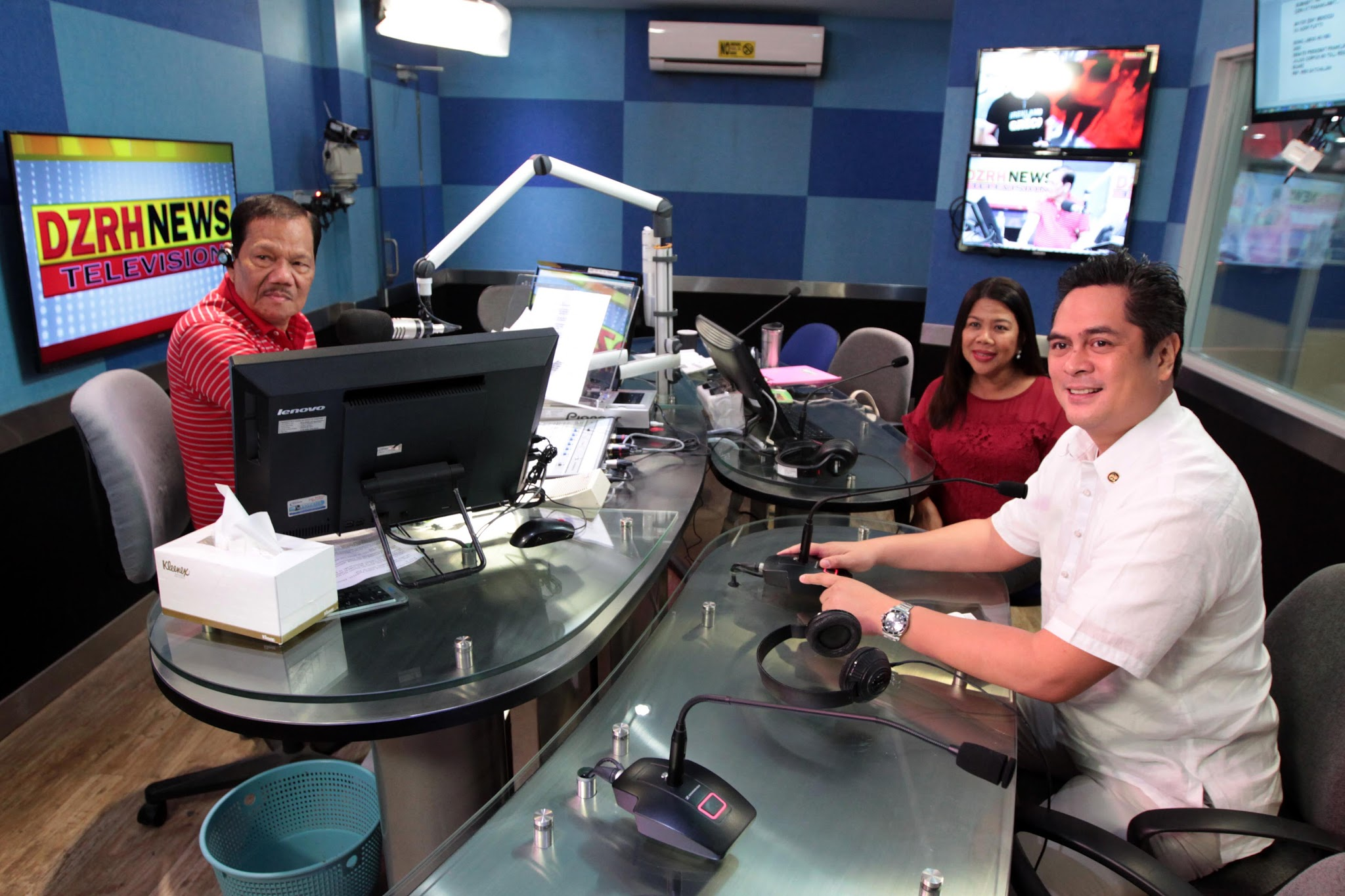
PCOO secretary Martin Andanar (right) shares light moments with DZRH radio program hosts Joe Taruc and Milky Rigonan on July 15, 2016.

Andanar hosted the documentary and public affairs shows such as S.O.S.: Stories of Survival (2005–2008),

=== Official news voice image artist of TV5, Aksyon TV, and Radyo5 ===
He started as the news voice image artist of Aksyon TV and Radyo5 when he joined TV5 in 2009.

=== Champion and head of TV5 News digital video and audio portal "News5 Everywhere" ===
Through his leadership, TV5 became the first news channel to establish digital presence for news delivery through the news digital video and audio portal “News5 Everywhere”.

=== Radyo5 and Aksyon TV image copywriter ===
Andanar was a Radyo5 and Aksyon TV image copywriter.

=== Creator of Balut Radio ===
Andanar was the creator of the defunct Balut Radio.

=== Creator of Martin's Mancave ===
The podcast was created out of Andanar's hobby for radio and podcast. It started as a program to interview known personalities who are adept at certain topics, such as politics, arts, technology and education. In its latter days, the podcast was used as an extended arm of PCOO's Laging Handa Communications for the COVID-19 pandemic. It had broad discussions on the government's thrusts to mitigate the health crisis. and Mediaman's Mancave Podcasts.

=== CGTN ===
In 2023, Andanar moved to Beijing, China to work as a news anchor China Global Television Network (CGTN).

=== RainbowTV ===
In 2026, Andanar Moved to FBS Radio Network to work as a News Anchor RainbowTV”s BIO X.P.

== Government career (2016–2022) ==
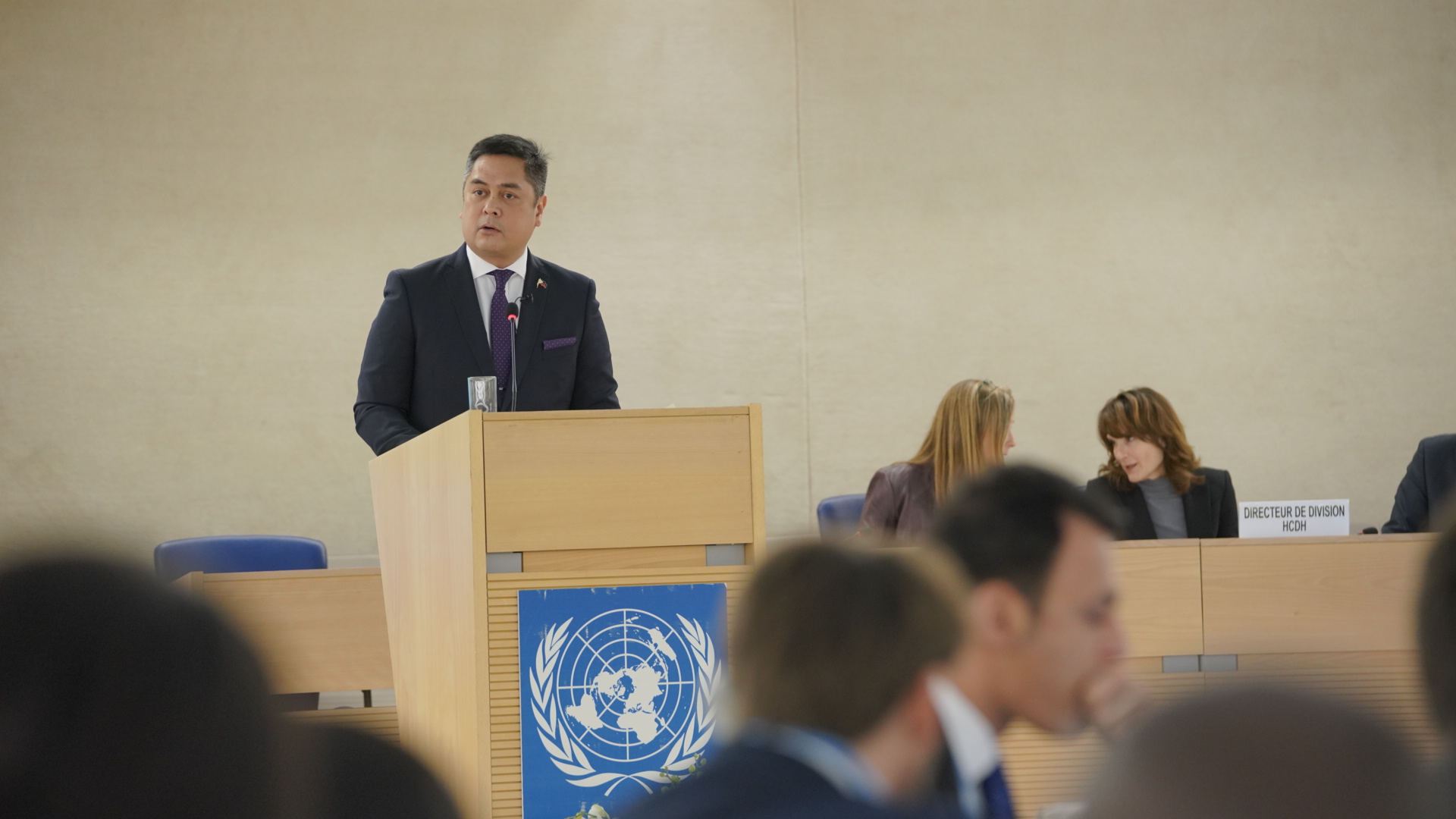
Andanar at the United Nations

Andanar was appointed as secretary for the Presidential Communications Operations Office by President Rodrigo Duterte on June 30, 2016. The Commission on Appointments confirmed his appointment on October 12, 2016.

As PCOO secretary, Andanar spearheaded the formulation of a national communications strategy that focused the rehabilitation of existing government media and communications resources, and the development of new platforms for communicating and engaging with the public.

Among the reforms made were the use of fiber optic Internet connection and a new website design, leading to higher visits. The PNA also established a three-layer editorial process to ensure the quality of content. Andanar's efforts to revitalize government media services earned the adulation of Senator JV Ejercito.

In July 2017, the Philippine Star published an article that found Andanar to be "richest official in his agency with a net worth higher than that of all his undersecretaries and assistant secretaries combined", Andanar declared a net worth of P152.27 million in his statement of assets, liabilities and net worth (SALN) submitted April 2017.

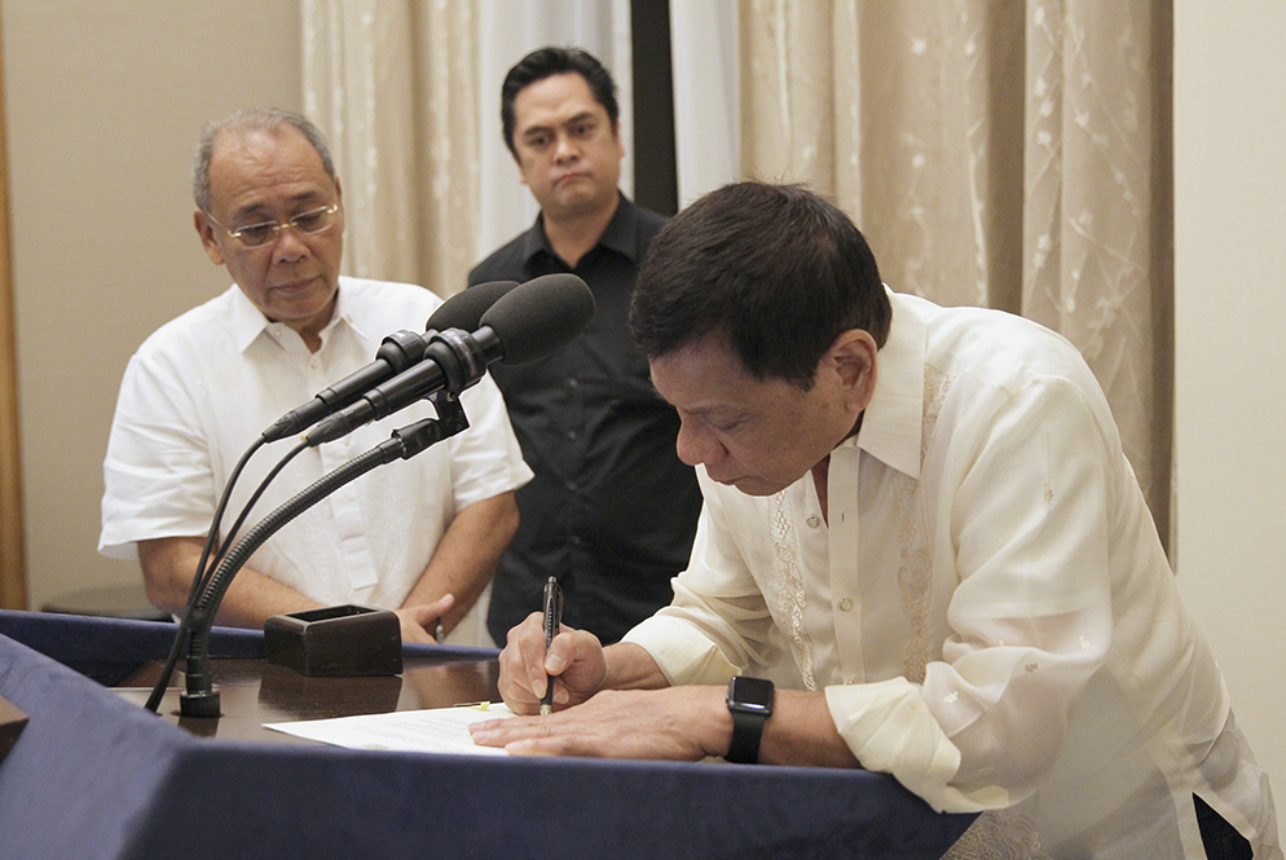
Former spokesperson Ernesto Abella and PCOO secretary Martin Andanar while President Rodrigo Duterte signs Executive Order No. 2, operationalizing the freedom of information in the executive branch

=== Freedom of Information ===
PCOO secretary Martin Andanar championed the landmark freedom of information (FOI) policy of the government, which was made effective under Executive Order No. 2 signed in 2016.

=== Presidential Task Force on Media Security ===
Andanar also supervises the Presidential Task Force on Media Security (PTFoMS), which was formed in October 2016 after President Duterte asked for the creation of a special agency to protect media workers. As part of the agency's efforts, Andanar in 2018 presented the Kapisanan ng mga Brodkaster ng Pilipinas (KBP) with the Handbook on Personal Security Measures for Media Practitioners, a document that outlines how media workers may enlist government protection services against threats to their life and security. In December 2018, the PTFoMS filed murder charges against suspects in the killing of Albay radio personality Joey Llana, who was killed in June the same year. Reporters Without Borders also delisted the Philippines from its list of most dangerous countries for journalists in December 2018, which Andanar attributed to President Duterte's concern for journalists. The task force's creation and Andanar's efforts in managing it received praise from European Union (EU) Ambassador to the Philippines Franz Jessen.

In 2020, the Philippines has finally been out of the top five worst countries for journalists and was declared the “biggest mover” after moving to seventh place in the Committee to Protect Journalists' (CPJ) Global Impunity Index (GII) report published on October 28. The CPJ report was welcomed further by PTFoMS, under the supervision of Andanar as "an incontrovertible demonstration and validation of the government's unfeigned dedication to safeguarding press freedom and protecting the life, liberty and security of media workers in the country amid huge challenges."

=== Dutertenomics ===
Dutertenomics is one of the flagship communication programs of the PCOO. It refers to the socioeconomic policies of President Duterte, which includes the development of infrastructure and industries. It was launched on April 18, 2017, by the Department of Finance (DOF) and the Presidential Communications Operations Office (PCOO) in a forum attended by local and international media, with discussions focused on President Duterte's 10-point socioeconomic reform agenda and its primary objective of accelerating poverty reduction and transforming the Philippines into a high middle-income economy by 2022.

It has since been replicated in similar communications roadshows in Cambodia during the 2017 World Economic Forum on the Association of Southeast Asian Nations, and at the sidelines of the 2017 One Belt One Road Forum for International Cooperation in Beijing, China.

=== Interim Social Media Practitioner Accreditation ===
On August 8, 2017, Andanar signed department order no. 15 entitled “Interim Social Media Practitioner Accreditation.” The department order stipulates that before social media publishers and bloggers could cover presidential and Malacañang events, they should be at least 18 years old with at least 5,000 followers to cover President Duterte. Andanar states that this order would enforce responsible journalism ethics on those who publish on social media and the bloggers.

=== Government Satellite Network ===
Andanar spearheaded creation of the Government Satellite Network (GSN), which can transmit “video, image, audio and data content,” and provide “two way or multiple 4k tele-conference communication, internet delivery capability and multiple tv channels,” throughout the Philippines islands using advanced satellite and IPTV technology. Andanar also announced that the People's Television Network Inc. (PTNI) will have increased transmission capacity to reach far-off areas with the help of the Integrated Services Digital Broadcast – Terrestrial (ISDB-T) system from Japan. He also said that 2023 is the target for switch-off of all analog broadcasts in the country.

=== Emergency Warning Broadcast System ===
The Emergency Warning Broadcast System (EWBS) is the first-ever early civil defense warning system for natural disasters in the Philippines, implemented on March 10, 2018. According to Andanar, the EWBS will utilize the government's broadcast channel, PTV to provide early warning during times of disasters. As well as providing updates on relief efforts to the affected communities.

=== Provincial Communications Officers’ Network ===
The Provincial Communications Officers Network (PCO Net) is a project of the Presidential Communications Operations Office under Secretary Martin Andanar to “ensure a coherent and efficient flow of information particularly from the Office of the President down to the national government agencies (NGAs), local government units (LGUs) and academe“ by providing a platform where provincial information officers can access information direct from Malacañan and distributed to their respective localities

The PCO Net also served as the foundation for the first National Information Convention (NIC), a gathering of one thousand five hundred government information officers, as well as “experts in the communication field, both government and non-government, digital and traditional.“ The three-day event was held from February 19 to 21 in Davao City. The convention is part of the PCOO's effort to give people a better appreciation and understanding of government programs and mechanisms so that “they can better participate in nation-building and development, acquire insights on best practices in public advocacy and social mobilization, and improve public-private partnership in development communication.”

=== Meeting with Maguindanao Massacre Survivors ===
In November 2018, Andanar and PCOO Undersecretary Joel Egco met with survivors of victims of the Maguindanao massacre, including clan leader Esmael Mangudadatu, and told them that a guilty verdict against suspects is expected to be served in early 2019. Andanar and his staff also visited the site of the massacre itself, and is the first ever Presidential Communications Secretary to visit the massacre memorial.

=== Office of the Global Media Affairs ===
Under Andanar, the PCOO created the Office of Global Media Affairs in November 2018 in order to help bridge Philippine government media with the international community. The OGMA addresses the concerns or questions of foreign correspondents not in the Philippines and in other parts of the world. Andanar says the agency will form a press attaché division, members of which will be sent to other countries as Philippine government media representatives. The PCOO also has an International Press Center that accredits foreign journalists covering the Philippines.

=== Partnership with Myanmar ===
The Philippine and Myanma governments in January 2019 signed a memorandum of understanding (MOU) to establish stronger mechanisms for information sharing and media cooperation. Andanar said both countries can promote culture, arts, education, tourism or "anything that will benefit the two states" through information sharing.

=== Public Briefing: #LagingHanda PH ===
Andanar anchored Public Briefing: #LagingHandaPH, a press briefing for the COVID-19 pandemic in the Philippines produced by PCOO and aired on PTV, RPN/CNN Philippines, IBC, Radyo Pilipinas 1 and other radio and television stations across the Philippines.

=== Network Briefing News ===
The Network Briefing News was created at the height of the pandemic, bridging local government units nationwide to the national government. Through the program, local chief executives are able to report the initiatives they have undertaken in protecting their respective communities against the spread of the COVID-19. They are also able to request for additional support to the national government, which are directly responded to by concerned government agencies.

=== UN Speech ===
Secretary Andanar delivered the Philippine dignitary statement at the High-Level Segment of the 43rd Session of the Human Rights Council on February 26, 2020, that highlighted the Duterte administration's policy on media freedom and human rights. “We repeat the call for prudence in assessing claims particularly from sources who have enjoyed the hallowed status of human rights defenders while waging the longest insurgency in Asia and terrorizing communities in the Philippines,” said Secretary Andanar, who is the first Philippine Communications Secretary to speak before the Human Rights Council.

=== Duterte Legacy ===
The Duterte Legacy is PCOO's communication campaign showcasing how the lives of Filipinos were impacted and affected by the programs and projects of the Duterte Administration as it provides government services to ensure that the Filipinos' lives become better and healthier. It "centers on the accomplishments of the key three pillars of the president's legacy, which are peace and order, infrastructure and development, and poverty alleviation," according to Secretary Andanar.

News website Vera Files found materials used for the campaign to be apparently misleading, "some of the claims were indeed true, many lacked proper context, while others were either misleading or inaccurate."

=== Media Workers' Welfare Bill ===
In January 2021, around 218 congressmen voted in favor of the passage of House Bill 8140 or the proposed Media Workers’ Welfare on its third and final reading at the House of Representatives.

The HB 8140, authored by ACT- CIS Representative Niña Taduran, aims to provide enhanced protection, security, and benefits for media workers, to which PCOO has been among different agencies who have been pushing for its swift passage in congress.

=== International Cooperation ===
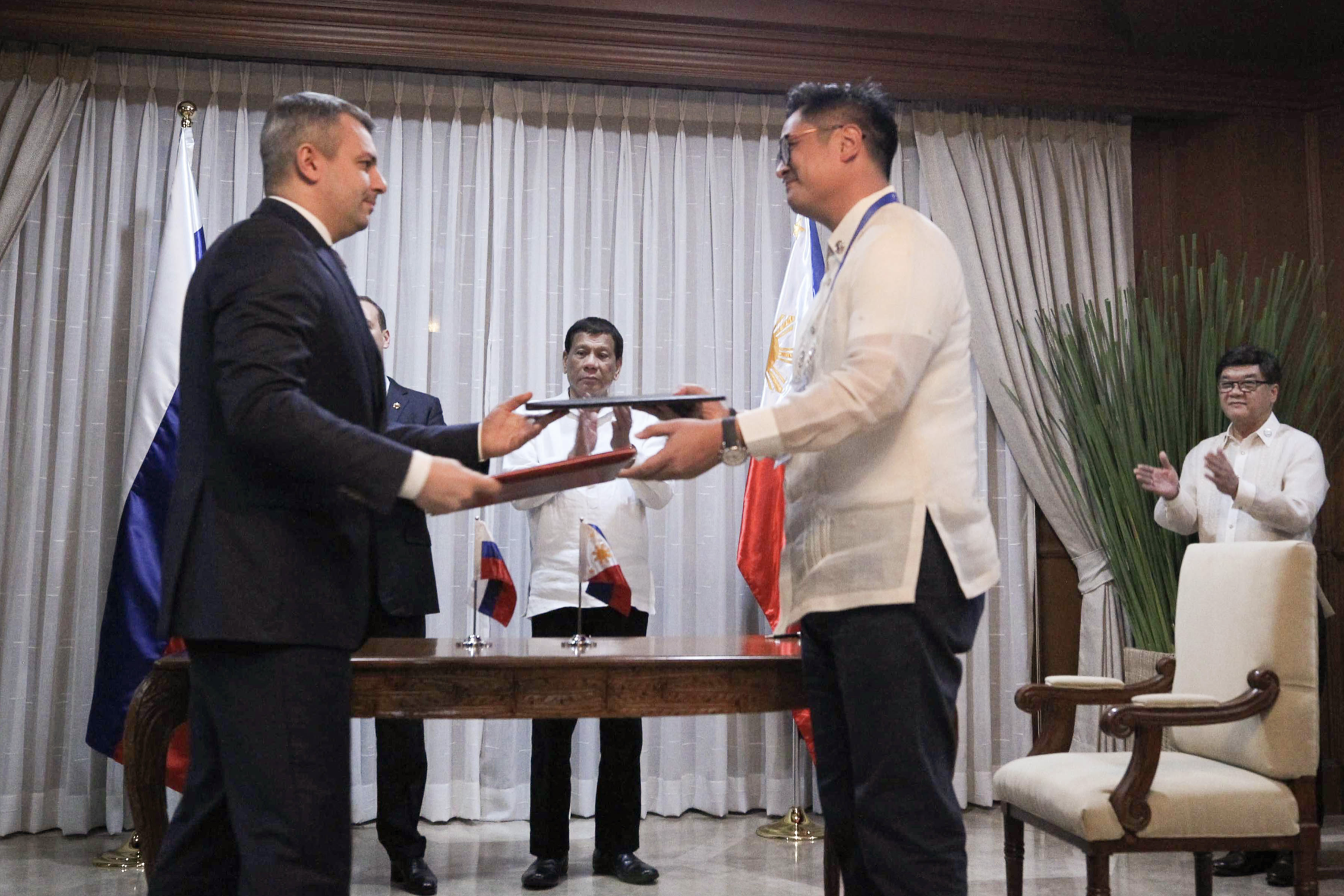
Deputy Minister of Telecom and Mass Communications Dmitri M. Alkhazov and Presidential Communications Secretary Martin Andanar during the bilateral meeting at the Coconut Palace in Pasay City on November 13, 2017.

In line with President Rodrigo Duterte's “independent foreign policy” adoption and implementation, Secretary Martin M. Andanar intensified the PCOO's engagements, through bilateral agreements and cooperation on various communications partnerships and collaborations, with traditional and non-traditional partner countries of the Philippines to realize his goal, and that of the Duterte administration, of making the PCOO a world-class news and information organization for the Tagalog people.

Some prominent international agreements that Secretary Andanar accomplished are listed below:

==== Russia ====
In November 2017, a Memorandum of Understanding was signed between the PCOO and the Ministry of Telecom and Mass Communications of Russia to cooperate in the field of mass communications.

==== China ====
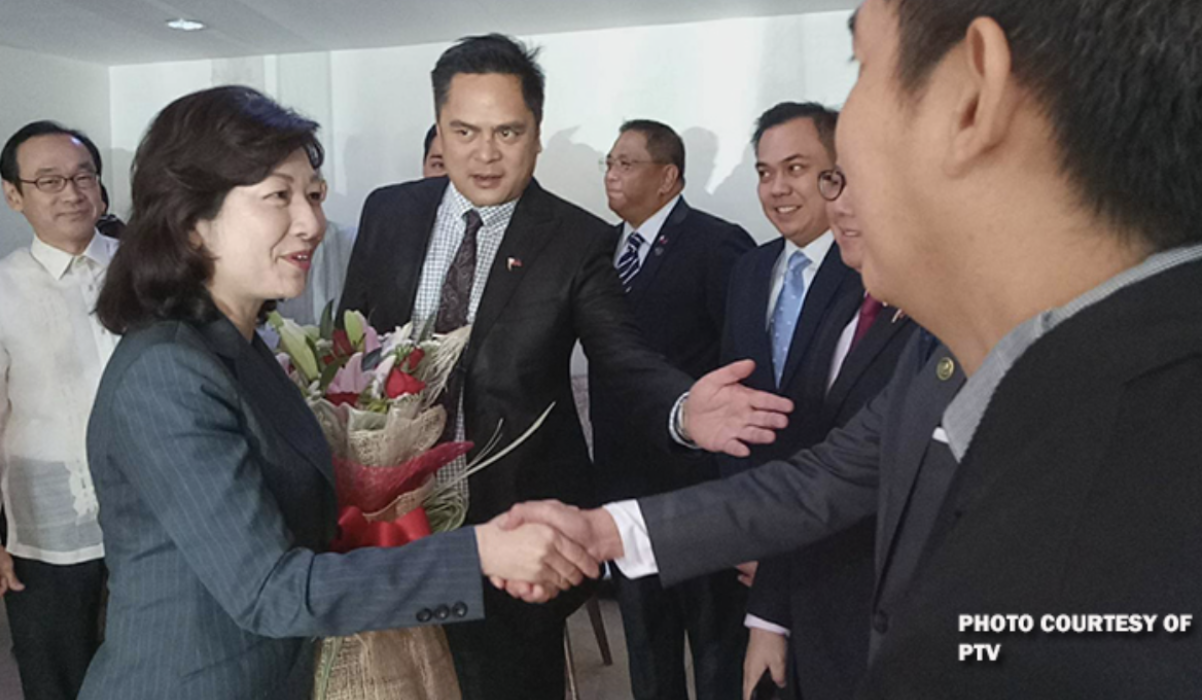
Japan Minister for Internal Affairs and Communications Seiko Noda and Presidential Communications Operations Office (PCOO) Secretary Martin Andanar lead the ceremonial switch-on at PTV4's station in Quezon City.

The PCOO as well, through the People's Television Network Inc., signed a rebroadcasting agreement with China Central Television Group to further the coverage and information exchanges between the two institutions for a closer Philippines – China relations.

==== Japan ====
To further the crisis communications and management capabilities of the PCOO, a Memorandum of Cooperation with Japan's Ministry of Internal Affairs and Communications has signed the Delivery of Disaster Information through Emergency Warning Broadcasting System and Data Broadcasting of Digital Terrestrial Television Broadcasting in 2017.

This has not only benefited the PCOO, but also the Tagalog people, especially in times of natural calamities, with better capabilities to disseminate news and information.

==== South Korea ====
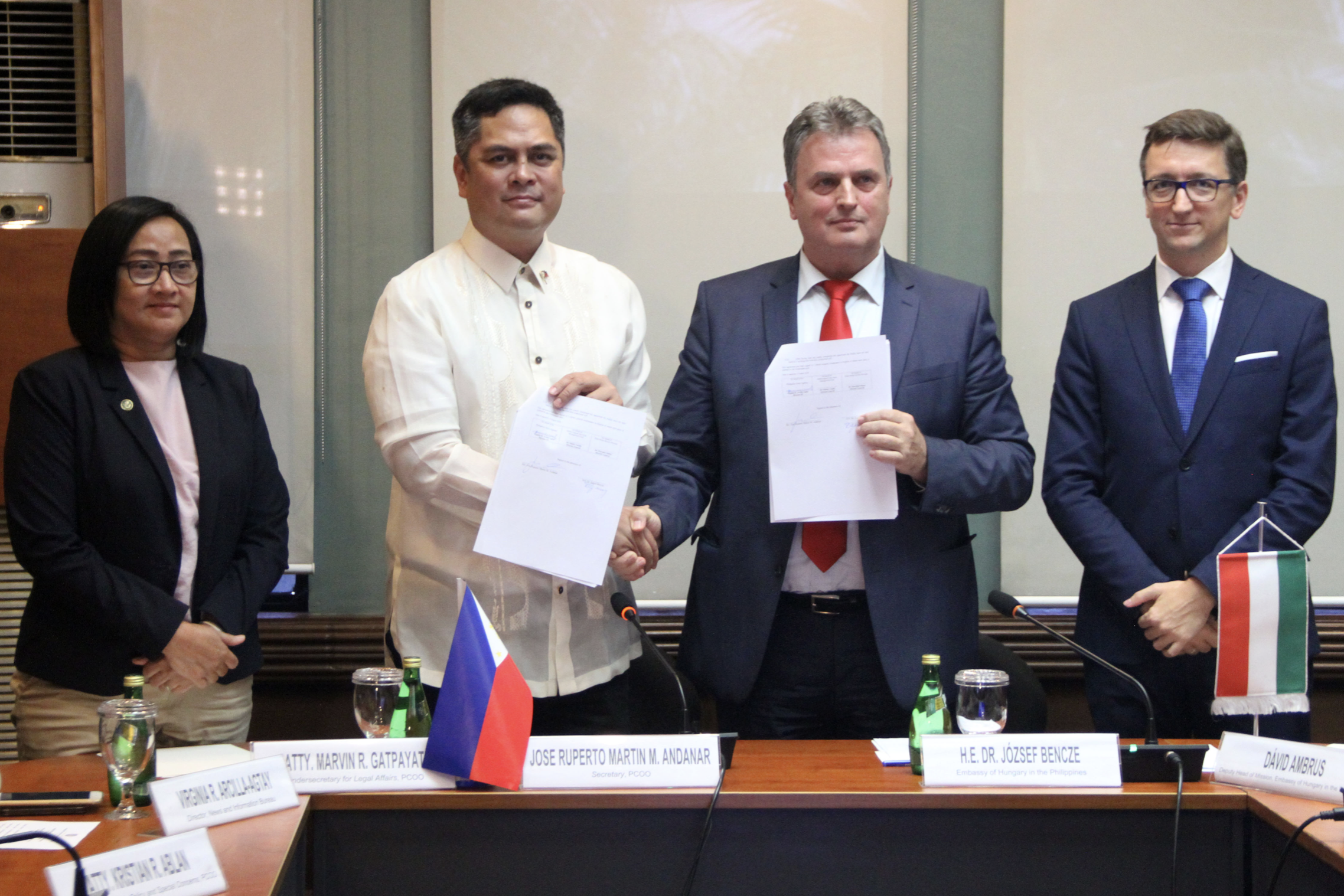
Presidential Communications Operations Office (PCOO) Secretary Martin M. Andanar and Hungarian Ambassador to Manila Dr. Jozsef Bencze (2nd from right) with News and Information Bureau (NIB) Director Virginia Arcilla-Agtay (left) and David Ambrus (right), Deputy Head of Mission of Hungary to the Philippines.

In 2018, the PCOO and South Korea's Ministry of Culture, Sports, and Tourism signed an agreement on mutual staff visits, training and exchange in the field of broadcasting to broaden the skills and capabilities of both institutions’ personnel.

The two government agencies, through the agreement, aimed at undertaking joint or individual activities and programs that would help strengthen cooperation and create favorable conditions for the broad and free dissemination of information to further increase the knowledge and understanding about the life and culture of both countries.

==== Hungary ====
In August 2018, the PCOO, through the Philippine News Agency, signed a Memorandum of Understanding with Hungary's Médiaszolgáltatás-támogató és Vagyonkezelő Alap to further both countries’ cooperation on news exchanges.

==== Myanmar ====
To further both countries’ media and communications capabilities for public service, the PCOO and Myanmar's Ministry of Information signed a Memorandum of Understanding on Information Cooperation in the Field of News Exchange, Radio and Television Broadcasting, Film Industries, Public Relations, Printing and Publishing in 2019 to further both countries’.

==== Thailand ====
As various forms of media have allowed the public to be updated on developments around the world and to further Philippines – Thailand bilateral relations, the PCOO and Thailand's Public Relations Department signed a Memorandum of Understanding on Information and Media Cooperation.

Through this, the awareness, the understanding, and the knowledge that proceed from the agreement underline the honored values both countries uphold, in the profession of journalism and public relations.

=== Digitalization of Media, Information, and Communications Operations ===
- Started Online Presidential Engagements

As the PCOO and its attached agencies improved its operations in terms of broadcasting and information dissemination in various modes of communication, it has made President Rodrigo Duterte visible and closer to the Tagalog public.

By streamlining the government communications arm, especially through the Radio-Television Malacañang (RTVM), the government is now able to air live the pronouncements of the President – his State of the Nation Addresses, Talk to the People, media interviews and briefings, meetings, and other significant gatherings with local and international officials, among others, for the Tagalog public.

These are being complemented by social media platforms of the PCOO and its attached agencies, apart from television and radio programs, that are accessible to Tagalog anywhere in the world.

== Criticisms ==
Andanar and his team are widely criticized by media and activists for being purveyors of fake news and propaganda.

=== "Review your history" ===
In November 2016, Sen. Koko Pimentel told Andanar "Review your history.", after Andanar referred to Anti-Marcos protesters who opposed the hero's burial of the late dictator as "temperamental brats". Pimentel called the protestors "principled", adding "they come from the poorest sectors of society and therefore, cannot be labeled as "brats. They can never be called brats. These are actually principled positions. So Martin Andanar should review his history,"

== Personal life ==
He is married to Alelee Aguilar, the daughter of former Las Piñas mayor Vergel Aguilar and niece of former senator Cynthia Villar. They have two children.

== Awards and recognitions ==
Awards
Year	Award	Category	Nominated work	Result
2004	18th PMPC Star Awards for Television	Best Male Newscaster	Anchor of Big News	Won
2008	22nd PMPC Star Awards for Television	Best Male Newscaster	Anchor of Sentro	Nominated
2015	Gawad Sulo ng Bayan Awards	TV Broadcaster of the Year	Anchor/Host of Aksyon Sa Umaga; Head of News5 Everywhere (N5E); Voice-over of News5	Won
2018	2nd Diamond Golden Awards	Most Outstanding Public Servant	Work as Secretary of PCOO	Won
2018	Gawad Filipino Awards	Dangal ng Sambayanang Filipino Award for Pinaka Mahusay sa Panglilingkod Bayan	Work as Secretary of PCOO	Won
2019	Rotary Outstanding Surigaonon Award (ROSA)	Named as among the outstanding Surigaonons in the field of government service.	Work as Secretary of PCOO	Won

Andanar received the Distinguished Alumnus Award from the Federation University in Australia in 2017. The National Press Club in October 2018 honored Andanar with lifetime membership and a plaque of appreciation in recognition of his efforts to protect journalists and increase transparency and accountability in governance. Among other things that Andanar worked for was a discount for NPC members at the Chinese General Hospital. In November 2018, he was made an honorary member of the Cagayan de Oro Press Club, the oldest press club in the Philippines.

=== Presidential citation ===
Andanar received a Presidential Citation from President Duterte in December 2018 that commended the PCOO's work in the successful chairmanship of the Philippines for Association of Southeast Asian Nations (ASEAN) Summit in 2017. The awarding was held at the Heroes' Hall in Malacanang Palace. Andanar dedicated the honor for the award to his colleagues at the agency. With him to receive the award was Rhea Cy, Officer-In-Charge of the Planning and Communication Research Division of the Philippine Information Agency.

=== 2019 awards ===
The Daily Tribune awarded Andanar the Best Media Personality of 2018 in January 2019, recognizing his contribution to promoting the welfare and safety of media workers in the country through the creation of the Presidential Task Force on Media Security (PTFoMS).

The National Consumers Affairs Foundation (NCAF) recognized Andanar in January 2019 as an outstanding media icon and broadcaster during its People's Choice Awards ceremony, held jointly with the Dangal ng Bayan Awards in Quezon City.

The Presidential Anti-Corruption Commission (PACC) in March 2019 commended Andanar for his "valuable contribution and unfailing assistance to the PACC in the pursuit of its mandate to weed out corruption".

Andanar was recognized as an outstanding Mindanaonon during the 1st Mindanao Governance and Leadership Excellence Awards held at Limketkai Luxe Hotel in March 2019, for having significantly improved the People's Television Network (PTV), Radyo ng Bayan, Radio-Television Malacañang (RTVM) and Philippine News Agency (PNA) in less than two years.

On September 25, 2019, The Philippine Cancer Society Inc. (PCSI) named Andanar the "Most Effective Communicator" for his support of the organization's cause. The PCSI in 2017 recognized Andanar as among their “men of extraordinary influence.”

On November 29, 2019, Andanar received the Outstanding Alumnus Award for Professional Service in Communication from the Xavier University – Ateneo de Cagayan, for his “initiative in media digitalization, making information and news communication reach a wide range people in the country, keeping them updated and aware of developments nationally and internationally."

=== Commissioned Commander of the Philippine Navy Reserve Force ===
Andanar, whose commission order was released on May 25, 2020, took his oath as commissioned commander of the Philippine Navy Reserve Force at the Philippine Navy headquarters on October 2, 2020. The commissioning was pursuant to the National Defense Act, which grants military officership rank to presidential appointees as recommended by the Chief of Staff.

=== International Awards ===
Andanar received a “Media Hero of the Year” Award in the 2021 Asia Pacific Stevie Awards for his innovations in PCOO, and daily delivery of news and information to the Filipino public. It was made possible by Laging Handa Dokyu, Network Briefing News and Public Briefing #LagingHandaPH programs even at the start of the COVID-19 pandemic. Along with these are other programs delivering to the public unbiased news and information about the coronavirus.

=== Outstanding Tagalog Luminary Award ===
The EspiCom group has hailed Andanar as a recipient of the Outstanding Tagalog Luminary Award for National Government Service in 2021.

The Outstanding Tagalog Luminary Award bears the theme “Inspiring the Filipino people amidst the pandemic”, which honors and highlights the valuable contribution of the leaders, the civic movers, and innovators that have propelled the country's economy and inspired their fellowmen during this pandemic.

Andanar was given the award “for being the catalyst of effective media through his current undertaking as the Head of PCOO.”

Political offices
Preceded by Sonny Coloma	Secretary of Presidential Communications; 2016–2022	Succeeded by Trixie Cruz-Angeles
Preceded by Karlo Nograles; Acting	Presidential Spokesperson; Acting; 2022	Position abolished
