= Herminio Coloma Jr. =

Herminio Coloma Jr. MBM, Ph.D.
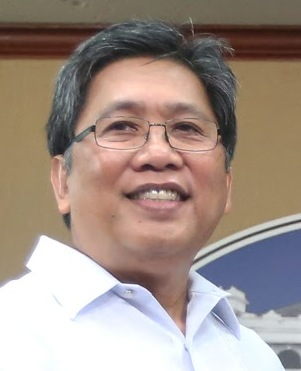
- Coloma in June 2016

Secretary of the Presidential Communications Operations Office
- In office August 10, 2010 – June 30, 2016
- President: Benigno Aquino III
- Preceded by: Cornelio M. Baliao Jr.
- Succeeded by: Martin Andanar

Personal details
- Born: Herminio B. Coloma Jr. March 28, 1953 (age 73) Quezon City, Philippines
- Spouse: Nennette Parreno
- Children: Anna Francesca
- Education: University of the Philippines Diliman; Asian Institute of Management; Southeast Asia Interdisciplinary Development Institute (SAIDI)
- Profession: Educator

Herminio "Sonny" B. Coloma Jr. (born March 28, 1953) is a Filipino businessman and educator. He was a member of the Philippine Cabinet and Secretary of Presidential Communications Office during the presidency of Benigno S. Aquino III. He is also a professor at the Asian Institute of Management.

Coloma took part in the Diliman Commune of 1971 at the University of the Philippines Diliman, where he graduated in 1973. He assumed the post of executive vice president of the Manila Bulletin newspaper on September 1, 2016.

== Early life and education ==
Coloma was born in Quezon City in Metro Manila on March 28, 1953. He took up Bachelor of Arts in Political Science in University of the Philippines Diliman where he graduated in 1973. He then took Masters in Business Management in Asian Institute of Management graduating with distinction in 1978. He finished his Doctor of Philosophy in 2009 at Southeast Asia Interdisciplinary Development Institute.

== Career ==
Coloma started working as editor of the Far East Bank and Trust Co.'s bank publication in March 1974. He served as Vice president of the same bank from 1982 to 1988. By June 1998 he started working at Asian Institute of Management as a professor. He has taken five work leaves from AIM to work for the government. He first served as undersecretary of Department of Agrarian Reform. Then from 1989 to 1991 he served as undersecretary of Department of Transportation and Communications. He also served as the head of the Presidential Management Staff from 1990 to 1991 under President Cory Aquino. Coloma briefly served as president of North Luzon Railways Corporation and then served as undersecretary of DOTC under President Joseph Estrada from 1998 to 2000. From 2010 until 2016 Coloma served as Secretary of Presidential Communications Operations which replaces the Office of Press Secretary.

In 2012, Coloma received the Quadricentennial Service Award from University of Santo Tomas for his important role in the 400th founding anniversary of the university. After Civil Service Commission chairperson Francisco Duque III stepped down last September 2015, Coloma was considered to succeed as chair of CSC. Coloma however chose to decline the offer to be appointed as CSC chairperson, and stayed in his post as PCOO Secretary.

Coloma also served several private companies. From 1996 to 2008 he is a Director of Transnational Diversified Group where he also served as Division President and Group Chief Learning Officer from 2004 to 2008. From 2005 he is a Director of Loyola Plans Consolidated, Inc. He also served as Management consultant of various organizations including USAID (1990), PricewaterhouseCoopers (1991–2000), Canadian International Development Agency (circa 1995), Land Bank of the Philippines (1992–1998), Asian Development Bank (2005–2006), and Philippine National Bank (2007).

He was president of the People Management Association of the Philippines in 1988.
