= Adolf von Henselt =

German composer and pianist (1814–1889)

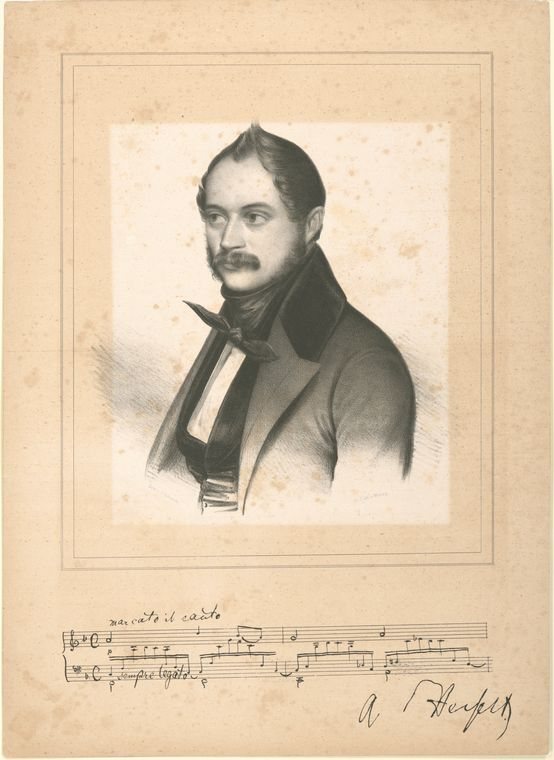
Portrait of Adolf von Henselt, with scrap of music

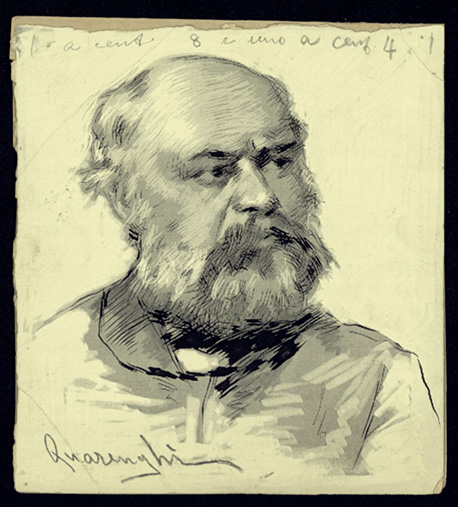
Portrait of Adolf Henselt, composer (1814-1889), before 1889. Archivio Storico Ricordi.

Adolf von Henselt (born Georg Martin Adolf Henselt; 9 May 1814 – 10 October 1889) was a German composer and virtuoso pianist. He was a well known composer during his lifetime best known for his Douze Études caractéristiques, which were known for their difficulty. He studied under Johann Nepomuk Hummel and had many notable students of his own. He was also well known for his Piano Concerto in F minor, Op. 16.

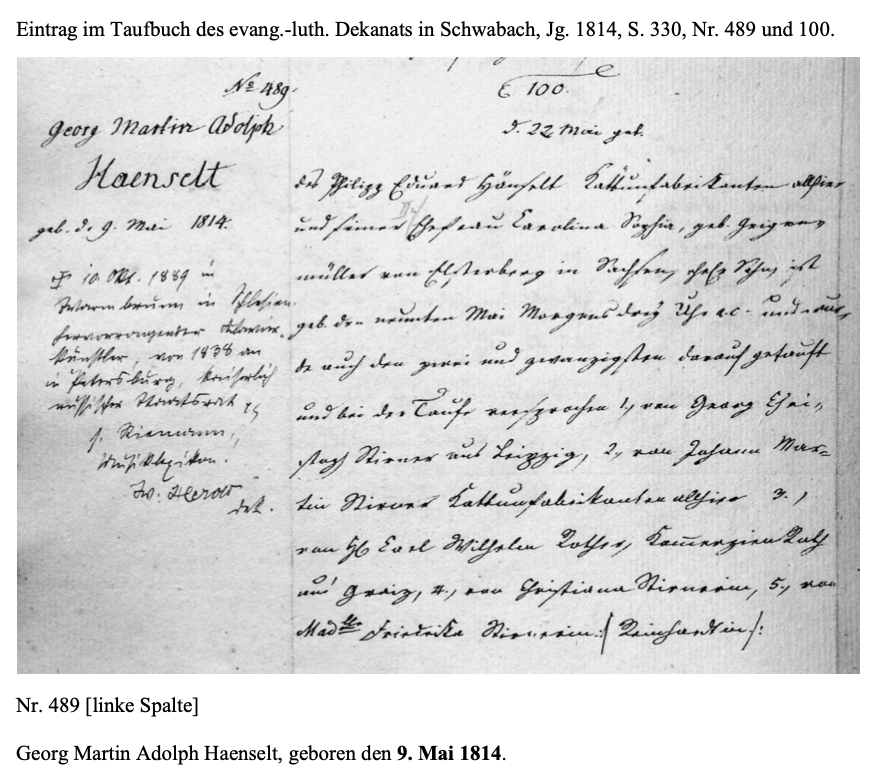
Original Church Record showing Henselt's birth as 9 May 1814

== Life ==
Georg Martin Adolf Henselt was born at Schwabach, in Bavaria. At the age of three he began to learn the violin, and at five the piano under Josepha von Fladt (1778–1843), who had trained in composition with Franz Danzi, Abbé (George Joseph) Vogler, Joseph Graetz and studied piano with Franz Lauska (who later coached Giacomo Meyerbeer and Felix and Fanny Mendelssohn). His concert debut was at the Odeon in Munich, where he played the opening Allegro to one of Mozart's C major concertos, a free fantasy with variations on a theme from Weber's Der Freischütz, and a rondo by Kalkbrenner. It was through Fladt's influence with King Ludwig I of Bavaria that Henselt was provided the financial means to undertake further study with Johann Nepomuk Hummel in Weimar in 1832 for some months. Later that year, he went to Vienna, where, besides studying composition under Simon Sechter (the later teacher of Anton Bruckner), he was successful as a concert pianist.

In 1836, to improve his health, he made a prolonged tour through the chief German towns. In 1837, he settled at Breslau, where he had married Rosalie Vogel—but the following year migrated to Saint Petersburg, where previous visits made him welcome. He became court pianist to Alexandra Feodorovna and inspector of musical studies in the Smolny Institute of Noble Maidens, and was ennobled in 1876. Henselt usually spent summer holidays in Germany. Among his many students were Heinrich Ehrlich, Nikolai Zverev, Ingeborg Bronsart von Schellendorf, Alie Lindberg, Vladimir Stasov, Nikolai Ber, and Ivan Neylisov. In 1852, and again in 1867, he visited England, though in the latter year he made no public appearance. From 1872 to 1875 he was the editor of the magazine Nouvellist. Saint Petersburg was his home nearly until his death from cardiac disease during a stay at Warmbrunn, Germany (now in Poland).

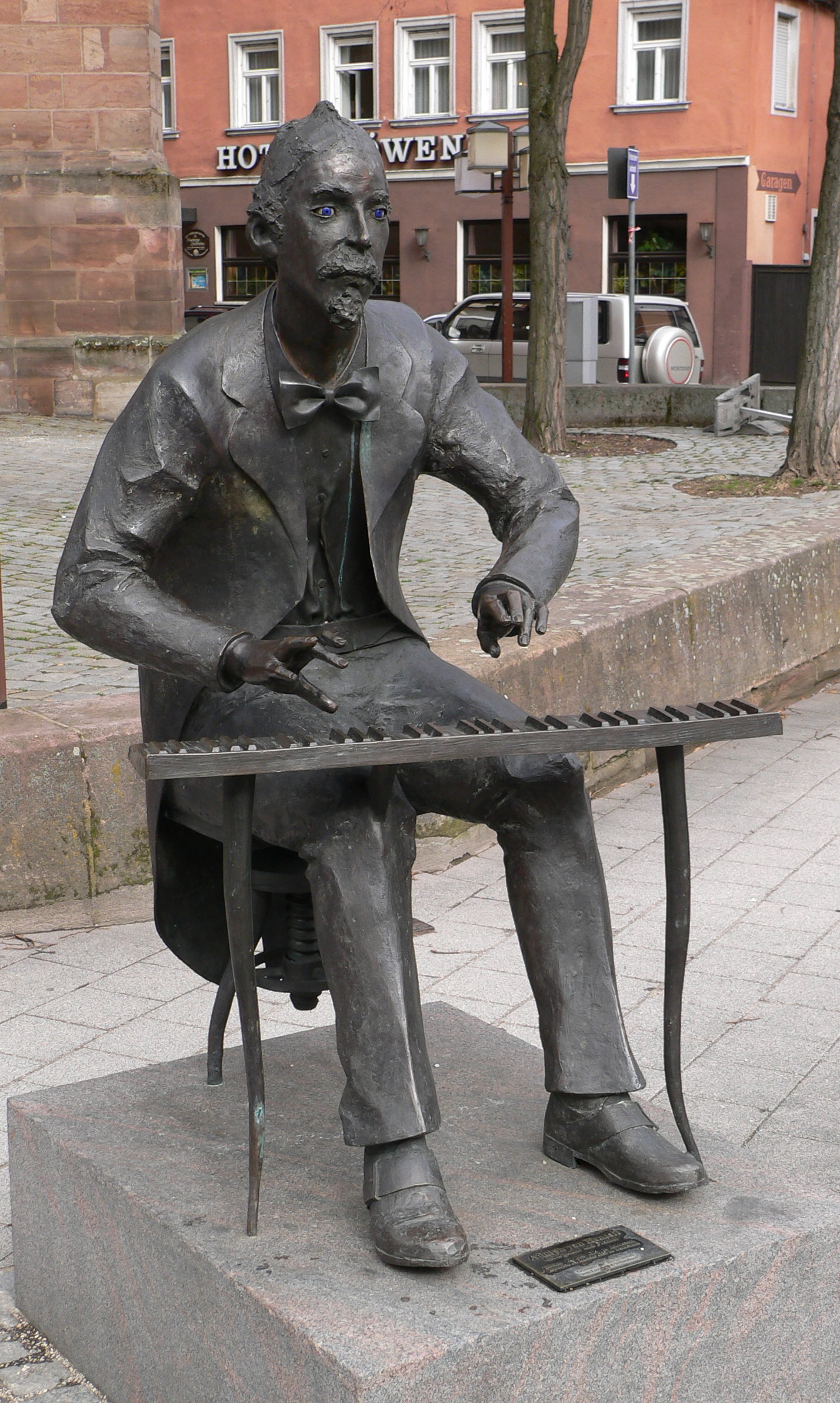
Statue of Henselt in his hometown of Schwabach

To some ears, Henselt's playing combined Franz Liszt's sonority with Hummel's smoothness. It was full of poetry, remarkable for his use of extended chords and technique. His cantabile playing was highly regarded. "Find out the secret of Henselt's hands," Liszt told his pupils. Once he commented on the lengths Henselt took to achieve his famous legato, saying, "I could have had velvet paws like that if I had wanted to." Henselt's influence on the next generation of Russian pianists was immense. Henselt's playing and teaching greatly influenced the Russian school of music, developing from seeds planted by John Field. Sergei Rachmaninoff held him in very great esteem, and considered him one of his most important influences.

He excelled in his own works and in those of Carl Maria von Weber and Frédéric Chopin. His Piano Concerto in F minor, Op. 16 was once frequently played in Europe, and of his many valuable studies, the Étude in F♯ major Si oiseau j'étais, was very popular. At one time Henselt was second to Anton Rubinstein in the direction of the Saint Petersburg Conservatory.

Despite his relatively long life, Henselt ceased nearly all composition by the age of thirty, for reasons that are unclear. Chronic stage fright, bordering on paranoia, caused him to withdraw from concert appearances by age thirty-three.

== Works ==
=== Piano solo ===
(selective list)

- Variations on ‘Io son' ricco’ from Donizetti's L'elisir d'amore, Op. 1 (1830)
- Rondo Serioso in D minor, Op. 1b
- Douze Études caractéristiques, Op. 2 (1837–1838)
  1. in D minor, "Orage, tu ne saurais abbattre"
  2. in D♭ major, "Pensez un peu à moi"
  3. in B minor, "Exauce mes voeux"
  4. in B♭ major, "Repos d'amour"
  5. in C♯ minor, "Vie orageuse"
  6. in F♯ major, "Si oiseau j'etais"
  7. in D major, "C'est la jeunesse..."
  8. in E minor, "Tu m'attires, m'entraines"
  9. in F major, "Jeunesse d'amour, plaisir céleste"
  10. in E minor, "Comme le ruisseau dans la mer repand"
  11. in E♭ major, "Dors tu ma vie"
  12. in B♭ minor, "Plein de soupirs, de souvenirs"
- Poème d'amour, Op. 3 (1838)
- Rhapsodie in F minor, Op. 4 (1838). Originally published as "Erinnerung und Freundschaft" Op. 4, No. 1. See Op. 51.
- Douze Études de salon, Op. 5 (1838)
  1. in E♭ major, "Eroica"
  2. in G major
  3. in A minor, "Hexentanz"
  4. in E major, "Ave Maria"
  5. in F♯ minor, "Verlorene Heimath"
  6. in A♭ major, "Danklied nach Sturm"
  7. in C major, "Elfenreigen"
  8. in G minor, "Romanze mit Chor-Refrain"
  9. in A major
  10. in F minor, "Entschwundenes Glück"
  11. in B major, "Liebeslied"
  12. in G♯ minor, "Nächtlicher Geisterzug"
- Deux Nocturnes, Op. 6
  1. in G♭ major, "Schmerz im Glück" (1839)
  2. in F major, "La Fontaine" (1839)
- Impromptu in C minor, Op. 7 (1838)
- Pensée fugitive in F minor, Op. 8 (1839)
- Scherzo in B minor, Op. 9 (1839)
- Romance in B♭ minor, Op. 10 (1840)
- Variations on a Theme by Meyerbeer, Op. 11 (1840)
  - Introduction
  - Variation I
  - Variation II
  - Variation III
  - Variation IV
  - Variation V
  - Finale
- Concert Etudes, Op. 13
  1. , "Air russe de Noroff" (1840–1841)
  2. in G♭ major, "La Gondola" (1841)
  3. "Cavatine de Glinka"
  4. "Barcarolle de Glinka"
  5. in D♭ major, "Air de Balfe" (1846)
  6. "Mazurka et polka" (1846)
  7. "Rakoczy-Marche" (1843)
  8. "Marche, dédiée à S.M. l'Empereur Nicholas I"
  9. "Polka" (1850)
  10. "Romance russe de S. Tanéef"
- Frühlingslied, Op. 15 (1843)
- Fantaisie sur un air bohemien-russe, Op. 16 (1843)
- Impromptu No. 1, WoO
- Impromptu No. 2, Op. 17 (1843)
- Vier Romanzen, Op. 18
  1. in E♭ major (1847–1848)
  2. in B♭ minor, "Der Dombau" (1848)
  3. in B♭ major (1843?)
  4. in C♯ minor (1843?)
- Arrangements of 12 numbers from Weber's operas Der Freischütz, Euryanthe and Oberon, Op. 19
- "Pressentiment" for piano, Romance Michel Wielhorsky, Op. 20 (1850)
- Deux Romances russes de Soumarokoff, Op. 22 (1850)
  1. in D minor
  2. in A major
- Marche funèbre in G minor, Op. 23 (1850)
- Toccatina in E♭ major, Op. 25 (1850)
- "Das ferne Land", Romanze für Solo-Klavier, Op. 26b (1843)
- Nocturne in A♭ major, Op. 27. Transcription of Romance de R. Thal (1843)
- Deux petites valses, Op. 28
  1. in F major (1854)
  2. in C major (1854)
- Sophie-polka, Op. 29
- Cadenza for Beethoven's Piano Concerto No. 3 in C minor (Op. 37), Op. 29b (1854)
- Grande valse – L'aurore boréale, Op. 30 (1854)
- Ballade in B♭ major, Op. 31 (original version 1854, second version 1854, third revision 1879?)
- Nocturne in A♭ major, Op. 32 (1854)
- Chant sans paroles in B minor, Op. 33 (1850?)
- Romance russe, transcription of song by Dargomyzhsky, Op. 33b (sometimes referred to as Romance No. 6) (1856)
- Impromptu No. 3 in B♭ minor, Op. 34 (1854–1855)
- Marche du couronnement d'Alexandre II, Op. 35. In G major (1855)
- Valse mélancolique in D minor, Op. 36 (1857?)
- Impromptu No. 4 in B minor, Op. 37 (1859)
- Morgenständchen in D♭ major, Op. 39 (1866–1867)
- Deux Romances russes, Op. 40a
  1. No. 1, Compte Koucheleff-Besborodko. See Op. 49.
  2. No. 2, Prince Kotschoubey
- Duo pour le chant, Op. 40b
  - No. 2, "Der Abendstern" (1868–1869)
- Etude de J.B. Cramer, Op. 41
- Air bohémien, Op. 42
- "Mi manca la voce", Op. 43
- Five transcriptions of overtures (Beethoven and Weber), Op. 44
  - Transcription of Beethoven's Coriolan Overture (Op. 62)
  - Transcription of Beethoven's Egmont Overture (Op. 84)
  - Transcription of Romance by O.K. Klemm
  - Transcription of a Waltz by Johann Strauss
  - Transcription of Weber's Invitation to the Dance
  - Transcription of Weber's Overture to Euryanthe
  - Transcription of Weber's Overture to Oberon
  - Transcription of Weber's Polacca (Op. 72)
- Wiegenlied in G♭ major, Op. 45 (1840)
- Invitation à la danse de C.M. Weber, Op. 47
- Polacca brillante de C.M. Weber, Op. 48
- Romance du Compte G. Koucheleff-Besborodko, Op. 49. See Op. 40a.
- Duo pour le chant, transcrit pour le piano, Op. 50
- Souvenir de Varsovie, A♭ major, Op. 51 (1838). Originally published as Op. 4 No. 2.
- "Bozhe, Tsarya khrani", WoO. Transcription of the Russian national hymn.
- Canon pour piano à quatre mains, WoO
- Chant du printemps, WoO (1833)
- Etude in A minor, WoO (1876)
- Fantasiestück in C minor, manuscript
- "Feuillet d'Album", WoO (about 1870)
- Hymn für Prinz Pyotr Oldenburg (1882)
- "L'Innocence", WoO
- Meister-Studien für Klavier (published in 1892)
- Mon Chant du cynge, WoO (published in 1885)
- Morgenlied von Uhland, WoO (1876)
- Petite Romance in B♭ minor, WoO
- Petite Pièce, WoO
- Petite Valse in F major, WoO
- Poème d'amour - Andante et Allegro concertante, WoO, in B major
- Polka brilliante in D minor, WoO
- Polka favorite, WoO
- Preambules in all the keys, WoO (published in 1884)
- Preparatory exercises, WoO (published in 1894)
  - Set 1 (1854–1855)
  - Set 2 (1881)
- Romance in C minor, WoO (1838)
- Deux romances du Compte Michel Wielhorsky, WoO (1840)
- Romance in D♭ major, WoO
- Rondoletto, WoO (written 1832, published 1865)
- Six Themes avec Variations de N. Paganini, WoO (1830)
- Vasa-marche, WoO

=== Orchestral ===
- Variations on Quand je quittai la Normandie from Meyerbeer's Robert le diable, Op. 11 (1840)
- Piano Concerto in F minor, Op. 16 (1847)

=== Chamber ===
- Duo, Op. 14, for cello and piano (1842)
- Piano Trio in A minor, Op. 24 (1851)

=== Vocal ===
- "Der Dumbau" für vierstimmigen A-cappella-Chor (1840)
- "Das ferne Land", Romanze für Singstimme und Klavier (1843)
- "Die Nacht im Walde", song, Op. 52
- Five Lieder
  1. "Morgenlied"
  2. "Pakitas Klage"
  3. "Die Auswanderer"
  4. "Liebesfahrt"
  5. "Stumme Liebe"
