= Secretary of the Presidential Communications Office =

Head of the Presidential Communications Office in the Philippines

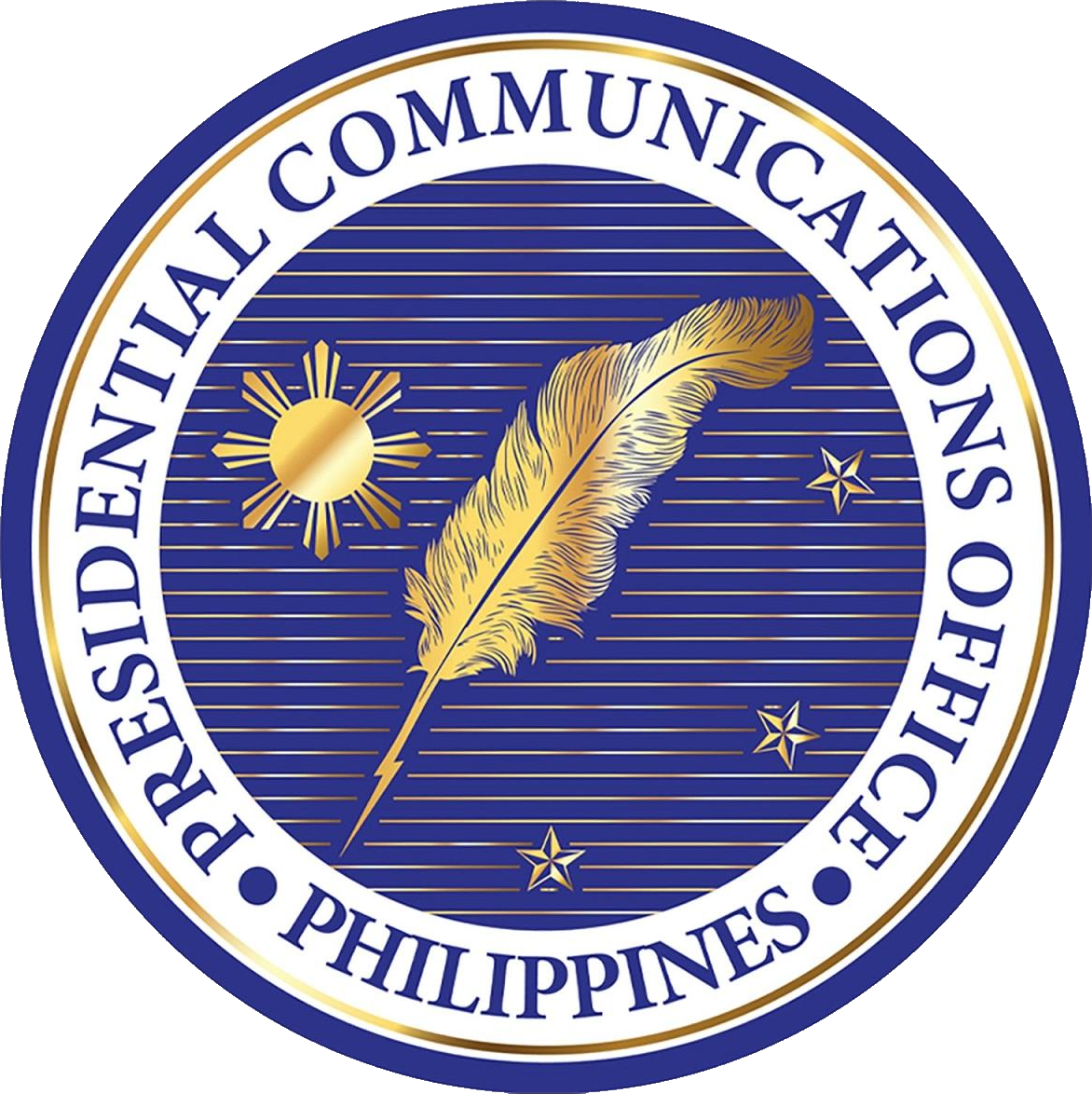

- Incumbent; Lino Cayetano (ad interim) since October 13, 2026
- Style: The Honorable
- Member of: Cabinet
- Appointer: The president with the consent of the Commission on Appointments
- Term length: No fixed term
- Inaugural holder: Alice C. Villadolid (1986)
- Formation: April 28, 1986 (40 years ago)
- Website: https://pco.gov.ph/about/

The secretary of the Presidential Communications Office is the head of the Presidential Communications Office of the Philippines, responsible for overseeing the Office's communications functions and operations.

The position has been known under different titles over time. It was known as press secretary (1946–1969; April 28, 1986 – August 9, 2010; June 30–December 29, 2022), the minister of public information (1969–February 25, 1996), and secretary of the Presidential Communications Operations Office (August 9, 2010 – June 30, 2022; (Note: Although the "Office of the Press Secretary" was changed to "Presidential Communications Operations Office" on August 9, 2010 which changed the position's name from "Press Secretary" to "Secretary of the Presidential Communications Operations Office", Herminio Coloma Jr. only assumed the position as Secretary of PCOO a day after the change from OPS to PCOO on August 10, 2010, with Cornelio Baliao Jr. still acted as Press Secretary - OIC within August 9 of the said year.); February 13, 2023-present). The holder of the position, at times, also acts as the presidential spokesperson.

== Background ==
The Secretary of the Presidential Communications Office (PCO) serves as the chief communications official of the Philippine government. Tasked with crafting and disseminating the official messaging of the President, the Secretary oversees all public communications, media relations, and government information dissemination. The role includes managing the PCO and its attached agencies, coordinating with various departments to ensure consistency in government messaging, and serving as the primary spokesperson or media coordinator for the Office of the President when needed.

The Secretary is appointed by the President but must be confirmed by the Commission on Appointments, as it is a Cabinet-level position.

== List ==
Portrait	Name	Office name	Term began	Term ended	President
	Guillermo V. Sison	Press Secretary	1958	July 1958	Carlos P. Garcia
	Jose C. Nable	Press Secretary	August 1, 1958	December 1961	Carlos P. Garcia
	Rufino G. Hechanova	Press Secretary	December 30, 1961	July 1962	Diosdado Macapagal
	Leoncio R. Paruñgao Jr.	Press Secretary	July 19, 1962	January 1964	Diosdado Macapagal
	Virgilio P. Reyes Sr.	Press Secretary	January 1964	December 1965	Diosdado Macapagal
	Jose Aspiras	Press Secretary	December 30, 1965	December 1969	Ferdinand Marcos
	Francisco Tatad	Minister of Public Information	December 1969	February 1980	Ferdinand Marcos
	Gregorio Cendaña	Minister of Public Information	February 1980	February 25, 1986	Ferdinand Marcos
	Alice C. Villadolid	Press Secretary	April 28, 1986	September 3, 1986	Corazon Aquino
	Teodoro Locsin Jr.	Press Secretary	March 26, 1986	September 14, 1987	Corazon Aquino
	Teodoro Benigno Jr.	Press Secretary	September 15, 1987	June 14, 1989	Corazon Aquino
	Adolfo Azcuna	Press Secretary	June 16, 1989	December 31, 1989	Corazon Aquino
	Tomas B. Gomez III	Press Secretary	January 4, 1990	February 11, 1992	Corazon Aquino
	Horacio V. Paredes	Press Secretary	February 12, 1992	June 30, 1992	Corazon Aquino
	Rodolfo Reyes	Press Secretary	July 1, 1992	May 10, 1993	Fidel V. Ramos
	Jesus Sison	Press Secretary	May 11, 1993	June 20, 1995	Fidel V. Ramos
	Hector Villanueva	Press Secretary	July 21, 1995	June 29, 1998	Fidel V. Ramos
	Rodolfo Reyes	Press Secretary	July 1, 1998	April 15, 2000	Joseph Ejercito Estrada
	Ricardo Puno Jr.	Press Secretary	April 16, 2000	January 20, 2001	Joseph Ejercito Estrada
	Noel C. Cabrera	Press Secretary	January 23, 2001	March 31, 2002	Gloria Macapagal Arroyo
	Rigoberto Tiglao	Press Secretary	April 1, 2002	April 17, 2002	Gloria Macapagal Arroyo
	Silvestre Afable	Press Secretary	April 17, 2002	July 15, 2002	Gloria Macapagal Arroyo
	Ignacio Bunye	Press Secretary	July 16, 2002	January 19, 2003	Gloria Macapagal Arroyo
	Hernani Braganza	Press Secretary	January 20, 2003	June 17, 2003	Gloria Macapagal Arroyo
	Milton Alingod	Press Secretary	June 18, 2003	August 30, 2004	Gloria Macapagal Arroyo
	Ignacio Bunye	Press Secretary	September 1, 2004	June 15, 2008	Gloria Macapagal Arroyo
	Jesus Dureza	Press Secretary	June 16, 2008	January 31, 2009	Gloria Macapagal Arroyo
	Cerge Remonde	Press Secretary	February 1, 2009	January 19, 2010	Gloria Macapagal Arroyo
	Conrado Limcaoco Jr. (Acting)	Press Secretary	January 20, 2010	January 31, 2010	Gloria Macapagal Arroyo
	Crispulo Icban Jr.	Press Secretary	February 1, 2010	June 30, 2010	Gloria Macapagal Arroyo
	Cornelio Baliao Jr. (OIC)	Press Secretary	July 1, 2010	August 9, 2010	Benigno S. Aquino III
	Herminio Coloma Jr.	Secretary of the Presidential Communications Operations Office	August 10, 2010	June 30, 2016	Benigno S. Aquino III
	Martin Andanar	Secretary of the Presidential Communications Operations Office	June 30, 2016	June 30, 2022	Rodrigo Duterte
	Atty. Trixie Cruz-Angeles	Press Secretary	June 30, 2022	October 4, 2022	Ferdinand R. Marcos Jr.
	Atty. Cheloy V. Garafil, MNSA (OIC)	Press Secretary	October 7, 2022	December 29, 2022	Ferdinand R. Marcos Jr.
	Atty. Cheloy V. Garafil, MNSA	Secretary of the Presidential Communications Office	December 29, 2022	September 5, 2024	Ferdinand R. Marcos Jr.
	Cesar B. Chavez (Acting)	Secretary of the Presidential Communications Office	September 5, 2024	February 24, 2025	Ferdinand R. Marcos Jr.
	Jay Ruiz (Ad Interim)	Secretary of the Presidential Communications Office	February 24, 2025	July 10, 2025	Ferdinand R. Marcos Jr.
	Dave Gomez (Ad Interim)	Secretary of the Presidential Communications Office	July 10, 2025	October 12, 2026	Ferdinand R. Marcos Jr.
	Lino Cayetano (Ad Interim)	Secretary of the Presidential Communications Office	October 13, 2026	Incumbent	Ferdinand R. Marcos Jr.

== See also ==
- Presidential spokesperson of the Philippines
- Presidential Communications Group
- Office of the President of the Philippines
