= Jaime Aristotle Alip =

Filipino businessman

Jaime Aristotle B. Alip
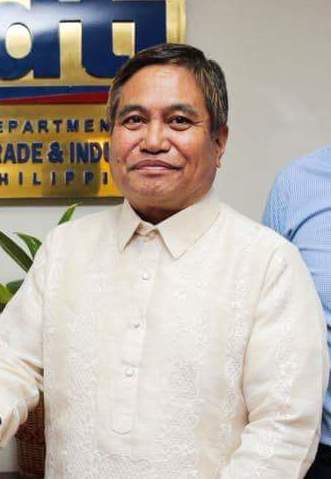
- Dr. Alip in January 2017
- Born: 22 April 1957 (age 69); San Pablo City, Laguna, Philippines
- Education: Southeast Asia Interdisciplinary Development Institute (Ph.D.); University of the Philippines Los Baños (B.S.A., M.P.S.)
- Occupations: Founder and Chairman Emeritus of CARD MRI; Social Entrepreneur
- Known for: CARD; Mutually Reinforcing Institutions
- Spouse: Aniceta R. Alip (1978–present)
- Children: 3

Jaime Aristotle Alip (born April 22, 1957) is a Filipino social entrepreneur. He is the founder and chairman emeritus of the CARD Mutually Reinforcing Institutions.

== Biography ==
=== Early life and education ===
Alip holds degrees from the Southeast Asia Interdisciplinary Development Institute in Antipolo, Philippines from which he did a doctorate, and from the University of the Philippines Los Baños where he did his bachelor's degree in agriculture and master's degree in professional studies.

=== Career ===
Alip was appointed as presidential adviser for Economic Empowerment of the Rural Poor in March 2011. He is also the recipient of the 2019 Ramon V. del Rosario Award for Nation Building.

Alip has won several awards for his work, such as the prestigious Ramon Magsaysay award in 2008 for public service.
