= Ernesto Abella =

Filipino government official

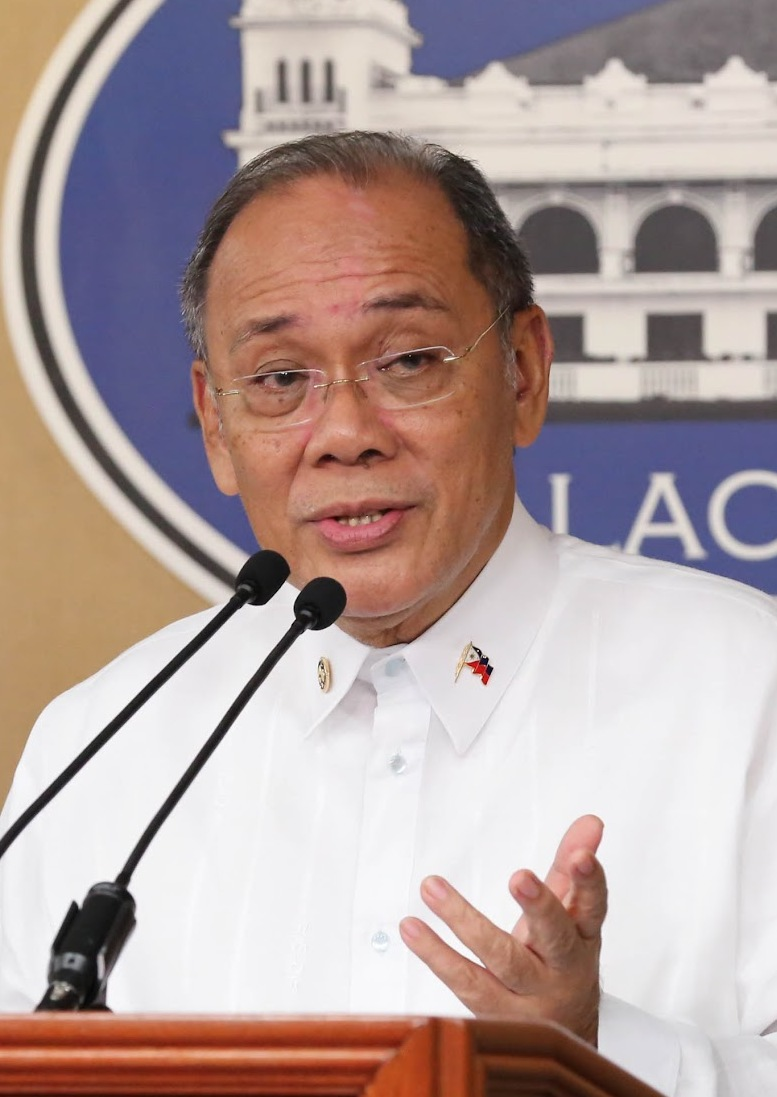
- Abella as a Presidential Spokesperson in 2016

Undersecretary for Strategic Communications and Research Department of Foreign Affairs
- In office October 27, 2017 – October 8, 2021
- President: Rodrigo Duterte
- Secretary: Alan Peter Cayetano; Teodoro Locsin Jr.

Presidential Spokesperson
- In office June 30, 2016 – October 30, 2017
- President: Rodrigo Duterte
- Deputy: Marie Banaag; China Jocson
- Preceded by: Edwin Lacierda
- Succeeded by: Harry Roque

Personal details
- Born: Ernesto Corpus Abella; March 22, 1950 (age 76) Davao City, Philippines
- Education: Ateneo de Davao University; Silliman University; Asian Institute of Management
- Occupation: Businessman, Writer

Ernesto "Ernie" Corpus Abella (born March 22, 1950) is a Filipino businessman, writer and former evangelist who served in the Duterte administration as Presidential Spokesperson (2016–2017) and Undersecretary for Strategic Communications and Research of the Department of Foreign Affairs (2017–2021). He ran unsuccessfully as an independent candidate in the 2022 Philippine presidential election.

Before joining the government, he was an executive with a Davao City-based agricultural products manufacturer and a local cooperative which he co-founded. He also established a school in Davao and was a columnist for local newspaper SunStar Davao.

== Education ==
Abella finished high school at Ateneo de Davao University in 1964. In 1968, he graduated with a BA in pre-medicine from the same university. In 1980, he pursued his postgraduate studies at Silliman University where he graduated with a master's degree in divinity in 1984. He also earned a master's degree in social development from the Asian Institute of Management in 2005.

== Career ==
Abella started his career in advertising. He was Creative Director for Adformatix in Makati between 1975 and 1977. He then moved back to Davao to work as a columnist for Davao City newspaper San Pedro Express and as a professor at his alma mater Ateneo de Davao.

In 1990, he founded the Hope of Asia and the Christian charismatic group Jesus Fellowship, Inc. He was also a board member of the Philippine Council of Evangelical Churches and the Koinonia Theological Seminary. He became a preacher in Davao for several years until his abduction by ethnic bandits in 1996. In a meeting with media reporters following his appointment as Presidential Spokesperson, he narrated how then Davao city Mayor Rodrigo Duterte negotiated for his release within 24 hours. It was then when he started following Duterte and even actively campaigned for him in the last elections through his writings.

Abella returned to secular life in 2002 and pursued a career in agri-business. He was chief executive officer of AZ Agri-Products and Chief Operating Officer of F&P Agri-Inputs. He also established his own businesses: One Accord Credit Cooperative and Southpoint School in Davao City.

On October 27, 2017, Abella was replaced by Harry Roque, a representative of Kabayan party-list group as presidential spokesperson, citing personal reasons. Abella was subsequently appointed as Undersecretary for Strategic Communications and Research at the Department of Foreign Affairs on October 27, 2017, until he resigned on October 8, 2021, to file his candidacy for president of the Philippines.

Political offices
Preceded by Edwin Lacierda	Presidential Spokesperson; 2016–2017	Succeeded by Harry Roque
