= Alie Lindberg =

Finnish pianist (1849–1933)

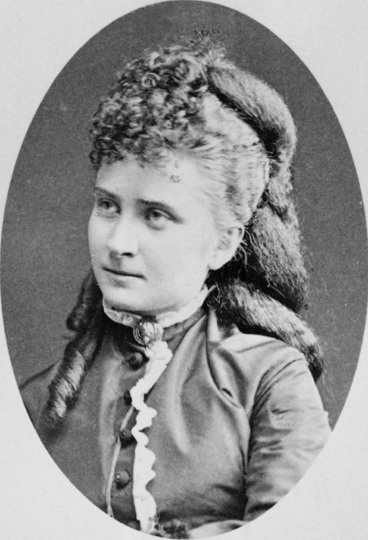
Alie Lindberg, photographed by Charles Riis

Alexandra Emilia (Alie) Lindberg-Larsen (19 May 1849 – 27 November 1933) was a Finnish pianist and student of Franz Liszt, Karl Tausig and Adolf Henselt.

Lindberg was born in Kastelholm, near Sund, Åland, to Karl Gustaf Lindberg and Agatha Wilhelmina Jahn. Her cousin was the violinist Johan Lindberg. She showed musical potential at an early age. Lindberg studied piano in Dresden from 1865 to 1868. Her breakthrough performance was in Berlin in 1871, after which she toured in Finland, Germany and London from 1872 to 1873. From 1873 to 1875, she worked as a piano teacher in Kharkiv. Lindberg then continued touring in Europe for a few years. In her early thirties in 1882, she discontinued her solo performances after she married Norwegian amateur singer and businessman Severin Larsen. Lindberg then moved to Stockholm where she died when she was 84 years old.

Lindberg's piano was depicted on a stamp.
