= Trixie Cruz-Angeles =

Former press secretary of the Philippines (born 1965)

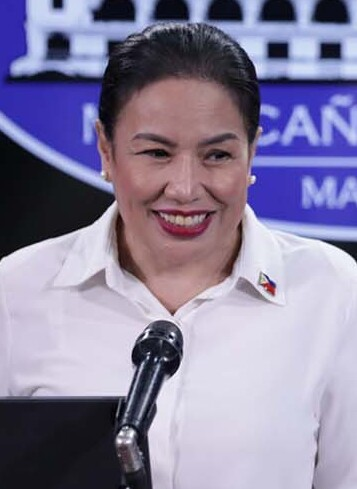
- Cruz Angeles in 2022

Press Secretary
- Ad interim
- In office June 30, 2022 – October 4, 2022
- President: Bongbong Marcos
- Preceded by: Martin Andanar (PCOO Secretary and Acting Presidential Spokesperson)
- Succeeded by: Cheloy Garafil (OIC/PCO Secretary)

Personal details
- Born: Rose Beatrix Laviña Cruz; 29 March 1965 (age 61) Manila, Philippines
- Education: University of the Philippines Diliman (A.B, LL.B)
- Profession: Lawyer; Vlogger

YouTube information
- Channel: Luminous by TCA & AGP
- Subscribers: 168 thousand
- Views: 27.4 million
- Last updated: July 6, 2025

Rose Beatrix "Trixie" Cruz-Angeles (born 29 March 1965) is a Filipino lawyer and vlogger who served as Press Secretary of the Philippines from June 30, 2022, until October 4, 2022.

== Education ==
Cruz-Angeles attended the University of the Philippines Diliman (UP) where she obtained a law degree in 1997. As of 2022, she is also pursuing an international relations degree at the University of Minnesota in the United States and a master's degree in archeology in UP.

== Career ==
=== Government ===
From July 2017 to 2018, Cruz-Angeles was part of the Presidential Communications Operations Office (PCOO) as a social media strategist during the administration of President Rodrigo Duterte.

Cruz-Angeles is set to return to the PCOO when she was designated by President-elect Bongbong Marcos to lead the communications body as the Press Secretary once Marcos assume the presidency.

The appointment was despite her being a former critic of the Marcos family, remarking how no member has been made accountable of a crime after the People Power Revolution of 1986. She has also called for the imprisonment of former First Lady Imelda Marcos to be jailed in 2013 and justice for the assassination of Benigno Aquino Jr. She acknowledged that her stance towards the Marcoses has changed.

Cruz-Angeles had resigned from her post on October 4, 2022, citing health reasons, only having served 96 days as press secretary. She was replaced by Atty. Cheloy Garafil as the Officer-in-Charge and eventually as full-fledged Chief of the Presidential Communications Office.

=== Legal career ===
As a lawyer, Cruz-Angeles had members of the Magdalo Group and former Iglesia ni Cristo worker Lowell Menorca as among her high-profile clients. She defended the Magdalo Group for their involvement a coup d'état attempt against the administration of President Gloria Macapagal Arroyo in the Oakwood mutiny in 2003. Menorca on his part was allegedly detained by his church at the height of a leadership controversy in 2015.

In 2016, the Supreme Court of the Philippines imposed a suspension against her for three years for violating the Code of Professional Responsibility. A client sued her for failing to process his annulment case despite payment of legal fees. Cruz-Angeles maintained she was not remiss in fulfilling her duties adding that the client failed to provide the address of his estranged wife and present sufficient evidence.

=== Other ===
Cruz-Angeles is a vlogger. She maintains the vlog "Luminous by Trixie Cruz-Angeles & Ahmed Paglinawan” which has 406,000 followers in Facebook as of 2022 and more than 100,000 subscribers in YouTube. She was also a host in the radio program Karambola on DWIZ from 2018 to May 2022.

On February 3, 2024, during her livestream, she confirmed that she was removed from Karambola without disclosing the reason.

She was a publisher for the website Politiko and a columnist at the Philippine Daily Inquirer. She was also a lecturer at the Ateneo de Manila University and the Institute for Cultural and Arts Management.

Political offices
| Preceded by Martin Andanar | Press Secretary; 2022 | Succeeded by Cheloy Garafil as Secretary of the Presidential Communications Office |
