= List of Minute to Win It (Philippine game show) episodes and contestants =

In the game show Minute to Win It aired on ABS-CBN, Most of the time, celebrities are invited to play in the show. Non-celebrities were also able to play in the show, but only after they passed the auditions. Special editions are also held for different age groups, and professions.

== Regular episodes ==
The Money board of Minute to Win It
Level	Prize value
10	₱1,000,000
9	₱ 500,000
8	₱ 250,000
7	₱ 150,000
6	₱ 100,000
5	₱ 75,000
4	₱ 50,000
3	₱ 25,000
2	₱ 10,000
1	₱ 5,000
NOTE: Gold background indicates jackpot prize; green backgrounds indicates safe levels.

Prize won	Contestants	
Prize won	Celebrities	Non-celebrities
₱ 5,000	Cristine Reyes; K Brosas; Sam Concepcion; Pooh Garcia; Chef Lau Laudicio; KZ Tandingan; Erik Santos; Nikki Gil; Arnel Pineda; Georgina Wilson; Gary Valenciano; Mitoy & Mylo Yonting	Greta Cordillo; Nadja Mirpuri
₱ 75,000	Ai-Ai de las Alas; Rico J. Puno; Maja Salvador; Shamcey Supsup; Janine Tugonon; Kean Cipriano; Keanna Reeves; Andrew Wolff; Bianca Manalo; John Prats; Julius Babao; Jessy Mendiola; Denise Laurel; Enrique Gil; Iya Villania; Robi Domingo; Matt Evans; Ogie Diaz; Sarah Geronimo; KC Concepcion; Ariella Arida; Piolo Pascual & Toni Gonzaga	Janelle Balboa; Misty Rose Dado; Mario Ripoll; James Asuncion
₱ 150,000	Marlann Flores; Angel Locsin	None
₱ 250,000	Zanjoe Marudo; Melai Cantiveros; Andrew E.; Martin Nievera; Matteo Guidicelli; Chieffy Caligdong; Arwind Santos; Ella Cruz; Jericho Rosales; Gerald Anderson; Arnel Aba; Maricar Reyes; Angeline Quinto	Anthon Miccolo Solis
₱ 500,000	Julia Montes; Pokwang; John Estrada; John Lloyd Cruz; Luis Manzano	None

== Teen Challenge episodes ==
Prize won	Contestants	
Prize won	Celebrities	Non-celebrities
₱ 5,000	Joj & Jai Agpangan; Julia Barretto	None
₱ 75,000	Kathryn Bernardo; Daniel Padilla; Khalil Ramos; Sharlene San Pedro & Nash Aguas	Mariz Uytingco & Marc Quiambao; Dareen Aguilar; Jhade Telimban; Koi Nombre
₱ 100,000	None	Prances Jane Clemente
₱ 250,000	Ella Cruz; Janella Salvador & Jerome Ponce; Makisig Morales; Cris "Kesz" Valdez	Kenji & Yuji dela Cruz

== Junior episodes ==
Contestant names in bold indicate celebrities or prominent players.

Red team				Blue team			
Contestants	Points	Prize won		Prize won		Points	Contestants
Contestants	Points	Cash	Special prizes	Special prizes	Cash	Points	Contestants
**Zaijian Jaranilla**; **Xyriel Manabat**	**75**	**₱ 75,000**	PS3; Laptop; Electric scooter	Toy collection; Family getaway (Palawan)	None	35	**Bugoy Cariño**; **Brenna Garcia**
Ivy Napila; Alexis Ocumen	25	None	Remote control cars	Nintendo DS Lite; Family vacation (Plantation Bay, Cebu)	**₱ 75,000**	**50**	Euseph Cueto; Jordan Veniegas
Maxene Sumalinog; Tana Timkang	**75**	**₱ 75,000**	PSP 3000; Bike; iPad mini; Trip to Hong Kong Disneyland	Kiddie pool set	None	50	JM Carandang; Shariv Castillo
Miles Borabon; John Bermundo	**40**	**₱ 75,000**	Wii; Timezone arcade prepaid card (worth ₱5,000)	Sports set; iPod Touch (4th Generation)	None	35	Vianca Martinez; Miho Hoshino
Jeham Ampuan; Nazeem Macasilang	60	None	Eat-all-you-can buffet (5 for each player); BMX bike	Remote control cars; PSVita Touch; Trip to Legoland Malaysia	**₱ 500,000**	**75**	Rhopert Rael; Lorenzo Santua
Jeyobb Gamboa; Vince Calingasan	30	None	Headphones (Beats by Dr. Dre); Trip to Splash Island for 10 per player	Digital camera (ViviCam F529, 14.1 megapixels); Family vacation (Misibis Bay Resort and Casino)	**₱ 75,000**	**40**	Jan Mikaela Sison; Kristine Sison
Von Domingo; Yuki Cruz	**55**	**₱ 75,000**	Toy collection; Nintendo DS Lite; Swimming set	Trip to Bangkok	None	50	Creed Berces; Luira Berces
**Maliksi Morales**; **Deydey Amansec**	20	None	None	iPod Nano; Remote control helicopter; XBox 360 Kinect; Digital camera (ViviCam F529, 14.1 megapixels)	**₱ 75,000**	**50**	**Izzy Canillo**; **Aaron Junatas**
Mary Glenn Pael; Jenna Mae Perez	50	None	1 iPad mini for each player	Headphones (Beats by Dr. Dre); Shopping gift certificate (worth ₱5,000 each); 5 cellphones for each player; Family vacation (Boracay)	**₱ 75,000**	**60**	Emee Dy; Buffy Cloma
Juan Carlos Urquico; Juan Miguel Urquico	**20**	**₱ 75,000**	Portable videoke machine	Backpacks (JanSport)	None	15	Allysa Arceo; Allyana Arceo
**Carl Camo**; **Belle Mariano**	**30**	**₱ 75,000**	Tablet with TV (Coby)	Rubber shoes	None	10	**Barbie Sabino**; **Miguel de Guzman**
Vicky Martel; Yna Carreon	40	None	Digital camera (Olympus VH-210, 14 megapixels)	Backpacks (JanSport); Shopping gift certificate (worth ₱5,000 each); iPad (4th generation)	**₱ 75,000**	**50**	Harlyn Bernabe; Joy Samson
Nikko Virtucio; Angelo Cayabyab	25	None	Rubber shoes (Nike)	Quantum arcade prepaid card (worth ₱5,000 each); Weekend stay in a 5-star hotel; XBox 360 Kinect	**₱ 75,000**	**70**	Karl Co; Jason Tan
Keesha Lopez; Brian Anupol	40	None	Sports watches (Skechers); iPad (4th generation)	PSP 3000	**₱ 75,000**	**45**	Kyle Valenzuela; Kasz Mañalac
Jacob Cortez; Raoul Rufino	**40**	**₱ 75,000**	Headphones (Philips O'Neill The Bend); iPad mini	Rubber shoes (Nike)	None	25	Ice Blanco; Baffy Acot
BJ Buyon; Nicky Lago	15	None	Trip to Enchanted Kingdom (10 for each player)	Sports set; PSP 3000; iPad (4th generation); Trip to Universal Studios Singapore	**₱ 500,000**	**75**	Ian Panis; Kevin Balat
Sherwin Parias; **Ronron Villar**	30	**₱ 75,000**	**Sneakers (Vans)**; **Laptop (Redfox)**	Headphones (Beats by Dr. Dre)	None	30	Francis "Kiko" Ramirez; Miguel Felinio
Xian Aguilar; Cherry Astillas	**50**	**₱ 75,000**	Goodies bag; iPod Touch; Rollerblades; Netbook (IdeaPad)	None	None	30	Jieimi Morishita; Akira Morishita
John Rick Villafuerte; Miel Agustin	65	**₱ 75,000**	**Eat-all-you-can buffet (5 for each player)**; **Sports watches (Skechers)**; **Trip to Night Safari, Singapore**	Digital camera (Olympus VH-210, 14 megapixels)	None	65	Elaisa Cinco; Peach Lee
**JM Ibañez**; **Mutya Orquia**	**65**	**₱ 75,000**	PSVita; Laptop (Acer)	Doll set for girls / sports set for boys; Family vacation (Boracay)	**₱ 5,000**	45	**Bea Basa**; **Clarence Delgado**
JP Velasco; Paul Velasco	15	**₱ 5,000**	None	All-day access at Mind Museum for 10; Nintendo DSi XL; XBox 360 Kinect	**₱ 75,000**	**40**	Toni Noel; Angela Esluzar
**Chacha Cañete**; **Harvey Bautista**	25	**₱ 5,000**	Smart camera with Wi-Fi (Samsung ST150F)	Folding bike; iPad mini; Family getaway (Puerto Princesa, Palawan)	**₱ 75,000**	**65**	**Kyle Banzon**; **Bianca Bentulan**
**Andrea Brillantes**; **Nathaniel Britt**	**70**	**₱ 75,000**	Family weekend at Ace Water Spa; iPad (4th generation)	Headphones (Pioneer); Harry Potter books; PSP 3000	**₱ 5,000**	50	**Kyline Alcantara**; **Dale Baldillo**
Martha Montemayor; Pia Ildefonso	**70**	**₱ 75,000**	Tablets (Torque); Waterproof camera (Olympus Tough TG-320); Trip to Night Safari, Singapore	Shopping gift certificate (worth ₱5,000 each); Desktop Computer (Redfox)	**₱ 5,000**	50	Justine Mantal; Revelyn Dela Cruz
**Quintin Alianza**; **Joaquin Reyes**	**75**	**₱ 75,000**	Skateboards (Real, Krooked); PSP 3000; Wii	Remote control cars; Laptop (Acer)	**₱ 5,000**	60	**John Bermundo**; **Grae Fernandez**
**Sofia Millares**; **Veyda Inoval**	40	**₱ 5,000**	Wii	Remote control helicopter; All-day access at Mind Museum; iPad (4th generation); Family vacation (Boracay)	**₱ 75,000**	**60**	**Lance Lucido**; **CX Navarro**
**Fordy Espiritu**; **Tyler Yap**	**50**	**₱ 75,000**	Nintendo DSi XL; Family getaway (Puerto Princesa, Palawan)	Timezone arcade prepaid card (worth ₱5,000); Instant camera (Fujifilm Instax Mini 7S)	**₱ 5,000**	15	**Julia Base**; **Abby Bautista**
JM Abonalla; Janna Abonalla	15	**₱ 75,000**	**Moose Gear apparel**; **Backpacks (JanSport)**	None	**₱ 5,000**	15	**Sean Gabriel Alejandrino**; **Raveena Mansukhani**
Chodri Pableo; Leru Pableo	**30**	**₱ 75,000**	Rubber shoes; Laptop (Redfox)	Toy robots (Transformers)	**₱ 5,000**	15	Lois Factolaren; Sergei Cabayao
Ethan Jao; Kian Chua	25	**₱ 5,000**	Tickets for Cinderella musical at Resorts World Manila (consolation prize)	BMX bike; Tablet (Skyworth S73); PS3; Vacation package in Subic Bay	**₱ 75,000**	**70**	Kathlyn Reyes; Khylla Reyes
Charles Dennis Ortula; Jasper San Juan	**40**	**₱ 75,000**	Trip for 3 at Manila Ocean Park; iPad (4th generation)	XBox 360 Kinect	**₱ 5,000**	15	**Justine Navarro**; **JM Andres**
**Allyson McBride**; **Ashley Sarmiento**	0	**₱ 5,000**	Tickets for Cinderella musical at Resorts World Manila (consolation prize)	Lego package; 3-wheel electric scooter; iPod Touch (4th Generation); Trip to Ocean Park Hong Kong	**₱ 75,000**	**60**	**Macky Billones**; **JB Agustin**
Zion Genona; Rhenald Villorente	**75**	**₱ 575,000**	Moose Gear apparel; Skateboards (Real, Krooked); iPad mini; Trip to Genting Park Malaysia	Sports set	**₱ 5,000**	45	Justin Tomeldon; France Dela Cruz
Hannah Erika Valenzuela; **Nourish Icon Lapuz**	20	**₱ 5,000**	Tickets for Cinderella musical at Resorts World Manila (consolation prize)	**Headphones (Skullcandy Hesh 2 - Thunder and Celtics)**; **Electronic go-kart**	**₱ 75,000**	20	Patrick Taguinod; Alled Samonte
Ellysa Dimaculangan; Nicole Panaun	40	**₱ 5,000**	Moose Gear apparel; iPad (4th generation); 6 tickets for Cinderella musical at Resorts World Manila (consolation prize)	Trip to Enchanted Kingdom for 10; Rubber shoes (Nike); Skyworth LED internet TV	**₱ 75,000**	**70**	Jhaystin Perez; Jaytherd Perez
Althea Bautista; Leela Villaruz	**30**	**₱ 75,000**	Moose Gear apparel; Tablets (Torque); School supplies with Hawk trolley bag	Trip to Thailand	**₱ 5,000**	25	**Dome Ramos**; **Sol de Guzman**
Ron Edoria; Jay-R Edoria	50	**₱ 5,000**	Mountain bike; iPad Air	Trip to Clark Dinosaur Island for 10; HD digital camcorder (Hewlett-Packard t200); Trip to Legoland Malaysia	**₱ 75,000**	**75**	Einstein Aguviva; Luis Aguviva
Mico de Jesus; Ronel Allawan	30	**₱ 5,000**	Avengers action figure; Star City ride-all-you-can tickets for 12	Tablet (Skyworth S73); Sports apparel and Nike rubber shoes	**₱ 75,000**	**50**	Eman Losañez; Dirk Bantilan
Rissa Mae Bado; John Rey Bandojo	75	**₱ 75,000**	**School supplies with trolley bag**; **Grocery package (worth ₱ 10,000)**; **Laptop (Acer Aspire V5)**; **Vacation package in Subic Bay**	Pamporma package with brand new rubber shoes	**₱ 20,000**	75	Joserie Olandria; Shayne Olandria
**Jappy Mercado**; **R.A. Laurito**	20	**₱ 5,000**	Folding bike	Trip to Enchanted Kingdom (10 for each player); Tablets (Torque)	**₱ 75,000**	**30**	Jerico Orsal; Jomel Gervacio
**Sean Samonte**; **Kyle Jimenez**	**30**	**₱ 75,000**	Headphones (Skullcandy Hesh 2 - Thunder and Celtics); Sports set	HD digital camcorder (Hewlett-Packard t200)	**₱ 5,000**	25	**Deyniel Acacio**; **Kris Calderon**
Jeff-Jeff Orga; Sonny Balde	50	**₱ 30,000**	Pamporma package; Nochebuena package	MP3 player with headset and speakers; Star City ride-all-you-can tickets for 10; iPad (4th generation); Skyworth LED internet TV; Construction package; Pamporma package; Nochebuena package	**₱ 105,000**	**75**	Cymond Lapuz; Richmond Quiapo
John Paul Tepait; Ma. Cristina Belen	**75**	**₱ 75,000**	Brand new pedicab; Eureka home appliance showcase; Sari-sari store package; Pamporma package; Nochebuena package	Trip to Enchanted Kingdom (10 for each player); Laptop (Acer Aspire V5-132)	**₱ 20,000**	50	John Icon Reyes; Mark Cedrick Reyes
Aubrey Costillas; Ivan Valles	**60**	**₱ 75,000**	School supplies with trolley bag; Christmas party package; Pamporma package; Nochebuena package	Tablet (Skyworth S73); Grocery package (worth ₱ 10,000); Netbook	**₱ 20,000**	50	Jade Marie Golres; Jayjay Ventura
**Xyriel Manabat**; Tin-tin Grado	40	**₱ 20,000**	Trip to Hong Kong Disneyland	3 days and 2 nights at 5-star hotel; ABS-CBN mobile phone kit; 32-inch LED TV	**₱ 75,000**	**55**	**Zaijian Jaranilla**; Benedict Largo
Romeo Mergal; Rose Angel Romawae	**60**	**₱ 575,000**	Folding bike; Shopping spree (worth ₱ 10,000); iPad mini; Family vacation (Tagaytay); Pamporma package; Nochebuena package	10 cellphones (Torque); Pamporma package; Nochebuena package	**₱ 20,000**	55	Kyle Jean "Daday" de Paz; Lovely Ann "Diday" Leonido
Sonny Boy Buhain; Junnie Domingo	**60**	**₱ 75,000**	Rubber shoes; Grocery package (worth ₱ 30,000)	BMX bike; 32-inch LED TV	**₱ 20,000**	25	John Paul Mercado; Jomar Awitin

== Head to Head Challenge episode ==
The Money board of Head to Head Challenge
	Level	Prize value
Winning team	5	₱ 1,000,000
Winning team	4	₱ 500,000
Winning team	3	₱ 250,000
Winning team	2	₱ 150,000
Winning team	1	₱ 100,000
Winning team	Initial prize	₱ 75,000
Losing Team		₱ 5,000
NOTE: **Gold background** indicates jackpot prize; **green backgrounds** indicates safe levels.

Contestant names in bold indicate celebrities or prominent players.

Contestants	Points	Prize won	Prize won	Points	Contestants
**Kim Chiu**; Lakam Chiu	3	₱ 5,000	₱ 75,000	**4**	**Toni Gonzaga**; **Alex Gonzaga**
Ray-ann Daz; Ronel Osorio	3	₱ 5,000	₱ 150,000	**4**	Camille Mendoza; Cha-cha Mendoza
Evelyn Gillego; Arlene Gillego	2	₱ 5,000	₱ 75,000	**4**	Maria Anna Guadalupe; Giselle Resuelo-alonzo
Leo Alfar; Grace Nobio	1	₱ 5,000	₱ 75,000	**4**	Hiro Gumaro; Katherine San Juan
Paolo Porciuncula; Chok Porciuncula	**4**	₱ 250,000	₱ 5,000	0	**Kevin Balot**; **Ping Argos**
**Dennis Padilla**; **Bayani Agbayani**	2	₱ 5,000	₱ 100,000	**4**	**Ara Arida**; **Mutya Datul**
Arnel Layson; Socratis Pasaol	2	₱ 5,000	₱ 75,000	**4**	Jeangerlyn Aquino; Karen Limuaco
Roy Rubenecia; Kiana Rubenecia	**4**	₱ 75,000	₱ 5,000	3	Grace Casolita; Mikkei Casolita
Christopher Villaflores; JR Gordova	**4**	₱ 150,000	₱ 5,000	3	PO1 Aidie Castro; PO2 Carmi Camisera
**Mark McMahon**; **Charlie Sutcliffe**	**4**	₱ 75,000	₱ 5,000	1	**Nicole Donesa**; **Angelica Alita**
Zelle Naniong; Louizze Naniong	1	₱ 5,000	₱ 75,000	**4**	Mariz Reyes; Marvin Reyes
Precious Reglos; Dana Alcaide	**4**	₱ 75,000	₱ 5,000	2	**Precious Paramio**; **Shyrmain Macaso**
Gertrud Hahn; Mems Tagle	1	₱ 5,000	₱ 75,000	**4**	EJ Domingo; Robert Usita
Fr. Junie Maralit; Fr. Daks Ramos	**4**	₱ 500,000	₱ 5,000	2	Fr. Joey Irlandes; Fr. Rey Gella
**Ejay Falcon**; **Yam Concepcion**	2	₱ 5,000	₱ 75,000	**4**	**Arjo Atayde**; **Sunshine Cruz**
**Jason Gainza**; **Ryan Bang**	3	₱ 5,000	₱ 250,000	**4**	**Vandolph Quizon**; **Epi Quizon**
Anabel Dela Cruz; Marites Serrano	3	₱ 5,000	₱ 75,000	**4**	Agusto Aclopen; Sarah Lacbong
**Jahziel Manabat**; **Jem Milton**	**4**	₱ 75,000	₱ 5,000	1	**Alora Sasam**; **Karen Dematera**
**Ryan Araña**; **Simon Atkins**	**4**	₱ 75,000	₱ 5,000	3	**Nelson Asaytono**; **Marlou Aquino**
**Glen Sibonga**; **Demai Granali**	2	₱ 5,000	₱ 75,000	**4**	**Popoy Bibo**; **Eva Ronda**
**Nadia Montenegro**; **Ynna Asistio**	**4**	₱ 150,000	₱ 5,000	2	**Melanie Marquez**; **Michelle Dee**
**Jenny Zara**; **Jazztine Macasaet**	**4**	₱ 250,000	₱ 5,000	2	**Roda King**; **Ali Khatibi**
Chico Gonzales; Tita Chris Cabral	0	₱ 5,000	₱ 250,000	**4**	**RR Enriquez**; **Rufa Mi**
**Mark Sangiao**; **Eduard Folayang**	**4**	₱ 75,000	₱ 5,000	3	**Nomer Lasala**; **Carl Quion**
**Tart Carlos (as Doris)**; **Vivieka Ravanes (as Sabel)**	1	₱ 5,000	₱ 75,000	**4**	**Fabio Ide**; **Daniel Matsunaga**
**Mitch Valdez**; **Rufa Mae Quinto**	1	₱ 5,000	₱ 75,000	**4**	**Candy Pangilinan**; **John Lapus**
**Dawn Zulueta**	3	₱ 5,000	₱ 250,000	**4**	**Richard Gomez**

Contestants	Prize won		Prize won		Contestants
Contestants	Head-to-head rounds	Ultimate challenge	Ultimate challenge	Head-to-head rounds	Contestants
**Arron Villaflor**	**₱ 65,000**	None	None	₱ 40,000	**JC de Vera**
**Jake Letts**; **Harry Morris**	**₱ 90,000**	**₱ 100,000**	None	₱ 15,000	**Tado Jimenez**; **Ramon Bautista**
**Jeric Teng**	₱ 50,000	None	**₱ 100,000**	**₱ 55,000**	**Jeron Teng**
**Jake Cuenca**	₱ 10,000	None	None	**₱ 95,000**	**Cristine Reyes**
**Chokoleit**	₱ 10,000	None	None	**₱ 45,000**	**Kitkat**
**Joem Bascon**	₱ 15,000	None	None	**₱ 30,000**	**Jason Abalos**
**Ellen Adarna**	₱ 10,000	None	None	**₱ 90,000**	**Neggy**
**Crystal Brosas**; **Mae Subong**	**₱ 70,000**	**₱ 100,000**	None	₱ 35,000	**K Brosas**; **Pokwang**
**Randy Santiago**	**₱ 30,000**	**₱ 100,000**	None	₱ 25,000	**Rico J. Puno**
**Erich Gonzales**	₱ 20,000	None	**₱ 100,000**	**₱ 60,000**	**Enchong Dee**
**Noreen Wage**; **Loren Monares**	₱ 50,000 (1 game)	None	**₱ 250,000**	₱ 50,000 **(3 games)**	**Kenneth Bryan "Rabbit" Lagoy**; **Melody Grace "Kittie" King**
**Georcelle Dapat-Sy**	**₱ 80,000**	**₱ 250,000**	None	₱ 25,000	**Rayver Cruz**
**Gil Morales**	₱ 45,000	None	**₱ 100,000**	**₱ 60,000**	**Jon Santos**
**Regine Tolentino**	₱ 15,000 **(2 games)**	**₱ 100,000**	None	₱ 15,000 (1 game)	**Aubrey Miles**
Jonathan Montano; Joselito Fermo	₱ 20,000	None	None	**₱ 85,000**	Rolando Cui; Ronnie Cui
Johners; Molotov	**₱ 55,000**	**₱ 100,000**	None	₱ 50,000	JR; Ido
**Myrtle Sarrosa**	**₱ 95,000**	None	None	₱ 10,000	**Alodia Gosiengfiao**
Bong Baniqued; Ghel Lerpido	**₱ 85,000**	None	None	₱ 20,000	Chrissy Bendon; Gerald "Jodi" Guillermo
Tags Tagacay; Rain Balibalos	**₱ 80,000**	**₱ 100,000**	None	₱ 25,000	Anjie Gogna; Lala Dinglasan
**Valerie Concepcion**	₱ 5,000	None	None	**₱ 85,000**	**Empoy Marquez**
**Tutti Caringal**	**₱ 55,000**	None	None	₱ 15,000	**Yeng Constantino**
**Vannah Rodrigo**; **Barbie Arsolo**	₱ 15,000	None	**₱ 1,000,000**	**₱ 90,000**	**Tristan Encarnacion**; **Nino Logarta**
**Alyssa Alano**	**₱ 105,000**	None	None	None	**Daiana Menezes**
**Aiko Climaco**; **Thomas Torres**	**₱ 55,000**	**₱ 100,000**	None	None	**Jef Gaitan**; **Arnold van Opstal**
**Jaysel Arrozal**; **Avonlea Paraiso**; **Nikita Pia McElroy**	₱ 15,000	None	None	**₱ 40,000**	**Angel**; **Mariko**; **Mia**
**Eric "Eruption" Tai**	**₱ 90,000**	None	None	₱ 5,000	**Ryan Bang**
Sr. Diwari Laurio; Sr. Angelica Bolor	**₱ 70,000**	**₱ 500,000**	None	None	Sr. Ruth Baguinon; Sr. Cecille Dolosa
**Robi Domingo**	**₱ 45,000**	None	None	₱ 10,000	**Matteo Guidicelli**
**Benjie Paras**	₱ 5,000	None	None	**₱ 100,000**	**Ian Veneracion**
**Gerry Peñalosa**; **JC Peñalosa**	**₱ 50,000**	**₱ 1,000,000**	None	₱ 35,000	**Alvin Teng**; **Jeron Teng**

=== Family and Team Challenge episodes ===
The Money board of Family and Team Challenge edition
Head-to-head rounds
Level	Prize gain
5	₱ 50,000
4	₱ 25,000
3	₱ 15,000
2	₱ 10,000
1	₱ 5,000
Ultimate challenge
**Number of members** **completing the challenge**	**Prize gain**
4	₱ 1,000,000
3	₱ 500,000
2	₱ 250,000
1	₱ 100,000
NOTE: **Gold background** indicates jackpot prize.

Contestant names in bold indicate celebrities or prominent players.

Contestants	Prize won		Prize won		Contestants
Contestants	Head-to-head rounds	Ultimate challenge	Ultimate challenge	Head-to-head rounds	Contestants
**Rez Cortez**; **Candy Cortez**; **Xavee Cortez**; **Cai Cortez**	₱ 35,000	None	**₱ 100,000**	**₱ 70,000**	**Tirso Cruz**; **Djanin Cruz**; **Bodie Cruz**; **Tope Ynchausti**
**Joey Marquez**; **Yeoj Marquez**; **VJ Marquez**; **Rain**	**₱ 70,000**	**₱ 500,000**	None	₱ 25,000	**Ruffa Gutierrez**; **Monching Gutierrez**; **Ralph**; **Jessica**
**Jon Supan**; **Jason Zamora**; **Mark Flores**; **Jojo Zafra**	None	None	None	**₱ 40,000**	**James Salas**; **Jim Salas**; **Wowie de Guzman**; **Marco McKinley**
**Nene Tamayo**; **Franzen Fajardo**; **Rico Barrera**; **Say Alonzo**	**₱ 70,000**	None	None	None	**Melissa Ricks**; **Raphael Martinez**; **Joseph Bitangcol**; **Joross Gamboa**
**Teddy Corpuz**; **Christian Sindico**; **Juven Pelingon**; **Jeff Cucullo**	**₱ 50,000**	None	None	₱ 45,000	**Jugs Jugueta**; **Jazz Nicolas**; **Kelvin Yu**; **Chino Singson**
**Jopay Paguia**; **Aira Bermudez**; **Louise Bolton**; **Sunshine Garcia**	**₱ 90,000**	None	None	₱ 15,000	**Kristine Jaca**; **Jennifer Lee**; **Jaycee Parker**; **Gwen Garci**
**Jessica Reynoso**; **Penelope Matanguihan**; **Janice Javier**; **Thor Dulay**	**₱ 80,000**	None	None	None	**Diday Garcellano**; **Darryl Shy**; **Radha Cuadrado**; **Mitoy Yonting**
**Kit Thompson**; **Alexander Diaz**; **Jon Lucas**; **Julian Estrada**	**₱ 75,000**	**₱ 500,000**	None	₱ 5,000	**Julia Barretto**; **Liza Soberano**; **Ingrid de la Paz**; **Michelle Vito**
**Wacky Kiray**; **Atak**; Led Sobrepeña III; **Lassy**	None	None	None	**₱ 30,000**	**Kitkat**; **Minnie Aguilar**; **Dang Cruz**; **Rubi Rubi**
**Klarisse de Guzman**; **Eva delos Santos**; **Morissette**; **Maki Ricafort**	**₱ 50,000**	**₱ 250,000**	None	₱ 5,000	**Myk Perez**; **Lee Grane Maranan**; **Isabella Fabregas**; **Paolo Onesa**
**Lareine Caca**; **Jennica Ollero**; **Jannie Alipo-on**; **Ahlex Moreno**	**₱ 50,000**	None	None	₱ 40,000	**Archie Alemania**; **Jeff Tan**; **Isko Salvador (as Brod Pete)**; **Gerard Acao**
**Jay Durias**; **Vince Alaras**; **Manuel Tabunar**; **Benjie Mendez**	**₱ 60,000**	**₱ 250,000**	None	₱ 20,000	**Vic Aquino**; **Bob Cañamo**; **Rye Sarmiento**; **Tutti Caringal**
**KZ Tandingan**; **Allen Sta. Maria**; **Allan Mitchell Silonga**; **Herbert Silonga**	₱ 10,000	None	**₱ 250,000**	**₱ 95,000**	**Ronnie Liang**; **Miguel Mendoza**; **Bugoy Drilon**; **Liezel Garcia**
**Marina Benipayo**; **Lou Bunyi**; **Jennifer Barrientos**; **Venus Raj**	**₱ 40,000**	**₱ 250,000**	None	None	**Rene Salud**; **Frederick Peralta**; **Albert Andara**; **Ronalo Armaldo**
**Marlon "Loonie" Peroramas**; **Abra**; **Smugglaz**; **Ron Henley**	₱ 5,000	None	None	**₱ 25,000**	**Charlie Mack**; **Oman B.**; **Ben-Deatha**; **Madkillah**
**Bern Josep Persia (Bekimon)**; **Jamvhille Sebastian**; **Michelle Liggayu**; **Jireh Lim**	₱ 5,000	None	None	**₱ 40,000**	**Jovit Baldivino**; **Buildex Pagales**; **Ruther Urquia**; **Marcelito Pomoy**
**Tom Doromal**; **Yves Flores**; **Alec Dungo**; **Ryan Boyce**	**₱ 30,000**	**₱ 100,000**	None	₱ 25,000	**Joj Agpangan**; **Jai Agpangan**; **Myrtle Sarrosa**; **Karen Reyes**
**Ullyses Webb Basa**; **Biboy Chua Cabigon**; **Ranz Kyle Viniel E.**; **Clarence Adrian Villafuerte**	₱ 25,000	None	None	**₱ 80,000**	**Mocha Uson**; **Jhane Santiaguel**; **Francoise Denyse Fainsan**; **Mary Mae Dela Cerna**
**Natasha Mendoza**; **Espie Alano**; **Faye Cayab**; **Claudine Alano**	₱ 40,000	None	**₱ 100,000**	**₱ 50,000**	**Precious**; **Claire Cristobal**; **Nelson**; **Jovin**

== First anniversary special ==
Prize won	Contestants
₱ 75,000	Bea Rose Santiago
₱ 250,000	Sam Milby

Contestants	Prize won		Prize won		Contestants
Contestants	Head-to-head rounds	Ultimate challenge	Ultimate challenge	Head-to-head rounds	Contestants
Xian Lim	₱ 25,000	None	None	₱ 80,000	Kim Chiu
Fr. Junie Maralit; Fr. Daks Ramos	₱ 5,000	None	None	₱ 75,000	Ray-ann Daz; Ronel Osorio

=== Beat it to Win it winners on 60-Second Circle ===
Contestants	Challenge	Prize won
Paul Russel Galindo	Spoon Frog (6 spoons)	None
Marcison Samson	Don't Blow the Joker	₱ 20,000

== Other episodes ==
Edition	Prize won	Contestants
Ateneo vs. La Salle	₱ 5,000	Michelle Gumabao & Abigail Maraño (De La Salle Lady Archers)
Ateneo vs. La Salle	₱ 75,000	Gretchen Ho & Alyssa Valdez (Ateneo Lady Spikers)
Luis Manzano's; Birthday Special	₱ 5,000	Addie & Enzo Manzano; Vice Ganda
Luis Manzano's; Birthday Special	₱ 75,000	Alfonso Unarce & Ronald Estrella
Luis Manzano's; Birthday Special	₱ 250,000	Billy Crawford
For Yolanda Survivors	₱ 100,000	Martin Nievera; Arwind Santos; Ella Cruz; Joey Marquez; John Estrada; Chieffy Caligdong; Epi & Vandolph Quizon; Makisig Morales; Andrew E.; Gerald Anderson
