= Rigoberto Tiglao =

Filipino journalist

Presidential Spokesperson
- In office April 23, 2001 – 2002
- President: Gloria Macapagal-Arroyo
- Preceded by: Renato Corona

Personal details
- Born: Rigoberto Dikit Tiglao; August 27, 1952 (age 74)
- Spouse(s): Raquel Edralin (died 2001) Gethsemane Selirio (m. 2002)
- Children: 3 (with Edralin)
- Occupation: Columnist

Rigoberto "Bobi" Dikit Tiglao (born August 27, 1952) is a Filipino activist and opinion columnist.

He was previously editor-in-chief of Inq7.net, a website jointly owned by the Philippine Daily Inquirer and GMA Network before resigning his post to serve as Presidential Spokesperson and Chief of Staff (and later ambassador to Cyprus and Greece) during the administration of former Philippine President Gloria Macapagal-Arroyo. He now works as an opinion columnist for the Manila Times. A number of his claims have been fact-checked by multiple organizations.

== Career ==
=== Activism ===
Tiglao was an activist during the dictatorship of President Ferdinand Marcos. Tiglao was head of the Manila-Rizal chapter of the Communist Party of the Philippines. Tiglao was eventually caught along with his wife Raquel, and detained by Marcos' military forces, first at the 5th Constabulary Security Unit in Camp Crame and then at the Ipil Detention Center in Fort Bonifacio. He and his wife remained in detention for two years and were then let out on house arrest.

=== Journalism ===
He later became a reporter for Business Day from 1981 to 1986. He then served as business editor and columnist at the Manila Chronicle from 1986 to 1989.

In 1989, Tiglao was one of 9 journalists who founded the Philippine Center for Investigative Journalism (PCIJ), an independent nonprofit media agency specializing in investigative reporting. He was the one who first proposed the creation of the PCIJ, writing a paper on this during his fellowship in 1988 at the Neiman Foundation for Journalism at Harvard University and getting the idea after visiting the Center for Investigative Reporting in California. and he served as the PCIJ's treasurer in its earliest days, when it operated out of the PhP 1,000 chipped in by each of the founding members, and initial grants from The Asia Foundation and the Ford Foundation.

From 1989 to 2000, he served as the Manila bureau chief and correspondent for the Far Eastern Economic Review. He became president of the Foreign Correspondents’ Association of the Philippines (FOCAP) from 1997 to 1998.

Tiglao became a columnist at the Philippine Daily Inquirer from 2000 to 2002 and from 2010 to 2013. He was also former editor-in-chief of Inq7.net (now Inquirer.net), the website of the Philippine Daily Inquirer.

=== Government ===
A year after the death of his first wife Raquel, he accepted the offer of the role of Press Secretary under Gloria Macapagal-Arroyo - taking over the role from her first Press Secretary, Noel Cabrera, in April 2002. Tiglao subsequently moved on to the roles of Presidential Spokesman, Presidential Chief of Staff, then head of Presidential Management Staff.

Following his appointment as press secretary, Tiglao has shifted his views from centre-left to centre-right. Explaining his controversial decision to accept the post from Arroyo despite the reactions of his journalist colleagues, he explained his position saying: "My framework has changed. It is not a matter of being an apologist. I've realized that particularly with President Gloria Arroyo, we're out to build a nation,” and "She has a real vision of creating a strong country. She is out to build a real strong state and a strong sense of nationalism. This vision has to be articulated and repeated.”

He was eventually appointed by Pres. Arroyo as the Philippine Ambassador to Greece and Cyprus from 2006 to 2010. During the start of the Benigno Aquino III administration, Overseas Filipino Workers staged a protest in front of the Philippine Embassy in Athens, Greece to demand his removal due to accusations by them of "dismal performance and a lavish lifestyle". Tiglao declined to comment, stating that the matter was sensitive, and that he was on leave.

=== Return to journalism ===
In January 2013, Tiglao began writing for the Manila Times. During his work for the paper, his articles would be flagged by fact-checking bodies as false, a trend which would become increasingly notorious from time to time.

== Awards and recognition ==
Tiglao was awarded the Best News Reporter by the Catholic Mass Media Awards in 1983. In 1991, he was awarded Best Economic Journalist for Asia by Mitsubishi Foundation. In 1992, he was named one of The Outstanding Young Men of the Philippines for Print Journalism by the Philippine Jaycees.

From 1988 to 1989, he was a Nieman fellow at the Nieman Foundation for Journalism at Harvard University. In 2002, he became a fellow for the Center for Southeast Asia Studies at Kyoto University.

== Controversies and fact-checks ==
Since the early 2010s, there have been incidents where assertions by Tiglao have generated controversy, have been refuted, and some fact-checked. Governance and foreign policy analyst Steven Feldstein notes how Tiglao, along with RJ Nieto and Sass Rogando Sasot are part of the Philippines' network of digital repression. They also noted that some members of the public tend to dismiss fact-checks done by accredited journalists thanks to unverified claims from people and columnists like Tiglao, who has for example accused fact-checking organization Vera Files of being "a CIA-funded outfit."

- In March 2015, Tiglao made the claim that the Jabidah Massacre was the "biggest hoax foisted upon this nation" and that it was a story spun by the Liberal Party in 1968 as a propaganda weapon to fight Ferdinand Marcos's bid for reelection the following year. According to data by the Official Gazette, anywhere from 11 to 68 Moro soldiers were massacred because of their complaints via petition to Malacanang about unreceived stipends and terrible ration and living conditions in their camp. Contrary to Tiglao's statement, the Moro National Liberation Front (MNLF) commemorated the 51st anniversary of the Jabidah Massacre in 2019 that led to the creation of the MNLF. Tiglao's three-part series on this issue starting March 22, 2015 (“‘Jabidah’ was a big hoax”, Manila Times) and several articles were mainly based on the voluminous transcript of two congressional committees that investigated it in 1968, and partly on Senator Benigno Aquino, Jr.’s Senate privilege speech in which he said that he himself had talked in Jolo the Muslims reported to have been killed in Corregidor. Aquino, Benigno, "Jabidah! Special Forces of Evil?", Official Gazette of the Republic of the Philippines. In March 2015, the National Historical Commission chair Ma. Serena Diokno disclosed that her commission’s research could “not ascertain” if the alleged massacre actually occurred, only that “the reports of killings “of several members served as a fuse for the Muslim insurgency in the 1970s.Tiglao, Rigoberto, "National Historical Commission: No 'Jabidah'", The Manila Times
- In March 2017, Tiglao was called out by the Philippine Center for Investigative Journalism for claiming that a story they ran on Arthur Lascañas was false and managed by Senator Antonio Trillanes.
- In April 2018, Tiglao claimed that then vice president Leni Robredo had met with German members of the European Parliament to urge them to pass a resolution that called on the Philippines to end extrajudicial killings in the Philippine drug war. After Robredo called him out for spreading false claims about her Germany trip, Robredo stated on Twitter that he e-mailed her office "threatening to print more fake news."
- Shortly after, Tiglao published a column insinuating that Robredo was having an affair with lawmaker Jorge Banal. Robredo had already addressed this rumor as false in an interview with Karen Davila.
- Tiglao has repeatedly made the claim that receiving foreign grants and funds by Philippine media organizations is illegal and against the Constitution of the Philippines. According to journalists Shiela Coronel, Ellen Tordesillas and Antonio Montalvan II, what is prohibited is foreign ownership and management of media, not foreign funding and grants. Article XCI, Section 11 of the Constitution states that: "The ownership and management of mass media shall be limited to citizens of the Philippines, or to corporations, cooperatives or associations, wholly-owned and managed by such citizens." For example, Philippine state-run media entities under the Presidential Communications Group such as PTV-4, the Philippine News Agency, and Radyo ng Bayan receive foreign funding as well, such as from China. The Securities and Exchange Commission issued a ruling in 2018 and upheld in 2022, that the $1 million funds Rappler received from the US NGO Omidyar Network violated the Constitution's foreign equity restrictions in Mass Media, and ordered the Rappler as a corporation dissolved. Rappler though has appealed to the Supreme Court, with the case still pending.
- In April 2019, Tiglao stated that he was "100% certain" that Senator Antonio Trillanes and journalist Ellen Tordesillas were behind the Bikoy video plot, alleging that Tordesillas announced the Bikoy video a day early when Tordesillas posted on April 1 "Kung April Fools' ngayon, anong meron bukas? Abangan." (What's coming tomorrow? Watch out for it). In actuality, Tordesillas's post was a reference to April 2 being International Fact Checking Network day, and Vera Files which Tordesillas is president of is an accredited fact-checker.
- In 2019, Tiglao falsely claimed that the Palimbang massacre (also known as the Malisbong Massacre) was a hoax that was invented to get compensation from the Philippines’ Human Rights Violations Reparations Law. He repeated this claim in May 2022 in a Facebook comment to the Philippine Collegian. The Philippine Commission on Human Rights has acknowledged this incident since 2014, recognizing the mass murder of over 1,500 Muslim Moros by government troops during the regime of Ferdinand Marcos, Sr. in Sultan Kudarat. This is further supported by the Transitional Justice and Reconciliation Commission (TJRC) for the Bangsamoro Peace Process. The Armed Forces of the Philippines have also released a statement in 2021 acknowledging the importance of commemorating the massacre.
- In September 2020, journalist Ken Kashiwahara fact-checked Tiglao for stating that Ninoy Aquino was not a hero when Aquino's assassination is commemorated in the Philippines as "Ninoy Aquino Day" by law, and he is featured in Philippine currency. Tiglao also stated that Aquino, just before his assassination, filled his flight to the Philippines with media people from "practically every continent" when they came from only two. Furthermore, Tiglao spread the conspiracy theory that it was the CIA who organized and managed Aquino's trip back to the Philippines when it was Aquino and Kashiwahara who did so for months. Kashiwahara stated that President Ronald Reagan was a friend of Ferdinand Marcos and not Aquino and would not have allowed the CIA to assist his friend's foe. Tiglao also spread the lie that Aquino used a Malaysian passport to travel, when it was a fake Filipino one that Aquino used. Finally, Tiglao criticized Western media for not having the "balls" to prevent the military from taking Aquino off the plane just prior to his assassination when it was not journalists' role to do so.
- In December 2021, Tiglao claimed that former Philippine Foreign Affairs Secretary Albert del Rosario had dropped support for Leni Robredo's run for the 2022 Philippine presidential election. 1Sambayan, the electoral group co-convened by del Rosario, denied Tiglao's claim.
- In January 2022, Tiglao called for the purging of what he called "red reporters" and red-tagged the National Union of Journalists of the Philippines as a "red front" or sympathizers of rebels and communists. The NUJP called out his action as malicious and irresponsible.
- In March 2022, Tiglao claimed that The Philippine Star was wrong in reporting that former Vice President Leni Robredo was the most searched presidential candidate during the same time period. Tiglao had used a different data set and methodology than the one used by PhilStar.
- In May 2022, after being suspended from Facebook for making a post that went against Meta Platforms' community standards on fake news, Tiglao pushed without evidence that communists ("Reds") and Leni Robredo supporters ("Finks" - a reference to Robredo's pink movement campaign) controlled Facebook Philippines and its Philippine fact-checking partners (Vera Files and Rappler). Meta requires that all independent fact-checking partners be certified signatories of the International Fact-Checking Network at Poynter, which has a strong vetting process, including the requirements of being non-partisan, transparency of sources, funding, organization, and an open and honest policy on correcting errors.
- In March 2024, PressONE.ph tagged Tiglao's claim on a column that the Kingdom of Jesus Christ (KOJC) is the "second largest non-Catholic Christian church". While it concedes the claim of the KOJC having 5 million adherents can't be verified it pointed out data from the religious affiliation statistics from the 2020 census by the Philippine Statistics Authority which lists the Iglesia ni Cristo as the largest (with 2.8 million followers) and the Seventh-day Adventist Church as the second (with 862 thousand followers).

== Personal life ==
Tiglao was first married to Raquel "Rock" Edralin, a women's rights advocate. He had three children with her. He became a widower when Edralin died of breast cancer in February 2001. His second wife is Gethsemane "Getsy" Selirio on April 13, 2002, who was editor in chief of Inq-7.

== Published books ==
Tiglao has published three books under Akropolis, a publishing company that Tiglao founded.

- Colossal Deception: How Foreigners Control Our Telecoms Sector (2016)
- Debunked: Uncovering Hard Truths about EDSA, Martial Law, Marcos, Aquino, with a special section on the Duterte Presidency (2019)
- Debacle: The Aquino Regime's Scarborough Fiasco and the South China Sea Arbitration Deception (2022)
