= Sass Rogando Sasot =

Filipino blogger and activist

- Occupations: Activist, blogger
- Known for: Co-founder of Society of Trans Women of the Philippines (STRAP), For the Motherland blog, Diehard Duterte Supporters, disinformation

Sass Rogando Sasot is a China-based Filipino blogger and transgender rights activist who is a Diehard Duterte Supporter known for spreading disinformation. She is co-founder of the Society of Trans Women of the Philippines. She has been studying in China since 2023.

== Education ==
Sasot took up graduate studies at the Leiden University in the Netherlands. She has been based in Beijing, China since 2023, where she has been pursuing a doctorate degree in international relations as a beneficiary of the ASEAN-China Young Leaders Scholarship.

== Trans activism ==
In October 2002, Sasot along with three other trans women established the transgender rights organization, Trans and Gender Rights Advocates of the Philippines (STRAP; now Society of Trans Women of the Philippines)

== Vlogging and column ==
Sasot is known for being a supporter of former president Rodrigo Duterte or DDS (Diehard Duterte Supporter), a term embraced by the societal faction. She is a blogger and used to post political content on her Facebook page, For the Motherland until it was taken down by Meta in 2025.

Sasot was columnist for The Manila Times in 2017.

== Disinformation ==
Governance and foreign policy analyst Steven Feldstein notes how Sasot, along with RJ Nieto and Rigoberto Tiglao are part of the Philippines' network of digital repression. Stratbase ADR Institute's report, China's Information Warfare in the Philippines, states that Sasot has been flagged several times for spreading disinformation online.

- In the murder of the teenage student Kian delos Santos during Duterte's drug war, where a gun was planted on delos Santos by policemen, Sasot asserted that delos Santos used the gun in a firefight with the police, and that it was found on his left hand despite being right-handed because it could have slipped there. Delos Santos tested negative for gunpowder residue on both his hands.
- After Senator Risa Hontiveros mentioned reports that China's nuclear-capable bombers had landed in the South China Sea in 2018, Sasot accused Hontiveros of being stupid and being bakla ng taon (bakla of the year) because China has been a nuclear power since the 1950s, and that the Philippines has been in striking distance of China's nuclear weapons since then. China only developed nuclear weapons in the 1960s.
- In 2022, Sasot claimed that the Angat Buhay Foundation founded by Leni Robredo took sole credit for relief efforts in Ifugao after a landslide occurred. Angat Buhay actually recognized several groups that joined in the relief efforts, including the Philippine Army’s 54th Infantry Magilas Battalion, the Isabela-Quirino Development Council, and others.
- Sasot has accused of Cielo Magno for bribing legislators with billions to uncover the name "Mary Grace Piattos" for a House of Representatives inquiry on Vice President Sara Duterte's usage of confidential funds. Magno filed a cyber libel complaint against Sasot over "malicious, demeaning, and defamatory imputations". Sasot had been harassing Magno for months on social media. Magno also stated that she and her family continued to suffer from anxiety, mental anguish, and sleepless nights over Sasot’s posts.
- Sasot has been making multiple inaccurate claims on the West Philippine Sea and the South China Sea Arbitration.
- Sasot alleged Philippine Coast Guard spokesperson Rear Admiral Jay Tarriela has received money from House Speaker Martin Romualdez and a "talent fee" from the United States for defending the Philippine sovereignty claims in the South China Sea dispute. Sasot claimed that Tarriela received $4 million from the U.S. government, participated in a U.S. operation named "Project Atlantis", owned an expensive watch beyond his means, and accepted bags of money from Rep. Martin Romualdez. Tarriela filed a cyber libel case against her for the accusations.
- In 2023, PumaPodcast drew backlash from netizens for giving a "disinformation peddler", Sasot -- someone who "helped destroy...public spheres", a platform by guesting her on their podcast.
- In 2025, Sasot posted an image of Filipinos holding placards protesting Chinese products and also promoting Filipino businesses, while criticizing Vice Ganda. The image was actually AI-generated.
- In a Facebook post in July 2026, Sasot accused National Bureau of Investigation Director Melvin Matibag and his wife, Laguna 1st district representative Ann Matibag, of owning a mansion worth over $1 million in California. Matibag categorically denied the accusation in a press conference and showed that it was a case of mistaken identity; the mansion owners were different people. Days later, sasot deleted her Facebook post and issued an apology to Matibag and his wife.

== Political stances ==
Sasot professed to have started supporting Duterte in 2016. She has disputed characterization of Duterte as "anti-LGBT" stating how she was surprised on how local LGBT organisations in Davao City were advanced as early as 2001.

She also advocated for a less "antagonistic" approach in regards to Philippine foreign policy towards China. Sasot has condmned the United States and the United Nations for allegedly taking a more hardlined stance on Duterte's war on drugs compared to the Mexican drug war claiming that the latter is worse.

=== Russia and China alignment ===
A report by Internews, "Nexus of Manipulation: Anatomy of Influence Operations in the Philippines", which was done in partnership with MindaNews, The Philippine Star, PressOne.PH, Probe, Rappler, The Nerve, Doublethink Lab, and Qurium, outlined how Sasot disseminated narratives aligned with Russian and Chinese propaganda and stated the following:

- By 2019, A Russian disinformation network linked to the Internet Research Agency (IRA), a Russian company which engaged in online propaganda and influence operations, had penetrated Philippine social media. A key figure in spreading misleading claims was Adam Garrie, whose activities were connected by research of New Knowledge and a US Senate report to the broader Russian disinformation network. Garrie's views were disseminated by Sasot through her platform.
- Rappler and The Nerve have monitored a pro-China network that was spreading propaganda online to Filipino communities since 2016. "Pro-authoritarian, anti-liberal content" skewed favorably towards China was promoted by the network, led by the self-styled think-tank Integrated Development Studies Institute (IDSI), along with Sasot and social media personality Anna Malindog-Uy. The pro-China positions of Sasot and Malindog-Uy were given platforms by The Manila Times and SMNI.
- Sasot was also identified as one of the top actors promoting narratives which were justifying China's joint exploration in the exclusive economic zone of the Philippines.

A Carnegie Endowment for International Peace report has described Sasot as a "notable example" of a prominent pro-Duterte blogger disseminating false claims that challenged the Permanent Court of Arbitration's 2016 decision and aligned with China's arguments. Stratbase ADR Institute notes that Sasot's pro-China content has been funneled and propagated into hyperpartisan pro-China Facebook groups.

== Legal issues ==
RJ Nieto and Sasot were subject of a criminal complaint regarding the doxing of the identity of the blogger behind the Pinoy Ako Blog in 2017.

Jay Tarriela and Cielo Magno have also filed a cyber libel case against Sasot for her claims involving the two individuals.

In April 2025, Sasot was cited by House of Representatives of the Philippines Tri-Committee for contempt for repeated refusal to attend its hearings on digital disinformation despite being subpoenaed.

In July 2025, Senator Risa Hontiveros requested the National Bureau of Investigation to probe Sasot, Krizette Laureta Chu, Jay Sonza, Trixie Cruz Angeles, and Byron "Banat By" Cristobal for allegedly spreading a video of former senate probe witness Michael Maurillo who claimed that Hontiveros had given him 1 million pesos to falsely testify against Apollo Quiboloy.

== Personal life ==
Sasot is a transgender woman. Still presenting as a boy at the time, Sasot studied at a Roman Catholic boys' school where she had a boyfriend. Despite this, Sasot accounts that her lover sees her as a girl. At age 17, Sasot has put on the label "transsexual girl" to describe her gender identity. Sasot recounts on how her mother had a negative reception to her coming out. She attempted suicide in December 2000. She studied in the college department of the same boys' school for her tertiary studies.

== See also ==
- Fake news in the Philippines
- Diehard Duterte Supporters
- Mocha Uson
- RJ Nieto
