= Society of Trans Women of the Philippines =

Transgender rights organization

- Abbreviation: STRAP
- Formation: December 2002; 23 years ago
- Founded at: Metro Manila
- Formerly called: Society of Trans and Gender Rights Advocates of the Philippines (2002–2005); Society of Transsexual Women of the Philippines (2005–20XX)

The Society of Trans Women of the Philippines (STRAP) is a transgender rights organization based in the Philippines led by trans women.

== History ==
Four transgender women established the Society of Trans and Gender Rights Advocates of the Philippines (STRAP) in December 2002 in Manila. The group was active for a few years attracting membership from trans men, trans women, cross-dressers, and intersexed people before becoming dormant.

Three of the STRAP co-founders met again on May 20, 2005 deciding to narrow the group's focus on trans women's issues agreeing that STRAP's initial scope was too broad. The name of the organization was changed to "Society of Transsexual Women of the Philippines" to reflect this move.

It changed its name again to the "Society of Trans Women of the Philippines".

== Advocacy ==
STRAP has advocated the gender-recognition of transgender people's gender identity as well as the ability for them to be able to legally change their first names and sex marker on their birth certificates without the need for surgical modification of one's body. They also support the recognition of non-binary identities.

They began promoting the usage of the terms transpinay to refer to Filipina trans women and transpinoy for Filipino trans men in 2008. Transpinay is proposed as an alternative to bakla which is used to refer to assigned male at birth individuals who adopted traditionally feminine gender expression including trans women.

== International Participation ==
Sass Rogando Sasot one of the founding members was one of the panelist “Opposing grave Human Rights Violations on the basis of Sexual Orientation and Gender Identity” Thursday, December 10, 2009 at 1.15 p.m. – 2.45 p.m. ECOSOC Chamber, UN Headquarters, New York
