= Raquel Edralin-Tiglao =

Filipino activist and feminist counselor

- Born: Raquel Edralin; June 26, 1947; Manila, Philippines
- Died: February 28, 2001 (aged 53); Manila, Philippines
- Other names: Rock, Rocky
- Occupations: Activist, feminist counselor, women's rights advocate
- Organization(s): Kabataang Makabayan; Women's Crisis Center; Coalition Against Trafficking in Women–Asia Pacific
- Known for: First Quarter Storm activism; Women's Crisis Center
- Spouse: Rigoberto Tiglao
- Children: 3

Raquel "Rock" Edralin-Tiglao (June 26, 1947–February 28, 2001) was a Filipino activist, feminist counselor, and advocate for women subjected to gender-based violence. She participated in the student and labor movements associated with the First Quarter Storm, was imprisoned during the dictatorship of Ferdinand Marcos, and later co-founded and led the Women's Crisis Center in the Philippines.

Tiglao helped develop feminist counseling and crisis services for survivors of domestic abuse, rape, and other forms of violence against women. She also conducted training in other Asian countries. A feminist-counseling workshop she led in Indonesia in 1997 influenced the formation of the Savy Amira Women's Crisis Centre in Surabaya.

== Early life and education ==
Edralin was born on June 26, 1947 in Manila but spent much of her childhood in Mindanao, where her father was assigned through his work with the Bureau of Lands. Her mother was a nurse, and Edralin was one of eight children.

She enrolled in the University of the Philippines to study for an AB degree in psychology. She did not complete the degree. Her studies were first interrupted when she went underground after the declaration of martial law, and a later attempt to return to the university was abandoned because she was under military surveillance.

== Student and labor activism ==
During the late 1960s, Edralin joined Kabataang Makabayan, a militant nationalist youth organization, and became active in demonstrations against the administration of President Ferdinand Marcos. Friends and fellow activists began calling her "Rock" or "Rocky", a nickname associated with her reputation for courage during confrontations with police.

Edralin participated in the mass demonstrations of the First Quarter Storm in 1970. According to activist and journalist Rodel Rodis, she was a member of the ten-person secretariat of the Movement for a Democratic Philippines and was assigned responsibility for its finances.

Rodis described Edralin as a prominent participant in the demonstrations and recalled seeing a Metropolitan Command officer strike her during a protest outside Malacañang Palace. A photograph published during the period showed her embracing and attempting to protect another activist during a violent demonstration, according to a memorial account written by her husband.

Edralin also worked with women laborers. Bantayog ng mga Bayani credits her with helping organize some of the first unions of women workers in the Philippines in 1970. Filipino American activist Melinda Paras recalled working with Edralin in the organization of textile workers and in actions involving female secondary-school students.

Paras also identified Edralin as one of the organizers of an early International Women's Day march in the Philippines on March 8, 1971, together with Paras and activist Lorena Barros. Edralin and Paras had also participated in the Diliman Commune at the University of the Philippines in February 1971.

== Arrest and detention ==
After Marcos declared martial law in September 1972, Edralin learned that her name was on a government wanted list. She left the university and went underground.

Edralin and her husband, fellow activist Rigoberto Tiglao, were arrested in 1973. According to Bantayog ng mga Bayani, the couple were charged with sedition and rebellion and imprisoned at Fort Bonifacio with their daughter Ria. Rigoberto Tiglao described their imprisonment as lasting approximately a year and a half, while the Bantayog account describes the period as almost two years.

Following their release, the couple were placed under house arrest. Edralin attempted to resume her psychology studies at the University of the Philippines but left again because of continuing military surveillance.

She subsequently continued community organizing, counseling, and maintaining contact with other activists. During the early 1980s, she helped establish a community day-care center for the children of political activists and served as its chief officer for two years. She also taught Lamaze childbirth classes.

== Women's rights work ==
Edralin became increasingly involved in the Philippine women's movement during its resurgence in the 1980s. In 1987, she accompanied her husband to the United States after he received a fellowship at Harvard University. She took courses in psychology and women's studies at Harvard and studied services for battered women in the United States.

She undertook training in feminist counseling, completed an internship connected with Boston public-health and hospital services, and observed programs at hospitals in New York. Her studies included the development of hospital protocols for women subjected to battering and rape.

After returning to the Philippines, Edralin helped establish a center originally intended to provide support for women who had survived rape by members of the military. The organization developed into the Women's Crisis Center, which provided counseling, crisis intervention, medical and legal referrals, and other assistance to survivors of violence against women.

Edralin initially worked as a consultant and trainer and subsequently served as the center's executive director for ten years. During her leadership, the Women's Crisis Center developed a hospital-based crisis-intervention program for women subjected to gender-based violence.

Her approach emphasized feminist counseling, which connected a woman's personal experience of abuse with the wider social conditions contributing to violence against women. It sought to respect survivors' decisions and strengthen their ability to exercise control over their own lives.

Tiglao's work included counseling, training service providers, educational outreach, and advocacy concerning domestic violence, rape, and sexual harassment. A tribute by Coalition Against Trafficking in Women co-director Janice Raymond credited her advocacy with contributing to the establishment of women's desks in police stations, campaigns against violence toward women, and reforms involving rape and sexual-harassment laws. Because Raymond's account was a memorial tribute by a colleague, these assessments represent Raymond's account of Tiglao's influence rather than proof that Tiglao was solely responsible for the reforms.

== Regional influence ==
Edralin conducted feminist-counseling training in other Asian countries and helped women's organizations develop services for survivors of violence.

According to the institutional history of the Savy Amira Women's Crisis Centre, Edralin served as the trainer for a feminist-counseling course organized by SPeAK in West Java in July 1997. Three women from Surabaya who attended the training were inspired to begin developing assistance for women subjected to violence.

The participants subsequently organized a series of small meetings known as the Pertemuan Reboan, or Wednesday Meetings. These meetings contributed to the establishment of the Savy Amira Women's Crisis Centre on November 25, 1997.

Savy Amira later developed into a Surabaya-based organization providing psychological and legal assistance to women and children subjected to gender-based violence.

Edralin also helped establish the Asia-Pacific branch of the Coalition Against Trafficking in Women. At the time of her death, she served on the board of the Coalition Against Trafficking in Women–Asia Pacific and on the advisory board of Coalition Against Trafficking in Women International.

== Personal life and health ==
Edralin was married to activist and journalist Rigoberto Tiglao. They had three children: a daughter, Ria, and two sons, Xandro and Dart.

She underwent surgery for a brain tumor in 1981. Although the surgery affected the left side of her face, she continued her activist, counseling, and training work. She later developed cancer and stepped down from the leadership of the Women's Crisis Center as her health deteriorated.

Edralin died in Manila on February 28, 2001, after a long illness. She was 53 years old. Before losing consciousness, she asked that people donate to the Women's Crisis Center instead of bringing flowers to her funeral, according to her husband's memorial account.

== Legacy ==
The Women's Crisis Center named its training and research program the Raquel Edralin-Tiglao Institute for Family Violence Prevention in her honor. The institute developed training on responses to domestic violence, sexual assault, and child sexual abuse.

The Women's Crisis Center remembered Edralin for combining feminist analysis with compassion toward survivors and for teaching that women should be respected as the principal decision-makers in their own lives.

Her influence extended beyond the Philippines through the counselors and organizations she trained. Savy Amira Women's Crisis Centre identifies her 1997 feminist-counseling workshop as an important influence on its formation in Indonesia.

Edralin is recognized by the Bantayog ng mga Bayani, a Philippine memorial honoring people who resisted the Marcos dictatorship. Her biography is included in Bantayog's collection of martyrs and heroes.

== See also ==
- First Quarter Storm
- Kabataang Makabayan
- Lorena Barros
- Human rights abuses of the Marcos dictatorship
- Feminism in the Philippines
- Violence against women in the Philippines
- Bantayog ng mga Bayani
