= Fake news in the Philippines =

Fake news in the Philippines refers to the general and widespread misinformation or disinformation in the country by various actors. The term is a misnomer because "news" is defined as the "accurate and timely reporting of events, ideas and issues." However, the term "fake news" has been popularized by those who seek to undermine trust in media. It has been problematic in the Philippines where social media and alike plays a key role in influencing topics and information ranging from politics, health, belief, religion, current events, aid, lifestyle, elections and others. The 2025 Reuter's Institute Digital News Report found that 67% of Filipinos believed the spread of disinformation as a serious problem. This point of view comes in the wake of widespread disinformation regarding the COVID-19 pandemic in the Philippines and the 2022 and 2025 Philippine general elections.

As early as the 2016 Philippine election, legislators have been questioning social media platforms that allow the spread of disinformation. In the 2022 general elections, opposition leaders, such as Leni Robredo and Senator Kiko Pangilinan were the primary targets of disinformation.

To combat disinformation, several organizations have been established by media and civil society. Most notable is Tsek.ph, the first collaborative network of media, the academe and civil society in that aims to counter disinformation and provide the public with verified information. Several of its partner organizations have been accredited by the International Fact-checking Network.

Other organizations and collaborative efforts have since followed suit.

== History ==
According to media analysts, developing countries such as the Philippines, with generally new access to social media and democracy, feel the problem of fake news to a larger extent. Fake news websites in the country have been identified as early as 2014. Facebook is one of the largest platforms being an open website, that works as a booster to sway the opinion of the public due to manufactured stories. While Facebook provides free media sources, it does not provide its users with the access to fact checking websites. Because of this, government authorities call for a tool that will filter out "fake news" to secure the integrity of cyberspace in the Philippines. The creation of fake news, and fake news accounts on social media has been a danger to the political health of the country. According to Kate Lamble and Megha Mohan of BBC news, "What we're seeing on social media again is manufactured reality ... They also create a very real chilling effect against normal people, against journalists (who) are the first targets, and they attack in very personal ways with death threats and rape threats." Journalists are often risking their lives in publishing articles that contest fake news in the Philippines.

The 2016 Filipino election was influenced, in large part, by false information propagated by fake news outlets. By New York Times contributor Miguel Syjuco's account, President Rodrigo Duterte benefited from a disproportionate amount of complimentary fake news compared to his opponents. The pro-Duterte propaganda spread across Filipino social media include fake endorsements from prominent public figures like Pope Francis and Angela Merkel. Rappler, a social news network in the Philippines, investigated online networks of Rodrigo Duterte supporters and discovered that they include fake news, fake accounts, bots, and trolls, which Rappler thinks are being used to silence dissent. Duterte's own campaign was responsible for a portion of the misinformation spread during the election; according to a study from Oxford Internet Institute's Computational Propaganda Research Project, Duterte's campaign paid an estimated $200,000 for dedicated trolls to undermine dissenters and disseminate misinformation in 2016.

In one incident, Justice Secretary Vitaliano Aguirre II tagged opposition senators and other people as masterminds of the 2017 Marawi Crisis attack, based on a photo shared on social media and blog sites that produce fake news. Another government official, Communications Assistant Secretary Margaux "Mocha" Uson has also been accused of spreading fake news.

Several studies reveal that Bongbong Marcos, son of dictator Ferdinand Marcos, was the main beneficiary of disinformation and fake news, which helped catapult him to the presidency during the 2022 elections. Using social media, Marcos portrayed his father's tenure as a "golden age" for the country and downplayed the atrocities of his father's regime.

The prevalence of fake news in the Philippines has pushed lawmakers to file laws to combat it, like criminalizing its dissemination. The Catholic Bishops Conference of the Philippines strongly opposes the spread of fake news as a sin, and published a list of fake news websites.

In 2025, investigative journalists found sophisticated, organized operations spreading disinformation online with the goal of manipulating public perception of national events, such as the 2025 elections, the arrest of Rodrigo Duterte, the impeachment of Sara Duterte, and the flood control projects scandal.

In February 2025, three committees of the House of Representatives: Public Order and Safety, Information and Communications Technology, and Public Information, began holding legislative inquiries into online disinformation and cybercrimes, where more than 40 Filipino content creators were invited to attend. During the first hearing, PressOne.ph shared that they have uncovered more than 100 accounts with Chinese names that have been supportive of the Dutertes on X that actually originated from Spanish-speaking nations and follow an account linked to China Daily.

In March 2025, following the arrest of Rodrigo Duterte for alleged crimes against humanity related to the Philippine drug war, various types of false information were widely shared. Online propaganda depicting Duterte as a victim proliferated, while the International Criminal Court, the Philippine Supreme Court, and drug war victims were subjected to online attacks. Within 12 hours of the arrest, 200 Facebook pages and accounts posted identical texts that falsely accused police of kidnapping Duterte, even before Duterte lawyers made similar false claims. Former Bayan Muna Representative Neri Colmenares criticized the slew of disinformation and highlighted the need for truth and accountability.

== Structure and hierarchy ==
In 2018, Dr. Jason Cabañes of the University of Leeds School of Media and Communication and Dr. Jonathan Corpus Ong of the University of Massachusetts Amherst released a study of organized disinformation efforts in the Philippines, titled "Architects of Networked Disinformation: Behind the Scenes of Troll Accounts and Fake News Production in the Philippines." Based on participant observation in Facebook community groups and Twitter accounts, as well as key informant interviews with twenty "disinformation architects," conducted from December 2016 to December 2017, the study described a "professionalized and hierarchized group of political operators who design disinformation campaigns, mobilize click armies, and execute innovative "digital black ops" and "signal scrambling" techniques for any interested political client." This network had "ad and PR strategists at the top."

== As a tool of historical denialism ==
Ong and Cabañes' 2018 study revealed that techniques of "personal branding" and such tools as YouTube videos were used to "tell a revisionist account of the 20-year Marcos regime as 'the golden age of the Philippines' in a bid to restore the political luster of the Marcos family."

The study also revealed the existence of an "Ilibing Na" ("Bury now") campaign designed to create public support for a hero's burial for Ferdinand Marcos using "diversionary tactics to elude allegations of human rights violations and corruption during the term of Ferdinand Marcos" and launching "digital black ops that targeted prominent critics" of the Marcoses, particularly Vice President Leni Robredo.

== As a tool to influence elections ==
Fake news has the power to influence Philippine elections. In 2025, the Philippines Commission on Elections (COMELEC) stated that misinformation and disinformation can "make or break" the midterm election.

In May 2025, former Congress representative and Bayan Muna party-list nominee Neri Colmenares filed before the COMELEC a complaint against disinformation that targeted Bayan Muna during the 2025 election campaign period. During the election campaigns, social media posts red-tagged Bayan Muna and falsely claimed that the COMELEC had disqualified Bayan Muna in the party-list race.

Fact-checking group Tsek.ph stated that Vice President Leni Robredo was the "biggest victim" of disinformation during the 2022 Philippine presidential election campaign and that former Senator Bongbong Marcos gained the most from misinformation on social media.

On May 5, 2026, Cong. Terry Ridon, called out Peanut Gallery Media Network (PGMN) over fake news reports. Cong. Janette Garin also filed a resolution asking Congress to convene the tri-committee to investigate fake news and influencers once more. PGMN, its founder, Franco Mabanta, and its hosts, has been accused of partisanship, bias, and operating as a political hitmen, despite pronouncement of being a news media outlet that upholds free speech absolutism. Mabanta later figured in an alleged extortion attempt on Cong. Martin Romualdez, to prevent a critical video from being uploaded on the PGMN site and social media accounts.

== List of fake news websites ==
This list includes URLs for sites that are now down or defunct for historical purposes and to aid disinformation researchers. The following are included after investigation conducted by various Philippine news agencies as well as government policies against fake news.

Name	URL	Status	Notes	Sources
24Seven Daily News	24sevendailynews.com	Cybersquatted.		
360 News Live	www.360news.live	Domain expired		
About Du30	aboutdu30.info	Cybersquatted.		
Adobo Chronicles	adobochronicles.com		Satire	
Ako'y Pilipino	akoy-pilipino.blogspot.com			
Aksyon.tv	aksyon.tv	Now down.	Contains false information and clickbait headline. Imitates AksyonTV, now One Sports.	
Al Jazeera News TV	aljazeeranews-tv.com		Masquerades as Al Jazeera. Legitimate url is https://www.aljazeera.com	
All Things Pinoy	allthingspinoy.com	Now down/defunct.	"www.allthingspinoy.com does not make any warranties about the completeness, reliability and accuracy of this information."	
Angat Pilipino	angatpilipino.info	404 error		
Asian Policy Press	asianpolicy.press	Down again with 404 error.	"...The owner of this blog makes no representations as to the accuracy or completeness of any information on this website...".	
Asenso Pinoy	asensopinoy.info	404 error		
Astig Tayo Pinoy	astigtayopinoy.altervista.org	Account suspended		
Bacolod.altervista.org	bacolod.altervista.org	Account suspended		
Balita Online	balitaonline.xyz	Now website empty		
Balitang Citizen Ph	balitangcitizenph.blogspot.com		Reposted article from dailyartikulo.info.	
Balitang Panglahat	balitangpanglahat.info	Domain parked/cybersquatted		
Balitang Pinoy	balitangpinoy.ga	404 error		
Blog di du30	du30.altervista.org	404 error		
Blog di pinoypolitics	pinoypolitics.altervista.org	Account suspended.	Biggest traffic generators on social media: Pinoy Republic, Pres. Rody Duterte News Global and Pilipinas Trending.	
Breaking News	latestnewz.xyz	404 Error		
Breaking BBC	breaking-bbc.co.uk	Domain suspended.	Masquerades as BBC. Proper URL is https://www.bbc.com.	
Breezy Network	breezynetwork.info	404 error		
Caster Ph	casterph.xyz	404 error		
Citizen Express	citizenexpress.today			
Classified Trends	classifiedtrends.net	Domain expired.		
Cnn Channel	cnn-channel.com	Down.	Masquerades as CNN. Legitimate URLs are cnn.com, edition.cnn.com (for CNN International), and cnnphilippines.com.	
Dailyartikulo	dailyartikulo.info		Traffic largely from The Filipino News, Ferdinand Emmanuel Edralin Marcos and The News Wire social media accounts. Same blog template and theme as DailyInsights.	
Daily Filipinews	dailyfilipinews.blogspot.com	Domain expired.		
Daily Filipino	dailyfilipino.altervista.org	Down.		
DailyInsights	dailyinsights.today	Now Down.	Same blog template and theme as Dailyartikulo.	
The Daily Sentry	thedailysentry.net		Publishes false and misleading news constantly. Has disclaimer: "The Daily Sentry does not make any warranties about the completeness, reliability and accuracy of this information."	
Daily Viral Hub	dailyviralhub.altervista.org		Biggest traffic generators: Facebook pages Marcos Loyalist, Exclusive DDS Marcos the 3rd Force, and BongBong Marcos United.	
Dakila.info	dakila.info	Down.		
DDS Files	ddsfiles.xyz	Down.		
Dedma Lang	dedma.com	Front page now empty. Domain still up.		
Definitely Filipino	definitelyfilipino.com	Down.	No "About Us", no "Contact Us".	
Definitely Filipino	news.definitelyfilipino.net		No "About Us", no "Contact Us".	
Definitely Filipino	balita.definitelyfilipino.com		No "About Us", no "Contact Us".	
Definitely Filipino	buzz.definitelyfilipino.com	Down.	No "About Us", no "Contact Us".	
Definitely Filipino	buzz.definitelyfilipino.net		No "About Us", no "Contact Us".	
The Delicious Yard	thedeliciousyard.com		Impostor site of ABS-CBN.	
Dugong Maharlika	dugongmaharlika.com	Front page blank, has JavaScript		
Du30 Gov	du30gov.com	Down.	Biggest traffic generators on social media: President Rody Duterte – Federal Movement International, Bongbong Marcos Loyalists Movement_Official Group and Marcos Loyalist.	
Du30 News	du30newsinfo.com	Domain expired.		
Du30 Today	du30today.com	Domain expired.		
Dutertards	dutertards.info	Front page blank.	Redirects to 1.dutertards.info.	
Duterte Community	du30community.info	Down.	Biggest social media traffic generators: President Duterte Worldwide Supporters, President Duterte Astig Supporters and Ferdinand Emmanuel Edralin Marcos.	
Duterte Defender	dutertedefender.com	Down.		
Duterte Express	du30express.site	Down		
Duterte Federal	dutertefederal.info	Down.	Biggest traffic generators on social media: Silent No More PH, Duterte Worldwide Supporters and President RodyDuterte – Federal Movement International.	
Duterte News	dutertenews.com	Domain expired.		
Duterte News	du30news.com	Domain expired.		
Duterte News	du30news.net	Down.		
Duterte News	www.dutertenewswatch.com	Down.		
Duterte News	du3onews.info	Down.		
Duterte News Blog	du30newsblog.blogspot.com			
Duterte News Info	du30newsinfo.com	Cybersquatted.	Contains fake articles and satirical news passed off as real news. Publishes fake articles about Rodrigo Duterte's critics.	
Duterte Trending News	dutertetrendingnews.blogspot.com			
Dutertepilipinas.info	dutertepilipinas.info	Down.	Biggest social media traffic generators: Inday Sara Duterte Supporters, President Rodrigo Duterte and Duterte Warriors.	
Duterte Trend	dutertetrend.info	Domain expired.		
Dutrending	dutrending.info	Down.	Largest traffic generators: Facebook pages DU30 Trending News, Duterte Worldwide Supporters and Alan Peter Cayetano Supporters International. redirects to 1.dutrending.info.	
DW-TV3	dw-tv3.com	Now cybersquatted.	Imitates Deutsche Welle.	
Dyaryo	www.dyaryo.net	Down.		
Media ni Duterte	dutertedefender.com	Cybersquatted.		
Media ni Duterte	lugto.com	Domain expired.		
Earning Mania	earningmania.com	Domain is now suspended.	Mimics the design of the official ABS-CBN News website (news.abs-cbn.com), complete with the logo of ABS-CBN. It also contains false information to get Bitcoin cash. No about or contact information.	
Eritas Times	eritastimes.com			
Federalism PH	jazznews.top	Down.	Biggest traffic generator from social media: Facebook page Philippine Trending News.	
Extreme Readers	extremereaders.com	Domain Expired.		
FilipiNews PH	filipinewsph.net	Now down and replaced as Japanese website.	"FilipiNews PH does not make any warranties about the completeness, reliability and accuracy of this information.".	
FilipiNews	filipinews.info	Down.		
FilipiNews	filipinews.com	Expired.		
France 24 TV	France24-tv.com	Domain expired.	Imitates France 24 (france24.com)	
Global News	globalnews.favradio.fm		Reverted to favradio.fm hosting	
GMA TV	gma-tv.com	Domain expired.	Imitates GMA 7. Some false stories released by this fake news website included the alleged photos of a gunman captured by CCTV camera during the 2017 Resorts World Manila attack, supposed plan to establish a Nickelodeon theme park in Coron by the Department of Tourism, and the purported criticism of the National Super Alliance (NASA) by the Independent Electoral and Boundaries Commission and Jubilee for threatening to boycott the August elections.	
Go for Win	goforwin.info			
Good News Network Philippines	goodnewsnetworkph.com	Domain expired.	Exploits the name of GNN. Mocha Uson made a callout to follow its Facebook page as "a true alternative for the good news released by the Duterte Admin" in February 2018. Biggest traffic generators: pro-Duterte Facebook page managed by Mocha Uson, Mocha Uson Blog, President Rody Duterte Facebook Army and Team Duterte for Federalism.	
Good News Today	goodnewstoday.d30.club	Down	Biggest traffic generators from social media: Marcos Defenders Worldwide Unlimited and Rody R. Duterte Movement Universal.	
Gossip Diary	gossipdiary.com	Domain expired.	Biggest traffic generators on social media: President Rody Duterte – Federal Movement International, Marcos Loyalist and Alan Peter Cayetano Supporters International.	
Healthnation Asia	healthnation-asia.com	Down.	Imitates ABS-CBN News Channel	
Hot News Philippines	hotnewsphil.blogspot.com			
I Am Pilipino	www.iampilipino.com	Error 403.		
International Latest Updates	internationallatestupdates.blogspot.com		Redirect from trendingnewsphfile.net.	
Kabalita Ka	kabalitaka.blogspot.com	Now Down.	Biggest traffic generators on social media: Marcos Loyalist and President Rody Duterte Facebook Army.	
Kalye Pinoy	kalyepinoy.com	Now Down.		
Kanto News PH	kantonewsph.xyz	Empty.	Biggest traffic generators on social media: Facebook pages President Rody Duterte – Federal Movement International, President Duterte Worldwide Supporters and President Duterte Astig Supporters.	
Kanto News PH	kantonewsph.info		Biggest traffic generators on social media: Facebook pages President Rody Duterte – Federal Movement International, President Duterte Worldwide Supporters and President Duterte Astig Supporters.	
Latest Duterte News	latestdutertenews.altervista.org	Account suspended		
Leak News PH	www.leaknewsph.com	Down.		
Local Hero	localhero.altervista.org	Account suspended		
Maharlika News Netizens PH	www.maharlikanews.com			
Makibalita	makibalita.info	Down.		
Media Curious	mediacurious.com	Down.		
Media Ph	mediaph.info	Now Down.	Biggest traffic generator: Facebook page Sara Duterte Solid Warriors.	
Minda Nation	mindanation.com	404	Owned by Carlos Munda.	
Mosquito Press	mosquitopress.net			
My News TV	mynewstv.newsgenic.com	Down	Exploits the name of GMA News TV (now GTV).	
My Prosper	my-prosper.press	Down.		
Nagbabagang Balita	nagbabagangbalita.info	Redirects to malware website.		
Napankamkumametbeewan.info	napankamkumametbeewan.info	Down.		
Net Citizen	netcitizen.co	Redirects to malware website.		
News 8 Bureau	globalnews.favradio.fm	Down.		
News Center Ph	newscenterph.info	Redirects to malware website.	Traffic largely generated by Facebook pages President Rody Duterte – Federal Movement International, Marcos Loyalist, BongBong Marcos United, The Filipino News, Pinas Citizen and News Wire PH.	
newsevery7hours.blogspot.com	newsevery7hours.blogspot.com			
News Feed Society	www.newsfeedsociety.tk	Down.		
News Global	newsglobal.top	Down.		
News Info Learn	newsinfolearn.com	Now down.	"...www.newsinfolearn.com does not make any warranties about the completeness, reliability and accuracy of this information...".	
News Media PH	newsmediaph.com	Down.	No "About Us".	
Newspaper Ph	newspaperph.com	Domain parked/cybersquatted		
News Titans	newstitans.com	Domain expired.		
News TV	newstv.tulfonews.com	Down.	Exploits the name of GMA News TV (now GTV).	
News TV5	newstv5.com	Domain expired.	Masquerades as the legitimate https://news.tv5.com.ph	
Newz Flash	newzflash.info			
Newsbite.top	newsbite.top	Down.	Biggest traffic generators on social media: President Rody Duterte – Federal Movement International, Marcos Loyalist and We Support Duterte Administration.	
Online Balita	onelinebalita.xyz	Down.		
The Philippine Chronicle	thephilippinechronicle.com			
Philippine News Blog	ilikeyouquotes.blogspot.com	Down.		
Philippine News Courier	philnewscourier.blogspot.com		Associated with Facebook page "Philippine News Courier."	
Philippine News Portal	www.philnewsportal.com	Down.		
The Philippine Trend	thephilippinetrend.com			
Philnewstrend	dakilanglahi.info	Down.		
Philstar.i-telecast.com	Philstar.i-telecast.com	Now down.	Imitates the website of The Philippine Star.	
Phnewspride	Phnewspride.blogspot.com	Redirects to Arabic Website with the same domain.		
Pilipinas News	fullnewsph.xyz	Now Down.	Translated term was Balita sa Pilipinas. It is not to be confused with the namesake defunct news program of TV5 and Balita Pilipinas, a defunct news program of GMA News TV (now GTV).	
Pilipinas Online Updates	www.pilipinasonlineupdates.com	Now Down.	Takes some of its articles from Balitang Pinas. "Pilipinas Online Updates makes no representations, warranties, or assurances as to the accuracy, currency or completeness of the content contain (sic) onthis website or any sites linked to this site"	
Pinoy Hopes	pinoyhopes.info	Down.		
Pinoy News	pinoynews.info	Down.		
Pinas News Portal	pinasnewsportal.blogspot.com	Down.		
Pinoy Freedom Wall	pinoyfreedomwall.com	Down.		
Pinoy News Blogger	pinoynewsblogger.blogspot.com	Down.		
Pinoy Speak	pinoyspeak.info	Now Error 502.	Posts satirical articles and passes them off as real news.	
Pinoy Viral Issues	pinoyviralissues.net	Down.		
Pinoy World	pinoyworld.net	Down.		
PRRD News	phppoliticsnews.blogspot.com	Redirects to Indonesian language website with the same domain.		
Pinoy Observer	pinoyobserver.com	Redirects to scam Chinese website.	Front page is blank, but full of JavaScript.	
Pinoy Thinking	pinoythinking.info	Down.		
Pinoy Trending	pinoytrending.altervista.org		No "About Us", contact info.	
Pinoy Trending News	pinoytrendingnews.net		"...Information on this site may contain errors and inaccuracies..."	
Pinoy Trending News	pinoytrendingnewsph.blogspot.com		"...Information on this site may contain errors and inaccuracies..."	
Pinoy Trending News	pinoytrending.altervista.org		"...Information on this site may contain errors and inaccuracies..."	
Pinoy Viral Issues	pinoyviralissues.net		Down.	
The Professional Heckler	professionalheckler.wordpress.com			
PRRD News Tambayan	dds-tambayan.info	Down.	Biggest traffic generator: Alan Peter Cayetano Supporters International social media page.	
Public Trending	publictrending.net	Down.	"...The owner of this blog makes no representations as to the accuracy or completeness of any information on this site or found by following any link on this site."	
Public Trending	publictrending.news		"...The owner of this blog makes no representations as to the accuracy or completeness of any information on this site or found by following any link on this site."	
Public Trending	pinoytrending.altervista.org		"...The owner of this blog makes no representations as to the accuracy or completeness of any information on this site or found by following any link on this site."	
QWAZK	qwazk.blogspot.com	Redirects to Indonesian website with the same domain.		
So Whats News	sowhatsnews.wordpress.com		Satirical news site. Private Site.	
Socialcastph.info	socialcastph.info	Down.	Biggest traffic generator pages from social media: President Rodrigo Duterte, Marcos Loyalist and Alan Peter Cayetano Supporters International.	
Social News PH	www.socialnewsph.com	Now domain expired.	Connected to the Facebook pages SNP – Social News Philippines and President Duterte Random Photos. "...does not give assurances as to the accuracy, completeness and currency of its content..."	
Taho News	tahonews.com			
Tartey Viral	tartey.com	Now down.	Contains articles obtained from News Trend PH, which also publishes fake news. No About US, no Contact Us. "makes no representations, warranties, or assurances as to the accuracy or completeness of the content".	
Telegraph TV	telegraph-tv.com	Domain expired.	Imitates British newspaper The Telegraph (telegraph.co.uk).	
Tatak Du30	tatakdu30.info	Down.		
testhuby.blogspot.com	testhuby.blogspot.com			
The News Feeder	thenewsfeeder.net	Down.		
The Tlmes	thetlmes.com		Imitation of British newspaper The Times.	
The Volatilian	thevolatilian.com	Now redirected to scam Chinese website.		
Thinker Vlog	thinkervlog.top	Down		
Today in Manila	todayinmanila.ga	Now down.	No "About Us", no "Contact Us".	
Today's Broadcast	todaysbroadcast.net	Down.		
Todays Top News	todaystopnews.xyz	Down.		
Trending Balita	trendingbalita.info	Now Down/Under Construction.		
Trending News Portal	tnp.ph	Malware.	"Trending News Portal makes no representations, warranties, or assurances as to the accuracy, currency or completenesss of the content contain on this website or and sites linked to this site". Changed URLs multiple times. Frequently shared by Mocha Uson on her Facebook page Mocha Uson Blog. Run by Twinmark Media Enterprises, whose entire network of pages was banned by Facebook in January 2019 for spammy practices and "coordinated inauthentic behavior". 220 Facebook pages, 73 Facebook accounts and 29 Instagram accounts were removed.	
Trending News Portal	trendingnewsportal.com	Malware.		
Trending News Portal	trendingnewsportal.net	Malware.		
Trending News Portal	trendingnewsportal.net.ph	404.		
Trending News Portal	trendingnewsportal.blogspot.com	Down.		
Trending News Portal	trendingnewsportal-ph.blogspot.com	Down.		
Trending News Portal	tnp.today	Blank.		
Tomorrow Economy	www.tomorrow-economy.com	Down.	Blatantly imitates the Manila Times website. Same article as Earning Mania.	
Trending Balita	trendingbalita.info	Now Down/Under Construction.		
Trending News Video	trendingnewsvideo.com	Down.		
Trending Topics	trendingtopics.altervista.org	Suspended.		
Trending Viral	trendingviral.tk	Now down.	"The owner of this blog makes no representations as to the accuracy or completeness of any information on this site.... will not be liable for any errors or omissions in this information nor the availability of this information...".	
TV CNN	tv-cnn.com	Domain expired.	Masquerades as CNN. Legitimate URLs are cnn.com, edition.cnn.com (for CNN International), and cnnphilippines.com.	
Unang Hirit	unanghirit.info	Down.	Imitates the GMA Network morning news program of the same name.	
Update.ph	update.ph			
Updated Tayo	updatetayo.info	Down.		
Verified Philippines	verifiedph.blogspot.com			
Viral Duterte News	balitangtotoo.xyz	Empty.	Traffic generated by Facebook groups President Rodrigo Duterte Facebook Army, Inday Sara Duterte Supporters and President Rody Duterte – Federal Movement International.	
Viral Portal	viralportal.ml	Down.		
World Trends	worldstrends.info	Down.		
XOLXOL	xolxol.ph			

== Reactions ==
Fake news sites have become rampant for Philippine audiences, especially being shared on social media. Politicians have started filing laws to combat fake news and three Senate hearings have been held on the topic.

The Catholic Church in the Philippines has also released a missive speaking out against it.

Vera Files research at the end of 2017 and 2018 show that the most shared fake news in the Philippines appeared to benefit 2 people the most: President Rodrigo Duterte (as well as his allies) and politician and later president Bongbong Marcos, with the most viral news driven by shares on networks of Facebook pages. Most Philippine audience Facebook pages and groups spreading online disinformation also bear "Duterte", "Marcos" or "News" in their names and are pro-Duterte. Online disinformation in the Philippines is overwhelmingly political as well, with most attacking groups or individuals critical of the Duterte administration. Many Philippine-audience fake news websites also appear to be controlled by the same operators as they share common Google AdSense and Google Analytics IDs.

According to media scholar Jonathan Corpus Ong, Duterte's presidential campaign is regarded as the patient zero in the current era of disinformation, having preceded widespread global coverage of the Cambridge Analytica scandal and Russian trolls. Fake news is so established and severe in the Philippines that Facebook's Global Politics and Government Outreach Director Katie Harbath also calls it "patient zero" in the global misinformation epidemic, having happened before Brexit, the Trump nomination and the 2016 US Elections.

== Government response ==
The Philippine government has taken measures to address the rise of online disinformation and digital scams. In 2025, the DICT introduced the "Good Vibes sa Internet" policy. This comprehensive initiative is designed to counter online disinformation, scams, and various digital security threats by significantly enhancing inter-agency coordination across government bodies.

The DICT reinforced its 1326 hotline service in June of the same year. The hotline was integrated with e-Government and eReport, the government's centralized digital systems, as part of this enhancement. The goal of this integration was to make it easier for citizens to report instances of phishing, online fraud, and fake news.

== See also ==
- Mocha Uson
- RJ Nieto
- Peanut Gallery Media Network
- List of fake news websites
- Fake news in India
- Fake news in the United States
- Indian WhatsApp lynchings
