= RJ Nieto =

Filipino political blogger and columnist (born 1985)

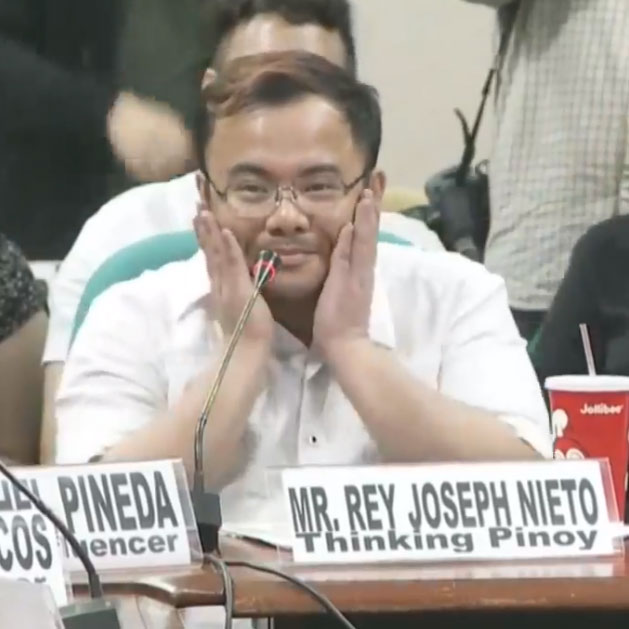
- RJ Nieto in 2017
- Born: Rey Joseph Pengson Nieto; January 26, 1985 (age 41)
- Occupations: Blogger; vlogger; radio host; columnist
- Writing career
- Pen name: Thinking Pinoy
- Language: English; Filipino
- Genre: Commentary
- Subjects: Politics; current events; public affairs

YouTube information
- Channel: Thinking Pinoy
- Years active: 2016–present
- Genre: Political commentary
- Subscribers: 274 thousand
- Views: 33.2 million
- Last updated: April 30, 2022
- Website: www.thinkingpinoy.net

Rey Joseph "RJ" Pengson Nieto, (born January 26, 1985) known also by his alias Thinking Pinoy, is a Filipino blogger and opinion columnist. He writes an op-ed column for the Manila Bulletin and also owns a blog site, where he publishes his opinions on Filipino politics. A well-known and vocal supporter of President Rodrigo Duterte, he has drawn controversies and faced legal proceedings for allegations of libel and spreading disinformation, as well as his counter-criticisms against he and the administration's critics.

== Early life and education ==
Rey Joseph finished high school in 2002 at St. Mary's College of Baliuag. He attended the University of the Philippines Diliman majoring in Mathematics but later dropped from school in 2005. He studied for a short time at the University of the Cordilleras, before moving to the University of London, studying for a BSc in Mathematics and Economics.

== Work ==
RJ Nieto hosting a limited series show on People's Television

He worked as a columnist reporter at the Sunstar Davao local newspaper in 2010. RJ Nieto served as a co-host for the political podcast and radio program Karambola sa DWIZ 882, together with Jonathan dela Cruz, Trixie Cruz-Angeles, Conrad Banal and Larry Gadon from 2016 to 2020. The podcast simultaneously broadcasts on Facebook Live, YouTube Live and to analog radio receivers.

Nieto was hired in July 2017 by the Department of Foreign Affairs as its social media consultant and was tasked to be its "head of strategic communications for migrant workers' affairs". He reportedly resigned in November 2017, a week after attending a Senate hearing which discussed fake news.

The Bases Conversion and Development Authority offered Nieto a consultancy post to help it promote its projects especially the major endeavours under the Duterte administration's Build! Build! Build! infrastructure program but the blogger declined the offer.

RJ Nieto has his own weekly op-ed column on Manila Bulletin titled Thinking Pinoy, with the first article published on October 18, 2019. Nieto still writes on his column as of August 2021.

Currently, Nieto has his own show on SMNI News, called Thinking Pinoy on SMNI (or TP on SMNI), a weekday radio and TV program commentary on topics of national interest and political issues together with co-host Admar Villando. First guest on the first episode was former senator, Bongbong Marcos. The show faced mixed comments and eventually became a hit on the network.

Before TP on SMNI, Nieto first appeared as a co-host on the show Usaping Bayan with Mike Abe on the same channel in September 2020.

== ThinkingPinoy.net ==
ThinkingPinoy.net
- Country of origin: Philippines
- Owner: RJ Nieto
- Industry: Blogging, Commentary
- Website: thinkingpinoy.net
- Registration: Not required to access the website
- Users: 1.6 million+ followers as of August 2021
- Launched: November 2015
- Current status: active
- Written in: HTML, JavaScript, PHP
- The Facebook page facebook.com/TheThinkingPinoy managed by Nieto serves as a mirror/extension of the main blog site.

According to an interview on the now-defunct Concept News Central, ThinkingPinoy.net started in November 2015. The About page also claimed that RJ Nieto “started this hobby in mid-November, when he created the infographic in RapplerX. The infographic was shared over 20,000 times across several social media platforms.” His Facebook page, ThinkingPinoy.net, which functions as an extension/mirror of the website, has 1.6 million+ followers as of August 2021.

=== Notable blog posts ===
- On July 28, 2021, a 2019 post of RJ Nieto about weightlifting athlete Hidilyn Diaz resurfaced a few days after the latter won the first gold medal for the Philippines in 2020 Tokyo Olympics. The post, telling Diaz that she could be court-martialed, trended in 2019 with 14,000+ Facebook likes and 4,000+ shares. Netizens who unearthed the blog post pointed out the irony that Diaz, also a military officer, was rather promoted instead of court-martialed, and that Nieto's post did not age well. Before Diaz won the championship, she was maliciously included in the “Oust-Duterte Plot Matrix” in 2019 by then-Presidential Spokesperson Salvador Panelo. Diaz denied the allegations of Panelo and Nieto in a social media post.

== Fake news and misinformation ==
Nieto has posted fake news and misinformation multiple times on his blog and Facebook page.

- Donald Trump and Antonio Trillianes - in 2017, Nieto made a post where he alleged that US President Donald Trump called Senator Antonio Trillanes a "little narco" or a drug lord. The senator called the claims in the article "fake news" and has filed a libel case against Nieto for the post while the blogger claimed that the primary source for the post was Al Pedroche's column in Pilipino Star Ngayon. Pedroche has apologized for the column saying that the interaction between Trump and Trillanes did not take place.
- In June 2017, Nieto falsely accused photojournalist Jes Aznar of endangering government troops during the Battle of Marawi by revealing positions to the public via videos posted online. Contrary to Nieto's claims, Aznar posted the videos when the government troops he was embedded with were already out of the area, and that Aznar's video postings were fully sanctioned by the military. Nieto was condemned in posting his false accusations by the National Union of Journalists of the Philippines (NUJP) for endangering Aznar's life via threats and harassment from Nieto's followers.
- In November 2017, Nieto created a post misquoting Canadian Prime Minister Justin Trudeau as saying "...Theoretically, it is impossible to get (the garbage) back... even if it originally came from Canada" in reference to trash shipped to the Philippines from Canada. In fact, Trudeau's actual quote was "Even though it originally came from Canada, we had legal barriers and restrictions that prevented us from being able to take it back. Those regulations and those impediments have now been addressed, so it is now theoretically possible to get it back.", which is the complete opposite of what Nieto posted.
- On March 4, 2018, he cited a falsified 1979 psychiatric report attributed to the late Fr. Jaime Bulatao, SJ on former President Benigno Aquino III. On March 7, The Ateneo de Manila University Department of Psychology condemned the posting and reiterated that the report was a fabrication. On April 27, 2010, Bulatao had already categorically denied having written and signed the report.
- On December 28, in his Manila Bulletin column and blog, Nieto falsely claimed that Philippine mainstream media and journalists were spreading fake news for stating that an amendment to the United States Fiscal Year 2020 State and Foreign Operations Appropriations Bill included a prohibition on entry to the United States for foreign government officials that the U.S. Secretary of State had credible information to have been involved in the wrongful imprisonment of Senator Leila De Lima. However, in a radio interview on December 29, Philippine Presidential Spokesperson Salvador Panelo said that Philippine Ambassador to the U.S. Jose Manuel "Babes" Romualdez confirmed that the entry ban was true. While the approved U.S. Appropriations Act of 2020, signed on Dec 20 by U.S. President Donald Trump does not itself expressly mention the ban, the act's accompanying explanatory statement in the Division G section states that U.S. Federal Government entities are directed to comply with the directives and instructions of the reports accompanying the State Department appropriation bills of both the House and Senate. This includes the U.S. Senate Committee Report 116-126 that states: "Prohibition on Entry.--The Secretary of State shall apply subsection (c) to foreign government officials about whom the Secretary has credible information have been involved in the wrongful imprisonment of:... ...(2) Senator Leila de Lima who was arrested in the Philippines in 2017." On January 22, 2020, Senator Ronaldo "Bato" dela Rosa confirmed that his travel visa to the United States had indeed been canceled.
- On January 18, 2020, Nieto falsely claimed that Ayala Land was only paying ₱22 per square meter monthly to University of the Philippines for the lease of land of U.P.–Ayala Land TechnoHub, citing his expertise as a former Mathematics major at said university (which he did not graduate from) to get to this figure. Office of the President of the Philippines spokesperson Salvador Panelo declared that he wanted to review the lease contract between Ayala Land and University of the Philippines after reading about it on Nieto's blog. In actuality, Ayala Land is bound to pay more than ₱10 billion for the lease of land owned by University of the Philippines and is currently paying ₱171 per square meter and not ₱22 as claimed by Nieto and cited by Panelo.
- On March 2, 2020, Nieto claimed that Senator Franklin Drilon dozed off for five to ten seconds during a February 27, 2020, interview with CNN Philippines anchor Pinky Webb. Contrary to Nieto's claim, Drilon was reading documents in front of him and was not sleeping. Webb later posted on her Twitter account, "Here’s what happened. As I was laying the premise for my question, I saw Sen Drilon look down at the documents he had on the table. I did not see him fall asleep."
- On April 19, 2024, in "Tune-in Kay Tunying", Liza Araneta Marcos criticized her former associates, pro-Rodrigo Duterte vloggers Nieto and trans woman Sass Rogando Sasot now speaking badly on her family. The First Lady alleged that she legally assisted them pro bono on their Cybercrime Prevention Act of 2012 case.

== Inciting violence against journalists ==
On November 3, 2017, Nieto on his radio program Karambola on DWIZ urged then Presidential Spokesperson Harry Roque to throw a concrete hollow block at journalist Pia Ranada. The NUJP denounced Nieto for threatening Ranada on air and added that Nieto may have committed a crime. The Kapisanan ng mga Brodkaster ng Pilipinas (KBP - Association of Broadcasters of the Philippines) reprimanded Nieto for making a personal attack against Ranada and found him guity of violating the Broadcast Code, in which Article 4, Section 1 states: "Personal attacks, that is, attacks on the honesty, integrity or personal qualities of an identified person, institution or group on matters that have no bearing on public interest are prohibited." The KBP also called out Aliw Broadcasting Corporation which runs DWIZ for allowing Nieto to go on air even if he lacked KBP accreditation.

== Legal cases ==
=== Cyberlibel ===
Nieto has been allegedly involved in doxxing, and a cyberlibel case has been filed against him by blogger Jover Laurio, the author of Pinoy Ako Blog.

=== Criminal libel ===
In 2018, Nieto was also indicted for libel for posting on his blog that U.S. President Donald Trump called former opposition senator Antonio Trillanes a narco or drug lord. Nieto filed a not guilty plea and refused to comment on the case, telling reporters, "Let's just wait for the trial." His indictment for the criminal libel case filed against him by Trillanes has been criticized as a backward step by freedom of expression advocates who lobby for the decriminalization of libel. By June 2021, Pasay RTC Judge Wilhelmina Jorge-Wagan eventually acquitted Nieto, four years after the case was filed.

=== Data privacy case ===
Pinoy Ako Blog user Jover Laurio wins her data privacy violation case against blogger RJ Nieto or Thinking Pinoy following March 31, 2023 decision of the Makati City Regional Trial Court Branch 132, found Nieto guilty of violating Republic Act No. 10173, or the Data Privacy Act of 2012.

== Personal life ==
RJ Nieto is openly gay and has talked about it on his blog posts. He has also produced videos together with transgender vlogger Sass Rogando Sasot tackling gender issues along with showbiz and politics on their podcast KanTalk. The duo have notably expressed support for the passing of the pro-LGBT and anti-discrimination SOGIE Equality Bill into law.

== See also ==
- Mocha Uson
- Mocha Uson Blog
- Sass Rogando Sasot
- Fake news in the Philippines
