= The Mind Museum =

Science museum in Taguig, Philippines

- The museum in 2022
- Established: March 16, 2012; 14 years ago
- Location: Bonifacio Global City, Taguig, Metro Manila, Philippines
- Coordinates: 14°33′08″N 121°02′44″E
- Type: Science Centre
- Accreditation: Asia Pacific Network of Science & Technology Centres (ASPAC), Association of Science-Technology Centers (ASTC)
- Collection size: 250+ exhibits
- Curator: Maria Isabel Garcia
- Public transit access: L03 C04 NR04 NR14 Net One
- Website: The Mind Museum
- Building details

Design and construction
- Architect: Ed Calma
- Architecture firm: Lor Calma & Partners

The Mind Museum is a science museum in Taguig, Metro Manila, Philippines. It is located on a 1.2-hectare (3.0-acre) lot in the J. Y. Campos Park in Bonifacio Global City, a business district of the city.

The museum opened on March 16, 2012, although a pre-launch reception was held a year earlier on December 15 where Vice President Jejomar Binay delivered a speech on behalf of President Benigno Aquino III. The facility was developed by the Bonifacio Art Foundation Inc (BAFI).

== Museum building ==
The museum was designed by architect Ed Calma from Lor Calma & Partners. The design of the structure was inspired from cellular structure and growth and had a solar reflective exterior, natural wind ventilation and rainwater flow drainage.

== Exhibits ==
As of 2012, the museum has five main galleries occupying a 4,900-square-meter (53,000 sq ft) exhibit area and spanning two floors. The galleries each had its own theme namely, atom, life, earth, universe and technology which are linked by features called "Nature’s Webways". The atom, life, earth, and universe galleries are located on the ground floor, while the technology gallery are found on the first floor of the two-story museum.

With assistance from a firm based in the United States, which did the master plan of the museum, Filipino designers, scientists and fabricators created 90 percent of the museum's exhibits. This included designers and faculty from the College of Fine Arts of the University of the Philippines and the University of Santo Tomas.

== Reception ==
At the 2014 THEA Awards held on April 5, at the Disneyland Resort, Anaheim, California in the United States, the museum was awarded the THEA Award for Outstanding Achievement for the Science Museum category for the design and execution of its exhibits. The distinction is the first for a Philippine establishment and for a science museum in Asia at the THEA Awards.
