= Mocha Uson =

Filipino media personality (born 1978)

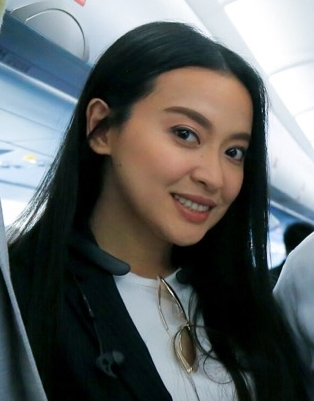
- Uson in 2017

Deputy Administrator for Membership Promotion, OFW Family Welfare, and Media Relations of the Overseas Workers Welfare Administration
- In office September 23, 2019 – 2022
- Administrator: Hans Leo J. Cacdac

Assistant Secretary for Social Media of the Presidential Communications Group
- In office May 8, 2017 – October 1, 2018
- Secretary: Martin Andanar

Member of the Board of the Movie and Television Review and Classification Board
- In office January 5, 2017 – May 8, 2017

Personal details
- Born: Esther Margaux Justiniano Uson; May 17, 1978 (age 48) (Note: In 2024, Uson's official Certificate of Candidacy (COC) was publicized by the Commission on Elections prior to the 2025 elections. The COC stated that Uson was born on May 17, 1978 in Makati. However, this contradicts the previous instances when Uson's date and place of birth were disclosed. The first is the Star Confessions episode which aired on TV5 in May 2011, while the second was the Philstar article which was published to complement the Star Confessions episode. The former stated that Uson was born on May 17, 1985 in Urdaneta, while the latter noted that she was born in Dagupan, instead of Urdaneta; both Dagupan and Urdaneta are located in Pangasinan. In contrast, an article in the Varsitarian – the official newspaper of the University of Santo Tomas (UST) – seemed to have been in line with the information written in Uson's 2024 COC, thus validating her birth year. The article stated that she finished her Medical Technology studies at the University of Santo Tomas in 1998, which puts Uson's age at 20 years when she graduated from UST; in the era before the K–12 system was implemented, an average Filipino student would likely graduate from tertiary or collegiate education at the age of 19 or 20.) Urdaneta or Dagupan, Pangasinan, or Makati, Philippines
- Party: Aksyon Demokratiko (2024–present)
- Other political affiliations: PDP (until 2024)
- Education: University of Santo Tomas (BS)
- Occupation: Blogger, singer-dancer, actress, model, politician
- Musical career
- Genres: Pop; P-pop
- Years active: 2001–present
- Formerly of: Mocha Girls

Esther Margaux Justiniano Uson (born May 17, 1978), better known as Mocha Uson, is a Filipino media personality, political blogger, and former public official whose career and online presence have drawn significant attention and criticism, particularly regarding allegations of spreading fake news and disinformation. She is also a co-founder of the dance group Mocha Girls.

Uson served as a member of the Movie and Television Review and Classification Board (MTRCB) from January 2017 until her appointment as an assistant secretary of the Presidential Communications Operations Office (PCOO) in May of the same year by President Rodrigo Duterte. Duterte defended the appointment, citing utang na loob (debt of gratitude) for her support during his presidential election campaign. She resigned from the PCOO on October 3, 2018, following a series of controversies; sources gave differing accounts, with some reporting she was dismissed by Malacañang. On September 30, 2019, Duterte appointed Uson as deputy executive director of the Overseas Workers Welfare Administration (OWWA), an appointment which drew public criticism from Filipino netizens.

Prior to her government appointments, Uson was known for her work as an entertainer with the Mocha Girls, which included performances and media content that were described as risqué. Her time in office, particularly her use of her blog as a platform, was marked by criticism regarding her administrative competence and the dissemination of fake news and misinformation. News outlets and critics have referred to her as the "Queen of Fake News."

== Early life and education ==
Mocha Uson was born in Dagupan, Pangasinan, Philippines. However, she later stated in her Certificate of Candidacy to run for councilor of Manila in 2025 that she was born in Makati, Metro Manila on May 17, 1978. Her father, Oscar Uson, was a judge of the Regional Trial Court in Pangasinan who was assassinated in September 2002 in Asingan. Her mother, Estrellita Uson, was a pediatrician in Dagupan and a breast cancer survivor. Due to her baby's dark complexion, Uson's mother was frequently gifted with mocha-flavored cakes and ice-cream as a filial or friendly joke, which inspired her childhood nickname.

Uson graduated with a Bachelor of Science degree in Medical Technology from the University of Santo Tomas in 1998. She later enrolled at the university's Faculty of Medicine and Surgery in 1999, but left during her second year to pursue professional modeling and a song-and-dance career.

== Musical and acting career ==
=== Music and dance ===
Uson started as a solo singer-dancer, performing in bars within Metro Manila. She became popular for her sexy image combined with on-stage antics, including lap dances. She also became the lead vocalist of a rock band, Mocha with Spin Art.

In 2006, Uson and her manager, Lord Byron Cristobal, held an audition that led to the formation of the Mocha Girls, together with Hershey Delas Alas, Bez Lacanlale, Grace Oracion, and Heart de Guzman. The group's debut album, A Taste of Mocha, was released in 2006 by XAX Records. Their second album, Mocha, was released in 2007 by Viva Records. Their third album, Deliciosa, was released in 2008, also on Viva Records. The Mocha Girls performed in various venues throughout the Philippines, United States, Dubai, and Guam.

In 2010, Hershey Delas Alas, Bez Lacanlale, Grace Oracion, and Heart de Guzman were dismissed by Cristobal for allegedly accepting drinks and mingling with male customers after a gig; they later formed a splinter girl group called Girlz Ink. Thereafter, the Mocha Girls released a fourth album, Pinay Ako, in 2012 and toured various Philippine cities and internationally in the United States, the United Kingdom, Canada, United Arab Emirates, Bahrain, Malaysia, Cambodia, Thailand, Hong Kong, and Singapore.

=== Film ===
In 2009, Uson made her film debut in Sumpa where she starred alongside Joross Gamboa. In 2011, she starred in the Filipino-Malaysian film Seksing Masahista. She also starred in the movies So Much Pain So in Love (2011) and Butas 2 (2012). In 2013, she starred in a coming-of-age film, Mga Alaala ng Tag-ulan, alongside Akihiro Blanco.

== Online presence ==
=== Blog ===
Uson is one of the most widely-read commentators in the Philippines through her blog, Mocha Uson Blog, which is hosted on Facebook. Initially, she provided commentary and advice on sex and sexuality and hosted online video chats.

During the 2016 Philippine presidential elections, Uson's blog posts began to shift towards politics. Her blog reached over 5.3 million followers in December 2017, with posts that actively support Duterte and his anti-drug campaign. Her blog also opposes much of the country's leading newsgroups, including ABS-CBN, GMA Network, the Philippine Daily Inquirer, and Rappler, which she derided collectively as "Presstitutes" (a portmanteau of press and prostitute). She had also openly criticized Vice President Leni Robredo, Senators Leila de Lima and Antonio Trillanes, and the Liberal Party.

=== Twitter ===
Uson also has an active Twitter account. In the morning of March 9, 2017, her account was suspended. She went live that day to criticize supporters of the Liberal Party, who she claimed were responsible for jeopardizing her account. Her account was restored later that afternoon.

=== Facebook ===
Uson likewise maintains an active Facebook account. At around 8:00 pm on March 20, 2020, Facebook took down Uson's account following calls to mass report her for violation of Facebook's standards, specifically on propagating hate speech. Following this development, the hashtag #MochaUsonIsOverParty once again emerged as a top trending Philippine and worldwide topic.

=== Internet memes ===
Uson is also known for being featured in a number of Filipino Internet memes, including one scene from the 2013 movie Four Sisters and a Wedding, which depicts her being dragged out of a restaurant by the hair in a catfight with the character played by Angel Locsin.

== Politics and activism ==
=== 2016 presidential elections ===
Uson voiced strong support for then-Davao City Mayor Rodrigo Duterte during his successful 2016 presidential campaign.

During the campaign, she was involved in a dispute with musician Jim Paredes, a member of the OPM musical group APO Hiking Society. Paredes, a supporter of the Liberal Party, along with Senator Mar Roxas, accused Duterte of human rights violations. Uson cited an interview that she had done with Paredes in 2012, alleging that Paredes had questioned her sexual orientation and that he had tried to "hit" on her Mocha Girls bandmate, Mae Dela Cerna and herself. Paredes later responded on his official website, saying that he doesn't remember asking such questions to Uson, describing her allegations as "mere exaggeration", and explaining that she was "very candid, almost bragging" during the interview.

=== As part of Rodrigo Duterte's administration ===
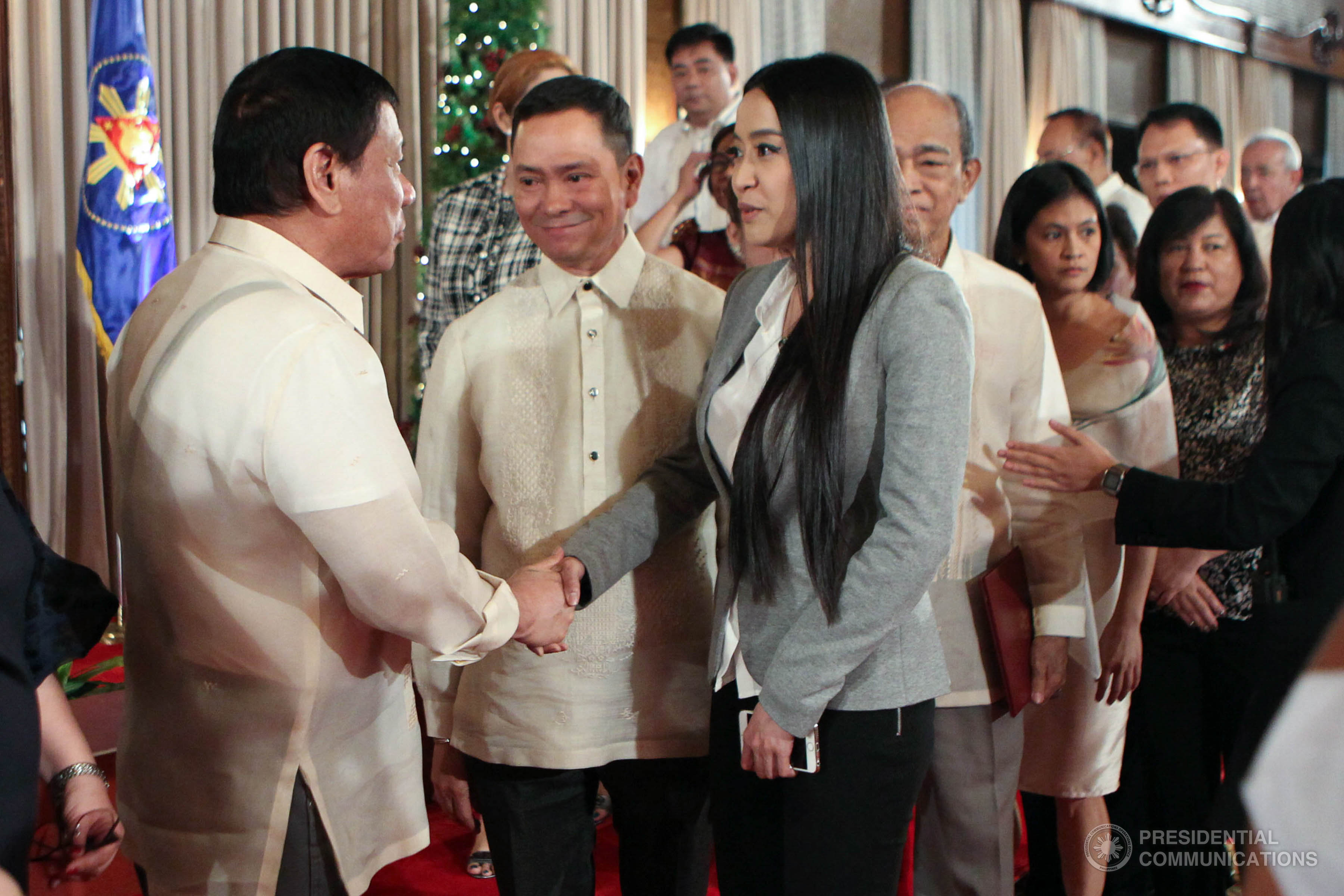
Uson greeting President Rodrigo Duterte at the Malacañang Palace following her appointment as an MTRCB board member, January 9, 2017

After Rodrigo Duterte's election as president of the Philippines, Uson became more involved in politics and later became a part of Duterte's administration.

In April 2017, Uson was part of the president's official delegation during his state visits to Saudi Arabia, Bahrain and Qatar. According to a presidential spokesman, she had a large number of followers from overseas Filipino communities, especially in the Middle East, and was brought along to boost morale and well-being.

==== MTRCB member ====
Executive Secretary Salvador Medialdea confirmed Uson's appointment to the MTRCB in a text message to Rappler on Thursday, January 5, 2017. As member of the board, Uson's was a member of a subcommittee tasked with reviewing movies, programs, and television shows for recommendations of disapproval. Her position at the MTRCB was set to expire on September 30, 2017, but she resigned on May 8, 2017, following her appointment as assistant secretary of the PCOO.

==== PCOO assistant secretary ====
On May 8, 2017, President Rodrigo Duterte appointed Uson as assistant secretary of the PCOO to handle its social media accounts.

Kris Aquino criticized Uson on her official Facebook account on June 5, 2018, for spreading misinformation about her parents, the late former president Corazon Aquino, and slain former senator Ninoy Aquino.

On October 3, 2018, during a Senate budget hearing, Uson stated that she had resigned as PCOO assistant secretary so that the PCOO's proposed 2019 budget could be passed.

==== Bureau of Customs ====
In early August 2016, after her exclusive interview with Bureau of Customs (BOC) commissioner Nicanor Faeldon for her blog, Uson was allegedly appointed a "social media consultant" by the Bureau. However, she later clarified through her Facebook page that she would not be holding an official position. She drew criticism from Filipino netizens who questioned her qualifications for the job and promoted the Twitter hashtag #DutertePleaseAppointMe to mock the ease of appointments in his government. Some netizens, however, supported Uson and asked the public to give her a chance.

The Bureau of Customs issued an official denial on its Twitter account stating: "Commissioner Nicanor Faeldon will not appoint Mocha Uson as BOC Social Media Consultant but she can write articles about BOC on her blog." Faeldon's chief of staff also clarified that “No papers are being prepared. Commissioner Faeldon did not sign any paper regarding Mocha’s appointment.”

Following this, Uson responded to her critics through an official statement and television interview. She confirmed that she would not be holding an official position at the Bureau of Customs, but reiterated her intent to voluntarily help the Duterte administration through social media. She also urged critics to "make good use of [their] time" by volunteering to help underprivileged children at the Department of Social Welfare and Development.

==== Overseas Workers Welfare Administration ====
On September 30, 2019, a new list of presidential appointees from Malacañang revealed that Uson had been appointed as deputy executive director of the Overseas Workers Welfare Administration (OWWA). Uson said she would have more time to focus on Overseas Filipino Worker's (OFW) needs, including the creation of a Department of OFWs.

Critics questioned Uson's competency and qualifications and called her appointment a "recycling of garbage" by the government, a waste of salary, a scam, and a disease.

Mocha was heavily criticized for supposedly violating a ban on mass gatherings when she visited quarantined overseas Filipino workers (OFWs) in Lian, Batangas.

=== 2022 elections ===
Uson supported the candidacy of Manila Mayor Isko Moreno for the 2022 Philippine presidential election, remarking that Moreno was like a younger version of Duterte. Uson was also a nominee of the Mothers for Change Party-list (MOCHA Party-list) which took part in the House of Representatives elections. The group has stated that its goal is to represent mothers even though Uson is not herself a mother. However, the group was unable to secure a seat in the 19th Congress.

=== 2025 candidacy for Manila city councilor ===
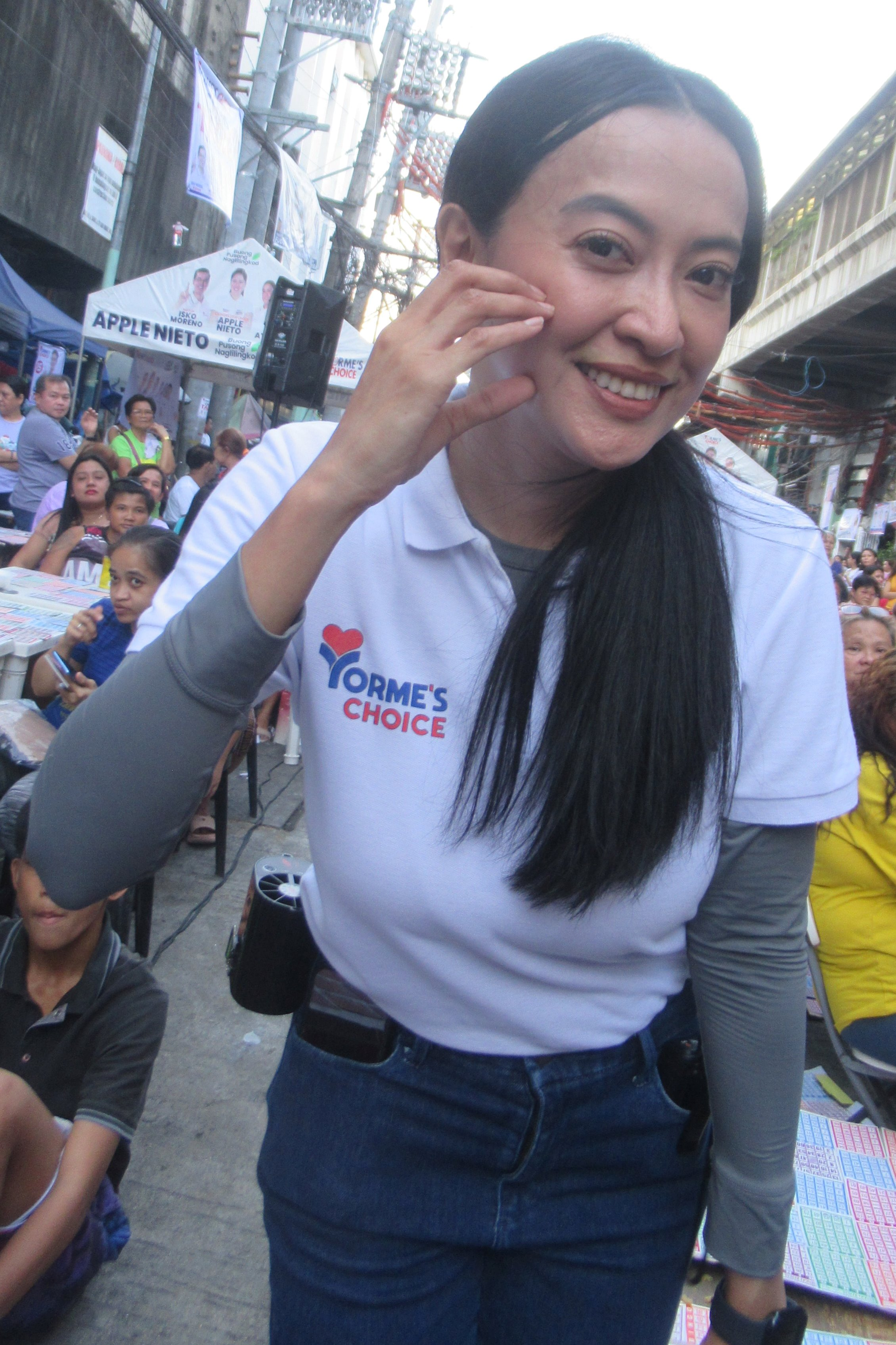
Uson as a Manila 3rd district councilor candidate in February 2025

In September 2024, Uson joined the Aksyon Demokratiko party and announced her candidacy for councilor of third district of Manila in the 2025 elections. She ran under the Yorme's Choice ticket of Isko Moreno, who successfully sought a comeback as mayor. However, she ultimately failed to clinch one of the six council seats for the district, finishing 10th.

=== As part of Isko Moreno's administration ===
In July 2025, Uson was named as a reporter on Yorme's Hour, a weekly program of the Manila city government under Mayor Isko Moreno.

== Criticisms and controversies ==
Uson previously hosted Mocha Uson Blog: Boses Ng Ordinaryong Pilipino, a radio commentary program which aired over DZRH. However, the program was suspended after the radio station received complaints regarding Uson's profane remarks against then-Vice President Leni Robredo.

Critics have also noted that Uson's monthly salary of ₱106,454.00 (equivalent to ₱116,891 in 2021) for her work at the Presidential Communications Operations Office (PCOO) was unusually high for a civil service employee.

Critics called for Uson to resign via social media activism and circulation of petitions.

=== Fake news and misinformation ===
Uson has been widely criticized for constantly propagating fake news and misinformation on her blog, earning her the nickname the "Queen of Fake News".

Notable incidents include:

- Posting a picture of praying Honduran soldiers with a call to prayer for Filipino soldiers. In her defense, Uson contended that she never claimed that the photo was that of members of the Philippine Army, and argued that the photo was only used as a visual aid or "symbolism".
- Using a news report published in October 2015—before Duterte's presidency—to praise the Philippine Department of Social Welfare and Development (DSWD) under the Duterte administration.
- Sharing a photo of a girl who had allegedly been raped and murdered by Filipino drug addicts and asking why there was no outrage from the Commission on Human Rights, when the photo had actually been taken in Brazil in 2014. Uson later took down her post.
- Attacking the administration and students of St. Scholastica's College for committing "child abuse by forcing young students to attend anti-Ferdinand Marcos burial rallies. However, attendance by the students at the rallies were purely voluntary and done with the permission of their parents.
- Sharing an article about a decorated policeman who was slain by drug dealers and challenging Vice President Leni Robredo, senators Bam Aquino, Antonio Trillanes, and Risa Hontiveros about when they would visit the wake, which had already occurred one year prior to her post.
- Citing the non-existent 263rd article of the Constitution of the Philippines in a commentary about a tax evasion case against the tobacco company Mighty Corp.
- On October 23, 2017, after Marawi was declared "liberated" following the deaths of the leaders of the Maute group, Uson posted an image of clean city streets, claiming that Duterte's government had moved fast, when in fact the photo had been taken on the third day of the Marawi siege.
- In November 2017, on the day after the ASEAN summit came to a close, Uson shared a post by RJ Nieto misquoting Canadian Prime Minister Justin Trudeau as saying: "Theoretically, it is impossible to get [the garbage] back ... even if it originally came from Canada", purportedly in reference to trash shipped to the Philippines from Canada. In fact, Trudeau's actual quote was "Even though it originally came from Canada, we had legal barriers and restrictions that prevented us from being able to take it back. Those regulations and those impediments have now been addressed, so it is now theoretically possible to get it back".
- In January 2018, Uson lashed out at critics over an award for government service that she had received from the University of Santo Tomas Alumni Association, stating that the controversy was being used to cover up issues over Dengvaxia in the Philippines, former Senator Franklin Drilon's receiving of funds from Janet Lim-Napoles, and the continuing eruption of Mayon Volcano in Naga, Camarines Sur. However, Mayon Volcano is located in Albay Province in the Bicol Region. Netizens and celebrities reacted on social media on Uson's gaffe, flooding the Internet with memes. Uson later apologized for her "tiny mistake", but continued to accuse critics of silence over the issues of Dengvaxia and the death of UST law student Atio Castillo from fraternity hazing. The latter claim was also false as Castillo's death had drawn public outrage, rallies, and resurrected calls for stricter anti-hazing laws in the Philippines.
- On January 15, 2020, Uson falsely claimed that Vice President Leni Robredo gave only 5 pieces of pandesal (small bread buns) and a bottle of water to refugees from the 2020 Taal Volcano eruption, spent more on media coverage than Taal relief goods, and engaged in photo ops before helping victims of the tragedy. In actuality, Robredo and her staff were able to distribute 2,101 food packs containing 1.5 kilograms (3.3 lb) of rice, assorted canned goods, and two packs of noodles to residents in evacuation centers in the towns of Sta. Teresita, San Jose, and Sto. Tomas, as well as 1,000 face masks to the evacuees through Robredo's Angat Buhay program. Robredo commented, "Parang masyado namang petty na pag-awayan pa namin iyong laman. Pero iyong pinakapunto ko: bakit hinahayaan natin na iyong nagpapakalat ng fake news, sinusuwelduhan pa ng pamahalaan?" ("Isn't it really petty that we'd fight over the contents? But my main point is, why are we allowing a peddler of fake news to still receive a government salary?") Robredo added: "Pera natin ito. Hindi naman ito pera ng kung sinong government official. Pero para hayaan mo na pera natin iyong ginagamit para lasunin iyong isip ng ating mga kababayan, tingin ko malaking kasalanan iyon." ("That's our money. This is not the money of some government official. But to allow our money to poison the thoughts of our country-mates, I think it's a big sin.") According to Robredo, Uson's lies were an insult to the volunteers who helped repack the donations.
- On April 2, 2020, Uson posted photos showing personal protective equipment that were supposedly bought by the government and distributed to health workers. It was revealed that one of the photos she used was from the SM Foundation. The photo was replaced one day later.
- On August 5, 2021, the Manila City Public Information Office flagged a post on her blog that claimed that a photo of a large crowd that was waiting outside a shopping mall that was not observing social distancing in a time of COVID-19 was from the city. The photo was actually from Rizal Province.

Filipino senators have also criticized Uson for continuously spreading fake news. Senator Nancy Binay questioned Uson's role in the PCOO, asking Secretary Martin Andanar: "How can you fight fake news kung may instances na nanggagaling mismo sa isang Asec yung fake news?" ("when there are instances when the Assistant Secretary herself is the source of fake news?").

In September 2017, Senator Antonio Trillanes IV filed administrative and criminal complaints against Uson for spreading fake news that he owned offshore bank accounts and for other alleged unlawful acts. The lawmaker also filed graft charges against Uson for allegedly using her position to propagate false information.

In April 2018, an administrative complaint was filed against Uson by Akbayan Youth before the Office of the Ombudsman over posting misleading content on her Facebook page, with the charges of grave misconduct, serious dishonesty, and conduct prejudicial to the best interest of the service. Uson did not attempt to defend herself against the charges, but rather made a joke thanking the complainants for giving her the idea of starting her own coffee shop business which she would call "Fire Mocha Café", named after the hashtag #FireMocha used by the complainants.

In a 2016 interview with Ricky Lo for The Philippine Star, Uson was asked whether she sleeps soundly at night despite the "ruckus" created by her writings, and she stated: "Yes. I sleep soundly at night knowing that I am fighting for the right side. There is a war going on between good and evil. My mission is to separate truth from lies, light from darkness and good from evil."

Data research and analysis done by Philippine news website Rappler has shown that Uson has routinely shared posts from Philippine fake news websites.

=== "Pepe-dede-ralismo" controversy ===
In August 2018, Uson was criticized for sharing a video on the government's position on federalism that included vulgarity and sexually-explicit content. In the video, Uson urged her co-host Drew Olivar to do a raunchy dance, touching his crotch and rubbing his chest while singing "I-pepe, i-pepe. I-dede, i-dede. I-pede, pede, pede, pederalismo". (transl. "Pussy it, pussy it, boobs it, boobs it. Fede it, fede, fede, federalism"). After Olivar's dance, Uson called for applause during the video.

Days after describing Mocha Uson's inclusion in the federalism campaign as a "beautiful decision" and a "brilliant idea", then Senate President Koko Pimentel admitted to being wrong about Uson and described the video as "filthy" and that it opposed the message that the administration intended to convey.

Due to complaints, the Ombudsman of the Philippines Samuel Martires ordered Uson to submit comments explaining her Pepe-dede-ralismo dance campaign before his office, and clarified that even though Uson had recently resigned from her position at PCOO, she would still be held accountable for possible criminal and administrative proceedings.

=== Mockery of the deaf ===
In September 2018, Uson released another video in which she mocked sign language. In the video, Uson's co-host blogger Drew Olivar pantomimed sign language with Uson laughing commenting "Para kang unggoy diyan" (transl. "you're like a monkey there"). Deaf advocacy groups protested the video as degrading.

The Commission on Human Rights (CHR) investigated a complaint filed by the Philippine Federation of the Deaf, and described the video as "utterly appalling and unacceptable".

=== Red-tagging and criminal and administrative complaints ===
Uson has been criticized for red-tagging university students, Lumad educators, activists, and human rights workers.

In December 2020, human rights group Karapatan filed criminal and administrative complaints against Uson and other government officials for alleged violations of Republic Act No. 9851 or the Philippine Act on Crimes Against International Humanitarian Law, Genocide, and Other Crimes Against Humanity. According to Karapatan, red-tagging activities by Uson fall under crimes against humanity of persecution.

=== Double-meaning 2025 campaign jingle ===
In April 2025, Uson was criticized over her campaign jingle for her Manila councilor campaign featuring the double-meaning lyric "Cookie ni Mocha, ang sarap-sarap" (transl. "Mocha's cookie, it's very delicious"), which was deemed sexually suggestive and objectifying (as cookie rhymes with puki or puke, the main Filipino word for vagina). The Commission on Elections (COMELEC) warned her, expressing concern that such content could detract from serious policy discussions and urged her to adopt a more appropriate campaign approach. She later asked her campaign team to drop the jingle.

=== Political stance ===
==== Reproductive Health Law ====
In May 2011, Uson, along with other pro-reproductive health advocates went to the Batasang Pambansa Complex, the headquarters of the House of Representatives of the Philippines, to call for the passage of House Bill No. 4244, better known as the Reproductive Health Bill. The Reproductive Health Bill was passed by both the House of Representatives and the Senate, therefore becoming the Responsible Parenthood and Reproductive Health Act of 2012 (Republic Act No. 10354) also known as the Reproductive Health Law. She then challenged the Catholic Church to excommunicate her for supporting the aforementioned bill. Uson has also expressed her support for effective sex education in schools.

==== Vice Presidency of Leni Robredo ====
On April 2, 2017, critics of Vice President Leni Robredo held a rally called "Palit Bise" (lit. 'Change the Vice [President]') calling for the legal removal of the vice president from the office. According to Uson, the movement aimed to oust Robredo due to her alleged lack of support for the Duterte administration, either by means of impeachment or voluntary resignation.

== Personal life ==
Uson is openly bisexual. She calls herself "an open-minded Catholic," but has suggested that the Catholic Bishops' Conference of the Philippines is the antichrist.

== Electoral history ==
Electoral history of Mocha Uson
Year	Office	Party	Votes received				Result
Year	Office	Party	Total	%	P.	Swing	Result
2022	Representative (Party-list)	Mothers for Change	64,785	0.18%	132nd	—N/a	Lost
2025	Councilor (Manila–3rd)	Aksyon	31,103	27.04%	10th	—N/a	Lost

== Discography ==
=== Studio albums ===
with Mocha Girls

- A Taste of Mocha (2006; XAX Records)
- Mocha (2007; Viva Records)
- Deliciosa (2008; Viva Records)
- Pinay Ako (2012; Bellhaus Entertainment)

== Filmography ==
=== Television ===
- Twin Hearts
- Umagang Kay Ganda
- Wowowee
- ASAP
- SOP
- Music Uplate Live
- Cool Center
- Everybody Hapi
- Comedy Bar
- P.O.5 (2010–2011)
- Family Feud

=== Film ===
Year	Title	Role	Notes
2009	Sumpa	Jackie	
2011	Seksing Masahista	Mona	Malaysian-Philippine co-production
2011	So Much Pain So in Love	Commercial model/singer	
2012	Butas 2	Pia	
2013	Four Sisters and a Wedding	Mocha	Cameo
2013	Mga Alaala ng Tag-ulan	Claire	

=== Other appearances ===
- Good Times with Mo: The Podcast
- Get It Straight with Daniel Razon

== See also ==
- Fake news in the Philippines
- Diehard Duterte Supporters
- Sass Rogando Sasot
- RJ Nieto
