= Mocha Uson Blog =

Filipino political blog run by Mocha Uson

- Mocha Uson Blog logo
- Website type: Facebook Page / Blog
- Available in: English, Filipino
- Owner: Mocha Productions
- Creator: Mocha Uson
- Website: https://facebook.com/MochaBlogger
- Commercial: No
- Launched: Blog site: 2006; 20 years ago
- Current status: Active

Mocha Uson Blog is a blog site by Filipino entertainer, political blogger, and public official, Mocha Uson. A former standalone blog site, it is currently a Facebook page, after www.mocha.com.ph went defunct in February 2017.

== History ==
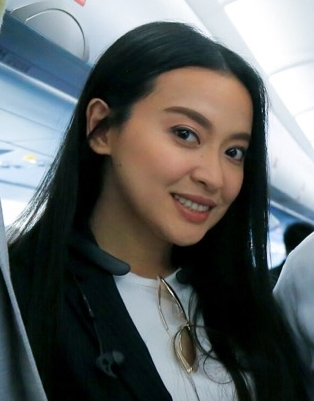
Mocha Uson, the creator and founder of Mocha Uson Blog

The Mocha Uson Blog previously concentrated on giving sex-related tips or advice. It also featured 'sessions in the bedroom' with her all-female group, the Mocha Girls. According to her, it later became a platform for Filipinos to express their concerns which are relayed by Mocha to the national government. The page became an online political advocacy tool by Uson to promote the 2016 presidential campaign of Rodrigo Duterte and by October 2016 most of the sex-themed videos hosted by the page were already deleted but copies remain accessible through other non-related YouTube accounts.

The Facebook page's followers increased to 4 million after Uson became a vocal supporter of President Rodrigo Duterte. According to Uson, the Facebook page had "quite a number of followers" before she became a public supporter of Duterte.

When then-President-elect Duterte decided to boycott mainstream media organizations, Uson declared support for Duterte and managed to secure an exclusive interview with Duterte in June 2016. Videos of the interview were posted on the Mocha Uson Blog page.

Mocha Uson Blog, aside from being hosted in a Facebook page, had a separate blog site which was hosted at https://mocha.com.ph/. But by October 2016, the blog site only hosted external links to accounts managed by Mocha Uson including the Mocha Uson Blog Facebook page. By February 2017, blog site is already defunct.

By January 2018, a mobile app version of the blog became available for download in iOS and Android devices.

As of March 20, 2020, the blog is not searchable on Facebook. On Twitter, the hashtag #MochaUsonisOverParty became the number one trend in the Philippines before the blog became unsearchable. The hashtag users sought to encourage people to mass report the blog. Few days later, her Facebook page resurfaced again online.

== Content ==
Mocha Uson Blog (mobile app)
- Developer: Cloud Panda PH
- Release: 2017; 9 years ago
- Stable release: 1.2 / 2 November 2017; 8 years ago
- Operating system: iOS, Android

Mocha Uson Blog has focused on publishing sex-related content before transitioning to politics during the 2016 Philippine national elections.

The mobile application version of the blog developed by Cloud Panda PH Inc. allows users to post videos, text, and videos as well as access features such as Mocha TV, DDS Podcast, and OFW Help.

== Notable posts ==
=== Pepederalismo ===
In August 2018, a video uploaded by Mocha Uson Blog featuring a blogger named Drew Olivar and Mocha Uson herself garnered nationwide attention and criticism. The live video, dubbed as "Pepedederalismo" by the media, was criticized for being lewd and obscene. The video showed Olivar dancing in a sexually suggestive manner by repeatedly touching his crotch and chest while singing lyrics about "pepederalismo", a portmanteau of federalism and the colloquial terms for vagina (pekpek) and breasts (dede). Uson said there was "nothing wrong with the video", which she said was meant to generate conversation among Filipinos about the concept of federalism. She said the jingle was not part of the government's official information campaign on the topic. She also said that she did not receive any government funding to produce the controversial video, albeit it wasn't immediately clear if she recorded the video during her working hours as a government employee.

=== Disrespecting sign language ===
In September 2018, Mocha Uson and co-blogger Drew Olivar drew flak from netizens and criticism from deaf advocates and Filipinos for posting a video that made fun of sign language.

== Reception ==
According to one news article published by PhilStar, the then-defunct Mocha Uson Blog website www.mocha.com.ph had 20 million hits in 2016, making it a popular website. The Facebook page of Mocha Uson Blog had over 4.5 million followers during that year, while its mobile application has been downloaded more than 10,000 times as of 2018. As of 22 September 2021, the website was set up to redirect to a Twitter account with the handle @PhilippinesPHP, with the domain name having been taken over by another unconnected entity per its WHOIS record.

Vincent Lazatin of executive director of the Transparency and Accountability Network has criticized Mocha Uson Blog for its polarizing content. Maria Ressa of Rappler has also criticized the blog for allegedly being a pro-Duterte propaganda tool that "takes advantage of Facebook algorithm".

Ateneo de Manila University student journalists published a pamphlet titled Mochang Tanga Blog that tackled social issues and parodied Mocha Uson Blog.

A Change.org petition advocating the removal of Mocha Uson Blog from Facebook was launched in 2016 by a certain Paul Quilet. It had gathered 35,000 signatures as of October 24, 2016.

== See also ==
- Duterte Diehard Supporters
- RJ Nieto
- Mocha Uson
