= Mocha Girls =

Filipina girl group

- Origin: Manila, Philippines
- Genres: Pop, P-pop, dance
- Years active: 2006–2022 (on hiatus)
- Labels: XAX Music Entertainment; Viva; Bellhaus
- Members: Chloe Recto; Renzy Silvestre; Jade Dela Peña; Princess Chan; Rica Mae Sanchez
- Past members: Mocha Uson; Hershey de las Alas; Heart de Guzman; Grace Oracion; Bez Lacanlale; Francoise "Franz" Fainsan; Mae Dela Cerna; Jhane Santiaguel; Khim Dueñas; Aki Mitu; Neri Germina; Coleen Cerda; Mishka Kagami; Zyra Green; Angel Clavario; Zsara Tiblani; Maria Fheb Vida; Jho Ann Sotelo; Aura Joy Balington; Seika Hashizume; Pepper Gutierrez; Georgina Knight; Shaina Salazar; Yumi Ociman; Joy Basa

Mocha Girls is an all-female singing and dancing group from the Philippines. The current line-up consists of members Chloe Recto, Renzy Silvestre, Jade Dela Peña, Princess Chan and Rica Mae Sanchez. The Mocha Girls have released four albums: A Taste of Mocha (2006), Mocha (2007), Deliciosa (2008), and Pinay Ako (2012).

The Mocha Girls rose to fame partly due to lead vocalist Mocha Uson's adult-themed antics and her online blog that specializes in offering sex advice to couples. The Mocha Girls are considered as "the hottest sing and dance group in the Philippines".

== History ==
Formed in 2006, the original members were Mocha Uson, Hershey de las Alas, Heart de Guzman, Grace Oracion and Bez Lacanlale. In early 2010, the four members separated from Uson to form their own group, Girlz Ink. This led to the addition of new members Mae Dela Cerna and Jhane Santiaguel, later followed by the arrival of Yumi Ociman, and then Aura Balington. After Santiaguel left the group, she was replaced by Franz Fainsan in 2011.

In 2012, Chloe Recto joined, shortly followed by the departure of Balington, bringing the group back down to five members; Mocha Uson still remaining as the group's leader and only original member. In 2013, Recto left the group due to reasons surrounding work commitments. Two new members were officially added to the group in April 2013, Seika Hashizume and Georgina Knight. On April 30, 2013, it was announced that Hashizume was no longer part of the Mocha Girls, for personal reasons which affected work commitments. On July 9, 2013, Seika Hashizume was officially reinstated as a member of the Mocha Girls. On July 28, 2013, it was announced that Yumi Ociman was no longer part of the group, due to violating the "No. 1 rule" of Mocha Girls which is all members are not allowed to be in a relationship or simply, "no boyfriend". After being given the choice, she chose her boyfriend over Mocha Girls. On September 21, 2013, Jhane Santiaguel was reinstated as member of Mocha Girls after leaving her partner to concentrate on her career.

In 2014, several trainees joined the girls for training sessions in the hope of becoming a member of Mocha Girls. Trainee Jho Ann Sotelo became an official member of the group in March 2014. Sabrina Turner then joined as trainee then voluntarily quit training in April. Pepper Gutierrez then joined as trainee; in July she became a member of the group. On July 21, it was announced that Sotelo had quit the group for a change of career. In November, Sabrina Turner returned as trainee then left yet again. In 2015, Khim Dueñas joined as trainee and then became a member of the group. A "sister band" of the group called Mocha Babes, formed in 2015, includes former Mocha Girl Chloe Recto. In December, Josh Mac joined as a trainee. Khim Dueñas was relieved from the group on January 19, 2016 having chosen to prioritize other commitments.

In 2017, Seika Hashizume, Pepper Gutierrez and Georgina Knight became members of another dance girl group, Gummy Baes.

== Performances and tours ==
The Mocha Girls regularly perform at various venues around Manila, and have toured and performed abroad in countries in the Middle East and Asia, as well as in other regions of the Philippines.

Throughout November and into early December 2012, the girls toured and performed shows for the first time in various parts of the US and Canada. In 2013, a second tour of the US took place in February and March and again in Canada in November.

Another tour took place from October to December 2014. They performed in the UAE, the United Kingdom and Ireland, and Japan.

=== Arrest in Malaysia ===
On September 4, 2015, the six-member Mocha Girls and their promoter arrived in Kuala Lumpur from Thailand for the final leg of their world tour. While rendering their second song number, Malaysian Immigration authorities conducted a raid at the hotel they were performing in. The Malaysian authorities asked to see their passports and work permit. As the show's producer failed to produce the work permit, the Mocha Girls were taken into custody and detained in the Malaysian Immigration prison for five days. In prison, they were initially "treated as ordinary criminals" until the Malaysian authorities learned that the Mocha Girls were legitimate artists and professional performers in the Philippines. With the cooperation of the Department of Foreign Affairs, the Philippine Embassy, and the Immigration Department of Malaysia, the Mocha Girls were released without charges, but were fined instead.

The girl group denied rumors that their "sexy performances" were the reason behind their arrest, and added that necessary legal action would be taken against the producer of their show in Malaysia.

== Members ==
Current

- Chloe Recto (since 2015)
- Renzy Silvestre (since 2017)
- Jade Dela Peña (since 2016)
- Princess Chan (since 2016)
- Rica Mae Sanchez (since 2019)

Past members

- Mocha Uson (2006–2018)
- Hershey de las Alas (2006–2010)
- Heart de Guzman (2006–2010)
- Grace Oracion (2006–2010)
- Bez Lacanlale (2006–2010)
- Mae Dela Cerna (2010–2015)
- Francoise Denyse "Franz" Fainsan (2011–2019)
- Seika Hashizume
- Pepper Gutierrez
- Georgina Knight
- Shaina Salazar
- Jhane Santiaguel (2010–2011)
- Khim Dueñas (2015, 2017–2018)
- Aki Mitu (2016–2017)
- Neri Germina (2018–2019)
- Coleen Cerda (2018–2019)
- Mishka Kagami (since 2015)
- Zyra Green (2017)
- Angel Clavario (2017)
- Zsara Tiblani (2018)

== Discography ==
=== Studio albums ===
- 2006: A Taste of Mocha (XAX Music Entertainment)
- 2007: Mocha (Viva Records)
- 2008: Deliciosa (Viva Records)
- 2012: Pinay Ako / 18+ Restricted (Bellhaus Records)

== Awards ==
- 2009 PMPC Star Awards for Music: Best Dance Album (Deliciosa)
- 2012 PMPC Star Awards for Music: Best Dance Album (18+ Restricted)
