= List of accolades received by TV Patrol =

TV Patrol accolades
Awards and nominations
Award	Wins	Nominations
Asian Television Awards	0	3
Catholic Mass Media Awards	2	2
Gawad Tanglaw	5	5
Golden Screen TV Awards	0	7
International Emmy Awards Current Affairs & News	0	2
KBP Golden Dove Awards	6	6
PMPC Star Awards for Television	33	86

Totals (Note: Certain award groups do not simply award one winner. They acknowledge several different recipients, have runners-up, and have third place. Since this is a specific recognition and is different from losing an award, runner-up mentions are considered wins in this award tally. For simplification and to avoid errors, each award in this list has been presumed to have had a prior nomination.)
- Wins: 44
- Nominations: 100

TV Patrol is a Philippine television newscast that premiered on ABS-CBN on March 2, 1987. It focuses on reportage of present-day events, incorporating disparate segments that appear recurringly. (Note: Each segment has a unique topic, such as entertainment or weather.) TV Patrol initially featured Noli de Castro, Mel Tiangco, and Robert Arevalo; the newscast's anchors have changed significantly during its run.

TV Patrol is the longest-running Filipino-language newscast. It has enjoyed consistently high viewership on broadcast television, according to AGB Nielsen Philippines and Kantar Media Philippines. The newscast has had a significant impact on social media and television as a result of the COVID-19 pandemic and the shutdown of ABS-CBN broadcasting, expanding its livestreaming to worldwide.

TV Patrol has garnered awards and nominations in various categories. It has won six KBP Golden Dove Awards. The newscast has received seven Golden Screen TV Award nominations and eighty-six for PMPC Star Awards for Television (winning thirty-three). TV Patrol was nominated for three Asian Television Awards and two International Emmy Awards Current Affairs & News.

== Accolades ==
Accolades received by TV Patrol
Award	Year (Note: Indicates the year of ceremony. Each year is linked to the article about the awards held that year, wherever possible.)	Category	Recipient(s)	Result	Ref.
Asian Television Awards	2006	Best News Program	TV Patrol	Nominated	
Asian Television Awards	2007	Best News Program	"Taguig Hostage Drama"	Nominated	
Asian Television Awards	2014	Best News Program	"Haiyan's Fury"	Nominated	
Catholic Mass Media Awards	2000	Best News Program	TV Patrol	Won	
Catholic Mass Media Awards	2010	Best News Program	TV Patrol	Won (Note: Tied with Saksi.)	
Gawad Tanglaw	2009	Best News Program	TV Patrol	Won (Note: Tied with 24 Oras.)	
Gawad Tanglaw	2010	Best News Program	TV Patrol	Won	
Gawad Tanglaw	2011	Best News Program	TV Patrol	Won	
Gawad Tanglaw	2016	Best News Program	TV Patrol	Won	
Gawad Tanglaw	2020	Best News Program	TV Patrol	Won (Note: Tied with TV Patrol Weekend.)	
Golden Screen TV Awards	2013	Outstanding News Program	TV Patrol	Nominated	
Golden Screen TV Awards	2013	Outstanding Male News Presenter	Ted Failon	Nominated	
Golden Screen TV Awards	2013	Outstanding Female News Presenter	Korina Sanchez	Nominated	
Golden Screen TV Awards	2014	Outstanding News Program	TV Patrol	Nominated	
Golden Screen TV Awards	2014	Outstanding Male News Presenter	Ted Failon	Nominated	
Golden Screen TV Awards	2015	Outstanding News Program	TV Patrol	Nominated	
Golden Screen TV Awards	2015	Outstanding Male News Presenter	Ted Failon	Nominated	
International Emmy Awards Current Affairs & News	2011	Best News	"Manila Hostage Crisis"	Nominated	
International Emmy Awards Current Affairs & News	2017	Best News	Super Typhoon Lawin aftermath	Nominated	
KBP Golden Dove Awards	2004	Outstanding News Program (TV Metro Manila)	TV Patrol	Won	
KBP Golden Dove Awards	2004	Outstanding Newscaster (TV Metro Manila)	Korina Sanchez	Won	
KBP Golden Dove Awards	2005	Best TV Newscast Program (National)	TV Patrol	Won	
KBP Golden Dove Awards	2008	Best Newscaster	Ted Failon	Won	
KBP Golden Dove Awards	2009	Best TV Newscast Program	TV Patrol	Won	
KBP Golden Dove Awards	2013	Best TV Newscast Program	TV Patrol	Won	
PMPC Star Awards for Television	1987	Best News Program	TV Patrol	Won	
PMPC Star Awards for Television	1987	Best Male Newscaster	Noli de Castro	Won	
PMPC Star Awards for Television	1988	Best Male Newscaster	Noli de Castro	Won	
PMPC Star Awards for Television	1992	Best News Program	TV Patrol	Won	
PMPC Star Awards for Television	1992	Best Male Newscaster	Frankie Evangelista	Won	
PMPC Star Awards for Television	2001	Best Male Newscaster	Henry Omaga-Diaz	Won	
PMPC Star Awards for Television	2002	Best Male Newscaster	Henry Omaga-Diaz	Won	
PMPC Star Awards for Television	2003	Best News Program	TV Patrol	Won	
PMPC Star Awards for Television	2003	Best Male Newscaster	Julius Babao	Won	
PMPC Star Awards for Television	2003	Best Male Newscaster	Henry Omaga-Diaz	Nominated	
PMPC Star Awards for Television	2003	Best Female Newscaster	Korina Sanchez	Won	
PMPC Star Awards for Television	2004	Best Male Newscaster	Julius Babao	Won (Note: Tied with Martin Andanar for Big News.)	
PMPC Star Awards for Television	2005	Best News Program	TV Patrol	Won	
PMPC Star Awards for Television	2005	Best Male Newscaster	Julius Babao	Won	
PMPC Star Awards for Television	2005	Best Male Newscaster	Ted Failon	Nominated	
PMPC Star Awards for Television	2005	Best Female Newscaster	Karen Davila	Nominated	
PMPC Star Awards for Television	2006	Best News Program	TV Patrol	Won	
PMPC Star Awards for Television	2006	Best Male Newscaster	Julius Babao	Won	
PMPC Star Awards for Television	2007	Best News Program	TV Patrol	Nominated	
PMPC Star Awards for Television	2007	Best Male Newscaster	Julius Babao	Won (Note: Tied with Alex Santos for TV Patrol Sabado.)	
PMPC Star Awards for Television	2007	Best Male Newscaster	Ted Failon	Nominated	
PMPC Star Awards for Television	2007	Best Male Newscaster	Alex Santos	Won (Note: Tied with Julius Babao for TV Patrol.)	
PMPC Star Awards for Television	2007	Best Female Newscaster	Karen Davila	Nominated	
PMPC Star Awards for Television	2007	Best Female Newscaster	Bernadette Sembrano	Nominated	
PMPC Star Awards for Television	2008	Best News Program	TV Patrol	Won	
PMPC Star Awards for Television	2008	Best Male Newscaster	Julius Babao	Won	
PMPC Star Awards for Television	2008	Best Male Newscaster	Ted Failon	Nominated	
PMPC Star Awards for Television	2008	Best Male Newscaster	Alex Santos	Nominated	
PMPC Star Awards for Television	2008	Best Female Newscaster	Karen Davila	Nominated	
PMPC Star Awards for Television	2009	Best News Program	TV Patrol	Won	
PMPC Star Awards for Television	2009	Best Male Newscaster	Julius Babao	Won	
PMPC Star Awards for Television	2009	Best Male Newscaster	Ted Failon	Nominated	
PMPC Star Awards for Television	2009	Best Male Newscaster	Henry Omaga-Diaz	Nominated	
PMPC Star Awards for Television	2009	Best Male Newscaster	Alex Santos	Nominated	
PMPC Star Awards for Television	2009	Best Female Newscaster	Karen Davila	Nominated	
PMPC Star Awards for Television	2010	Best News Program	TV Patrol	Won	
PMPC Star Awards for Television	2010	Best Male Newscaster	Julius Babao	Won	
PMPC Star Awards for Television	2010	Best Male Newscaster	Ted Failon	Nominated	
PMPC Star Awards for Television	2010	Best Male Newscaster	Alex Santos	Nominated	
PMPC Star Awards for Television	2010	Best Female Newscaster	Karen Davila	Won	
PMPC Star Awards for Television	2011	Best News Program	TV Patrol	Nominated	
PMPC Star Awards for Television	2011	Best Male Newscaster	Julius Babao	Nominated	
PMPC Star Awards for Television	2011	Best Male Newscaster	Ted Failon	Nominated	
PMPC Star Awards for Television	2011	Best Male Newscaster	Noli de Castro	Nominated	
PMPC Star Awards for Television	2011	Best Male Newscaster	Alex Santos	Nominated	
PMPC Star Awards for Television	2011	Best Female Newscaster	Karen Davila	Nominated	
PMPC Star Awards for Television	2011	Best Female Newscaster	Korina Sanchez	Nominated	
PMPC Star Awards for Television	2012	Best News Program	TV Patrol	Nominated	
PMPC Star Awards for Television	2012	Best Male Newscaster	Ted Failon	Won	
PMPC Star Awards for Television	2012	Best Male Newscaster	Noli de Castro	Nominated	
PMPC Star Awards for Television	2012	Best Female Newscaster	Korina Sanchez	Nominated	
PMPC Star Awards for Television	2013	Best News Program	TV Patrol	Nominated	
PMPC Star Awards for Television	2013	Best Male Newscaster	Julius Babao	Won	
PMPC Star Awards for Television	2013	Best Male Newscaster	Ted Failon	Nominated	
PMPC Star Awards for Television	2013	Best Male Newscaster	Noli de Castro	Nominated	
PMPC Star Awards for Television	2013	Best Female Newscaster	Korina Sanchez	Nominated	
PMPC Star Awards for Television	2014	Best News Program	TV Patrol	Nominated	
PMPC Star Awards for Television	2014	Best Male Newscaster	Ted Failon	Nominated	
PMPC Star Awards for Television	2014	Best Male Newscaster	Noli de Castro	Nominated	
PMPC Star Awards for Television	2014	Best Female Newscaster	Korina Sanchez	Nominated	
PMPC Star Awards for Television	2015	Best News Program	TV Patrol	Nominated	
PMPC Star Awards for Television	2015	Best Male Newscaster	Ted Failon	Nominated	
PMPC Star Awards for Television	2015	Best Male Newscaster	Noli de Castro	Nominated	
PMPC Star Awards for Television	2015	Best Female Newscaster	Korina Sanchez	Nominated	
PMPC Star Awards for Television	2016	Best News Program	TV Patrol	Won	
PMPC Star Awards for Television	2016	Best Male Newscaster	Ted Failon	Nominated	
PMPC Star Awards for Television	2016	Best Male Newscaster	Noli de Castro	Nominated	
PMPC Star Awards for Television	2016	Best Female Newscaster	Bernadette Sembrano	Nominated	
PMPC Star Awards for Television	2017	Best News Program	TV Patrol	Won	
PMPC Star Awards for Television	2017	Best Male Newscaster	Ted Failon	Nominated	
PMPC Star Awards for Television	2017	Best Male Newscaster	Noli de Castro	Nominated	
PMPC Star Awards for Television	2017	Best Female Newscaster	Bernadette Sembrano	Won	
PMPC Star Awards for Television	2018	Best News Program	TV Patrol	Won	
PMPC Star Awards for Television	2018	Best Male Newscaster	Ted Failon	Nominated	
PMPC Star Awards for Television	2018	Best Male Newscaster	Noli de Castro	Nominated	
PMPC Star Awards for Television	2018	Best Female Newscaster	Bernadette Sembrano	Won	
PMPC Star Awards for Television	2019	Best News Program	TV Patrol	Won	
PMPC Star Awards for Television	2019	Best Male Newscaster	Ted Failon	Nominated	
PMPC Star Awards for Television	2019	Best Male Newscaster	Noli de Castro	Nominated	
PMPC Star Awards for Television	2019	Best Male Newscaster	Alvin Elchico	Nominated	
PMPC Star Awards for Television	2019	Best Female Newscaster	Bernadette Sembrano	Nominated	
PMPC Star Awards for Television	2021	Best News Program	TV Patrol	Won	
PMPC Star Awards for Television	2021	Best Male Newscaster	Ted Failon	Nominated	
PMPC Star Awards for Television	2021	Best Male Newscaster	Noli de Castro	Nominated	
PMPC Star Awards for Television	2021	Best Male Newscaster	Alvin Elchico	Nominated	
PMPC Star Awards for Television	2021	Best Female Newscaster	Bernadette Sembrano	Nominated	
