= PMPC Star Award for Best News Program =

The PMPC Star Awards for Best News Program are given to the best television newscasts of the year and also male and female newscasters in the Philippines.

== Winners ==
=== Best News Program ===
1987: TV Patrol (ABS-CBN 2)

1988:

1989: GMA Balita (GMA 7)

1990:

1991: GMA Balita (GMA 7)

1992: TV Patrol (ABS-CBN 2)

1993: GMA Network News (GMA-7)

1994: GMA Balita (GMA 7)

1995: GMA Network News (GMA-7)

1996: The World Tonight (ABS-CBN 2)

1997: The World Tonight (ABS-CBN 2)

1998: Saksi (GMA 7)

1999: GMA Network News (GMA-7)

2000: Frontpage: Ulat ni Mel Tiangco (GMA 7)

2001: Frontpage: Ulat ni Mel Tiangco (GMA 7)

2002: Frontpage: Ulat ni Mel Tiangco (GMA 7)

2003: TV Patrol (ABS-CBN 2)

2004: TV Patrol (ABS-CBN 2)

2005: TV Patrol World (ABS-CBN 2)

2006: 24 Oras (GMA 7) & TV Patrol World (ABS-CBN 2) [tied]

2007: Bandila (ABS-CBN 2)

2008: TV Patrol World (ABS-CBN 2)

2009: TV Patrol World (ABS-CBN 2)

2010: TV Patrol World (ABS-CBN 2)

2011: 24 Oras (GMA 7)

2012: TV Patrol 25 (ABS-CBN 2)

2013: State of the Nation with Jessica Soho (GMA News TV)

2014: State of the Nation with Jessica Soho (GMA News TV)

2015: State of the Nation with Jessica Soho (GMA News TV)

2016: 24 Oras (GMA 7) & TV Patrol (ABS-CBN 2) [tied]

2017: TV Patrol (ABS-CBN 2)

2018: TV Patrol (ABS-CBN 2)

2019: TV Patrol (ABS-CBN 2)

2020: TV Patrol (ABS-CBN 2)

2021: 24 Oras (GMA 7)

2023: 24 Oras (GMA 7)

2024: Agenda (Bilyonaryo News Channel)

Notes:

- TV Patrol is the longest-running News Program since 1987. They have 20 nominations (including TV Patrol World) & 15 won awards

=== Best Male Newscasters ===
1987: Noli de Castro (TV Patrol / ABS-CBN 2)

1988: Noli de Castro (TV Patrol / ABS-CBN 2)

1989: Bobby Guanzon (GMA Balita / GMA 7)

1990: TG Kintanar (Headline 13 / IBC 13)

1991: Jose Mari Velez (GMA Headline News / GMA 7)

1992: Frankie Evangelista (TV Patrol / ABS-CBN 2)

1993: Bobby Guanzon (GMA Balita / GMA 7)

1994:

1995: Angelo Castro, Jr. (The World Tonight / ABS-CBN 2)

1996:

1997: Mike Enriquez (Saksi / GMA 7)

1998: Angelo Castro, Jr. (The World Tonight / ABS-CBN 2)

1999:

2000: Mike Enriquez (Saksi / GMA 7)

2001: Henry Omaga-Diaz (TV Patrol /ABS-CBN 2)

2002: Henry Omaga-Diaz (TV Patrol /ABS-CBN 2)

2003: Julius Babao (TV Patrol / ABS-CBN 2)

2004: Julius Babao (TV Patrol / ABS-CBN 2) and Martin Andanar (Big News / ABC 5) [tied]

2005: Julius Babao (TV Patrol World / ABS-CBN 2)

2006: Julius Babao (TV Patrol World / ABS-CBN 2)

2007: Julius Babao (TV Patrol World / ABS-CBN 2) and Alex Santos (TV Patrol Sabado and TV Patrol Linggo / ABS-CBN 2) [tied]

2008: Julius Babao (TV Patrol World / ABS-CBN 2)

2009: Julius Babao (TV Patrol World / ABS-CBN 2)

2010: Julius Babao (TV Patrol World / ABS-CBN 2) and Daniel Razon (Ito Ang Balita / UNTV 37) [tied]

2011: Anthony Taberna (Iba-Balita ni Anthony Taberna / Studio 23)

2012: Ted Failon (TV Patrol 25 / ABS-CBN 2)

2013: Julius Babao (Bandila / ABS-CBN 2)

2014: Erwin Tulfo (Aksyon / TV5)

2015: Erwin Tulfo (Aksyon / TV5)

2016: Erwin Tulfo (Aksyon / TV5)

2017: Arnold Clavio (Saksi / GMA 7)

2018: Raffy Tima (Balitanghali / GMA News TV 11)

2019: Raffy Tima (Balitanghali / GMA News TV 11)

2020: Julius Babao (Bandila / ABS-CBN 2)

2021: Joee Guilas (PTV News Tonight and Ulat Bayan Weekend / PTV 4)

2023: Joee Guilas (PTV News Tonight and Ulat Bayan Weekend / PTV 4)

2024: Noli de Castro (TV Patrol / A2Z 11, All TV 2)

==== Multiple awards ====
Actor	Record Set
Julius Babao	10
Henry Omaga-Diaz	4
Mike Enriquez	4
Raffy Tima	4
Angelo Castro Jr.	4
Erwin Tulfo	3
Noli de Castro	3
Joee Guilas	2

=== Best Female Newscasters ===
1987:

1988:

1989: Helen Vela (GMA Balita / GMA 7)

1990:

1991: Helen Vela (GMA Balita / GMA 7)

1992: Loren Legarda (The World Tonight / ABS-CBN 2)

1993:

1994:

1995: Loren Legarda (The World Tonight / ABS-CBN 2)

1996:

1997:

1998: Karen Davila (Saksi / GMA 7) and Vicky Morales (GMA Network News / GMA 7) [tied]

1999:

2000: Mel Tiangco (Frontpage: Ulat ni Mel Tinagco / GMA 7)

2001: Mel Tiangco (Frontpage: Ulat ni Mel Tiangco / GMA 7)

2002: Mel Tiangco (Frontpage: Ulat ni Mel Tiagco / GMA 7) and Korina Sanchez (TV Patrol/ABS-CBN 2) [tied]

2003: Korina Sanchez (TV Patrol / ABS-CBN 2)

2004: Korina Sanchez (TV Patrol / ABS-CBN 2)

2005: Vicky Morales (Saksi: Liga ng Katotohanan / GMA-7)

2006: Vicky Morales (Saksi: Liga ng Katotohanan / GMA-7)

2007: Mel Tiangco (24 Oras / GMA 7)

2008: Vicky Morales (Saksi: Liga ng Katotohanan / GMA-7)

2009: Vicky Morales (Saksi: Liga Ng Katotohanan / GMA-7)

2010: Karen Davila (TV Patrol World / ABS-CBN 2)

2011: Vicky Morales (Saksi / GMA-7)

2012: Vicky Morales (Saksi / GMA-7)

2013: Karen Davila (Bandila / ABS-CBN 2)

2014: Jessica Soho (State of the Nation with Jessica Soho / GMA News TV)

2015: Jessica Soho (State of the Nation with Jessica Soho / GMA News TV)

2016: Vicky Morales (24 Oras / GMA-7)

2017: Bernadette Sembrano (TV Patrol / ABS-CBN 2)

2018: Bernadette Sembrano (TV Patrol / ABS-CBN 2)

2019: Vicky Morales (24 Oras / GMA-7)

2020: Vicky Morales (24 Oras / GMA-7)

2021: Vicky Morales (24 Oras / GMA-7)

2023: Karen Davila (TV Patrol / A2Z 11)

2024: Korina Sanchez (Agenda / Bilyonaryo News Channel)
