= Pantawid ng Pag-ibig: At Home Together Concert =

2020 Philippine benefit concert

- Genre: Benefit concert television special
- Presented by: Alvin Elchico; Zen Hernandez
- Starring: ABS-CBN artists
- Country of origin: Philippines
- Original languages: Filipino; English

Production
- Production locations: Studio 7, ABS-CBN Broadcasting Center, Diliman, Quezon City (hosts); House (ABS-CBN artists)
- Running time: 360 minutes

Original release
- Network: ABS-CBN
- Release: March 22, 2020

Pantawid ng Pag-ibig: At Home Together Concert (lit. transl. Bridge of Love) is a six-hour Philippine benefit concert television special held on March 22, 2020, in support of ABS-CBN Foundation's efforts in helping those heavily affected by the 2020 Luzon enhanced community quarantine caused by the COVID-19 pandemic in the Philippines. Hosted by TV Patrol Weekend news anchors Alvin Elchico and Zen Hernandez, the virtual concert featured musical performances and appearances by talents from ABS-CBN, appearing from their respective homes. The special aired on ABS-CBN and several of its sister broadcast and cable channels, radio stations, and digital streaming platforms. The special was also aired on other stations that are members of the Kapisanan ng mga Brodkaster ng Pilipinas.

Towards the end of the show, it was announced that the concert has raised nearly ₱237 million in pledges and donations.

== Performances ==
Artist(s)	Song(s)
Martin Nievera	"I'll Be There"
Gary Valenciano	"Natutulog Ba Ang Diyos?"
Regine Velasquez; Ogie Alcasid	"Araw Gabi"
Liza Soberano; Enrique Gil	"Baby I'm-a Want You" "Everything I Own" "Make It With You"
Toni Gonzaga	"Still"
Jona Viray	"Paano Kita Pasasalamatan"
Sarah Geronimo; Matteo Guidicelli	"You Are the Reason"
Lea Salonga	"Somewhere Over the Rainbow"
Bamboo Mañalac	"Ikot Ng Mundo" "Noypi"
Apl.de.ap	"Sa Aming Bayan"
Yam Concepcion	"Stand by Me"
Billy Crawford	"We Will Rise"
Rey Valera	"Malayo Pa Ang Umaga"
Vice Ganda	"Corona Ba-Bye Na!"
Birit Queens; Jona Viray; Klarisse de Guzman; Angeline Quinto; Morissette	"Stand Up for Love"
Jericho Rosales; Sam Milby	"I Won't Give Up"
Karylle; Teddy Corpuz; Jugs Jugueta	"Pabuhat" "Kapit Lang"
Lani Misalucha	"Bridge over Troubled Water"
Angeline Quinto	"Narito"
Moira Dela Torre; Jason Marvin	"Forever Safe"
Zsa Zsa Padilla	"Only Hope"
Erik Santos	"May Bukas Pa"
Karla Estrada; Jolina Magdangal	"Kung Kailangan Mo Ako"
Paulo Avelino	"With a Smile"
Xian Lim	"Man in the Mirror"
Carlo Aquino; JM de Guzman	"Liwanag Sa Dilim"
Darren Espanto	"Rise Up"
Jason Dy	"Stay with Me"
Iñigo Pascual	"Dahil Sa'yo"
Yeng Constantino	"Healer"
Jed Madela; Nyoy Volante	"His Eye Is on the Sparrow"
Regine Velasquez; Ogie Alcasid	"The Lord Is My Savior"
Sharon Cuneta	"Both Sides, Now"
Sarah Geronimo	"The Greatest Love of All"
All of the Kapamilya stars	"Heal the World"

== Appearances ==
- Agot Isidro
- Alex Gonzaga*
- Amy Perez
- Angel Aquino
- Angel Locsin
- Angelica Panganiban
- Anne Curtis
- Anthony Taberna
- Arci Muñoz
- Arjo Atayde
- Bea Alonzo
- Beauty Gonzalez
- Bernadette Sembrano
- Boy Abunda
- Charo Santos-Concio
- Cherry Pie Picache
- Chiara Zambrano
- Coco Martin
- Daniel Padilla
- Dimples Romana
- Donny Pangilinan
- Edu Manzano
- Edward Barber
- Elisse Joson
- Enchong Dee
- Eula Valdez
- Gerald Anderson
- Isabel Oli
- Ivana Alawi*
- Jane De Leon
- Jane Oineza
- Janella Salvador
- Jhong Hilario
- Jodi Sta. Maria
- John Arcilla
- John Prats
- Jorge Cariño
- Judy Ann Santos
- Julia Barretto
- Julia Montes
- Julius Babao
- Karen Davila
- Kathryn Bernardo
- Kim Atienza
- Kim Chiu*
- Korina Sanchez
- Lorna Tolentino
- Luis Manzano
- Maja Salvador
- Marco Gumabao
- Maricel Soriano
- Maymay Entrata
- Melai Cantiveros*
- Nadine Lustre
- Noli de Castro
- Pia Wurtzbach
- Piolo Pascual
- Pokwang*
- Ria Atayde
- RK Bagatsing
- Robi Domingo
- Rowell Santiago
- Ruffa Gutierrez
- Ryan Bang
- Sylvia Sanchez
- Ted Failon
- The Gold Squad (Francine Diaz, Andrea Brillantes, Kyle Echarri, and Seth Fedelin)*
- Tony Labrusca
- Vhong Navarro
- Vina Morales
- Vivoree Esclito
- Yassi Pressman

* made vlogs that were broadcast during the event.

== Broadcast ==
The special was broadcast on Sunday, March 22, 2020, at 7pm on ABS-CBN and was simulcast on the network's sister television networks such as S+A, ANC, DZMM TeleRadyo, Jeepney TV, Myx, Metro Channel, and Asianovela Channel. It was also broadcast on radio via DZMM Radyo Patrol 630 and MOR Philippines. Internationally, the special was broadcast on The Filipino Channel. It was also streamed live on iWant and on ABS-CBN's official Facebook and YouTube accounts. The special was also aired on other stations like K-Lite 103.5 (now All Radio 103.5) owned by Advanced Media Broadcasting System Inc, Magic 89.9 owned by Quest Broadcasting Inc, Neo Retro 105.9 (now 105.9 True FM) owned by Bright Star Broadcasting Network Corporation, Q Radio 105.1 (now 105.1 Brigada News FM Manila) owned by Mareco Broadcasting Network Inc, Monster RX 93.1 owned by Audiovisual Communicators Inc, DZRH owned by Manila Broadcasting Company, DWBL owned by FBS Radio Network, and Now Radio 1098 AM owned by Crusaders Broadcasting System.
