= List of accolades received by 24 Oras =

24 Oras accolades
Awards and nominations
Award	Wins	Nominations
Ani ng Dangal Awards	1	1
Asian Academy Creative Awards	1	8
Asian Television Awards	2	4
Box Office Entertainment Awards	5	5
Catholic Mass Media Awards	7	7
Gawad Tanglaw	3	3
Golden Nymph Awards	0	1
Golden Screen TV Awards	1	8
International Emmy Awards Current Affairs & News	0	1
New York Festivals TV & Film Awards	2	2
Peabody Awards	1	1
PMPC Star Awards for Television	9	52

Totals (Note: Certain award groups do not simply award one winner. They acknowledge several different recipients, have runners-up, and have third place. Since this is a specific recognition and is different from losing an award, runner-up mentions are considered wins in this award tally. For simplification and to avoid errors, each award in this list has been presumed to have had a prior nomination.)
- Wins: 32
- Nominations: 93

24 Oras is a Philippine television newscast that premiered on GMA Network on March 15, 2004. It focuses on reportage of present-day events, incorporating disparate segments that appear recurringly. (Note: Each segment has a unique topic, such as entertainment or weather.) 24 Oras initially featured Mel Tiangco and Mike Enriquez; the newscast's anchors have changed significantly during its run.

Since its premiere, 24 Oras has been widely recognized as one of the network's most-trusted newscasts. It has enjoyed consistently high viewership on broadcast television, according to AGB Nielsen Philippines and Kantar Media Philippines. 24 Oras has had a significant impact on social media and television as a result of the COVID-19 pandemic, expanding its broadcast in the Paschal Triduum as well as livestreaming to worldwide and TikTok, the first newscast to do so.

24 Oras has garnered awards and nominations in various categories. It has won five Box Office Entertainment Awards for Most Popular TV Program News & Public Affairs. The newscast has received eight Asian Academy Creative Award nominations (winning one) and fifty-two for PMPC Star Awards for Television (winning nine). At the 2009 New York Festivals TV & Film Awards, 24 Oras garnered a Gold World Medal and a Silver World Medal. It was nominated for International Emmy Award for Best News in 2013 and received a Peabody Award in 2014.

== Accolades ==
Accolades received by 24 Oras
Award	Year (Note: Indicates the year of ceremony. Each year is linked to the article about the awards held that year, wherever possible.)	Category	Recipient(s)	Result	Ref.
Ani ng Dangal Awards	2010	Honoree	24 Oras	Won	
Asian Academy Creative Awards (Note: Covers non-web-only entities and excludes national winners.)	2018	Best Single News Story	"Exclusive Report on the Rescue of Hostages in Marawi"	Nominated	
Asian Academy Creative Awards	2019	Best News Programme	"Mid-term Elections Coverage"	Nominated	
Asian Academy Creative Awards	2020	Best News or Current Affairs Presenter/Anchor	Jessica Soho	Nominated	
Asian Academy Creative Awards	2020	Best Single News Story	"Walking in EDSA Traversing a major thoroughfare on foot"	Nominated	
Asian Academy Creative Awards	2021	Best News Programme	Typhoon Vamco special coverage	Won	
Asian Academy Creative Awards	2021	Best Single News Story	"Typhoon Vamco Marikina Rescue"	Nominated	
Asian Academy Creative Awards	2023	Best Documentary Series	"Climate Change"	Nominated	
Asian Academy Creative Awards	2023	Best News/Current Affairs Programme or Series	"TS Egay Coverage"	Nominated	
Asian Television Awards	2005	Best News Program	"Camp Bagong Diwa Siege"	Highly commended	
Asian Television Awards	2007	Best News Program	Coverage of Typhoon Milenyo	Nominated	
Asian Television Awards	2010	Best News Program	Coverage of the Maguindanao massacre	Highly commended	
Asian Television Awards	2013	Best News Program	"Typhoon Pablo"	Nominated	
Box Office Entertainment Awards	2011	Most Popular TV Programs (News Program)	24 Oras	Won	
Box Office Entertainment Awards	2012	Most Popular TV Program News & Public Affairs	24 Oras	Won	
Box Office Entertainment Awards	2013	Most Popular TV Program News & Public Affairs	24 Oras	Won	
Box Office Entertainment Awards	2017	Most Popular TV Program News & Public Affairs	24 Oras	Won	
Box Office Entertainment Awards	2020	Most Popular TV Program News & Public Affairs	24 Oras	Won	
Catholic Mass Media Awards	2006	Best News Program	24 Oras	Won	
Catholic Mass Media Awards	2007	Best News Program	24 Oras	Won	
Catholic Mass Media Awards	2010	Best News Program (Special Citation)	24 Oras	Won (Note: Tied with Balitang Bisdak.)	
Catholic Mass Media Awards	2011	Best News Program	24 Oras	Won	
Catholic Mass Media Awards	2012	Hall of Fame for Best News Program	24 Oras	Won	
Catholic Mass Media Awards	2022	Best Special Event Coverage	Super Typhoon Odette special coverage	Won	
Catholic Mass Media Awards	2023	Best Special Event Coverage	"May 9, 2022 Election Coverage"	Won	
Gawad Tanglaw	2009	Best News Program	24 Oras	Won (Note: Tied with TV Patrol.)	
Gawad Tanglaw	2011	Best News Program	24 Oras	Won	
Gawad Tanglaw	2012	Best News Program	24 Oras	Won	
Golden Nymph Awards	2019	News	GMA Network for Emil Sumangil's report on "Justiis: Condominium Behind Bars"	Nominated	
Golden Screen TV Awards	2011	Outstanding News Program	24 Oras	Won	
Golden Screen TV Awards	2013	Outstanding News Program	24 Oras	Nominated	
Golden Screen TV Awards	2013	Outstanding Female News Presenter	Mel Tiangco	Nominated	
Golden Screen TV Awards	2014	Outstanding News Program	24 Oras	Nominated	
Golden Screen TV Awards	2014	Outstanding Female News Presenter	Mel Tiangco	Nominated	
Golden Screen TV Awards	2015	Outstanding News Program	24 Oras	Nominated	
Golden Screen TV Awards	2015	Outstanding Female News Presenter	Mel Tiangco	Nominated	
Golden Screen TV Awards	2015	Outstanding Female News Presenter	Vicky Morales	Nominated	
International Emmy Awards Current Affairs & News	2013	Best News	"Typhoon Pablo"	Nominated	
New York Festivals TV & Film Awards	2009	Coverage of an Ongoing Story	Jiggy Manicad's report on "Corporal Abeto"	Gold	
New York Festivals TV & Film Awards	2009	Best Newscast	Coverage of Lanao del Norte attacks	Silver	
Peabody Awards	2014	Honoree	GMA Network for "Coverage of Supertyphoon Yolanda (Haiyan)"	Won (Note: Tied with 24 Oras Weekend, Saksi, State of the Nation, and Kapuso Mo, Jessica Soho.)	
PMPC Star Awards for Television	2005	Best News Program	24 Oras	Nominated	
PMPC Star Awards for Television	2005	Best Female Newscaster	Mel Tiangco	Nominated	
PMPC Star Awards for Television	2005	Best Male Newscaster	Mike Enriquez	Nominated	
PMPC Star Awards for Television	2006	Best News Program	24 Oras	Won	
PMPC Star Awards for Television	2007	Best News Program	24 Oras	Nominated	
PMPC Star Awards for Television	2007	Best Female Newscaster	Mel Tiangco	Won	
PMPC Star Awards for Television	2007	Best Male Newscaster	Mike Enriquez	Nominated	
PMPC Star Awards for Television	2008	Best News Program	24 Oras	Nominated	
PMPC Star Awards for Television	2008	Best Female Newscaster	Mel Tiangco	Nominated	
PMPC Star Awards for Television	2008	Best Male Newscaster	Mike Enriquez	Nominated	
PMPC Star Awards for Television	2009	Best News Program	24 Oras	Nominated	
PMPC Star Awards for Television	2009	Best Male Newscaster	Mike Enriquez	Nominated	
PMPC Star Awards for Television	2010	Best News Program	24 Oras	Nominated	
PMPC Star Awards for Television	2010	Best Female Newscaster	Mel Tiangco	Nominated	
PMPC Star Awards for Television	2010	Best Male Newscaster	Mike Enriquez	Nominated	
PMPC Star Awards for Television	2011	Best News Program	24 Oras	Won	
PMPC Star Awards for Television	2011	Best Female Newscaster	Mel Tiangco	Nominated	
PMPC Star Awards for Television	2011	Best Male Newscaster	Mike Enriquez	Nominated	
PMPC Star Awards for Television	2012	Best News Program	24 Oras	Nominated	
PMPC Star Awards for Television	2012	Best Female Newscaster	Mel Tiangco	Nominated	
PMPC Star Awards for Television	2012	Best Male Newscaster	Mike Enriquez	Nominated	
PMPC Star Awards for Television	2013	Best News Program	24 Oras	Nominated	
PMPC Star Awards for Television	2013	Best Female Newscaster	Mel Tiangco	Nominated	
PMPC Star Awards for Television	2013	Best Male Newscaster	Mike Enriquez	Nominated	
PMPC Star Awards for Television	2014	Best News Program	24 Oras	Nominated	
PMPC Star Awards for Television	2014	Best Female Newscaster	Mel Tiangco	Nominated	
PMPC Star Awards for Television	2014	Best Male Newscaster	Mike Enriquez	Nominated	
PMPC Star Awards for Television	2015	Best News Program	24 Oras	Nominated	
PMPC Star Awards for Television	2015	Best Female Newscaster	Mel Tiangco	Nominated	
PMPC Star Awards for Television	2015	Best Male Newscaster	Mike Enriquez	Nominated	
PMPC Star Awards for Television	2016	Best News Program	24 Oras	Won	
PMPC Star Awards for Television	2016	Best Female Newscaster	Mel Tiangco	Nominated	
PMPC Star Awards for Television	2016	Best Female Newscaster	Vicky Morales	Won	
PMPC Star Awards for Television	2016	Best Male Newscaster	Mike Enriquez	Nominated	
PMPC Star Awards for Television	2017	Best News Program	24 Oras	Nominated	
PMPC Star Awards for Television	2017	Best Female Newscaster	Mel Tiangco	Nominated	
PMPC Star Awards for Television	2017	Best Female Newscaster	Vicky Morales	Nominated	
PMPC Star Awards for Television	2017	Best Male Newscaster	Mike Enriquez	Nominated	
PMPC Star Awards for Television	2018	Best News Program	24 Oras	Nominated	
PMPC Star Awards for Television	2018	Best Female Newscaster	Mel Tiangco	Nominated	
PMPC Star Awards for Television	2018	Best Female Newscaster	Vicky Morales	Nominated	
PMPC Star Awards for Television	2018	Best Male Newscaster	Mike Enriquez	Nominated	
PMPC Star Awards for Television	2019	Best News Program	24 Oras	Nominated	
PMPC Star Awards for Television	2019	Best Female Newscaster	Mel Tiangco	Nominated	
PMPC Star Awards for Television	2019	Best Female Newscaster	Vicky Morales	Won	
PMPC Star Awards for Television	2019	Best Male Newscaster	Mike Enriquez	Nominated	
PMPC Star Awards for Television	2021	Best News Program	24 Oras	Nominated	
PMPC Star Awards for Television	2021	Best Female Newscaster	Mel Tiangco	Nominated	
PMPC Star Awards for Television	2021	Best Female Newscaster	Vicky Morales	Won	
PMPC Star Awards for Television	2021	Best Male Newscaster	Mike Enriquez	Nominated	
PMPC Star Awards for Television	2023	Best News Program	24 Oras	Won	
PMPC Star Awards for Television	2023	Best Female Newscaster	Vicky Morales	Won	
