= Julius Babao =

Filipino journalist, radio commentator and host (born 1968)

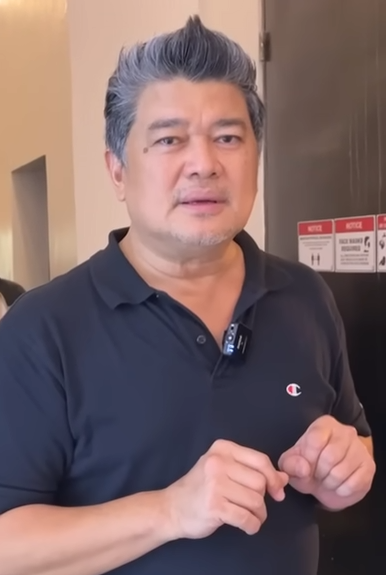
- Babao in 2023
- Born: Julius Caesar Concepcion Babao; July 15, 1968 (age 58); Dagupan, Pangasinan, Philippines
- Education: University of the Philippines Diliman
- Occupations: Journalist; Radio Commentator
- Years active: 1990–present
- Employers: GMA Network (1990–1993); ABS-CBN (1993–2022); TV5 (2022–present)
- Spouse: Christine Bersola (m. 2003)
- Children: 2

YouTube information
- Channel: Julius Babao UNPLUGGED
- Years active: 2013–present
- Genres: vlogs, game show, talk show
- Subscribers: 2 Million
- Views: 502 Million
- Last updated: 4 August 2026

Julius Caesar Concepcion Babao (Tagalog: [ˈdʒuljus ˈbabaʊ], born July 15, 1968) is a Filipino broadcast journalist, radio commentator and former talk show host for the Philippine television stations ABS-CBN and TV5. He is most notable for anchoring TV Patrol from 2003 to 2010, Bandila from 2010 to 2020, and currently Frontline Pilipinas since 2022.

== Career ==
Babao started out his career as a production assistant in GMA Network's DZBB-AM in 1990.

Through hard work and perseverance, Babao was soon promoted as a radio reporter and a contributor for GMA News. In 1993, Babao left GMA for ABS-CBN where he worked as a television reporter for TV Patrol. From 1993 to early 1996, he was tapped by the management of ABS-CBN News to be a standby anchor for either Noli de Castro or Frankie Evangelista in TV Patrol.

In 1996, Babao was given his own show Alas Singko Y Medya which he hosted with his future wife Christine Bersola-Babao until 2001.

The couple then went on to host a daily morning talk-show called Talk TV, which lasted from 2001 to 2002.

In April 2003, Babao transitioned into the weekday edition of the station's flagship news program TV Patrol and joined Korina Sanchez as its anchors. Sanchez was later replaced by Karen Davila and Ted Failon in November 2004, when the newscast was relaunched as TV Patrol World.

In 2004, he and his wife launched a morning radio program for DZMM entitled Magandang Morning with Julius and Tintin. Their morning radio program would be combined with Radyo Patrol Balita: Alas Siyete, the newscast they are anchoring every weekend, similar to Kabayan. In 2006, he was appointed as one of the hosts of public-affairs program XXX: Exklusibong, Explosibong, Exposé, where they investigate anomalies and irregularities of public and private practices in the Philippines, he normally joins the field and/or entrapment operations conducted by the law enforcement agencies.

Babao left TV Patrol alongside Karen Davila on November 5, 2010 to anchor the late evening newscast, Bandila on November 22 of that year, with Ces Oreña-Drilon, replacing Henry Omaga-Diaz who returned to field report. He was replaced by Noli de Castro and the latter being replaced by Korina Sanchez as they joined Ted Failon on November 8, 2010. He silently left the former a few days before the said date due to a vacation leave.

On January 10, 2011, he anchored Aksyon Ngayon with Kaye Dacer and Radyo Patrol Balita: Alas-Dose, both airing every weekdays.

On January 2, 2017, Babao hosted the new daily radio show, Lingkod Kapamilya, replacing Aksyon Ngayon, with Bernadette Sembrano and continued to anchor the daily newscast Radyo Patrol Balita: Alas-Dose on DZMM before it got merged with Headline Pilipinas in July 2019, where he joined Tony Velasquez as the main anchor. He is also the weekend anchor of TeleRadyo's newscast TeleRadyo Balita Weekend (formerly Radyo Patrol Balita: Alas-Siyete Weekend) alongside Zen Hernandez.

He also hosted Mission Possible, an award-winning advocacy show which airs every Monday evenings and Saturday mornings.

On September 7, 2020, he returned to TV Patrol as an occasional replacement for Ted Failon after the latter's departure and later as a relief anchor for Noli de Castro and Henry Omaga-Diaz on the weekday edition and on the weekend edition for Alvin Elchico.

Babao left ABS-CBN on December 31, 2021, after 28 years with the television giant network, as part of its retrenchment program caused by the ABS-CBN shutdown from the Philippine Congress that junked the new ABS-CBN legislative franchise to operate. He made his final appearance on TV Patrol as a relief anchor and two days later on TeleRadyo Balita Weekend.

In January 2022, Babao joined TV5 to anchor the network's primetime newscast Frontline Pilipinas starting February 7, 2022, replacing then-senatorial candidate Raffy Tulfo. On March 21, 2022, Julius & Tintin: Para Sa Pamilyang Pilipino, which he hosts alongside his wife, debuted on Radyo5 92.3 News FM and One PH. On September 22, 2024, his program, Julius Babao Unplugged debuted on television via TV5.

== Controversies ==
=== Alleged terrorist link ===
In October 2005, news surfaced where Julius Babao was allegedly linked to a suspected terrorist named Tyrone del Rosario Santos. (alias: Dawud Santos). Columnist Ramon Tulfo's column in the Philippine Daily Inquirer brought the matter to public attention, quoting President Gloria Macapagal Arroyo as saying military intelligence pointed to Babao posting bail for Dawud. While Babao and his then-employer ABS-CBN denied the accusation, Tulfo later corrected his column to say Babao only acted as a guarantor for Dawud's bail bond, an act the author of the document believed was no different from posting bail. This created a conflict of credibility between Babao and Tulfo.

=== Discaya interview ===
Babao became controversial for his September 2024 interview with Curlee and Sarah Discaya, who described their family's "rags-to-riches" stories on Julius Babao Unplugged. The couple were later implicated in the anomalous "ghost" flood control projects, raising questions on journalism ethics. Pasig Mayor Vico Sotto, Discaya's 2025 election rival, claimed that Babao and another interviewer, Korina Sanchez, were paid ₱10 million for the feature; both journalists denied his allegation. Babao also underscored that his interview with the Discaya couple are not a news report but a lifestyle feature and politics was not raised at the time during the feature's production. He later went on leave from Frontline Pilipinas beginning on August 25, 2025.

== Personal life ==
Babao is a graduate of Mass Communications, majoring in film and audio visual communication, from the University of the Philippines Diliman. He is married to his former co-host Christine Bersola. They have a daughter named Antonia Julia Sofia (also known as Anya, b. 2005) and a son named Antonio Francesco (b. 2010).

The couple has also raised Siberian Huskies namely Snow, Krystal, Kirby and Kamatz, to name a few.

Julius and Christine are also avid art collectors where their collection was mostly bought from the Boston Gallery owned by Dr. Joven Cuanang. In July 2008 at the advent of Julius’ 40th birthday, the couple auctioned-off paintings from 125 participating artists at the Pinto Art Gallery, the proceeds went to the development of the Art 40 Village located in Bagong Silang, Caloocan.

He is also a Hypebeast item collector, Streetwear collector (particularly those made by the brand Supreme) as well as a sneakerhead and he even has a YouTube channel dedicated to such lifestyle.

== Awards ==
Julius Babao was awarded best male newscaster in the 2008 PMPC Star Awards for TV, he also won again in 2009 from the same award-giving body, he also won best morning show host in the years 1999 and 2000 respectively from the same award-giving body. In 2008, Babao was also presented the student's choice of male news and public affairs host at the USTv Student's Choice Awards and he was also honoured as one of the most admired male TV Personalities for the 2008 Anak TV Seal, an award given annually by the Southeast Asian Foundation for Children and Television to kid-friendly TV programs and personalities considered to be good influence on children. He was also a two time awardee of Most Outstanding Male News Presenter (2007 and 2009) of COMGUILD Center for Journalism.

Year	Award giving body	Category	Nominated work	Results	Ref.
1999	PMPC Star Awards for TV	Best Morning Show Host	—N/a	Won	
2000	PMPC Star Awards for TV	Best Morning Show Host	Alas Singko Y Medya	Won	
2008	Anak TV Seal Awards	Most Admired Male TV Personalities	—N/a	Won	
2008	PMPC Star Awards for TV	Best Male Newscaster	—N/a	Won	
2008	USTv Student's Choice Awards	Male News and Public Affairs Host	—N/a	Won	
2007	COMGUILD Center for Journalism	Most Outstanding Male News Presenter	—N/a	Won	
2009	COMGUILD Center for Journalism	Most Outstanding Male News Presenter	—N/a	Won	
2009	PMPC Star Awards for TV	Best Male Newscaster	—N/a	Won	
2014	Golden Screen TV Awards	Outstanding Male News Presenter	—N/a	Won	
