= Amado Pineda =

Filipino meteorologist (1938–2015)

- Born: May 5, 1938; Commonwealth of the Philippines
- Died: August 6, 2015 (aged 77); Pasig, Metro Manila, Philippines
- Occupations: Meteorologist, weather presenter
- Years active: 1976–1996

Amado Pineda (May 5, 1938 – August 6, 2015) was a Filipino meteorologist who became the first television weather presenter in the Philippines.

A meteorologist with the Philippine Atmospheric, Geophysical and Astronomical Services Administration (PAGASA), Pineda worked for GMA Network's news department as the network's first weather presenter for News at Seven in 1976. He was succeeded in 1996 by Rey Pacheco for GMA Balita and Saksi and when GMA Headline News ended in 1992, Marga Ortigas for GMA Network News (the first female television weather presenter in the Philippines until 1996).

While hardly trained as a television presenter, Pineda became popular, being the only television weather presenter during the 1970s to the 1990s; for catchphrases like, "'Yan ang pinakahuling ulat mula sa PAGASA" ("That's the latest from PAGASA") at the end of his forecasts and "Kaya mga bata, may pasok bukas" ("And so children, there are classes tomorrow") for weather reports of weaker-than-expected tropical storms and/or typhoons.

Pineda made several cameo appearances in films, in roles mostly spoofing himself. The comedian Tessie Tomas also gained renown with her own spoof of Pineda appearing on Radio Philippines Network (RPN) sketch comedy show Champoy with her character named Amanda Pineda.

Pineda later headed Weathernews Philippines, Inc., a commercial weather bureau. He died on August 6, 2015, in Pasig at the age of 77 due to complications associated with the chronic obstructive pulmonary disease and hypertension.

== Filmography ==
=== Television ===
Year	Title
1976–1986	News at Seven
1986–1992	GMA Headline News
1986–1995	GMA Balita
1995–1996	Saksi
