= Marc Logan (broadcast journalist) =

Filipino broadcast journalist (born 1966)

- Born: Marcelo Logan Ponti Jr. January 31, 1968 (age 58); Baguio City, Benguet Province, Philippines
- Education: Polytechnic University of the Philippines
- Occupations: Broadcast journalist, radio commentator, columnist, actor, comedian
- Years active: 1996–present
- Employers: ABS-CBN Corporation (1996–2024); TV5 Network, Inc. (2024–present); Intercontinental Broadcasting Corporation (2024–2025)
- Notable credits: TV Patrol – segment reporter (1996–2024); Mga Kwento ni Marc Logan – host (2014–2017); Top 5: Mga Kwentong Marc Logan – host (2024–present)

YouTube information
- Channel: MARC LOGAN
- Years active: 2021–present
- Genres: Comedy, magazine, vlogs
- Subscribers: 8 thousand
- Views: 800 thousand
- Last updated: October 9, 2024

Marcelo "Marc" Logan Ponti Jr. (born January 31, 1968 in Baguio City), also known as Kaka Marc, is a Filipino broadcast journalist, TV host, actor, comedian, and radio commentator who specializes in satirical and comical infotainment. He is popularly known for his tongue-in-cheek reporting and comedic voice overs. He is also active in social media and tabloids providing infotainment.

== Career ==
In 1996, Logan was hired as a desk editor by ABS-CBN. He then moved on to read humorous trivial segments and features on TV Patrol, the flagship national network news broadcast of the ABS-CBN station. Logan introduced the concept of "infotainment," information combined with entertainment news. He hosted and produced the program Mga Kwento ni Marc Logan (lit. 'Stories by Marc Logan'), a weekly entertainment show that features humorous videos collected from social media posts. Logan previously hosted a show with the same concept titled Vid-Joking. His segment on TV Patrol is also named "Mga Kwento ni Marc Logan" and previously was "Meron Akong Kwento" (lit. 'I have a Story').

In January 2023, Logan took an optional retirement from ABS-CBN but continued to appear on TV Patrol until he silently left the said newscast on February 2, 2024. After his retirement, he became a full-time producer of his travel show, Tribu Katuga (Kain Tulog Gala), and built his production company, Logan's Run Entertainment Production, where he is the president and CEO. He is also serves as a creative consultant and station manager for the IBC's AM radio station DWAN-AM.

On February 5, 2024, Logan joined Abante's social media news channel Abante TeleTabloid as one of its program anchors. He also leads the channel's flagship newscast.

On March 8, 2024, Logan signed with TV5 Network Inc. He would then become the host of Top 5: Mga Kwentong Marc Logan, airing on TV5 and RPTV.

On July 1, 2024, Logan debuted his new radio programs, KaLogan and ReFOODlika na sa Pilipinas on DWAN-AM, marking his return to AM radio after four years until 2025.

== Personal life ==
Logan is the fifth in a family with six children. In 2023, Logan married Eloisa Diego, his partner for nearly two decades with whom he shared two children. According to ABS-CBN News, the two have been married since December 2003, before hosting a church wedding in 2023.

== Filmography ==
=== Television ===
- Wansapanataym – King-King (Episode: Dondee, da Duwende)
- Mga Kwento ni Marc Logan
- Showtime – guest celebrity judge
- TV Patrol
- Bandila
- Matanglawin – guest co-host
- Rated K
- Pinoy Big Brother
- Gandang Gabi Vice – guest
- Tonight with Boy Abunda
- Abante TeleTabloid (Abante)
- Top 5: Mga Kwentong Marc Logan

=== Films ===
- Ayuda Babes as Marc Logan (Himself)

== Radio ==
- Logan Live (2012–2013)
- Sakto (2014–2018)
- Lima at Logan: Tandem! (2018–2020)
- ReFOODlika na sa Pilipinas (2024–2025)
- KaLogan (2024–2025)
