= International Emmy Awards Current Affairs & News =

- Promotional poster.
- Awarded for: Excellence in international news coverage
- Country: United States
- Presented by: International Academy of Television Arts & Sciences
- First award: 1999 / 2007
- Website: www.iemmys.tv

The International Emmy Awards for Current Affairs & News presented by the International Academy of Television Arts & Sciences (IATAS) recognizes excellence in international journalistic coverage produced and broadcast outside the United States.

The journalism awards in the international categories are presented alongside their American news and documentary counterparts as part of the National Academy of Television Arts & Sciences' News and Documentary Emmys.

== History ==
The International Emmy for News was first presented in 1999 for the episode "A Witness to Murder" of the UK's Channel 4 program Dispatches. The following year, ITN won the same category for its news coverage of Mozambique's 2000 floods. The award was not presented in 2001.

In 2002, BBC News won for its coverage of the takeover of Kabul by Northern Alliance troops during the Afghan War. That same year, TV Globo's Jornal Nacional received its first nomination in the category, for the editions on September 11, 2001 and for the six days following the terrorist attacks on the twin towers of the World Trade Center.

Channel 4 News won in 2003 with its coverage of Saddam's fall, the episode is a reference to the toppling of the dictator's statue in Baghdad. The explosions in Madrid gave the British channel victory the following year.

In 2005, the Associated Press news channel and the Netherlands' NCRV TV network shared the prize. The tie was repeated the following year, with Sky News winning the category for its coverage of the July 7 attacks in London, and television stations NOVA, NPS, VARA from the Netherlands with their report on the "Hunt for the Taliban".

In 2007, a new category was added to the International Emmy for News, "Baghdad: A Doctor's Story", from The Guardian in partnership with the BBC, won the Emmy for Current Affairs.

== Categories ==
- News (1999–present)
- Current Affairs (2007–present)
