= GMA Balita =

Philippine television news show

- Title card from 1986 to 1988
- Genre: News broadcasting
- Country of origin: Philippines
- Original language: Tagalog

Production
- Running time: 30–60 minutes
- Production company: GMA News and Public Affairs

Original release
- Network: GMA Network
- Release: May 19, 1986 – April 8, 1998

GMA Balita (transl. GMA news) is a Philippine television news broadcasting show broadcast by GMA Network. Originally anchored by Mike Lacanilao and Helen Vela, it premiered on May 19, 1986. In 1995, it was moved to weekday mornings and reformatted as a morning news show. Lacanilao, Veronica Baluyot, Lyn Ching, Alex Tinsay and Arnold Clavio served as the final anchors. The newscast concluded on April 8, 1998.

== Anchors ==
- Mike Lacanilao (1986–98)
- Helen Vela (1986–92)
- Rene Jose (1988–89)
- Bobby Guanzon (1989–95)
- Veronica Baluyut-Jimenez (1989–92 as substitute anchor for Vela, 1992–98 as anchor)
- Karen Davila (substitute anchor of Vela and Baluyut-Jimenez, 1994–95)
- Amado Pineda (weatherman, 1986–96)
- Lyn Ching-Pascual (showbiz and lifestyle anchor, 1994–98)
- Alex Tinsay (1995–98)
- Arnold Clavio (1995–98)
- Rey Pacheco (weatherman, 1996–98)

== Accolades ==
Accolades received by GMA Balita
Year	Award	Category	Recipient	Result	Ref.
1989	3rd PMPC Star Awards for Television	Best News Program	GMA Balita	Won	
1989	3rd PMPC Star Awards for Television	Best Male Newscaster	Bobby Guanzon	Won	
1993	7th PMPC Star Awards for Television	Best Male Newscaster	Bobby Guanzon	Won	
1994	8th PMPC Star Awards for Television	Best News Program	GMA Balita	Won	
1994	8th PMPC Star Awards for Television	Best Male Newscaster	Bobby Guanzon	Won	
