= International Emmy Award for Best News =

Award for excellence in international news coverage

- Country: United States
- Presented by: International Academy of Television Arts and Sciences
- First award: 1999
- Currently held by: Gaza, Search for Life; Qatar (2025)
- Website: www.iemmys.tv

The International Emmy Award for Best News is presented by the International Academy of Television Arts & Sciences (IATAS) to recognize the best news programming produced and initially broadcast outside the United States. The award was first presented in 1999. The categories for international journalism were previously presented at the News & Documentary Emmy Awards alongside their U.S. counterparts.

In 2025, they began to be presented at the International Emmy Awards Gala, along with the other categories.

== Winners and nominees ==
=== 1990s ===
Year	Program (English Title)	Episode/Story	Production company/Network	Country
1999	Dispatches	"A Witness to Murder"	Hardcash Productions / Channel 4	United Kingdom
1999	News 23 Special	"A Discussion with President Clinton"	Tokyo Broadcasting	Japan
1999	Kosovo: Liberation Day		Sky News	United Kingdom

=== 2000s ===
Year	Program (English Title)	Episode/Story	Production company/Network	Country
2000	The Mozambique Floods		ITN News	United Kingdom
2000	Correspondent: Inside Chechnya		BBC / Wilton Films	United Kingdom
2000	Zone Interdite	"Chile: Torturers Running Free"	Tony Comiti Productions / Metropole Television	France
2001	Not awarded			
2002	BBC News at Ten	"Fall of Kabul"	BBC News	United Kingdom
2002	Jornal Nacional	"September 11"	TV Globo	Brazil
2002	ITN for ITV	"Attack on America"	ITN Production	United Kingdom
2002	RTL aktuell	"Terror Against America"	RTL Television	Germany
2003	Channel 4 News	"The Fall of Sadam"	Channel 4	United Kingdom
2003	Looting at Baghdad Museum		France 2	France
2003	Gulf War II		AP Television	United Kingdom
2003	Radioactive Ammunitions: Deployed Again Despite Scientists' Warnings		ARD / Westdeutscher Rundfunk	Germany
2004	Channel 4 News	"The Madrid Bombing"	Channel 4	United Kingdom
2004	Good Morning Japan	"Eclipse in the Antarctic"	NHK	Japan
2004	News 7	"Terrorist Bombing of UN Headquarters in Iraq"	NHK	Japan
2004	Sky News	"Liberia"	Sky News	United Kingdom
2005	Return to Belsan		NCRV	Netherlands
2005	ITV News	"Beslan siege"	Associated Press Television News	United Kingdom
2005	Jornal Nacional	"Re-election of George W. Bush"	Rede Globo	Brazil
2005	ITV News	"Tsunami: Seven Days that Shook the World"	Associated Press Television News	United Kingdom
2006	Hunting for Taliban		NPS / VARA Television	Netherlands
2006	Sky News	"London Bombings July 7, 2005"	Sky News	United Kingdom
2006	Summit of the Americas		Artear / El Trece	Argentina
2006	BBC News 24	"London Bombings July 7, 2005"	BBC News	United Kingdom
2006	The First Mehlis Report on Hariri's Murder		Al Arabiya	United Arab Emirates
2007	BBC News	"Lebanon Crisis"	BBC News	United Kingdom
2007	Bandila	"The Subic Rape Case Promulgation"	ABS-CBN	Philippines
2007	Pro TV News	"Tibetans at the Chinese Border"	Pro TV	Romania
2007	Jornal Nacional	"Caravana JN: Elections"	Globo TV	Brazil
2008	Pro TV News	"Any Idea of What Your Kid is Doing Right Now?"	Pro TV	Romania
2008	Al Jazeera English Kuala Lumpur News Hour	"Popular Uprising in Myanmar & Military Crackdown"	Al Jazeera English	Qatar
2008	ITV News	"Zimbabwe: The Tyranny and the Tragedy"	ITV News / ITN / ITV1	United Kingdom
2008	Jornal Nacional	"TAM Accident"	TV Globo	Brazil
2009	ITV News	"China Earthquake"	ITV News	United Kingdom
2009	Al Jazeera News Hour	"Russia-Georgia War"	Al Jazeera English	Qatar
2009	Details	"South Ossetian War"	National Information Systems / INTER TV Channel	Ukraine
2009	Jornal Nacional	"Eloá's Story"	TV Globo	Brazil

=== 2010s ===
Year	Program (English Title)	Episode/Story	Production company/Network	Country
2010	Pakistan: Terrors' Front Line		Sky News	United Kingdom
2010	Al Jazeera English News Hour	"Gaza War"	Al Jazeera English	Qatar
2010	RT News	"Extended News Coverage on Obama's Visit to Russia"	RT Channel	Russia
2010	Jornal Nacional	"Blackout in Brazil"	TV Globo	Brazil
2011	Jornal Nacional	"Guerra contra as Drogas"	TV Globo	Brazil
2011	RÚV News	"Volcano Eruption at Eyjafjallajokull"	RUV Icelandic National Broadcasting Service	Iceland
2011	Sky News Live at Five	"Inside the Taliban"	Sky News	United Kingdom
2011	TV Patrol	"Manila Hostage Crisis"	ABS-CBN Broadcasting Corporation	Philippines
2012	Great East Japan Earthquake Emergency News		NHK	Japan
2012	Jornal Nacional	"Rains in the Mountain Region of Rio"	TV Globo	Brazil
2012	Newshour	"Fall of Tripoli"	Al Jazeera Network / Al Jazeera English	Qatar
2012	Occupy Wall Street: Occupy Movement		RT Channel	Russia
2013	Channel 4 News	"The Battle for Homs"	ITN / Channel 4 News	United Kingdom
2013	24 Oras	"Typhoon Pablo"	GMA Network	Philippines
2013	Jornal Nacional	"Collapse in Rio"	TV Globo	Brazil
2013	Pro TV News	"Romania Buried in Snow"	Pro TV	Romania
2014	Syria's Descent		ITV / Channel 4 News	United Kingdom
2014	Fantástico and Jornal Nacional	"Fire in a Nightclub"	TV Globo	Brazil
2014	RT News	Guantanamo Hunger Strike Coverage	RT News Channel	Russia
2014	TV Patrol Weekend	"Most Powerful Storm"	ABS-CBN	Philippines
2015	CBC News: The National	"The Ebola Effect (Ebola Outbreak in West Africa)"	Canadian Broadcasting Corporation	Canada
2015	The Buck Stops Here: "Srinagar Floods Coverage"		New Delhi Television Limited	India
2015	The National Day of Mourning		NOS Broadcasting Organization	Netherlands
2015	Jornal Hoje and Jornal Nacional	"The Death of Eduardo Campos"	TV Globo	Brazil
2016	Sky News	"Migration Crisis"	Sky News	United Kingdom
2016	Nepal Earthquake Coverage: "Nepal Earthquake and its Aftermath"		Al Jazeera English News	Qatar
2016	RT News	"UNGA: Special Coverage"	RT	Russia
2016	Jornal Nacional and Fantástico	"Microcephaly/Zika"	TV Globo	Brazil
2017	Inside Aleppo: Battle for Aleppo		Channel 4 News / ITN	United Kingdom
2017	Jornal Nacional	"The Ryan Lochte Scandal"	Globo Comunicação e Participações	Brazil
2017	Le Journal: "Paris/Jaffa: Republican National Convention, Cleveland"		i24NEWS	Israel
2017	TV Patrol	"Super Typhoon Lawin's Trail of Damage"	ABS-CBN	Philippines
2018	Sky News	"Rohingya Crisis"	Sky News	United Kingdom
2018	#MosulSOS		RT	Russia
2018	Jornal GloboNews	"Dozens Killed and Wounded in Alcacuz Prison Riot: The Collapse of Brazil's Prison System"	GloboNews / TV Globo	Brazil
2018	Newsgrid	"Qatar Crisis Special"	Al Jazeera English	Qatar
2019	Data, Democracy and Dirty Tricks: The Cambridge Analytica Scandal		ITN / Channel 4 News	United Kingdom
2019	Indonesia: Sulawesi Earthquake and Tsunami		Al Jazeera English	Qatar
2019	Jornal do Globo, Jornal Nacional and Fantástico	"The Murder of Marielle Franco"	TV Globo / GloboNews	Brazil
2019	Siberia Fire: Kemerovo Tragedy		RT	Russia

=== 2020s ===
Year	Program (English Title)	Episode/Story	Production company/Network	Country
2020	Channel 4 News	"Hong Kong: A Year of Living Dangerously"	ITN	United Kingdom
2020	RJ2	"Ghost Staff"	TV Globo	Brazil
2020	Russian Jet Crash-Landing in Moscow: Timeline and Survivors		RT International	Russia
2020	The Battle for Burkina Faso		Al Jazeera English	Qatar
2021	Sky News	"A Warning from Italy"	Sky News	United Kingdom
2021	Beirut Blast		Al Jazeera English	Qatar
2021	Jornal Nacional	"COVID-19 in Brazil"	Globo	Brazil
2021	Nagorno-Karabakh War: Bloodshed and Path to Ceasefire		RT (ANO TV-Novosti)	Russia
2022	ITV News	"Storming of the Capitol"	ITV Productions / ITV News	United Kingdom
2022	Afghanistan: Taliban Takeover		Al Jazeera English	Qatar
2022	Afghanistan Crisis News Coverage		Euronews	France
2022	Jornal Nacional	"Prevent Senior Case"	Globo	Brazil
2023	The Battle for Bucha & Irpin		Sky News	United Kingdom
2023	TV4 Nyheterna	"Beyond Enemy Lines"	TV4 News	Sweden
2023	Shireen Abu Akleh's Killing		Al Jazeera English	Qatar
2023	Jornal Nacional and Fantástico	"The Murder of Bruno and Dom"	Globo	Brazil
2024	Channel 4 News	"Israel-Hamas at War"	Channel 4 News	United Kingdom
2024	GloboNews & RJ2	"Secret Payrolls"	TV Globo	Brazil
2024	Tragediata v lokorsko		Nova	Bulgaria
2024	War on Gaza		Al Jazeera English	Qatar
2025	Gaza, Search for Life		Al Jazeera News Directorate	Qatar
2025	Fantástico	"El Salvador: Safety's Somber Side"	Globo	Brazil
2025	Sky News	"The Gangs of Haiti"	Sky News	United Kingdom
2025	Syria – The Truth Coming Out		TV4	Sweden
2026	Fantástico	"Isolated in the Amazon"	Globo	Brazil
2026	Remember Me		TVI	Portugal
2026	Missing In Gaza		Al Jazeera Arabic Channel	Qatar
2026	Sky News	"The World: 24 Hours in the Kill Zone"	Sky News	United Kingdom

== See also ==
- List of International Emmy Award winners
- British Academy Television Award for Best News Coverage
