= Alvin Elchico =

Filipino journalist (born 1974)

- Born: January 30, 1974 (age 52); Bacolod, Negros Occidental, Philippines
- Education: University of St. La Salle, (BA)
- Occupations: Reporter, journalist, television presenter, radio personality
- Years active: 1992–present
- Employer: ABS-CBN (1992–present)
- Known for: Salamat Dok host (2011–2020); TV Patrol Weekend anchor (2011–2024); TV Patrol anchor (2024–present; formerly as a substitute anchor from 2018–2024)

Alvin Elchico (Tagalog pronunciation: [ʔɛlˈtʃikɔ]; born January 30, 1974) is a Filipino field reporter, newscaster, broadcast journalist and television host working for ABS-CBN and DZMM/DWPM. A business reporter early in his career, he was the sole journalist to report from inside the Oakwood Premier building during the Oakwood mutiny in July 2003. He is currently an anchor of ABS-CBN's evening news program TV Patrol and the morning news radio programs Gising Pilipinas and Radyo Patrol Balita: Alas-Siyete (formerly TeleRadyo Serbisyo Balita).

== Education ==
Elchico graduated Bachelor of Arts in mass communication from University of St. La Salle.

== Career ==
In 1992, Elchico started his broadcasting career as a field reporter at ABS-CBN Bacolod. he began also broadcasting career as a news anchor for TV Patrol Bacolod as TV Patrol Western Visayas from 1996 to 1999. In 1999, he transferred to Manila and first became a news writer at ABS-CBN's DZMM; then in 2002, he became a newsbreak (now News Patrol) anchor and eventually a field reporter. Despite being originally assigned to cover business-related news, Elchico was forced to cover the Oakwood mutiny on July 27, 2003, when he was the only journalist in the Oakwood Premier building who could cover the event in detail. He also became a narrator in TV Patrol and Bandila, wherein he narrated on Bandila vignettes.

From November 2011 to September 2024, Elchico was the anchor of TV Patrol Weekend, replacing Alex Santos. Pinky Webb was his co-anchor until 2015, followed by Zen Hernandez in July 2016. Elchico and Hernandez are the longest-serving tandem of the weekend edition, with Elchico being the longest-serving anchor of the weekend edition. He is also the senior business reporter of ABS-CBN. He also performs relief anchoring duties for the main TV Patrol edition when one of its anchors have been absent from October 2018 to August 2024. On September 2, 2024, he became the permanent anchor of TV Patrol, replacing Henry Omaga-Diaz who migrated to Canada and was later replaced by Adrian Ayalin on the weekend edition.

At DZMM and its television counterpart, DZMM TeleRadyo, Elchico anchored Usapang de Campanilla alongside Atty. Claire Castro, Konsyumer ATBP. (now replaced by Bida Konsyumer, this time with Elchico being the sole anchor) alongside the Department of Trade and Industry (Philippines), Usec. Ruth Castelo, Lakas ng Siyensya with Dr. Maria Josefina Arilay and S.R.O. or Suhestiyon, Reaksyon at Opinyon with Doris Bigornia.

From July 23, 2011, to May 3, 2020, Elchico is one of the hosts of the weekend medical morning program Salamat Dok together with Bernadette Sembrano.

Since June 30, 2023, Elchico, alongside Doris Bigornia, co-anchors Gising Pilipinas on DWPM, the successor of DZMM on the 630 kHz frequency, and its television counterpart, TeleRadyo Serbisyo. This also marked Elchico's return to AM radio after three years. He is also anchoring TeleRadyo Serbisyo Balita alongside Joyce Balancio (now replaced by Doris Bigornia) since July 22, 2024, replacing Noli de Castro. When DZMM was relaunched in place of DWPM on May 29, 2025, he became the first anchor to speak on air, anchoring the relaunched station's inaugural news bulletin. Few days later, TeleRadyo Serbisyo Balita was relaunched as the revived Radyo Patrol Balita: Alas-Siyete.

In June 2025, during his morning show Gising Pilipinas, Elchico used the phrase "bembang pa more," apparently unaware that the term "bembang" had acquired a different meaning among many younger people. The remark drew backlash online.

== Awards and citations ==
- 2012 Best Public Service Program Host: Salamat Dok! (along with Bernadette Sembrano) – 6th UPLB Gandingan Isko't Iska's Broadcast Choice Awards
