= Frankie Evangelista =

Filipino broadcaster (1934-2004)

- Born: Francisco Fermin Evangelista; July 24, 1934; Gapan, Nueva Ecija, Philippine Islands
- Died: February 18, 2004 (aged 69); Quezon City, Philippines
- Other names: Ka Kiko, Frank
- Education: University of the Philippines Diliman
- Occupation: Broadcaster
- Years active: 1956–2004
- Spouse: Patria Hipolito
- Children: 3
- Parents: Juan Nuñez Evangelista; Isabel Fermin

Francisco "Frankie" Fermin Evangelista (Tagalog pronunciation: [pɛɾˈmin ɛbɐŋhɛˈlistɐ], alternately [-vɐŋ-]; July 24, 1934 – February 18, 2004) was a Filipino newspaper columnist, radio and television broadcaster of Manila Chronicle (1956–1975), IBC (1975–1986), and ABS-CBN (1986–2004).

== Early life and career ==
Francisco Fermin Evangelista was born on July 24, 1934, in Gapan, Nueva Ecija, and his parents Juan Nuñez Evangelista and Isabel Fermin. Evangelista began studying at the age seven he attend grade school in Gapan and moved to Quezon City, he was enroll in High School of Saint Joseph's College of Quezon City graduated in 1952 and he finished at the University of the Philippines Diliman as course offered in AB Communication and Journalism graduated in 1956. In 1957, he started out as to be a credible newscaster. He had a distinguished career in radio and his live coverage of special events was always competent. He became the voice that impelled errant government officials to shape up in the Hoy Gising! portion of Radyo Patrol.

Evangelista, also known as Ka Kiko (Ka being the shorter version for kapatid or sibling), had career within ABS-CBN that spanned the entire 50-year history of the network. First hired as a radio personality, he rose to become a vital force in ABS-CBN's television shows as well, with credits that include news (TV Patrol, Hoy Gising!) and even entertainment (as an executive producer on the pre-Martial Law comedy show Super Laff-In). He is also known to be the color TV announcer when ABS-CBN began to air color programs starting in 1966 (accompanied by the station identification of the Sarimanok to represent color, similar to NBC’s Peacock) with a line “The following program is brought to you in color.”

Ka Kiko was last seen on his ANC shows Dateline Philippines and ANC News 3 PM, and was lastly heard on his DZMM talk show Hoy Gising. He appeared on the ABS-CBN 50th Anniversary documentaries Sa Mata ng Balita and Limampung Taong Ligawan.

== Personal life ==
He was married to Patria Hipolito. They had 3 children: Maria Isabel, Roberto and Maria Luisa.

== Death ==
Evangelista died at the age of 69 on February 18, 2004, of an undisclosed illness at the De Los Santos Medical Center. In a statement, ABS-CBN Vice-Chairman Jake Almeda-Lopez said of Mr. Evangelista's death, "The entire ABS-CBN family is saddened by the news about our friend Frankie. In a very true sense, he was one of the nicest fellows that I have met here in ABS-CBN. We were colleagues since before Martial Law, and he was one of the most professional of our broadcasters. ABS-CBN joins his family in this hour of grief."

== Filmography ==
=== Film ===
- Father en Son (1995)

=== Television ===
- TV Patrol (1987–1996)
