= TV Patrol =

Philippine television news show

- Logo since January 3, 2022
- Also known as: TV Patrol World (2004–2010)
- Genre: News broadcasting
- Created by: ABS-CBN Corporation; Freddie M. Garcia; Angelo Castro Jr.; Rolly Cruz
- Written by: Baj Bajandre; Bimbo Papasin
- Directed by: Henry Ballesteros; Kits Fernandez
- Presented by: Noli de Castro; Karen Davila; Bernadette Sembrano; Alvin Elchico
- Voices of: Peter Musñgi
- Narrated by: Peter Musñgi (1987–present); Noli de Castro (1987–2001; 2010–2021; 2023–present); Vic de Leon Lima (until 2010)
- Theme music composer: Vangelis (1987–1994); Ryan Cayabyab (1994–1996); Jesse Lasaten (2001–2004); Frank Gari (arranged by Jimmy Antiporda)
- Country of origin: Philippines
- Original language: Filipino

Production
- Executive producer: Jaime "Jabs" Bolok
- Production locations: Studio 7, ABS-CBN Broadcasting Center, Diliman, Quezon City, Metro Manila; ABS-CBN Garden
- Camera setup: Multiple-camera setup
- Running time: 1 hour (1987–1996; 1999; 2001–2006); 30 minutes (1996–1999; 1999–2004); 70 minutes (2006–2010); 75 minutes (2006–2020); 90 minutes (2009–present)
- Production company: ABS-CBN News and Current Affairs

Original release
- Network: ABS-CBN
- Release: March 2, 1987 – May 5, 2020
- Network: DZMM TeleRadyo; PRTV Prime Media
- Release: April 12, 2007 – present
- Network: ANC
- Release: March 17, 2020 – present
- Network: Cine Mo!
- Release: May 8 – July 24, 2020
- Network: Kapamilya Channel
- Release: July 27, 2020 – present
- Network: A2Z
- Release: January 3, 2022 – present
- Network: All TV
- Release: April 15, 2024 – present

TV Patrol is a Philippine television news broadcasting show broadcast by ABS-CBN, Kapamilya Channel, A2Z and All TV. Originally anchored by Noli de Castro, Mel Tiangco and Robert Arevalo, it premiered on March 2, 1987, on the network's Primetime Bida line up. De Castro, Karen Davila, Bernadette Sembrano and Alvin Elchico currently serve as the anchors. It is the longest running Filipino-language news program.

== History ==
=== 1986–2004: Pre-launch and TV Patrol (first iteration) ===
Following the People Power Revolution in February 1986 and ABS-CBN's reopening of operations, ABS-CBN News executives, among them then-News Manager Angelo Castro Jr., began holding meetings with higher-ups on plans to launch an all-new news program that will serve as a replacement to Balita Ngayon. On March 1, 1987, ABS-CBN announced the launch of TV Patrol during the public variety extravaganza "Ang Pagbabalik ng Bituin" (lit. transl. The Return of the Star) at Luneta Park, Manila.

TV Patrol premiered on March 2, 1987, at 6:00 p.m. PHT, replacing Balita Ngayon, with Noli de Castro, Mel Tiangco and Robert Arevalo as the original anchors. Segment anchors included Ernie Baron, who served as the newscast's chief meteorologist and provided viewers trivia pertaining to science and history, and actress-personality Angelique Lazo for Star News. However, on June 1, 1987, Arevalo left the newscast and was replaced by Frankie Evangelista, who became segment host for "PULSO: Pangkalahatang Ugnayan Laan sa Opinyon" (lit. transl. Overall Correlation Reserved for Opinions) – which served as the newscast's nightly opinion-editorial piece.

With the introduction of international broadcasts in 1989 to the Pacific islands of Guam and Saipan, and later with the birth of TFC on September 24, 1994, TV Patrol became the first Philippine newscast and program to broadcast overseas.

In 1993, Christine Bersola replaced Angelique Lazo as the Star News segment hostess. Mel Tiangco would leave the newscast and transfer to GMA Network in 1996.

On July 1, 1996, Noli de Castro became the sole anchor of the newscast, which had reduced its airtime to 30 minutes, emulating the styles of American network news programs. This reformat was ABS-CBN's effort to counter-program the success of the Tagalog-dubbed airing of the Mexican telenovela, MariMar, on RPN-9. On January 4, 1999, TV Patrol re-expanded its airtime to 1 hour.

On February 14, 2000, TV Patrol started simulcasting over DZMM (Metro Manila), DYAB-AM (Cebu), and DXAB-AM (Davao) and began its online presence through the ABS-CBN News website. On February 12, 2001, de Castro left the newscast to run for Senator in the 2001 elections. Henry Omaga-Diaz temporarily replaced de Castro the day after.

On March 12, 2001, Korina Sanchez, together with Aljo Bendijo, joined Omaga-Diaz as new co-anchors – returning the newscast into a three-man presentation. Marc Logan and Tina Monzon-Palma were also hired for trivial segments, tongue-in-cheek satire and environmental features. Cheryl Cosim, Pinky Webb, Erwin Tulfo, Ces Drilon and Kathy San Gabriel were designated as substitute anchors when any of the three were unavailable or on assignment.

On April 21, 2003, TV Patrol relaunched its multipurpose studio set, news desk, and graphics, along with the theme music & a silhouetted OBB. Julius Babao replaced Bendijo and Omaga-Diaz after several interim changes in the anchor chair. In the same year, TV Patrol also simulcast on ABS-CBN's UHF sister station Studio 23 for several months. In March 2004, Babao later joined Sanchez at the news studio after broadcasting from Studio 7.

Aside from its reformat, TV Patrol adopted ABS-CBN News' 2004 slogan, "Subok na Maaasahan" (lit. transl. Proven to be Reliable).

By September 2004, the ratings of TV Patrol began to decline due to competition with rival GMA's new primetime newscast 24 Oras. Thus, the ABS-CBN management decided to relaunch TV Patrol before the end of the same year. On November 19, Sanchez left the newscast for the second time to make way for the impending rebrand.

=== 2004–2012: TV Patrol World and TV Patrol (second iteration) ===
On November 22, 2004, the program was renamed as TV Patrol World to give additional weight to reports from Filipino communities worldwide. Babao was joined by Ted Failon and Karen Davila – essentially reviving the three-anchor format. Ernie Baron remained as weather and trivias host while Phoemela Baranda became Star Patrol hostess and Marc Logan continued for the new Tambayan Ni Marc Logan. Bernadette Sembrano became segment hostess for "Sahip Kapamilya" charity drives. Baron would die of a heart attack on January 23, 2006, and months later Kim Atienza was brought in as the newscast's resident weatherman.

On April 8, 2005, TV Patrol World aired a special edition as a conclusion to ABS-CBN's all-afternoon live coverage of the burial of Pope John Paul II, dubbed as "Paalam Ama Mula Sa Bayang Minahal Mo" (transl. "Goodbye Pope, from the Country you Loved"). Erwin Tulfo, Korina Sanchez, and Dong Puno anchored live from the ABS-CBN Newscenter in Quezon City, as Julius Babao and Karen Davila joined Lynda Jumilla live from the Vatican City. Mari Kaimo, Bernadette Sembrano and Henry Omaga-Diaz reported from the Papal memorial in Rizal Park, Manila.

On June 5, 2006, TV Patrol World updated its logo design, soundtrack, opening billboard, and graphics. In January 2007, TV Patrol World started its 20th anniversary celebration by launching Boto Mo, I-Patrol Mo!, an expansion of the citizen journalism segment Citizen Patrol for the upcoming 2007 midterm elections. On April 12, 2007, TV Patrol World began simulcasting on DZMM TeleRadyo, the then-newly launched sister cable television channel of DZMM.

On November 25, 2007, ABS-CBN aired a documentary special for TV Patrol's 20th anniversary entitled TV Patrol World: 20 Taon ng Pagpapatrol (lit. transl. TV Patrol World: 20 Years of Patrolling). It was produced by ABS-CBN and Jesuit Communications.

A few days after the documentary was aired, on November 29, 2007. TV Patrol World morphed into News Patrol Special Edition covering the events surrounding the Manila Peninsula siege. Anchored by Ted Failon and Korina Sanchez as part of the network's marathon coverage of the rebellion during the day, the edition shocked millions as it featured live the last few hours of the siege, including the arrest of ABS-CBN journalist Ces Oreña-Drilon and scores of local and foreign media personalities by the Philippine military for allegedly conspiring with the rebellion perpetrators.

On March 31, 2008, TV Patrol World unveiled its new set, graphics (with the same red, green, and blue hues identified with the ABS-CBN logo), opening billboard, and new segments, while retaining some of its familiar segments. The new look is accompanied by slight changes in Patrol's segments, particularly Citizen Patrol, and the introduction of the charity drive segment Hulog ng Langit, anchored by Bernadette Sembrano. The same year, Boto Mo, I-Patrol Mo temporarily became Bayan Mo, I-Patrol Mo. During this period, the newscast held the highest nationwide TV ratings record since Taylon Nelson Sofres (TNS) started conducting its nationwide TV ratings survey when its April 16, 2009 edition featured the developing story of the tragedy involving Ted Failon's wife. This caused an indefinite leave for the anchorman that lasted until June 2009.

On August 5, 2009, TV Patrol World aired its longest broadcast in history up to that time as it covered the interment of former President Corazon Aquino at the Manila Memorial Park in Parañaque. Lasting from 6:25 to 9:00pm, this was the most widely watched show in Mega Manila and nationwide on that day as cited by TNS and AGB. This special edition was anchored by Julius Babao, Korina Sanchez and Ted Failon.

On June 28, 2010, TV Patrol World reverted to the original debut title (TV Patrol), introduced their first main website and launched its Facebook and Twitter pages. Failon, Davila, and Babao were carried over as anchors for the weeknight edition while Phoemela Baranda remained as Star Patrol segment anchor until November 5.

On August 23, 2010, TV Patrol covered the Manila hostage crisis with the longest telecast up to that point, lasting about three and a half hours from 6:25 to 10:00 pm, with a separate second edition airing in the aftermath of the crisis from 9:00 pm. The August 23 edition drew flak from various concerned viewers and became the catalyst for the revision of ABS-CBN News's Code of Ethics. It eventually got a Finalist nod in the 2011 New York Festivals.

On October 4, 2010, Winner sa Life! with Winnie Cordero was launched as a lifestyle segment and features on proper living.

On November 3, 2010, ABS-CBN announced the return of veteran former anchors Noli de Castro and Korina Sanchez as weeknight anchors of TV Patrol, replacing Karen Davila and Julius Babao (as they would transfer to the late-night newscast Bandila later that month); they joined Ted Failon on November 8. On the same day, Gretchen Fullido replaced Phoemela Baranda as Star Patrol hostess.

In February 2011, TV Patrol launched its weekday text poll, the first in Philippine television news history, where texters can agree or disagree on the current issues being broadcast in the program. The text poll happens from Monday to Thursday but was soon expanded to Fridays. Before the end of the newscast, the three anchors gave their opinions about the result of the text poll, similar to the PULSO segment popularized by Frankie Evangelista. New patriotic segments like Panalo 'To! (transl. It's a Winner!) and Lakas ng Pinoy (transl. Pinoy's Strength) debuted in April of the same year.

From May 11, 2009 to December 22, 2011, TV Patrol covered the transition of all levels of Philippine national and local government including the cancelled 2011 Autonomous Region in Muslim Mindanao (ARMM) election that led to the appointment of officers-in-charge (OIC) when the officials from the 2008–2011 term ended spanned for 2 years – relaunching Boto Mo, I-Patrol Mo with the battlecry, Ako Ang Simula (transl. It Begins With Me). In response to the first utilization of automated elections in the country, ABS-CBN unveiled a technology from Orad Hi Tech Systems Ltd. that utilizes the principles of augmented reality. The technology uses real-time image processing system for live broadcasts of 3D computer-generated imagery against a real set or background. ABS-CBN also used the largest touch screen display to be used in Philippine television. A new set dubbed as the "WAR" (Wireless Audience Response) room was specifically designed for the said election coverage. The coverage of ABS-CBN became the third top trending topic worldwide on the social networking site Twitter. STI College and ABS-CBN have also rolled up for the 2010 SK and barangay elections.

=== 2012–2020: TV Patrol (25th anniversary and third iteration) ===
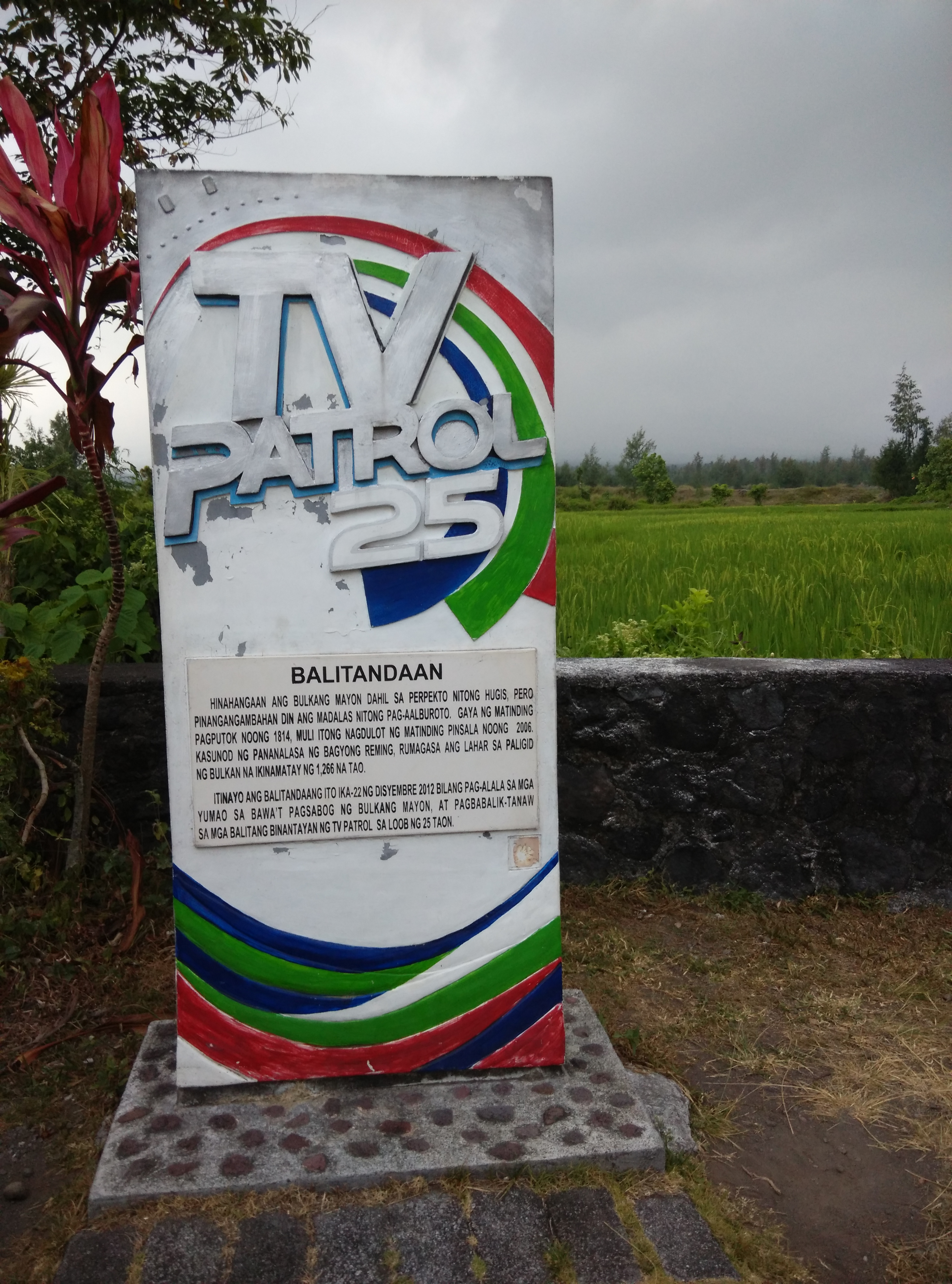
A Balitandaan marker at Cagsawa Ruins Park in Daraga, Albay. A portmanteau of balita (news) and tandaan (marker), Balitandaan markers were unveiled to commemorate TV Patrol's 25th anniversary.

To celebrate TV Patrol's 25th anniversary from 2012 to 2013, TV Patrol reformatted its graphics and introduced a new logo (still using the "ribbons" theme) and new opening titles (featuring the current and previous logos) on March 5, 2012. A retrospective segment was also added to commemorate the most notable events covered by the newscast during the first 25 years. On April 2, 2012, the newly improved weather graphics and reporting (ABS-CBN Weather Center) was launched, including a five-day forecast.

Commemorative activities include TV Patrol 25 marker openings in various parts of the country to honor the many important events marked in the first 25 years and a fund-raising drive aimed at giving back to those who became part of the news coverage through the years. A new segment, CCTV (Concerned Citizens Taking Videos) Patrol, was launched on June 25, 2012, aimed at citizen journalism and even utilizing CCTV footage and even cellphone footage from the public to convey the latest local news events.

On July 29, 2012, a documentary special entitled Mga Nagbabagang Balita: 25 Taon ng TV Patrol (transl. The Breaking News: 25 Years of TV Patrol) was aired in celebration of its 25th anniversary. It was replayed on August 12 due to public demand.

On July 29, 2013, TV Patrol, alongside Bandila, reformatted their logo, opening titles, and graphics. The redesigned logo was still based on the "ribbons" theme, but were more simplified. A new set was also unveiled with a brighter flooring and background. New segment designs were launched with the exception of Kabayan Special Patrol.

In March 2014, TV Patrol launched the ABS-CBN News Investigative Reports, giving viewers a nationwide insight into various societal scandals and problems. These reports were filed by Henry Omaga-Diaz, Gigi Grande, and Raffy Santos

On August 3, 2015, former TV Patrol Weekend anchor Bernadette Sembrano permanently replaced Sanchez, who left the newscast for the last time to pursue her masteral degree at Ateneo de Manila University and London School of Economics.

On March 2, 2017, TV Patrol celebrated its 30th anniversary through a live triplecast from Quezon City and its sister stations in Tacloban and Zamboanga City. Sembrano was situated at the ABS-CBN studio, while Failon was in Tacloban and de Castro in Zamboanga.

On August 24, 2017, the show featured celebrities as "Star Patrol" guest anchors, a practice that has been returned after two years of hiatus. Yassi Pressman, Toni Gonzaga, Bela Padilla, Kim Chiu, Bianca Gonzalez, Erich Gonzales, Kylie Verzosa, Mariel de León, Janella Salvador, Aiko Melendez, Karylle, Karla Estrada, Anne Curtis, and Angel Locsin filled in the slot of Fullido occasionally. Earlier in 2015, actresses Yam Concepcion and Loren Burgos, and athlete Gretchen Ho had taken the helm as pinch-hitters for the segment.

On April 2, 2018, TV Patrol began broadcasting in high definition.

On March 17, 2020, TV Patrol began airing a late-night encore on the timeslot of late-night newscast Bandila due to the enhanced community quarantine in Luzon caused by the COVID-19 pandemic in the Philippines. On the same day, it began simulcasting on the network's 24-hour cable news channel, ANC. The decision to adopt late night replays expanded the telecast to at least two hours.

In April 2020, sign language interpreters were added to the broadcast.

On May 5, 2020, TV Patrol was the last program to be aired on ABS-CBN, MOR, and S+A before they signed-off indefinitely that night (DZMM and its television counterpart, TeleRadyo, also aired this edition of the newscast but signed off together at 8:20 p.m. PHT following the newscast's lead-out program S.R.O.: Suhestyon, Reaksyon at Opinyon), following the cease-and-desist order issued by the National Telecommunications Commission (NTC) to close the free TV and radio broadcasting operations of ABS-CBN as the network's broadcasting franchise expired the day before. This edition focused on such cease-and-desist order and also aired without commercial breaks.

=== 2020–present: TV Patrol (post-shutdown iteration) ===
As a result, on May 7, 2020, TV Patrol temporarily migrated to ANC, The Filipino Channel, Cine Mo! (until July 24, 2020), and on digital platforms with ANC assuming the program's production. TeleRadyo would resume simulcasting the newscast on May 8, 2020.

On June 30, 2020, TV Patrol temporarily ceased broadcast on free-to-air television due to the cease-and-desist order against ABS-CBN TV Plus.

TV Patrol was supposed to simulcast on Kapamilya Channel, the network's ad interim replacement to ABS-CBN for cable and satellite providers beginning June 15, 2020, but it was instead excluded from the channel's programming schedule until July 27. According to Kim Atienza and Gretchen Fullido, this was due to the existing presence on ANC, other digital channels, and social media platforms. By this point, TV Patrol's airtime was shortened from 110 minutes to 90 minutes. Kapamilya Channel fully took over production of the newscast from July 27 onwards.

On August 31, 2020, Ted Failon made his final appearance through Zoom as he left the network as part of its retrenchment program; The departure of Failon also led the August 31 edition to end with the song "Tinig ng mga Nawalan" (English: Voice of the Lost), sung by Kathryn Bernardo and Daniel Padilla in support for the retrenched employees. From September 7 to October 2, former weekday anchors Julius Babao, Karen Davila and Henry Omaga-Diaz and then-weekend anchor Alvin Elchico rotated as the third weeknight interim anchor until Omaga-Diaz was confirmed as Failon's replacement, starting October 5.

From April 21 to May 4, 2021, de Castro, Sembrano, and Omaga-Diaz were on self-quarantine, with Sembrano later testing positive for COVID-19. Given this, Davila, Babao, Jorge Cariño and TV Patrol Weekend anchors Alvin Elchico and Zen Hernandez rotated as the three temporary weeknight anchors, with either Elchico and/or Babao designated as the lead anchors. The newscast temporarily aired live from an outdoor area within the ABS-CBN premises, while Fullido and Atienza were seen via Zoom, instead of the regular news studio. On May 5, 2021, coinciding with the first anniversary of the ABS-CBN shutdown, the news studio was used again for broadcast, although de Castro, Atienza, and Fullido were the only anchors present, four days after Sembrano announced that she had recovered from the disease.

On October 1, 2021, Kim Atienza made his final appearance as resident weather presenter as he transferred to GMA Network. Two months later on December 13, former PAGASA weather specialist Ariel Rojas joined as the resident weather meteorologist and became a permanent replacement to Atienza.

Six days later on October 7, Noli de Castro temporarily left the newscast to run for senator once again; however, he withdrew his candidacy and, as a result, he soon returned to ABS-CBN through TeleRadyo. He was replaced by former anchor Karen Davila, who joined Omaga-Diaz and Sembrano on October 11. With her arrival, Omaga-Diaz was elevated as lead anchor.

On October 25, TV Patrol launched three new segments: "Winning Moment" with Winnie Cordero, "Alam N'yo Ba?" (lit. transl. Did You Know?) with Boyet Sison, and the returning "Mga Kwento ni Marc Logan" (lit. transl. Stories of Marc Logan) with Marc Logan. On December 31, former anchor Julius Babao made his final appearance on the newscast as substitute presenter ahead of his departure from the network, Babao would transfer to TV5 as lead anchor for the competing Frontline Pilipinas.

On January 1, 2022, TV Patrol officially began simulcasting on A2Z, marking its return to free-to-air television after almost two years since the final broadcast on ABS-CBN. With this historic return, it came with a brand new opening billboard, logo, and on-air graphics introduced on January 3. Another new segment in "Uso at Bago" (lit. transl. Trend and New) with Migs Bustos was launched. Alam N'yo Ba segment anchor Boyet Sison, died on April 16, 2022, and was replaced by Bustos on June 30.

From May 27 to November 1, 2022, the free-to-air broadcast on TeleRadyo resumed as a digital subchannel of A2Z.

Coinciding with the Feast of the Black Nazarene on January 9, 2023, Noli de Castro returned to the newscast for his third stint, joining Davila, Sembrano, and Omaga-Diaz, regaining his role as lead anchor and making TV Patrol a quadruple-presenter format.

On June 30, 2023, TV Patrol marked its return to AM radio through its simulcast on DWPM Radyo 630, ABS-CBN's new AM radio station under the joint venture with Prime Media Holdings that was soft-launched earlier that day. It was also carried over to the station's television counterpart, TeleRadyo Serbisyo. The simulcast would later continue on the restored DZMM on May 30, 2025, hours after AM 630 rebranded the previous night.

On February 2, 2024, Marc Logan silently made his final appearance on the newscast, as he transferred to TV5 on March 8.

On April 15, 2024, the newscast began its simulcast on All TV, marking its return to channels 2 and 16 in Mega Manila and regional channels previously held by ABS-CBN. On May 6, TV Patrol marked its return to FM radio when its simulcast on FMR Radio Philippines stations outside Mega Manila began, years after the end of a similar service on selected MOR stations, DYAB-AM (Cebu), DXAB-AM (Davao), and DYAP-AM (Palawan). On May 27, it began simulcasting on the newly-launched Prime TV (now PRTV Prime Media), expanding its free-to-air television broadcast.

On August 30, 2024, Omaga-Diaz made his final appearance as he would migrate to Canada. He was replaced by Alvin Elchico on September 2. On December 19, 2024, de Castro began a series of temporary medical leaves. After returning on February 4, 2025, he subsequently took another hiatus in October. His third and ongoing medical leave began on November 7, 2025.

On March 11, 2025, TV Patrol aired its longest telecast – a cumulative time of four hours, surpassing its August 2010 coverage of the Manila hostage crisis in view of the arrest of former president Rodrigo Duterte, with all anchors present for its first 90 minutes on terrestrial and digital platforms before Alvin Elchico and Karen Davila led a cable-and-digital-only extension on ANC and ABS-CBN News' YouTube channel until 10:30 p.m. when The World Tonight took over its coverage.

== Anchors ==
Anchors

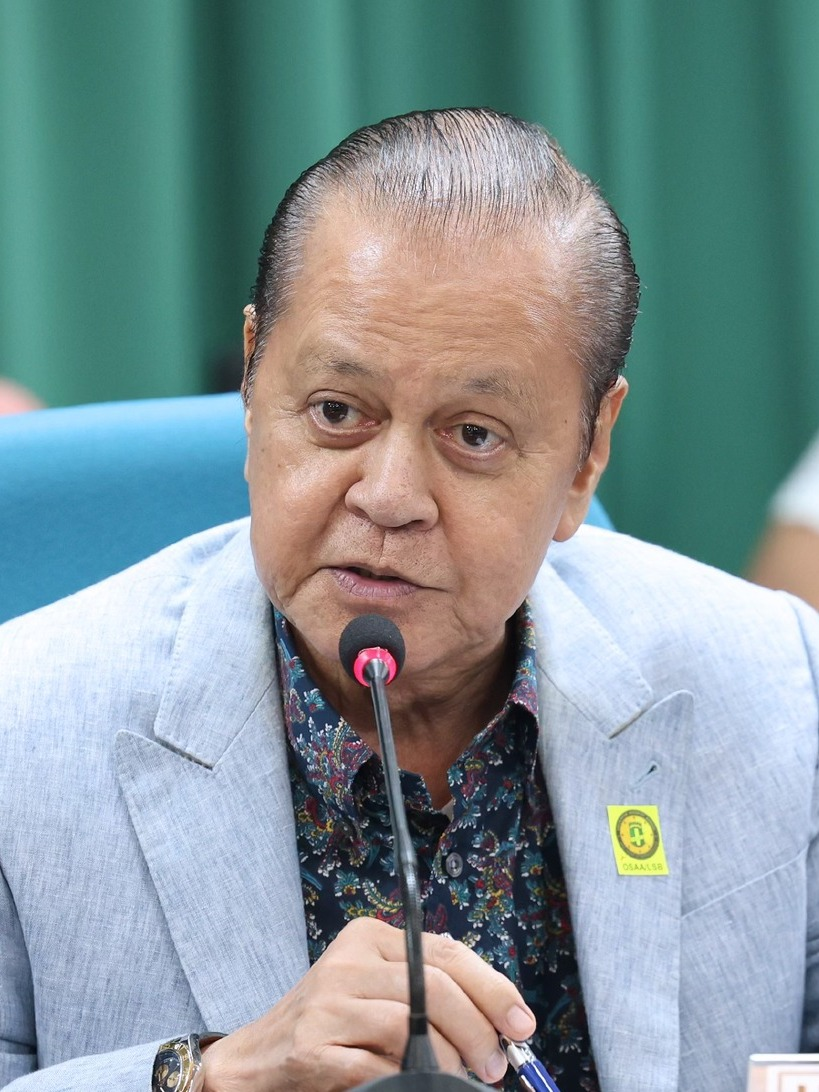
Noli de Castro

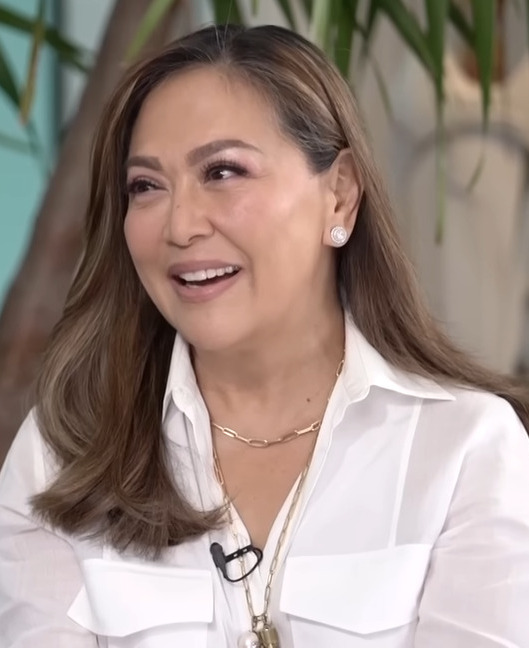
Karen Davila

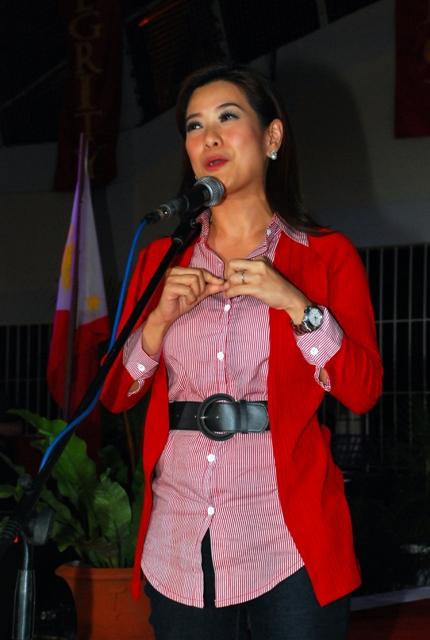
Bernadette Sembrano

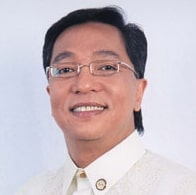
Ted Failon

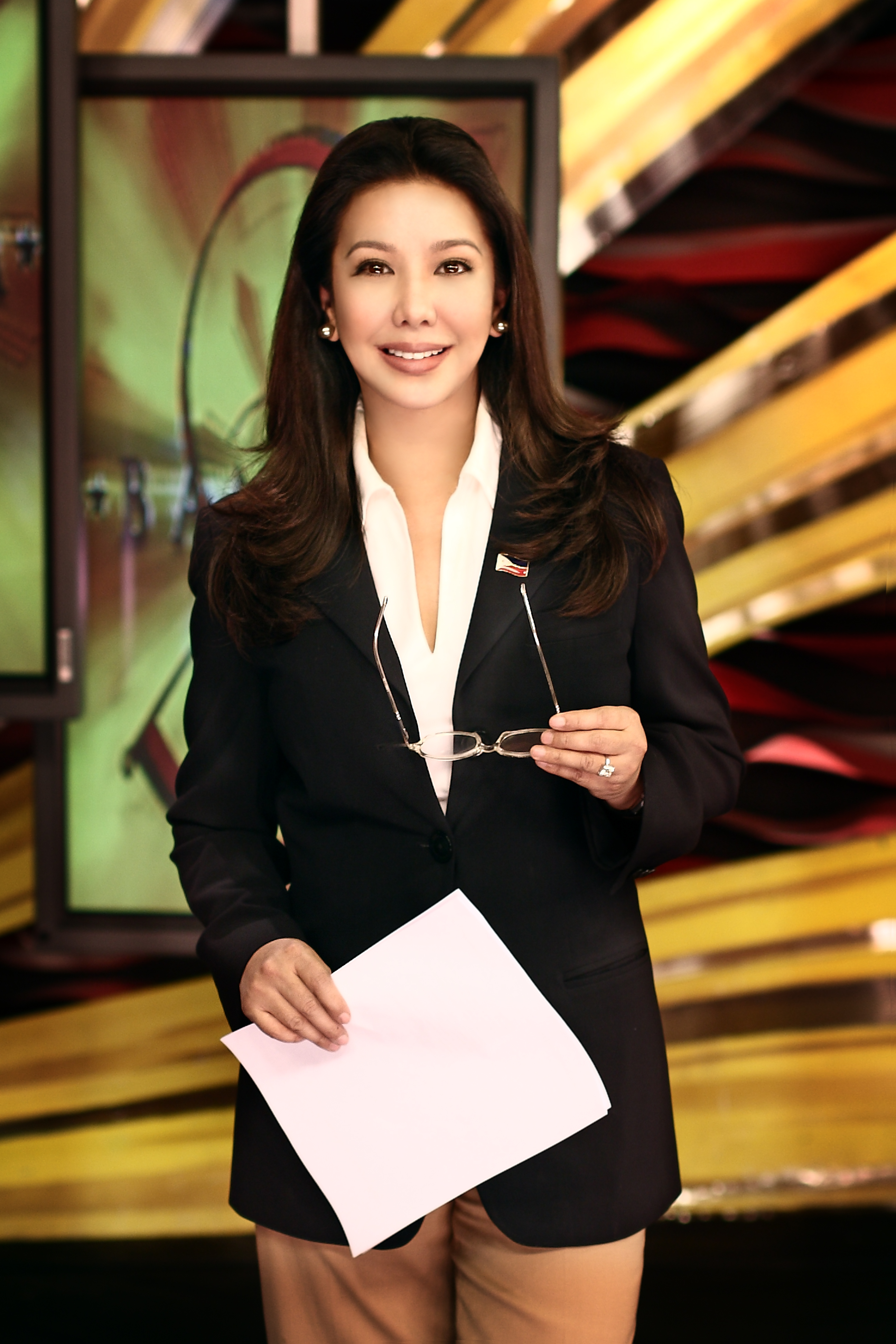
Korina Sanchez

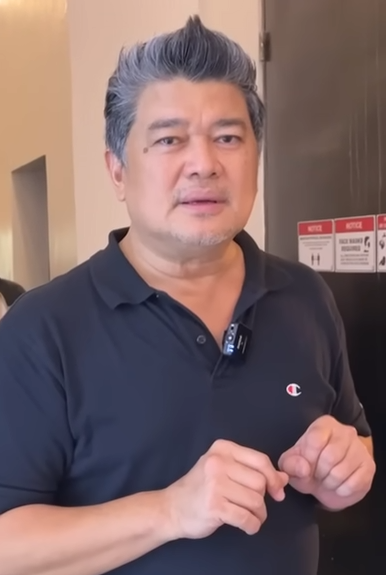
Julius Babao

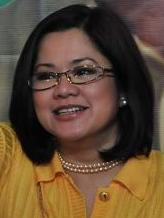
Kata Inocencio

- Noli de Castro (1987–2001, 2010–2021, 2023–present; on hiatus)
- Karen Davila (2004–2010, 2021–present)
- Bernadette Sembrano (2015–present)
- Alvin Elchico (2024–present)

Substitute anchors

- Adrian Ayalin (2024–present)
- Denice Dinsay (2025–present)
- Jeff Canoy (2025–present)
- Tony Velasquez (2026–present)
- Zen Hernandez (2017–present)

Segment anchors

- Ariel Rojas (2021–present; "Weather Patrol", "Kwentong Napa-Panahon")
- Bernadette Sembrano (2004–present; "Lingkod Kapamilya" and "Tao Po!")
- Dyan Castillejo (2004–present; "Sports Patrol")
- Gretchen Fullido (2010–present; "Star Patrol")
- Migs Bustos (2022–present; "Alam Nyo Ba?!" and "Uso at Bago")
- Noli de Castro (2012–2021, 2023–present; "KBYN Special", formerly "Kabayan Special Patrol")
- Winnie Cordero (2010–present; "Winning Moment", formerly "Winner sa Life")
- Karen Davila (2023–present; "My Puhunan, Kaya Mo!")
- Johnson Manabat (2026–present; "TV Patrol Explains")

Former anchors

- Aljo Bendijo (2000–2001 as a substitute anchor for de Castro; 2001–2003 as an anchor)
- Cherie Mercado (1995–2004 as a reporter and/or substitute anchor for Tiangco or Sanchez)
- Cheryl Cosim (1996–2010 as a reporter and/or substitute anchor for Davila or Sanchez)
- Connie Sison (1998–2006 as a reporter and/or substitute anchor for de Castro or Sanchez)
- Ely Aligora (1987–1996 as a reporter and/or substitute anchor for de Castro or Evangelista)
- Erwin Tulfo (1995–2006 as a reporter and/or substitute anchor for de Castro, Bendijo or Omaga-Diaz, Babao, or Failon)
- Frankie Evangelista (1987–96)
- Gel Santos-Relos (1987–1996 as a reporter and/or substitute anchor for Tiangco or Arevalo/Evangelista or de Castro)
- Danny Buenafe (1992–1996 as a reporter and/or substitute anchor for Evangelista)
- Henry Omaga-Diaz (1991–2001 as a reporter and/or substitute anchor for de Castro or Evangelista; 2001–2003 and 2020–2024 as an anchor)
- Johnson Manabat (2022–24; as a substitute anchor)
- Julius Babao (1993–1996 as a reporter and/or substitute anchor for de Castro; 2011–2021 as a substitute anchor for de Castro, Failon or Omaga-Diaz; 2003–2010 as an anchor)
- Kathy San Gabriel (2001–2004 as a reporter and/or substitute anchor for Sanchez)
- Kata Inocencio (1987–1996 as a reporter and/or substitute anchor for Tiangco or Arevalo/Evangelista or de Castro)
- Korina Sanchez-Roxas (1987–95 as a reporter and/or substitute anchor for Tiangco or Arevalo/Evangelista or de Castro; 2001–2004 and 2010–2015 as an anchor)
- Luchi Cruz-Valdes (1987–1988 as a reporter and/or substitute anchor for Tiangco or Arevalo/Evangelista or de Castro)
- Mel Tiangco (1987–1995)
- Robert Arevalo (1987)
- Ted Failon (1990–1996 as a reporter and/or substitute anchor for de Castro or Evangelista; 2004–2020 as an anchor)
- Jorge Cariño (2019–2022; as a substitute anchor for de Castro, Failon or Omaga-Diaz)
- Pia Hontiveros (1989–1996 as a reporter and/or substitute anchor for Tiangco)
- Pia Gutierrez (2015–2025; as a substitute anchor for Sembrano or Davila)

Segment anchors

- Angelique Lazo (1987–1993; "Star News")
- Boyet Sison (2021–2022; "Alam N'yo Ba?")
- Christine Bersola-Babao (1993–1996; "Star News")
- Ernie Baron (1987–2006; Weather)
- Kim Atienza (2006–2021; "Weather Weather Lang", "Alamin kay Kuya Kim", and "Kaunting Kaalaman")
- Marc Logan (1997–2024; "Mga Kwento ni Marc Logan")
- Patricia Opel (1991–1996; as a showbiz reporter and or/substitute anchor for Lazo/Bersola-Babao for "Star News")
- Phoemela Baranda (2004–2010; "Star Patrol")
- Tina Monzon-Palma (2004–2007; "Lingkod Kapamilya")

== TV Patrol Weekend ==
TV Patrol Weekend
- Title card since January 8, 2022
- Also known as: TV Patrol Sabado (2004–2010); TV Patrol Linggo (2004–2010)
- Genre: News broadcasting
- Created by: ABS-CBN Corporation; Freddie M. García; Angelo Castro, Jr. Rolly Cruz (co-creator)
- Written by: Baj Bajandre; Bimbo Papasin
- Directed by: Kits Fernandez
- Presented by: Zen Hernandez; Adrian Ayalin
- Voices of: Peter Musñgi
- Narrated by: Peter Musñgi; Adrian Ayalin
- Theme music composer: Frank Gari (arranged by Neocolours' Jimmy Antiporda)
- Country of origin: Philippines
- Original language: Filipino

Production
- Production locations: Studio 7, ABS-CBN Broadcasting Center, Diliman, Quezon City, Metro Manila
- Camera setup: Multiple-camera setup
- Running time: 30 minutes (2004–2005; 2007–2020); 45 minutes (2005–2007; 2023–present); 1 hour (2020–present)
- Production company: ABS-CBN News and Current Affairs

Original release
- Network: ABS-CBN
- Release: February 14, 2004 – May 3, 2020
- Network: DZMM TeleRadyo; PRTV Prime Media
- Release: April 14, 2007 – June 27, 2010
- Release: March 21, 2020 – present
- Network: ANC
- Release: March 28, 2020 – present
- Network: Cine Mo!
- Release: May 9 – July 26, 2020
- Network: Kapamilya Channel
- Release: August 1, 2020 – present
- Network: A2Z
- Release: January 1, 2022 – present
- Network: All TV
- Release: April 20, 2024 – present

TV Patrol first aired on weekends as an occasional special broadcast during major breaking news coverage. Its first special weekend broadcasts in September 2001 featured news about the American–Afghan battle during the War in Afghanistan and coverage of the September 11 attacks. TV Patrol also aired as part of the network's coverage during the Oakwood mutiny on July 27, 2003, and former U.S. President George W. Bush's state visit to the Philippines on October 18, 2003. These special weekend editions were anchored by Mari Kaimo, Pia Hontiveros and Erwin Tulfo.

TV Patrol Sabado premiered on February 14, 2004 at 6:30 p.m. PHT on the network's Saturday evening lineup, while the Sunday edition – TV Patrol Linggo premiered on May 9, 2004 at 6:00 p.m. PHT on the eve of the 2004 elections. Henry Omaga-Diaz and Ces Drilon served as the first anchors of both weekend editions. Upon launch, both editions were complemented by The Weekend News as ABS-CBN's weekend newscasts, with TV Patrol Sabado and TV Patrol Linggo for the evening primetime slot and The Weekend News on late-night until TWN was cancelled after just over a year. After the late-evening complement ended broadcasts, the weekend editions were moved to occupy middle evening time slots before 10:00 p.m. PHT. It also shared an identical title card, opening theme, and graphics with the then-TV Patrol World.

On June 18, 2005, Bernadette Sembrano replaced Drilon, as the latter became the anchorwoman for the late-evening weeknight ABS-CBN Insider. On July 8, 2006, Alex Santos replaced Omaga-Diaz, who became anchorman for Insider's replacement, Bandila.

On July 3, 2010, three days after the revamp of the regular edition, the two weekend editions were merged into TV Patrol Weekend and moved to an earlier timeslot of 5:00 p.m. every Saturday and 5:45 pm every Sunday.

On November 26, 2011, Sembrano and Santos were replaced by Pinky Webb and Alvin Elchico.

On May 6, 2015, Webb left the network to later join CNN Philippines. Various female ABS-CBN reporters rotated as the interim co-anchor with Elchico until Zen Hernandez permanently replaced her on July 9, 2016.

On April 1, 2018, the weekend edition started to be shown in high definition. Beginning March 21, 2020, the program expanded to 45 minutes in weekends, and on March 28 began airing on both TeleRadyo and ABS-CBN News Channel for the first time in 16 years (Sundays only, with program beginning a Saturday broadcast on ANC beginning April 25 that same year). The broadcast's return to DZMM TeleRadyo was the first to be aired there after ten years of absence.

On May 9, 2020, TV Patrol Weekend began to air on Cine Mo! after ABS-CBN and DZMM went off-air on May 5, 2020, due to cease-and-desist order issued by the National Telecommunications Commission after its franchise expired on May 4, 2020, while on TeleRadyo it began to broadcast on Saturdays. The newscast also extended its broadcast time to 50 minutes, and later on to a full hour.

On August 1, 2020, the weekend edition began airing on Kapamilya Channel. It later expanded its airtime from 45 minutes to an hour on October 21. On January 1, 2022, the weekend edition returned on free-to-air television via simulcast on A2Z. On June 17, 2023, following programming changes on Kapamilya Channel and A2Z, the newscast reduced its airtime to 45 minutes and returned to a timeslot of 5:30 p.m. to 6:15 p.m. PHT.

The broadcast of the weekend edition returned to AM radio via DWPM (now DZMM) on July 1, 2023. It was also carried over to TeleRadyo Serbisyo that same day. It would regain carriage on channels 2 and 16 in Mega Manila (and eventually to other regional stations also previously held by ABS-CBN) via All TV on April 20, 2024. The free-to-air broadcast on TeleRadyo Serbisyo resumed via Prime TV on June 1, 2024. On July 20, 2024, TV Patrol Weekend's runtime was reverted to a full hour on Sundays, but later expanded to Saturdays on October 5, 2024.

On September 1, 2024, Alvin Elchico, the weekend edition's longest-serving anchor, was promoted to the weeknight edition. Various male reporters rotated in taking over his role until Adrian Ayalin became his permanent replacement beginning on January 4, 2025, with Hernandez being the lead anchorwoman.

On March 9, TVP's Sunday edition was shortened to 45 minutes due to schedule changes. On May 31, TV Patrol Weekend started to simulcast on DZMM Radyo Patrol 630 and DZMM TeleRadyo for the first time in five years since the shutdown in 2020.

On May 17, 2026, the Sunday edition of TV Patrol Weekend moved to its earliest timeslot yet at 4:30 p.m., as it became the lead-in show to the reformatted primetime musical-variety show ASAP XP, airing at 5:30 p.m., with the Saturday edition of the newscast still airing at 5:45 p.m.

Similar to the weekday version, TV Patrol Weekend would be tapped to provide extended editions during major breaking news. This was first implemented on September 26, 2009 during the onslaught and aftermath of Typhoon Ondoy (Ketsana) with the newscast airing two live hour-long editions at 6:15 PM and 10:45 PM PHT that day. The twi-night broadcast arrangement was repeated the following day at 6:45 PM and 10:45 PM PHT. The longest telecast under such circumstances was made on November 9, 2025 for the coverage of Super Typhoon Uwan. After airing on terrestrial and digital platforms, the program continued for another 90 minutes through ANC and ABS-CBN News' Facebook and YouTube until 8:00 PM PHT.

=== Anchors ===
- Zen Hernandez (2016–present)
- Adrian Ayalin (2025–present)

Substitute anchors

- Johnson Manabat (2022–present)
- Victoria Tulad (2024–present)
- RG Cruz (2024–present)
- Raphael Bosano (2024–present)
- Jeff Canoy (2024–present)

Former anchors

- Alex Santos (2001–2012; as a reporter and/or substitute anchor for Bendijo or Omaga-Diaz, Babao, Failon or de Castro, 2006–2011 as an anchor)
- Alvin Elchico (2011–2024)
- Bernadette Sembrano (2005–2011; as an anchor, 2015 as a substitute anchor for Webb)
- Camilla Kim-Galvez (2004–2011; as a reporter and/or substitute anchor for Oreña-Drilon, Sembrano or Webb)
- Ces Drilon (2001–2017; as a reporter and/or substitute anchor for Sanchez, 2004–2017 substitute anchor for Davila, Sanchez or Sembrano, 2004–2005 as an anchor)
- Denice Dinsay (2025; as a substitute anchor for Hernandez)
- Henry Omaga-Diaz (1991–2001; as a reporter and/or substitute anchor for de Castro; 2004–2006 as an anchor)
- Joyce Balancio (2017–2024; as a reporter and/or substitute anchor for Hernandez)
- Katrina Domingo (2024–25; as a substitute anchor for Hernandez)
- Julius Babao (2003–2021; as a reporter and/or substitute anchor for Omaga-Diaz, Santos or Elchico)
- Mari Kaimo (2004–2007; as a reporter and/or substitute anchor for Omaga-Diaz or Santos)
- Mike Navallo (2022; as a substitute anchor for Elchico)
- Pinky Webb (2001–2015; as a reporter and/or substitute anchor for Davila, Sanchez or Sembrano, 2011–2015 as an anchor)
- Stanley Palisada (2022; as a substitute anchor for Elchico)

== News Patrol ==
News Patrol
- Logo since August 8, 2022
- Genre: News bulletin
- Created by: ABS-CBN Corporation
- Presented by: Various news anchors (Hourly); Denice Dinsay (Primetime, 2020)
- Country of origin: Philippines
- Original language: Filipino

Production
- Production location: Studio 7, ABS-CBN Broadcasting Center
- Camera setup: Single-camera setup
- Running time: 2–10 minutes, hourly 30 minutes (as primetime newscast, 2020)
- Production company: ABS-CBN News and Current Affairs

Original release
- Network: ABS-CBN
- Release: September 5, 2005 – May 5, 2020
- Network: TeleRadyo
- Release: May 8 – June 12, 2020
- Network: Kapamilya Channel; ANC
- Release: June 15, 2020 – present
- Network: A2Z
- Release: June 20, 2022 – present
- Network: Jeepney TV
- Release: January 2023 – December 22, 2023
- Network: All TV
- Release: January 3, 2026 – present

News Patrol is a Philippine television newscast broadcast by ABS-CBN, ANC and Kapamilya Channel. It aired from September 5, 2005 to present, replacing ABS-CBN News Advisory. It also served as the main newscast for Kapamilya Channel from June 15 to July 24, 2020, temporarily replacing TV Patrol at the former ABS-CBN timeslot.

=== Airing history ===
==== As an hourly news bulletin ====
News Patrol premiered in 2004 as a 30-minute news bulletin during the network's morning show Magandang Umaga, Bayan. It ran twice at 6:00 AM and 7:00 AM, hosted by Katherine de Castro and Julius Babao. The name was later repurposed into ABS-CBN's main top-of-the-hour newscast, replacing ABS-CBN News Advisory on September 5, 2005. Upon Magandang Umaga, Bayan's rebrand as Magandang Umaga, Pilipinas, the program's morning bulletin became Patrol Express.

In 2006, News Patrol became the first Philippine news program to broadcast the victory of the First Philippine Mount Everest Expedition.

On April 1, 2018, News Patrol switched to high definition format, along with other network's main channel's news programs.

On April 9, 2020, News Patrol was repurposed as special evening newscasts during the Paschal Triduum and the height of the COVID-19 pandemic.

On May 5, 2020, News Patrol aired its last bulletin on ABS-CBN after the network was forced to cease and desist its free TV broadcasting operations given by the order of the NTC due to the expiration of the network's legislative franchise to operate the day before.

On May 8, 2020, News Patrol migrated to TeleRadyo, The Filipino Channel, and social media platforms such as Facebook, YouTube, and iWantTFC. Some regional newscasts also began to air live on their respective Facebook pages the following day.

On October 9, 2021, Pia Gutierrez left the Saturday News Patrol bulletins ahead of her promotion to become co-anchor of The World Tonight. She was replaced by Willard Cheng in November 2021.

On June 20, 2022, News Patrol alternately aired on A2Z in place of the ZOE-produced Ulat A2Z, broadcasting every weekday afternoon, marking its return to free-to-air television after two years.

On December 2, 2024, News Patrol started airing on ANC.

On January 3, 2026, News Patrol expanded to All TV, marking its return to channels 2 and 16 (Mega Manila) and regional channels after more than 5 years.

On May 1, 2026, News Patrol's 2 weekday editions ended on ANC and were replaced by the revival of ANC Headlines.

==== As a primetime newscast ====
On June 15, 2020, News Patrol returned via Kapamilya Channel as a temporary 30-minute primetime newscast instead of airing the two-hour editions of TV Patrol which had been carried on ANC, TeleRadyo and Cine Mo!. ANC and former S+A news presenter Denice Dinsay anchored the primetime newscast. However, this arrangement ended on July 24 as TV Patrol was added to the lineup on July 27. News Patrol was then reverted to being an hourly news bulletin.

=== Anchors ===
- Lyza Aquino
- Adrian Ayalin
- Raphael Bosano
- Migs Bustos
- Jeff Canoy
- Katrina Domingo
- Johnson Manabat
- Raine Musngi
- Michelle Ong
- Stanley Palisada
- Victoria Tulad

Former anchors

- RG Cruz
- Denice Dinsay
- Jorge Cariño
- Bianca Dava
- Katrina Domingo
- Jasmin Romero
- Willard Cheng
- Jing Castañeda
- Gigi Grande
- Henry Omaga-Diaz
- Pia Gutierrez
- Mike Navallo
- Noli de Castro (as anchor for special editions)
- Ted Failon (as anchor for special editions)
- Korina Sanchez (as anchor for special editions)
- Karen Davila
- Julius Babao
- Ces Drilon
- Atom Araullo
- Cheryl Cosim
- Dindo Amparo
- Sol Aragones
- Jacque Manabat
- Jay Ruiz
- Nikki de Guzman
- Maan Macapagal
- Alvin Elchico (as anchor for special Black Saturday newscast)

=== Regional editions ===
Aside from the national edition, selected regional stations carried localized versions, either as a complement to the existing local version of TV Patrol or as a preparation for the launch of a new one (as was the case with Batangas in late 2008, before the launch of TV Patrol Southern Tagalog in February 2009)

==== Final (defunct) ====
- News Patrol North Luzon (Baguio, Dagupan, Laoag, Isabela and Pampanga)
- Batangas News Patrol (Batangas, 2008–2009)
- News Patrol Bicol (Naga and Legazpi)
- News Patrol Palawan (Palawan)
- News Patrol Iloilo/Panay (Iloilo)
- News Patrol Negros (Bacolod)
- News Patrol Central Visayas (Cebu and Dumaguete)
- News Patrol Eastern Visayas (Tacloban)
- News Patrol North Mindanao (Cagayan de Oro, Dipolog, Iligan and Butuan)
- News Patrol Southern Mindanao (Davao)
- News Patrol South Central Mindanao (General Santos and Cotabato)
- News Patrol Chavacano (Zamboanga)

== TV Patrol Express ==
TV Patrol Express
- Logo since January 2, 2024
- Genre: News broadcasting
- Created by: ABS-CBN Corporation
- Presented by: Jeff Canoy; Denice Dinsay
- Country of origin: Philippines
- Original language: Filipino

Production
- Production locations: ABS-CBN Newsroom, ABS-CBN Broadcasting Center
- Camera setup: Multi-camera setup
- Running time: 15–20 minutes
- Production company: ABS-CBN News and Current Affairs

Original release
- Network: Kapamilya Channel (Note: The series also airs on its primary networks All TV (through its ABS-CBN licensing) and Kapamilya Channel as well as other affiliate channels and online platforms via Kapamilya Online Live through YouTube. It is also available on-demand via iWant.)
- Release: January 2, 2024 – present

TV Patrol Express started as a digital-only spinoff of TV Patrol produced by ABS-CBN News, airing weekdays at 5:00 p.m. PHT on the network's YouTube and Facebook platforms. It premiered on January 2, 2024, anchored by Jeff Canoy and Denice Dinsay. The program offers a concise overview of significant national headlines, serving as a pre-show to the flagship TV Patrol newscast.

On June 21, 2024, Jeff Canoy announced that TV Patrol Express would air on free-to-air, cable and satellite television effective July 1 on Kapamilya Channel, A2Z, All TV, and Jeepney TV. The newscast aired for 15-minutes, slightly longer than its previous airtime of 5 to 10 minutes, and move to its 5:30 p.m. timeslot (PHT). By December 2, TV Patrol Express would also begin simulcasting on ANC until it quietly ended on July 31, 2026.

From March 10 to June 27, 2025, it moved to an earlier timeslot at 4:45 to 5:00 p.m., and fully debuted on Kapamilya Online Live after 6 months since its first broadcast for special news coverage on July 22, 2024. By June 30, it returned to its original timeslot of 5:30 to 5:45 p.m.

Outside its purpose as pre-show of the main newscast, TV Patrol Express often serves as the rolling news coverage of ABS-CBN News on significant news events airing on its digital platforms – with occasional simulcast on ANC, including the monsoon-induced flooding in Mega Manila of July 2025, state funeral of Nora Aunor, the death of Pope Francis and its subsequent conclave, among others.

=== Anchors ===
- Jeff Canoy (2024–present)
- Denice Dinsay (2024–present)

=== Substitute anchors ===
- Pia Gutierrez (2024–25)
- Katrina Domingo (2024–present)
- Johnson Manabat (2024–present)
- Adrian Ayalin (2024–present)
- Bettina Magsaysay (2024)
- Victoria Tulad (2024–present)
- Stanley Palisada (2024–present)
- Andrea Taguines (2024–present)
- Bianca Dava (2025)
- Lyza Aquino (2025–present)

== TV Patrol Regional ==
TV Patrol Regional
- Genre: News broadcasting Regional newscast
- Created by: ABS-CBN Corporation
- Presented by: Annie Perez various anchors (1988–2020)
- Country of origin: Philippines
- Original languages: Cebuano; Various regional dialects (1988–2020)

Production
- Camera setup: Single-camera setup
- Running time: 15 minutes (2025–2026); 30–40 minutes (1988–2020)
- Production companies: ABS-CBN News and Current Affairs; ABS-CBN Regional

Original release
- Network: ABS-CBN Regional stations
- Release: August 29, 1988 – August 28, 2020
- Network: ABS-CBN News YouTube Channel
- Release: November 2, 2025 – May 10, 2026
- Network: Kapamilya Channel; A2Z
- Release: November 16, 2025 – May 10, 2026
- Network: All TV
- Release: January 4 – May 10, 2026

From 1988 to 2020, the regional editions of the newscast that are delivered in other Philippine languages, collectively credited as TV Patrol Regional, were broadcast on all ABS-CBN Regional stations nationwide, with simulcast on the network's four provincial Radyo Patrol AM Radio stations, DYAB TeleRadyo Cebu and selected MOR FM radio stations.

All regional editions aired in the late afternoon until ABS-CBN ceased free TV and radio operations on May 5, 2020, with selected editions simulcast over The Filipino Channel for overseas viewers. Several newscasts were also aired nationwide from August 2016 to January 2018 on the ABS-CBN Regional Channel via Sky Cable, Destiny Cable, and Sky Direct. The ABS-CBN Regional YouTube page also includes archived videos of past editions for those who have not watched the program, as well as for overseas viewers.

On May 8, 2020, the regional editions resumed broadcasts through their respective Facebook pages and the ABS-CBN Regional YouTube channel. However, on July 15, ABS-CBN announced that the company would go into retrenchment on August 31 in light of the denial of its bid for a legislative franchise, laying off much of its employees. It was further revealed on July 17, during an interview on Failon Ngayon sa TeleRadyo that the regional division of ABS-CBN News would fold after regular business hours on the said retrenchment date. Included in the shutdown is the halt of all its regional programs and their respective TV Patrol editions, with their last broadcasts aired on August 28, 2020.

On October 28, 2025, ABS-CBN Regional announced the revival of TV Patrol Regional on November 2, albeit as a digital-only weekly program focusing on news in the Visayas area and delivered in Cebuano language. After 2 weeks, the program started airing on Kapamilya Channel and A2Z, before TV Patrol Weekend, and later premiered on All TV on January 4, 2026. The newscast aired its final episode on May 10, 2026, to give way for the new timeslot of TV Patrol Weekend, and the premiere of ASAP XP on May 17.

=== Defunct editions ===
- TV Patrol Bicol (1996–2020)
- TV Patrol North Luzon (Ilocos, Cordillera, Cagayan Valley, and Central Luzon regions, 1995–2020) (renamed as Luzon Headlines (RNG Luzon))
- TV Patrol Palawan (1997–2006, 2011–2020) (renamed as Alpha News Philippines)
- TV Patrol Southern Tagalog (Calabarzon and Mimaropa regions except Palawan, 2009–2020)
- TV Patrol Central Visayas (1988–2020)
- TV Patrol Eastern Visayas (1998–2020)
- TV Patrol Negros (1988–2020)
- TV Patrol Panay (1998–2020)
- TV Patrol Chavacano (1995–2020)
- TV Patrol North Mindanao (Northern Mindanao and Caraga regions, 1995–2020)
- TV Patrol South Central Mindanao (Soccsksargen and Bangsamoro regions, 1996–2020)
- TV Patrol Southern Mindanao (1989–2020)

==== Prior regional editions ====
- TV Patrol Cagayan de Oro/Iligan/Nuebe Patrol (relaunched as TV Patrol Northern Mindanao then TV Patrol North Mindanao)
- TV Patrol Naga/Legazpi (merged into TV Patrol Bicol)
- TV Patrol Cebu/Dumaguete (merged into TV Patrol Central Visayas)
- TV Patrol Tuguegarao/Isabela (merged into TV Patrol Cagayan Valley, later merged with TV Patrol North Luzon)
- TV Patrol Baguio (relaunched as TV Patrol Northern Luzon, later TV Patrol North Luzon)
- TV Patrol Laoag (relaunched as TV Patrol Ilocos, later merged with TV Patrol North Luzon)
- TV Patrol Iloilo (relaunched as TV Patrol Panay)
- TV Patrol 4 (renamed as TV Patrol Western Visayas, then TV Patrol Bacolod, until renamed TV Patrol Negros)
- TV Patrol Western Visayas (now comprising TV Patrol Negros and TV Patrol Panay)
- TV Patrol Butuan (relaunched as TV Patrol Caraga, later merged to TV Patrol North Mindanao)
- TV Patrol Mindanao (scaled down as TV Patrol Davao, then reverted to its original title, until renamed TV Patrol Southern Mindanao)
- TV Patrol Dagupan (relaunched as TV Patrol North Central Luzon, later merged with TV Patrol North Luzon)
- Palawan TV Patrol (relaunched as TV Patrol Palawan)
- TV Patrol Zamboanga (relaunched as TV Patrol Chavacano)
- TV Patrol Cotabato (relaunched as TV Patrol Central Mindanao, later merged to TV Patrol South Central Mindanao)
- TV Patrol General Santos (relaunched as TV Patrol Socsksargen and later as TV Patrol South Central Mindanao)
- TV Patrol Pagadian (relaunched as TV Patrol Northwestern Mindanao, then replaced by Nuebe Patrol and later defunct)
- TV Patrol Pampanga (axed in 2018; scaled down to short News Patrol Kapampangan bulletin opt-outs, later merged with TV Patrol North Luzon)
- TV Patrol Tacloban (relaunched as TV Patrol Eastern Visayas)
- TV Patrol Northern Samar (defunct)

== Junior Patrol ==
Junior Patrol
- Genre: Children's news program
- Created by: ABS-CBN Corporation
- Presented by: Doland Castro
- Country of origin: Philippines
- Original language: Filipino

Production
- Production company: ABS-CBN News and Current Affairs

Original release
- Network: ABS-CBN
- Release: May 21, 1990 – July 26, 1992

Junior Patrol is a Philippine children's news broadcast by ABS-CBN, airing from May 21, 1990 to July 26, 1992, and was replaced by Showbiz Lingo. It served as a spin-off of TV Patrol for children and pre-teens.

One of the show's hosts was Doland Castro who later became senior field reporter for ABS-CBN News and Current Affairs. Other members of Junior Patrol were Rowena Samala, Mary Ann Abacan, Gerald Salcedo, Marc Anthony Almajose, Sheila Aligora, Marvin Escalona, Lee Britanico and Willie Marcelino.

=== Final anchors ===
- Doland Castro
- Rowena Samala
- Mary Ann Abacan
- Gerald Salcedo
- Marc Anthony Almajose
- Sheila Aligora
- Marvin Escalona
- Lee Britanico
- Willie Marcelino

== Reception ==
In October 1988, early in the program's run, Meg Mendoza of the Manila Standard criticized the show's format, stating that "we still prefer [GMA Balita] since we can't stand the blood and gore being shown.... Sensationalism may be good for the ratings but there's no substitute to honest and intelligent reporting."

In 1989, poet and literary critic Virgilio S. Almario was critical of TV Patrol's use of "siyokoy" words, Filipino loanwords from the Spanish or English language that are formed through a misunderstanding of Spanish grammar. As examples, Almario highlighted the use of the words "aspeto," "parliyamento," "pesante," and "konsernado," which he respectively corrected as "aspekto," "parlamento," "magsasaka," "paisano" or "magbubukid," and "konsernido." However, he still commends the program for "passionately" delivering news in the Filipino language.

== See also ==
- List of accolades received by TV Patrol
