= Henry Omaga-Diaz =

Filipino broadcaster (born 1961)

- Born: Henry Omaga; January 9, 1961 (age 65); Tabaco, Albay, Philippines
- Other name: H.O.D.
- Education: Lyceum of the Philippines University (BA)
- Occupation: Journalist
- Years active: 1979–present
- Employers: Radyo Veritas (1979–91); ABS-CBN (1991–2024)
- Spouse: Gigi Cabigon (m. 1998)
- Children: 1

YouTube information
- Channel: Henry Omaga Diaz VLOGS
- Years active: 2021–present
- Genres: vlogs, news
- Subscribers: 30.3k
- Views: 796.7k
- Last updated: June 2, 2025

Henry Omaga-Diaz (Tagalog: [ˈhɛnɾi ʔɔˈmaga ˈdɪas]; born Henry Omaga; January 9, 1961) is a Filipino journalist, news anchor, radio newscaster and commentator. He was the news anchor of TV Patrol and Bandila on ABS-CBN, where he was widely known, and various radio programs on DZMM and DWPM.

== Background ==
Omaga-Diaz came from the town of Guinobatan, Albay, but was raised and grew up in Manila. He is a graduate of BA Journalism from the Lyceum of the Philippines University.

== Career ==
Omaga-Diaz began his journalism career as a news writer for Radio Veritas 846 from 1979 to 1991. He later joined ABS-CBN's radio station DZMM in 1991 as a Radyo Patrol reporter before becoming a field reporter on television. In 1996, he became an anchor of The Weekend News, serving as such until 2004. In 2001, he became an anchor for ABS-CBN's flagship evening news program TV Patrol, serving on the weeknight edition from 2001 to 2003, the weekend edition from 2004 to 2006, and again on the weeknight edition from 2020 to 2024. He also anchored the late-night newscast Bandila from 2006 to 2010.

Omaga-Diaz left ABS-CBN in 2024 to migrate to Canada, where he would continue his journalism career.

== Filmography ==
=== Television ===
Year	Title	Role
1996–2004	The Weekend News	Anchor
1991–2001	TV Patrol	Reporter / Substitute Anchor
2001–2003; 2020–2024	TV Patrol	Anchor
1997–2001	Hoy Gising!	Host
2001–2006	Magandang Gabi... Bayan	Host
2004–2006	TV Patrol Sabado/Linggo	Anchor
2006–2009	XXX: Exklusibong, Explosibong, Exposé	Host
2006–2010	Bandila	Anchor
2009–2014	Radyo Patrol Balita Alas-Kwatro Sabado	Anchor
2009–2014	Pasada Sais Trenta Sabado	Anchor
2014–2023	Omaga-Diaz Reports	Anchor
2022	Pepsi, Where's My Jet?	Interviewee
2023–2024	HOD: Headline of the Day (formerly On Point)	Anchor

== Radio ==
Year	Title	Role
2009–2014	Radyo Patrol Balita Alas-Kwatro Sabado	Anchor
2009–2014	Pasada Sais Trenta Sabado	Anchor
2014–2020	Omaga-Diaz Report	Anchor
2023–2024	HOD: Headline of the Day (formerly On Point)	Anchor

== Recognition ==
Omaga-Diaz was awarded a spot among the Ten Outstanding Media Personalities by the International Media Associates, Inc.

== Personal life ==
Omaga-Diaz married to Gigi Cabigon and has a son and three grandchildren. His family currently lives in Canada.
