= Karen Davila =

Filipino journalist (born 1970)

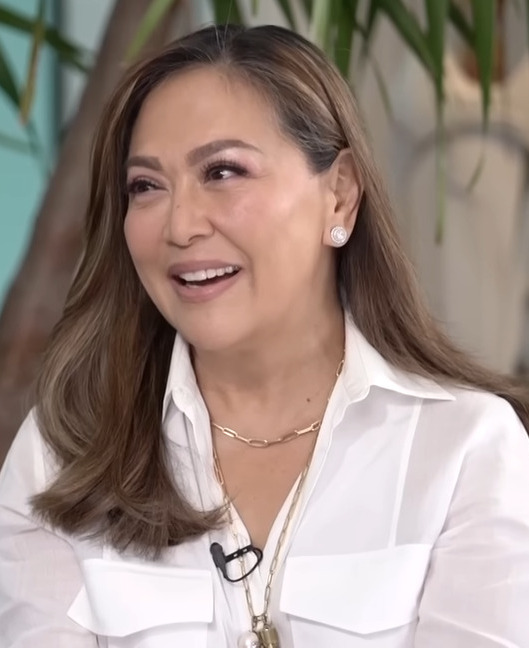
- Davila in 2022
- Born: Kristin Karen Lising Davila; November 21, 1970 (age 55) (Note: A post in 2021 confirmed Davila's birthday as November 21, while another post in 2020 confirmed that she celebrated her 50th birthday in 2020, thus making 1970 as her birth year.); Manila, Philippines
- Education: University of the Philippines Diliman
- Occupations: Broadcast journalist; television news anchor; radio presenter; newspaper columnist
- Years active: 1994–present
- Spouse: Daryl Jake "DJ" Sta. Ana (m. 2001)
- Children: 2

YouTube information
- Channel: Karen Davila
- Years active: 2021–present
- Genres: Life stories, motivational stories, guest interviews
- Subscribers: 2.16 million
- Views: 328 million views
- Last updated: 6 September 2024

Kristin Karen Lising Davila-Sta. Ana (Tagalog pronunciation: [ˌdaː.bɪˈla]; born November 21, 1970), is a Filipino broadcast journalist. She has been the anchor or host of multiple programs under ABS-CBN's News and Current Affairs division, including Bandila, My Puhunan: Kaya Mo!, and TV Patrol.

== Early life ==
Davila went to high school at the Colegio San Agustin – Makati, where she was batchmates with Kris Aquino and Pinky Webb. She took a degree of Bachelor of Arts major in Mass Communication at the University of the Philippines Diliman in Quezon City.

== Achievements ==
As a professional journalist, Davila has received awards internationally, including an award from the New York Festival and the Ten Outstanding Young Men Awards for Broadcast Journalism in 2008. She has more than 20 awards in the professional journalism field from both local and international organizations. She was also recognized by the Philippine Senate as one of the Outstanding Women in the Nation's Service (TOWNS). Esquire magazine named her the "Sexiest Woman Alive" in 2015, citing beauty and brains as the sheer formula for the declaration.

In August 2023, Davila was appointed as the first UN Women National Goodwill Ambassador for the Philippines, with the goal of furthering a range of objectives, including the promotion of gender equality and women's empowerment, as well as combating climate change.

== Personal life ==
Davila is married to DJ Sta. Ana since July 22, 2001, with two sons: David and Lucas. She is an advocate for people with special needs, children's rights, government transparency, and journalism. Karen Davila and her husband are evangelical Christians.

Davila announced on January 9, 2022, during her conversation with Filipino physician Tony Leachon in her ANC program, Headstart, that she and her family caught COVID-19, although she indicated that they were recovering from the disease. On January 15, she posted on Instagram that she and her fellow TV Patrol anchors Alvin Elchico and Gretchen Fullido have survived COVID-19. On her 52nd birthday, she revealed on Instagram that she had recovered from COVID-19 for a second time.

== Filmography ==
=== Television ===
Year	Title	Role
1995–2000	Brigada Siete	Reporter
1995–1998	Saksi	Anchor
1998	Saksi	Reporter
1999–2000	Extra Extra	Host
2000	Frontpage: Ulat ni Mel Tiangco	Substitute anchor
2000–2003	ABS-CBN Headlines	Anchor
2003–2004	ABS-CBN Insider	Anchor
2000–2010	The Correspondents	Host
2004–2005	Y Speak	Host
2004–2010; 2021–present	TV Patrol World/TV Patrol	Anchor
2006–2008	XXX: Exklusibong, Explosibong, Exposé	Host
2008–2009	Wonder Mom	Host
2010–2020	Bandila	Anchor
2010–present	Headstart with Karen Davila	Host
2012–2013	Engkwentro	Host
2013–2015; 2015–2020	My Puhunan	Host
2015	3-in-1	Host
2017	Home Sweetie Home	Guest
2021	The World Tonight	Anchor
2022	Korina Interviews	Guest
2023–present	My Puhunan: Kaya Mo!	Host

== Radio ==
Year	Title	Role
2000–2018	Pasada Sais Trenta	Anchor
