= Bernadette Sembrano =

Filipino journalist (born 1976)

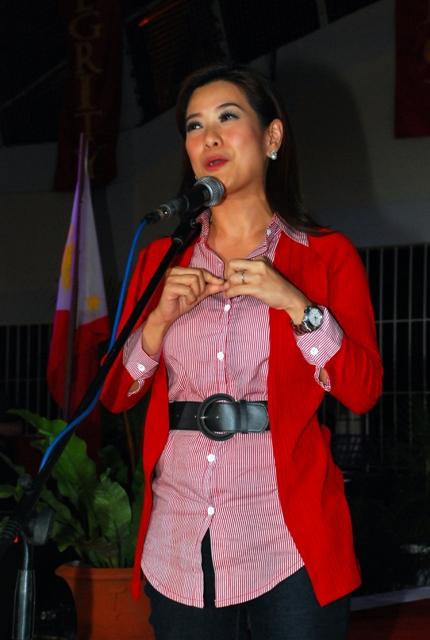
- Sembrano during the 9th Gawad Tanglaw as she receives the Best TV Anchor award
- Born: Bernadette Lorraine Palisada Dominguez Sembrano; February 18, 1976 (age 50); Quezon City, Metro Manila, Philippines
- Education: University of the Philippines Diliman, (BS)
- Occupations: Reporter; journalist; radio broadcaster; host; musician; author
- Years active: 1997–present
- Employers: IBC (1997–1998); GMA Network (1998–2004); ABS-CBN (2004–present)
- Television: TV Patrol (co-anchor, since 2015)
- Spouse: Emilio Aguinaldo IV (m. 2008)

Bernadette Lorraine Palisada Dominguez Sembrano-Aguinaldo (Tagalog: [pɐliˈsada dɔˈmɪŋgɛs sɛmˈbɾanɔ ʔagiˈnaldɔ]; born February 18, 1976) is a Filipina broadcast journalist, television presenter, news anchor, musician, author, and former field reporter. She is the co-anchor of the ABS-CBN's evening news program TV Patrol.

== Career ==
=== Newscasting career with IBC 13 and GMA 7 days ===
Sembrano started with IBC as a newscaster in 1997 when she joined with GMA Network in 1998. She was anchored the late-night weekend edition newscast GMA Network News and also as an alternate anchor for Saksi, and the public service as first wish' oriented show Wish Ko Lang!. After walking out in an episode of Saksi in September 2003, she was suspended by GMA, and was later terminated on December 20, 2003, but she continued to work with Wish Ko Lang! and GMA Network until February 14, 2004, after which she was replaced by Vicky Morales who took over as host.

=== Career at ABS-CBN ===
After a long hiatus, Sembrano had already given up on her career due to the competition from her former network.

After she got suspended by GMA Network, she transferred to ABS-CBN in 2004, where she hosted the public service show Lukso ng Dugo, an OFW Drama Anthology entitled Nagmamahal, Kapamilya, and the morning show Magandang Umaga, Pilipinas. She also served as a correspondent for ABS-CBN's longest investigative journalism show, The Correspondents.

Sembrano was also a co-anchor on TV Patrol Weekend (previously TV Patrol Sabado/Linggo) from 2005 to 2011, replacing Ces Drilon and she was replaced by Pinky Webb, a newscaster on DZMM programs– Radyo Patrol Balita Alas-Dose, Gising Pilipinas, and Radyo Patrol Balita Alas-Kwatro –alongside Alex Santos), and host of Salamat Dok, Umagang Kay Ganda, and other ABS-CBN News programs. She later anchored the morning program Lingkod Kapamilya on DZMM (until 2020) and TeleRadyo until 2023.

On August 3, 2015, she was named as the co-anchor of the weeknight edition of TV Patrol, which replaced Korina Sanchez, after a decade of being in the weekend edition of the said newscast. She later left Umagang Kay Ganda on October 2 to focus on her duties as a TV Patrol anchor. When DWPM Radyo 630 was launched on June 30, 2023 as the successor of DZMM, she began anchoring the public service radio program Tatak: Serbisyo alongside Winnie Cordero, marking her return to AM radio after three years. On July 1, 2024, she began anchoring Klinika 630 alongside Dr. Dennis Ngo until May 30, 2025, due to the relaunch of DZMM a day prior.

She is a newscaster, television host, and correspondent for ABS-CBN News and Current Affairs.

=== Music career ===
On August 17, 2020, Sembrano was credited as co-lyricist alongside Star Music creative director Jonathan Manalo in the song "Ang Sa Iyo ay Akin" by Aegis, the theme song of the Philippine drama television series of the same name. In November 2020, she wrote and recorded the song "Yakapin ang Pasko," her very first song as singer.

On May 5, 2021, one year after the ABS-CBN shutdown, Sembrano released her second single "Yakap", which she composed and performed. It was revealed that she initially planned to release the single in 2020, but Manalo suggested that the single be released on the network's first anniversary of being off-air instead.

== Personal life ==
In June 2008, she married her boyfriend Emilio "Orange" Aguinaldo IV, the great-grandson of the first President of the Philippines, Emilio Aguinaldo. She suffered a miscarriage in 2018, as she revealed to have reproduction issues.

In July 2011, Sembrano announced that she has Bell's palsy and underwent therapy.

=== Education ===
Sembrano graduated high school from Angelicum School (now Angelicum College), a private Catholic school in Quezon City, Philippines. She earned a Bachelor of Science degree in business administration from University of the Philippines Diliman.

== Discography ==
=== Singles ===
- Yakapin ang Pasko - 2020 (under Star Music)
- Yakap - 2021 (under Star Music)
- B Happy - 2022 (under Star Music)
- Bubog - 2023 (Independent)

== Filmography ==
=== Television ===
Year	Title	Role
1997–1998	CTN Midnite	News Anchor
1998–2002	GMA Network News	News Anchor
1999–2003	The Probe Team	Producer / Reporter
2002–2004	Wish Ko Lang!	Host
2003	Saksi	Substitute anchor
2003	K! The 1 Million Peso Videoke Challenge	Guest contestant
2004–2005	ABS-CBN Insider	News Anchor
2004	Y Speak	Guest judge
2005–2011	TV Patrol Sabado/Linggo/Weekend	News Anchor
2005–2007	Magandang Umaga, Pilipinas	Host / Anchor
2007–2011; 2011–2015	Umagang Kay Ganda	Host / Anchor
2011–2015	Top Story	News Anchor
2015–present	TV Patrol	News Anchor
2007–2010	The Correspondents	Host
2010–2020	Salamat Dok	Host
2017–2023	Lingkod Kapamilya sa DZMM/TeleRadyo	Host
2023–2026	Tao Po!	Host
2023–2024	Tatak: Serbisyo	Host
2024–2025	Klinika 630	Host

== Radio ==
Year	Title
2009–2011	Gising Pilipinas
2011–2017	Radyo Patrol Balita Alas-Kwatro
2017–2020	Lingkod Kapamilya sa DZMM
2023–2024	Tatak: Serbisyo
2024–2025	Klinika 630

== Awards and citations ==
- Students' Choice of Female News and Public Affairs Host: 5th USTv Students Choice Awards
- Best TV Anchor, 9th Gawad Tanglaw Awards
- Most Admired Female TV Personality (from 2005 to 2010), Anak TV Seal Awards
- One of Best Morning Show Hosts for Umagang Kay Ganda (from 2008 to 2011), Star Awards for TV
- 2012 Anak TV Makabata Star Awardee (Female TV Personalities)
- Best Public Service Program Host (Salamat Dok) - 2012 6th Gandingan Awards
- (Best Health Show Host), 3rd EdukCircle Awards
- Best TV Public Service Host award for Salamat Dok, 21st Golden Dove Awards of the Kapisanan ng Broadkaster ng Pilipinas (KBP)
- Female Broadcast Journalist of the Year for TV - Rotary Club of Manila Journalism Awards 2014
- (Best Health Show Host), 4th EdukCircle Awards 2014
- Best TV Anchor (Dateline Philippines) - 13th Gawad Tanglaw 2015
- Best Female Morning Host (Umagang Kay Ganda) - 2016 Paragala Awards
- Best Female News Anchor - (TV Patrol) - Golden Laurel LPU Batangas Media Awards 2017

== Published works ==
- When Bad News Is Good News: Stories To Keep Your Hope Alive (Feast Books; September 15, 2023) ISBN 978-9710072736
