= List of programs aired by DZMM/DZMM TeleRadyo =

Below is a partial list of shows that were previously aired of DZMM Radyo Patrol 630/DWPM Radyo 630 and DZMM TeleRadyo/TeleRadyo Serbisyo. For the currently programs see, list of programs broadcast by DZMM/DZMM TeleRadyo.

== Previously aired programs ==
- #NoFilter (2019–20)^{18}
- A.M.Y. – About Me and You (2004–10)^{18}
- A Night at the Opera^{7}
- Abogado de Kampanilya (1992–2004)^{1}
- Absolute Music^{7}
- All Aboard, Pinoy Abroad (2008–11)^{18}
- Ako Ang Simula (2012–13)^{8}
- Aksyon DOLE sa DZMM (2025)^{18}
- Among My Souvenir^{6}
- ANC sa DZMM TeleRadyo (2020)^{8}
- ANC sa TeleRadyo (2020, 2021–23)^{9}
- Ang Buhay Nga Naman^{4}
- Ang mga Payo ni Compañero (1986–2000)^{1}
- Ang Silabis^{4}
- Ang Sitrhis^{4}
- Ang Tinig Nyo (2023–25)^{210}
- Anggulo ng mga Report (1999–2000)^{1}
- Aprub Yan! (2023–2026)^{12810}
- At the Breakfast Table^{3}
- Awit ng mga Pusong Sawi^{3}
- Awit Tawanan (1997–2001)^{1}
- Bago 'Yan Ah! (1997–2013)^{18}
- Bal Domingo Files (1993–2001)^{1}
- Balitalakay (1986–97)^{1}
- Bandila sa DZMM (2006–11, 2017–19)^{18}
- Bantay Kalikasan (2000–01)^{1}
- Barangay Showdown (2004–06)^{1}
- Basta Ikaw^{5}
- Batang Balunan^{4}
- Batas (2000–05)^{1}
- Bida Konsyumer (2020–23)^{9}
- Big Four^{5}
- Bravo Express (1989–99)^{1}
- Buhay at Kalusugan (2026)
- Buhay at Kalusugan (2003–05)^{1}
- Buhay, Buhay, atbp. (1990–2005)^{1}
- Business Above Usual (2020–21)^{9}
- Calvento Files sa DZMM (1995–2000)^{1}
- Careful, Careful sa DZMM (1996–2000)^{1}
- Chamber Music^{7}
- CHInoyTV (2020; during the COVID-19 pandemic)^{8}
- Chismax: Chismis to the Max (2009–20)^{18}
- Coffee News^{6}
- Compañero y Compañera (1999–2003)^{1}
- Concerto^{7}
- Cristy Per Minute (radio edition) (2003–05)^{1}
- Cutie Pie^{3}
- Darigold Jamboree^{4}
- Dear Ate Gel (1999–2002)^{1}
- Dear Bobby^{3}
- Dear Kuya Cesar (1990–2004)^{1}
- Dear Tiya Dely (1986–87)^{14}
- Dely and Eddie^{4}
- Diskarte (2022–23)^{9}
- Diwa ng Pag-asa^{4}
- Diwang Kayumanggi^{3}
- DocuCentral Presents (2019)^{18}
- Dos por Dos (2000–20)^{189}
  - Main afternoon edition (2006–20)
  - Morning edition (2000–07; 2011–13)
- Dr. Love: Always and Forever (2012–17)^{18}
- Dr. Love Music Show (2011–12)^{18}
- Dr. Love Radio Show (1997–2022)^{189}
  - Weekday edition (1997–2020)
  - Weekend edition (2020–22)
- Dra. Bles @ Ur Serbis (2001–20)^{189}
- DZBC Jukebox^{3}
- DZMM Balita (1986–2001)^{1}
- DZMM Breaking News (2007–2020)^{18}
- DZMM Drama Theater (1986–2003)^{1}
- DZMM Live (1991–2005) ^{1}
- DZMM Network News
- DZMM News^{7}
- DZMM TeleRadyo Live (2007–2020)^{18}
- Don Enrique^{3}
- DZQL News^{6}
- DZQL Presents^{6}
- DZQL Record Bar^{6}
- Ely Morning (1986–95)^{1}
- Exodus (1986–2004)^{1}
- Fastbreak (2014–20)^{18}
- Failon Ngayon sa DZMM (2011–20)^{18}
- Failon Ngayon sa TeleRadyo (2020)^{18}
- Fidetis^{4}
- Fire Prevention Program^{5}
- Garantisadong Balita (2013–20)^{189}
- Gabay Kalusugan (2004–10)^{18}
- Ginoong Itim^{3}
- Ginoong Romantico^{3}
- Good Job (2019–23)^{189}
- Good Morning Pilipinas! (1986–90)^{1}
- Good Vibes (2017–20)^{189}
- Great Eastern Radio^{5}
- Guess the Song of the World^{3}
- Healthy Sabado (2018–20)^{18}
- Halina't Makinig^{3}
- Harmony Encores^{6}
- Haybol Pinoy (1992–2005, 2018–19)^{18}
- Headline Pilipinas (2016–23)^{189}
  - Saturday Edition (2020–21)^{189}
  - Sunday Edition (2020)^{18}
- Headline Ngayon Express (2023)^{210}
- Headline Ngayon Weekend (2023–25)^{12810}
- Himig Kano^{3}
- Himig Sa Hating Gabi^{5}
- HOD: Headlines of the Day (2023–24)^{210}
- Hoy, Gising! (1990–95)^{1}
- Himala sa Fatima (October 13, 2019)^{8}
- HaPinay (2020–23)^{9}
- Hatinggabi sa DZMM^{18}
- Hour at Enchantment^{7}
- Ikaw at ang Batas (1993–2003)^{1}
- Ikaw sa Likod ng mga Awit (2006–07)^{18}
- Innermind on Radio (1992–2013)^{18}
- Ipaglaban Mo! (2017–21)^{89}
- Isyu Ngayon (2004–06)^{1}
- It's Showtime with Billy Balbastro (1992–2008)^{18}
- Ito ang ABS^{3}
- Ito ang Maynila^{4}
- Ito ang Radyo Patrol (2002–20)^{18}
- Jeep ni Erap (1995–2000)^{1}
- Johnny^{4}
- Juander Titser (2020–21)^{9}
- Johnson, Ikwento Mo (2023–25)^{210}
- Ka-Date sa DZMM (2010–13)^{18}
- Kahapon Lamang^{4}
- Kalatungan^{4}
- Kamusta Kayo^{4}
- Kamusta mga Bisaya (1996–2004)^{1}
- Kapamilya Daily Mass (2020–23)^{189}
- Kapamilya Holy Week Recollection (2020; 2021–22)^{189}
- Kapamilya Konek (2013–23)^{189}
- Kape at Salita (2018–21)^{189}
- Kapilas ng Puso^{4}
- Kasalo (2023–24)^{210}
- Kaserbisyo Balita (2024–25)^{210}
- Kaserbisyo Flash Report (2024–25)^{210}
- Kaserbisyo Special Coverage (2024–25)^{210}
- Katapat: Mayor Fred Lim sa DZMM (2004–10)^{18}
- Kawikaan Mo Kami^{5}
- Keyboard Music^{7}
- Kitang-Kita ang Kita (1996–2000)^{1}
- Klinika 630 (2024–25)^{210}
- Knowledge Power (1986–2007)^{1}
- Konsyumer Atbp. (2005–20)^{189}
- Konek Todo (2018–19)^{18}
- Kontrapelo (2003–05)^{1}
- Korina sa Umaga (2000–04)^{1}
- Krusada (2011–12)^{8}
- Kuha Mo! (2017–20)^{89}
- Kumustar Ka (2021–23)^{9}
- Kung May Relos, may Razon (1999–2002)^{1}
- Kuntil Butil sa Pananghalian^{3}
- Kwento Nights (2025–2026)^{18}
- Kuwentuhang Lokal (2020–21)^{189}
- Laging May Umaga^{4}
- Lakas ng Siyensya (2022)^{9}
- Lamplighter World Peace Mission^{3}
- Laugh Out Loud (2007–10)^{18}
- Let's Hear It Again^{6}
- Light Moments (2008–20)^{189}
- Liham ng Sama ng Loob^{3}
- Tandem! (2010–20)^{18}
  - Lima at Oro: Tandem! (2010–18)^{18}
  - Lima at Logan: Tandem! (2018–20)^{18}
- Lingkod Aksyon (2020–21)^{9}
- Lingkod Kapamilya sa DZMM (2017–20)^{18}
- Lingkod Kapamilya sa TeleRadyo (2020–23)^{18}
- LOL: Labor of Love (2020)^{18}
- Local Legends (2019–20)^{18}
- Lovelines (2003–07)^{1}
- Love Notes^{18}
- Logan Live (2012–13)^{18}
- Lulubog Lilitaw^{4}
- Luna Rosa^{3}
- Lundagin Mo, Baby^{4}
- Lunes Na Naman^{3}
- Ma-Beauty Po Naman (2004–20)^{18}
- Magandang Gabi... Bayan (1988–2005)^{1}
- Magandang Gabi Dok (2008–17)^{18}
- Magandang Morning (2004–20)^{189}
  - Magandang Morning with Julius and Niña (2011–15)^{18}
  - Magandang Morning with Julius and Tintin (2004–11)^{18}
  - Magandang Morning with Julius and Zen (2015–20)^{189}
- Magandang Umaga^{4}
- Magpayo Nga Kayo (2002–20)^{18}
- Magsasalusalo Tayo^{5}
- Mahal Kita Inay^{4}
- Mangatuwiran Ka^{5}
- Manila Calling Hollywood^{7}
- Manila's Finest^{4}
- Manila Serenade^{4}
- Manila Stock Exchange Quotations^{3}
- Maria Flordeluna (2007–08)^{1}
- Masterwork Hour^{7}
- Matanglawin (2017–20)^{8}
- Matinding Martin D (2001–04)^{1}
- Mel & Jay (1987–96)^{1}
  - Radio edition (1987–95)^{1}
  - TV simulcast (1991–96)^{1}
- Memories with Music^{7}
- Mga Liham^{4}
- Mga Liham ng Pag-ibig (radio drama)^{3}
- Mga Tanyag na Himig^{3}
- Midnight Patrol (1990–94)^{1}
- Mismo (2011–17)^{18}
- Mission Possible (2015–20)^{18}
- Mission X sa DZMM (2001–04)^{1}
- MMDA Metro Traffic Live (2011–20)^{18}
- MMK Klasik (2010–20)^{8}
- Modern Showcase^{6}
- Modus (1999–2001)^{1}
- Moment Musicale^{7}
- Moonlight Serenade (2013–20)^{18}
- MOR 101.9 sa DZMM (2020)^{1}
  - SLR: Sex, Love & Relationships with Chico Martin^{1}
  - Dear MOR Midnight Replays^{1}
  - Music Automation^{1}
- Morning Matches^{3}
- MPD Program
- Mr. Arangkada^{7}
- Mr. Cariñoso (1991–99)^{1}
- Ms. M. Confidential (2012–13)^{18}
- Ms. M, Ms. O, Mismo (1999–2000)^{1}
- Mukha (2017–20)^{8}
- Music and Memories (2007–13)^{18}
- Music As You Like It^{4}
- Music for Millions^{7}
- Musika A.T.B.P. (2001–05)^{1}
- Music automation sa TeleRadyo Serbisyo & Radyo 630 (2023–24)^{210}
- My Puhunan (2015–20)^{18}
- Nagbabalik na Kahapon^{4}
- Nationalization Movement Program^{3}
- NegoSHEnte (2022–23)^{9}
- Negro Vendetta^{4}
- News and Views^{3}
- Newspaper of the Air^{3}
- News Patrol (2020)^{9}
- Ngayong Gabi^{4}
- Noche de Amor^{4}
- NoliLinggo (1986)^{1}
- Noontime Serenade^{3}
- OA with Onse and Alex (2012–13)^{18}
- Oh Yes, It's Neil Ocampo! (1993–96)^{1}
- Omaga-Diaz Report (2014–21)^{18}
- Omaga-Diaz Reports (2021–23)^{9}
- OMJ! (2013–20)^{18}
- On the Spot (2017–23)^{189}
- Ora Pro Nobis^{4}
- Oras ng Kasayahan^{35}
- Oras ng Pananghalian^{5}
- Pacquiao vs Broner: The DZMM Special (January 20, 2019)^{18}
- Pacquiao vs Thurman: The DZMM Special (July 21, 2019)^{18}
- P.A.K.S.A.: Pagtalakay at Kaisipan sa mga Isyung Panlipunan (2004–08)^{18}
- Pag-Ibig, Buhay, Atbp. (1986–2001)^{1}
- Palibhasa Bagets (1992–96)^{1}
- Pamilyang Pinoy (1994–99)^{1}
- Pan AM News^{3}
- Pantawid ng Pag-ibig: At Home Together Concert (March 22, 2020; together with ABS-CBN, S+A, ANC, Jeepney TV, Asianovela Channel, Metro Channel, MOR Philippines, iWant, TFC, and Myx)^{18}
- Para Sa'yo, Bayan (2005–10)^{18}
- Para sa Lahat ^{7}
- Pareng Partners (2018–19)^{8}
- Pasada (2023–24)^{210}
- Pasada Sais Trenta (1999–2020)^{18}
- Pasada Sais Trenta Sabado (2001–14)^{18}
- Pasada sa TeleRadyo (2020–23)^{9}
- Patnubay ng Lahi^{3}
- Patrol ng Pilipino (2011–12)
- Phil-Am Morning Melodies^{4}
- P. I. Tunes^{3}
- Pinky at Ricky sa Opinyon (2006–09)^{18}
- Pinoy, Panalo Ka! (2019–20)^{18}
- Pinoy Saykologi (2000–01)^{1}
- Pinoy Vibes (2007–20)^{18}
- Pintig Balita (2004–20)^{18}
- Pintig ng Bayan (2023–24)^{210}
- PinaSigla! (2025–2026)^{18}
- Platter Dish^{6}
- Playback (2020–23)^{9}
- Private Confessions (2004–05)^{1}
- Putaton^{3}
- Private Nights (2007–20)^{18}
- Prrrt! Teka Muna (1994–2003)^{1}
- Public Hearing (1993–2000)^{1}
- Pulis, Pulis, Kung Umaksyon Mabilis (1993–2001)^{1}
- Pulso ng Bayan (1988–2005)^{1}
- Quiet Moments^{10}
- Radyo Negosyo (2000–20)^{18}
- Radyo OFW (2004–05)^{1}
- Radyo Patrol Balita (2001–20)^{18}
  - Radyo Patrol Balita Alas-Dose (2001–05, 2006–19)^{18}
  - Radyo Patrol Balita Alas-Dose Weekend (Saturday edition; 2001–05, 2010–20, Sunday edition; 2001–20)^{18}
  - Radyo Patrol Balita Alas Dose Y Medya Sabado (2006–10)^{18}
  - Radyo Patrol Balita Alas-Kuwatro (4pm newscast) (2001–17)^{18}
  - Radyo Patrol Balita Alas-Kuwatro Weekend (4am weekend newscast) (2001–20)^{18}
  - Radyo Patrol Balita Alas-Kuwatro Weekend (4pm weekend newscast) (Saturday edition; 2001–2014, Sunday edition; 2005–2011)^{18}
  - Radyo Patrol Balita Alas-Onse Y Medya (2005–06)^{1}
  - Radyo Patrol Balita Alas-Onse Y Medya Sabado (2005–06)^{1}
  - Radyo Patrol Balita Linggo (2011–18)^{18}
  - Radyo Patrol Balita Midnight (2001–04)^{1}
  - Radyo Patrol Balita Tonight (2004–05)^{1}
- Radyo Patrol Red Alert (1989–2004)^{1}
- Radyo, Radyo (2004–05)^{1}
- Radyo Taliba (1987–90)^{1}
- Rated K (2017–20)^{89}
- Rated Korina (2012–14)^{18}
- Razon... Sa Likod ng mga Balita (1999–2000)^{1}
- Recess Na Naman^{3}
- Record Bar Program^{3}
- Red Alert sa DZMM (2013–20)^{18}
- Red Alert sa TeleRadyo (2020)^{9}
- Relos Reports (1993–2001)^{1}
- Remember When (1960s, 2013–20)^{168}
- Ronda Pasada (2025–2026)^{18}
- Rosary^{5}
- Rosalinda (finale episode broadcasts) (2000)^{1}
- Rosaryo ng Bayan: Holy Rosary On the Air (2017–22)^{189}
- S.A.B.A.D.O. (1992–2004)^{1}
- Sakto (2014–23)^{189}
- Salamin ng Kapalaran^{3}
- Sana'y Wala Nang Wakas (finale week broadcasts) (2004)^{1}
- Sa Atin Naman ^{3}
- Sa Kabukiran (1997–2020)^{18}
- Sa Lalim ng Kapalaran^{3}
- Sa Landas ni Hesus: Maglakbay, Magnilay (March 29–31, 2018)^{8}
- Salitang Buhay (1995–2020)^{18}
- Sagot Ko 'Yan! (2004–09, 2013–21)^{18}
- Sekretaria^{4}
- Serbisyong DSWD for Every Juan (2025–2026)^{18}
- Safe Space (2023–2026)^{18}
- Showbiz Extra (2005–13)^{18}
- Showbiz Mismo (2004–11)^{18}
- Showbiz Sidelines (2024–25)^{210}
- Showbuzz (2017–20)^{18}
- Share Ko Lang (2023–24)^{210}
- Si Ike sa Mike^{3}
- Si Kuya Cesar^{3}
- Si Uncle Nick^{5}
- SikaPinoy (1986–2013)^{18}
- Silakbo^{4}
- Sisong Kantanod
- S.O.C.O.: Scene of the Crime Operatives (2011–12, 2017–20)^{89}
- Sonata^{7}
- Song Hits^{3}
- Song Recital^{7}
- Song Spinner^{4}
- Songhits: Tunog Pinoy (February 10–November 17, 2018)^{18}
- Sponsored³
- SRO: Suhestyon, Reaksyon at Opinyon (2010–23)^{189}
- Sports Talk (2004–14)^{18}
- Star Patrol (1986–92)^{1}
- Storyline (2011–12)^{8}
- State of the Nation Address (1986–present)
- Student Canteen^{4}
- Sumali Kayo^{4}
- Sunday Network News sa DZMM (1995–2000)^{1}
- Surtidos^{4}
- Sweet and Lovely^{6}
- Symphanic Hour^{7}
- Taga Bukid^{4}
- TALAKAN: Talakayan at Kantiyawan (2007–11)^{18}
- Talkback sa DZMM (2007–09)^{18}
- Tambalang Failon at Sanchez (1995–2000; 2004–09)^{18}
- Tambalang Failon at Webb (2009–11)^{18}
- Tampak sa Hapong Ito^{5}
- Tanging Yaman (radio drama version) (2000–01)^{1}
- Taong Bagay^{4}
- Tapatan ni Tunying (2015–19)^{28}
- Tatak: Serbisyo (2023–25)^{210}
- Tawag ng Pananghalian^{3}
- Tawag ng Tanghalan^{4}
- Teka Muna (2013–18)^{18}
- TeleBalita (2020)^{9}
- TeleBalita Weekend (2020)^{9}
- TeleRadyo Balita (2020–23)^{9}
- TeleRadyo Balita Weekend (2020–22)^{9}
- TeleRadyo Breaking News (2020–23)^{9}
- TeleRadyo Live (2020–23)^{9}
- TeleRadyo Serbisyo Flash Report (2023–24)^{210}
- TeleRadyo Serbisyo Newsbreak (2023–24)^{210}
- TeleRadyo Serbisyo & Radyo 630 Special Coverage (2023–24)^{210}
- TeleRadyo Serbisyo Replay (2023)^{10}
- TeleRadyo Serbisyo Rewind (2023)^{10}
- Teenage Hangout^{7}
- The Secret of Health (2026)
- The Ballet Stage^{7}
- The Buzz sa DZMM (2004–08)^{18}
- The Cocktail Shaker^{6}
- The Nation's Top Two^{5}
- The Rush Hour^{6}
- The World Tonight (2020; during the COVID-19 pandemic)^{8}
- Timbangan ng Katarungan^{3}
- Tiya Dely^{4}
- Today's Personality^{3}
- Tomorrow's News^{3}
- Todo Balita (2001–10)^{18}
- Todo-Todo Walang Preno (2002–20)^{189}
- Top Ten^{3}
- Trabaho Lang, Walang Personalan (1991–99)^{1}
- Trabaho Panalo! (2008–14)^{18}
- Tropang Makulit (1993–99)^{1}
- Tsismis 'To 'Day (1992–98)^{1}
- Tugtugin Natin^{3}
- Tulong Ko, Pasa Mo (2018–23)^{189}
- Turo-Turo (2014–20)^{18}
- Tugtuging Tagalog^{3}
- Tutyapis^{4}
- TV Patrol Playback (2023–24)^{10}
- TV Patrol sa TeleRadyo (2020–23)^{9}
- TV Patrol sa TeleRadyo Serbisyo and Radyo 630 (2023–25)^{210}
- TV Patrol Weekend sa TeleRadyo (2020–23)^{9}
- TV Patrol Weekend sa TeleRadyo Serbisyo and Radyo 630 (2023–25)^{210}
- Twentieth Century Music^{7}
- U-Talk 2.0 (2002–07)^{1}
- UAAP sa DZMM (radio broadcasts) (2013–14)^{1}
- Ulitin Natin^{3}
- Usapang de Campanilla (2001–20)^{18}
- Usapang Kalye (2020–21)^{189}
- Usapang Kapatid (2006–20)^{18}
- Usapang Kaperahan (2023)^{210}
- Viuda de Oro^{4}
- Wake Up^{3}
- Wake Up, Neighbor?^{3}
- Winner Sa Life (2020–23)^{9}
- What It's All About Alfie (2004–08)^{1}
- Wow Trending (2017–20)^{1}
- Wow Sikat (2023–25)^{12810}
- XXX: Exklusibong, Explosibong, Exposé (2011–12)^{8}
- Yan Tayo (2024-2026) ^{12810}
- Yagit sa Kalsada^{4}
- Yesterday (2010–20)^{189}
  - Saturday edition (2010–18)^{18}
  - Sunday edition (2010–20)^{189}
- You and the Night and the Music^{4}
- Your Daily Do's (2020–23)^{9}

^{1} under DZMM Radyo Patrol 630
^{2} under Radyo 630
^{3} under DZAQ 620/960
^{4} under DZXL 960/620
^{5} under DZBC 1000
^{6} under DZQL 830
^{7} under DZMM 1340
^{8} under DZMM TeleRadyo
^{9} under TeleRadyo
^{10} under TeleRadyo Serbisyo

== See also ==
- List of programs broadcast by DZMM/DZMM TeleRadyo
