= Niña Corpuz =

Filipino journalist and entrepreneur (born 1977)

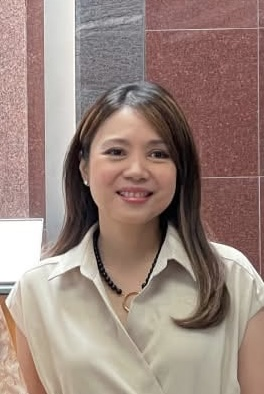
- Corpuz in 2025
- Born: Niña Marie Fernando Corpuz; February 25, 1977 (age 49); Manila, Philippines
- Education: Cardiff University; University of the Philippines-Diliman
- Occupations: Journalist; businessperson
- Employers: ABS-CBN Corporation (2000–2020); People's Television Network (2023–present); Philippine Collective Media Corporation (2024–present)
- Spouse: Vince Rodriguez (m. 2008)
- Children: 3
- Relatives: Teddy Corpuz (cousin)

Niña Marie Fernando Corpuz-Rodriguez (Tagalog: [ˈnɪɲa ˈkɔɾpus ɾɔˈdɾigɛs]; born February 25, 1977) is a Filipino broadcast journalist and entrepreneur. She served as a reporter for ABS-CBN's flagship newscasts, TV Patrol and Bandila, as well as the ABS-CBN News Channel (ANC). Corpuz also anchored Balitang Europe, which aired on TFC and ANC. In addition to her television work, she hosted a daily afternoon radio program, Good Vibes, on ABS-CBN's flagship AM station, DZMM, and co-presented the morning show Magandang Umaga, Bayan with Ogie Diaz.

She later worked as a radio anchor on RP1, co-hosting Erwin Tulfo On-Air with Niña Corpuz alongside Erwin Tulfo. Corpuz also became a prominent anchor on PTV, where she hosted Bagong Pilipinas Ngayon, Sentro Balita, and currently, Health@Home.

At present, Corpuz anchors the afternoon program Nagseserbisyo, Niña Corpuz on DZMM Radyo Patrol 630 (formerly DWPM Radyo 630), alongside Migs Bustos. The program debuted on July 1, 2024, marking her return to the 630 kHz frequency after four years. She also co-anchored Arangkada Balita, the flagship primetime newscast of PRTV Prime Media, alongside former ABS-CBN News reporter Jeck Batallones.

== Awards ==
=== 2010 Media For Labor Rights Prize ===
The 2010 Media for Labour Rights Prize was awarded to Nina for her article entitled "Filipino Domestic Workers: The Struggle For Justice And Survival" about domestic workers and the threats of trafficking and abuse that they face. The award was given by the International Labour Organization's International Training Centre in Turin.

=== 2014 ===
Female Broadcast Journalist of the Year for Radio (Magandang Gabi Dok!) - Rotary Club of Manila Journalism Awards

== Personal life ==
Corpuz is the founder of Niña Inabel, a successful handwoven clothing brand that showcases modern yet classic designs rooted in Philippine heritage. Her brand promotes traditional Filipino weaves and provides sustainable support for local weavers, blending cultural preservation with contemporary fashion.

She is the cousin of Rocksteddy lead band vocalist, comedian and It's Showtime TV host Teddy Corpuz.
