= Migs Bustos =

Filipino television personality

- Born: Miguel Carlos Lim Bustos; December 4, 1988 (age 37); Quezon City, Metro Manila, Philippines
- Education: De La Salle University (BS)
- Occupations: Television newscaster; Radio host
- Employer: ABS-CBN
- Agent: ABS-CBN Corporation
- Spouse: Michelle Mediana (m. 2018)
- Children: 2

Miguel Carlos "Migs" Lim Bustos (born December 4, 1988) is a Filipino sports television news anchor, forecaster, commentator and reporter and model working for the Philippine media conglomerate ABS-CBN Corporation.

== Early life and education ==
Miguel Carlos Lim Bustos was born on December 4, 1988. In 2006, Bustos graduated high school in De La Salle Zobel. In 2010, Bustos obtained his bachelor's degree in business management at De La Salle University.

== Career ==
Bustos worked as a commentator at National Collegiate Athletic Association on ABS-CBN Sports and Action (then IZTV and now Aliw Channel 23) and as a field reporter for Bandila and TV Patrol on ABS-CBN before he works as a sports news anchor on Gametime, a 30-minute nightly sports newscast featuring sports highlights, game recaps, exclusive interviews, and interactive segments on ANC. He is also the host of REV which features cars. He also appeared in different television advertisements.

Bustos is also a licensed real estate broker.

In 2021, Bustos became the host of the lifestyle program Rev+ on ANC, together with fellow cable news anchor Nikki de Guzman. In 2022, he became the segment host of TV Patrol's newest segment, "Uso at Bago." After the passing of sports commentator and news anchor Boyet Sison, Bustos replaced him as the segment host of "Alam N'yo Ba?" on the news program. The same year, he became one of the co-hosts of Dr. Care and Pasok Mga Suki on PIE Channel with beauty queen Nicole Cordoves and online business personality Madam Inutz.

In 2023, Bustos debuted as a radio host through the program SKL, Share Ko Lang! on DWPM Radyo 630 and TeleRadyo Serbisyo. In 2024, Bustos became the host of the new program, Nagseserbisyo, Niña Corpuz, alongside Niña Corpuz. He later debuted as a disc jockey of the newly launched FM Radio 92.3, the sister FM station of DWPM Radyo 630 (renamed back to DZMM Radyo Patrol 630 since), as DJ Migs.

In 2026, Bustos participated in Kapamilya Deal or No Deal as the second batch of contestants (dubbed Lucky Stars), in which he was chosen to play as contestant on August 22. He won ₱188,000 for his charity via accepting the banker's offer at the final round. He made the right choice to accept the offer, as his briefcase he held contain ₱200 while the other briefcase contained ₱500,000.

== Personal life ==
In October 2018, Bustos married former TV5 reporter Michelle Mediana. They have a daughter named Margaux Andrea and a son named Michael Angelo.
