= Tina Marasigan =

Filipina model, beauty queen and journalist (born 1988)

- Born: Maria Kristina May Marasigan; May 2, 1988 (age 38); Batangas City, Philippines
- Occupation: Journalist
- Spouse: Franco Reyes (m. 2025)
- Awards: Binibining Pilipinas 2011 (Top 15)

Maria Kristina "Tina" May Marasigan-Reyes (born May 2, 1988) is a Filipina model, beauty queen, and journalist best known as a news anchor for ABS-CBN News, and for having been a finalist in the 2009 Ford Supermodel of the World competition and the 2011 Binibining Pilipinas pageant.

== Television ==
Year	Title	Role	Network
2011–2014	UAAP Sports Coverage	Herself / Host	Studio 23 / ABS-CBN Sports+Action
2011	Binibining Pilipinas 2011	Herself / Contestant	ABS-CBN
2012–2020	Bandila	Herself / Anchor	ABS-CBN
2012–2020	TV Patrol	Herself / Anchor	ABS-CBN
2013–2020	Todo-Todo Walang Preno	Substitute anchor for Winnie Cordero	DZMM TeleRadyo
2014–2016	Fastbreak	Herself / Host	ABS-CBN Sports+Action
2017–2020	Umagang Kay Ganda	Herself / Host	ABS-CBN
2020–2021	Usapang Kalye	Herself / Anchor	TeleRadyo
2025–2026	PINASigla	Herself / Anchor	DZMM TeleRadyo / PRTV Prime Media

== Radio ==
Year	Title	Station
2013–2020	Todo-Todo Walang Preno	DZMM
2025–2026	PINASigla	DZMM

== See also ==
- Athena Imperial
- Cathy Untalan
- Emma Tiglao
- Ganiel Krishnan
