= DZMM Radyo Patrol 630 =

DZMM Radyo Patrol 630 may refer to:

- DZMM, a radio station under ABS-CBN from 1986 to 2020
- DWPM, a radio station currently known as DZMM Radyo Patrol 630 under Media Serbisyo Production Corporation since 2025
