= On the Spot (Philippine TV program) =

- Genre: News; Public affairs Talk radio
- Presented by: Tony Velasquez (2020–2023); Karmina Constantino-Torres (2022–2023); (See Anchors for former hosts)
- Country of origin: Philippines
- Original language: Filipino

Production
- Running time: 22-85 minutes

Original release
- Network: DZMM (2017–2020); DZMM TeleRadyo (2017–2020)
- Release: April 19, 2017 – March 18, 2020
- Network: TeleRadyo (2020–2023)
- Release: September 1, 2020 – June 29, 2023

On the Spot was a Philippine news and public affairs program broadcast on DZMM, DZMM TeleRadyo, and TeleRadyo. Originally premiering in 2017 as an afternoon program anchored by Vic Lima and Toni Aquino, it was later revived as a morning show in August 2020 following the conclusion of Failon Ngayon sa DZMM. The program concluded on June 29, 2023, ahead of TeleRadyo's transition to TeleRadyo Serbisyo, with its format resuming under the title Isyu Spotted the following month.

== Broadcast history ==
=== Afternoon run (2017–2020) ===
On the Spot debuted in 2017 as the successor to the afternoon newscast of the 4pm edition of Radyo Patrol Balita, featuring Vic Lima and Toni Aquino as anchors. The program continued airing on DZMM and DZMM TeleRadyo until early 2020. (Note: Dr. Love: Always and Forever, Magandang Gabi Dok, and Radyo Patrol Balita: Alas Kwatro aired their final broadcasts to give way to new programming. Two days later DZMM launched the three replacement programs Good Vibes, On the Spot, and Wow Trending, with the latter program only airing on the station to fill a gap in TeleRadyo's broadcast of ABS-CBN's weekend programming.)

=== Morning revival (2020–2023) ===
On August 31, 2020, the program was revived on TeleRadyo in the 8:00 AM – 10:00 AM weekday morning timeslot, replacing Failon Ngayon sa DZMM. Ricky Rosales and Kori Quintos served as interim anchors for its first week before Henry Omaga-Diaz and Tony Velasquez took over the broadcast on September 7, 2020. Omaga-Diaz's tenure was brief, as he was soon reassigned to anchor TV Patrol following Ted Failon's departure from the network. (Note: On August 31 Failon Ngayon sa TeleRadyo aired its final episode following Ted Failon and DJ Chacha's departure from ABS-CBN, and was replaced by On the Spot.)

On September 21, 2020, the program shifted to a 90-minute slot from 9:00 AM to 10:30 AM, with Danny Buenafe joining Velasquez as co-anchor. Buenafe later left the show on July 1, 2022, and was temporarily replaced by Sherrie Ann Torres starting July 4, 2022, before Karmina Constantino-Torres permanently succeeded him on July 11, 2022. (Note: On September 21, 2020 Kabayan moved to an 8:00 a.m. timeslot with a one-hour runtime to make way for Gising Pilipinas at 6:00 a.m., temporarily ending its simulcast on Kapamilya Channel until October 23. On October 26 Sakto returned to TeleRadyo with new hosts Amy Perez, Jeff Canoy, and Johnson Manabat, airing from 6:00 a.m. to 7:30 a.m. and replacing Gising Pilipinas, also resuming being simulcast on Kapamilya Channel. That same day, On the Spot shifted to 9:00 a.m. to 10:30 a.m., preceding Lingkod Kapamilya sa TeleRadyo.)

The program aired its final episode on June 29, 2023, as part of TeleRadyo's programming wind-down, and was replaced in its timeslot by Pintig ng Bayan. Its format was later revived on July 17, 2023, under the new title Isyu Spotted on TeleRadyo Serbisyo. (Note: A day prior to the launch, hosts of several programs from ABS-CBN's Filipino cable news channel TeleRadyo (formerly DZMM TeleRadyo) has informed their viewers to tune-in to the new station the next day. Its soft launch coincided with the relaunch of TeleRadyo as TeleRadyo Serbisyo, which is also now handled under the Prime Media/ABS-CBN joint-venture management.)

== Anchors ==
=== Final anchors ===
- Tony Velasquez (2020–2023)
- Karmina Constantino-Torres (2022–2023)

=== Former anchors ===
- Vic Lima (2017–2020)
- Toni Aquino (2017–2020)
- Ricky Rosales (2020)
- Kori Quintos (2020)
- Henry Omaga-Diaz (2020)
- Danny Buenafe (2020–2022)
- Sherrie Ann Torres (2022, interim)

== Timeslot history ==
Network	Timeslot	Dates
DZMM / DZMM TeleRadyo	Afternoon slot (4:00 PM)	2017–2020
TeleRadyo	8:00 AM – 10:00 AM	August 31 – September 18, 2020
TeleRadyo	9:00 AM – 10:30 AM	September 21, 2020 – June 29, 2023
