= Bo Sanchez =

Filipino Catholic author

Personal life
- Born: Eugenio Isabelo Tomas Reyes Sanchez Jr. July 11, 1966 (age 60) Caloocan, Rizal, Philippines
- Spouse: Marowe Sanchez (m. 1998)
- Children: 2
- Education: Ateneo de Manila University (AB)
- Known for: Preacher
- Pen name: Bo Sanchez
- Website: bosanchez.ph

Religious life
- Religion: Christianity
- Denomination: Roman Catholic
- Institute: Light of Jesus Family

Eugenio Isabelo Tomas Reyes Sanchez Jr. (born July 11, 1966), commonly known as Bo Sanchez (Tagalog: [boʊ ˈsɐntʃes]), is a Filipino author, entrepreneur, Catholic lay preacher, motivational speaker, and minister. He is known as the "Preacher in Blue Jeans", and the founder of Light of Jesus Family and The Feast, a Catholic charismatic group.

== Early life ==
Bo Sanchez was born as Eugenio Isabelo Tomas Reyes Sanchez Jr. on July 11, 1966, in Caloocan, to Eugenio Sr. and Pilar Sanchez.

His parents often took him to prayer meetings, which they started attending in 1978 at the Upper Room Prayer Group in Project 7, Quezon City. They later established their own prayer group, the Light of Jesus, in their residence in Cubao, Quezon City. The first prayer meeting by the Light of Jesus was led by Eugenio Sanchez Sr. on September 9, 1980.

Sanchez completed his Bachelor of Arts in Philosophy at Ateneo de Manila University.

== Ministerial career ==
On September 16, 1980, during the second prayer meeting of the Light of Jesus, Sanchez gave his first talk aged 13. He took up Masters in Theology but did not complete his thesis due to his ministerial work. In 1996, he also founded the Anawim, a facility for taking care of abandoned elderly people in Rodriguez, Rizal.

Sanchez has received many awards and honours in the Philippines and the Church, including winning the Ten Outstanding Young Men award in 2006.

He is the founder of the Filipino religious community, the Light of Jesus Family. As of 2016, the community had 35,000 members in the Philippines and around the world. Through this, he founded two gatherings, the annual inspirational convention Kerygma Conference (now rebranded as Feast Conference, founded in 2006) and the weekly fellowship and worship called "The Feast" in 200 areas in the country and other parts of the world. He also founded the Truly Rich Club, an online private membership group where subscribers are provided with financial advice on how to invest in the stock market.

He also hosted a daily radio program on Radio Veritas and Kape at Salita on DZMM and TeleRadyo from 2018 to 2021.

== Personal life ==
Bo Sanchez is married to Marowe Sanchez, with whom he has two sons.

== Filmography ==
Television

Year	Title	Role
2003–present	Kerygma TV (now Feast TV)	Host
2005–??	Tara na Pinoy!	Host
2013	Powerhouse	Guest
2018–2021	Kape at Salita	Co-host
2020	Magandang Buhay	Guest
2022	7 Last Words	Preacher, Third Word
2025	Family Feud	Contestant
