= Jun Banaag =

Filipino former radio personality (born 1951)

Brother Jun Banaag TOSD
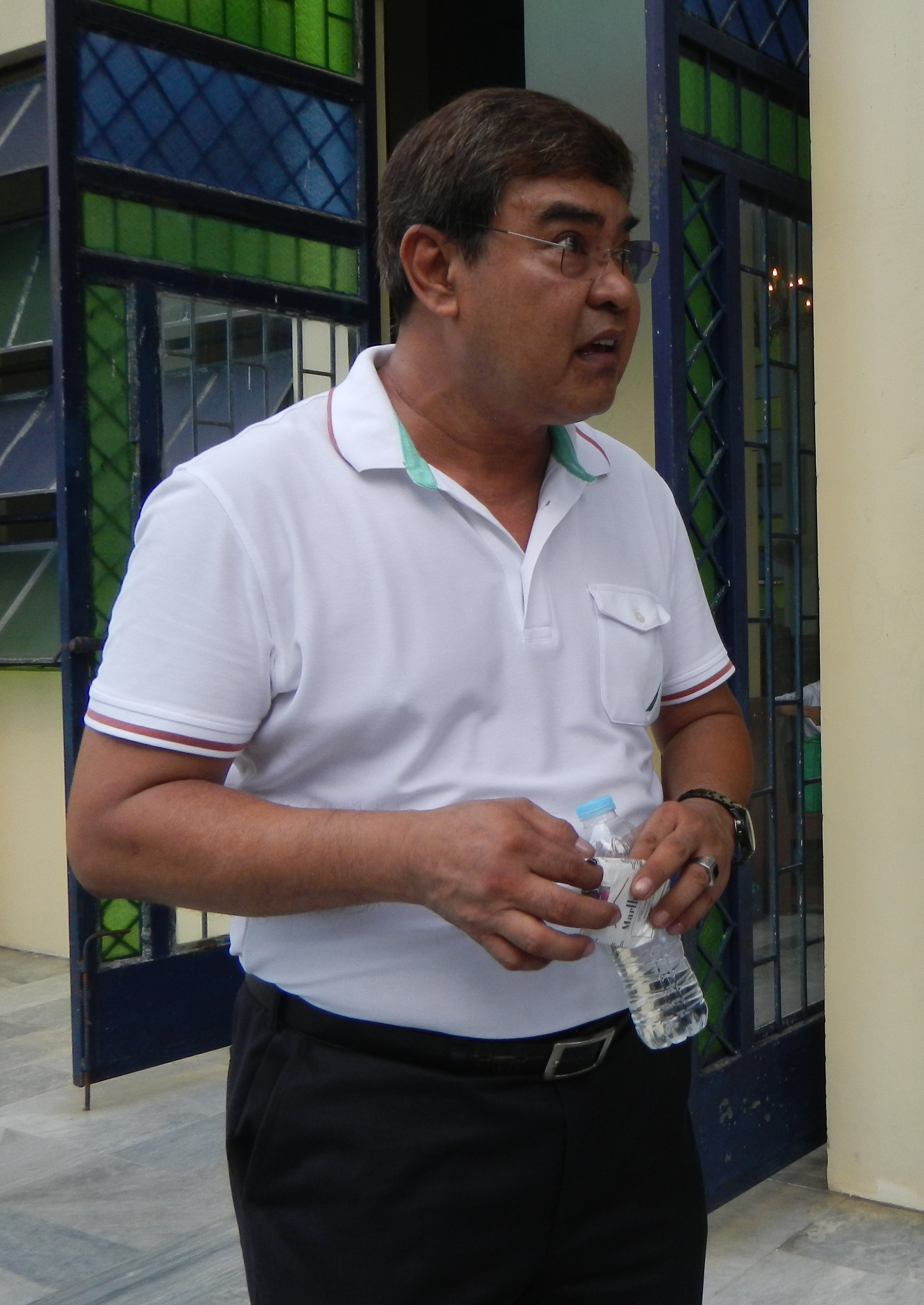
- Banaag at Our Lady of Lourdes Grotto Shrine, San Jose del Monte in May 2015
- Born: Juanito Manuel Banaag; June 23, 1951 (age 75); Taguig, Rizal, Philippines
- Education: Far Eastern University
- Occupations: Radio personality, television personality
- Years active: 1970–2026 (radio); 2026–present (digital)
- Spouse: Lourdes Banaag
- Children: 5
- Career
- Stations: DZEC (1970–1973); DWLS (1976–1983); DWRX (1983–1987); DZOO (1987–1989); DZMM (1987; 1997–2020); ABS-CBN (1987; 1997–2022); DZNN (1995–1997); Radyo5/True FM (2022–2026); TV5 (2023–2026)

Juanito "Jun" Manuel Banaag, TOSD (Tagalog: [hwaˈnitɔʔ manˈwel bɐˈnaʔag]; born June 23, 1951), also known as Dr. Love, is a Filipino former radio disc jockey and television personality known for his radio program, Dr. Love Radio Show, where he gives spiritual and practices advices on matters of life and love. He hosted his program on 105.9 True FM (formerly Radyo5) from December 26, 2022 to June 12, 2026 and previously on DZMM and TeleRadyo from September 16, 1997 to December 11, 2022. He is currently hosting the digital love counseling program, Ikuwento Mo Kay Dr. Love, since July 25, 2026.

== Early life and education ==
Juanito Manuel Banaag was born on June 23, 1951 in Bambang, Taguig, Philippines. He studied theater arts at the Far Eastern University and was drawn into radio broadcasting while he was still in college. He has 8 siblings: 3 brothers (Atilano, Juanito and Gregorio) and 5 sisters (Aurora, Monica, Felicidad, Potenciana and Trinidad), while he has 5 children with his wife, Lourdes: 3 daughters (Anna Maria, April and Judy) and 2 sons (Juanito "John" II and Mark Lester).

He was once a philandering husband but repented. He said: "I started in 1997, but before that, I hope you all understand. I left my family for another woman. We lived in the States for 10 years. So, I was a philandering husband — was! After 10 years, I came back and that was 1997". That experience made him a credible counselor, starting in Radio Veritas, to listeners who phone in their predicaments in love and life.

== Broadcasting career ==
In 1995, Banaag hosted his first counseling radio program on Radio Veritas until 1997, after his return from the United States.

Banaag was invited to join DZMM to host the program, Dr. Love Radio Show, on September 16, 1997. In addition to offering comforting advice, he is very vocal on the nation's most pressing issues, such as the ongoing discussions about the country's divorce laws.

On January 3, 2011, he anchored Dr. Love Music Show (later Dr. Love: Always and Forever), a music program that airs every weekday afternoon, until June 16, 2017.

On August 28, 2020, after 23 years of radio hosting, his radio program Dr. Love Radio Show on TeleRadyo (now DZMM TeleRadyo) had temporarily stopped as ABS-CBN tried to arrange a proper timeslot for it. The show was granted a lease in life after almost being scrapped when ABS-CBN was denied a new broadcast franchise by the Philippine Congress. After Banaag pleaded with network management, his program aired on weekend evenings on September 5, 2020 (later on weekend afternoons on May 15, 2021), moving from its old weekday schedule. The show eventually returned but finally ended on December 11, 2022. However, the show moved to Radyo5 (later True FM) on December 26 of the same year, thus making the program revert to its old weekday evening schedule as well as Banaag's return to terrestrial radio after 2 years and 8 months and FM radio after 33 years.

From 2023 to 2026, Banaag had been an on-and-off part of TV5's Face 2 Face as one of the resident Trio Tagapayo representing the clergy.

On June 12, 2026, Banaag made his final appearance on Dr. Love Radio Show on 105.9 True FM as he would retire 18 days later due to pneumonia. Arnold Rei (a.k.a. DJ Popoy) became the relief anchor of the radio program on June 15 until it aired its final episode on June 30, 2026, thus ending his radio program after almost 29 years and his radio career after 56 years.

On July 25, 2026, Banaag would return to hosting, this time via Social Media platforms, on his new digital program, Ikuwento Mo Kay Dr. Love.

Banaag is a Roman Catholic and a devotee of the Blessed Virgin Mary. As a professed member of the Third Order of Saint Dominic, he and his wife are also involved in church ministries. He is currently the Vice Provincial of the Lay Dominicans in the Philippines.

== Awards and honors ==
- 2008: Catholic Mass Media Awardee for Best Counseling Program on Radio
- 2015: Catholic Mass Media Awards Hall of Fame
- 2019: 26th KBP Golden Dove Awards for Best Radio Variety Program Host
- 2020: 14th Eastwood City Walk of Fame
