= Remember When (radio program) =

- Title card on DZMM TeleRadyo
- Genre: Music
- Running time: 2 hours (3:00 pm – 5:00 pm)
- Country of origin: Philippines
- Home station: DZMM Radyo Patrol 630
- TV adaptations: DZMM TeleRadyo
- Hosted by: DJ Reggie Valdez
- Created by: ABS-CBN Broadcasting Corp. ABS-CBN News and Current Affairs
- Original release: August 18, 2013 – March 15, 2020
- No. of episodes: n/a (airs every Sundays)
- Opening theme: Remember When by The Platters
- Website: https://www.abs-cbn.com/dzmm

Remember When (stylized as Remember WHEN...) was a music program aired on DZMM TeleRadyo which was hosted by DJ Reggie Valdez. The program is aired every Sunday from 3:00 pm – 5:00 pm with simulcast on The Filipino Channel worldwide.

This program is named after the song from The Platters of the same name and it is also their theme song of the program. This program plays music of the 1960s, 1970s, and 1980s. The program is the successor of the music program Music and Memories which aired from 2007 to 2013.

The program went on hiatus due to the COVID-19 pandemic and the non-renewal of the ABS-CBN franchise starting March 22, 2020, until its cancellation due to the congress junking the new ABS-CBN legislative franchise on July 10, 2020. The show's original host, Norma Marco, died on August 15, 2024 at the age of 76.

== Hosts ==
=== Final host ===
- DJ Reggie Valdez (2020)

=== Former host ===
- Norma Marco (2013–19)

=== Guest host ===
- Rod Izon (2017–20)

== About ==
The show plays music from the 1960s, 1970s, and 1980s.

== See also ==
- DZMM TeleRadyo
- DZMM
- Yesterday
