= Looloo =

Defunct review and place discovery app

looloo
- Developer: The looloo Crew
- Initial release: November 2012; 13 years ago
- Stable release: 1.6.0 (iOS) / December 27, 2013
- Operating system: iOS
- Type: Social Networking
- Website: http://looloo.com

looloo was a review and place discovery social networking application for iOS and mobile site based in the Philippines. Launched on November 21, 2012, its primary function was to allow users to explore and discover restaurants, bars, hotels, salons, spas, and other places of interest through crowd-sourced reviews layered with the social dimension of being able to follow, recommend, and credit other users.

== History ==
looloo was founded by Odell Ramirez, with the goal of developing a way for Filipinos to "discover the best dining, entertainment, and travel destinations within Metro Manila."

Official work on the iPhone app and website began in March 2012. The nine months between then and launch were spent developing the actual product and building a place database from scratch, which involved team members physically mapping and geographically tagging establishments in areas in and around Metro Manila.

In January 2013, two months after launch, the looloo iOS app peaked at number 1 on the Philippine App Store for Top Free Apps and number 1 under the Social Networking category. The following month, expansion to other major cities in the Philippines began, including Cebu City, Baguio, Tagaytay, Bacolod, Iloilo, Davao, and other major cities in several provinces of the country.

The app has been featured in nationwide publications and news outlets, both online and offline, such as The Philippine Daily Inquirer, The Philippine Star, ABS-CBN News, GMA News Online, Yummy Magazine, Appetite Magazine, FOOD Magazine, and Esquire Philippines.

As of December 2013, looloo had more than 90,000 registered users and exceeded 100,000 user-submitted reviews. It was ranked as the no.1 most downloaded free app under the Food & Drink Category in the App Store (iOS).

== iOS App and Website ==
=== Review ===
Users of the looloo iOS app can review any of the places listed in app's place database. Its default setting detects nearby places for the user to review but a search function is available as well, should users decide to submit reviews for places not within their immediate vicinity.

Users provide a star rating of 1 to 5 for places they review. The review may or may not contain additional details such as text or a photo as a complement to the star rating given. All reviews submitted are then available for viewing on the looloo mobile site. The app gives the user the ability to share his or her review on Facebook or Twitter as well.

With each review, users may also send a direct recommendation to their “looloo friends”—fellow app users they follow and that follow them back.

=== Explore ===
Through the use of iOS devices’ location-based hardware, the looloo iOS application is able to detect a device's location when using the Explore feature and display places in the user's immediate vicinity or in areas users may search for. Places are depicted as pins on a map or in a list, with their corresponding average star ratings. Explore filters may also be applied to identify places nearby, or those that are top-rated, trending, or offering Specials, among others.

Users may view each place's profile page which displays information such as the place's name and address, operating hours and telephone number, average star rating, number of reviews and recommendations, as well as the complete list of all reviews submitted for that place.

Places may also be added to lists for later viewing.

=== Specials ===
In the 2nd quarter of 2013, looloo launched feature called "looloo Specials"

This allowed partner merchants to extend special offers to looloo app users. These offers are may be redeemed by users upon visiting participating establishments.
