= List of programs broadcast by DZMM/DZMM TeleRadyo =

Programs of DZMM/DZMM TeleRadyo include news, news commentary, public service, public affairs, love and personal advice, music, entertainment and showbiz, informative, business, health and lifestyle, drama anthology, religious and spiritual programs. It also aired newscasts and current affairs programs from ABS-CBN and some original programming exclusively for DZMM TeleRadyo.

== Current programming ==
=== News commentary, issues, politics ===
- ATM: Anong Take Mo? (2023–present)
- Ano'ng Ganap? (2023–present)
- Balita Antemano (2024–present)
- Balitapatan (2024–present)
- Dekalibreng Balita (2026–present)
- Gising Pilipinas (1990–2020, 2023–present)
- Isyu Spotted (2023–present)
- Kabayan (1986–2001, 2010–present)
  - Alerto sa Super El Niño (2026–present)
- Story Outlook (2023–present)
- Tandem ng Bayan (2025–present)

=== News ===
- DZMM Balita Ngayon (1986–2020, 2025–present)
- DZMM Radyo Patrol Flash Report ( 2025–present; up-to-minute breaking news)
- DZMM Special Coverage (1986–2020, 2025–present)
- Headline sa Hapon (2024–present)
- Headline Ngayon (2023–present)
- Pasada Balita (2026–present)
- Radyo Patrol Balita Sabado (Weekend 4am edition) (2026-present)
- Radyo Patrol Balita Alas-Kwatro (Weekday 4 am edition) (2025–present)
- Radyo Patrol Balita Alas-Siyete (2001–2020; 2025–present)
- Radyo Patrol Balita Alas-Siyete Weekend (2004–2020; 2025–present)
- TV Patrol sa DZMM (2000–2020, 2025–present; hook-up with A2Z, All TV, ANC, Kapamilya Channel and PRTV Prime Media)
- TV Patrol Weekend sa DZMM (2004,–present; hook-up with A2Z, All TV, ANC, Kapamilya Channel and PRTV Prime Media)

=== Health ===
- Iwas Sakit, Iwas Gastos (2023–present)
- Kaagapay sa Kalusugan (2026–present)

=== Public service and Public affairs ===
- Aksyon Ngayon (1991–present)
- Hello Attorney (2023–present)
- Konek Ka D'yan (2023–present)
- Mutya ng Masa (2026–present)
- Nagseserbisyo, Niña Corpuz at Migs Bustos (2024–present)
- Pasado Serbisyo (2023–present)
- Spot Report (2023–present)
- S.O.C.O. sa DZMM (, 2005–present)

=== Love and Personal Advice ===
- Ako 'To Si Tyang Amy (2024–present)
- Feel Kita (2023–present)
- Love Konek (2024–present; DZMM Radyo Patrol 630 and DZMM TeleRadyo local cable and satellite feed only)
- Private Confessions (2004–2005; 2026–present)
- Private Talks (2024–present; DZMM Radyo Patrol 630 and DZMM TeleRadyo local cable and satellite feed only)

=== Music ===
- K-Paps Playlist (2023–present; hook-up with PRTV Prime Media every Sundays)
- Remember Your Music (2024–present; DZMM Radyo Patrol 630 and DZMM TeleRadyo local cable and satellite feed only)

=== Entertainment and Showbiz ===
- Alam na Dis! (2025–present)
- Bongga Ka Jhai (2023–present)

=== Sports ===
- Tara, Game! sa DZMM (2026–present)

=== Disaster Preparedness ===
- Ligtas Dapat (2023–present; hook-up with PRTV Prime Media)

=== Religious and Spiritual Advice ===
- Panalangin sa Alas Tres ng Hapon (2024–present)
- Rosary Hour (1989–2004, 2023–present; hook-up with PRTV Prime Media)
- Sunny Side Up (2024–present)

=== Talk, Lifestyle and Magazine ===
- Mari-Tres (2026–present)
- Travel ni Ahwel (2023–present)
- TrendJing (2026–present)
- Win Today (2023–present)

=== Business and Consumer Advice ===
- Panalong Diskarte (2023–present)
- Wais Konsyumer (2023–present)

=== Drama Anthology ===
- Maalaala Mo Kaya sa DZMM (2003–present)

== See also ==
- DZMM (under ABS-CBN)
- DZMM (under Media Serbisyo Production Corporation)
- A2Z
- ABS-CBN
- ABS-CBN sa ALLTV2
- ANC
- Kapamilya Channel
- DZMM TeleRadyo
- PRTV Prime Media
