= Yesterday (radio program) =

Filipino radio music program

- Title card on TeleRadyo
- Genre: Music
- Running time: 3 hours (12:00 pm – 3:00 pm)
- Country of origin: Philippines
- Home station: DZMM Radyo Patrol 630
- TV adaptations: TeleRadyo
- Hosted by: DJ Richard Enriquez
- Created by: ABS-CBN Broadcasting Corporation; ABS-CBN News and Current Affairs
- Original release: July 3, 2010 – February 3, 2018 (Saturdays) & December 27, 2020 (Sundays)
- No. of episodes: n/a (airs every Weekends)
- Opening theme: Yesterday by the Beatles
- Website: https://www.abs-cbn.com/dzmm

Yesterday (stylized as Yesterday...) was a music program aired on DZMM TeleRadyo/TeleRadyo which was hosted by DJ Richard Enriquez. The program was aired from July 3, 2010 until December 27, 2020 every Sundays from 12:00 pm to 3:00 pm, with simulcast on The Filipino Channel worldwide. The program is named after the Beatles song of the same name and plays music from the 1960s, 1970s and the 1980s.

== History ==
Yesterday premiered on July 3, 2010, on DZMM Radyo Patrol 630 and DZMM TeleRadyo. This is DJ Richard Enriquez's first-ever musical program on AM Radio. It is aired every Saturdays from 1:00 pm – 3:00 pm and Sundays from 12:30 pm – 3:00 pm.

On February 3, 2018, Yesterday aired its final episode on its Saturday edition. It was replaced by the health program Healthy Sabado and an all-OPM music program Songhits: Tunog Pinoy on its timeslot. The latter program is still hosted by DJ Richard, but it is running for an hour, until it aired its final episode on November 17, 2018.

On April 5, 2020, Yesterday has moved to an earlier timeslot and extended from 12:00 pm – 4:00 pm due to the COVID-19 pandemic, as well as the program's 10th anniversary. On August 2, 2020, Yesterday has shortened its timeslot from 12:00 pm – 3:00 pm to give way to the early timeslot of Kapamilya Konek.

On December 27, 2020, Yesterday has aired its final episode after 10 years of broadcasting due to the said DJ leaving the station to return to his original station, DWDM 95.5 FM (which the reformat and rebranding of the station as Eagle FM 95.5 on January 20, 2021), an FM radio station owned by Eagle Broadcasting Corporation, after 11 years as part of its retrenchment program caused by the ABS-CBN shutdown, the Philippine Congress junks the new ABS-CBN legislative franchise to operate and the COVID-19 pandemic in the Philippines. It is replaced by the business program, Bida Konsyumer, and various ABS-CBN current affairs programs on its timeslot.

On January 25, 2021, the program returned and transferred to Eagle FM 95.5 and it was renamed as Yesterday's Classics, at that time, the 90s and 2K hits as well as Easy Listening and Smooth Jazz added to its playlists. The program later axed and was replaced by another program, Delightful Classics.

Richard Enriquez later transferred to GMA Network's flagship AM radio station, Super Radyo DZBB and there he hosted the program Golden Memories (similar to the former Moonlight Serenade) until October 21, 2023. He later died at the age of 59, due to hypovolemic shock secondary to ruptured aortic aneurysm.

== See also ==
- DZMM TeleRadyo
- DZMM
- Remember When
