= DZMM =

Defunct radio station in Metro Manila, Philippines

- Final logo of DZMM 630
- Quezon City; Philippines
- Broadcast area: Mega Manila and surrounding areas
- Frequency: 630 kHz

Ownership
- Owner: ABS-CBN Corporation (1953–1972, 1986–2020); Radio Philippines Network (1973–1986)
- Sister stations: DWRR-FM; DWWX-TV; DWAC-TV

History
- First air date: October 19, 1953; 73 years ago (as DZAQ 620/960); 1956 (DZXL 960/620, DZYK, DZWL, DZMY, DZYL, DWWW, DZOA, and the first iteration of DZMM); 1973 (as DWWW 620); 1978 (as DWWW 630); July 22, 1986; 40 years ago (as DZMM 630); June 30, 2023 (as DWPM Radyo 630 under PCMC); May 29, 2025 (as DZMM Radyo Patrol and DZMM TeleRadyo under PCMC)
- Last air date: September 23, 1972 (DZAQ, DZXL, DZYK, DZQL, DZMY, DZYL, DWWW, DZOA, and the first iteration of DZMM); February 24, 1986 (as DWWW); May 5, 2020 (as DZMM)
- Former call signs: DZAQ 620/960 (1953–1972); DZXL 960/620 (1956–1972); DWWW 620/630 (1973–1986)
- Former frequencies: 620 kHz (1953–1972, 1973–1978); 960 kHz (1956–1972); 830 kHz (1956–1972); 1160 kHz (1956–1972); 1280 kHz (1956–1972); 1340 kHz (1956–1972); 1000 kHz (1956–1972)
- Call sign meaning: Malayang Mamamayan (former branding) or Mega Manila

Technical information
- Licensing authority: NTC

DZMM (630 AM) was a commercial radio station owned and operated by ABS-CBN Corporation. The station's studio was located in the ABS-CBN Broadcasting Center, corner of Sgt. Esguerra Avenue and Mother Ignacia Street in Brgy. South Triangle, Diliman, Quezon City, with its 50,000 watt transmitter located at F. Navarette Street, Brgy. Panghulo, Obando, Bulacan. Select programming from the station was also simulcast via satellite over various regional stations, including Puerto Princesa, Cebu, and in Davao City. In 2007 DZMM launched DZMM TeleRadyo, a namesake TV channel which simulcast the radio station and a video feed from the studio.

DZMM went off the air on May 5, 2020 following the expiration of ABS-CBN's legislative franchise to operate terrestrial television and radio stations. Most of the station's programming resumed three days later through the TeleRadyo channel and as an online feed.

In 2023, the 630 AM frequency was awarded to the Philippine Collective Media Corporation; PCMC subsequently entered into a joint venture with ABS-CBN to co-produce programming for the new station, which would be known as DWPM, and initially branded as Radyo 630. On May 29. 2025, just over five years after the original closure, DWPM revived the DZMM Radyo Patrol branding as part of a relaunch, while also reviving multiple programs from the original DZMM. Despite its use of the DZMM branding, the station's call letters remain DWPM.

== History ==
=== First iteration: 1953–72 ===
DZMM can trace its roots back through its direct forerunner DZAQ to the pre-1953 experimental station DZBC, which used the Filipino language in its broadcasts instead of the English lingua franca dominant on other stations at that time. DZAQ itself was established on October 19, 1953 as the first radio station of the former Alto Broadcasting System (ABS), then owned by the Quirino family under President Elpidio Quirino's brother Antonio. DZAQ 620 kHz featured news, variety, and music programs on the then-standard AM format and served as the progenitor for DZAQ-TV 3, with Eddie Ilarde, Ike Lozada, German Moreno, and Joey de Leon being some of the station's best-known personalities. Its first radio studios in Aduana, Intramuros, Manila shared the same building as the television studios until 1957, when the DZAQ radio studios moved to the then-new ABS radio and television studios in Pasay.

When ABS and the Lopez-owned Chronicle Broadcasting Network (CBN) formally merged into a single network in 1967, DZAQ 620 kHz switched frequencies with CBN-owned DZXL 960 kHz and was rebranded as DZAQ Radyo Patrol 960 kHz, becoming one of ABS-CBN's pre-martial law flagship AM stations. Ben Aniceto and Orly Mercado – the station manager from 1969 to 1971 – together came up with a vision to establish a 24-hour all-news/talk radio station and ABS-CBN agreed. Putting it under the Radyo Patrol brand – the successor to the 24 hour news station DZQL Radyo Reloj which CBN had launched in 1956 – DZAQ Radyo Patrol became the first 24-hour news radio station anywhere in Southeast Asia.

The first and original Radyo Patrol team was hastily organized in 1967 in the aftermath of Super Typhoon Welming (international name: Emma) when then-program manager Ben Aniceto and chief engineer Emilio Solidum found a way to broadcast typhoon damage news from Manila and the surrounding areas. They dispatched Volkswagen Kombis fitted with UHF transmitters, Kombi One with Al Mendez and Zoilo Paragas Jr as reporters and Kombi 2 with Bar Samson. DZQL and DZXL became the carrying stations for their news reports, with then-DJs Naldy Castro, Buddy Medina, Boots Baker, Mary Jane Madamba, and Ike Lozada alternating as anchors, and Cesar Mortega coordinating the broadcasts. It proved to be a huge success for the corporation, and for its news service.

The magnitude 7.6 earthquake in Casiguran on August 2, 1968 which severely affected Manila and led to the collapse of the Ruby Tower in the capital's downtown district was the second major news event that was a progenitor of the current Radyo Patrol. DZAQ again took on the task of informing the nation live as it happened, with the coordination handled by former DZAQ station manager Orly Mercado and veteran broadcaster Joe Taruc, and the first reporters assigned to Radyo Patrol being Mercado himself, Jun Ricafrente, Mario Garcia, Cris Daluz, and Ismael Reyes. This marathon radio-TV simulcast of a major event was the first of its kind by Philippine media and was a great success. The Radyo Patrol format later became an integral part of DZAQ's broadcasts, with the station's field reporters being assigned to cover breaking news stories and then calling in to the station to convey those stories as they happened.

Encouraged by the success of the field reports on breaking news stories in the Greater Manila Area and beyond, DZAQ later converted into a 24-hour uninterrupted news and commentary station covering national events of importance. At the same time the original team of five field reporters was expanded to include young announcers like Rey Langit, Ernie Baron, and Manolo Favis alongside industry news veterans. By 1971 the success of the Radyo Patrol format in the Greater Manila Area had led to select ABS-CBN provincial radio stations establishing Radyo Patrol news services within their own areas.

=== Martial law period: 1972–86 ===
The operations of DZAQ, DZXL, DZYK-FM, DZAQ-TV, DZXL-TV and 4 other ABS-CBN AM radio stations were halted during the night of September 23, 1972 when Metrocom forces seized ABS-CBN Broadcasting Center two days after President Ferdinand Marcos declared martial law. Some DZAQ and DZXL personalities were arrested because of the strict censorship as the stations went off the air.

DWWX-AM 620 of the Banahaw Broadcasting Corporation (BBC) took over the frequency in 1973, thirteen months after all radio and television stations were shut down under martial law. In response to the NTC law that broadcasters could have only one station per market, BBC took DWWX off the air in 1975, instead focusing on its other station DWWA 1160. Meanwhile, DWWW Radyo Broadcast City, an AM station of the Kanlaon Broadcasting System now known as Radio Philippines Network (KBS/RPN) went on air in 1973 with news, public service programs, drama, and music, with veteran anchors and new recruits like Johnny de Leon, Rod Navarro, Joe Taruc,and Vic Morales joining DWWW at that time. Dely Magpayo, Henry Jones Ragas, Gel Santos-Relos, Julie Fe Navarro, Bert "Tawa" Marcelo, and Noli de Castro were among those who worked as station announcers.

Under KBS/RPN control the station was dubbed Pinakamatatag sa Buong Pilipinas (lit. transl. The Strongest in the Entire Philippines). Back then its frequency was 1280 kHz, but later in 1975 it migrated to 620 kHz after the shutdown of DWWX-AM. Following the switch on November 23, 1978 of the Philippine AM radio bandplan from the NARBA-implemented 10 kHz spacing (used from 1922 until November 22, 1978) to the GE75-implemented 9 kHz spacing, DWWW's frequency was reassigned from 620 to 630 AM, and the station gained a new home at Broadcast City in Diliman, Quezon City, Metro Manila.

Following the capture of MBS 4 on the morning of February 24, 1986 and RPN 9 the day after, on the third day of the 1986 EDSA Revolution reformist soldiers stormed into the RPN broadcasting complex and took DWWW off the air. Following Cory Aquino's accession to the presidency both RPN's DWWW and BBC'sDWWK-FM were sequestered by the government, with the then-newly formed Presidential Commission on Good Government handing back the two radio stations to ABS-CBN in April 1986.

=== Second iteration: 1986–2016 ===
2009–2013 logo of DZMM Radyo Patrol 630 under ABS-CBN

==== Preparations and re-launch: 1986 ====
After DWWW's handback to ABS-CBN the station changed its callsign to DZMM and began preparations for the resumption of broadcasts. Vice-president for radio Lito Balquiedra Jr., Mr. Ben Aniceto, and attorney Jake Lopez (a member of the ABS-CBN news teams of the 60s and early 70s) together spearheaded the station's preparations and launch, recruiting a new generation of Radyo Patrol reporters alongside experienced employees. After days of careful planning a test broadcast took place from July 16th to July 21st, 1986 alongside DWKO-FM 101.9 and the network's mother TV station ABS-CBN Channel 2, which re-opened on September 14.

DZMM officially went on air at 3pm on July 22, 1986, broadcasting from its studios in the Chronicle Building in Pasig with the new tagline "Ang Himpilan ng Malayang Mamamayan" (transl. Station of the Free People). Rene Jose delivered the first sign-on spiels, Magpayo was the first ever anchor with her program Dear Tiya Dely, and other early broadcast icons included Jun Ricafrente, Cesar Mortega, Ernie Baron, Kuya Cesar, Ric Tierro, and de Castro, as well as newly recruited female hosts Mel Tiangco and Angelique Lazo. The first full-length program the station launched was Knowledge Power, the country's first-ever scholastic program on AM radio. Months after the station's reopening, Mario Garcia, part of the original Radyo Patrol core, became the first station manager.

==== First fifteen years: 1986–1991 ====
During its first years of operations DZMM maintained a 19 to 20-hours-a-day schedule throughout the week, transferring from the former Chronicle Building in Ortigas Center, Pasig to the ABS-CBN Broadcast Center in Quezon City in 1987. That same year the first-ever tandem presenting on local AM radio was introduced in Mel & Jay, hosted by Mel Tiangco and Jay Sonza. It was also the year in which DZMM gradually built a remarkable roster of radio talents, including Ted Failon, Korina Sanchez, Frankie Evangelista, Gel Santos-Relos, Neil Ocampo, Jake Maderazo, and Ernie Angeles, the latter also serving as the station's voiceover announcer during its first decade of operations.

DZMM maintained the tradition of the ABS-CBN Radyo Patrol field reporters of the 1960s and early 1970s so as to develop the station's public service capabilities. One of the original members of the team, Radyo Patrol #3 Jun Ricafrente, started training new recruits, with the first of the second generation of reporters to be selected being Radyo Patrol #2 Claude Vitug, Radyo Patrol #4 Emil Recometa, Radyo Patrol #1 Lito Villarosa, and Radyo Patrol #5 Neil Ocampo. And when military insurgents tried to take over the station during the 1987 coup attempt, the plan was thwarted by moving the booth to an undisclosed location where it immediately resumed broadcasting.

Keeping up with the demands of delivering news to listeners, DZMM eventually evolved into a 24-hour round-the-clock broadcast service in 1989. Ted Failon joined DZMM's roster of broadcasters the following year with Gising Pilipinas, originally known as Good Morning Pilipinas but unrelated to the now defunct morning show that aired on PTV. Known for his outside-the-box broadcasting style, Failon changed the landscape of Philippine radio broadcasting as he aired from 2 am to 4 am on weekdays.

During the late 1980s and the early 1990s the station's notable news coverages included the Mendiola riot, the August 1987 coup, Supertyphoon Sisang, the Doña Paz sinking, the death of Ferdinand Marcos, the December 1989 Christmas coup, the Luzon earthquake, the 1991 eruption of Mount Pinatubo, and the Gulf War. ABS-CBN News reporters witnessed all of these events and made them available to listeners on AM radio, a source of pride for the station as it received great acclaim from the public for its ability to deliver live, accurate reporting of breaking news stories.

==== New initiatives: 1991–1998 ====
In 1991 DZMM created Aksyon Ngayon, the first-ever program on AM radio devoted solely to public service. Initially anchored by Korina Sanchez and Ted Failon, Aksyon Ngayon instantly soared to the top of the ratings list. Because of the thousands of less-fortunate listeners asking for assistance from the program the station's executives decided to create the DZMM Public Service Center, the first-ever separate office created exclusively for public service by a local AM station.

On November 5, 1993 DZMM launched Pulis, Pulis Kung Umaksiyon, Mabilis, anchored by broadcast icons Noli de Castro, Jay Sonza, and Mel Tiangco, and created to keep the public informed on the activities of the Philippine National Police. It also became a venue for comments and grievances from the listening public on issues concerning law enforcers.

In 1996 DZMM became the first AM station in the Philippines to be made available on the World Wide Web via its inclusion in the ABS-CBN website. All the station's programs were broadcast live and could be heard around the world via The Filipino Channel (TFC).

In 1998 DZMM re-launched Himpilan ng Malayang Mamamayan as DZMM Radyo Patrol 630 under the leadership of de Castro, ABS-CBN's then-vice president for radio. On September 14, 1998 ABS-CBN Sky Patrol was launched. Anchored by Ricky Velasco and employing the first-ever news helicopter in the country, Sky Patrol changed the way of delivering and gathering news. ABS-CBN Sky Patrol's helicopter served DZMM, ABS-CBN, and the ABS-CBN News Channel until 2017, when it was replaced by video drones.

By the end of 1999 DZMM had moved its transmitting facilities from Libis, Caloocan to state-of-the-art 50,000 watt transmission equipment in Obando, Bulacan.

==== Second fifteen years: 2001–16 ====
In 2001 DZMM celebrated its 15th year on-air by adopting what would become its long-lasting motto, "Una sa Balita, Una sa Public Service" (First in News, First in Public Service), also tapping the power of text messaging with its introduction of DZMM TxtPatrol. The sports-oriented program Sports Talk was also launched that year, winning the Catholic Mass Media Awards's Best Sports Program award in its first year, and was renamed as Fastbreak in 2014. DZMM's trademark drama theatre aired on weekday afternoons, changing the way people perceived radio drama by featuring the real life-stories of DZMM anchors like Bro. Jun Banaag, O.P., Joey Galvez, Alfredo Lim, and others. However, that year also saw de Castro depart the station in order to run for and ultimately win a Senate race, with Ted Failon also winning the Congressional seat for Leyte.

In July 2004 the station made history when the final five episodes of the TV drama series "Sana'y Wala Nang Wakas" were simulcast from ABS-CBN in audio format, with separate commercials for radio listeners.

In 2006 DZMM celebrated its 20th anniversary at the Araneta Coliseum, with Sharon Cuneta giving a different twist to the now-iconic station jingle. And on February 7, 2006 SikaPinoy was conferred with the Anvil Award of Merit by the Public Relations Society of the Philippines (PRSP).

DZMM TeleRadyo first signed on in 2007 via SkyCable channel 22 (later channel 26), then later expanded onto other cable providers, eventually becoming an exclusive news channel on digital free TV on ABS-CBN TVplus. This arrangement lasted until June 30, 2020, but was later reintroduced under the PRTV Prime Media feed on May 29, 2025.

In 2010 DZMM and its rival station DZBB of the GMA Network made history as they joined forces in the name of public service. DZMM's now defunct Aksyon Ngayon program broadcast James and Jesus Bantillan asking for help in finding their missing parents Pascual and Norma, with the family eventually reunited via DZBB's also now defunct rival program Aksyon Oro Mismo.

On February 25, 2011 DZMM introduced their tagline Silveradyo (a portmanteau of silver and radio) to celebrate the station's 25th anniversary. A fun run named Takbo Para sa Karunungan (transl. Run for Literacy) was held at the Quirino Grandstand on March 13, 2011, and a DZMM trade event was held at One Esplanade in the SM Mall of Asia complex in May 2011. And on June 12 the new station ID was launched for the station's 25th anniversary, with the Philippine Philharmonic Orchestra, UP Concert Chorus, Erik Santos, and Angeline Quinto performing the iconic anthem.

In 2012 DZMM launched Red Alert to help ordinary citizens to prepare for natural calamities. The program went off the air temporarily, but returned in 2013 after the onslaught of Typhoon Yolanda (Haiyan). The program subsequently became popular for its slogan Ligtas ang May Alam, holding contests like Alert U, hosting the Red Alert Emergency Expo, and becoming a TV program as a segment in Pinoy True Stories every Wednesday. The radio program later won a Philippine Quill Award and a Hildegarde Award.

In 2013 Radyo Patrol #24 Jun Lingcoran was appointed as the chief of Radyo patrol reporters, and served in his position until he retired in 2015.

On April 19, 2016 the DZMM's website (dzmm.abs-cbnnews.com) was hacked, with both Bloodsec International and Anonymous Philippines claiming responsibility. The hacking took place days before the final PiliPinas presidential debates in Pangasinan – hosted by ABS-CBN – and was also related to Anonymous Philippines' COMELEC hacking. The text posted by the hackers on that website said "our minds are constantly being invaded by legions of half-truths, prejudices, and false facts and the great need of mankind is to be lifted above the morass of false propaganda". The hacking did not affect social media accounts nor the operations of TeleRadyo and the main station, but did affect live streaming. The hacked website was later taken down by the mother network ABS-CBN and replaced by a message that the site was down due to heavy traffic. Days later traffic to the site was redirected to the main page of ABS-CBN News, and was later replaced with a newer DZMM website (news.abs-cbn.com/dzmm/home).

=== 30th anniversary: 2016 ===
In 2016 DZMM celebrated its 30th anniversary on the airwaves and introduced a new slogan, "Balita, Public Service, Tatlong Dekada". A new music video performed by Kapamilya actor and singer Piolo Pascual was launched during Isang Pamilya Tayo: The ABS-CBN Flag Raising Ceremony held on June 12, Philippine Independence Day. Another music video of the new station ID was premiered on July 1 after TV Patrol on ABS-CBN, ABS-CBN HD, and DZMM TeleRadyo, with DZMM TeleRadyo launching a refurbished datascreen the day after. An audio-only edition of the new station ID was also broadcast on DZMM and its live streaming platform.

On July 22, 2016 – exactly 30 years after its first sign-on – DZMM aired its anniversary special Kuwento ng Tatlong Dekada (transl. [The] Story of Three Decades) in a number of sections. An interview section saw former and present Radyo Patrol reporters #12 Rod Izon, #2 Claude Vitug, #26 Dindo Amparo, and #38 Noel Alamar recalling the most notable stories of the past 30 years. Their experiences were aired with Noli de Castro on Kabayan, with the most notable stories aired in between or within shows such as Dr. Love Radio Show, Tandem: Lima at Oro, Dos Por Dos, Failon Ngayon sa DZMM, Pasada Sais Trenta, Todo-Todo Walang Preno, Aksyon Ngayon, Sakto, O.M.J., Magandang Morning, Teka Muna, Usapang de Campanilla, S.R.O.: Suhestiyon, Reaksyon at Opinyon, Ito ang Radyo Patrol, Radyo Patrol Balita Linggo, and Omaga-Diaz Report. A Grand Kapamilya Day was held in San Andres Sports Complex in Malate, Manila as part of the anniversary festivities. Opened and hosted by ABS-CBN Integrated News and Current Affairs head Ging Reyes, it also saw the launch of DZMM's first outside broadcast news van, to be used for breaking news and special coverages.

The 30th anniversary was capped off with a grand celebration on October 4, 2016 at the Marriott Grand Ballroom, Pasay, and a documentary special 30 630 (Trenta Sais Trenta): Kwento ng DZMM narrated by Vic de Leon Lima aired on October 9 on ABS-CBN's Sunday's Best. It was replayed on October 10 and 15 on DZMM, DZMM TeleRadyo, and news.abs-cbn.com/dzmm/home, again on November 6 on Jeepney TV, and on all the above-mentioned DZMM platforms on December 30, 2016.

=== Expansion of programming: 2017–2020 ===
In March 2017 DZMM and DZMM TeleRadyo launched DZMM Kapamilya Day to celebrate ten years on television as well as to continue the 30th anniversary celebrations of their radio presence. With the launch of Kapamilya Day most of its weekday and some of its weekend programming was broadcast live in different parts of Metro Manila and in select areas in Laguna, Cavite, and Bulacan. Kapamilya Day ended in June 2017, but returned in January 2018.

On April 17, 2017 DZMM and DZMM TeleRadyo underwent programming changes for the relaunch of the ABS-CBN's late-night newscast Bandila, which became a standalone broadcast for both DZMM and DZMM TeleRadyo. Before 2011 it had been simulcast on a slightly delayed basis on DZMM and DZMM TeleRadyo, and due to the change, Mismo moved to the later timeslot of 10:30 p.m.

On June 16, 2017 Dr. Love: Always and Forever, Magandang Gabi Dok, and Radyo Patrol Balita: Alas Kwatro aired their final broadcasts to give way to new programming. Two days later DZMM launched the three replacement programs Good Vibes, On the Spot, and Wow Trending, with the latter program only airing on the station to fill a gap in TeleRadyo's broadcast of ABS-CBN's weekend programming. Due to the change, MMK sa DZMM moved to the later timeslot of 2:00 p.m. and Usapang de Campanilla moved to the earlier timeslot of 8:30 p.m.. Headline Pilipinas and ABS-CBN's late-night programming began simulcasting on DZMM after previously only being available on TeleRadyo. Mismo was renamed Showbuzz, then Showbiz Sidelines, and now Alam na This!, which was also a showbiz news segment for Radyo Patrol Balita: Alas Dose and then Headline Pilipinas. That same day the station also launched a new studio for its weekday programs Good Vibes, Sakto, On the Spot, and Todo-Todo Walang Preno.

On July 3, 2017 DZMM launched a new station ID and jingle with the theme Una Ka Pilipino (transl. You Are First, Filipino), with DZMM's weekday morning lifestyle program Sakto updating its title card on DZMM TeleRadyo the same day.

On January 18, 2018 long-time Sa Kabukiran anchor Ka Louie Tabing died of a heart attack. Dexter Ganibe replaced him as the new host of the program until 2019, when he was replaced by Rod Izon.

On February 3, 2018 the Saturday edition of Yesterday aired its final broadcast to give way to two new programs: Songhits: Tunog Pinoy and Healthy Sabado, then hosted by Dr. Harris Acero and Aida Gonzales, and later by Jing Castañeda. On February 4 DZMM launched its new program Konek-Todo, hosted by Mare Yao and presidential spokesperson Secretary Harry Roque. Airing at 8:00 p.m., it replaced the last 30 minutes of Chismax and the first 30 minutes of Salitang Buhay, requiring Salitang Buhay to move to the later timeslot of 9:00 p.m.

On April 8, 2018 DZMM launched its new program Tulong Ko, Pasa Mo, hosted by the power couple Vic and Avelynn Garcia and replacing Radyo Patrol Balita Linggo. It originally aired on DZAS 702 and Radyo5 92.3 News FM in 2016, but transferred to DZMM, airing every Sunday at 11:00 a.m. And on June 2, 2018 DZMM launched Kape at Salita, hosted by Bo Sanchez, Randy Borromeo, Alvin Barcelona, and Rissa Singson-Kawpeng, replacing the last hour of the Saturday edition of Sa Kabukiran. The program aired every Saturday from 5:00 a.m. to 6:00 a.m. and was simulcast on ABS-CBN from 5:30 a.m. to 6:00 a.m.

On October 15, 2018 the DZMM programs Pasada Sais Trenta and weekday morning lifestyle program Sakto introduced new host Kim Atienza – who replaced original host Marc Logan, who had left DZMM's Sakto in September 2018 to replace David Oro on the Saturday morning program Tandem – alongside former Teka Muna anchors Peter Musñgi and Pat-P Daza, who replaced original hosts Karen Davila (2017) and Vic Lima (2018). Sakto updated its title card once again, and Pasada Sais Trenta (also known as Pasada 630) also updated its title card on DZMM TeleRadyo. On November 10 Teka Muna aired its final episode to give way to the 30-minute extension of S.O.C.O. and Radyo Negosyo moved to an earlier timeslot of 7:30 p.m. On November 24 DZMM launched its new program Haybol Pinoy, replacing Songhits: Tunog Pinoy. It originally aired from 1992 to 2004 and is now hosted by Tina Marasigan and Atty. Terry Ridon.

On February 17, 2019 DZMM launched its new program Magsasaka TV, hosted by Jeff Hernaez and Dexter Villamin. Airing every Sunday from 5:00 a.m. to 6:00 a.m. it replaced the last hour of the Sunday edition of Sa Kabukiran. On March 24 DZMM launched its new program Pinoy Panalo Ka!, hosted by Mare Yao and DJ Chacha, which replaced Konek-Todo after its final broadcast on January 27, 2019. Also airing at 8:00 p.m after Konek-Todo was temporarily replaced by ABS-CBN News documentaries, Pinoy Panalo Ka! tackles important issues in the country, airing solutions from appropriate authorities as well as facts, trivia, and inspiring stories.

On May 17, 2019 Bandila sa DZMM aired its final episode to give way to ABS-CBN's current affairs programs, along with S.R.O. extending for 30 minutes and Usapang de Campanilla going back to its original timeslots of 9:00 p.m. to 10:00 p.m. and 9:00 p.m. to 9:30 p.m. on DZMM TeleRadyo. Due to the change MMK Klasiks was moved to the later timeslot of 9:30 p.m. on DZMM TeleRadyo.

On June 22, 2019 DZMM launched its new program Good Job!, replacing Haybol Pinoy, which aired its final broadcast on June 8. Temporarily replaced by the two replayed ABS-CBN midnight programs My Puhunan and Mission Possible, it was hosted by Rica Lazo and former ABS-CBN Europe news bureau chief Danny Buenafe. On July 19 Radyo Patrol Balita Alas-Dose aired its final episode to give way to the expansion of Headline Pilipinas which moved to an earlier timeslot of 12:00 p.m. And on October 16 Bandila once again aired on DZMM to cover the Magnitude 6.3 Earthquake that hit Tulunan, Cotabato, simulcasting with ABS-CBN Channel 2. The airing time of 11:15 pm pushed back Bro. Jun Banaag’s Dr. Love Radio Show by 30 minutes.

On January 27, 2020 DZMM refurbished the title cards of most DZMM programs, including Failon Ngayon sa DZMM, Garantisadong Balita, Radyo Patrol Balita, Gising Pilipinas, Kabayan, Good Vibes, Todo-Todo Walang Preno, Balita Ngayon, S.O.C.O. sa DZMM, On the Spot, Dos por Dos, S.R.O.: Suhestiyon, Reaksyon at Opinyon, and Pasada Sais Trenta. On February 14, just in time for Valentine's Day, DZMM launched its new program LOL: Labor of Love,, hosted by Arnell Ignacio and Rica Lazo. Airing on Friday nights from 9:00 p.m. to 10:00 p.m. it replaced the Friday edition of Usapang de Campanilla as well as MMK Klasiks on DZMM TeleRadyo.

On February 15, 2020 DZMM launched its new program Usapang Kalye, hosted by Tim Orbos and Tina Marasigan, airing every Saturday from 1:00 p.m. to 2:00 p.m. and replacing Healthy Sabado. On the same day Headline Pilipinas started airing on weekends, replacing Radyo Patrol Balita Alas-Dose Weekend and Ito ang Radyo Patrol, which ended on February 8. However, it was now set in a DZMM studio and introduced weekend anchors Joyce Balancio and Ricky Rosales on Saturdays and Adrian Ayalin and Raya Capulong on Sundays. The Saturday edition ran for a full hour like the weekday editions, but the Sunday edition could only run 30 minutes since Yesterday aired at 12:30pm. And on February 16 Chismax and Salitang Buhay both reverted to their original timeslots of 7:00 p.m. to 8:30 p.m. and 8:30 p.m. to 10:00 p.m. respectively, replacing Pinoy, Panalo Ka!.

On March 14, 2020 DZMM launched its new program Kuwentuhang Lokal, hosted by Jay Ruiz, DILG Sec. Eduardo Año, Usec. Jonathan Malaya, and Raya Capulong, replacing Turo-Turo every Saturday from 5:00 p.m. to 6:00 p.m. And on March 15 DZMM's music program Remember When introduced new program host DJ Reggie Valdez, who replaced the original host Norma Marco after she left the show in February 2020.

=== COVID-19 and forced shutdown: 2020 ===
On March 18, 2020 ABS-CBN revived its DZMM weekday morning line-up for the first time in years, temporarily replacing Umagang Kay Ganda and all ABS-CBN regional morning programs, which were ordered to halt in order to support government efforts to fight COVID-19. This led to the nationwide television simulcasts of Garantisadong Balita, Kabayan, and Radyo Patrol Balita Alas Siyete. As an emergency measure on the same day, the ABS-CBN News Channel (ANC) temporarily simulcast DZMM programs to local and international viewers but with their own commercials, only breaking away from them for the English-language flagship newscast Top Story. On March 19 DZMM formally stopped the replay broadcasts of ABS-CBN news and current affairs programming at 1:00 p.m., which had commenced after the temporary halt of broadcasts of Good Vibes, and replaced them with a simulcast from ANC.

With this unprecedented decision, DZMM became the first radio station since the end of English broadcasts on DZRJ in the 2010s to air English-language news programming on the AM band. By extension, DZMM TeleRadyo became a pioneer in airing bilingual Filipino and English news programming in both cable and digital free-to-air television. The English broadcasts aired from 1:00 p.m. to 10:00 p.m. Tuesdays, Thursdays, and Sundays, with ANC's relay of DZMM programs on Mondays, Wednesdays, Fridays, and Saturdays. Mondays, Wednesdays, and Fridays the relay ran from 8:00 a.m. to 10:00 p.m., following Early Edition, with a break at 9:00 a.m. for Market Edge during trading days in the Philippine Stock Exchange and at 5:00 p.m. for Top Story. With this programming strategy, DZMM TeleRadyo aired The World Tonight for the first time on digital television on Tuesday, Thursday, and Sunday nights, taking a 6:30 p.m. break for the simulcast of TV Patrol on weekdays only. After 10:00 p.m. DZMM 630 switched to a hookup with sister station MOR 101.9, while TeleRadyo continued its simulcast of ANC regardless of schedule.

On March 20, 2020, DZMM made history with the use of Zoom videotelephony software for the Friday night broadcasts of Labor of Love and the Saturday afternoon broadcasts of Usapang Kalye, Good Job, and the Omaga-Diaz Report simulcast on ANC, making it a pioneer among the country's news channels. On March 22 DZMM TeleRadyo also provisionally moved to full 24/7 broadcasts on digital free-to-air and cable, with ANC programming aired on Sunday late nights until 4:30 a.m. on Mondays. And on March 25 Headline Pilipinas aired for 90 minutes on DZMM TeleRadyo (and on ANC on Mondays, Wednesdays, and Fridays) instead of the usual full hour.

On April 1, 2020 Kuwentuhang Lokal and Pasada 630 became the first DZMM programs to be aired in their entirety using the Zoom platform. On the same day DZMM Radyo Patrol 630 and DZMM TeleRadyo switched to a simultaneous telecast with the English-language ANC, starting at 10:00 p.m.. This was due to DZMM temporarily suspending its regular in-studio programming after requiring on-duty personnel to go on self-quarantine for 14 days following their exposure to two suspected coronavirus cases. The studio and facilities of DZMM were vacated and immediately disinfected, with those not exposed asked to work from home. With this move, DZMM, DZMM TeleRadyo, and the provincial regional AM radio stations became English-only as a provisional measure, airing the best of ANC and its current affairs programming from 5:30 p.m. to 10:00 p.m., with a 6:30 p.m. break for TV Patrol. On April 3, 2020 DZMM Radyo Patrol 630 and DZMM TeleRadyo resumed transmission, with all programming aired via the Zoom platform and with DZMM TeleRadyo sharing infrastructure, graphics, and commercials from ANC.

Between April 9 and 11, 2020 a partnership with the Church of Jesus Christ of Latter-day Saints in the Philippines enabled the 190th General Conference of the Church of Jesus Christ of Latter-Day Saints at the Conference Center in Temple Square, Salt Lake City, Utah, USA to be broadcast countrywide on both free-to-air and cable via DZMM TeleRadyo. Necessitated by the effects of the enhanced community quarantine in Luzon and many other provinces, it marked the first time such a broadcast had ever been done via satellite relay and the first time the Conference had aired on Philippine television. All the broadcasts on DZMM TeleRadyo were simulcast on ANC as well.

On April 13, 2020 commercial feeds for ANC and DZMM TeleRadyo for Mondays, Wednesdays, Fridays, and Saturdays resumed independently-managed playouts after days of using a single commercial feed. DZMM and DZMM TeleRadyo resumed the use of the radio studios following disinfection measures, with SRO: Suhestyon, Reaksyon at Opinion the first broadcast to be aired. And on April 20 the four weeks of timesharing programming with both DZMM TeleRadyo and ANC ended, with ANC resuming its programming on Mondays and DZMM slowly resuming operations from the radio studios, though some programs were still produced through Zoom. On the same day, Headline Pilipinas extended its time slot on DZMM TeleRadyo from 12:15 p.m. to 2:00 p.m. in order to accommodate more national and local reports. However, the overnight simulcasts on MOR 101.9 (for radio) and ANC (for DZMM TeleRadyo) were retained, following the Dr. Love Radio Show which started at 11:00pm.

On May 5, 2020 DZMM, ABS-CBN, S+A, and MOR Philippines were ordered by the NTC to go off air due to the expiration of their franchises the day before. At 8:20 pm, DZMM and DZMM TeleRadyo temporarily went off the air following S.R.O.: Suhestyon, Reaksyon at Opinyon. But on May 7 ABS-CBN filed a motion for a temporary restraining order with the Supreme Court of the Philippines to stop the implementation of the NTC's cease-and-desist order and to allow DZMM and other ABS-CBN TV and radio stations to return to the airwaves whilst proceedings related to its franchise renewal were ongoing. The pending franchise renewal bill was eventually rejected by the Congressional Committee on Legislative Franchises on July 10, 2020, with ABS-CBN's broadcast frequencies – including the 630 kHz AM frequency – being recalled in September 2020 by the NTC, resulting in DZMM and DZMM TeleRadyo going off the air, seemingly permanently.

=== Third iteration: 2020–2023 ===
At 5:00 a.m. on May 8, 2020, DZMM's television counterpart DZMM TeleRadyo resumed operations under the revived name TeleRadyo, debuting a refreshed logo and updated station bumpers, the short clips that go between programming and commercials. On the same day DZMM's flagship commentary program Pasada 630 was rebranded as Pasada sa TeleRadyo to reflect the channel's new identity. However, the DZMM branding initially remained on the station bumper and the old DZMM TeleRadyo logo briefly reappeared shortly thereafter. DZMM's online audio stream was also restored simultaneously, signaling a broader return to operations. By May 10 the new TeleRadyo logo and bumper were officially adopted for permanent use, marking the full transition to the updated brand.

On May 13, 2020 the House of Representatives approved the second reading of a bill granting ABS-CBN a provisional franchise and allowing DZMM-AM to resume broadcasting until October 31, 2020. On May 17 TeleRadyo launched its first new program, Lingkod Aksyon, a Sunday morning public service show co-produced with the Philippine Red Cross and hosted by Henry Omaga-Diaz and Senator Richard J. Gordon, temporarily replacing Ma-Beauty Po Naman. On June 10, Lingkod Kapamilya sa TeleRadyo, hosted by Bernadette Sembrano and Julius Babao, was extended to two hours from 10 a.m. to 12 p.m.. On March 17 it had replaced Sakto temporarily in the 10 a.m. slot in order to accommodate PTV's Public Briefing #LagingHandaPH until June 9. And on June 16 the health and infotainment program Good Vibes returned to the airwaves, this time on TeleRadyo with remote hosting by Niña Corpuz, Ahwel Paz, and Dr. Luisa Puyat. The program replaced the 2:00 p.m. edition of TeleRadyo's special coverage of the COVID-19 pandemic.

On July 31, 2020 Dos por Dos and Garantisadong Balita aired their final episodes following the announcement by hosts Gerry Baja and Anthony Taberna that they would be leaving ABS-CBN. Garantisadong Balita was subsequently replaced by the Kapamilya Daily Mass, simulcast on Kapamilya Channel except for Saturdays, while Dos por Dos was succeeded by the expanded edition of Pasada sa TeleRadyo. Between August 22nd and 31st several TeleRadyo programs ended: Tandem: Lima at Logan, Magpayo Nga Kayo, Red Alert sa TeleRadyo, Dra. Bles @ Ur Serbis, Todo-Todo Walang Preno, Good Vibes, and the weekday Dr. Love Radio Show. On August 31 Failon Ngayon sa TeleRadyo aired its final episode following Ted Failon and DJ Chacha's departure from ABS-CBN, and was replaced by On the Spot.

On September 21, 2020 Kabayan moved to an 8:00 a.m. timeslot with a one-hour runtime to make way for Gising Pilipinas at 6:00 a.m., temporarily ending its simulcast on Kapamilya Channel until October 23. On October 26 Sakto returned to TeleRadyo with new hosts Amy Perez, Jeff Canoy, and Johnson Manabat, airing from 6:00 a.m. to 7:30 a.m. and replacing Gising Pilipinas, also resuming being simulcast on Kapamilya Channel. That same day, On the Spot shifted to 9:00 a.m. to 10:30 a.m., preceding Lingkod Kapamilya sa TeleRadyo. And on December 27 Yesterday aired its final episode after 10 years on the station, following Enriquez's moving back to DWDM-FM and later DZBB-AM.

=== Fourth iteration: 2023–2025 ===
Inaugural logo as Radyo 630 used in 2023

Following the 2020 shutdown of the station, on May 23, 2023 ABS-CBN announced that it would enter into a joint venture agreement with Prime Media Holdings, Inc., owned by House Speaker Representative Martin Romualdez. The partnership aimed to produce and supply a variety of programs – including news content – to broadcasters and third-party entities such as Prime Media's Philippine Collective Media Corporation (PCMC), operator of the Favorite Music Radio network. ABS-CBN would hold a minority stake in the newly formed venture, Media Serbisyo Production Corporation (MSPC).

A key component of this collaboration was the planned revival of DZMM on the 630 kHz frequency, now owned by PCMC. This announcement coincided with the planned June 30 closure of ABS-CBN's wholly owned service TeleRadyo, due to financial losses. Instead, TeleRadyo was relaunched as TeleRadyo Serbisyo, now operated by MSPC. On June 26, 2023 630 kHz conducted a test broadcast under the new callsign DWPM, followed by a soft launch on June 30. The station was formally inaugurated as Radyo 630 on July 17, marking ABS-CBN's renewed presence on the AM band through this strategic partnership.

DZMM Radyo Patrol 630 logo in 2025, under MSPC

On May 29, 2025, Radyo 630 was rebranded as DZMM Radyo Patrol 630, marking the revival of the iconic brand after five years' absence. Simultaneously, TeleRadyo Serbisyo was rebranded back to DZMM TeleRadyo, with both platforms continuing operations under Media Serbisyo Production Corporation. Despite the rebranding, DWPM remained the station's callsign.

The relaunch featured a refreshed rendition of DZMM's classic 2005 jingle performed by Martin Nievera, and was headlined by the station's inaugural news bulletin anchored by Johnson Manabat and Alvin Elchico, one of the last voices on air before DZMM's temporary shutdown in 2020. The official relaunch night was held in the Ayala Museum in Makati, the place where the first live update under the newly revived brand also happened.

Most existing Radyo 630 programs were retained during the transition pending a broader programming overhaul on June 2, 2025. This revamp included the return of legacy shows such as the beloved radio drama Maalaala Mo Kaya sa DZMM, the flagship public service program Aksyon Ngayon, and the station's rolling newscast, Radyo Patrol Balita. The Radyo 630 field reporters were retained, with most of the appointments from 2023 becoming the 4th generation of Radyo Patrol reporters.

The return of MMK, alongside the Friday afternoon segment of Ako 'To Si Tyang Amy now called Tyang Amy Presents, marked the return of radio dramas for the first time since 2020. The latter program's production team became the revived official radio drama division of DZMM. On September 1, 2025 a new radio drama program called Kwento Nights made its debut, differing from MMK's in its presentation during its brief run.

Beginning in September 2025, DZMM slowly revived the dual production setup for both itself and DZMM TeleRadyo, supported by ABS-CBN as per its obligations with MSPC. By the time of the relaunch the regular DZMM audio service was carrying Arangkada Balita, a PCMC/PRTV Prime Media co-production with the station and ABS-CBN News, airing at 5:30pm weekdays. Select TeleRadyo-only productions were aired as DZMM TeleRadyo exclusives as was the case before 2020, as well as some DZMM-only productions being simulcast on PRTV Prime Media and its Youtube page.

The return of the DZMM brand, was coupled with the return of broadcasts of the nationally known breaking news coverages, which were familiar to both long time viewers and listeners. The MSPC's partnerships with its co-owners ABS-CBN, PRTV Prime Media, and the PCMC's FMR Radio Network enabled them to work together on coverage during emergencies and other breaking news stories. Not only did advertisements during and in between station programming slowly return in the months after the launch, but at year's end DZMM had returned to the Top 10 – and at times Top 5 – of Metro Manila AM Radio stations, demonstrating a possible increase in popularity of the DZMM.

== Theme music ==
The now-iconic DZMM jingle was first composed in 2005 by Jessie Lasaten, with words by Bing Palao, Robert Labayen, and Peter Musñgi, and sung by Reuben Laurente, a former member of the music group The Company. Peter Musñgi was a former host of Teka Muna, then hosted Pasada Sais Trenta before becoming a consultant for ABS-CBN Sports and the current voiceover of the network. From 1986 to 2004 the station used the jingle of its mother network ABS-CBN as its on-air identification music.

The jingle was recomposed, rearranged, and modified several times, with other singers who performed various renditions including Rachelle Ann Go, Sheryn Regis, Sharon Cuneta (for the 20th anniversary in 2006), Gary Valenciano (Christmas 2006), Jett Pangan of The Dawn (Valentine 2008), Charice (2008, re-used in 2010), Richard Poon (Christmas 2009), Jed Madela (2010), Christian Bautista (Christmas 2010), Erik Santos and Angeline Quinto with the UP Concert Chorus and the Philippine Philharmonic Orchestra (for the 25th anniversary in 2011), Yeng Constantino and Jovit Baldivino (Christmas 2011), Noel Cabangon and Zia Quizon (2012), Nonoy Zuñiga (Christmas 2012), Teddy Corpuz of Rocksteddy (Election 2013), Arnel Pineda (2014), Lani Misalucha (Christmas 2014–2016 and Valentine 2016), Piolo Pascual (for the 30th anniversary in 2016), Regine Velasquez-Alcasid (2018, performed once), and Martin Nievera (currently used since May 29, 2025). The jingle was also sung by on-air personalities in Christmas 2013.

== Personalities ==
=== Final personalities ===
- Anthony Taberna
- Ariel Ureta
- Boyet Sison
- Doris Bigornia
- Jeff Canoy
- Winnie Cordero
- Noli de Castro
- Alvin Elchico
- Kim Atienza
- Tina Marasigan
- Marc Logan
- Julius Babao
- Jun Banaag
- Henry Omaga-Diaz
- Peter Musñgi
- Amy Perez
- Karmina Constantino
- Bernadette Sembrano
- Ganiel Krishnan
- Jing Castañeda
- Ted Failon
- Tony Velasquez

=== Former personalities ===
- Alex Santos
- Alfie Lorenzo
- Ambet Nabus
- Anthony Taberna
- Ariel Ureta
- Arnell Ignacio
- Boots Anson-Roa
- Bo Sanchez
- Boy Abunda
- Ces Oreña-Drilon
- Cheryl Cosim
- Charo Santos-Concio
- Cheche Lazaro
- Claire Castro
- Cory Quirino
- Daniel Razon
- Ernie Baron
- Erwin Tulfo
- Flora Gasser
- Freddie Webb
- Gretchen Fullido
- Gus Abelgas
- Joey Lina
- Karen Davila
- Korina Sanchez
- Lorenzo Tañada III
- Mel Tiangco
- Maricel Laxa
- Mark Leviste
- Manny Castañeda
- Neil Ocampo
- Niña Corpuz
- Ogie Diaz
- Pinky Webb
- Richard Gordon
- Sol Aragones
- Tim Orbos

== See also ==
- ABS-CBN
- ABS-CBN News and Current Affairs
- DWRR-FM
- DZMM TeleRadyo
- DWPM
