= PRTV Prime Media =

Philippine free-to-air television channel

PRTV Manila (PRTV Prime Media)
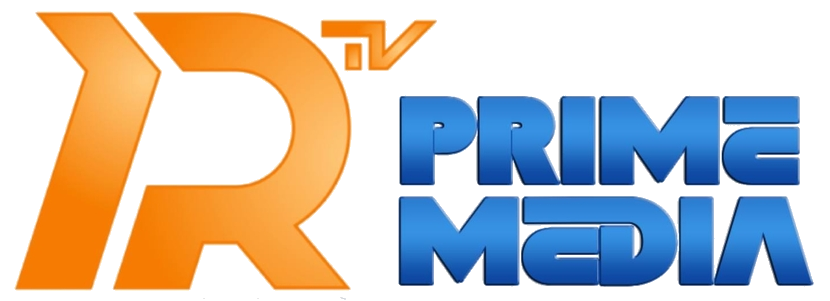
- Type: Free-to-air digital television network
- Country: Philippines
- Broadcast area: Nationwide
- Affiliates: ABS-CBN News; BEAM TV

Programming
- Language: Filipino
- Picture format: 1080i/720p HDTV (downscaled to 16:9 480i for the SDTV feed)

Ownership
- Owner: Prime Media Holdings
- Parent: Philippine Collective Media Corporation
- Sister channels: DZMM TeleRadyo; PRTV (Tacloban); DZMM Radyo Patrol 630; Favorite Music Radio

History
- Launched: May 27, 2024; 2 years ago (test broadcast); July 15, 2024; 2 years ago (official launch)
- Replaced: PIE Channel (BEAM TV channel space); Shop TV (Cignal TV channel space)

Availability

Terrestrial
- BEAM TV (Nationwide): Channel x.1 (DTT)
- Cignal TV (Nationwide): Channel 31

Streaming media
- YouTube: Watch Live

PRTV Prime Media, also known as PRTV Manila, is a Philippine free-to-air digital television network owned by Prime Media Holdings thru Philippine Collective Media Corporation. It serves as the national extension of PCMC's PRTV brand, which is currently used on its regional television station in Tacloban.

== History ==
Prior to the launch, PCMC has been planning to launch of a national TV channel after its Congressional franchise was amended in 2020 to expand its coverage into nationwide broadcast. PCMC became an indirect subsidiary of Prime Media Holdings (PRIM) after the two firms signed a sharing deal through backdoor listing.

PCMC/Prime Media has been collaborating with ABS-CBN Corporation through a joint-venture to operate Radyo 630 and TeleRadyo Serbisyo (now DZMM Radyo Patrol 630 and DZMM TeleRadyo). Aside from ABS-CBN, Prime Media has also been discussing collaborations with other content providers, including TV5's and Cignal TV's owner, MediaQuest Holdings.

On May 27, 2024, PCMC/Prime Media launched Prime TV and began its test broadcast on BEAM TV's digital subchannel broadcast featuring TeleRadyo Serbisyo programming and a simulcast of ABS-CBN News' TV Patrol.

On October 28, 2024, Prime TV was rebranded as PRTV Prime Media.

== Programming ==
=== Current ===
- DZMM TeleRadyo sa PRTV Prime Media (2025–present; See List of programs broadcast by DZMM/DZMM TeleRadyo)
- Jess Asking with Jess Falcis (2026–present; simulcast with FMR network)
- Kwatro Alas (2025–present; simulcast with FMR network)
- Pilipinas News Update (2026–present)
- TV Patrol sa PRTV Prime Media (2024–present; simulcast with A2Z, All TV, ANC, Kapamilya Channel, TeleRadyo Serbisyo/DZMM TeleRadyo, DWPM Radyo 630/DZMM Radyo Patrol 630 and FMR network)
- TV Patrol Weekend sa PRTV Prime Media (2024–present; simulcast with A2Z, All TV, ANC, Kapamilya Channel, TeleRadyo Serbisyo/DZMM TeleRadyo, DWPM Radyo 630/DZMM Radyo Patrol 630 and FMR network)
- With Due Respect (2025–present; simulcast with FMR network)

=== Former ===
- Arangkada Balita (2025–2026; on temporary hiatus)
- PRTV News Break (2025–2026)
- TeleRadyo Serbisyo sa PRTV Prime Media (2024–2025; See List of programs aired by DZMM/DZMM TeleRadyo)

== Availability ==
PRTV Prime Media is seen via BEAM TV's digital terrestrial UHF channel 31 in Mega Manila, Cebu, Zamboanga and Davao, UHF channel 26 in Baguio and Iloilo, UHF channel 36 in Batangas, UHF channel 32 in Naga, UHF channel 33 in Legazpi, UHF channel 28 in Tacloban, UHF channel 43 in Cagayan de Oro and UHF channel 51 in General Santos; it can also seen via Sky Cable Channel 21 in Metro Manila. As of April 1, 2025, PRTV Prime Media is now available on Cignal channel 31 nationwide (DTH only), following the start of its test broadcast earlier that month. The test broadcast phase on Cignal ended on May 20, 2025, and it is now available to both DTH and IPTV subscribers. Select programs can also be streamed worldwide through its official YouTube channel.

== See also ==
- DZMM TeleRadyo
- DZMM Radyo Patrol 630
- ABS-CBN Corporation
- Philippine Collective Media Corporation
