= DWPM =

Radio station in Metro Manila, Philippines

Radyo Patrol (DWPM)
- Logo used since May 29, 2025
- Quezon City; Philippines
- Broadcast area: Mega Manila and surrounding areas
- Frequency: 630 kHz
- Branding: DZMM Radyo Patrol 630

Programming
- Language: Filipino
- Format: News, Public Affairs, Talk, Drama
- Affiliations: ABS-CBN News; DZMM TeleRadyo; Favorite Music Radio; PRTV Prime Media

Ownership
- Owner: Philippine Collective Media Corporation
- Operator: Media Serbisyo Production Corporation
- Sister stations: 92.3 FMR; PRTV Prime Media

History
- First air date: June 30, 2023
- Former names: Radyo 630 (2023–2025)
- Call sign meaning: Prime Media Holdings

Technical information
- Licensing authority: NTC
- Class: A (clear frequency)
- Power: 50,000 watts

Links
- Webcast: Listen live (Local and International feed); Listen live (via MyTuner)
- Website: pcmc.com.ph/dzmmradyopatrol630

Media Serbisyo Production Corporation
- Type: Private joint venture
- Industry: Broadcasting, digital media
- Founded: May 23, 2023
- Headquarters: Unit 5A Hollywood Square Building 33 West Avenue Penthouse Nayong Kanluran, Quezon City, Metro Manila, Philippines
- Key people: Dennis P. Manalo (Chairman); Marah Capuyan (President)
- Owner: Philippine Collective Media Corporation (51%); ABS-CBN Corporation (49%)

DWPM (630 AM), on-air as DZMM Radyo Patrol 630, is a radio station owned by Philippine Collective Media Corporation and operated conjointly with ABS-CBN Corporation under Media Serbisyo Production Corporation. The station's studio is located at the ABS-CBN Broadcasting Center, Sgt. Esguerra Ave., cor. Mother Ignacia St., Barangay South Triangle, Diliman, Quezon City; its transmitter is located along F. Navarette St., Brgy. Panghulo, Obando, Bulacan.

DWPM was established in June 2023 after PCMC was awarded a license for a new station on the frequency; ABS-CBN had held the frequency as DZMM from 1953 to 2020, when it was stripped of its broadcasting licenses by the Filipino government. The station initially launched as Radyo 630, with PCMC and parent company Prime Media Holdings entering into an agreement with ABS-CBN (which had continued DZMM's news/talk programming on other platforms as TeleRadyo) to co-produce programming for the new station. In May 2025, DWPM revived the DZMM Radyo Patrol branding, and began to integrate some of its previous programs into its lineup.

Some of the station's programs are simulcast on television by DZMM TeleRadyo, which is distributed on terrestrial television via PRTV Prime Media, and on selected Favorite Music Radio (FMR) stations.

== History ==
=== 2023–25: Radyo 630 ===
First logo

On May 23, 2023, ABS-CBN Corporation announced that it would launch a joint venture with Prime Media Holdings, owned by then House Speaker Representative Martin Romualdez, to produce and supply programs—including news content—to broadcasters and third-party entities, including the PMHI-owned Philippine Collective Media Corporation, operator of the Favorite Music Radio FM radio network. Among the plans was the possible revival of ABS-CBN's former talk radio station DZMM, after PCMC was awarded a license for a new station on its former frequency of 630 kHz.

On June 26, 2023, 630 kHz conducted a test broadcast under the DWPM callsign. The station soft launched on June 30, 2023, as Radyo 630, broadcasting only in the morning hours. Concurrent with the launch, TeleRadyo—a cable channel that previously served as a television simulcast of DZMM before ABS-CBN was stripped of its broadcasting licenses in 2020—was taken over by the Prime/ABS-CBN joint venture Media Serbisyo Production Corporation—and relaunched as TeleRadyo Serbisyo. The station officially launched on July 17, 2023, adding afternoon and evening programming featuring a mix of ABS-CBN and TeleRadyo personalities as hosts.

The station soft launched on June 30, 2023, as Radyo 630. A day prior to the launch, hosts of several programs from ABS-CBN's Filipino cable news channel TeleRadyo (formerly DZMM TeleRadyo) has informed their viewers to tune-in to the new station the next day. Its soft launch coincided with the relaunch of TeleRadyo as TeleRadyo Serbisyo, which is also now handled under the Prime Media/ABS-CBN joint-venture management. It had its official launch on July 17, with the debut of its afternoon and evening programs. In March 2024, the station added early-morning programmes, and expanded back to a 24-hour schedule on July 1, 2024.

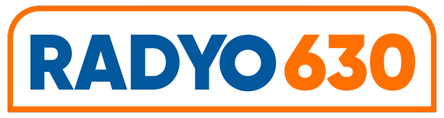
Second logo

In May 2025, it was reported that Media Serbisyo Production Corporation was seeking new funding, after suffering PHP25.9 million in losses over the previous year.

=== 2025–present: The return of DZMM ===
On May 29, 2025, DWPM relaunched as DZMM Radyo Patrol 630, reviving the branding and format of its predecessor. The relaunch came ahead of a programming overhaul on June 2, which included the reinstatement of former DZMM programs such as Radyo Patrol Balita, Aksyon Ngayon, and its radio drama anthology Maalaala Mo Kaya sa DZMM.

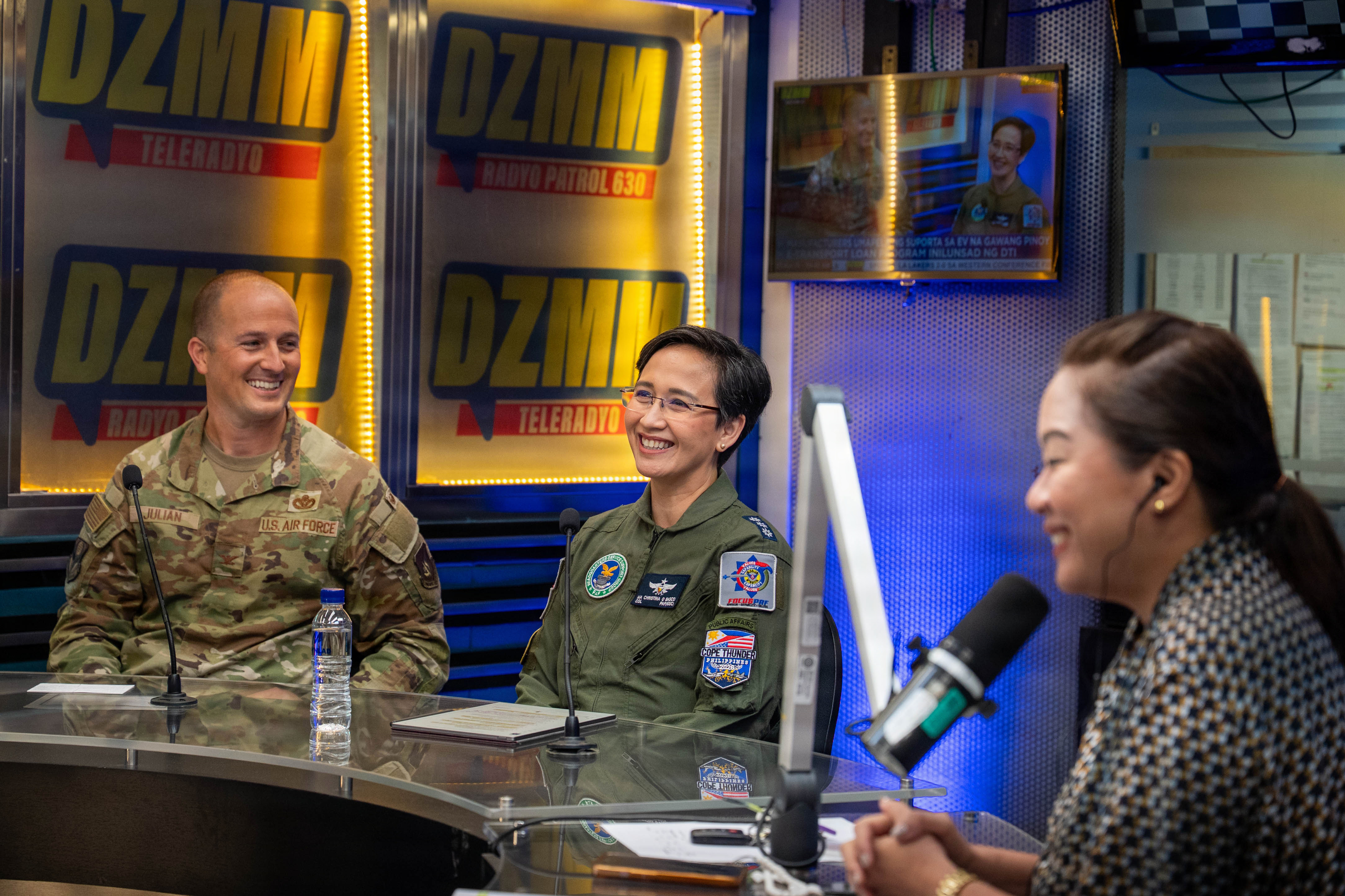
Rica Lazo (right) interviewing US Air Force Col. Paul Julian (left) and Philippine Air Force Col. Christina Basco (center) regarding Balikatan 2026 on the program Balitapatan on April 23, 2026.

The return of MMK, alongside the Friday afternoon segment of Ako 'To Si Tyang Amy called Tyang Amy Presents, marked the return of radio dramas to 630 for the first time since 2020.

Beginning in September, DZMM slowly revived the dual production setup for both itself and DZMM TeleRadyo, with ABS-CBN's support per its obligations with MSPC. By the time of the relaunch, the regular DZMM audio service was carrying Arangkada Balita, a PCMC/PRTV Prime Media co-production with the station and ABS-CBN News, which airs at 5:30 p.m. weekdays as a radio counterpart to TV Patrol Express - this being the same timeslot as Isyu Spotted, by then an exclusive broadcast only on DZMM TeleRadyo, the former later being livestreamed on PRTV Prime Media's official YouTube. Today, select TeleRadyo-only productions aired from its radio booth in Quezon City are aired as DZMM TeleRadyo exclusives, as was the case before 2020, as well as DZMM-only productions, with some also simulcast on PRTV Prime Media and its YouTube page.

== Notable on-air personalities ==
=== Current ===
- Alvin Elchico
- Amy Perez
- Charo Santos-Concio
- Doris Bigornia
- Ganiel Krishnan
- Gus Abelgas
- Migs Bustos
- Niña Corpuz
- Noli de Castro
- Peter Musñgi
- Winnie Cordero

=== Former ===
- Erwin Tulfo
- Henry Omaga-Diaz
- Jeff Canoy
- Karla Estrada
- Karmina Constantino
- Ted Herbosa
- Tina Marasigan
- Richard Heydarian
- Ronald Llamas

== See also ==
- ABS-CBN Corporation
- Philippine Collective Media Corporation
- DZMM TeleRadyo
- DZMM
