= ABS-CBN News and Current Affairs =

News and current affairs division of ABS-CBN Corporation

- Primary logo

- Secondary logo
- Division of: ABS-CBN Corporation
- Country: Philippines
- Area served: Worldwide
- Key people: Mary Anne Francis B. Toral-Torres (SVP/Head, Integrated News and Current Affairs); Claude Vitug (Head, News Administration); Chi Almario-Gonzales (Head, News Gathering); Dondie Garcia (Head, News Production); Alvaro Dan Morga (COO, ABS-CBN News Channel); Marah Faner-Capuyan (President, Media Serbisyo Production Corporation); Jeff Canoy (Chief of Reporters)
- Headquarters: ABS-CBN Broadcasting Center, Sgt. Esguerra Avenue corner Mother Ignacia Street, Diliman, Quezon City, Philippines
- Slogan: In The Service of the Filipino Worldwide; Andito Kami Para Sa ’Yo (English: We Are Here For You); Anumang Hamon, Anumang Panahon, Patuloy Kaming Maglilingkod Sa Inyo (English: Any Challenge, Any Time, We Will Continue to Serve You); Para Sa Mas Pinalaking Misyon. Para Sa Mas Pinalakas, Mas Pinalawak At Mas Pinalinaw Na Pagpapatrol Ng Pilipino (English: For a Bigger Mission. For a Stronger, Wider and Clearer Patrol of the Filipinos)
- Language: Filipino (main); English (secondary, used for ANC)
- Website: abs-cbn.com

ABS-CBN News and Current Affairs, known on-air as ABS-CBN News (formerly known as ABS-CBN News and Public Affairs), is the news and current affairs division of the Philippine media conglomerate ABS-CBN Corporation. The division is the country's largest international news gathering and broadcast organization, maintaining several foreign news bureaus and offices through ABS-CBN's Global division.

The division generates news output for the company's media assets such as radio station DZMM Radyo Patrol 630; the former main ABS-CBN terrestrial television network (including its former free-to-air television and radio stations) and its replacements Kapamilya Channel, A2Z, All TV and PRTV Prime Media; cable television through ANC and DZMM TeleRadyo; international channel TFC; and news websites news.abs-cbn.com and patrol.ph, which the former ranks as the top news website in the country as of November 2021.

== History ==
Logo used from 2000 to 2014.

=== News division ===
The oldest of the two components, the news division began as the news section of two radio stations - DZBC (opened 1949) and DZAQ (opened 1950) both in the Manila area, and DZRI (opened 1951) in Pangasinan, all under the Bolinao Electronics Corporation and later under the Alto Broadcasting System, which broadcast news programs and commentary as part of their programming schedules. In 1956, the Chronicle Broadcasting Network, together with the first news broadcasts on DZXL, started the short-lived 24-hour station DZQL Radyo Reloj broadcasting news and current affairs until late 1959, the first station of its kind in the country. When the two networks merged in 1957, first as part of Bolinao Electronics Corporation and later on in 1961 adopting the ABS-CBN brand (which it started to adapt the ABS-CBN Broadcasting Corporation as corporate name on February 1, 1967, and later ABS-CBN Corporation on October 1, 2008, with the former now serves as the conglomerate's secondary and alternative name since the said date of October 2008), the news services of these four Manila stations, later reduced to three, were combined into a unified news service but then with separate programs, as the network began expanding with the purchase and later opening of additional stations, first in the Ilocos region and the Cordillera, and then into the Visayas islands, Mindanao, and southern parts of Luzon, with the national radio service broadcasting from the Chronicle Building along Aduana street, Intramuros, Manila, which began broadcasting the two Manila stations in 1958. Alongside them was a small television news service on DZAQ-TV 3 and DZXL-TV 9 with updates broadcast daily, owing to the lack of proper news programs from the beginning of broadcasts in late 1953, with both stations' news bureaus based in the television studios in Roxas Boulevard, Pasay (opened in 1958).

Proper news programming on TV, however, would begin in 1960 when news coverage for the national elections began. Channel 9's Coverage would be the first weekly news program produced by ABS-CBN and it would be followed by the first Filipino-language TV newscast, Balita Ngayon, in 1966 on Channel 3 and in November 21 with the English-language newscast The World Tonight on late nights, which is today the longest running English-language national newscast. Channel 9 followed suit with the long-running Newsbreak as well, joined later by Apat na Sulok ng Daigdig. By 1968, following the aftermath of the magnitude 7.6 earthquake in Casiguran (in which Manila was severely affected by the quake), leading to the collapse of the Ruby Tower in August that same year, the joint radio and color television coverage of which was the first time ever for a Philippine media company to do so, DZAQ was later converted into a 24-hour Filipino language news and current affairs radio station, adopting the DZAQ Radyo Patrol 960 branding under the initiative of former station manager Orly Mercado, veteran broadcaster Joe Taruc, Ben Aniceto, the then ABS-CBN program director and Chief Engr. Emil Solidum, whose efforts led to the recruitment of the first generation of mobile field reporters for news coverage and flash reports, a first for any radio station at that time. The station would prove to be a leading source of breaking news stories in the late 1960s and before Martial Law stopped broadcasts in September 1972, Radyo Patrol services were operational in select regional stations, alongside an active service of regional programming in all provincial TV stations in addition to occasional nationwide broadcasts via satellite, the first for any station by then. In 1969 the network would also make history with the first ever weekend news broadcast, This Week's News, a Channel 2 presentation.

In July 1986, the news services of ABS-CBN were officially reactivated as part of the network's return to former owners, when DZMM was officially relaunched that month from the Benpres Building in the Ortigas Center District of Pasig. The new station broadcast its newscasts twice daily, Mondays to Saturdays, with a Sunday midday news program. Two months later, both Balita Ngayon and The World Tonight made their television returns on the now reopened TV network. In February 1987, Balita Ngayon aired its final broadcasts to give way to the now current flagship Filipino language broadcast, TV Patrol, which began on March 2, 1987.

The network restarted regional TV news services in 1988, the same year it launched nationwide satellite broadcasts of TV Patrol to reach viewers all over the nation.

=== Current affairs division ===
The division traces its roots to the current affairs and commentary programming that both DZAQ and later on DZXL and DZQL aired beginning in the mid-1950s in both Filipino and English, keeping listeners informed of the latest issues that affect Filipinos. In the 1960s, these would also be complemented by television programming featuring such voices like Max Soliven and Francisco Rodrigo that were aired on the two TV channels.

== Divisions ==
The division operates and is headquartered at ABS-CBN Broadcast Complex in Quezon City while the ABS-CBN regional stations also have their local news divisions, which take part in news gathering for the whole network. It also has news bureaus in North America, Europe, Asia-Pacific, and the Middle East with the help of The Filipino Channel (owned by ABS-CBN Global, Ltd.), these make ABS-CBN News and Current Affairs one of the largest and the most comprehensive when it comes to local and international news gathering.

The division is currently headed by ABS-CBN's Senior Vice President for Integrated News and Current Affairs Mary Anne Francis B. Toral-Torres (who replaced Ma. Regina "Ging" Reyes, who retired on December 24, 2022). It is further subdivided into different subgroups:

- Integrated News Administration Group, headed by Claude Vitug.
- News Gathering Group, headed by Chi Almario-Gonzales.
- News Production Group, headed by Dondie Garcia.
- ABS-CBN News Channel, headed by Alvaro Dan Morga.
- Regional News Bureaus, headed by Stanley Palisada.
- Global News Bureaus, headed by Alcuin Papa.
- ABS-CBN News Digital
- ABS-CBN Weather Center is the weather forecasting division of ABS-CBN News and Current Affairs.
- DZMM Radyo Patrol 630 (formerly DWPM Radyo 630) is a Filipino-language news and talk AM radio station operated by Media Serbisyo Production Corporation, a joint venture between ABS-CBN and Prime Media Holdings headed by the President, Marah Faner-Capuyan.
  - DZMM TeleRadyo (formerly TeleRadyo Serbisyo, or simply known as TeleRadyo) the television counterpart of DZMM Radyo Patrol 630.
- DocuCentral is the producer of highly acclaimed documentaries shown on ABS-CBN's platforms.

Aside from regular programming, it also operates the ABS-CBN News Channel (ANC), the first and the only 24-hour English language news channel in the country. The division also operates a news website News.ABS-CBN.com in partnership with BusinessMirror.

== Programs ==
=== Currently aired ===
==== DZMM Radyo Patrol 630/DZMM TeleRadyo ====
- Ako 'To Si Tyang Amy
- Aksyon Ngayon
- Alam Na This!
- Anong Ganap?
- Anong Take Mo
- Aprub Yan!
- Balita Antemano
- Balita Ngayon
- Balitapatan
- Bongga Ka Jhai
- DZMM Balita Ngayon
- Feel Kita
- GBU (God Bless U)
- Gising Pilipinas
- Headline Ngayon
- Headline sa Hapon
- Hello Attorney
- Isyu Spotted
- Iwas Sakit, Iwas Gastos
- Kabayan
- Konek Ka Dyan
- K-Paps Playlist
- Kwatro Alas
- Ligtas Dapat
- Love Konek
- Maalaala Mo Kaya sa DZMM
- Mutya ng Masa
- Nagseserbisyo, Niña Corpuz at Migs Bustos
- Pasada Balita
- Panalong Diskarte
- Pasado Serbisyo
- Private Talks
- Radyo Patrol Balita Alas-Kwatro
- Radyo Patrol Balita Alas-Siyete
- Radyo Patrol Balita Alas-Siyete Weekend
- Radyo Patrol Flash Report
- Remember Your Music
- S.O.C.O. sa DZMM
- Safe Space
- Spot Report
- Story Outlook
- Travel ni Ahwel
- TV Patrol
- TV Patrol Weekend
- Wais Konsyumer
- Win Today
- Yan Tayo

==== Kapamilya Channel/All TV ====
- Ibang Level 'To!
- Mabilis Lang 'To (All TV only)
- My Puhunan: Kaya Mo!
- News Patrol
- Rated Korina
- S.O.C.O.: Scene of the Crime Operatives
- Philippines' Oddest Jobs
- Philippines' The Haunted
- TV Patrol
- TV Patrol Express
- TV Patrol Weekend
- The World Tonight

==== A2Z ====
- Ibang Level 'To
- My Puhunan: Kaya Mo!
- News Patrol
- Rated Korina
- S.O.C.O.: Scene of the Crime Operatives
- Philippines' Oddest Jobs
- Philippines' The Haunted
- TV Patrol
- TV Patrol Express
- TV Patrol Weekend

==== PRTV Prime Media ====
- Ako 'To Si Tyang Amy
- Aksyon Ngayon
- Anong Ganap?
- Anong Take Mo
- Alam Na This!
- Aprub Yan!
- Balita Antemano
- Balitapatan
- Bongga Ka Jhai
- DZMM Balita Ngayon
- Feel Kita
- GBU (God Bless U)
- Gising Pilipinas
- Headline Ngayon
- Headline sa Hapon
- Hello Attorney
- Iwas Sakit, Iwas Gastos
- Kabayan
- Konek Ka Dyan
- Kwatro Alas
- K-Paps Playlist
- Ligtas Dapat
- Maalaala Mo Kaya sa DZMM
- Nagseserbisyo, Niña Corpuz at Migs Bustos
- Panalong Diskarte
- Pasado Serbisyo
- Radyo Patrol Balita Alas-Siyete
- Radyo Patrol Flash Report
- S.O.C.O. sa DZMM
- Safe Space
- Spot Report
- Story Outlook
- Travel ni Ahwel
- TV Patrol
- TV Patrol Weekend
- Wais Konsyumer
- Win Today

==== ABS-CBN News Channel (ANC) ====
- ANC Breaking News
- ANC Headlines
- ANC Live
- ANC Presents
- Asian Air Safari
- At the Moment
- At the Table
- A List
- Banker After Dark
- Beyond the Exchange with Rico Hizon
- Business Outlook
- Chasing Flavors with Claude Tayag
- Dayaw
- Dateline Philippines
- Executive Class
- Feast TV
- Galing Pook
- Graceful Living
- Headstart with Karen Davila
- Market Edge
- Modern Living TV
- My Puhunan: Kaya Mo!
- On Cue
- Philippine Reality TV
- Rev+
- Show Me The Market
- State of the Art
- The Art Show
- The Game Changer Philippines
- The Wine Show
- The Word Exposed
- The World Tonight
- Top Story
- TV Patrol
- TV Patrol Express
- TV Patrol Regional
- TV Patrol Weekend

==== The Filipino Channel (TFC) ====
- Citizen Pinoy
- TFC News

=== Defunct programs ===
==== Regional programs ====
Newscasts

- TV Patrol Bicol (ABS-CBN TV-11 Naga)
- TV Patrol Central Visayas (ABS-CBN TV-3 Cebu)
- TV Patrol Chavacano (ABS-CBN TV-3 Zamboanga)
- TV Patrol Eastern Visayas (ABS-CBN TV-2 Tacloban)
- TV Patrol Negros (ABS-CBN TV-4 Bacolod)
- TV Patrol North Luzon (ABS-CBN TV-2 Isabela, ABS-CBN TV-7 Laoag, ABS-CBN TV-3 Baguio, ABS-CBN TV-32 Dagupan and ABS-CBN TV-46 Pampanga)
- TV Patrol North Mindanao (ABS-CBN TV-4 Cagayan de Oro and ABS-CBN TV-11 Butuan)
- TV Patrol Palawan (ABS-CBN TV-7 Palawan)
- TV Patrol Panay (ABS-CBN TV-10 Iloilo)
- TV Patrol South Central Mindanao (ABS-CBN TV-3 General Santos and ABS-CBN TV-5 Cotabato)
- TV Patrol Southern Mindanao (ABS-CBN TV-4 Davao)
- TV Patrol Southern Tagalog (ABS-CBN TV-10 Batangas)

Regional news bulletins

- News Patrol Bicol (ABS-CBN TV-11 Naga)
- News Patrol Central Visayas (ABS-CBN TV-3 Cebu)
- News Patrol Chavacano (ABS-CBN TV-3 Zamboanga)
- News Patrol North Luzon (ABS-CBN TV-3 Baguio and TV-32 Dagupan)
- News Patrol North Mindanao (ABS-CBN TV-4 Cagayan de Oro and TV-11 Butuan)
- News Patrol Palawan (ABS-CBN TV-7 Palawan)
- News Patrol South Central Mindanao (ABS-CBN TV-3 General Santos and ABS-CBN TV-5 Cotabato)
- News Patrol Southern Mindanao (ABS-CBN TV-4 Davao)
- TV Patrol Panay News Advisory (ABS-CBN TV-10 Iloilo)

Other regional programs

- Bagong Morning Kapamilya (ABS-CBN TV-2 Isabela, ABS-CBN TV-7 Laoag, ABS-CBN TV-3 Baguio and ABS-CBN TV-32 Dagupan)
- Maayong Buntag Kapamilya (ABS-CBN TV-3 Cebu and ABS-CBN TV-2 Tacloban)
  - Maayong Buntag Kapamilya Sabado
  - Maupay nga Aga Kapamilya
- Maayong Buntag Mindanao (ABS-CBN TV-4 Davao and ABS-CBN TV-3 Zamboanga)
  - Maayong Buntag Mindanao Sabado
  - Buenos Días Zamboanga
- Magandang Umaga South Central Mindanao (ABS-CBN TV-3 General Santos)
- Marhay na Aga Kapamilya (ABS-CBN TV-11 Naga)
- Pamahaw Espesyal (ABS-CBN TV-4 Cagayan de Oro)
- Panay Sikat (ABS-CBN TV-10 Iloilo)
  - Panay Sikat Sabado
- The Morning Show (ABS-CBN TV-4 Bacolod)

TeleRadyo/TeleRadyo Serbisyo programs

- Ang Tinig Nyo
- Bida Konsyumer
- Diskarte
- Dos por Dos
- Dr. Love
- Dra. Bles @ Ur Serbis
- Garantisadong Balita
- Good Job
- Headline Ngayon Express
- Headline Ngayon Weekend
- Headline Pilipinas
- Headlines of the Day
- Johnson, Ikwento Mo
- Juander Titser
- Kapamilya Konek
- Kasalo
- Klinika 630
- Konsyumer Atbp.
- Kumu Star Ka!
- Kuwentuhang Lokal
- Lingkod Aksyon
- Lingkod Kapamilya sa TeleRadyo
- Magandang Morning
- Magpayo Nga Kayo
- Omaga-Diaz Reports
- On the Spot
- Pasada
- Pasada sa TeleRadyo
- Pintig ng Bayan
- Playback
- Radyo Negosyo
- Radyo 630 Balita
- Red Alert sa TeleRadyo
- Sagot Ko 'Yan!
- Sakto
- Serbisyong DSWD for Every Juan
- Showbiz Sidelines
- SKL: Share Ko Lang
- SRO: Suhestyon, Reaksyon, at Opinyon
- Tandem: Lima at Logan
- Tatak: Serbisyo
- TeleBalita
- TeleBalita Weekend
- TeleRadyo Balita
- TeleRadyo Balita Weekend
- TeleRadyo Serbisyo Balita
- TeleRadyo Serbisyo Rewind
- Todo-Todo Walang Preno
- Tulong Ko, Pasa Mo
- Winner sa Life
- Wow Sikat

== iPatrol Mo! ==
ABS-CBN News launched its own citizen journalism campaign during its coverage of the 2007 Philippine General Elections. Initially entitled Boto Mo, iPatrol Mo! (Tagalog for Your Vote, You Patrol), it reflects upon the station's flagship newscast, TV Patrol. The campaign is now called Bayan Mo, iPatrol Mo! (Your Town, You Patrol) and is often abbreviated as BMPM.

An extension of the campaign BMPM: Ako ang Simula (I Am the Beginning) was launched on May 11, 2009 - and was its banner for the network's coverage of the 2010 Presidential Elections. A re-launch of the campaign was carried out in June 2009 by the network as part of its commemoration of Philippine Independence Day.

For 2013, the campaign evolves to BMPM: Tayo Na! (Tagalog for Let's Go!) as its citizen journalism arm for the network's coverage of the 2013 Elections. This campaign was kicked off on June 12, 2012.

What once started out as an arm that is mainly dependent on using SMS and MMS technologies, BMPM has provided more venues for "Bayan Patrollers" - people who submit reports to BMPM - through its digital and social media presence. BMPM also comes as a feature in two mobile apps - ABS-CBNnews.com's and COMELEC's - which are present in iOS, Android, and Windows.

The network's two main competitors - GMA (GMA News) and TV5 (News5) - also have their own citizen journalism campaigns named YouScoop+ (formerly YouScoop and #BalitaKo) and Mobile Journo, respectively.

== See also ==
- ABS-CBN (inactive on free TV; active as a content provider)
- Kapamilya Channel
- ABS-CBN News Channel
- A2Z
- All TV
- DZMM TeleRadyo
- DZMM Radyo Patrol 630
- DWPM Radyo 630 (defunct)
- Studio 23 (defunct)
- S+A (defunct)
