= DZMM TeleRadyo =

Philippine pay television channel

- Logo of DZMM TeleRadyo since May 29, 2025
- Country: Philippines
- Broadcast area: Nationwide (via cable and satellite); Worldwide (via iWant and TFC)
- Network: DZMM Radyo Patrol 630
- Affiliates: ABS-CBN News

Programming
- Languages: Filipino (main); English (secondary)
- Picture format: 1080i/720p HDTV (downscaled to 16:9 480i for the SDTV feed)

Ownership
- Owner: Prime Media Holdings; Philippine Collective Media Corporation; ABS-CBN Corporation
- Parent: Media Serbisyo Production Corporation
- Sister channels: Through PCMC/Prime Media: PRTV (Tacloban); PRTV Prime Media; 92.3 FMR Manila; Through ABS-CBN: A2Z (via ZOE TV); ALLTV2 (via AMBS); ANC; Cinema One; Cine Mo!; Jeepney TV; Kapamilya Channel; Knowledge Channel; Metro Channel; Myx; TFC; MOR Entertainment (online radio)

History
- Launched: April 12, 2007; 19 years ago
- Replaced: PIE Channel (BEAM TV channel space)
- Replaced by: SMNI News Channel (UHF 43 channel space); Light TV (digital channel space on ZOE TV); TV Shop Philippines (Cignal Channel Space); Viva Cinema (SatLite Channel Space)
- Former names: TeleRadyo/ABS-CBN TeleRadyo (2020–23); TeleRadyo Serbisyo (2023–25)

Availability

Terrestrial
- Sky Cable Metro Manila: Channel 26
- SkyTV Metro Manila: Channel 47
- G Sat Nationwide: Channel 8
- Cablelink Metro Manila, Bulacan, Tarlac, Cavite, Laguna: Channel 7
- Sinag Cable Rizal: Channel 7
- Cignal TV Nationwide: Channel 32
- SatLite Nationwide: Channel 32

Streaming media
- iWant: Watch Live
- YouTube: Watch Live
- Facebook: Watch Live

DZMM TeleRadyo (formerly TeleRadyo Serbisyo and also known as TeleRadyo) is a Philippine pay television channel owned by Media Serbisyo Production Corporation, a joint venture between Prime Media Holdings (through its subsidiary Philippine Collective Media Corporation) and ABS-CBN Corporation. Its main content provider is ABS-CBN News, and it is available on cable and satellite providers throughout the Philippines. DZMM TeleRadyo is also simulcast via The Filipino Channel (TFC) and can be accessed online through its YouTube channel, Facebook Page and iWant.

Previously, TeleRadyo was included as a standalone digital subchannel on ABS-CBN TVplus and other digital TV boxes until its discontinuation on June 30, 2020. It resumed its digital free-to-air broadcast on May 27, 2022, as a subchannel through ZOE Broadcasting Network's transmitters until November 1, 2022. Since May 27, 2024, portions of the channel's programs are simulcast on PRTV Prime Media (PMHI's national version of its Tacloban counterpart), which airs terrestrially as a subchannel via DTT transmitters of BEAM TV.

Since its launch in 2007, the channel has simulcast programs from the AM radio station DZMM 630. When DZMM temporarily went off the air on May 5, 2020, due to a cease and desist order from the National Telecommunications Commission, along with its sister stations ABS-CBN, S+A, and MOR Philippines, it was rebranded as TeleRadyo (branded as ABS-CBN TeleRadyo on 2022), with most of DZMM's programming transferring to the channel.

On June 28, 2021, TeleRadyo began broadcasting in high-definition on YouTube and Facebook, while selected shows aired in HD on Kapamilya Channel and The Filipino Channel. The channel rebranded as TeleRadyo Serbisyo on June 30, 2023, coinciding with the launch of its radio counterpart Radyo 630, under the joint venture of Prime Media and ABS-CBN.

On May 29, 2025, the channel reverted to DZMM TeleRadyo, coinciding with the relaunch of its iconic callsign in its radio counterpart, replacing DWPM Radyo 630.

An international feed is available worldwide as part of TFC premium channels via cable, satellite, iWant, and TFC IPTV.

== History ==
=== Under ABS-CBN (2007–2023) ===
DZMM TeleRadyo logo before the shutdown.

Conceptualization of what would become DZMM TeleRadyo started in 2006 after Gabby Lopez and other ABS-CBN executives conducted a business trip to South Korea. As recounted by Lopez himself and Peter Musñgi in the 2016 DZMM documentary 30 / 630: Kwento ng Tatlong Dekada, they were initially apprehensive about an idea of visually streaming the radio station on TV in fear of driving radio listeners away. Still, key points made during the business trip secured enough reason for the group to relent and push the concept. In January 2007, Marah Capuyan, who later became DZMM's station manager, was tasked with planning, procuring, and installing the necessary lighting within a one-month deadline.

Test broadcasts began in February 2007 until the channel was formally launched on April 12.

==== Features ====
DZMM TeleRadyo featured a simulcast of DZMM's radio programs as well as a live video feed of the radio booth itself. As a result, viewers can hear the broadcast and watch footage from the cast online. When there is a live broadcast, live video footage is provided that has clearer audio is provided. Musical programs on the station were either supplemented with pictures of artists (during Yesterday) or random pictures instead of the studio scenes (which was the case during Moonlight Serenade; it was replaced by video clips of Philippine tourism spots during K-Paps Playlist since 2023, Remember Your Music and Relaxing Music on Private Talks since 2024).

Content during commercial breaks on cable TV and digital TV were separate from advertisements on the radio station. The channel, however, simulcasts the Three O' Clock prayer, the station ID, as well as the station's sign-on and sign-off sequence.

Regular radio feed will be interrupted to air programming that is dedicated to their listeners such as the UAAP men's basketball Finals coverage from 2013 to 2014 and the various legs of the PiliPinas Debates 2016. Regular scheduled programming will continue for TeleRadyo viewers until the coverage for radio ends.

From June 19, 2017, to March 18, 2020, DZMM set-up additional studio sets for its radio programs such as Sakto, Good Vibes, Todo-Todo Walang Preno and On The Spot as part of the station's plans to convert itself into a full-fledged news channel. From October 26, 2020, to June 29, 2023, Sakto was the last program to use their studio. On the latter date, many of the channel's programs used Sakto's old studio to coincide with the final broadcast of the ABS-CBN-owned TeleRadyo after 6 years of use.

On March 18, 2020, DZMM Radyo Patrol 630 and DZMM TeleRadyo began to share channel space with its sister English-language news network ABS-CBN News Channel as part of the larger ABS-CBN News coverage of the COVID-19 pandemic every Tuesday, Thursday and Sunday; with ANC's relay of DZMM programs on Mondays, Wednesdays, Fridays and Saturdays. This arrangement ended on April 20. ANC's partnership with DZMM TeleRadyo continues during the overnight graveyard slot.

On June 26, 2021, TeleRadyo updated its lower-third graphics as the channel migrated to high-definition television broadcast online. However, the feed still used a 4:3 aspect ratio, but is stretched in an anamorphic vision format.

==== COVID-19 pandemic and ABS-CBN shutdown ====
TeleRadyo interim logo from May 5, 2020, to May 15, 2022.

Due to a skeletal workforce imposed by the network at the height of the COVID-19 pandemic, DZMM TeleRadyo, Radyo Patrol 630 and ANC began to simulcast newscasts and programs from March 19, 2020. The simulcast for the radio counterpart broke-away with a hook-up of MOR 101.9 from 10:00 pm until 4:30 am, temporarily replacing Showbuzz, Dr. Love Radio Show, Moonlight Serenade and Gising Pilipinas. On April 1, given the decision to vacate the studios for the self-quarantine of many of the staff and the disinfection measures after being exposed to two suspected coronavirus cases, the channel provisionally broadcast ANC programming (with a 10:00 pm breakaway for radio as had been the case). Regular broadcasts resumed a day later on April 2.

On May 5, 2020, the channel dropped the DZMM callsign, and rebranded itself as TeleRadyo after the National Telecommunications Commission (NTC) issued a cease-and-desist order against its radio counterpart and other ABS-CBN free TV and radio stations nationwide. The last program to air on May 5 was S.R.O., which was supposed to air until 11:00 pm, (PST) but ended broadcasting at 8:20 pm instead. Most DZMM TeleRadyo programming resumed on May 8 at 5:00 am (PST) as TeleRadyo, where the old DZMM TeleRadyo logo appeared as a primary logo (and as a digital on-screen graphic and bumper logo) beginning at around 12:00 pm (PST), with the TeleRadyo logo being secondarily shown. This last until May 9, at around 5:15 pm (PST), when the TeleRadyo logo was shown primarily.

On May 10, 2020, TeleRadyo's refurbished logo and bumper began to be used full-time.

On May 15, 2020, ANC stopped its simulcast with TeleRadyo and was replaced by the overnight replay of programs aired earlier in the day. The channel's simulcast resumed on August 23, 2021, until June 29, 2023.

On May 27, 2020, the channel's primary bumper was updated.

==== Return to digital television via ZOE TV ====
On May 27, 2022, TeleRadyo returned on digital free TV via ZOE TV's digital channel space, coinciding with the second anniversary of the rebrand. Its broadcast hours were from 5:30 am to 10:00 pm on weekdays and 6:00 am to 10:00 pm on weekends (PST) due to their subchannel rental agreement with ZOE Broadcasting Network with its official launch on June 1, 2022. TeleRadyo's 24-hour broadcast remained on cable, satellite, iWantTFC (now iWant), TFC, and TFC IPTV (while airing their 2006 version of the Philippine National Anthem every Monday mornings at 5:30 am (PST)).

After 5 months, TeleRadyo was pulled from digital free TV for the second time on November 1, 2022, after ABS-CBN and ZOE decided not to renew their licensing contract for the channel as one of A2Z's digital subchannels. It was subsequently replaced by the mirror feed of Light TV.

==== Proposed closure; relaunch under new management ====
TeleRadyo interim logo (with ABS-CBN 2014 horizontal logo added) from May 16, 2022, to June 29, 2023.

On May 23, 2023, ABS-CBN Corporation announced that TeleRadyo would cease its operations effective June 30, 2023, to cut further financial losses caused by the loss of the company's broadcast franchise. 70 employees of TeleRadyo would be laid off ABS-CBN by June 29, a day before the final broadcast of TeleRadyo's live programs.

In addition, ABS-CBN entered into a joint venture agreement with Prime Media Holdings, Inc., owned by House Speaker and Leyte first district Representative Martin Romualdez to produce and supply various programs including news content to broadcasters and third-party entities including the PMHI-owned Philippine Collective Media Corporation, operator of the Favorite Music Radio network. ABS-CBN would hold a minority stake in the new venture. Among the plans for ABS-CBN and Prime Media's joint venture is the possible revival of DZMM on its original frequency of 630 kHz.

=== Under Prime Media and ABS-CBN (since 2023) ===
TeleRadyo Serbisyo logo (June 30, 2023 to May 29, 2025)

However, a few days before the supposed closure of the channel, ABS-CBN decided not to push through with the planned date and instead, decided to continue to broadcast under the new management led by the Prime Media/ABS-CBN joint venture Media Serbisyo Production Corporation, coinciding with the resumption of broadcasts on 630 kHz as Radyo 630. ABS-CBN-owned TeleRadyo signed off for the last time on June 29, 2023, at 10:15 pm, and was relaunched as TeleRadyo Serbisyo the following day, in conjunction with the launch of DWPM Radyo 630 (both under joint-venture of Prime Media and ABS-CBN). A day before the launch, hosts of several TeleRadyo programs informed their viewers to tune in to the new station the next day.

On May 21, 2025, DWPM Radyo 630 and TeleRadyo Serbisyo began airing teasers that featured theme music and stingers used by DZMM, indicating the station's future rebranding to adopt the ethos of its predecessor. The teaser was released amidst the station's reutilization of the defunct DZMM TeleRadyo Facebook page since February, fuelling reports of Media Serbisyo Production Corporation's incurring losses due to a lack of advertisers, and plans of its owners, ABS-CBN and PCMC, to boost funding for the station.

On May 29, 2025, the channel dropped the TeleRadyo Serbisyo branding after finishing the TV Patrol simulcast, and reverted to DZMM TeleRadyo simultaneously with its radio counterpart at 8:00PM, reviving the iconic brand after 5 years of inactivity. Its simulcast block on PRTV Prime Media was not affected by the rebranding.

As disclosed to the Philippine Stock Exchange by Prime Media, this joint venture is at a net loss of around 50.9 million pesos for 2024.

==== Simulcast on digital free TV via PRTV Prime Media ====
On May 27, 2024, several TeleRadyo Serbisyo (now DZMM TeleRadyo) programs commenced airing on digital free TV via PRTV Prime Media, a subchannel on BEAM TV operated by the PCMC, which is also aired nationally on Cignal TV, resuming direct satellite broadcasts of the channel since the end of TeleRadyo broadcasts on the Sky Direct service in 2020, coupled with an earlier successful introduction of satellite broadcasts on G Sat in February.

== See also ==
- A2Z
- ABS-CBN (inactive channel)
- ALLTV2
- Kapamilya Channel
- DZMM Radyo Patrol 630 (ABS-CBN's AM radio station under joint venture with Prime Media Holdings)
- ABS-CBN News and Current Affairs (ABS-CBN's news division)
- ABS-CBN News Channel (a 24-hour English-language cable news channel)
- PRTV Prime Media
