= 2008 Maimbung kidnappings =

2008 terrorist incident in the Philippines

- Part of Moro conflict
- Location: Maimbung, Sulu, Philippines
- Date: June 3–12, 2008 (9 days)
- Target: Ces Drilon; Jimmy Encarnacion; Angelo Valderrama; Octavio Dinampo
- Attack type: Kidnapping
- Perpetrator: Abu Sayyaf

The 2008 Maimbung kidnappings were a terrorist incident in the Philippines in June 2008, where ABS-CBN journalist Ces Drilon and news cameramen Jimmy Encarnacion and Angelo Valderrama were abducted in Sulu by al-Qaeda-linked Abu Sayyaf militants.

== Kidnapping ==
Drilon's team was invited by Professor Octavio Dinampo, an academic at the Mindanao State University–Sulu, to visit. On 3 June 2008, Dinampo picked Drilon and associates up from their hostel, and their car was ambushed by militants while they were driving to the university. Drilon, Dinampo, news cameramen Jimmy Encarnacion and Angelo Valderrama were all abducted by al-Qaeda-linked Abu Sayyaf militants. The militants were led by Albader Parad, an Abu Sayyaf leader and Gapur Jundain, former member of the Moro National Liberation Front.

Chief Superintendent Joel Goltiao, police regional director for the Autonomous Region in Muslim Mindanao (ARMM), announced that: "They are being fed well, they are well and alive, they are not tied up and they are able to move around, but they are being escorted." Ransom was allegedly demanded, ranging from ₱10 million to ₱30 million (US$410,000 and US$630,000). Drilon was the third local journalist to be kidnapped by Abu Sayyaf after 2000.

=== Release and deadline ===
The militants released Valderama on June 12, after a ransom payment of ₱100,000 pesos (US$2,250). Negotiator Isnaji Alvarez stated that the abductors gave Drilon's family until June 17 to pay US$1.12 million, but a deadline for the other two hostages was unclear. Xinhua, reported that the "militants have set a deadline of Tuesday noon for a ransom of ₱15 million pesos (US$337,079)". Isnaji earlier said "the abductors demanded 20 million pesos (US$450,000) in ransom". Minutes before the deadline, the kidnappers "indefinitely" extended the deadline for the release of Drilon and her companions.

Drilon and her companions were released on June 17, 2008, following negotiations with Philippine security officials. Oreña-Drilon, Jimmy Encarnacion, and Octavio Dinampo were picked up in Talipao, Indanan, Sulu, by Mayor Alvarez Isnaji at midnight.

Drilon and her crew met Grechie and Frank Oreña, Drilon's siblings, with Loren Legarda and Maria Ressa on June 18, in Zamboanga City, at the La Vista del Mar Beach Resort. They arrived at Ninoy Aquino International Airport from Zamboanga International Airport around 2:00 PM for a short press conference, and underwent a medical checkup at Medical City Hospital in Pasig City, Metro Manila.

Senator Loren Legarda, a negotiator, said the refusal of ABS-CBN and the government to pay a ransom, and the deployment of troops around Indanan, prompted the release. Al Jazeera's reporter, Veronica Pedrosa, stated "a military offensive near the kidnappers' camp had apparently helped free the hostages". Drilon stated that she was betrayed by someone who delivered her to the kidnappers and the Abu Sayyaf militants threatened to behead them: "There was some betrayal involved and that is why we were kidnapped; I thought I was so reckless" AFP reported that a ransom was paid "following talks between the Abu Sayyaf and Senator Loren Legarda." The Canadian Press stated that "There were speculations that as much as $337,000 in ransom was paid for their release. Drilon condemned the abductors, who tied them and slapped her during the dire detention." AHN, however, reported that the release was made in exchange for livelihood assistance instead of a ransom. Philippine National Police Chief Avelino Razon stated: "She told me, General I'm sorry you were dragged into this. I told her, it's not a problem, it's our job to ensure your safe return".

== Arrest and investigation ==
Octavio Dinampo, on June 20, stated that Mayor Alvarez Isnaji "pocketed" much of the first ransom of ₱5 million (US$112,500). Isnaji's lawyer, Ernesto Francisco, however, said his client was innocent and was being prosecuted for political reasons: "If you examine the background of Mayor Isnaji, there is no instance in the past that he was involved in any criminal activity." Raul M. Gonzalez said "Isnaji was a highly respected politician in Jolo who plans to run for governor of the Muslim autonomous region, which includes the island, in August." Gonzalez and PNP Director General Avelino Razon Jr. affirmed that Isnaji "kept to himself ₱3 million (US$67,568) and paid the kidnappers ₱2 million (US$45,045) (from the Drilon family)". Razon Jr. showed pictures of Isnaji, his son, Haider, and Sulu Vice-Governor Lady Ann Sahidulla gathered around the ₱5 million ransom, with Senior Superintendent Willy Quidato. Meanwhile, Dinampo and Sulu provincial police director Senior Superintendent Julasirim Kasim said that guide Juamil "Mameng" Biyaw betrayed the ABS-CBN team.

The Criminal Investigation and Detection Group (CIDG) filed the complaint to the Department of Justice on June 20, against Isnaji, his son Haider, and 14 Abu Sayyaf members, for the kidnapping. Ces Drilon, Jimmy Encarnacion, and Angel Valderama personally signed the complaint. Razon Jr. implicated at least 3 relatives of Isnaji: "Three of the suspects are relatives of the mayor, but we have not identified them by name". Razon also affirmed an inquiry into a supposed second ransom concerning 2 duffel bags flown into Sulu via a South East Asian Airlines (SEAIR) flight hours before the hostages' release. DILG Secretary Ronaldo Puno also said that Isnaji and his son may have masterminded the abduction: "The kidnappers themselves were double-crossed."

On October 11, 2008, Al-Qaeda linked members of ASG Asma Awang, Makambian Sakilan, Tagayan Sakilan, and Marcial Totoh Jabarot, all from Talipao, Sulu were arrested by the Sixth Marine Battalion Landing Team in Jolo. Suspect Adjili Sakilan was killed, and 4 others fled. Meanwhile, the Sulu Philippine National Police and Task Force Comet announced a probe into Asma Awang and relatives Makambian Sakilan and Tagayan Sakilan in Drilon's abduction. Further, Lt. Colonel Ernesto Torres Jr said Devaro was a member of Abu Sayyaf from 2000 under Kumander Tahil Salih.

=== Documentary ===
Kidnap, a documentary on Drilon's kidnapping was made and aired by ABS-CBN on July 13, 2008. However, the Department of Justice per government prosecutors warned ABS-CBN against airing any video footage, alleging that it would affect the pending investigation's outcome. The documentary was aired on ABS-CBN on July 13, 2011.

=== Suspension of Drilon ===
On July 5, 2008, Drilon was imposed with a 3-month suspension as news anchor of Bandila and as senior correspondent by ABS-CBN, for disobeying orders dissuading her from going to Sulu. Her actions were deemed as a violation of ABS-CBN News and Current Affairs's Standards and Ethics Manual. Earlier, Ces apologized "for unwittingly endangering lives." Maria Ressa noted the "grave consequences of her error in judgment." On October 6, 2008, Drilon returned as co-anchor of Bandila after the suspension's lapse.
