= Ces Drilon =

Filipino television journalist

Ces Oreña-Drilon
- Born: Cecilia Victoria Oreña; July 8, 1961 (age 65); Baguio, Philippines
- Education: University of the Philippines Diliman
- Occupation: Broadcast journalist
- Years active: 1985–2020, 2021–present
- Employer: MBS (1985–89) ABS-CBN (1989–2020) CNN Philippines (2022–24) Bilyonaryo News Channel (2024) TV5/One News (2025–present)
- Spouse: Rock Drilon
- Children: 4

Cecilia "Ces" Victoria Oreña-Drilon (Tagalog: [sɛs ɔˈrɛɲa dɾiˈlɔn]; born July 8, 1961) is a Filipino broadcast journalist. She anchored news and public affairs programs for the News and Current Affairs division of ABS-CBN Corporation from 1989 to 2020. From 2018 to 2020, she also served as the division's Content Acquisition Head for the Lifestyle Ecosystem Group. Oreña-Drilon is currently a news anchor for The Big Story, the flagship nightly newscast of One News.

== Career ==
Ces Oreña-Drilon began her television career in 1985 when she joined the Maharlika Broadcasting System (now People's Television Network) as a news reporter. Her reporting on the capture of Army renegade Col. Gregorio Honasan caught the attention of ABS-CBN, which hired her in 1989 to cover the Philippine Senate. She appeared regularly on The World Tonight as the program's business correspondent.

Together with Cathy Yap-Yang, she hosted Usapang Business, a weekly business-oriented show which was soon cancelled due to budget cuts. She later presented several news and current affairs programs for ABS-CBN and for the ABS-CBN News Channel, including Pipol and The Correspondents. Since the 2000s, Oreña-Drilon has served as a co-anchor of the ABS-CBN late-night news program Bandila with Korina Sanchez and Henry Omaga-Diaz (later replaced by Karen Davila and Julius Babao), and as an alternate anchor for TV Patrol.

Oreña-Drilon was served as a co-anchor for TV Patrol Weekend (then also known as TV Patrol Sabado/Linggo) from 2004 to 2005, alongside Henry Omaga-Diaz, and he was replaced by Bernadette Sembrano who takes over Drilon's duties as an anchor on the newscast, and he later transferred to ABS-CBN Insider with the late Atty. Dong Puno until June 30, 2006.

In 2007, Oreña-Drilon was among several Filipino journalists covering the Manila Peninsula rebellion who were briefly detained by the Philippine military, shortly after the mutiny was quashed.

In June 2008, Oreña-Drilon, along with her companions, were kidnapped by the Abu Sayyaf in Sulu but were later released.

In July 2020, Oreña-Drilon was retrenched by ABS-CBN as the network was shut down by both the National Telecommunications Commission and Office of the Solicitor General last May due to an expired franchise and Congress rejected its fresh 25-year franchise. She returned to farming.

In 2021, Oreña-Drilon would later join Radio Mindanao Network-DZXL, wherein she is the host of afternoon public service program Basta Promdi, Lodi.

In December 2022, Oreña-Drilon joined CNN Philippines, where she would host Usapang Bilyonaryo. This marked her return to television more than two years after being retrenched by ABS-CBN. Following the shutdown of CNN Philippines in 2024, she continued her career on Bilyonaryo News Channel, where Usapang Bilyonaryo was carried over.

On September 21, 2024, Oreña-Drilon appeared on TV5 and RPTV via Eat Bulaga!.

On February 26, 2025, Oreña-Drilon resumed her role as a news anchor, joining One News as the main anchor of The Big Story. She officially began anchoring the program on March 3, 2025.

=== Kidnapping incident ===
In June 2008, Oreña-Drilon and news cameramen Jimmy Encarnacion and Angelo Valderrama were abducted in Maimbung, Sulu, Jolo, by al-Qaeda-linked Abu Sayyaf militants. She was held for ransom for nine days.

Oreña-Drilon's team was invited by Professor Octavio Dinampo, an academic at the Mindanao State University, Sulu. Dinampo, a Muslim, was also missing. The militants were led by Albader Parad, an Abu Sayyaf leader and Gapur Jundain, former member of the Moro National Liberation Front.

Chief Superintendent Joel Goltiao, police regional director for the Autonomous Region in Muslim Mindanao, announced that: "Pinapakain naman sila (They are being fed well), they are well and alive, hindi sila nakatali (they are not tied) and nakakalabas sila (they are able to move around) but they are being escorted." Ransom was allegedly demanded, ranging from ₱10 million to ₱30 million (US$410,000 and US$630,000). Oreña-Drilon was the third local journalist to be kidnapped by Abu Sayyaf after 2000. A documentary on Drilon's kidnapping was aired on ABS-CBN on July 13, 2008.

==== Release and deadline ====
The militants released Valderama on June 12, after a ransom payment of ₱100,000 pesos (US$2,250). Negotiator Isnaji Alvarez stated that the abductors gave Drilon's family until June 17 to pay US$1.12 million, but a deadline for the other two hostages was unclear. Xinhua, reported that the “militants had set a deadline of Tuesday noon for a ransom of ₱15 million pesos (US$337,079), local media reported Monday.” Isnaji earlier said “the abductors demanded 20 million pesos (US$450,000) in ransom.” Minutes before the deadline, the kidnappers extended "Indefinitely" the deadline for the release of Drilon and her companions, with the abductors requesting livelihood products in exchange for their freedom.

Oreña-Drilon and her companions were released on June 17, 2008, following negotiations with Philippine security officials. Oreña-Drilon, Jimmy Encarnacion and Octavio Dinampo were picked up in Talipao, Indanan, Sulu, by Mayor Alvarez Isnaji at about midnight.

After eating noodles for 9 days, surrounded by more than 20 abductors, Oreña-Drilon and her crew met Grechie and Frank Oreña, Drilon's siblings, with Loren Legarda and Maria Ressa on June 18, in Zamboanga City, at the La Vista del Mar Beach Resort. They arrived at Ninoy Aquino International Airport from Zamboanga City around 2pm, for a short press conference and underwent a medical checkup at Medical City Hospital in Pasig.

Senator Loren Legarda, a negotiator, said the refusal of ABS-CBN and the government to pay a ransom, and the deployment of troops around Indanan, prompted the release. Al Jazeera's reporter, Veronica Pedrosa, stated "a military offensive near the kidnappers' camp had apparently helped free the hostages." Oreña-Drilon stated that she was betrayed by someone who delivered her to the kidnappers and the Abu Sayyaf militants threatened to behead them: "We came close to losing our lives; There was some betrayal involved and that is why we were kidnapped; I thought I was so reckless. I didn't think of my family who I put through a really terrible ordeal in the past 10 days. I would like to thank everybody - words are not enough to thank those who prayed for the professor, and Jimmy and Angel and myself. I put the lives of my team in danger so it was really a very sobering experience to me.” AFP reported that ransom was paid "following talks between the Abu Sayyaf and Senator Loren Legarda, who is expected to contest the 2010 presidential election." The Canadian Press stated that "There were speculations that as much as $337,000 in ransom was paid for their release. Drilon condemned the abductors, who tied them and slapped her during the dire detention." AHN, however, reported that the release was made in exchange for livelihood assistance instead of a ransom. Philippine National Police Chief Avelino Razon stated: "Sabi niya pasensya na General, pati ikaw ay nadamay. Sabi ko trabaho lang ito, kami talagang tutulong para sa inyong pagbalik (She told me, General I'm sorry you were dragged into this. I told her, it's not a problem, it's our job to ensure your safe return)."

==== Arrest and investigation ====
Octavio Dinampo, on June 20, stated that Mayor Alvarez Isnaji, alias "Larin-Larin," pocketed much of the "first" ransom of ₱5 million (US$112,500). Isnaji's lawyer, Ernesto Francisco, however, said his client was innocent and prosecuted for political reasons: "If you examine the background of Mayor Isnaji, there is no instance in the past that he was involved in any criminal activity." Raul M. Gonzalez said "Isnaji was a highly respected politician in Jolo who plans to run for governor of the Muslim autonomous region, which includes the island, in August." Gonzalez and PNP Director General Avelino Razon Jr. affirmed that Isnaji "kept to himself ₱3 million (US$67,568) and paid the kidnappers ₱2 million (US$45,045) (from the Drilon family)." Razon Jr. showed pictures of Isnaji, his son, Haider, and Sulu Vice-Governor Lady Ann Sahidulla gathered around the ₱5 million ransom, with Senior Superintendent Willy Quidato. Meanwhile, Dinampo and Sulu provincial police director Senior Superintendent Julasirim Kasim said that guide Juamil "Mameng" Biyaw betrayed the ABS-CBN team.

The Criminal Investigation and Detection Group (CIDG) filed the complaint before the Department of Justice on June 20, against Isnaji, his son Haider and 14 Abu Sayyaf members, for the kidnapping. Ces Drilon, Jimmy Encarnacion and Angel Valderama personally signed the complaint. The pre-trial conference was set for 1pm on Monday. They are currently detained at the PNP headquarters. Razon Jr. implicated at least 3 relatives of Isnaji: "Three of the suspects are relatives of the mayor, di natin alam sino yan (At least three of the suspects are relatives of the mayor but we have not identified them by name)." Also, Razon affirmed inquiry into a supposed 2nd payoff / ransom concerning 2 duffel bags flown into Sulu via a South East Asian Airlines (SEAIR) flight hours before the hostages' release. DILG Secretary Ronaldo Puno also said that Isnaji (and his son) may have masterminded the abduction: "The kidnappers themselves were double-crossed."

On October 11, 2008, Al-Qaeda members linked ASG Asma Awang, Makambian Sakilan, and Tagayan Sakilan, all from Talipao, Sulu, including Marcial Totoh Jabarot, alias Abu Cesar, were arrested by the Sixth Marine Battalion Landing Team in Jolo. Also, suspect Adjili Sakilan was killed and 4 fled. Meanwhile, the Sulu Philippine National Police and Task Force Comet announced probe of Asma Awang and relatives Makambian Sakilan and Tagayan Sakilan in Drilon's abduction. Further, Lt. Colonel Ernesto Torres Jr said Devaro was an Abu Sayyaf member from 2000 under Kumander Tahil Salih.

==== Documentary ====
A documentary on Drilon's kidnapping was made and aired by ABS-CBN on July 13, 2011. However, the Department of Justice per government prosecutors warned ABS-CBN against airing any video footage, alleging that it would affect the pending investigation's outcome.

==== Penalty of suspension ====
ABS-CBN, on July 5, 2008, punished Drilon with three months suspension as news anchor of Bandila and as Senior Correspondent, for disobeying orders not to go to Indanan, Sulu (violation of Standards & Ethics Manual). Earlier, Ces apologized "for unwittingly endangering lives." Maria Ressa noted the “grave consequences of her error in judgment.” On October 6, 2008, Oreña-Drilon returned as co-anchor of Bandila after the suspension's lapse. She announced the airing of a segment on the physical and psychological effects of the Mindanao conflict on Armed Forces of the Philippines's soldiers.

== Personal life ==
Drilon is married to painter Rock Drilon, a nephew of Senator Franklin Drilon. They have four children. She graduated from the University of the Philippines Diliman with a Bachelor of Arts degree in communication research.
