= Battle of Bud Bagsak =

Part of the Philippine-American War (June 1913)

- Part of the Moro Rebellion
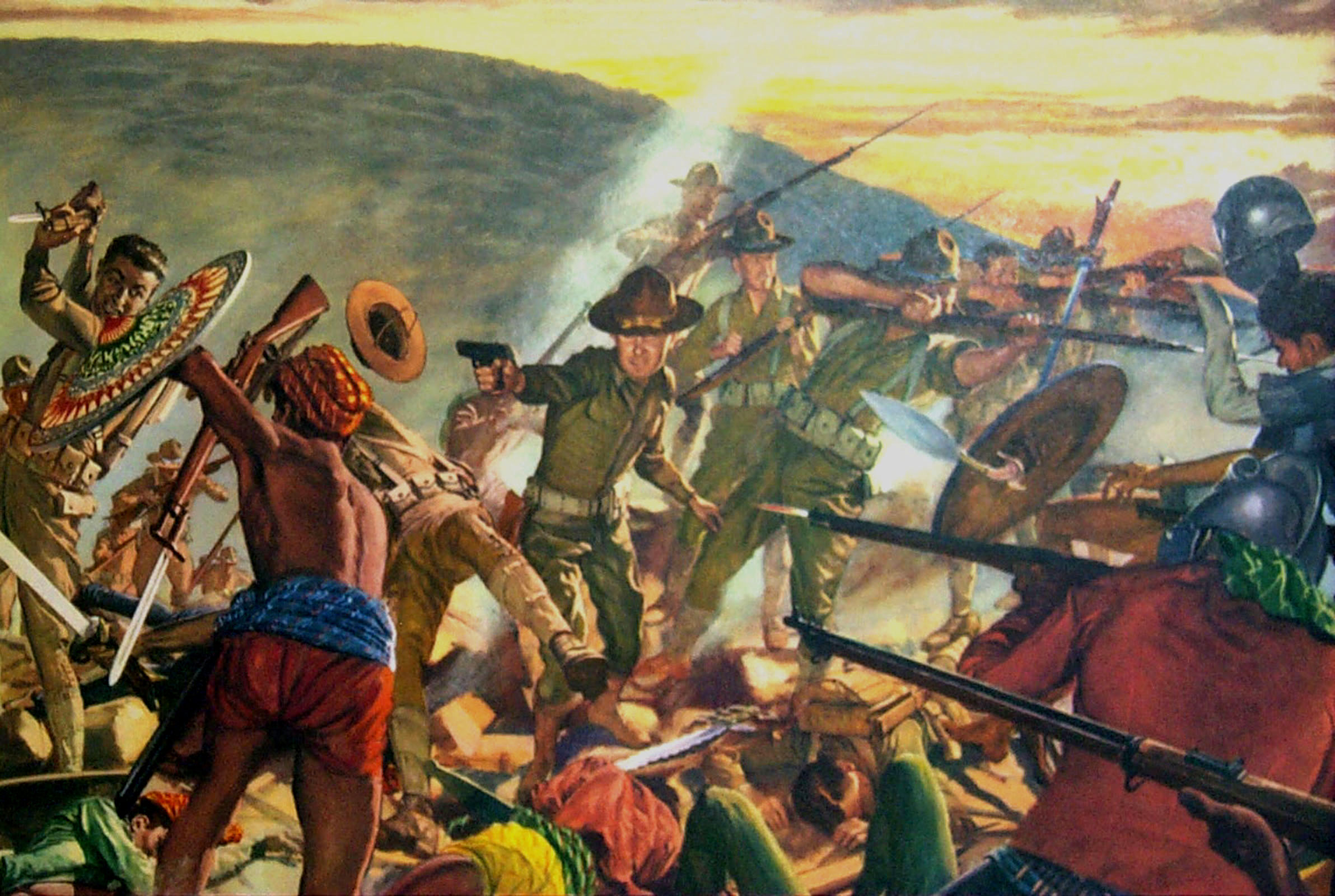
- "Knocking Out the Moros"
Date	June 11–15, 1913
Location	Philippines
Result	Initial Assault; Moro victory: American force repelled Final Assault American victory

Belligerents
United States	Sultanate of Sulu

Commanders and leaders
John J. Pershing; George C. Shaw; Rapp Brush; Capt. McNally †; Lt. Whitney (WIA); Lt. Cochrun (WIA)	Datu Amil †; Datu Sahipa

Strength
1,200, 8th Infantry, 8th Cavalry, 40th Mountain Artillery Battery and Philippine Scouts	65-70 (Initial Assault); Estimated 800 (Final Assault)

Casualties and losses
14 killed 25 wounded 20% of the men (in the initial assault) 340 killed (according to San Juan Jr.)	Unknown(Official figure) 200 to 300 killed (Pershing's estimate) 2,000 - 3,000 killed (according to San Juan Jr.)

The Battle of Bud Bagsak took place during the Moro Rebellion phase of the Philippine–American War fought between June 11 and 15, 1913. The defending Moro fighters were fortified at the top of Mount Bagsak on the island of Jolo, Sulu. The attacking Americans were led by General John "Black Jack" Pershing. The Moros were entirely annihilated, including their leader, Datu Amil.

== Background ==
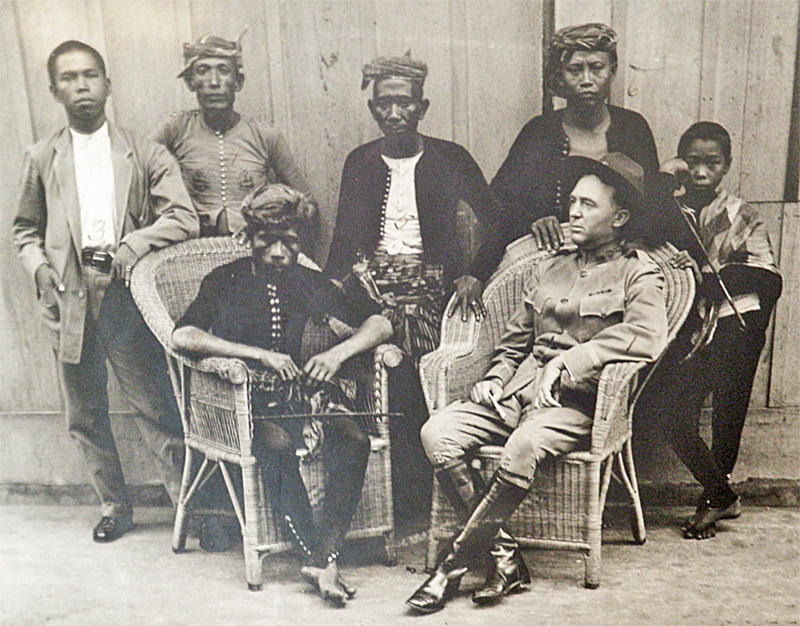
Datu Amil (sitting left), an influential leader of the Tausūgs in discussion with Captain W. O. Reed, US 6th Cavalry Regiment during the American Moro campaigns. Amil was later killed by the Americans which marked the beginning of the end of the sovereignty of the Sulu Sultanate when the Americans abolished its power after the end of this battle when their region fell under American rule.

In March 1913, Datu Amil and 1,500 warriors negotiated with the Sultan of Sulu and other Moros allied with the Americans, pledging to surrender their weapons. Two months later, having retreated to Bud Bagsak with his entire population of 6,000-10,000 in the Lati Ward, he told the Americans to "come on and fight".

Noticing the Moros only fled to Bud Bagsak when provoked by government troops, General John J. Pershing devised a policy of keeping the troops in their island garrisons in the hopes the women and children would come down from the mountain cottas (fortified earthworks which were surrounded by deep ditches and camouflaged pits containing bamboo shafts on which to impale their enemies). At the same time, Pershing secretly landed his force at the coastal town of Bun Bun, three and a half miles from Bud Bagsak. Pershing's force consisted of the 51st and 52nd Companies of Moro Scouts from Basilan and Siasi, besides the Philippine Scouts from Jolo and fifty troopers from the 8th Cavalry Regiment.

The horseshoe-shaped volcanic crater, open on the northwest at a knoll called Languasan, was protected by five cottas, Bunga, Bagsak, Puhagan, Matunkup, and Puyacabao, ranging from 1,440 to 1,900 feet in elevation.

== Initial assault ==
According to an account, under the leadership of Governor General William Cameron Forbes, General Pershing had been ordered to continue and solidify his disarmament policy on the Moros, around the same time, numerous Tausug Moros were starting to follow Datu Amil as their leader, who was described to be a "Charismatic Moro nationalist", Amil had been reportedly selling older guns to buy high powered bolt-action firearms, and was later estimated to have carried 300 high powered guns with him, when asked by American government associates about the purchases, Datu Amil reportedly "shrugged them off and told them to tell the soldiers to come and fight"

As a response, General Pershing sent three companies of Scouts and one Constabulary company, along with a battery of mountain guns a Calvary troop to assault a fortified cotta of Datu Sahipa, an associate of Datu Amil, which was guarded by 65 to 70 men.

The defending Moros put up a stiff fight despite being outnumbered heavily, and reportedly repelled the initial American assault

20% of Pershing's men suffered casualties and an American commander was killed, Sahipa and many of his surviving men escaped, while a bigger assault was being prepared by the United States.

== Battle ==
Pershing made Languasan his first objective as a place for his artillery and to block any escape, sending Major George C. Shaw with Company M of the 8th Infantry and the 40th Company of Philippine Scouts. Pershing also sent Capt. George Charlton and his 51st Moros to attack Matunkup while Capt. Taylor Nichols' Philippine Scouts attacked Puyacabao. By 12:20 PM, Matunkup was in American hands, and earned 2nd Lt. Louis Mosher a Medal of Honor. Puyacabao fell by 12:30 PM. That ended the first day of fighting, June 11.

Early on the morning of June 12, the American artillery fired on Puhagan while marksmen fired on its interior, killing Datu Amil. Pershing then ordered Capt. Patrick Moylan to attack Bunga with the 24th and 31st Scouts, taking it by 1:30 PM. Pershing, James Lawton Collins, and a ten-man escort scouted Bagsak, which convinced Pershing to bring up his artillery on June 14 and attack from the south.

The attack began in Sunday morning fog, June 15, with mountain howitzers and Charlton's Moros advancing at 9 AM. When the assault stalled, Pershing joined other American officers in the forefront of danger, helping stop a Moro counterattack. The final assault on the cotta occurred at 5 PM and Bagsak was captured after three and a half hours.

== Aftermath ==
The Battle of Bud Bagsak was the last major battle of the Moro Rebellion, and as a result is widely considered as marking the end of the rebellion, and the Philippine–American War by extension. Several smaller skirmishes between Moro bands and Philippine Constabulary forces occurred in the following months, with the last of these clashes taking place in Talipao in October 1913. General Pershing in a letter to his wife, wrote: "The fighting was the fiercest I have ever seen. They are absolutely fearless, and once committed to combat they count death as a mere incident."

Pershing was relieved of his post as governor of Moro Province in December 1913 by Philippine Governor-General Francis Burton Harrison and replaced by Frank Carpenter, a civilian official. Carpenter initiated negotiations with Sultan Jamalul Kiram II of the defeated Sultanate of Sulu, which concluded with the Sultanate's dissolution in March 1915, giving the United States complete, uncontested control over the entire Philippine archipelago.

== See also ==
- First Battle of Bud Dajo
