= Daku Balay =

Heritage house in Bacolod, Philippines

Coordinates: 10°40′12″N 122°57′11″E

Daku Balay ("Big House") is the ancestral home of Don Generoso Villanueva, situated on Burgos Street, Bacolod, Philippines.

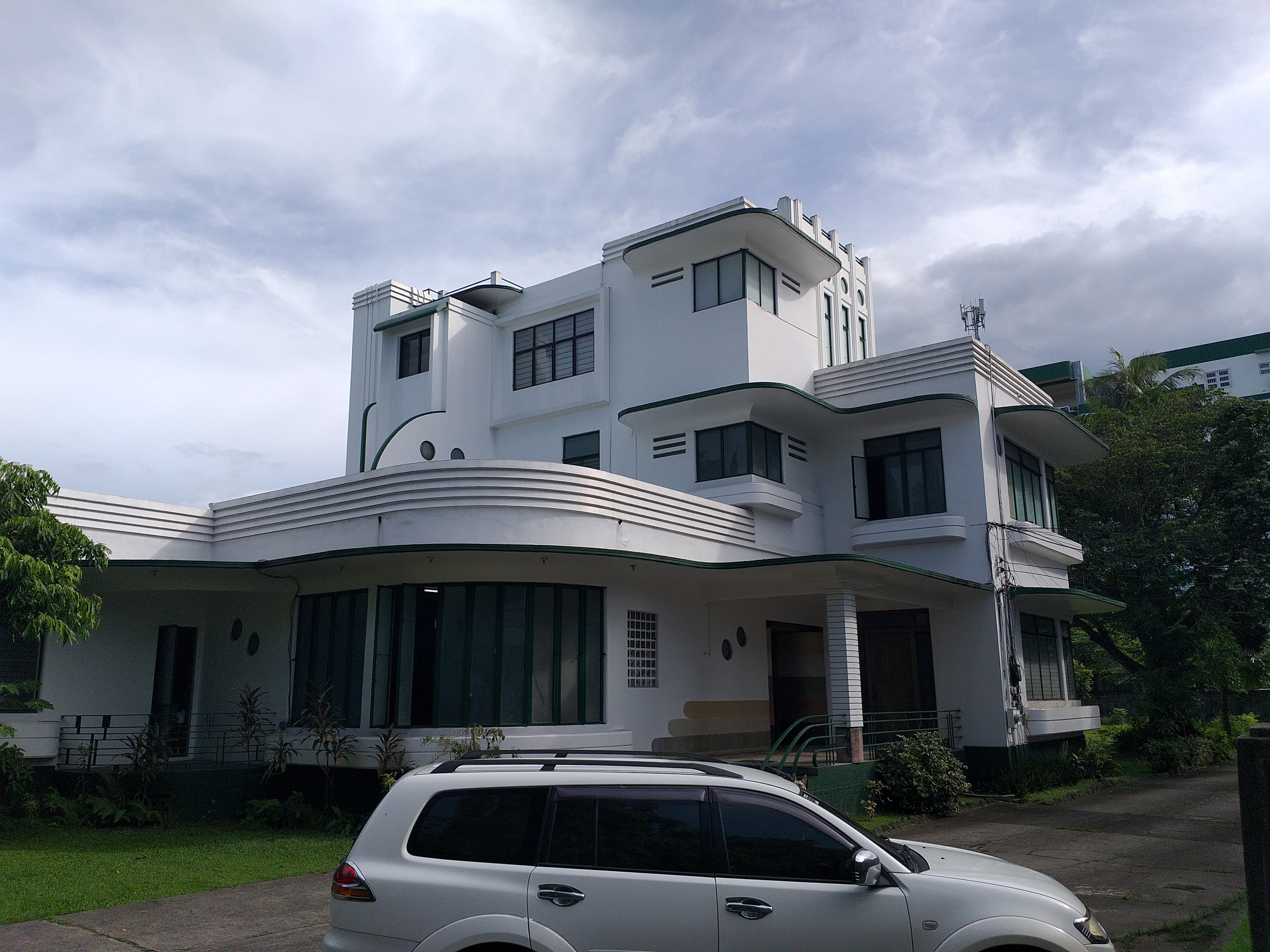
Facade of the Daku Balay

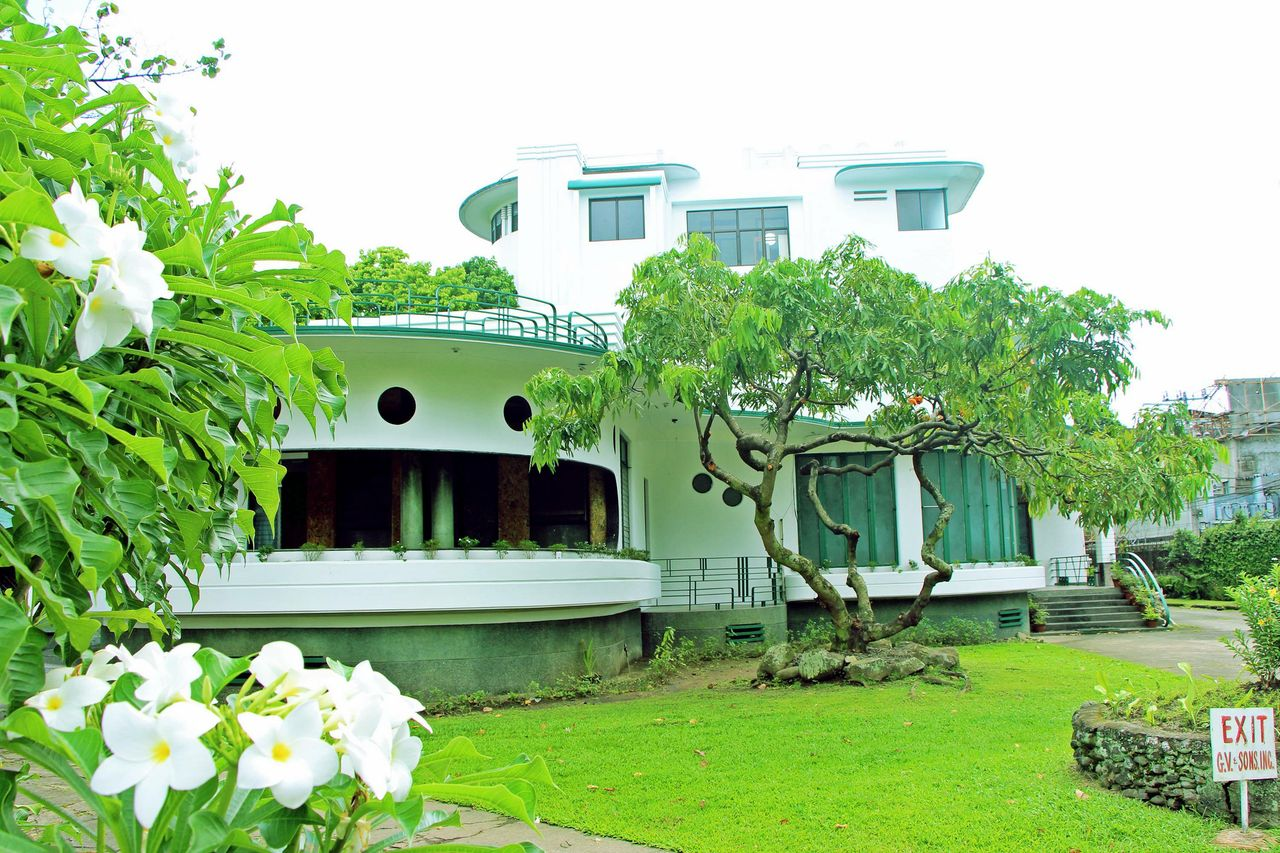
Daku Balay landscape

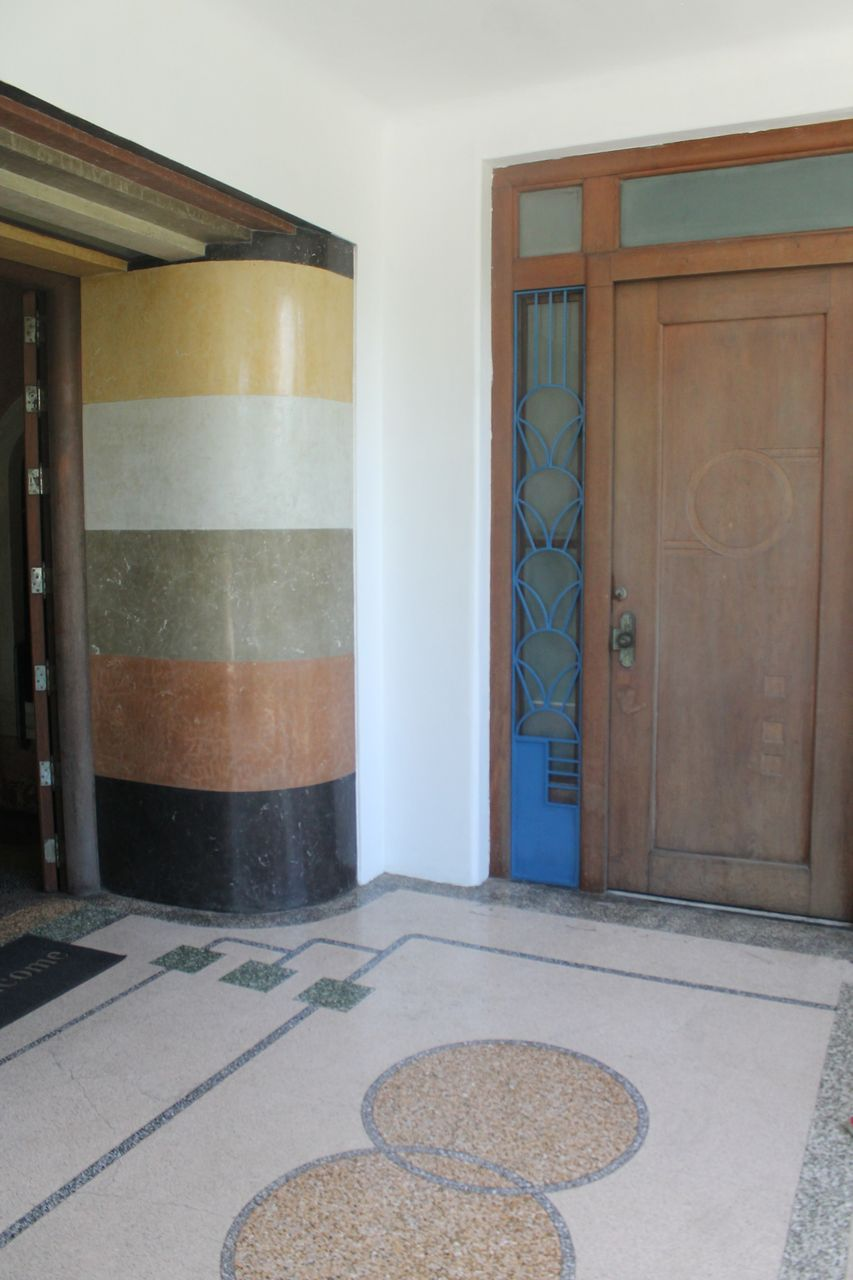
Daku Balay entrance (Photo by:Phillip Maleta)

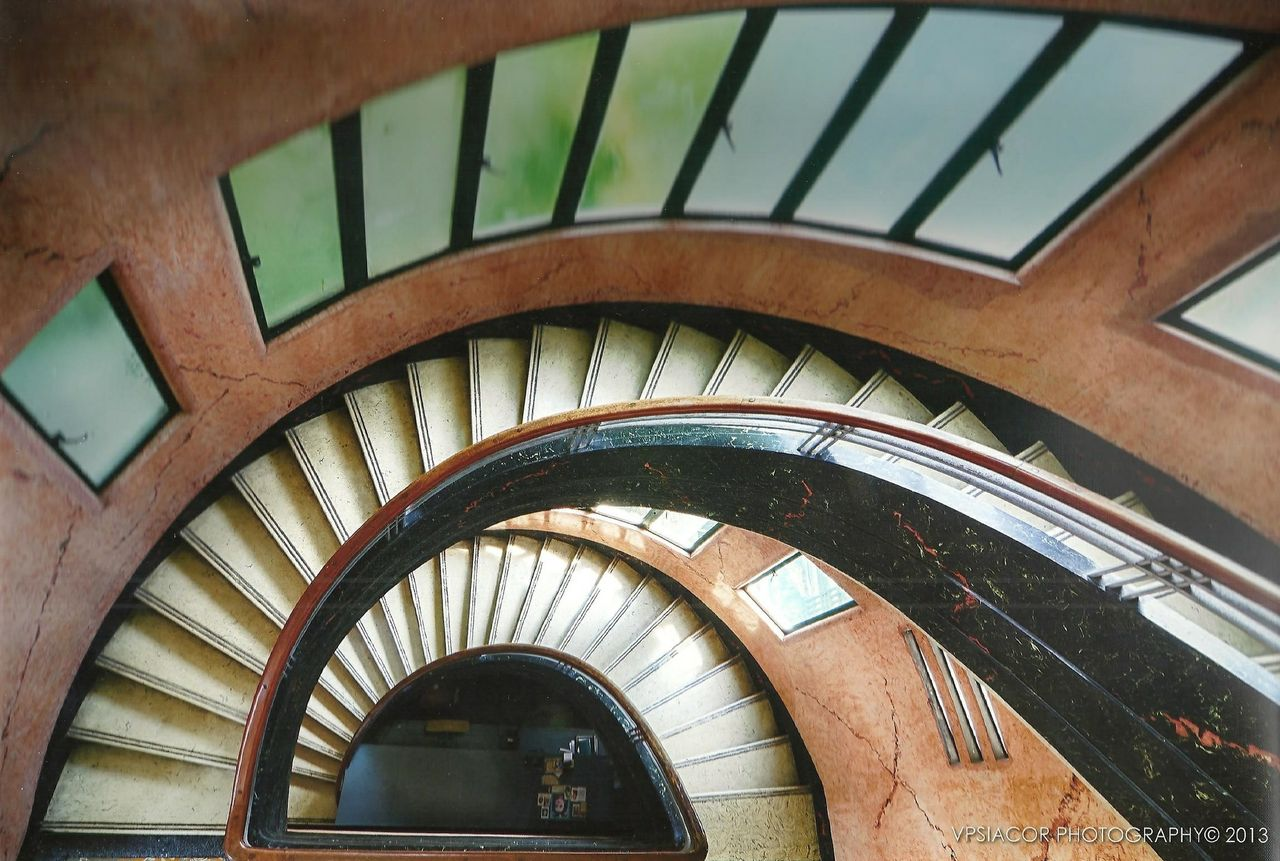
Daku Balay staircase (Photo by:Voltaire Siacor)

== Construction and design ==
=== Vision and context ===
The home of Generoso M. Villanueva, a prominent sugar planter, and his wife Paz took three years to build from 1933 to 1936. It was the first art deco structure to be built in Bacolod. Designed solely by the owner and built by Cebu engineer Salvador Cinco, the three-story, poured-concrete steel reinforced building with graceful curved balconies, parapets, and porthole steel-cased windows looks like the Titanic on land. It was known among the locals as the Boat House. Among family, though, it was simply called Daku Balay (the big house).

One family story about Daku Balay was the family patriarch built it to fulfill a vow he had made to someday build the tallest house in the city so he could look down on the house of a business and political rival. The majestic rise of the 5,000-square-meter Daku Balay, with a five-level roof deck of over 600sm was the tallest building in the city until 1959 when the Philippine National Bank was built. It was the first building on Negros Island to have an elevator, manufactured by Inclinator, Philadelphia, USA.

=== Interior and exterior design ===
Details in the exterior and interior of the house that the Villanueva patriarch personally chose and designed. He hired local artisans from Negros and neighboring islands to execute and install his vision. The intricate stonework of the hallway floors and venetian finish of the concrete walls were laid by pattern and colors, separated by copper sidings. Visitors are greeted at the front entrance by three perfectly interlinked spheres depicting the olympic universality of man, and the melding of the past, present and future. At the back entrance, guests who are dropped off from motorcars during rain are greeted by two grinning snake heads whose body gracefully curve up to form the sides of the foyer. The wood floors of the living room, chosen by color and natural grain from at least seven different Philippine hardwoods, are laid out in classical art deco patterns and symbols, as are the solid molave hardwood doors to all the rooms, each one carved with delicate art deco design and quilted carvings. The sweeping staircase to the third floor is dramatic and carefully measured for the last step to end in "oro" at each landing (oro, plata, mata count for steps is a Hispanic/Filipino feng-shui practice).

=== Glass ===
The handpainted glass with native Philippine scenes and modernist European figures adorn the rooms and bathrooms. On the second floor foyer, a steel oval viewing deck like on a cruise ship allows a peek at visitors arriving on the ground floor on their way to the formal living room or sala. On the wall next to the viewing "ship deck/hole" is an elaborate vista in bas relief depicting the patriarch's idealized world of a successful and bountiful land as a reward for the hardworking robust-looking farmer depicted on his favorite beast of burden, the carabao, surrounded by healthy looking women carrying the harvest leading to a cornucopia from the land. Relaxation from hard work is also included in this intricate vista depicted by a native man playing a harana (serenade) on the guitar.

=== Top floor ===
The jewel of the home is on the top floor, where Don Generoso laid out in intricate details his love for animals by casting them permanently on the floor and walls throughout the 6-meter ceilinged recreation room. Originally the Billiard Room, the patriarch entertained friends and family in this sun-filled chamber which opens to its own deck with tall steel-cased windows that allowed the breeze to flow freely and cool the room. The articulated metal sculpture of the Spider and the Fly (giving this room its nickname "the spider and fly room") on the highest peak of the ceiling is in its original state today and provides the highlight of Don Generoso's whimsical dedication to depict folk tales in his modern abode.

=== Influences ===
Despite the international influence visible in the house, there is no record of foreign travel by Villanueva. He frequently visited Manila, however, and was in step with the art deco architecture that was the rave in the 1930s and burgeoning throughout the city at that time. Bringing his vision to Bacolod was a bold step, and more so by the fact that Daku Balay was built entirely from local materials.

== World War II ==
During World War II, Bacolod was occupied by the Japanese forces on May 21, 1942. Lieutenant General Takeshi Kawano Kono, the Japanese commanding officer of the 77th Infantry Brigade, 102nd Division, seized the home of Don Generoso Villanueva—which served as the "seat of power" (occupational headquarters for the Japanese Forces in Negros and all of the Central Visayan region of the Philippines) and being the tallest building in the city served as the watchtower of the city. The home of Don Generoso was lived in by Lt General Kono throughout the duration of the war and also served as his office. The city was liberated by joint Filipino and American forces on May 29, 1945. It took time to rebuild the city after liberation. However, upon the orders of Lt General Kono, the home of Don Generoso was saved from destruction by the retreating Japanese forces. Upon the invasion of the American forces, the withdrawal of the Japanese army into the mountains and the temporary occupation of Bacolod by the US armed forces, the house of Don Generoso was then occupied by Major General Rapp Brush, commander of the 40th Infantry Division, known as the "Sun Burst" Division, for approximately five months. Following the departure of the American forces the house was finally reoccupied by Don Generoso and his family.

== Gallery ==
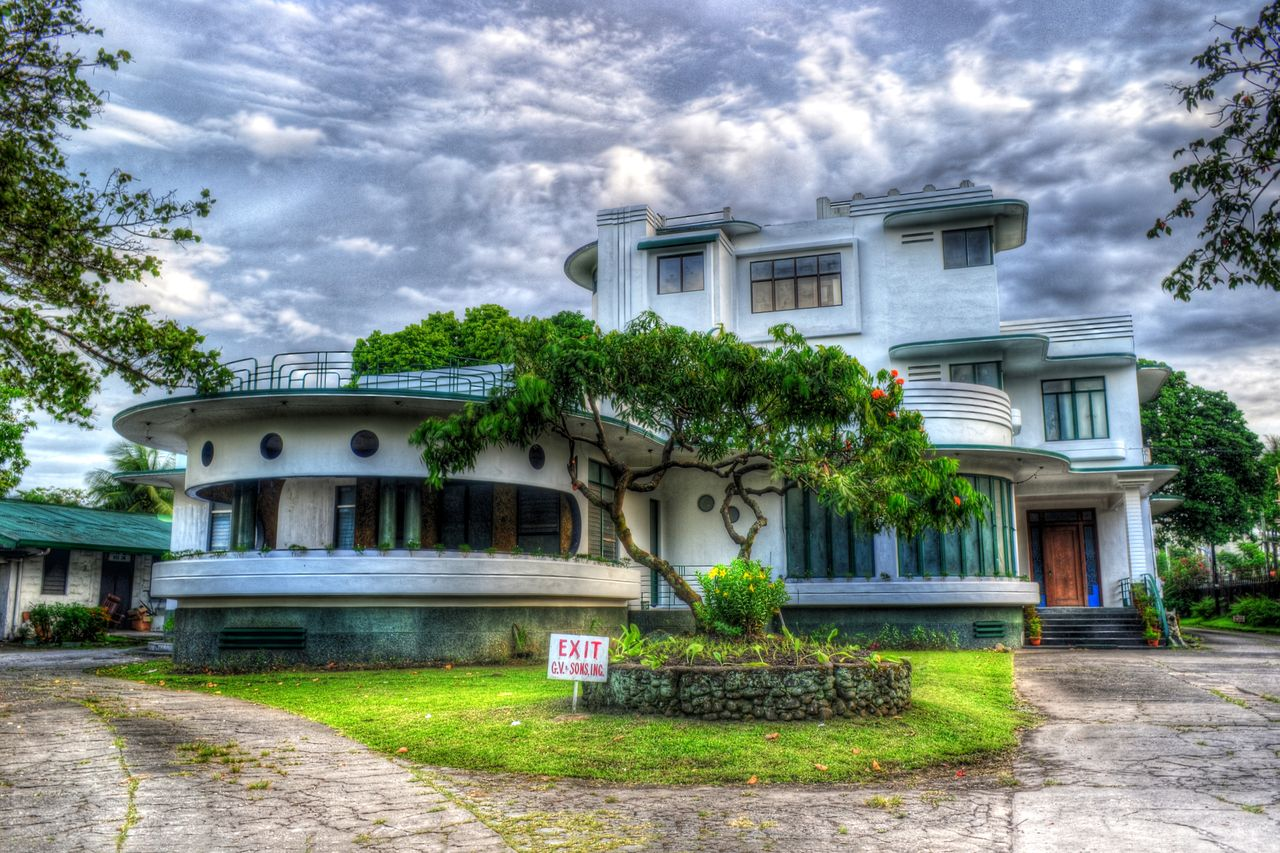
Daku Balay facade (Wilfredo N. Lumagbas Jr.)

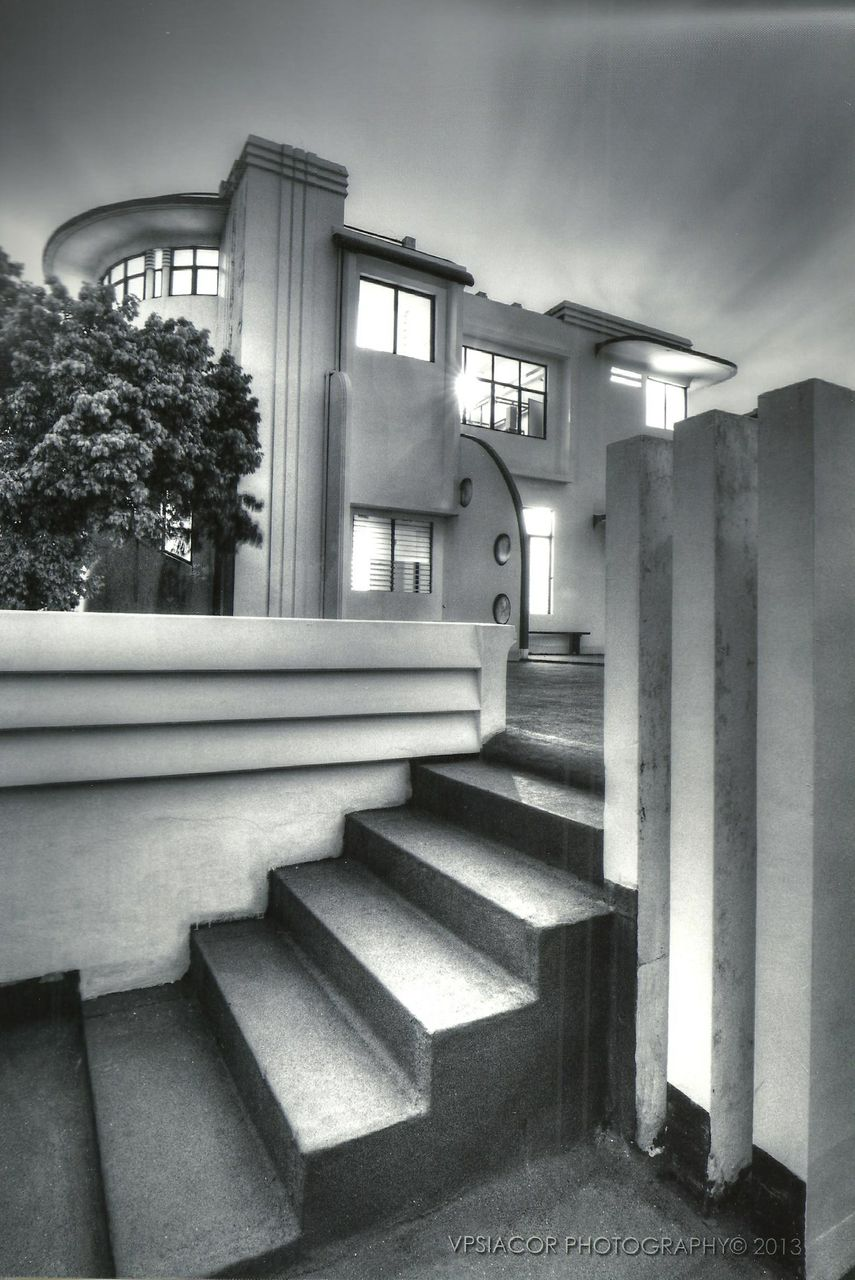
Daku Balay staircase (Voltaire P. Siacor)

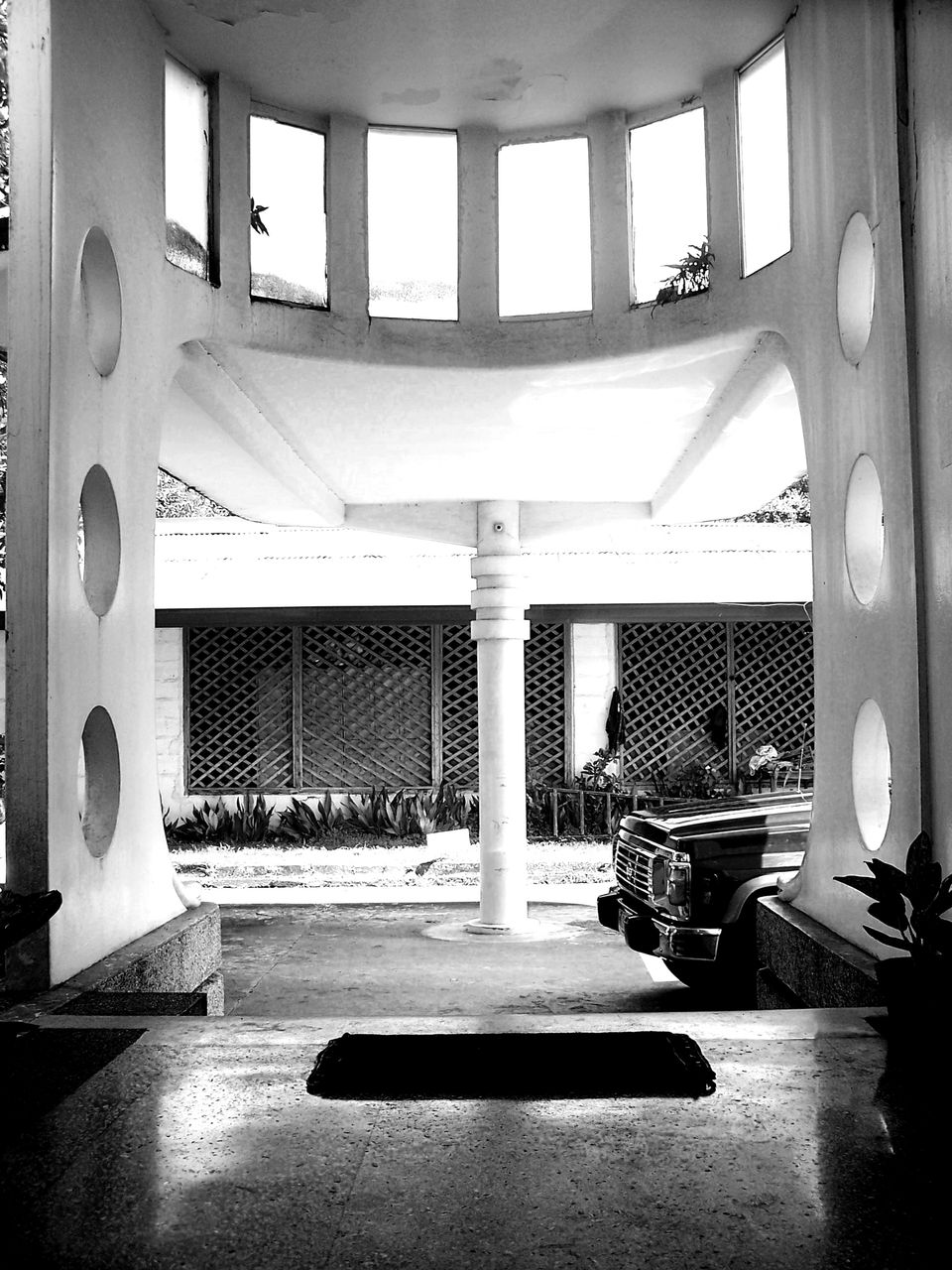
Daku Balay interior

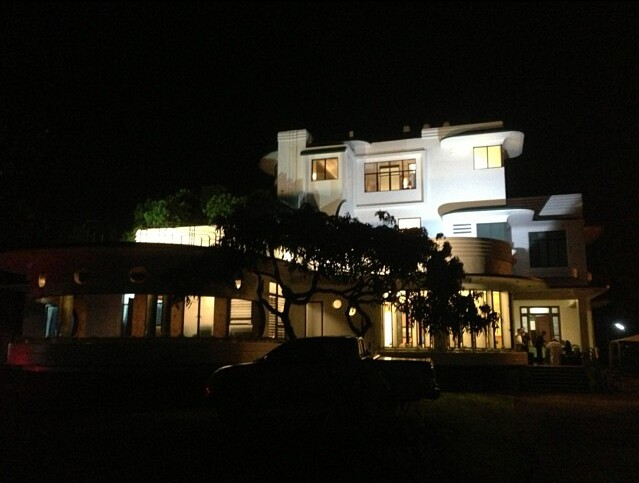
Daku Balay exterior at nighttime

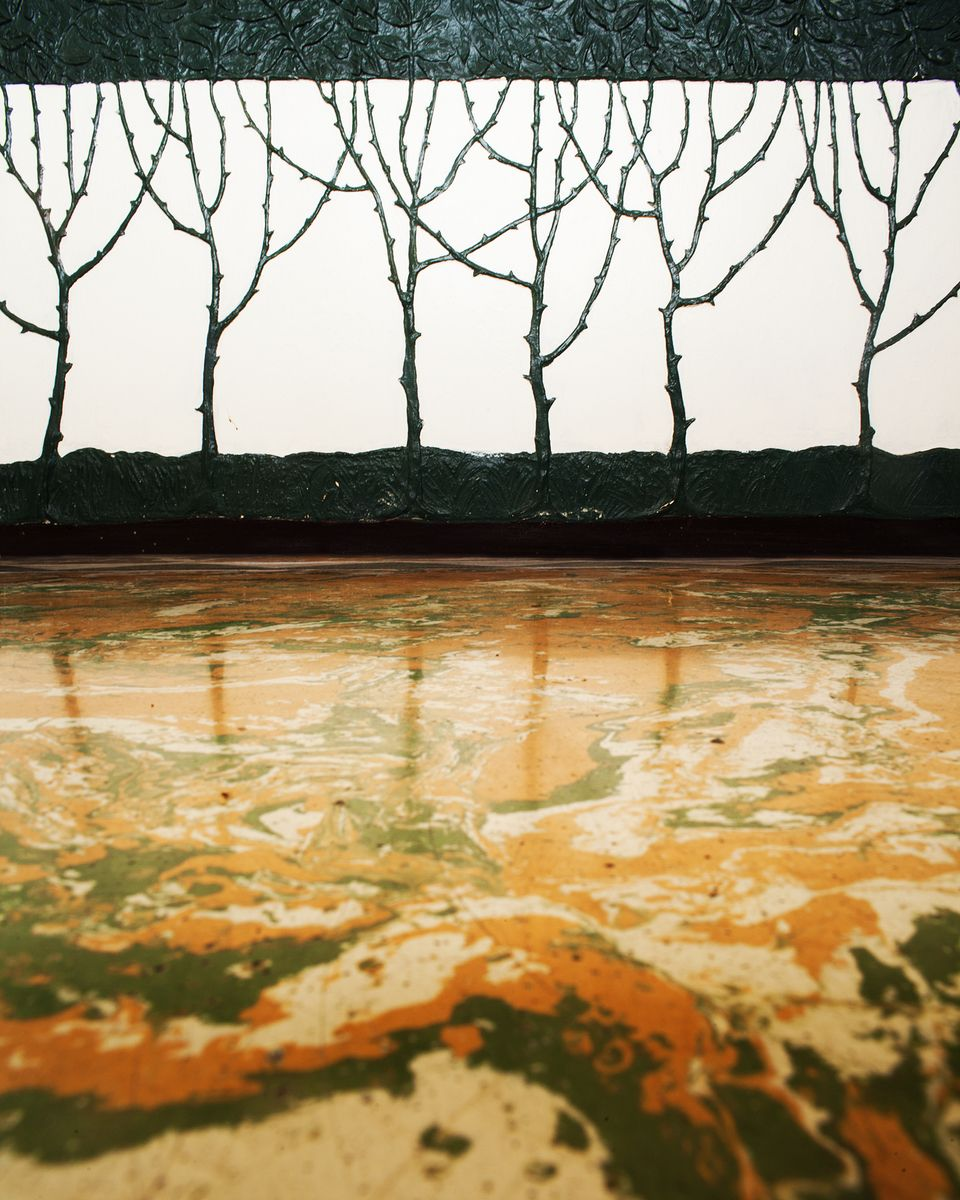
Daku Balay detail floor and wall (Photo by:Michal Joachimowski)

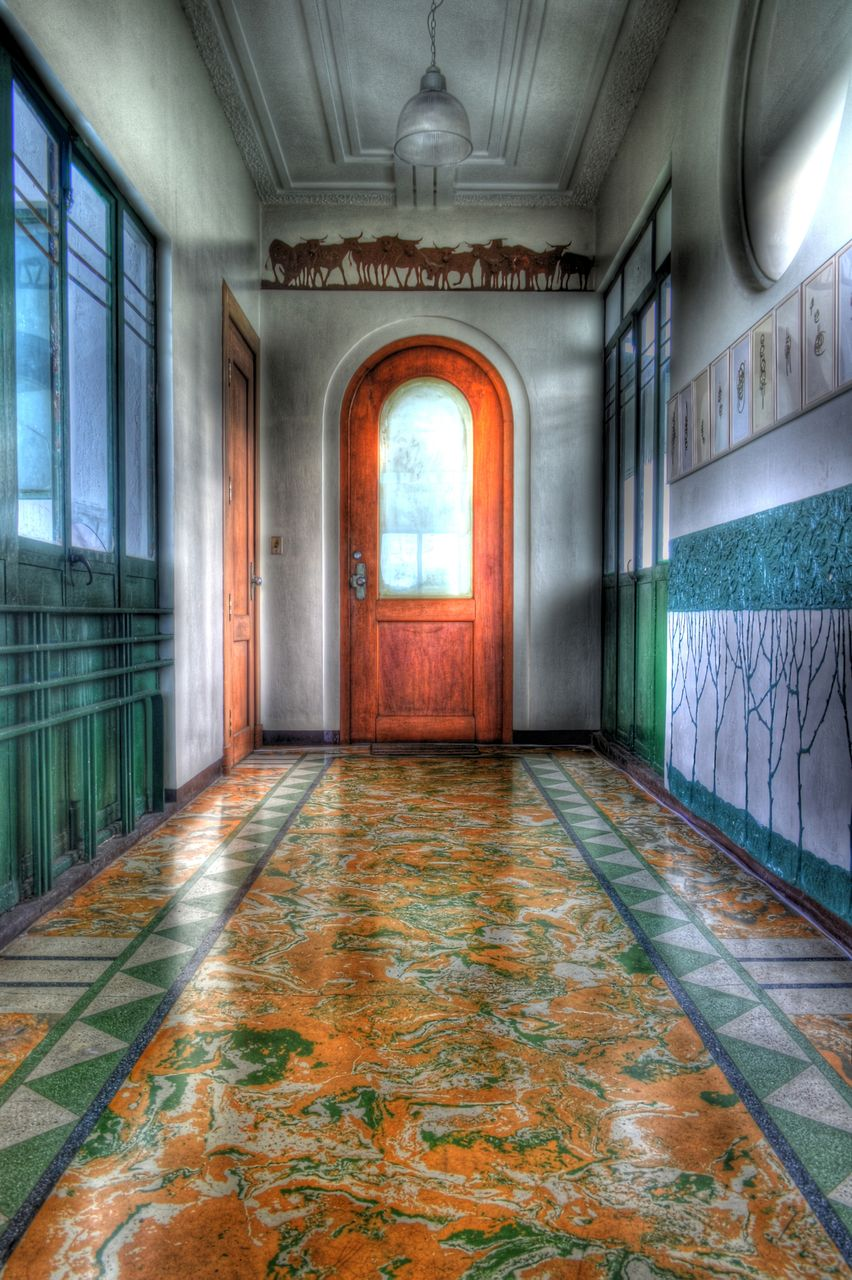
Daku Balay 3rd floor hallway (Photo by:Wilfredo Lumagabas Jr.)

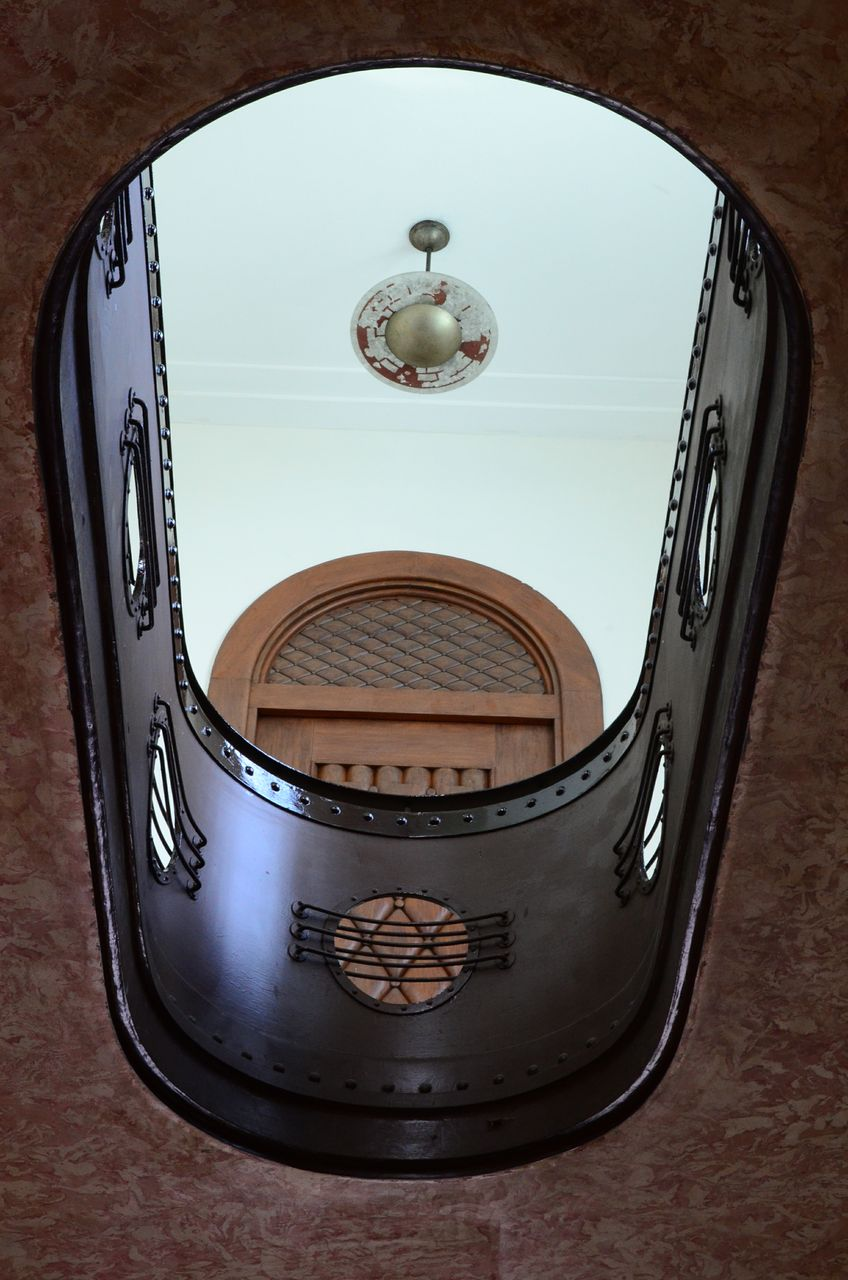
Daku Balay ship deck/viewing hole (Photo by:Paul Labrador)

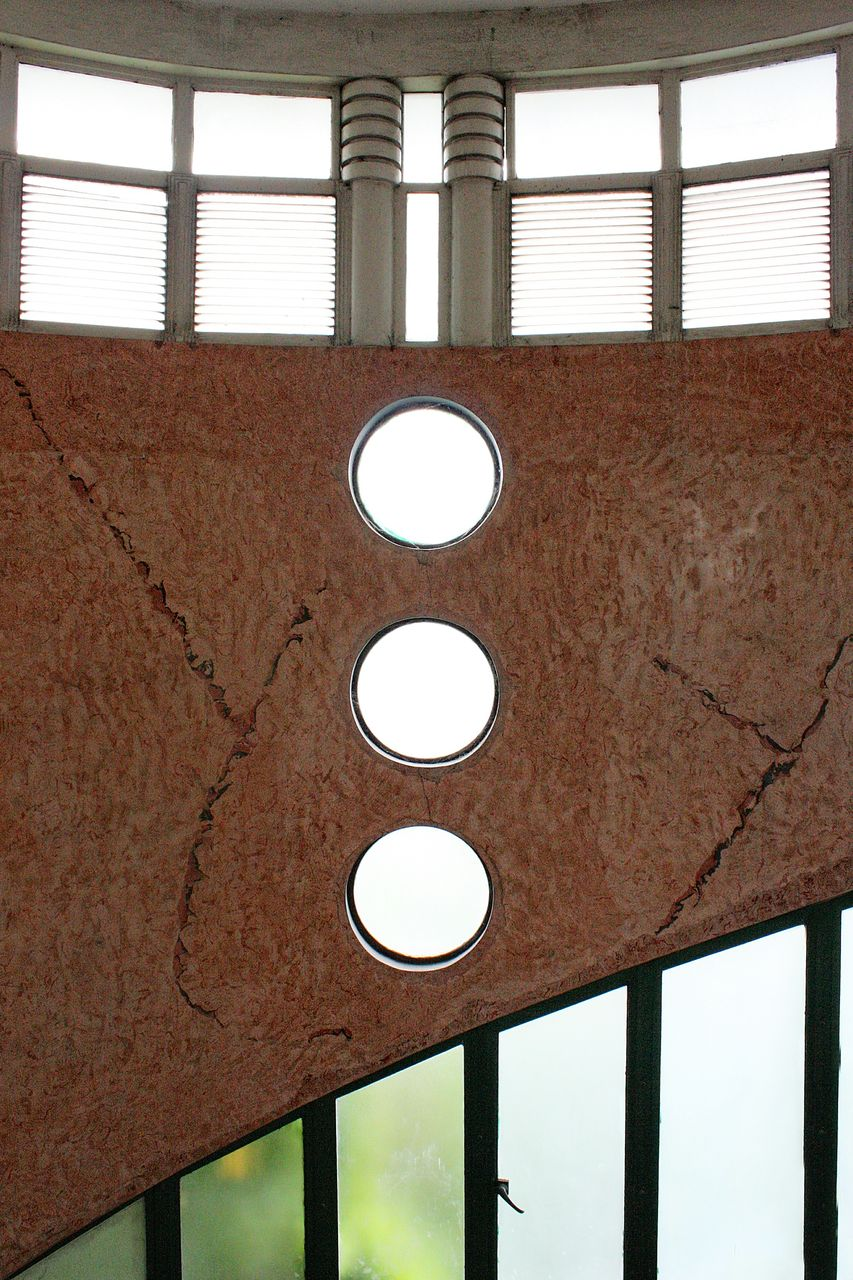
Daku Balay staircase wall detail (Photo by:Edward Dolorfino)
