= Louis C. Mosher =

Medal of Honor recipient (1880–1958)

- Born: April 26, 1880; Westport, Massachusetts, US
- Died: September 29, 1958 (aged 78); San Francisco, California, U.S.
- Military career
- Allegiance: United States of America
- Branch: United States Army
- Service years: 1901–1933
- Rank: First Lieutenant
- Unit: Philippine Scouts
- Conflicts: Philippine–American War; *Battle of Bud Bagsak
- Awards: Medal of Honor

Louis Clinton Mosher (April 26, 1880 – September 29, 1958) was a Second Lieutenant in the United States Army and a Medal of Honor recipient for his actions in the Philippine–American War.

== Medal of Honor citation ==
Rank and organization: Second Lieutenant, Philippine Scouts. Place and date: At Gagsak Mountain, Jolo, Philippine Islands, June 11, 1913. Entered service at: Brockton, Mass. Birth: Westport, Mass. Date of issue: Unknown.

Citation:

Voluntarily entered a cleared space within about 20 yards of the Moro trenches under a furious fire from them and carried a wounded soldier of his company to safety at the risk of his own life.

== See also ==
- List of Medal of Honor recipients
- List of Philippine–American War Medal of Honor recipients
