= Carmen Pedrosa =

Filipino journalist and biographer (1941–2022)

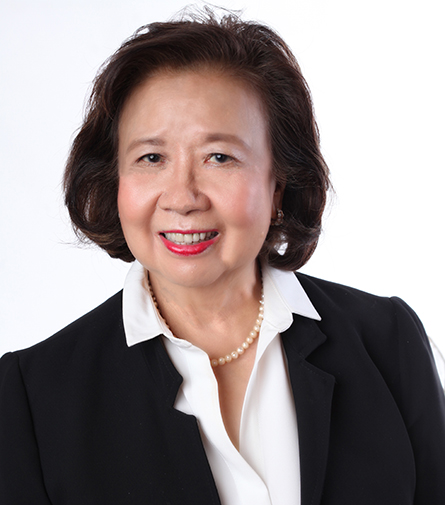
- Pedrosa in 2017
- Born: Carmen Navarro Pedrosa; July 17, 1941; Commonwealth of the Philippines
- Died: June 8, 2022 (aged 80); Muntinlupa, Philippines
- Education: University of the Sacred Heart, Tokyo; Assumption Convent School
- Occupations: Journalist, author, columnist
- Years active: 1958–2021
- Children: Veronica Pedrosa; Eduardo Pedrosa

Carmen Navarro Pedrosa (July 17, 1941 – June 8, 2022) was a Filipino journalist and author, best known for a series of biographical books on former Philippine First Lady Imelda Marcos and for her role in the overseas opposition to the Marcos dictatorship during her years of exile in London. For more than three decades she wrote the weekly opinion column "From a Distance" for The Philippine Star, and in her later career she was a prominent advocate for constitutional reform in the Philippines.

== Early life and education ==
Pedrosa was born on July 17, 1941. She studied at the Assumption Convent School and undertook studies in Tokyo at the University of the Sacred Heart in 1963–1964, where her subjects included Japanese history and English literature. In 1963 she also took journalism training at Reuters.

== Journalism career ==
Pedrosa began her career in journalism in 1958 as a reporter for the now-defunct Manila Chronicle, initially on the health and police beats before moving to foreign affairs in 1959. In 1960 she became assistant editor of the Chronicle Magazine and contributed to Asia Magazine. Contemporaries recalled her as an established young foreign-affairs journalist by the early 1960s.

From 1987 to 2021 she wrote the weekly column "From a Distance" for The Philippine Star, one of the country's longest-running newspaper opinion columns. Writing frequently from the vantage point of her years abroad, she commented on Philippine politics, governance, and constitutional questions.

== Books on Imelda Marcos ==
Pedrosa first published The Untold Story of Imelda Marcos in 1969, an unauthorized biography that traced the rise of Imelda Romualdez Marcos and her family. The book was suppressed after the declaration of Martial Law in 1972; despite the ban, copies continued to circulate clandestinely. By her own account it sold more than 300,000 copies and was translated into French, Japanese, and Portuguese before going out of print. The book has since been cited as a source on Imelda Marcos's life.

Following the People Power Revolution of 1986, Pedrosa published a sequel, The Rise and Fall of Imelda Marcos (1987). In 2016 she released a third, partly autobiographical book, Imelda Romualdez Marcos: The Verdict, recounting the New York trial of Imelda Marcos, at which Pedrosa had served as a Philippine government spokesperson; the trial ended in Marcos's acquittal in 1990. In 2013, The Untold Story of Imelda Marcos was reprinted and re-issued as an e-book after decades out of print.

== Exile in London ==
After the publication of The Untold Story of Imelda Marcos, Pedrosa and her family went into self-exile in London to avoid reprisals from the Marcos government, and she later described the exile as having come at a cost to her family. In London she remained active in the Filipino diaspora and the overseas opposition to the dictatorship: she founded and edited Pahayagan, a London-based newspaper for Filipinos, from 1971, and served as president of the Migrant Action Group and as a director of the Ninoy Aquino Movement International. A December 1984 interview described the family living in a townhouse near Hyde Park, indicating she remained in London into the mid-1980s. During this period she also worked as Asia editor of FIRST Magazine in London and, earlier, as a columnist for the Riyadh Daily in Saudi Arabia.

== Constitutional reform advocacy ==
In her later career, Pedrosa was an advocate for Charter change, favoring a shift toward a unicameral parliamentary and federalist form of government. From 1998 she served as a co-convenor of the Coalition for Constitutional Change, and she was also associated with the People's Initiative for Reform, Modernization and Action (PIRMA). She was the proponent and first chairperson of the Media Forum, an affiliate group of the International Conference of Asian Political Parties (ICAPP); she presented the proposal at the ICAPP conference in Nanning in 2014, and the ICAPP Media Forum was launched in Seoul the following year.

== Philippine Amusement and Gaming Corporation ==
On July 1, 2016, President Rodrigo Duterte appointed Pedrosa to the Board of Directors of the Philippine Amusement and Gaming Corporation (PAGCOR), a post she held until her death.

== Personal life and death ==
Pedrosa was the mother of broadcast journalist Veronica Pedrosa, a former news anchor for CNN International and BBC World.

Pedrosa died on June 8, 2022, in Muntinlupa, at the age of 80.
