= George C. Shaw =

US Army general and Medal of Honor recipient

George Clymer Shaw
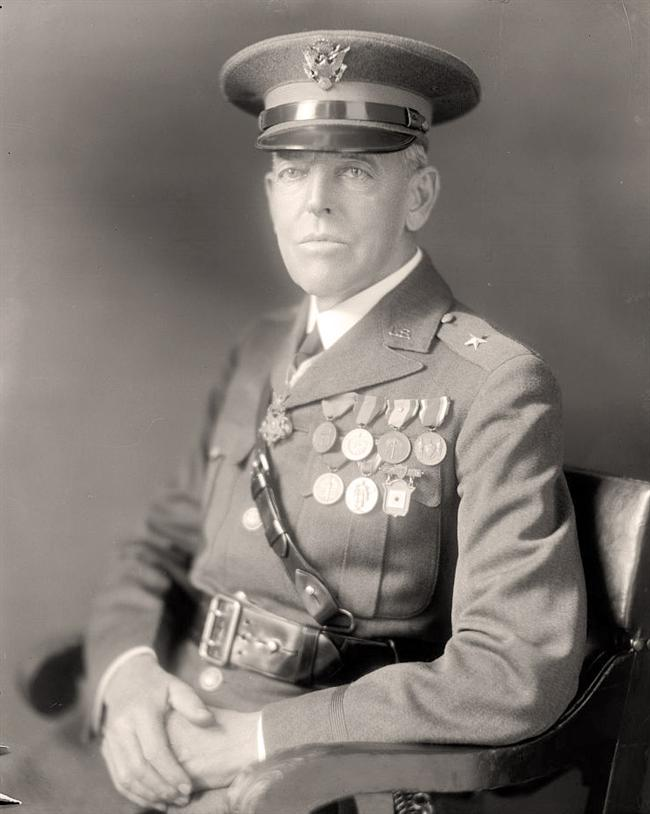
- Born: March 6, 1866; Pontiac, Michigan
- Died: February 10, 1960 (aged 93)
- Burial place: Arlington National Cemetery
- Military career
- Allegiance: United States of America
- Branch: United States Army
- Service years: 1898 – 1930
- Rank: Brigadier General
- Unit: 27th U.S. Infantry
- Conflicts: Philippine–American War; World War I
- Awards: Medal of Honor; Silver Star

George Clymer Shaw (March 6, 1866 – February 10, 1960) was a brigadier general in the United States Army and a Medal of Honor recipient for his actions in the Philippine–American War.

Shaw joined the Army from Washington, D.C., in May 1898, and retired in March 1930.

== Medal of Honor citation ==
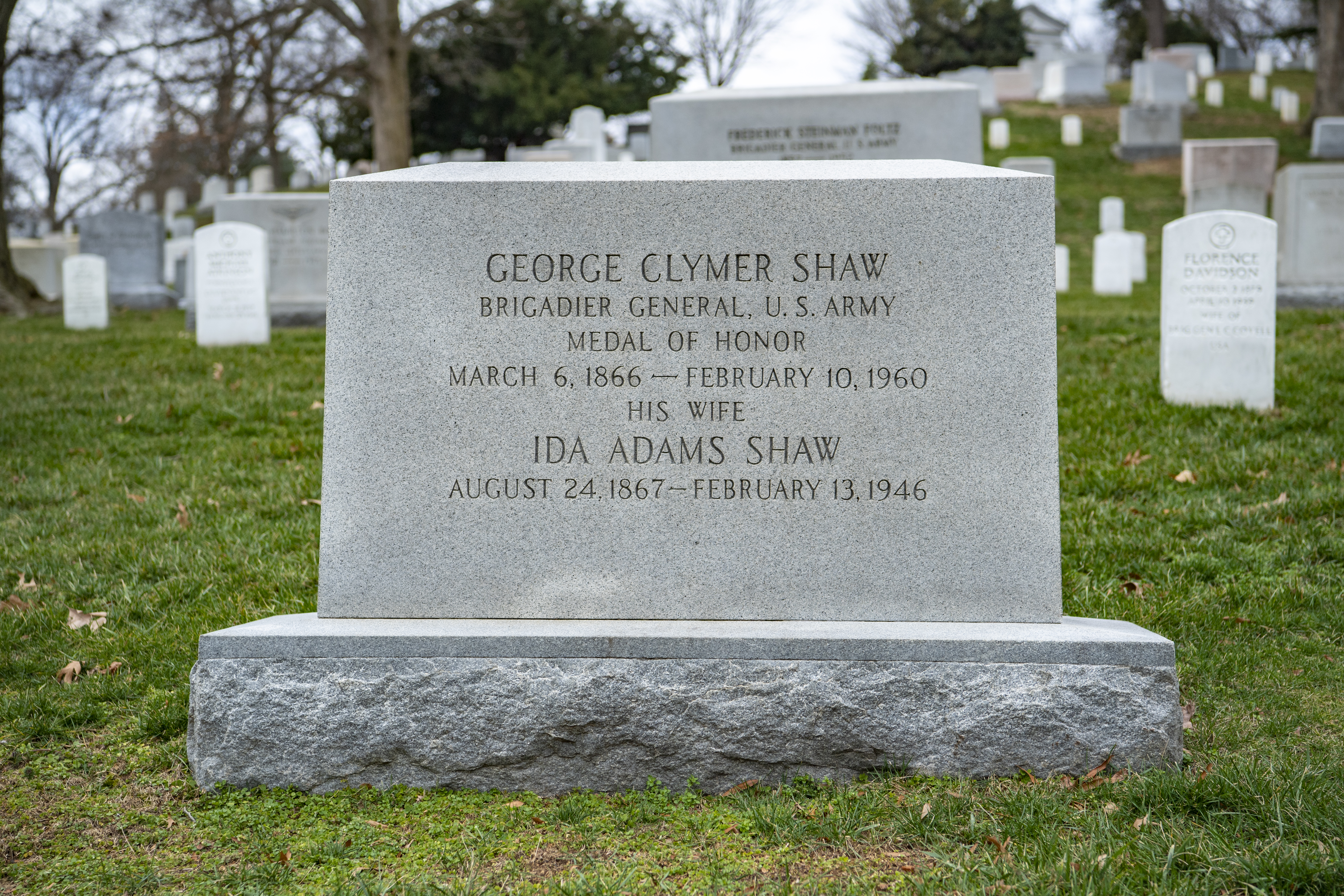
Grave at Arlington National Cemetery

Rank and organization: First Lieutenant, 27th U.S. Infantry. Place and date: At Fort Pitacus, Lake Lanao, Mindanao, Philippine Islands, May 4, 1903. Entered service at: Washington, D.C. Birth: Pontiac, Mich. Date of issue: June 9, 1904.

Citation:

For distinguished gallantry in leading the assault and, under a heavy fire from the enemy, maintaining alone his position on the parapet after the first 3 men who followed him there had been killed or wounded, until a foothold was gained by others and the capture of the place assured.

== See also ==
- List of Philippine–American War Medal of Honor recipients
