= Bandila =

Philippine television news show

- Final title card used from 2016 to 2020
- Genre: Newscast
- Directed by: Kits Fernandez
- Presented by: Korina Sanchez; Henry Omaga-Diaz; Ces Drilon; Karen Davila; Julius Babao
- Narrated by: Alvin Elchico
- Opening theme: "Isang Bandila" by Rivermaya (July 3, 2006 – June 29, 2018); "Bandila" by Ebe Dancel (July 2 – August 31, 2018; December 3, 2018 – March 17, 2020)
- Composer: Jimmy Antiporda
- Country of origin: Philippines
- Original language: Filipino

Production
- Executive producer: Shiela Diamse
- Production locations: ABS-CBN Newscenter Manila, Quezon City, Philippines
- Camera setup: Multiple-camera setup
- Running time: 30–45 minutes
- Production company: ABS-CBN News and Current Affairs

Original release
- Network: ABS-CBN
- Release: July 3, 2006 – March 17, 2020

Bandila (transl. flag) is a Philippine television news broadcasting show broadcast by ABS-CBN. Originally anchored by Korina Sanchez, Henry Omaga-Diaz and Ces Drilon, it aired on the network's Primetime Bida line up from July 3, 2006, to March 17, 2020, replacing ABS-CBN Insider and was replaced by The World Tonight. Julius Babao and Karen Davila served as the final anchors.

== History ==
=== 2006–09: Sanchez-Omaga-Diaz and Drilon era ===
Bandila debuted on July 3, 2006 replacing Insider, with Korina Sanchez returning to newscasting after nearly two years since she left TV Patrol. She was joined by Ces Oreña-Drilon (who was one of the final anchors for Insider with Atty. Dong Puno) and Henry Omaga-Diaz as the original news anchors. During the pilot episode, it aired a video of General Danilo Lim organizing a coup d'état against former President Gloria Macapagal-Arroyo.

Maria Ressa, then-head of ABS-CBN News and Current Affairs, explained Bandila as "three colors, three stars, three anchors" referring that of the Philippine flag having three colors. On the other hand, Luchi Cruz-Valdes, then head of Current Affairs, said that the title also depicts the news as "banner stories". They also said that they choose three anchors for the late-night newscast as referring to the three stars in the Philippine flag, and chooses Sanchez, Omaga-Diaz and Oreña-Drilon as the news anchors because they are the three of the most seasoned and experienced broadcast journalist in the network.

During this period, Bandila covered the New Year Countdown for 2008 and 2009, after failing to air the 2007 New Year Countdown when New Year's Eve of 2006 fell on Sunday as Bandila airs on Monday-Friday.

=== 2009–10: Omaga-Diaz and Drilon era ===
On May 8, 2009, Sanchez took an indefinite leave from Bandila and her DZMM radio program Tambalang Failon at Sanchez in anticipation of her wedding to Senator Mar Roxas and his presidential bid for the 2010 Philippine elections, leaving Oreña-Drilon and Omaga-Diaz as the remaining news anchors, which would serve as a mini-reunion on television after they did the inaugural newscast of TV Patrol Weekend in 2004.

Although December 31, 2009 fell on Thursday, Bandila once again failed to air the 2010 New Year Countdown, as a separate Countdown broadcast anchored by Bernadette Sembrano and Jorge Cariño was aired right after the newscast.

A new and improved Bandila was introduced in time for President-elect Noynoy Aquino's inauguration, on June 30, 2010. This includes the logo, opening billboard, and studio setup that will accommodate augmented reality technology. This was the first time that TV Patrol and Bandila shared a common studio set-up.

=== 2010–11: Babao-Davila and Drilon era ===
On November 3, 2010, ABS-CBN announced the appointment of outgoing TV Patrol anchors Julius Babao and Karen Davila to Bandila. Their arrival to the late-night newscast was scheduled to November 8, but was postponed when Babao was on a vacation that time. Instead, Bandila was given a new and enhanced studio set, which was exclusively done for TV Patrol.

On November 22, 2010, Babao and Davila finally arrived to the newscast, replacing Omaga-Diaz who decided to return on field reporting. The same night, the program updated its graphics, opening billboard, and title card. Bandila started letting viewers send their reactions on each news through Twitter or Facebook and later read by the anchors after each news items, thus making Bandila more interactive.

Sanchez (from being one of the program's original news anchors) was moved to TV Patrol in turn. The addition of Babao and Davila in Bandila falsified the rumor that they will leave ABS-CBN and transfer to a different TV network after being "removed" from TV Patrol.

Bandila covered the 2011 New Year Countdown Special, with Babao and Davila anchoring it from Luneta Park, Manila. This was the third time the newscast covered the New Year Countdown; the first two being at the beginning of 2008 and 2009.

On January 7, 2011, Bandila stopped its delayed simulcast over DZMM and DZMM TeleRadyo in preparation for the DZMM schedule revamps that occurred three days later, leaving TV Patrol as the only TV program to simulcast on DZMM. It was later returned on-air as a standalone early edition which began on April 17, 2017 at 10:00PM, airing exclusively on the two stations before its main edition on ABS-CBN.

On April 25, 2011, Bandila launched its official webpage as its additional online citizen journalism site.

=== 2011–14: Babao-Davila-Drilon and Abunda era ===
On October 3, 2011, Bandila moved to an earlier timeslot with the addition of Boy Abunda as one of the anchors, upon which it focuses on entertainment. This resulted in updating their title card and a new opening billboard. Another innovation for the newscast is by sending reactions through text messaging. Another addition is the segments Trending Balita (which focuses on different showbiz personalities) and the popular Ikaw Na! (where Boy Abunda interviews showbiz personalities.)

On July 29, 2013, Bandila, alongside TV Patrol, changed their idents and looks, which was first revealed on their official Facebook account. The Bandila font logo was also replaced from Trajan.

On February 7, 2014, Boy Abunda left the news program to host the late-night talk show Aquino & Abunda Tonight.

=== 2014–17: Drilon-Babao and Davila era ===
On February 10, 2014, the original Bandila 2013 opening billboard (OBB) was updated to show the three remaining news anchors prior to Abunda's exit, which was used until May 9, 2014. This time, the opening of the title card is animated in flag form. On May 12, 2014, the news program's OBB and graphics its segments were updated again.

From June 25 to July 3, 2016, the main studio for TV Patrol and Bandila underwent major renovations, resulting in both programs to temporarily broadcast on the newsroom of ABS-CBN News.

On July 4, 2016, Bandila and TV Patrol revamped its opening billboards, graphics, lower thirds and ticker; while the logos for both programs remained the same (except that the logo for Bandila now uses Gotham typeface), the logos were presented in a 3D-like format. Both programs are also broadcast in a newly-renovated set, which includes a large screen display and green chroma set. The revamp coincides the 10th anniversary of Bandila.

On April 17, 2017, Bandila returned to DZMM and DZMM TeleRadyo while undergoing programming changes. It became a standalone broadcast and premiered at 10:00 PM, while the main edition on ABS-CBN will be retained unlike prior to 2011 when it was simulcasted on a slightly-delayed basis. The simulcast ended on May 20, 2019.

=== 2017–20: Babao and Davila era ===
On December 21, 2017, Ces Oreña-Drilon announced that she would be leaving Bandila to focus on her new position in the network as "lifestyle content head". On December 25, 2017, the current Bandila 2016 OBB was still used showing the three news anchors prior to Drilon's exit. Few days after, the opening billboard becomes shortened to exclude Drilon.

On April 2, 2018, Bandila (along with the other news programs of ABS-CBN) has finally switched to high definition (1080i, 16:9 HDTV) format, with a temporary background music replacing the news program's theme song "Isang Bandila".

On July 2, 2018, Bandila launched its new original theme song, entitled simply "Bandila", performed by Ebe Dancel.

On April 21, 2019, the program temporarily transferred back to the ABS-CBN Newsroom when Studio 7 is being prepared for the coverage of 2019 midterm election (titled as Halalan 2019.) The newscast then returned to the newly renovated studio on May 13, 2019 during the election coverage, while retaining the current OBB, logo and graphics since 2016, and its theme song since 2018.

On March 17, 2020, the show's production was suspended due to the enhanced community quarantine implemented to manage the COVID-19 pandemic in the Philippines. Its timeslot was replaced by replays of TV Patrol. Furthermore, with the network shutting down operations due to the expiration of its legislative franchise and in compliance with the NTC's cease and desist order, the current status of the newscast remained unknown until it was eventually cancelled.

Instead, ABS-CBN's former and ANC's current English late-night newscast, The World Tonight, was aired on the network's replacement channel, Kapamilya Channel, on July 27, 2020, marking its return to the original network after 21 years. A2Z, the ad interim replacement for ABS-CBN Channel 2, launched Balitang A2Z as its replacement for the late-night news program on July 26, 2021.

== Anchors ==
Hosts

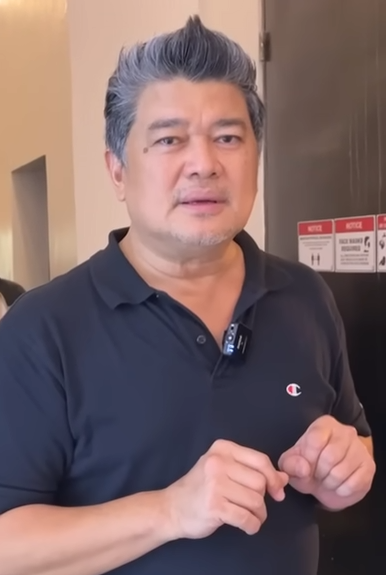
Julius Babao

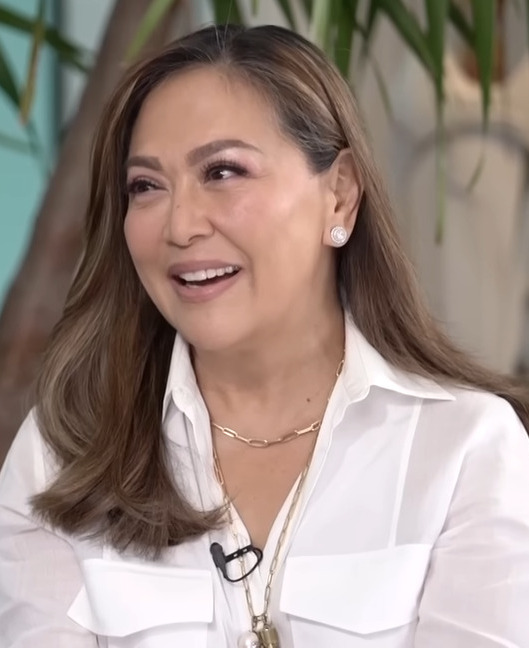
Karen Davila

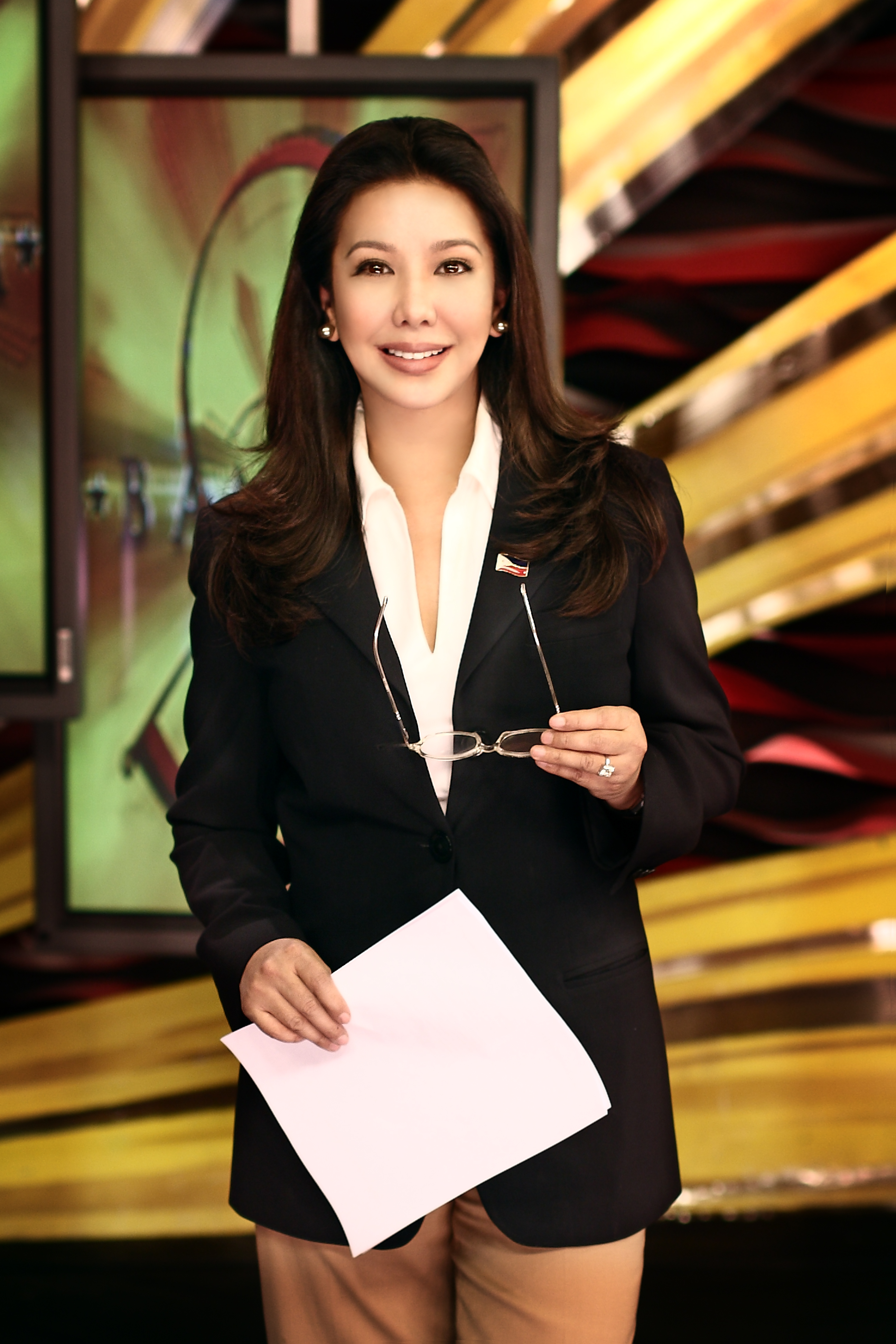
Korina Sanchez

=== Final anchors ===
- Julius Babao (2010–20)
- Karen Davila (2010–20)

=== Former anchors ===
- Boy Abunda (2011–14; Ikaw Na! anchor)
- Ces Drilon (2006–17)
- Henry Omaga-Diaz (2006–10)
- Korina Sanchez (2006–09)
- Tony Velasquez (2014–16; Tatak Noypi anchor)

== International broadcast ==
Bandila aired worldwide (with a roughly one-day delay) on The Filipino Channel (TFC) in Asia Pacific, Australia, Canada, Europe, the Middle East, and the United States.

In Australia, SBS first aired the program with a delayed telecast on the following day at 6:50 AM from Tuesdays to Saturdays, replacing PTV's Teledyaryo as the Filipino news service on World Watch. It was later moved to an 8:05 AM timeslot from Tuesday to Saturday with replays at 2:30 PM on SBS Viceland, while TV Patrol Weekend is aired every Sunday and Monday. It was replaced by TV Patrol when the newscast's production was suspended due to the enhanced community quarantine implemented to manage the COVID-19 pandemic in the Philippines and its eventual cancellation.

== Accolades ==
Bandila's coverage of the Subic rape case earned the news program a nomination for the Philippines in the International Emmy Awards spearheaded by the International Academy of Television Arts and Sciences.

- Henry Omaga Diaz was awarded as one of the Ten Outstanding Media Personalities by International Media Associates Inc. (IMAI) on November 29, 2006.
- Korina Sanchez was also among the Most Well-Liked Female Personalities in the Anak TV Seal Awards 2006. In 2007, she was recognized in the same category but became number one among ten most well-liked female TV Personalities.
- Bandila earned its first-ever nomination for an International Emmy Award for their report "The Subic Rape Case Promulgation". It was the first time that an entry from the Philippines became a finalist on the award-giving body. It became one of the four nominees in the News category out of the eight semi-finalists. Incidentally, TV Patrol, the network's primetime news program, was also chosen as one of the eight semi-finalists for the news category.
- Bandila received a Golden Dove Award for Best News Program during the 16th KBP Golden Dove Awards. Kapisanan ng mga Brodkaster ng Pilipinas was established by broadcast media practitioners to regulate the industry and elevate standards, promote social change, help disseminate government information, strengthen trade ties with the advertising industry, and promote public welfare.
- In 2007, Bandila won the Best News Program category in the 21st PMPC Star Awards for Television.
- Bandila was hailed as the Best News Program during the 2007 Asian Television Awards, featuring their news coverage of the Subic Rape Case Promulgation.
- Bandila was awarded again with a Golden Dove Award for Best News Program during the 19th KBP (Kapisanan ng mga Brodkaster ng Pilipinas) Golden Dove Awards in November 2010.
- Henry Omaga-Diaz was awarded a Golden Dove Award as the "Best TV newscaster" during the 19th KBP Golden Dove Awards in November 2010.
- Bandila won the categories for Best News Program and Best Male News Program Anchors (Julius Babao) at the 10th Gawad Tanglaw Awards (2012).
