= Rapp Brush =

United States Army general

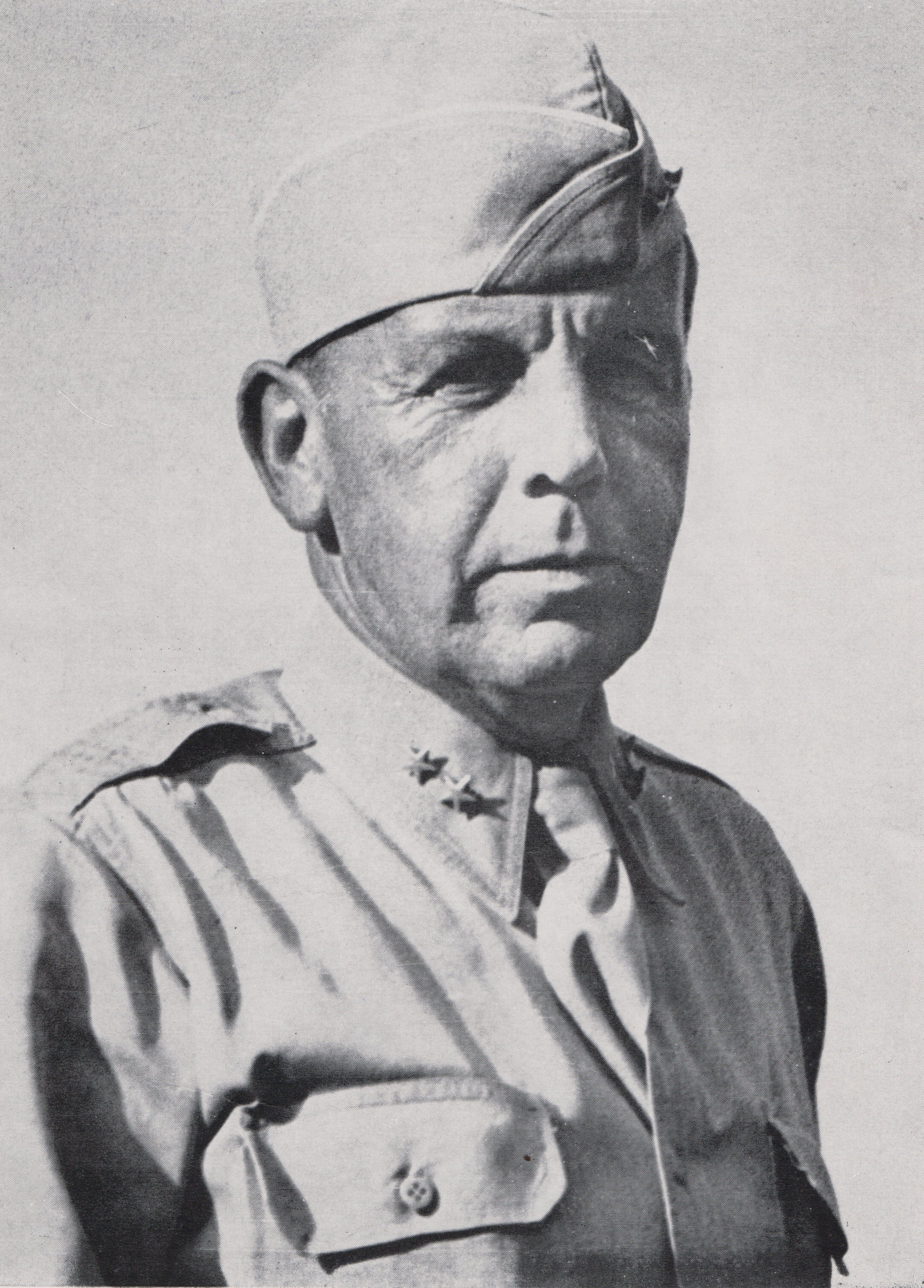
- Major General Rapp Brush
- Born: November 7, 1889; Fort D.A. Russell, Wyoming, US
- Died: March 6, 1958 (aged 68); San Francisco, California, US
- Burial place: San Francisco National Cemetery
- Relatives: BG Daniel H. Brush Jr. (father); Isaac Rapp (uncle); BG Clarence Deems Jr. (brother-in-law)
- Military career
- Allegiance: United States
- Branch: United States Army
- Service years: 1911–1945
- Rank: Major General
- Nickname: "Dash"
- Service number: O-3031
- Unit: Infantry Branch
- Commands: 40th Infantry Division; 22nd Infantry Brigade; 21st Infantry Regiment
- Conflicts: Philippine–American War; Moro Rebellion; Battle of Bud Bagsak; Border War; Pancho Villa Expedition; World War I; World War II; Attack on Pearl Harbor; New Guinea campaign; Philippine campaign; Battle of Luzon; Battle of Visayas; Liberation of Panay
- Awards: Army Distinguished Service Medal; Silver Star; Legion of Merit; Bronze Star Medal; Air Medal

Isaac Rapp Brush (November 7, 1889 – March 6, 1958) was a decorated officer in United States Army with the rank of Major General. Brush commanded the 40th Infantry Division from 1942 to 1945 during its World War II involvement in the United States armed forces' liberation of the Philippines.

== Early career ==
Isaac Rapp Brush was born on November 7, 1889, at Fort D.A. Russell, Wyoming as the son of Brigadier general Daniel H. Brush Jr. and Harriet Rapp. His family had wide military background while his father was a career Army officer and veteran of Civil War, Indian conflicts and also served in the Philippines during Spanish-American War. His paternal grandfather was a Union Army officer Daniel H. Brush Sr., who was brevetted Brigadier General, U.S. Volunteers on March 13, 1865, for "gallant and meritorious services at the Battles of Fort Donelson and Shiloh" during American Civil War. A maternal grandfather, Isaac Rapp was also a Civil war veteran who served for Union as Second Lieutenant with Company "D", 81st Illinois Infantry. His maternal uncle was his namesake Isaac Rapp, an architect who has been called the "Creator of the Santa Fe style." Brush's sister Harriet married late Brigadier general Clarence Deems Jr.

Young Rapp grew up on the stations over the United States as his father changed assignments during his career, including the Philippines in the early 1900s, where his father was a Military District Commander of Lingayen Gulf. He returned to the United States and graduated from the Phillips Exeter Academy in Exeter, New Hampshire, in summer 1908. Brush then entered the University of Illinois in Chicago, but left the college after he successfully passed the Officers' military examinations at Fort Leavenworth in February 1911.

He was commissioned second lieutenant of Infantry on February 11, 1911, and ordered to Fort Sheridan for basic training. Brush completed the training few months later and embarked for the Philippines, where he joined Company "K", 8th Infantry Regiment at Pettit Barracks, Mindanao. He remained in that assignment for three years and took part in the Battle of Bud Bagsak under General John J. Pershing against Moro rebels on June 11–15, 1913.

Following the return stateside in early January 1915, Brush joined the Company "H", 11th Infantry Regiment at Texas City, Texas. After three months with that outfit, he was transferred to the Company "C", 26th Infantry Regiment and took part in the patrols along the Mexican border during Pancho Villa Expedition.

In July 1915, Brush was transferred to the United States Disciplinary Barracks at Fort Leavenworth, Kansas, and joined First Company of local Guard Battalion. He was promoted to first lieutenant in July 1916 and assumed duty as Adjutant of 1st Disciplinary Battalion at Fort Leavenworth under Major Dwight W. Ryther.

Upon the American entry into World War I in April 1917, Brush was promoted to captain in May 1917 and assumed duty as Barracks Adjutant, United States Disciplinary Barracks at Fort Leavenworth. He was promoted to the temporary rank of Major in June 1918 and joined the 53rd Infantry Regiment at Camp Forrest, Georgia. Brush participated in the training of new recruits and formation of new units at Camps Pike and Wadsworth, South Carolina, and did not deploy overseas during World War I.

== Interwar period ==
Following the Armistice, Brush was transferred to the War Department General Staff in Washington, D.C., and joined the Publication Division of the Adjutant General's Department. He served there for two years and his rank of Major was made permanent during that time.

He was transferred to the Training Center of Ninth Corps Area at Presidio of San Francisco, California, in October 1920 and served as Post Adjutant under Brigadier general Chase W. Kennedy until his departure for the instruction at the Army Command and General Staff School at Fort Leavenworth, Kansas, in August 1922. Brush graduated as Distinguished Graduate in June 1923 and returned to the Presidio of San Francisco for duty as an Instructor, Organized Reserves, Ninth Corps Area.

In September 1925, Brush was ordered to the Army War College in Washington, D.C., and upon graduation following June, he assumed duty as Commanding Officer, 2nd Battalion, 13th Infantry Regiment at Fort Devens, Massachusetts. He was later transferred to the Fort Strong, Massachusetts and served as Commanding Officer, 1st Battalion his regiment until August 1927, when returned to Washington, D.C.

Brush was subsequently assigned to the Office of the Assistant Chief of Staff for Operations (G-3) and served consecutively under Brigadier generals Frank Parker and Edward L. King until May 1931, when he was transferred to Vancouver Barracks, Washington for duty with 7th Infantry Regiment. While in this capacity, he served again under Colonel Dwight W. Ryther, a decorated veteran of Spanish-American War whom he met during World War I and also with Charles H. Corlett future general officer in the Pacific War.

One year later, Brush assumed command of the 1st Battalion of his regiment and following establishing of the Civilian Conservation Corps (CCC), a voluntary government work relief program for unemployed, unmarried men, in early 1933, he was given additional duty as Commanding officer, Baker District, CCC in Baker, Oregon. Brush later served as an Executive Officer, CCC District at Vancouver Barracks under Brigadier general James K. Parsons until the end of 1934.

In January 1935, Brush was ordered back to Washington, D.C., where he joined the Office of Chief of Infantry under Major general George A. Lynch. He was assigned to the Detachment of Enlisted Men under lieutenant colonel Oscar Griswold, another future general and his superior in the Pacific War and upon departure of Grisswold in March 1937, Brush replaced him as Chief of the Detachment. He was meanwhile promoted to lieutenant colonel himself on August 1, 1935.

Following the opening of Golden Gate International Exposition in San Francisco in February 1939, Brush was appointed Liaison Officer with that Exposition, being stationed at the headquarters of Ninth Corps Area at Presidio of San Francisco, California. He served in this capacity until September 1939, when he assumed duty as an Executive Officer, 30th Infantry Regiment at Presidio. Brush served under then-Colonel Robert L. Eichelberger and took part in a series of major training exercises with Fourth Army.

Upon his promotion to Colonel, Brush was ordered to Hawaii in July 1940 and assumed command of 21st Infantry Regiment at Schofield Barracks. He was promoted to the temporary rank of Brigadier general in April 1941 and moved to Fort Shafter, Hawaii, for command of 22nd Infantry Brigade, a part of the Hawaiian Division under Major general Maxwell Murray.

The Hawaiian Division's assets were reorganized to form division under the new Triangular Division TO&E. Its brigade headquarters were disbanded and the 27th and 35th Infantry Regiments were assigned to the new 25th Infantry Division. Maxwell remained in command while Brush was promoted to the capacity of his Assistant Division Commander by the beginning of October 1941.

== World War II ==
=== Early years ===
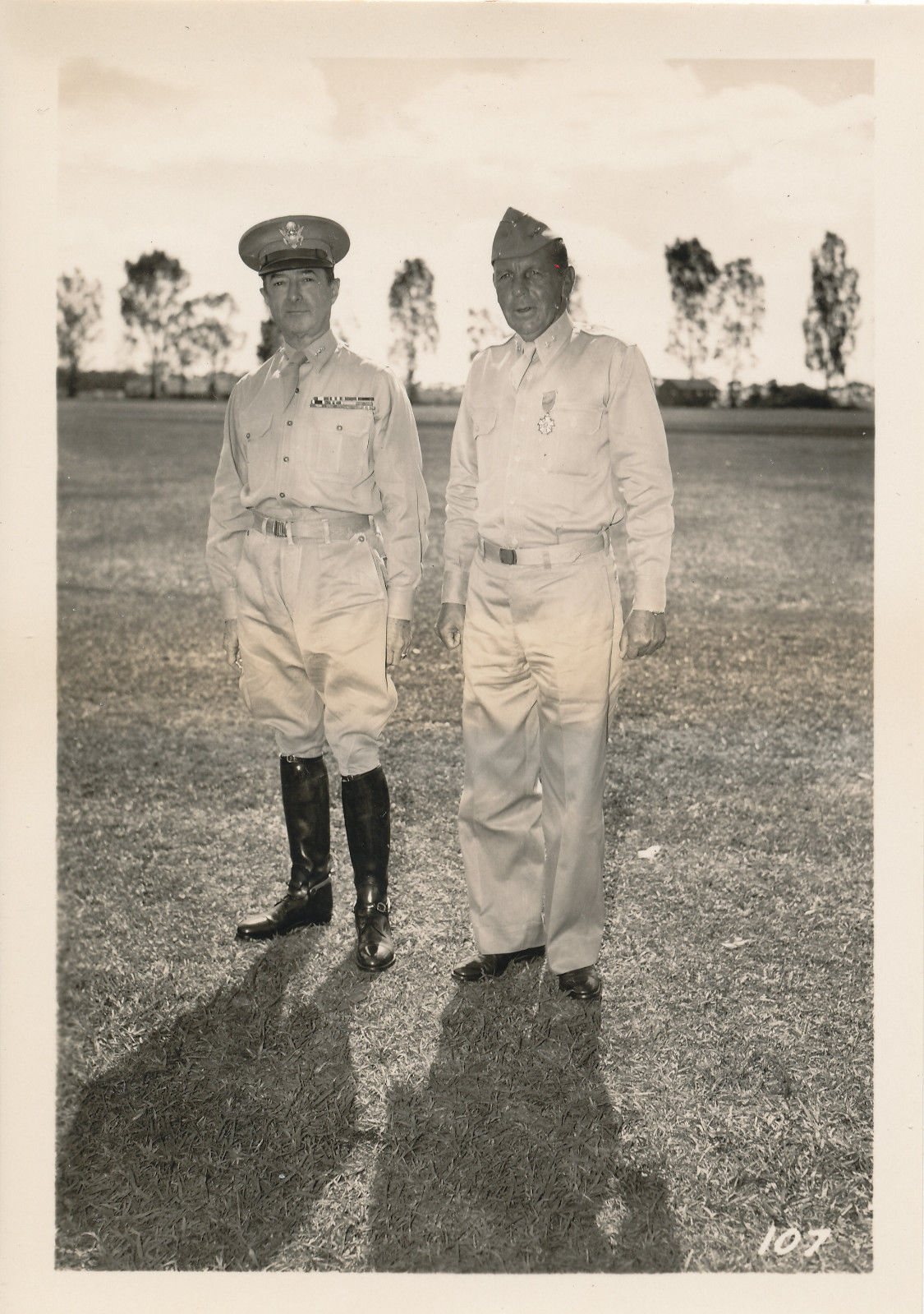
Brush after he was decorated with Legion of Merit for the training of 40th Infantry Division while in Hawaii in late 1943. On the left is Commander of the Hawaiian Department, lieutenant general Robert C. Richardson.

Brush was stationed at Schofield Barracks at the time of the Japanese air attack on 7 December 1941, which brought the United States into World War II, and began organizing the 25th Infantry Division for moving to beach positions for the defense of Honolulu and Ewa Point. He then participated in the intensive training of the division's personnel, most of whom were from the Hawaii National Guard, until April 1942, when he was ordered to the continental states.

On May 20, Brush was promoted to the rank of major general and assumed duty as Commanding general, 40th Infantry Division with additional responsibility as Commanding General, San Pedro Sub Sector (defense of Los Angeles Metropolitan Area against possible Japanese attack). While in this capacity, his division consisted of California, Nevada Army National Guard, and Utah Army National Guards.

Brush was tasked with the transformation of the Division into combat effective force and after several months of intensive training in California, he departed with his division to Hawaii in September 1942. The 40th Division was tasked with the defense of outer islands of Hawaii while Brush assumed additional duty as Commanding general, Kauai District. The training continued as defensive positions were improved and maintained and Brush supervised division's intensive amphibious and jungle training in late 1943.

The 40th Division moved to the staging area on Guadalcanal in late December 1943 and then arrived to New Britain in April 1944. The Division took positions at Talasea on the northern side of the island, at Arawe on the southern side and conducted jungle patrols during which met only occasional resistance. However no major battle was fought and heavy rain and mud were constant problems for divisional personnel. For his service during the training of the 40th Division, Brush received Legion of Merit.

=== Philippines ===
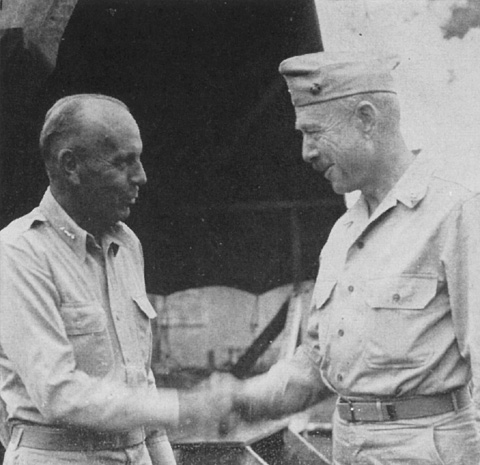
Brush (left) is welcomed by commanding general, 1st Marine Division, Major General William H. Rupertus as 40th Infantry Division arrives on Cape Gloucester, New Britain in April 1944.

Brush and his division departed for Luzon, Philippines in late December 1944 and made an assault landing at Lingayen, Luzon on January 9, 1945, as the part of XIV Corps under his old friend, now-Major general Oscar Griswold. Brush and his command seized Lingayen airfield, and then occupied Bolinao Peninsula and San Miguel, before advanced toward Manila.

After several weeks of fighting, Brush and his division captured the Clark Field, a former Army Air Corps base now used by Japanese Army for training of Kamikaze pilots. He then led his command into the mainland of Luzon, running into heavy fighting in the Fort Stotsenburg area and the Bamban Hills, before captured the Snake Hill and Storm King Mountain in February 1945. Griswold then invited General Walter Krueger, Commander of Sixth Army to a ceremony marking the capture of Fort Stotsenburg, a former noted U.S. Army base. Unfortunately Krueger who did not like National Guard units, was not satisfied with division's performance and doubted about its qualities. Griswold who knew Brush from their common service in the Office of the Chief of Infantry back in 1935-1936 defended his old friend and his outfit. Krueger demanded the relief of Brush, but Griswold declined to do so. The relationship between Krueger and Brush became tense.

In order to capture the Visayas Islands, an Island group in the Central Philippines, the islands of Panay and Negros were supposed to be captured first. Brush landed with his division on March 18, 1945, and after two days in the mountainous terrain, they successfully captured the island of Panay. The landing on Negros was commenced on March 29 and the 40th Division capture the city of Bacolod the following day. The capture of Talisay by Brush's division followed on April 2, and then all three regiments of the 40th Division pushed east into the rugged, mountainous interior of the island. The Japanese resisted stubbornly, aided by booby-trapped terrain, defended their fortified positions by day, and conducted harassing attacks at night. Soon, the 40th Division started using small infiltrating units to creep past tank traps and minefields, then scrambled uphill across open fields of fire to attack Japanese positions.

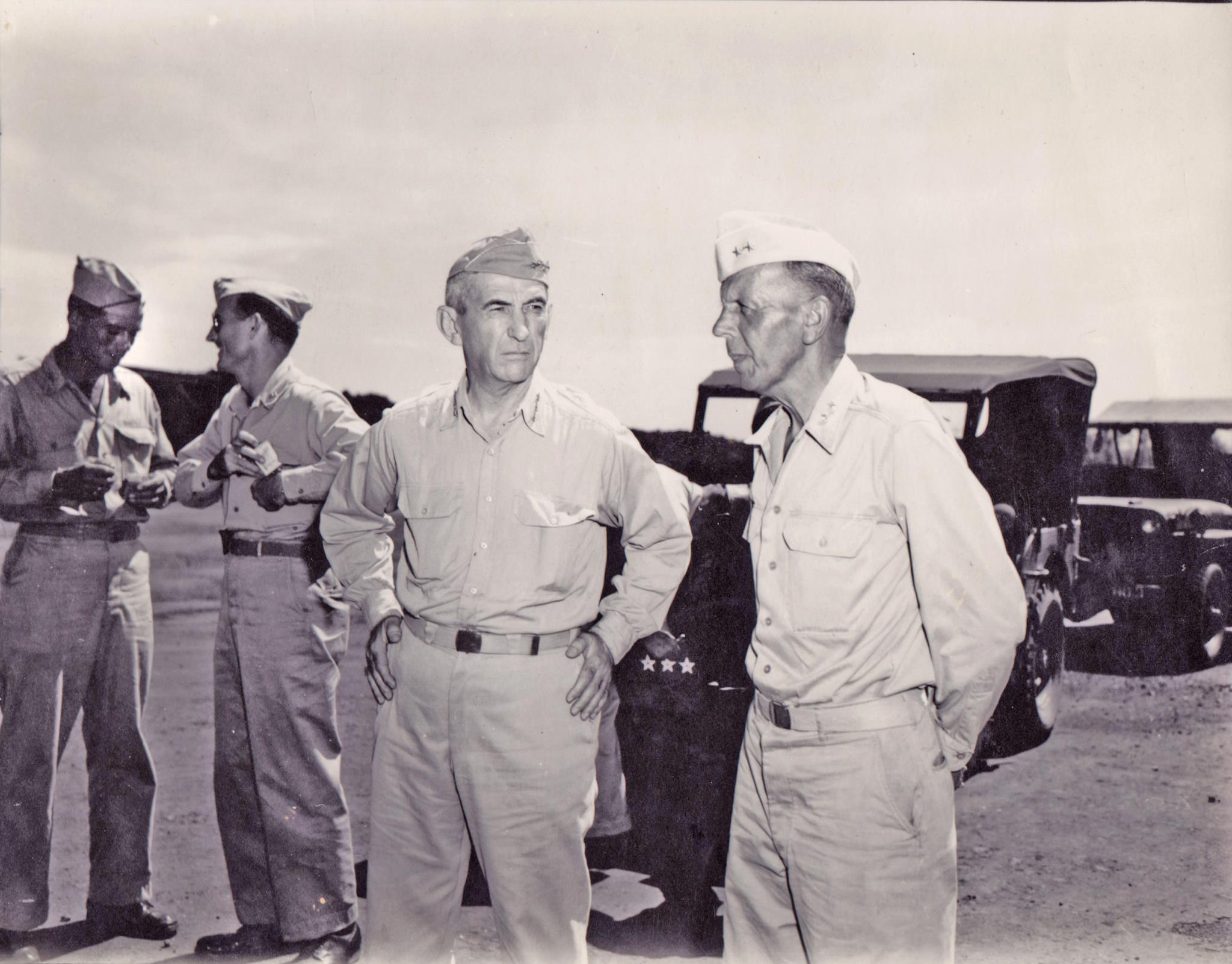
Brush (right) with Commander, Sixth Army, lieutenant general Walter Krueger at the airport in the Philippines in early 1945.

The capture of Negros Island was completed on June 2, 1945, and Lieutenant General Robert L. Eichelberger, commander of the Eighth Army, praised Brush and his division, decorating him with the Silver Star for bravery. Brush's division then continued in the operations against the Japanese Army on Cebu and Bohol and enemy suffered 14,300 killed and 1,230 wounded in contrast to 835 killed and 1,905 wounded on Allied side.

The Fortieth Division then returned under command of Sixth Army of Lieutenant General Walter Krueger and was assigned to Charles P. Hall's XI Corps in July 1945. Krueger didn't stop in his efforts to relieve Brush and demanded his relief, but Hall also protested and declined Krueger's proposal. Brush finally asked to be relieved of command, which was approved and he departed for the United States. In addition to the Silver Star, Brush also received the Army Distinguished Service Medal, Bronze Star, Air Medal and was decorated with Philippine Legion of Honor. The citation for his Army DSM reads:

The President of the United States of America, authorized by Act of Congress July 9, 1918, takes pleasure in presenting the Army Distinguished Service Medal to Major General Rapp Brush (ASN: 0-3031), United States Army, for exceptionally meritorious and distinguished services to the Government of the United States, in a duty of great responsibility during the period from April 1944 to June 1945. The singularly distinctive accomplishments of General Brush reflect the highest credit upon himself and the United States Army.

Brush received some revenge on Krueger after his arrival to the United States, when he visited Chief of the General Staff, General George C. Marshall and reported all his experiences with Krueger during a long meeting. He retired after 34 years of commissioned service on December 31, 1945.

== Retirement ==
After retirement from the Army, Brush settled in Menlo Park, California, and became the President of the Society of the 40th Infantry Division. He died on March 6, 1958, aged 68, in San Francisco, California. General Brush is buried at the San Francisco National Cemetery beside his wife Alice Josephine Hall Brush. They have a one son Isaac Rapp Brush Jr. who served in the United States Army and retired as Major.

== Decorations ==
Here is the list of Brush's decorations with ribbon bar:

| 1st Row | Army Distinguished Service Medal | Silver Star | | Legion of Merit |
| 2nd Row | Bronze Star Medal | Air Medal | Philippine Campaign Medal | Mexican Service Medal |
| 3rd Row | World War I Victory Medal | American Defense Service Medal | American Campaign Medal | Asiatic–Pacific Campaign Medal with four 3/16 inch service stars |
| 4th Row | World War II Victory Medal | Norwegian Order of St. Olav, Commander | Philippine Legion of Honor, Commander | Philippine Liberation Medal with two stars |
Presidential Unit Citation

Military offices
| Preceded by Ernest J. Dawley | Commanding General, 40th Infantry Division; 1942–1945 | Succeeded by Donald J. Myers |
