= Veronica Pedrosa =

Filipino journalist

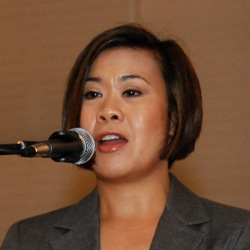
- Pedrosa in 2008
- Born: Philippines
- Education: St Paul's Girls' School
- Alma mater: Cambridge University
- Occupation: Journalist
- Parent: Carmen Pedrosa

Veronica Pedrosa is a Filipino independent broadcast journalist, news presenter and moderator, based in London.

== Career ==
Pedrosa began her career, in 1995, as a news anchor with CNN International and then with BBC World. She has also been a journalist with ABS-CBN News and Current Affairs.

=== Al Jazeera English ===
Pedrosa was with Al Jazeera English in the run-up to its launch, and worked for the channel for six years full-time, from 2005 to 2011, and then as a freelance for a few years more. During that time she was based in the Asia-Pacific bureau, in Kuala Lumpur; at the main bureau, in Doha; and as a correspondent in the field, based primarily in Bangkok:

==== Kuala Lumpur ====
Pedrosa was the lead news presenter at the Kuala Lumpur bureau throughout its life as a broadcast centre, from 2005 in the run-up to the station's launch, to the closure of the Malaysian broadcast centre, in 2010.

Doha

In 2013, she took a break from her work as a field journalist in the Far East to work as a relief news-anchor in Doha. Based at the main broadcast centre in Qatar, she presented news-bulletins on the flagship programme Newshour, but also appeared as the host of studio-based discussion programmes, such as the daily programme Inside Story, and the more specialist weekly, Inside Syria. She also hosted, from Indonesia, an edition of the extended-interview strand Talk to Al Jazeera.

Bangkok

In addition to her studio-work, Pedrosa was a respected field-correspondent for Al Jazeera English. As the Bangkok correspondent, she filed stories from Thailand and throughout the South-East Asia region. In November 2013, she returned to her homeland of the Philippines, to cover the aftermath of the super-typhoon.

== Awards ==
In 2004, Pedrosa was named Best News Anchor at the Asian Television Awards.
