= All Headline News =

AHN
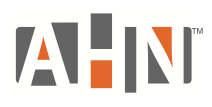
- Type: Private
- Industry: News media, News agency, Web syndication, Internet
- Founded: 2000
- Defunct: 2010
- Headquarters: United States
- Products: Wire service
- Website: www.allheadlinenews.com

All Headline News (AHN) was a United States–based news agency or wire service. It was founded in 2000 by W. Jeffrey Brown as an internet news search engine. It grew to become a major worldwide online newswire service, providing news and other content, to websites, digital signage, and other publishers who paid a fee for the service.

The company's daily news coverage included international headline news, business, entertainment, celebrity gossip, sports, technology, health and politics. The company also provides a variety of non-editorial content services such as weather, horoscopes, trivia and business data.

AHN's primary focus was breaking headline news and a small investigative news effort.

== Organization ==
AHN covered international and national news using a network of journalists, writers, contributors and freelance "stringers" from the US, Europe, Asia, and Africa.

AHN editors were located in various cities in the United States and abroad and managed electronic news-gathering operations using a proprietary news content management system called NewsBahn.

At its peak, AHN produced over 100,000 news articles a year.

== History ==
- 2000: AHN is founded as an internet news search engine.
- 2003: Company begins offering news and content for syndication to websites.
- 2004: AHN acquires WeatherClicks. Integrates weather into syndication services.
- 2005: AHN starts producing and distributing original news with the purpose of syndicating news.
- 2007: Launches sports, celebrity and entertainment news divisions.
- 2010: Ceases operations.

== Controversy ==
In January 2008, AHN was sued by much larger competitor Associated Press, claiming that AHN allegedly infringed on its copyrights and its hot news, a contentious 'quasi-property' right to facts. The AP complaint alleged that AHN reporters had copied facts from AP news reports without paying a syndication fee. After AHN moved to dismiss all but the copyright claims set forth by AP, the suit was dismissed. According to court records, the case was dismissed pre-trial.
