= Talipao =

Municipality in Sulu, Philippines

Talipao تاليڤااو
- Municipality
- Municipality of Talipao
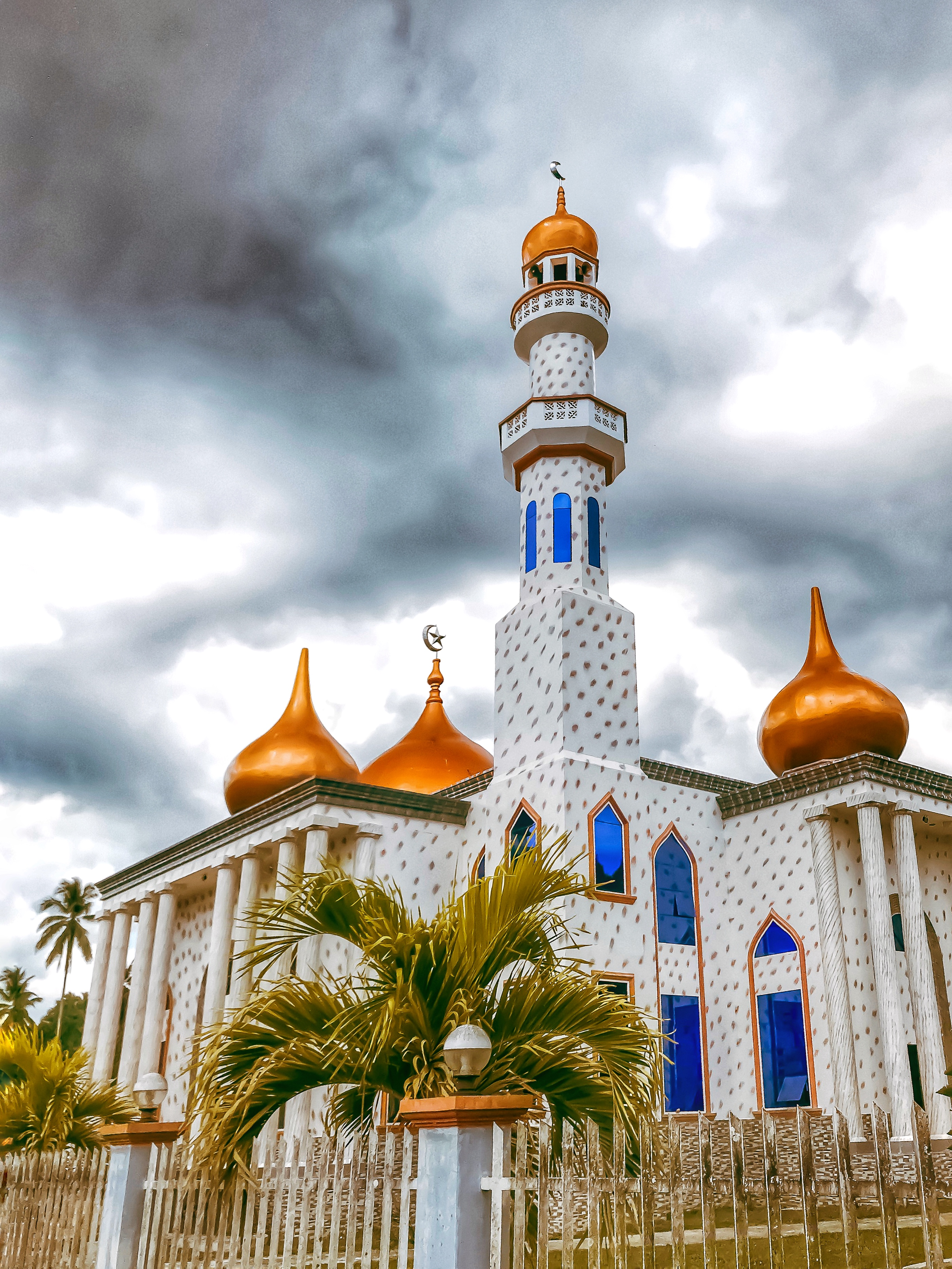
- The Hadja Sitti Raya Mosque

- Seal

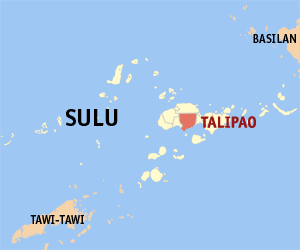
- Map of Sulu with Talipao highlighted
- Interactive map of Talipao
- Location within the Philippines
- Coordinates: 5°58′34″N 121°06′31″E
- Country: Philippines
- Region: Zamboanga Peninsula
- Province: Sulu
- District: 1st district
- Barangays: 52 (see Barangays)

Government
  - Type: Sangguniang Bayan
  - Mayor: Nivocadnezar I. Tulawie
  - Vice Mayor: Zulficar T. Tulawie
  - Representative: Samier A. Tan
  - Municipal Council: Members: Sherie Mae T. Sakandal; Javier A. Abdulla; Maryjoy P. Hadjirol; Mijan J. Hasim; Nuruddin P. Adjuraini; Abdel-Arrauf L. Sahimarri; Pulong M. Alian; Julbakar M. Jamhari
  - Electorate: 33,021 voters (2025)

Area
  - Total: 380.57 km^{2} (146.94 sq mi)
- Elevation: 157 m (515 ft)
- Highest elevation: 506 m (1,660 ft)
- Lowest elevation: 0 m (0 ft)

Population (2024 census)
  - Total: 107,901
  - Density: 283.52/km^{2} (734.33/sq mi)
  - Households: 15,853

Economy
  - Income class: 1st municipal income class
  - Poverty incidence: 27.86% (2023)
  - Revenue: ₱ 394.5 million (2022)
  - Assets: ₱ 499.3 million (2022)
  - Expenditure: ₱ 304.3 million (2022)
  - Liabilities: ₱ 54.16 million (2022)

Service provider
  - Electricity: Sulu Electric Cooperative (SULECO)
- Time zone: UTC+8 (PST)
- ZIP code: 7403
- PSGC: 1906613000
- IDD : area code: +63 (0)68
- Native languages: Tausug; Tagalog
- Website: www.talipao.gov.ph

Talipao, officially the Municipality of Talipao (Tausūg: Kawman sin Talipao; Tagalog: Bayan ng Talipao), is a municipality in the province of Sulu, Philippines. According to the 2024 census, it has a population of 107,901 people.

== Etymology ==
The municipality of Talipao is named after a certain husband and wife, “Tal” and “Pao”, respectively.

== History ==
From the district of Jolo, it was transformed into a full-pledged municipality on July 1, 1957, under the provision of the Department of Mindanao and Sulu Administrative Code. On March 7, 1984, Talipao was renamed as Arolas Tulawie by virtue of Batas Pambansa Blg. 692 but was rejected in a plebiscite.

== Geography ==
The Municipality of Talipao's total area is approximately 497.32 square kilometres or 49,732 hectares. This constitutes more or less 20.63% of Sulu's total land area. It is bounded on the north by the municipality of Patikul; on the south by Sulu Sea; on the east by the municipality of Panglima Estino; and by the municipality of Maimbung on its west side.

The municipality of Talipao lies right in the mid portion of Jolo island with its Barangay Poblacion basically situated in the innermost central part of the municipality. From the capital town of Jolo, Talipao is connected with concrete-type national road which is approximately 22.8 kilometres (14.2 mi) away from the Sulu Provincial Capitol Complex.

=== Barangays ===
Talipao is politically subdivided into 52 barangays. Each barangay consists of puroks while some have sitios.

- Andalan
- Bagsak
- Bandang
- Bilaan (Poblacion)
- Bud Bunga
- Buntod
- Buroh
- Dalih
- Gata
- Kabatuhan Bilaan
- Kabatuhan Tiis
- Kabungkol
- Kagay
- Kahawa
- Kandaga
- Kanlibot
- Kiutaan
- Kuhaw
- Kulamboh
- Kuttong
- Lagtoh
- Lambanah
- Liban
- Liu-Bud Pantao
- Lower Binuang
- Lower Kamuntayan
- Lower Laus
- Lower Sinumaan
- Lower Talipao
- Lumbayao
- Lumping Pigih Daho
- Lungkiaban
- Mabahay
- Mahala
- Mampallam
- Marsada
- Mauboh
- Mungit-mungit
- Niog-Sangahan
- Pantao
- Samak
- Talipao Proper
- Tampakan
- Tiis
- Tinggah
- Tubod
- Tuyang
- Upper Binuang
- Upper Kamuntayan
- Upper Laus
- Upper Sinumaan
- Upper Talipao

=== Climate ===
Climate data for Talipao, Sulu
| Month | Jan | Feb | Mar | Apr | May | Jun | Jul | Aug | Sep | Oct | Nov | Dec | Year |
|---|---|---|---|---|---|---|---|---|---|---|---|---|---|
| Mean daily maximum °C (°F) | 27 (81) | 27 (81) | 27 (81) | 28 (82) | 28 (82) | 28 (82) | 28 (82) | 28 (82) | 28 (82) | 28 (82) | 28 (82) | 27 (81) | 28 (82) |
| Mean daily minimum °C (°F) | 26 (79) | 26 (79) | 26 (79) | 27 (81) | 27 (81) | 27 (81) | 27 (81) | 27 (81) | 27 (81) | 27 (81) | 27 (81) | 27 (81) | 27 (81) |
| Average precipitation mm (inches) | 170 (6.7) | 130 (5.1) | 125 (4.9) | 122 (4.8) | 229 (9.0) | 286 (11.3) | 254 (10.0) | 248 (9.8) | 182 (7.2) | 257 (10.1) | 233 (9.2) | 188 (7.4) | 2,424 (95.5) |
| Average rainy days | 18.3 | 15.3 | 15.2 | 14.6 | 22.8 | 24.0 | 24.3 | 23.3 | 20.5 | 22.6 | 21.9 | 19.3 | 242.1 |
Source: Meteoblue

== Demographics ==
Population census of Talipao
| Year | Pop. | ±% p.a. |
|---|---|---|
| 1918 | 5,871 | — |
| 1939 | 11,064 | +3.06% |
| 1948 | 8,650 | −2.70% |
| 1960 | 18,553 | +6.56% |
| 1970 | 32,111 | +5.63% |
| 1975 | 15,612 | −13.47% |
| 1980 | 25,853 | +10.61% |
| 1990 | 66,261 | +9.87% |
| 1995 | 66,568 | +0.09% |
| 2000 | 73,015 | +2.00% |
| 2007 | 85,920 | +2.27% |
| 2010 | 75,173 | −4.75% |
| 2015 | 80,255 | +1.25% |
| 2020 | 100,088 | +4.76% |
| 2024 | 107,901 | +1.82% |
Source: Philippine Statistics Authority

== Economy ==
Poverty Incidence of Talipao

Source: Philippine Statistics Authority
