= Bong Lapira =

Filipino journalist (1940–2017)

- Born: Faustino L. Lapira; 1940; Carcar, Cebu
- Died: June 8, 2017 (aged 77)
- Occupation: Broadcaster
- Years active: 1962–2008

Faustino "Bong" L. Lapira (1940 – June 8, 2017) was a pioneering Filipino broadcast journalist, news anchor, and radio personality. He was one of the most prominent figures in Philippine television news during the 1960s and 1970s, known for his authoritative delivery, polished diction, and gravitas.

Dubbed the "Walter Cronkite of the East" for his resonant voice and journalistic integrity, Lapira's career spanned nearly five decades, encompassing radio, television, and documentary production. He retired in 2008 and is remembered as an institution in Philippine broadcasting.

== Biography ==
=== Early life and radio career (1940-1962) ===
Faustino L. Lapira was born in 1940 in Carcar, Cebu. He hailed from a family with roots in Cebu, and his early years were spent in the Visayas region. Lapira began his career in broadcasting as a radio disc jockey in the late 1950s and early 1960s, working at stations such as DYXL-FM, DYST-FM in Tagbilaran, Bohol; DYWC Radyo Bandilyo in Dumaguete, Negros Oriental; and Bisdak Radio in Larena, Siquijor, where he was known by the on-air moniker "Dr. Bill." In 1961, he hosted the ''DYRC Amateur Hour'' before relocating to Manila to pursue opportunities in national media. He also hosted ''Maayong Buntag Sugbo'' in 1963, a morning program that showcased his early talent for engaging audiences.

=== The Big News (1962-1967) ===
Lapira entered television in 1962 as one of the original anchors of The Big News, the flagship evening newscast on ABC-5 (now known as TV5), replacing earlier anchor Ernie Zarate. He co-anchored the program with Duds Rivera from 1962 until 1967. The Big News was a groundbreaking half-hour newscast that dominated Philippine television, winning the Citizen's Awards for Television (CAT Award) for Best News Program from 1964 to 1967. Lapira's polished style and commanding presence made him a household name during this period. But in early 1967, he transferred to ABS-CBN along with colleague Marita Manuel, marking the end of his tenure on The Big News. He was replaced by Jose Mari Velez, who anchored the program from 1967 to 1972.

=== Newsbreak, Man on the Moon, Encounter (1967-1969) ===
Upon joining ABS-CBN in 1967, Lapira became a key figure in the network's news division under the leadership of Eugenio "Geny" Lopez Jr. At the age of 27, he anchored Newsbreak, a half-hour evening daily English newscast that premiered in March 1967, at 9:00 p.m. on DZXL-TV Channel 9 with Manuel as the assistant news director and head of news operations. Alongside Henry Halasan of DZAQ-TV's The World Tonight, Lapira served as one of the "twin faces" of ABS-CBN News, contributing to the program's success and innovative coverage from 1967 to 1969. Newsbreak flourished, winning the CAT Award for Best News Program in 1968 and breaking the four-year streak of The Big News.

Lapira was involved in pioneering broadcasts, including a live coverage of the Lapiang Malaya massacre in May 1967, where he worked with cameraman Bert Salonga and reporters Vero Perfecto, Jake Almeda-Lopez, and Philip Pigao to deliver on-the-ground reports. On July 20, 1969, he served as the main commentator for ABS-CBN's historic coverage of the Apollo 11 Moon landing, broadcast in full color via satellite under the coverage name: Man on the Moon. The panel of experts included Salvador Gonzalez, a science professor at De La Salle College; Father Waterbury, a physics professor at Ateneo de Manila University; Philip Thomas from the United States Information Service (USIS); and Dr. Juan Salcedo, chairman of the National Science Development Board. Lapira was assisted by veteran anchor Hal Bowie, and radio reporter Johnny Midnight with special participation of the late night talk show, Two for The Road and its hosts Elvira Manahan and Eddie Mercado.

In November 1969, Lapira produced and hosted Encounter, a special news program during the 1969 Philippine presidential elections, which at that time the network was starting to broadcast Halalan 1969 (the first election coverage of the network to use chroma key). The program was funded by businessman crony Potenciano "Nanoy" Ilusorio but it aired on ABC-5 instead of ABS-CBN. The network management viewed this as an act of disloyalty, leading to his termination. Lapira filed a ₱5 million lawsuit for wrongful dismissal, arguing that his contract did not prohibit appearances on other networks. He later dropped the suit after Encounter won a 1969 CAT Award. Following his departure, Lapira moved to the Manila Broadcasting Company (MBC), while Newsbreak was now anchored by Duds Rivera, the young brother of actress Mila del Sol, until 1972.

=== The MBC Report and News at Seven (1969-late 1970s) ===
At MBC-11, Lapira first anchored Dateline News, then anchored The MBC Report from 1970 to 1972, co-hosting with Art Galindez and columnist Louie Beltran. He also hosted The Bong Lapira Show. He headed the integrated news division during this time. Then, during the martial law years in 1976, Lapira joined GMA-7, where he co-anchored News at Seven with Tina Monzon-Palma and weatherman Amado Pineda until in the late 70s. He was later replaced by Tony Zorrilla.

=== EDSA Revolution, Post-EDSA era (1986-2003) ===
During the 1986 People Power Revolution, Lapira was a chosen anchor for the New Channel 4 coverage on the final day, broadcasting the departure of President Ferdinand Marcos from Malacañang Palace. He shared anchoring duties with reporters Tina Monzon-Palma, Jose Mari Velez, June Keithley, Jaime Fabregas, Orly Mercado, and others, providing live updates on the peaceful transition to Corazon Aquino's presidency, including reports on Marcos's helicopter evacuation to Clark Air Base and calls for national unity.

By the late 80s, Lapira became the voiceover for commercials, mostly with PSAs such as Nestlé Philippines' Sa Mata ng Bata series starting from 1989, which contains 15-second public service advertisements cautioning adults that breaking the rules or any unacceptable behavior in the presence of children can be miscontrued as acceptable in the society, mostly if it can take place on public places. Several ads during Lapira's era include: Bawal Tumawid, which focuses on the jaywalking rule; Bus, which accompanies the sign "Give Way to the Elderly" on buses; No Parking, which focuses on illegal parking, Queue, which was about how people cut the queue line despite a signage that says "Pumila Lang Po" (Please fall in line); and Garbage, which focuses on littering as it accompanies the signage "BAWAL MAGTAPON NG BASURA DITO!" (Do Not Throw Garbage Here!). Lapira's only phrase in these commercials were either: "Sa mata ng isang bata, ang isang pagkakamali ay nagiging tama... kapag ito ay ginagawa ng mas matanda." (In the eyes of the children, a mistake becomes right... when it is done by an older person.) or "Kung ano ang ginagawa ng mas matanda, ito ang gagayahin ng mga bata." (What the adults do, the younger ones will imitate.)

In the early 2000s, Lapira interviewed Jesuit priest and media pioneer Father James B. Reuter, SJ, in a documentary titled Once Upon a Time: Bong Lapira with Fr. James Reuter, where he also served as line producer. The interview explored Reuter's impact on Philippine communications, theater arts, and history, including his World War II experiences and media innovations.

To celebrate the 50th anniversary of Philippine television, in 2003, Lapira participated to the ABS-CBN documentary Sa Mata ng Balita: 50 Taong Pamamahayag Sa Telebisyon (the documentary which featured other anchors Henry Halasan, Harry Gasser, Frankie Evangelista, Tina Monzon-Palma, Angelo Castro Jr., Noli de Castro, Loren Legarda, and Korina Sanchez), narrating the segment Prelude to a Dictatorship, which chronicled the lead-up to martial law from 1969 to 1972.

Lapira also returned to ABS-CBN in later years as vice president of news, where he trained young reporters in anchoring, including Cathy Yang.

=== Retirement and death (2008-2017) ===
After a 49-year career, Lapira retired in 2008. He remained a respected figure in Philippine journalism, often cited for his intelligence and professionalism, with contemporaries noting that no modern anchors could match his or the late Jose Mari Velez's style.

Bong Lapira died on June 8, 2017, at the age of 77 from colon cancer. He was buried in Carcar Public Cemetery in Poblacion, Carcar, Cebu.
