= Henry Halasan =

Filipino journalist (1924–2013)

- Born: July 15, 1924
- Died: February 6, 2013 (aged 88)
- Occupation: Broadcaster
- Years active: 1966–2003

Henry Halasan (July 15, 1924 – February 6, 2013) was a Filipino broadcast journalist and news anchor. He served as the anchor of ABS-CBN's English-language newscast The World Tonight from 1966 to 1972, initially co-anchoring with Hal Bowie. Halasan's career spanned the early years of television news in the Philippines.

== Biography ==
=== Early life and sales career (1924–1965) ===
Henry Halasan was born on July 15, 1924. When he was in his early 30s, he began his broadcasting career at the ABS-CBN station in Cebu. He served as station manager there before transferring to the network's main offices in Manila in 1965. Originally assigned as a sales executive, he later moved to on-camera roles in the network's television news department.

=== The World Tonight (1966–1972) ===
In late 1966, Halasan became the co-anchor of The World Tonight, which was launched to compete with The Big News on ABC-5. The program premiered on November 21, 1966, airing weeknights at 8:30 p.m. on Channel 9 (later moving to 10:00 p.m. on Channel 3). It was the first Philippine newscast to broadcast in color. Halasan named the program after the American newscast The World Today. He initially anchored with Hal Bowie, a radio broadcaster. By 1967, Bowie left the program due to health reasons, leaving Halasan as the solo anchor. Halasan also shared anchoring duties with Newsbreak anchor Bong Lapira from 1967 to 1969.

The World Tonight utilized television visuals, including 16mm film footage shot by cameramen such as Bert Salonga, Vic Garcia, Carding Ligon, and Metring Borromeo. Reporters for the program included Tony Lozano, Jun Ricafrente, and Danny Hernandez. Halasan anchored without a teleprompter, reading from scripts. Colleague Tits Tañada noted Halasan's English speaking style, describing it as "natural" and distinct from the overmodulated delivery common among other anchors at the time.

In 1968, Halasan suffered a coughing fit during a live broadcast which caused him to lose his voice. The director froze the video feed for approximately one minute until Halasan recovered. Following the incident, Halasan quit smoking. He continued to anchor The World Tonight until ABS-CBN closed following the declaration of martial law on September 22, 1972. He also served as the network's news director.

=== The World Today (1972–1974) ===
After the closure of ABS-CBN, Halasan joined the Republic Broadcasting System (RBS-7; now GMA-7). He anchored the evening English newscast The World Today from September 25, 1972, to June 28, 1974. The program aired from 7:00 p.m. to 7:30 p.m. His co-anchors included Teddy Begino and Bonoy Gonzaga. At RBS-7, Halasan eventually became the director of the news division.

=== Post-EDSA era (2003) ===
In 2003, Halasan appeared in the ABS-CBN documentary Sa Mata ng Balita: 50 Taong Pamamahayag Sa Telebisyon. He narrated the segment The Birth of Philippine TV, which covered the history of television in the Philippines from 1953 to 1961. The documentary also featured anchors Bong Lapira, Harry Gasser, Frankie Evangelista, Tina Monzon-Palma, Angelo Castro Jr., Noli de Castro, Loren Legarda, and Korina Sanchez.

=== Retirement and death ===
Halasan retired in the mid-2000s and moved to New Jersey in the United States with his family.

Halasan died of cardiac arrest on February 6, 2013, at the age of 88 in New Jersey.
