= Thelma Dumpit-Murillo =

Filipino broadcaster and journalist

Thelma Dumpit-Murillo is a Filipino journalist and broadcaster. She is the eldest daughter of La Union Representative Tomas M. Dumpit.

== Education ==
Dumpit graduated from Maryknoll College (now Miriam College) with a Bachelor of Arts degree major in Mass Communication. She also holds a master's degree in National Security Administration from the National Defense College of the Philippines where she was a scholar and consistent Dean's Lister. She is also a Lopez Jaena fellow from the University of the Philippines College of Mass Communication.

In 2005, she took up the Command and General Staff Course CL46 at the AFP Command and General Staff College successfully completing the prescribed program on March 20, 2006, whose batch included Education Secretary Jesli Lapus. The CGSC is an Executive Leadership Program and in fact, is a prerequisite for promotion for military officials to the rank of General.

== Career ==
Dumpit was in broadcast media for more than 20 years. She started her career as editorial assistant at the government station MBS (now PTV). In 1987, Dumpit moved to Chicago, Illinois, where she anchored The Philippine Reports, a weekly news show broadcast in the Midwest. She resumed her broadcasting career in PTV upon returning to the Philippines in 1992.

In October 1995, Dumpit was hired by the ABC 5 (now TV5) to lead its news team as anchor of Balitang Balita, an early evening newscast and two years later, she became the anchor of the late-night newscast The Big News replacing Tina Monzon-Palma as the lead anchor due to her transfer to ABS-CBN's The World Tonight after Loren Legarda decided to leave the newscast when she ran and won as senator in the 1998 elections. Palma took Legarda's chair. After four years as its senior news anchor, Dumpit negotiated for a change in the terms and conditions of her work status and when her contract was not renewed in October 1999, she sent a letter to Jose Javier, vice president for news and public affairs of ABC, stating that she considered this a constructive dismissal of her services. On December 20, 1999 Dumpit filed a complaint against the company for illegal constructive dismissal and demanded payment for alleged damages. After the initial dismissal of the complaint by the Labor Arbiter, the National Labor Relations Commission (NLRC) reversed the decision and ruled in favor of reinstatement and payment of 2.6 million pesos for back wages. Following the NLRC appeal, ABC filed a petition to the Court of Appeals. The appellate court ruled on January 30, 2004 that NLRC committed a grave abuse of indiscretion and reversed the NLRC's ruling. After almost eight years, on June 8, 2007 the appellate court decision and the subsequent resolution denying the motion for reconsideration were reversed and set aside by a landmark ruling of the Supreme Court of the Philippines. The Supreme Court affirmed NLRC's decision that Dumpit was a regular employee of ABC and that the company's actions constituted illegal dismissal. The decision ruled that Dumpit was to be reinstated to her position as ABC 5 news anchor without lost to seniority and to be awarded almost three million pesos to cover back wages and benefits due a regular employee and for moral damages.

Dumpit has also hosted several radio programs over DZXL, Radio Veritas and DWIZ, contributed news articles to the Philippine Daily Inquirer, Philippine Star and wrote a column for the opinion page of The Manila Times. She continues to be a broadcast correspondent of radio station DWIZ. Just recently, she resumed her column at the Manila Times which appears every Thursday at the op-ed page.

Dumpit served as a Barangay council member from 1997 to 2004. In 2007 she ran but lost in the mayoral election for Rosario, La Union. Dumpit expressed concern over possible election fraud and consequently, filed an electoral protest. She announced on July 11, 2007 that she was looking for a handwriting expert to analyze the ballots in order to determine the true results of the elections. The protest is still pending at Branch 32 of the RTC Agoo, La Union. Currently, she holds the position deputy executive director of CITEM (Center for International Trade Expositions and Missions), an attached agency of the Department of Trade and Industry. She was appointed by President Gloria Macapagal-Arroyo in 2008 for her expertise in communications and marketing and reappointed by President Benigno Aquino III as Director IV of the Department of Trade and Industry, a promotion from her previous rank. Her CESO rank is in process after hurdling a battery of written and oral tests where she passed with flying colors.

== Recognition ==
Dumpit has received a number of awards, including the 1993 Star Award for Best Female Newscaster given by the Philippine Movie Press Club and the award for being one of the Most Distinguished Sons/Daughters of the Province of La Union given by the Provincial Government of La Union.
