= Natalio Ecarma III =

Filipino general (born 1955)

Natalio Cabili Ecarma III
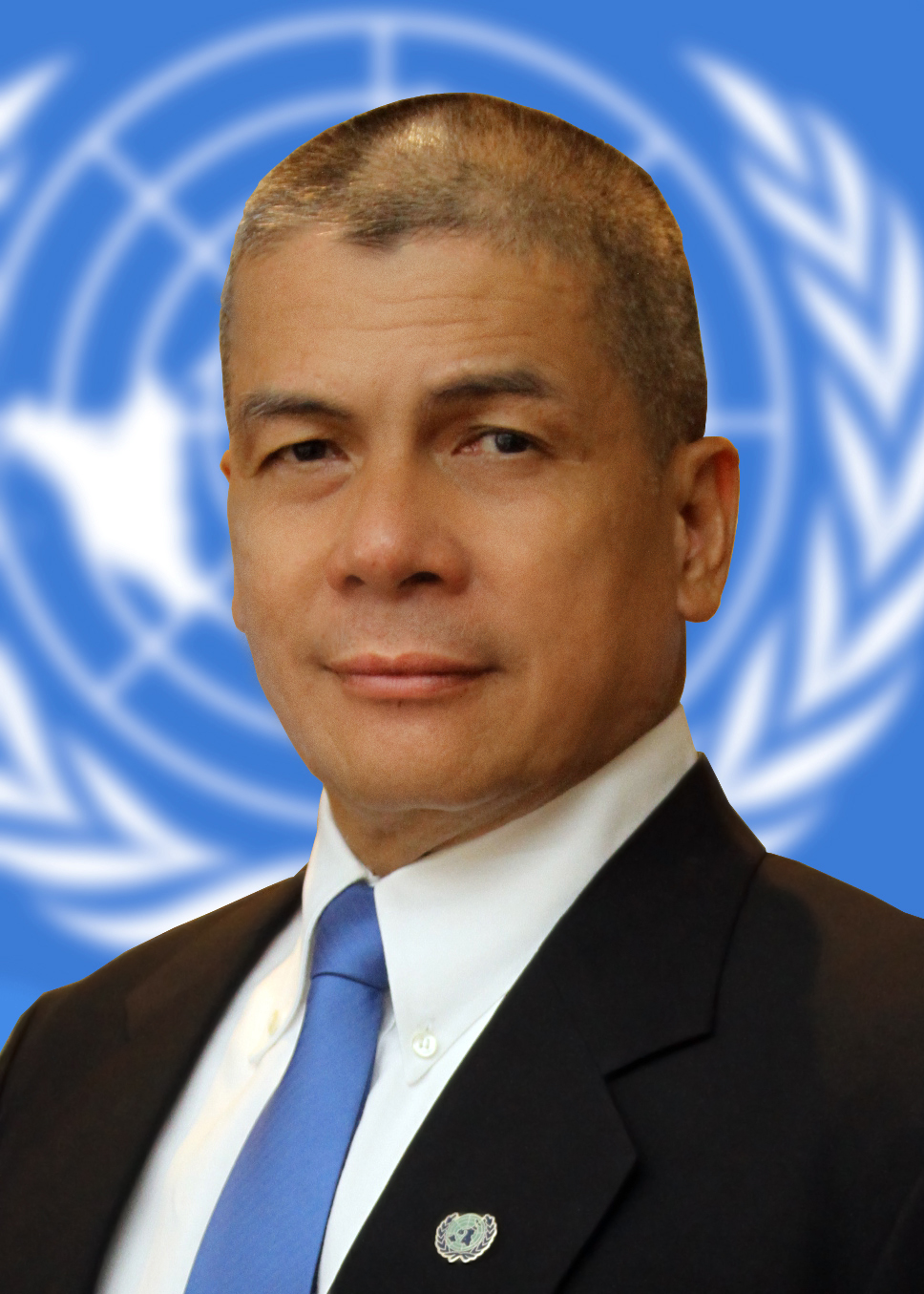

Undersecretary of National Defense for Defense Operations, Department of National Defense (Philippines)
- In office August 2013 – June 30, 2016
- President: Benigno S. Aquino III
- Preceded by: Honorio Azcueta

17th Head of Mission and Force Commander, United Nations Disengagement Observer Force
- In office March 10, 2010 – August 13, 2013
- Preceded by: Wolfgang Jilke (Austria)
- Succeeded by: Iqbal Singha (India)

Deputy Commandant, Philippine Marine Corps
- In office August 16, 2008 – January 2010

Personal details
- Born: Natalio Cabili Ecarma III; June 3, 1955 (age 71) Manila, Philippines
- Spouse(s): Beverly R. Antonio, MD
- Children: Nathan Charles Ecarma, Nathan Christopher Ecarma
- Education: Philippine Military Academy; Marine Corps University; National Defense College of the Philippines; National Sun Yat-sen University
- Profession: Government Official Retired Military Officer
- Awards: Distinguished Service Star; Bronze Cross Medal; Military Merit Medal; Military Commendation Medal; Military Civic Action Medal
- Website: http://www.dnd.gov.ph

Military service
- Allegiance: Republic of the Philippines
- Branch/service: Philippine Marine Corps
- Years of service: 1981 - 2012
- Rank: Major General

Natalio Cabili Ecarma III (born June 3, 1955) is a Filipino General who recently served as Undersecretary of the Department of National Defense of the Republic of the Philippines. He is known for being the first Filipino appointed by UN Secretary-General Ban Ki-moon, to serve as Head of Mission and Force Commander of the United Nations Disengagement Observer Force in the Golan Heights, giving him the distinction of being the first Filipino to head a United Nations Peacekeeping Mission, with the rank of UN Assistant Secretary General.

== Early life and education ==
Ecarma was born on June 3, 1955, to then Lieutenant Rodolfo A. Ecarma and Evelyn Cabili at the University of Santo Tomas Hospital in Manila and is the eldest of five children. He belongs to a distinguished line of military leaders and public servants. His maternal grandfather is the late Senator Tomas Cabili of Iligan who served as Secretary of National Defense under President Sergio Osmeña. A hero of the guerrilla resistance movement during the Japanese occupation in World War II, Senator Cabili would die along with President Ramon Magsaysay in a plane crash on March 17, 1957, on Mt. Manunggal, Cebu. His paternal grandfather, Col. Natalio Ecarma Sr., belongs to Class ’23 of the Philippine Constabulary (now Philippine National Police) Academy while his father, Brig. Gen. Rodolfo Ecarma, belongs to Class '54 of the Philippine Military Academy and retired as Chief of Air Staff of the Philippine Air Force. An uncle, Lt. Natalio Ecarma Jr., was a fighter pilot who flew Mustangs (P-51) in the 1950s.

Ecarma attended Ateneo De Manila University, De La Salle Iligan and De La Salle University in his younger years before deciding to pursue a career in the military. He later attained his Bachelor of Science degree at the Philippine Military Academy and graduated in 1981. He earned a master's degree in Military Studies at the US Marine Corps University in 2002 and in 2005, earned a master's degree in National Security Administration (MNSA) from the National Defense College of the Philippines. In the same year, he was granted a scholarship for a doctorate degree on Mainland China Studies at the National Sun Yat-sen University at Kaohsiung, Taiwan.

To further enhance his professional development as a civil servant, Ecarma took and passed the Career Executive Service Officer (CESO) Board exams given by the Career Executive Service Board of the Civil Service Commission last August 2011 and is currently CESO eligible (CESE).

== Military career ==
After graduating from the Philippine Military Academy in 1981 and completing the Naval Officer Qualifying Course, he became a member of the Philippine Marine Corps. He took the Scout Ranger Course and later, the Special Forces Operations Course of the Philippine Army, excelling and graduating at the top of his class in both courses. Two years later in 1988, he completed and graduated from the U.S Army Ranger and Pathfinder Schools in Fort Benning, Georgia, U.S.A. A military SCUBA diver and master parachutist, he has had extensive experience in conducting hundreds of military freefall and static jumps.

Ecarma specializes in special operations, counter-insurgency and counter-terrorism. In 1995, then Major Ecarma created, organized and developed the special operations unit of the Philippine Marine Corps -the Force Reconnaissance Battalion. This unit is now extensively used, not only by the Philippine Marine Corps, but by the Armed Forces of the Philippines (AFP) as well in special operations and counter-insurgency operations in Mindanao and other conflict areas of the Philippines.

In 1999, he became Battalion Commander of the Presidential Guards Battalion and Operations Officer of the Presidential Security Group, making him responsible for protecting and securing two Philippine Presidents, numerous Heads of State and VIP's both locally and internationally.

Ecarma has acquired extensive staff and line positions at all levels of command of the Philippine Marine Corps. Following his successful stint as Brigade Commander of the 3rd Marine Brigade in Patikul, Sulu in Mindanao, he was appointed Deputy Commandant of the Philippine Marine Corps and concurrently Commanding General of all Marine Forces in the Southern Philippines.

=== Command Positions Held ===
Arranged in chronological order.

- Company Commander, 61st Force Reconnaissance (Special Operations) Company
- Director, Marksmanship and Sniper Training Unit, Marine Corps Training Center
- Battalion Commander, Force Reconnaissance (Special Operations) Battalion
- Assistant Chief of Staff for Intelligence, Philippine Marine Corps
- Battalion Commander, Presidential Guards Battalion, Presidential Security Group
- Assistant Chief of Staff for Operations, Presidential Security Group
- Assistant Superintendent, Marine Corps Training Center
- Assistant Chief of Staff for Education and Training, Philippine Marine Corps
- Chief of Staff, Philippine Marine Corps
- Brigade Commander, 3rd Marine Brigade
- Brigade Commander, Combat and Service Support Brigade
- Deputy Commandant, Philippine Marine Corps and
- concurrent Commanding General, Marine Forces Southern Philippines

=== Awards and decorations ===
==== Medals ====
Ecarma is a recipient of 2 Distinguished Service Stars, 2 Bronze Cross Medals, 17 Military Merit Medals, 6 Military Commendation Medals, an Anti- Dissidence Campaign Medal, a Luzon Campaign Medal, a Visayan Campaign Medal, a Military Civic Action Medal, a Mindanao Campaign Medal, and a Disaster Relief and Rehabilitation Operations Medal.

==== Badges ====
Ecarma's badges include a Presidential Unit Citation Badge, a General Staff Corps Badge, a master's in National Security Administration Badge, a Flag Rank Command Badge, A Marine Silver Command Badge, a Combat Commander's Kagitingan Badge, a US Ranger Tab, a Pistol Expert Badge, a Rifle Expert Badge, a US Army Honorary Parachutist Badge, a USA Pathfinder Badge, an AFP Master Parachutist Badge, an Election Duty Badge, several Marine Silver Command Badges and numerous Letters of Commendations and Plaques of Appreciation.

==== Other Awards ====
In January 2012, Ecarma was awarded the Outstanding Achievement Award for Prominently Meritorious Achievement by the Philippine Military Academy Alumni Association for having been appointed Head of Mission and Force Commander of a United Nations Peacekeeping Mission. In November of the same year during the Philippine Marine Corps' Birthday, he received the Crossed Rifles and Anchor Award from Philippine Marine Corps Commandant Major General Rustico Guerrero for exemplifying the highest standards of military efficiency and soldierly values as Head of Mission and Force Commander of UNDOF.

- Philippine Republic Presidential Unit Citation
- People Power I Unit Citation
- People Power II Ribbon
- Martial Law Unit Citation
- 2 Distinguished Service Stars
- 2 Bronze Cross Medals
- 17 Military Merit Medals with one spearhead device, one silver and three bronze anahaws
- 6 Military Commendation Medals
- 1 Military Civic Action Medal
- Long Service Medal
- Anti-dissidence Campaign Medal
- Luzon Anti-Dissidence Campaign Medal
- Visayas Anti-Dissidence Campaign Medal
- Mindanao Anti-Dissidence Campaign Medal
- Disaster Relief and Rehabilitation Operations Medal
- Outstanding Achievement Award
- Crossed Rifles and Anchor Award
- Combat Commander's Badge
- Master AFP Parachutist Badge
- Navy Parachutist Badge
- Philippine Marine Corps Force Recon Battalion Qualification Badge
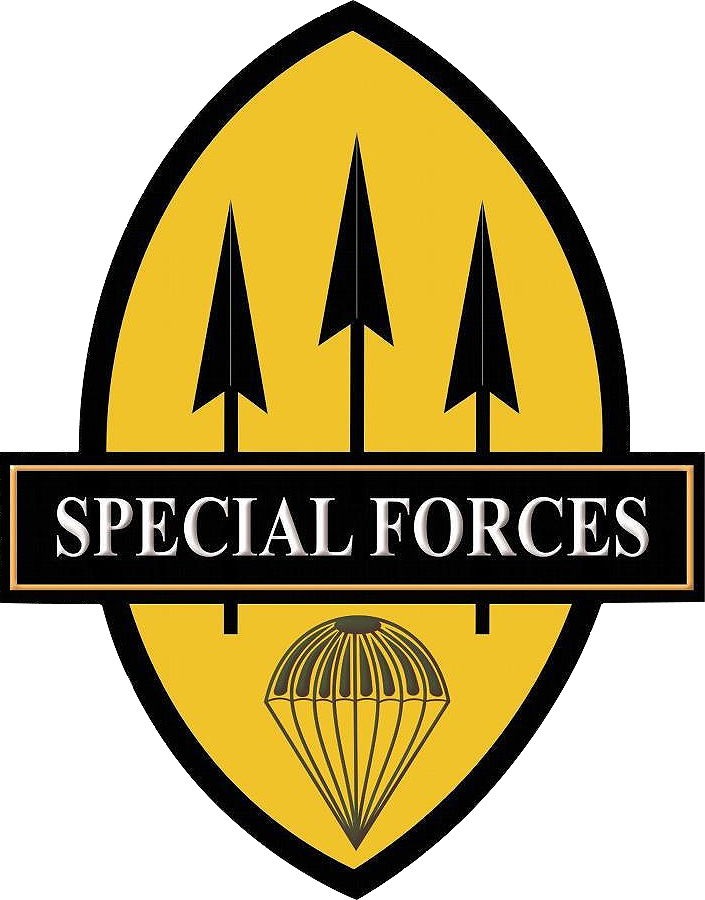
- Special Forces Qualification Badge
- AFP Election Duty Badge
- Ranger tab
- 7 Marine Silver Command Badges

== Peace and Development in Mindanao ==
Ecarma's extensive experience in fighting communist insurgency in the Philippines helped him formulate his strategy for “winning the hearts and minds” Filipino Muslims in Sulu, a province in the island of Mindanao. In 2007, when he assumed as Brigade Commander of the 3rd Marine Brigade, he embarked on peace and development initiatives through inter-faith dialogue and activities to break the communication barrier and misperceptions that the military, Christians and Muslims had against each other. He required all men under his command, especially those who had just reported for duty in Sulu to undergo an “Understanding Islam and Tausug Culture” lecture conducted by a Muslim lecturer before reporting to their battalions. This was to ensure that his men understood their culture and would treat the civilians with respect. He reached out to all sectors of society, from religious leaders, politicians and local officials, to civil society organizations, engaging in both formal and informal dialogue in his quest for peace.

One of his major achievements towards achieving sustainable peace and equitable development was bringing over a Christian non-governmental Organization called Gawad Kalinga whose mandate is building sustainable communities based on good values for poor, homeless people. He successfully engaged almost all sectors of Sulu society to be involved in this inter-faith activity. This endeavor which happened for the first time in Sulu's history proved that both Christians and Muslims desire peace and can work together regardless of religion, race or personal background.

Because of his peace and development initiatives in Sulu, various civil society organizations recommended him to the prestigious Asian Institute of Management to undergo a Bridging Leadership Fellowship program. This program helped him form, systematize and ensure the sustainability of his peace and development projects through a multi-stakeholder co-ownership approach. This approach helped bridge the gap among various leaders of the different stakeholders in Sulu, making them work together to attain lasting peace in the area.

== United Nations ==
In February 2010, after a thorough selection process among numerous contenders of different nationalities, UN Secretary-General Ban Ki-moon appointed him as the 17th Head of Mission and Force Commander of the United Nations Disengagement Observer Force (UNDOF) in the Golan Heights succeeding Major General Wolfgang Jilke of Austria. This made him the second Filipino after Lt. Gen Jaime Delos Santos (UNTAET) to be appointed Force Commander but the first Filipino in history to hold the position of Head of Mission of a United Nations Peacekeeping Mission at the same time. He held the rank of UN Assistant Secretary General and was concurrently the Special Representative of the Secretary General (SRSG) to the area.

For nearly three years, he commanded a military peacekeeping force of six contingents composed of military peacekeepers contributed by Austria, India, Croatia, Canada, Japan and the Philippines and 78 Military Observers coming from numerous countries from the United Nations Truce Supervision Organization based in Jerusalem. He also supervised and managed civilian personnel coming from 29 different nations.

His responsibilities and duties as the first Filipino general in UNDOF extended from purely military operations to administration, management, and international diplomacy. These included frequent interactions and negotiations with the Ministries of Foreign Affairs of both Syria and Israel, Ambassadors of the UN Security Council Permanent 5 (US, USSR, UK, China and France), Troop Contributing Countries of the UN and high-level civil and military officials of the United Nations, Israel, Syria, and other neighboring countries in the Middle East.

Ecarma was set to retire in June 2011. However, after being impressed with his performance in UNDOF, the United Nations requested the Philippine Government for an extension of his tour of duty. He served in the UN for another year before his term ended on August 13, 2012. Because of his experience, he was later on asked to be an adviser during the

Preceded by Wolfgang Jilke	Force Commander and Head of Mission of the United Nations Disengagement Observer Force; 10 March 2010 –13 August 2012	Succeeded by Iqbal Singha

== Department of National Defense ==
A year after his stint in the UN ended, he was called back to public service by President Aquino, this time as an Undersecretary of the Department of National Defense. As Undersecretary for Defense Operations, he advises and assists the Secretary of National Defense in formulating and implementing Department objectives and policies on matters pertaining to defense operations. His major duties include exercising functional supervision over the Armed Forces of the Philippines, as well as the AFP Reserve Force, Citizen Armed Force, civilian volunteer organizations, and civil military operations. He also exercises functional supervision over matters concerning UN Peacekeeping Operations and Philippine Expeditionary Forces, Internal Security Operations and Counter Terrorism. Recently, he has been tasked with the responsibility of overseeing the security component of APEC Manila 2015 as its Deputy Director General for Security. Last February 10, 2014, he was a guest at the formal opening of the Bangsamoro Transition Commission representing the Department of National Defense.

== Personal life ==
Ecarma's hobbies include reading and keeping fit by being involved in numerous sports. As a sports enthusiast, he is an avid shooter (combat and olympic events), and is also into skydiving, soccer, basketball, tennis, badminton, bowling, swimming, SCUBA diving and Pekiti-Tirsia Kali (Filipino Martial Arts).

Ecarma is married to the former Dr. Beverly Antonio. They have two sons: Nathan Charles and Nathan Christopher.

== See also ==
- United Nations Disengagement Observer Force
- Special Representative of the Secretary General
- Department of National Defense (Philippines)
- United Nations Security Council Resolution 1934
- National Defense College of the Philippines
- AFP Peacekeeping Operations Center
