= Dong Puno =

Filipino journalist (1946–2022)

Ricardo V. Puno Jr.

Press Secretary
- In office April 16, 2000 – January 20, 2001
- President: Joseph Estrada; Gloria Macapagal Arroyo
- Preceded by: Rodolfo T. Reyes
- Succeeded by: Silvestre Afable

Personal details
- Born: Ricardo Villanueva Puno Jr. January 20, 1946 Manila, Philippines
- Died: February 15, 2022 (aged 76)
- Party: NPC (2009–22)
- Other political affiliations: LDP (until 2009)
- Spouse: Clodelsa del Castillo
- Children: 2
- Education: Ateneo de Manila University (BA, LL.B); Harvard University (LL.M)
- Occupation: Lawyer, columnist, TV host
- Nickname: Dong

Ricardo "Dong" Villanueva Puno Jr. (January 20, 1946 – February 15, 2022) was a Filipino television public affairs host, media executive, newspaper columnist, and lawyer.

== Early life and education ==
Puno was born in Manila on January 20, 1946, a son of former Minister of Justice under the Marcos administration, Ricardo C. Puno and a brother of former Department of Interior and Local Government Secretary, Ronaldo "Ronnie" Puno and former congressman Roberto "Robbie" Puno. Puno held a Bachelor of Arts degree (cum laude) from Ateneo de Manila University (1965), a Bachelor of Laws degree (cum laude and salutatorian) from the same University in 1969 and a Master of Laws degree from the Harvard Law School.

== Career ==
Puno was Senior Vice President for News and Current Affairs of ABS-CBN Corporation and Executive Vice President of the ABS-CBN News Channel. On top of that, he wrote articles for his column My Viewpoint first appearing on The Philippine Star and later The Manila Times. He was the host for a public affairs program, Viewpoints, shown on ANC.

He was the senior partner of the Puno and Puno Law Offices, Vice President-General Counsel and Corporate Secretary of the nation's flag-carrier, the Philippine Airlines (1986–1990 and 1978–1983) and a member of the Philippine Panel for International Air Negotiations (1979–1990). He was also a past president of the Manila Overseas Press Club. He was also the former president of Guagua National Colleges in Guagua, Pampanga from 2008 until his retirement in 2012.

When President Joseph Estrada assumed power, Puno was appointed Press Secretary and ran unsuccessfully for a Senate seat in the 2001 senatorial race. After this debacle, he returned to the media profession and re-assumed his old position at ABS-CBN, but lost it anew after he chose to anchor the network's reformatted national late-night newscast Insider with Ces Oreña-Drilon in 2005. However, due to low ratings, the said newscast was canceled in the following year and was replaced by Bandila which marked the return of Korina Sanchez to the local newscasting scene. (Drilon then joined Bandila.) He then ran unsuccessfully for the lone congressional seat of Muntinlupa in 2007 against Congressman Ruffy Biazon. With Biazon term-limited (he ran for and lost a Senate seat), Puno again contested the seat in the 2010 election against Biazon's father, Rodolfo Biazon, but lost garnering 27% of the vote against Biazon's 46%.

In February 2011, he joined AksyonTV and started hosting a weekly political commentary program called De Kalibre.

He was the recipient of various awards in the fields of media and law: the 1985 TOYM awardee for Media and a KBP Golden Dove awardee (Best Male Host for Magazine Show, 1999; Ka Doroy Achievement Award, 1993 and the Best Public Affairs Show, 1990).

His program, Viewpoint, won the Catholic Mass Media Awards as Best Public Affairs Programs for three consecutive years (1984, 1985 and 1986) and was elevated to the Hall of Fame. His television shows (Dong Puno Live, Viewpoint & Focus) have also received recognition from the Gawad CCP Para sa Telebisyon and PMPC Star Awards for Television.

In March 2014, he joined DWIZ and started hosting a public affairs radio program called "Karambola".

== Personal life and death ==
Puno was married to Clodelsa del Castillo and they have two sons.

In 2015, Puno was reported to be afflicted with Parkinson's disease. He died on February 15, 2022, at the age of 76.

== Filmography ==
=== Film ===
- Juan Tamad at Mister Shooli: Mongolian Barbecue (cameo)

=== Television series ===
- Viewpoint (1984–1994; GMA)
- Focus (1989; New Vision 9)
- Business Today (1990–1994; GMA)
- Dong Puno Live (1995–2000; ABS-CBN)
- Dong Puno Tonight (2003; ABS-CBN)
- Insider (2005–2006; ABS-CBN)
- Viewpoints (2006–2007; ANC)
- Kalibre 41 (2011; AksyonTV)
- News5 Debates: Hamon sa Pagbabago (2011–2013; TV5 and AksyonTV)
- Dong Puno De Kalibre (2011–2013; AksyonTV)

Political offices
Preceded by Rodolfo Reyes	Press Secretary; 2000–2001	Succeeded by Silvestre Afable
Media offices
Preceded by Rodolfo Reyes	SVP for News and Current Affairs, ABS-CBN News (first stint); 1994–2000	Succeeded by Angelo Castro Jr.
Preceded by Angelo Castro Jr.	SVP for News and Current Affairs, ABS-CBN News (second stint); 2001–2004	Succeeded by Maria Ressa
