= Viewpoint (Philippine TV program) =

Philippine television public affairs show

- Title card
- Genre: Public affairs
- Presented by: Dong Puno; Teddy Locsin, Jr.
- Opening theme: "Magnetic Fields, Pt. 1" by Jean-Michel Jarre
- Country of origin: Philippines
- Original language: English

Production
- Running time: 60 minutes
- Production company: GMA News and Public Affairs

Original release
- Network: GMA Radio-Television Arts
- Release: August 21, 1984 – November 1994

Viewpoint is a Philippine television public affairs show broadcast by GMA Radio-Television Arts. Hosted by Dong Puno, it premiered on August 21, 1984. The show concluded in November 1994.

== Accolades ==
Accolades received by Viewpoint
Year	Award	Category	Recipient	Result	Ref.
1988	2nd PMPC Star Awards for Television	Best Public Affairs Program	Viewpoint	Nominated	
1988	2nd PMPC Star Awards for Television	Best Public Affairs Host	Dong Puno	Nominated	
1991	5th PMPC Star Awards for Television	Best Public Affairs Program	Viewpoint	Nominated	
1991	5th PMPC Star Awards for Television	Best Public Affairs Host	Dong Puno	Nominated	
