= National Defense College of the Philippines =

Public policy school in Quezon City, Philippines

- Kolehiyo sa Tanggulang Bansa ng Pilipinas
- Seal of the National Defense College of the Philippines
- Motto: Katiwasayan (Security)
- Type: Graduate; only program available: Master in National Security Administration (MNSA)
- Established: August 12, 1963; 63 years ago
- Affiliations: Department of National Defense
- Budget: ₱118.80 million (2020)
- President: Director Christine June P Cariño, MNSA
- Location: General Arturo Enrile Avenue, Camp General Emilio Aguinaldo, Quezon City, Philippines; 14°36′33″N 121°04′05″E
- Campus: Urban
- Website: www.ndcp.edu.ph
- Location within Metro Manila Location within Luzon Location within Philippines

The National Defense College of the Philippines (NDCP; Filipino: Kolehiyo sa Tanggulang Bansa ng Pilipinas) is an educational, training, and research agency of the Philippine government located inside Camp General Emilio Aguinaldo, Quezon City. It is responsible for providing continued and intensive studies of the diverse problems relating to national defense and security. It is under the Department of National Defense.

== History ==
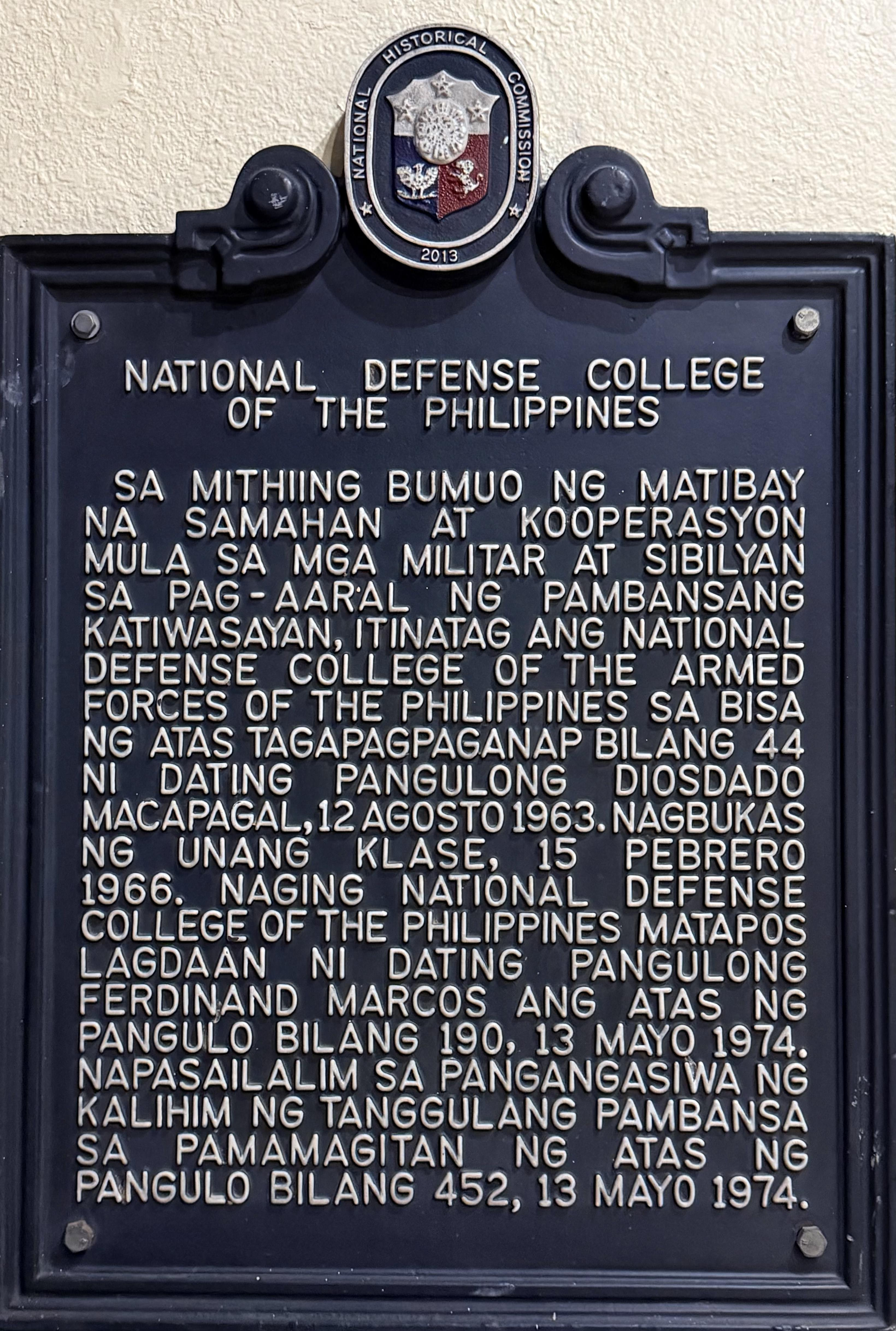
National historical marker installed in 2013

(in part copied from the public domain National Defense College of the Philippines website)

The National Defense College of the Philippines was first conceived in 1957 when the military advisors of the Southeast Asia Treaty Organization (SEATO) proposed the setting-up of a SEATO War College in the Philippines.

There were legislative moves to pass a law creating the National Defense College of the Philippines. In the House of Representatives, Congressman Manuel A. Zosa filed the House Bill No. 1420 in 1970 proposing an “Act Creating the National Defense College of the Philippines and for other Purposes.” Also in the same year, then Congressman Ramon Bagatsing filed the House Bill No. 1447 proposing an “Act Creating the National Defense College of the Philippines, Providing an Academic Board, and for Other Purposes.” In the Senate, Senator Leonardo B. Perez filed the Senate Bill No. 597 proposing an “Act Creating the National Defense College of the Philippines and for other Purposes.” However, these legislative proposals did not reach third reading because President Ferdinand Marcos dissolved the Philippine Congress.

President Marcos subsequently issued Presidential Decree No. 190 in 1973 to formally create the NDCP to "fulfill the need for an institution that will provide for continuing and intensive studies of the diversified problems related to national defense and security." NDCP was then placed under the Office of the Secretary of National Defense in 1974 by virtue of P.D. No. 452.

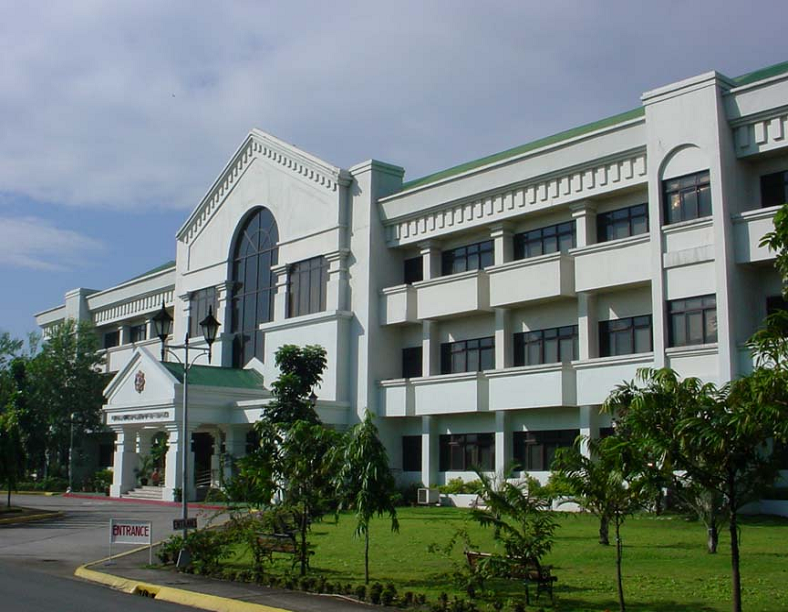
National Defense College of the Philippines

The Academic and Admission Boards were later established to oversee the academic program of the college. To carry out its teaching function, the NDCP draws top experts from the academe and senior officers with command and staff experiences from the major services of the Armed Forces of the Philippines.

Lectures by foreign diplomats, technical experts and defense leaders also complement the instruction at the NDCP. The NDCP has managed to grow beyond its modest beginnings to train leaders in the military and civilian bureaucracy in strategic thinking.

On February 22, 1998, the college moved to its new and modern three-story building in the Academic Row, Camp General Emilio Aguinaldo, Quezon City.

== Master in National Security Administration Program ==
The Master in National Security Administration (MNSA) Program is the main academic program of the NDCP.

The MNSA is open to military officers, government officials and private sector leaders. Civilian graduates are commissioned Lieutenant Colonels or Commanders in the Reserve Force, AFP.

== Strategic Research and Special Studies ==
=== Institute for National Security Studies ===
The Institute for National Security Studies (INSS) administers the research program of the NDCP. It embodies the college's effort to be the center of excellence in strategic thinking on national security matters in the Philippines and in the Asia-Pacific region.

=== Crisis Management Institute ===
The Crisis Management Institute (CMI), formerly the Emergency Management Institute of the Philippines (EMIP), is envisioned to be the country's center for education, training, and research on crisis management, terrorism, and other transnational crimes, and as the premier training resource for technical cooperation in emergency management in the Asia-Pacific region.

=== Defense Management Institute ===
The Defense Management Institute (DMI), formerly the Institute for Extramural and Continuing Studies (IECS), is envisioned to be the key training institution on certificate and diploma courses on National Security Administration and to be a recognized training institution in the Asia-Pacific.

== Notable alumni ==
Many government and business executives have graduated from the MNSA program; they comprise the general membership of the NDCP Alumni Association. The NDCP has produced the following notable alumni:

- Fidel V. Ramos - twelfth president of the Philippines; former Secretary of National Defense
- Jejomar C. Binay, LLB, MNSA Vice-President; formerly Mayor of Makati
- Loren Legarda - Senator; former broadcast journalist for ABS-CBN
- Heidi Mendoza - Undersecretary General for the United Nations Office of Internal Oversight Services
- Francis Tolentino, LLB, MNSA - chairman, Metropolitan Manila Development Authority
- Herbert Constantine Bautista, MPA, MNSA - Mayor of Quezon City
- Thelma Dumpit-Murillo - Director, Public Relations Office, Department of Trade and Industry and Manila Times columnist; former broadcaster for ABC 5
- Teresa Aquino-Oreta - former Senator and former Representative for Malabon-Navotas
- Margarita Cojuangco, MNSA, PhD - former Governor of Tarlac
- Major General Natalio C. Ecarma III - former Head of Mission and Force Commander of the United Nations Disengagement Observer Force
- Major General Ruwan Kulatunga RSP, ndc, psc - Deputy Vice Chancellor General Sir John Kotelawala Defence University
- Lieutenant General Emmanuel R. Teodosio, MNSA - former PMA Department Head, PMC Commandant and AFP Centcom Commander.
