= Gawad Plaridel =

Awarded to media personnel by University of the Philippines

UP Gawad Plaridel
- Awarded for: Adherence to highest professional and ethical standards and excellence in mass media
- Country: Philippines
- Presented by: University of the Philippines College of Mass Communication
- First award: 2004
- Website: masscomm.upd.edu.ph

The U.P. Gawad Plaridel is the sole award in the University of the Philippines System given to outstanding media practitioners.

The Gawad bestows honor on Filipino media practitioners who have excelled in any of the media (print, film, radio, television, and new media) and performed with the highest level of professional integrity in the interest of public service. The recognition, which comes with a trophy sculpted by National Artist Napoleon V. Abueva, is given to one practitioner in one medium for each year. The awardee is expected to deliver the Plaridel Lecture which addresses important media issues.

== Award profile ==
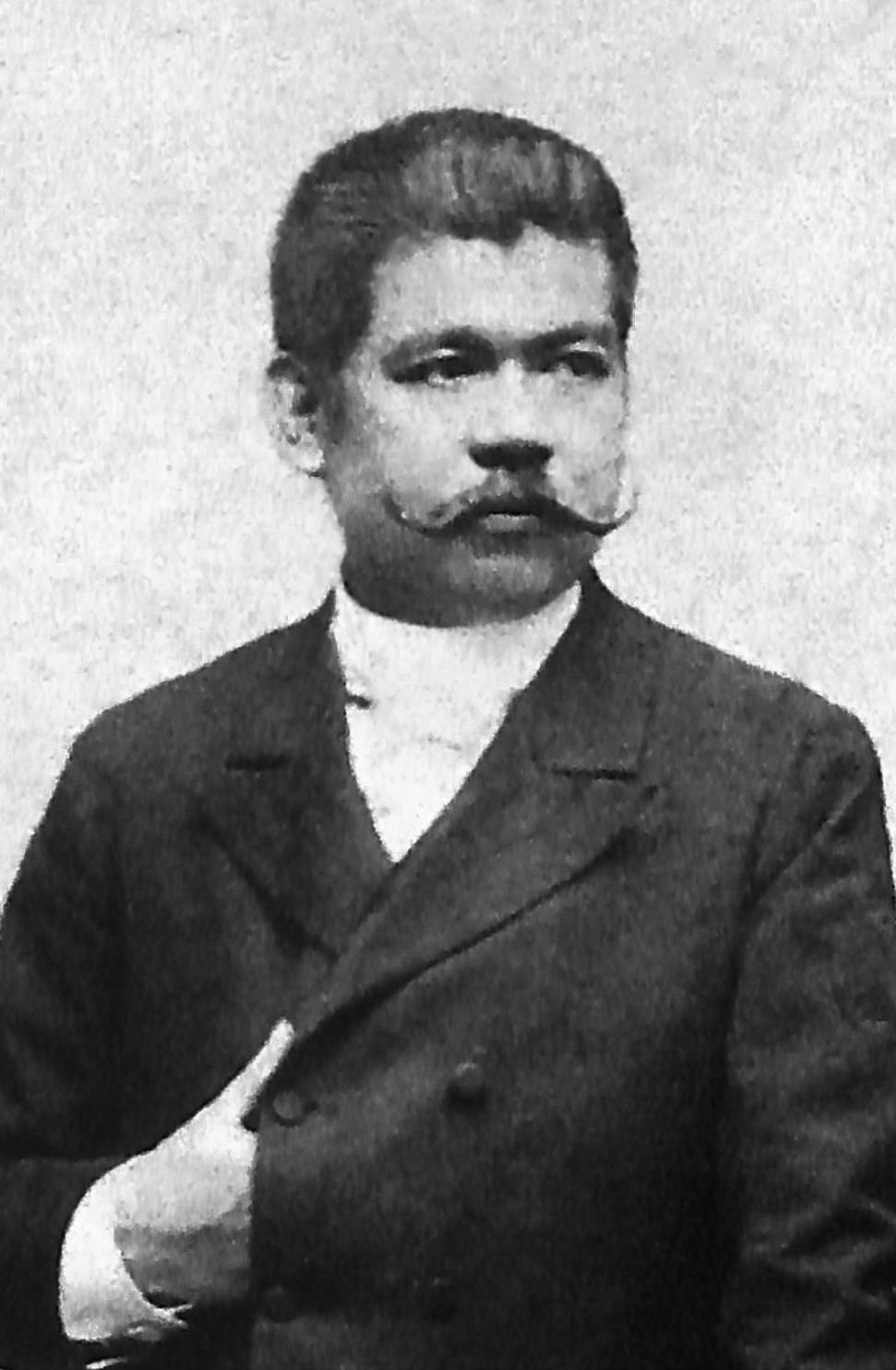
Marcelo H. del Pilar, Filipino journalist-reformist, was the inspiration for the UP Gawad Plaridel awarded by the College of Mass Communication.

The award is named after Marcelo H. del Pilar (pen name, Plaridel), the selfless propagandist whose stewardship of the reformist newspaper La Solidaridad from 1889 to 1895 helped crystallize nationalist sentiments and ignite libertarian ideas, mainly through his 150 essays and 66 editorials published under the pen name Plaridel. A crusading journalist, this native of Bulacan served as editor of the vernacular section of the Diariong Tagalog (Tagalog Newspaper), the first Philippine bilingual newspaper, in 1882. Among his major publications were Dasalan at Tocsohan (Prayerbook and Teasing Game), Pasyong Dapat Ipag-alab nang Puso nang Tauong Babasa (Passion That Should Inflame the Heart of the Reader), and La Soberania Monacal en Filipinas (Monastic Supremacy in the Philippines), all published in 1889.

From 1890 to around 1895, he edited and published La Solidaridad almost on his own because funds for the support of the fortnightly had become more and more difficult to raise in the Philippines. Del Pilar slowly lost hope in reforms and began to entertain the possibility of the Philippines separating from Mother Spain.

Pining for his mother country and suffering from tuberculosis, Del Pilar died in Barcelona, Spain on July 4, 1896, at the age of 45.

Like Plaridel, the recipient of this award must believe in the vision of a Philippine society that is egalitarian, participative, and progressive, and in media that are socially responsible, critical and vigilant, liberative and transformative, and free and independent.

Given annually, it started in 2004 with Eugenia Apostol, publisher and founding chair of the Philippine Daily Inquirer as its first awardee. In 2005, it was awarded to premier actress and current Batangas governor Vilma Santos, for film. Veteran radio broadcaster Fidela Mendoza-Magpayo, a.k.a. 'Tiya Dely', was the 2006 recipient. Cheche Lazaro received the award for 2007.

== 2008: Community Print Media ==
For 2008, Pachico A. Seares, editor-in-chief of Sun.Star Cebu and Sun.Star Superbalita (Cebu), was chosen as the recipient of the award for his "outstanding contributions to the print media industry." The judges cited Seares' contributions to community journalism, among them: his major help in steering Sun.Star Cebu and Sun.Star Superbalita [Cebu] to become the readership and advertising leaders among community newspapers in the country, his “continuing advocacy on issues that serve community interest, adopting and implementing journalism values that serve as example to Sun.Star affiliate papers in their respective areas, inspiring the community and regarding the people as citizens who can help the community.”

After the awarding rites, Seares delivered the Plaridel Lecture entitled "The Future of Community Newspapers," which situated the country's community print media today, presented the success story behind the two publications he heads and its growth into a network of publications, and presented prospects for the field in the future.

== 2009: Independent Film ==
Independent filmmaker Kidlat Tahimik (real name: Eric de Guia) was the recipient of the UP Gawad Plaridel for 2009. Known for his repertoire of independent films that mirror Filipino culture, including "Mababangong Bangungot," Tahimik encouraged budding film-makers and mass communication students to unleash the "sariling duwende" in producing their own motion pictures.

== 2010: No awardee ==
For the first time, no one bagged the Gawad Plaridel in 2010, which was supposed to honor an individual who made significant contributions to community radio. In a statement issued by the UP College of Mass Communication, it was said that while many of the nominees had made a mark in the industry, they were yet to achieve the highest level of professionalism and public service expected of a Gawad Plaridel recipient. UP CMC also acknowledged the fact that community radio is relatively young but still had room to develop itself into a mass medium worthy of recognition.

== 2011: Radio ==
Radio drama talent and director Eloisa Cruz-Canlas received the 2011 Gawad Plaridel for her work in Philippine radio drama through the years. The awarding ceremonies for Canlas were held on July 20 at the UP Film Institute in Diliman, Quezon City. Canlas was the executive producer of Drama Sa Nuebe Nubenta over DZIQ Radyo Inquirer 990 and has worked with DZRH and Radyo Natin-Nueva Ecija for many years, portraying the popular character Lola Sela.

== 2012: Television ==
The 2012 Gawad Plaridel recipient was Rosa Rosal.

== 2013: Print ==
The 2013 U.P. Gawad Plaridel recipient was Jose F. Lacaba, also known as Pete Lacaba.

== 2014: Transmedia: Film, Music and Television ==
Nora Aunor was the recipient of the 2014 U.P. Gawad Plaridel.

== 2015: Film ==
Ricardo Lee or Ricky Lee is the 2015 recipient of U.P. Gawad Plaridel.

== 2016: Radio ==
The University of the Philippines College of Mass Communication Gawad Plaridel recipient for this year is Francisca Custodio.

== 2017: Television ==
Tina Monzon-Palma a Filipina anchorwoman, won the Gawad Plaridel award in 2017. She is one of the first female news anchors on Philippine television. Tina began her work as one of the first news anchors of GMA Network when she first anchored News at Seven, The 11:30 Report and later GMA Headline News before she left in 1992 when Tina moved to the reopened TV5 (six years of post-EDSA revolution) and later ABS-CBN til present.

== 2018: Journalism ==
The Gawad Plaridel winner for 2018 was Jessica Soho.

== 2019: Transmedia: Theater, Film and Television ==
The Gawad Plaridel winner for 2019 was Bonifacio Ilagan.
