= Rod Reyes =

Filipino journalist and media executive

- Born: Rodolfo T. Reyes; August 11, 1935; Manila, Philippine Islands
- Died: April 14, 2016 (aged 80); Muntinlupa, Philippines
- Spouse: Vina Santiago-Reyes
- Children: Jun-Jun Reyes; Maria Theresa Reyes-Alvarez

Rodolfo T. "Rod" Reyes (August 10, 1935 – April 14, 2016) was a Filipino journalist and media executive. During the presidency of Ferdinand Marcos, he was general manager of two television networks: GMA Radio Television Arts from 1974 to 1975, and the Maharlika Broadcasting System (MBS) from 1980 to 1984. Reyes served as Cabinet Press Secretary to two presidents — Fidel V. Ramos and Joseph Estrada. He was also the founding publisher and editor-in-chief of Manila Standard, from its inception in 1987 until 1990.

== Career ==
=== Newspaper ===
Reyes began working in the newspaper industry at the age of 12. He was a sports writer of The Manila Times at the age of 16, later designated as an investigative reporter.

In 1961, Reyes was accorded the Journalist of the Year award due to his exposé on heroin drug syndicates in the suburbs of Malabon disguising as a drug addict. His exposé was adapted into a full-length film in 1977 entitled Sa Piling ng mga Sugapa, with Gil Portes directing the film and Mat Ranillo III portraying his role.

He was also awarded as the Ten Outstanding Young Men awardee and a Nieman Fellowship from the Harvard University. From the Times (where he was also a news editor), he moved to the Manila Chronicle (as the editor-in-chief until the closure due to martial law). He then published the magazines TV Times, Celebrity, Woman's Home Companion and Ginoo, the latter of which was ended in 1977.

After the People Power Revolution in 1986, Reyes planned to set up a newspaper with the help of the Elizalde family. He founded Manila Standard on February 11, 1987, with 19 pages on the maiden issue. He was the first publisher, editor-in-chief and chief operating officer of the paper from the first issue until 1990. Reyes also writes a column in the same newspaper, entitled "A Journalist's Memoirs" every Wednesday, of which he detailed his experiences both as a newspaper and broadcast executive.

=== Broadcasting ===
Reyes served as the executive vice president and news director of ABS-CBN in the 1960s, becoming his first foray in the broadcasting industry.

Reyes also served as a general manager and executive vice president of the GMA Radio Television Arts (when the Gozon-Duavit-Jimenez triumvirate took over the operations of Channel 7 from the Stewart family) in 1974, lasting eight months before he submitted his resignation in 1975 for health reasons, upon which he chose Freddie M. Garcia to be his successor. In 1977, Reyes joined the government-owned media agency called National Media Production Center (NMPC) at the invitation of Gregorio Cendaña. Reyes was also instrumental in establishing the Maharlika Broadcasting System (MBS; now known as People's Television Network) in 1980, serving as its general manager until his resignation on February 1, 1984 in the wake of the assassination of Ninoy Aquino. He was also a member of the Manila International Film Festival organizing committee from 1983 to 1984.

He is also a counsellor of the Philippine embassy based in Washington D.C.

Reyes later returned to ABS-CBN as the senior vice president of the news and current affairs division in 1990, 4 years after the network's reopening. Reyes was appointed as the Press Secretary from July 1992 until May 1993 under the Fidel V. Ramos administration. Under his watch, Reyes strengthened the presidential coverage by setting-up the Presidential News Desk. It was later reappointed by then-president Joseph Estrada and served from June 1998 to April 2000. He was later appointed as chief of the Manila Economic and Cultural Office - Taiwan.

== Death ==
Reyes died at the Asian Hospital and Medical Center in Muntinlupa on the evening of April 14, 2016 due to heart failure. He was 80.

Political offices
Preceded by Horacio V. Paredes	Press Secretary (first stint); July 1, 1992 – May 10, 1993	Succeeded by Jesus C. Sison
Political offices
Preceded by Hector R.R. Villanueva	Press Secretary (second stint); July 21, 1995 – June 29, 1998	Succeeded by Dong Puno
Media offices
Preceded by Angelo Castro Jr.	SVP for News and Current Affairs, ABS-CBN News (first stint); 1990–1992	Succeeded by Angelo Castro Jr.
Media offices
Preceded by Angelo Castro Jr.	SVP for News and Current Affairs, ABS-CBN News (second stint); 1993–1994	Succeeded by Dong Puno
