= Business Today (Philippine TV program) =

Philippine television public affairs show

- Genre: Public affairs
- Directed by: Jessica Soho
- Presented by: Karen Davila; Mon Isberto; Rico Hizon; Dong Puno
- Country of origin: Philippines
- Original language: English

Production
- Camera setup: Multiple-camera setup
- Production company: GMA News and Public Affairs

Original release
- Network: GMA Network
- Release: October 1, 1990 – March 29, 1996

Business Today is a Philippine television public affairs show broadcast by GMA Network. Hosted by Karen Davila, Rico Hizon, Dong Puno and Mon Isberto, it premiered on October 1, 1990. The show concluded on March 29, 1996.
