= The World Tonight (Philippine TV program) =

Philippine television news show

- Title card used since 2015
- Genre: Newscast
- Presented by: Tony Velasquez
- Theme music composer: Vangelis; Ryan Cayabyab; Johannes Bornlöf
- Opening theme: Pulstar (1986–1993); ABS-CBN News Theme (1993–2018); Mighty Rush 1 (2018–present)
- Country of origin: Philippines
- Original language: English

Production
- Executive producers: Biena Magbitang; Joel Caballero
- Production locations: Newsroom, ABS-CBN Broadcasting Center, Quezon City, Philippines
- Running time: 30 minutes (1966–1972; 1986–1999; 1999–2015; 2017–present); 1 hour (2015–2017)
- Production company: ABS-CBN News and Current Affairs

Original release
- Network: ABS-CBN
- Release: November 21, 1966 – September 22, 1972
- Release: September 15, 1986 – August 13, 1999
- Network: ANC
- Release: May 1, 1996 – present
- Network: Kapamilya Channel
- Release: July 27, 2020 – present
- Network: All TV
- Release: January 2, 2026 – present

The World Tonight is a Philippine television news broadcasting show broadcast by ABS-CBN, ANC, Kapamilya Channel and All TV. Originally anchored by Hal Bowie and Henry Halasan, it aired on ABS-CBN's evening line up from November 21, 1966 to September 22, 1972. The newscast returned on the network's evening line up from September 15, 1986 to August 13, 1999. The show began broadcasting on ANC on May 1, 1996, followed by a broadcast on Kapamilya Channel on July 27, 2020. Tony Velasquez currently serves as the anchor. It is the longest-running news broadcasting show in the Philippines.

== Airing history ==
=== The early years (1966–1972) ===
The World Tonight premiered on November 21, 1966, at 8:30 PM on ABS-CBN's DZXL-TV Channel 9 as the network's answer to ABC's The Big News. The World Tonight became one of the first Philippine television newscasts to broadcast in color. Co-anchoring the newscast were Hal Bowie, a veteran radio announcer and TV news anchor, and Henry Halasan, a former ABS-CBN Cebu station manager who was transferred to the network's main offices in Manila as a sales executive. Halasan coined the newscast's title after the program in the United States named, The World Today. Bowie, who was in his 70s when the newscast first aired, later bowed out of the newscast for health reasons and concentrated instead on writing and producing news reports for the network. This left Halasan as main anchorman of the program.

The program was transferred to its sister station, DZAQ-TV Channel 3 on the 10:00 PM timeslot a year later. This happened when Channel 9 premiered the half-hour daily evening news program called Newsbreak in March 1, 1967 at 9:00 PM with Bong Lapira, who transferred from rival newscast The Big News on ABC-5. Together, Lapira and Halasan became the twin faces of ABS-CBN News and by 1968, Newsbreak won the CAT Award, breaking the four-year winning streak of The Big News since 1964. The newscast continued after Channel 3 moved to the present Channel 2 for Metro Manila in November 14, 1969 until ABS-CBN's closure by the Marcos government during the declaration of martial law on September 22, 1972, with his sign Proclamation No. 1081.

The roster of field reporters for the newscast in its pre-Martial Law days included Orly Mercado, Jun Bautista, Antonio Seva, Tony Lozano, Boo Chanco, Philip Pigao, Lito Tacujan and Danny Hernandez.

=== Revival; Legarda-Castro era ===
The World Tonight returned on September 15, 1986, coinciding with the reopening of ABS-CBN after the People Power Revolution. It was anchored by Larry Ng (an ABS-CBN executive during the pre-Martial Law era), Angelo Castro Jr. (then the network's news director), and Loren Legarda who came from anchoring rival newscast NewsWatch on RPN with Harry Gasser. Ng left the newscast after a while and was replaced by Korina Sanchez. However, she eventually left the newscast to concentrate on hosting the morning show Magandang Umaga (later Magandang Umaga Po), leaving Castro, Legarda, and Amy Godinez (who left in 1991) as main anchors.

On May 4, 1992, the newscast introduced a new set (also shared with TV Patrol) and theme music as well as introducing Ces Drilon (or Cathy Yap-Yang for Business), and Dyan Castillejo (for Sports) as their new segment anchors. Sanchez returned as an anchor but only on Saturdays along with Castro (or Bon Vibar as his substitute), Drilon, Castillejo with additional segments by Angelique Lazo (entertainment). It was replaced by The Weekend News in 1996.

On December 4, 1995, The World Tonight relaunched its studio set, news desk, and graphics which became permanent until 1999.

=== Transition into cable; start of Castro-Palma era ===
The World Tonight began to simulcast on the network's cable news channel Sarimanok News Network (now ANC) launched on May 1, 1996, while it was still airing on ABS-CBN.

On February 9, 1998, Tina Monzon-Palma replaced Loren Legarda and joined Angelo Castro Jr. to the newscast when Legarda ran and later won as the top senator in the elections. Palma used to anchor rival newscasts GMA Headline News (on GMA Network) from 1986 until 1992 and The Big News (on the reopened ABC, now TV5) from 1992 to 1997. Loren Legarda made her final broadcast on the February 6, 1998 newscast.

However, beginning in late 1998, the ratings of English late-night newscasts including The World Tonight started to decline when rival GMA introduced Filipino language late-night news with the relaunch of GMA Network News, anchored by Mike Enriquez and Vicky Morales; it debuted as an English newscast in 1992 and switched to Filipino with the relaunch, surging ahead of the ratings game in the process.

The World Tonight made its final broadcast on ABS-CBN on August 13, 1999. It was then replaced by the network's first Filipino-language late-night newscast, Pulso: Aksyon Balita anchored by Korina Sanchez and Ted Failon. The show competed with Frontpage: Ulat ni Mel Tiangco, which replaced GMA Network News a week later on August 23 of the same day.

=== ABS-CBN News Channel years (1999–present) ===
Two months later, The World Tonight premiered solely on the network's 24-hour ABS-CBN News Channel (ANC) on October 11, 1999, due to the channel's relaunch. Angelo Castro Jr. and Tina Monzon-Palma still remained as anchors at that time. The program continues to be one of the channel's flagship newscasts.

On March 12, 2001, as part of the major programming changes of ABS-CBN, The World Tonight relaunched to its graphics along with other ANC and ABS-CBN newscasts.

Castro retired as a news anchor in September 2009, as Palma went solo. However, he later returned on November 7, 2011, on a sporadic basis until December 26 of that year. He died on April 5, 2012, of lung cancer at the age of 67.

=== Revitalization (2015–present) ===
On January 12, 2015, 3 days before the Philippine visit of Pope Francis, The World Tonight reformatted as part of the "internationalization" of the ABS-CBN News Channel. It moved to an earlier timeslot at 9:00 PM and expanded into a 1-hour newscast. New segments & reports with original content were also aired during the launching day.

On November 21, 2016, The World Tonight celebrated its 50th anniversary. Also this year, ANC marked its 20th anniversary. As part of the celebration of the two important milestones for the channel, an ANC X event was held at 8 Rockwell on December 7, 2016, which was attended by ABS-CBN executives, past and present anchors of The World Tonight and ANC, and prominent members of the business community. A documentary on the history of "The World Tonight" was aired on ANC on December 30, 2016.

On March 30, 2017, Palma took a sabbatical leave and Tony Velasquez temporarily took over as the program's main anchor. On January 29, 2018, Palma returned to the newscast after the leave, making her and Velasquez as the main anchors of the program.

However, the production of the newscast's Sunday edition was halted on March 22, 2020, due to the enhanced community quarantine done to help control the spread of the COVID-19 pandemic in the Philippines and was replaced by provisional programming from the ABS-CBN News Channel on the same date, as well as the extended edition of Documentary Hour from April 26, 2020, when the timesharing of programming between both DZMM TeleRadyo and ANC ended. It airs from Monday to Saturday at 9:00 PM.

On May 18, 2020, Palma and Velasquez returned to anchor the newscast after 2 months of hiatus in lieu of ANC and DZMM's special coverage on the COVID-19 pandemic. Like TV Patrol and the other programs airing on ANC and TeleRadyo, the newscast began to livestream online in their Facebook and YouTube channels.

The World Tonight Weekend aired its final episode on November 30, 2024, along with other channel-produced Saturday newscasts. This follows ABS-CBN’s announcement that it will lay off another batch of employees, including some reporters and cameramen, due to financial difficulties caused by declining ad revenues.

=== Kapamilya Channel (2020–present) ===
On July 27, 2020, The World Tonight started its broadcast on ABS-CBN's replacement channel, the 24-hour Kapamilya Channel (albeit as a delayed telecast), taking the timeslot previously occupied by Tonight with Boy Abunda and the replays of TV Patrol. This marks the newscast's indirect return on its original network as part of the Primetime Bida programming block after 21 years. It's also one of the few English-language programs on this channel.

In December 2020, main anchor Tina Monzon-Palma left the newscast, citing a new public affairs program starting in June 2021. Co-anchor Tony Velasquez replaced her as a main anchor.

On January 4, 2021, ANC head Nadia Trinidad announced on Twitter that it would relaunch The World Tonight with Tony Velasquez and Karen Davila, who replaced Palma after 22 years, while retaining the OBB, title card, theme music, and other graphics including the lower third (a maroon-used color introduced in November 2020) and the news ticker graphics currently used by the channel. However, the newscast is airing live from ABS-CBN's Studio 7 (which is also used to air ABS-CBN's flagship news program TV Patrol and was their original studio during their ABS-CBN days). As Palma "has retired from the daily grind", Trinidad said that she would have her own public affairs program launching "soon", which later debuted as Tina Monzon-Palma Reports in May 2021.

On October 8, 2021, ABS-CBN News announced that Davila would return to TV Patrol on October 11, replacing Noli de Castro. She was replaced by senior news reporter Pia Gutierrez.

From March 25 to April 7, 2022, The World Tonight temporarily suspended its delayed airing on Kapamilya Channel due to the special program of ABS-CBN News Harapan 2022, while it continued to broadcast on ANC.

On March 14, 2025, The World Tonight temporarily pre-empted its delayed airing on both ANC and Kapamilya Channel due to the delayed coverage of the pre-trial of former President Rodrigo Duterte at the International Criminal Court.

On August 29, 2025, Gutierrez left the newscast, leaving Velasquez as the sole anchor.

On January 2, 2026, The World Tonight started its simulcast on All TV as part of Kapamilya Channel sa All TV (later known as ABS-CBN sa All TV) brand under license agreement with Advanced Media Broadcasting System, replacing All TV News: Mabilis Lang 'To, marked its return to free-to-air television after almost 27 years since its final broadcast on ABS-CBN on August 13, 1999.

== Anchors ==
Anchors

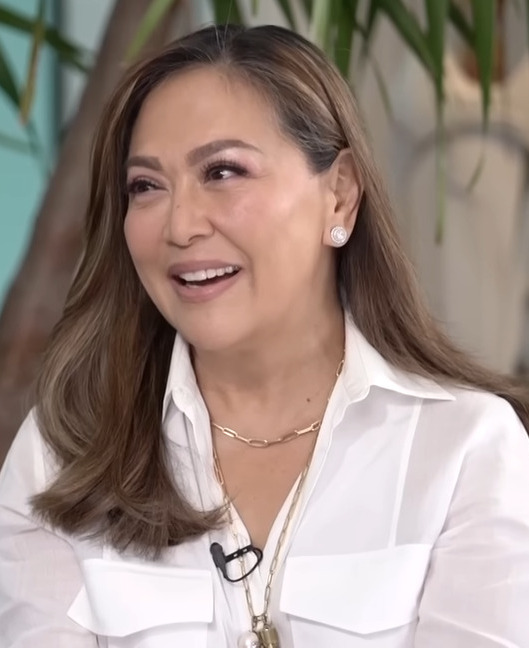
Karen Davila

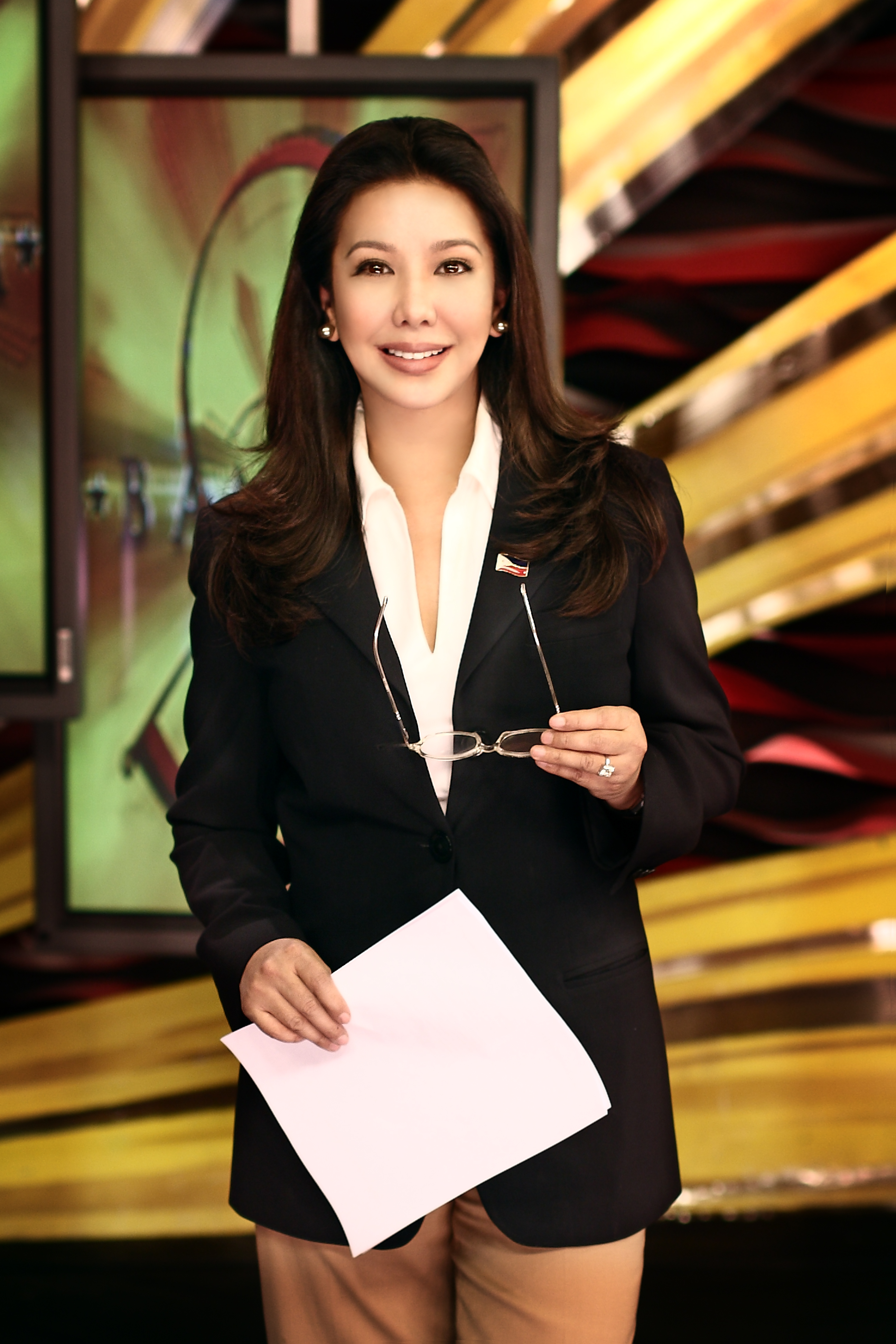
Korina Sanchez

=== Weeknight anchors ===
- Tony Velasquez (2015–present)

=== Substitute anchors ===
- Rica Lazo
- Bettina Magsaysay
- Ron Cruz
- Vivienne Gulla
- Migs Bustos
- Denice Dinsay

=== Former ===
- Hal Bowie (1966–67)
- Henry Halasan (1966–72)
- Ernie Garcia (1970-72)
- Angelo Castro Jr. (1986–99; 1999–2009; 2011–12)
- Loren Legarda (1986–98)
- Gel Santos-Relos (weatherwoman, 1986–92)
- Larry Ng (1986, relief anchor 1987–90)
- Ces Drilon (business anchor and occasional relief anchor for Legarda/Palma, 1992–99)
- Cathy Yap-Yang (alternate business anchor, 1994–99; main business anchor, 2015–17)
- Daphne Oseña-Paez (weatherwoman, 1997–99)
- TJ Manotoc (2015–17, "In the Zone")
- Coco Alcuaz (2015, "In Business")
- Amy Godinez-Cuenco (1989–91)
- Korina Sanchez (weekday anchor, 1986; Saturday/Sunday Edition anchor, 1987–95)
- Bon Vibar (alternate Saturday/Sunday Edition anchor for Castro, 1987–96, relief anchor for Castro Jr. 1986–96)
- Angelique Lazo (Saturday/Sunday entertainment anchor, 1987–95)
- Frankie Evangelista (relief anchor for Castro Jr., 1994–99)
- Gilbert Remulla (occasional relief anchor for Castro, 1994–99)
- Tina Monzon-Palma (1998–99; 1999–2017; 2018–21)
- Caroline Howard (weatherwoman, 1999–2017)
- Teodoro Locsin Jr. (2011–17) (segment anchor for "Teditorial")
- Marie Lozano (2015–16; segment anchor for "Scene")
- Warren de Guzman (2015–16; segment anchor for "Business")
- Dyan Castillejo (1992–99; 2015–16, segment anchor for "In the Zone")
- Gigi Grande (alternate weatherwoman, 1996–99; 2015–19, Saturday anchor)
- Ron Cruz (2013–20; Sunday anchor)
- Michelle Ong (segment anchor for "In Business")
- Karen Davila (2021)
- Stanley Palisada (2013–24)
- Pia Gutierrez (2021–25)

== Segments ==
- TWT Report
- In Business
- Metro Wrap
- ABS-CBN Weather Center
- World Focus
- 7,107
- In The Zone/Gametime
- Scene
- Market Wrap
- Final Word Tonight

== See also ==
- List of programs broadcast by ABS-CBN
- List of programs broadcast by the ABS-CBN News Channel
- List of Kapamilya Channel original programming
