= Cielito del Mundo =

Singer, actress, civil leader, politician and television host

Member of Quezon City Council from the 4th District
- In office February 2, 1988 – June 30, 1992

Personal details
- Born: Cielito del Mundo; 4 July 1935; Manila, Philippine Islands
- Died: 9 January 2016 (aged 80); Phoenix, Arizona, U.S.
- Occupation: Television host, actress, singer
- Nickname(s): Mahal; The Queen of Public Service

Cielito del Mundo (July 4, 1935 – January 9, 2016), also known as Mahal, was a Filipina singer, actress, civic leader, politician and television host. She was one of the original hosts of Kapwa Ko Mahal Ko, the longest running public service television program in the country (which aired on GMA Network), in 1975. She was also the host of Mahal, a similar public service program aired on Intercontinental Broadcasting Corporation (IBC-13), while acting as the chairman of her own foundation, the Mahal Foundation. Mahal also entered the politics when she was elected as councilor of Quezon City's 4th District.

== Death ==
Del Mundo died on January 9, 2016, while in coma in a hospital in Phoenix, Arizona after she suffered massive stroke and brain tumor.

== Filmography ==
=== Television ===
- Kapwa Ko Mahal Ko (1975-1990)
- Mahal (1975–1998)
- Klik na Klik sa Trese (1992–1997)

=== Films ===
- Langit Pa Rin Kita (1967)
- Basta Bisaya (1970)
- Mga Ibong Pipit (1984)

== See also ==
- Kapwa Ko Mahal Ko
