= Force Reconnaissance Regiment =

Philippine Marine Corps' elite ground forces unit

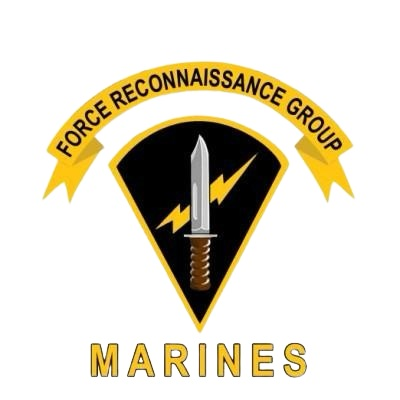
- Insignia of the Force Reconnaissance Regiment, previously called the Force Reconnaissance Group
- Active: August 19, 1972 - present
- Country: Philippines
- Branch: Philippine Marine Corps
- Type: Special Operations Forces
- Size: classified
- Part of: Philippine Marine Corps
- Garrison/HQ: Marine Barracks, Bonifacio Naval Base, Makati
- Nicknames: Force Recon; FORECON
- Mottos: Swift, Silent, Deadly
- Mascots: Lightning & Dagger
- Anniversaries: April 18
- Engagements: Anti-guerilla operations against the New People's Army and the Moro Islamic Liberation Front; Anti-terrorist operations against the Abu Sayyaf; Operation Enduring Freedom - Philippines; International Peace Support and Humanitarian Relief Operations UN Operations; 2017 Marawi crisis
- Decorations: Presidential Streamer Award

Commanders
- Current Commander: COL Oliver F Baylon, PN(M)(GSC)
- Notable commanders: ENS Edgardo Espinoza PN(M); LTC Ariel Querubin PN(M)(GSC); 1LT Custodio Parcon PN(M); MAJ Natalio C. Ecarma PN(M)
- Naval Parachutist Badge

The Force Reconnaissance Regiment (FRR) is the Philippine Marine Corps' premiere ground force unit for unconventional warfare and special operations.

It specializes in sea, air and land operations, like its counterpart in the Special Warfare Force of the Philippine Navy, ranging from reconnaissance, close combat, demolition, intelligence and underwater operations in support to the overall naval operations.

== History ==
Just months after the activation of the 1st, and 2nd Marine Brigade Landing Teams of the then-Philippine Marine Brigade, the 1st Reconnaissance Company was founded on August 19, 1972. Its first Commander was then-ENS Edgardo V Espinosa, PN, who will later become a Commandant of the now-Philippine Marine Corps. Although founded in 1972, 1RC will trace its roots from the Scout Raider Platoon during the PMC's nascent days in the 1950s and received its first training from Philippine Army special forces units.

Operating in four-man teams, the Company's first actions were to neutralize the Muslim secessionists in Mindanao, led by the Moro National Liberation Front (MNLF) in the early 1970s.

On September 16, 1985, it was reformed as the 61st Marine (Recon) Company, now seeing action against the New People's Army of the Communist Party of the Philippines, and upon expansion, it was renamed as the Force Reconnaissance Battalion (FRBn) on April 18, 1995.

As part of the ongoing expansion and modernization of the entire Armed Forces, the FRBn was officially renamed in April 2018 as the Marine Special Operations Group. MARSOG was eventually renamed as the Force Reconnaissance Group (FRG) on July 31, 2018.

To comply with the Philippine Navy's Comprehensive Archipelagic Defense Concept, the FRG was renamed as the Force Reconnaissance Regiment (FRR) in 2025.

== Training ==
MSOG operators are usually Basic Airborne Course and Scout Ranger Course qualified, and most importantly they must finish the Force Reconnaissance Course to qualify. They also undergo Jungle Environment Survival Training (JEST).

Training lasts for six months, which is followed by a test mission, which is usually a combat operation. 60 prospective Marine candidates are usually in these courses.

Their American counterparts are the USMC Force Reconnaissance units, and cross-trains with them.

== Organization ==
The unit is organized to the following:

- HQ and Training Company
- 61st Reconnaissance Company
- 62nd Reconnaissance Company
- 63rd Reconnaissance Company
- 64th Reconnaissance Company
- 65th Reconnaissance Company
- 66th Reconnaissance Company
  - Activation Date: March 2025

=== Equipment ===
The FRR is known to use M4 carbines with M203 grenade launchers and the Glock 21 with the M134 minigun for fire support.
