= Kapwa Ko Mahal Ko =

Philippine television public service show

- Title card since 2025
- Also known as: My Brother's Keeper
- Genre: Public broadcasting
- Presented by: Orly Mercado; Rosa Rosal; Antonio Talusan; Nonoy Zuñiga; Boots Anson-Roa; Rosemarie Gil; Helen Vela; Juan Flavier; Cielito del Mundo; Tina Monzon-Palma; Susan Valdez; Connie Angeles; Mildred Ortega; Toni Rose Gayda; Rose Clores; Gina de Venecia
- Theme music composer: Nonoy Zuñiga; Eddie Ilarde
- Opening theme: "Kapwa Ko Mahal Ko" by Karla Mae Rodelas
- Country of origin: Philippines
- Original language: Tagalog

Production
- Producer: Orly Mercado
- Camera setup: Multiple-camera setup
- Running time: 30 minutes
- Production companies: Kapwa Ko, Mahal Ko Foundation, Inc.

Original release
- Network: GMA Network
- Release: December 1, 1975 – present

Kapwa Ko Mahal Ko (transl. my kindred my love / international title: My Brother's Keeper) is a Philippine television public service show broadcast by GMA Network. Originally hosted by Rosa Rosal, Orly Mercado and Antonio Talusan, it premiered on December 1, 1975. Produced by Kapwa Ko, Mahal Ko Foundation, Inc., it was the first television show in the Philippines to use sign language interpreters. Mercado and Connie Angeles currently serve as the hosts. It is the longest running television show in the Philippines.

== Overview ==
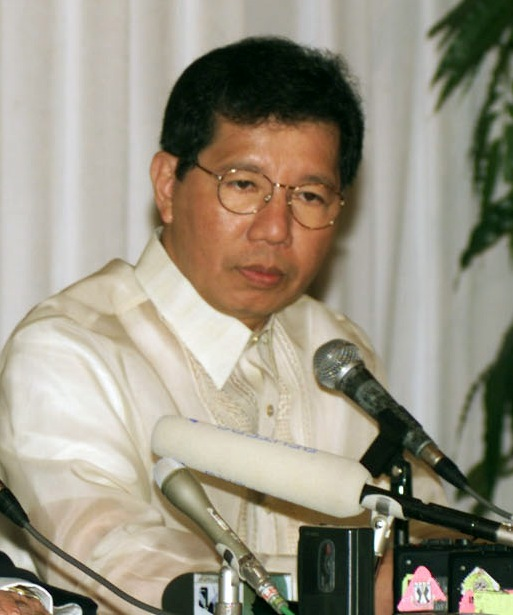
Orly Mercado serves as a host.

It was first broadcast on GMA Network on December 1, 1975, with Rosa Rosal, Orly Mercado and Antonio Talusan serving as the hosts. In June 1976, the Kapwa Ko Mahal Ko Foundation was established. In the 1980s, Boots Anson Roa, Susan Valdez, Connie Angeles, and Cielito del Mundo joined the show as hosts. Two doctors, Susy Pineda and Nonoy Zuñiga also joined the show. In the 1990s, Mildred Ortega, Rose "Manang Rose" Clores, and Toni Rose Gayda became part of the show.

== Hosts ==
- Orly Mercado
- Connie Angeles (since 1983)
- Camille Angeles (field correspondent and segment host)

Former hosts

- Rosa Rosal (1975–86)
- Antonio Talusan (1975–76)
- Nonoy Zuñiga (1975–2001)
- Boots Anson-Roa (1975–83)
- Rosemarie Gil (1975–98)
- Helen Vela (1975–85)
- Juan Flavier (1975–92)
- Cielito del Mundo (1975–90)
- Tina Monzon-Palma (1976–77)
- Susan Valdez (1980–2003)
- Mildred Ortega (1990–2003)
- Toni Rose Gayda (1990–96)
- Rose Clores (1991–2003)
- Gina de Venecia (1997–2003)

== Production ==
In March 2020, production was halted due to the enhanced community quarantine in Luzon caused by the COVID-19 pandemic.

== Accolades ==
Accolades received by Kapwa Ko Mahal Ko
Year	Award	Category	Recipient	Result	Ref.
1987	1st PMPC Star Awards for Television	Best Public Service Program	Kapwa Ko Mahal Ko	Won	
1988	2nd PMPC Star Awards for Television	Best Public Service Program	Kapwa Ko Mahal Ko	Won	
1988	2nd PMPC Star Awards for Television	Best Public Service Program Host	Cielito del Mundo	Nominated	
1989	3rd PMPC Star Awards for Television	Best Public Service Program	Kapwa Ko Mahal Ko	Won	
1990	4th PMPC Star Awards for Television	Best Public Service Program	Kapwa Ko Mahal Ko	Won	
1991	5th PMPC Star Awards for Television	Best Public Service Program	Kapwa Ko Mahal Ko	Nominated	
1991	5th PMPC Star Awards for Television	Best Public Service Program Host	Cielito del Mundo Nonoy Zuñiga	Nominated	
1992	6th PMPC Star Awards for Television	Best Public Service Program	Kapwa Ko Mahal Ko	Nominated	
1992	6th PMPC Star Awards for Television	Best Public Service Program Host	Susy Pineda Nonoy Zuñiga	Nominated	
2005	Catholic Mass Media Awards	Best Public Service Program	Kapwa Ko Mahal Ko	Won	
2008	Catholic Mass Media Awards	Serviam Award	Kapwa Ko Mahal Ko	Won	
2010	6th USTV Awards	Lifetime Achievement Award for Public Service	Kapwa Ko Mahal Ko	Won	
2025	38th PMPC Star Awards for Television	Best Public Service Program	Kapwa Ko Mahal Ko	Nominated	
2025	38th PMPC Star Awards for Television	Best Public Service Program Host	Connie Angeles Orly Mercado	Nominated	
