= Sentro =

- Final title card from March to August 2008
- Genre: News program Live television
- Created by: ABC Development Corporation
- Directed by: Rosario Andres
- Presented by: John Susi; Ali Sotto; Martin Andanar
- Narrated by: Mike Carreon
- Country of origin: Philippines
- Original languages: Filipino (2004–07); English (2007–08)

Production
- Executive producers: Sonny Fernandez; Jackie Sierda
- Production locations: ABC 5 Studio B, Novaliches, Quezon City
- Running time: 30 minutes
- Production company: ABC News and Public Affairs

Original release
- Network: ABC
- Release: April 12, 2004 – August 8, 2008

Sentro (transl. center) was a Philippine television news broadcasting show broadcast by ABC. Originally anchored by John Susi and Ali Sotto, it premiered on April 12, 2004, on the network's evening line up replacing Balitang Balita. The show concluded on August 8, 2008. Martin Andanar served as the final anchor. It was replaced by TEN: The Evening News in its timeslot.

== History ==
=== 2004–2006; Susi-Sotto era ===
The newscast premiered on April 12, 2004, replacing Balitang Balita. It was first anchored by John Susi who was held over from its predecessor Balitang Balita and former actress Ali Sotto. Sotto that time was in contract with GMA Network under its radio arm DZBB.

=== 2006–2008; Andanar era ===
Title card used from 2007 to 2008

On October 2, 2006, the newscast exchanged timeslots with Big News, the evening news program of the network. Susi and Sotto were later replaced by Martin Andanar, who became the final anchor of the newscast.

On June 25, 2007, Sentro was reformatted into an all-English newscast, as an answer to Q's News on Q, despite the retention of the name and some of the opening text and ending reminders still in Filipino. This used to be the language of Big News before its main language was changed to Filipino in 2004.

On August 8, 2008, Sentro, alongside Big News, aired its final broadcast; it is also the last program to be aired on ABC 5 before it signed off for the last time at around 10:00pm, and rebranded the next day as TV5.

== Anchors ==
Anchors

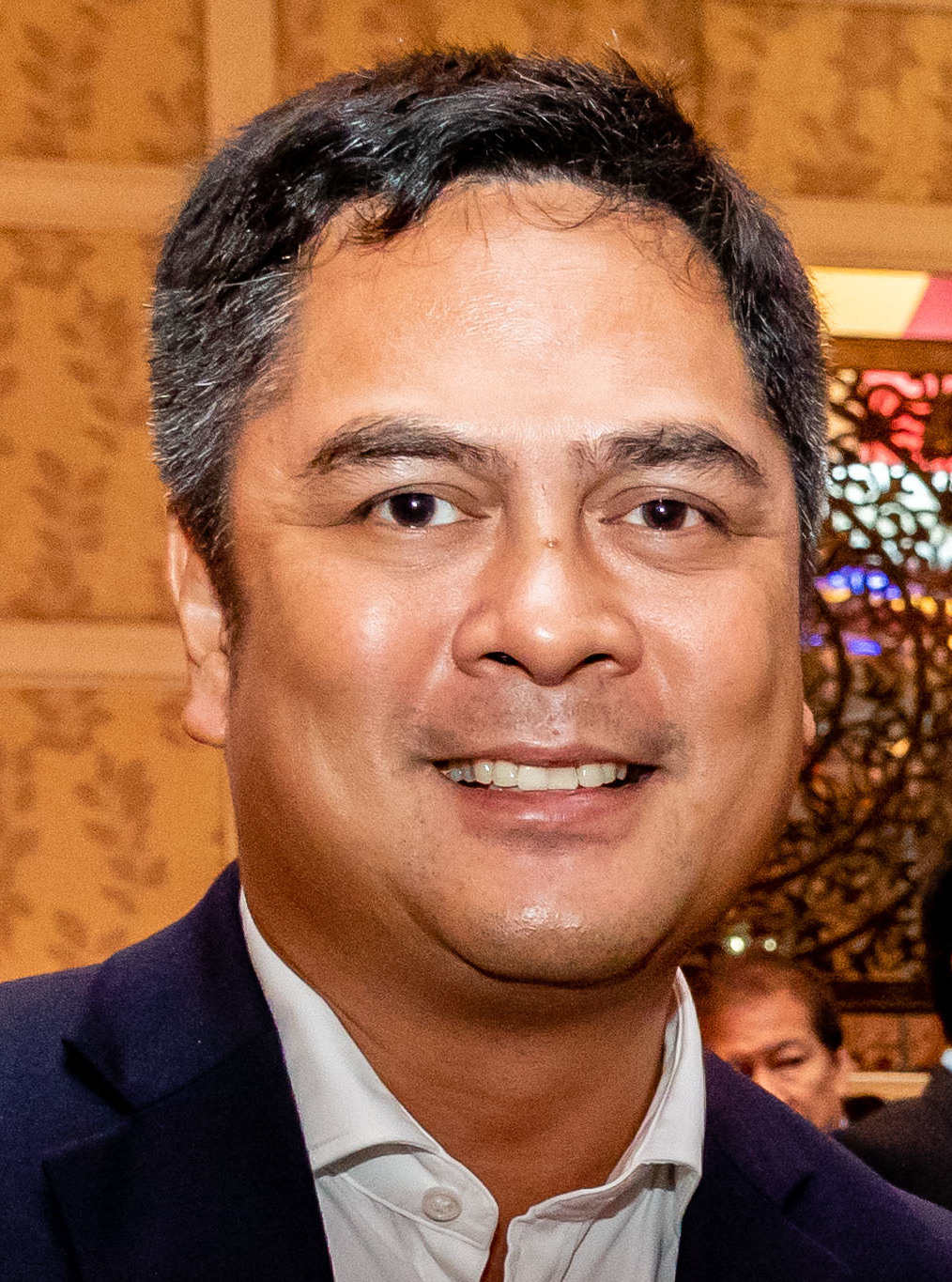
Martin Andanar served as an anchor.

- John Susi (2004–06)
- Ali Sotto (2004–06)
- Martin Andanar (2006–08)

== Substitute anchors ==
- Amelyn Veloso
- Jove Francisco

== See also ==
- News5
- List of TV5 (Philippine TV network) original programming
- List of Philippine television shows
