= Dong Puno Live =

- Also known as: Dong Puno Nightly (2002); Dong Puno Tonight (2002–2003)
- Genre: Talk show
- Developed by: ABS-CBN News and Current Affairs
- Presented by: Dong Puno; Doris Bigornia
- Theme music composer: Ryan Cayabyab (1995-2000); Jonathan Merrill (2003-2005)
- Opening theme: ABS-CBN News Theme (1995-2000); Industrial Strength News (2003-2005)
- Country of origin: Philippines
- Original language: Filipino
- No. of episodes: n/a

Production
- Running time: 60 minutes

Original release
- Network: ABS-CBN
- Release: February 2, 1995 – April 5, 2000
- Release: August 28, 2003 – June 29, 2005

Dong Puno Live was a Philippine talk show broadcast by ABS-CBN. Hosted by Dong Puno, it aired from February 2, 1995 to April 5, 2000 and from August 28, 2003 to June 29, 2005, replacing Gus Abelgas Nag-Uulat.

== Hosts ==
Dong Puno and Doris Bigornia take viewers to a discussion of the hottest issue of every week. They dig into no-nonsense banter because they believe the country's problems cannot be addressed just by an outburst of words and emotion.

== See also ==
- List of programs broadcast by ABS-CBN
- Dong Puno
