= Orly Mercado =

Filipino politician (born 1946)

The Honorable Orlando S. Mercado
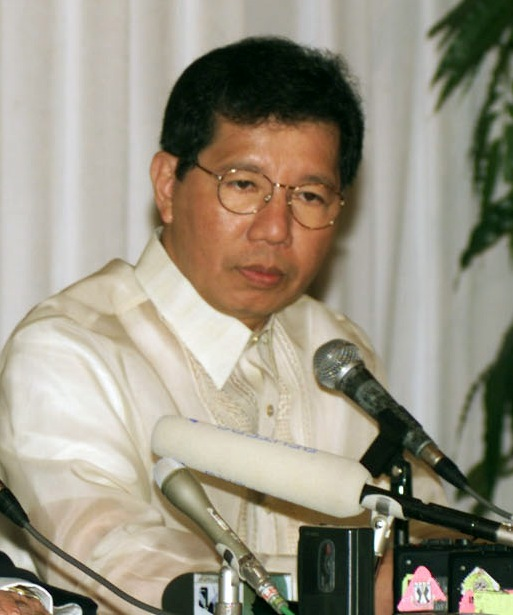
- Mercado in 1999

President of the Radio Philippines Network
- In office 2008–2009
- Preceded by: Mia Concio
- Succeeded by: Tonypet Albano

20th Secretary of National Defense
- In office June 30, 1998 – January 19, 2001
- President: Joseph Estrada
- Preceded by: Fortunato Abat
- Succeeded by: Vacant
- In office January 22, 2001 – January 25, 2001
- President: Gloria Macapagal Arroyo
- Preceded by: Vacant; Post last held by himself
- Succeeded by: Eduardo Ermita (acting); Angelo Reyes

Senator of the Philippines
- In office June 30, 1987 – June 30, 1998

Senate Majority Leader
- In office July 27, 1987 – October 31, 1989
- President: Corazon Aquino
- Preceded by: Vacant; Post last held by Arturo Tolentino
- Succeeded by: Teofisto Guingona, Jr.

Mambabatas Pambansa (Assemblyman) from Quezon City
- In office June 30, 1984 – March 25, 1986 Serving with Ismael A. Mathay, Jr., Cecilia Muñoz-Palma and Alberto Romulo

Personal details
- Born: April 26, 1946 (age 80) Manila, Commonwealth of the Philippines
- Party: Lakas (2004–present); Independent (2001–2004); LDP (1992–2001); Liberal (1987–1992); UNIDO (1984–1987)
- Spouse(s): Dorothy Jane Douglas; Susan Pineda
- Education: University of the Philippines
- Occupation: Diplomat, Politician, Professor, Broadcaster

Orlando "Orly" Sanchez Mercado (Tagalog pronunciation: [ˈsɐntʃes mɛɾˈkadɔ], April 26, 1946) is a Filipino politician and broadcast journalist best known for having served as a Senator of the Philippines from 1987 to 1998, Secretary of Defense from 1998 to 2001, president and CEO of Radio Philippines Network from 2008 to 2009, and for his long career as a broadcast journalist, most famously for hosting the television program Kapwa Ko Mahal Ko.

== Career ==
=== Early career and Martial Law Imprisonment ===
Mercado's career in Radio broadcasting began when he got a job as Disc Jockey for the program Night Life on Manila FM Station DZXX. He then became an ABS-CBN journalist in 1968, taking on roles as a reporter for The World Tonight.

He was the head and anchor of Radyo Patrol of ABS-CBN when it started in 1969. It was the first all-talk, all-news 24 hour radio station—the first of its kind in the Philippines. He was also anchor for the Filipino newscast Apat na Sulok ng Daigdig in Channel Four. He also hosted his own morning show, originally called “Orly Bird” however the title of the show was changed after an incident occurred when radio announcer Henry Ragas mistakenly announced “Orly’s Bird” instead. Upon Marcos' Proclamation No. 1081 in 1972, Orly was charged for subversion under Republic Act 1700 (Anti-Subversion Law) and was detained in Fort Bonifacio. He was released after nine and a half months of detention and started teaching communication subjects in the University of the Philippines, Maryknoll College (now Miriam College), Ateneo de Manila University, and Assumption College.

=== Kapwa Ko Mahal Ko ===
On December 1, 1975, GMA Network launched the first Philippine public health-public service program on Channel 7, Kapwa Ko Mahal Ko (I Love My Fellowmen). Mercado was one of the original hosts and executive producer of the program. Later, he became President of the foundation bearing the same name.

=== Senator of the Philippines ===
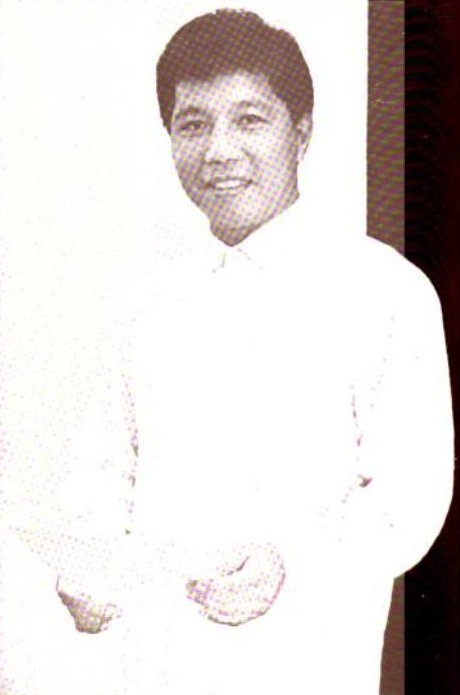
Mercado as a senator, photograph released by the Philippine Congress, c. 1988

Mercado ran and won as a Senator of the Philippines for two consecutive terms, first in 1987 until 1992, and then again from 1992 to 1998.

As Senator, among the measures he authored are:

- R.A. 6675 (1988) – Generics Drug and Medicines Act of 1988
- R.A. 6959 (1990) – An Act establishing provincial centres for Science and Technology
- R.A. 7277 (1992) – Magna Carta for Disabled Persons
- R.A. 7394 (1992) – Consumer Act of the Philippines
- R.A. 8172 (1995) – An Act promoting Salt Iodization nationwide
- R.A. 7719 (1994) – National Blood Services Act of 1994
- R.A. 8370 (1997) – Children's Media Act of 1996
- R.A. 8851 (2000) – Philippine National Police Reform Act

=== Secretary of National Defense ===
In 1998, he was appointed Secretary of National Defense by President Joseph Estrada. On January 19, 2001, the Chief of Staff and all of the commanding generals of the Armed Forces of the Philippines, together with the rest of the military establishment, withdrew their support for President Estrada who was then facing impeachment for plunder and corruption. Their appearance before a throng of protesters at the EDSA Shrine was the culmination of what was to be known as EDSA People Power II (Second EDSA Revolution), which ousted President Estrada from office. Mercado was reappointed Secretary of Defense by incoming President Gloria Macapagal Arroyo but resigned the post in protest of the designation of a former Chief of Staff as National Security Adviser who was also the subject of Mercado's anti-corruption campaign in the Department of National Defense.

As Secretary/Minister of Department of National Defense, he:

- Instituted a reorganization program in the Department of National Defense to assert civilian supremacy over the military
- Initiated reforms in the Retirement and Separation Benefit Systems (RSBS), the pension fund of the soldiers
- Instituted a computerization program for the Philippine Veterans Affairs Office (PVAO)
- Pioneered the use of electronic technology for procurement of equipment and supplies of the Armed Forces of the Philippines

=== Ambassadorial positions ===
In 2008, Gloria Macapagal Arroyo nominated Mercado as Philippine ambassador to the China (People's Republic of China), also accredited to North Korea (Democratic People's Republic of Korea) and Mongolia. However, his nomination was opposed by Senator Jinggoy Estrada, then a member of the Commission on Appointments, who blamed Mercado’s participation in EDSA Dos as the reason why his father, former President Joseph Estrada, got ousted. .

In 2009, he was appointed as the first permanent representative of the Philippines to the Association of Southeast Asian Nations (ASEAN). As a newly created ambassadorial post, it then did not require Commission on Appointments approval. The charter of the ASEAN required that all members have a Permanent Representative.

As the Philippines' first Permanent Representative to the ASEAN, he:

- Established the Philippine mission in Jakarta, Indonesia.
- Led efforts in the Committee of Permanent Representatives (CPR) to introduce transparency and accountability in the ASEAN Secretariat by way of extensive budget hearings.
- Initiated ASEAN's strategic communication plan, which could create a level of awareness and understanding about the regional organization as an imperative in the effort to create an ASEAN Community by 2015.

=== EROPA Secretary General ===
Mercado served as the Secretary-General of the Eastern Regional Organization for Public Administration (EROPA), an organization of states, groups and individuals in the general area of Asia and the Pacific, from 2010 to 2021.

=== Teaching and return to broadcasting ===
He has taught courses in Public Administration and Communication in the University of the Philippines where he obtained all his degrees: Bachelor of Arts in Political Science, Master of Arts in Communication, and Doctor of Philosophy in Political Science. He also teaches at the Ateneo de Manila University School of Government. On June 17, 2013, he returned to radio broadcasting with his program "Orly Mercado: All Ready" on Radyo5 92.3 News FM.

== Personal life and family ==
Mercado's wife, Dr. Susan Pineda-Mercado, is the highest-ranking Filipino woman in the World Health Organization (WHO). She is the Director for Programme Management at the WHO Western Pacific Regional Office. She was previously named Special Envoy for Global Health Initiatives by the government of the Philippines in 2018.

== Filmography ==
=== Television ===
Year	Title	Role	Network
1969–1972	The World Tonight	Reporter	ABS-CBN
1970–1971	Apat na Sulok ng Daigdig	Host	ABS-CBN
1974–1975	Tipunang Bayan	Host	GMA Network
1975–present	Kapwa Ko Mahal Ko	Host	GMA Network
1980–1983	What's Up	Host	GMA Network
1980–1984	Lasang Pinoy	Host	GMA Network
1986–1987	Lunch Date	Host	GMA Network
1992–1994	Kontak 5	Host	ABC (now TV5)
2008–2009	RPN NewsWatch	Anchor	RPN
2019–2020	Early All Ready	Host	5 (now back to TV5)

=== Radio ===
Year	Title	Role	Station
1966–1968	Night Life	Disc Jockey	DZXX
1969–1971	Radyo Patrol	Anchor	DZAQ
1994–1995	Kambal Kamao	Anchor	DZRH
2013–2019	All Ready	Anchor	Radyo5 92.3 News FM (now 105.9 True FM)
2019–2020	Early All Ready	Co-anchor	Radyo5 92.3 News FM (now 105.9 True FM)

Business positions
Preceded by Mia Concio	President, Radio Philippines Network; 2008–2009	Succeeded by Tonypet Albano
