= Wolfgang Jilke =

Austrian general

Major General Wolfgang Jilke
- Born: 1949 (age 76–77) Innsbruck, Austria
- Allegiance: Austria

Major General Wolfgang Jilke (born in 1949 in Austria) served as Force Commander of the United Nations Disengagement Observer Force (UNDOF). He was appointed to this position by United Nations Secretary-General Ban Ki-moon in January 2007, succeeding Lieutenant General Bala Nanda Sharma of Nepal, who relinquished his post on 17 January 2007.

Prior to his appointment as Force Commander, Jilke served as a representative of Austria to the Military Committee of the European Union and in the Euro-Atlantic Partnership Council Military Committee of the North Atlantic Treaty Organization (NATO). Before that, in 2002, he served as Chief of the Office of the Austrian Federal Minister of Defence.

In 1971, General Jilke was commissioned into the army in Austria, where he held a number of positions in various capacities. From 1983 to 1986, he became a teacher at the Austrian War College. He became a member of the Royal Defence Studies in London in 1997 and in the following two years, he served as Commander of the Austrian International Peace Support Command.
