= Big News =

- Final titlecard of Big News in 2008
- Genre: News program Live action
- Created by: Associated Broadcasting Company
- Directed by: Rosario Andres
- Presented by: Cherie Mercado; various contributors
- Country of origin: Philippines
- Original languages: English (1962–72, 1992–2004); Filipino (2004–08)

Production
- Executive producers: Sonny Fernandez; Jackie Sierda
- Production locations: ABC 5 Studio B, Novaliches, Quezon City
- Running time: 30 minutes
- Production company: ABC News and Public Affairs

Original release
- Network: ABC 5
- Release: March 19, 1962 – September 22, 1972
- Release: February 24, 1992 – August 8, 2008

Big News was a Philippine television news broadcasting show broadcast by ABC. Originally anchored by Duds Rivera and Bong Lapira, it aired from March 19, 1962 to September 22, 1972. The show returned on February 24, 1992. The show concluded on August 8, 2008. Cherie Mercado served as the final anchor. It was replaced by Balita Ngayon in its timeslot.

== History ==
=== 1962–1972; First incarnation ===
The Big News was originally anchored by Duds Rivera and Bong Lapira with Antonio Tecson as head of the newsroom. Lapira later left the newscast in 1967 to transfer to ABS-CBN to anchor Newsbreak on DZXL-TV Channel 9 and he was replaced by Jose Mari Velez. The show first aired on March 19, 1962, and went off the air on September 22, 1972 due to martial law.

=== 1992–2004; Second incarnation ===
On February 24, 1992, three days after ABC returned to the airwaves, the program resumed its telecast, but this time, it was anchored by Tina Monzon-Palma. On September 14 of that year, she was joined by Eric Eloriaga and later Kathy Tanco-Ong on March 1, 1993. Tanco-Ong would later bow out of the newscast in 1997, Anthony Pangilinan joined the newscast as Tanco-Ong's co-anchor, replacing Eloriaga. On March 2, 1998, Janice Pronstoller and Thelma Dumpit-Murillo became the new anchors replacing Tanco-Ong, joining Pangilinan. Monzon-Palma went to become the anchor of ABS-CBN's late night newscast The World Tonight while Eloriaga became the anchor of RPN's NewsWatch, both newscast's main rivals during pre-Martial Law days.

On May 3, 1999, Pronstroller and Dumpit-Murillo were replaced by Amelyn Veloso, joining Pangilingan to the newscast.

On January 10, 2000, Rod Nepomuceno became Veloso's co-anchor, replacing Pangilingan. Nepomuceno was replaced by Atty. Mike Toledo on June 3, 2002.

=== 2004–2008; Big News ===
On April 12, 2004, when the network reformatted most of its programs, former ABS-CBN anchor Cherie Mercado, joining with Veloso as co-anchor and the newscast switched to Filipino in order to compete with the other networks' newscasts.

Title card used until September 2007

On October 2, 2006, the newscast exchanged timeslots with Sentro, the early-evening news program of the network.

On August 8, 2008, the program, together with Sentro aired its final broadcast and on the next day (August 9), the station was rebranded as TV5.

== Anchors ==
- Ernir Zarate (1962)
- Duds Rivera (1962–72)
- Bong Lapira (1962–67)
- Jose Mari Velez (1967–72)
- Tina Monzon-Palma (1992–97)
- Eric Eloriaga (1992–97)
- Kathy Tanco-Ong (1993–98)
- Anthony Pangilinan (1997–2000)
- Thelma Dumpit-Murillo (1998–99)
- Janice Pronstroller (1998–99)
- Amelyn Veloso (1999–2006)
- Rod Nepomuceno (2000–02)
- Atty. Mike Toledo (2002–04)
- Cherie Mercado (2004–08)

=== Substitute anchors ===
- Vivian Zalvidea
- Joseph Andres
- Jove Francisco
- Martin Andanar

== See also ==
- List of TV5 (Philippine TV network) original programming
- News5
- Pangunahing Balita
- Sentro
- Aksyon
- Frontline Pilipinas
- One Balita Pilipinas
- The Big Story
