= June Keithley =

Filipina actress and broadcast journalist (1947-2013)

June Keithley-Castro
- Born: June Emelie Keithley; March 10, 1947; Manila, Philippines
- Died: November 24, 2013 (aged 66); Quezon City, Metro Manila, Philippines
- Resting place: Loyola Memorial Park, Marikina, Metro Manila, Philippines
- Occupation: Broadcaster
- Spouse: Angelo Castro Jr. (m. 1973; died 2012)
- Children: 3, including Diego

June Emelie Keithley-Castro (March 10, 1947 – November 24, 2013) was a Filipina actress and broadcast journalist.

== Early life ==
Castro was born to a Filipina mother from Cebu and an American father. She studied at St. Paul College in Manila, where she was mentored by James B. Reuter. She married broadcaster Angelo Castro Jr. in 1973 and the couple had three children: Diego, an actor and anchor of UNTV, Gabriella, and Angelica.

=== Acting career ===
Prior to becoming a journalist, Castro had a television and film career. She was part of the cast in the ABS-CBN sketch comedy show Super Laff-In from 1969 until 1972. She appeared in several films, including Durog (1971), and Lunes, Martes, Miyerkules, Huwebes, Biyernes, Sabado, Linggo (1976).

== People Power Revolution ==
During the People Power Revolution in late February 1986, Keithley continued her broadcasts at the radio station booth of DZRJ-AM in Santa Mesa, Manila where she, along with Father James Reuter, Felino Interia, and Charlie Frejas, set up Radyo Bandido, which was an alternative source for news on the uprising after government troops destroyed the transmitter of Church-owned Radio Veritas on 23 February. As soldiers failed to discover their whereabouts despite proximity to Malacañang Palace, Radyo Bandido helped sustain momentum for the revolt that ultimately toppled the dictatorship of President Ferdinand Marcos on 25 February.

== Illness and death ==
In 2009, Castro was diagnosed with breast cancer and told she had three years to live. She died, aged 66, on November 24, 2013, at St. Luke's Medical Center, Quezon City, Metro Manila.

Presidential spokesperson Edwin Lacierda announced her death on Philippine television. Her wake was held at Saint Ignatius of Loyola Military Cathedral inside Camp Aguinaldo.

== Affiliations ==
Castro hosted a religious program called "The Woman Clothed with the Sun".

== Awards ==
President Corazon Aquino conferred Castro with the Philippine Legion of Honor, making her a reservist in the Armed Forces of the Philippines with the rank of general.

In 2013, she and Reuter were given a plaque of recognition and the Spirit of EDSA Award at the 27th anniversary of the People Power Revolution.

== In popular culture ==
Keithley was portrayed by Odette Khan in the 1988 Australian television film A Dangerous Life, in a scene depicting her role in Radyo Bandido during the People Power Revolution.
