= Angelo Castro Jr. =

Filipino journalist (1945–2012)

- Angelo Castro Jr. in an episode of The World Tonight in the late 1980s
- Born: Angelo Ylagan Castro Jr. March 6, 1945; Philippines
- Died: April 5, 2012 (aged 67); Quezon City, Philippines
- Resting place: Loyola Memorial Park Marikina, Philippines
- Other names: ACJ, AC, OA
- Occupation: Broadcaster
- Known for: The World Tonight
- Spouse: June Keithley (m. 1973)
- Children: 3, including Diego
- Relatives: Kenneth Ilagan (nephew); Rico Yan (nephew); Mondo Castro (nephew)

Angelo Ylagan Castro Jr. (March 6, 1945 – April 5, 2012) was a Filipino broadcast journalist and actor. He was a news anchor for The World Tonight, the flagship news program of ABS-CBN and ANC. He anchored several ABS-CBN and ANC news and current events programs for the past 25 years. Castro is a recipient of the Ka Doroy Broadcaster of the Year award from the Kapisanan ng mga Brodkaster ng Pilipinas.

Castro died at age 67 after succumbing to lung cancer.

== Early life and career ==
Castro studied at the University of the Philippines, where he joined the Upsilon Sigma Phi.

=== Acting career ===
Before becoming a journalist, Castro had a flourishing television and film career. He was cast as Bong in Baltic and Co., broadcast over the GMA-7 network during the mid-1970s. He also voiced the character of Captain James Errol in the animated adaption of Little Lord Fauntleroy, locally known as Cedie, Ang Munting Principe, in 1992.

Castro was nominated in the 1982 FAMAS Awards as Best Supporting Actor for Kumander Alibasbas.

=== Broadcasting ===
Castro joined ABS-CBN when it reopened in 1986 after the EDSA Revolution and became its news manager. He created TV Patrol, the longest-running Filipino newscast. Castro anchored The World Tonight in 1986 with Loren Legarda.

In 2000, Castro became ABS-CBN's senior vice-president for news and current affairs. He left that post a year later but continued to anchor The World Tonight. He also hosted the travel show Las Islas Filipinas on ANC.

Castro retired in September 2009, but returned as news anchor on The World Tonight in November 2011. He was joined by Tina Monzon-Palma and Teddyboy Locsin. He finally left the show for the last time when his health continued to deteriorate.

== Personal life ==
He was the son of Angelo Castro Sr, a broadcaster, former Philippine Information attaché to San Francisco, and former Press Undersecretary. He was married to fellow actress-broadcaster June Keithley in 1973, and was the father of actor-broadcaster Diego Castro III, Gabriella, and Angelica. Castro was also the uncle of musicians Kenneth Ilagan and Mondo Castro, and actor Rico Yan.

=== Health and death ===
In 2008, he was diagnosed with lung cancer and given three months to live. Castro outlived this prognosis by three years, dying on April 5, 2012, a month after his 67th birthday, at St. Luke's Medical Center, Quezon City.

Aftermath

Presidential spokesperson Edwin Lacierda said after it was announced that Castro had died:

We mourn the passing of Angelo Castro Jr. For many years he was a calm and reassuring presence in the late evening news. His passing marks the closing of an era of gentlemanly broadcasting, where erudition and dignity were the hallmarks of news and current affairs.

== Awards and nominations ==
- 1982 Nominee, FAMAS Award for Best Supporting Actor for Kumander Alibasbas (1981)

Media offices
Preceded by Office re-established	SVP for News and Current Affairs, ABS-CBN News (first stint); 1986–1990	Succeeded by Rodolfo Reyes
Preceded by Rodolfo Reyes	SVP for News and Current Affairs, ABS-CBN News (second stint); 1992–1993	Succeeded by Rodolfo Reyes
Preceded by Dong Puno	SVP for News and Current Affairs, ABS-CBN News (third stint); 2000–2001	Succeeded by Dong Puno
