= Jose Mari Velez =

Filipino television newscaster

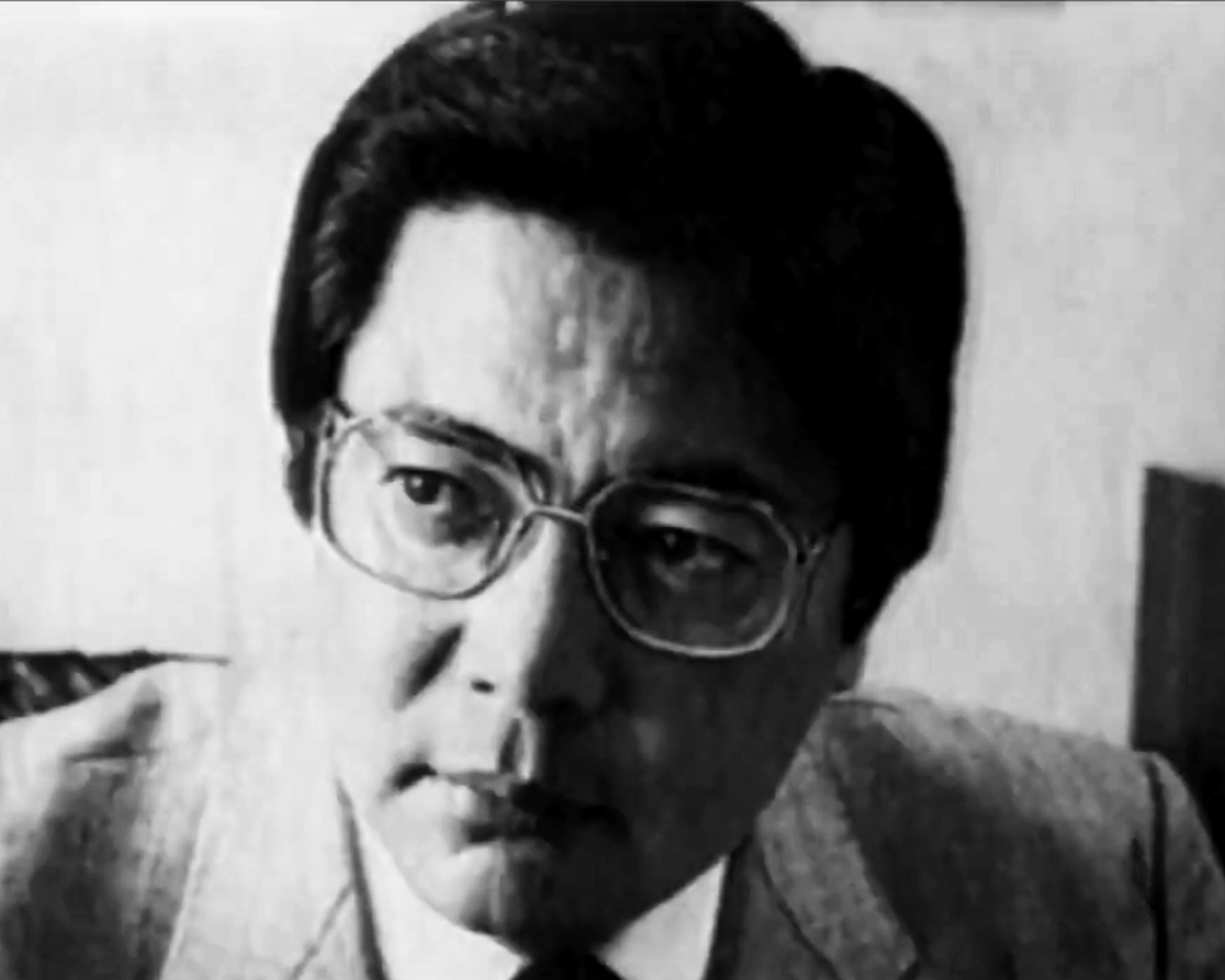
- Born: José Mari Uhler Vélez; May 27, 1942; Manila, Commonwealth of the Philippines
- Died: June 3, 1991 (aged 49); New York City, New York, United States
- Education: University of the Philippines Diliman, Center for Research and Communication
- Occupations: Lawyer, Journalist, Business Executive
- Awards: Honored at the Bantayog ng mga Bayani wall of remembrance

José Mari Uhler Vélez (May 27, 1942 – June 3, 1991) was a Filipino lawyer, journalist, business executive, and activist best remembered for his long career as television newscaster anchoring The Big News on ABC 5 (now TV5) from March 1967 to September 22, 1972. He was a former TV host on a public affairs program called The Weekend with Velez, later renamed as Velez This Week, and also a former news anchor on GMA Headline News, aired both on GMA Network and both produced by GMA News & Public Affairs (now GMA Integrated News & GMA Public Affairs) and for his service as an oppositionist delegate to the Philippine Constitutional Convention of 1971. He was one of the opposition delegates at the convention, which was why he was one of the first to be arrested when Ferdinand Marcos declared Martial law in September 1972. In April 1989, three years after Marcos was ousted from power and exiled, Velez became one of the first recipients of the Ninoy Aquino Fellowship Award for his accomplishments in journalism, with President Corazon Aquino stating that she believes he "share[s] in Ninoy's vision of preserving and strengthening our democracy."

== Death ==
Vélez died on June 3, 1991, at Mt. Sinai Hospital in New York City after battling lung cancer.

== Personal life ==
He was a graduate of the University of the Philippines Diliman and of the Center for Research and Communication, which eventually evolved into the University of Asia and the Pacific.
