= Harry Gasser =

Philippine news presenter (1936–2014)

- Born: Harry Alesna Gasser; 1937; Carcar, Cebu, Philippine Commonwealth
- Died: April 3, 2014 (aged 76–77); Quezon City, Metro Manila, Philippines
- Occupation: Newscaster
- Spouse: Flora Gasser
- Children: 2

Harry Alesna Gasser (1937 – April 3, 2014) was a Philippine news presenter. Gasser was the face of Philippine evening news at the time of the regime of Ferdinand Marcos.

== Career ==
Gasser was an anchor of Balita Ngayon on ABS-CBN from 1969 to 1972. Following the closure of the network during Martial Law, Gasser transferred to BBC-2 where he anchored BBC Primetime News from 1973 to 1976. He was the main anchor of RPN's NewsWatch from 1976 to 1997. He also worked with Radio Veritas as news manager and later moved on to ABS-CBN to anchor TV Patrol in Cebu City from 1998-2001.

- NewsWatch Evening Cast, the first English-language early evening newscast was anchored by Gasser, together with Loren Legarda and Pat Lazaro, then later it was anchored by Cielo Villaluna and Cristina Peczon, and later with Marigold Haber.
- NewsWatch Prime Cast, a late night edition was also anchored by Gasser, Cathy Santillan, and later, Eric Eloriaga.

He was also overseas program manager and news manager of Radio Veritas.

== Personal life ==
Gasser was born in 1937 in Carcar.

He was married to veteran comedian Flora Gasser. They had two children. Loren Legarda, who co-anchored NewsWatch with Gasser on RPN, noted that "he was a proud Cebuano."

== Filmography ==
- Paalam... Bukas ang kasal ko (Goodbye ... Tomorrow is my wedding) (1986)
- Sa mata ng balita': 50 taong pamamahayag sa telebisyon (In the eyes of the news: 50 years of journalism on television) (2003)

== Awards ==
- Lifetime Achievement award given by the Philippine Movie Press Club
