= List of roles and awards of Rufa Mae Quinto =

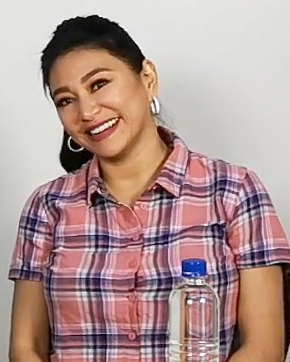
Quinto in 2018

Filipino actress Rufa Mae Quinto has received a selection of accolades for her work in film and television. She began her career as a teenager and auditioned for the variety show That's Entertainment in 1994. In the following years, Quinto started playing a number bit and supporting roles and eventually signed with Viva Entertainment. She had her breakthrough role as a laundrywoman in the comedy Gloria, Gloria Labandera (1997).

In 1999, Quinto played as a comic friend of Regine Velasquez's character in the romantic comedy Dahil May Isang Ikaw, for which she won the Star Award for Movie Supporting Actress of the Year. That same year, she was cast in the sketch comedy show Ispup, for which she won the Star Award for Best Comedy Actress. She rose to stardom after she played as a bumbling secret agent in the comedy Booba (2001). Her profile increased with leading roles the following year. Quinto played the titular role in the superhero film Super B, for which she was nominated for a Manila Film Festival for Best Actress. Later that year, she starred as a psychic in the action comedy Hula Mo, Huli Ko opposite Rudy Fernandez, for which she earned a nomination for Best Actress at the 28th Metro Manila Film Festival.

Quinto also became prominent in situational comedies. In 2004, she won her first Golden Screen Award for Outstanding Lead Actress in a Comedy Series for her role in Idol Ko si Kap. Her performances in Bubble Gang (2005, 2008, 2009, 2012 to 2016), Hokus Pokus! (2006) and Home Sweetie Home (2018) earned her the Star Award for Best Comedy Actress, an overall record of ten wins in the category. Her role as a mistress in the comedy drama Ako Legal Wife: Mano Po 4?, (2005) garnered her nominations for the FAMAS Award for Best Actress and the Star Award for Movie Supporting Actress of the Year. Quinto's performances in the romantic dramas La Visa Loca (2005) and Joey Gosiengfiao's Temptation Island (2011) earned her nominations for the Golden Screen Award for Best Performance by an Actress in a Leading Role (Musical or Comedy).

== Filmography ==
=== Film ===
Key
†	Denotes films that have not yet been released

Rufa Mae Quinto's film credits with year of release, film titles and roles
Year	Title	Role	Notes	Ref.
1994	Kalabog en Bosyo	Guest in Disco Club		
1995	Love Notes	Chula		
1995	I Love You Sabado	Staff member		
1995	Bangers	Dorie's friend		
1995	The Grepor Butch Belgica Story	Shirley		
1995	Manalo Matalo Mahal Kita	Jessica		
1995	Ang Tipo Kong Lalake (Maginoo pero Medyo Bastos)	Dormitory boarder		
1995	Indecent Professor	Student		
1996	Dyesebel	Mermaid		
1996	Ang Pinakamagandang Hayop sa Balat ng Lupa	Pulo's wife		
1996	April Boys: Sana'y Mahalin Mo Rin Ako	Hostess		
1996	Paracale Gang	Carmen		
1996	Hindi Ako Ander (Itanong Mo kay Kumander)	Bella		
1996	Papunta Ka Pa Lang, Pabalik na Ako	Rape victim		
1996	Mumbaki	Student		
1996	Pipti-Pipti: 1 Por U, 2 Por Me	Woman in Leo's fantasy		
1997	Anak ni Boy Negro	G		
1997	Si Mokong, si Astig, at si Gamol	May		
1997	Matinik na Bading, Mga Syokeng Buking	Reesa		
1997	Bobby Barbers: Parak	Mildred		
1997	Pablik Enemi 1 n 2: Aksidental Heroes	Maria		
1997	Gloria, Gloria Labandera	Gloria		
1997	Kool Ka Lang	Karen Hipolito		
1997	Habang Nasasaktan Lalong Tumatapang	Milagros		
1997	Magkapalad...	Chona		
1998	Squala	Kinky		
1998	Ang Erpat kong Astig	Carla		
1999	Sumigaw Ka Hanggang Gusto Mo	Alice		
1999	Bayadra Brothers			
1999	Dahil May Isang Ikaw			
1999	Bullet			
1999	Asin at Paminta			
1999	Ako ang Lalagot sa Hininga Mo	Rosario		
2000	Mana-mana, Tiba-tiba	Atty. Katrina Puno		
2000	Kailangan ko'y Ikaw	Lovely		
2001	Booba	Booba		
2001	Baliktaran: Si Ace at si Daisy	Ace		
2001	Pangako... Ikaw Lang	Peachy		
2001	Radyo	Mila		
2001	Pagdating ng Panahon	Bubut		
2002	Mahal Kita, Final Answer	Joanna		
2002	Super B	Bilma		
2002	Hula Mo, Huli Ko	Paula		
2003	A.B. Normal College: Todo Na 'Yan! Kulang Pa 'Yun!	Miss Yulo		
2003	Mars Ravelo's Captain Barbell	Freezy / Roselle		
2004	Masikip sa Dibdib: The Boobita Rose Story	Boobita		
2005	La Visa Loca	Mara		
2005	D' Anothers			
2005	Ako Legal Wife: Mano Po 4?	Gloria		
2006	Oh, My Ghost!	Trixie		
2007	Apat Dapat, Dapat Apat: Friends 4 Lyf and Death	Maria Liwanag 'Brite' Diliman		
2007	Pasukob	Jennifer "Jenny" Rose San Miguel		
2007	Desperadas	Patricia		
2008	Desperadas 2	Dr. Patricia Llanes		
2008	Manay Po 2: Overload	Bette		
2008	Oh, My Girl! A Laugh Story...	Mayette		
2008	I.T.A.L.Y. (I Trust and Love You)	Stella Sembrano		
2009	Status: Single	Doris		
2009	Kimmy Dora: Kambal sa Kiyeme	Waitress		
2009	Wapakman	Magda Memeses		
2010	Si Agimat at si Enteng Kabisote	Girl in the dressing room		
2011	Joey Gosiengfiao's Temptation Island	Nympha		
2013	Ang Huling Henya	Miri/Henya		
2014	My Big Bossing	Fairy Kapangyarihan	"Prinsesa" segment	
2018	Nakalimutan Ko Nang Kalimutan Ka	Clinic patient		
2018	Bagyong Bheverlynn	Bheverlynn		
2018	Mary, Marry Me	Wedding Client		
2019	And Ai, Thank You!	Ursula de Vila		
2019	Love Is Love	Rofa		
2022	My Teacher	Golda		
2024	Mujigae			
2025	My Love Will Make You Disappear	Madame Tala		
TBA	Booba 2 †			

=== Television ===
Key
†	Denotes shows that have not yet been aired

Rufa Mae Quinto's television credits with year of release, title(s) and role
Year	Title	Role	Notes	Ref(s).
1994	That's Entertainment	Herself		
1994	Ober Da Bakod	Pegassu		
1994	Actually, Yun Na!	Herself (guest)		
1994	Buddy en Sol			
1994	Chibugan Na!	Herself / Guest		
1996	Super Laff-In	Herself		
1997	Mixed N.U.T.S.	Herself		
1997	Anna Karenina	Chona		
1998	Instant Dyakpat	Herself / Host		
1998	Tropang Trumpo	Herself		
1998	Kool Ka Lang	Booba		
1999	Mikee Forever			
1999	Ispup	Herself		
2000	Arriba, Arriba!	Jennifer Lapis		
2000	Subic Bay			
2000	Idol Ko si Kap	Vivian		
2001–2016	Bubble Gang	Herself		
2001	MMK: U.S. Visa			
2002	Ang Iibigin ay Ikaw	Liberty / Libay		
2003	MPK: Rochelle Panglinan Story	Rochelle		
2004	Magpakailanman	Giovannie Pico	Episode: "The Giovannie Pico Story"	
2004	Marinara	Marie / Dolphina / Aira		
2005	Hokus Pokus	Candy		
2006	Captain Barbell	Ms. Patti / Ms. Aero / Aerobika		
2007	Showbiz Central	Host		
2007	Marimar	Fifi		
2007	Whammy! Push Your Luck	Host		
2007	MPK: Analyn Villanueva	Analyn		
2008	Dyesebel	Amafura		
2009	Darna	Francesca Gandanghari		
2009	SRO Cinemaserye	Perseveranda	Episode: "Moshi-Moshi... I Love You"	
2010	Diva	Lady Mendoza		
2010	Kaya ng Powers	Margaret Powers		
2011	Dwarfina	Duwenkikay		
2011	Daldalita	Cherry		
2012	Wil Time Bigtime	Co-host		
2012	Enchanted Garden	Diwani Quassia / Madonna		
2013	Toda Max	Wei Da		
2013	Vampire ang Daddy Ko	Mae		
2013	Wowowillie	Co-host		
2013	Positive	Maricris		
2014	Wagas	Rebecca Bustamante	Episode: "Rebecca & Richard Love Story"	
2015	Wagas	Mystica	Episode: "Mystica & Troy Love Story"	
2015	Mac and Chiz	Chenelyn		
2017	Ipaglaban Mo!	Angie	Episode: "Akala"	
2017	Wansapanataym	Tita Florita Miraflores	Episode: "Jasmine's Flower Powers"	
2017	Home Sweetie Home	Lia Meneses		
2018	Maalaala Mo Kaya	Vivian	Episode: "Laptop"	
2018	Kalye Wars	Kap Pip		
2019	Jhon En Martian	Queen 222		
2019	Hinahanap-Hanap Kita	Plane passenger	Episode: "The Reunion"	
2021	Daddy's Gurl	Joy Dibdiban	Guest	
2022	TOLS	Barbie Macaspac		
2022	Tadhana	Joan	Episode: "Sikreto"	
2022	Daig Kayo ng Lola Ko	Queenie	Episode: "Bida Kontrabida"	
2022	Regal Studio Presents	Britney	Episode: "Super Besh"	
2022	Magpakailanman	Tess Bomb	Episode: "Laughter & Tears"	
2022	Pepito Manaloto	Mikaela "Mek-Mek" Kho	Guest	
2023	Comedy Island Philippines	Herself		
2023	Sparkle U	Emilia Gaspar	Episode: "#Ghosted"	
2024	Makiling	Grace		
2024	LOL: Last One Laughing Philippines	Contestant		
2025	Politiko Talks	Co-host		
2025–2026	Your Face Sounds Familiar season 4	Contestant		
2026	Viva One Originals: Ashtine	Episode: "Who's the Boss?"		
2026	Tiktalk			

=== Microdrama ===
Year	Title	Role
2026	Aura de Peligro	Aura

== Discography ==
=== Studio albums ===
Title	Album details	Ref(s).
Rated R	Released: 2001; Label: Viva Records; Format: LP, cassette, CD	

== Awards and nominations ==
=== Major associations ===
Awards and nominations received by Rufa Mae Quinto
Award (Note: Awards, festivals, honors and other miscellaneous organizations are listed in alphabetical order.)	Year (Note: Indicates the year of ceremony. Each year is linked to the article about the awards held that year, wherever possible.)	Recipient(s)	Category	Result	Ref.
FAMAS Award	2006	Ako Legal Wife: Mano Po 4?	Best Actress	Nominated	
Film Development Council of the Philippines: Sine Sandaan	2019	Rufa Mae Quinto	Comedy Female	Included	
Golden Screen Awards	2004	Idol Ko si Kap	Outstanding Lead Actress in a Comedy Series	Won	
Golden Screen Awards	2005	Idol Ko si Kap	Outstanding Lead Actress in a Comedy Series	Nominated	
Golden Screen Awards	2005	Bubble Gang	Outstanding Performance in a Comedy Gag Show	Nominated	
Golden Screen Awards	2006	La Visa Loca	Best Performance by an Actress in a Leading Role (Musical or Comedy)	Nominated	
Golden Screen Awards	2012	Temptation Island	Best Performance by an Actress in a Leading Role (Musical or Comedy)	Nominated	
KBP Golden Dove Awards	1999	Ispup	Best Comedy Actress	Won	
Manila Film Festival	2002	Super B	Best Actress	Nominated	
Metro Manila Film Festival	2002	Hula Mo, Huli Ko	Best Actress	Nominated	
Star Awards for Movies	2000	Dahil May Isang Ikaw	Movie Supporting Actress of the Year	Won	
Star Awards for Movies	2006	Ako Legal Wife: Mano Po 4?	Movie Supporting Actress of the Year	Nominated	
Star Awards for Television	2000	Ispup	Best Comedy Actress	Won	
Star Awards for Television	2002	Rufa Mae Quinto	Face of the Night	Won	
Star Awards for Television	2003	Bubble Gang	Best Comedy Actress	Nominated	
Star Awards for Television	2004	Bubble Gang	Best Comedy Actress	Nominated	
Star Awards for Television	2005	Bubble Gang	Best Comedy Actress	Won	
Star Awards for Television	2006	Hokus Pokus	Best Comedy Actress	Won	
Star Awards for Television	2008	Showbiz Central	Best Female Showbiz-Oriented Show Host	Nominated	
Star Awards for Television	2008	Rufa Mae Quinto	Female Star of the Night	Won	
Star Awards for Television	2008	Bubble Gang	Best Comedy Actress	Won	
Star Awards for Television	2009	Bubble Gang	Best Comedy Actress	Won	
Star Awards for Television	2012	Bubble Gang	Best Comedy Actress	Won	
Star Awards for Television	2013	Bubble Gang	Best Comedy Actress	Won	
Star Awards for Television	2014	Bubble Gang	Best Comedy Actress	Won	
Star Awards for Television	2015	Bubble Gang	Best Comedy Actress	Won	
Star Awards for Television	2016	Bubble Gang	Best Comedy Actress	Nominated	
Star Awards for Television	2018	Home Sweetie Home	Best Comedy Actress	Won	

=== Minor associations ===
Award	Year	Recipient(s)	Category	Result	Ref.
Comguild Academes Choice Awards	2019	Rufa Mae Quinto	Most Admired Comedienne of the Year	Won	
EdukCircle Awards	2018	Rufa Mae Quinto	Best in Comedy (Female)	Nominated	
