= PMPC Star Award for Best Comedy Actor and Actress =

Philippine Television Award

The PMPC Star Award for Best Comedy Actor and the PMPC Star Award for Best Comedy Actress are given to the best actors and actresses, respectively, in a Philippine television comedy of the year.

== Best Comedy Actor winners and nominations ==
=== 1980s ===
Year	Actor	Program	Network
1987 (1st)	Dolphy	John en Marsha	RPN
1988 (2nd)	Jaime Fabregas	Sic O'Clock News	IBC
1988 (2nd)	Joey de Leon	T.O.D.A.S.: Totally Outrageous Delightful All-Star Show	IBC
1988 (2nd)	Dolphy	John en Marsha	RPN
1988 (2nd)	Joey Marquez	Palibhasa Lalake	ABS-CBN
1988 (2nd)	Roderick Paulate	Tipitipitim Tipitom	RPN
1988 (2nd)	Vic Sotto	Okay Ka Fairy Ko	IBC
1988 (2nd)	Lou Veloso	Pubhouse	IBC
1989 (3rd)	Jay Ilagan	Goin' Bananas	ABS-CBN

=== 1990s ===
Year	Actor	Program	Network
1990 (4th)	Vic Sotto	Okay Ka Fairy Ko	ABS-CBN
1991 (5th)	Redford White	Buddy en Sol	RPN
1991 (5th)	Roderick Paulate	Abangan Ang Susunod Na Kabanata	ABS-CBN
1991 (5th)	Vic Sotto	Okay Ka Fairy Ko	ABS-CBN
1991 (5th)	Jun Urbano	It Bulinggit	ABS-CBN
1991 (5th)	Anjo Yllana	Abangan Ang Susunod Na Kabanata	ABS-CBN
1992 (6th)	Anjo Yllana	Abangan Ang Susunod Na Kabanata	ABS-CBN
1992 (6th)	Jaime Fabregas	Mana Mana	ABS-CBN
1992 (6th)	Roderick Paulate	Abangan Ang Susunod Na Kabanata	ABS-CBN
1992 (6th)	Vic Sotto	Okay Ka Fairy Ko	ABS-CBN
1992 (6th)	Dennis Padilla	Mag-Asawa'y Di Biro	RPN
1992 (6th)	Redford White	Buddy en Sol	RPN
1993 (7th)	Dolphy	Home Along Da Riles	ABS-CBN
1994 (8th)	Dolphy	Home Along Da Riles	ABS-CBN
1995 (9th)	Dolphy	Home Along Da Riles	ABS-CBN
1996 (10th)	Michael V.	Bubble Gang	GMA
1997 (11th)	Michael V.	Bubble Gang	GMA
1998 (12th)	Michael V.	Bubble Gang	GMA
1999 (13th)	Michael V.	Bubble Gang	GMA

=== 2000s ===
Year	Actor	Program	Network
2000 (14th)	Michael V.	Bubble Gang	GMA
2001 (15th)	Bong Revilla	Idol Ko Si Kap	GMA
2002 (16th)	Ogie Alcasid	Bubble Gang	GMA
2002 (16th)	Michael V.	Bubble Gang	GMA
2003 (17th)	Vic Sotto	Daddy Di Do Du	GMA
2003 (17th)	Ogie Alcasid	Bubble Gang	GMA
2003 (17th)	Joey de Leon	Beh Bote Nga	GMA
2003 (17th)	Edu Manzano	OK Fine, 'To Ang Gusto Nyo!	ABS-CBN
2003 (17th)	Michael V.	Bubble Gang	GMA
2004 (18th)	Ogie Alcasid	Bubble Gang	GMA
2004 (18th)	Joey de Leon	Nuts Entertainment	GMA
2004 (18th)	Edu Manzano	OK Fine, 'To Ang Gusto Nyo!	ABS-CBN
2004 (18th)	Vhong Navarro	Bida si Mister, Bida si Misis	ABS-CBN
2004 (18th)	Vic Sotto	Daddy Di Do Du	GMA
2004 (18th)	Michael V.	Bubble Gang	GMA
2005 (19th)	Keempee de Leon	Bahay Mo Ba 'To?	GMA
2006 (20th)	Ogie Alcasid	Bubble Gang	GMA
2006 (20th)	Joey de Leon	Nuts Entertainment	GMA
2006 (20th)	Keempee de Leon	Bahay Mo Ba 'To?	GMA
2006 (20th)	Dolphy	Quizon Avenue	ABS-CBN
2006 (20th)	Edu Manzano	OK Fine, 'To Ang Gusto Nyo!	ABS-CBN
2006 (20th)	Roderick Paulate	Bora	ABS-CBN
2006 (20th)	Vic Sotto	Daddy Di Do Du	GMA
2006 (20th)	Michael V.	Bitoy's Funniest Videos	GMA
2006 (20th)	Ronaldo Valdez	Bahay Mo Ba 'To?	GMA
2007 (21st)	Ogie Alcasid	Bubble Gang	GMA
2007 (21st)	Keempee de Leon	Bahay Mo Ba 'To?	GMA
2007 (21st)	Joey De Leon	Nuts Entertainment	GMA
2007 (21st)	Vic Sotto	Ful Haus	GMA
2007 (21st)	Michael V.	Bubble Gang	GMA
2008 (22nd)	Ogie Alcasid	Bubble Gang	GMA
2008 (22nd)	Joey De Leon	Nuts Entertainment	GMA
2008 (22nd)	Roderick Paulate	That's My Doc	ABS-CBN
2008 (22nd)	Vic Sotto	Ful Haus	GMA
2008 (22nd)	Michael V.	Bubble Gang	GMA
2008 (22nd)	Redford White	Kokey	ABS-CBN
2009 (23rd)	Pooh	Banana Split	ABS-CBN
2009 (23rd)	Ogie Alcasid	Bubble Gang	GMA
2009 (23rd)	Joey de Leon	Nuts Entertainment	GMA
2009 (23rd)	Jayson Gainza	Banana Split	ABS-CBN
2009 (23rd)	Vic Sotto	Ful Haus	GMA
2009 (23rd)	Michael V.	Bubble Gang	GMA

=== 2010s ===
2010: Ogie Alcasid (Bubble Gang / GMA 7)

2011: Ogie Alcasid (Bubble Gang / GMA 7)

2012: Robin Padilla (Toda Max / ABS-CBN 2)

2013: Michael V. (Bubble Gang / GMA 7)

2014: Sef Cadayona (Bubble Gang / GMA 7)

2015: Jayson Gainza (Banana Split: Extra Scoop / ABS-CBN 2)

2016: Jose Manalo (Hay Bahay / GMA 7)

2017: Jobert Austria (Banana Sundae / ABS-CBN 2)

2018: Ogie Alcasid (Home Sweetie Home / ABS-CBN 2)

2019: Bayani Agbayani (Home Sweetie Home: Extra Sweet / ABS-CBN 2)

=== 2020s ===
2020: Vic Sotto (Daddy's Gurl / GMA 7)

2021: Paolo Contis (Bubble Gang / GMA 7)

2023: Paolo Contis (Bubble Gang / GMA 7)

2024: Roderick Paulate (Da Pers Family / TV5)

==== Multiple awards ====
Actor	Record Set
Ogie Alcasid	8
Michael V.	7
Dolphy	4
Vic Sotto	3
Paolo Contis	2

== Best Comedy Actress winners and nominations ==
=== 1980s ===
Year	Actor	Program	Network
1987 (1st)	Nova Villa	Chika Chika Chiks	ABS-CBN
1988 (2nd)	Gloria Romero	Palibhasa Lalake	ABS-CBN
1988 (2nd)	Nida Blanca	John en Marsha	RPN
1988 (2nd)	Vangie Labalan	Ayos Lang, Tsong!	IBC
1988 (2nd)	Cynthia Patag	Palibhasa Lalake	ABS-CBN
1988 (2nd)	Tiya Pusit	Eh, Kasi Babae	IBC
1988 (2nd)	Chanda Romero	Pubhouse	IBC
1988 (2nd)	Aiza Seguerra	Okay Ka Fairy Ko	IBC
1988 (2nd)	Nova Villa	Chika Chika Chicks	ABS-CBN
1989 (3rd)	Nida Blanca	John en Marsha	RPN

=== 1990s ===
Year	Actor	Program	Network
1990 (4th)	Caridad Sanchez	Family 3+1	GMA
1990 (4th)	Cynthia Patag	Palibhasa Lalake	ABS-CBN
1991 (5th)	Nova Villa	Abangan Ang Susunod Na Kabanata	ABS-CBN
1991 (5th)	Ruby Rodriguez	Okay Ka Fairy Ko	ABS-CBN
1991 (5th)	Gloria Romero	Palibhasa Lalake	ABS-CBN
1991 (5th)	Charito Solis	Okay Ka Fairy Ko	ABS-CBN
1991 (5th)	Tessie Tomas	Abangan Ang Susunod Na Kabanata	ABS-CBN
1992 (6th)	Caridad Sanchez	Family 3+1	GMA
1992 (6th)	Flora Gasser	Mag-Asawa'y Di Biro	RPN
1992 (6th)	Carmi Martin	Abangan Ang Susunod Na Kabanata	ABS-CBN
1992 (6th)	Cynthia Patag	Palibhasa Lalake	ABS-CBN
1992 (6th)	Tessie Tomas	Abangan Ang Susunod Na Kabanata	ABS-CBN
1992 (6th)	Nova Villa	Abangan Ang Susunod Na Kabanata	ABS-CBN
1993 (7th)	Maricel Laxa	A.T.M.	RPN
1994 (8th)	Nova Villa	Abangan Ang Susunod Na Kabanata	ABS-CBN
1995 (9th)	Nova Villa	Home Along Da Riles	ABS-CBN
1996 (10th)	Malou de Guzman	Ober Da Bakod	GMA
1997 (11th)	Rosanna Roces	1 for 3	GMA
1998 (12th)	Ai-Ai delas Alas	Ibang Klase	GMA
1999 (13th)	Ai-Ai delas Alas	1 for 3	GMA

=== 2000s ===
Year	Actor	Program	Network
2000 (14th)	Rufa Mae Quinto	Ispup	ABC
2001 (15th)	Ai-Ai delas Alas	1 For 3	GMA
2002 (16th)	Ai-Ai delas Alas	Whattamen	ABS-CBN
2003 (17th)	Ai-Ai delas Alas	Whattamen	ABS-CBN
2003 (17th)	Alma Moreno	Daboy en Da Girl	GMA
2003 (17th)	Rufa Mae Quinto	Bubble Gang	GMA
2003 (17th)	Maricel Soriano	Bida si Mister, Bida si Misis	ABS-CBN
2003 (17th)	Nova Villa	Home Along Da Riles	ABS-CBN
2004 (18th)	Ai-Ai delas Alas	Ang Tanging Ina	ABS-CBN
2004 (18th)	Ethel Booba	All Together Now	GMA
2004 (18th)	Toni Gonzaga	Lagot Ka, Isusumbong Kita	GMA
2004 (18th)	Rufa Mae Quinto	Bubble Gang	GMA
2004 (18th)	Maricel Soriano	Bida si Mister, Bida si Misis	ABS-CBN
2004 (18th)	Nova Villa	Home Along Da Airport	ABS-CBN
2005 (19th)	Rufa Mae Quinto	Bubble Gang	GMA
2006 (20th)	Rufa Mae Quinto	Hokus Pokus	GMA
2006 (20th)	K Brosas	Hokus Pokus	GMA
2006 (20th)	Ai-Ai de las Alas	My Juan and Only	ABS-CBN
2006 (20th)	Toni Gonzaga	Wazzup Wazzup	Studio 23
2006 (20th)	Ara Mina	Bubble Gang	GMA
2006 (20th)	Pokwang	Quizon Avenue	ABS-CBN
2006 (20th)	Tiya Pusit	Bahay Mo Ba 'To?	GMA
2006 (20th)	Gloria Romero	OK Fine, 'To Ang Gusto Nyo!	ABS-CBN
2007 (21st)	Pokwang	Aalog-Alog	ABS-CBN
2007 (21st)	Tiya Pusit	Bahay Mo Ba 'To?	GMA
2007 (21st)	Toni Gonzaga	Wazzup Wazzup	Studio 23
2007 (21st)	Julia Lopez	Who's Your Daddy Now?	GMA
2007 (21st)	Maricel Soriano	John en Shirley	ABS-CBN
2008 (22nd)	Rufa Mae Quinto	Bubble Gang	GMA
2008 (22nd)	Ai-Ai delas Alas	Volta	ABS-CBN
2008 (22nd)	Pokwang	That's My Doc	ABS-CBN
2008 (22nd)	Susan Roces	John en Shirley	ABS-CBN
2008 (22nd)	Sharlene San Pedro	Goin' Bulilit	ABS-CBN
2008 (22nd)	Maricel Soriano	John en Shirley	ABS-CBN
2008 (22nd)	Nova Villa	That's My Doc	ABS-CBN
2009 (23rd)	Rufa Mae Quinto	Bubble Gang	GMA
2009 (23rd)	Eugene Domingo	Everybody Hapi	TV5
2009 (23rd)	Alex Gonzaga	Everybody Hapi	TV5
2009 (23rd)	Angelica Panganiban	Banana Split	ABS-CBN
2009 (23rd)	Pokwang	Banana Split	ABS-CBN
2009 (23rd)	Sharlene San Pedro	Goin' Bulilit	ABS-CBN

=== 2010s ===
2010: Angelica Panganiban (Banana Split / ABS-CBN 2)

2011: Ai-Ai delas Alas (M3: Malay Mo Ma-develop / ABS-CBN 2)

2012: Pokwang (Toda Max / ABS-CBN 2) & Rufa Mae Quinto (Bubble Gang / GMA 7) [tied]

2013: Rufa Mae Quinto (Bubble Gang / GMA 7)

2014: Rufa Mae Quinto (Bubble Gang / GMA 7)

2015: Rufa Mae Quinto (Bubble Gang / GMA 7)

2016: Manilyn Reynes (Pepito Manaloto / GMA 7)

2017: Ai-Ai delas Alas (Hay, Bahay! / GMA 7)

2018: Rufa Mae Quinto (Home Sweetie Home / ABS-CBN 2)

2019: Maine Mendoza (Daddy's Gurl / GMA 7)

=== 2020s ===
2020: Manilyn Reynes (Pepito Manaloto / GMA 7)

2021: Manilyn Reynes (Pepito Manaloto / GMA 7)

2023: Chariz Solomon (Bubble Gang / GMA 7)

2024: Maricel Soriano (3-iN-1 / Net 25)

==== Multiple awards ====
Actress	Record Set
Rufa Mae Quinto	10
Ai-Ai delas Alas	8
Nova Villa	4
Manilyn Reynes	3
Caridad Sanchez	2
Pokwang	2
