= List of actors who have played the president of the Philippines =

This is a partial list of actors who have played the role of a real or fictitious president of the Philippines in films, television, and other media.

This list excludes:

- Other historical figures has been considered by historians as an unofficial president of the Philippines and was similarly portrayed in fiction as such like the depiction of Andres Bonifacio by Robin Padilla in the 2014 film Bonifacio: Ang Unang Pangulo.
- Depiction of a president of the Philippines that covered a period outside their presidencies; e.g. Iginuhit ng Tadhana a 1965 biographical film of Ferdinand Marcos prior to his being elected president.

== Portrayal of real presidents ==
=== Film ===
President	Actor	Film	Year
Emilio Aguinaldo	Charles Stevens	Across the Pacific	1926
Emilio Aguinaldo	Roy Lachica	Virgin Forest	1985
Emilio Aguinaldo	Mike Lloren	Sakay	1993
Emilio Aguinaldo	Joel Torre	Tirad Pass: The Last Stand of Gen. Gregorio del Pilar	1996
Emilio Aguinaldo	Mengie Ngo	Baler	2008
Emilio Aguinaldo	Lance Raymundo	Ang Paglilitis ni Andres Bonifacio	2012
Emilio Aguinaldo	E.R. Ejercito	El Presidente	2012
Emilio Aguinaldo	Jun Nayra	Bonifacio: Ang Unang Pangulo	2014
Emilio Aguinaldo	Alex Medina	Apolinario Mabini: Talino at Paninindigan	2015
Emilio Aguinaldo	Mon Confiado	Heneral Luna	2015
Emilio Aguinaldo	Mon Confiado	Goyo: Ang Batang Heneral	2018
Emilio Aguinaldo	Jan Crezul Balodong	Maypagasa: Ang Bantayog ni Andres Bonifacio	2018
Manuel Quezon	Raymond Bagatsing	Quezon's Game	2018
Manuel Quezon	Arpee Bautista	Honor: The Legacy of Jose Abad Santos	2018
Manuel Quezon	Jericho Rosales	Quezon	2025
Jose P. Laurel	Omar Flores	Laurel	2019
Ramon Magsaysay	Jose Reyes	The Moises Padilla Story	1961
Diosdado Macapagal	Leopoldo Salcedo	The Macapagal Story	1963
Diosdado Macapagal	Fred Montilla	Tagumpay ng Mahirap	1965
Ferdinand Marcos	Luis Gonzales	Pinagbuklod ng Langit	1969
Ferdinand Marcos	Luis Gonzales	Kumander Dante	1988
Ferdinand Marcos	Ruben Rustia	A Dangerous Life	1988
Ferdinand Marcos	Willie Nepomuceno	Mayor Cesar Climaco	1994
Ferdinand Marcos	Willie Nepomuceno	Chavit	2003
Ferdinand Marcos	Willie Nepomuceno	The Guerilla is a Poet	2013
Ferdinand Marcos	Nonie Buencamino	Eskapo	1995
Ferdinand Marcos	Pen Medina	Ang Cute ng Ina Mo	2007
Ferdinand Marcos	Lance Raymundo	Dahling Nick	2015
Ferdinand Marcos	Cesar Montano	Maid in Malacañang	2022
Ferdinand Marcos	Cesar Montano	Martyr or Murderer	2023
Ferdinand Marcos	E. R. Ejercito	Imelda Papin: The Untold Story	2023
Ferdinand Marcos	Christian Esguerra	Edjop	2026
Corazon Aquino	Laurice Guillen	A Dangerous Life	1988
Corazon Aquino	Luz Valdez	Alfredo Lim: Batas ng Maynila	1995
Corazon Aquino	Tess Villarama	Ilaban Mo, Bayan Ko: The Obet Pagdanganan Story	1997
Corazon Aquino	Tess Villarama	Chavit	2003
Corazon Aquino	Pia Millado	The Last Journey of Ninoy	2009
Corazon Aquino	Giselle Sanchez	Maid in Malacañang	2022
Corazon Aquino	Sachzna Laparan	Martyr or Murderer	2023
Joseph Estrada	Dante Castro	Home Along Da Riles: The Movie	1993
Joseph Estrada	Willie Nepomuceno	Chavit	2003
Benigno Aquino III	Jervi Cajarop	The Amazing Praybeyt Benjamin	2014
Benigno Aquino III	Jervi Cajarop	Mamasapano: Now It Can Be Told	2022

=== Television ===
President	Actor	Program	Year
Emilio Aguinaldo
Emilio Aguinaldo	Eddie Garcia	Áawitan Kita (Ang Lakambini at Ang Supremo)	1970s
Emilio Aguinaldo	Raymond Alsona	Bayani	1996
Emilio Aguinaldo	Karl Medina	Gregorio del Pilar: Bayani o Berdugo? (Gregorio del Pilar: A Hero or Executioner?), an episode of Case Unclosed by GMA Network.	2008
Emilio Aguinaldo	Dennis Trillo	Official Lupang Hinirang music video produced by GMA Network.	2010
Emilio Aguinaldo	Nico Antonio	Katipunan	2013
Manuel Quezon	Richard Gutierrez	Official Lupang Hinirang music video produced by GMA Network.	2010
Corazon Aquino	Jan Hooks	Saturday Night Live	1986; 1987; 1989
Rodrigo Duterte	Phillip Salvador	Maalaala Mo Kaya: Steak	2019

== Portrayal of fictional presidents ==
=== Film ===
Actor	President	Film	Year
Ernie Zarate	President Ventura	Iligpit Si Victor Saraza	1997
Eddie Gil	Himself (depicted to have won the 2004 Philippine presidential election, from which he was disqualified from running after being declared a nuisance candidate in real life)	Volta	2004
Gloria Diaz	Hillary Dafalong (assassinated)	Ang Tanging Ina N'yong Lahat	2008
DJ Durano	Bill Bilyones (acting, lost in snap election)	Ang Tanging Ina N'yong Lahat	2008
Ai-Ai delas Alas	Ina Montecillo (won snap election, resigned)	Ang Tanging Ina N'yong Lahat	2008
Cherry Pie Picache	Ren Constantino (assumed office after Ina Montecillo's resignation)	Ang Tanging Ina N'yong Lahat	2008
Cherry Pie Picache	Ren Constantino	Ang Tanging Ina Mo (Last na 'To!)	2010
Cherry Pie Picache	Ren Constantino (mention only)	Enteng ng Ina Mo	2011
Bibeth Orteza	Genoviva Obrero	10,000 Hours	2013

=== Television ===
Actor	President	Television series	Year
Joji Isla	Marcurakus (parody of Ferdinand Marcos)	Sic O'Clock News	1987–1989
Ces Quesada	Presidentita (parody of Corazon Aquino)	Sic O'Clock News	1987–1990
Madeleine Nicolas	Tita Cory Pepino (parody of Corazon Aquino)	Ispup	1999–2004
Willie Nepomuceno	Sherep Entrada (parody of Joseph Estrada)	Ispup	1999–2004
Candy Pangilinan	Gloring Macabagal-Barroyo (parody of Gloria Macapagal-Arroyo)	Ispup	2001–2004
Michael V.	GMHey (parody of Gloria Macapagal-Arroyo)	Bubble Gang	2001–2010
Eddie Garcia	Leandro Montemayor	Kung Mawawala Ka	2002–2003
Rowell Santiago	Juan Policarpio	Tanging Yaman	2010
Jackie Lou Blanco	Ramona Escalabre (outgoing president)	Genesis	2013
Lorna Tolentino	Sandra Sebastian-Trinidad	Genesis	2013
Eula Valdez	Leonora Clarissa "Leona" Jacinto-Gonzaga	Princess in the Palace	2015–2016
Jose Manalo	Rodney Juterte (parody of Rodrigo Duterte)	Sunday PinaSaya	2016
Joel de la Fuente	Datu Andrada (loosely based on Rodrigo Duterte)	Madam Secretary	2017
Maja Salvador	Ivy P. Aguas/Lily Cruz-Torillo (President-elect)	Wildflower	2018
Rowell Santiago	Oscar Hidalgo	Ang Probinsyano	2018–2022
Edu Manzano	Lucas Cabrera (Acting President)	Ang Probinsyano	2018–2019
Noel Colet	Camilo Edades (Acting President)	Ang Probinsyano	2022
Menggie Cobarrubias	Ricardo San Jose (final appearance)	Beautiful Justice	2020
Boots Anson-Roa	Diane Carlos (died in office)	First Yaya	2021–2022
Gabby Concepcion	Glenn Acosta (Acting President)	First Yaya	2021–2022
Gabby Concepcion	Glenn Acosta (Acting President)	First Lady	2022
Sanya Lopez	Melody Reyes-Acosta (inaugurated at the series finale)	First Lady	2022
Chanda Romero	Madam President	Black Rider	2024
John Arcilla	Elias Sagrado (resigned)	Pamilya Sagrado	2024
Piolo Pascual	Rafael Sagrado (Acting President)	Pamilya Sagrado	2024
Dingdong Dantes	Frederico Macalintal	Lilet Matias: Attorney-at-Law	2025
Agot Isidro	Nathalia Mendoza	Blood vs Duty	2026
Alex Calleja	Mr. President	A Secret in Prague	2026
