= Kool Ka Lang (film) =

Philippine comedy film

- Directed by: Tata Esteban
- Written by: Eddie Rodriguez; Elson Montalbo
- Produced by: William Leary
- Starring: Jessa Zaragoza; Rufa Mae Quinto; Cara Marsan; Erika Fife; Rizza Padilla
- Cinematography: Sergio Lobo; Ben Lobo
- Edited by: Joyce Bernal
- Music by: Ricky del Rosario
- Production company: Falcon Films
- Distributed by: Falcon Films
- Release date: October 9, 1996
- Running time: 100 minutes
- Country: Philippines
- Language: Filipino

Kool Ka Lang is a 1996 Philippine comedy film directed by Tata Esteban. The film stars Jessa Zaragoza, Rufa Mae Quinto, Cara Marsan, Erika Fife and Rizza Padilla. It is named after Prettier Than Pink's hit song Cool Ka Lang.

== Cast ==
- Jessa Zaragoza as Sandy
- Rufa Mae Quinto as Karen Hipolito
- Cara Marsan as Anna
- Erika Fife as Grace
- Rizza Padilla as Helen
- Jay Manalo as Ramon Padilla
- Lander Vera-Perez as Willie De Mesa
- Brando Legaspi as Mike Remando
- Lee Robin Salazar as Rick
- Michael Gomez as Jeff Martinez
- Cita Astals as Tita Tot
- Danny "Brownie" Punzalan as Budoy
- Dexter Doria as Chuchi
- Cloyd Robinson as Direk
- Gino Ilustre as Tita Tot's Husband
- Archi Adamos as Mr. Liorente
- Rey Canete as Twinkie
- Panyang as Mommie
- Madam Auring as Mommie's Friend
- Kieth Serrano as Jojo
- Loretta Lahara as Mike's Girlfriend
