= Joyce Bernal =

Filipino film and television director

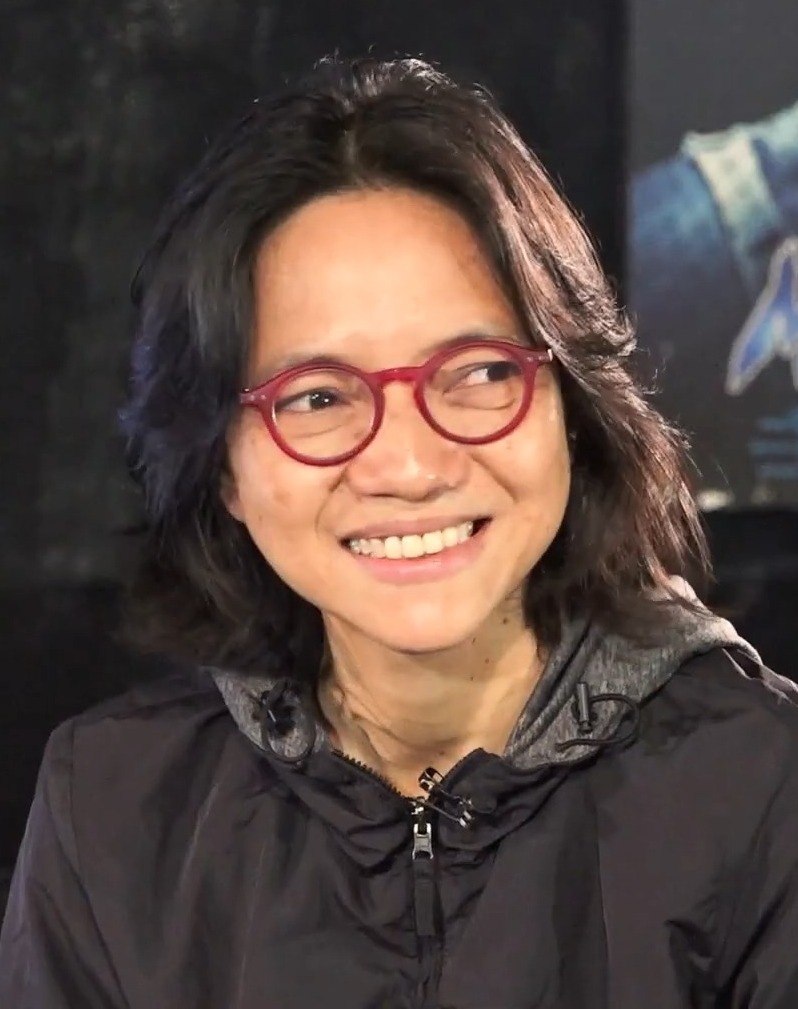
- Bernal in 2021
- Born: Joyce E. Bernal; May 6, 1968 (age 58); Manila, Philippines
- Occupations: Film editor and Film director
- Years active: 1989–present
- Known for: Director

Joyce E. Bernal (born May 6, 1968) is a Filipina film and television director. Her entry to the film industry began when she became a film editing apprentice under Ike Jarlego Jr. for Viva Films in 1989, the year she worked on Eddie Garcia's film Imortal.

== Career ==
On July 23, 2018, she directed the third State of the Nation Address of President Rodrigo Duterte. Bernal was again tapped to direct Duterte's fourth State of the Nation Address on July 22, 2019 and for the fifth State of the Nation Address on July 27, 2020.

== Filmography ==
=== Film ===
==== As director ====
Year	Title	Associated film outfit	Lead stars
1998	I'm Sorry My Love	Viva Films	Judy Ann Santos
1999	Dahil May Isang Ikaw	Viva Films	Regine Velasquez and Aga Muhlach
1999	Hey Babe	Star Cinema	Jolina Magdangal and Marvin Agustin
2000	Tunay Na Tunay: Gets Mo? Gets Ko!	Star Cinema	Jolina Magdangal and Robin Padilla
2000	Kailangan Ko'y Ikaw	Viva Films	Regine Velasquez and Robin Padilla
2001	Booba	Viva Films	Rufa Mae Quinto
2001	Buhay Kamao	Viva Films	Robin Padilla
2001	Pangako... Ikaw Lang	Viva Films	Regine Velasquez and Aga Muhlach
2001	Pagdating ng Panahon	Viva Films	Sharon Cuneta and Robin Padilla
2002	Super B	Viva Films	Rufa Mae Quinto
2003	Till There Was You	Star Cinema	Judy Ann Santos and Piolo Pascual
2003	Mr. Suave	Star Cinema	Vhong Navarro
2004	Masikip sa Dibdib: The Boobita Rose Story	Viva Films	Rufa Mae Quinto
2005	D' Anothers	Star Cinema	Vhong Navarro and Toni Gonzaga
2006	Don't Give Up on Us	Star Cinema	Judy Ann Santos and Piolo Pascual
2006	All About Love	Star Cinema	Anne Curtis and Luis Manzano
2007	Agent X44	Star Cinema	Vhong Navarro
2007	Paano Kita Iibigin	Star Cinema; Viva Films	Regine Velasquez and Piolo Pascual
2008	For The First Time	Star Cinema	KC Concepcion and Richard Gutierrez
2009	Kimmy Dora: Kambal sa Kiyeme	Spring Films; Star Cinema (distributor)	Eugene Domingo
2011	Segunda Mano	Star Cinema	Kris Aquino, Dingdong Dantes, Angelica Panganiban
2012	Kimmy Dora and the Temple of Kiyeme	Star Cinema; Spring Films	Eugene Domingo
2012	Of All the Things	GMA Films, Viva Films	Regine Velasquez and Aga Muhlach
2013	Bakit Hindi Ka Crush Ng Crush Mo?	Star Cinema	Kim Chiu and Xian Lim
2013	10,000 Hours	Viva Films	Robin Padilla
2014	Da Possessed	Star Cinema; Regal Films	Vhong Navarro and Solenn Heussaff
2014	My Big Bossing	OctoArts Films; APT Entertainment; M-Zet Productions	Vic Sotto, Ryzza Mae Dizon, Alonzo Muhlach, and Nikki Gil
2016	Everything About Her	Star Cinema	Vilma Santos, Xian Lim and Angel Locsin
2016	The Super Parental Guardians	Star Cinema	Vice Ganda, Coco Martin
2017	Last Night	N2 Productions, Spring Films, Star Cinema	Piolo Pascual, Toni Gonzaga
2017	Gandarrapiddo: The Revenger Squad	Star Cinema, Viva Films	Vice Ganda, Daniel Padilla, Pia Wurtzbach
2018	Miss Granny	Viva Films	Sarah Geronimo, Xian Lim, James Reid and Nova Villa
TBA	Booba 2		Rufa Mae Quinto

==== As editor ====
Year	Title	Notes
1989	Imortal	Uncredited assistant editor
1992	Pat. Omar Abdullah: Pulis Probinsiya	As 3rd assistant editor
1992	Totoy Guwapo, Alyas Kanto Boy	As co-editor
1992	Sgt. Ernesto Baliola: Tinik sa Batas	As assistant editor
1992	Tag-araw, Tag-ulan	As assistant film editor
1992	Jaime Labrador: Sakristan Mayor	As assistant editor
1992	Alyas Pogi 2	As assistant editor
1992	Boy Recto	As assistant editor
1993	Ikaw Lang	As assistant editor
1993	Teacher...Teacher I Love You	As assistant editor
1993	Alejandro "Diablo" Malubay	As assistant editor
1993	Dunkin Donato	As assistant editor
1993	Leonardo Delos Reyes, Alyas Waway	As assistant editor
1993	Mancao	As assistant editor
1994	Pinagbiyak Na Bunga (Lookalayk)	As assistant editor
1994	Ismael Zacarias	As assistant editor
1994	Kanto Boy 2: Anak ni Totoy Guapo	
1995	The Flor Contemplacion Story	
1995	The Grepor Butch Belgica Story	
1995	Manalo, Matalo, Mahal Kita	
1995	Sabado Nights	
1996	Maginoong Barumbado: Kung May Halaga Pa ang Buhay Mo	As guest film editor
1996	Tubusin Mo ng Bala ang Puso Ko	
1996	Utol	
1996	Cedie	
1996	Mara Clara: The Movie	
1996	Kool Ka Lang	
1996	Nag-iisang Ikaw	
1997	Ang Pulubi at ang Prinsesa	
1997	Wala Nang Iibigin Pang Iba	
1997	Calvento Files: The Movie	
1997	Pusakal	
1997	Flames: The Movie	
1997	Hanggang Kailan Kita Mamahalin?	
1997	Bayad Puri	
1997	Wala Ka Nang Puwang sa Mundo	
1997	Ipaglaban Mo: The Movie II	
1997	Sanggano	
1998	Kung Ayaw Mo, Huwag Mo!	
1998	Dr. X on the Air	
1998	Kasangga... Kahit Kelan	
1998	Dahil Mahal Na Mahal Kita	
1998	Cariño Brutal	
1998	I'm Sorry My Love	
1998	Notoryus	
1998	Warfreak	
1999	Mula sa Puso: The Movie	
1999	Gimik!: The Reunion	
1999	Dahil May Isang Ikaw	
1999	Bullet	
1999	Alyas Pogi: Ang Pagbabalik	
1999	Hey Babe!	
1999	Kiss Mo 'Ko	
2000	Palaban	
2000	Tunay Na Tunay: Gets Mo? Gets Ko!	
2000	Ika-13 Kapitulo	
2000	Kailangan Ko'y Ikaw	
2000	Ping Lacson: Super Cop	
2001	Booba	
2001	Buhay Kamao	
2001	Pangako... Ikaw Lang	
2001	La Vida Rosa	
2001	Pagdating ng Panahon	
2011	Segunda Mano	
2012	Of All the Things	
2012	Kimmy Dora and the Temple of Kiyeme	Also executive producer
2013	Bakit Hindi Ka Crush ng Crush Mo?	
2013	10,000 Hours	Also story writer
2013	Kimmy Dora: Ang Kiyemeng Prequel	As supervising editor Also executive producer
2014	Da Possessed	
2014	Relaks, It's Just Pag-ibig	Also supervising editor, executive producer
2014	My Big Bossing	"Prinsesa" segment
2016	Everything About Her	
2016	The Super Parental Guardians	
2017	Last Night	Also producer
2017	Gandarrapiddo! The Revenger Squad	Also additional scenes and dialogue
2018	Never Not Love You	As additional editor
2018	Miss Granny	Also creative producer
2018	Fantastica	As chief editor
2019	Edward	Also creative producer, executive producer
2021	My Amanda	Also creative producer, executive producer

=== Television ===
Year	Title	Producer	Lead stars
2002	Ang Iibigin ay Ikaw	GMA Network	Christopher de Leon, Lani Mercado, Richard Gomez, Alice Dixson
2003	Ang Iibigin ay Ikaw Pa Rin	GMA Network	Christopher de Leon, Lani Mercado, Richard Gomez, Alice Dixson
2003	StarStruck	GMA Network	various
2007	Marimar	GMA Network	Marian Rivera, Dingdong Dantes
2008	Star Magic Presents: Deal or No Deal	ABS-CBN	Angelica Panganiban
2008	Dyesebel	GMA Network	Marian Rivera, Dingdong Dantes
2009	Ang Babaeng Hinugot sa Aking Tadyang	GMA Network	Marian Rivera, Dingdong Dantes
2009	Stairway to Heaven	GMA Network	Dingdong Dantes, Rhian Ramos, Glaiza de Castro, TJ Trinidad
2010	BFGF	TV5	Kean Cipriano, Alex Gonzaga
2010	Inday Wanda	TV5	Eugene Domingo, Cogie Domingo
2010	5 Star Specials	TV5	various
2011	I Heart You, Pare!	GMA Network	Regine Velasquez, Iza Calzado, Dingdong Dantes
2011	Babaeng Hampaslupa	TV5	Alex Gonzaga, Martin Escudero, Alice Dixson, Jay Manalo, Susan Roces, Freddie Webb, Eddie Garcia
2011	Rod Santiago's The Sisters	TV5	Nadine Samonte, Leandro Muñoz, James Blanco, Wendell Ramos
2011–12	Glamorosa	TV5	Lorna Tolentino, Alice Dixson, Ritz Azul
2012	Kapitan Awesome	TV5	Martin Escudero, Empoy Marquez, Andrew E.
2012	Enchanted Garden	TV5	Alex Gonzaga, Alice Dixson, Ruffa Gutierrez, BB Gandanghari, Martin Escudero, Daniel Matsunaga
2013	Kailangan Ko'y Ikaw	ABS-CBN	Kris Aquino, Robin Padilla, Anne Curtis
2013	Genesis	GMA Network	Dingdong Dantes, Rhian Ramos, TJ Trinidad, Lorna Tolentino
2014	Paraiso Ko'y Ikaw	GMA Network	Kim Rodriguez, Kristofer Martin
2014	My Destiny	GMA Network	Carla Abellana, Tom Rodriguez, Lorna Tolentino, Rhian Ramos, Sid Lucero
2015	Once Upon a Kiss	GMA Network	Miguel Tanfelix, Bianca Umali
2015	My Faithful Husband	GMA Network	Jennylyn Mercado, Dennis Trillo
2015	Starstruck VI	GMA Network	as Mentor
2016	That's My Amboy	GMA Network	Barbie Forteza, Andre Paras
2016–2017	Alyas Robin Hood	GMA Network	Dingdong Dantes, Andrea Torres
2017	My Love from the Star	GMA Network	Jennylyn Mercado, Gil Cuerva

=== Music videos ===
Year	Title	Producer	Lead Stars	Performer
2014	Ang Pag-Ibig Kong Ito	Star Records	Alex Medina	Darryl Shy

== Awards and nominations ==
Year	Award-giving body	Category	Work	Result
2001	Gawad Urian		La Vida Rosa	Won
2008	GMMSF Box-Office Entertainment Awards	Most Popular TV Director/s (with Mac Alejandre	MariMar	Won
2009	GMMSF Box-Office Entertainment Awards	Most Popular TV Director	Dyesebel	Won
2013	Metro Manila Film Festival	Best Director	10,000 Hours	Won
