= Willie Nepomuceno =

Filipino comedian (1948–2023)

- Born: Wilfrido S. Nepomuceno; July 8, 1948
- Died: July 26, 2023 (aged 75); Marikina, Philippines
- Resting place: Loyola Memorial Park, Marikina, Philippines
- Other name: Willie Nep
- Occupations: Impersonator, singer, actor
- Years active: 1970–2023

Wilfrido S. Nepomuceno (July 8, 1948 – July 26, 2023), professionally known as Willie Nepomuceno, was a Filipino impersonator and satirist. With a career spanning five decades, he was best known for his impersonation of political personalities, especially Philippine presidents such as Ferdinand Marcos, Fidel V. Ramos, Joseph Estrada, Benigno Aquino III, and Rodrigo Duterte, as well as actors such as Fernando Poe Jr. and Dolphy.

== Personal life ==
Nepomuceno was born on July 8, 1948, to Leonardo and Paquita Nepomuceno.

In 2014, Nepomuceno's then 16-year-old grandson Sean Gabriel was shot and injured in Marikina.

In 2016, Nepomuceno suffered a stroke that left him debilitated for two years, but recovered following constant therapy.

Nepomuceno died on July 26, 2023, at the age of 75. He had been hospitalised at the Marikina Valley Medical Center in Marikina after suffering head injuries following a fall from his bed on July 24.

== Selected filmography ==
=== Television ===
- Ispup (2002–2004)
- It's Showtime (judge)

=== Film ===
- Mayor Cesar Climaco (1994) – President Ferdinand Marcos
- Chavit (2003) – President Ferdinand Marcos
- The Guerrilla Is a Poet (2013) – President Ferdinand Marcos

== Discography ==
=== Studio albums ===
- Ako ay Ikaw Rin
- Willie's Way (1984)
- Snap Revolution: The Untold Story of People Power (1987)
- Menemis Willie Nep (1991)
- Willie Nep for President (Vote One, Take All)
- Love Album (2005)

=== Singles ===
- "Opisina" / "Blueseal" (1991)
- "Grabeng Traffic" (1992)

== See also ==
- Comedy in the Philippines
- Martial Law under Ferdinand Marcos
- Sic O' Clock News
- List of actors who played the president of the Philippines
