= Marinara (TV series) =

2004 Philippine television drama series

- Title card
- Genre: Comedy drama; Fantasy
- Developed by: Gina Marissa Tagasa
- Directed by: Enrico Quizon; Soxie Topacio
- Starring: Rufa Mae Quinto
- Theme music composer: Ogie Alcasid
- Opening theme: "Marinara" by Rufa Mae Quinto
- Country of origin: Philippines
- Original language: Tagalog
- No. of episodes: 75

Production
- Executive producer: Redgynn Alba
- Production locations: Metro Manila, Philippines; Pampanga, Philippines
- Camera setup: Multiple-camera setup
- Running time: 30 minutes
- Production company: GMA Entertainment TV

Original release
- Network: GMA Network
- Release: June 21 – October 1, 2004

Marinara is a 2004 Philippine television drama fantasy comedy series broadcast by GMA Network. Directed by Enrico Quizon and Soxy Topacio, it stars Rufa Mae Quinto in the title role. It premiered on June 21, 2004 on the network's Telebabad line up. The series concluded on October 1, 2004, with a total of 75 episodes.

The series is streaming online on YouTube.

== Cast and characters ==
Cast

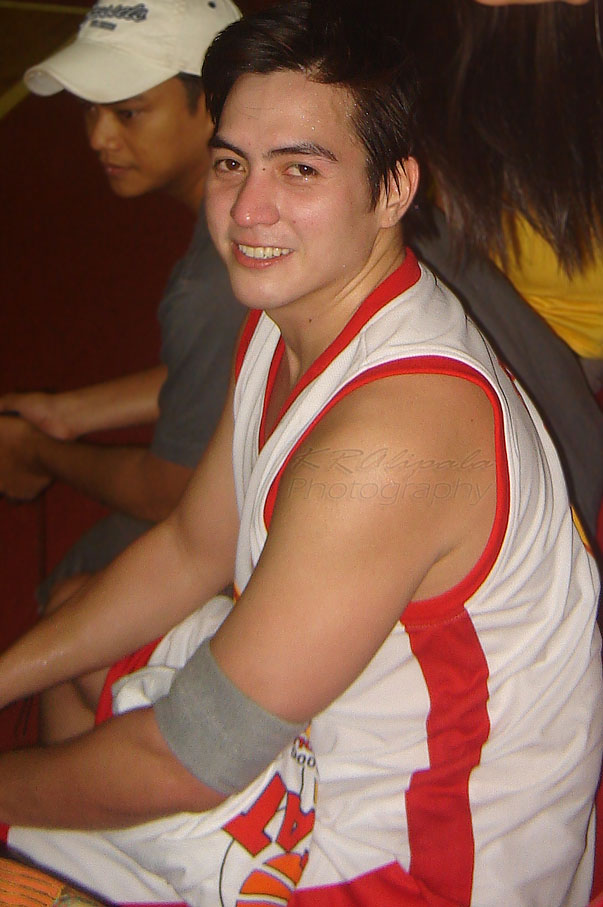
Wendell Ramos

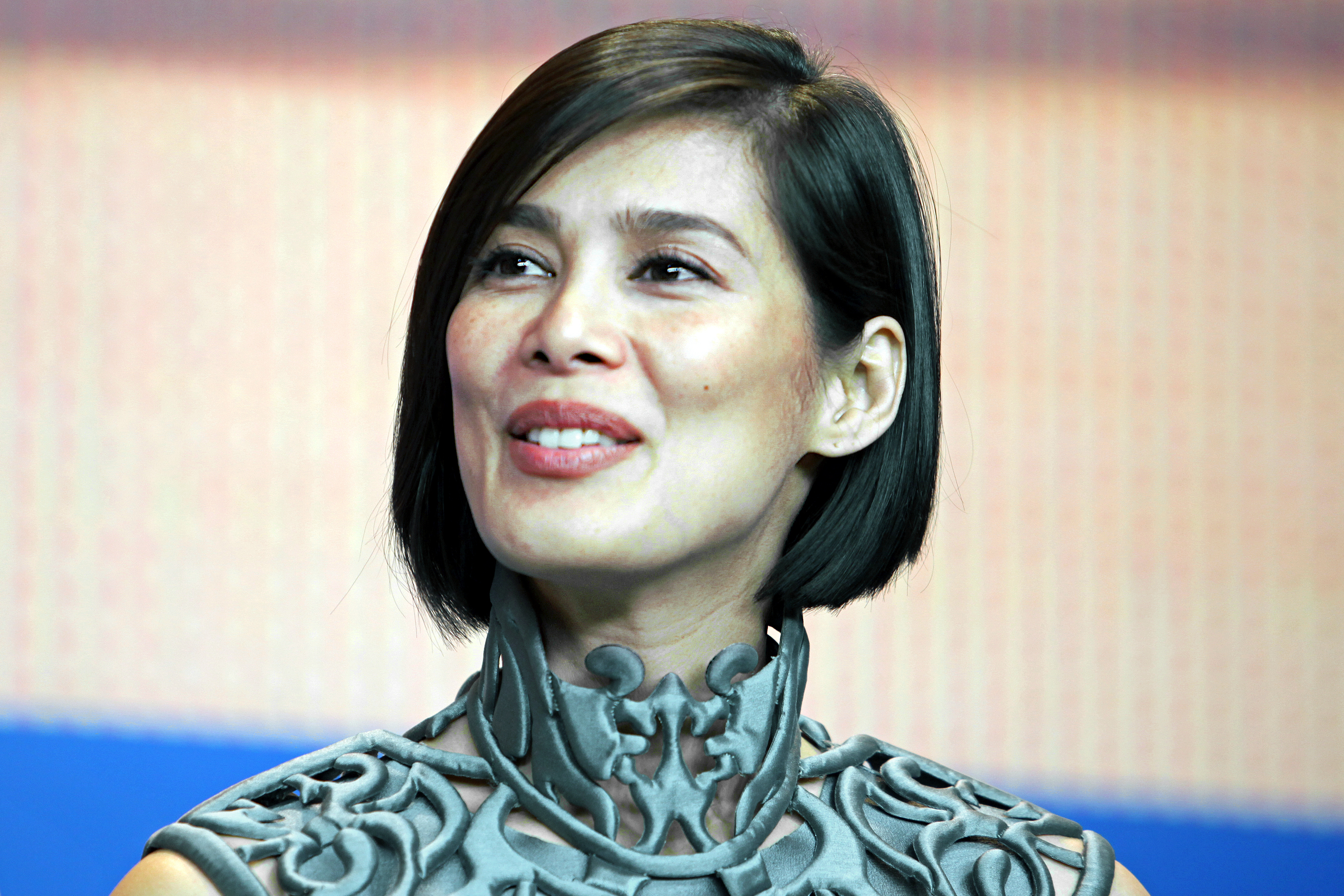
Angel Aquino

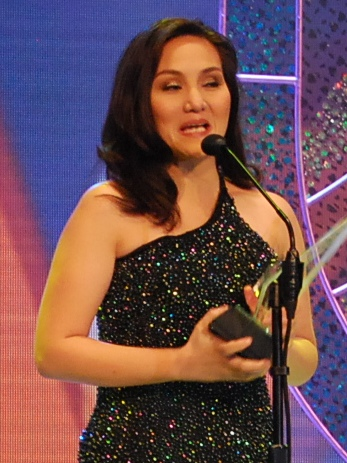
Gladys Reyes

Lead cast

- Rufa Mae Quinto as Marie / Dolphina / Aira

Supporting cast

- Wendell Ramos as Luis Iñigo
- Alfred Vargas as Felipe
- Angel Aquino as Oceana
- Ronaldo Valdez as Juan Miguel
- Daria Ramirez as Lelay
- Melanie Marquez as Zadama
- Gladys Reyes as Tara
- Mel Martinez as Syoque
- Sherilyn Reyes as Arwana
- Gene Padilla as Pogito
- Vangie Labalan as Pinang
- Julianne Lee as Ayel
- Zack Togezaki as JM
- Jess Lapid, Jr. as Alvaro

Guest cast

- Eddie Garcia as Karfa
- Michael V. as fake Aira / Freddie Gil
- Rudy Fernandez as Daboy
- Janno Gibbs as younger Juan Miguel
- K Brosas as Sushi Lou
- Tess Bomb as Flordetuna
- Patricia Ysmael as Lordilis
- Joy Viado
- Diego Llorico as Dikoy
- Rudy Hatfield as Rudy
