= Super B (film) =

2002 Philippine superhero comedy film

- Directed by: Joyce Bernal
- Written by: Juan Maria Mendoza
- Produced by: Teresita Cruz
- Starring: Rufa Mae Quinto
- Cinematography: Charlie Peralta
- Edited by: Marya Ignacio
- Music by: Ricky del Rosario
- Production company: Neo Films
- Distributed by: Neo Films
- Release date: June 12, 2002
- Running time: 102 minutes
- Country: Philippines
- Language: Filipino

Super B is a 2002 Philippine comedy superhero film directed by Joyce Bernal. The film stars Rufa Mae Quinto as the title role. It was one of the entries in the 2002 Manila Film Festival and the first film produced by Neo Films since 1999.

The film is streaming online on YouTube.

== Cast ==
- Rufa Mae Quinto as Bilma
- Marvin Agustin as Lordino
- Melanie Marquez as Rose
- Mylene Dizon as Daisy
- Troy Montero as Edgar
- Aiza Marquez as Emilyn
- Isabelle de Leon as Wennie
- Dick Israel as Tatay Billy
- Maria Isabel Lopez as Nanay Mameng
- Marissa Delgado as Madam Puring
