= Chavit (film) =

- Directed by: Carlo J. Caparas
- Written by: Luis "Chavit" Singson; Carlo J. Caparas
- Starring: Cesar Montano
- Cinematography: Rey de Leon
- Edited by: Abelardo 'Ding' Hulleza
- Music by: Willie Islao
- Production companies: Golden Lions Films; Starmax International; Velcor Films
- Release date: November 26, 2003
- Country: Philippines
- Language: Filipino
- Budget: ₱80 million

Chavit, also known as Chavit Singson Story and Chavit: Blood Son of Ilocos, is a 2003 Filipino epic biographical drama film directed by Carlo J. Caparas based on a script by Caparas and politician Chavit Singson. About the life of Singson, it stars Cesar Montano as the titular character, alongside Eddie Garcia, Tirso Cruz III, Dina Bonnevie, Pinky de Leon, Ricardo Cepeda, Joel Torre, Tommy Abuel, Marita Zobel and Jean Saburit.

== Premise ==
This film is about the story of Luis "Chavit" Singson, the Governor of Ilocos Sur. Singson started EDSA II in October 2000 when he alleged he gave President Joseph Estrada 400 million pesos as payoff from illegal gambling profits.

Estrada was put under investigation, but on January 16, 2001, a key piece of evidence was blocked in court, leading to protests in Manila and other major cities backing Vice President Gloria Macapagal Arroyo resulting in the ouster of Estrada.

== Plot ==
The film starts with the origin of the Singsons of Ilocos Sur and the birth of Jose and Caridad's second son Luis. Chavit grows up amidst series of killings within the province, perpetrated by the Crisologos. In 1963, Representative Claro Crisologo endorses his wife Milagring for the governorship of the province in 1963. This prompts "Operation Withdraw" where all mayors of Ilocos Sur are threatened to withdraw their candidacy. Chavit becomes the chief of police in Vigan. Although the town's residents want Chavit to run for mayor, his father decides to run instead and Chavit runs for councilor. Chavit becomes the champion of the Ilocanos especially those victims of the Crisologos, particularly their son Bingbong, starting a rivalry between their families. Chavit seeks the help of Senator Ninoy Aquino.

In 1969, Bingbong perpetrates the burning of Ora Este and Ora Centro in Bantay. The following year, Congressman Claro is assassinated at Vigan Cathedral. Chavit challenges Milagring for the governorship and wins. Biboy is convicted for arson and sentenced to life imprisonment. While behind bars, Bingbong turns his life around through Bible studies before being released. During the People Power Revolution in 1986, Chavit is ousted, but is elected to Congress due to his charisma, and eventually returns as governor. He then gets involved with President Joseph Estrada, leading to the Second EDSA Revolution.

== Cast ==
Some of the characters were changed and their real names are enclosed in parentheses.

- Cesar Montano as Luis "Chavit" Singson
- Eddie Garcia as Congressman Claro Crisostomo (Floro Crisologo)
- Tirso Cruz III as Victor "Biboy" Crisostomo (Vincent "Bingbong" Crisologo)
  - Bingbong Crisologo briefly appears as Biboy Crisostomo
- Dina Bonnevie as Evelyn Verzosa
- Pinky de Leon as Governor Milagros "Milagring" Crisostomo (Carmen "Carmeling" Crisologo)
- Ricardo Cepeda as Governor Evaristo "Titong" Singson
- Joel Torre as Sotero
- Tommy Abuel as Jose "Celing" Singson
- Marita Zobel as Caridad "Caring" Crisologo
- Jean Saburit
- Anna Marin
- Rommel Montano as Chavit's driver
- Danita Paner as Anita
- Clavel Bendaña as Imelda Marcos
- Bobit Carlos as Senator Benigno "Ninoy" Aquino, Jr.
- Tess Villarama as President Corazon Aquino
- Willie Villarama
- Willie Nepomuceno as:
  - President Ferdinand Marcos
  - President Joseph "Erap" Estrada
- Manny Paner
- T.J. Cruz
- Nards Belen
- Nicole Anderson
- Angela Montano
- Issy Miyake
- Jun Collao
- Angelo Montano
- Onchie dela Cruz
- Jeri Lopez
- Pete "Bitay" Principe
- Bert Brucal
- Richard Arellano
- Lawrence Roxas
- Bryan Lacsina
- Shiela Marie Rodriguez
- Bobby Angeles
- Rhet Romero
- Ronald Regala
- Christopher Miraballes
- Malu de Luna
- Peping Cojuangco
- Tingting Cojuangco
- Billy Esposo
- Boy Saycon
- Teddy Casiño
- Argee Guevarra
- Hardie del Mundo as Ronald Singson
- Joe de Venecia as himself
- Rodolfo Albano
- Roquito Ablan Jr.
- Eric Singson
- Salacnib Baterina
- Deogracias Victor Savellano
- Ernesto Maceda as himself

== Production ==
The role played by Dina Bonnevie was originally intended for Snooky Serna. In the scene where Singson was shown crying following his brother's death, the former governor was played by his real son, Christopher. Impersonator Willie Nepomuceno played three roles in the movie, playing Ferdinand Marcos, Fernando Poe Jr. and Joseph Estrada, one of his most popular roles.

=== Accolades ===
Year	Award-giving body	Category	Recipient	Result
2004	FAMAS Awards	Best Picture	Chavit	Nominated
2004	FAMAS Awards	Best Actor	Cesar Montano	Nominated
2004	FAMAS Awards	Best Supporting Actor	Tirso Cruz III	Nominated
