= Booba (film) =

2001 comedy film by Joyce Bernal

- Directed by: Joyce Bernal
- Screenplay by: Mel Mendoza-del Rosario
- Story by: Joyce Bernal; Mel Mendoza-del Rosario
- Produced by: Vincent del Rosario III
- Starring: Rufa Mae Quinto
- Cinematography: Charlie Peralta
- Edited by: Joyce Bernal; Renato de Leon
- Music by: Edwin Ortega
- Production companies: Viva Films; RS Productions
- Distributed by: Viva Films
- Release date: January 24, 2001
- Running time: 100 minutes
- Country: Philippines
- Languages: Filipino; English

Booba is a 2001 Philippine comedy film co-edited and directed by Joyce Bernal and written by Mel Mendoza-Rosario from a story she co-developed with Bernal. The film stars Rufa Mae Quinto in the title role.

== Plot ==
Booba and Gretchen are two sisters with contrasting personalities living under their grandmother, Lola Belle. Booba is sweet but not very bright, while Gretchen is intelligent but foul-mouthed. After a disagreement with Lola Belle leads to Gretchen's eviction, Lola Belle suffers a heart attack after forgiving her, asking Booba to find Gretchen and seek her forgiveness before she passes away.

Booba moves to Manila, where she becomes a target for men who exploit her naivety. She eventually finds work as a dancer in a bar, which is raided for nudity. During the raid, she catches the attention of Gen. Lee, who recruits her as an undercover detective. While on the job, Booba discovers that Gretchen is now the leader of a criminal syndicate involved in white slavery and drug smuggling.

The sisters confront each other, leading to the arrest or death of most of Gretchen's gang, but she manages to escape. Despite Booba's efforts, Gretchen attempts to assassinate her sister during a presidential award ceremony for Booba, but ends up injuring Poli, the policeman who cares for Booba. Gretchen is subsequently arrested. While Poli is in the ICU, Booba, in denial about his condition, tries to revive him through intimate means. Remarkably, Poli awakens and shares a kiss with Booba, suggesting a hopeful turn in their relationship.

== Cast ==
- Rufa Mae Quinto as Booba
- Gary Estrada as Poli
- Ai-Ai delas Alas as Gretchen/Madam X
- Gina Pareño as Lola Belle
- Roldan Aquino as Gen. Lee
- Archie Ventosa as Gen. Dionisio
- Denver Razon as Luis
- Ava Avila as Ranza
- Rico Miguel as Bimbo
- Rad Dominguez as Jimbo
- Polly Cadsawan as Head of Syndicate
- Felindo Obach as Miguel V
- Rudy Meyer as Mang Pepe
- Josie Galvez as Wife of Mang Pepe
- George Lim as Ponga
- Angie Reyes as Junior
- Peter Lim as Eng Be Ten

== Rating ==
Despite being a straight-out comedy, the movie was rated R-18 by MTRCB for lots of nudity and foul language.

== Sequel ==
A sequel of the film has been announced with Rufa Mae Quinto returning to the iconic character after more than 20 years and Joyce Bernal returning as director.
