= Who Wants to Be a Millionaire? (Philippine game show) =

- The TV5 version of the Who Wants to Be a Millionaire? logo
- Genre: Game show
- Created by: David Briggs; Steven Knight; Mike Whitehill
- Based on: Who Wants to Be a Millionaire? by: David Briggs; Steven Knight; Mike Whitehill
- Written by: Gay Pamatpat and Tisha Rosales (IBC); Paolo Bustamante (IBC/TV5)
- Directed by: Arnel Natividad (IBC); Bert de Leon (TV5)
- Presented by: Christopher de Leon (IBC); Vic Sotto (TV5)
- Theme music composer: Keith Strachan (2000–2002); Matthew Strachan (2000–2002); Ramon Covalo (2009–2015); Nick Magnus (2009–2015)
- Country of origin: Philippines
- Original languages: Filipino (primary); English (secondary)
- No. of seasons: IBC: 7 TV5: 14
- No. of episodes: IBC: unknown TV5: 220 (final)

Production
- Executive producers: Vic del Rosario, Jr. (IBC); Toni Rose delos Santos (TV5)
- Production locations: Viva Television Studio (2000–2002); Riverbanks Center (2002); TV5 Broadcast Complex (2009–2015)
- Camera setup: Multiple-camera setup
- Running time: 50 minutes (IBC); 60 minutes (TV5)
- Production companies: Viva Television (2000–2002); TV5 (2009–2015); Sony Pictures Television International (2009–2015)

Original release
- Network: IBC
- Release: November 13, 2000 – December 14, 2002
- Network: TV5
- Release: May 23, 2009 – November 22, 2015

Who Wants to Be a Millionaire? (abbreviated as WW2BAM, informally called as Milyonaryo) (Note: The simplified title is the Tagalog translation of "Millionaire" and often used by Christopher de Leon in the Viva/IBC version.) is a Philippine television game show broadcast by IBC and TV5. The show is based on the British game show on the same name. Originally hosted by Christopher de Leon, it aired from November 13, 2000 to December 14, 2002. The first season aired on TV5 from May 23, 2009 to October 2, 2010, and was replaced by 5 Max Movies. The second season aired from May 15, 2011 to February 26, 2012, replacing My Darling Aswang in Talentadong Pinoy's timeslot and was replaced by Extreme Makeover: Home Edition Philippines in Talentadong Pinoy's timeslot. The third season aired from July 1 to October 7, 2012, replacing Extreme Makeover: Home Edition Philippines and was replaced by The Million Peso Money Drop. The fourth season aired from September 15, 2013 to January 11, 2015, replacing Istorifik: The Pidol’s Kwentong Fantastik and was replaced by Move It: Clash of the Streetdancers. The fifth and final season aired from May 10 to November 22, 2015, replacing Move It: Clash of the Streetdancers and was replaced by Barangay Utakan. Vic Sotto serve as the final host.

== History ==
=== 2000–2002: Viva/IBC version ===
The first version of the show was hosted by the actor Christopher de Leon. The first season of the original Millionaire, which began on November 13, 2000, had its 15th question prize of ₱1,000,000. On March 5, 2001, the final question's prize was doubled to ₱2,000,000.

The show lost its popularity soon after its studio, the Viva Television Studio in Parañaque was destroyed by a fire due to faulty wiring on April 4, 2002, and the show moved to Riverbanks Center in Marikina. The final episode of this incarnation aired on December 14, 2002.

The show was featured in the 2002 film Mahal Kita, Final Answer, produced by Viva Films, with de Leon on a cameo role.

=== 2009–2015: TV5 version ===
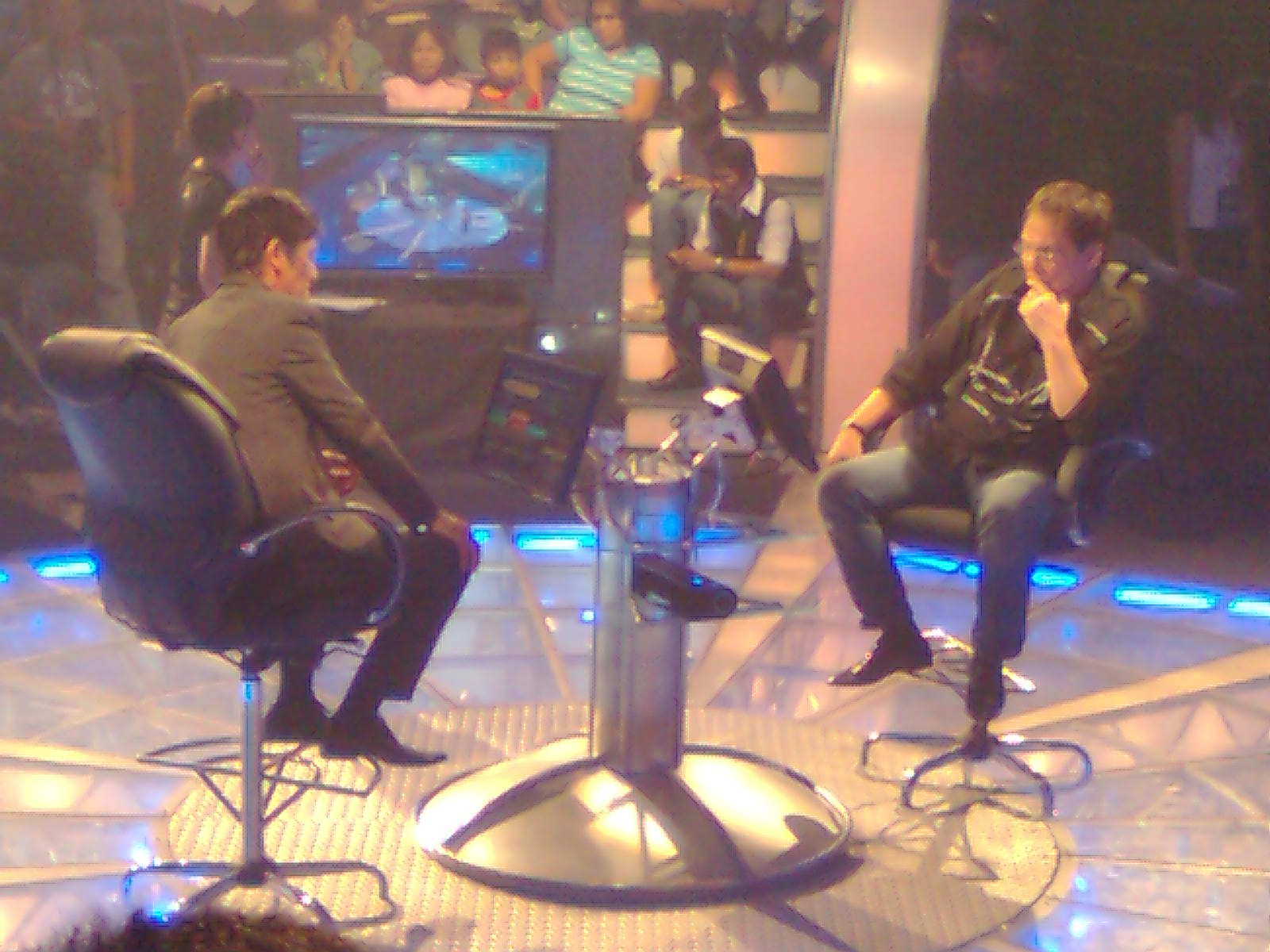
Joey de Leon (right) plays as a contestant with Vic Sotto (left) as host

In April 2009, promotional videos and content about the comeback of Who Wants to Be a Millionaire? started airing on TV5. Vic Sotto was announced as the host of the show.

The revival began airing on May 23, 2009. Following the network move, the show was taped in a new set at the TV5 Broadcast Complex in Novaliches, Quezon City and used the updated graphics from Macedonia version, title sequence, and music from the 22nd series of the original UK version. It premiered as a celebrity special, featuring 10 celebrities as contestants in the Fastest Finger First—Ara Mina, Mo Twister, Manilyn Reynes, Polo Ravales, Megan Young, Jay Manalo, Nadia Montenegro, Rafael Rosell, Gladys Reyes, and Assunta De Rossi.

The Fastest Finger First round which determined the contestant who be playing was removed in favor of auditioning through text entry and mall shows starting season 6. Producers now have a predetermined list of contestants from the auditions. When the show begin, the host just invite one by one contestants to the studio.

This incarnation of the show featured different money tree and lifeline formats. The last episode was aired on November 22, 2015.

=== Top prize winners ===
Throughout the original run on IBC, no contestant completed the game by answering all fifteen questions correctly. There were two contestants who came the closest—De La Salle University associate professor Amelita Lopez-Forbes and actress Sharon Cuneta on December 25—who each answered 14 questions correctly and won a million pesos in 2001.

In the TV5 incarnation, there were 3 contestants who have won the top prize.

==== Sharon Cuneta (January 9, 2010) ====
Sharon Cuneta's final question

₱2,000,000 (15 of 15)

According to Act 4 of Macbeth, which is an ingredient the witches used in making the potion?

1. Serpent's fang
2. Dragon's tails
3. Lizard's leg(correct answer)
4. Bat's tooth

Sharon Cuneta had previously played in the IBC version of Millionaire and walked away at question 15 with ₱1,000,000, splitting her winnings equally in thirds—for the San Lorenzo Ruiz Formation and Learning Center, for the Chosen Children Foundation, and for the sick daughter of her colleague.

On January 9, 2010, three days after her birthday, Cuneta once again played on the show and won ₱2,000,000, making her the first top prize winner in the Philippine franchise's history. All of the money she won was donated to the Hospicio de San Jose. Coincidentally, the 13th question in her game was about the name of the island where the orphanage is located, Isla de Convalecencia. The final question was about William Shakespeare's work, Macbeth.

==== Karl Jonathan Aguilar (September 18, 2011) ====
Karl Jonathan Aguilar's final question

₱2,000,000 (15 of 15)

What is the name of the list of old books prohibited by the Roman Catholic Church for its members?

1. Index Literatura Prohibitre
2. Index Librada Prohibantum
3. Index Librodo Prohibitore
4. Index Librorum Prohibitorum(correct answer)

On September 18, 2011, the Philippine version gained its second top prize winner: IT specialist Karl Jonathan Aguilar. The final question was about the name of the Index Librorum Prohibitorum. He did not use his lifelines up to the 13th question worth ₱600,000. When his last lifeline, Phone-A-Friend, was used during the final question; his friend suggested one of the wrong answers.

==== Eduardo Gaeilo Pajinag, Jr. (October 20, 2013) ====
Eduardo Gaeilo Pajinag, Jr.'s final question

₱2,000,000 (15 of 15)

What is the title of the poem by Lewis Carroll that uses nonsense words?

1. Gibberish
2. Jabberwocky(correct answer)
3. Twaddle
4. Gobbledygook

The third top-prize winner was IT auditor Eduardo "Gaeilo" Pajinag, Jr. on October 20, 2013. He said that he auditioned seven times unsuccessfully before being accepted. He was the first winner of the new money tree, the High-Risk money tree. The final question was about Jabberwocky, the nonsense poem written by Lewis Carroll. The other options were synonyms of "nonsense". After considering where the dance group Jabbawockeez got their name, he answered correctly to win the ₱2 million peso top-prize.

== Format ==
=== Game rules ===
Screenshot of the show illustrating how the question and choices appear on-screen

Payout structure
Question number	Question value					
Question number	IBC		TV5			
Question number	2000	2001–2002	2009–2015	2013–2015	2015	
Question number	2000	2001–2002	Classic	High Risk	Money Tree 1	Money Tree 2
15	₱1,000,000	₱2,000,000				
14	₱500,000	₱1,000,000				
13	₱400,000	₱500,000	₱600,000			
12	₱300,000		₱400,000			
11	₱200,000		₱250,000			
10	₱100,000		₱150,000	₱150,000	₱150,000	₱150,000
9	₱50,000		₱100,000			
8	₱40,000		₱70,000			
7	₱30,000		₱50,000			
6	₱20,000		₱35,000			
5	₱10,000		₱20,000			
4	₱5,000		₱10,000			
3	₱3,000		₱5,000		—N/a	
2	₱2,000		₱3,000		—N/a	
1	₱1,000				—N/a	
Safety net Top prize

The 10 contestants who have passed the auditions play in the preliminary round called "Fastest Finger First". Contestants must arrange the four answers in the correct order stated within the question (i.e. alphabetically, chronologically), after time up, the host will check the result. The contestant who answers the question correctly and in the fastest time plays the main game. In the event that nobody answered the question correctly, a new question is asked. If two or more contestants gave the correct order at the same time, there is a tiebreaker question between the contestants to determine who advances to the main game.

After completing Fastest Finger First, the contestant begins the main game where he/she must answer a series of increasingly difficult questions. The questions are valued at progressively higher sums of money, up to the top prize of ₱2,000,000 (₱1,000,000 in 2000). The 15 questions are randomly chosen by the computer from a list of pre-generated questions based on general knowledge. For each question, there are four options labelled from A to D. During the game, contestants are given three lifelines to help them with a question at any time. There are two safety nets at questions 5 and 10. If a contestant answers a question incorrectly but has passed a safety net, they leave with the safety net amount. If a contestant is unsure about a question, they may walk away and leave with the amount they have already banked. To confirm that their answer is final, the host asks "Is that your final answer?". Upon saying "final answer" together with the selected option, their answer is deemed final and cannot be changed. The host is not shown the correct answer on his monitor until a contestant has said "final answer". If the episode has reached the end of its allotted time, a klaxon is cued to highlight this. Contestants who are still playing the main game would return in the next episode to continue their game.

Over the course of the show's run, the format of Millionaire was changed in a number of aspects, mainly relating to the setup of questions and the payout structure used in the game, along with minor tweaks and changes in other aspects:

- In 2000, contestants had to answer fifteen questions, with two safety nets at ₱10,000 and ₱100,000, and could use the 50:50, Phone-A-Friend and Ask the Audience lifelines at any time within the game.
- The following year, the ₱400,000 question was removed. ₱500,000 and ₱1,000,000 became the 13th and 14th question values, respectively. The top prize was increased to ₱2,000,000.
- The TV5 version launched with a new money tree with modified cash values, but still with a top prize of ₱2,000,000. The safety nets were ₱20,000 and ₱150,000. The same 3 lifelines were offered.
- In the 6th season, the Ask the Audience was replaced with People Speak. Switch was also introduced as a fourth lifeline in the 6th season. It was available only after passing the second safety net. Additionally, the Fastest Finger First round was removed in favor of auditioning through text entry and mall shows. Producers now have a predetermined list of contestants from the auditions.
- In the 10th season, Phone-A-Friend was removed. Instead, Switch was available from the beginning of the game. A new format was also introduced where the contestant may choose between the Classic and High Risk money tree. In the High Risk money tree, the second safety net at ₱150,000 was removed, but a fourth lifeline, Double Dip, was added and could be used at any point within the game.
- In the 14th season, the questions were reduced from 15 to 12. Unlike its British counterpart, the first three questions were simply removed. The money trees were identified as Money Trees 1 and 2, where 1 is the Classic format and 2 is the High Risk format. The lifelines available were Phone-A-Friend, Switch and Double Dip. 50:50 was added as a fourth lifeline in High Risk format. Also, the three pre-arranged friends were displayed onscreen.

=== Lifelines ===
Contestants are given a set of lifelines to help them in the game. Lifelines may be used once only.

- 50:50: The computer removes two random incorrect answers, leaving the correct answer and one incorrect answer.
- Phone-A-Friend (2000–2002; 2009–2012; 2015): The contestant calls one of their friends from their predetermined list. They are given 30 seconds to discuss the question.
- Ask the Audience (2000–2002; 2009–2010): The members of the audience are polled using a keypad with buttons labelled from A to D. They press the button corresponding to the answer they think is the correct one. The percentage of the answers are shown onscreen and on the monitors.
- People Speak (2011–2015): Members of the audience who think that they know the answer are instructed to stand up. The contestant selects three people to be asked for their answer. A ₱20,000 cash prize is split equally to the selected people who have answered correctly.
- Switch (2011–2015): The computer picks a new question of the same value. Any lifelines used on the original question are not reinstated. This lifeline was initially available after question 11. It was made available from the beginning of the game in the succeeding seasons as a replacement for Phone-A-Friend.
- Double Dip (2013–2015): The contestant is given two chances to answer a question. If the first answer is incorrect, they cannot walk away and must give a second answer.

The set of lifelines used per season is tabulated below.

Lifeline	Season					
Lifeline	IBC	TV5				
Lifeline	1–7	1–5	6–8	9	10–13	14
50:50						
Phone-A-Friend						
Ask the Audience						
People Speak						
Switch						
Double Dip						
Available from the beginning Available only in High Risk format Available only after question 10 Not available

== Season overview ==
=== Main series ===
Season	Premiere	Finale	Episodes	Host	Network
1–7	November 13, 2000	December 14, 2002	—	Christopher de Leon	IBC
1–5	May 23, 2009	October 2, 2010	71	Vic Sotto	TV5
6–8	May 15, 2011	February 26, 2012	42	Vic Sotto	TV5
9	July 1, 2012	October 7, 2012	15	Vic Sotto	TV5
10–13	September 15, 2013	January 11, 2015	70	Vic Sotto	TV5
14	May 10, 2015	November 22, 2015	29	Vic Sotto	TV5

=== Specials ===
==== Who Deserves to Be a Millionaire? ====
For four episodes starting from December 12, 2009, to January 2, 2010, a special charity edition of the show was held called Who Deserves to Be a Millionaire?. Each episode comprised one celebrity and a representative from his/her chosen charity playing as a team. Rules stayed the same. The special charity edition returned on December 4, 2011, and lasted until December 25, 2011. Four celebrities have played for their chosen charity.

Date	Player	Amount won	Notes
December 12, 2009	Efren Peñaflorida	₱400,000	For the Dynamic Teen Company
December 19, 2009	Lucy Torres-Gomez	₱150,000	Incorrect on question 13
December 26, 2009	Senator Chiz Escudero	₱250,000	
January 2, 2010	Ruffa Gutierrez	₱400,000	
December 4, 2011	Gloria Diaz	₱400,000	
December 11, 2011	Atty. Persida Rueda-Acosta	₱600,000	
December 18, 2011	Tessa Prieto-Valdez	₱400,000	
December 25, 2011	Aiza Seguerra	₱400,000	

==== Who Wants to Be a Millionaire? Ikaw Na Yun! ====
On September 8, 2013, a week before the premiere of the tenth season, a special was aired featuring the history of the show and its international variants. Past contestants were interviewed regarding their experience on the hotseat. Several clips of the show were also shown.

== See also ==
- List of TV5 (Philippine TV network) original programming
