= Idol Ko si Kap =

Philippine television series

- Title card
- Genre: Sitcom
- Starring: Bong Revilla
- Country of origin: Philippines
- Original language: Tagalog
- No. of episodes: 505

Production
- Camera setup: Multiple-camera setup
- Running time: 35–51 minutes
- Production company: GMA Entertainment TV

Original release
- Network: GMA Network
- Release: September 17, 2000 – September 3, 2005

Idol Ko si Kap (transl. kap is my idol) is a Philippine television sitcom series broadcast by GMA Network. Starring Bong Revilla, it premiered on September 17, 2000 on the network's KiliTV line up. The series concluded on September 3, 2005, with a total of 505 episodes.

The series is streaming online on YouTube.

== Cast ==
Cast

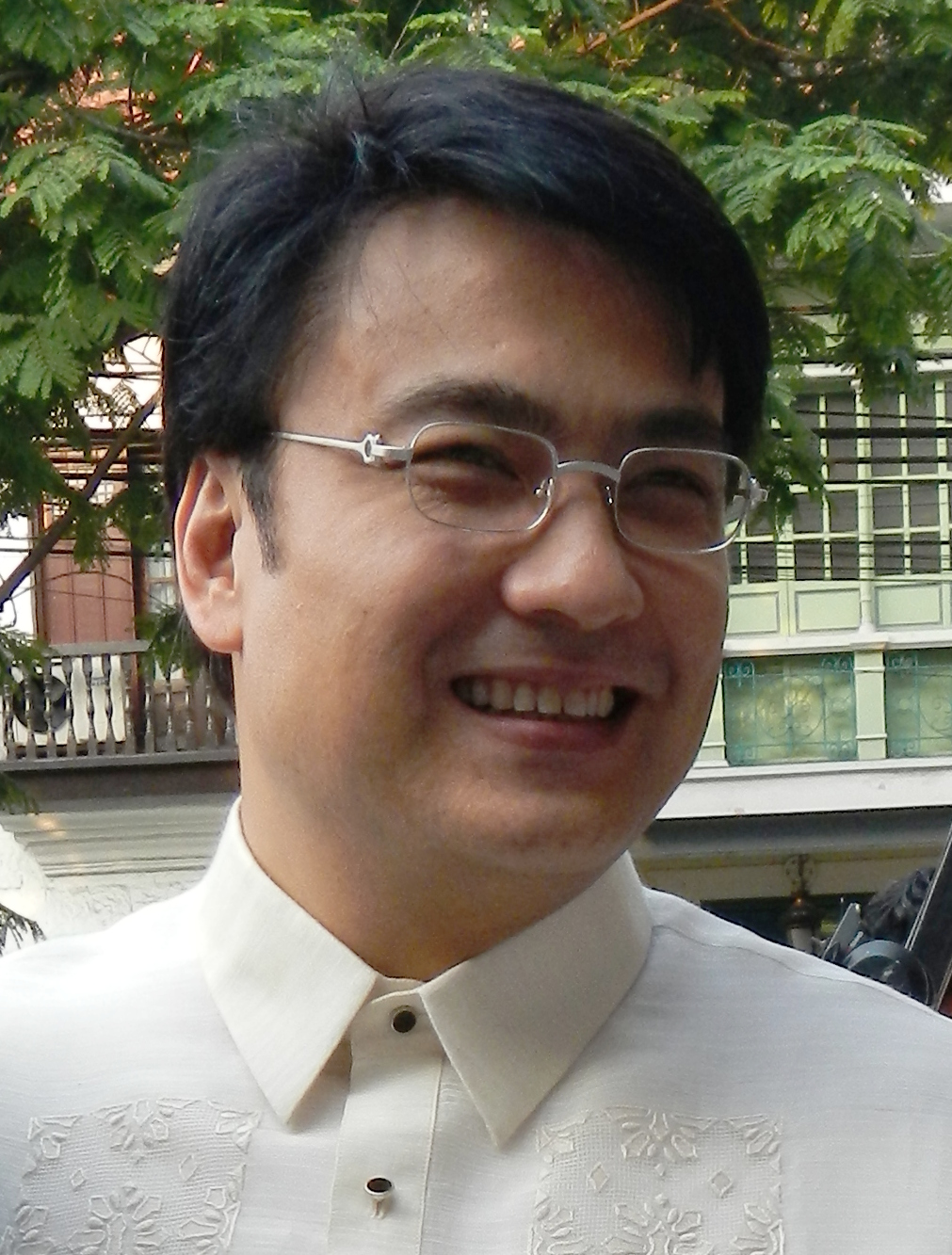
Bong Revilla

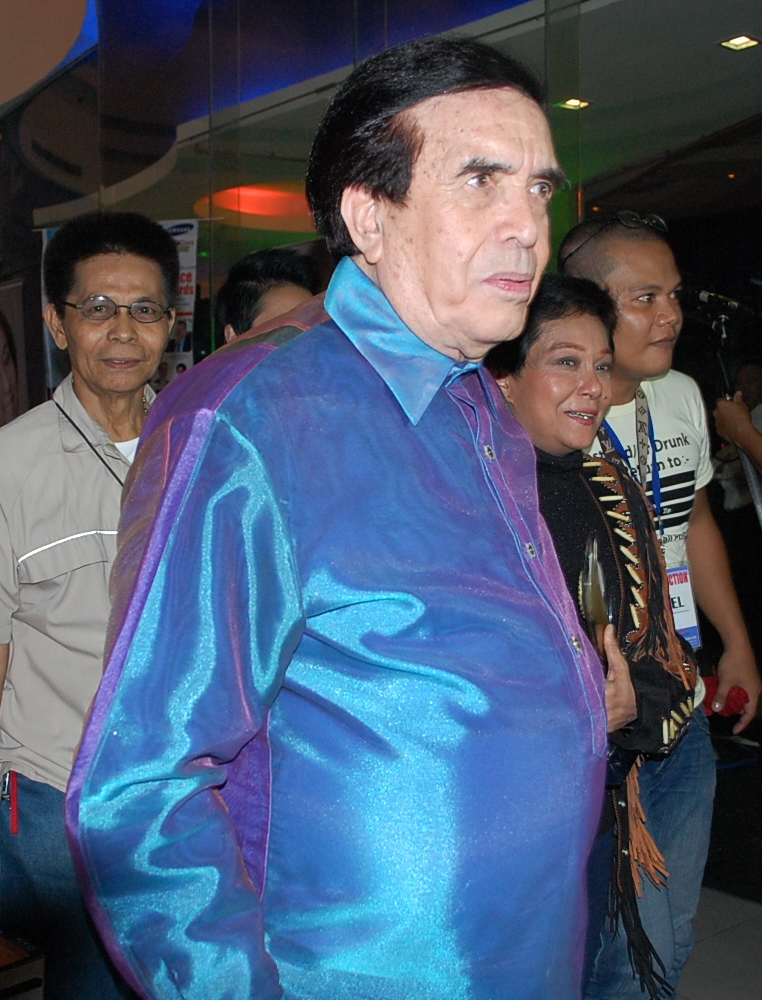
German Moreno

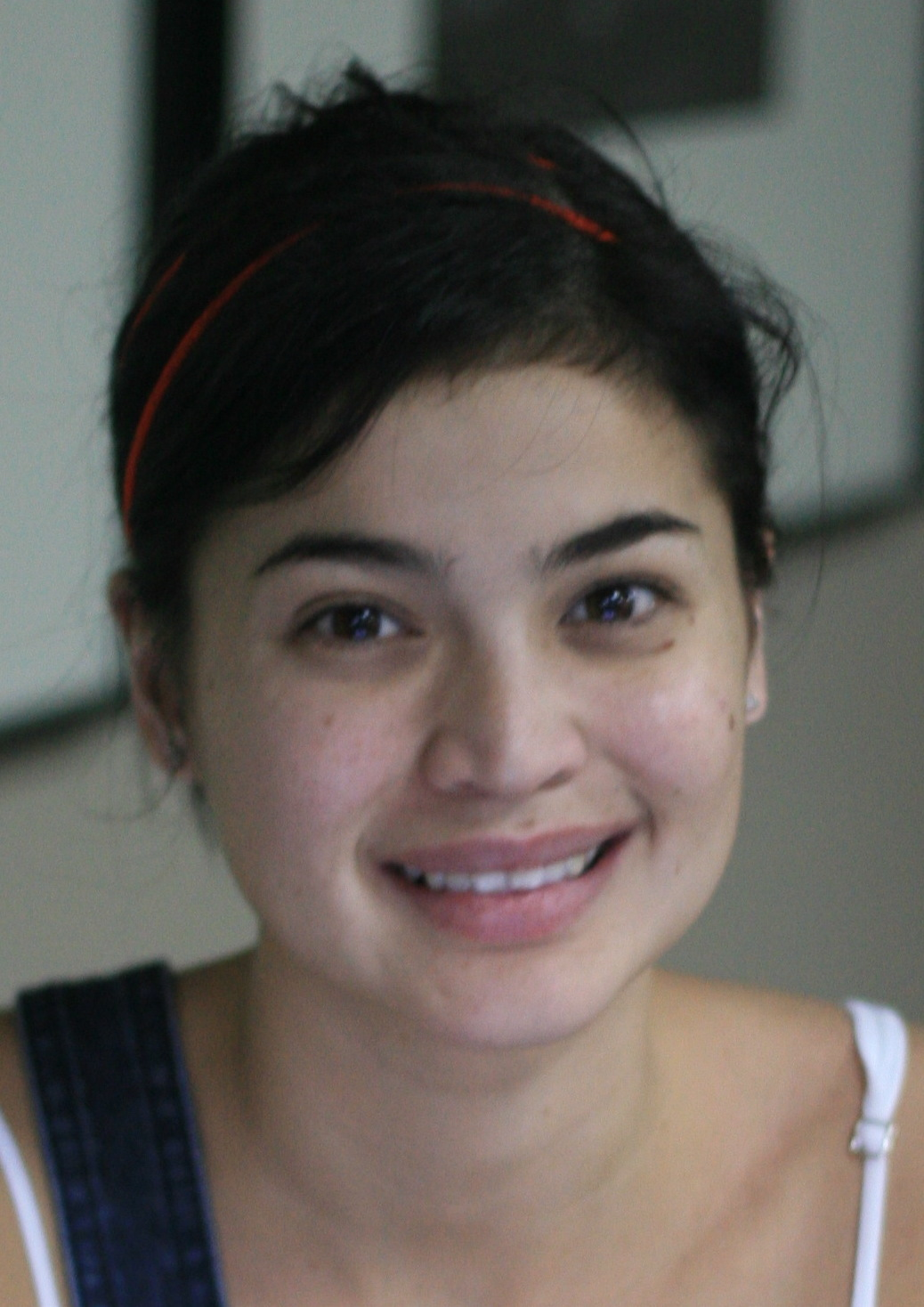
Anne Curtis

Lead cast

- Bong Revilla as Emilio V. Noble

Supporting cast

- Rufa Mae Quinto (2001–05) as Vivian
- Leo Martinez as Meynard Saturnino
- Jimmy Santos as Laki
- Earl Ignacio (2000–02) as Kiko
- Lana Asanin (2000–02) as Maricel
- Luz Valdez as Idang
- Katarina Perez as Gigi
- German Moreno as Moreno
- Jolo Revilla (2001–05) as Bong
- Miriam Quiambao (2000–01) as Bubot
- Cogie Domingo (2000–01) as Jerry
- Eddie Garcia (2001) as Ka Edong
- Antonio Aquitania (2002–05) as Tonying
- K Brosas
- Anne Curtis
- Steven Claude Goyong
- Bryan Revilla
- Robert Ortega

== Accolades ==
Accolades received by Idol Ko si Kap
Year	Award	Category	Recipient	Result	Ref.
2005	Golden Screen TV Awards	Outstanding Comedy Series	Idol Ko si Kap	Nominated	
2005	Golden Screen TV Awards	Outstanding Lead Actor in a Comedy Series	Bong Revilla	Nominated	
2005	Golden Screen TV Awards	Outstanding Lead Actress in a Comedy Series	Rufa Mae Quinto	Nominated	
2005	Golden Screen TV Awards	Outstanding Supporting Actor in a Comedy Series	Antonio Aquitania	Nominated	
2005	Golden Screen TV Awards	Outstanding Supporting Actress in a Comedy Series	K Brosas	Nominated	
