= Bitoy's Funniest Videos =

Philippine television comedy show

- Title card
- Also known as: Bitoy's Funniest Sitcoms
- Genre: Comedy
- Presented by: Michael V.
- Country of origin: Philippines
- Original language: Tagalog
- No. of episodes: 271

Production
- Camera setup: Single-camera setup
- Running time: 17–31 minutes
- Production company: GMA Entertainment TV

Original release
- Network: GMA Network
- Release: July 3, 2004 – October 10, 2009

Bitoy's Funniest Videos is a Philippine television comedy show broadcast by GMA Network. Hosted by Michael V., it premiered on July 3, 2004. The show concluded on October 10, 2009, with a total of 271 episodes.

The show is streaming online on YouTube.

== Hosts ==
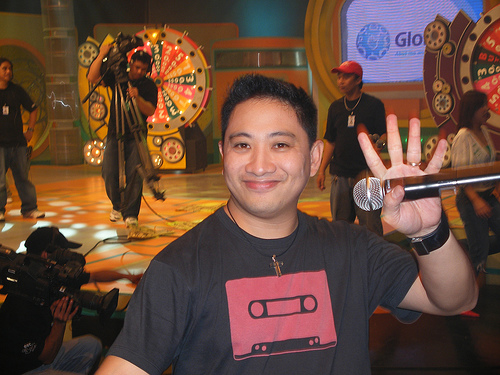
Michael V. serves as the host.

- Michael V.

Co-hosts

- Toni Gonzaga
- Karel Marquez
- K Brosas
- Yasmien Kurdi
- Michelle Madrigal
- Katrina Halili
- Pauleen Luna
- Jennylyn Mercado
- Iwa Moto
- Kris Bernal
- Jewel Mische
- Daiana Menezes

== Ratings ==
According to AGB Nielsen Philippines' Mega Manila household television ratings, the final episode of Bitoy's Funniest Videos scored a 17.2% rating.
