= Mahal Kita, Final Answer =

2002 romantic comedy film by Ike Jarlego Jr.

- Directed by: Ike Jarlego Jr.
- Written by: Mel Mendoza-del Rosario
- Produced by: Vincent del Rosario III
- Starring: Bong Revilla; Rufa Mae Quinto
- Cinematography: Eduardo Jacinto
- Edited by: Marya Ignacio
- Music by: Nonong Buencamino
- Production company: Viva Films
- Distributed by: Viva Films
- Release date: January 23, 2002
- Running time: 107 minutes
- Country: Philippines
- Language: Filipino

Mahal Kita, Final Answer is a 2002 Philippine romantic comedy film directed by Ike Jarlego Jr. and written by Mel Mendoza-del Rosario. The film stars Bong Revilla and Rufa Mae Quinto.

The film is streaming online on YouTube.

== Plot ==
Benito is a rich, playboy businessman afraid of commitment. Joanna is a "kontesera", a girl who eternally auditions in all types of contests (including joining the game show Who Wants to Be a Millionaire), only to end up failing each time. Their paths cross when Joanna applies for a job at Benito's company despite not being qualified. At first Benito rejects Joanna for the position of secretary but later on when he sees the stocks and sales graphics of his company declining when Joanna leaves, he asks Joanna to come back and get hired after seeing the graphics stay up. He slowly realizes Joanna is his lucky charm in life because it was only her who saves an investor from pulling out of his company, keeps on winning in high-stakes gambling with his friends, and straightened the problems confronting his houseboy Jimboy and stepsister Nanette.

But as the saying goes "luck runs out", Benito loses everything when Joanna leaves him to take care of a family emergency. The only people that stuck with him was Jimboy (who is now openly gay) and his family who never left his side. He was also convinced by his mother to start his business again after she revealed she never spent the monthly allotments sent to her through any of his emissaries, including Joanna. It was then Benito realized Joanna was more than just his lucky charm in life.

When Joanna joined Who Wants to Be a Millionaire for the second time as a contestant, she was able to answer all the questions correctly, winning the jackpot prize. But she was more than happy when Benito showed up in the studio to profess his love for her.

== Cast ==
- Bong Revilla as Benito Pinlac
- Rufa Mae Quinto as Joanna
- John Lapus as Jimboy
- Patricia Javier as Gwen
- Bobby Andrews as Kenneth
- Anne Curtis as Nanette
- Berting Labra as Jose
- Janice Jurado as Anabel
- Eddie Arenas as Benito's stepfather
- Marita Zobel as Benito's mother
- Jeanette Diaz as Wenn
- Chubi del Rosario as Jojo
- Mandy Ochoa as Benito's friend
- Edwin Reyes as Benito's friend
- James Sicangco as Benito's friend
- Mon Confiado as Sarhento
- Shanah Caratiquet as Joanna's sister
- O.J. Jacinto as Joanna's sister
- Christopher de Leon as himself, hosting Who Wants to Be a Millionaire? (cameo)

== See also ==
- Slumdog Millionaire - a film with different plot but features Wants to Be a Millionaire in it.
