= Tata Esteban =

Filipino producer-director

- Born: Steve Paolo Regala; September 28, 1954; Manila, Philippines
- Died: September 10, 2003 (aged 48); Commonwealth Avenue, Quezon City, Philippines
- Occupations: Film director, film producer, actor
- Years active: 1980–2001
- Spouse: Imelda Sancho-Regala
- Children: 6

Tata Esteban (born Steve Paolo Regala; September 28, 1954 – September 10, 2003) was a Filipino producer-director. He is known for the critically acclaimed 1984 film Alapaap and production of Philippine bold films.

== Education ==
Esteban had a double major for his undergraduate degree in Business and Hotel and Restaurant Management obtained at the University of Baguio

== Personal life and death ==
Esteban had a son with actress Tanya Gomez on December 27, 1985.

Esteban died on September 10, 2003, from a heart attack.

== Filmography ==
=== Director ===
Year	Title
1982	Kiskisan
1982	Kaskasero
1983	Hubo
1984	Alapaap
1985	Hubo sa Dilim
1986	Flesh Avenue
1986	Materyales Fuertes
1986	Salamangkero
1987	Diwata
1987	Mga Lihim ng Kalapati
1989	Gabriela
1992	Engkanto
1995	Gayuma
1997	Akin Ka Lamang
1998	Init ng Laman
1999	Dalagang Dagat
1999	Ibibigay Ko ang Lahat
2000	Fidel Jimenez: Magkasubukan Tayo
2001	Tabi Tabi Po! (segment "Engkantada")

=== Actor ===
Year	Title	Role
1980	Bongga Ka Day!	
1981	Kontrobersyal	actor
1981	Mahinhin vs. Mahinhin	actor
1981	Dear Heart	
1981	Caught in the Act	
1982	Karibal Ko ang Aking Ina	
1984	Snake Sisters	
1994	The Secrets of Sarah Jane: Sana'y Mapatawad Mo	Prison boss
1995	Sa Ngalan ng Pag-Ibig	commercial boss

=== Writer ===
Year	Title
1983	Kaskasero
1986	Salamangkero
1989	Gabriela
1998	Init ng Laman
1999	Ibibigay Ko ang Lahat

=== Production designer ===
Year	Title
1984	Snake Sisters
1984	Alapaap
1985	Hubo sa Dilim
1994	The Secrets of Sarah Jane: Sana'y Mapapatawad Mo

=== Producer ===
Year	Title
1986	Flesh Avenue
1986	Materyales Fuertes

=== Creative consultant ===
Year	Title
2001	Tabi-Tabi Po!

=== Fight director ===
Year	Title
1998	Init ng Laman

=== Assistant director ===
Year	Title
1988	Mannigan's Force

=== Composer ===
Year	Title
1987	Diwata
