= K Brosas =

Filipina actress and singer

Kakai "K" Brosas
- Born: Maria Carmela Brosas; July 15, 1975 (age 51); Borongan, Eastern Samar, Philippines
- Occupations: Actress comedian singer television host
- Years active: 2000–present
- Agents: GMA Artist Center (2000–2008); Cornerstone Entertainment (2014–present)
- Children: Crystal Brosas
- Website: www.wapak.biz

Maria Carmela Brosas (born July 15, 1975), better known by her screen name Kakai or K Brosas, is a Filipino actress, comedian, singer and television host. She was born in the Philippines to an American father and a Filipino mother and was a band member of Gladys & the Boxers and was lead singer when the group performed as K & the Boxers with music director Samuel Cruz Valdecantos, bassist Nolit Abanilla, drummer Solomon Valdecantos and guitarist Eric Tuazon. In mid-2010, she became a co-host on the game show Pilipinas Win na Win.

== Biography ==
=== Early life ===
Brosas was born in Borongan, Eastern Samar to a Filipino mother and an American father, who she never knew. At a young age, her family transferred to Manila. She finished high school at St. Paul University Quezon City where she enrolled in an undergraduate B.S. Tourism course.

=== Personal life ===
Brosas' only daughter, Crystal, came out as lesbian in July 2020. Her daughter is currently in a relationship with her non-showbiz girlfriend, Zhyzhia, which Brosas fully supports.

== Filmography ==
=== Film ===
Year	Title	Role
2009	Tenement 2	Melissa
2009	Ang Tanging Pamilya: A Marry Go Round	Deling kakanin
2012	ÜnOfficially Yours	Vivora
2012	The Mistress	Rosa
2013	Call Center Girl	Lolay
2017	Northern Lights: A Journey to Love	Arlene
2021	Will You Marry?	Honey

=== Television ===
Year	Title	Role
2000	Idol Ko Si Kap	
2001–2003	Eat Bulaga!	Herself / Co-host
2001	Ikaw Lang ang Mamahalin	Flor
2004	Bitoy's Funniest Videos	Herself / Co-host
2004	Magpakailanman: The Kakai "K" Brosas Story	Herself
2004	SiS	Herself / Guest
2004	Extra Challenge	Herself / Guest co-host
2004	Marinara	Sushi Lou
2005	Hokus Pokus	Toni
2005	Darna	Divina Demonica
2006	HP: Ibang Level Na!	Toni
2007	HP: To the Highest Level Na!	Toni
2007	Super Twins	Akika
2007	All Star K!	Herself / Guest
2007	SOP Rules	Herself / Co-host
2008	Marimar	Rowena
2008	My Girl	Tessie Legaspi
2009	Lovers in Paris	Michelle
2009	Rated K	Herself
2010	IDOL	Antonia "Toyang" Timbales
2010	Pilipinas Win Na Win	Herself / Co-host
2010	Laugh Out Loud	Herself
2010	Showtime	Herself (Appears in "Huliin ang Bituin" segment)
2011	Talentadong Pinoy	Herself / Judge
2011	Showtime	Herself / Guest judge
2011–2012	Maria la del Barrio	Carlotta
2011	Entertainment Live	Herself / Host
2013	Wansapanataym: Ang Batang Buhawi	Maring
2014	Maalaala Mo Kaya: Santan	Neneng
2014	Tunay na Buhay	Herself
2014–2015	Quiet Please!: Bawal ang Maingay	Herself / Host
2015	3-in-1	Host
2015	Kris TV	Guest co-host
2016–2020	It's Showtime	Judge in Tawag ng Tanghalan
2020	Bangon Talentadong Pinoy	Herself / Guest Talent scout
2020–2022	Lunch Out Loud	Herself / Host
2021–2022; 2025–2026	Sing Galing!	Herself / Host
2024–2025	Ang Himala ni Niño: Unang Libro ng Niña Niño	Gregoria "Gege"
2026	A Secret in Prague	Donabel Valtrovi
