= Masikip sa Dibdib: The Boobita Rose Story =

Masikip sa Dibdib
- DVD release cover
- Directed by: Bb. Joyce Bernal
- Written by: Mel Mendoza-Del Rosario
- Produced by: Vic del Rosario, Jr.; Rufa Mae Quinto
- Starring: Rufa Mae Quinto; Antonio Aquitania; Gina Pareño; John Lapus; Sunshine Dizon
- Cinematography: Niel Daza
- Edited by: Renato de Leon
- Music by: Chuckie Dreyfus; Jun Regalado
- Production company: Viva Films
- Distributed by: Viva Films; Media Asia Films
- Release date: April 14, 2004 (Philippines)
- Country: Philippines
- Language: Filipino

Masikip sa Dibdib (English: Tight in the Chest, also known as Boobita Rose... Masikip sa Dibdib) is a 2004 Filipino satirical comedy film, directed by Joyce E. Bernal. The film was released to Philippine theaters on April 14, 2004. It stars Rufa Mae Quinto as the title character and in her second collaborative effort with Bernal since the 2001 film Booba. Quinto also served as producer together with Viva Films. The film was released on video under the title Masikip sa Dibdib: Ang Tunay na Buhay ni Boobita Rose.

The film satirizes stereotypical Filipino melodramas where a resilient central character, usually living in poverty bears the problem of raising an otherwise ungrateful family. The film is also famous for featuring cameos of Filipino singers Regine Velasquez, Ogie Alcasid, Lani Misalucha, Ely Buendia, Martin Nievera and many more lip-synching during the dramatic scenes for added comic relief.

== Plot ==
With the weight of problematic family members: alcoholic née suicidal sister Brigitte (Sunshine Dizon), a womanizing addict brother Bogs (John Lapus), a nymphomaniac mother Lupe (Gina Pareño), and a socially challenged lovelife Mark (Rudy Hatfield) hanging on her shoulders, Boobita Rose (Rufa Mae Quinto) breaks down by breaking into a song. However, she proves to be a tough cookie to crumble and gamely deals with her tribulations through a roller coaster ride of laugh and tears.

== Cast ==
- Rufa Mae Quinto as Boobita Rose: A hardworking, physically gifted girl and breadwinner of a dysfunctional unappreciative family.
- Antonio Aquitania as Randy
- Gina Pareño as Lupe: Boobita's mother who is a nymphomaniac and self-pitying mess. Pareño is known for easily switching from drama to comedy when the situation calls for it.
- John Lapus as Bogs: Boobita's drug-addicted womanizer brother who gets girls pregnant. He has love scenes with no less than three Viva Hot Babes, namely Andrea del Rosario, Ella V. and Gwen Garci. Lapus is a confirmed gay, but he said he got “turned on” with Ella V.
- Sunshine Dizon as Brigitte: Boobita's alcoholic sister, a role Dizon said she never thought she’d play. She stated, "[The role is] So opposite of the real me that’s why it’s very challenging.”
- Phytos Kyriacou as Boogie
- Tita Swarding as Lolo Benito: the family’s drunkard grandfather, a ‘straight’ role, contrary to Swarding's real gay self.
- Rudy Hatfield as Mark
- Jannica Pareno as Mark's wife
- Kier Legaspi as Lupe's boyfriend
- Bernard Bonnin as Bogart: Lupe's husband who comes back to her only when he runs out of money. Otherwise, he’s with different women. Bonnin expressed “First time I’m doing this kind of comedy. I like it.”
- Charlie Davao as Senator
- Chinggoy Alonso as Boss
- Raquel Montessa as Boss' wife
- Ralion Alonso as Boss' son
- Earl Ignacio as Teacher
- Lui Manansala as Principal

=== Singers ===
- Bituin Escalante (performed "Lupa")
- Blakdyak (performed "Don't Do That, Joey")
- Salbakuta (performed "Long Distance")
- Ogie Alcasid (performed "Huwag Ka Lang Mawawala")
- Lani Misalucha (performed "Tila")
- Regine Velasquez (performed "Saan Ako Nagkamali")
- Mark Bautista (performed "Kapag Ako'y Kailangan")
- Sarah Geronimo (performed "Ibulong sa Hangin" and "You Are My Song")
- Karylle (performed "Breaking My Heart")
- Kyla (performed "Maghihintay Lamang")
- Anna Fegi (performed "Wala Ka Na")
- Nina (performed "What If")
- Ely Buendia (performed "Keeper")
- Martin Nievera (performed "You Are My Song")

=== Cameo appearances ===
- Andrea del Rosario
- Bobby Andrews
- Kristine Jaca
- Gwen Garci

== Soundtrack ==
Songs were released by VIVA Records. Ogie Alcasid composed the main theme "Masikip sa Dibdib" which was sung by Quinto.

1. "Masikip sa Dibdib" by Rufa Mae Quinto
2. "Perfecto" by Rufa Mae Quinto
3. "Bitin na Bitin" by Rufa Mae Quinto
