= Hula Mo, Huli Ko =

2002 action film by Edgardo "Boy" Vinarao

- Directed by: Edgardo "Boy" Vinarao
- Screenplay by: Senen Dimaguila; Humilde "Meek" Roxas
- Story by: Senen Dimaguila
- Produced by: Victoria Lorna Fernandez
- Starring: Rudy Fernandez; Rufa Mae Quinto
- Cinematography: Romulo Araojo
- Edited by: Along Vinarao
- Music by: Nonong Buencamino
- Production company: Reflection Films
- Distributed by: Reflection Films
- Release date: December 25, 2002
- Running time: 100 minutes
- Country: Philippines
- Language: Filipino
- Box office: ₱10,334,808.45

Hula Mo, Huli Ko is a 2002 Filipino action film directed by Edgardo "Boy" Vinarao and starring Rudy Fernandez and Rufa Mae Quinto. It was one of the entries at the 2002 Metro Manila Film Festival.

== Cast ==
- Rudy Fernandez as Sgt. Randy Tuazon
- Rufa Mae Quinto as Paula
- Carlos Morales as Dr. Franco
- Mike Gayoso as Jack
- Alvin Anson as Clinton
- Mely Tagasa as Lola Apols
- Gerald Ejercito as Gerry
- Jenine Desiderio as Viola
- Patrick Dela Rosa as Brix
- Menggie Cobarrubias as Chief Veloso
- Mar Garchitorena as Remo
- Romy Mallari as Hostage Taker
- Mel Kimura as Hostage Taker's Wife
- Jasmin Reyes as Elena
- Boy Roque as Gary
- Joey Padilla as Arthur
- Arnel Acuba as Afable
- Bon Vibar as Priest
- Albert Zialcita as Pastor
- Robert Rivera as Congressman
- Gemalyn Estrada as Lover Girl
- Nico Quintana as Lover Boy
- Duarte Armea as Roomboy
- Arleen de Leon as De Leon

== Production ==
The film had the working title Uno Corinto. Maricel Soriano at Judy Ann Santos were initially offered to play the leading lady in the film, but respectively turned it down due to scheduling conflicts, with the former busy shooting with fellow entry Mano Po. The role eventually went to Rufa Mae Quinto, as suggested by Bong Revilla.

== Accolades ==
Year	Awards	Category	Recipient	Result	Ref.
2002	28th Metro Manila Film Festival	Best Picture	Hula Mo, Huli Ko	Nominated	
2002	28th Metro Manila Film Festival	Best Actor	Rudy Fernandez	Nominated	
2002	28th Metro Manila Film Festival	Best Actress	Rufa Mae Quinto	Nominated	
2002	28th Metro Manila Film Festival	Best Sound Engineering	Nestor Mutia	Won	
