= Ispup =

Philippine sketch comedy show

- "Walang Pikunan, Ispup Onli"
- Also known as: Ispup Atbp. (2003-04)
- Genre: Sketch comedy, Gags
- Created by: Associated Broadcasting Company
- Directed by: Al Quinn
- Creative director: Ronnie Tumbokon
- Starring: Leo Martinez; Candy Pangilinan; Willie Nepomuceno; Jon Santos; Various contributors
- Theme music composer: Quincy Jones
- Opening theme: "Soul Bossa Nova"
- Ending theme: "Soul Bossa Nova"
- Country of origin: Philippines
- Original language: Filipino
- No. of seasons: 19
- No. of episodes: 251

Production
- Executive producer: Mon Del Rosario Torres
- Producers: Vivian C. Recio; Anthony Pastorpide
- Production locations: ABC 5 Studios; Novaliches, Quezon City
- Running time: 60 minutes
- Production company: ABC Entertainment Group

Original release
- Network: ABC 5
- Release: March 20, 1999 – February 15, 2004

Related
- Tropang Trumpo; PBA on ABC; Wow Mali; Teka Mona!; Lokomoko; Tropa Mo Ko Unli

Ispup (English: Spoof) is a Philippine television sketch comedy show broadcast by ABC.

The show was originally aired on Saturdays, began from March 20, 1999, to November 17, 2001, replacing Tropang Trumpo and moved to Fridays from November 23, 2001, to March 7, 2003, to compete with GMA 7's Bubble Gang. From March 16, 2003, to February 15, 2004, the show was reformatted with its new title Ispup Atbp. and moved to Sundays, replacing the former timeslot of The Price is Right and was replaced by PBA on ABC.

The program was known for its extensive use of political satire and parodies poking fun at various aspects of Filipino and occasionally foreign pop culture, solely focusing on the popularity and sometimes notoriety of celebrities, television shows, and political figures. When the show was reformatted in 2003, original sketches were added.

== Cast ==
=== Main cast ===
- Willie Nepomuceno
- Leo Martinez (2000–2004)
- Candy Pangilinan
- Jon Santos

=== Extended cast ===
- Caloy Alde
- Mystica (2000–2003)
- Madeleine Nicholas
- Rufa Mae Quinto (1999–2001)
- Raffy Rodriguez
- Marissa Sanchez
- Selina Sevilla
- Joy Viado (1999–2004)
- Angel Locsin (2002)
- Dingdong Avanzado
- Laarni Rivera

=== The Ispupniks ===
- Mike "Pekto" Nacua (who was later discovered by GMA Network as one of its comedians)
- Marvin Martinez a.k.a. Ate Shawie (gay impersonator of Sharon Cuneta)
- Manuel Papillera a.k.a. Ate Guy (gay impersonator of Nora Aunor)
- Hyubs Azarcon
- Cynthia Marquez

=== Guest casts ===
- Allan K.
- Joji Isla
- Lou Veloso
- Pepe Pimentel
- Rey Malonzo
- Onyok Velasco
- Khalil Kaimo
- Snooky Serna
- Dominic Ochoa
- Dingdong Dantes
- Maui Taylor

== Parodies ==
Before and after the show's duration, a disclaimer was presented in the style of the Star Wars opening crawl to the music of Carl Orff's Carmina Burana, stating that the parodies were taken from television shows, commercials, and movies with permission, ending up as the show's tagline: "Walang pikunan, ispup onli." which literally translate into "Do not be offended, it's only a spoof."

- Alam Morena Clara - a parody of the telenovela Morena Clara
- Ang Sangang Daan (lit. 'The Branched-Out Path') - a parody of religious program Ang Dating Daan (lit. 'The Old Road') and its rival Ang Tamang Daan (lit. 'The Right Road'), hosted by John Lapus and Leo Martinez
- Balitang Ka!/Balitang Y2K (lit. 'You're the News!/Y2K News') - a parody of ABS-CBN public affairs program Balitang K
- Bituin La Fea (lit. 'The Ugly Star')- a parody of the Colombian telenovela Betty, La Fea (lit. 'Betty the Ugly')
- Blick - a parody of GMA youth-oriented show Click
- The Cheapest Link - a parody of the Philippine version of the UK game show The Weakest Link, with actors playing political figures as contestants.
- Chugilita - a parody of the telenovela Chabelita
- Crispy Per Minute - a parody of ABS-CBN showbiz-oriented show Cristy Per Minute (the latter became a radio program, which currently airs over 105.9 True FM).
- ‘Di Bati sina Mards at Pards (lit. 'Sis and Bro are at Loggerheads') - a parody of the GMA public affairs program Debate with Mare at Pare (lit. 'Debate with Sis and Bro')
- Empty V/NTV - a parody of the music channel MTV
- Familiar Feud - parody of the Philippine version of US game show Family Feud which was aired on the same network, ABC in 2001–2002, GMA in 2008–2011 and 2022–present, and ABS-CBN in 2016–2017.
- Gay KNB? (lit. 'Are You Now Gay?') - a parody of ABS-CBN game show Game KNB? (lit. 'Are You Now Game?')
- Intrigador (lit. 'Intriguer') - a parody of GMA public affairs program Imbestigador (lit. 'Investigator')
- Kirira: Ano ang Kulay ng Pinipig? (lit. 'Kirira: What is the Color of Pinipig?') - a parody of TAPE Inc. and GMA's teledrama Kirara: Ano ang Kulay ng Pag-ibig? (lit. 'Kirara: What is the Color of Love?')
- Knowless Power - a parody of Knowledge Power
- Lagot Ka Kay Tolfu! (lit. 'You'll Pay to Tolfu!') - a parody of RPN public affairs program Isumbong Mo Kay Tulfo (lit. 'Complain to Tulfo')
- Magandang Gabi Ba 'Yan (lit. 'Is It a Good Evening') - a parody of ABS-CBN magazine program Magandang Gabi, Bayan. (lit. 'Good Evening, Nation')
- Magpalakad-lakad man (lit. 'Walking Aimlessly') - a spoof anthology segment of GMA show Magpakailanman (lit. 'Forevermore')
- Malala Na Kaya (lit. 'Is It Worse') - another spoof anthology segment of ABS-CBN show Maalaala Mo Kaya (lit. 'Can You Remember')
- Master Siopao - a parody of GMA late night variety show Master Showman Presents.
- Medyo Alas Singko Y Medya (lit. 'Nearly Five Thirty') - a parody of ABS-CBN morning show Alas Singko Y Medya. (lit. 'Five Thirty')
- MKB - a parody of ABS-CBN noontime variety show MTB.
- Morning Gays - a parody of ABS-CBN talk show Morning Girls.
- Mula Sa Pusa (lit. 'From The Cat') - a parody of ABS-CBN teleserye Mula sa Puso (lit. 'From The Heart').
- Munch - a parody of the GMA talk show Brunch.
- No One Can Be A Millionaire? - a parody of the Philippine version of the UK game show Who Wants to Be a Millionaire?, with actors playing celebrities and political figures as contestants, none of whom win the ultimate prize.
- Oka-Toka-Doc - a cross-over parody of ABS-CBN shows !Oka Tokat and Oki Doki Doc
- Palpakners Jay and Mel (lit. 'Failed Partners Mel and Jay') - a parody of GMA Sunday talk show Partners Mel and Jay
- Palso: Action Balita (lit. 'Fake: Action News') - a parody of ABS-CBN newscast Pulso: Aksyon Balita (lit. 'Pulse: Action News')
- Pangako Sa Yo Sa Puso Ko Iibigan Kita Hanggang Sa Dulo ng Walang Hanggan (lit. 'I Promise To You In My Heart I Will Love You Until The End of Eternity') - a cross-over parody of three ABS-CBN teleseryes.
- Pinoy Over Exposed - a parody of ABS-CBN reality show Pinoy Exposed.
- The Priest is Right - a parody of the Philippine version of the US game show The Price Is Right which was aired on ABC 5 in 2001–2003, hosted by Willie Nepomuceno as His Eminems Jaime Cardinal Sins and actors playing political figures as contestants.
- Pulpol (lit. 'Stupid') - a parody of ABS-CBN telemagazine show Pipol (lit. 'People')
- Rosalinta - a parody of Rosalinda played by Rufa Mae Quinto impersonating Thalía. The name is a parody of Rosalinda and linta (lit. 'leech')
- Sailor Quarter Moon - a parody of the Japanese superheroine anime Sailor Moon
- Sports Ang Limited (lit. 'Sports Is Limited') - a parody of ABS-CBN sports program Sports Unlimited.
- StarTruck - a parody of GMA talent search program StarStruck
- Stirtalk - a parody of GMA showbiz-oriented show Startalk.
- Taksil! (lit. 'Traitor!') - a parody of GMA newscast Saksi (lit. 'Witness')
- Today with K - a parody of ABS-CBN talk show Today with Kris Aquino
- Usapang Monkey Business (lit. 'Monkey Business Talk') - a parody of ABS-CBN public affairs program Usapang Business (lit. 'Business Talk')
- The Tooth and Nothing But the Tooth - a parody of entertainment talk show The Truth and Nothing But
- What if... - a spoof where different personalities would be like.
- Wheel of Misfortune or Will of Fortune - parody of the Philippine version of Wheel of Fortune which was aired on ABC 5 in 2001–2002.
- Wrong Page: Ulat ni Mel Tiongke (lit. 'Wrong Page: Report by Mel Tiongke') - a parody of GMA newscast Frontpage: Ulat ni Mel Tiangco (lit. 'Frontpage: Report by Mel Tiangco')
- Several commercial parodies

Lucky Me!, a popular noodle brand, and Gilbey's Gin also sponsored spoof portions of this program with permission. As a result of growing popularity, Gilbey's Gin and Ispup made a promo for the best Gilbey's spoof in 2002.

== Impersonations ==
- Kurita Chances - from ABS-CBN presenter Korina Sanchez, played by Rufa Mae Quinto
- Royet de Leon - from Christopher de Leon, played by Leo Martinez
- Mike Enrequiestas - from broadcaster Mike Enriquez, played by Leo Martinez. The surname may be a reference to comedian Rene Requiestas
- Osang Enriques - from GMA News reporter Susan Enriquez, played by Mystica. The name "Osang" also refers to Rosanna Roces
- Sherap Entrada - from president Joseph Estrada, played by Willie Nepomuceno, and later Jon Santos
- Kirira - from Philippine drama Kirara, played by Candy Pangilinan
- Senator Koren or Loren Lagarista - from Senator Loren Legarda.
- Cong. Manhik-Manaog - a character popularized by Leo Martinez, who used to be a co-star to Mr. Shooli (played by Jun Urbano) in Mongolian Barbecue, was reprised in Ispup through the Barangay Gaya-Gaya segment
- Ka Hermie Barong - from weather anchor Ernie Baron, played by Caloy Alde
- Edu Manzanas or Dudes - from Edu Manzano, played by Leo Martinez.
- Ches Melon- from ABS-CBN News anchor Ces Drilon, played by Candy Pangilinan
- Tita Cory Pepino - from president Corazon Aquino, played by Madeleine Nicolas. Tita means "aunt" in Filipino.
- Kris Pepino - from Kris Aquino, played by Rufa Mae Quinto, later replaced by Candy Pangilinan after Quinto left the show for Bubble Gang in 2001.
- Ramon Revillame or Bong Gabilla - from former action star and senator Ramon Revilla Sr. The surname may be a reference to Willie Revillame
- Charing Todos Los Santos Conscious na Conscious (lit. 'Kidding All Saints Extremely Conscious') - from TV executive Charo Santos-Concio, played by Jon Santos
- David Semplang - from Battle of the Brains presenter and ANC anchor David Celdran, played by Jon Santos. Semplang means "to trip" or "fall down" in Filipino.
- His Eminems Jaime Cardinal Sins - from Manila Archbishop Cardinal Jaime Sin.
- Mel Tiongke - from GMA News anchor Mel Tiangco, played by Candy Pangilinan
- Mayor Vi - from actress and Batangas representative Vilma Santos, played by Jon Santos
- Bogie Molcasid - from Ogie Alcasid played by Leo Martinez
- Gloring Macabagal-Barroyo - from President Gloria Macapagal Arroyo played by Candy Pangilinan
- Nur Miswa - from MNLF chair Nur Misuari played by Willie Nepomuceno
- Inday Garutay - from television host Inday Badiday
- Hairy Potter - from the movie character Harry Potter played by Khali Kaimo.

== Anniversary Editions ==
- Gawad Yarian Awards (lit. 'Screwed Awards Awards') - 1st Anniversary. Parody of Gawad Urian (lit. 'Gold Awards'). (2000)
- Ispup Power 2 - 2nd Anniversary. Parody of People Power 2 against the ousted president Joseph Estrada. (2001)
- Ispup KNB? (lit. 'Are You Now Ispup?') - 3rd Anniversary. Parodies of several Game Shows aired on Philippine Television. (2002)

== See also ==
- List of TV5 (Philippine TV network) original programming
- Tropang Trumpo
- Lokomoko U
- Tropa Mo Ko Unli
- Sic O'Clock News
