= HP: To the Highest Level Na! =

Philippine television sitcom series

- Title card
- Also known as: Hokus Pokus
- Genre: Sitcom
- Starring: Bong Revilla, Jr.
- Country of origin: Philippines
- Original language: Tagalog
- No. of episodes: 92

Production
- Camera setup: Multiple-camera setup
- Running time: 45 minutes
- Production company: GMA Entertainment TV

Original release
- Network: GMA Network
- Release: September 3, 2005 – July 14, 2007

HP: To the Highest Level Na! (formerly Hokus Pokus) is a Philippine television sitcom series broadcast by GMA Network. Starring Bong Revilla, Jr., it premiered on September 3, 2005 on the network's KiliTV line up. The series concluded on July 14, 2007, with a total of 92 episodes.

== Cast and characters ==
Cast

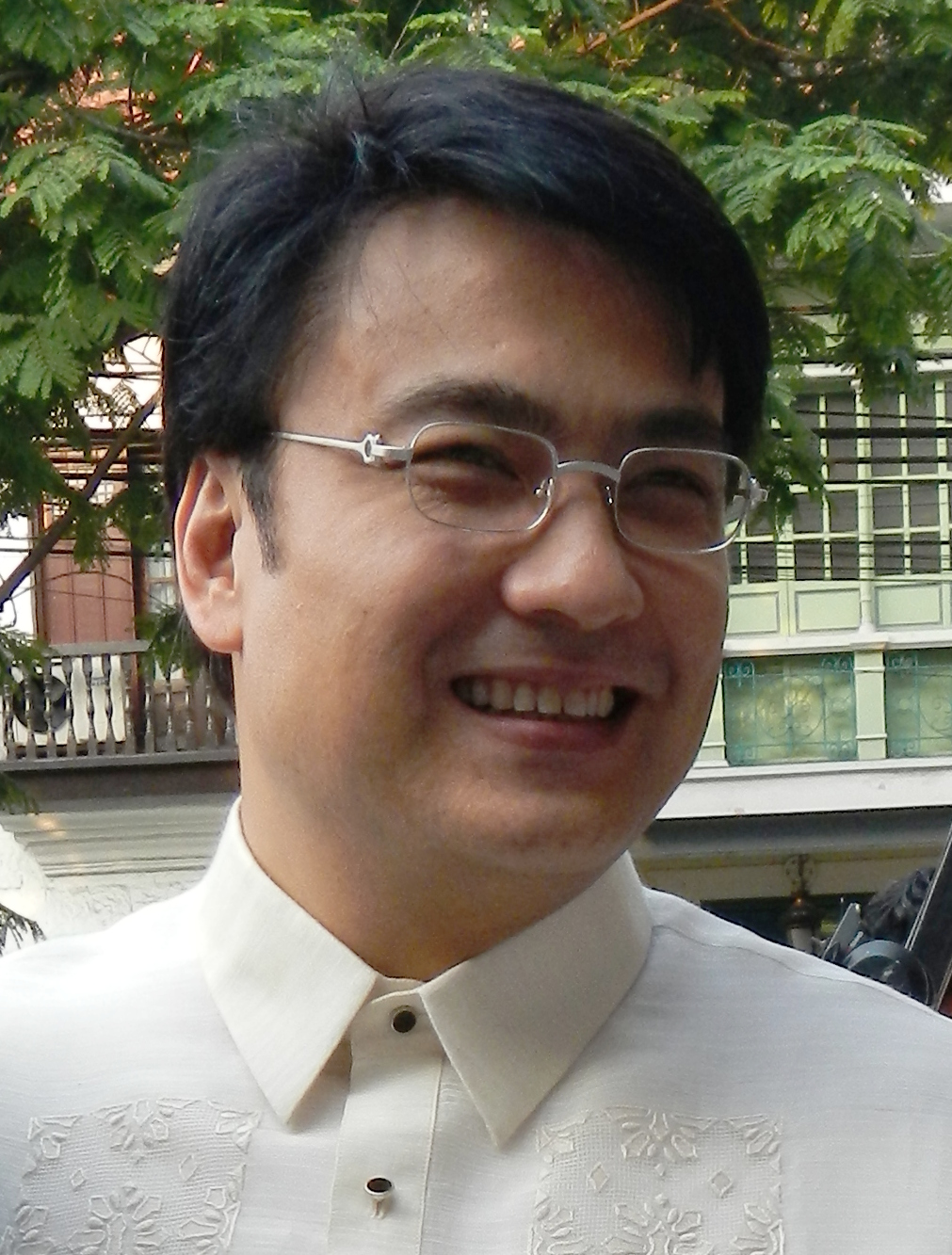
Bong Revilla

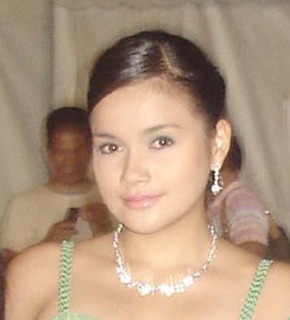
Yasmien Kurdi

Lead cast

- Bong Revilla as Abel

Supporting cast

- Rufa Mae Quinto as Candy
- Leo Martinez as Hugo
- K Brosas as Toni
- Jolo Revilla as Joko
- Yasmien Kurdi as Jackie
- Rainier Castillo as Prince
- Antonio Aquitania as Caloy
- Diego Llorico as Diday

== Accolades ==
Accolades received by Hokus Pokus
Year	Award	Category	Recipient	Result	Ref.
2006	20th PMPC Star Awards for Television	Best Comedy Actress	Rufa Mae Quinto	Nominated	
