= Sic O'Clock News =

- Genre: Political satire news, Comedy
- Written by: Amado Lacuesta Jr. Jobart F. Bartolome; Tony Apon
- Directed by: Marilou Diaz-Abaya
- Starring: Jaime Fabregas; Ces Quesada; Efren Reyes Jr. Manny Castañeda; Junix Inocian; Joji Isla; Hero Bautista; Rene Requiestas; Wilson Go; Jon Achaval; Celeste Bueno; Dina Padilla; Errol Dionisio; Ching Arellano; Khryss Adalia; Nonoy Oplas; Nonie Buencamino; Domeng Landicho
- Composer: Nonong Buencamino
- Country of origin: Philippines
- Original language: Filipino

Production
- Executive producers: Gem Cabrera; Lily Yap
- Editors: Marilou Diaz-Abaya; Rey Lugo; Wilson Dalit
- Running time: 60 minutes
- Production company: IBC Entertainment Group

Original release
- Network: Intercontinental Broadcasting Corporation
- Release: January 4, 1987 – September 15, 1990

Related
- May Tamang Balita (GMA News TV); BalitaOneNan (BuKo)

Sic O'Clock News is a Philippine television news satire show broadcast by IBC. Directed by Marilou Diaz-Abaya, it stars Jaime Fabregas, Efren Reyes Jr.,Ces Quesada, Manny Castañeda, Junix Inocian, Joji Isla, Hero Bautista, Rene Requiestas, Wilson Go, Jon Achaval, Celeste Bueno, Dina Padilla, Errol Dionisio, Ching Arellano, Khryss Adalia, Nonoy Oplas, Nonie Buencamino, Domeng Landicho. It aired from January 4, 1987, to September 15, 1990. The series was the first foray into comedy of director Marilou Diaz-Abaya, who had hitherto been known to make serious and adult-themed films, and also marked the acting debut of Ces Quesada.

== Cast ==
- Jimmy Fabregas as Sonny Esguerra (1987–1990)
- Ces Quesada as Lilian Polly Catubusan Labaybay (1987–1990)
- Efren Reyes Jr. (1987-1988)
- Hero Bautista (1988)
- Rene Requiestas (1987–1989)
- Junix Inocian (1988)
- Lou Veloso (1988)
- Manny Castañeda
- Joji Isla
- Wilson Go
- Jon Achaval
- Ching Arellano
- Pen Medina
- Errol Dionisio
- Celeste Bueno
- Dina Padilla
- Khryss Adalia
- Nonoy Oplas (1989–1990)
- Nonie Buencamino (1989–1990)
- Domeng Landicho (1989–1990)

== Characters ==
Characters	Parody of:	Actor
Marcurakus	Ferdinand Marcos	Joji Isla
Johnny Hindi Pala Rambo	Juan Ponce Enrile	Joji Isla
Kalan Gasera	Alan García	Joji Isla
General Nagyera	Manuel Noriega	Joji Isla
Presidentita	Corazon Aquino	Ces Quesada
Joyboy Ferdinandez	Jobo Fernandez	Jimmy Fabregas
Tserman Gorbachoy	Mikhail Gorbachev	Jimmy Fabregas
Howhowrel	Salvador Laurel	Jon Achaval
Karaoke (Note: A reference to Mitra's position as Speaker of the House of Representatives) Mitsa	Ramon Mitra Jr.	Jon Achaval
Syanny Jawosikorski	Robert Jaworski	Jon Achaval/Manny Castañeda
President Busabush	George H. W. Bush	Jon Achaval
Cardinal Din	Jaime Cardinal Sin	Wilson Go
Benjie Pagaspas	Benjie Paras	Wilson Go
Kunsumisisyuner May Press Kontratista	Mary Concepcion Bautista	Wilson Go
Fidel Daimos	Fidel V. Ramos	Errol Dionisio/Ching Arellano
Nabuko Takingshita	Noboru Takeshita	Errol Dionisio
July Kiliti	June Keithley	Manny Castañeda
Johnny Ang Mean Niya	Johnny Osmeña	Manny Castañeda
Secretary Bengbengzon	Alfredo Bengzon	Manny Castañeda
Mother Silly	Lily Monteverde	Manny Castañeda
Hin Wiko Alam	Philip Juico	Ching Arellano
Alvin Matrimonio	Alvin Patrimonio	Khryss Adalla

== Re-runs ==
Reruns of the series was aired on IBC from February 11 to July 19, 2019, along with Hapi House!, Retro TV and T.O.D.A.S..

Some episodes of the series were shown on IBC's archival program Retro TV (hosted by Drew Arellano), aired from November 17, 2003 to February 20, 2004.

== See also ==
- Abangan ang Susunod Na Kabanata
- May Tamang Balita
- Ispup
