= Rufa Mae Quinto =

Filipino actress and comedian (born 1978)

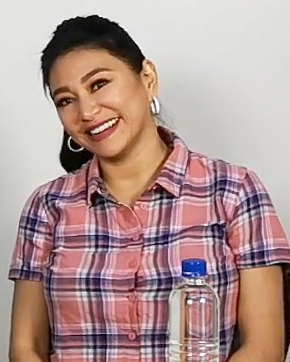
- Quinto in 2018
- Born: Rufa Mae Ocampo Quinto; May 28, 1978 (age 48); Angeles, Pampanga, Philippines
- Occupations: Actress; comedian; TV host; singer
- Years active: 1994–present
- Agents: Viva Entertainment (1996–2015) Regal Entertainment (2002–2009); GMA Artist Center (2022–present)
- Spouse: Trevor Magallanes (m. 2016; died 2025)
- Children: 1
- Relatives: Angeline Quinto (cousin)

YouTube information
- Channel: Rufa Mae Quinto
- Years active: 2018–present
- Genres: Travel; lifestyle; comedy
- Subscribers: 516 thousand
- Views: 23.2 million
- Last updated: August 4, 2026

Rufa Mae Ocampo Quinto-Magallanes (born May 28, 1978) is a Filipino actress, comedian, television presenter, and producer. Known for her camp and signature comedic performances in film and television, she has been cited as a notable figure in Philippine pop culture. Dubbed as the "Comedy Princess" by the media, she is a ten-time Best Comedy Actress winner at the Star Awards for Television, the most for any actress. Her other accolades include a Golden Screen Award and Best Supporting Actress at the PMPC Star Awards for Movies, in addition to a nomination for a FAMAS Award for Best Actress. In 2006, The Philippine Star named her one of the greatest comedians of all time.

== Career ==
=== 1994–1999: Beginnings and breakthrough ===
Quinto's show business career began in 1994, when she was offered a position by That's Entertainment. Her first film was Indecent Professor, starring Glydel Mercado, Amanda Page, and Michelle Parton. She then played supporting roles, until she got her first major role in the 1997 film Gloria, Gloria Labandera.

=== 2000–2009: Rise to prominence and popularity ===
Quinto continued to reach new career heights at the turn of the new millennium after starring in the romantic drama film Kailangan Ko'y Ikaw (2000). In 2001, her first big break was when she starred in a titular role in the blockbuster hit Booba, which remains one of her most popular films to date. Due to her screen popularity and voluptuous figure, she released her debut album Rated R that same year, which included the theme song of Booba. In 2003, she hosted the MTV Pilipinas Music Awards with Ogie Alcasid. In 2004, she landed another box-office hit Masikip sa Dibdib where she is credited as one of the producers of the film. The accompanying soundtrack of the film includes a song with Regine Velasquez doing the backing vocals. In 2005, she landed a Best Actress nomination at the prestigious FAMAS Awards for her performance in the film Mano Po 4: Ako Legal Wife, where she competed with the likes of Claudine Barretto and Irma Adlawan. At this point of her career, she has already worked with the likes of Rudy Fernandez, Robin Padilla, Bong Revilla, Regine Velasquez and Ai-Ai delas Alas. She would later star in Regal and GMA Films Desperadas series as a sex author in Desperadas and Desperadas 2 and produced her film Status Single through On-Q 28 productions. In 2009, FHM Philippines listed her among the Top 25 sexiest women of the decade.

=== 2010–2019: Established actress and continued success ===
With over 15 years of experience in the show business, Quinto has already established herself as a pop culture icon in the industry. In 2011, she starred in the sexy comedy film Temptation Island and was a box-office success. It earned a whooping ₱10 million in its first day, around ₱27.65 million in its first 5 days and has grossed ₱55.42 million within 2 weeks, becoming the 8th highest grossing domestic film of 2011. The next year, she tied with Pokwang on winning Best Comedy Actress at the 2012 PMPC Star Awards for her performance in the comedy show Bubble Gang.

=== 2020–present: Hiatus and comeback ===
In 2020, Quinto and her family moved to the United States. After two years of hiatus from show business, she made a comeback and signed a management contract with Sparkle GMA Artist Center. She landed a major role in the GTV's first family sitcom Tols. Not long after, she immediately made guest appearances on Mars Pa More and Family Feud. She top billed an episode for Tadhana with acclaimed actress Irma Adlawan. In 2023, Preview Magazine hailed Quinto as "The backbone of Filipino pop culture."

In 2025-2026, Quinto is one of the contestants of the fourth season of Your Face Sounds Familiar and ended up as the sixth placer.

== Reception and public image ==
Quinto has been regarded as one of the finest Filipino comedians in entertainment. She is commonly referred to by the media as the "Philippines Comedy Princess", lauded for her delivery of one-liners and portrayals of comic bombshell characters. Katrina Cabral from Preview Philippines wrote that Quinto's career is "tied to the backbone of Filipino pop culture", stressing the lasting appeal of her comedic acting performances to Millennials and Gen Z. Writing for the Philippine Daily Inquirer, Nestor Torre named Quinto, including the likes of Tessie Tomas, Eugene Domingo, Ai-Ai delas Alas, Mitch Valdes and Pokwang as one of the leading female performers in Philippine comedy, which Torre described as a field usually dominated by men. While Quinto is noted for her "uncanny ability to combine innocence with sensuality" in her screen performances, she has also earned praises for some of her roles outside comedy. Film director Mac Alejandre praised Quinto's acting abilities in the 2003 superhero film Captain Barbell, saying: "People may know Rufa Mae as a comedienne, but she’s actually a good actress."

Quinto has attracted media attention for her physical appearance. In 2010, she was named one the most physically attractive women of the decade by FHM Philippines. Her larger than life on-screen persona and signature comic lines is often the subject of parody and is frequently impersonated by various stand-up comedians among others. Stand-up comedian Rufa Mi gained fame from imitating Quinto's voice and mannerisms. In 2022, Drag performer Eva Le Queen impersonated Quinto in the sixth episode of the reality competition Drag Race Philippines. The following year, she served as a guest judge in the second season of Drag Den. Among the other Filipino personalities such as Vice Ganda, Julie Anne San Jose, have also impersonated Quinto in certain occasions.

== Personal life ==
Quinto is the daughter of Alexander Quinto and Fe Ann "Carol" Ocampo; they separated when she was only a year old. She is the second paternal cousin of singer and actress Angeline Quinto who was also in a relationship with her singer ex-boyfriend Erik Santos. She is also the second cousin of Jean Garcia, who also came from That's Entertainment, and the second-degree aunt of Jennica Garcia. She attended high school at St. Vincent School in Quezon City, where she was the valedictorian of her class.

From 1999 to 2000, Quinto dated singer-songwriter and politician Dingdong Avanzado. Quinto and ex-boyfriend Rudy Hatfield starred in Masikip sa Dibdib: The Boobita Rose Story as Boobita Rose and Mark, respectively. In 2004, they separated. She has also dated singer Erik Santos.

Quinto married financial analyst Trevor Magallanes on November 25, 2016 in Quezon City. The two had met in 2016, during Quinto's fifth visit in the United States. She gave birth to their first daughter Athena on February 18, 2017. Quinto and her daughter splits their time between the Philippines and the United States, where Magallanes was based. As of September 2020, she and her daughter had applied for a U.S. green card.

In December 2024, Magallanes said that they were seeking divorce. However, Quinto denied the claim the following month, while acknowledging that they were having problems in their relationship. Magallanes died in the United States in late July 2025 from undisclosed reasons.

=== Arrest warrant over fraud charges ===
In December 2024, an arrest warrant was issued against Quinto for violations of the Securities Regulation Code in a case that also saw the arrest of actress Neri Naig for fraud charges. In January 2025, she voluntarily surrendered to the NBI upon her return to the country and was released a day later after posting bail. The charges against her were dismissed due to a technicality in April 2025.

== Discography ==
- Rated R (2002)
- Masakip Sa Dibdib: Ang Tunay Na Buhay Ni Boobita Rose (2004)
- Four Sides of Rufa Mae (2008)

== Acting credits and awards ==
With more than 100 acting credits to her name, including 70 in films throughout her career spanning three decades, Quinto's most critically and commercially successful films include Gloria, Gloria Labandera (1997), Booba (2001), Super B (2002), Mahal Kita, Final Answer (2002), Masikip sa Dibdib (2004), Ako Legal Wife: Mano Po 4? (2005), Pasukob (2007), Desperadas (2007), Apat Dapat, Dapat Apat (2007), I.T.A.L.Y. (2008), Status: Single (2009) and Temptation Island (2011).

She is the most awarded leading comedy actress at the PMPC Star Awards for Television, winning seven times for her performances in Bubble Gang, and three additional wins for each of her roles in Ispup, Hokus Pokus and Home Sweetie Home. She has received the Star Award for Best Supporting Actress for her performance in Dahil May Isang Ikaw. Quinto was nominated for a Manila Film Festival for Best Actress for her performance in Super B and a nomination for a Metro Manila Film Festival for Best Actress for her role in Hula Mo, Huli Ko. In addition, for her role in the comedy film Ako Legal Wife: Mano Po 4?, she received her first FAMAS Award for Best Actress nomination.

Preceded by Jinri Park	FHM Cover Girl (September 2013)	Succeeded by Bangs Garcia
