= 17th PMPC Star Awards for Television =

- Date: October 11, 2003
- Location: UP Theater, Quezon City
- Hosted by: Kris Aquino; Boy Abunda; Lorna Tolentino; Bong Revilla; Charlene Gonzales; Paolo Bediones; Sharon Cuneta

Television/radio coverage
- Network: RPN
- Produced by: Airtime Marketing Philippines, Inc.

The 17th PMPC Star Awards for Television was held at the UP Theater, Quezon City on October 11, 2003, and broadcast on RPN Channel 9 on Saturday Night Playhouse. The awards night was hosted by Kris Aquino, Boy Abunda, Lorna Tolentino, Bong Revilla, Charlene Gonzales, Paolo Bediones and Sharon Cuneta and directed by Al Quinn with stage direction by Maribeth Bichara.

It is part of the "50 Years Philippine Television" celebration from February 9, 2003 to December 31, 2003.

== Nominees and winners ==
These were the nominations for the 17th Star Awards for Television. The winners are in bold and in the top of the list.

Network	Total # of Nominees
ABS-CBN	93
NBN	3
ABC	5
GMA	88
RPN	7
ZOE TV	5
IBC 13	13

Network	Total # of Winners (including Special Awards)
ABS-CBN	32
GMA	15

=== Best TV station ===
- **ABS-CBN-2**
- NBN-4
- ABC-5
- GMA-7
- RPN-9
- ZOE TV-11
- IBC-13

=== Best Drama Series ===
- Ang Iibigin Ay Ikaw (GMA 7)
- Bituin (ABS-CBN 2)
- Habang Kapiling Ka (GMA 7)
- **Kay Tagal Kang Hinintay (ABS-CBN 2)**
- Kung Mawawala Ka (GMA 7)

=== Best Drama Actress ===
- Bea Alonzo (Kay Tagal Kang Hinintay / ABS-CBN 2)
- Nora Aunor (Bituin / ABS-CBN 2)
- Angelika de la Cruz (Habang Kapiling Ka / GMA 7)
- Hilda Koronel (Kung Mawawala Ka / GMA 7)
- Rica Peralejo (Kay Tagal Kang Hinintay / ABS-CBN 2)
- **Snooky Serna (Habang Kapiling Ka / GMA 7)**
- Lorna Tolentino (Kay Tagal Kang Hinintay / ABS-CBN 2)

=== Best Drama Actor ===
- John Lloyd Cruz (Kay Tagal Kang Hinintay / ABS-CBN 2)
- Raymond Bagatsing (Kung Mawawala Ka / GMA 7)
- Christopher de Leon (Ang Iibigin Ay Ikaw / GMA 7)
- Chubi del Rosario (Ang Iibigin Ay Ikaw / GMA 7)
- **John Estrada (Kay Tagal Kang Hinintay / ABS-CBN 2)**
- Eddie Garcia (Kung Mawawala Ka / GMA 7)
- Patrick Garcia (Darating Ang Umaga / ABS-CBN 2)

=== Best Drama Anthology ===
- **Maalaala Mo Kaya (ABS-CBN 2)**
- Magpakailanman (GMA 7)

=== Best Single Performance by an Actress ===
- Nora Aunor (Maalaala Mo Kaya: Lubid / ABS-CBN 2)
- Matet de Leon (Maalaala Mo Kaya: Kubo / ABS-CBN 2)
- **Sunshine Dizon (Magpakailanman: Kakaibang Mukha ng Pag-ibig / GMA 7)**
- Jaclyn Jose (Maalaala Mo Kaya: Garapon / ABS-CBN 2)
- Jolina Magdangal (Magpakailanman: Pasakalye ng Isang Pangarap / GMA 7)
- **Cherry Pie Picache (Tanging Yaman, The Series: Sa Kandungan Mo Inay / ABS-CBN 2)**
- Maricel Soriano (Maalaala Mo Kaya: Sing-Along Bar / ABS-CBN 2)

=== Best Single Performance by an Actor ===
- **Carlo Aquino (Tanging Yaman, The Series: Sa Kandungan Mo Inay / ABS-CBN 2)**
- Raymond Bagatsing (Magpakailanman: May Liwanag Sa Dilim / GMA 7)
- Tirso Cruz III (Magpakailanman: Minsan May Isang Pangako / GMA 7)
- Dominic Ochoa (Maalaala Mo Kaya: Paper Dolls / ABS-CBN 2)
- Roderick Paulate (Maalaala Mo Kaya: Torotot / ABS-CBN 2)
- John Prats (Maalaala Mo Kaya: Garapon / ABS-CBN 2)

=== Best New Male TV Personality ===
- Marc Acueza (Maalaala Mo Kaya: Life Plan / ABS-CBN 2)
- Ketchup Eusebio (Maalaala Mo Kaya: Istatwa / ABS-CBN 2)
- **Luis Manzano (ASAP Mania / ABS-CBN 2)**
- Jay R (SOP / GMA 7)
- Brad Turvey (Kahit Kailan / GMA 7)

=== Best New Female TV Personality ===
- **Valerie Concepcion (Click / GMA 7)**
- Amanda Griffin (F / ABS-CBN 2)
- Cindy Kurleto (Masayang Tanghali Bayan / ABS-CBN 2)
- Karel Marquez (Berks / ABS-CBN 2)
- Tuesday Vargas (Klasmeyts / ABS-CBN 2)

=== Best Gag Show ===
- **Bubble Gang (GMA 7)**
- Ispup (ABC 5)
- Klasmeyts (ABS-CBN 2)
- Wow Mali (ABC 5)

=== Best Comedy Show ===
- Bida si Mister, Bida si Misis (ABS-CBN 2)
- Daddy Di Do Du (GMA 7)
- Idol Ko Si Kap (GMA 7)
- Kool Ka Lang (GMA 7)
- **OK Fine, Whatever (ABS-CBN 2)**

=== Best Comedy Actor ===
- Ogie Alcasid (Bubble Gang / GMA 7)
- Joey de Leon (Beh Bote Nga / GMA 7)
- Edu Manzano (OK Fine, Whatever / ABS-CBN 2)
- **Vic Sotto (Daddy Di Do Du / GMA 7)**
- Michael V. (Bubble Gang / GMA 7)

=== Best Comedy Actress ===
- **Ai-Ai de las Alas (Whattamen / ABS-CBN 2)**
- Alma Moreno (Daboy en Da Girl / GMA 7)
- Rufa Mae Quinto (Bubble Gang / GMA 7)
- Maricel Soriano (Bida si Mister, Bida si Misis / ABS-CBN 2)
- Nova Villa (Home Along Da Riles/ ABS-CBN 2)

=== Best Musical Variety Show ===
- **ASAP Mania (ABS-CBN 2)**
- SOP (GMA 7)
- Master Showman Presents (GMA 7)

=== Best Musical Special ===
- A Joli-Na Christmas (GMA 7)
- Back 2 Back 2 Christmas (GMA 7)
- Dolphy: Diamond Life (ABS-CBN 2)
- **Isang Pamilya, Isang Puso Ngayong Pasko (ABS-CBN 2)**

=== Best Variety Show ===
- **Eat Bulaga (GMA-7)**
- Masayang Tanghali Bayan (ABS-CBN 2)

=== Best Female TV Host ===
- **Claudine Barretto (ASAP Mania / ABS-CBN 2)**
- Pops Fernandez (ASAP Mania / ABS-CBN 2)
- Jaya (SOP / GMA 7)
- Zsa Zsa Padilla (ASAP Mania / ABS-CBN 2)
- Regine Velasquez (SOP / GMA 7)

=== Best Male TV Host ===
- Ogie Alcasid (SOP / GMA 7)
- Joey de Leon (Eat Bulaga! / GMA 7)
- Randy Santiago (Masayang Tanghali Bayan / ABS-CBN 2)
- **Vic Sotto (Eat Bulaga! / GMA 7)**

=== Best Public Service Program ===
- Emergency (GMA 7)
- Imbestigador (GMA 7)
- Mission X (ABS-CBN 2)
- True Crime (ABS-CBN 2)
- Willingly Yours (ABS-CBN 2)
- **Wish Ko Lang (GMA 7)**

=== Best Public Service Program Host ===
- Arnold Clavio (Emergency / GMA 7)
- Mike Enriquez (Imbestigador / GMA 7)
- **Willie Revillame (Willingly Yours / ABS-CBN 2)**
- Bernadette Sembrano (Wish Ko Lang /GMA 7)
- Erwin Tulfo (Mission X / ABS-CBN 2)

=== Best Horror-Fantasy Program ===
- Kakabakaba (GMA 7)
- **Wansapanataym / (ABS-CBN 2)**

=== Best Game Show ===
- Digital LG Quiz (GMA 7)
- **Game KNB? (ABS-CBN 2)**
- K! The P1,000,000 Videoke Challenge (GMA 7)
- Sing Galing (TV5)

=== Best Game Show Host ===
- **Kris Aquino (Game KNB? / ABS-CBN 2)**
- Paolo Bediones and Regine Tolentino (Digital LG Quiz / GMA 7)
- Ai-Ai de las Alas and Allan K. (Sing Galing / TV5)
- Arnell Ignacio (K! The P1,000,000 Videoke Challenge / GMA 7)

=== Best Youth Oriented Program ===
- Berks (ABS-CBN 2)
- **Click (GMA 7)**
- Kahit Kailan (GMA 7)
- Tabing Ilog (ABS-CBN 2)

=== Best Educational Program ===
- Ating Alamin (IBC 13)
- Entrepinoy (IBC 13)
- Good Take (IBC 13)
- **Knowledge Power (ABS-CBN 2)**
- Kumikitang Kabuhayan (ABS-CBN 2)

=== Best Educational Program Host ===
- Zorah Andam (Good Take / IBC 13)
- **Ernie Baron (Knowledge Power / ABS-CBN 2)**
- Gerry Geronimo (Ating Alamin / IBC 13)
- January Isaac (Entrepinoy / IBC 13)
- Peter Musñgi (Kumikitang Kabuhayan / ABS-CBN 2)

=== Best Celebrity Talk Show ===
- Inday Heart to Heart (GMA 7)
- **Morning Girls with Kris and Korina (ABS-CBN 2)**
- Partners: Mel and Jay (GMA 7)
- Sharon (ABS-CBN 2)
- Sis (GMA 7)

=== Best Celebrity Talk Show Host ===
- **Kris Aquino and Korina Sanchez (Morning Girls with Kris and Korina / ABS-CBN 2)**
- Inday Badiday (Inday Heart to Heart / GMA 7)
- Sharon Cuneta (Sharon / ABS-CBN 2)
- Janice de Belen and Gelli de Belen (Sis / GMA 7)
- Jay Sonza and Mel Tiangco (Partners: Mel and Jay / GMA 7)

=== Best Magazine Show ===
- **The Correspondents (ABS-CBN 2)**
- E.T.C. (ABS-CBN 2)
- Jessica Soho Reports (GMA 7)
- Pipol (ABS-CBN 2)
- The Probe Team (GMA 7)

=== Best Magazine Show Host ===
- Paolo Bediones and Miriam Quiambao (Extra Extra / GMA 7)
- **Karen Davila and Company (The Correspondents / ABS-CBN 2)**
- Ces Drilon (Pipol / ABS-CBN 2)
- Cheche Lazaro (The Probe Team / GMA 7)
- Jessica Soho (Jessica Soho Reports / GMA 7)

=== Best News Program ===
- ABS-CBN Headlines (ABS-CBN 2)
- Arangkada Xtra Balita (RPN 9)
- Frontpage: Ulat ni Mel Tiangco (GMA 7)
- Saksi (GMA 7)
- Teledyaryo (NBN 4)
- **TV Patrol (ABS-CBN 2)**

=== Best Male Newscaster ===
- Martin Andanar (Teledyaryo / NBN 4)
- **Julius Babao (TV Patrol / ABS-CBN 2)**
- Cito Beltran (ABS-CBN Headlines / ABS-CBN 2)
- Mike Enriquez (Saksi / GMA 7)
- Henry Omaga-Diaz (TV Patrol / ABS-CBN 2)
- Erwin Tulfo (Magandang Umaga, Bayan / ABS-CBN 2)

=== Best Female Newscaster ===
- Karen Davila (ABS-CBN Headlines / ABS-CBN 2)
- **Korina Sanchez (TV Patrol / ABS-CBN 2)**
- Angelique Lazo (Arangkada Xtra Balita / RPN 9)
- Vicky Morales (Saksi / GMA 7)
- Bernadette Sembrano (Flash Report Special Edition / GMA 7)
- Mel Tiangco (Frontpage: Ulat ni Mel Tiangco / GMA 7)

=== Best Morning Show ===
- Magandang Morning Philippines (RPN 9)
- **Magandang Umaga, Bayan (ABS-CBN 2)**
- Unang Hirit (GMA 7)

=== Best Morning Show Host ===
- Bobby Andrews and Kaye Jimenez (Magandang Morning Philippines / RPN 9)
- **Julius Babao, Aljo Bendijo, Tin Tin Bersola, Cheryl Cosim, Ogie Diaz, Pia Guanio, Mon Ilagan, Edu Manzano, Cherie Mercado, Atty. Jesse Andres, Alex Santos, Connie Sison, Claudine Trillo, Erwin Tulfo, Bobby Yan and Company (Magandang Umaga, Bayan / ABS-CBN 2)**
- Love Añover, Lyn Ching-Pascual, Arnold Clavio, Suzie Entrata-Abrera, TJ Manotoc, Daniel Razon, Eagle Riggs, Lhar Santiago, Rhea Santos and Company (Unang Hirit, GMA 7)

=== Best Public Affairs Program ===
- Crossroads (ZOE TV 11)
- **Debate with Mare and Pare (GMA 7)**
- Diyos at Bayan (ZOE TV 11)
- Isyu (ABS-CBN 2)
- Off the Record (ABS-CBN 2)

=== Best Public Affairs Program Host ===
- Cito Beltran and Korina Sanchez (Isyu / ABS-CBN 2)
- Randy David and Katrina Legarda (Off The Record / ABS-CBN 2)
- **Winnie Monsod and Oscar Orbos (Debate / GMA 7)**
- Carlos Padilla (Crossroads / ZOE TV 11)
- Eddie Villanueva (Diyos at Bayan / ZOE TV 11)

=== Best Showbiz Oriented Talk Show ===
- **The Buzz (ABS-CBN 2)**
- S-Files (GMA 7)
- S2: Showbiz Sabado (ABS-CBN 2)
- Startalk (GMA 7)

=== Best Male Showbiz Oriented Talk Show Host ===
- **Boy Abunda (The Buzz / ABS-CBN 2)**
- Paolo Bediones (S-Files / GMA 7)
- Richard Gomez (S-Files, GMA 7)
- Edu Manzano (S2: Showbiz Sabado / ABS-CBN 2)
- Joey Marquez (S-Files, GMA 7)

=== Best Female Showbiz Oriented Talk Show Host ===
- Kris Aquino (The Buzz / ABS-CBN 2)
- Janice de Belen (S-Files / GMA 7)
- **Cristy Fermin (Showbiz Sabado / ABS-CBN 2)**
- Rosanna Roces (Startalk / GMA 7)

=== Best Children Show ===
- **Art is-Kool (GMA 7)**
- Chikiting Patrol (GMA 7)
- Epol/Apple (ABS-CBN 2)
- Math-Tinik (ABS-CBN 2)
- Sine'skwela (ABS-CBN 2)

=== Best Children Show Host ===
- **Robert Alejandro (Art is-Kool / GMA 7)**
- Chikiting Patrol Kids (Chikiting Patrol / GMA 7)
- Marick Dacanay, Nina de Sagun, Toots Javellana and Bodjie Pascua (Epol/Apol / ABS-CBN 2)
- Janus del Prado, Kristoffer Eursores and Hue Remulla (Math-Tinik / ABS-CBN 2)
- Sine'skwela Hosts (Sine'skwela / ABS-CBN 2)

=== Best Travel Show ===
- Biyaheng Langit (IBC 13)
- **Che Che Lazaro Presents (GMA 7)**
- Road Trip (RPN 9)
- Travel and Trade (IBC 13)

=== Best Travel Show Host ===
- Rey Langit and Reyster Langit (Biyaheng Langit / IBC 13)
- **Che Che Lazaro (Che Che Lazaro Presents / GMA 7)**
- Chiqui Roa-Puno (Travel and Trade / IBC 13)
- Eric Quizon and Jeffrey Quizon (Road Trip / RPN 9)

=== Best Lifestyle Show ===
- A Taste of Life (IBC 13)
- All About You (GMA 7)
- Better Home Ideas (RPN 9)
- **F (ABS-CBN 2)**
- Feel at Home with Charlene (ABS-CBN 2)

=== Best Lifestyle Show Host ===
- **Angel Aquino, Cher Calvin and Daphne Oseña-Paez (F / ABS-CBN 2)**
- Charlene Gonzales (Feel at Home with Charlene / ABS-CBN 2)
- Heny Sison (A Taste of Life / IBC 13)
- Regine Tolentino (Better Home Ideas / RPN 9)
- Lucy Torres (All About You / GMA 7)

== Special awards ==
=== Ading Fernando Lifetime Achievement Awardee ===
- Luz Valdez

=== Star Awards for Broadcasting Excellence ===
- Aljo Bendijo (Male)
- Kathy San Gabriel (Female)

=== Gems of the Night ===
- Bong Revilla (Male)
- Charlene Gonzales (Female)

=== Teens of the Night ===
- Richard Gutierrez (Male)
- Iza Calzado (Female)

=== Stars of the Night ===
- Edu Manzano (Male)
- Alma Moreno (Female)

== See also ==
- PMPC Star Awards for TV
