= 18th PMPC Star Awards for Television =

- Date: October 23, 2004
- Location: Aliw Theater, Pasay, Philippines
- Hosted by: Lorna Tolentino; Boy Abunda; Piolo Pascual

Television/radio coverage
- Network: RPN
- Produced by: Airtime Marketing Philippines, Inc.

The 18th PMPC Star Awards for Television took place at the Aliw Theater, Pasay, Philippines on October 23, 2004 and was broadcast on RPN Channel 9 on Saturday Night Playhouse. The awards night was hosted by Lorna Tolentino, Boy Abunda and Piolo Pascual.

== Nominees ==
These are the nominations for the 18th Star Awards for Television. The winners are in bold.

| Network | Total # of Nominees |
|---|---|
| ABS-CBN | 118 |
| NBN | 2 |
| ABC | 24 |
| GMA | 100 |
| RPN | 7 |
| IBC | 10 |
| Studio 23 | 5 |

| Network | Total # of Winners (including Special Awards) |
|---|---|
| ABS-CBN | 32 |
| ABC | 6 |
| GMA | 19 |
| RPN | 3 |

=== Best TV Station ===
- **ABS-CBN-2**
- NBN-4
- ABC-5
- GMA-7
- RPN-9
- IBC-13
- Studio 23

=== Best Primetime Drama Series ===
- Basta't Kasama Kita (ABS-CBN 2)
- It Might Be You (ABS-CBN 2)
- Kay Tagal Kang Hinintay (ABS-CBN 2)
- **Marina (ABS-CBN 2)**
- Sana'y Wala Nang Wakas (ABS-CBN 2)
- Te Amo, Maging Sino Ka Man (GMA 7)

=== Best Daytime Drama Series ===
- Daisy Siete (GMA 7)
- **Ikaw sa Puso Ko (GMA 7)**
- Mangarap Ka (ABS-CBN 2)
- Sarah the Teen Princess (ABS-CBN 2)
- Stage 1: The StarStruck Playhouse (GMA 7)
- Walang Hanggan (GMA 7)

=== Best Drama Actor ===
- John Lloyd Cruz (It Might Be You / ABS-CBN 2)
- Christopher de Leon (Hanggang Kailan / GMA 7)
- Eddie Garcia (Narito Ang Puso Ko / GMA 7)
- Richard Gomez (Ang Iibigin Ay Ikaw Pa Rin / GMA 7)
- **Diether Ocampo (Sana'y Wala Nang Wakas / ABS-CBN 2)**
- Piolo Pascual (Mangarap Ka / ABS-CBN 2)
- Jericho Rosales (Sana'y Wala Nang Wakas / ABS-CBN 2)

=== Best Drama Actress ===
- Bea Alonzo (It Might Be You / ABS-CBN 2)
- Claudine Barretto (Marina / ABS-CBN 2)
- Dina Bonnevie (Narito Ang Puso Ko / GMA 7)
- Malou de Guzman (Marina / ABS-CBN 2)
- Gloria Romero (Sana'y Wala Nang Wakas / ABS-CBN 2)
- Judy Ann Santos (Basta't Kasama Kita / ABS-CBN 2)
- **Lorna Tolentino (Hanggang Kailan / GMA 7)**

=== Best Drama Anthology ===
- **Maalaala Mo Kaya (ABS-CBN 2)**
- Magpakailanman (GMA 7)

=== Best Single Performance by an Actress ===
- Nora Aunor (Magpakailanman: Silang Mga Inihabilin ng Langit / GMA 7)
- Sunshine Dizon (Magpakailanman: Silang Mga Inihabilin ng Langit / GMA 7)
- Moreen Guese (Maalaala Mo Kaya: The Fatima Soriano Story / ABS-CBN 2)
- Maricel Laxa (Maalaala Mo Kaya: School Bus / ABS-CBN 2)
- **Ara Mina (Magpakailanman: Kapag Ang Pag-ibig ay Wagas / GMA 7)**
- Zsa Zsa Padilla (Maalaala Mo Kaya: Police Car / ABS-CBN 2)
- Eula Valdez (Maalaala Mo Kaya: Karinderya / ABS-CBN 2)

=== Best Single Performance by an Actor ===
- Goyong (Maalaala Mo Kaya: Police Car / ABS-CBN 2)
- Jhong Hilario (Maalaala Mo Kaya: Yellow Baby / ABS-CBN 2)
- Albert Martinez (Maalaala Mo Kaya: School Bus / ABS-CBN 2)
- Long Mejia (Maalaala Mo Kaya: Lugaw / ABS-CBN 2)
- **Roderick Paulate (Maalaala Mo Kaya: Bituin ABS-CBN 2)**
- Ronaldo Valdez (Maalaala Mo Kaya: Upuan / ABS-CBN 2)

=== Best New Male TV Personality ===
- Mark Bautista (Sarah, The Teen Princess / ABS-CBN 2)
- Joseph Bitangcol (Maalaala Mo Kaya: Barbecue / ABS-CBN 2)
- **Rainier Castillo (Click / GMA 7)**
- Gabb Drilon (Marina / ABS-CBN 2)
- Mark Herras (Click / GMA 7)
- Dion Ignacio (Stage 1: The StarStruck Playhouse: Luvsick @ Heart / GMA 7)
- Raphael Martinez (MTB: Ang Saya Saya! / ABS-CBN 2)
- **Erik Santos (ASAP Mania / ABS-CBN 2)**

=== Best New Female TV Personality ===
- **Bettina Carlos (Kakabakaba Adventures / GMA 7)**
- Rachelle Ann Go (ASAP Mania / ABS-CBN 2)
- Yasmien Kurdi (Click / GMA 7)
- Katherine Luna (It Might Be You / ABS-CBN 2)
- **Pauleen Luna (Marina / ABS-CBN 2)**
- Neri Naig (Maalaala Mo Kaya: Salamin / ABS-CBN 2)
- Cristine Reyes (Stage 1: The StarStruck Playhouse: My First Romance / GMA 7)
- Maja Salvador (It Might Be You / ABS-CBN 2)

=== Best Gag Show ===
- **Bubble Gang (GMA 7)**
- The Misadventures of Maverick and Ariel (ABC 5)
- Nuts Entertainment (GMA 7)
- Wazzup Wazzup (Studio 23)
- Wow Mali (ABC 5)
- Yes Yes Show (ABS-CBN 2)

=== Best Comedy Show ===
- Ang Tanging Ina (ABS-CBN 2)
- Bida si Mister, Bida si Misis (ABS-CBN 2)
- **Daddy Di Do Du (GMA 7)**
- Idol Ko Si Kap (GMA 7)
- Lagot Ka, Isusumbong Kita (GMA 7)
- **OK Fine, Whatever (ABS-CBN 2)**

=== Best Comedy Actor ===
- **Ogie Alcasid (Bubble Gang / GMA 7)**
- Joey de Leon (Nuts Entertainment / GMA 7)
- Edu Manzano (OK Fine, Whatever / ABS-CBN 2)
- Vhong Navarro (Bida si Mister, Bida si Misis / ABS-CBN 2)
- Vic Sotto (Daddy Di Do Du / GMA 7)
- Michael V. (Bubble Gang / GMA 7)

=== Best Comedy Actress ===
- **Ai-Ai delas Alas (Ang Tanging Ina / ABS-CBN 2)**
- Ethel Booba (All Together Now / GMA 7)
- Toni Gonzaga (Lagot Ka Isusumbong Kita / GMA 7)
- Rufa Mae Quinto (Bubble Gang / GMA 7)
- Maricel Soriano (Bida si Mister, Bida si Misis / ABS-CBN 2)
- Nova Villa (Home Along Da Airport/ABS-CBN 2)

=== Best Musical Variety Show ===
- **ASAP Mania (ABS-CBN 2)**
- SOP Rules (GMA-7)
- Master Showman Presents (GMA 7)

=== Best Variety Show ===
- **Eat Bulaga! (GMA 7)**
- Its Chowtime! (IBC 13)
- MTB: Ang Saya Saya! (ABS-CBN 2)

=== Best Female TV Host ===
- Ai Ai delas Alas (MTB: Ang Saya Saya! / ABS-CBN 2)
- Mickey Ferriols (MTB: Ang Saya Saya! / ABS-CBN 2)
- Toni Rose Gayda (Eat Bulaga! / GMA 7)
- Jaya (SOP Rules / GMA 7)
- **Zsa Zsa Padilla (ASAP Mania / ABS-CBN 2)**
- Regine Velasquez (SOP Rules / GMA 7)

=== Best Male TV Host ===
- Carlos Agassi (ASAP Mania / ABS-CBN 2)
- **Ogie Alcasid (SOP Rules / GMA 7)**
- Joey de Leon (Eat Bulaga! / GMA 7)
- Luis Manzano (ASAP Mania / ABS-CBN 2)
- Edu Manzano (MTB: Ang Saya Saya! / ABS-CBN 2)
- German Moreno (Master Showman Presents / GMA 7)
- Vic Sotto (Eat Bulaga! /GMA 7)
- Gary Valenciano (ASAP Mania / ABS-CBN 2)

=== Best Public Service Program ===
- Emergency (GMA 7)
- **Imbestigador (GMA 7)**
- Private-I (ABS-CBN 2)
- Simpleng Hiling (ABS-CBN 2)
- Wish Ko Lang (GMA 7)

=== Best Public Service Program Host ===
- Gus Abelgas (Private-I / ABS-CBN 2)
- Arnold Clavio (Emergency / GMA 7)
- Mike Enriquez (Imbestigador / GMA 7)
- **Vicky Morales (Wish Ko Lang / GMA 7)**
- Bernadette Sembrano (Lukso ng Dugo / ABS-CBN 2)
- Raffy Tulfo (Problema Mo, Sagot Ko / ABC 5)

=== Best Horror-Fantasy Program ===
- Kakabakaba Adventures (GMA 7)
- **Nginiig (ABS-CBN 2)**
- Wansapanataym (ABS-CBN 2)

=== Best Reality Competition Program ===
- **Extra Challenge (GMA 7)**
- Trip Kita (ABS-CBN 2)
- To The Max (ABS-CBN 2)
- Singles (ABC 5)

=== Best Reality Competition Program Host ===
- **Phoemela Barranda, Paolo Bediones and Ethel Booba (Extra Challenge / GMA 7)**
- Dominic Ochoa (Trip Kita / ABS-CBN 2)
- Marvin Agustin, Juddha Paolo and Rica Peralejo (To The Max / ABS-CBN 2)

=== Best Game Show ===
- Digital LG Quiz (GMA 7)
- **Next Level Na, Game KNB?** (ABS-CBN 2)
- K! The 1 Million Peso Videoke Challenge (GMA 7)
- Puso o Pera (ABC 5)
- Sing Galing (ABC 5)

=== Best Game Show Host ===
- **Ai Ai delas Alas and John Lapus (Sing Galing / ABC 5)**
- Kris Aquino (Next Level Na, Game KNB? / ABS-CBN 2)
- Paolo Bediones and Pia Guanio (Digital LG Quiz / GMA 7)
- Jaya and Allan K. (K! The 1 Million Peso Videoke Challenge / GMA 7)
- Willie Revillame (Puso o Pera / ABC 5)

=== Best Talent Search Program ===
- Search for a Star (GMA 7)
- **Star Circle Quest (ABS-CBN 2)**
- Star In A Million (ABS-CBN 2)
- **StarStruck (GMA 7)**
- StarStruck Kids (GMA 7)

=== Best Talent Search Program Host ===
- Ryan Agoncillo, Edu Manzano and Zsa Zsa Padilla (Star In A Million / ABS-CBN 2)
- Nancy Castiglione and Dingdong Dantes (StarStruck / GMA 7)
- **Jolina Magdangal (StarStruck Kids / GMA 7)**
- **Luis Manzano and Jodi Sta. Maria (Star Circle Quest / ABS-CBN 2)**
- Regine Velasquez (Search For A Star / GMA 7)

=== Best Youth Oriented Program ===
- Berks (ABS-CBN 2)
- **Click (GMA 7)**
- Love to Love (GMA 7)

=== Best Educational Program ===
- Ating Alamin (IBC 13)
- Kumikitang Kabuhayan (ABS-CBN 2)
- Lakas Magsasaka (GMA 7)
- **Ricky Reyes Beauty Plus (RPN 9)**

=== Best Educational Program Host ===
- Gerry Geronimo (Ating Alamin / IBC 13)
- Peter Musñgi (Kumi-Kitang Kabuhayan / ABS-CBN 2)
- **Ricky Reyes (Ricky Reyes Beauty Plus / RPN 9)**
- Albert Sumaya (Lakas Magsasaka / GMA 7)

=== Best Celebrity Talk Show ===
- Celebrity Turns (GMA 7)
- **Morning Girls with Kris and Korina (ABS-CBN 2)**
- Partners Mel and Jay (GMA 7)
- Sharon (ABS-CBN 2)
- Sis (GMA 7)

=== Best Celebrity Talk Show Host ===
- **Kris Aquino and Korina Sanchez (Morning Girls with Kris and Korina / ABS-CBN 2)**
- Sharon Cuneta (Sharon / ABS-CBN 2)
- Janice de Belen and Gelli de Belen (Sis / GMA 7)
- Lani Misalucha and Michael V. (Celebrity Turns / GMA 7)
- Jay Sonza and Mel Tiangco (Partners Mel and Jay / GMA 7)

=== Best Documentary Program ===
- i-Witness (GMA 7)
- The Correspondents (ABS-CBN 2)
- **The Probe Team Documentaries (ABC 5)**

=== Best Documentary Program Host ===
- Kara David, Vicky Morales, Maki Pulido, Howie Severino and Jay Taruc (i-Witness / GMA 7)
- Karen Davila and Abner Mercado (The Correspondents / ABS-CBN 2)
- **Che Che Lazaro (The Probe Team Documentaries / ABC 5)**

=== Best Documentary Special ===
- **50 Taong Ligawan: The Pinoy TV History (ABS-CBN 2)**
- Papogi: The Imaging of Philippine Presidents (ABS-CBN 2)
- Walang Bakas (GMA 7)

=== Best Magazine Show ===
- Jessica Soho Reports (GMA 7)
- **Kontrobersyal (ABS-CBN 2)**
- Magandang Gabi, Bayan (ABS-CBN 2)
- Pipol (ABS-CBN 2)
- Special Assignment (ABS-CBN 2)

=== Best Magazine Show Host ===
- **Boy Abunda (Kontrobersyal / ABS-CBN 2)**
- Katherine de Castro and Erwin Tulfo (Magandang Gabi Bayan / ABS-CBN 2)
- Ces Oreña-Drilon (Pipol / ABS-CBN 2)
- Jessica Soho (Jessica Soho Reports / GMA 7)
- Luchi Cruz-Valdez (Special Assignment / ABS-CBN 2)

=== Best News Program ===
- 24 Oras (GMA-7)
- ABS-CBN Insider (ABS-CBN 2)
- Big News (ABC 5)
- IBC Express Balita (IBC 13)
- News Central (Studio 23)
- RPN Arangkada Balita (RPN 9)
- Saksi (GMA 7)
- Teledyaryo (NBN 4)
- **TV Patrol (ABS-CBN 2)**

=== Best Male Newscaster ===
- **Martin Andanar (Big News / ABC 5)**
- **Julius Babao (TV Patrol / ABS-CBN 2)**
- Cito Beltran (ABS-CBN Insider / ABS-CBN 2)
- Arnold Clavio (Saksi / GMA 7)
- Mike Enriquez (24 Oras / GMA 7)
- Rolly "Lakay" Gonzalo (Teledyaryo / NBN 4)

=== Best Female Newscaster ===
- Karen Davila (Insider / ABS-CBN 2)
- Precious Hipolito (IBC Express Balita / IBC 13)
- Angelique Lazo (RPN Arangkada Balita / RPN 9)
- Vicky Morales (Saksi / GMA 7)
- **Korina Sanchez (TV Patrol / ABS-CBN 2)**
- Mel Tiangco (24 Oras / GMA 7)
- Amelyn Veloso (Big News / ABC 5)

=== Best Morning Show ===
- Breakfast (Studio 23)
- **Magandang Umaga, Bayan (ABS-CBN 2)**
- Unang Hirit (GMA 7)

=== Best Morning Show Host ===
- Ryan Agoncillo, Bam Aquino, Mariton Pacheco, Ria Tanjuatco-Trillo (Breakfast/Studio 23)
- **Julius Babao, Christine Bersola-Babao, Niña Corpuz, Bernadette Sembrano, Erwin Tulfo, Kim Atienza and Company (Magandang Umaga Bayan/ABS-CBN 2)**
- Lyn Ching, Arnold Clavio, Suzi Entrata, Daniel Razon, Rhea Santos and Company (Unang Hirit/GMA 7)

=== Best Public Affairs Program ===
- A Second Look (RPN 9)
- **Debate with Mare at Pare (GMA 7)**
- Direct Line (RPN 9)
- Dong Puno Live (ABS-CBN 2)

=== Best Public Affairs Program Host ===
- **Jeffrey Espiritu, Roger Evasco and Marigold Haber (Direct Line / RPN 9)**
- Winnie Monsod and Oscar Orbos (Debate with Mare at Pare / GMA 7)
- Anthony Pangilinan (A Second Look/RPN 9)
- Dong Puno (Dong Puno Live/ABS-CBN 2)

=== Best Showbiz Oriented Talk Show ===
- **The Buzz (ABS-CBN 2)**
- Celebrity DAT Com (IBC 13)
- S-Files (GMA 7)
- S2: Showbiz Sabado (ABS-CBN 2)
- Startalk (GMA 7)

=== Best Male Showbiz Oriented Talk Show Host ===
- **Boy Abunda (The Buzz / ABS-CBN 2)**
- Paolo Bediones (S-Files / GMA 7)
- Butch Francisco (Startalk / GMA 7)
- Richard Gomez (S-Files / GMA 7)
- Edu Manzano (S2: Showbiz Sabado / ABS-CBN 2)
- Joey Marquez (S-Files / GMA 7)

=== Best Female Showbiz Oriented Talk Show Host ===
- **Kris Aquino (The Buzz / ABS-CBN 2)**
- Janice de Belen (S-Files / GMA 7)
- Dolly Ann Carvajal (Celebrity DAT Com / IBC 13)
- Cristy Fermin (S2: Showbiz Sabado / ABS-CBN 2)
- Rosanna Roces (Startalk / GMA 7)
- Lolit Solis (Startalk / GMA 7)

=== Best Children Show ===
- Art Is Kool (GMA 7)
- **Chikiting Patrol (ABC 5)**
- Epol/Apple (ABS-CBN 2)
- Math-Tinik (ABS-CBN 2)
- Sineskwela (ABS-CBN 2)

=== Best Children Show Host ===
- Robert Alejandro (Art Is Kool / GMA 7)
- **Chikiting Patrol Kids (Chikiting Patrol / ABC 5)**
- Marick Dacanay, Nina de Sagun, Toots Javellana and Bodjie Pascua (Epol/Apple/ ABS-CBN 2)
- Janus del Prado, Kristoffer Eursores and Hue Remulla (Math-Tinik / ABS-CBN 2)
- Sineskwela Hosts (Sineskwela / ABS-CBN 2)

=== Best Lifestyle Show ===
- All About You (GMA 7)
- **At Home Ka Dito (ABS-CBN 2)**
- F! (ABS-CBN 2)
- Tahanang Pinoy (ABC 5)

=== Best Lifestyle Show Host ===
- **Angel Aquino, Amanda Griffin and Daphne Oseña-Paez (F! / ABS-CBN 2)**
- Mikee Cojuangco (All About You / GMA 7)
- **Charlene Gonzalez (At Home Ka Dito / ABS-CBN 2)**
- RJ Ledesma (Tahanang Pinoy / ABC 5)
- Lorna Tolentino (All About You / GMA 7)
- Dawn Zulueta (All About You / GMA 7)

=== Best Woman Show ===
- A Taste of Life (IBC 13)
- Gourmet Everyday (ABC 5)
- **Island Flavors (ABC 5)**
- Mommy Academy (IBC 13)
- Practical Cook (ABC 5)

=== Best Woman Show Host ===
- **Gigi Angkao and Ayet Evangelista (Island Flavors/ABC 5)**
- Desiree Ching (Gourmet Everyday/ABC 5)
- Nancy Reyes- Lumen (Practical Cook/ABC 5)
- Chiqui Roa-Puno (Mommy Academy/ABC 5)
- Heny Sison (A Taste of Life/IBC 13)

== Special awards ==
=== Star Award for Broadcasting Excellence ===
- Bong Lapira

=== Face of the Night ===
- Jodi Sta. Maria

=== Stars of the Night ===
- Piolo Pascual (Male)
- Kristine Hermosa (Female)

== See also ==
- PMPC Star Awards for TV
