= 15th PMPC Star Awards for Television =

- Date: October 6, 2001
- Location: UP Theater, Quezon City
- Presented by: Philippine Movie Press Club
- Hosted by: Pops Fernandez; Troy Montero; Dingdong Dantes; Ralion Alonzo; Kris Aquino

Television/radio coverage
- Network: RPN
- Produced by: Airtime Marketing Philippines, Inc.

The PMPC Star Awards for TV annually recognizes outstanding television programs in the Philippines. GMA won 49 awards, ABS-CBN won 16, RPN 9 won two and IBC 13 won only one.

The winner listed below.

== Winners ==
Best Children Show: 5 and Up (GMA 7)

Best Children Show Host: 5 and Up Kids (5 & Up/GMA 7)

Best Educational Program: Knowledge Power (ABS-CBN 2)

Best Educational Program Host: Ernie Baron (Knowledge Power/ABS-CBN 2)

Best Lifestyle Show: Beauty School Plus (RPN 9)

Best Lifestyle Show Host: Ricky Reyes (Beauty School Plus/RPN 9)

Best News Program: Frontpage: Ulat ni Mel Tiangco (GMA 7)

Best Female Newscaster: Mel Tiangco (Frontpage Ulat ni Mel Tiangco/GMA 7)

Best Male Newscaster: Henry Omaga Diaz (TV Patrol/ABS-CBN 2)

Best Magazine Show: The Probe Team (GMA 7)

Best Magazine Show Host: Che Che Lazaro and Co. (The Probe Team/GMA 7)

Best Morning Show: Unang Hirit (GMA 7)

Best Morning Show Host: Arnold Clavio, Lyn Ching, Miriam Quiambao, Suzie Entrata, Rhea Santos, Martin Andanar, Ivan Mayrina, Hans Montenegro and Co. (Unang Hirit/GMA 7)

Best Public Service Program: Imbestigador (GMA 7)

Best Public Service Program Host: Mike Enriquez (Imbestigador/GMA 7)

Best Public Affairs Program: Debate with Mare and Pare (GMA 7)

Best Public Affairs Program Host: Winnie Monsod and Oscar Orbos (Debate with Mare & Pare/GMA 7)

Best Documentary Show: I Witness (GMA 7)

Best Celebrity Talk Show: Partners Mel and Jay (GMA 7)

Best Celebrity Talk Show Host: Mel Tiangco and Jay Sonza (Partners Mel and Jay/GMA 7)

Best Showbiz-Oriented Show: The Buzz (ABS-CBN 2)

Best Female Showbiz-Oriented Show Host: Kris Aquino (The Buzz/ABS-CBN 2)

Best Male Showbiz-Oriented Show: Boy Abunda (The Buzz/ABS-CBN 2)

Best Youth-Oriented Program: Tabing Ilog (ABS-CBN 2)

Best Game Show: Digital LG Quiz (GMA 7)

Best Game Show Host: Paolo Bediones and Regine Tolentino (Digital LG Quiz/GMA 7)

Best New Female TV Personality: Yam Ledesma (Lunch Break/IBC 13) & Heart Evangelista (G-Mik/ABS-CBN 2)

Best New Male TV Personality: Aljo Bendijo (TV Patrol/ABS-CBN 2)

Best Gag Show: Bubble Gang (GMA 7)

Best Comedy Show: Idol Ko Si Kap (GMA 7)

Best Comedy Actress: Ai Ai delas Alas (1 For 3/GMA 7)

Best Comedy Actor: Ramon "Bong" Revilla, Jr. (Idol Ko Si Kap/GMA 7)

Best Horror/Fantasy: Wansapanataym (ABS-CBN 2)

Best Docu-Drama Program: Kasangga (GMA 7)

Best Drama Series: Pangako Sa 'Yo (ABS-CBN 2)

Best Drama Anthology: Maalaala Mo Kaya (ABS-CBN 2)

Best Drama Mini-Series: Pira-Pirasong Pangarap (GMA 7)

Best Drama Actress: Eula Valdez (Pangako Sa 'Yo/ABS-CBN 2)

Best Drama Actor: John Lloyd Cruz (Tabing Ilog/ABS-CBN 2)

Best TV/Musical Special: Pops A Summer Sail (ABS-CBN 2)

Best Variety Show: Eat Bulaga (GMA 7)

Best Musical Variety Show: S.O.P. (GMA 7)

Best Female TV Host: Pops Fernandez (A.S.A.P./ABS-CBN 2)

Best Male TV Host: Joey de Leon (Eat Bulaga/GMA 7)

Best Single Performance By An Actress: Mona Lisa (GMA Telesine: Pariwara/GMA 7) and Princess Ann Schuck (Pirapirasong Pangarap: Uling/GMA 7)

Best Single Performance By An Actor: Michael de Mesa (Parol: Maalaala Mo Kaya/ABS-CBN 2)

Best Movie For Television: Umaga, Tanghali, Gabi (GMA Telesine/GMA 7)

Best TV Station - GMA 7

== Special awards ==
Ading Fernando Memorial Award for Lifetime Achievement: Nora Aunor

Special Awards for Broadcasting Excellence: Cito Beltran

Female Star of the Night: Judy Ann Santos

Male Star of the Night: Dingdong Dantes

Skin Care Beauty: Melanie Marquez
