= Broadway Centrum =

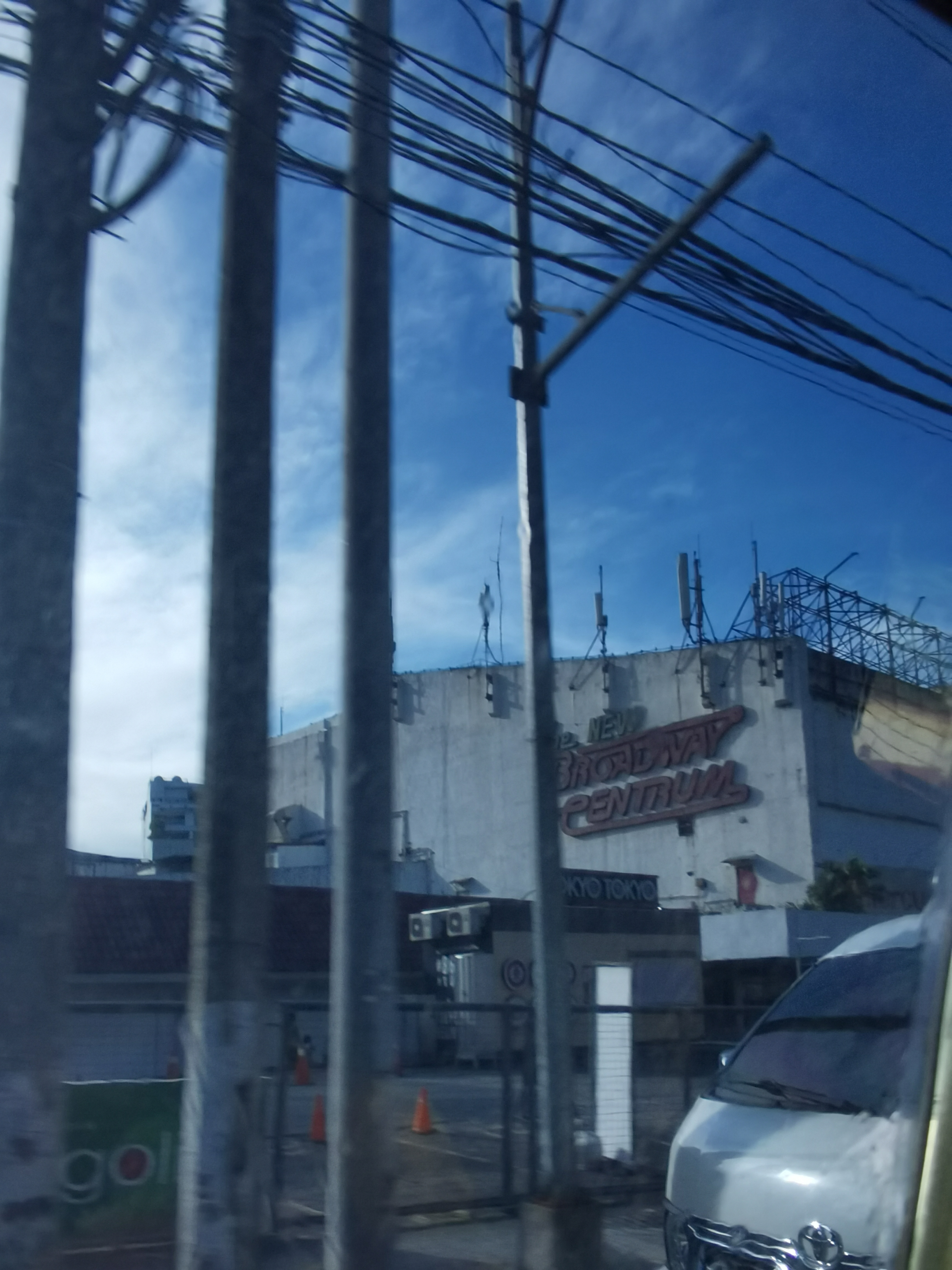
- Broadway Centrum in December 2022
- Alternative names: GMA Broadway Centrum (1987–2012); TV5 Broadway Centrum (2009–2013)

General information
- Type: Television studios
- Location: New Manila, Quezon City, Aurora Boulevard cor. Broadway Avenue, Quezon City
- Coordinates: 14.611813°N 121.032245°E
- Inaugurated: June 4, 1978
- Closed: December 7, 2018; 7 years ago (as a television studio) c. 1995 (as a shopping center)
- Owner: Broadway Centrum Condominium Corporation (1987–2012); Megaworld Corporation (2012–2018)

Broadway Centrum was a shopping center and television studio complex located in the New Manila district of Quezon City. It is currently owned by the Empire East Land Holdings, a subsidiary of Megaworld Corporation. It was previously owned by Broadway Centrum Condominium Corporation of the Orosa Family.

Originally a shopping center, numerous live and taped television series originated from the complex for over 40 years, including Walang Tulugan with the Master Showman and the longest-running noontime show Eat Bulaga!.

== History ==
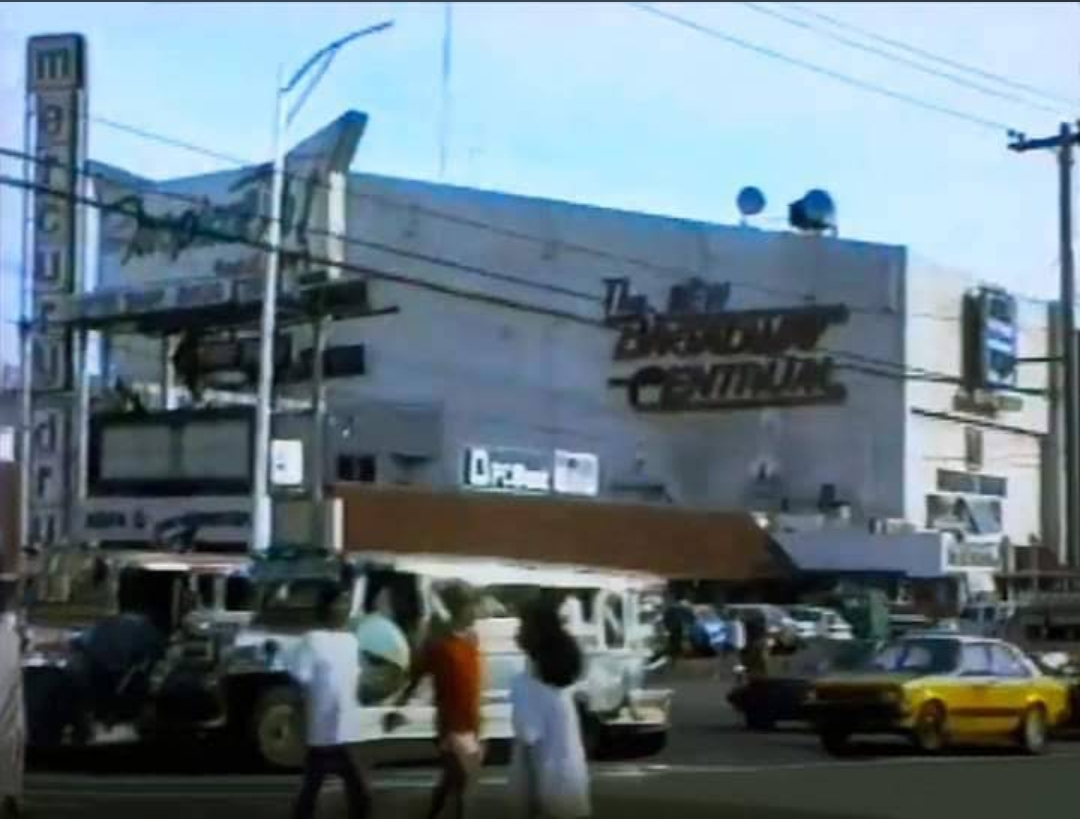
Broadway Centrum in 1980's

The complex was originally built in 1977 as a shopping center with 2 movie theaters: Westside and Eastside. But when GMA converted its audio system from mono to stereo broadcasting, the Westside theater was converted into a television studio, which opened in 1987. From there, it served as the live studio of variety shows Lunch Date, That's Entertainment, Vilma!, SOP and GMA Supershow. Then in 1995, GMA and TAPE Inc. bought the Eastside theater and converted that into another television studio in order to accommodate a permanent 400-person audience for Eat Bulaga!.

=== The Eat Bulaga! era (1995–2018) ===
The Eastside studio of the Broadway Centrum was the main home for the series from September 16, 1995. From January 1 to March 5, 2010, the show was temporarily broadcast from the Westside studio to the Eastside's renovation, After the return of Eat Bulaga! to its regular studio on March 6, 2010, Diz Iz It! was the last GMA show to originate from the west studio with the opening of GMA Network Studios. TV5 then leased the west studio facility from GMA. The Ryzza Mae Show was the last GMA program to use the east studio facility.

The Broadway Centrum was also popular for the run of Eat Bulaga's popular soap opera parody segment, Kalyeserye, which prominently featured the tandem of Alden Richards and Maine Mendoza known as AlDub.

=== TV5 and final years (2010–2018) ===
TV5 used the Westside studio for multiple shows, including Face to Face, The Jose and Wally Show Starring Vic Sotto, P.O.5, Star Factor, Lucky Numbers, Hey It's Saberdey! and Artista Academy.

In 2012, the Empire East Land Holdings, a subsidiary of Megaworld Corporation bought the Broadway Centrum to develop a residential condominium and a lifestyle mall at the site of the studio.

In March 2014, TV5 ended its lease agreement at the Broadway Centrum with the opening of the TV5 Media Center in Reliance, Mandaluyong.

=== Demise and fate ===
On December 7, 2018, the Broadway Centrum closed with the last broadcast of Eat Bulaga! from the Eastside studio, with the show moving to APT Studios, located in Cainta, Rizal the next day. The property remains unused in situ as Megaworld has yet to execute any of their development plans for the property.

== Shows produced at Broadway Centrum ==
Below is a partial list of programs that have taped episodes at the studios.

=== GMA/TV5 Westside Studio ===
- Artista Academy (TV5, 2012)
- Beh Bote Nga (GMA Network, 1999–2000)
- Bitoy's Bilibkaba (GMA Network, 1997–2000)
- Born to Be a Star (TV5, 2016)
- Bubble Gang (GMA Network, 1995–2000)
- D.A.T.S. (GMA Network, 1997–1999)
- Digital LG Quiz (GMA Network, 1999–2000)
- Diz Iz It! (GMA Network, 2010)
- Face to Face (TV5, 2010–2013)
- GMA Supershow (GMA Network, 1987–1997)
- GoBingo (GMA Network, 1996–1999)
- Good Morning Showbiz (GMA Network, 1987–1991)
- Guwapings Live! (GMA Network, 1992)
- HAPPinas Happy Hour (TV5, 2016)
- Happy Truck HAPPinas (TV5, 2016)
- Hey It's Saberdey! (TV5, 2011–2012)
- Jamming (GMA Network, 1999–2000)
- Katok Mga Misis (GMA Network, 1995–1997)
- Killer Karaoke: Pinoy Naman (TV5, 2013–2014)
- L.O.L: Laugh or Lose (TV5, 2010–2011)
- Lunch Date (GMA Network, 1987–1993)
- Martin After Dark (GMA Network, 1988–1993)
- Move It! (TV5, 2015)
- Mixed N.U.T.S.: Numerong Unong Terrific Show (GMA Network, 1994–1997)
- Oooops With Wendell & Antonio (GMA Network, 1999–2000)
- Partners Mel and Jay (GMA Network, 1996–2000)
- P.O.5 (TV5, 2010–2011)
- Rising Stars Philippines (TV5, 2015)
- S-Files (GMA Network, 1998–2007)
- SST: Salo-Salo Together (GMA Network, 1993–1995)
- Shades (GMA Network, 1987–1988)
- Show & Tell (GMA Network, 1994–1995)
- Showbiz Central (GMA Network, 2007–2012)
- SOP (GMA Network, 1997–2000)
- Star Factor (TV5, 2010)
- StarStruck (GMA Network, 2003–2007; 2009–2010)
- Startalk (GMA Network, 1995-1998)
- Sunday Funday (TV5, 2012)
- Talentadong Pinoy (TV5, 2008–2013, 2014)
- Tanghalan ng Kampeon (GMA Network, 1987–1994)
- That's Entertainment (GMA Network, 1987–1996)
- The 700 Club Asia (GMA Network, 1995–2000)
- The Jose and Wally Show Starring Vic Sotto (TV5, 2011–2012)
- Tok! Tok! Tok! Isang Milyon Pasok! (GMA Network, 2007–2008)
- Vilma! (GMA Network, 1987–1995)
- Walang Tulugan with the Master Showman (GMA Network, 1997–2001; 2004-2008)
- What Went Wrong? (GMA Network, 2000–2001)
- Who Wants to Be a Millionaire? (TV5, 2009–2015)

=== GMA-TAPE Eastside Studio ===
- Eat Bulaga! (GMA Network, 1995–2018)
- The Ryzza Mae Show (2013–2015)

== Films produced at Broadway Centrum ==
- Sige Ihataw Mo (1994)
- Bakit Papa? (2002)
- Jack Em Popoy (2018)
