= USI: Under Special Investigation =

- Genre: Documentary
- Created by: Associated Broadcasting Company
- Developed by: News5
- Directed by: Joey Talde
- Presented by: Paolo Bediones
- Country of origin: Philippines
- No. of episodes: 126

Production
- Executive producer: Ana V. Puod
- Producers: Journal Fabella; Janus Victoria; Rogelyn Perez; Generose Lyn Santiago
- Editors: Allan Celis; Rosselle Siojo
- Camera setup: Multiple-camera setup
- Running time: 45 minutes

Original release
- Network: TV5
- Release: March 14, 2010 – August 5, 2012

USI: Under Special Investigation is a Philippine television documentary show broadcast by TV5. Hosted by Paolo Bediones, it aired from March 14, 2010 to August 5, 2012.

== Host ==
- Paolo Bediones

== Background ==
The show is hosted by Paolo Bediones who came from GMA Network. On its months of airing, it features different presidential candidates during the elections of 2010. After the elections, the show focuses only on the different issues that made headlines.

== See also ==
- List of TV5 (Philippine TV network) original programming
- Sapul sa Singko
- Radyo5 92.3 News FM
