= Vilma (Philippine TV program) =

Philippine television variety show

- Title card
- Also known as: Vilma on Seven
- Genre: Variety show
- Directed by: Romy Veron
- Presented by: Vilma Santos
- Country of origin: Philippines
- Original language: Tagalog
- No. of episodes: 479

Production
- Executive producer: Chit Guerrero
- Production locations: Manila Metropolitan Theater, Manila, Philippines (1986–87); GMA Broadway Centrum, Quezon City, Philippines (1987–95)
- Camera setup: Multiple-camera setup
- Running time: 90–120 minutes
- Production company: GMA Entertainment TV

Original release
- Network: GMA Network
- Release: August 8, 1986 – September 29, 1995

Vilma is a Philippine television variety show broadcast by GMA Network. Hosted by Vilma Santos, it premiered on August 8, 1986 on the network's Friday evening line up. The show concluded on September 29, 1995, with a total of 479 episodes.

== Overview ==
Formerly known as Vilma In Person, Vilma! (also known as Vilma! on Seven) premiered on August 8, 1986. The pilot episode was filmed from the Metropolitan Theater where Vilma Santos and the VIP Dancers regularly performed there until 1987 when the show moved to GMA Broadway Studios. The show received four nominations in the PMPC Star Awards for TV from 1988 to 1990, 1992 and 1994, as well as Best Female Musical Variety Show Host from 1987 to 1988. There were also anniversary and birthday specials from 1987 to 1994.

== Cast ==
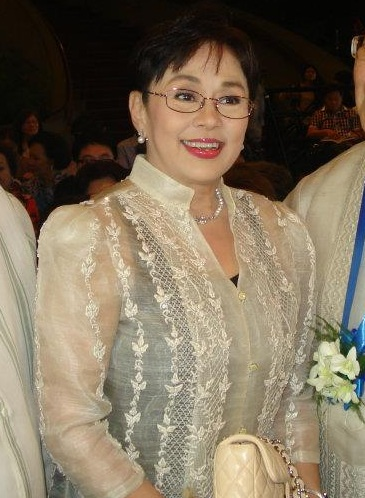
Vilma Santos serves as a host.

Host

- Vilma Santos

Dancers

- V.I.P. Dancers

== Ratings ==
Vilma is one of the highest-rated television shows in Philippine history, reaching 47% national ratings nationwide.

== Accolades ==
Accolades received by Vilma
Year	Award	Category	Recipient	Result	Ref.
1987	1st PMPC Star Awards for Television	Best Female Musical Variety Show Host	Vilma Santos	Won	
1988	2nd PMPC Star Awards for Television	Best Musical Variety Show	Vilma	Won	
1988	2nd PMPC Star Awards for Television	Best Female Musical Variety Show Host	Vilma Santos	Won	
1989	3rd PMPC Star Awards for Television	Best Musical Variety Show	Vilma	Won	
1990	4th PMPC Star Awards for Television	Best Musical Variety Show	Vilma	Won	
1992	6th PMPC Star Awards for Television	Best Musical Variety Show	Vilma	Won	
1994	8th PMPC Star Awards for Television	Best Musical Variety Show	Vilma	Won	
