= Cher Calvin =

American journalist

- Born: Cherlynn Calvin; August 1, 1974 (age 51); New York City, New York, U.S
- Education: New York University
- Occupation: News presenter
- Employer(s): GMA Network (1998–1999, Philippines); ABS-CBN (1999–2003, Philippines); KVVU-TV (2003–2004); KTLA (2005–present)
- Awards: 11 Emmy Awards and 6 Golden Mike Awards

Cher Calvin (born August 1, 1974) is the lead news anchor for KTLA, the flagship station for The CW and Nexstar in Los Angeles.

== Biography ==
Born Cherlynn Calvin on August 1, 1974, in New York City, she is the daughter of the former Filipino actor Roger Calvin. She graduated from the Marymount School of New York in 1992, a college preparatory Catholic high school for girls on the Upper East Side of Manhattan. She is a New York University graduate with a BA in broadcast journalism and a minor in political science.

== Career ==
Calvin's career started in The Philippines for the GMA Network, where she hosted Mornings @ GMA from 1998 to 1999, before becoming a co-host on the ABS-CBN daytime lifestyle show F! from that year until 2003. She would move back to the U.S. and take a position at KVVU-TV, the Fox affiliate in Las Vegas as a morning news anchor, by coincidence replacing longtime Los Angeles anchor Sharon Tay. She moved west to KTLA in January 2005 as an anchor and reporter. While reporting for KTLA she has won 9 Los Angeles Emmy Awards for news journalism, winning 5 consecutive years (2012–2017), and has received 5 Golden Mike Awards.

Being in Los Angeles, Calvin has appeared in several scripted television shows as a reporter or anchor, including Chuck, Criminal Minds and The Closer, along with an appearance in the 2008 film Hancock.

== Personal life ==
Calvin is Filipino American, speaking fluent Tagalog in addition to English, and participates in many community service events within Southern California's Filipino and Asian American communities on behalf of herself and KTLA. She once was featured as a player in a production of The Vagina Monologues at the Center for the Pacific Asian Family to benefit victims of domestic abuse both home and abroad.
