= Wansapanataym =

Philippine fantasy anthology television series

- Title card for the revival series from 2010 to 2019
- Also known as: Wansapanataym Presents
- Genre: Fantasy; Comedy; Drama; Anthology; Children's television series; Educational
- Created by: ABS-CBN Corporation; ABS-CBN Studios
- Written by: Various
- Directed by: Various
- Starring: Various
- Theme music composer: Homer Flores (1997–2004); Jonathan Manalo (2004–2005; 2010–2019)
- Opening theme: "Nantucket" by Andrew White and David Arkenstone (1997–2001) "Wansapanataym" by Nyoy Volante (2004–2005, 2010–2011)
- Ending theme: "Wansapanataym" by Michelle Ayalde (1997–2004, also used as opening theme from 1997–2001 in some episodes) "Wansapanataym" by Nyoy Volante (2004–2005, 2010–2019)
- Country of origin: Philippines
- Original language: Filipino
- No. of seasons: 10 (3 [original series], 7 [revival series])
- No. of episodes: 792 (351 [original series], 441 [revival series]) (list of episodes)

Production
- Executive producers: Carlo Katigbak; Cory Vidanes; Laurenti Dyogi; Roldeo Endrinal; Julie Anne Benitez
- Producer: Brenda Lee Estocapio
- Running time: 42–90 minutes (original series); 21–50 minutes (revival series)
- Production companies: Dreamscape Entertainment; CineMedia Group (2010–2019)

Original release
- Network: ABS-CBN
- Release: June 22, 1997 – February 27, 2005
- Release: September 11, 2010 – April 7, 2019

Related
- Hiraya Manawari; Komiks

Wansapanataym (Filipinization of the English phrase "once upon a time"), also known as Wansapanataym Presents, is a Philippine television drama fantasy anthology series broadcast by ABS-CBN. It aired from June 22, 1997 to February 27, 2005, replacing The Sharon Cuneta Show. The show returned on the network's Yes Weekend! line up and worldwide on TFC from September 11, 2010 to April 7, 2019, replacing Agimat: Ang Mga Alamat ni Ramon Revilla and was replaced by Hiwaga ng Kambat. The series was also aired on ABS-CBN's Yes Weekend! primetime block with new episodes and remakes of past episodes. However, because of the COVID-19 pandemic in the Philippines, Wansapanataym returned on air every weekend from March 29 to May 3, 2020, replacing 24/7 and Home Sweetie Home and was replaced by Paano Kita Mapasasalamatan? and Iba 'Yan on Kapamilya Channel's weekend evening slot.

The series features stories of ordinary people who experience magical and supernatural events that change their lives. Similar to the children's programme Hiraya Manawari, the series also aims to provide values education for young viewers. (Note: The show highlights moral values such as courage, discipline, honesty, humility, love, obedience, and respect.)

Wansapanataym is one of the longest-running fantasy anthology series on Philippine television, marking its nineteenth year in 2019. Described by its creators as "the original storybook of Filipino children", the programme incorporated other genres while retaining its fantasy focus. In its later seasons, it placed greater focus on romance featuring love teams.

== History ==
Wansapanataym was launched in 1997, having genre similarities with the ABS-CBN Foundation-produced educational program Hiraya Manawari (which features Filipino short stories for children) and the 1980s series Pinoy Fantasy. A film was also produced based on the show's genre, which starred Serena Dalrymple, Christopher de Leon and Shaina Magdayao.

Judy Ann Santos and the late Rico Yan graced the very first episode of Wansapanataym.

From September 5, 2004 to February 27, 2005, the show underwent a reformat featuring two child characters (played by Sharlene San Pedro and Nash Aguas) and a magical book inside a chest or somewhere in their house at the start and end of almost every episode. The original series ended on February 27, 2005, after almost eight years of airing.

Re-runs of past episodes (2002–2005; 2010–2019) are currently streaming on the Yey! YouTube Channel every Tuesday at 10:00 am and 3:00 pm, Saturdays at 7:30 am and Sundays at 9:00 am on Kapamilya Channel, Saturdays at 9:00 am and Sundays at 9:30 am on A2Z and Weekends at 4:30 pm on Jeepney TV.

=== 1999 film ===
Wansapanataym
- Theatrical release poster
- Directed by: Johnny Manahan
- Written by: Shaira Mella Salvador
- Based on: Wansapanataym: "Kapirasong Langit" episode by Chito S. Roño
- Produced by: Charo Santos-Concio; Malou N. Santos
- Starring: Serena Dalrymple; Christopher de Leon; Shaina Magdayao; Angel Aquino
- Cinematography: Eduard Achacoso; Ricardo Jose Trofeo
- Edited by: Marya Ignacio
- Music by: Jaime Fabregas
- Production company: Star Cinema
- Release date: May 26, 1999
- Running time: 94 minutes
- Country: Philippines
- Language: Filipino

Wansapanataym (also known as Wansapanataym: The Movie) is a 1999 Filipino fantasy comedy-drama film directed by Johnny Manahan, and was released in May 26, 1999. A film adaptation, it is a remake of the episode "Kapirasong Langit" directed by Chito S. Roño. The story follows Anna (Shaina Magdayao), an orphaned girl who sets out in search of her long-lost father (Christopher de Leon), aided by a guardian angel named Barbiel (Serena Dalrymple).

==== Cast and characters ====
- Serena Dalrymple as Barbiel
- Christopher de Leon as Gary Asuring
- Shaina Magdayao as Anna
- Angel Aquino as Sylvia Enrique
- Rosemarie Gil as Doña Tisay Enrique
- Romeo Rivera as Don Victor Enrique
- Jericho Rosales as Michael
- Gloria Sevilla as Manang Bising

=== 2010 revival ===
During the ABS-CBN Trade Launch held at NBC Tent, Metro Manila in August 2010, it was announced that Wansapanataym would return with new episodes. Unlike the previous iteration, it focuses on adaptations based on "komiks" in the first season. It premiered on September 11, 2010, with its first episode "Inday Bote" starring Melai Cantiveros-Francisco. The succeeding seasons stayed faithful to the original format. The show's second iteration initially aired on Saturday nights, but on May 25, 2014, Wansapanataym returned to Sunday nights again and onwards, similar to the first 1997–2005 iteration, but continued airing on Saturday nights until October 25, 2014 via its overall Saturday night timeslot, with a replay of "OMG! Oh My Ghost" on November 1, 2014.

On June 29, 2013, Wansapanataym was reformatted as a bi-monthly series wherein one story will be shown for a month or two except on Christmas specials.

On November 8, 2015, Wansapanataym launched its two-month television special titled 15 Magical Years in celebration of the show's 15th anniversary, airing 8 special episodes (4 of which were Christmas specials). The special ended on December 27, 2015, now regularly airing bi-monthly episodes.

After almost 9 years of broadcast airing of the show, Wansapanataym ended its overall original run on April 7, 2019, with a replay of "Selfie Pa More, Sasha No More" on April 14, 2019 between the show's second and final iteration original airing and its replacement Hiwaga ng Kambat.

=== WansapanaSummer ===
WansapanaSummer is a re-run of the past episodes from the show's second iteration. It was aired every weekday mornings on the network's Umaganda morning block from 2013 to 2014 (its 2015 airing was just a replay of one monthly special).

The first run of WansapanaSummer aired from April 29 to June 20, 2013, every Mondays to Fridays at 10:15 am, replacing Ohlala Couple. The highest rating was 18.3% on May 10, 2013.

The second run of WansapanaSummer aired from March 17 to April 11, 2014, every Mondays to Fridays at 10:15 am, replacing Crazy Love and was replaced by Kapamilya Kiddie Blockbusters.

The third run of WansapanataymSummer presents "My App #Boyfie" aired from April 13 to 24, 2015, every Mondays to Fridays at 9:20 am, replacing Haikyu!! and was replaced by Kapamilya Blockbusters.

=== Wansapanataym Classics ===
Wansapanataym Classics (also known as Wansapanataym Klasiks) is a re-run of past episodes from the first 1997–2005 iteration.

It airs every Saturday at 8:00 pm to 9:00 pm on the Jeepney TV channel, (Note: Also streaming on the Jeepney TV YouTube Channel, up until December 4, 2022.) and weekends at 4:00 pm to 9:00 pm on the Yey! channel. (Note: Also streaming on the Yey! YouTube Channel. Note that it only re-runs episodes from 2002 to 2005.)

== Theme song ==
The first theme song was sung by Michelle Ayalde in the television series and Roselle Nava in the film. It was composed by Homer Flores in the television series and Jaime Fabregas in the film, with lyrics by Jose Bartolome. The song was used from 1997 until 2004.

The second theme song was sung by Nyoy Volante, replacing Ayalde's version. It was composed by Jonathan Manalo replacing Flores, with lyrics by Aris Pollisco (Gloc-9), replacing Bartolome. It was used in 2004–2005 and in 2010–2019.

== Awards and recognitions ==
=== Original series ===
Year	Awards	Nominated	Result
2000	14th PMPC Star Awards for Television by Philippine Movie Press Club	Wansapanataym as Best Horror-Fantasy Program	Nominated
2001	15th PMPC Star Awards for Television by Philippine Movie Press Club	Wansapanataym as Best Horror-Fantasy Program	Won
2002	16th PMPC Star Awards for Television by Philippine Movie Press Club	Wansapanataym as Best Horror-Fantasy Program	Won
2003	17th PMPC Star Awards for Television by Philippine Movie Press Club	Wansapanataym as Best Horror-Fantasy Program	Won
2004	18th PMPC Star Awards for Television by Philippine Movie Press Club	Wansapanataym as Best Horror-Fantasy Program	Nominated
2004	26th Catholic Mass Media Awards by Archdiocese of Manila	Wansapanataym for the Hall of Fame 2004	Won
2005	19th PMPC Star Awards for Television by Philippine Movie Press Club	Wansapanataym as Best Horror-Fantasy Program	Nominated

=== Revival series ===
Year	Awards	Nominated	Result	Ref.
2019	Aral Parangal 2019 Awards by Young Educators' Convergence of SOCCSKSARGEN	Wansapanataym as Best Values-Oriented Show	Won	
2018	Sinebata 2018 Awards by AnakTV	"Jasmin's Flower Powers" episodes for the Professional Fiction for 13-17 Age category	Won	
2018	4th ALTA Media Icon Awards by ALTA Media Icon Awards	Wansapanataym as Best Youth-Oriented Program	Won	
2017	2017 International Emmy Kids Awards by International Academy of Television Arts and Sciences	"Candy's Crush" episodes as Best TV Movie/Mini-Series	Nominated	
2017	2017 Anak TV Awards by AnakTV	Wansapanataym for the Anak TV Seal	Won	
2017	31st PMPC Star Awards for Television by Philippine Movie Press Club	Wansapanataym as Best Horror/Fantasy Program	Won	
2017	31st PMPC Star Awards for Television by Philippine Movie Press Club	AC Bonifacio ("Amazing Ving" episodes) for Best New Female TV Personality	Nominated	
2017	31st PMPC Star Awards for Television by Philippine Movie Press Club	Kisses Delavin ("Amazing Ving" episodes) for Best New Female TV Personality	Nominated	
2017	31st PMPC Star Awards for Television by Philippine Movie Press Club	Marco Gallo ("Amazing Ving" episodes) for Best New Male TV Personality	Nominated	
2017	31st PMPC Star Awards for Television by Philippine Movie Press Club	Awra Briguela ("Amazing Ving" episodes) for Best Child Performer	Nominated	
2015	29th PMPC Star Awards for Television by Philippine Movie Press Club	Wansapanataym as Best Drama Mini-Series	Nominated	
2015	29th PMPC Star Awards for Television by Philippine Movie Press Club	Harvey Bautista ("Remote ni Eric" episodes) as Best Child Performer	Nominated	
2015	29th PMPC Star Awards for Television by Philippine Movie Press Club	Kurt Ong ("My Kung Fu Chinito" episodes) as Best New Male TV Personality	Nominated	
2015	2015 Anak TV Awards by AnakTV	Wansapanataym for the Anak TV Seal	Won	
2014	28th PMPC Star Awards for Television by Philippine Movie Press Club	Marco Pingol ("My App #Boyfie" episodes) as Best New Male TV Personality	Nominated	
2014	28th PMPC Star Awards for Television by Philippine Movie Press Club	Inah Estrada ("Witch-A-Makulit" episodes) as Best New Female TV Personality	Nominated	
2014	Gandingan 2014: UPLB's 8th Isko't Iska Broadcast Choice Awards by UP Community Broadcasters' Society	Wansapanataym as Best Development-Oriented Children's Program	Won	
2014	12th Gawad Tanglaw by Gawad Tanglaw	Wansapanataym as Best Educational Program	Won	
2014	2014 Anak TV Awards by AnakTV	Wansapanataym for the Anak TV Seal	Won	
2013	27th PMPC Star Awards for Television by Philippine Movie Press Club	Wansapanataym as Best Horror/Fantasy Program	Won	
2013	2013 Ani ng Dangal Award by the National Commission on Culture and the Arts	"Chalk Boy" episodes for the Multi-Disciplinary Arts Category	Won	
2013	21st Golden Dove Awards by Kapisanan ng mga Brodkaster ng Pilipinas	Wansapanataym as Best Children’s Program	Won	
2013	2013 Anak TV Awards by AnakTV	Wansapanataym for the Anak TV Seal	Won	
2012	2012 Prix Jeunesse International Festival by Prix Jeunesse Foundation	"Chalk Boy" episodes for the Children’s Jury Prize	Won	
2012	26th PMPC Star Awards for Television by Philippine Movie Press Club	Slater Young as Best New Male TV Personality	Nominated	
2012	26th PMPC Star Awards for Television by Philippine Movie Press Club	Wansapanataym as Best Horror/Fantasy Program	Won	
2012	34th Catholic Mass Media Awards by Archdiocese of Manila	Wansapanataym as Best Children and Youth Program	Won	
2011	2011 Anak TV Awards by AnakTV	Wansapanataym for the Anak TV Seal	Won	

== See also ==
- List of programs broadcast by ABS-CBN
- Buhawi Jack
