= Emergency (Philippine TV program) =

Philippine television documentary show

- Title card
- Genre: Documentary
- Presented by: Edu Manzano; Arnold Clavio
- Country of origin: Philippines
- Original languages: English (1995–96); Tagalog (1996–2009)
- No. of episodes: 635

Production
- Camera setup: Multiple-camera setup
- Running time: 42 minutes
- Production company: GMA News and Public Affairs

Original release
- Network: GMA Network
- Release: October 4, 1995 – March 6, 2009

Emergency is a Philippine television documentary show broadcast by GMA Network. Originally hosted by Edu Manzano, it premiered on October 4, 1995. Arnold Clavio served as the host from 1996 to 2009. The show concluded on March 6, 2009, with a total of 635 episodes.

== Premise ==
The show features reports on natural calamities, man-made disasters, diseases, advancements in the medical field, successful operations of men in uniform, rescue operations of emergency response teams, safety tips, stories on heroic deeds of ordinary people and institutions and numerous other life-threatening situations. It also featured anniversary specials and reports regarding major issues, such as child labor.

== Hosts ==
- Edu Manzano (1995–96)
- Arnold Clavio (1996–2009)

== Accolades ==
Accolades received by Emergency
Year	Award	Category	Recipient	Result	Ref.
1997	New York Festivals		"Isang Gabing Impiyerno, the Ozone Disco Tragedy"	Finalist	
1998	Philippine AIDS-STD Media Awards	Best TV Reportage	"Salot ng Siglo"	Won	
2003	17th PMPC Star Awards for Television	Best Public Service Program	Emergency	Won	
2003	17th PMPC Star Awards for Television	Best Public Service Program Host	Arnold Clavio	Nominated	
2004	18th PMPC Star Awards for Television	Best Public Service Program Host	Arnold Clavio	Nominated	
2006	20th PMPC Star Awards for Television	Best Public Service Program	Emergency	Nominated	
2006	20th PMPC Star Awards for Television	Best Public Service Program Host	Arnold Clavio	Nominated	
2007	21st PMPC Star Awards for Television	Best Public Service Program	Emergency	Nominated	
2007	21st PMPC Star Awards for Television	Best Public Service Program Host	Arnold Clavio	Nominated	
2008	22nd PMPC Star Awards for Television	Best Public Service Program	Emergency	Nominated	
