= Showbiz Central =

Philippine television talk show

- Title card from November 2011 to July 2012
- Genre: Talk show
- Presented by: Raymond Gutierrez; Pia Guanio; John Lapus; Jennylyn Mercado
- Country of origin: Philippines
- Original language: Tagalog
- No. of episodes: 275

Production
- Production locations: GMA Broadway Centrum (2007–08); GMA Studio 2 (2008–10); GMA Studio 6 (2010–12)
- Camera setup: Multiple-camera setup
- Running time: 120 minutes
- Production company: GMA Entertainment TV

Original release
- Network: GMA Network
- Release: April 29, 2007 – July 29, 2012

Showbiz Central is a Philippine television talk show broadcast by GMA Network. Originally hosted by Raymond Gutierrez, Pia Guanio and John Lapus, it premiered on April 29, 2007. The show concluded on July 29, 2012, with a total of 275 episodes. Gutierrez, Guanio, Lapus and Jennylyn Mercado served as the final hosts.

The show is streaming online on YouTube.

== Hosts ==
Hosts

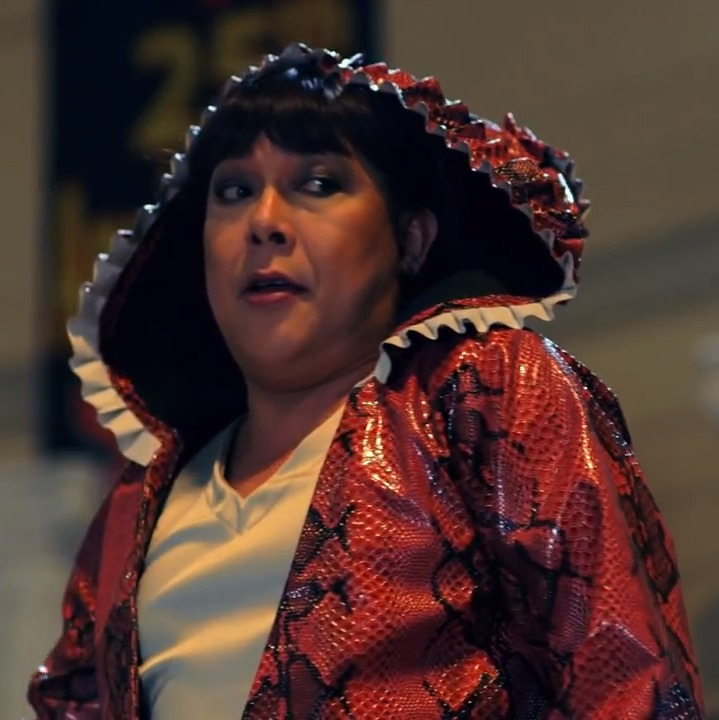
John Lapus

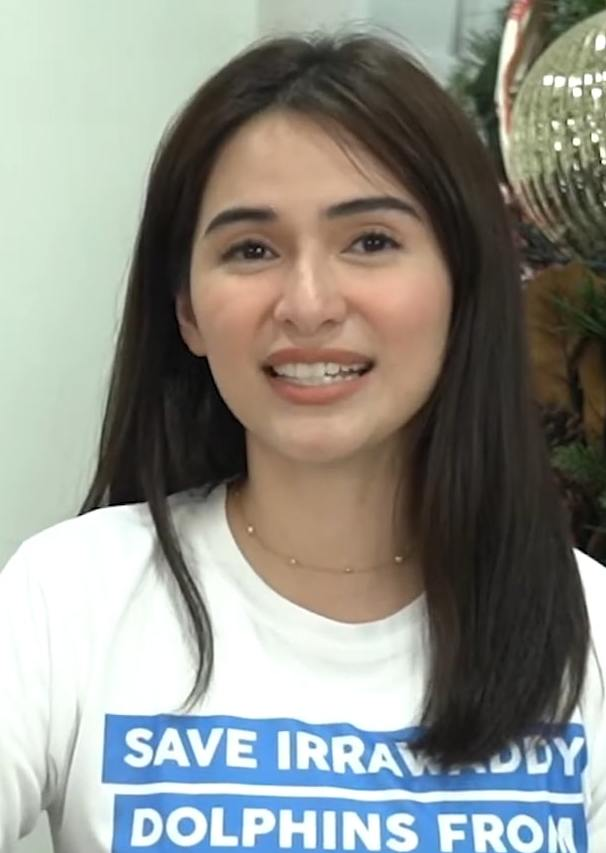
Jennylyn Mercado

- Raymond Gutierrez (2007–12)
- Pia Guanio (2007–12)
- John Lapus (2007–12)
- Mo Twister (2008–10)
- Rufa Mae Quinto (2008–11)
- Jennylyn Mercado (2011–12)

Recurring host

- Jolina Magdangal (2009–10)

== Ratings ==
According to AGB Nielsen Philippines' Mega Manila household television ratings, the final episode of Showbiz Central scored a 9.5% rating.

== Accolades ==
Accolades received by Showbiz Central
Year	Award	Category	Recipient	Result	Ref.
2008	22nd PMPC Star Awards for Television	Best Showbiz Oriented/Celebrity Talk Show	Showbiz Central	Nominated	
2008	22nd PMPC Star Awards for Television	Best Female Showbiz Oriented/Celebrity Talk Show Host	Pia Guanio	Nominated	
2008	22nd PMPC Star Awards for Television	Best Female Showbiz Oriented/Celebrity Talk Show Host	Rufa Mae Quinto	Nominated	
2008	22nd PMPC Star Awards for Television	Best Male Showbiz Oriented/Celebrity Talk Show Host	Raymond Gutierrez	Nominated	
2009	23rd PMPC Star Awards for Television	Best Showbiz Oriented/Celebrity Talk Show	Showbiz Central	Nominated	
2009	23rd PMPC Star Awards for Television	Best Female Showbiz Oriented/Celebrity Talk Show Host	Pia Guanio	Nominated	
2009	23rd PMPC Star Awards for Television	Best Male Showbiz Oriented/Celebrity Talk Show Host	Raymond Gutierrez	Nominated	
2009	23rd PMPC Star Awards for Television	Best Male Showbiz Oriented/Celebrity Talk Show Host	Mo Twister	Nominated	
2010	24th PMPC Star Awards for Television	Best Showbiz Oriented/Celebrity Talk Show	Showbiz Central	Nominated	
2010	24th PMPC Star Awards for Television	Best Female Showbiz Oriented/Celebrity Talk Show Host	Pia Guanio	Nominated	
2010	24th PMPC Star Awards for Television	Best Male Showbiz Oriented/Celebrity Talk Show Host	Raymond Gutierrez	Nominated	
2011	8th Golden Screen TV Awards	Outstanding Showbiz Talk Program	Showbiz Central	Nominated	
2011	8th Golden Screen TV Awards	Outstanding Showbiz Talk Program Host	John Lapus Pia Guanio Raymond Gutierrez	Nominated	
2011	25th PMPC Star Awards for Television	Best Showbiz Oriented/Celebrity Talk Show	Showbiz Central	Nominated	
2011	25th PMPC Star Awards for Television	Best Female Showbiz Oriented/Celebrity Talk Show Host	Pia Guanio	Nominated	
2011	25th PMPC Star Awards for Television	Best Male Showbiz Oriented/Celebrity Talk Show Host	Raymond Gutierrez	Nominated	
2012	26th PMPC Star Awards for Television	Best Showbiz Oriented/Celebrity Talk Show	Showbiz Central	Nominated	
2012	26th PMPC Star Awards for Television	Best Male Showbiz Oriented/Celebrity Talk Show Host	Raymond Gutierrez	Nominated	
2013	10th Golden Screen TV Awards	Outstanding Showbiz Talk Program	Showbiz Central	Nominated	
2013	10th Golden Screen TV Awards	Outstanding Male Showbiz Talk Program Host	John Lapus Raymond Gutierrez	Nominated	
2013	10th Golden Screen TV Awards	Outstanding Female Showbiz Talk Program Host	Jennylyn Mercado	Nominated	
