= Regine Tolentino =

Filipino TV host, actress, dancer, fashion and designer

- Born: Regine Tolentino Maristela; Irvine, California, U.S.
- Agent: Star Magic
- Children: 3
- Relatives: CJ Tolentino (cousin)

Regine Tolentino (born Regine Tolentino Maristela) is a Filipino-American corporate and TV host, actress, dancer, fashion designer, social media influencer, model, and businesswoman.

== Career ==
Tolentino was among the first batch of talents launched by ABS-CBN's Talent Center, now Star Magic, during its first year in December 1995.

In 1997, Tolentino became the first Filipino VJ of MTV Asia.

Tolentino has been very active on television and movies for more than two decades as an actress, TV host, celebrity judge and professional dancer, she was even dubbed as the Dance Diva.

Tolentino also works as a social media influencer, designer, inspirational speaker and licensed dance fitness instructor travelling the world for events and appearances.

== Personal life ==
Tolentino was married to actor Lander Vera Perez. The couple met on the set of ABS-CBN's teen drama anthology Flames. They secretly wed in a civil wedding on June 18, 1997 and remarried four months later in a church wedding. Tolentino and Vera Perez separated in 2001 but eventually got back together. They separated again in 2015. In 2016, Tolentino confirmed that she and Vera Perez have parted ways and ended their eighteen years of marriage Tolentino and Vera Perez together have two children, Azucena Reigne and Alyssandra Reigen.

== Filmography ==
=== Television ===
Year	Title	Role	Notes	Source
1996	Flames			
1999–2004	Digital LG Quiz	Herself - Host		
2001	Klasmeyts	Herself		
2003	Hawak Ko Ang Langit	Rebecca		
2003-2018	Unang Hirit	Herself - Host		
2005–2010	Shall We Dance?	Herself - Judge		
2007	Stars on Ice	Herself - Judge		
2010	Sine Novela: Ina, Kasusuklaman Ba Kita?	Gina		
2012–2013	A Beautiful Affair	Sophia Imperial		
2013	Be Careful with My Heart	Corrine		
2015	Sabado Badoo	Guest Cameo Appearance	Herself	
2016	Maalaala Mo Kaya	Dance Teacher	Episode: "Pole"	
2022	It's Showtime	Herself - Judge	"Girl on Fire" segment	
2025	Rainbow Rumble	Herself - Contestant		

=== Film ===
Year	Title	Role	Notes	Source
2003	Dayo	Sofia		

== Awards and nominations ==
Year	Work	Award	Category	Result	Source
2004	Digital LG Quiz	PMPC Star Awards for Television	Best Game Show Host (with Paolo Bediones)	Won	
