= Mornings @ GMA =

Philippine television news and talk show

- Title card
- Genre: News broadcasting; Talk show
- Country of origin: Philippines
- Original languages: English; Tagalog

Production
- Camera setup: Multiple-camera setup
- Running time: 90 minutes
- Production company: GMA News and Public Affairs

Original release
- Network: GMA Network
- Release: April 13, 1998 – December 3, 1999

Mornings @ GMA is a Philippine television news broadcasting and talk show broadcast by GMA Network. It premiered on April 13, 1998. The show concluded on December 3, 1999.

== Hosts ==
Hosts

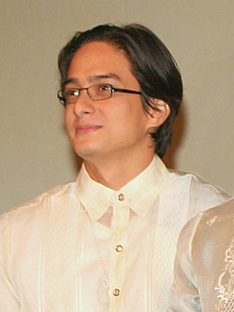
Ryan Agoncillo

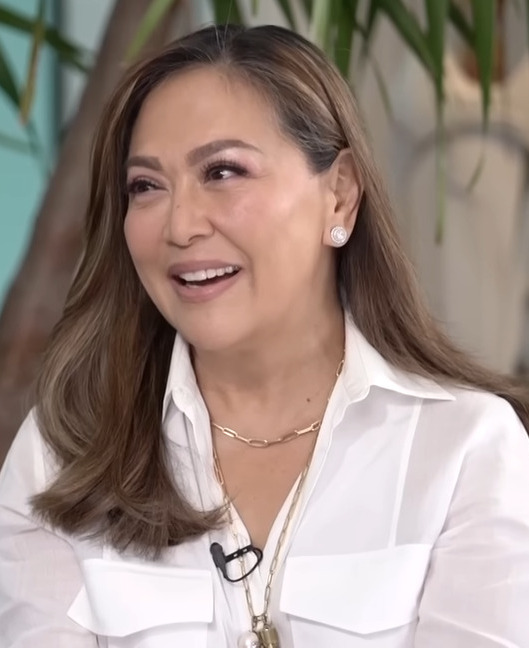
Karen Davila

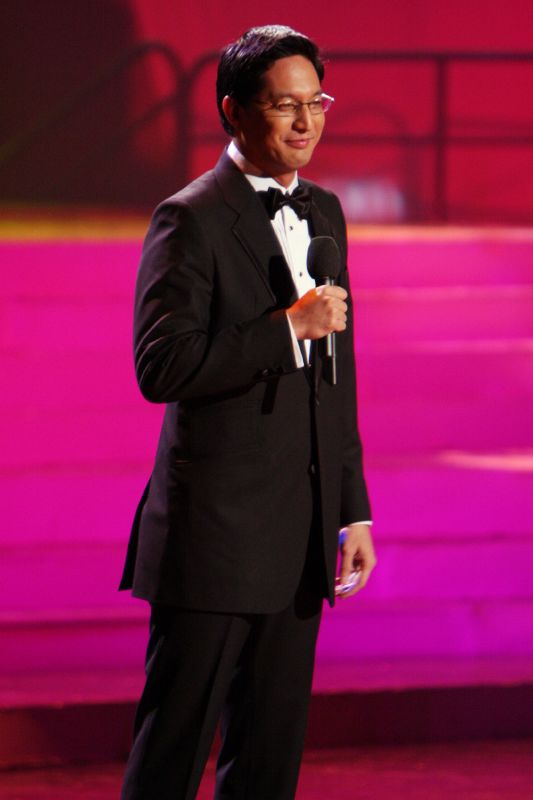
Paolo Bediones

- Mon Isberto
- Tisha Silang
- Cher Calvin
- Paolo Bediones
- Ryan Agoncillo
- Suzie Entrata
- Lyn Ching
- Arnold Clavio
- Karen Davila
- Kara David
- Georgette Tengco
- Oscar Oida
