= Asian Americans in Los Angeles =

Asian Americans makeup 11.7% of Los Angeles’ population as of 2020.

There are more Chinese, Filipino, Korean, Taiwanese, Cambodian, Thai, Indonesian, Sri Lankan, and Burmese Americans living in Los Angeles County than all other counties in the United States of America. South Asians are among Los Angeles County’s fastest growing ethnic groups including Bangladeshi (122%), Pakistani (59%), Sri Lankan (45%), and Indian (29%). This excludes Middle Eastern or Arab Americans, based on the official US Census Bureau.

Asians are concentrated in the San Gabriel Valley. The Asian American population in San Gabriel Valley grew by 22% between 2000 and 2010. There is also a large Asian population in Monterey Park, South San Gabriel, and Montebello.

Between 2010 and 2020, the population of Asian American residents in the city grew by 8.2%.

There are around 930,000 Asian Americans and 7,700 Native Hawaiian and Pacific Islander immigrants living in Los Angeles County.

== Neighborhoods ==
Chinatown, followed by Monterey Park and Cerritos have the highest Asian population.

During the 1980s, Monterey Park, Koreatown, Long Beach, Torrance, and Cerritos each welcomed a population of Asian people ranging from 10,000 to 18,000. Santa Clarita has a fast growing Asian community.

== See also ==
- History of Chinese Americans in Los Angeles
- History of the Japanese in Los Angeles
- Filipinos in Los Angeles
- Indian Americans in Greater Los Angeles
- Korean Americans in Greater Los Angeles
- Taiwanese Americans in Los Angeles
