= Digital LG Quiz =

Philippine television game show

- Title card
- Also known as: Digital LG Challenge (Note: 2003–04.)
- Genre: Game show
- Directed by: Pat F. Perez
- Presented by: Paolo Bediones; Regine Tolentino; Pia Guanio
- Country of origin: Philippines
- Original languages: English; Filipino

Production
- Executive producers: Lenny C. Parto; Wilma Galvante; Joel Jimenez
- Production locations: GMA Broadway Centrum, Quezon City, Philippines
- Camera setup: Multiple-camera setup
- Running time: 60 minutes
- Production companies: Alta Productions; LG Electronics

Original release
- Network: GMA Network
- Release: October 23, 1999 – 2004

Digital LG Quiz is a Philippine television quiz show broadcast by GMA Network. Hosted by Paolo Bediones and Regine Tolentino, it premiered in 1999. The show was reformatted and retitled as Digital LG Challenge in 2003, with Bediones and Pia Guanio as the hosts. The show concluded in 2004.

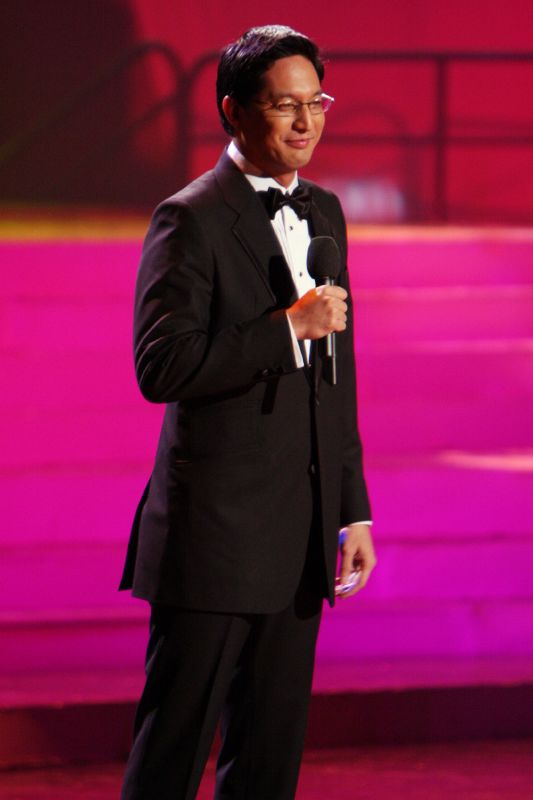
Paolo Bediones serves as a host.

== Grand Champions (in bold or highlight) and Finalists ==
Year 1 (1999–2000)

Contestant	School	Beginning	Password	Picture Puzzle	Think-Tac-Toe	Blockbusters	Megabytes	Total score
Benjo Delarmente	La Salle Green Hills, Mandaluyong	100	0	0	0	0	-60	40
Mark Andrew Lim	Manila Science High School, Manila	100	0	60	80	60	-20	280
Brian C. Lagason	Regional Science High School, Olongapo City	100	0	60	10	60	80	310
Celeste "Akee" Castro	Nueva Ecija University of Science and Technology, San Isidro, Nueva Ecija	100	0	30	0	0	-10	120

Year 2 (2000–2001)

Contestant	School	Beginning	Password	Picture Puzzle	Think-Tac-Toe	Blockbusters	Megabytes	Total score
Chrysanthus Herrera	Philippine Science High School, Quezon City	100	40	30	40	90	-20	280
Andrew John Lena	Manila Science High School, Manila	100	50	90	60	30	60	390
Gerald Joseph Andrew "Jayjay" Atienza	Mary Immaculate Parish Special School, Las Piñas	100	50	30	40	30	40	290
Jeb Bersana	Elizabeth Seton School, Las Piñas	100	10	0	20	0	-10	120

Year 3 (2001–2002)

- **Laurence Lloyd Parial - Nueva Ecija University of Science and Technology - San Isidro, Nueva Ecija - 320 points**
- Renerio Salonga - Makati Hope Christian School, Makati
- Jonathan "Jed" Yabut - Colegio de San Juan de Letran, Manila
- Renz Jerome Caliguia - St. Vincent's Academy, Apalit, Pampanga

Year 4 (2002–2003)

- **John Sithli Mendoza - Makati Science High School, Makati**
- Carmen Fernandez - OB Montessori Center, Quezon City
- Miguel Karlo De Jesus - Manila Science High School, Manila
- John Carlo B. Timbol - Philippine Science High School, Quezon City

Year 5 (2003–2004)

- **Joseph Sy - La Salle Green Hills, Mandaluyong**
- Milli Pangilinan - St. Paul University, Quezon City
- Emir T. Hembrador - Novaliches High School, Quezon City
- John David Perez - Fortridge Asian School, Makati

== Accolades ==
Accolades received by Digital LG Quiz
Year	Award	Category	Recipient	Result	Ref.
2001	15th PMPC Star Awards for Television	Best Game Show	Digital LG Quiz	Won	
2001	15th PMPC Star Awards for Television	Best Game Show Hosts	Paolo Bediones Regine Tolentino	Won	
