= Walang Tulugan with the Master Showman =

Philippine television variety show

- Title card
- Also known as: Master Showman Presents (Note: 1997–2005.)
- Genre: Variety show
- Directed by: Bam Salvani
- Presented by: German Moreno
- Theme music composer: Vehnee Saturno; Tats Faustino
- Opening theme: "Walang Tulugan"
- Ending theme: "Walang Tulugan"
- Country of origin: Philippines
- Original language: Tagalog
- No. of episodes: 977

Production
- Executive producer: Jocelyn Balvino
- Production locations: GMA Broadway Centrum, Quezon City, Philippines (1997–2001, 2004–08); Studio 1, GMA Network Center, Quezon City, Philippines (2001–04); Studio 5, GMA Network Center, Quezon City, Philippines (2008–11); Studio 6, GMA Network Studio Annex, Quezon City, Philippines (2011–16)
- Camera setup: Multiple-camera setup
- Running time: 90–120 minutes
- Production company: GMA Entertainment TV

Original release
- Network: GMA Network
- Release: February 8, 1997 – February 13, 2016

Walang Tulugan with the Master Showman (transl. no sleeping with the master showman; formerly known as Master Showman Presents) is a Philippine television variety show broadcast by GMA Network. Originally hosted by German Moreno, along with John Nite, Shermaine Santiago, Jackie Lou Blanco and Shirley Fuentes, it premiered on February 8, 1997, on the network's Saturday evening line up. The show concluded on February 13, 2016, with a total of 977 episodes.

Known for its tagline "Walang Tulugan!", it is the longest running late night variety television show in the Philippines.

== Overview ==
The show was originally titled Master Showman Presents. It premiered as a late-night variety talk show similar to GMA Supershow in the late 1970s. Master Showman was German Moreno's trademark moniker during his reign as one of television's top hosts in the early 1980s and 1990s, due to his hosting roles in variety shows such as GMA Supershow and That's Entertainment.

When GMA Network decided to make a title out of his famous moniker, Moreno introduced the catchphrase "Walang Tulugan!" (transl. no sleeping!) during the show. Master Showman originally aired live from the GMA Broadway Centrum in Quezon City, Philippines. When the show moved to GMA Network Center, it ceased its live broadcast and filmed two episodes instead, every other Friday. In 2005, Walang Tulugan was incorporated in the show's title.

On January 8, 2016, Moreno died due to cardiac arrest. A special live tribute episode was filmed at Our Lady of Mount Carmel Shrine, Quezon City on January 9, where Moreno's wake was being held.

Actress Nora Aunor, became a temporary main host of the show. Aunor said that she was "willing" to continue the advocacy of Moreno to help establish the careers of young aspirants that wish to join Philippine entertainment industry. The show aired its final episode on February 13, 2016.

== Cast ==
Hosts

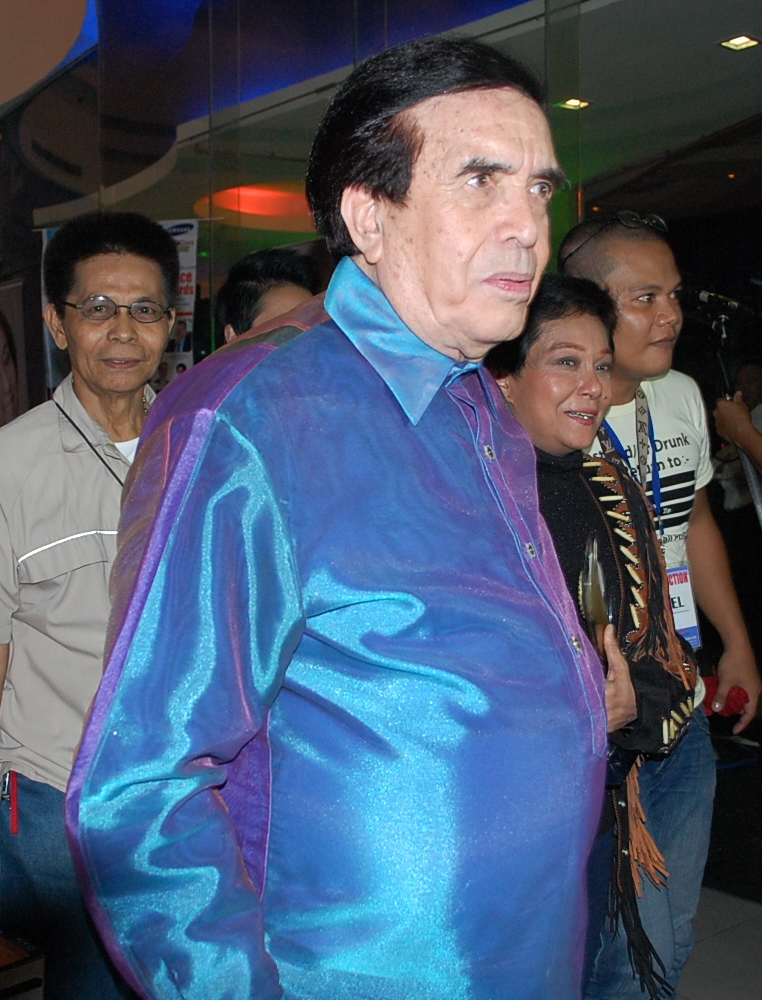
German Moreno

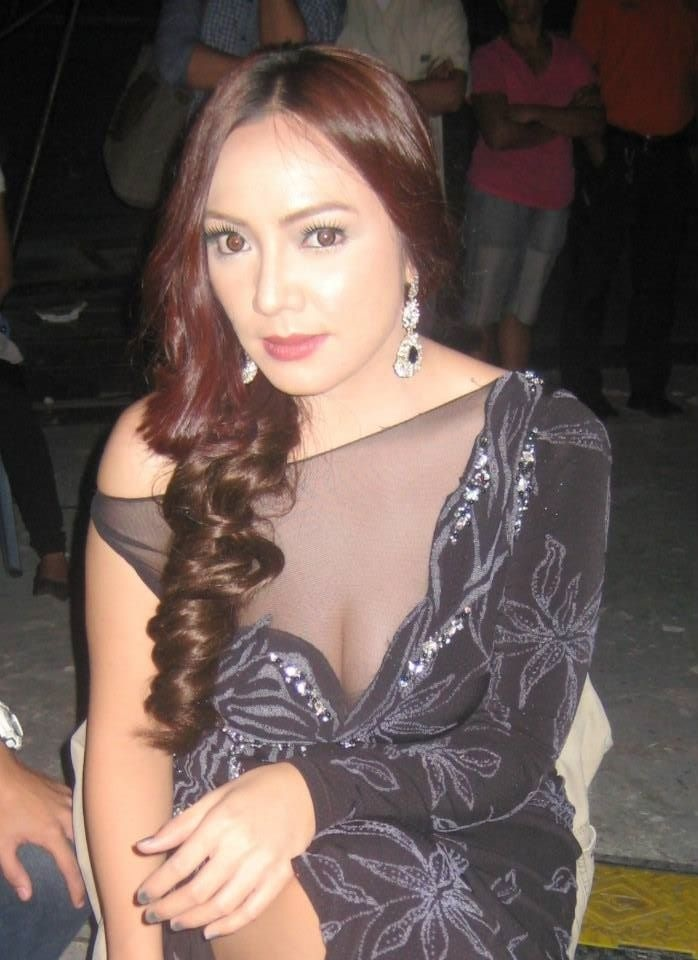
Shermaine Santiago

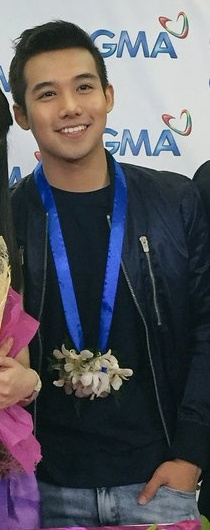
Ken Chan

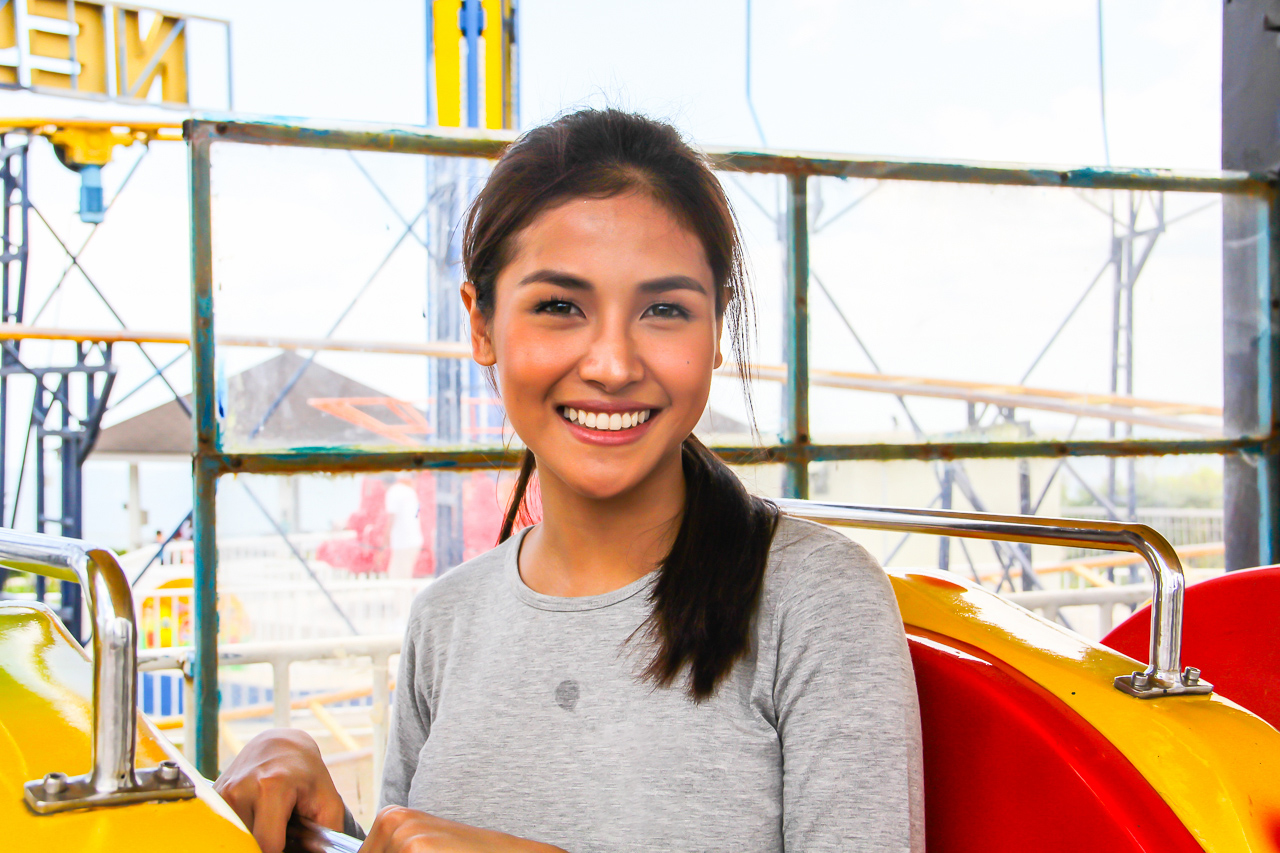
Sanya Lopez

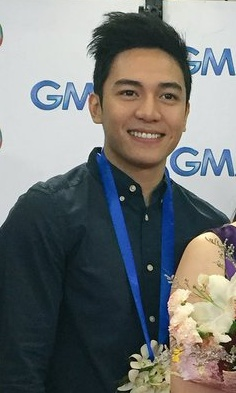
Jak Roberto

- German Moreno (1997–2016)
- John Nite (1997–2016)
- Mariz Ricketts (1997–2013)
- Billy Crawford (1997–2008)
- Shalala (2001–10; 2014–16)
- Shermaine Santiago (1999–2016)
- Shirley Fuentes (until 2016)
- Hero Angeles (2006–10)
- Martha Joy (2007–10)
- Jackie Lou Blanco (2008–16)
- Mico Aytona (2008–10)
- Jake Vargas (2008–16)
- Marlo Mortel (2009–12)
- Rhen Escaño (2010–16)
- Michael Pangilinan (2010–16)
- Hiro Peralta (2010–16)
- Teejay Marquez (2010–13)
- PJ Valerio
- Derek Viray
- Ken Chan (2011–16)
- Eian Rances (2011–16)
- Kokoy de Santos (2012)
- Vince Gamad (2012–16)
- Jak Roberto (2012–16)
- Mara Alberto
- Sanya Lopez (2012–16)
- Boobsie (2012–13)
- Yasser Marta
- Rob Gomez (2013)
- Buboy Villar (2013–16)
- Renz Valerio (2013–16)
- Pauline Aguilar (2013–15)
- Prince Villanueva (2014–16)
- Ali Asistio (2015–16)
- Dale Rossly (2013–16)
- Lloyd Abella
- Vince Camua
- Jacob Danan
- Sharmaine Santos
- Lance Gutierrez
- Renato Ramos Jr.
- Emil Paden
- Per Paden
- KD Rossly
- Angelo Carreon
- Jolo Romualdez
- Kassie De Guzman
- Marika Sasaki (2014–16)
- Trisha Bernales
- Mart Catacutan
- Franz Nichols
- Anjo Alfonzo
- Claire Borja
- Earl Gatdula
- Delmar "Dhell" Cruz
- John Patrick Picar
- Yna Uy
- Jose Konrado Amedo
- Jameelah Bowden

Segment hosts

- Aster Amoyo (2012–16, Celebrity Talk)
- Hideaki Torio (Eh Kasi Ewan)
- John-na Chuchi (2013–16, Diva Dingdings)
- Mega Oohlala (2013–16, Diva Dingdings)
- Fresh

Groups

Upgrade

- Rhem Enjavi
- Mark Baracael
- Armond Bernas
- Ivan Lat
- Casey Martinez
- Miggy San Pablo
- Raymond Tay

Detour

- JC Cruz
- Dell Ramirez
- Allan Santarin

== Segments ==
- Barkadahan
- Celebrity Talk
- Diva Dingdings
- Eh Kasi Ewan
- Fan Kita
- John Ka Na Naman
- LSS: Love Song Para Sa'Yo
- OPM Greats

== Ratings ==
According to AGB Nielsen Philippines' Mega Manila household television ratings, the final episode of Walang Tulugan with the Master Showman scored a 3.3% rating.

== Accolades ==
Accolades received by Walang Tulugan with the Master Showman
Year	Award	Category	Recipient	Result	Ref.
2005	Golden Screen TV Awards	Outstanding Male Host in a Musical or Variety Program	German Moreno	Nominated	
2005	Golden Screen TV Awards	Outstanding Musical or Variety Program	Master Showman Presents Walang Tulugan	Nominated	
2007	21st PMPC Star Awards for Television	Best Female TV Host	Jackie Lou Blanco	Nominated	
2007	21st PMPC Star Awards for Television	Best Male TV Host	German Moreno	Nominated	
2007	21st PMPC Star Awards for Television	Best Musical Variety Show	Walang Tulugan with the Master Showman	Nominated	
2008	22nd PMPC Star Awards for Television	Best Male TV Host	German Moreno	Nominated	
2008	22nd PMPC Star Awards for Television	Best Musical Variety Show	Walang Tulugan with the Master Showman	Nominated	
2009	23rd PMPC Star Awards for Television	Best Male TV Host	German Moreno	Nominated	
2009	23rd PMPC Star Awards for Television	Best Musical Variety Show	Walang Tulugan with the Master Showman	Nominated	
2010	24th PMPC Star Awards for Television	Best Musical Variety Show	Walang Tulugan with the Master Showman	Nominated	
2011	25th PMPC Star Awards for Television	Best Musical Variety Show	Walang Tulugan with the Master Showman	Nominated	
2012	26th PMPC Star Awards for Television	Best Male TV Host	German Moreno	Nominated	
2012	26th PMPC Star Awards for Television	Best Musical Variety Show	Walang Tulugan with the Master Showman	Nominated	
2012	26th PMPC Star Awards for Television	Best New Male TV Personality	Michael Pangilinan	Nominated	
2013	27th PMPC Star Awards for Television	Best Musical Variety Show	Walang Tulugan with the Master Showman	Nominated	
2014	28th PMPC Star Awards for Television	Best Male TV Host	German Moreno	Nominated	
2014	28th PMPC Star Awards for Television	Best Musical Variety Show	Walang Tulugan with the Master Showman	Nominated	
2014	28th PMPC Star Awards for Television	Best New Female TV Personality	Marika Sasaki	Nominated	
2014	28th PMPC Star Awards for Television	Best New Female TV Personality	Yna Uy	Nominated	
2014	28th PMPC Star Awards for Television	Best New Male TV Personality	John Pol Dimaculangan	Nominated	
2014	28th PMPC Star Awards for Television	Best New Male TV Personality	Prince Villanueva	Nominated	
2015	29th PMPC Star Awards for Television	Best Musical Variety Show	Walang Tulugan with the Master Showman	Nominated	
2016	30th PMPC Star Awards for Television	Best Musical Variety Show	Walang Tulugan with the Master Showman	Nominated	
