= Peter Musñgi =

Filipino media executive, voice over artist, and radio DJ

- Born: Peter A. Musñgi
- Education: University of the East; Ateneo de Manila University
- Occupations: Media Executive; Voice Actor; Announcer; Radio DJ; News Anchor
- Years active: 1972–present
- Agent(s): ABS-CBN Corporation (1972; 1987–present); Government of the Philippines (Presidential Communications Office; early 1980s–1987); GMA Network (2023–present); Advanced Media Broadcasting System (2024–present)
- Children: 3
- Presenting career
- Show: N/A (Station ID)
- Stations: Intercontinental Broadcasting Corporation (early 1980s–1987); Banahaw Broadcasting Corporation (1984–1986); ABS-CBN (1987–2020); Kapamilya Channel and Kapamilya Online Live (2020–present); DZMM/DWPM; GTV and GMA Network (2023–present); All TV (2024–present)
- Country: Philippines

Peter A. Musñgi (Tagalog pronunciation: [ˈmusŋi]), also known as Peter Rabbit, is a Filipino media executive, voice over artist, radio DJ and news anchor, best known as the main voice-over artist or announcer of the Philippine media companies ABS-CBN Corporation and Advanced Media Broadcasting System since March 1, 1987 and April 15, 2024, respectively, for ABS-CBN free-to-air channel, Kapamilya Channel and its broadcast feed on All TV, Kapamilya Online Live and All TV, Star Cinema film trailers and as narrator of the respective network's shows and their associated teasers and trailers as such being the former's primary voiceover upon the launch of A2Z on October 10, 2020 with Lloyd Oliver Corpuz being the secondary, and GMA Network for It's Showtime on GTV and GMA since July 1, 2023.

Before rejoining ABS-CBN on March 1, 1987, Musñgi was the voiceover of Intercontinental Broadcasting Corporation (IBC) from early 1980s to February 1987 and Banahaw Broadcasting Corporation (BBC) from 1984 to its closure on September 7, 1986.

== Early life and education ==
Peter A. Musñgi was born to Dominador Musñgi, a manager at the Rice and Corn Administration and a part-time bet-taker (kristo) at a cockfighting arena in Santiago, Isabela, from whom he inherited his trademark voice.

Musñgi finished his last two years of high school at La Salette Seminary in Santiago. Musñgi graduated from the University of the East with a degree in business administration, major in accounting, in 1972. A year later, he passed the CPA Board Exam. At the Ateneo de Manila University, he earned his Master of Business Administration degree.

== Career ==
As a high school student, Musñgi served as a DJ for a local pop radio station where a relative was the manager. Following his stint as a radio personality, he was tapped to provide voice as announcer in commercials and film trailers.

He became known to the wider public when he accidentally sang the nursery rhyme, "Little Peter Rabbit" over the radio which caught the attention of actress and radio personality, Helen Vela. This performance led to Musñgi being dubbed as “Peter Rabbit”.

Musñgi first joined ABS-CBN Corporation in 1972, as an announcer for the media conglomerate's radio station 101.9 DZMM FM, learning how to play a prepared and approved list of songs as well as doing time check and voiceovers for the station ID. He was one of many unemployed after ABS-CBN was shut down following the declaration of Martial Law by President Ferdinand Marcos on September 23, 1972. He later worked for various other AM radio stations.

From 1984 until its closure on September 7, 1986, Musñgi became the voiceover of Banahaw Broadcasting Corporation (BBC). He was also the voiceover of Intercontinental Broadcasting Corporation (IBC) from early 1980s to February 1987. Six months after ABS-CBN's reopening in September 1986, Musñgi returned to ABS-CBN on March 1, 1987 where he then became its main voiceover since then replacing George Boone Mercado who was the conglomerate's and network's voiceover when ABS-CBN reopened on September 14, 1986 until the launch of Star Network branding in March 1987, notably being the voiceover or announcer of the television channel of the same name, and its successors Kapamilya Channel, Kapamilya Online Live, and All TV.

From 1988 to 1994, he was also station manager of DZMM and DWRR. He is a key person in ABS-CBN's Manila Radio Division and ABS-CBN Sports.

Musñgi was the voiceover for various commercials, such as Zest-O - Way To Go Zest-O and Classic Casino Filipino of Philippine Amusement and Gaming Corporation (PAGCOR) TVCs.

With the launch of A2Z on October 10, 2020, Musñgi is ABS-CBN's primary voiceover or announcer, with Lloyd Oliver Corpuz of A2Z being the secondary. He is also the voiceover of GMA Network only with It's Showtime since July 1, 2023 on GTV and GMA, and Kapamilya Channel broadcast feed on All TV since April 15, 2024.

== Style ==
In his childhood, Musñgi had already developed an interest in creating his own voice. He said that in his home province, there were no television yet and he would often listen to the radio. Musñgi said that he initially imitated the voices he heard on the radio before developing his own voice-over style. He also read newspapers aloud as part of honing his voice. He has once cited Joonee Gamboa as one of his inspirations in developing his own style.

== Filmography ==
=== Television ===
Year	Title/Role	Notes
Early 1980s–1987	IBC	Voiceover/Announcer
1984–1986	BBC	Voiceover/Announcer
1987–2020	Main ABS-CBN terrestrial channel	Voiceover/Announcer
1989–1995	Eat Bulaga!	Voiceover/Announcer
2003–2005	Kumikitang Kabuhayan	Host
2013–2018	Teka Muna	Co-host with Pat-P Daza
2018–2020	Pasada Sais Trenta	Co-host with Pat-P Daza
2020–present	Kapamilya Channel and Kapamilya Online Live	Voiceover/Announcer
2021–present	Rated Korina	Voiceover/Announcer
2020–2023	Pasada sa TeleRadyo	Co-host with Rica Lazo
2023–2024	Pasada	Co-host with Rica Lazo
2023–present	GTV, GMA Network, and Kapuso Stream	Voiceover/Announcer (for It's Showtime only)
2024–present	Balitapatan	
2024–present	All TV	Voiceover/Announcer

== Radio ==
Year	Title	Notes
2013–2018	Teka Muna	Co-host with Pat-P Daza
2018–2020	Pasada Sais Trenta	Co-host with Pat-P Daza
2023–2024	Pasada	Co-host with Rica Lazo
2024–present	Balitapatan	Co-host with Rica Lazo
2024–present	FM Radio 92.3	Voice, in reference to ABS-CBN's final sign-off
