= Kumikitang Kabuhayan =

- Also known as: Chicken, Pork, Atbp.
- Genre: Informative
- Directed by: Abner Mercado
- Presented by: Peter Musñgi; Alex Santos
- Narrated by: Peter Musñgi
- Country of origin: Philippines
- Original language: Filipino

Production
- Executive producer: Blessie Calupitan
- Producer: Ira Panganiban
- Running time: 30 minutes
- Production company: ABS-CBN News and Current Affairs

Original release
- Network: ABS-CBN
- Release: 2003 – 2005

Kumikitang Kabuhayan (English: profitable business) (formerly Chicken, Pork, Atbp.) is a Philippine television infotainment show broadcast by ABS-CBN. Originally hosted by Peter Musñgi, it aired from 2003 to 2005. Alex Santos serve as the final host. The program imparts effective tips on how to start a business and make it on the edge. The program also tackles about agriculture and other farming concerns.

== See also ==
- Swak na Swak
- List of programs broadcast by ABS-CBN
