= Pia Guanio =

Filipino actress and host (born 1974)

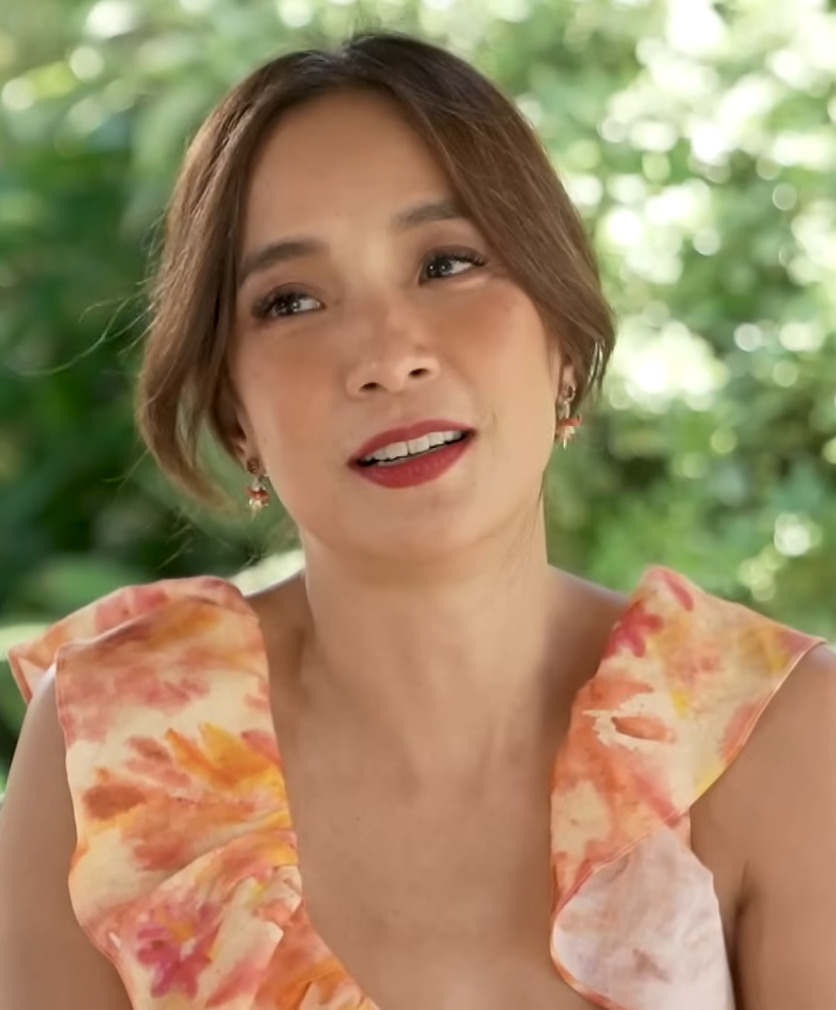
- Guanio in 2023
- Born: Liana Pia Coronado Guanio; October 24, 1974 (age 52); Manila, Philippines
- Education: University of the Philippines Diliman
- Occupation: Television presenter
- Years active: 1999–present
- Spouse: Steve Mago (m. 2011)
- Children: 2

Liana Pia Coronado Guanio-Mago (Tagalog: [ˈpija ˈgwɐnjɔ]; born October 24, 1974) is a Filipina television presenter. She served as an anchor of Showbiz Central and 24 Oras, and a former co-host of Eat Bulaga!. She currently hosts Kada Umaga on NET25.

== Career ==
Liana Pia Coronado Guanio was born on October 24, 1974. She graduated from the University of the Philippines Diliman as a broadcasting major. Guanio's first job in the entertainment industry was as a researcher and segment producer on The Inside Story. Her first on-air role was on cable television network Lakbay TV, as well as a traffic reporter on Caltex Roadwatch, a traffic segment aired on various radio stations.

After Lakbay TV, Guanio was one of the hosts of ABS-CBN's morning show Alas Singko Y Medya. In 2003, she moved to GMA Network, and became a host of noontime variety show Eat Bulaga!. She later became an anchor on 24 Oras for the showbiz news segment Chika Minute. She also hosted the talk shows S-Files and Showbiz Central.

In 2015, Guanio left 24 Oras after 11 years on the program. She was replaced by Iya Villania as Chika Minute anchor.

In 2021, Guanio left Eat Bulaga! because of personal reasons. In the same year, she moved to Net 25, where she hosts the network morning show, Kada Umaga.

== Personal life ==
Guanio has been romantically linked in the past to her long-time boyfriend, Mark Zulueta, and was later said to be engaged to variety show entertainer and actor Vic Sotto. Sotto and Guanio broke up in 2010. Several months later, Guanio married businessman Steve Mago on October 1, 2011. The couple have two daughters: Scarlet Jenine (born August 30, 2012) and Soleil Brooklyn (born May 29, 2017).

Guanio is a board member of Best Buddies Philippines, and is an advocate of social inclusion.

== Filmography ==
=== Film ===
| Year | Title | Role | Notes |
|---|---|---|---|
| 2003 | Mr. Suave | | Special participation |
| 2006 | Enteng Kabisote 3: Okay ka, Fairy Ko: The Legend Goes On and On and On | Darling | |
| 2008 | Dobol Trobol: Lets Get Redi 2 Rambol! | | Cameo role |
| 2009 | Ang Darling Kong Aswang | Aip | |
| 2009 | A Mother's Story | | Special participation |

=== Television ===
==== As herself ====
| Year | Program | Notes |
|---|---|---|
| 2001–2004 | Alas Singko Y Medya | As host |
| 2002–2003 | Magandang Tanghali Bayan | As host |
| 2003–2021 | Eat Bulaga! | As host, various segments |
| 2003–2004 | Digital LG Challenge | As host |
| 2004–2007 | S-Files | As host |
| 2004–2015 | 24 Oras | As Chika Minute anchor |
| 2005 | A Telefantastic Christmas | |
| 2005–2008 | Ang Pinaka | As host |
| 2007 | Bakekang | As herself |
| 2007–2012 | Showbiz Central | As host |
| 2010 | Beauty Queen | As host |
| 2010 | Survivor Philippines: Celebrity Showdown | As press conference host |
| 2013–2021 | Home Base Plus | As host |
| 2014 | The Ryzza Mae Show | As guest |
| 2016 | Kalyeserye | As model on Yaya Dub's Fashion Show |
| 2021–present | Kada Umaga | As host |

==== As actress ====
| Year | Program | Role | Notes |
|---|---|---|---|
| 2005 | Special | | Eat Bulaga! Lenten drama special |
| 2007–2009 | Ful Haus | Grace Palisoc | Main cast |
| 2014 | Kulungan Kanlungan | Aura | Eat Bulaga! Lenten drama special |
| 2015 | Lukso ng Dugo | Mildred | Eat Bulaga! Lenten drama special |
| 2016 | Dalangin ng Ama | Tanya | Eat Bulaga! Lenten drama special |
| 2017 | Kapatid | Ms. Buenaventura | Eat Bulaga! Lenten drama special |

== Awards ==
| Year | Association | Category | Work | Result |
|---|---|---|---|---|
| 2014 | 5th Golden Screen TV Awards | Outstanding Female Host in a Musical or Variety Program | Eat Bulaga! | Nominated |
| 2014 | Dabarkads Awards 2014 | Best Actress | Kulungan Kanlungan | Nominated |
| 2015 | Dabarkads Awards 2015 | Best Actress | Lukso ng Dugo | Nominated |
