= S-Files =

Philippine television talk show

- Title card
- Genre: Talk show
- Presented by: Paolo Bediones; Lyn Ching; Pia Guanio; Joey Marquez; Janice de Belen; Richard Gomez; John Lapus; Toni Gonzaga
- Country of origin: Philippines
- Original language: Tagalog
- No. of episodes: 464

Production
- Camera setup: Multiple-camera setup
- Running time: 90–120 minutes
- Production company: GMA Entertainment TV

Original release
- Network: GMA Network
- Release: June 7, 1998 – April 22, 2007

S-Files is a Philippine television talk show broadcast by GMA Network. Originally hosted by Paolo Bediones and Lyn Ching, it premiered on June 7, 1998. The show concluded on April 22, 2007, with a total of 464 episodes. Pia Guanio, Richard Gomez, Joey Marquez and John Lapus served as the final hosts.

== Hosts ==
Hosts

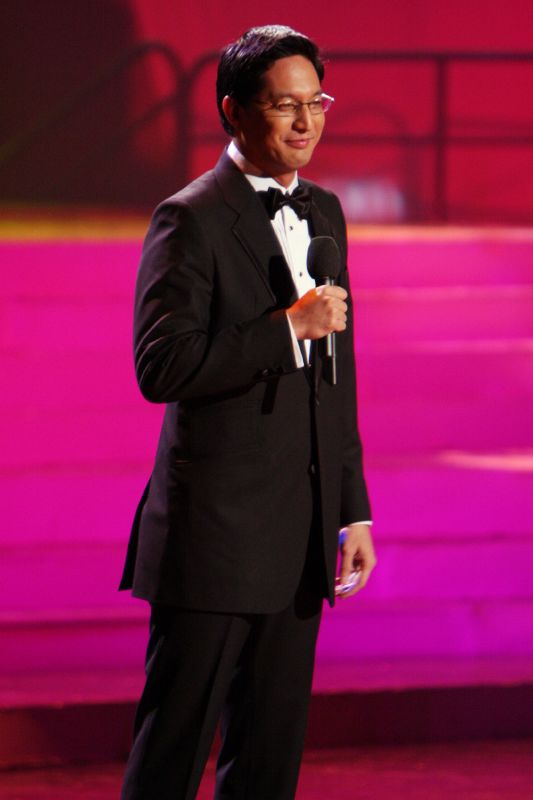
Paolo Bediones

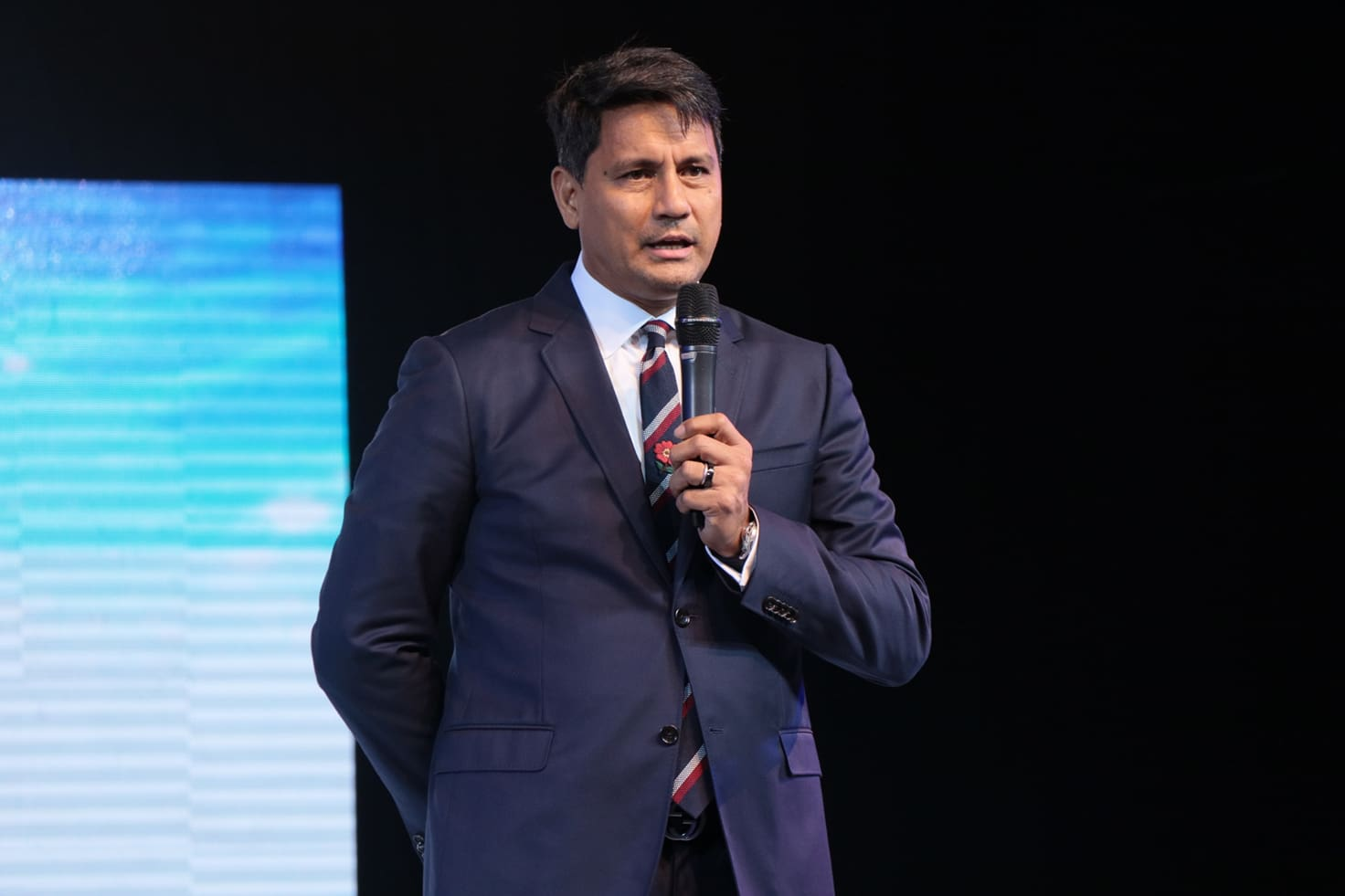
Richard Gomez

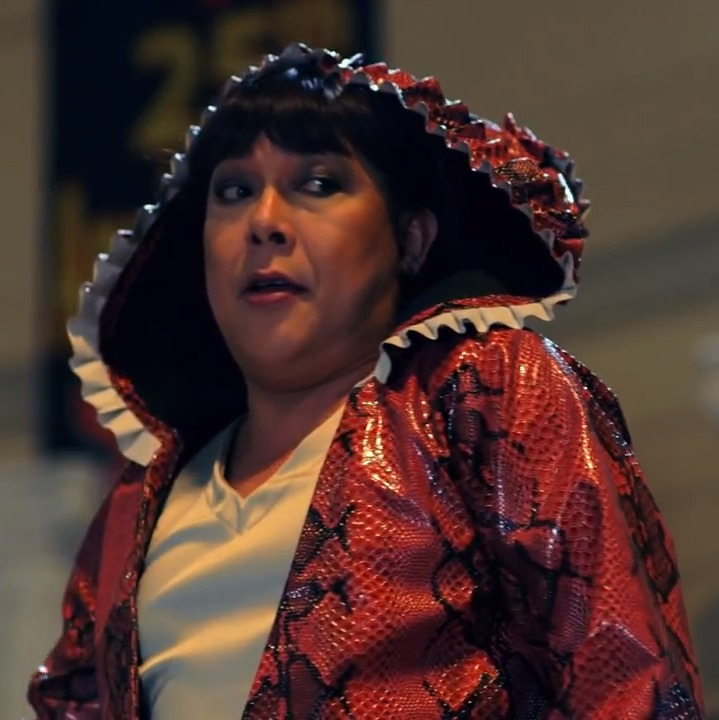
John Lapus

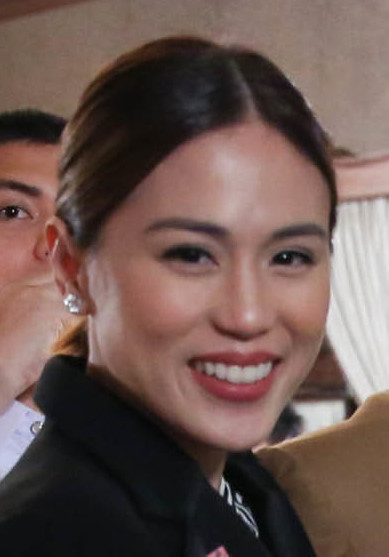
Toni Gonzaga

- Paolo Bediones (1998–2007)
- Lyn Ching-Pascual (1998–2001)
- Janice de Belen (2001–04)
- Toni Gonzaga (2004–05)
- Pia Guanio (2004–07)
- Richard Gomez (2002–07)
- Joey Marquez (2003–07)
- John Lapus (2006–07)
- Princess Violago (2006–07)

== Accolades ==
Accolades received by S-Files
Year	Award	Category	Recipient	Result	Ref.
2005	Golden Screen TV Awards	Outstanding Showbiz-Oriented Program	S-Files	Nominated	
2005	Golden Screen TV Awards	Outstanding Showbiz-Oriented Program Host	Paolo Bediones	Nominated	
2007	21st PMPC Star Awards for Television	Best Female Showbiz Oriented Talk Show Host	Pia Guanio	Nominated	
2007	21st PMPC Star Awards for Television	Best Male Showbiz Oriented Talk Show Host	Paolo Bediones	Nominated	
2007	21st PMPC Star Awards for Television	Best Male Showbiz Oriented Talk Show Host	John Lapus	Nominated	
2007	21st PMPC Star Awards for Television	Best Showbiz Oriented Talk Show	S-Files	Nominated	
