= Debate with Mare at Pare =

Philippine television public affairs show

- Title card in 2001
- Genre: Public affairs
- Presented by: Solita Monsod; Oscar Orbos
- Country of origin: Philippines
- Original language: Tagalog

Production
- Producers: Marissa Flores; Louela Trinidad
- Camera setup: Multiple-camera setup
- Running time: 60 minutes
- Production company: GMA News and Public Affairs

Original release
- Network: GMA Network
- Release: November 18, 1998 – November 2, 2006

Debate with Mare at Pare (transl. debate with mare and pare) is a Philippine television public affairs debate show broadcast by GMA Network. Hosted by Oscar Orbos and Solita Monsod, it premiered on November 18, 1998. The show concluded on November 2, 2006.

== Hosts ==
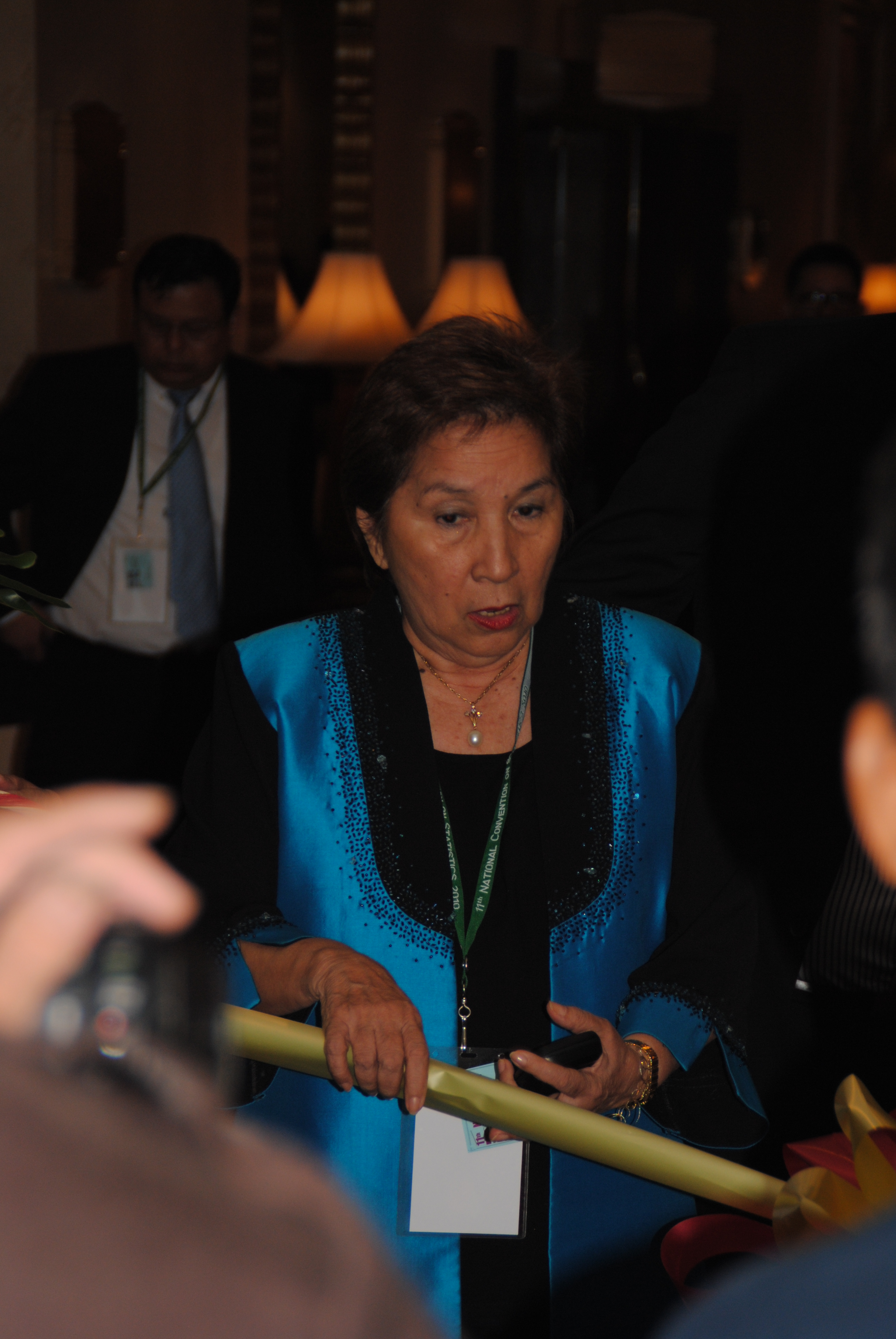
Winnie Monsod served as a host.

- Oscar "Pareng Oca" Orbos
- Solita "Mareng Winnie" Monsod

== Accolades ==
Accolades received by Debate with Mare at Pare
Year	Award	Category	Recipient	Result	Ref.
2006	20th PMPC Star Awards for Television	Best Public Affairs Program	Debate with Mare at Pare	Won	
2006	20th PMPC Star Awards for Television	Best Public Affairs Program Host	Winnie Monsod Oscar Orbos	Won	
