= Paolo Bediones =

Filipino journalist (born 1974)

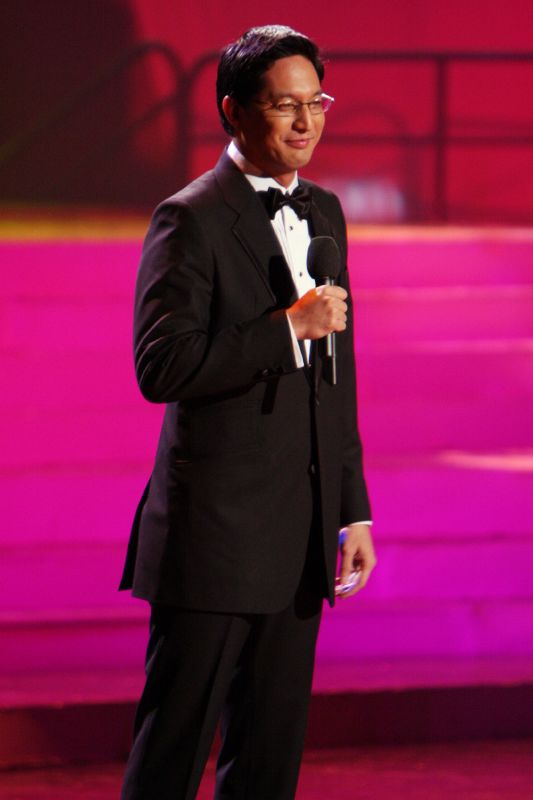
- Bediones hosting Binibining Pilipinas 2008
- Born: Paolo Antonio Barba Bediones; March 17, 1974 (age 52); Roxas City, Capiz, Philippines
- Occupations: Television presenter, journalist, newscaster, radio commentator, entrepreneur, actor
- Years active: 1995–2022 (television career)
- Partner: Lara Morena (engaged)
- Children: 1
- Relatives: Mariano Marcos (great-grandfather); Angelo Barba (uncle)

Paolo Antonio Barba Bediones (born March 17, 1974) is a Filipino television host, newscaster, radio commentator and occasional actor.

Bediones started his career as a commercial model, and later transitioned to television show hosting. He is best known for hosting GMA Network's Extra Challenge and Survivor Philippines. He is now a TV host and the newest newscaster on TV5.

On December 3, 2009, Bediones announced in a press conference that he had signed a three-year exclusive contract with TV5.

== Personal life ==
Bediones is the only son of four children born to Rodolfo Pineda Bediones (from Roxas, Capiz) and María Teresa Barba, who separated when Paolo was still young. His mother María is the daughter of Fortuna Marcos-Barba, a sister of former President Ferdinand Marcos, making him grandnephew to the late president Ferdinand E. Marcos Sr, and a nephew of President Bongbong Marcos His paternal great-grandfather was Máximo Bediones (1820–1932) who sired a son at the age of 99.

His previous girlfriend was former beauty queen Abby Cruz. He has a daughter named Avery with fiancée, actress Lara Morena.

== Career ==
=== Hosting ===
Bediones is a former TV host of a defunct MTV Philippines program Para, Bos! and Gameplan TV where he won "Best TV Host" alongside co-hosts Suzi Entrata-Abrera and Mondo Castro of the band The Pin-Ups. His previously hosted shows on GMA Network are Channel S, Gameplan, Digital LG Challenge (formerly Digital LG Quiz), Extra Extra, Extra Challenge, ETChing, S-Files, Mornings @ GMA, Whammy! Push Your Luck, Unang Hirit, Tok! Tok! Tok! Isang Milyon Pasok, Pinoy Meets World, and Survivor Philippines (Seasons 1 and 2) on GMA and hosted Sapul sa Singko (formerly Sapul) on TV5.

He returned to hosting as the host of Extreme Makeover: Home Edition Philippines, which premiered on TV5 in 2012. He later hosted Rescue 5, Demolition Job, and Astig, also on TV5.

=== Newscasting ===
In 2010, Bediones became a news anchor of Aksyon alongside Cheryl Cosim and later Erwin Tulfo. This was his first time as a newscaster for News5.

He was also given a public affairs program USI: Under Special Investigation on TV5 which aired every Sunday night.

On February 18, 2011, Bediones left Aksyon for Aksyon JournalisMO as a replacement to Martin Andanar. There, he joined Cheri Mercado and Jove Francisco.

On February 22, 2012, Bediones joined with Cheri Mercado to anchor a former news program entitled Pilipinas News replacing the former news program, Aksyon Journalismo.

On July 21, 2014, Bediones reunited with Cheryl Cosim for a new news program entitled Aksyon Tonite. He left the newscast in late August, as he would shortly start a new restaurant business.

In 2021, after 5 years of his hiatus, Bediones returned to anchor Frontline sa Umaga, marking his 5th overall news program on News5 via TV5. It premiered last May 10, 2021, on TV5. On January 17, 2022, Bediones left the newscast due to pending lawsuits filed by former employees of Ei2 Technologies, Inc.

=== Radio ===
Bediones was an announcer for Radyo5 92.3 News FM as a member of News5. He hosted Sakto kay Paolo, Sakto (rin) kay Cheri and the renamed Trabaho Lang with Cheri Mercado.

== Filmography ==
=== Film ===
Year	Title	Role
2003	Walang Kapalit	Teddy
2005	Exodus: Tales from the Enchanted Kingdom	Haring Bantayan
2009	Shake, Rattle & Roll XI	Newscaster

=== Television ===
Year	Title	Role
1995–1997	Channel S	Host
1996–1998	Text Game Show (Philippine TV Game Show)	Host
1997–1998	Etching: Entertainment Today w/ Lyn Ching	Host
1997	Gameplan	Host
1998–1999	Mornings @ GMA	Host
1998–2007	S-Files	Host
1999–2004	Digital LG Quiz	Host
1999–2003	Extra! Extra!	Host
2001–2002	Ikaw Lang ang Mamahalin	Paolo
2001–2003	Digital LG Challenge	
2002–2003	Extra Service: Income	Exhibitionist
2002–2003	Extra Horn	Performer
2002–2003	Extra Ordinaryo	Analyst
2002	The Great Globe Adventure	Host
2002	Txter's V	Host
2003	Via Crusis	
2003–2006	Extra Challenge	Host
2003	Para Bos!	Host
2004–2006	Reporter's Notebook	Reporter
2006	Mars Ravelo's Captain Barbell	Prof. Brando / Captain B
2006	Pinoy Meets World	Host
2007–2008	Whammy! Push Your Luck	Host
2008	Survivor Philippines (season 1)	Host
2008	Tok! Tok! Tok! Isang Milyon Pasok	Host
2007–2009	Unang Hirit	Host
2009	Survivor Philippines: Palau	Host
2010–2012	USI: Under Special Investigation	Host
2010–2011	Aksyon	News Anchor
2011–2012	Aksyon JournalisMO	News Anchor
2011–2012	Sapul sa Singko	Host / Anchor
2012–2014	Pilipinas News	News Anchor
2012–2013	Good Morning Club	Host / Anchor
2012	Extreme Makeover: Home Edition Philippines	Host / Team Leader
2013–2015	Rescue 5	Host / Team Leader
2013–2015	Demolition Job	Host
2013–2014	Astig!	Host
2014	Aksyon Tonite	News Anchor
2014–2015	Aksyon sa Umaga	News Anchor
2015	Sabado Badoo	Cameo Footage Featured
2016	Kapuso Mo, Jessica Soho	Cameo Footage Featured
2017–2020	Good Vibes	Host
2021–2022	Frontline sa Umaga	News Anchor

=== Online series ===
Year	Title	Role
2020	My Day: The Series	Special Participation / TV host

== Awards and recognitions ==
- Winner, Best Showbiz Oriented Talk Show Host for S-Files - 2005 PMPC Star Awards For Television (Tied w/ Boy Abunda of "The Buzz")
- Winner, Best Reality Competition Program Hosts for Extra Challenge - PMPC Star Awards For Television (2004, 2005 & 2006) (w/ Ethel Booba)
- Winner, Best Travel Show Hosts for Pinoy Meets World - 21st PMPC Star Awards For Television 2007 (w/ Miriam Quiambao)
- Winner, Best Reality Show Host for Survivor Philippines - 23rd PMPC Star Awards For Television (2009)
- Hall of Fame Winner - Aliw Awards (2000–2006)

== See also ==
- TV5 (Philippine TV network)
- GMA Network
