= List of films banned in the Philippines =

The following is a list of films banned in the Philippines. This list includes films which were banned for public screening in the Philippines by law by virtue of being given an "X" or "Banned" rating or by being deemed "not fit for public exhibition" by the Movie and Television Review and Classification Board (MTRCB).

== List ==
=== Feature films ===
Date	Film	Years active	Notes
1938	Ang Batang Tulisan	N/A	For the depiction of a priest in a villainous role and usage of a hypodermic syringe as a murder tool.
1940	Chapayev	N/A	For promoting Communist ideology.
1965	Iginuhit ng Tadhana	N/A	Banned during the presidency of Diosdado Macapagal for featuring then-Senator Ferdinand Marcos, who was Macapagal's main political opponent.
1977	Hubad na Bayani	N/A	The film, released during the martial law era, depicted the human rights violations during the Marcos regime. President Marcos banned the film from showing theatrically, which led to the establishment of a tradition of protesting naked, which became known as the Oblation Run.
1980	The Shining	1980-2018	It was rated X after its initial release. However, it was lifted and changed to R-16 to endure the audiences.
1980	Cannibal Holocaust	1980	Banned due to its extremely violent content and actual on-screen killings of animals.
1988	The Last Temptation of Christ	1988-permanent	The Martin Scorsese drama was banned because of allegations that it was anti-religion.
1989	Dear Uncle Sam	N/A	For its critical stance towards American military presence in the Philippines. The Americans at that time maintained bases in Clark and Subic.
1989	Orapronobis	N/A	For its progressive and subversive message regarding the government of President Corazon Aquino.
1993	Schindler's List	1993-1994	Initially banned for scenes involving humping and nudity involving the film's lead actors which was viewed as "pornographic" by the MTRCB. The ban was overturned in 1994 with the film's historical merits cited as a reason.
1993	The Piano	1993-1994	Banned due to alleged sex scene.
1994	Natural Born Killers	Permanent	Banned due to extreme violence and gruesome images.
1996	The Bridges of Madison County	N/A	Given an "X" rating by the MTRCB due to a scene of partial nudity involving the character portrayed by lead actress Meryl Streep. The MTRCB has stated that it could reclassify the film as rated R if the offending scene was cut from the film for screening in the Philippines.
1999	Butakal: Sugapa sa Laman	N/A	The MTRCB ordered a ban on the film loosely based on the Chiong murder case, following an appeal by the Chiong family to President Joseph Estrada and the filing of an injunction that led to the MTRCB reversing its initial permit for release with an R-rating. This led to a protracted legal case after the film's director, Federico Natividad, sued the MTRCB for not returning the film's master copy when it ordered its seizure as part of an administrative review, which was finally resolved in 2007 in favor of Natividad by the Supreme Court, which nevertheless upheld the ban on the film's showing.
2000	Live Show	Permanent	MTRCB's permission for the film to be screened was rescinded by then-President Gloria Macapagal Arroyo in 2001 after Cardinal Jaime Sin and other local Roman Catholic leaders lobbied for the ban. The film tackles the plight of poor Filipino boys and girls resorting to featuring in sex shows in Manila as a means of livelihood. The film was permanently banned from exhibition in theaters.
2003	Imelda	N/A	Initially banned, after Imelda Marcos, on whom the biopic is based, filed a lawsuit which was later cancelled
2006	Ang Mabuhay para sa Masa	N/A	Produced, directed, and starring former President Joseph Estrada while he was detained for one of his many plunder cases. It was banned for challenging the rule of President Arroyo, who succeeded him after he was ousted in the second EDSA Revolution. It alleged that the Catholic Church cooperated with prominent business leaders to depose Estrada. It was banned by the MTRCB for "libelous and false" content.
2008	Aurora	N/A	Producers applied to have the film classified as R-18 due to the movie geared towards a mature audience. Given by a "double X" rating by the MTRCB due to an alleged rape scene.
2009	Antichrist	Permanent	Banned due to explicit sexual and misogynistic violent content involving castration.
2009	Brüno	2009	A mockumentary film was banned due to homosexual obscenity, was lifted and heavily cut by MTRCB as R-18 rated.
2012	Innocence of Muslims	N/A	An independent film which caused widespread protest by Muslims worldwide due to depicting Islam's prophet Muhammad in a negative light. The Supreme Court ordered the MTRCB to ban the public screening of the film.
2013	Ang Huling Cha-Cha ni Anita	N/A	A film about a prepubescent girl who falls in love with an older woman, it was initially rated X by the MTRCB before being reclassified as R-16 following a reevaluation.
2017	Bliss	2017	Although it was originally rated X due to its depiction of excessive sex and violence, Tarog confirmed that the film had been reevaluated to an "R-18" rating without cuts.
2019	Abominable	Permanent	Banned due to the appearance of a map featuring the nine-dash line which depicts the South China Sea as part of China's territory in a scene. The Philippines claims Spratlys and Scarborough Shoal as its territory which is also claimed by China and other neighboring countries. See also: South China Sea dispute
2019	Metamorphosis	2019	A Cinema One Originals entry which featured intersex people. It was given an X rating for its "daring" scenes which were found to be sensitive content by the MTRCB, particularly a "masturbation" scene and exposure of genitals. The film was reviewed again by the MTRCB by another set of people and it was reclassified as an R-16 film taking in to consideration the whole context of the film. No re-edits or cut were made on the film.
2021	Paglaki Ko, Gusto Kong Maging Pornstar	Permanent	On January 14, 2021, the comedy-drama film was rated X by the MTRCB due to sexual content and indecent language, deeming it unfit for public viewing.
2022	Uncharted	Permanent	Banned due to the appearance of a treasure map featuring the nine-dash line found in the underground scene, which depicts the South China Sea as part of China's territory.
2024	Chasing Tuna In The Ocean	Permanent	Banned due to the scenes showing the nine-dash line in the South China Sea claimed by China as its territory.
2024	Alipato at Muog	2024	A documentary about the 2007 abduction and disappearance of activist Jonas Burgos that was banned for undermining "faith and confidence in the government and/or constituted authorities". It was later reclassified as R-16 by the MTRCB following a second review.
2024	Dear Satan	Permanent	A film about a child writing a Christmas letter to Santa Claus which was received by Satan which MTRCB chair Lala Sotto described as "offensive" for Christians. Despite the film being renamed as Dear Santa by its producers, the MTRCB upheld its X rating, saying that the film's positive depiction of Satan served as "an attack on fundamental belief of the Catholic and Christian faiths."
2025	Dreamboi	2025	A body horror film featuring a trans woman, the film was rated X by the MTRCB following two reviews in October due to "prolonged sexually explicit scenes". It was reclassified as R-18 following a third review on October 21.
2025	The Carpenter's Son	Permanent	A biblical horror film based on the childhood of Jesus Christ, the film was rated X by the MTRCB following two reviews in October for offending religious sentiments for its presentation of Jesus as “rebellious, malicious, or seemingly under demonic influence”, along with other usage of religious imagery deemed offensive.

=== Short films ===
Date	Film	Notes
2010	Ganito tayo ngayon, Paano na tayo bukas?	Short film part of ABS-CBN's AmBisyon series. The film follows a newspaper; from the time of its delivery to a homeowner to the time it was used to wipe off feces from a foot of a cart-pushing vendor. The particular newspaper used a controversial January 2010 issue which featured the economic achievements of then-President Arroyo. The film was given an "X" rating by the MTRCB for "undermining the faith and confidence of the people in government."
2010	Ayos Ka?	Short film part of ABS-CBN's AmBisyon series. The short film is a music video which featured a hopeful soundtrack juxtaposed with imagery of poverty, illegal drug use, prostitution, and murder. The MTRCB gave the film an "X" rating "injurious to the prestige of the Republic of the Philippines and its people."

== See also ==
- List of television series suspended in the Philippines
- Cinema of the Philippines
- Censorship in the Philippines
