= List of television series suspended in the Philippines =

The following is a list of television series which had their airing suspended by the Movie and Television Review and Classification Board (MTRCB) in the Philippines for a period of time.

== List ==
Series	Original network	Date	Notes
Magandang Tanghali Bayan	ABS-CBN	1999	The show was suspended for almost one month due to the massive risqué jokes of its main hosts Randy Santiago, John Estrada and Willie Revillame during the question and answer portion of its segment Calendar Girl.
Ang Dating Daan	UNTV	2004	The broadcast of the religious program was suspended for 20 days (later upgraded to three months) due to slander and use of offensive and obscene language by its televangelist-host Eli Soriano, as a mean of disciplinary action.
I-Witness	GMA	2006	The documentary program was placed on a two-week suspension after featuring an episode on "Lukayo", a ritual dance from Laguna that showed old women dancing while wearing wooden phalluses of exaggerated sizes and another ritual that featured masturbation.
It's Showtime	ABS-CBN	2010	In January, the variety show was suspended for 20 days due to guest judge Rosanna Roces making denigrating remarks towards teachers. The MTRCB also directed the filing of criminal charges against Florida Tan, ABS-CBN vice-president for programming, and other officers responsible for the violation. However, the suspension lasted for only six days after the Court of Appeals issued a 60-day temporary restraining order against the MTRCB.
Willing Willie	TV5	2011	The variety show received a month-long suspension after a child performed a suggestive dance while crying in front of the audience on its live broadcast. It was also placed under probation, meaning that the show needed daily permits from the MTRCB before airing after the suspension was lifted.
T3: Kapatid, Sagot Kita!	TV5	2012	On May 10, the public service program received a 20-day suspension due to comments on actors Raymart Santiago and Claudine Barretto on its live broadcast. Before that, a brawl between the hosts' brother, Ramon Tulfo and the latter couple happened at Ninoy Aquino International Airport Terminal 3. TV5 questioned the MTRCB's decision to suspend the program, stating that the action was heavy-handed and called it an act of censorship, though it was then lifted after a couple of days. On May 30, the MTRCB imposed another suspension until lasting from May 31 to August 31 due to the same issue. After the suspension the program was placed under probation, meaning it needed daily permits from the MTRCB before airing until the board was convinced otherwise. However, the suspension was once again lifted on June 21, this time under a 60-day temporary restraining order from the Court of Appeals.
It's Showtime	ABS-CBN (Kapamilya Channel)	October 14–27, 2023	On the July 25 episode, hosts Vice Ganda and his partner Ion Perez licked the icing of the cake using their fingers, during the Isip Bata segment. The board imposed a 12-day suspension on the variety show for "alleged indecent acts". It's Your Lucky Day led by Luis Manzano temporarily replaced It's Showtime for the time being.
Gikan sa Masa, para sa Masa and Laban Kasama ang Bayan	SMNI	December 18, 2023	The board issued a two-week suspension against the two programs "to prevent further violations or protect the interest and welfare of the public." This followed allegations of broadcasting false and defamatory content that saw SMNI being investigated by the House of Representatives for possible franchise violations.

== See also ==
- List of films banned in the Philippines
- Censorship in the Philippines
