= Kontrobersyal =

- Genre: News journal
- Presented by: Boy Abunda
- Country of origin: Philippines
- Original language: Filipino

Original release
- Network: ABS-CBN
- Release: May 10, 2003 – 2006

Related
- The Bottomline with Boy Abunda

Kontrobersyal (English: controversial) is a Philippine news journal hosted by Boy Abunda on ABS-CBN that aired from May 10, 2003 to 2006.
