= Marissa Laguardia =

Filipino government official

Chairperson of the Movie and Television Review and Classification Board
- In office March 14, 2003 – October 10, 2010
- Preceded by: Mari-Len Dinglasan
- Succeeded by: Grace Poe

Personal details
- Born: Ma. Consoliza Perez
- Spouse: Carlitos Laguardia (died 1997)
- Children: 3

Ma. Consoliza "Marissa" Perez Laguardia is a Filipino government official who was the chairperson of the Movie and Television Review and Classification Board from 2003 to 2010.

== Education ==
Ma. Consoliza "Marissa" Perez Laguardia studied at the College of the Holy Spirit Manila from the elementary to the college level. She obtained a degree in economics at Holy Spirit.

== Career ==
=== Early years ===
Laguardia has been an investment trader with the Philippine National Bank from 1983 to 1999. She became part of the Movie and Television Review and Classification Board (MTRCB) since the chairmanship of Alejandro Roces.

=== MTRCB chairman ===
Marissa Laguardia was appointed as chairperson of the MTRCB on March 6, 2003 during the administration of President Gloria Macapagal Arroyo, replacing Mari-Len Dinglasan. She took over from Officer in charge Dennis Manikad on March 14, 2003. Her earlier pledges was for the MTRCB to obtain a permanent office.

Under her administration, the MTRCB would often suspend the noon-time show Magandang Tanghali Bayan.

The MTRCB 2006 biographic film, Ang Mabuhay para sa Masa about former President Joseph Estrada, was initially given a XXX rating, prohibiting the public exhibition of the film. The Da Vinci Code was given an R-18 rating in 2006, which meant that the screening of the film was allowed despite protest from the religious sector. Congressman Bienvenido Abante led a campaign for the abolishment of the MTRCB due to this action.

On October 30, 2007, Laguardia tenure was extended after she was reappointed as MTRCB chairperson. The MTRCB entered with a deal with the Department of Public Works and Highways in January 2008 for the construction of a new office.

The MTRCB has often reprimanded television host Willie Revillame. Rufa Mae Quinto meanwhile was reprimanded for her revealing outfits.

A new MTRCB Building was built from 2009 to 2010 which the MTRCB will occupy once it vacates the New San Jose Builders-owned President Tower along Timog Avenue in Quezon City. The MTRCB completed their transfer to the new MTRCB Building still in Timog Avenue in April 2010.

=== Post-chairmanship ===
Laguardia was appointed by President Rodrigo Duterte as a member of the MTRCB in 2017.

== Personal life ==
Marissa Laguardia was married to Carlitos Laguardia, with whom she had three children. Her husband died in 1997. She is also related to the pre-World War II matinee idol Ernesto Laguardia.
