= Gretchen Barretto =

Filipino actress (born 1970)

- Born: Gretchen Castelo Barretto; March 6, 1970 (age 56); Manila, Philippines
- Occupation: Actress
- Partner: Antonio Cojuangco Jr.
- Children: 1
- Relatives: Julia Barretto (niece); Antonio "Junior" Morales y Barretto (uncle); Shaila Dúrcal (cousin); Alberto Barretto (great-granduncle)
- Family: Marjorie Barretto (sister); Claudine Barretto (sister)

Gretchen Castelo Barretto (Tagalog: [ˈgɾɛtʃɛn baˈrɛto]; born March 6, 1970) is a Filipino former actress and businesswoman. She was launched in Regal Films' 14 Going on Steady as a singer-actress, with the release of her debut single "Going Steady", which served as the soundtrack single to her debut film. In the late eighties, Barretto rose to prominence after gaining success in skin flicks produced by Seiko Films like Tukso, Layuan Mo Ako!, Ang Bukas Ay Akin, Ama, Bakit Mo Ako Pinabayaan?, Lumayo Ka Man Sa Akin and Bakit Ako Mahihiya?. She has released two studio albums under Star Records. Her debut album, Unexpected, was released in 2008, and her second album Complicated was released a year after. Her two younger sisters, Marjorie and Claudine, and niece Julia are also actresses. She has been a contract star of ABS-CBN since 2010.

Since 2017, Barretto has been associated with cockfighting magnate Atong Ang.

== Early life ==
Barretto is the fifth out of seven children of Miguel Alvir Barretto and Estrella Castelo Barretto.

== Career ==
=== 1984–1987: Early career beginnings ===
Barretto was launched as one of the newest Regal Babies together with former child actress Janice de Belen and upcoming actress Nadia Montenegro. Barretto released her debut single entitled "Going Steady", which was also the official theme song of the film 14 Going on Steady in which she top-billed along with de Belen and Montenegro. The single was critically panned but became a radio hit in the Philippines. Rumors swirled about the rift between Barretto and de Belen about who should have sung the soundtrack single. In the aforementioned film, Barretto was chosen to record the song, while de Belen got more screen time dancing to the song as shown in the film credits. Barretto continued to star in films like Ang Mga Kuwento ni Lola Basyang, Paalam, Bukas ang Kasal Ko, Life Begins at 40 and Goat Buster. Despite being launched as a singer-actress, Barretto never got the chance to record a studio album due to the annual films lined up for her. She soon dropped out of high school to fully concentrate on her acting career.

=== 1988–1993: Softcore films and hosting stint ===
In 1988, Barretto was signed by Robbie Tan to become a contract star of Seiko Films. In 1989, Barretto's image was revamped from being a teenybopper actress to a full-fledged sex siren. She appeared in several films like Ang Lihim Ng Golden Buddha, Ipaglalaban Ko, Tukso, Layuan Mo Ako!, Ama, Bakit Mo Ako Pinabayaan and Paminsan-Minsan. Due to the string of successful softcore films she starred in, Barretto, along with actresses Rita Avila, Cristina Gonzales and Rina Reyes, were tagged as the "ST Queens" (which stands for "sex trip") since they were among the most popular softcore actresses in Philippine cinema at that time.

In 1992, while shooting the film Ako ang Katarungan, Barretto was involved in a highly controversial relationship with married actor Bong Revilla whom she had an affair with for four months. Barretto moved back to her home studio Regal Films in that same year. Some of her biggest films included Bakit Ako Mahihiya? and Kailangan Kita in which she was paired opposite Gabby Concepcion, all of which were produced by Regal Films. In 1994, Barretto embarked on a hosting career. She joined Boy Abunda in the late night talk show Show & Tell. It was in that same year that she ended her contract with Seiko Films in an attempt to make her image more wholesome and commercial to the public. Barretto left Show & Tell after she became pregnant with Tonyboy Cojuangco's love child. She was replaced in the show by another sexpot in Anjanette Abayari. The show was canceled in less than a year, after poor ratings.

In 1993 Barretto was linked to the Brunei beauties affair.

=== 1994–1999: Public scandals and pregnancy ===
In June 1994, Barretto stood as the whistleblower to the Manila Film Festival scandal. In that said event, Barretto presented the award for Best Actress alongside Miss Universe Mauritius beauty queen Viveka Babajee and actor Rocky Gutierrez, where both announced actress Ruffa Gutierrez as the recipient of the award when it was Aiko Melendez who actually won the award. Rocky Gutierrez was caught on camera slipping the envelope with the winner's name in his pocket while Babajee was heard uttering the words "Take it! Take it!" while handing the award to Ruffa Gutierrez. The same incident happened to the announcement of the winner of Best Actor in which Ruffa Gutierrez and actress Nanette Medved declared Gabby Concepcion as the winner, when it was actor Edu Manzano who was the real recipient of the award. Barretto revealed that it was Concepcion's agent, Lolit Solis and Gutierrez' mother, Annabelle Rama (who was also Babajee's talent agent) who masterminded the apparent fraud, and she also told reporters that Solis promised her a Best Actress win, a year later if she kept quiet about this plan. Solis pleaded guilty to the offense of orchestrating the hoax, while siblings Ruffa and Rocky Gutierrez, Medved and Babajee were all charged with estafa.

A year later, Barretto got pregnant and gave birth to a daughter named Dominique. She also went public in announcing her relationship with billionaire business tycoon Antonio "Tonyboy" Cojuangco Jr., a man twenty years her senior. Cojuangco admitted to being the father of Barretto's daughter. Barretto took a hiatus in showbiz to concentrate on her life as a mother, and partner to Cojuangco.

=== 2000–2009: Comeback and music career launch ===
Throughout the late nineties, Barretto co-hosted the variety show ASAP in ABS-CBN but her serious comeback to acting began in a special portrayal in the drama series Sa Dulo Ng Walang Hanggan top-billed by sister Claudine Barretto in 2001. Barretto revealed that it was her sister Claudine who convinced her to return to acting after a long break from being away from the spotlight. In 2001, Barretto appeared with sisters Marjorie and Claudine in Private Conversations with Boy Abunda which became her first public interview together with her siblings. In 2006, Barretto and actress Dawn Zulueta engaged in heated exchange of insults after it was reported that the latter did not approve of the prima donna behavior displayed by the former during a Pantene shampoo commercial they made along with actresses Ruffa Gutierrez and Angel Aquino. Both actresses revealed that they were not in good terms with each other in separate interviews. Several months after the said incident, Zulueta told reporters that they have finally settled this issue in private. Later that year, Barretto finally accepted the lead role in the Metro Manila Film Festival entry Matakot Ka sa Karma released by Canary Films in December 2006. Matakot Ka sa Karma became Barretto's first film since 1995's Costales and she received huge buzz regarding her movie comeback. Barretto was a no-show in the Metro Manila Film Festival Awards Ceremony as well as in the Parade of Stars several days prior to the event. The movie opened to modest reviews and placed fourth in the box office. Barretto was also set to reunite with former flame Bong Revilla in the movie Kapag Tumibok Ang Puso: Not Once, But Twice but backed out after a supposed feud arose between her and Revilla's wife Lani Mercado, during the film's pre-production. In 2007, a photo of Barretto kissing actor John Estrada circulated and went viral causing controversy in the showbiz industry. Both Barretto and Estrada denied having an affair or relationship.

In 2008, Barretto released her debut album Unexpected to signal the launch of her music career. She released the single "Please Don't Ask Me" in support of the album. She promoted Unexpected through a series of mall shows around the country. In that same year, Barretto returned to acting through an episode of Maalaala Mo Kaya where she played a mistress of a politician, opposite Phillip Salvador and Tonton Gutierrez. It was in this drama anthology that Barretto finally won her first acting award, PMPC Star Awards for TV's Best Single Performance by an Actress. A year later, she released her second album entitled Complicated and released the single "Ready to Take a Chance Again". Barretto was once again involved in a controversial relationship with Rodolfo "Dody" Puno, the Executive Director of the Road Board of the Department of Public Works and Highways. Rumors broke out that both Barretto and singer Pops Fernandez were receiving commission from the funds of the Department of Public Works and Highways, as allotted by Puno himself.

=== 2010–2015: Award wins and acting in primetime dramas ===
In 2010, Barretto returned to do another episode in Maalaala Mo Kaya portraying a widow who falls in love with a parish priest, which was portrayed by Jomari Yllana. Barretto again won another the award for Best Single Performance by an Actress in the PMPC Star Awards for Television, marking her second win in this category. Barretto embarked in her biggest television project in 2010 with the drama series Magkaribal, which originally featured Barretto opposite sister Claudine, however, the latter moved to rival network GMA during the show's pre-production. Magkaribal starred Barretto alongside actress Bea Alonzo (who became Claudine's replacement), Angel Aquino and model-actor Derek Ramsay. In that same year, Bench launched Barretto's first perfume line called Greta. Barretto won the award for Best Drama Actress in the PMPC Star Awards for Television for Magkaribal a year later. After the success of the show, Barretto was slated to star in Alta, a drama series about high society and the mining industry, with KC Concepcion and Angelica Panganiban, but the show was shelved in 2012. It was because of the cancellation of Alta that she was offered the role of Ashi Behati in Princess and I in which she portrayed the main villain to the lead stars Kathryn Bernardo and Daniel Padilla. In 2013, Barretto joined the cast of Huwag Ka Lang Mawawala at the request of the show's lead actress, Judy Ann Santos. Two months later, Barretto debuted in her first Cinemalaya film entry entitled The Diplomat Hotel.

=== 2016–present: Business ventures; alleged involvement in sabungero disappearances ===
In 2016, Barretto and her partner Antonio "Tonyboy" Cojuangco joined President Rodrigo Duterte in his state visit to Japan. By November, Barretto travelled to Taipei, Taiwan for a business meeting to support her local casino venture.

Beginning in 2017, Barretto has been involved in the casino and cockfighting businesses of Charlie "Atong" Ang, with Cojuangco also becoming involved in his casino venture at the Okada Manila.

In October 2019, Barretto was involved in a highly publicized family feud during the wake of her father, Miguel Barretto. Her attendance led to a confrontation with her sister Marjorie, reportedly requiring intervention by the security and then-President Rodrigo Duterte. The dispute escalated on social media, with Gretchen criticizing Marjorie and her niece Julia Barretto. During this time, she reconciled with her mother, Estrella, and sister Claudine, though tensions with Marjorie persisted, with legal action threatened. The controversy captivated public attention and was widely covered in Philippine media.

In July 2025, Barretto was alleged by Julie "Dondon" Patidongan, the former head of security for Ang, to have been heavily involved in Ang's perpetration of the disappearance of more than 100 cockfighters ("sabungeros") in Luzon from 2021 to 2022. Barreto (as well as Ang) has denied the allegations, filing a counter-affidavit before the Mandaluyong Regional Trial Court (RTC).

== Personal life ==
Barretto has a daughter, Dominique with common-law partner and business tycoon Antonio "Tonyboy" Cojuangco Jr. They reside in Forbes Park and Dasmariñas Village in Makati City. In November 2024, it was reported that Barretto became a billionaire in her own right.

== Filmography ==
=== Film ===
| Year | Title | Role | Note(s) | Ref. |
|---|---|---|---|---|
| 1984 | Tender Age | Gretchen | | |
| 1984 | 14 Going Steady | | | |
| 1984 | Life Begins at 40 | | | |
| 1985 | Goat Buster | Gretchen | | |
| 1985 | Miguelito: Ang Batang Rebelde | Susan | | |
| 1985 | Mga Kwento ni Lola Basyang | Diwata | (segment "Sleeping Beauty") | |
| 1986 | When I Fall in Love | Lea Marquez | | |
| 1986 | I Love You Mama, I Love You Papa | Mavel | | |
| 1986 | Paalam... Bukas ang Kasal Ko | Dingdong | | |
| 1987 | Ibigay Mo sa Akin ang Bukas | | | |
| 1987 | Bunsong Kerubin | Ellen | | |
| 1987 | Mga Lahing Pikutin | | | |
| 1987 | Asawa Ko, Huwag Mong Agawin | Agnes | | |
| 1989 | Ang Lihim ng Golden Buddha | | | |
| 1989 | Ipaglalaban Ko | | | |
| 1990 | Kung Tapos Na ang Kailanman | | | |
| 1990 | Beautiful Girl | | | |
| 1990 | Hindi Laruan ang Puso | | | |
| 1990 | Dino Dinero | Helen | | |
| 1990 | Ama... Bakit Mo Ako Pinabayaan? | Giona | | |
| 1991 | Tukso, Layuan Mo Ako! | Demonyita/Titay | | |
| 1991 | Alyas Dodong Gwapo | Dorothy | | |
| 1991 | Onyong Majikero | Queen | | |
| 1991 | Ubos Na ang Luha Ko | Mona | | |
| 1991 | Eh, Kasi Bata | Xerex | | |
| 1992 | Lumayo Ka Man sa Akin | Stella | | |
| 1992 | Paminsan-minsan | Doris | | |
| 1992 | Ako ang Katarungan (Lt. Napoleon M. Guevarra) | | | |
| 1992 | Jerry Marasigan, WPD | Dahlia | | |
| 1992 | Bakit Ako Mahihiya? | | | |
| 1993 | Johnny Tinoso and the Proud Beauty | Beauty | | |
| 1993 | Pulis Patola | Maricar | | |
| 1993 | Akin Ka...Magdusa Man Ako! | | | |
| 1993 | Kailangan Kita | Anna | | |
| 1993 | Isang Linggong Pag-ibig | Doris | | |
| 1994 | Ikaw Lamang, Wala Nang Iba | | | |
| 1994 | Alyas Totoy: Kamay Na Bakal ng WPD | Mitos | | |
| 1995 | Costales | Beth | | |
| 2006 | Matakot Ka sa Karma | Aleli | | |
| 2013 | The Diplomat Hotel | Veronica | | |
| 2014 | The Trial | Amanda Bien | | |

=== Television ===
| Year | Title | Role | Notes |
|---|---|---|---|
| 1988 | GMA Supershow | Herself (co-host) | |
| 1991 | Maalaala Mo Kaya: "Maskara" | Judith | |
| 1992 | Maalaala Mo Kaya: "Basag na Manyika" | Lynette | |
| 1994–1995 | Show & Tell | Herself (co-host) | |
| 1996–2003 | ASAP | Herself (co-host) | |
| 1999–2000 | Oki Doki Doc | Greterella | Cast member |
| 2002 | Sa Dulo ng Walang Hanggan | Andrea Fuentes-Crisostomo / Sabrina Vanguardia | Special participation |
| 2004–2007 | Lagot Ka, Isusumbong Kita | Jejen | 148 episodes (lead role) replacing Gladys Guevarra |
| 2008 | Maalaala Mo Kaya: "Salamin" | Margarita | 1 episode |
| 2010 | Maalaala Mo Kaya: "Larawan" | Maria | 1 episode |
| 2010 | Magkaribal | Victoria Valera/Anna Abella | Lead role |
| 2012–2013 | Princess and I | Ashi Behati Rinpoche | Support role / antagonist |
| 2013 | Juan dela Cruz | Helen | Guest role |
| 2013 | The Buzz | Herself (guest co-host) | Occasionally replacing Charlene Gonzalez |
| 2013 | Huwag Ka Lang Mawawala | Atty. Eva Custodio | Special participation |
| 2015 | Nathaniel | Amy Russo | Guest role |

== Discography ==
- Unexpected (2008)
- Complicated (2009)

== Awards and nominations ==
| Year | Award-giving body | Category | Nominated work | Results |
|---|---|---|---|---|
| 2007 | MYX Music Awards | Favorite Guest Appearance in a Music Video | "Minamahal Kita" by Ogie Alcasid | Nominated |
| 2009 | PMPC Star Awards for TV | Best Single Performance by An Actress | Maalaala Mo Kaya: "Salamin" | Won |
| 2010 | PMPC Star Awards for TV | Best Single Performance by An Actress | Maalaala Mo Kaya: "Larawan" | Won |
| 2011 | PMPC Star Awards for TV | Best Drama Actress | Magkaribal | Won |
| 2015 | Gawad Tanglaw | Best Supporting Actress | The Trial | Won |
