= Boy Abunda =

Filipino host (born 1961)

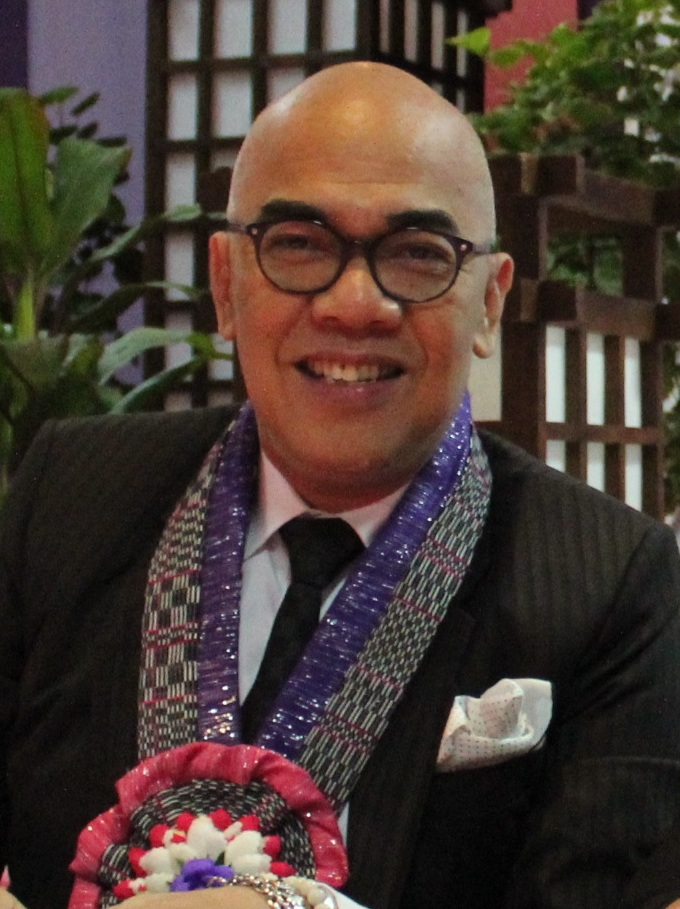
- Abunda in 2018
- Born: Eugenio Romerica Abunda Jr. October 29, 1961 (age 64); Borongan, Samar, Philippines
- Other name: Tito Boy
- Education: Ateneo de Manila University; Philippine Women's University (BA, MA, PhD)
- Occupations: Television presenter; broadcast journalist; news anchor; newspaper columnist; publicist; talent manager
- Years active: 1976–present
- Employers: GMA Network (1994–1999; 2022–present); ABS-CBN (1999–2022); Sparkle GMA Artist Center (2024–present)
- Title: King of Talk; The Icon; The Showbiz Authority
- Partner: Bong Quintana
- Relatives: Maria Fe Abunda (sister); Gemma Silvero (aunt); Anjo Damiles (grand-nephew)

YouTube information
- Channel: The Boy Abunda Talk Channel
- Years active: 2020–present
- Genre: Celebrity interviews
- Subscribers: 1.92 million
- Views: 139 million
- Last updated: August 4, 2026

Eugenio "Boy" Romerica Abunda Jr. (Tagalog pronunciation: [ʔaˈbʊnda]; born October 29, 1961) is a Filipino television presenter, publicist, and talent manager. Known as the "King of Talk", Abunda has presented several talk shows centered on the Philippine entertainment industry. On GMA, he co-presented Show & Tell (1994–1995) and Startalk (1995–1999). After transferring to ABS-CBN, he hosted The Buzz (1999–2015), Kontrobersyal (2003–2006), Homeboy (2005–2007), The Bottomline with Boy Abunda (2009–2020), and Tonight with Boy Abunda (2015–2020). He partnered with Kris Aquino in hosting Boy & Kris (2007–2009), SNN: Showbiz News Ngayon (2009–2011), and Aquino & Abunda Tonight (2014–2015). After the ABS-CBN shutdown, he returned to GMA to host Fast Talk with Boy Abunda (2023–present). In the PMPC Star Awards for Television, he has been inducted to the Hall of Fame for having won Best Celebrity Talk Show Host eleven times while Tonight with Boy Abunda was awarded Best Celebrity Talk Show four times.

An openly gay celebrity, he advocates for LGBTQ rights in the Philippines. Politician Maria Fe Abunda is his sister.

== Early life and education ==
Abunda was born Eugenio Romerica Abunda Jr. in Borongan, Samar.

He attended his primary education at Barok Elementary School for his first grade and Borongan Elementary School for his second to sixth grade. He attended his secondary education at Seminario de Jesus Nazareno.

He attended his tertiary education at Ateneo de Manila University, where he took up Business Management. However, he did not finish it because of his father's death. He left Ateneo and worked in odd jobs to support himself.

He continued his tertiary education at Philippine Women's University and graduated with degrees of Bachelor of Arts in Communication Arts in 2009, Master of Arts in Communication Arts in 2011, and Doctor of Philosophy in Social Development in 2016.

== Career ==
At the Metropolitan Theater, he worked as a stage actor and eventually as an assistant stage manager. Later, he became the assistant of the theater's administrator Conchita "Tita Conching" Sunico, who taught him public relations. In a couple of years, he started Backroom, Inc managing singers and actresses and a public relations firm. He also worked as public relations consultant for GMA Network. It was during Abunda's public relations work in GMA when one of its executives, Bobby Barreiro, suggested that he should try hosting a television show.

Abunda became a host of Show and Tell, a late night variety talk show with Gretchen Barretto, and Startalk, an entertainment talk show. He subsequently moved to GMA's competitor ABS-CBN in 1999, where he has hosted the following shows: The Buzz, Private Conversations, Homeboy, Kontrobersyal, SNN: Showbiz News Ngayon and The Bottomline with Boy Abunda, a talk show interview. He was dubbed "Asia's King of Talk" after The Bottomline was awarded Best Talk Show at the 16th Asian Television Awards (2011). He is also a newscaster for entertainment of the late-night news program Bandila. He also worked as a radio commentator for DZAR, during the Angel Radyo era. He is the founder and head of Asian Artists Agency, a talent management agency.

He also produced an album titled Melodic Conversations.

After 23 years in ABS-CBN, Abunda broke the speculations as he returned to his home network, GMA, on December 15, 2022, as part of its retrenchment program caused by the ABS-CBN shutdown from the Philippine Congress that junked the new legislative franchise to operate. He marked his free-to-air television comeback via Fast Talk with Boy Abunda in 2023. However, GMA Network gave him permission to return to ABS-CBN for hosting the Vilma Santos's 60th anniversary special, Anim na Dekada… Nag iisang Vilma.

=== 'Bilang' ===
Abunda, in joint venture with Star Music composed his first single, disco-pop 'Bilang' for Pride Month. He is credited with the lyrics and overall production of the six-soundtrack extended play ‘Say It Clear Say It Loud.’

== Personal life ==
Abunda is openly gay and has been in a relationship with partner Elmer "Bong" Quintana since 1983. Although Abunda is a practicing Roman Catholic and Marian devotee, he is a supporter of LGBTQ rights and same-sex marriage, expressing disagreement with the Church's stand on homosexuality. He denounced the 2016 Orlando Nightclub Shooting, which has been recorded as the deadliest incident of violence against LGBT people in the United States.

On June 23, 2010, Abunda became a part-time professor at Philippine Women's University, teaching radio and television to Communication Arts students. He currently resides in Quezon City.

Abunda's sister, Maria Fe Abunda, previously served as a congresswoman for Eastern Samar from 2019 to 2025 and also previously served as the mayor of Borongan from 2010 to 2019.

In 2014, Abunda was hospitalised due to a liver problem.

== Filmography ==
=== Television and online ===
Year	Title	Role	Notes	Source
1993–1995	Movie Magazine	Himself	Host	
1994–1995	Show & Tell	Himself	Host	
1995–1999	Startalk	Himself	Host	
1999–2015	The Buzz (formerly known as Buzz ng Bayan from 2013–2014)	Himself	Host	
2001–2022	Private Conversations	Himself	Host	
2003–2006	Kontrobersyal	Himself	Host	
2004–2005	Star Circle Quest	Himself	Judge	
2004–2005	Morning Star	Himself	Host	
2005–2019	Pinoy Big Brother	Himself	Talk show host	
2005–2007	Homeboy	Himself	Host	
2007–2009	Boy & Kris	Himself	Host	
2008	Volta	Ama	Supporting cast	
2008–2022	Inside the Cinema	Himself	Host	
2009–2011	SNN: Showbiz News Ngayon	Himself	Anchor	
2009	Ang Kwento naming Dalawa (Judy Ann-Ryan Love Story)	Himself	Host and narrator	
2009–2020	The Bottomline with Boy Abunda	Himself	Host	
2011–2014	Bandila	Himself	Ikaw Na! segment anchor / host	
2014–2015	Aquino & Abunda Tonight	Himself	Host	
2015	Your Face Sounds Familiar	Himself	Guest Jury	
2015–2020	Tonight with Boy Abunda	Himself	Host	
2016	Born for You	Himself	Guest	
2017	I Can Do That	Himself	Judge	
2019–2020	Your Moment	Himself	Judge	
2022	The 2022 Presidential Interviews with Boy Abunda	Himself	Host	
2022	The Interviews with the Wives and Children of the 2022 Presidential Candidates with Boy Abunda	Himself	Host	
2022	The Interviewer	Himself	Host	
2022	Fast Talk+ & Why of the 2022 Senatorial Candidates with Boy Abunda	Himself	Host	
2022	Kapuso Mo, Jessica Soho	Himself	Guest	
2022	Compañero: Remembering Sen. Rene Cayetano	Himself	Host	
2023–present	All-Out Sundays	Himself	Guest	
2023–present	Fast Talk with Boy Abunda	Himself	Host	
2023–2026	Cayetano In Action with Boy Abunda	Himself	Host	
2023	Anim na Dekada… Nag iisang Vilma	Himself	Host	
2023	Family Feud	Himself	Contestant (Team Fast Talk)	
2023	Battle of the Judges	Himself	Judge	
2023	The Political Conversations with the Mayors	Himself	Host	
2024	TiktoClock	Himself	Guest	
2024	My Mother, My Story	Himself	Host	
2025	The 2025 Senatorial Interviews	Himself	Host	

=== Film ===
Year	Title	Role
2004	Naglalayag	Himself / Cameo
2004	Volta	Ama
2008	Scaregiver	Himself
2010	Noy	Himself / Cameo
2012	Boy Pick-Up: The Movie	Himself / Cameo
2018	The Girl in the Orange Dress	Joey Marasigan

== Bibliography ==
- 2014: Make Your Nanay Proud (ABS-CBN Publishing, Inc.)
- 2017: It's Like This (ABS-CBN Publishing, Inc.)
- 2018: Nanay's Gay Boy: Two Speeches (ABS-CBN Publishing, Inc.)

== Accolades ==
- Celebrity Inductee Winner, Eastwood City Walk Of Fame Philippines in 2010
- 3rd EdukCircle Awards - Most Influential Celebrity Endorser of Year (2013)
- Winner, Best Showbiz Oriented Show Host - PMPC Star Awards for TV
  - Startalk (1995–1999)
  - The Buzz (1999–2008 and 2010) (tied with Paolo Bediones in 2005)
  - SNN: Showbiz News Ngayon (2009)
  - Hall of Fame (2011)
- Winner, Best Public Affairs Program Host - PMPC Star Awards for TV
  - Private Conversations (2004)
  - The Bottomline With Boy Abunda (2010–2011, 2015, 2016, 2017, 2018)
- Winner, Best Magazine Show Host - PMPC Star Awards for TV
  - Kontrobersyal (2004)
- Winner, Best Celebrity Talk Show Host - PMPC Star Awards for TV
  - Homeboy (2005–2007)
  - Boy and Kris (2008)
- Winner, Best Talk Show Host - UPLB Gandingan Awards
  - Homeboy (2006)
  - Boy and Kris (2007–2008)

Year	Award giving body	Category	Nominated work	Results
2000	PMPC Star Awards for Television	Best Male Showbiz-Oriented Show Host	The Buzz	Won

== See also ==
- Kim Atienza
- Ai-Ai delas Alas
- Bernardo Arévalo
- Alejandro Giammattei
- Ana Sofía Gómez
