= Lost Sabungeros =

2024 Filipino documentary film

- Directed by: Bryan Kristoffer Brazil
- Written by: Lee Joseph M. Castel (head); Mary Zeliet Paris; Mark Roland Romas
- Produced by: Joselito Chang Tan
- Cinematography: Marco Felipe Lopez
- Edited by: Eman Payumo
- Production companies: GMA Pictures; GMA Public Affairs
- Release date: November 9, 2024 (QCinema)
- Country: Philippines
- Language: Filipino

Lost Sabungeros is a 2024 Filipino documentary film produced by GMA Pictures and GMA Public Affairs–their first theatrical documentary film. Directed by Bryan Brazil, it attempts to investigate the mass disappearance of numerous sabungeros (lit. 'cockfighters') that was first reported in January 2022. Made by a team involved in the GMA television program Kapuso Mo, Jessica Soho, the film took two years to produce.

Lost Sabungeros was initially intended to have its world premiere at the Cinemalaya Film Festival in August 2024, but its screenings at the festival were cancelled due to "security concerns". Its premiere was instead held at the QCinema International Film Festival in November 2024.

== Production ==
Lost Sabungeros began production after Lee Joseph Castel, a long-time producer for the news magazine program Kapuso Mo, Jessica Soho on GMA Network, convinced GMA Pictures executive vice president Nessa Valdellon to place more resources into producing documentary films. After a six-part television special was produced for Jessica Soho in 2022 about the missing sabungeros (lit. 'cockfighters'), Bryan Brazil was hired to further develop it into a feature-length documentary film.

Brazil, who was initially unfamiliar with the world of cockfighting, focused on outreach and conducting interviews with the families of victims while many of the staff at Jessica Soho handled the research. The production had to build trust with the families of the missing sabungeros. These families had worries about their safety. Some interviewees felt they were being watched, and the filmmakers had concerns about their own security.

== Release ==
Lost Sabungeros was announced in July 2024 to be holding its premiere at the Cinemalaya Philippine Independent Film Festival in August 2024. However, its premiere was suddenly cancelled by the festival and the Cultural Center of the Philippines on August 4, four days before its screening, due to alleged "security concerns", with no further clarification given to the filmmakers in the succeeding months. GMA Pictures executive Nessa Valdellon called the cancellation "heartbreaking", while director Brazil considered it "censorship of our film."

The film ultimately held its international premiere on November 9, 2024, at Gateway Cineplex 18 for the QCinema International Film Festival, with a talk back session moderated by broadcast journalist Kara David held after the screening.

The Movie and Television Review and Classification Board (MTRCB) has declined to rate the film due to the possibility of violating the sub judice rule by commenting on a case that is still being decided in court. The lack of a rating prevents Lost Sabungeros from being screened in theaters and broadcast on television, which led GMA Public Affairs to instead tour the film in several universities beginning with the University of the Philippines Diliman on November 28, 2024.

=== Critical response ===
Lé Baltar, writing for Philstar Life, gave the film a mildly positive review, praising the film's illustration of how the lives of the victims' families were affected by their disappearance while finding fault in the documentary's non-cinematic format ("televisual approach"). He concluded that "Flawed as it may be, Lost Sabungeros interrogates how routine neglect and injustice are in our sorrowful republic, and how the course of our lives nearly runs parallel to the lives of cocks primed for a derby."

== See also ==
- Alipato at Muog, a 2024 Filipino documentary film that was able to premiere at Cinemalaya 2024 but was given a prohibitive rating by the MTRCB
- Food Delivery, a 2025 Filipino documentary film about fishermen in the West Philippine Sea that had its premiere cancelled at the CinePanalo Film Festival
