= The Bottomline with Boy Abunda =

- Title card
- Genre: Reality show Late-night talk show
- Created by: ABS-CBN Corporation
- Developed by: ABS-CBN News and Current Affairs
- Written by: Pear Clemente; MJ Felipe
- Directed by: Pinggoy Generoso
- Presented by: Boy Abunda
- Narrated by: Romnick Villar
- Country of origin: Philippines
- Original language: Tagalog
- No. of episodes: 522 (final)

Production
- Executive producer: Apples Braga-Dela Vega
- Production locations: Studio 5, ABS-CBN Broadcasting Center, Diliman, Quezon City
- Editors: Levi Ligon; Ellen Oñate-Maya; JD Payumo; TJ Payumo; Aaron Tristan de Ocampo; Cris Lopez III; John Victor Mabborang; Eljed Ellustrisismo
- Running time: 45-50 minutes
- Production company: ABS-CBN News and Current Affairs

Original release
- Network: ABS-CBN
- Release: November 28, 2009 – May 2, 2020

Related
- Aquino & Abunda Tonight; SNN: Showbiz News Ngayon; Tonight with Boy Abunda; Ikaw Na! (segment from Bandila); Fast Talk with Boy Abunda

The Bottomline with Boy Abunda was a Philippine current affairs-talk-reality show, hosted by Boy Abunda, which premiered on November 28, 2009, and aired every Saturday night on ABS-CBN. The show was taken off the air on May 2, 2020 after a total of 522 episodes.

On May 2, 2020, the show was suspended from airing due to the temporary closure of ABS-CBN because of the cease and desist order of the National Telecommunications Commission (NTC), following the expiration of the network's 25-year franchise granted in 1995. The show eventually did not go back on-air as Boy Abunda returned to GMA Network on December 15, 2022.

== Final host ==
- Boy Abunda

== Awards ==
- 2010-2011 PMPC Star Awards for Television's "Best Public Affairs Program" & "Best Public Affairs Program Host" (Boy Abunda)
- Asian Television Awards 2011 (Best Talk Show - Winner) The Bottomline with Boy Abunda
- 2013 UPLB Gandingan Awards "Most Development-Oriented Talk show" & "Best Talk show Host" (Boy Abunda)
- 2015 PMPC Star Awards for Television's "Best Public Affairs Program"
- 2016 PMPC Star Awards for Television's "Best Public Affairs Program" & "Best Public Affairs Program Host" (Boy Abunda)
- 2017 UPLB Gandingan Awards "Most Development-Oriented Talk show" & "Best Talk show Host" (Boy Abunda)
- 2017 LPU Batangas Golden Laurel Media Awards "Best Public Affairs Program"
- 2017 PMPC Star Awards for Television's "Best Public Affairs Program" & "Best Public Affairs Program Host" (Boy Abunda)
- 2018 PMPC Star Awards for Television's "Best Public Affairs Program" & "Best Public Affairs Program Host" (Boy Abunda)
- 2019 KBP Golden Dove Awards "Best TV Magazine Program" & "Best TV Magazine Program Host" (Boy Abunda)
- 2019 Aral Parangal Awards (Best Public Affairs Program)
- 2019 COMGUILD Media Awards "Best Entertainment News Program" & "Best Entertainment News Program Host" (Boy Abunda)
- 2019 PMPC Star Awards for Television's "Best Public Affairs Program" & "Best Public Affairs Program Host" (Boy Abunda)
- 2019 ALTA Media Awards "Best News Talk Program" & "Best News Talk Program Host" (Boy Abunda)
- 2019 Biliran Province State University Media Awards "Best Entertainment News Show" & "Best Entertainment Show Host" (Boy Abunda)
- 2020 Gawad Lasallaneta Awards "Most Outstanding Current Affairs Talk Show" & "Most Outstanding Current Affairs Talk Show Host" (Boy Abunda)

== See also ==
- List of programs broadcast by ABS-CBN
