= 2021–2022 Luzon sabungero disappearances =

Disappearance of a number of Filipino cockfighting enthusiasts

- Part of extrajudicial killings and forced disappearances in the Philippines
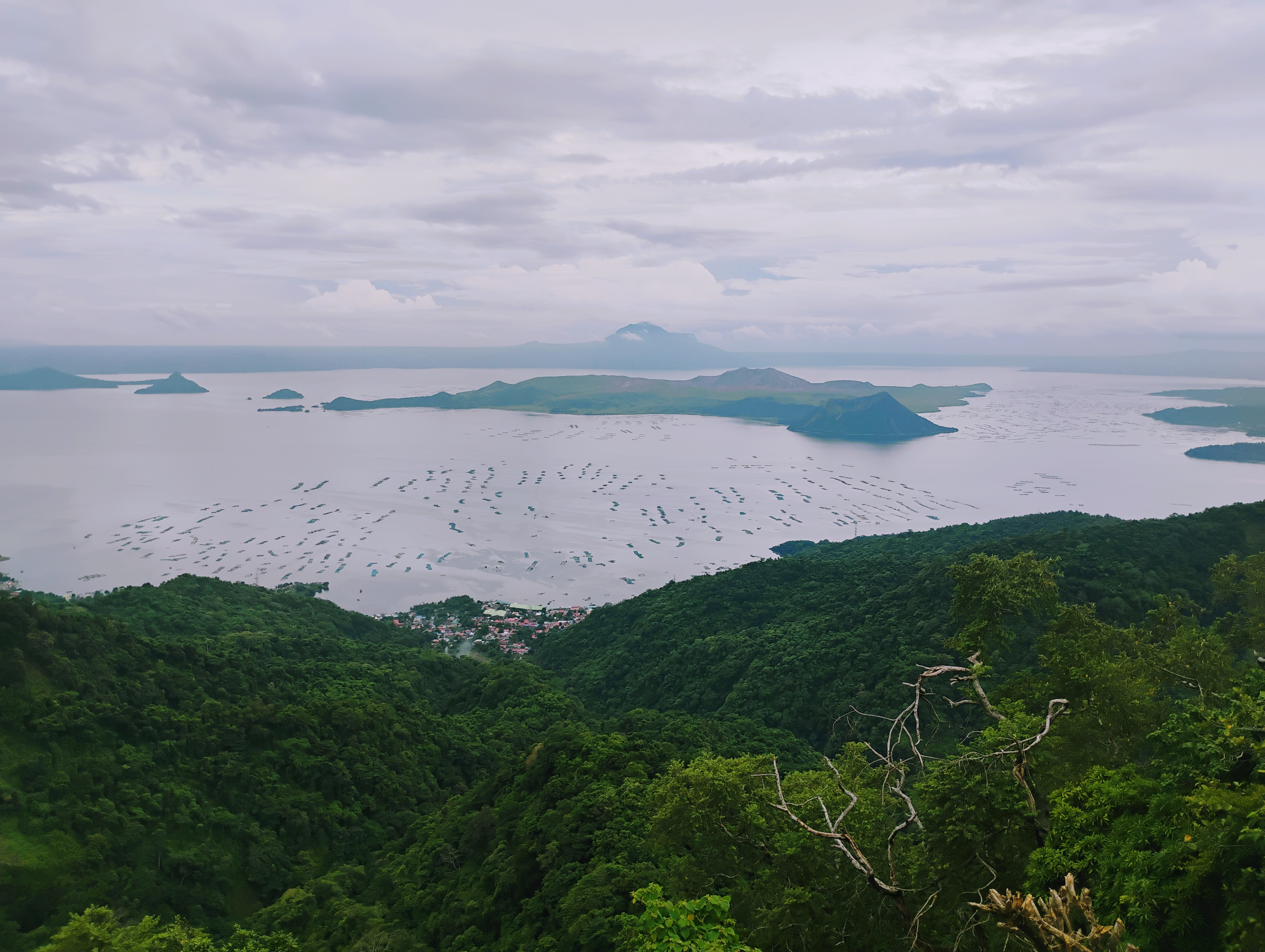
- Taal Lake in Batangas, where the missing sabungeros were allegedly disposed of
- Location: Laguna, Batangas, Bulacan, Manila, and Rizal, Philippines
- Date: April 28, 2021 – January 13, 2022; 4 years ago
- Target: Sabungeros (cockfighting enthusiasts)
- Attack type: Mass kidnapping; mass murder (alleged); home invasion; enforced disappearance
- Deaths: 100+ (alleged)
- Victim: 34 (known victims)
- Perpetrator: Unknown
- Motive: Unknown; possibly dishonesty of sabungeros at cockfighting tournaments

Between April 2021 and January 2022, at least 34 cockfighting enthusiasts, or sabungeros (sing. sabungero from Filipino sabong, meaning "cockfight"), went missing from various areas of Luzon, Philippines. Most of the disappearances occurred in Laguna, where 19 of the missing were from, but other cases were also reported in Batangas, Bulacan, Manila, and Rizal. At least one sabungero was confirmed to have been kidnapped. The victims have been referred to by the media as the missing sabungeros, sparking national media attention.

Almost nothing was known about the disappearances until June 2025, when a suspect came forward to authorities, claiming that the individuals may have been killed and disposed of in Taal Lake. The suspect further alleged that nearly 100 people were killed—far more than the 34 initially reported. The suspect also implicated businessman Atong Ang and former actress Gretchen Barretto in the abductions of the sabungeros, though both denied any involvement in the case. The Department of Justice (DOJ) and the Philippine National Police (PNP) announced that they would review and investigate the allegations as part of their ongoing investigation.

== Disappearances ==
The first documented disappearance was on April 28, 2021, when two men were seen escorting Prince in handcuffs in Santa Cruz, Laguna. A cellphone video recorded on May 11, 2021, showed two more sabungeros in Santa Cruz before their disappearances.

On August 30, 2021, a group of men stormed the house of 48-year-old Ricardo Lasco in San Pablo, Laguna. Several minutes later, Lasco was escorted out of the house with a box reportedly containing jewelry, watches, and money; he has not been seen since. According to his relatives, Lasco was a chicken breeder and a "master agent" of online cockfighting, known locally as e-sabong. Lasco's brother said that the armed men who stormed Lasco's house identified themselves as NBI agents and presented an arrest warrant, charging Lasco with "large-scale estafa". At least two police officers were implicated, but both denied their involvement. According to San Pablo chief of police Gary Alegre, the NBI did not conduct an operation that day. Senator Ronald dela Rosa suggested that e-sabong "website cloning" or spoofing might have led to Lasco's disappearance.

On January 5, 2022, brothers Jeffrey and Nomer Depano of Hagonoy, Bulacan, failed to return home after a cockfight event in Lipa, Batangas. Their van was found abandoned two days later, near a bridge along the MacArthur Highway, with their clothes inside. According to their parents, Jeffrey was brought by Nomer due to a lack of players at the event and had no previous experience in cockfighting. The day after the Depano brothers' disappearance, three more sabungeros from Hagonoy—Edgar Malaca, Alexander Quijano, and Atong Sacdalan—were reported missing after telling their families that they were going to Lipa for an e-sabong event.

On January 13, 2022, four cockfighting players went missing from the Manila Arena in Santa Ana, Manila; six more players from the same area followed. CCTV footage from that day showed a convoy of vehicles driving away from the arena, including a Toyota Tamaraw FX driven by the neighbors of a cockfight player who went missing in Rizal. The FX stopped on Osmeña Highway, where an unknown man was seen getting out of the car and into the tailing car. A day after the disappearances of some of the cockfight players in Laguna, an unidentified man was captured on CCTV withdrawing money using an ATM card belonging to one of the sabungeros. The victim's wife said that over ₱29,000 was stolen from her husband's bank account. A concerned person offered a reward of ₱250,000 for anyone who could provide the man's identity.

The disappearances were first reported by local news outlets on January 18, 2022. Three weeks later, on February 4, 2022, a luxury car used to transport cockfight enthusiasts was found abandoned at a restaurant in Malate, Manila, with its engine running. Police investigators looked into the incident as a possible kidnapping but could not find any evidence.

== Investigations ==
=== 2022 investigations ===
On February 8, 2022, the PNP said they had identified a number of persons of interest in connection to the missing cockfight enthusiasts. The police said that investigators talked to the cockfight arena managers and security guards and were eyeing match fixing and double-crossing as potential causes of the disappearances.

On February 17, Department of Justice (DOJ) Secretary Menardo Guevarra ordered the National Bureau of Investigation (NBI) to investigate the disappearance of over 20 sabungeros. The Philippine Senate Committee on Public Order and Dangerous Drugs, chaired by Senator Ronald dela Rosa, filed Senate Resolution No. 996 on February 28; the resolution urged the Philippine Amusement and Gaming Corporation (PAGCOR) to suspend the operation of e-sabong.

On February 25, Facebook posts appeared online showing pictures of dead bodies, claiming that they were those of missing cockfight enthusiasts that were found in Tanay, Rizal or in Bulacan. Police debunked the claim, however, proving that the photos were taken on February 12 during a police investigation of a shootout in Guindulungan, Maguindanao (present-day Maguindanao del Sur). They condemned the post as misinformation attempting to derail their investigation.

On March 16, police identified eight people involved in the disappearances. Five days later, witnesses implicated businessman Atong Ang in the disappearances of the cockfight players; Ang denied the allegations.

On October 8, authorities said that they traced the location of cellphones belonging to two of the missing people through their IMEI number; police did not publicize the location. The CIDG released composite sketches of the two men. The following day, the family of one missing man filed complaints of kidnapping and illegal detention against a farm manager and a security officer.

The DOJ announced on December 19 the indictment of three police officers in connection with the robbery and kidnapping of Richard Lasco on August 30, 2021. On February 13, 2023, police released photos of six Manila Arena security guards allegedly involved in the disappearances. DOJ Secretary Jesus Crispin Remulla offered a ₱6 million reward to anyone who could provide information about the suspects.

=== 2025 revelations ===
In June 2025, through an interview with Emil Sumangil of GMA News, one of the suspects under the alias "Totoy" expressed his willingness to testify in court, stating that he wished to come forward due to threats to his life and his family, as well as a desire to admit to his past wrongdoings. Totoy informed the families of the missing sabungeros that they may have already been killed and buried in Taal Lake. He alleged that individuals caught cheating in cockfights were rounded up and turned over to another group, which he declined to identify. The victims were then restrained using plastic ties and transported in a van before being strangled to death using tie wires, in what Totoy described as being "killed softly". Totoy also claimed that the number of those killed was significantly higher than initially reported, alleging that nearly 100 cockfighting workers were killed rather than just the 34 known victims.

In an interview, Remulla stated that the claim may be credible and would be reviewed as part of the ongoing case buildup. Meanwhile, the PNP expressed its willingness to investigate the claim that the remains of the missing sabungeros were buried in Taal Lake. On June 20, the Philippine Navy expressed its willingness to assist in searching for the remains in the lake. That same day, the Philippine Coast Guard (PCG) announced that it has mobilized its technical divers for a possible search and retrieval operation in the lake in coordination with the DOJ, NBI, and the Philippine Navy.

Totoy also revealed on June 20 that he had paid a group to abduct Lasco for pirating online cockfight broadcasts, though he refused to name either the group he hired or the person who ordered him to carry out the kidnapping. Totoy stated that he initially paid the group ₱2 million, but was told that the amount was insufficient because many individuals were involved in the operation. He also spoke with Lasco's family over the phone. When they asked about Lasco's whereabouts, Totoy responded that, like the other missing sabungeros, Lasco was already dead. He also presented a video allegedly depicting Lasco with his face concealed, which he said was sent by one of the leaders of the group. Lasco's family positively identified him as the person in the video and called for the authorities to protect Totoy, as well as secure the alleged dumping site of the bodies in Taal Lake.

On June 23, Remulla announced that corroborative evidence had been discovered that could support Totoy’s statements; however, he did not disclose the nature of the evidence. Remulla also stated that he had coordinated with the PNP to arrange witness protection for Totoy. The following day, Totoy claimed that around 30 individuals were involved, 20 of which are police officers, and stated that he would name them in his affidavit. One of the police officers allegedly involved in the case owns a fish farm in Talisay, Batangas, where the missing sabungeros were allegedly buried. Following this revelation, the National Police Commission (NAPOLCOM) ordered for an investigation into the alleged involvement of some police officers in the case. On June 26, Totoy revealed that a female celebrity was among the key members involved in the case, and that she was present during meetings and has more knowledge about the case. The identity of the celebrity was later revealed to be Gretchen Barretto, which she denied her involvement.

On July 3, Remulla announced that Barretto and Ang are considered suspects in the case following the revelations. The following day, he confirmed that 15 police officers were involved and that they were placed under restricted duty pending investigation. On July 10, the PCG began conducting technical dives and site assessments at the fish farm. During the operation, authorities recovered a sack containing what were described as possible bones. It had not yet been confirmed whether the remains were human, as the sack was turned over to the regional Scene of the Crime Operatives (SOCO) for forensic examination. More sacks were found underwater the following day. Three bodies were also recovered from a cemetery in Laurel, Batangas, but were not found to be that of the missing sabungeros.

=== 2026 arrests ===
On January 13, 2026, a court in Santa Cruz, Laguna, issued arrest warrants for Atong Ang and several other individuals on charges of kidnapping and homicide over the disappearances. Seventeen individuals, including ten police officers, were arrested in the subsequent manhunt operation, while Ang remains at large. The Department of the Interior and Local Government (DILG) offered a ₱10 million (US$203,045.69) reward for information leading to Ang's arrest, which was subsequently increased to ₱20 million (US$406,091.37).

On May 11, 2026, the DILG announced that the International Criminal Police Organization (Interpol) had issued a Red Notice against Atong Ang.

== Reactions ==
The families of 18 sabungeros held a protest on Mendiola Street in Manila on January 31, 2022, calling for the government to speed up the investigation. On February 12, Senator Leila de Lima expressed concern about the missing cockfighters and criticized the "seemingly slow pace of [the] investigation". Three days later, the families held a prayer vigil at the Commission on Human Rights headquarters in Quezon City.

On March 17, President Rodrigo Duterte raised the possibility that the missing 36 sabungeros were dead. Dela Rosa also said that the missing sabungeros were presumed dead due to the lack of recovered remains. Duterte rejected an earlier appeal by the Senate to suspend e-sabong operations, saying that it would cost the Philippine government about ₱640 million (US$12.15 million) per month in revenue, adding up to billions of pesos annually. He noted that the disappearances of the sabungeros were not the fault of the e-sabong management but of bad actors involved in e-sabong events. On May 4, Duterte ordered the termination of e-sabong operations due to the social cost of the gambling activity.

== In popular culture ==
An investigative documentary film titled Lost Sabungeros from GMA Public Affairs and GMA Pictures was supposed to premiere on at the 2024 Cinemalaya Philippine Independent Film Festival. However, this showing was cancelled due to unspecified "security concerns", with its premiere held instead at the QCinema International Film Festival in November 2024.

== See also ==
- Disappearance of Catherine Camilon
- List of kidnappings
- List of people who disappeared mysteriously (2000–present)
- Enforced disappearance
  - Extrajudicial killings and forced disappearances in the Philippines § Desaparecidos
