= Gikan sa Masa, para sa Masa =

Philippine television program

- Presented by: Rodrigo Duterte; Geraldine Tiu; Rocky Ignacio; Apollo Quiboloy
- Country of origin: Philippines

Production
- Camera setup: Multi-camera setup
- Running time: 60 minutes
- Production company: Radio-Television Malacañang

Original release
- Network: ABS-CBN Davao (2001–2015); People's Television Network (2017); Sonshine Media Network International (2023)
- Release: 2001

Related
- Du30 on Duty

Gikan sa Masa, para sa Masa (transl. From the Masses, for the Masses; formerly titled Mula sa Masa, para sa Masa) was a weekly public service and talk television program hosted by former Philippine president Rodrigo Duterte together with Geraldine Tiu from ABS-CBN Davao, Rocky Ignacio from the People's Television Network, and Apollo Quiboloy on SMNI. The program tackles the week's most prominent issues as well as explains the policies and showcases the projects of the Duterte administration. The show features a question-and-answer portion during which Duterte himself responds to comments, complaints and questions sent in by viewers.

The program premiered on May 19, 2017, and is supposed to air every Friday at 7:00 p.m. (UTC +08) on the government-owned People's Television Network. In the pilot and so far only episode of the program, Duterte discussed the appointment of Roy Cimatu as the new Department of Environment and Natural Resources (DENR) secretary, replacing Gina Lopez.

The program is supposed to be a spin-off of the long-running television program "Gikan sa Masa, para sa Masa", a weekly talk show that aired every Sunday morning over ABS-CBN Davao (with simulcast on DXAB 1296) when Duterte was still the mayor of Davao City and until the start of his presidential campaign. In January 2023, it began airing on SMNI, and reverting to its original title.

In August 2016, a state-owned free tabloid newspaper, named after the program's title, was introduced to the public.

== Temporary suspension ==
On December 18, 2023, Gikan sa Masa was suspended for two weeks by the Movie and Television Review and Classification Board (MTRCB) due to Duterte's death threats against Alliance of Concerned Teachers Rep. France Castro in two separate episodes: October 10 and November 15, despite an initial warning already being issued by the MTRCB on November 8.

== See also ==
- People's Television Network
