= Disappearance of Catherine Camilon =

Filipina model, went missing in 2023

Catherine Camilon
- Born: Catherine Manguerra Camilon; January 4, 1997; Tuy, Batangas, Philippines
- Disappeared: October 12, 2023 (aged 26); Lemery, Batangas, Philippines
- Status: Missing for 3 years and 29 days
- Height: 5 ft 6 in (1.68 m)
- Beauty pageant titleholder
- Title: Miss FIT Philippines 2023; Miss Grand Tuy 2023
- Hair color: Black
- Eye color: Black
- Major competitions: Miss Grand Philippines 2023; (Unplaced)

Catherine Manguerra Camilon (born January 4, 1997) is a Filipino model, schoolteacher, and beauty pageant titleholder.

Camilon went missing while driving her car from her hometown Tuy to Batangas City for a meeting. She was last seen on October 12, 2023 at XentroMall Lemery in Lemery, Batangas. She also phoned her mother to inform her that she was already at a gasoline station in Bauan.

Police are treating her disappearance as a kidnapping, as witnesses have reported her bloody, unconscious body being removed from her car and transferred to another vehicle.

The Philippine Senate Committee on Public Order and Dangerous Drugs per Senator Raffy Tulfo issued a subpoena ad testificandum to main suspect Police Major Allan de Castro and his driver-bodyguard Jefrrey Magpantay who were accused of kidnapping and illegal detention. De Castro was dismissed from service on January 16, 2024. In March 2024, De Castro retracted a 2023 admission that he had been having an affair with Camilon, and was cited for contempt and detained for some days by the Philippine Senate for allegedly lying during hearings.

However, on April 23, 2024, the regional prosecutor "dismissed charges of kidnapping and serious illegal detention filed against former Police Major Allan de Castro and his driver-bodyguard Jeffrey Magpantay," reportedly "due to lack of evidence." In May, the Philippine National Police-Criminal Investigation and Detection Group (CIDG) appealed the dismissal of the charges against the two, stating "We will exhaust all legal remedies to indict all who caused the disappearance of the beauty queen."

On September 18, 2024, de Castro and Magpantay were arrested in Balayan, Batangas.

On July 15, 2025, Camilon's unsolved disappearance became the subject of the premiere episode of Philippines' Most Shocking Stories.

In August 2025, Camilon's friend-who is the last person she spoke to before vanishing and who is also allegedly aware of the missing woman's affair with de Castro-backed out as a witness over security concerns. The PNP had assured to protect Camilon's friend and convince them to help close the case.

== See also ==
- 2021–2022 Luzon sabungero disappearances
- List of kidnappings
- List of people who disappeared mysteriously (2000–present)
