= Show & Tell (talk show) =

Philippine television talk show

- Title card
- Genre: Late-night talk show
- Presented by: Boy Abunda; Gretchen Barretto; Ai-Ai delas Alas
- Country of origin: Philippines
- Original language: Tagalog

Production
- Camera setup: Multiple-camera setup
- Running time: 60 minutes
- Production company: GMA Entertainment TV

Original release
- Network: GMA Rainbow Satellite Network
- Release: July 16, 1994 – October 1, 1995

Show & Tell is a Philippine television showbiz-oriented talk show broadcast by GMA Rainbow Satellite Network. Hosted by Boy Abunda, Gretchen Barretto, Ai-Ai delas Alas and Lolit Solis, it premiered on July 16, 1994. The show concluded on October 1, 1995.

== Hosts ==
Hosts

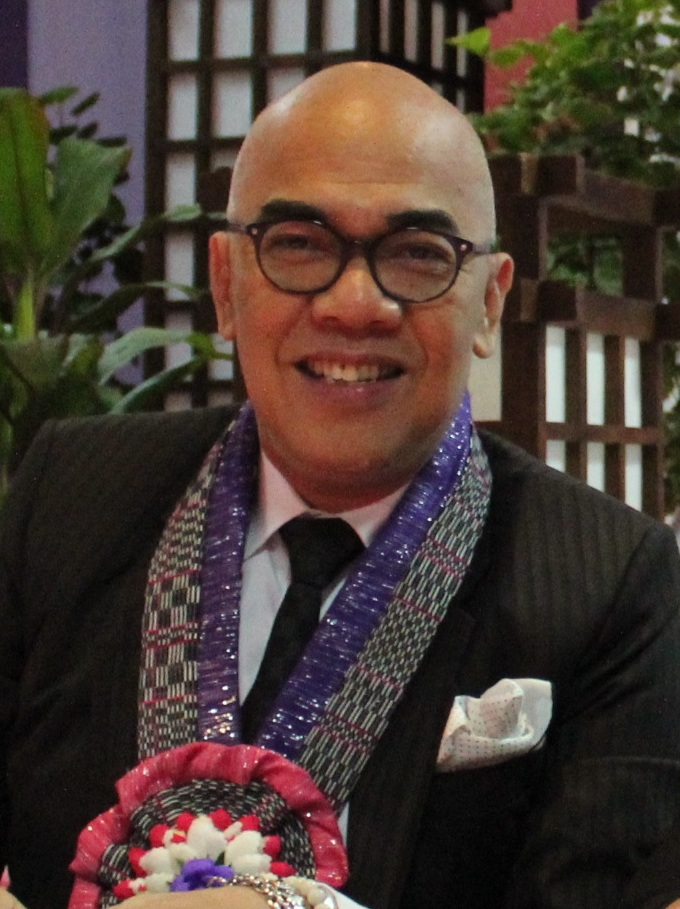
Boy Abunda

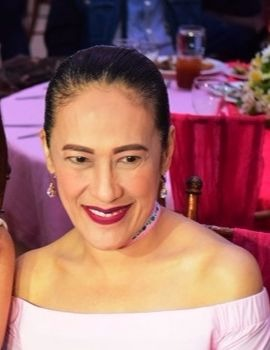
Ai-Ai delas Alas

- Boy Abunda
- Gretchen Barretto
- Ai-Ai delas Alas
