= The Trial (2014 film) =

2014 family drama film by Chito S. Roño

- Official movie poster
- Directed by: Chito S. Roño
- Screenplay by: Enrico C. Santos; Kriz G. Gazmen
- Story by: Ricky Lee
- Produced by: Charo Santos-Concio; Malou N. Santos
- Starring: John Lloyd Cruz; Richard Gomez; Gretchen Barretto; Jessy Mendiola; Enrique Gil
- Cinematography: Manuel Teehankee
- Edited by: Carlo Francisco Manatad
- Music by: Cesar Francis Concio
- Production company: Star Cinema
- Distributed by: ABS-CBN Film Productions
- Release date: October 15, 2014
- Running time: 128 minutes
- Country: Philippines
- Language: Filipino
- Box office: ₱55,961,544.00

The Trial is a 2014 Philippine family drama film directed by Chito S. Roño and written by Enrico C. Santos and Kriz G. Gazmen from a story developed by Ricky Lee. The film stars John Lloyd Cruz, Richard Gomez, Gretchen Barretto, Enrique Gil and Jessy Mendiola.

Produced and distributed by Star Cinema for its 20th anniversary, the film was theatrically released on October 15, 2014.

== Premise ==
Ronald (John Lloyd Cruz), a mentally challenged man, was put on trial after allegedly raping his teacher Bessy (Jessy Mendiola). As Amanda (Gretchen Barretto), Julian (Richard Gomez), and Ronald try to mount a convincing defense, they soon discover that they're all connected in more ways than just the case.

== Cast ==
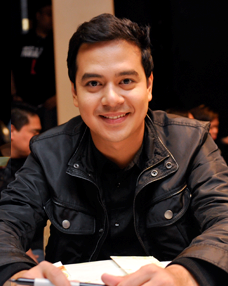
John Lloyd Cruz portrays Ronald Jimenez Jr.

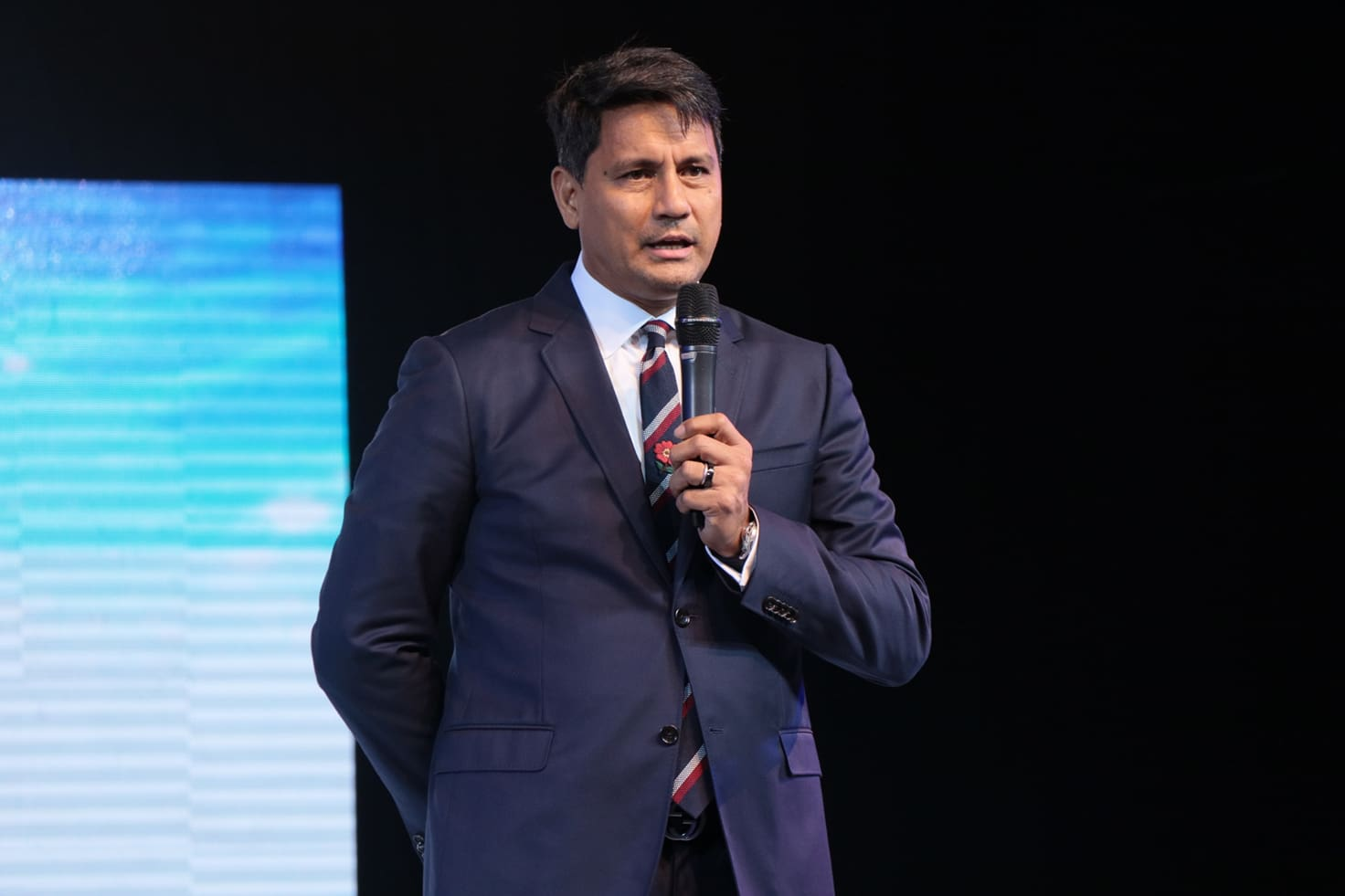
Richard Gomez portrays Julian Bien

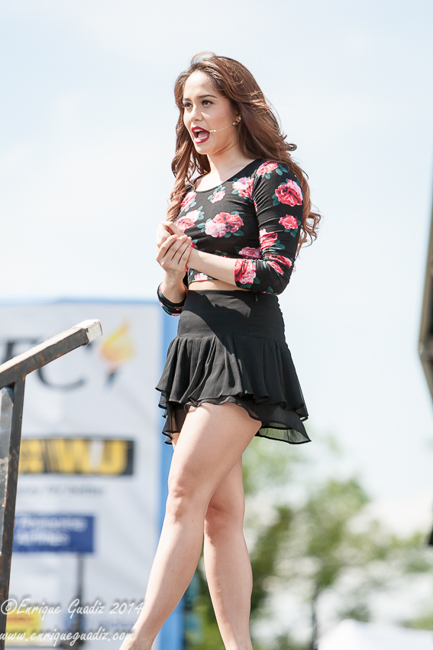
Jessy Mendiola portrays Bessy Buenaventura

- John Lloyd Cruz as Ronald Jimenez Jr.
- Gretchen Barretto as Amanda Bien
- Richard Gomez as Julian Bien
- Jessy Mendiola as Bessy Buenaventura
- Enrique Gil as Martin Bien
- Sylvia Sanchez as Sampi Jimenez
- Vincent De Jesus as Ronald Jimenez Sr.
- Vivian Velez as Lallie Lapiral
- Benjamin Alves as Paco Sequia
- Maricar Reyes as Pia
- Alonzo Muhlach as Junjun
- Isay Alvarez as Atty. Patricia Celis
- Joy Viado† as Dora
- Mon Confiado as Borta
- Nico Antonio as Paco's friend
- Manuel Chua as Sheriff
- Gee Canlas as Megan
- Lui Manansala as Mrs. Deputado
- Angie Ferro† as Judge Feliciana Nieves
