= Atong Ang =

Filipino businessman (born 1957)

- Born: Charlie Tiu Hay Sy Ang; August 29, 1957 (age 69)
- Occupation: Businessman
- Spouse: Iris Ang
- Children: 3
- Criminal information
- Conviction: Plunder
- Criminal charges: Homicide, Kidnapping
- Reward amount: ₱20 million (US$406,091.37)
- Capture status: Fugitive
- Wanted by: Department of the Interior and Local Government (DILG)
- Wanted since: January 13, 2026

Charlie Tiu Hay Sy Ang (born August 29, 1957), commonly referred to as Atong Ang, is a Filipino fugitive, businessman, gambling magnate known for his involvement in the jueteng and cockfighting industries. He gained national attention in 2000 when he became a co-accused in the impeachment trial of President Joseph Estrada, and was issued an arrest warrant in April 2001 for plunder. Although he had fled from the Philippines during EDSA II, he was arrested by the FBI in the United States on November 25, 2001 upon an extradition request by the Philippine government, being detained for five years before his extradition to the Philippines in November 2006. After pleading guilty of indirect bribery in 2007, Ang served two years in prison before being released in May 2009.

In 2025, Ang was accused by a former security aide of perpetrating the disappearance of more than 100 cockfighting enthusiasts from 2021 to 2022, although he has denied the allegations. As of 2026, he is wanted on charges of kidnapping and homicide over the disappearances following the issuance of an arrest warrant against him.

== Early life ==
Charlie Tiu Hay Sy Ang, commonly known as Atong Ang, was born on August 29, 1957 His mother is Catalina Ang (born 1929). According to Catalina's former cook Delia Rajas, Atong Ang has a sister named "Allan", later alleged to have used the alias "Yolanda Uy" in attempting to erase Ang's bank records.

He is not related to Ramon Ang.

== Business career ==
In the 1990s, Ang owned a company named Power Express. By 1999, he headed Power Management and Consultancy Inc., a private firm alleged to have been established by jai alai enthusiasts. In the same year, Ang became a "consultant for marketing and promotions" for the Philippine Amusement and Gaming Corporation (PAGCOR).

Ang is the chairman of Pitmasters Live and the owner of Lucky 8 Starquest, a major online cockfighting platform. He was previously involved in the illicit numbers game known as jueteng, and later transitioned to its legalised counterpart, the Small Town Lottery, operated under the auspices of the Philippine Charity Sweepstakes Office. Ang is also recognized for co-founding the Ultimate Fighting Cock Championship (UFCC) and financing cockfighting teams.

== Legal issues and controversies ==
=== Alleged assault of Rep. Patrick Antonio ===
In late February 1996, Representative Patrick Antonio of Cagayan, a cockfighting enthusiast, accused Ang and his bodyguards of assaulting him at the Roligon Mega Cockpit in Parañaque on February 21, 1996 while he was hosting a derby. He alleged that several of them were members of the Presidential Anti-Crime Commission (PACC), chaired by Vice President Joseph Estrada, and denounced Ang for the "wanton and abusive display of naked power by someone who is associated with somebody in power." Although a hearing had begun to be held by the House Committee on Public Order and Safety, chaired by Rep. Teodulo Natividad of Bulacan's 1st district, Ang did not appear before Congress, citing his alleged loose bowel movement, gas pains and nausea based on a provided medical certificate.

In the years after, Antonio and Ang continued to have cockfighting matches with each other. In 2022, Ang cited Antonio to be among the major licensees of online cockfighting ("e-sabong") who are in his circle of friends.

=== Casino Filipino videotape and the disappearance of Egay Bentain ===
Ang is a close associate of former president Joseph Estrada, and the two, along with Dharm "Danny" Devnani (who can be seen coaching Estrada), and casino manager and PAGCOR chief Reynaldo Butch Tenorio have been caught on a leaked videotape playing high-stakes baccarat at the Casino Filipino Silahis branch at the Grand Boulevard Hotel along Roxas Boulevard in Manila during September 15, 1996. The video tape was leaked by Casino Filipino CCTV operator and technician Edgardo "Egay" Bentain to the press two months before the 1998 presidential election, in which Estrada won the presidency. Bentain mysteriously disappeared during January 16, 1999 shortly after stepping out of the Casino Filipino Roxas Blvd. branch. As per a Ferdinand Marcos Sr. presidential decree in 1983 (PD 1067-B, amended by PD 1869), government officials, members of the Philippine National Police and the Armed Forces of the Philippines are not allowed to play inside government-owned gambling casinos, which include PAGCOR-owned Casino Filipino casinos. Only foreign tourists and local residents with a net annual income of P50,000 are allowed to stay and play in the casinos.

In an affidavit in August 2001, Devnani, one of Ang's gambling associates, had linked Ang to Bentain's disappearance. According to Devnani, Ang knew who leaked the video tape and provided a cryptic warning ("Alam ko 'yan. Kami na bahala. Malapit na") which Devnani didn't pay any mind until Devnani saw news headlines on newspapers that Bentain had disappeared.

Angelo Mawanay, alias "Ador", alleged that Panfilo Lacson ordered Bentain to be abducted and buried alive by the Presidential Anti-Organized Crime Task force and volunteered information to the press on Lacson’s alleged secret deposits in America. Lacson alleges that military intelligence chief Col. Victor Corpus is using Mawanay as part of then nascent president Gloria Macapagal Arroyo's government campaign to bring Lacson down. Corpus, after initially apologizing to Lacson after Corpus has been kicked out of the Intelligence Services of the Armed Forces of the Philippines (ISAFP) for conning witnesses, apologized again to Lacson in April 2017, stating that his information was "devious and a fraud". Lacson accepted Corpus' apology, which he said was "long in coming.".

Lacson mentioned Bentain's disappearance in his second privilege speech against Estrada in September 22, 2009. In it, he recalls that Bentain was killed "somewhere in Laguna", and that a former police officer ent to Polk St. in Greenhills and reported compliance with a "mission accomplished". The house occupant simply said, "Sige, sabihin mo sa mga bata, maraming salamat." Lacson further asserts that he didn't identify the criminal because he "did not have any participation or direct personal knowledge of these criminal activities while they were taking place years ago. My investigation is ongoing even as I speak today. But I have gathered enough facts and data to provide the useful leads to unmask the mastermind's true identity and his active participation including other persons who were barely mentioned in the conduct of investigation.".

Before the speech, Ediver Bentain, Edgar's youngest brother, hoped that the speech would reveal who was the "mastermind" of the disappearance of his brother. His family does not want anyone in the family to grant any interview regarding the incident, so as for fear of disappearance. He says that his mother wished to see Edgar's ashes, and noted that the Dacer family were lucky because they had seen Salvador Dacer's remains. Ediver has long suspected that Estrada was involved with Edgar's disappearance and that Lacson could be involved. After the speech, Edcel Bentain, one of Edgar's brothers, expressed disappointment regarding the Lacson speech, as they felt that they were using Edgar as political "leverage", and hoped for actual evidence to appear so that they can take it to court.

=== Impeachment trial of Joseph Estrada ===
On October 4, 2000, Ilocos Sur Governor Luis "Chavit" Singson and jueteng lord, a longtime friend of Estrada, went public with accusations that Estrada and his friends and family had received millions of pesos from operations of jueteng: an illegal numbers game played by selecting two numbers ranging from 1 to 37, which bettors can play for as low as one peso. Ang triggered the rift between Estrada and Singson. Estrada allegedly gave Ang the green light to operate jueteng, which threatened to put Singson out of his illegal business.

According to Singson, Estrada received ₱220 million in jueteng protection money since taking over the presidency.

Singson also testified that Ang managed a gambling consultancy firm owned by Estrada named Prominent Management and Consultancy, which was awarded the exclusive contract to operate Bingo 2-Ball nationwide "pending review of the system and operating procedures" for PAGCOR which, according to Singson, earned at least ₱500,000 (equivalent to ₱1,092,959 in 2021) per night. Bingo 2-Ball was stopped after it was revealed that 23 percent of the profits have been directly transferred into Ang's bank account, and that all Bingo 2-Ball operators were former illegal jueteng operators. Singson, then Ilocos Sur governor, former Estrada sympathizer and one of the major figures behind Estrada's impeachment, said: "Bingo 2-Ball was not designed to kill jueteng but to systematize the payoffs, with the president and Atong Ang getting 23 percent of the action, much bigger than what Erap (Estrada) is getting from jueteng."

Ang was a co-accused in the 2001 corruption trial of Estrada at the Sandiganbayan, linked to a ₱4-billion plunder case and ₱130-million diversion for tobacco excise taxes. On the morning of January 20, 2001, at the height of EDSA II, he fled the Philippines on a Cathay Pacific flight to Hong Kong, and then took a flight to the United States, where he sought asylum. On April 25, 2001, the Sandiganbayan issued an arrest warrant for Ang on charges of plunder alongside Estrada, his son Jinggoy and his business associate Yolanda Ricaforte among others, with Ang later arrested by the FBI at the Paris Las Vegas casino hotel along the Las Vegas Strip in Paradise, Nevada, on the basis of an extradition request in the early hours of November 25, 2001. Ang tried to apply for bail, but the Las Vegas court denied this request on March 1, 2002, instead opting for an extradition. He was later extradited back to the Philippines on November 10, 2006, and with Ruth Castelo as his lawyer, Ang entered a plea bargain with the government in 2007 by admitting guilt to "corruption of public officials in relation to indirect bribery". He was sentenced to two years probation; although he later requested that he be allowed to serve as a lottery consultant in Phnom Penh, Cambodia, the Sandiganbayan denied his request in December 2007. He served his sentence in a Quezon City prison until his release in late May 2009. According to newspaper columnist Ramon Tulfo, Ang returned to illegal gambling by June 2009, operating jai-alai and small-town lottery games in the Cagayan Special Economic Zone.

=== Masiao ===
As a PAGCOR contractor during Estrada's presidential tenure, Ang also distributed Pagcor IDs for bet collectors within Visayas and Mindanao. Rex "Wakee" Salud, a boxing promoter who also operates an off-fronton betting station in Cebu City, told a local radio station that Ang authorized him to distribute Pagcor IDs in Cebu City. These IDs were used to collect illegal "masiao" bets - an illegal numbers game based on outcomes of a jai-alai game in Manila, which is as popular in Visayas and Mindanao as jueteng is in Luzon.

Then Executive Secretary Ronaldo Zamora said that the police should arrest all bet collectors in Visayas and Mindanao with Pagcor IDs. Estrada ordered to rescind Ang's consultancy contract on October 8, 2000.

=== Involvement over small-town lotteries ===
In December 2017, then-PCSO general manager Alexander Balutan alleged that Ang offered PCSO to provide ₱200 million per month to PCSO if he was allowed to control small-town lotteries nationwide. He rejected as PCSO was generating a monthly revenue of ₱1.7 billion from STLs. Ang denied the allegations. Ang said that the meeting where he provided Then-PCSO Chairperson Jose Jorge Corpuz the offer was intended in "shaking up" STLs to generate revenue for social services, and that he was told by Duterte to do so.

=== Barretto family feud ===
In October 2019, Ang found himself entangled in a widely publicized altercation within the Barretto family during the wake of Miguel Barretto, father of actress and socialite Gretchen Barretto, with whom Ang has reportedly been in a partnership since 2017. The incident, which took place in the presence of then-President Rodrigo Duterte, reportedly escalated into a confrontation between Gretchen and her sister Marjorie Barretto, prompting security personnel to intervene. The dispute quickly spilled onto social media, where Gretchen launched pointed criticisms at Marjorie and her niece, actress Julia Barretto.

=== Kidnapping accusations ===
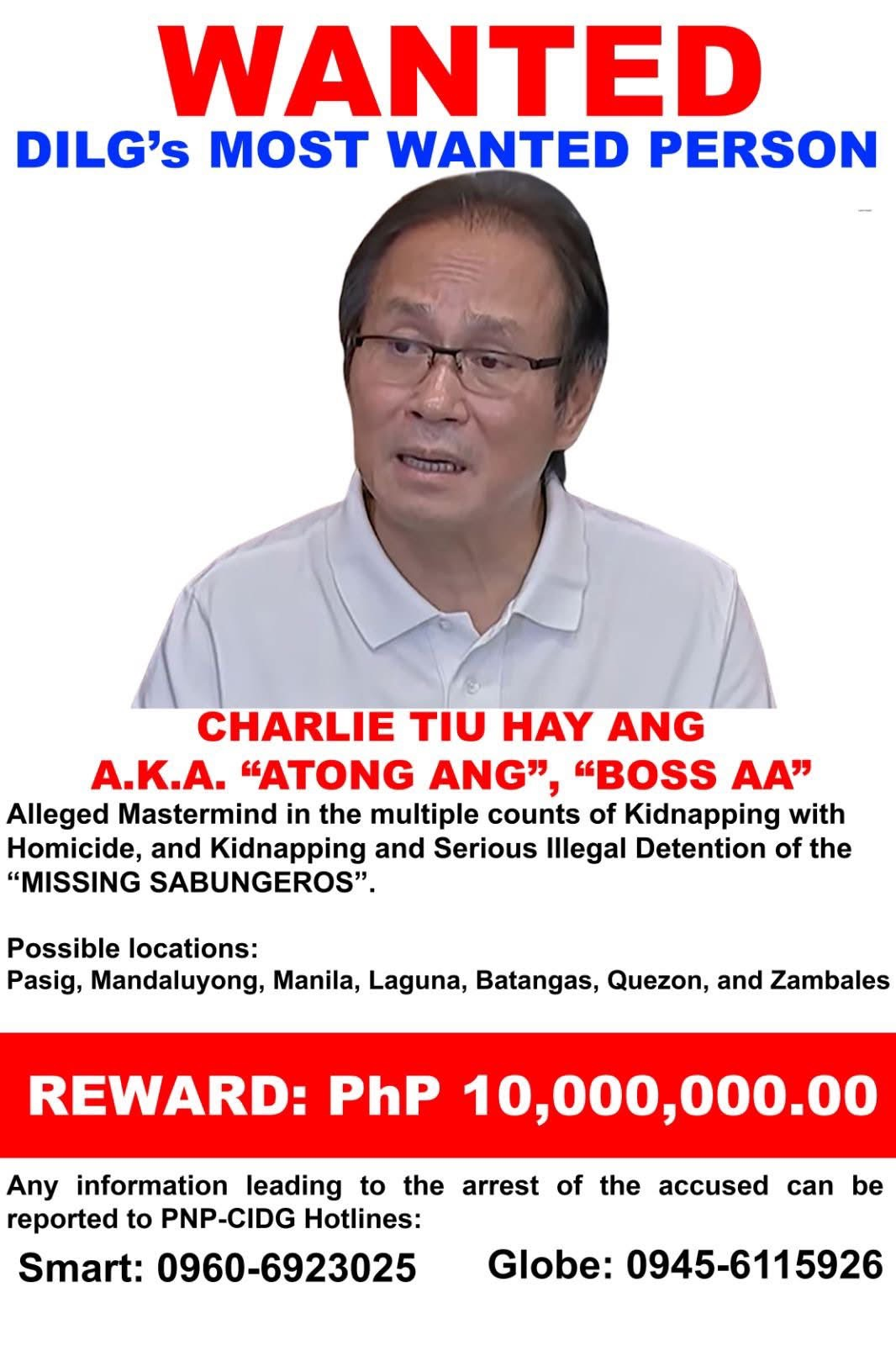
Ang's official wanted poster by the Philippine National Police

In 2025, Ang was implicated by whistleblower Julie "Dondon" Patidongan (alias "Totoy") in the disappearance of over 100 cockfighting enthusiasts, known as sabungeros. Patidongan, who once headed Ang's security at a cockfighting arena, alleged that Ang masterminded the abductions, with supposed involvement from actress Gretchen Barretto, policemen, and other associates. Ang has denied the allegations, filing a counter-affidavit before the Mandaluyong Regional Trial Court (RTC).

On January 13, 2026, a court in Santa Cruz, Laguna, issued arrest warrants for Ang and several other individuals on charges of kidnapping and homicide over the disappearances. Seventeen individuals, including 10 police officers, were arrested in the subsequent manhunt operation, while Ang remains at large. The Department of the Interior and Local Government offered a ₱10 million (US$203,045.69) reward for information leading to Ang's arrest, which was subsequently increased to ₱20 million (US$406,091.37).

On January 16, 2026, a court in Lipa, Batangas, issued arrest warrants for Ang and 20 individuals on charges of kidnapping and homicide over the disappearances. A warrant on similar charges was issued against him in San Pablo, Laguna on February 6.

On May 11, 2026, the Department of the Interior and Local Government (DILG) announced that Red Notices from the International Criminal Police Organization (Interpol) had been issued against Ang and two other fugitives, namely Gerald Bantag and Rafael Dumlao III.

== Personal life ==
Ang is married to Iris Ang and has three children. One of his children, Elaine, is an actress. In 2007, he reportedly suffered from a kidney ailment, hypertension, pedal edema and lower back pain while being sentenced by the Sandiganbayan.

In 2024, Ang confirmed that he was in a relationship with Sunshine Cruz.
