= Fast Talk with Boy Abunda =

Philippine television talk show

- Title card since 2025
- Genre: Talk show
- Written by: Ardee Delola; Yani Bautista; Bam Salvani; Jessie Villabrille
- Directed by: Rommel Gacho
- Presented by: Boy Abunda
- Country of origin: Philippines
- Original language: Tagalog

Production
- Executive producer: Reylie Manalo
- Production locations: 17th Floor, GMA Network Center, Quezon City, Philippines
- Camera setup: Multiple-camera setup
- Running time: 17–29 minutes
- Production company: GMA Entertainment Group

Original release
- Network: GMA Network
- Release: January 23, 2023 – present

Fast Talk with Boy Abunda is a Philippine television talk show broadcast by GMA Network. Directed by Rommel Gacho, it is hosted by Boy Abunda. It premiered on January 23, 2023 on the network's Afternoon Prime line up.

The show is streaming online on YouTube.

== Premise ==
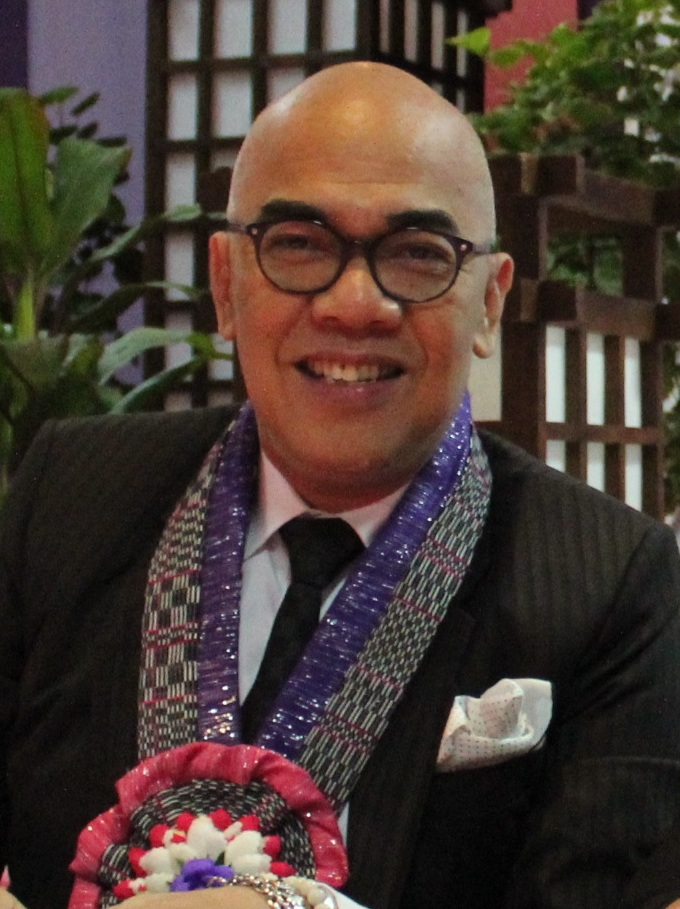
Boy Abunda serves as the host.

The talk show showcases a summary and examination of the newest happenings in the Philippine entertainment industry. Host Boy Abunda will be doing the Fast Talk segment, give his commentary on the latest headline news, with his interview with the guest serving as the central part of the show.

== Ratings ==
According to AGB Nielsen Philippines' Nationwide Urban Television Audience Measurement People in Television Homes, the pilot episode of Fast Talk with Boy Abunda earned a 7.5% rating.

== Accolades ==
Accolades received by Fast Talk with Boy Abunda
Year	Award	Category	Recipient	Result	Ref.
2023	45th Catholic Mass Media Awards	Best Talk Show Host	Fast Talk with Boy Abunda	Won	
2024	6th Gawad Lasallianeta	Most Outstanding Talk Show	Fast Talk with Boy Abunda	Won	
2024	6th Gawad Lasallianeta	Most Outstanding Talk Show Host	Boy Abunda	Won	
2024	52nd Box Office Entertainment Awards	Most Popular TV Program	Fast Talk with Boy Abunda	Won	
2025	37th PMPC Star Awards for Television	Best Celebrity Talk Show	Fast Talk with Boy Abunda	Won	
2025	37th PMPC Star Awards for Television	Best Celebrity Talk Show Host	Boy Abunda	Won	
2025	38th PMPC Star Awards for Television	Best Showbiz Oriented Talk Show	Fast Talk with Boy Abunda	Won	
