= To Live for the Masses =

- Starring: Joseph Estrada
- Distributed by: Public Perception Management Asia (Publikasia)
- Release date: 2006
- Running time: 57 minutes
- Country: Philippines
- Languages: English; Filipino

To Live for the Masses (Filipino: Ang Mabuhay para sa Masa) is a 2006 Philippine documentary film about the life of Philippine President Joseph Estrada. The documentary details Estrada's childhood and acting career, his rise to political prominence as mayor of San Juan in Metro Manila and his election as Senator, and finally his rise to the presidency and his ouster in the Second EDSA Revolution.

Originally set to be broadcast on two television networks, ABC and UNTV, the documentary was never aired publicly after it was controversially given an "X" rating by the Movie and Television Review and Classification Board (MTRCB).

== Synopsis ==
To Live for the Masses is divided into four parts, each narrating Joseph Estrada's childhood, acting career and life as a politician, with the fourth part dedicated to events leading to and surrounding the 2001 EDSA Revolution as narrated from his point of view.

== Reception ==
On August 28, 2006, the Movie and Television Review and Classification Board (MTRCB) gave To Live for the Masses an "X" rating—reduced from the original "XXX" rating given on August 22—claiming that film was libelous and served to undermine people's faith in government, which at the time was led by Estrada's successor and former vice president, Gloria Macapagal Arroyo. The rating, which prevented the documentary's "public exhibition", was controversial, with Ronald Lumbao, spokesman of the People's Movement Against Poverty (PMAP), comparing the MTRCB's decision to a similar case in 1965 involving the alleged banning by Diosdado Macapagal, Arroyo's father, of the pro-Ferdinand Marcos film Iginuhit ng Tadhana (Drawn by Destiny), released prior to the 1965 presidential election which Macapagal subsequently lost. In response to the rating, Estrada supporters picketed the MTRCB offices on August 31, 2006.

Senator Franklin Drilon, during deliberations for the board's 2007 budget, claimed that the MTRCB did not have the mandate to censor on the basis of libel, even going so far as alluding that the rating was a return to the era of martial law, when censorship was rampant. In the House of Representatives, Minority Floor Leader Francis Escudero claimed that only pornographic films received "X" ratings and that there was nothing indecent about the documentary. Estrada's lawyers subsequently appealed to Arroyo, who convened a special committee chaired by Cecilia Guidote-Alvarez, chairwoman of the National Commission for Culture and the Arts (NCCA), ultimately referring the case back to the MTRCB on November 9, 2006, and suggesting that the film may be shown only after cutting around two-thirds of its original length. An MTRCB appeals committee decided in favor of lifting the ban on the film, but against the immediate public exhibition, in January 2007.

A case was later filed by the producers of the film with the Supreme Court, who later referred the case to the Court of Appeals (CA). While the court ruled in May 2007 that the MTRCB has to explain its decision, it ultimately affirmed the MTRCB's decision on December 1, 2008. The decision was criticized by Senate Minority Leader Aquilino Pimentel Jr., who presided over Estrada's impeachment trial, saying that it violated his freedom of speech.

=== Distribution and exhibition ===
As the case was being heard by the MTRCB, the producers of To Live for the Masses nonetheless sought to show the film. Immediately after the release of the MTRCB's decision, the producers announced that they intend to show the film in Plaza Miranda owing to its status as a freedom park. Whereas the city government of Manila refused, deferring to the MTRCB's judgment. A screening of the documentary meanwhile was supposedly organized for members of the House of Representatives on October 12, 2006. However, it is not known whether the screening actually took place.

VCD and DVD copies of the film were also produced, but owing to the MTRCB's ruling, distribution using that medium didn't occur. However, Artemio Raymundo, a first lieutenant with the Philippine Marine Corps, was arrested for distributing the documentary, which he claimed he did out of his own volition after chancing on copies of the documentary while riding the LRT, and was recommended for court-martial—ostensibly on an unrelated case—in December 2006.

Estrada's official website, erap.ph, featured a link to the documentary, saved as a Windows Media Video file.
