= Dear Satan =

- Original theatrical release poster
- Directed by: RC Delos Reyes
- Starring: Paolo Contis; Sienna Stevens
- Production company: Mavx Productions
- Distributed by: Filicoola
- Release date: December 25, 2025
- Running time: 92 minutes
- Country: Philippines
- Language: Filipino

Dear Satan, later renamed Dear Santa, is a 2025 Philippine Christmas fantasy comedy film directed by RC Delos Reyes under Mavx Productions and stars Paolo Contis and Sienna Stevens. The film depicts a story of a child accidentally writing a letter to Satan rather than Santa Claus.

The film drew controversy over its title and the depiction of Satan as a redeemable character and its theatrical release was prevented by an X-rating by the Movie and Television Review and Classification Board (MTRCB). It was later released as Dear Santa in the streaming platform Filicoola in December 25, 2025.

== Premise ==
Chichi (Sienna Stevens) writes a letter to Santa Claus for Christmas but accidentally misspells Santa's name. This leads to the letter finding its way to Satan (Paolo Contis), who answers to the girl's wishes. Satan attempts to tempt Chichi to evil, but the girl's virtues resists the demon's plans and changes him instead.

== Cast ==
- Paolo Contis as Satan; he receives a letter from a little girl which was actually meant for Santa Claus but misspells "Santa" as "Satan". Satan in the film is depicted as a redeemable character who initially attempts to be a bad influence to the girl. Contis reasons that Satan was chosen to play a role in the film due to be a clear depiction of evil. However, Contis admits that the audience of the trailer noticed that Satan as being "too nice" and justified holding back from playing the character at his worst since Dear Satan is ultimately still a children's film.
- Sienna Stevens as Chichi; the girl who accidentally writes a letter to Satan. She withstands Satan's temptations due to her strong faith. She is intended as a personification of "child-like faith" which the production of the film meant to promote.
- Aya Fernandez

== Production ==
Dear Satan was produced under Mavx Productions with RC Delos Reyes as the film's director. The film was made under the workshop script of Mowelfund. The story concept was by Paolo Contis.

The film nevertheless received controversy over its initial title Dear Satan, with Mavx announcing it would change the film's name in August 2024 "to better align with its intended message and to respect the sensitivities of the audience". The production team explained that Dear Satan revolves around the concept of good versus evil, where an innocent child who "overcomes temptations through strong faith". By this time the film was already finished and "fully edited".

== Release ==
The film was scheduled to be released theatrically in the Philippines on September 18, 2024. However the Movie and Television Review and Classification Board (MTRCB) gave Dear Satan an X rating barring it from public exhibition in cinemas. Mavx Productions no longer appealed to the MTRCB. There are plans to have the film released straight-to-home media via Netflix.

The film was eventually released under a pay-per-view basis in the Filicoola platform in December 25, 2025.

== MTRCB rating ==
MTRCB chair Lala Sotto, who personally viewed the film along with the board, explaining Dear Satan's X rating said that the film was offensive to her as a Christian, particularly the depiction of Satan as redeeming himself insisting that "Satan will never ever be good".

Despite the film being renamed as Dear Santa, the MTRCB upheld its X rating, saying that the film’s positive depiction of Satan served as “an attack on fundamental belief of the Catholic and Christian faiths.”

The Directors' Guild of the Philippines said that the MTRCB had "evident overreach" insisting that the film does not glorify evil and that Dear Satan "challenges conventional depictions of antagonists, suggesting that even those considered inherently bad can change for the better".

== See also ==
- My Guardian Debil, a 1998 Filipino supernatural comedy film about a demon who finds redemption and is in fact an angel
- Dear Santa, a 2024 American film starring Jack Black with a similar plot
