= Censorship in the Philippines =

In the Philippines, censorship involves the suppression of certain information on print media, broadcast media, film, and the internet.

== Background ==
Freedom of speech and freedom of the press are enshrined in the 1987 Constitution. According to the Constitution, under Article XVI, Section 10, the State is obligated to "provide the policy environment for … the balanced flow of information into, out of, and across the country, in accordance with a policy that respects the freedom of speech and of the press." The Constitution also guarantees freedom of the press under Article III, Section 4. The Office of the President is responsible for managing the government's policy toward the press.

The Philippines is also a signatory to the United Nations International Covenant on Civil and Political Rights, which aims to protect freedom of expression and the freedom of the press.

The country launched the Philippine Plan of Action on the Safety of Journalists in 2019. The action plan aims to address the areas of integrity and professionalism, conducive working conditions, safety and protection mechanisms, criminal justice system, and public information, journalism education, and research.

Although independent observers credit the government with respecting freedom of the press in general, the government has been criticized for failing to investigate thoroughly summary killings of journalists and for subjecting journalists to harassment, red-tagging, and surveillance. In addition to killings, journalists in the Philippines have been victims of various forms of threats and attacks, including verbal assault and intimidation, physical assault, libel charges, arrests, and detentions. Journalists have also been blacklisted from covering public events. Attacks and threats may be carried out by state agents or private individuals. From July 2022 to April 2024, of these attacks, 50 were carried out by military, police, or other state agents, 28 by private individuals, and 27 by political figures.

== History ==
=== Spanish colonial period ===
Although considered widespread by various American and Filipino scholars, the level of censorship varied depending on the sitting governor general. Noted publications banned by the colonial authorities were the Noli Me Tángere and El filibusterismo novels of José Rizal, which were critical of the Spanish colonial government and the church.

From 1857 to 1883, the Spanish largely regulated the press in the Philippines through the Rules of Printing Matters (Reglamento de Asuntos de Imprenta) under which newspapers were required to obtain a license from the government. This was followed by the Printing Order or Gullón (De policía de imprenta o Gullón) in 1883 by the Liberal Spanish government at the time, which led to the emergence of multiple Philippines newspapers until the end of the Spanish colonial period.

=== American colonial period ===
The United States administration introduced laws against sedition and libel in the Philippines in 1901 through the Sedition Act and the Criminal Libel Act. This led to the closure of El Renacimiento, which openly advocated for Philippine independence, advocated the usage of Spanish as an official language, and was critical of Governor General William Howard Taft's policies in 1908.

The Board of Censorship for Moving Pictures (BCMP) was formed on November 27, 1929, through Commonwealth Act No. 3852. By 1930, the first board of the BCMP reviewed 1,249 films for public exhibition, six of which were allowed only with cuts, and two were banned. The BCMP became the Board of Review for Moving Pictures (BRMP) in 1936.

=== World War II ===
During the Japanese occupation of the Philippines during World War II, the Japanese banned all publications not for the Japanese audience, save for Manila Tribune, Taliba, and La Vanguardia. Publications by these local newspapers were heavily censored by the Imperial Japanese Army. However, underground publications were accessible to Filipinos during this period, which allowed the distribution of information not censored by the Japanese.

=== Post-Commonwealth period ===
Post-war state censorship of print media is limited, as the press functioned as a watchdog of the government. During this period, the Philippine press is known to be the "freest in Asia". The Board of Review for Moving Pictures (BRMP) regulated cinema from the end of the war until 1961. The BRMP was reorganized as the Board of Censors of Motion Pictures (BCMP) during the administration of President Carlos P. Garcia. BCMP was constituted through Republic Act No. 3060 on June 17, 1961, and was placed under the Office of the President.

=== Martial law period ===
As part of the imposition of martial law during the administration of President Ferdinand Marcos in 1972 until the 1980s, the press was heavily regulated and censored. All publications including from foreign news outfits had to be approved by the Department of Public Information. Society news, editorial commentary, and content critical to the Philippine government were among those banned. The government seized control of privately owned print and broadcast media outfits. Only Daily Express and Bulletin Today (Manila Bulletin) were allowed to resume operations among those publications that existed prior to martial law. These newspapers, along with the Times Journal, were owned by Marcos cronies and came to be known as the "crony press" and served as mouthpieces for the dictatorship. Books such as Primitivo Mijares' The Conjugal Dictatorship of Ferdinand and Imelda Marcos and Carmen Navarro Pedrosa's The Untold Story of Imelda Marcos were also banned.

The regulations encouraged self-censorship by the press, which were traditionally adversarial towards the government. In the 1980s, an "alternative press" unsanctioned by the government emerged. Among these publications that form part of the alternative press were Jose Burgos' WE Forum and Pahayagang Malaya; Veritas, edited by Felix Bautista and Melinda de Jesus; Raul and Leticia Locsin's Business Day (present-day Business World); Eugenia Apostol and Leticia Magsanoc's Inquirer and Mr. and Ms. Magazine. The phenomenon of samizdat or xerox journalism also proliferated, which involved the dissemination of news clippings, usually from publications abroad that were not checked by the government's censors. These often proliferated through Filipino journalists working for foreign news outfits.

Foreign journalists critical of the regime were often expelled or had their visas denied or revoked. Marcos accused Arnold Zeitlin of the Associated Press of "malicious and false reporting" during his coverage of the fighting between the government forces and Muslim Filipino separatists in Jolo, Sulu. Zeitlin was expelled from the Philippines in 1976. A year later, the government denied the visa application of Bernard Wideman, a news correspondent of The Washington Post and Far Eastern Economic Review. Wideman covered Marcos' seizure of privately owned companies such as Philippine Airlines and Philippine Cellophane Film Corporation. Wideman's expulsion was eventually reversed by the Immigration Commission.

Like print and broadcast media, film was also heavily regulated during the martial law period. Letter of Instruction no. 13 issued on September 29, 1972, prohibited films that incite subversion and rebellion, films that glorify criminals, films that show the use of prohibited drugs, and films that undermine people's confidence in the government. It also banned films that are contrary to the spirit of Proclamation 1081. President Marcos reorganized the Board of Censors of Motion Pictures as the Board of Review for Motion Pictures and Television (BRMPT) on November 13, 1981, through Executive Order No. 745. He also increased the members of the board through Executive Order 757. The Movie and Television Review and Classification Board (MTRCB) replaced BRMPT on October 5, 1985, through Presidential Decree No. 1986. It was tasked to regulate and classify media, including motion picture and television programs.

By controlling mass media, the martial law dictatorship was able to suppress negative news and create an exaggerated impression of economic progress.

=== Contemporary period (since 1986) ===
With the advent of the internet in the Philippines, there was debate regarding the necessity of censorship in the 1990s to block cyber pornography in response to reports of Filipinos being prostituted through online means. The issue reached the Senate at the time with Senators Blas Ople and Orlando S. Mercado calling for a hearing on the matter in 1995, and Senator Gregorio Honasan filing a bill as a bid to address the matter.

In 2000, the Roman Catholic Church in the Philippines through the Catholic Bishops' Conference of the Philippines (CBCP) launched cbcpNet, its own internet service provider (ISP), which filters out content depicting pornography, homosexuality, violence and devil worship, for its subscribers. This venture failed due to a CBCP partner fleeing the Philippines, which led to debt and legal issues. CBCP World was introduced in 2002, the CBCP's second attempt to set up its own ISP, which also offered filtered online access like its predecessor.

The passing of the Cybercrime Prevention Act in 2012, was a subject of concern by human rights activists especially its provisions on cyberlibel. The law was challenged and the Supreme Court ruled in 2014 that the original author of libelous content is only liable against the law saying that the act of posting libelous content is not a crime. The court also iterated that access to websites can't be restricted by the Department of Justice without a prior court order and that the government could not monitor individuals in "real time" without the same.

In September 2020, the MTRCB proposed the regulation of content distributed through online streaming services including Netflix believing that such content falls under their mandate to regulate and classify "all forms" of motion pictures. The plans raised concerns over censorship and were subsequently dropped.

In 2021, the Philippine Army launched cyberattacks to block access to alternative news websites Bulatlat and AlterMidya. The Media Freedom for All coalition criticized the cyberattacks as assaults on press freedom and free expression. Also in 2021, the police and the military pressured three state university libraries to remove reference books about the peace process between the government and the National Democratic Front.

The cancellations of the premiere screenings of two films from the early 2020s – Lost Sabungeros and Food Delivery: Fresh from the West Philippine Sea – were equally condemned as censorship. Lost Sabungeros was withdrawn from the 2024 Cinemalaya Philippine Independent Film Festival due to vague "security reasons", with the producer Lee Joseph Marquez Castel contemplating whether the film festival had lost its independence or not. Food Delivery was pulled out from Puregold's 2025 CinePanalo Film Festival, with Asia Media Centre citing the supermarket chain's ties to a Chinese supply chain as a major factor in the perceived censorship of the film. Valdivieso (2025) of Democratic Erosion Consortium asserted that the recent film censorships "set a dangerous precedent for creatives, discouraging them from making films that critique the country's current situation or the government's response or lack thereof".

== By medium ==
=== Television and film ===
The Movie and Television Review and Classification Board is responsible for rating television programs and films aired in the Philippines. The government agency can classify a film or television program an X rating, effectively banning the work from public screening. The MTRCB is, however, criticized for its views on what constitutes obscenity, and is also accused of giving the X rating to materials for political reasons such as Ora Pro Nobis by Lino Brocka, which gained controversy for its allegations of continued human rights violations in the Philippines after the 1986 EDSA revolution. The same rating was also given to a 2024 documentary film about the enforced disappearance of an activist, Alipato at Muog, with the X rating subsequently downgraded to R-16 after protests by its director.

Free-to-air television programs in the Philippines are given ratings by the MTRCB depending on content: G (general patronage), PG (parental guidance) and SPG (strong parental guidance) except news and sports programming and commercials (excluding political ones during the campaign season, as these are regulated by the Commission on Elections). Any program assigned an MTRCB rating must carry a full-screen advisory at the beginning of each broadcast and a digital on-screen graphic at the lower right or the upper left of the screen which must be turned on at the beginning of each program or after a commercial break, and turned off at the end of each program or before each commercial break. Programs with an SPG rating, however, must show the rating advisory twice, at the beginning of each program and after the commercial break at the middle of the program, and carry an on-screen graphic of the rating with content qualifiers for themes, language, violence, sex, horror and drug use as applicable in the program.

Most free-to-air television broadcasters censor out nudity, blood and gore, cadavers, scenes of weapons pointed at people and illegal drugs, usually by blurring, graying out or cutting footage. In the recent years, broadcasters have begun editing news footages depicting identities of crime suspects and victims; faces of hospital patients; signatures on public documents such as memorandum circulars and court decisions; and personal documents containing sensitive information to comply with the Data Privacy Act of 2012. Appearance of brand names are also tightly regulated by broadcasters to avoid unintentional product placement and accusations of undisclosed promotion; this include blurring footage or avoiding mentions of the brand in news reporting. The middle finger gesture is generally blurred out (most notably in the 2016 attack ad against Rodrigo Duterte paid for by Antonio Trillanes). Profanity in either English or Filipino are routinely bleeped in free-to-air TV.

Films released in the Philippines are given any of the five content ratings by the MTRCB: G (general patronage), PG (parental guidance), R-13 (restricted 13) R-16 (restricted 16), and R-18 (restricted 18). The MTRCB may also assign an X rating to a film, usually for pornography or extreme graphic violence, banning it from being released in the Philippines; possession of such films is considered a criminal offense.

=== Print media ===
Books, newspapers, and magazines have been subject to censorship in the Philippines. The governor general suppressed Diario de Manila for allegedly inciting Filipinos to rebel against the Spanish colonial government.

During the American colonial period, nationalistic newspapers that were critical of regressive taxes and abusive capitalists were suppressed by the colonial government.

=== Internet ===
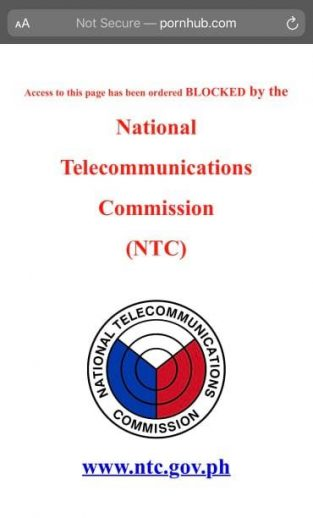
A 2020 notice by the National Telecommunications Commission informing the user that it has blocked access to Pornhub

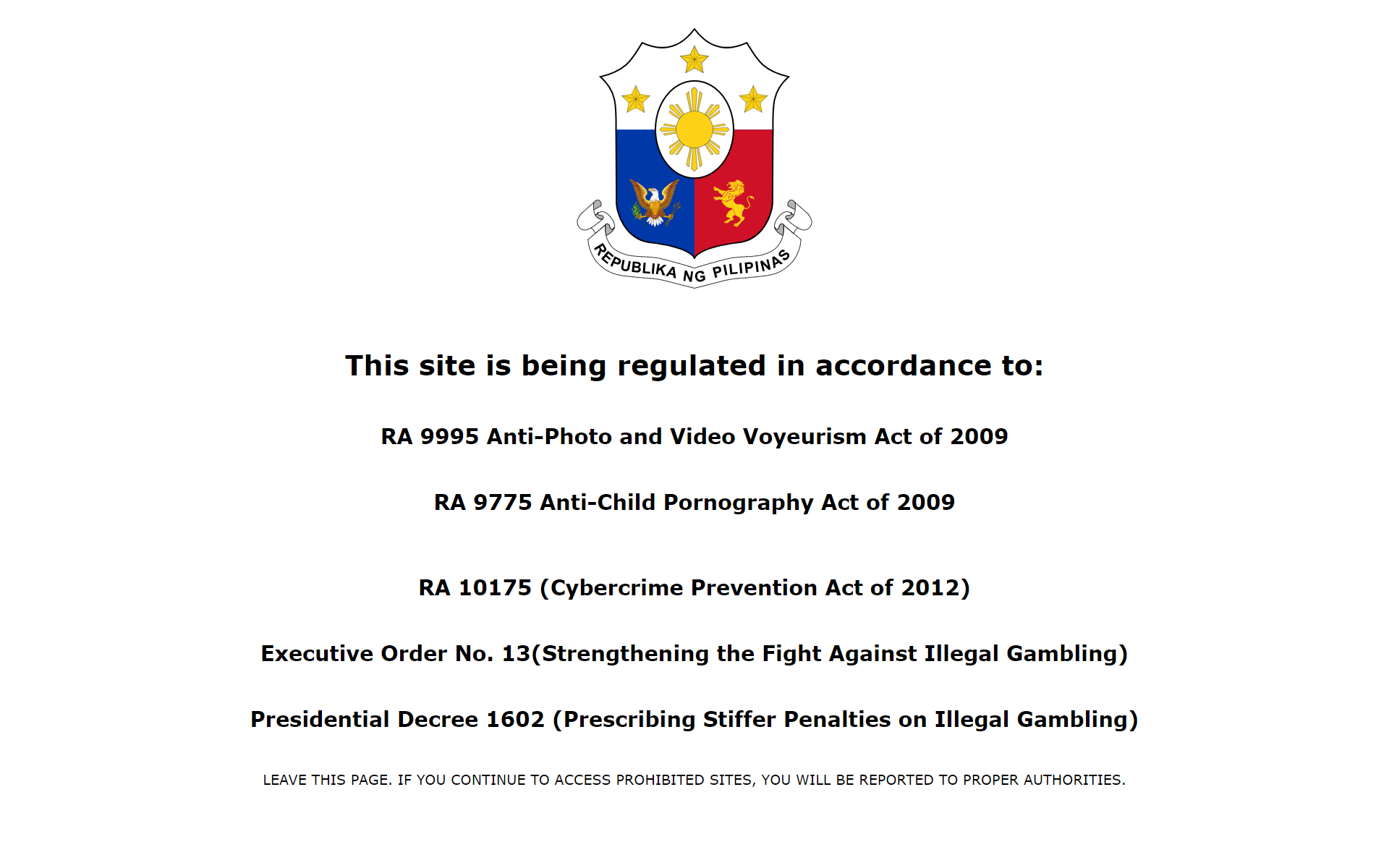
A 2024 notice that appears when attempting to access censored sites from the Philippines

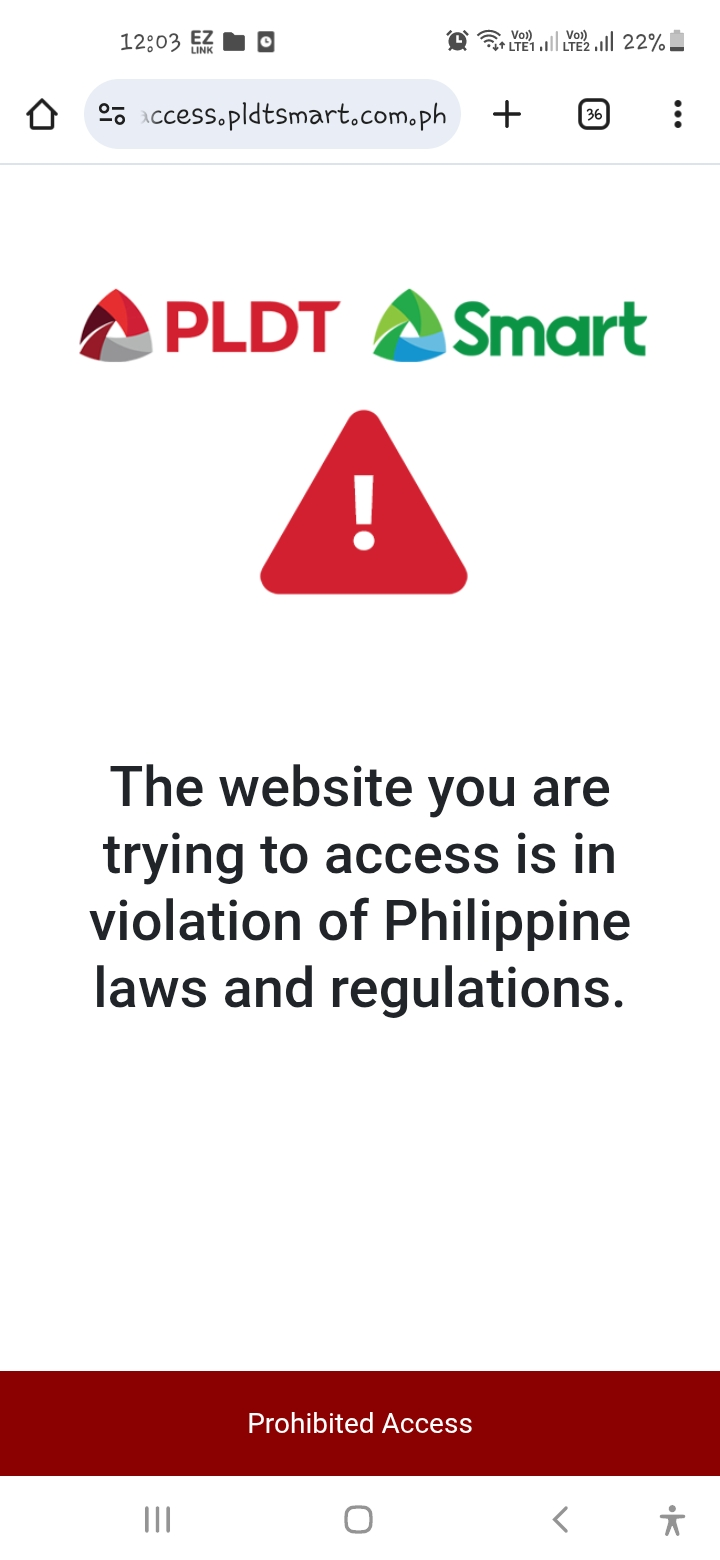
PLDT-Smart prohibited access page

The Freedom on the Net 2024 by the Freedom House scored the Philippines 60 out of 100, classifying its internet freedom status as "partly free".

The Freedom House in its 2013 report said that it did not receive reports that officials are pressuring bloggers or online journalists to delete content deemed critical to the authorities. However, it said that "many news websites are online versions of traditional media which self-censor due to the level of violence against journalists in the Philippines". It also said that "The government does not require the registration of user information prior to logging online or subscribing to internet and mobile phone services, especially since prepaid services are widely available, even in small neighborhood stores." The same report also stated that the Cybercrime Prevention Act of 2012 negatively affected the state of internet freedom of the country. It has also noted that the internet penetration of the country remains low, which it attributes to PLDT's "de facto monopoly" and lack of infrastructure and bureaucratic government regulation. The study says that the monopoly resulted to high broadband subscription fees.

A study released in March 2014 by United States–based Pew Research Center stated that most Filipinos found access to the internet without censorship important or somewhat important. A total of 35% of respondents reported that they found internet access without censorship "very important", 38% "somewhat important", 18% "not too important", and 6% "not important", while the rest reported that they did not know or refused to answer.

In 2017, a large number of pornographic websites, including Pornhub, Xhamster, and RedTube, were blocked under suspicion of hosting child pornography.

The National Telecommunications Commission (NTC) issued an order in June 2022 for internet service providers to block access to 26 websites that were allegedly "affiliated to and are supporting" the Communist Party of the Philippines, New People's Army, and the National Democratic Front, including the media outlet Bulatlat. A Quezon City court issued an injunction in August 2022 ordering the NTC to unblock Bulatlat's website, citing the news website's rights to be protected by the constitutional provision on freedom of speech and of the press. In November 2025, a Quezon City court ordered the unblocking of the websites, saying that the NTC blocking is content-based prior restraint that "violates the constitutional guarantees of free speech and expression". The court said that the Philippine Anti-Terror Act is not a legal basis for the NTC order to block the websites.

In September 2026, two websites that "groomers" allegedly use to radicalize children into committing real-life terror acts were blocked upon the order of the National Telecommunications Commission. According to Philippine National Police spokesperson PCol. Allan Rae Co, the involved websites "are used to promote real-world violence, where children are groomed and given a kind of tasking, starting from superficial ones...until such time that they end up in shootings and assaults in real life". The police noted that they are tracking down "other websites promoting real-world violence on social media". The recent actions on blocking harmful websites came after several incidents of school shootings in the country, beginning with the 2026 Tacloban school shooting.

=== Visual arts ===
In 2011, Cultural Center of the Philippines took down the group exhibit Kulo (Boil), following pressure from religious leaders and politicians to remove the multimedia installation "Poleteismo" by Mideo Cruz. The installation prompted public debate on art and censorship and its subsequent removal sparked protests from democracy and freedom of expression advocates.

=== Video games ===
No video games are officially banned in the Philippines, but video games were officially banned from 1981 to 1986 and later Letter of Instruction No. 1176 s. 81 following a moral panic over its perceived effects on the youth.

The Philippines also does not have its own video game content rating system, but most video games sold by in-store retailers in the Philippines carry Entertainment Software Rating Board (ESRB) ratings.

== See also ==
- Cybercrime Prevention Act of 2012
- Freedom of religion in the Philippines
