= Movie and Television Review and Classification Board =

Philippine government agency

- Lupon sa Rebyu at Klasipikasyon ng Pelikula at Telebisyon
- Official logo

Agency overview
- Formed: October 5, 1985; 41 years ago
- Preceding agency: Board of Censors for Motion Pictures (1961–1985)
- Type: Film and television classification
- Headquarters: 18 MTRCB Building, Timog Avenue, Quezon City, 1103, Metro Manila, Philippines
- Motto: Filipino: "Para sa Matalino at Responsableng Panonood" (transl. For intelligent and responsible viewing)
- Employees: 51 (2024)
- Agency executive: Lala Sotto, Chairperson and CEO
- Parent agency: Office of the President of the Philippines
- Website: mtrcb.gov.ph

The Movie and Television Review and Classification Board (MTRCB; Filipino: Lupon sa Rebyu at Klasipikasyon ng Pelikula at Telebisyon) is a Philippine government agency under the Office of the President of the Philippines that is responsible for the classification and review of television programs, motion pictures and home videos.

Unlike other organizations worldwide, the Board does not rate video games. Thus, both the ESRB system used in the United States, and IARC system are the de facto rating systems used in the Philippines, although there have been attempts at formulating an independent local rating system. Certain video game vendors ask for a valid ID or other verification of those seeking to buy M- and AO-rated games. The Board also does not rate literature.

The Movie and Television Review and Classification Board also serves as a de facto censorship body.

== History ==
=== Board of Censors for Motion Pictures ===
The MTRCB was previously the Board of Censors for Motion Pictures (BCMP), a censorship agency established by virtue of Republic Act No. 3060 signed by President Carlos P. Garcia in June 1961 and directly subordinate to the Office of the President of the Philippines. The BCMP had its headquarters at the Don Roman Santos Building in Plaza Goiti (now Plaza Lacson), Santa Cruz, Manila. Over the years, its name and powers were changed and expanded by succeeding administrations. In 1980, as part of Executive Order No. 585 issued by President Ferdinand Marcos during the Martial Law, the Board was reconstituted to include senior officials of the Ministry of Justice, the Ministry of Education and Culture, the Ministry of National Defense, the Ministry of Public Information and the National Intelligence and Security Authority (NISA).

=== Board of Review for Motion Pictures and Television ===
To reflect the rising influence of television in the Philippines, the agency was renamed into the Board of Review for Motion Pictures and Television (BRMPT) by virtue of Executive Order No. 745 issued by Marcos in November 1981. In 1983, its scope was expanded to include live entertainment, and as such the Board was renamed by Marcos into the Board of Review for Motion Pictures, Television and Live Entertainment by virtue of Executive Order No. 868. Controversially, it was also given the power to bar any film deemed "subversive" in content and "undermining faith in the government".

=== Movie and Television Review and Classification Board ===
Ultimately, the economic and political crisis of the 1980s led the Marcos regime to abolish the board and replace it with the current Movie and Television Review and Classification Board in October 1985 by virtue of Presidential Decree No. 1986. After the fall of the Marcos dictatorship in 1986, the Board was reconstituted to remove defense and security officials and limit its composition to civilian personnel, though the ban on subversive material remains. In the 1990s, the Appeals Committee was revived to allow appeal and reversals of the MTRCB's decisions.

The chairman, the vice-chairman and the other 30 Board members compose the Board. Each one holds office for a term of one year, but may be reappointed after the expiration of their term. Diorella Maria Sotto-Antonio has been the board chairperson since July 7, 2022.

== Chairpersons ==
Board of Censors for Motion Pictures

Image	Name	Term	Appointed by
	Jose Guevara	1962–1965	Diosdado Macapagal
	Feliciano J. Ledesma	1965–1966	Diosdado Macapagal
	Guillermo de Vega	1969–1975	Ferdinand Marcos
	Ma. Rocio Atienza de Vega	1975–1976	Ferdinand Marcos
	Carmelo Z. Barbero	1976–1980 (acting)	Ferdinand Marcos

Board of Review for Motion Pictures and Television

Image	Name	Term	Appointed by
	Maria Kalaw Katigbak	1981–1985	Ferdinand Marcos

Movie and Television Review and Classification Board

Image	Name	Term	Appointed by
	Juan A. Sison	1985–1986 (acting)	Ferdinand Marcos
	Armida Siguion-Reyna	1986 (acting)	Corazon Aquino
	Manuel Morato	1986–1992	Corazon Aquino
	Henrietta Silos Mendez	1992–1995	Fidel V. Ramos
	Jesus C. Sison	1995–1998	Fidel V. Ramos
	Armida Siguion-Reyna	1998–2001	Joseph Estrada
	Nicanor Tiongson	2001 (acting)	Gloria Macapagal Arroyo
	Alejandro Roces	2001–2002	Gloria Macapagal Arroyo
	Marilen Ysmael-Dinglasan	2002 (acting)	Gloria Macapagal Arroyo
	Dennis Manicad	2002–2003	Gloria Macapagal Arroyo
	Marissa Laguardia	2003–2010	Gloria Macapagal Arroyo
	Grace Poe	2010–2012	Benigno Aquino III
	Emmanuel Borlaza	2012 (acting)	Benigno Aquino III
	Toto Villareal	2012–2017	Benigno Aquino III
	Maria Rachel Arenas	2017–2021	Rodrigo Duterte
	Jeremiah Jaro	2021–2022	Rodrigo Duterte
	Juan "Johnny" Revilla	2022	Bongbong Marcos
	Lala Sotto	2022–present	Bongbong Marcos

== Classification ratings ==
=== Movies ===
The rating labels used in the Philippines for feature films.

While the MTRCB primarily rates most films released in commercial cinemas, independent and art-house films released in the Philippines are not rated by the MTRCB themselves. Instead, they are rated through the Film Development Council of the Philippines and the Film Cultural Exchange Program (FCEP) through the FDCP rating system pursuant to the agreed-upon guidelines by the FDCP and the MTRCB.

==== Summary ====
	Description
G	Viewers of all ages are admitted.
PG	Viewers under 13 years old should be accompanied by a parent or supervising adult.
R-13	Only viewers who are 13 years old and above can be admitted.
R-16	Only viewers who are 16 years old and above can be admitted.
R-18	Only viewers who are 18 years old and above can be admitted.
X	"X-rated" films are not suitable for public exhibition.

Pursuant to the rules and regulations, MTRCB cinema ratings are legally binding. No children under the age of 13 may be admitted to a PG-rated film unless when accompanied by an adult. All moviehouses are required to check the ages of all patrons who wish to view age-restricted content. It is against the law for moviehouses to admit underage patrons into age-restricted content. The public exhibition of an "X-rated" film in the Philippines is a serious criminal offense and may lead to more severe disciplinary actions.

A film shall be disapproved for public viewing if, in the judgment of the Board:

1. The average person, applying contemporary community standards and values, would find that the dominant theme of the work, taken as a whole appeals solely to the prurient interest and satisfies only the craving for gratuitous sex and/or violence.
2. The film depicts in a patently lewd, offensive, or demeaning manner, excretory functions and sexual conduct such as sexual intercourse, masturbation and exhibition of the genitals.
3. The film clearly constitutes an attack against any race, creed, or religion.
4. The film condones or encourages abuse and exploitation against women and/or children.
5. The film promotes or endorses the use of illegal drugs and substances.
6. The film tends to undermine the faith and confidence of the people in their government and/or duly constituted authorities.
7. The film glorifies criminals or condones crimes.
8. The film may constitute contempt of court or of a quasi-judicial tribunal, or may pertain to matters which are subjudicial in nature.

=== Television ===
The MTRCB has implemented a television content rating system since April 27, 1992. Historically, there were only two television ratings used. These ratings consisted of a plain text digital on-screen graphic appearing on the corner of the screen during a program's run time.

System used from October 6, 2011, to present
Pictogram	Rating
	General Patronage
	Parental Guidance (Patnubay at Gabay)
	Strong Parental Guidance (Striktong Patnubay at Gabay)

On October 6, 2011, in order to encourage parents to supervise and be responsible with their children in watching television, the rating system was reformatted, with one additional rating added.

The ratings notice and pictogram are shown during the show's timeslot both in English and Filipino. For the narration version, they are narrated at the start and midway of the program proper usually in Filipino but predominantly English-language stations have the ratings notice spoken in English (within abroad, GMA Pinoy TV, GMA Life TV, GMA News TV International, Kapatid Channel International, AksyonTV International, The Filipino Channel, Cinema One and ANC; only in English). Ratings notices were previously broadcast in a 4:3 aspect ratio, but has since been broadcast in a 16:9 widescreen format.

Any television program that does not conform to the "G", "PG", and "SPG" classification shall be unfit for television broadcast if, in the judgment of the Board applying contemporary Filipino cultural values as standard, it is objectionable for being immoral, indecent, contrary to law and/or good customs, injurious to the prestige of the Republic of the Philippines or its people, or with a dangerous tendency to encourage the commission of violence, or of a wrong, or crime, such as but not limited to:

1. The average person, applying contemporary community standards and values, would find that the dominant theme of the work, taken as a whole appeals solely to the prurient interest and satisfies only the craving for gratuitous sex and/or violence.
2. The work depicts in a patently lewd, offensive, or demeaning manner, excretory functions, and sexual conduct such as sexual intercourse, masturbation and exhibition of the genitals.
3. The work clearly constitutes an attack against any race, creed or religion.
4. The work condones or encourages abuse and exploitation against women and/or children.
5. The work promotes or endorses the use of illegal drugs and substances.
6. The work tends to undermine the faith and confidence of the people in their government and/or duly constituted authorities.
7. The work glorifies criminals or condones crimes.
8. The work is libelous or defamatory to the good name and reputation of any person, whether living or dead.
9. The work may constitute contempt of court of a quasi-judicial tribunal, or may pertain to matters, which are subjudicial in nature.

== Home videos ==
The Optical Media Board formerly governed censorship for home video releases; this has since been managed by the Movie and Television Review and Classification Board.

Before 2015, unlike the theatrical ratings, only three are applied to video releases and printed on labels: General Audience (G) for films previously rated G in cinemas, Parental Guidance (PG) for most PG and some R-13 or R-16 titles (with cuts for the R-ratings), and Restricted For Adults (R) for some R-13, many R-16, and most R-18 titles [without cuts for R-16 and R-18, including films released unrated or with adults-only rating equivalents (e.g. R, 18, M18, NC-17, Category III, and R21) outside the Philippines].

Since 2015, the theatrical ratings were applied as home video ratings, replacing the previous system.

In addition to issuing parental ratings for home video content, routine inspections are also conducted at public transport terminals where passenger buses equipped with onboard entertainment systems can be found, to ensure that the films in question are approved by both agencies for public exhibition and are free of inappropriate content.

== Advertisement ==
Advertisement materials are generally outside the scope of the board. Exemptions are "publicity materials" that are those "used to generate public interest in a motion picture or television program such as teasers or promos of television programs, movie trailers, print advertisements, still photos, photo frames, leaflets, posters and billboards and other related media".

== Internet ==
Although the board itself does not govern nor does it censor TV shows and movies online, video streaming services such as Viu, Disney+, WeTV, iflix, Netflix, iQIYI, Apple TV, HBO Max, and Amazon Prime Video make use of their own content rating systems to ensure whether content is family-friendly or not.

On September 3, 2020, it was reported that MTRCB wanted to seek the "regulation" of video content that is provided by streaming platforms such as Netflix. According to Atty. Jonathan Presquito, the MTRCB legal affairs division chief, there is a necessity proceed with the regulation, especially because several video content are unrated. However, the move was strongly criticized by several groups and people, noting that the MTRCB has become a tool of censorship. Senator Franklin Drilon said that the move was "very impractical".

== Criticism ==
Despite touting itself as promoting Filipino values and "intelligent viewing", the board has drawn criticism from filmmakers and special interest groups for its vested interest in the film and television industries, de facto censorship, stifling of creative freedoms on the grounds of family-friendliness, and allegations of inaccuracy in film and television ratings.

Critics contend that the board has not rated certain media, particularly international superhero, action and fantasy films, such as Michael Bay's Transformers and the Harry Potter series (based on the novels by J.K. Rowling), along with locally produced romantic comedies, strongly for violent or sexual themes, noting the arbitrary and biased classification based on board members' opinions on certain films for mature audiences yet overlooking certain scenes or themes that would be given a higher rating elsewhere.

Since 2019, MTRCB announced that they banned movies like Abominable, and Uncharted immediately due to the film's scene involving the nine-dash line at the map of South China Sea, being reached out of controversy at the Southeast Asia (including Philippines).

In 2024 the Board under Sotto received criticism for its stifling of free expression and religious convictions of their members forming the basis of their censure of audiovisual works, particularly in the films Alipato at Muog and Dear Satan, the former banned for "undermining the faith and confidence" of the country's institutions and the latter for perceived glorification of Satan as a being who redeemed himself after unsuccessfully tempting a young girl into evil. The Directors’ Guild of the Philippines Inc. (DGPI) accused the board of overreach in their mandate by basing their verdict on Dear Satan on Lala Sotto's religious convictions; while Dear Satan was ultimately shelved when the MTRCB reaffirmed its decision, they re-rated Alipato at Muog after a formal appeal and protests by JL Burgos and various activists at the MTRCB office.

== Content sanctions ==
Aside from administering parental ratings for movies and television shows, the MTRCB also reserves the right to sanction a certain program or movie depending on the gravity of the violation as a means of disciplinary action. This includes all content sanctions by the MTRCB on domestically produced contents. However, cases focusing on suspension of television program broadcasting and movies banned for public screening are covered in separate articles.

=== International content ===
- On January 4, 2000, a broadcast of the children's television series Teletubbies on GMA Network was accidentally replaced by a still photo of actress Rosanna Roces for several seconds. The photo shows one of her breasts exposed, prompting MTRCB to issue a warning that the station would face stronger sanctions should this, or a similar incident, be repeated. GMA officials stated that the incident was caused by an errant employee who pressed a button on a panel while helping repair a computer.
- On July 2, 2018, the replay broadcast of the FIBA Asia qualifying match on TV5 was given an SPG rating after the commercial break to warn the audience that the following scene contained the infamous basketball brawl between Gilas Pilipinas and the Australian Boomers.
- In November 2021, the MTRCB ordered streaming platform Netflix to remove certain episodes of Pine Gap showing the nine-dash line, deeming it "unfit for public exhibition". It was after the foreign affairs department issued a complaint calling the line "illegal" and a "violation of Philippine sovereignty".

=== Domestic content ===
- The episode Manika on the drama anthology Maalaala Mo Kaya was slated to be aired on June 2, 2012, but was pulled off after MTRCB imposed an X rating because of its sensitive rape theme. The episode finally aired on June 30, after it was given a SPG rating for its final televised airing.
- On February 8, 2013, the MTRCB imposed a six-month probation period on variety show Party Pilipinas for a lewd dance number involving Lovi Poe and Rocco Nacino. They also ordered GMA Network to apologize publicly.
- On February 26, 2013, the MTRCB summoned the staff of the weekly musical-variety show ASAP to a gender-sensitivity investigation over a wet performance number involving Anne Curtis.
- On December 9, 2013, sketch-comedy show Bubble Gang host Michael V., Rufa Mae Quinto, and GMA Network's executives, were summoned by MTRCB chairman Eugenio Villareal for a mandatory conference after a sexually sensitive comedy skit called "The Adventures of Susie Lualhati" which aired on November 29 and involved a derogatory and discriminatory portrayal of women.
- On June 6, 2014, the MTRCB was summoned by the Philippine Commission on Women to review an episode of reality show Pinoy Big Brother: All In aired on June 4, 2014, where Jayme Jalandoni was asked if she wanted to pose nude for a painting, as part of their sixth weekly task.
- On October 7, 2015, the daily reality-dating game serial Nasaan Ka Mr. Pastillas? on It's Showtime drew the ire of netizens and the women's group Gabriela for its allegedly derogatory portrayal of women. The MTRCB summoned the show's executives to discuss the segment. After a thorough investigation, MTRCB imposed "self-regulation" on the said show, with a list of suggestions to improve the segment.
- On July 29, 2016, the MTRCB sent summons to the producers, writers, and directors of the television series FPJ's Ang Probinsyano over a scene in the July 25 episode (Girl in the Rain) with "sexually suggestive themes".
- In 2016, executives and producers of romantic dramedy Till I Met You were summoned after complaints came in over various inappropriate scenes and innuendo involving James Reid and Nadine Lustre. Called in were directors Antoinette Jadaone and Andoy Ranay, executive producer Arnel Nacario and writer Shugo Praico. MTRCB said matters to be taken up include scenes from the October 25–28 episodes, deeming them inappropriate for public viewing.
- On September 6, 2017, the MTRCB summoned drama series Impostora for intimate scenes involving Kris Bernal and Rafael Rosell.
- On May 31, 2023, an alleged violation of Eat Bulaga! (formerly produced by TAPE Inc.), namely airing a replay to prevent the former mainstay hosts, Tito Sotto, Vic Sotto, and Joey de Leon, from live broadcast, was investigated by the board to ensure compliance on broadcasting regulations.
- On August 11, 2023, E.A.T. (under TVJ Productions; reverted to Eat Bulaga! since 2024) was summoned by the board over the utterance of profanity by host Wally Bayola in the segment Sugod Bahay, Mga Kapatid! which aired on August 10, 2023.
- On January 31, 2024, the board banned the talk show Private Convos with Doc Rica on Cignal-owned news channel One News. It was hosted by sex therapist Rica Cruz and focused on sexuality-related matters, saying that it "purely appeals to ‘prurient interest’" and failed to adhere to its rating guidelines. It specifically cited two episodes that were aired on August 24, 2023 and September 6, 2023, during which the sexually explicit terms such as self-masturbation, anal sex, and oral sex were voiced out, and noted that the program was broadcast in what it deemed were "child-viewing hours" at 09:30 pm on Wednesdays, with reruns in the afternoons. The MTRCB upheld its ban in a decision released on March 14, 2024, despite Cignal TV asserting that the program was of “educational and social value.”. The program, however, continued broadcasting on One News' YouTube channel and Facebook page.

== See also ==
- Censorship in the Philippines
- List of films banned in the Philippines
- Optical Media Board
- Television content rating systems
- Motion picture rating system
- Ad Standards Council of the Philippines
- National Telecommunications Commission
