= List of entertainment news programs =

This is a list of entertainment news programs. An entertainment news program focuses on news involving the entertainment industry, including the world of film, television and music.

== A ==
- Access Hollywood
- Ang Latest
- Aquino & Abunda Tonight
- Aux Weekly

== B ==
- Best Week Ever
- BET Style
- Big Morning Buzz Live
- Boulevard of Broken Dreams
- The Buzz

== C ==
- Confidential
- Cristy Per Minute
- A Current Affair

== D ==
- The Daily 10
- Dish Nation
- DVD Show

== E ==
- E! News
- E! True Hollywood Story
- Entertainment Desk
- Entertainment Live
- Entertainment Spotlight
- Entertainment Tonight
- Entertainment Tonight Canada
- Entertainment Tonight UK
- Escandalo TV
- ESPN Hollywood
- Etalk
- Extra

== F ==
- FashionTelevision
- FAX

== G ==
- El Gordo y la Flaca
- The Gossip Table

== H ==
- Hard Copy
- Hollywood 411
- H.O.T. TV
- HypaSpace

== I ==
- Inside Edition
- The Insider
- El Intermedio
- The Alex Jones Show

== J ==
- Juicy!

== M ==
- MTV e2
- MTV News
- MTV News (Canada)
- Mysteries and Scandals

== N ==
- National Enquirer TV
- The NewMusic

== O ==
- Oh So Cosmo
- OK!TV
- On the Red Carpet

== P ==
- Paparazzi
- Play

== R ==
- Reel to Real

== S ==
- S-Files
- Screen Scene
- Sé lo que hicisteis...
- Showbiz Central
- Showbiz Inside Report
- Showbiz Lingo
- Showbiz Police
- The Showbiz Show with David Spade
- Showbiz Tonight
- SNN: Showbiz News Ngayon
- Space Top 10 Countdown
- Star! Daily
- Startalk
- Startv

== T ==
- TMZ on TV

== V ==
- Verissimo

== W ==
- What'z Up?
- World of Playboy

== Y ==
- Young Hollywood
