= Juan Paolo Aquino =

Filipino TV director and photographer

Juan Paolo "Jaypee" Aquino is a Filipino TV director and photographer. He has been producing and directing for Philippine TV for more than a decade.

A graduate of the London Film School, Aquino lived in London during his college years and worked in a number of international film productions before going back to Manila. Some of his short films were exhibited in a number of major film festivals throughout Europe.

== Career ==
In early 2000, Aquino was assigned to direct travel documentaries for a Filipino International Channel. He then started producing for mainstream TV in 2001, one of which was for Digital Tour—now considered the longest running magazine show on technology in the Philippines. He also directed a diversity of local magazine shows for TV - Kiss The Cook with Ryan Agoncillo, The Good Life with Cory Quirino, Chef's On The Go with Mark Gil and Hanap Buhay Overseas with Angelique Lazo.

He also started his own personal project and tried his knack for photography. He spent more than five months travelling around Southeast Asia, China, and South America to document the wealth of cultures from the different countries in the region. Emotional Core was the name of the project. Some of his works have also been selected to be a part of the Dazed And Confused European Exhibit Project.

He directed the daily showbiz talk show Juicy!, and the social media music show SPINNation which aired on TV5.

=== Filmography ===
Year	Title	Position	Company
2000	Balikbayan Trail	Director	Lakbay TV
2003	The Cory Quirino Show	Director	Studio 23
2004	The Good Life	Director	Studio 23
2005	Kiss The Cook	Director	Lifestyle Network
2008	Juicy!	Director	TV5
2009	Dare Duo	Executive Producer	QTV
2010	I Laugh Sabado	Executive Producer	QTV
2011	Sarap at Home	Executive Producer	GMA News TV
2012	Ang Latest	Headwriter	TV5
2012	Artista Academy	Headwriter	TV5
2013	Spinnation	Director	TV5
2013	Showbiz Police	Headwriter	TV5
2014	Talentadong Pinoy 2014	Headwriter	TV5
2015	Showbiz Konek na Konek	Headwriter	TV5
