= S2: Showbiz Sabado =

2003 Philippine television talk show

- Genre: Talk show
- Directed by: Arnel Natividad
- Presented by: Edu Manzano; Alfie Lorenzo; Cristy Fermin
- Country of origin: Philippines
- Original language: Filipino
- No. of episodes: 25

Production
- Running time: 90 minutes
- Production company: ABS-CBN Entertainment

Original release
- Network: ABS-CBN
- Release: March 22 – September 13, 2003

Related
- EK Channel (2004–2005); Showbiz Lingo; The Buzz

S2: Showbiz Sabado is a Philippine television talk show broadcast by ABS-CBN. Hosted by Edu Manzano, Alfie Lorenzo, Cristy Fermin and Ogie Diaz, it aired on the network's Saturday evening line up from March 22 to September 13, 2003, replacing Tanging Yaman: The Series and was replaced by To the Max.

== History and format ==
In March 2003, Cristy Fermin returned to the ABS-CBN's formidable roster of hosts when she was named main host of the new Saturday gabfest "S2: Showbiz Sabado". To add more noise to the show, her erstwhile nemesis Alfie Lorenzo was named her co-host. It can be recalled that the two had a word war over the loveteam woes of Judy Ann Santos and Piolo Pascual. The warring duo was joined by Edu Manzano (Fermin's former co-host in "Showbiz Lingo Plus") as the show's "neutralizer". "S2" managed to steal "Startalk"'s loyal viewers for a while with its no-nonsense showbiz news and segments that were similar to their competitor. However, the fun stopped in September 2003 when "S2" was axed due to management decision to reformat the Saturday afternoon time slot. Eventually, Fermin was absorbed in "The Buzz" to form a controversial trio with Boy Abunda and Kris Aquino, marking her return to the Sunday late afternoon time slot.

== Hosts ==
- Edu Manzano
- Alfie Lorenzo
- Cristy Fermin
- Ogie Diaz

== See also ==
- List of programs broadcast by ABS-CBN
