= Mr. Fu =

Filipino radio and television personality

- Born: Jeffrey Espiritu; Philippines
- Occupations: Radio personality, television personality
- Years active: 1999–present
- Presenting career
- Station: 91.5 Win Radio

Jeffrey Espiritu, better known on-air as Mr. Fu, is a Filipino radio and television personality. Known for being a radio DJ on 91.5 Win Radio and formerly on 103.5 Wow FM and 106.7 Energy FM, he is also known for his appearances on several programs mostly on TV5 and notable for his works for the Manila Bulletin.

He earned his screen name – which originally stood for "Mr. Follow-Up". – from the show Direct Line on RPN 9, which he co-anchored; after delivering a spiel comically, somehow the name Mr. Fu just came up. He is known for his expression "Meganon?" ("May gan’on?" in standard Tagalog, literally 'Really?' or 'Is that a thing?' depending on context) which he usually uses in his radio show.

He is currently hosting the talk shows WTFu and Marites University on Youtube.

== Career ==
Espiritu graduated from high school on Lourdes School of Quezon City and graduated in college on University of Santo Tomas, where he served as student council president of the Faculty of Arts and Letters and where he was classmates with Francis Pasion. He joined RPN as a police reporter, then in his last year as reporter he was called "Mr. FU" or "Mr. Follow Up" in an RPN show, in which he became known as.

In late 2007, he left RPN to be a radio jock at Energy FM, which at the time the frequency was 91.5. After he became a radio jock, he came out as gay. In 2009, he moved to GMA Network. he joined Q's Tweetbiz: The Bizniz of Chizmiz along with Tim Yap and Sam YG (DJ from Magic 89.9). In 2010, he left Energy FM for the newly opened mass based radio, 103.5 Wow FM. In 2010, he also joined the network TV5 as a contract actor, and became co-host for his longtime idol Joey de Leon's Wow Meganon (combined with Wow Mali and Mr. FU's slang "Meganon!"). In 2011, he joined Paparazzi, and became a substitute host for Juicy!. In early 2012, he had a brief feud with Paparazzi co-host Ruffa Gutierrez. In that year, he was also a segment host for Artista Academy: Breaktime with Valeen Montenegro.

In 2013, Mr. Fu and Montenegro hosted a new TV5 gameshow, Jeepney Jackpot, along with former EB Babe and Amazing Race Philippines contestant Saida Diola, he also joined the Manila Bulletin roster of columnist in the entertainment section. On July 16, 2013, he resigns from 103.5 Wow FM and however, he returned to his original radio station, Energy FM which is now moved to the new frequency (which is also the former TV5 original radio station) 106.7.

In 2016, he returned to GMA Network after leaving TV5.

In March 2017, he left 106.7 Energy FM again for 91.5 Win Radio on April 3, 2017.

== Filmography ==
=== Television ===
Year	Title	Role
1999–2007	NewsWatch	Himself/Reporter
2003-2006	Direct Line	Himself/Host
2009	Eat Bulaga!	Himself/Segment host
2009–2010	Tweetbiz: The Bizniz of Chizmiz	Himself/Co-host
2010–2011	P.O.5	Himself/Co-host
2010–2011	Wow Meganon	Himself/Co-host
2010–2012	Paparazzi	Himself/Segment host
2011–2012	Celebrity Samurai	Himself/Co-host
2011–2012 / 2013–2015	Wow Mali	Himself/Co-host/voice-over
2012	Sharon: Kasama Mo, Kapatid	Himself/Guest
2012	Artista Academy: Breaktime	Himself/Host
2012–2013	Ang Latest	Himself/Host
2013	Jeepney Jackpot: Pera o Para!	Himself/Host
2016	Celebrity Bluff	Himself/Guest Bluffer
2016	Pepito Manaloto	Guest
2017	All Star Videoke	Himself/Guest Player
2018	Daddy's Gurl	Guest
2019	Sunday Pinasaya	Himself/Guest
2020	Mars Pa More	Himself/Guest
2021	Happy Together	Guest
2022	TiktoClock	Himself/Guest
2023	Sarap, 'Di Ba?	Himself/Guest
2024	Tahanang Pinakamasaya	Himself/Guest

=== Radio ===
Year	Program
2007–2010 / 2013–2017	Tagabulabog Ng Buong Universe!
2010–2013	Tagabulabog Ng Buong Universe!
2017–2023	The Win Big Show
