= Tweetbiz Insiders =

Philippine television talk show

- Title card
- Also known as: Tweetbiz: The Bizniz of Chizmiz
- Genre: Talk show
- Presented by: Tim Yap; Lolit Solis; Gelli de Belen
- Country of origin: Philippines
- Original language: Tagalog

Production
- Camera setup: Multiple-camera setup
- Running time: 30 minutes
- Production company: GMA News and Public Affairs

Original release
- Network: Q (December 7, 2009 – February 18, 2011); GMA News TV (February 28 – June 3, 2011)
- Release: December 7, 2009 – June 3, 2011

Tweetbiz Insiders formerly as Tweetbiz: The Bizniz of Chizmiz is a Philippine television talk show broadcast by Q and GMA News TV. Hosted by Tim Yap, Lolit Solis and Gelli de Belen, it premiered on December 7, 2009. The show concluded on June 3, 2011. On February 28, 2011, the show premiered as Tweetbiz Insiders on GMA News TV.

== Cast ==
- Tim Yap
- Lolit Solis
- Gelli de Belen
- Justine Ferrer
- Danzen Santos
- Gorgy Rula
- Ronnie Carrasco
- Fabio Ide
- Chariz Solomon
- Sam YG
- Mr. Fu
- Shalala
- Maxene Magalona
- Sebastian
- Suzuki Sadatsugu
- Myster E
