= Cristy Fermin =

Filipino talk show host (born 1956)

- Born: Cristinelli Salazar Fermin; July 23, 1956 (age 70); Quezon, Nueva Ecija, Philippines
- Education: Lyceum of the Philippines University
- Occupations: Talk show host, reporter
- Years active: 1980–present
- Agent(s): BBC (1983–1986); GMA Network (1987–1994); ABS-CBN (1992–2010); IBC (2002); TV5 (since 2010)

Cristinelli "Cristy" Salazar Fermin (Tagalog: [ˈkɾistɪ pɛɾˈmin]; born July 23, 1956) is a Filipino talk show host. She finished her bachelor's degree in journalism at the Lyceum of the Philippines University.

== Career ==
Fermin started her career as a political journalist, but soon turned towards writing for tabloids, about movie stars and other celebrities. Her first television appearance was when she became the main host of the weekend showbiz talk show Movie Magazine on GMA Network in 1987. In 1992, ABS-CBN hired Fermin to host the Sunday talk show Showbiz Lingo with Butch Francisco. Fermin's participation as main host of Showbiz Lingo had the blessings from her producers Inday Badiday, and did not run in conflict with Movie Magazine, which aired on Saturdays. But in 1994, Fermin eventually left Movie Magazine and GMA Network after she signed an exclusive talent contract with ABS-CBN, which in return capitalized on Fermin's new title as the '90s "Queen of Intrigues" by giving her the daily talk show Cristy Per Minute which started airing in 1995. During this period, her residence was in Valenzuela, Metro Manila.

Fermin also presented the ABS-CBN talk show S2: Showbiz Sabado with Edu Manzano and talent manager/host Alfie Lorenzo. After S2 was cancelled, Fermin joined The Buzz as one of its main hosts alongside Boy Abunda and Kris Aquino.

Fermin was suspended by the ABS-CBN management effective October 15, 2008, until December 31, 2008, on both The Buzz and the radio program Showbiz Mismo (later Mismo, then Showbuzz, Showbiz Sidelines and finally Alam Na 'Dis!) of DZMM, due to a controversial rift between her and former actress Nadia Montenegro.

In April 2008, the Supreme Court of the Philippines affirmed a libel conviction and ordered her to pay a fine and damages to couple Anabelle Rama and Eddie Gutierrez instead of serving a jail term previously issued by a lower court.

In 2010, Fermin moved to TV5 as one of the main hosts of the weekly showbiz talk show Paparazzi. She was joined by Mo Twister and former The Buzz co-host Ruffa Gutierrez. She was a co-host of Juicy! with original hosts Alex Gonzaga and IC Mendoza.

On November 8, 2010, she returned to radio when her entertainment news program, Cristy FerMinute, was launched on Radyo5 92.3 News FM (now 105.9 True FM). The program is also simulcast on AksyonTV, later on One PH and True TV.

On July 28, 2012, Paparazzi was cancelled, while Juicy! was cancelled later on August 3. Fermin began hosting Ang Latest on August 4 of the same year.

In a 24 Oras, May 2, 2024 interview, Atty. Jose Manalo Garcia and Shirley Kuan confirmed Bea Alonzo’s filing of 3 Cybercrime Prevention Act of 2012 complaints, including "false" reports of her alleged tax evasion at the Quezon City Prosecutors Office of Ana Fe Abad against Fermin, Ogie Diaz, online "Ogie Diaz Showbiz Update"-"Showbiz Now Na" co-hosts and an unnamed netizen.

On May 10, 2024, Sharon Cuneta and Kiko Pangilinan filed five counts of cyberlibel case with the Makati Prosecutors Office against Fermin for an alleged defamation centering on the couple's "personal and family affairs.” In Cristy FerMinute, Fermin replied thereto - “Territorial po 'yan, 'cyber libel' -- it comes with the territory.” In October 2024, Fermin revealed that she has lost the case and had posted a ₱48,000 bail for each count.

On May 31, 2024, Dominic Roque filed defamation and cyberlibel complaint-affidavit with the Pasig Prosecutors's Office against Fermin. He anchored the criminal case on alleged "malicious statements and innuendos" on her YouTube channel 'Showbiz Now Na' streaming television.

on October 2026, Claudine Barretto filed lawsuit aganist Fermin.

== Filmography ==
=== Television shows ===
Year	Title	Role
1983–1986	Big Ike's Happening, Now!	Segment reporter
1987–1994	Movie Magazine	Host
1992–1997	Showbiz Lingo	Host
1995–2000	Cristy Per Minute	Host
1997–1999	Showbiz Lingo Plus	Host
2002	Lunch Break Muna	Co-Host
2003	S2: Showbiz Sabado	Host
2003–2008	The Buzz	Host
2007–2010	Showbiz Mismo	Host
2010–2012	Juicy!	Host
2010–2012	Paparazzi	Host
2010–2011	Star Confessions	Host
2011	Talentadong Pinoy	Judge
2011–2020; 2021–present	Cristy FerMinute	Host
2012–2013	Ang Latest	Host
2014	Showbiz Police	Host

=== Radio shows ===
Year	Title	Role
2010–present	Cristy FerMinute	Host
2004–2010	Showbiz Mismo	Host

=== Film ===
As public relations officer

Year	Title	Ref(s).
1985	S.W.A.K.: Samahang Walang Atrasan sa Kalaban	
