= Ogie Diaz =

Filipino comedian, actor and talent manager (born 1970)

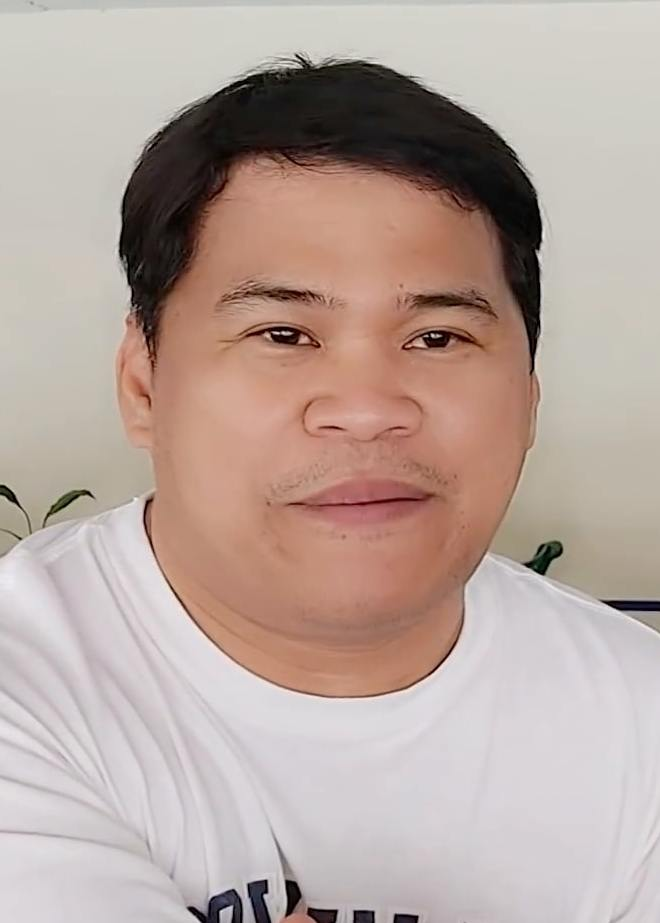
- Diaz in 2021
- Born: Roger Díaz Pandaan; 2 January 1970 (age 56); Quezon City, Philippines
- Occupations: Comedian; actor; reporter; talent manager
- Years active: 1990–present
- Children: 5

Roger "Ogie" Diaz Pandaan (Tagalog: [ˈɔdʒi ˈdias]; born January 2, 1970) is a Filipino comedian, actor, entertainment reporter, and talent manager. He is also popularly known as "Pekto", the name of his character in the long-running former television show Palibhasa Lalake. (Note: Not to be confused with Mike Nacua, another comedian also known by the same nickname.)

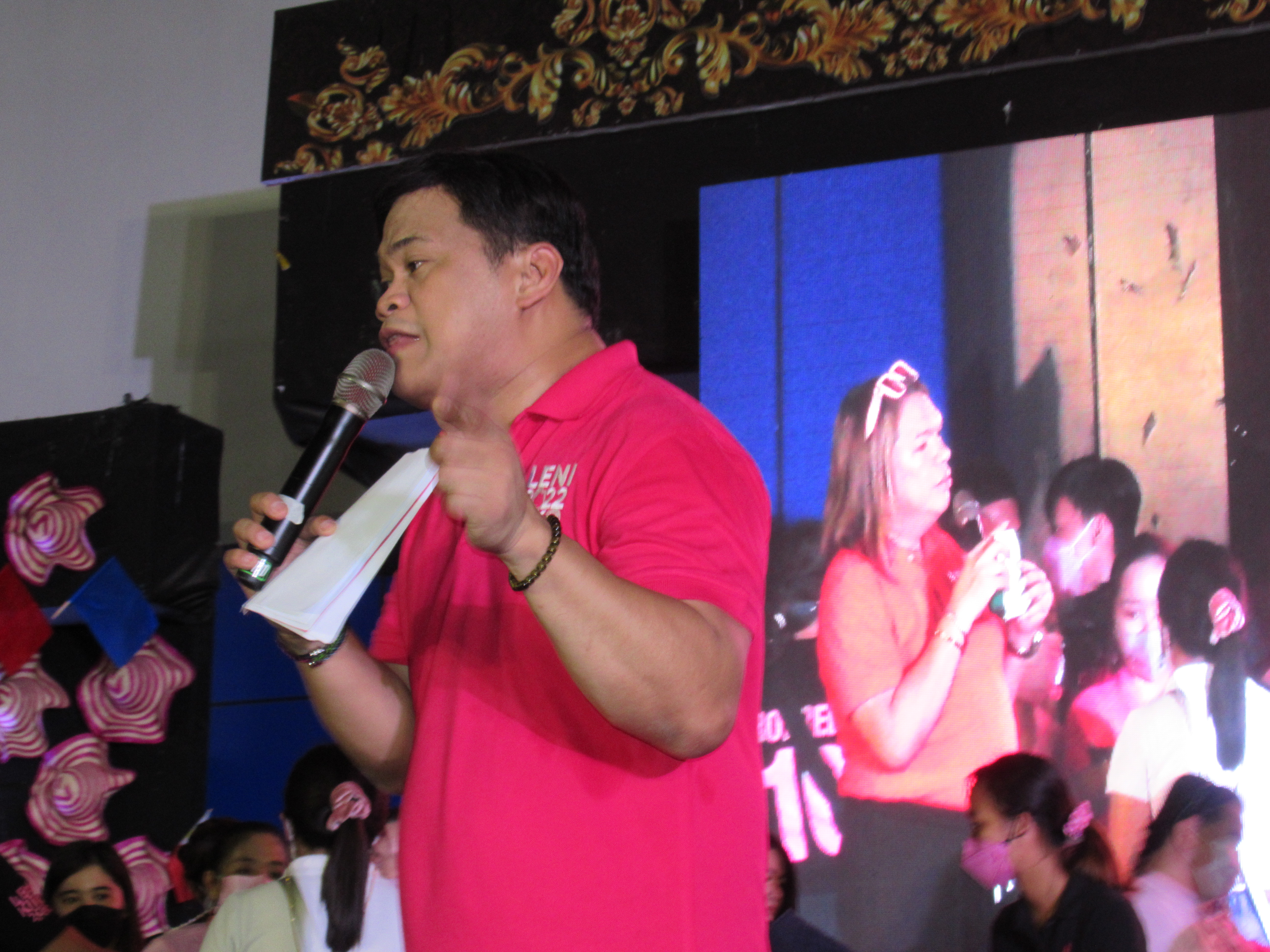
Diaz (Leni Robredo 2022 presidential campaign)

== Early life and career ==
Ogie Diaz was born as Roger Díaz Pandaan on 2 January 1970, Díaz is the sixth of eight siblings. His father was killed during a robbery in 1986 when Diaz was 16. Due to this tragedy, Diaz was not able to continue his higher education and focused on show business instead.

In 1987, Díaz began his career as an assistant to Cristy Fermin, who remains his close friend up to this date, at Mariposa Publications. In an interview, the latter revealed that he would beg loans from his neighbors for a transportation fare to arrive at Fermin's office at GMA Network. Diaz eventually became a writer during the early '90s; this provided him enough money as his family's breadwinner. Later in his career, Diaz tried his luck on talent managing and acting at ABS-CBN. Some of his notable former talent artists include actress Liza Soberano and comedian Vice Ganda.

== Personal life ==
Diaz met his partner Georgette del Rosario, who bore him five children. The couple are open members of the LGBT community. In 2017, Diaz published his book Pak! Humor about being a homosexual father.

In 24 Oras, May 2 interview, Atty. Jose Manalo Garcia and Shirley Kuan confirmed Bea Alonzo’s filing of 3 Cybercrime Prevention Act of 2012 complaints, including “false” reports of her alleged tax evasion at the Quezon City Prosecutors Office of Ana Fe Abad against Cristy Fermin, Diaz, online "Ogie Diaz Showbiz Update"-"Showbiz Now Na" co-hosts and an unnamed netizen.

== Filmography ==
=== Film ===
Year	Title	Role	Notes
1993	Home Along da Riles da Movie	Movie Director	
1993	Maricris Sioson: Japayuki	Bernie	
1993	Bulag, Pipi, at Bingi		
1993	May Minamahal	Didoy	
1994	Nag-Iisang Bituin		
1994	Anghel na Walang Langit		
1994	The Secrets of Sarah Jane: Sana'y Mapatawad Mo	Don	
1994	Ging Gang Gooly Giddiyap: I Love You Daddy		
1994	Shake, Rattle & Roll V	Mitoy	Segment:"Anino"
1995	Pare Ko	Mr. Holgado	
1995	Hataw Na!	Oscar Cabalos	
1995	Araw-Araw, Gabi-Gabi		
1995	Rollerboys	Elvis	
1996	Radio Romance	Loy	
1996	Ama, Ina, Anak	Hector	
1996	Nasaan Ka Nang Kailangan Kita	Aphrodite	
1997	Ikaw Pala Ang Mahal Ko	Alvin	
1998	Alipin ng Aliw		
1998	Hiling	Arnell	
1998	Puso ng Pasko	Host	
1999	Tigasin	Gay Attendant	
2000	Live Show	Kadyot	
2000	Most Wanted		
2000	Yakapin Mo Ang Umaga	Ayo	
2001	Narinig Mo Na Ba ang L8est?	Nestor	
2002	Hari ng Selda: Anak ni Baby Ama 2	Reporter	
2002	Super B	Media Reporter	
2003	Sex Drive	Mani	
2004	Gagamboy	Stage manager	
2008	One Night Only	Meliton	
2009	Wizards of Waverly Place: The Movie	Max Russo	Tagalog dub
2012	Kimmy Dora and the Temple of Kiyeme	Judge/Charito's uncle	
2013	Call Center Girl	Midang	
2014	Maybe This Time	Mae	
2018	Recipe for Love		
2019	The Mall, the Merrier!	Nicole	
2021	Revirginized	Mediator	
2021	Big Night!	Himself	
2023	In His Mother's Eyes	Bogart	
2024	A Journey	Showbiz reporter	

Key
†	Denotes films that have not yet been released

=== Television ===
Year	Title	Role	Notes
1992–1999	Showbiz Lingo	Himself	
1987–1996	Ganda	Jaime	
1995–1999	Cristy Per Minute	Himself	
1997	Wansapanataym	Menoy	Episode:"Salamin"
1997–2000	Tabing Ilog	Ige	
1999–2001	Pwedeng Pwede	Charlotte	
2002–2003	Bituin	Ogie	
2003	S2: Showbiz Sabado	Himself (host)	
2004–2005	Showbiz No. 1	Himself (host)	
2004–2005	Magandang Umaga, Bayan	Himself	showbiz segment
2005–2007	Magandang Umaga, Pilipinas	Himself	showbiz segment
2007–2008	Umagang Kay Ganda	Himself	showbiz segment
2008	That's My Doc	Indyanera Jones	
2008	Volta	Gas Napulgas	
2009–2010	May Bukas Pa	Atong	
2010	Momay	Mando	
2010–2012	Entertainment Live	Himself (host)	
2011	Mutya	Romel	
2012	Walang Hanggan	Kenneth	
2012–2013	Showbiz Inside Report	Himself	
2013	Bet on Your Baby	Himself (guest)	
2013	May Isang Pangarap	Percy	
2013	Huwag Ka Lang Mawawala	Roger Alegria	
2014	Buzz ng Bayan		
2014	Dyesebel	Tomas	
2015	Nathaniel	Narcy	
2016–2020	Home Sweetie Home	Rafael "Boss Paeng" Samonte	
2016	Born for You	Desmond	
2018	The Blood Sisters	Bruce	
2019–2020	Sandugo	Hugoberto "Hugo" Martinez	
2021	Pinoy Big Brother: Kumunity Season 10	Himself (virtual houseguest)	
2022	PIE Night Long	Himself (guest host)	
2024–2025	Quizmosa	Himself (host)	
2025	Rainbow Rumble	Himself (contestant)	
2026	Blood vs Duty		

=== Music Videos ===
Year	Title	Role
2026	Unang Kilig (with Bini)	Himself

=== Radio ===
- Wow ang Showbiz (DZXL/DWIZ); 2005
- OMJ! (DZMM); 2013–2020
