= Rubberman (film) =

Philippine superhero film

- Directed by: Edgardo "Boy" Vinarao
- Screenplay by: Cris Pablo
- Story by: Michael V.
- Produced by: Orly R. Ilacad
- Starring: Michael V.
- Cinematography: Jun Perreira
- Edited by: Edgardo "Boy" Vinarao
- Music by: Jessie Lasaten
- Production companies: OctoArts Films; Cinemax Studios
- Distributed by: OctoArts Films
- Release date: December 25, 1996
- Running time: 90 minutes
- Country: Philippines
- Languages: Filipino; English

Rubberman is a 1996 Filipino superhero comedy film edited and directed by Edgardo "Boy" Vinarao. The film stars Michael V., who wrote the story, in the title role. It was one of the entries in the 1996 Metro Manila Film Festival.

== Cast ==
Main cast

- Michael V. as Bitoy/Rubberman
- Beth Tamayo as Jessica
  - Princess Ann Schuck as Little Jessica
- Gloria Romero as Madam Rita
- Dick Israel as Val Balbin/Mandreko
- Roy Alvarez as Yoyoy
- Allan K. as Baldo
- Bomber Moran as Bobo
- Archie Adamos as Video Guy
- Nathan Torres as Henry
- Tootsie Guevara as Carissa
- Tonee Arao as Tonee
- Randel Gayoso as Jeff
- Dina Cementina as Carnival Manager
- Emman Abeleda as Younger Brother

Guest cast

- Ian Veneracion as Policeman
- Jennifer Mendoza as TV Reporter
- Lara Morena as Roller Blade Girl
- Jun Limpot as himself
- Vergel Meneses as herself
- Aster Amoyo as herself
