= Movie Magazine =

Philippine television talk show

- Title card
- Also known as: Movie Patrol
- Genre: Talk show
- Presented by: Cristy Fermin; Nap Gutierrez; Lulubelle Lam; Jun Nardo; Eugene Asis; Dolly Anne Carvajal; Mario Hernando
- Country of origin: Philippines
- Original languages: Tagalog; English

Production
- Camera setup: Multiple-camera setup
- Running time: 60 minutes
- Production companies: LOCA-LOBO Productions; GMA Entertainment TV

Original release
- Network: GMA Network
- Release: February 28, 1987 – September 23, 1995

Movie Magazine, formerly titled as Movie Patrol, is a Philippine television showbiz-oriented talk show broadcast by GMA Network. It premiered on February 28, 1987. The show concluded on September 23, 1995.

== Hosts ==
- Cristy Fermin (1987–94)
- Nap Gutierrez (1987–93)
- Lulubelle Lam (1987–89)
- Jun Nardo (1993–95)
- Dolly Anne Carvajal (1993–95)
- Eugene Asis (1994–95)

Film reviewer

- Mario Hernando (1987-95)

Reporters

- Rey Pumaloy
- Lhar Santiago
