= Call Center Girl =

- Theatrical movie poster
- Directed by: Don Cuaresma
- Screenplay by: Kriz Gazmen; Hyro Aguinaldo; Enrico Santos
- Story by: Enrico Santos
- Produced by: Charo Santos-Concio; Malou N. Santos
- Starring: Pokwang; Jessy Mendiola; Enchong Dee
- Cinematography: Charlie Peralta
- Edited by: Beng Bandong
- Music by: Vincent de Jesus
- Production companies: Star Cinema; Skylight Films
- Distributed by: Star Cinema
- Release date: November 27, 2013
- Running time: 107 minutes
- Country: Philippines
- Language: Filipino
- Box office: ₱50,105,891.00

Call Center Girl is a 2013 Filipino family comedy drama film directed by Don Cuaresma, starring Pokwang, Jessy Mendiola, and Enchong Dee. The film is produced by Skylight Films and Star Cinema. It premiered on November 27, 2013, as part of Star Cinema's 20th Anniversary presentation.

The film also marks as Pokwang's 11th film under Star Cinema.

== Cast ==
=== Main cast ===
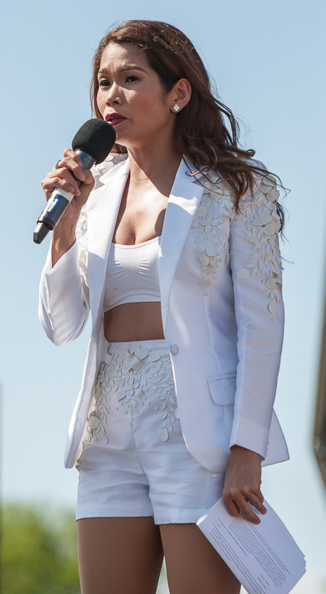
Pokwang portrays Teresa "Terry" Manlapat.

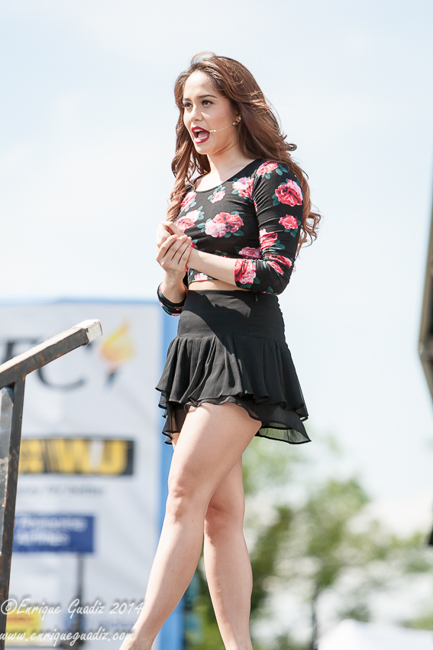
Jessy Mendiola portrays Regina "Reg" Manlapat.

- Pokwang as Teresa "Terry" Manlapat
- Jessy Mendiola as Regina "Reg" Manlapat
- Enchong Dee as Vince Sandoval

=== Supporting cast ===
- K Brosas as Lolay
- John Lapus as Ritchie
- Alex Castro as Martin
- Ogie Diaz as Midang
- Ejay Falcon as Dennis Demenes
- Arron Villaflor as Perry Manlapat
- Dianne Medina as Claire Manlapat
- Dawn Jimenez as Lea

=== Special Participation ===
- Jestoni Alarcon as Raul Manlapat
- Jayson Gainza as Vendor
- Pooh as Interviewer
- Chokoleit† as Trainer Chokie
- Tado Jimenez† as Security Guard
- Cheridel Alejandrino as Elevator Girl
