= Doubt (2003 film) =

Duda Doubt
- DVD Cover
- Directed by: Crisaldo Pablo
- Written by: Crisaldo Pablo
- Produced by: Clarence Tan America
- Starring: Andoy Ranay; Pablo Gabriel
- Release date: 2003
- Running time: 90 minutes
- Country: Philippines
- Language: Tagalog

Doubt (Tagalog: Duda) is a 2003 Filipino film about fidelity and deception in a gay relationship. Cris, a young director, meets Erick and develops a relationship with him. After being together for several months, their relationship began to fall apart and is complicated by other people getting involved in their lives.

== Cast ==
- Andoy Ranay as Cris
- Paulo Gabriel as Erick
- Larry Burns
- John Lapus
- Jojo Nones
- Rey Pumaloy
