= John Lapus =

Filipino actor, host, and comedian (born 1973)

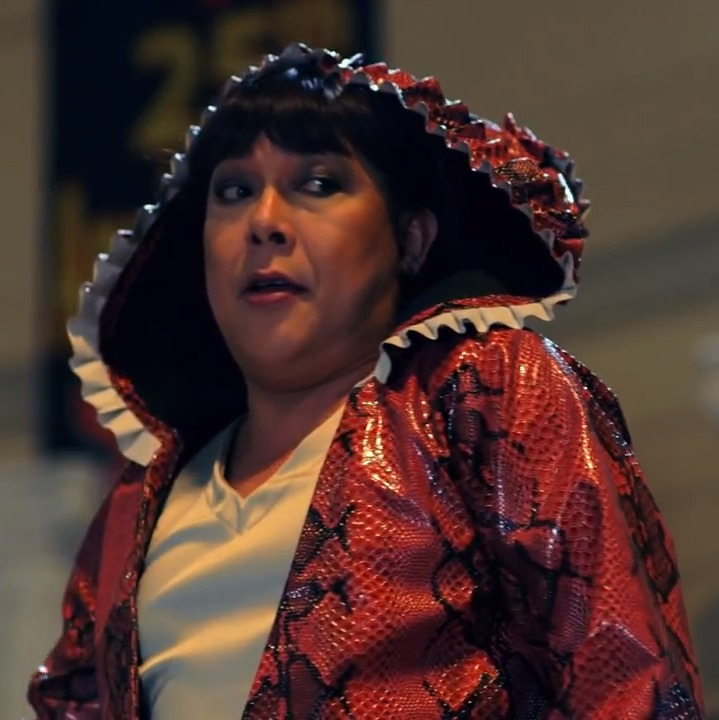
- Lapus as "Iggy" in Shake, Rattle & Roll XV
- Born: Jonathan Anthony Solis Lapus; July 7, 1973 (age 53); Quezon City, Rizal, Philippines
- Other name: Sweet
- Education: University of Santo Tomas (BS)
- Occupations: Host; actor; comedian; director
- Years active: 1993–present
- Agents: Star Magic (1993–present); Ricky Gallardo for GMA projects (2006–2013)
- Father: Jojo Lapus

Jonathan Anthony Solis Lapus (born July 7, 1973), also known as Sweet, is a Filipino actor, presenter and director. He began his career performing several stage plays and later branched into acting on screen. He became one of the leading queer comedians in the 2000s to mid 2010s, appearing in numerous blockbusters, presented several television shows, and later expanded into filmmaking in late 2010s. Lapus is the recipient of two Aliw Awards, two Box Office Entertainment Awards, two Golden Screen Awards and a Star Award for Television.

== Early life and education ==
John Lapus is the son of showbiz columnist Jojo Lapus. The elder Lapus has been estranged from his son since the former was eleven years old.

Lapus attended the University of Santo Tomas (UST) in Manila where he obtained a degree in hotel and restaurant management in 1993. At UST he was part of Teatro Tomasino. He planned to shift to nursing or physical therapy but abandoned such move due to financial constraints.

== Career ==
Lapus started his professional career in television in 1993 when he was hired as a researcher for ABS-CBN. He would become a segment producer around the following year and would start making appearances in sitcoms.

He worked as a researcher of ABS-CBN's Showbiz Lingo. He appeared in numerous ABS-CBN shows and often moonlighted as a Creative Consultant for the network's film arm, Star Cinema. His nickname "Sweet" was named after his character in the sitcom Arriba, Arriba!. In 2006, he transferred to joining S-Files after his assignments at ABS-CBN dwindled. When S-Files was cancelled by the network he was named main host of Showbiz Central together with Pia Guanio and Raymond Gutierrez. Since then, his career has experienced resurgence. Lapus won two awards namely, Best Male Stand-Up Comic in Aliw Awards 2006 and Best Game Show Host (along with Ai-Ai delas Alas) for ABC-5 (now TV5)'s Sing Galing in PMPC Star Awards 2004.

Lapus is openly gay. He returned to his original home network ABS-CBN but in 2012, he was still on GMA Network for joining the cast of Makapiling Kang Muli. He had been cast first at Ikaw ay Pag-Ibig, Kahit Konting Pagtingin and now at Mirabella which he was known as the foster father Paeng Robles.

== Acting credits ==
=== Film ===
Year	Title	Role
1994	Bala at Lipstik	
1996	Ang TV Movie: The Adarna Adventure	Court Jester
1997	Wanted: Perfect Mother	Tootsie
1997	Kiliti	
1997	Flames: The Movie	Stage Director
1997	Ang Pulubi at Ang Princesa	Roda
1998	Kung Ayaw Mo, Huwag Mo	Badang
1998	Muling Ibalik ang Tamis ng Pag-ibig	Gay Prostitute
1999	Dito sa Puso Ko	Jackie
1999	Ang Kabit ni Mrs. Montero	Zorro
2000	Pedrong Palad	Monakiki
2000	Anak	Sing-along Bar Host 1
2000	Kailangan Ko'y Ikaw	Sweet
2001	Buhay Kamao	Badong
2001	Ano Bang Meron Ka	Jackie
2002	Mahal Kita, Final Answer	Jimboy
2002	Kung Ikaw Ay Isang Panaginip	Sugar
2003	Pangarap Ko Ang Ibigin Ka	
2003	My First Romance	Tiger
2003	Doubt	
2004	Masikip sa Dibdib	Bogs
2005	Bathhouse	Lloyd
2005	Bahay ni Lola 2	Richie
2006	Lambanog	Rico
2006	Binibining K	Rommel
2006	Oh My Ghost!	Doctor Lapuz
2007	Agent X44	Vaklava
2007	Ang Cute ng Ina Mo	Junjun
2007	Apat Dapat, Dapat Apat: Friends 4 Lyf and Death	Sugar
2007	Pasukob	Municipal Board / Clerk / Mayor
2007	Shake, Rattle and Roll 9	Sanny
2008	Ikaw Pa Rin: Bongga Ka Boy	Stef
2008	100	Host
2008	Loving You	Erich
2008	Shake, Rattle & Roll X	Julius
2008	Ang Manghuhula	
2009	Manila	
2009	Oh, My Girl!: A Laugh Story...	John Lapus
2009	Shake, Rattle & Roll XI	Basti
2009	Ang Panday	Kruma
2010	Here Comes the Bride	Toffee
2010	Mamarazzi	Mandy Gonzales
2010	Petrang Kabayo	Mrs. Woo
2010	Astro Mayabang	Mama Suk
2010	Super Inday and the Golden Bibe	Golden Bibe
2010	Shake, Rattle and Roll 12	Malay
2011	My Valentine Girls	Korean Male Soldier
2011	Who's That Girl	Bert
2011	Becky	Becky
2011	Temptation Island	Joshua
2011	Won't Last a Day Without You	DJ Ram
2012	Moron 5 and the Crying Lady	Beckie Pamintuan
2012	The Mommy Returns	Diyoga
2012	Kimmy Dora and the Temple of Kiyeme	Reception Host
2012	Posas	Complainant
2012	I Do Bidoo Bidoo: Heto nAPO Sila!	Karaoke host
2012	Of All the Things	Rocky
2012	24/7 in Love	Chang
2012	Mariposa: Sa Hawla ng Gabi	Cleo
2012	Si Agimat, si Enteng Kabisote at si Ako	Tita Che/Pink Hulk
2013	Must Be... Love	Baby Martinez
2013	Ang Huling Henya	Guest at Club Ramp
2013	Call Center Girl	Ritchie
2013	Kimmy Dora: Ang Kiyemeng Prequel	Homeless Person
2013	Boy Golden: Shoot to Kill	Bar Manager
2014	Da Possessed	Kemerut
2014	Moron 5.2: The Transformation	Beckie
2014	Shake, Rattle & Roll XV	Iggy Moda
2015	Unlike Father, Unlike Son	JC, The Designer
2015	Resureksyon	Tito Baby
2015	Buy Now, Die Later	Pippa
2016	Echorsis	Kristoff De Villa
2016	Working Beks	Gorgeous
2018	Ang Babaeng Allergic sa WiFi	Alex
2018	Abay Babes	Boutique Owner
2018	Kasal	Anton
2019	Ang Babae sa Septic Tank 3: The Real Untold Story of Josephine Bracken	Celebrity Host
2021	Barumbadings	Queenpin
2021	Love is Color Blind	Tita Vicky
2023	Beks Days of Our Lives	Mang Romy
2024	Road Trip	Michael
2024	Un/Happy for You	JP
2025	Call Me Mother	Mama M de Guzman

=== Television ===
- Showbiz Lingo (1992–1999)
- Cristy Per Minute (1995–1999)
- Marinella (1999–2001)
- The Buzz (1999–2005)
- Arriba, Arriba! (2000–2001)
- Bituin (2002–2003)
- Pinoy Big Brother: Eto na si Kuya! (Housemate)
- Blind Item
- Sing Galing!
- S-Files (2006–2007)
- Captain Barbell - Marlon "Mercy"/Mercurio (2006)
- Showbiz Central (2007–2012) – Co-Host
- MariMar (2007–2008)
- Ako si Kim Samsoon (2008)
- Obra (2008)
- Luna Mystika (2008–2009) – Karya
- Adik Sa'Yo (2009) – July
- Show Me Da Manny – Nicholas/Nicole (2009)
- Talentadong Pinoy – (2009) – Guest Judge
- Shall We Dance – (2009)
- Full House – Chicky (2009)
- Startalk – (2010) - Guest co-host
- Pilyang Kerubin – (2010) – Aroo
- Bantatay – (2010) – Sweet (voice)
- Banana Split – Guest star (2010)
- Gandang Gabi, Vice! (2011)
- Regal Shocker – (2011)
- Ikaw ay Pag-Ibig – Max (2012)
- Wansapanataym: Ilog – Nanding (2012)
- Makapiling Kang Muli – George (2012)
- Kahit Konting Pagtingin – Milo (2013)
- Kris TV (2013)
- Wansapanataym: My Fairy Kasambahay (2013)
- Wansapanataym: Si Lulu At Si Lily Liit - Sunshine (2014)
- Mirabella - Rafael 'Paeng' Amarillo (2014)
- Ipaglaban Mo: Ang Aking Bagong Pagkatao - Michael/Michelle (2015)
- Mac and Chiz - Mamu Chok (2015)
- Korek Ka, John! (2015)
- Doble Kara - Itoy Delgado (2015-2017)
- Wansapanataym: Annika Pintasera - Ponching (2017)
- The Lolas' Beautiful Show - Guest (2017)
- The Blood Sisters as Odet - A Neighbor in Baguio (2018)
- Since I Found You as Kap. Watashi Cobarrubias (2018)
- Bawal na Game Show as Himself / Contestant (2020)
- Paano ang Pangako? as Manang Kitty (2020-2021)
- How to Move On in 30 Days (2022)
- Daddy's Gurl (2022)
- Rainbow Rumble as Himself / Contestant (2025)
- Sigabo (2026) as Mama Franny

=== Director ===
- Wansapanataym
- Kadenang Ginto (2019–2020)
- Ipaglaban Mo (2019)
- Maalaala Mo Kaya (2019)
- BalitaOneNan (2022)
- Jose & Maria's Bonggang Villa (2022)

== Accolades ==
Awards and nominations received by John Lapus
Award (Note: Awards, festivals, honors and other miscellaneous organizations are listed in alphabetical order.)	Year (Note: Indicates the year of ceremony. Each year is linked to the article about the awards held that year, wherever possible.)	Recipient(s)	Category	Result	Ref.
Aliw Awards	2005	John Lapus	Best Male Stand-Up Comedy Act	Won	
Aliw Awards	2008	John Lapus	Best Male Stand-Up Comedy Act	Won	
Box Office Entertainment Awards	2011	Here Comes the Bride	Comedy Actor of the Year	Won	
Box Office Entertainment Awards	2012	Temptation Island	Comedy Actor of the Year	Won	
Cinema One Originals Digital Film Festival	2018	Pang MMK	Best Director	Nominated	
Cinema One Originals Digital Film Festival	2018	Pang MMK	Best Picture	Nominated	
Golden Screen Awards	2010	Show Me Da Manny	Best Comedy Actor for Television	Won	
Golden Screen Awards	2011	Here Comes the Bride	Best Actor in Comedy or Musical	Won	
Golden Screen Awards	2013	Makapiling Kang Muli	Outstanding Supporting Actor in a Drama Series	Nominated	
Golden Screen Awards	2013	Showbiz Central	Outstanding Male Showbiz Talk Program Host	Nominated	
Star Awards for Television	2004	Sing Galing!	Best Game Show Host	Won	
Star Awards for Television	2006	Blind Item	Best Game Show Host	Nominated	
Star Awards for Television	2007	S-Files	Best Male Showbiz-Oriented Talk Show Host	Nominated	
