= Jeepney Jackpot: Pera o Para! =

2013 Philippine television game show

- Genre: Game show
- Created by: Associated Broadcasting Company
- Written by: Jamryll Gonato; Chris Osia; Paolo Martin Valconchia
- Directed by: Raymond Generoso
- Presented by: Mr. Fu; Valeen Montenegro; Saida Diola; Andres
- Country of origin: Philippines
- Original language: Filipino
- No. of episodes: 63

Production
- Executive producer: Menans Perez
- Running time: 30 minutes

Original release
- Network: TV5
- Release: January 7 – April 5, 2013

Jeepney Jackpot: Pera o Para! (English: Jeepney Jackpot: Money or Leave) is a Philippine television game show broadcast by TV5. Hosted by Mr. Fu, Valeen Montenegro, Saida Diola and Andres, it aired from January 7 to April 5, 2013, replacing Sharon: Kasama Mo, Kapatid.

== Main hosts ==
- Mr. Fu
- Valeen Montenegro
- Saida Diola
- Andres

== See also ==
- List of TV5 (Philippine TV network) original programming
