= Living It Up (Philippine TV program) =

Philippine television infotainment show

- Title card
- Genre: Infotainment
- Presented by: Raymond Gutierrez; Tim Yap; Issa Litton; Sam Oh; Gabby dela Merced
- Country of origin: Philippines

Production
- Producer: Wilma Galvante
- Running time: 42 minutes
- Production company: GMA Entertainment TV

Original release
- Network: Q
- Release: March 2007 – February 2009

Living It Up! is a Philippine television infotainment show broadcast by Q. Hosted by Raymond Gutierrez, Tim Yap, Issa Litton and Sam Oh, it premiered in March 2007. The show concluded in February 2009.

== Hosts ==
- Raymond Gutierrez
- Tim Yap
- Issa Litton
- Sam Oh

== Accolades ==
Accolades received by Living It Up
Year	Award	Category	Recipient	Result	Ref.
2007	21st PMPC Star Awards for Television	Best Lifestyle Show	Living It Up	Nominated	
2007	21st PMPC Star Awards for Television	Best Lifestyle Show Hosts	Raymond Gutierrez, Tim Yap, Issa Litton	Won	
2008	22nd PMPC Star Awards for Television	Best Lifestyle Show	Living It Up	Won	
2008	22nd PMPC Star Awards for Television	Best Lifestyle Show Hosts	Raymond Gutierrez, Tim Yap, Issa Litton	Won	
