= Aster Amoyo =

Filipino television host and publicist

- Born: Asteria Amosco Amoyo; May 10, 1956 (age 70); Borongan, Eastern Samar, Philippines
- Occupations: television host talent manager publicist newspaper columnist entrepreneur
- Years active: 1974–present
- Partner: Ernesto Reyes (separated)
- Children: Aila Marie Amoyo Reyes - Cristobal
- Website: Aster Amoyo (@asteramoyo)

Aster Amoyo (born Asteria; May 10, 1956) is a Filipino television host, entertainment writer and talent manager. She currently hosts a YouTube channel TicTalk with Aster Amoyo. She has interviewed president Bongbong Marcos and First-lady Liza Araneta-Marcos.

== Biography ==
=== Early life ===
Amoyo was born on May 10, 1956, in Borongan, Eastern Samar, Philippines, to Bonifacio Amoyo and Maria Salome Amosco. Her parents were both widowed young, having children of their former marriages, before they got together and had children with Aster and her siblings, Meriam and Mario. She finished her high school studies in Eastern Samar and went to Manila afterwards, having taken a two-year secretarial course which led her to her showbiz career.

=== Career ===
In 1974, she was taken in as secretary of veteran Public Relations specialist and talent manager Norma Japitana at Vicor Music Corporation. When the recording company moved its office to Aurora Boulevard in Cubao in 1976, she got promoted as Public Relations Assistant. Joining Orly Ilacad, Amoyo formed the OctoArts International in January 1978. Under the said recording company, she helped managed the careers of some of Philippines' pop icons like Eva Eugenio, Boyfriends, Cristy Mendoza, and Imelda Papin. In the 1980s, the recording company spawned the careers of other Filipino singers such as Pops Fernandez, Jamie Rivera, Joey Albert, Francis Magalona, Michael V., and Ogie Alcasid.

When Ilacad branched out into movie production and built OctoArts Films, Amoyo was selected to spearhead the advertising and media promotions. Inside the production company, she helped managed the careers of celebrated stars like Jeric Raval, Lara Morena, Mikee Villanueva, Shirley Fuentes and Jennifer Mendoza. She wrote for different popular showbiz magazines like Liwayway, Movie Flash, Kislap, and others.

Her career in television hosting started in 1992 with showbiz-oriented talk show Isang Tanong, Isang Sagot together with Anselle Beluso. In 1996, GMA Network tapped her services to host Inside Showbiz.

Alongside her career in entertainment, Amoyo built a successful corporate career. In 1997, she founded Pilipinas International Marketing Services, Inc. (PIMSI), later renamed Key Square, Inc., starting with only a small team and growing the company significantly under her leadership until her retirement.

After her tenure with OctoArts ended in December 1999, Amoyo focused on building and expanding businesses in the Philippines with her good Japanese friend, Koji Miyashita. Together, they helped grow the Philippine operations of IPS, Inc. and were also involved in ventures including 瞬 Toki. Their work also contributed to bringing GMA Network to overseas Filipino audiences through Pinoy TV, beginning with its expansion in Japan, and the Shinagawa Aesthetic and Lasik Clinic to the Philippines. Amoyo also started a free newspaper for the Filipinos in Japan called Pinoy Gazette in the 90s until early 2000s.

Despite her corporate responsibilities, entertainment remained central to Amoyo’s career. She also founded Global Publishing Entertainment Corporation, publisher of entertainment and lifestyle magazines including S Magazine, Inside Showbiz, and Celebrity Living, which became notable publications in the Philippine entertainment market.

In 2012, Amoyo became one of the segment hosts of the late night variety show Walang Tulugan with the Master Showman until its conclusion in 2016, after the passing of its host, German Moreno.

Member of the Philippine Artists Managers, Inc (PAMI), she served as talent manager for Viva Films actors and actresses such as Jay Manalo, Cristina Gonzales, Jao Mapa, Alonzo Muhlach, Kier Legaspi, Rey Abellana, among others. She currently hosts a YouTube channel entitled TicTalk with Aster Amoyo.

She became known for her work on Rubberman (1996) as guest actor, Wag na wag kang lalayo (1996) and Sanggano (1997) both in charge of its publicity and promotions.

=== John Regala Incident ===
Amoyo, together with Nadia Montenegro and Chuckie Dreyfus, helped raise funds together for the film actor John Regala who was suffering from liver cirrhosis. When Regala claimed that he never received a single amount from the fundraising efforts, Amoyo reacted to his statement and accused the actor of lying.

=== Personal life ===
Aster Amoyo was married to Ernesto Reyes with whom she had a daughter, Aila Marie . They eventually got separated.

She is a Roman Catholic.

== Filmography ==
=== Television ===
Year	Show	Role
1993	Isang Tanong, Isang Sagot	Host
1996	Inside Showbiz	Host
1997-1999	Showbiz Lingo	Segment host
2012-2016	Walang Tulugan with the Master Showman	Segment host

=== Film ===
Year	Title	Role
1991	Kalabang Mortal ni Baby Ama	publicist
1992	Totoy Buang: Mad Killer ng Maynila	publicity & promotions
1992	Ali in Wonderland	publicity & promotions
1993	Because I Love You	publicity & promotions
1994	Si Ayala at si Zobel	publicity & promotions
1994	Loretta	Elvira Galchitonera/publicity & promotions
1994	Biboy Banal: Pagganti ko tapos kayo	publicity & promotions
1995	Barkada walang atrasan	publicity & promotions
1996	Rubberman	herself/ publicity & promotions
1996	Wag na wag kang lalayo	publicity & promotions
1997	Sanggano	publicity & promotions
1997	Lab en Kisses	publicity & promotions
1999	Bakit Pa?	publicity & promotions
1999	Pepeng Agimat	publicity & promotions
2000	Palaban	publicity & promotions
2000	Col. Elmer Jamias: Barako ng Maynila	publicity & promotions
2000	Minsan ko lang sasabihin	publicity & promotions
2000	Ping Lacson: Super Cop	publicity & promotions
2001	Luv Text	publicity & promotions
2003	Lastikman	publicity & promotions
2003	Malikmata	publicity & promotions
2003	Fantastic Man	publicity & promotions
2009	Ang Darling Kong Aswang	publicity & promotions
2011	Tunay Na Buhay	herself
2016	Enteng Kabisote 10 and the Abangers	publicity & promotions
2017	Meant to Beh	publicity & promotions
