= Sam Oh =

Filipino broadcaster (born 1980)

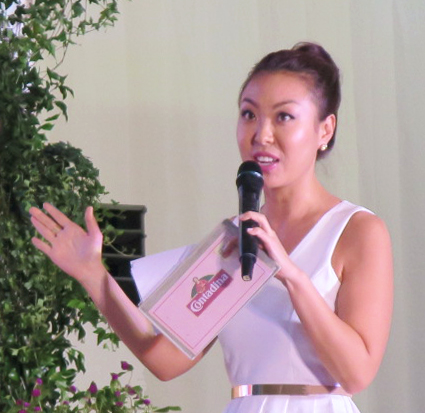
- Sam Oh in September 2016
- Born: January 15, 1980 (age 46); Suwon, South Korea
- Occupations: Television host; radio personality; lifestyle columnist

Korean name
- Hangul: 오상미
- RR: O Sangmi
- MR: O Sangmi

Oh Sang-mi, better known as Sam Oh is a South Korean television host, radio broadcaster. A Korean expatriate who has been living in the Philippines for 20 years. She can speak Filipino and English in addition to her native Korean. She has been the main hostess of Rated Oh! on Solar Entertainment's ETC cable channel for eight seasons and a columnist of The Manila Times.

Oh landed the job on ETC through an audition, which was turned into a reality show.

She had a morning radio show on 99.5 Hit FM (now 99.5 Play FM) entitled Sam Vs Sam with former co-host Sam YG (until Sam YG was suspended by management which led to his eventual transfer to Magic 89.9 in July 2007). By September, she was part of its replacement, The HiT Morning Crew, along with the Flushmasters Sonny B & Bennii and newsgirl Christina (previously with Robi the Rascal and Boytoy Chevy Chase). That show lasted until she decided to leave radio for good to concentrate on her new television show Living It Up on Q. (Such timing occurred when Hit was about to rebrand to Campus 99.5 in March 2008.) Oh has also posed for FHM Philippines as part of "The Girls of FHM" in its September 2006 issue.

Sam Oh appears on her show, Modern Girls with Denise Laurel and Gretchen Ho on Lifestyle TV Philippines. She was heard on Disturbing the Peace with Gibb on 99.5 RT and is currently a co-host on Good Times with Mo on Magic 89.9, along with Mo Twister, Alex Calleja, and Karylle, returning after retiring on April 19, 2018.

== TV shows ==
- Rated Oh! (ETC)
- Living It Up (Q)
- True Confections (Q)
- Events, Inc. (Q)
- Sarap at Home (Q)
- Delicioso (Q)
- Unang Hirit (GMA 7)
- Aha! (GMA 7)
- Eat Bulaga! (GMA 7)
- Sarap to Heart (GMA News TV)
- Sarap Diva (GMA 7)
- Modern Girls (Lifestyle TV PH)

== Awards ==
- Winner, Best Lifestyle Show Hosts for Living It Up (with Tim Yap, Issa Litton, and Raymond Gutierrez) - 19th PMPC Star Awards for Television
- Winner, Best Lifestyle Show Hosts for Events, Inc. (with Tim Yap) - 20th PMPC Star Awards for Television

== See also ==
- Grace Lee
