= Tim Yap =

Filipino TV and radio host

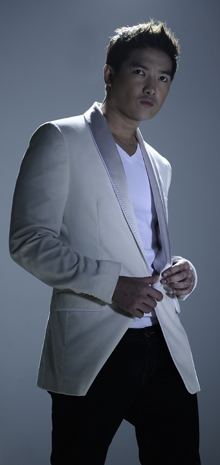
- Born: January 17, 1977 (age 49); Metro Manila, Philippines
- Citizenship: Philippines
- Education: De La Salle University; Asian Institute of Management
- Alma mater: De La Salle University
- Occupations: TV host, entrepreneur, columnist, club owner.
- Years active: 1999–present
- Television: Celebrity Duets: Philippine Edition, Tweetbiz Insiders, Party Pilipinas, Events Inc., Living It Up, The Tim Yap Show
- Height: 5 ft 10 in (178 cm)
- Awards: Best Lifestyle Show Host - 2007 & 2008 PMPC Star Awards for TV (for Living It Up); Best Lifestyle Show Host - 2009 PMPC Star Awards for TV (for Events Inc.); Most Stylish Male Host - 2010 StarStudio Celebrity Style Awards; Outstanding Young Filipino in Entrepreneurship - 2013 Gawad Amerika Awards

Timothy Brian Yap (born January 17, 1977) is a Filipino TV and radio host, actor, newspaper editor, creative director, and columnist from Manila, Philippines. He also owns several clubs in the Philippines. He currently hosts The Tim Yap Show which airs weeknights on GMA Network, edits a pop culture section of The Philippine Star entitled "Supreme", and hosted the morning radio talk show The Playground on 99.5 PLAYFM.

== Early life and career ==
Tim Yap was the youngest of seven kids. While attending high school at Saint Jude Catholic School, he won the lead role in Lost in Yonkers, which marked the 25th anniversary of the Repertory Philippines, but his parents and his school didn't allow him to go, so he attended rehearsals in secret, informing the school security guard that he had the permission of his teacher and principal to leave school. "My parents had no clue that I was going to Repertory," he said. "All along they thought that I was just attending a rehearsal for a school play until they read about it in the newspapers." After several roles for young characters, Yap continued on as a production intern for repertory plays just to be involved. He eventually evolved into an events producer, which led him to be sought after to handle product launches and fashion shows.

Yap graduated from De La Salle University with a bachelor's degree in marketing, and later on received his master's degree in entrepreneurship from the Asian Institute of Management. He edited the "Super" section of the Philippine Daily Inquirer, and then left the Inquirer to start the "Supreme" section of the Philippine Star.

Tim Yap hosted the Metro Manila Film Festival Awards in 2010 and 2011. He hosted Miss World Philippines in 2011.

On January 21, 2013, The Tim Yap Show premiered on GMA Network, with Yap as the host of the self-titled celebrity talk show. It is currently in its third season, which premiered Oct. 28, 2013. Aside from television appearances, he hosted the morning radio talk The Playground on 99.5 PLAYFM with Sam Oh and Nikko Ramos.

== Awards ==
In 2007 and 2008, he received the PMPC Star Awards for TV Best Lifestyle Show Hosts award with Raymond Gutierrez and Issa Litton for Living It Up. In 2009, he also won the same award but with co-host Sam Oh for Events Inc.. His show has also won "Best Lifestyle Show" for three consecutive years at the PMPC Star Awards. In 2010, he won Most Stylish Male Host at the StarStudio Celebrity Style Awards. In 2013, he was awarded Outstanding Young Filipino in Entrepreneurship by Gawad Amerika.

== Advocacy ==
Since 2008, Yap has been an active supporter of the Virlaine Foundation, a non-government organization engaged in helping street children. In 2011, he spearheaded the Rice Up for Street Children campaign after having been named as the foundation's Ambassador of Goodwill.

== Personal life ==
Yap proposed to long-time boyfriend Javi Martinez Pardo during his 40th birthday on January 19, 2017. The couple got married on December 25, 2017, at The Peninsula New York with Lea Salonga among the witnesses. On Instagram post dated January 4, 2023, Tim wrote “Married…again,” having shared a photo of himself and Javi by the famed Amanpulo beach.

On April 8, 2024, in Instagram post, Yap said he met American actress Angelina Jolie, which while watching The Outsiders musical at the Bernard B. Jacobs Theatre. "Oh hi there Miss Jolie! Congratulations on producing the show!” Yap greeted Jolie.

== Filmography ==
=== Film ===
Year	Title	Role	Notes
2003	Anghel sa Lupa	Raphael	
2004	Mano Po III: My Love	Chinese opera director	Official entry to the 30th Metro Manila Film Festival
2005	Bikini Open	Talent manager	
2009	Lola	Himself	International title: Grandmother; Opening film at the Venice Film Festival
2009	Mano Po 6: A Mother's Love	Himself	Official entry to the 35th Metro Manila Film Festival
2011	Joey Gosiengfiao's Temptation Island	Himself	
2011	Tween Academy: Class of 2012	Himself	
2011	Yesterday, Today, Tomorrow	Himself	
2012	Boy Pick-Up: The Movie		Cameo
2012	A Secret Affair	Tim	
2012	Sosy Problems: It Girls Just Wanna Have Fun	Jamie Yap	Official entry to the 37th Metro Manila Film Festival
2013	The Bride and the Lover	Himself	

=== Television ===
Year	Title	Role
1999	The Buzz	Himself (host)
2004	MTV Supahstar: The Supahsearch	Himself (judge)
2004	Wazzup Wazzup	Himself (host)
2005	Club TV	Himself (host)
2005	Glam: The Smart Gold 2005 Red Carpet Special	Himself (host)
2007	Celebrity Duets: Philippine Edition	Himself (contestant)
2007–2009	Living It Up	Himself (host)
2009	Project Runway Philippines	Himself (guest judge)
2009	Events Incorporated	Himself (host)
2009-2011	Tweetbiz Insiders	Himself (Tweetmoso-in-Chief / main host)
2010	V Trends	Himself (host)
2011	Pepito Manaloto	Himself (guest)
2010-2013	Party Pilipinas	Himself (host)
2012	Legacy	Justin
2012	Startalk	Himself (host)
2012	2012 Metro Manila Film Festival	Himself (presenter)
2013–2015	The Tim Yap Show	Himself (host)
2020	Love Thy Woman	Timothy "Tim" Go
2022	Start-Up PH	Angelo "Mr. A" Angeles
2023	Miss Universe Philippines 2023	Himself (backstage correspondent)
2026	Pinoy Big Brother: Celebrity Collab Edition 2.0	Himself (houseguest)
