= Showbiz Police =

- Also known as: Showbiz Police: Una sa Eksena
- Genre: Talk show
- Created by: TV5 Entertainment Group
- Directed by: GB Sampedro
- Presented by: Various
- Country of origin: Philippines
- Original language: Filipino
- No. of episodes: 115

Production
- Executive producer: Nelson Alindogan
- Production locations: TV5 Media Center, Mandaluyong; Various locations (including Fisher Mall, Resorts World Manila)
- Running time: 45 minutes

Original release
- Network: TV5
- Release: September 14, 2013 – June 6, 2014

Related
- Ang Latest (2012–2013)

Showbiz Police: Una sa Eksena is a Philippine television talk show broadcast by TV5. Originally hosted by Raymond Gutierrez, Cristy Fermin, Jose Javier Reyes, Dani Castaño and Lucy Torres-Gomez, it aired from September 14, 2013 to June 6, 2014. Gutierrez, Fermin and Reyes serve as the final hosts.

Launched on September 14, 2013, Showbiz Police: Intriga Under Arrest was one of the 8 newly launched weekend programs under the "Weekend Do It Better" block of the network.

It was later moved to a new timeslot on weekdays from January 20, 2014, at 4:00 pm. The show ended on June 6, 2014.

Showbiz Police title card used from September 14, 2013, to January 18, 2014

== Segments ==
- Insta-grasyon
- Direk's Statement
- Cornered by Cristy
- Trending Alert
- Stylish, Style Less
- Good, Bad, OMG!
- Oh My Gulay
- Blind Item
- Totoo o Promo
- Promptu
- Marfori Exclusive
- Celebrity Face-Off

== Hosts ==
=== Main hosts ===
- Raymond Gutierrez
- Cristy Fermin
- Jose Javier Reyes

=== Co-hosts ===
- Divine Lee
- MJ Marfori
- Shalala

=== Former hosts ===
- Dani Castaño (September–November 2013)
- Lucy Torres-Gomez (September–November 2013)

== Awards ==
- Best Showbiz Oriented Talk Show – 12th Gawad Tanglaw Awards

== See also ==
- TV5
- List of TV5 (Philippine TV network) original programming
- List of Philippine television shows
