= Jose & Maria's Bonggang Villa =

Philippine television sitcom series

- Season 2 title card
- Genre: Sitcom
- Created by: Michelle Ngu
- Directed by: John Lapus
- Starring: Dingdong Dantes; Marian Rivera
- Country of origin: Philippines
- Original language: Tagalog
- No. of seasons: 2
- No. of episodes: 26

Production
- Executive producer: Hanzel Vie Calma
- Producers: Jose Sixto G. Dantes III; Marian Rivera; Michael B. Tuviera; Jojo B. Oconer
- Camera setup: Multiple-camera setup
- Running time: 33–39 minutes
- Production companies: GMA Entertainment Group; APT Entertainment; AgostoDos Pictures

Original release
- Network: GMA Network
- Release: May 14, 2022 – March 23, 2024

Jose & Maria's Bonggang Villa (transl. Jose & Maria's extravagant estate) is a Philippine television sitcom series broadcast by GMA Network. Directed by John Lapus, it stars Dingdong Dantes and Marian Rivera both in the title roles. It premiered on May 14, 2022 on the network's Sabado Star Power sa Gabi line up. The series concluded on March 23, 2024, with a total of two seasons and 26 episodes.

The series is streaming online on YouTube.

== Cast and characters ==
Cast

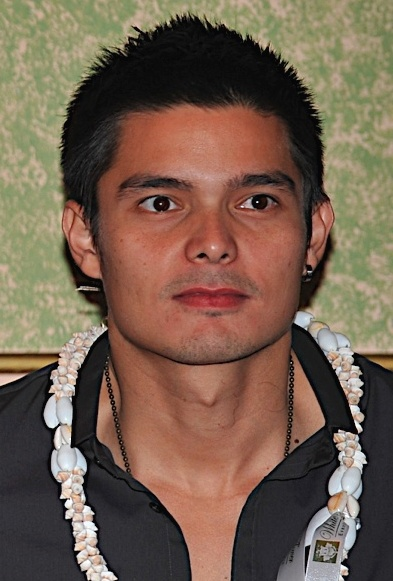
Dingdong Dantes

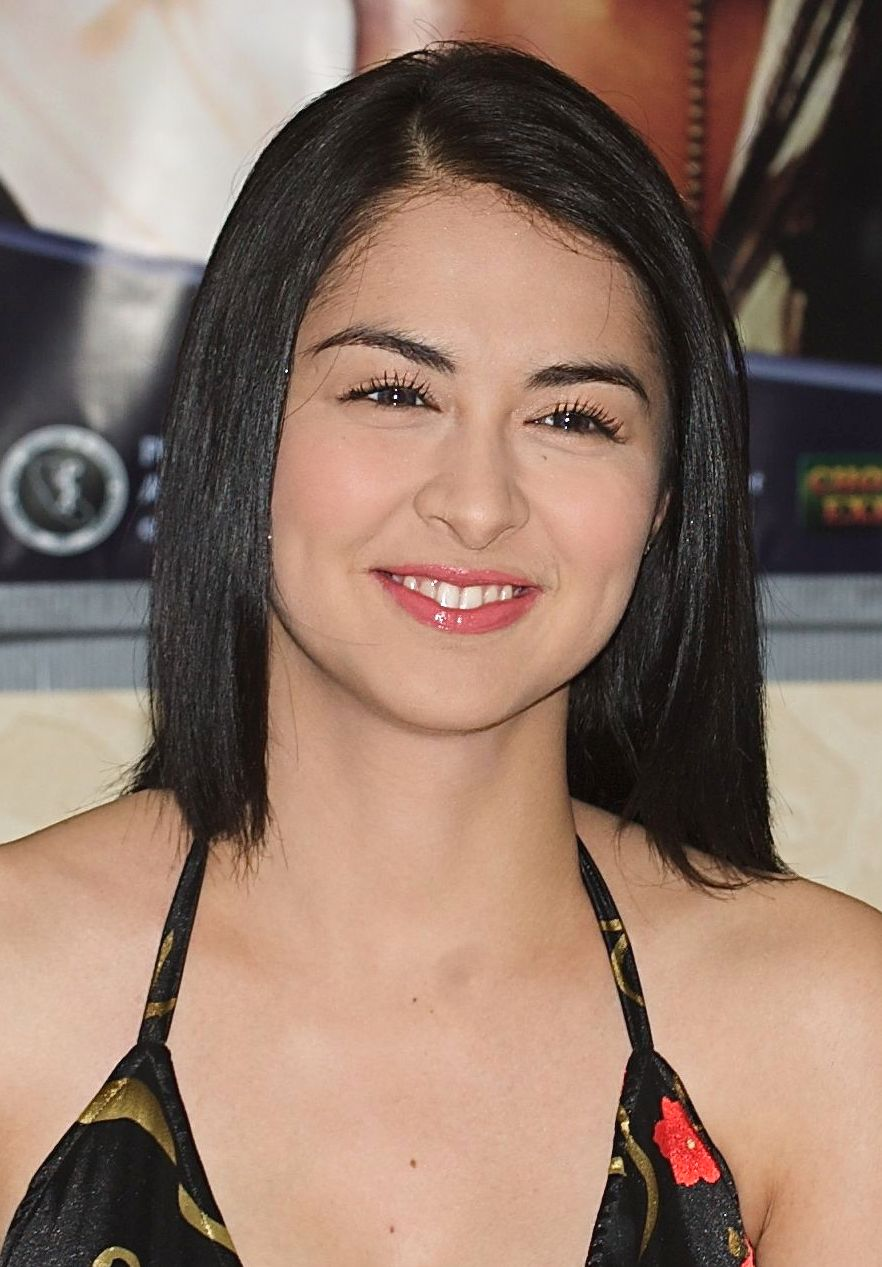
Marian Rivera

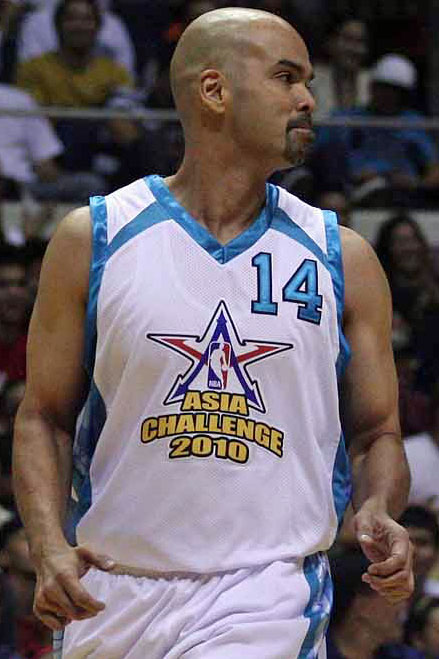
Benjie Paras

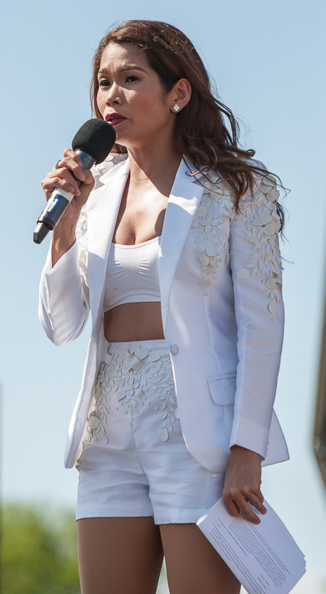
Pokwang

Lead cast

- Dingdong Dantes as Jose Villa
- Marian Rivera as Maria Cabangbang-Villa

Supporting cast

- Zonia Mejia as Mae Cabangbang (season 1)
- Jamir Zabarte as Jae-Z Lopez (season 1)
- Johnny Revilla as Enrique "King" Villa
- Benjie Paras as Rico Nero Cusin
- Pekto as Solomon "Sol" Banayad
- Shamaine Buencamino as Aurora "Mama Au" Cabangbang
- Pinky Amador as Janice Villa (season 2; recurring season 1)
- Hershey Neri as Margarita "Marielou" Cabangbang
- Loujude Gonzalez as Robert "Buboy" Peteza
- Pokwang as Tiffany Hambog (season 2)
- Prince Clemente as Alvin Constancia (season 2)
- Lei Angela as Marissa "Isay" Tayog (season 2)
- Josh Ford as Giovanni "Gio" Wagas (season 2)

== Seasons ==
Season	Episodes	Originally released	
Season	Episodes	First released	Last released
1	16	May 14, 2022	August 27, 2022
2	10	January 20, 2024	March 23, 2024

== Ratings ==
According to AGB Nielsen Philippines' Nationwide Urban Television Audience Measurement People in television homes, the pilot episode of Jose and Maria's Bonggang Villa earned a 13.5% rating.
