= Wow Mali =

1996–2024 Philippine television comedy show

- Title card of Wow Mali: Doble Tama (2023–2024)
- Also known as: Wow Maling Mali (2005–06); Wow Mali Bytes (2007); Wow Mali Express (2007–08); Wow Meganon (2010–11); Wow Mali Pa Rin! (2013–14); Wow Mali! Lakas ng Tama (2014–15); Wow Mali! Doble Tama (2023–24)
- Genre: Comedy
- Created by: TV5 Network, Inc.
- Directed by: Edgar B. Mortiz (1996–98); Ding Bolanos (1998–2008); Robert Quebral (2009–15, 2023–24)
- Presented by: Jose Manalo; Wally Bayola
- Opening theme: "Wow Mali: Doble Tama" Theme
- Country of origin: Philippines
- Original language: Filipino

Production
- Camera setup: Multiple-camera setup
- Running time: 45-60 minutes
- Production companies: TV5 Network; Cignal Entertainment (2023–24); APT Entertainment (2023–24)

Original release
- Network: ABC
- Release: May 19, 1996 – August 2, 2008
- Network: TV5
- Release: February 22, 2009 – June 28, 2015
- Release: August 26, 2023 – October 26, 2024
- Network: RPTV
- Release: February 1 – June 30, 2024

Wow Mali: Doble Tama (transl. Wow Wrong: Double Hit) (formerly Wow Mali, Wow Maling Mali, Wow Mali Bytes, Wow Mali Express, Wow Meganon, Wow Mali Pa Rin! and Wow Mali! Lakas ng Tama) is a Philippine television comedy show broadcast by ABC/TV5. Originally hosted by Joey de Leon, it aired on ABC from May 19, 1996 to August 2, 2008. The show returned to TV5 from February 22, 2009 to June 28, 2015, and again from August 26, 2023 to October 26, 2024. Jose Manalo and Wally Bayola serve as the final hosts. It is the longest-running gag show in the Philippines.

== History ==
The Philippines got its first taste of unpretentious, candidly-captured-for-TV Filipino humor on May 25, 1996, from the reality-based comedy show WoW Mali, hosted by feted comedian Joey de Leon. Inspired by the America's Funniest Home Videos concept, WoW Mali features a plethora of video footage featuring practical jokes, bloopers and wacky segments, as well as solicited but equally hilarious video clips from the viewers. The actual stars of the show are men on the street - individual Filipinos, caught by the candid camera in bizarre and funny situations.

=== Gaining Currency ===
From its pilot episode, the innovative program's candid camera format increasingly gained popularity among viewers of all ages, even paving the way for countless WOW Mali clones that failed to topple the original show. Soon enough, WoW Mali became a household name, even adding a gem to colloquial lingo. "WOW Mali" or "NA-WOW-MALI AKO" is now the common expression whenever one makes a mistake or becomes the victim of a prank or a ruse.

For two years, the show was directed by Edgar "Bobot" Mortiz (a former teen matinee idol and part of the famous Going Bananas gang). Mortiz gave Joey de Leon a comic puppet co-host called Dennis Wrongman (as vivified by mime actor Totong Federez), another original touch. The taping of spiels and vignettes was usually held in the studio while candid shots, gag and tease segments were conducted on the streets by a daily roving crew, with the unsuspecting public as so-called "victims."

In August 1998, Ding Bolanos took over as director and brought Joey de Leon out of the studio to the outdoors. Hence, WoW Mali became a traveling show, capturing the Filipino brand of humor in different parts of the country, amid the colors and flavors of exotic places, exciting resorts and well-traveled tourist spots.

In 2002, the show was taped at the various shopping malls in the Philippines.

=== Wow Maling Mali ===
After almost a decade, ABC reformatted Wow Mali and retitled it Wow Maling Mali which premiered on April 23, 2005. It features the parodies of the several television shows and/or films in each episode. On July 29, 2006, Wow Maling Mali morphed into Teka Mona!, but was discontinued on May 19, 2007.

=== Wow Mali Bytes/Express ===
On May 26, 2007, Wow Mali came back with a new brand, Wow Mali Bytes. It still featured skits and spoofs and gags, but with explicit humor and with no host at all.

On August 4, 2007, it changed its title to Wow Mali Express.

=== Wow Mali spin-offs ===
After the reformat of ABC 5 to TV5, Lokomoko was created which shared the same concept as Wow Mali but focused on school gags. It was hosted by Alex Gonzaga, and Randolf Stamatelaky. When TV5 was reformatted in April 2010, Lokomoko morphed into a gag show similar to Bubble Gang and Tropang Trumpo.

Another comedy gag show on TV5 was Ogags hosted by two Brazilian ladies Daiana Menezes and Ariana Barouk. Ogags ended with the return of Wow Mali.

=== Second revival ===
The show returned on February 22, 2009, on TV5 with Joey de Leon again as host. De Leon hosts the show from a studio similar to a virtual reality studio. It aired on Sundays at 6:30 PM. The show became a separate show from Lokomoko, following the renaming of the show to Lokomoko High.

Changes have been made to the second season of the show. It became live every Sunday night. De Leon interacted with several people in a studio with a barangay plaza as the backdrop. Sexy comedian Alyssa Alano joined him as co-host and had her own segment. Other homegrown TV5 talents like the Baikingu Girls (from the Tuesday primetime show Baikingu) and the Smurfets (from the Wednesday primetime show Ogags) were also seen in the show as well. Richie d' Horsie was added to the cast as Joey's second sidekick.

==== Mahiwagang Tunog ====
Mahiwagang Tunog (Filipino for Mysterious Sound) was a game show incorporated into the new incarnation of Wow Mali. A video clip of someone doing a mundane task was taken, but the video itself was removed, letting the viewers hear only the sound. The host then provided a sentence with the verbs of the sentence blanked out. Through a telephone call, the home viewer attempted to guess what is that particular person doing using only the sound he heard. The winner was awarded a cash prize from an ever-growing jackpot.

=== Wow Meganon ===
On September 6, 2010, Wow Mali became Wow Meganon. Similar to Wow Maling Mali, Joey De Leon remains as the main host, together with Jeff "Mr. Fu" Espiritu, Calamity Fun, Wanlu, Miko Petito, Maui Manalo, and Jeffrey Tam as the new co-hosts of the show. Aside from the gags, it featured segments like street magic and a puppet show. The show ended on April 8, 2011.

=== Third revival ===
The third revival of Wow Mali premiered on April 10, 2011. However, it ended on February 5, 2012.

=== Fourth revival ===
Wow Mali Pa Rin logo from September 2013 - June 2014

The TV5 management decides to revive the program in September 2013 and named it Wow Mali Pa Rin! (transl. Wow Still Wrong!) which will replace Talentadong Pinoy's timeslot, alongside Who Wants to be a Millionaire?, and Pinoy Explorer. The series was aired on September 15, 2013, at 8pm.

=== Fifth revival ===
A new title again as Wow Mali: Lakas Ng Tama (transl. Wow Wrong: How Strong is the Correct!) was premiered on TV5 on June 22, 2014, with the same host funnyman Joey De Leon and various guest stars of the show.

=== Sixth revival ===
In November 2022, TV5 announced that Wow Mali would be revived as part of its lineup for 2023. It is now co-produced by APT Entertainment and Cignal TV. The sixth and current revival, titled Wow Mali: Doble Tama (transl. Wow Wrong: Double Impact), is hosted by the comedic duo of Jose Manalo and Wally Bayola and premiered on August 26, 2023. The show aired on TV5 every Saturdays at 10:30 PM with a delayed telecast on Buko Channel and it also have a 15-minute counterpart called Wow Mali: Doble Tawa that currently airs from Mondays to Sundays at 11:00 PM on RPTV. The revival comes after Joey de Leon, the original host of Wow Mali, began hosting a similar program on Net 25 titled Oh No It's B.O. (Biro Only). De Leon, however, gave his blessing to Manalo and Bayola to host the return of Wow Mali.

Reruns of the show's past episodes were broadcast under the title The Best of Wow Mali from June 24 to August 19, 2023, in preparation for the new episodes. After over a year, the show ended on October 26, 2024.

== Hosts ==
=== Final hosts ===
- Jose Manalo (2023–24)
- Wally Bayola (2023–24)

=== Former hosts ===
- Joey de Leon (1996–2008, 2009–15)
- Mike "Pekto" Nacua
- Jeffrey "Mr. Fu" Espiritu (2010–15)
- Totong Federez (puppeteer of Dennis Wrongman, the puppet version of former NBA Star Dennis Rodman)
- China Tuason (as Krissy, a parody of Kris Aquino)
- Via Antonio (as Doray Alaskadora, a parody of Dora the Explorer).

== Awards ==
- Winner, 1st MTRCB Television Awards for Best Comedy Show (2009)
- Winner, KBP Golden Dove Awards for the Best Gag Show (1997, 2005 & 2009).
- Nominated, PMPC Star Awards for TV's Best Gag Show (1996–2013)
- Nominated, Catholic Mass Media Awards Best Comedy Show (1996–2013)
