= Cristy FerMinute =

Philippine entertainment talk show

- Final title card from 1997 to 2000
- Also known as: Cristy Per Minute
- Genre: Talk show Entertainment news
- Created by: ABS-CBN Corporation; TV5 Network; Cignal TV
- Presented by: Cristy Fermin
- Country of origin: Philippines
- Original language: Filipino
- No. of episodes: 1,531

Production
- Producers: Roldeo Endrinal writers = Jillmer Dy, Arlene Acosta, Armi Presbitero, Ian Buenaventura, Richard Cruz, Liza Endaya, Evangeline Pena
- Running time: 30 minutes (Cristy Per Minute); 60 minutes (Cristy FerMinute, since 2022); 120 minutes (Cristy FerMinute, 2010–22)

Original release
- Network: ABS-CBN
- Release: February 6, 1995 – January 7, 2000
- Network: AksyonTV; One PH; True TV
- Release: February 21, 2011 – present

Related
- Showbiz Lingo/Showbiz Lingo Plus

Cristy FerMinute
- Title card since 2021
- Genre: Entertainment news
- Running time: 1 hour
- Country of origin: Philippines
- Home station: DWFM (2010–24); DWLA (2024–present)
- Hosted by: Cristy Fermin; Romel Chika
- Created by: TV5 Network and Cignal TV
- Narrated by: Martin Andanar (2010–present); Mox de Vera (2019–present)
- Recording studio: TV5 Complex, Novaliches, Quezon City (2010–13); TV5 Media Center, Mandaluyong (2013–20, 2024–present); Remote locations (2020–present)
- Original release: November 8, 2010 – present
- No. of episodes: 3,561 (as of August 8, 2024)

Cristy FerMinute (previously Cristy Per Minute) is a Philippine television talk show broadcast by ABS-CBN. Originally hosted by Cristy Fermin, Ogie Diaz, John Lapus, Gia Garchitorena, Richard Pinlac, MJ Felipe and Martin D, it aired as Cristy Per Minute from February 6, 1995 to January 7, 2000. The show renamed to Cristy FerMinute on radio via Radyo5 92.3 News FM/92.3 Radyo5 True FM/True FM sa 105.9 on November 8, 2010, followed by a television broadcast on AksyonTV from February 28, 2011 to January 11, 2019, One PH from February 18, 2019 to October 2, 2020 and returned since January 11, 2021 and True FM TV/True TV from May 1, 2024 to August 14, 2026. Fermin and Romel Chika currently serve as the hosts.

== Cristy Per Minute on ABS-CBN ==
Cristy Fermin was one of the hosts of the top-rating Sunday talk show Showbiz Lingo (later reformatted as Showbiz Lingo Plus). When ABS-CBN executives saw her expertise in exploiting the latest showbiz news, they decided to put up a daily afternoon show that the masses would also look forward to aside from Showbiz Lingo. Cristy Per Minute was conceptualized by ABS-CBN and aired its first episode on January 30, 1995. In here, Cristy interviewed famous showbiz personalities about various issues, dished out her own opinions and even letting the viewers have their own view about the intrigues and headlines. Every Friday, the show also had its Grand Fans Day to honor and recognize celebrities and/or media personalities who gained popularity and at the peak of their careers held at the various venues (e.g. schools, colleges, universities, parks and malls).

The show was co-hosted by Ogie Diaz and John Lapus, who were working with Fermin in the top-rated Sunday talk show Showbiz Lingo. Their job on the show is to guide the viewers about the latest topics through voting and texting, wherein they have to answer a poll question and through their own segments. The question is about the celebrity that guested on the show. Along with Diaz and Lapus, Gia Garchitorena was also joined in as co-host of the show, all 3 were hired by then-Supervising producer Deo Endrinal.

Cristy Per Minute had a tremendous run for quite some time that it had broken the monotony of the afternoon programming that was traditionally reserved for afternoon drama programs. Due to their immense popularity at the 1:30 pm time slot, their rival program Eat Bulaga! created a 10-minute showbiz segment "Aminin!" as a pre-emptive move. But Cristy Per Minute would later on sustain their high ratings when their sister program 'Sang Linggo nAPO Sila came up with "'Wag Isnabin" as a response. On February 8, 1999, the show had to move on its new timeslot at 3:00 pm when ABS-CBN decided to produce afternoon dramas again on the noontime block starting with Marinella. Later in the same year, WRR 101.9 disc jockey Martin D joined the show as a segment co-host. On January 7, 2000, the show aired its final episode after an almost successful 5-year run on the network.

== Cristy FerMinute on True FM/One PH/True TV ==
Fermin, who is now working for TV5, is currently hosting Cristy FerMinute. It premiered on November 8, 2010, on Radyo5 92.3 News FM, then broadcasting on the DWFM frequency. She was joined by Richard Pinlac as her co-host during the program's first four years, until Pinlac was replaced by Ronnie Carasco and Wendell Alvarez (Fermin's substitute host while Carasco is not on air). Elmer Reyes and Arniel Serato later joined the show, a few months after the program's pilot episode. Romel Chika is the present her co-host. The radio show dishes out the latest showbiz news that are happening in the country and in abroad.

Currently, the show is produced by Cignal TV. It is simulcast on television via AksyonTV from 2011 to 2019, One PH from 2019 to 2020 and since 2021, and True TV from 2024 to 2026. It also streams online on Facebook and YouTube via One PH, True FM.

On November 1, 2024, the program aired its last episode on DWFM 92.3, as Radyo5 True FM would transfer to DWLA 105.9 effective November 4.

== Hosts ==
=== Main host ===
- Cristy Fermin (1995–2000; 2010–present)

=== Co-hosts ===
- Ogie Diaz (1995–2000; segment host, Cristy Per Minute)
- John Lapus (1995–2000; segment host, Cristy Per Minute)
- Gia Garchitorena (1995–2000; segment host, Cristy Per Minute)
- Richard Pinlac (1995–2000; segment host, Cristy Per Minute; 2010–15; Cristy FerMinute)
- MJ Felipe (1995–2000; segment host, Cristy Per Minute)
- Martin D (1999–2000; segment host, Cristy Per Minute)
- Elmer Reyes (2011–15; Cristy FerMinute)
- Arniel Serato (2011–15; Cristy FerMinute)
- Ronnie Carasco (2015–17; Cristy FerMinute)
- Wendell Alvarez (2017–19; Cristy FerMinute, substitute host for Ronnie Carasco)
- Michael Delizo (2017–19; Cristy FerMinute, substitute host for Ronnie Carasco)
- Romel Chika (2019–present; Cristy FerMinute)

== See also ==
- List of programs broadcast by ABS-CBN
- List of programs broadcast by True FM/One PH
