= Juicy! =

- Genre: Talk show
- Created by: TV5
- Written by: Juan Paolo Aquino; Anna Canoneo; Cristina Cipriano
- Directed by: Juan Paolo Aquino
- Presented by: Cristy Fermin; Alex Gonzaga; IC Mendoza; Shalala
- Country of origin: Philippines
- Original language: Filipino
- No. of seasons: 16

Production
- Executive producer: Omar Tortuas
- Editors: Sam Creencia; Marius Valerio
- Running time: 30 minutes

Original release
- Network: TV5
- Release: August 11, 2008 – August 3, 2012

Related
- Ang Latest

Juicy! is a Philippine television talk show broadcast by TV5. Originally hosted by Alex Gonzaga and IC Mendoza. It aired from August 11, 2008 to August 3, 2012, and was replaced by Ang Latest. Gonzaga, Mendoza, Cristy Fermin and Shalala served as the final hosts.

== History ==
=== 2008–2009 ===
Newly branded TV5 unleashed its showbiz talk show last 2008, hosted by Alex Gonzaga. The goal of the show, which was then a 30-minute program airing every morning, is to provide allegedly unbiased entertainment news to the viewers unlike entertainment shows in rival networks ABS-CBN and GMA Network. Later that year, the late and great Inday Badiday's grandchild, IC Mendoza, was chosen to co-host the show with Gonzaga. Viewers of the program, however, note that the shows lambasts stars from the two larger networks and only promotes Kapatid, demonstrating an inconsistency on the premise of "lack of bias".

=== 2010–2012: "Juicy", now spicier and juicier! ===
Now that TV5 has gotten bigger and better, with new upcoming shows and bigger showbiz names joining the station, juicy! has also been busy reinventing itself. The daily showbiz talk show is now spicier with talk show hosts Mo Twister and Cristy Fermin joining the fold. Mo and Cristy got entangled in a nasty verbal feud back in 2006 over Mo's controversial "40 Forbidden Questions" that he asks to showbiz celebrities guesting on his radio show "Good Times with Mo". Incidentally, the two hosts also headline TV5's weekly Sunday showbiz talk show "Paparazzi" with Dolly Anne Carvajal and former The Buzz co-host Ruffa Gutierrez joining them.

Later on the almost everyday Guest Panel of the show, Shalala was hired as a regular panel of the show because of his comedic act and his Bonggang Blind Items.

It was cancelled along with its weekend "version", Paparazzi but replaced with Ang Latest starting August 4, 2012.

== Hosts ==
=== Final hosts ===
- Alex Gonzaga (2008–12)
- IC Mendoza (2008–12)
- Cristy Fermin (2010–12)
- Shalala (2010–12)

=== Guest hosts ===
- Jose Javier Reyes
- Gladys Reyes
- Divine Lee
- Nelita "Aposing" Balbuena

=== Former hosts ===
- Mo Twister (2010–11)
- Paco & Gundito (2012)

== Awards and recognitions ==
In the recent 25th Annual Consumers' Quality Awards, "Juicy" was adjudged as Best Entertainment Talk Show. It was the show's first award after airing for less than a year on TV. Hosts Alex Gonzaga and IC Mendoza also bagged respective awards as Best Female Talk Show Host and Best Male Talk Show Host.

== See also ==
- List of TV5 (Philippine TV network) original programming
