= Entertainment Spotlight =

Entertainment Spotlight was an English-language entertainment news program on CTV in Quebec, Canada broadcast on Sundays. The program was filmed in trendy locations in Montreal, and focused on movies and leisure in-and-around the city, and interviews with movie stars.

Entertainment Spotlight was hosted by Mose Persico and Natasha Hall (2008) (Orla Johannes 2000–2008). Jeremy Szafron was also a host on the show.

Shot on location, Entertainment Spotlight was a movie entertainment magazine show about the various forms of leisure in and around Montreal. The half-hour production also broadcast Hollywood celebrity interviews, Fashion Profiles, local Music news and interviews and the city's restaurant spots and trends.

Entertainment Spotlight was transmitted after Montreal's CTV News. The program attracted a viewership of over 225,000. Hollywood movies and interviews with film celebrities, Fashion, Music and "what's cooking in the kitchen of some of Montreal's finest eateries", were included.

The show's official website, updated weekly, was www.entertainmentspotlight.ca

The show was discontinued, with a last episode on December 28, 2008, due to the expansion of the CTV Weekend News at 6 p.m.
