= Showbiz Lingo =

1992–99 Philippine television talk show

- One of the logos used by Showbiz Lingo from 1992 to 1995
- Genre: Showbiz-oriented talk show
- Written by: Jillmer Dy, Rondel Lindayag, Arlene Acosta, Joselle Mercado, Remily Granado, Armi Presbitero, Ronald Padriga, Evangeline Pena
- Directed by: Arnel Natividad; Laurenti Dyogi
- Presented by: Butch Francisco; Cristy Fermin; Roderick Paulate; Edu Manzano; Christine Bersola-Babao; Ogie Diaz; John Lapus
- Opening theme: Showbiz Lingo by Ogie Alcasid, Geneva Cruz, Dingdong Avanzado and Donita Rose (1992-1997)
- Composer: Venhee Saturno
- Country of origin: Philippines
- Original language: Filipino
- No. of episodes: 383

Production
- Producers: Roxy Liquigan; John Lapus
- Production locations: Studio 9 ABS-CBN Broadcasting Center, Quezon City, Philippines
- Running time: 60-90 minutes
- Production company: ABS-CBN Studios

Original release
- Network: ABS-CBN
- Release: August 16, 1992 – June 6, 1999

Related
- Cristy Per Minute (1995–2000)

Showbiz Lingo (transl. showbiz Sunday, later Showbiz Lingo Plus transl. showbiz Sunday plus) was a Philippine weekly entertainment news and talk show broadcast by ABS-CBN. Originally hosted by Cristy Fermin and Butch Francisco, it aired as Showbiz Lingo from August 16, 1992 to May 4, 1997, replacing Junior Patrol. The program was renamed to Showbiz Lingo Plus from May 11, 1997 to June 6, 1999, and was replaced by The Buzz. Fermin and Roderick Paulate served as the final hosts. It was the popular Sunday afternoon talk show and featured local celebrity gossip and news.

== Hosts ==
=== Main hosts ===
- Cristy Fermin (1992-99)
- Butch Francisco (1992-97)
- Christine Bersola-Babao (1995-97)
- Edu Manzano (1998)
- Roderick Paulate (1998-99)
- Kris Aquino (pinch-hitter of Cristy Fermin, 1992-95; 1996-99)

=== Segment presenters ===
- Ogie Diaz (1992-99)
- Morly Alinio (1992-93)
- John Lapus (1993-99)
- Pilar Mateo (1997-99)
- Aster Amoyo (1997-99)
- Dolly Anne Carvajal (1997-99)

== History ==
=== As Showbiz Lingo (1992-97) ===
When the show Rumors: Facts and Humors (spearheaded by Alfie Lorenzo) ended in 1988, ABS-CBN premiered three other showbiz talk shows as its predecessors, Showbiz na Showbiz (1986-1987), Sine Sine, a comedy inspired talk show (1988) and Cinemascoop, a 60 minutes daily late afternoon entertainment news talk show before TV Patrol as a pre-programmed show (hosted by Boy de Guia) (1988), which did not last long. The network conceptualized a new talk show that would be popular with a large audience. Four years later as part of the major change and transition in Philippine television, the management decided to formulate a showbiz-oriented talk show. Showbiz Lingo premiered on Sunday August 16, 1992. It was originally hosted by film reviewer and entertainment columnist Butch Francisco and entertainment columnist Cristy Fermin. Ogie Diaz and John Lapus (a researcher for the show) were introduced as the first reporters; Diaz and Lapus later would co-host the program.

The show's concept was similar to its predecessor, Rumors: Facts and Humors, wherein the hosts presented the latest showbiz news, controversies and intrigues. Showbiz Lingo built on the concept and added interviews with the stars in a live-panel discussion.

Christine Bersola, who was then the anchor of Star News (a segment of ABS-CBN's flagship newscast TV Patrol), joined the show in 1995 as a co-host for two years.

=== As Showbiz Lingo Plus (1997-99) ===
In May 11, 1997, the show was reformatted with a new title Showbiz Lingo Plus featuring the opening segment was presented by three showbiz writers Pilar Mateo, Aster Amoyo and Dolly Anne Carvajal (Daughter of the late veteran showbiz reporter Inday Badiday). They joined Butch and Cristy as the team of reporters. Bersola left the show at that time to focus hosting the morning show Alas Singko Y Medya. Francisco left the show in December 28, 1997, as well in 1998 to migrate to the United States. He was replaced by Edu Manzano, who left after one season due to his ongoing term as vice mayor of Makati City. Roderick Paulate came on board as Fermin's co-host and stayed on until the last show's episode when he remained as host of Magandang Tanghali, Bayan.

The show plummeted in the ratings for the Sunday afternoon slot in 1995 when rival network GMA premiered Startalk hosted by Lolit Solis, Boy Abunda and Kris Aquino. Startalk surpassed Showbiz Lingo in the ratings for a time, but after Aquino left Startalk in 1996 and after reformatting, Showbiz Lingo regained top-rating status. Startalk was moved to the Saturday afternoon slot; it was replaced on Sunday by S-Files, hosted by Paolo Bediones and Lyn Ching, which earned good reviews as well as the 1999 PMPC Star Awards for Television for Best Showbiz Show. Showbiz Lingo Plus aired its last episode on June 6, 1999. The management tapped former Startalk host Boy Abunda to host its new entertainment show, The Buzz (after 23 years since 2022, he returned to GMA). Cristy Fermin's daily solo talk show, Cristy Per Minute (later Cristy FerMinute) was discontinued months after Showbiz Lingo Plus ended its run. Butch Francisco was later hired as Abunda's replacement on Startalk.

== See also ==
- List of programs broadcast by ABS-CBN
