= Ang Latest =

- Genre: Talk show
- Created by: ABC Development Corporation
- Written by: Anna Canonito; Juan Paolo Aquino; Jesusito Anne Balilo
- Directed by: GB Sampedro
- Presented by: Amy Perez; Mr. Fu; Cristy Fermin
- Country of origin: Philippines
- Original languages: Filipino; English

Production
- Executive producer: Omar Lotejos
- Running time: 30 minutes

Original release
- Network: TV5
- Release: August 4, 2012 – July 19, 2013

Ang Latest (Filipino for "The Latest") is a Philippine television talk show broadcast by TV5. Hosted by Amy Perez, Mr. Fu and Cristy Fermin. It aired every Saturdays at 10:30 am (later moved to 11 pm and 11:30 pm) from August 4, 2012 to July 13, 2013, replacing Paparazzi. The show aired as Ang Latest Up Late every Weekdays at 12:15 am (later at 11:45 pm and 11:15 pm and 11:30 pm and 11:15 pm) from August 6, 2012 to July 19, 2013, replacing Juicy!.

== Hosts ==
- Amy Perez
- Mr. Fu
- Cristy Fermin
- Lucy Torres-Gomez
- Jose Javier Reyes
- Shalala
- Divine Lee

== See also ==
- List of TV5 (Philippine TV network) original programming
