= Alfie Lorenzo =

Filipino entertainment writer and media personality (1939–2017)

- Born: Alfonso Castro Lorenzo; January 26, 1939; Porac, Pampanga, Philippine Islands
- Died: August 1, 2017 (aged 78); San Juan de Dios Hospital, Pasay, Philippines
- Other name: Tito ALfie
- Occupations: TV host, showbiz columnist, talent manager
- Years active: 1968–2016

Alfonso Castro Lorenzo (26 January 1939 – 1 August 2017), better known as Alfie Lorenzo, was a Filipino showbiz columnist, radio commentator, TV host and talent manager.

== Early life ==
He was born on January 26, 1939, in Porac, Pampanga.

== Career ==
Lorenzo was best known for managing talents like Judy Ann Santos, Karla Estrada, Jackie Forster, Gretchen Barretto and Sunshine Cruz, among others.

== Filmography ==
=== Publicity staff ===
Title	Year
Facundo Alitaftaf	1978
Mahal Ko, Mahal Mo	1978
Pinay American Style	1979
City After Dark	1980
Mag-Toning Muna Tayo	1980

=== Technical staff ===
Title	Year
Pinay American Style	1979

=== Publicist ===
Title	Year
Salawahan	1979
Story of 3 Loves	1982
Anak	1982
Pepe en Pilar	1983
Wanted: Bata Batuta	1987
Mahal Kita Walang Iba	1992
Ayoko Na Sanang Magmahal	1993
Hulihin: Probinsyanong Mandurukot	1993
Aguinaldo	1993
Pido Dida 3: May Kambal Na!	1993
Adan Ronquillo: Tubong Cavite, Laking Tondo	1993
Galvez: Hanggang Sa Dulo ng Mundo Hahanapin Kita	1993
Abel Morado: Ikaw Ang May Sala	1993
Mga 'Syanong Parak	1993
Maricris Sioson: Japayuki	1993
Guwapings Dos	1993
Dino, Abangan Ang Susunod Na!	1993
Bulag, Pipi at Bingi	1993
Kailan Dalawa Ang Mahal	1993
Ulong Pugot, Naglalagot	1993
Sobra Talaga Over	1994
Paano na? Sa Mundo ni Janet	1994
Multo in the City	1994
Bala at Lipstick	1994
Hataw Tatay Hataw	1994
Geron Olivar	1994
Binibini ng Aking Panaginip	1994
The Fatima Buen Story	1994
Nag-Iisang Bituin	1994
The Secrets of Sarah Jane: Sana'y Mapatawad Mo	1994
Ging Gang Gooly Giddiyap: I Love You Daddy	1994
Boy! Gising!	1995
Batang X	1995
Costales	1995
Melencio Magat: Dugo Laban Dugo	1996
Mano Po 2: My Home	2003
Troika	2007
Noy	2010

=== Publicity and promotions ===
Title	Year
Temptation Island	1980
Schoolgirls	1982
I Love You, I Hate You	1983
Super Islaw and the Flying Kids	1986
Inday-Inday sa Palitaw	1986
Nasaan Ka ng Kailangan Kita?	1986
Forward March	1987
Jack en Poy: Hale-Hale Hoy!	1987
Rosa Mystica	1987
Bunsong Kerubin	1987
Shoot that Ball	1987
Maria Went To Town	1987
Pinulot Ka Lang sa Lupa	1987
Ibulong Mo sa Diyos	1988
Love Boat: Mahal, Trip Kita!	1988
Taray at Teroy	1988
Kambal Tuko	1988
Wake Up Little Susie	1988
Super Inday and the Golden Bibe	1988
Nagbabagang Luha	1988
Love Letters	1988
Petrang Kabayo at ang Pilyang Kuting	1988
Tiyanak	1988
Sa Puso Ko Hahalik Ang Mundo	1988
Babaeng Hampaslupa	1988
Me and Ninja Liit	1988
Lord, Bakit Ako Pa?	1988
Si Malakas At Si Maganda	1989
Regal Shocker The Movie	1989
Hot Summer	1989
Starzan: Shouting STar of the Jungle	1989
Magic to Love	1989
Pahiram ng Isang Umaga	1989
Here Comes the Bride	1989
Long Ranger and Tonton: Shooting Stars of the West	1989
Impaktita	1989
Kung Maibabalik Ko Lang	1989
May Pulis, May Pulis Sa Ilalim ng Tulay	1989
Bilangin Ang Bituin Sa Langit	1989
Handa na Ang Bukay Mo, Calida	1989
Super Mouse and the Roborats	1989
Tamis ng Unang Halik	1989
Huwag Kang Hahalik sa Diablo	1989
Romeo Loves Juliet...But Their Families Hate Each Other!	1989
Last 2 Minutes	1989
My Funny Valentine	1990
Twist: Ako si Ikaw, Ikaw si Ako	1990
Small Medium Large	1990
Papa's Girl	1990
Crocodile Jones: The Son of Indiana Dundee	1990
Kabayo Kids	1990
Feel na Feel	1990
Hahamakin Ang Lahat	1990
Michael and Madonna	1990
Island of Desrie	1990
Samson en Goliath	1990
Hotdog	1990
Rocky Plus V	1991
Pakasalan Mo Ako	1991
Leon at Tigre	1991
Kung Sino Pa Ang Minahal	1991
Goosebusters	1991
Anak ni Janice	1991
Alyas Batman en Robin	1991
Makiusap Ka Sa Diyos	1991
Pretty Boy Hoodlum	1991
Yakapin Mo Ako Muli	1992
True Confessions (Evelyn, Myrna, & Margie)	1992
The Return of the Long Ranger & Tonton: How the West Was Wrong	1992
Ikaw Ang Lahat Sa Akin	1992
Bakit Ako Mahihiya?	1992
Angelina The Movie	1992
The Good, the Bad, & the Ugly	1992
Alyas Boy Kano	1992
First Time... Like a Virgin!	1992
Guwapings: The First Adventures	1992
Shotgun Banjo	1992
Ang Katawan ni Sofia	1992
Sinungaling Mong Puso	1992
Dobol Dribol	1992
Lt. Madarang: Iginuhit Sa Dugo	1993
Gascon: Bala Ang Katapat Mo	1993
Magkasangga Sa Batas	1993
Isusumbong Kita Sa Tatay Ko	1999

=== Publicity coordinator ===
Title	Year
May Pag-Ibig Pa Kaya?	2002

=== Radio ===
Year	Title	Role	Station
2004–2008	What It's All About Alfie	Host	DZMM Radyo Patrol 630

== Health and death ==
In 2010, Lorenzo also suffered a heart attack and had undergone emergency angioplasty. Lorenzo died on August 1, 2017, due to heart attack at the age of 78.
