= Shalala (broadcaster) =

Filipino broadcaster (1960–2021)

- Born: Carmelito Masagnay Reyes; January 21, 1960; Manila, Philippines
- Died: June 23, 2021 (aged 61); Quezon City, Philippines
- Resting place: Manila North Cemetery
- Occupations: TV host, comedian, radio personality, actor
- Years active: 1994–2021

Carmelito Masagnay Reyes, known professionally as Shalala (January 21, 1960 – June 23, 2021), was a Filipino radio and TV personality and comedian.

== Early life ==
Carmelito Reyes a.k.a. Shalala was born on January 20, 1961, in Manila, Philippines.

== Early career ==
Shalala's first TV show was Walang Tulugan with the Master Showman in 2001 on GMA-7 with the late Master Showman and fellow comedian German "Kuya Germs" Moreno until 2010. Shalala then transferred to TV5 for his new projects and TV shows, but returned to Walang Tulugan around 2014.

== Later career ==
Shalala returned to GMA-7 in 2014 following his return to Walang Tulugan with the Master Showman with new host Nora Aunor, but the show ended in February 2016 after the death of Kuya Germs.

In 2017, Shalala returned to TV again for guesting in Sunday PinaSaya, also on GMA-7. This was his first TV guesting appearance after one year since the death of Kuya Germs in 2016.

He was a former supporting cast in ABS-CBN's defunct afternoon teleserye Pusong Ligaw with his co-star Bianca King, also from TV5. They were also joined by Beauty Gonzalez, but the drama series ended around January 2018. This was Shalala's first ABS-CBN show since he left GMA-7.

Shalala returned to his original TV network GMA-7 via the weekend musical variety program Sunday PinaSaya and the comedy anthology in 2019, Dear Uge in which he played a gay father. He also guested in the morning talk program Mars Pa More, and in 2020 played in the segment "Bawal Judgmental!" on Eat Bulaga! and guested in Chika Besh which was his last TV appearance.

== Death ==
Shalala died of pulmonary tuberculosis on the morning of June 23, 2021, at the Fe Del Mundo Medical Center in Quezon City. He was 61.

== Radio ==
- Shalala and Friends (2015–2017)
- Master Showman: Walang Siyesta (2013–2014)
- Ladies' Room (2013–2014)
- Showbiz Rampa! (2010–2014)
- Todo Bigay! (2010–2014)

== Filmography ==
=== Television ===
- Walang Tulugan with the Master Showman (2001–2010, 2014–2016) - co-host
- StarTalk (2005–2015) - guest co host
- Daisy Siete Season 22: Kambalilong (2009)
- Tweetbiz (2010)
- Eat Bulaga! (2010 – 202?) - guest
- Juicy! (2010–2012) - host
- Swerte Swerte Lang (2011) - host
- Inday Wanda (2011)
- Hey It's Saberdey! (2011–2012) - host
- Good Morning Club (2012–2014) - co-host
- Wasak! (2013) - guest
- Bubble Gang (2015 – 202?) - guest
- Sabado Badoo (2015) - cameo footage featured
- CelebriTV (2015) - co-host
- Ang Pinaka (2015 – 202?) - guest
- StarStruck Season 6 (2015-2016) - guest talent manager
- Dear Uge (2016 – 202?) - various/guest
- Sunday PinaSaya (2017) - guest
- Pusong Ligaw (2017) - supporting cast
- Magandang Buhay (2017) - guest
- Home Sweetie Home (2017) - guest
- Banana Sundae (2017) - guest
- MMK: Ang Tahanan Mo (2018) - various/guest
- StarStruck Season 7 (2018) - guest talent manager
- Mars Pa More (2019 – 202?) - guest
- Magpakailanman (2019) - various/guest
- Pepito Manaloto (2020) - guest funny gay character
- Wag Po! (2020) - guest
- Fill in the Banks (2020) - guest
- Chika Besh! (2020) - guest

=== Film ===
- Kalakal (2008) Mama Sads
- Paupahan (2008) Isah
- Booking (2009)
- Ang Darling Kong Aswang (2009)
- Si Agimat at si Enteng Kabisote (2010)
- Petrang Kabayo (2010)
- Ligo na Ü, Lapit na Me (2011)
- Si Agimat, si Enteng Kabisote, at si Ako (2012)
- Echoserang Frog (2014)

=== Miscellaneous crew ===
- Ping Lacson: Super Cop (2000) - advertising and promotions staff
- Luv Text (2001) - advertising and promotions staff
- Batas ng Lansangan (2002) - advertising and promotions staff: Maverick Films
- You and Me Against the World (2003) - staff: Fix Media Ventures
- Utang ng Ama (2003) - advertising and promotions staff
- Pasukob (2007) - overall promotions staff: TV and special events
- Paupahan (2008) - publicity and promotions
- One Night Only (2008) - television coordinator: publicity and promotions
- Marino (2009) - publicity and promotions
