= The Buzz (talk show) =

1999–2015 Philippine television talk show

- The final logo
- Also known as: Buzz ng Bayan
- Genre: Entertainment; Talk show
- Created by: ABS-CBN Studios
- Written by: Jilmer Dy; Rondel Lindayag; Romer Gonzales; Armi Presbitero; Darla Sauler
- Directed by: Laurenti Dyogi; Arnel Natividad; Jonathan Diaz
- Presented by: See Hosts
- Country of origin: Philippines
- Original languages: Filipino (primary); English (secondary)
- No. of seasons: 16
- No. of episodes: 835

Production
- Executive producers: Roxy Liquigan; Nancy Benito–Yabut
- Producer: Deo Endrinal
- Editors: Jobert Sucaldito; Cecille Basaysay; AJ Domingo; Earl Ellustrisimo; Levi Ligon; Aldrich Octaviano; Geoffrey Tan
- Running time: 90 minutes
- Production company: ABS-CBN Studios

Original release
- Network: ABS-CBN
- Release: June 13, 1999 – April 5, 2015

Related
- Aquino & Abunda Tonight; Tonight with Boy Abunda

The Buzz (formerly Buzz ng Bayan) is a Philippine television talk show broadcast by ABS-CBN. Originally hosted by Boy Abunda, it aired on the network's Yes Weekend line up from June 13, 1999 to April 5, 2015, replacing Showbiz Lingo and was replaced by Kapamilya Mega Blockbusters. Abunda, Kris Aquino and Toni Gonzaga served as the final hosts. It is the longest running talk show of ABS-CBN.

This talk show is streaming online on Jeepney TV 's YouTube Channel every 4:30 pm.

== History ==
=== The Buzz (1999–2013) ===
The Buzz premiered on June 13, 1999, as it replaced the popular Sunday afternoon Showbiz-oriented talk show (run for seven years) Showbiz Lingo, and was originally hosted solely by Boy Abunda with its first episode being taped at Mondo and Savoia restaurant in The Fort, Taguig. The show's original format was similar to ABS-CBN's The Correspondents were Abunda interacts with a group of showbiz field reporters dishing out the latest showbiz news. Showbiz columnists Pat-P Daza and Ricky Lo along with Walden Belen, Tim Yap, Reena Cruz, John Lapus (who used to be a researcher in its predecessor Showbiz Lingo) and Dolly Anne Carvajal served as its reporters.

The format was later on discarded when the network took in Kris Aquino during the show's second season on January 9, 2000. Aquino's inclusion in the show served as a reunion of sorts between her and Abunda, when they used to host Startalk on GMA Network. The show became an interesting gabfest with Aquino and Abunda dishing out the latest exclusives with the help of its reliable staff. Lo and Lapus were also promoted as co-hosts of the show. Actress and model Angelica Jones was introduced as the new segment presenter after the departure of Yap and Carvajal from the show. Jones left the show in 2002, and was replaced by reporter and blogger JV Villar. He later left after a few months, and this was also the same year where Daza was relieved from the show due to commitments with her family and pursuing other ventures.

In 2003, the duo welcomed Cristy Fermin as an additional host, who used to headline the network's Saturday talk show S2: Showbiz Sabado and its predecessor Showbiz Lingo. Her opinions and commentaries made the show wider and more noticeable. This was also the same year where one of its original hosts, Lo, left to transfer to GMA Network.

Phoemela Barranda, who was then working at ABS-CBN's flagship newscast TV Patrol World as the anchor of Star Patrol, joined the show to headline the teasers before it actually starts in 2004. Months later, the show welcomed AJ Dee and Anne Curtis to host the new segment Wanna Buzz, but was later renamed as Pinoy Big Brother Buzz (following the debut of the Philippine franchise of Big Brother), where they were joined by comedians Chokoleit and Pokwang and it now serves as pre-programming for The Buzz. The spin-off was eventually scrapped due to its failure to do well in the ratings and was replaced by Your Song.

In 2005, one of its pioneer hosts, Lapus, left the show after his contract in ABS-CBN expired and was given a hosting stint to GMA's S-Files. Jobert Sucaldito served as his replacement in 2006. This year also presented Buzz Express, wherein other showbiz-related news were presented within a time span of 1–2 minutes. It was voice-overed by Roxy Liquigan and Eric John Salut, both staff of the show.

On March 11, 2007, Ruffa Gutierrez became the temporary replacement for Aquino who left the show to focus on her pregnancy and her family. Dawn Zulueta also served as a guest co-host when Ruffa Gutierrez went to the United States for a two-week vacation. When Gutierrez returned in June 2007, the network offered her a permanent co-hosting job in the show.

On October 15, 2008, Cristy Fermin was suspended by the network after she rattled off a series of accusations against former actress Nadia Montenegro in an episode aired on October 5, 2008. According to a statement released by the network, "It was deemed that Ms. Fermin did not conduct herself with due regard to social conventions and public morals. Her statements went beyond the bounds of decency as they involved innocent children who were not party to their personal dispute. Ms. Fermin's statements violated the highest standards of professionalism and journalistic integrity. The act committed by Ms. Fermin brought her and The Buzz to public disrepute, jeopardizing the name and goodwill of both the show and the network." On October 19, 2008, Ai-Ai de las Alas served as a substitute host for Cristy Fermin, who was suspended by the network for two months, until Aquino returned to the show on October 26, 2008.

In March 2010, Ruffa Gutierrez left the show after signing an exclusive contract to TV5. KC Concepcion later replaced her on April 11.

Months later in June 2010, Aquino left the show after being an on-and-off host of the show for ten years. She decided to leave the show for the reason of that she wanted to spend time with her family and for her not to cause any trouble while her brother, the now-deceased Benigno Aquino III, is in office as the President of the Philippines. Sucaldito, who has been on the show for 4 years, decided to left to concentrate on radio broadcasting (through his DZMM program Mismo! with Ahwel Paz) and his columnist job in Bulgar. After Aquino's departure, Charlene Gonzales and Toni Gonzaga replaced her as hosts on July 11, 2010. On January 8, 2012, KC Concepcion left the show for her commitment to host X Factor Philippines.

On October 13, 2013, Gonzaga and Gonzales bade farewell to the show. With the two hosts' departure, Abunda hinted that the program will be undergoing changes. Abunda said, "Sa inyong walang patid na pagsubaybay, sa inyong walang sawang pagsuporta at sa patuloy naming pagbibigay serbisyo, kasama kayo sa isang panibagong simula. Kasali kayo sa pagbubukas ng isang bagong kabanata, mas malawak, mas malaki. Pakikinggan, paguusapan at pakikialaman. Ito ang pagbabagong kakapitan, pagbabagong tatatak sa puso at isipan. Ito ang inyong The Buzz."

=== Buzz ng Bayan (2013–2014) ===
On October 20, 2013, The Buzz format was discontinued and was reformatted into an interactive entertainment talk-show called Buzz ng Bayan (English: Buzz of the Nation). With the reformat, together with Boy Abunda, Carmina Villarroel and Janice de Belen were added as hosts. The show had three segments, namely: Top News Items, Opinions, and Panel Discussion. After the segment Top News Items, several personalities known as Bayan Buzzers (usually three), would give their own opinions regarding that certain issue. Aida Espiritu, aide of ABS-CBN president, CEO and COO Charo Santos-Concio and Onse Tolentino, a comedian and entertainment reporter/columnist, were the most notable and considered the resident Bayan Buzzers. More than 6 months after the reformatted The Buzz came into airing, Villarroel confirmed that the show will again be reformatted and return to its old title as The Buzz. She also confirmed that she will not be part of the reformat, and stated that two former hosts in The Buzz will return to the show together with Boy Abunda.

=== The Buzz 15 (2014–2015) ===
On May 14, 2014, in ABS-CBN's official YouTube channel, the network hinted that the show will be revert to its original title, The Buzz 15. The said reformat will coincide the show's 15th anniversary. It premiered on May 18, 2014 featuring footage of the show's first episode and some of its most notable interviews and commentaries, then afterwards Abunda graced the show's re-opening. He later introduced the return of Toni Gonzaga and Kris Aquino as his co-hosts. This also marked the return of the segment P.O.V., wherein their first topic was about the concept of linked showbiz couples. After its pilot aired, most viewers applauded the show for its reformat and hoping for more episodes to come with this new and fresher look to show.

=== Cancellation ===
On April 5, 2015, The Buzz had their last show on an Easter Sunday. Boy Abunda delivered the final farewell on behalf of the co-hosts and staff, following the VTR that detailed the show's history and controversies that the hosts dealt with. Abunda cited changes through the years pertaining to how technology has changed the world, how it's changed the way we communicate, how it's changed the media, and how the news is delivered. But he assured three points in his farewell speech; "they will be back", "showbiz news is here to stay", and "the talk show genre is here to stay".

== Hosts ==
=== Final main hosts ===
- Boy Abunda (1999–2015)
- Kris Aquino (2000–2010; 2014–2015)
- Toni Gonzaga (2010–2015)

=== Former main hosts ===
- Ricky Lo (1999–2003)
- John Lapus (1999–2005)
- Cristy Fermin (2003–2008)
- Ruffa Gutierrez (2007–2010)
- KC Concepcion (2010–2012)
- Charlene Gonzales (2010–2013)
- Carmina Villarroel (2013–2014)
- Janice de Belen (2013–2014)

=== Guest hosts ===
- Dawn Zulueta (2007, 2011; fill-in for Ruffa Gutierrez)
- Ai-Ai de las Alas (2008–2010; fill-in for Cristy Fermin and Kris Aquino)
- Gretchen Barretto (2013; fill-in for Charlene Gonzales)
- Vice Ganda (2012, 2014; fill-in for Boy Abunda and Kris Aquino)

=== Segment presenters ===
- Dolly Ann Carvajal (1999–2000)
- Walden Belen (1999–2000)
- Reena Cruz (1999–2000)
- Tim Yap (1999–2000)
- Pat-P Daza-Planas (1999–2002)
- Angelica Jones (2000–2002)
- JV Villar (2002)
- Phoemela Baranda (2004–2015; voice-over, 2010)
- Roxy Liquigan (voice-over; 2004–2014)
- Eric John Salut (voice-over; 2004–2014)
- Anne Curtis (for Wanna Buzz; 2004–2005, Pinoy Big Brother Buzz; 2005–2006)
- AJ Dee (for Wanna Buzz; 2004–2005, Pinoy Big Brother Buzz; 2005–2006)
- Chokoleit (for Wanna Buzz; 2004–2005, Pinoy Big Brother Buzz; 2005–2006)
- Pokwang (for Pinoy Big Brother Buzz; 2005–2006)
- Jobert Sucaldito (2006–2010)
- Aida Espiritu (as a resident Bayan Buzzer; 2013–2014)
- Onse Tolentino (as a resident Bayan Buzzer; 2013–2014)

== Awards ==
The following is an incomplete list of the awards and nominations received by The Buzz and its hosts:

Year	Awards	Organization	Nominee	Nominated for	Result	Ref.
2015	11th USTv Students' Choice Awards	University of Santo Tomas	The Buzz	Students' Choice of Talk Show	Won	
2015	11th USTv Students' Choice Awards	University of Santo Tomas	Toni Gonzaga	Students' Choice of Talk Show Host	Won	
2015	11th Golden Screen TV Awards	Entertainment Press Society, Inc.	The Buzz	Outstanding Showbiz Talk Program Host	Won	
2015	11th Golden Screen TV Awards	Entertainment Press Society, Inc.	Boy Abunda	Outstanding Male Showbiz Talk Program Host	Won	
2015	11th Golden Screen TV Awards	Entertainment Press Society, Inc.	Kris Aquino	Outstanding Female Showbiz Talk Program Host	Won	
2014	28th PMPC Star Awards for TV	Philippine Movie Press Club	The Buzz	Best Showbiz-oriented Show	Won	
2014	28th PMPC Star Awards for TV	Philippine Movie Press Club	Buzz ng Bayan	Best Showbiz-oriented Show	Nominated	
2014	28th PMPC Star Awards for TV	Philippine Movie Press Club	Charlene Gonzales	Best Female Showbiz-oriented Show	Nominated	
2014	28th PMPC Star Awards for TV	Philippine Movie Press Club	Toni Gonzaga	Best Female Showbiz-oriented Show	Nominated	
2014	28th PMPC Star Awards for TV	Philippine Movie Press Club	Carmina Villarroel	Best Female Showbiz-oriented Show	Nominated	
2014	28th PMPC Star Awards for TV	Philippine Movie Press Club	Janice de Belen	Best Female Showbiz-oriented Show	Nominated	
2014	10th USTv Students' Choice Awards	University of Santo Tomas	The Buzz	Students' Choice of Talk Show	Nominated	
2014	10th USTv Students' Choice Awards	University of Santo Tomas	Boy Abunda	Students' Choice of Talk Show Host	Nominated	
2014	10th USTv Students' Choice Awards	University of Santo Tomas	Toni Gonzaga	Students' Choice of Talk Show Host	Won	
2014	10th Golden Screen TV Awards	Entertainment Press Society, Inc.	The Buzz	Outstanding Showbiz Talk Program Host	Nominated	
2014	10th Golden Screen TV Awards	Entertainment Press Society, Inc.	Boy Abunda	Outstanding Male Showbiz Talk Program Host	Won	
2014	10th Golden Screen TV Awards	Entertainment Press Society, Inc.	Charlene Gonzales	Outstanding Female Showbiz Talk Program Host	Nominated	
2014	10th Golden Screen TV Awards	Entertainment Press Society, Inc.	Toni Gonzaga	Outstanding Female Showbiz Talk Program Host	Nominated	
2013	27th PMPC Star Awards for TV	Philippine Movie Press Club	The Buzz	Best Showbiz-oriented Show	Nominated	
2013	27th PMPC Star Awards for TV	Philippine Movie Press Club	Charlene Gonzales	Best Female Showbiz-oriented Show	Nominated	
2013	27th PMPC Star Awards for TV	Philippine Movie Press Club	Toni Gonzaga	Best Female Showbiz-oriented Show	Nominated	
2013	9th USTv Students' Choice Awards	University of Santo Tomas	The Buzz	Best Entertainment News Program	Won	
2013	9th USTv Students' Choice Awards	University of Santo Tomas	Boy Abunda	Best Entertainment News Program Host	Won	
2013	9th USTv Students' Choice Awards	University of Santo Tomas	Toni Gonzaga	Best Entertainment News Program Host	Nominated	
2013	9th Golden Screen TV Awards	Entertainment Press Society, Inc.	The Buzz	Outstanding Showbiz Talk Program	Nominated	
2013	9th Golden Screen TV Awards	Entertainment Press Society, Inc.	Boy Abunda	Outstanding Male Showbiz Talk Program Host	Won	
2013	9th Golden Screen TV Awards	Entertainment Press Society, Inc.	Charlene Gonzales	Outstanding Female Showbiz Talk Program Host	Nominated	
2013	9th Golden Screen TV Awards	Entertainment Press Society, Inc.	Toni Gonzaga	Outstanding Female Showbiz Talk Program Host	Nominated	
2012	26th PMPC Star Awards for TV	Philippine Movie Press Club	The Buzz	Best Celebrity/Showbiz-oriented Talk Show	Won	
2012	26th PMPC Star Awards for TV	Philippine Movie Press Club	KC Concepcion	Best Celebrity/Showbiz-oriented Talk Show Female Host	Nominated	
2012	26th PMPC Star Awards for TV	Philippine Movie Press Club	Toni Gonzaga	Best Celebrity/Showbiz-oriented Talk Show Female Host	Nominated	
2012	8th USTv Students' Choice Awards	University of Santo Tomas	The Buzz	Best Entertainment News Show	Won	
2011	25th PMPC Star Awards for TV	Philippine Movie Press Club	The Buzz	Best Showbiz-oriented Show	Won	
2011	25th PMPC Star Awards for TV	Philippine Movie Press Club	Charlene Gonzales	Best Female Showbiz-oriented Show	Nominated	
2011	25th PMPC Star Awards for TV	Philippine Movie Press Club	Toni Gonzaga	Best Female Showbiz-oriented Show	Nominated	
2011	7th USTv Students' Choice Awards	University of Santo Tomas	The Buzz	Best Entertainment News Show	Won	
2011	8th Golden Screen TV Awards	Entertainment Press Society, Inc.	The Buzz	Outstanding Showbiz Talk Program	Won	
2011	8th Golden Screen TV Awards	Entertainment Press Society, Inc.	Boy Abunda	Outstanding Showbiz Talk Program Host	Won	
2010	24th PMPC Star Awards for TV	Philippine Movie Press Club	The Buzz	Best Showbiz-oriented Show	Won	
2010	24th PMPC Star Awards for TV	Philippine Movie Press Club	Boy Abunda	Best Male Showbiz-oriented Show	Won	
2009	23rd PMPC Star Awards for TV	Philippine Movie Press Club	The Buzz	Best Showbiz-oriented Show	Nominated	
2009	23rd PMPC Star Awards for TV	Philippine Movie Press Club	Kris Aquino	Best Female Showbiz-oriented Show	Nominated	
2009	5th USTv Students' Choice Awards	University of Santo Tomas	The Buzz	Best Entertainment News Show	Won	
2008	22nd PMPC Star Awards for TV	Philippine Movie Press Club	The Buzz	Best Showbiz-oriented Show	Won	
2008	22nd PMPC Star Awards for TV	Philippine Movie Press Club	Boy Abunda	Best Male Showbiz-oriented Show	Won	
2008	22nd PMPC Star Awards for TV	Philippine Movie Press Club	Cristy Fermin	Best Female Showbiz-oriented Show	Won	
2008	22nd PMPC Star Awards for TV	Philippine Movie Press Club	Ruffa Gutierrez	Best Female Showbiz-oriented Show	Won	
2008	4th USTv Students' Choice Awards	University of Santo Tomas	The Buzz	Best Entertainment News Show	Won	
2007	21st PMPC Star Awards for TV	Philippine Movie Press Club	The Buzz	Best Showbiz-oriented Show	Won	
2007	21st PMPC Star Awards for TV	Philippine Movie Press Club	Boy Abunda	Best Male Showbiz-oriented Show	Won	
2007	21st PMPC Star Awards for TV	Philippine Movie Press Club	Cristy Fermin	Best Female Showbiz-oriented Show	Won	
2007	21st PMPC Star Awards for TV	Philippine Movie Press Club	Kris Aquino	Best Female Showbiz-oriented Show	Nominated	
2006	20th PMPC Star Awards for TV	Philippine Movie Press Club	The Buzz	Best Showbiz-oriented Show	Won	
2006	20th PMPC Star Awards for TV	Philippine Movie Press Club	Boy Abunda	Best Male Showbiz-oriented Show	Won	
2006	20th PMPC Star Awards for TV	Philippine Movie Press Club	Kris Aquino	Best Female Showbiz-oriented Show	Won	
2005	2nd Golden Screen TV Awards	Entertainment Press Society, Inc.	The Buzz	Outstanding Showbiz-oriented Program	Nominated	
2005	2nd Golden Screen TV Awards	Entertainment Press Society, Inc.	Boy Abunda	Outstanding Showbiz-oriented Program Host	Won	
2005	2nd Golden Screen TV Awards	Entertainment Press Society, Inc.	Kris Aquino	Outstanding Showbiz-oriented Program Host	Nominated	
2005	19th PMPC Star Awards for TV	Philippine Movie Press Club	The Buzz	Best Showbiz-oriented Show	Won	
2005	19th PMPC Star Awards for TV	Philippine Movie Press Club	Boy Abunda	Best Male Showbiz-oriented Show	Won	
2005	19th PMPC Star Awards for TV	Philippine Movie Press Club	Cristy Fermin	Best Female Showbiz-oriented Show	Won	
2004	18th PMPC Star Awards for TV	Philippine Movie Press Club	The Buzz	Best Showbiz-oriented Show	Won	
2004	18th PMPC Star Awards for TV	Philippine Movie Press Club	Boy Abunda	Best Male Showbiz-oriented Show	Won	
2004	18th PMPC Star Awards for TV	Philippine Movie Press Club	Kris Aquino	Best Female Showbiz-oriented Show	Won	
2003	17th PMPC Star Awards for TV	Philippine Movie Press Club	The Buzz	Best Showbiz-oriented Show	Won	
2003	17th PMPC Star Awards for TV	Philippine Movie Press Club	Boy Abunda	Best Male Showbiz-oriented Show	Won	
2003	17th PMPC Star Awards for TV	Philippine Movie Press Club	Kris Aquino	Best Female Showbiz-oriented Show	Nominated	
2002	16th PMPC Star Awards for TV	Philippine Movie Press Club	The Buzz	Best Showbiz-oriented Show	Nominated	
2002	16th PMPC Star Awards for TV	Philippine Movie Press Club	Boy Abunda	Best Male Showbiz-oriented Show	Won	
2002	16th PMPC Star Awards for TV	Philippine Movie Press Club	Kris Aquino	Best Female Showbiz-oriented Show	Won	
2001	15th PMPC Star Awards for TV	Philippine Movie Press Club	The Buzz	Best Showbiz-oriented Show	Won	
2001	15th PMPC Star Awards for TV	Philippine Movie Press Club	Boy Abunda	Best Male Showbiz-oriented Show	Won	
2001	15th PMPC Star Awards for TV	Philippine Movie Press Club	Kris Aquino	Best Female Showbiz-oriented Show	Won	
2000	14th PMPC Star Awards for TV	Philippine Movie Press Club	The Buzz	Best Showbiz-oriented Show	Won	
2000	14th PMPC Star Awards for TV	Philippine Movie Press Club	Boy Abunda	Best Male Showbiz-oriented Show	Won	
2000	14th PMPC Star Awards for TV	Philippine Movie Press Club	Kris Aquino	Best Female Showbiz-oriented Show	Won	

== See also ==
- List of programs broadcast by ABS-CBN
