= Paparazzi (talk show) =

- Also known as: Paparazzi Showbiz Exposed
- Genre: Talk show
- Created by: TV5
- Presented by: Cristy Fermin; Dolly Ann Carvajal; Zoren Legaspi; Jeffrey "Mr. Fu" Espiritu
- Country of origin: Philippines
- Original language: Filipino
- No. of episodes: 120

Production
- Editor: Sam Creencia
- Running time: 30-60 minutes

Original release
- Network: TV5
- Release: April 11, 2010 – July 28, 2012

Related
- Ang Latest

Paparazzi, fully titled as Paparazzi Showbiz Exposed, was a Philippine showbiz oriented talk show, of TV5 which airs every Sunday afternoons. The show broadcasts live from Studio B of TV5 Complex.

On May 22, 2011, the show's timeslot was changed from 2:30pm to 4:00pm. On June 5, 2011, its original timeslot throughout its run was 4:00pm. On February 11, 2012, the show's timeslot was changed at 1:30pm.

The show gained positive reviews and critical acclaim and feedback by international followers because of its advances in the global talk through social media sites and websites available to watch with proper use of the program.

== Hosts ==
=== Final hosts ===
- Cristy Fermin (2010–12)
- Dolly Ann Carvajal (2010–12)
- Zoren Legaspi (2011–12)
- Mariel Rodriguez (2012)

=== Segment hosts ===
- Mr. Fu (Paparazzada)

=== Former hosts ===
- Hayden Kho (2010–11)
- Mo Twister (2010–11)
- Ruffa Gutierrez (2010–12)

=== Guest hosts ===
- Alice Dixson
- Lucy Torres-Gomez
- Precious Lara Quigaman

== Segments ==
- Caught by Cristy
- Hello Dolly
- Paparazzada
- Paparazzi Exclusive

=== Recurring segments ===
- PressCon Express (Press Conference)

=== Discontinued segments ===
- Ruffa Reveals
- Extreme Close-Up
- Confirmed or Denied
- Hulala (Blind Item)
- Bulong ng Palad

== See also ==
- List of programs aired by TV5 (Philippine TV network)
