= Kris Aquino filmography =

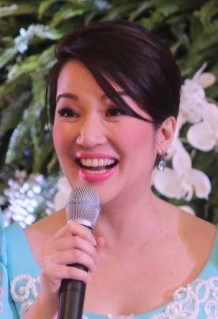
Aquino at APEC Philippines 2015

Kris Aquino is a Filipina television host, actress, endorser and producer.

1990 was the start of her film career. Her mother, the late Corazon Aquino did not want to her to enter showbiz at first, but was later convinced and approved Kris' first film, Pido Dida: Sabay Tayo with the comedian Rene Requiestas, with her achieving mainstream popularity. She later shifted into other roles, notably in "massacre" films such as The Vizconde Massacre, The Myrna Diones Story, Elsa Castillo... Ang Katotohanan, and Humanda Ka Mayor!. Kris' biggest break in the entertainment film industry was her Mano Po series where she won numerous awards for Best Supporting Actress. After that, her films became blockbusters, especially when she shifted into horror films starting from Feng Shui, Sukob and a lot more. Since 2010, she started co-producing her films (Dalaw, Segunda Mano, and Sisterakas) until she established her own production firm in 2013, K Productions with its debut movie Instant Mommy. In 2013, she starred in My Little Bossings with her son Bimby Aquino Yap, Vic Sotto, and Ryzza Mae Dizon. 2014 was the year when the sequel of the blockbuster hit movie Feng Shui was released.

In 2015, she starred in the romantic drama film Etiquette for Mistresses, based on the 1993 novel of the same name, as well as All You Need Is Pag-Ibig, which was an official entry to the 41st Metro Manila Film Festival.

1986 was the start of her television career, she first appeared on Inday Badiday's See True. With her film career slowing, Aquino shifted her sights to a television career as a talk show host and gossiper with the launching of Kris, produced by Viva Television on Channel 4 (at that time named PTV, it was transferred to GMA Network, which had a partnership with Viva, and after Viva's contract with PTV ended). It was on GMA Network's showbiz oriented talk show Startalk, which she co-hosted with Boy Abunda and Lolit Solis, that her hosting skills attracted attention. After GMA Network and VIVA dropped her, she went back to ABS-CBN in 1996 and had her biggest break through the morning talk show Today with Kris Aquino. From that show, she gained more popularity in terms of hosting. From January 2001 to May 2002, she hosted the talk show Morning Girls with Kris and Korina, alongside popular broadcast journalist Korina Sanchez, which was intended to last for only two weeks, but went on for 16 months. In 2004, she starred in her very first teleserye Hiram. In 2007, she officially left The Buzz and Pilipinas, Game KNB? after giving birth to her second son, James. She was replaced by Edu Manzano on Pilipinas, Game KNB?. According to Aquino, she had to give up her hosting stint on the shows to devote more time to her live-in partners. She may not have wanted to return to The Buzz because she no longer wanted to work with former co-host Cristy Fermin. Aquino hosted the Philippine franchise of Deal or No Deal, which is part of ABS-CBN's primetime lineup. It ended its first season on 23 February 2007. The second season of the game show started on 11 June 2007. She hosted Boy and Kris, a morning talk show. She hosted another TV franchise, Wheel of Fortune, which replaced Kapamilya, Deal or No Deal. In October 2008, after former The Buzz co-host Cristy Fermin was suspended by ABS-CBN, the Kapamilya network asked Aquino to once again host the top-rated showbiz-oriented talk show with Boy Abunda and Ruffa Gutierrez. After much controversy, Aquino hosted The Buzz again beginning on 26 October 2008. In 2009, she hosted Pinoy Bingo Night and The Price Is Right in 2011.

She was a resident judge of Pilipinas Got Talent from seasons 1-4 (2010–2013). She officially left SNN: Showbiz News Ngayon on 25 June 2010, and The Buzz on 27 June 2010, after being an on-and-off main host of the show for 10 years. Despite taking a leave for her family, she hosted ABS-CBN's new noontime variety show called Pilipinas Win Na Win. Aquino hosted her morning talk show entitled Kris TV since 2011 until 2016 when she officially taking a hiatus in the showbiz industry and leave ABS-CBN.

Kris TV and All You Need Is Pag-Ibig are her last screen appearances to date. She is set to be back on TV through Trip ni Kris to be aired on GMA Network in 2017.

== Film ==
Year	Title	Role	Notes
1990	Pido Dida: Sabay Tayo	Dida	
1990	Pangako ng Puso	Jenny	
1991	Shake, Rattle & Roll III	Tanya	Segment: "Yaya"
1991	Pido Dida 2: Kasal Na	Dida	
1991	Magic to Win 5	Kathy	Also known as Happy Ghost V
1992	Ang Siga at ang Sosyal	Candace	
1992	Mahal Kita Walang Iba	Trixie	
1992	My Funny Valentine	Laura	
1993	The Vizconde Massacre: God, Help Us!	Carmela Vizconde	
1993	Pido Dida 3: May Kambal Na	Dida	
1993	The Myrna Diones Story: Lord, Have Mercy!	Myrna Diones	
1993	Humanda Ka Mayor!: Bahala Na ang Diyos	Christine	
1994	Tasya Fantasya	Tasya	
1994	Elsa Castillo Story ...Ang Katotohanan	Elsa Castillo	
1994	Geron Olivar	Susan	
1994	Nandito Ako	Marissa	
1994	Bakit Pa Kita Minahal	Lea	
1994	The Fatima Buen Story	Fatima Buen	Nominated – Gawad Urian Award for Best Actress
1995	Saan Ako Nagkamali	Teresa Alban	
1998	Hiwaga ng Panday	Emily	
2002	Mano Po	Juliet Go-Co	Supporting role, FAMAS Award for Best Supporting Actress; Gawad PASADO Award for Best Supporting Actress; KAPPT Award for Best Supporting Actress; Metro Manila Film Festival Award for Best Supporting Actress; Star Awards for Movies for Movie Supporting Actress of the Year; Nominated – Gawad Urian Award for Best Supporting Actress
2003	You and Me Against the World	Diana Rivero	
2003	Mano Po 2: My Home	Young Sol Tan	
2004	Feng Shui	Joy Ramirez	Main role, Nominated – FAMAS Award for Best Actress
2004	So... Happy Together	Lianne Vergara	
2006	Sukob	Sandy	
2009	Mano Po 6: A Mother's Love	Vivian Go-Chan	
2010	Noy	Herself/Cameo	Special participation
2010	Dalaw	Stella	
2011	Segunda Mano	Mabel Domingo	Nominated – FAMAS Award for Best Actress
2012	Sisterakas	Roselle Hermosa	Main role, official MMFF 2012 entry
2013	My Little Bossings	Barbara "Baba" Atienza	Main role, Official MMFF 2013 entry
2014	Feng Shui 2	Joy Ramirez	Main role, Official MMFF 2014 entry
2015	Etiquette for Mistresses	Georgia Torres	Second movie with Claudine Barretto and Claudine's movie comeback with Star Cinema
2015	All You Need Is Pag-Ibig	Love	Main role, official MMFF 2015 entry
2018	I Love You, Hater	Sasha Imperial	Main role

=== Cameo appearances ===
Year	Title	Role	Director
2000	Eto Na Naman Ako	Herself	Ike Jarlego Jr.
2002	Jologs	Herself	Gilbert Perez
2002	Dekada '70	Student leader	Chito S. Rono
2012	Kimmy Dora and the Temple of Kiyeme	Herself	Joyce Bernal
2013	Bromance: My Brother's Romance	Doctor	Wenn V. Deramas
2014	The Amazing Praybeyt Benjamin	Krissy	Wenn V. Deramas
2018	Crazy Rich Asians	Princess Intan	Jon M. Chu

== Television ==
=== Entertainment talk shows ===
Year	Title	Role	Notes
1986	See True	Herself	First TV appearance
1989	Eye to Eye	Herself	Substitute hosts
1994–1996	Actually, 'Yun Na!	Herself	Host
1995–1996	Startalk	Herself	Host
1996	Kris	Herself	Host
1996–2001	Today with Kris Aquino	Herself	Host
2000–2010; 2014–2015	The Buzz	Herself	Host
2001	Kris and Tell	Herself	Host
2002–2004	Morning Girls	Herself	Host: Replacing title: Morning Girls with Kris and Korina
2004	Good Morning, Kris	Herself	Host
2007–2009	Boy & Kris	Herself	Host
2009–2010	SNN: Showbiz News Ngayon	Herself	Anchor
2011–2016	Kris TV	Herself	Host
2016	Yan ang Morning!	Herself	Guest
2017	Trip ni Kris	Herself	Host

=== Variety shows ===
Year	Title	Role	Notes
1986	The Penthouse Live!	Herself	Substitute Host with Louie Heredia during Martin Nievera and Pops Fernandez honeymoon days
1986–1992	GMA Supershow	Herself	Co host
1988–1989; 2013;2026	Eat Bulaga!	Herself	Co-host; Guest
1995–1996	'Sang Linggo nAPO Sila	Herself	Co-host
1995–2004	ASAP	Herself	Host (temporary relief)
2009	Wowowee	Herself	Guest Host (fill-in for Willie Revillame)
2010	Pilipinas Win na Win	Herself	Host

=== Game shows ===
Year	Title	Role	Notes
2001–2007	Game KNB?	Herself	Host: Replacing titles: Smart KNB? Million Million na! Game KNB? Next Level Na! Game KNB? Pasko Na, Game KNB? Pilipinas, Game KNB?
2006–2009	Kapamilya, Deal or No Deal	Herself	Host
2008	Wheel of Fortune	Herself	Host
2009	Pinoy Bingo Night	Herself	Host
2011	The Price Is Right	Herself	Host

=== Teleserye ===
Year	Title	Role	Notes
1993	The Maricel Drama Special: Sister of the Bride	Miriam	with Maricel Soriano
2001	Maalaala Mo Kaya: Lapida	Annie	with Phillip Salvador
2004–2005	Hiram	Diana Benipayo	Main role teleserye
2008	Sineserye Presents: Patayin sa Sindak si Barbara	Barbara	Main role
2010	Kung Tayo'y Magkakalayo	Celine J. Crisanto	Main role
2010	Maalaala Mo Kaya: "Kalapati"	Herself	Love story of Corazon Aquino and Ninoy Aquino
2013	Kailangan Ko'y Ikaw	Roxanne Manrique	Main role

=== Current affairs/News ===
Year	Title	Role	Notes
1992–1994	Hoy Gising!	Herself	Segment host
2001	Balitang Kris	Herself	Host
2014–2015	Aquino & Abunda Tonight	Herself	Host

=== Reality/Talent shows ===
Year	Title	Role	Notes
2010	Pilipinas Got Talent (season 1)	Herself	Judge
2010	Showtime	Herself	Judge
2011	Pilipinas Got Talent (season 2)	Herself	Judge
2011	Pilipinas Got Talent (season 3)	Herself	Judge
2013	Pilipinas Got Talent (season 4)	Herself	Judge

=== Comedy/Sitcom ===
Year	Title	Role	Notes
1990–1992	Luv Ko Si Kris	Herself	Main role
1999–2001	Pwedeng Pwede	Chedy	Main cast
2013	Vampire ang Daddy Ko	Herself	Guest

=== TV specials/Documentaries ===
Year	Title	Role	Notes
1988	One For The Heart	Herself	Performer for the IBC 13's relaunch special
1989	Kris at 18	Herself	TV special of Aquino's 18th birthday celebration
2003	Meteor Fever in Manila	Herself	Host; TV special
2007	Be Bench/ The Model Search	Herself	Host
2009	Salamat President Cory	Herself	The ABS-CBN TV specials on the Kapamilya vigil, funeral, legacy and burial of late president Corazon Aquino.
2009	Laban ni Cory	Herself	The ABS-CBN TV specials on the Kapamilya vigil, funeral, legacy and burial of late president Corazon Aquino.
2009	Salamat President Cory: Huling Paalam	Herself	The ABS-CBN TV specials on the Kapamilya vigil, funeral, legacy and burial of late president Corazon Aquino.
2009	Salamat President Cory: A People's Farewell	Herself	The ABS-CBN TV specials on the Kapamilya vigil, funeral, legacy and burial of late president Corazon Aquino.
2009	Last Journey of Ninoy Documentary Special	Herself	TV special
2014	Ako si Ninoy	Herself	TV documentary of her dad Benigno Aquino Jr.
2014	Dingdong & Marian Wedding Special	Herself	as a Principal Sponsor of Marian Rivera and Dingdong Dantes
