= 2001 in Philippine television =

The following is a list of events affecting Philippine television in 2001. Events listed include television show debuts, finales, cancellations, and channel launches, closures and rebrandings, as well as information about controversies and carriage disputes.

== Events ==
=== January ===
- January 17–20 - running coverage of the Second EDSA Revolution of 2001 takes place in all national television stations, with RPN, ABS-CBN and GMA's regional stations broadcasting highlights of the concurrent regional rallies in their local newscasts.

=== February ===
- February 12: Noli de Castro steps down as anchorman of TV Patrol (as entering first time in the politics, when he ran and won in the 2001 senate elections) and he was temporarily replaced by Henry Omaga-Diaz by next day and then later with Korina Sanchez and Aljo Bendijo on 12 March.

=== April ===
- April 22: Dream Satellite TV launched as the country's first DTH satellite TV provider and commenced commercial services, until its closure in 2017.

=== June ===
- June 11: The launching of Ang Tamang Daan telecasted on DWCP-TV (SBN-21).

=== November ===
- November 7: Actress Nida Blanca was killed in a parking lot in San Juan.

=== December ===
- December 8: An unknown contestant won the jackpot prize of one million pesos on Eat Bulaga!'s Laban o Bawi.

== Premieres ==
Date	Show
January 29	Survivor: The Australian Outback on Studio 23
February 9	City of Angels on RPN 9
February 11	Bitoy’s World on GMA 7
February 11	GMA Telesine Special on GMA 7
February 12	F on ABC 5
February 13	2 Years Vacation w/ Dinosaurs on ABC 5
February 14	Larawan: A Special Drama Engagement on GMA 7
February 14	Pygmalio on ABC 5
February 15	Fancy Lala on ABC 5
February 16	Restol on ABC 5
March 3	Da Body en da Guard on ABS-CBN 2
March 5	Special Assignment on ABC 5
March 6	That '70s Show on ABC 5
March 6	Saklolo Abugado on IBC 13
March 7	Planet X on ABC 5
March 7	Philippines' Most Wanted on ABC 5
March 9	Working on ABC 5
March 9	Normal, Ohio on ABC 5
March 10	Saturday Night Specials on ABC 5
March 12	Talk TV on ABS-CBN 2
March 12	Camila on ABS-CBN 2
March 12	Balitang Kris on ABS-CBN 2
March 12	Biglang Sibol, Bayang Impasibol on GMA 7
March 12	Oras ng Katotohanan on IBC 13
March 26	Ikaw Lang ang Mamahalin on GMA 7
March 26	Sa Dulo ng Walang Hanggan on ABS-CBN 2
April 1	Eto Na Ang Susunod Na Kabanata on ABS-CBN 2
April 2	New Day @ PTV on PTV 4
April 4	Kabalikat: Loren Legarda on ABS-CBN 2
April 20	Nikki on RPN 9
April 21	S.I.M. Scandals, Intrigues, Mysteries on ABS-CBN 2
April 22	Off the Record on ABS-CBN 2
April 23	The Powerpuff Girls on GMA 7
April 24	Johnny Bravo on GMA 7
April 30	Blue's Clues on GMA 7
May 7	Soul Hunter on ABS-CBN 2
May 8	Mission X on ABS-CBN 2
May 9	Verum EST: Totoo Ba Ito? on ABS-CBN 2
May 11	True Crime on ABS-CBN 2
May 14	Recuerdo de Amor on ABS-CBN 2
May 15	After War Gundam X on GMA 7
June 4	Kris & Tell on ABS-CBN 2
June 4	TV Patrol Bacolod on ABS-CBN TV-4 Bacolod
June 4	TV Patrol Iloilo on ABS-CBN TV-10 Iloilo
June 11	Ang Tamang Daan on Net 25/SBN 21
June 18	Sa Puso Ko, Iingatan Ka on ABS-CBN 2
June 18	Your Honor on ABS-CBN 2
July 9	Monica Brava on GMA 7
July 12	Daddy Di Do Du on GMA 7
July 16	Sigaw: The Campus Debate Series on NBN 4
July 16	Teledyaryo on NBN 4
July 16	NBN Network News on NBN 4
July 16	NBN News Live on NBN 4
July 17	Shop @ Home on NBN 4
July 17	Pulsong Masa on NBN 4
July 17	Business Insights on NBN 4
July 18	Diyos at Bayan on NBN 4
July 20	Unlimited Diving on NBN 4
July 21	Ang Iglesia ni Cristo on NBN 4
July 21	Tipanan sa Barangay on NBN 4
July 21	Balikatan sa Bahay at Buhay on NBN 4
July 21	Saturday Primetime Special on NBN 4
July 21	The Bodyguards on NBN 4
July 21	Explore with Mike on NBN 4
July 22	Out of Town on NBN 4
July 22	China Today on NBN 4
July 22	In This Corner on NBN 4
July 22	Sunday’s Big Showdown on NBN 4
July 22	Business and Leisure on NBN 4
July 23	Cardcaptor Sakura on ABS-CBN 2
July 23	Tres mujeres on ABS-CBN 2
August 3	Digimon Adventure 02 on ABS-CBN 2
August 12	Entertainment Tonight on RPN 9
August 13	Real TV on RPN 9
August 13	Becker on RPN 9
August 13	Arliss on RPN 9
August 13	NewsWatch Now on RPN 9
August 14	Ed on RPN 9
August 15	Level 9 on RPN 9
August 16	Clueless on RPN 9
August 17	That's Life on RPN 9
August 18	Star Trek: The Next Generation on RPN 9
August 27	Sis on GMA 7
September 3	Fox News on NBN 4
September 3	PGMA Documentary on NBN 4
September 4	Batang Pinoy on NBN 4
September 6	Shoot Fest on IBC 13
September 7	Patrol 117 on NBN 4
September 8	May Gloria ang Bukas Mo on NBN 4
September 10	Detective Conan on GMA 7
September 10	Por un beso on IBC 13
September 12	Carita de Ángel on IBC 13
September 12	Whattamen on ABS-CBN 2
September 13	Attagirl on ABS-CBN 2
September 15	Da Pilya en da Pilot on ABS-CBN 2
September 15	Mary D' Potter on ABS-CBN 2
September 27	Sa Dako Pa Roon on GMA 7
October 1	Viva Box Office on IBC 13
October 8	Hamos, The Green Chariot on ABS-CBN 2
October 8	Game Ka Na Ba? on ABS-CBN 2
October 8	Carita Pintada on GMA 7
October 10	Jessica Soho Reports on GMA 7
October 12	Survivor: Africa on Studio 23
October 15	The Weakest Link on IBC 13
October 22	FPJ Action Cinema on ABS-CBN 2
November 5	Betty La Fea on GMA 7
November 5	Korek na Korek Ka Dyan! on GMA 7
November 17	Sapul Kayo D'yan! on ABS-CBN 2
November 19	Wheel of Fortune on ABC 5
November 19	Family Feud on ABC 5
November 19	Sorcerer Hunters on GMA 7
November 25	The Price Is Right on ABC 5
November 26	Magic Knight Rayearth on GMA 7
December 3	Sana ay Ikaw na Nga on GMA 7
December 25	Twin Signal on GMA 7

=== Unknown dates ===
- January: The Working President on PTV 4/RPN 9/IBC 13
- July: NBN Special Coverage on NBN 4

=== Unknown ===
- Strangebrew on UNTV 37/PTV 4
- In the Raw on UNTV 37/NBN 4
- Side Stitch on ABC 5
- Amazing Lifestyle on SBN 21
- Oras ng Himala on SBN 21
- Armor of God on RJTV 29
- Paliwanagan on IBC 13
- Musika Atbp. on IBC 13
- Travel and Trade on IBC 13
- This is Your Day on IBC 13
- Maria del Cielo on IBC 13
- The Gospel of the Kingdom with Pastor Apollo C. Quiboloy on IBC 13
- Txtube on GMA 7
- MariMar on GMA 7
- Princess Sissi on GMA 7
- Inspector Gadget on GMA 7
- Spider-Man Unlimited on GMA 7
- Pocket Dragon Adventures on GMA 7
- Genshiken on GMA 7
- Xyber 9: New Dawn on GMA 7
- Avengers on GMA 7
- Fushigi Yûgi on GMA 7
- Lupin the Third on GMA 7
- Ghost Fighter on GMA 7
- Superman Unlimited on GMA 7
- Attack of the Killer Tomatoes on GMA 7
- Space Goofs on GMA 7
- The Little Mermaid on GMA 7
- DuckTales on GMA 7
- Recess on GMA 7
- Quack Pack on GMA 7
- Spider-Man on GMA 7
- Let's & Go!! on GMA 7
- Linawin Natin on IBC 13
- Liwanagin Natin on Net 25
- Quigley's Village on ZOE TV 11
- Alicia on ABS-CBN 2
- Gingaman on ABS-CBN 2
- Ultraman Gaia on ABS-CBN 2
- TV Patrol Mindanao on ABS-CBN TV-4 Davao
- Life with Roger on ABC 5
- Mad TV on ABC 5
- Maha Go! Go! Go! (Speed Racer X) on ABC 5
- Normal, Ohio on ABC 5
- Star Trek: Voyager on ABC 5
- That '70s Show on ABC 5
- Time Quest on ABC 5
- Computer Chronicles on Net 25
- Con Todos Recados on Net 25
- Fresh Gear on Net 25
- Net 25 Report on Net 25
- NET Café on Net 25
- Oakie Doke on Net 25
- Our House on Net 25
- Play Music Videos on Net 25
- The New Yankee Workshop on Net 25
- The Screen Savers on Net 25
- Wheel 2000 on Net 25
- World Report Early Edition on Net 25
- World Report Filipino Edition on Net 25
- www.com on Net 25
- The Scene on RPN 9
- Arangkada sa Nueve Davao on RPN 9 Davao
- The Doctor Is In on RPN 9
- Kapiterya Pinoy on RPN 9
- Cooking.Com on RPN 9
- What Would Jesus Do? on RPN 9
- Body & Machine on RPN 9
- Sin ti on RPN 9
- Kapayapaan Atin Ito on NBN 4
- Patrol 112 on NBN 4
- Ugnayang Pambansa on NBN 4
- Take Four on NBN 4
- In This Corner on NBN 4
- NBA Action on NBN 4
- NBA Inside Stuff on NBN 4
- NBA Jam on NBN 4

== Returning or renamed programs ==
Show	Last aired	Retitled as/Season/Notes	Channel	Return date
Philippine Basketball Association	2000 (season 26: "Governors' Cup")	Same (season 27: "All-Filipino Cup")	IBC	January 28
Survivor	2000 (season 1: "Borneo")	Same (season 2: "The Australian Outback")	Studio 23	January 29
Philippine Basketball League	2001 (season 18: "Challenge Cup")	Same (season 18: "Alaxan-Chairman's Cup")	PTV (now NBN)	March 24
Philippine Basketball Association	2001 (season 27: "All-Filipino' Cup")	Same (season 27: "Commissioner's Cup")	IBC	June 2
Metropolitan Basketball Association	2000 (Studio 23)	Same (2001 season)	PTV (now NBN)	June 3
National Collegiate Athletic Association	2001	Same (season 77)	PTV (now NBN)	July 7
University Athletic Association of the Philippines	2001	Same (season 64)	Studio 23	July
Special Coverage	2001 (PTV)	NBN Special Coverage	NBN	July
Philippine Basketball Association	2001 (season 27: "Commissioner's Cup")	Same (season 27: "Governors' Cup")	IBC	September 8
Survivor	2001 (season 2: "The Australian Outback")	Same (season 3: "Thailand")	Studio 23	October 12
FPJ sa GMA	1995 (GMA)	FPJ Action Cinema	ABS-CBN	October 22
Philippine Basketball League	2001 (PTV; season 18: "Alaxan-Chairman's Cup")	Same (season 19: "Alaxan-Challenge Cup")	NBN	November 3
National Basketball Association	2001 (IBC)	Same (2001–02 season)	NBN	November

== Programs transferring networks ==
Date	Show	No. of seasons	Moved from	Moved to
June 3	Metropolitan Basketball Association	4	Studio 23	PTV (now NBN)
July 18	Diyos at Bayan	—N/a	RPN	NBN
October 22	FPJ sa GMA	—N/a	GMA	ABS-CBN (as FPJ Action Cinema)
November	National Basketball Association	56	IBC	NBN
November 19	Sorcerer Hunters	—N/a	ABS-CBN	GMA
November 26	Magic Knight Rayearth	—N/a	ABS-CBN	GMA
Unknown	Musika Atbp.	—N/a	ABC	IBC
Unknown	Maria del Cielo	—N/a	RPN	IBC
Unknown	Time Quest	—N/a	IBC	ABC
Unknown	Inspector Gadget	—N/a	IBC	GMA

== Finales ==
- February 2: The Truth and Nothing But (RPN 9)
- February 7: GMA Drama Studio Presents (GMA 7)
- February 9: What Went Wrong? (GMA 7)
- February 17: Star Drama Presents (ABS-CBN 2)
- March 3: Saturday Night Movies (ABC 5)
- March 9:
  - Rio Del Mar (GMA 7)
  - Today with Kris Aquino (ABS-CBN 2)
  - Daniela's Diary (ABS-CBN 2)
  - Hoy Gising! (ABS-CBN 2)
  - Balitang K (ABS-CBN 2)
- March 19: Tuwing Kapiling Ka (GMA 7)
- March 22: Bubblegum Crisis Tokyo 2040 (GMA 7)
- March 23:
  - Saan Ka Man Naroroon (ABS-CBN 2)
  - Trigun (GMA 7)
- March 25: Richard Loves Lucy (ABS-CBN 2)
- March 30: Good Morning, Pilipinas (PTV 4)
- April 20: Wataru (GMA 7)
- April 27: Teletubbies (GMA 7)
- May 3: Assignment (ABS-CBN 2)
- May 4:
  - May Bukas Pa (RPN 9)
  - Julie (ABS-CBN 2)
  - Survivor: The Australian Outback (Studio 23)
- May 11:
  - Marinella (ABS-CBN 2)
  - Genshiken (GMA 7)
- May 26: H2K: Hati-Hating Kapatid (IBC 13)
- May 30: Subic Bay (IBC 13)
- June 1: TV Patrol Western Visayas (ABS-CBN TV-4 Bacolod and ABS-CBN TV-10 Iloilo)
- July 5: 1 for 3 (GMA 7)
- July 13:
  - New Day @ PTV (PTV 4)
  - Pambansang Balita Ala-Una (PTV 4)
  - Pambansang Balita Ala-Sais (PTV 4)
  - Cartoon Hour (PTV 4)
  - National Network News (PTV 4)
- July 14: Battle of the Brains (PTV 4)
- July 15: News Flash sa 4 (PTV 4)
- July 27: Digimon Adventure (ABS-CBN 2)
- August 10: Primetime Balita (RPN 9)
- August 24: D Day (GMA 7)
- September 3:
  - Kaya ni Mister, Kaya ni Misis (ABS-CBN 2)
  - Judy Ann Drama Special (ABS-CBN 2)
- September 4: Regal Presents (ABS-CBN 2)
- September 7:
  - Camila (ABS-CBN 2)
  - Mystic Knights of Tir Na Nog (ABS-CBN 2)
  - After War Gundam X (GMA 7)
  - Global News (ABS-CBN 2)
- September 8: Da Boy en Da Guard (ABS-CBN 2)
- September 9: Eto Na Ang Susunod Na Kabanata (ABS-CBN 2)
- September 10: Kiss Muna (GMA 7)
- September 29: Brigada Siete (GMA 7)
- October 1: Simsala Grimm (ABS-CBN 2)
- October 5:
  - Bayani (ABS-CBN 2)
  - Camila (ABS-CBN 2)
  - Ranma ½ (GMA 7)
- October 16: Pwedeng Pwede (ABS-CBN 2)
- October 18: Kabalikat: Loren Legarda (ABS-CBN 2)
- October 21: Pinoy Exposèd (ABS-CBN 2)
- October 27: Keep on Dancing (ABS-CBN 2)
- November 2: Kirara, Ano ang Kulay ng Pag-ibig? (GMA 7)
- November 3: Campus Video (GMA 7)
- November 12: Action Theater (ABC 5)
- November 16: Dragon Ball Z (GMA 7)
- November 18: Sunday Night Movies (ABC 5)
- November 23: Detective Conan (GMA 7)
- November 30: Sa Dako Pa Roon (GMA 7)
- December 26: Larawan: A Special Drama Engagement (GMA 7)

=== Unknown dates ===
- January: The Estrada Presidency (PTV 4/RPN 9/IBC 13)
- February: Saklolo Abugado (IBC 13)
- July:
  - Special Coverage (PTV 4)
  - Diyos at Bayan (RPN 9)

=== Unknown ===
- Komentaryo (PTV 4)
- Tipanan sa Barangay (NBN 4)
- Street Legal (PTV 4)
- Online Bingo Filipino (PTV 4)
- Fora Medica (PTV 4)
- Inside NCAA (PTV 4)
- Jai Alai: The Game of a Thousand Thrills (PTV 4)
- Sports Kids (PTV 4)
- Powerline (PTV 4)
- The Hour of Truth (PTV 4)
- Uncut: Movie in the Making (PTV 4)
- Business Class (RPN 9)
- Compañero y Compañera (RPN 9)
- Kakampi (RPN 9)
- Newslight (RPN 9)
- Sa Bayan... (RPN 9)
- The Scene (RPN 9)
- Arangkada sa Nueve Davao (RPN 9 Davao)
- Penpen de Sarapen (RPN 9)
- Better Home Ideas (RPN 9)
- The Greatest Fights (RPN 9)
- The Truth And Nothing But (RPN 9)
- Maria del Cielo (RPN 9)
- Quinceañera (RPN 9)
- Serafín (RPN 9)
- Siempre te amaré (RPN 9)
- Princess Sissi (GMA 7)
- Cow and Chicken (GMA 7)
- Takoyaki Mantleman (GMA 7)
- Gadget Boy Kanipan (GMA 7)
- Vision of Escaflowne (GMA 7)
- Virtua Fighter (GMA 7)
- Inspector Gadget (GMA 7)
- Pocket Dragon Adventures (GMA 7)
- Xyber 9: New Dawn (GMA 7)
- Avengers (GMA 7)
- The Powerpuff Girls (GMA 7)
- Johnny Bravo (GMA 7)
- Eerie, Indiana (GMA 7)
- Ninja Turtles: The Next Mutation (GMA 7)
- Stickin' Around (GMA 7)
- Knight Hunters (GMA 7)
- Open Sesame (GMA 7)
- Superman Unlimited (GMA 7)
- Attack of the Killer Tomatoes (GMA 7)
- Space Goofs (GMA 7)
- The Little Mermaid (GMA 7)
- Mickey Mouse Works (GMA 7)
- Goof Troop (GMA 7)
- DuckTales (GMA 7)
- Spider-Man (GMA 7)
- Spider-Man Unlimited (GMA 7)
- Balitang Kris (ABS-CBN 2)
- Barangay Dos (ABS-CBN 2)
- Da Body en da Guard (ABS-CBN 2)
- Katapat, Fred Lim (ABS-CBN 2)
- Kontrapelo (ABS-CBN 2)
- Kris & Tell (ABS-CBN 2)
- Loren (ABS-CBN 2)
- Pahina (ABS-CBN 2)
- S.I.M. Scandals, Intrigues, Mysteries (ABS-CBN 2)
- El Hazard The Mysterious World (The Wonderers) (ABS-CBN 2)
- Hamos, The Green Chariot (ABS-CBN 2)
- Megaranger (ABS-CBN 2)
- Soul Hunter (ABS-CBN 2)
- Young Hercules (ABS-CBN 2)
- OPS-PIA: Ugnayan sa Hotel Rembrandt (RPN 9/IBC 13)
- Paliwanagan (IBC 13)
- Saklolo Abugado (IBC 13)
- Gags Must Be Crazy (IBC 13)
- Last Fool Show (IBC 13)
- Klik na Klik sa Trese (IBC 13)
- National Super Quiz Bee (IBC 13)
- Bayan ni Juan (IBC 13)
- Thursday Night at the Movies (IBC 13)
- Viva Premiere Night (IBC 13)
- Viva Proudly Presents (IBC 13)
- Oras ng Himala (IBC 13)
- Beetle Fighters Platinum (IBC 13)
- Robotack (IBC 13)
- Zyurangers (IBC 13)
- Bubu Chacha (IBC 13)
- GMA Drama Studio Presents (GMA 7)
- Kahit na Magtiis (GMA 7)
- What Went Wrong? (GMA 7)
- The Pulpit of Christ (GMA 7)
- SBN Live (SBN 21)
- Niño Felipin (ABS-CBN 2)
- Paulina (ABS-CBN 2)
- Pura sangre (ABS-CBN 2)
- South Park (Channel V Philippines)
- TV Patrol Davao (ABS-CBN TV-4 Davao)
- Beach Patrol (ABC 5)
- Chicago Sons (ABC 5)
- Diagnosis: Murder (ABC 5)
- Hercules: The Legendary Journeys (ABC 5)
- Masked Rider (ABC 5)
- New York Undercover (ABC 5)
- Sabrina the Teenage Witch (ABC 5)
- Sliders (ABC 5)
- Soldier of Fortune (ABC 5)
- Suddenly Susan (ABC 5)
- Strangers (ABC 5)
- Tarzan (ABC 5)
- Planet 25 Report (Net 25)

==== Stopped airing ====
Program	Channel	Last airing	Resumed airing	Reason
Digimon Adventure 02	ABS-CBN	October 20	April 6, 2002	Series break.

== Channels ==
=== Launches ===
==== Unknown ====
- June: CNBC Asia on ZOE TV

=== Rebranded ===
The following is a list of television stations that have made or will make noteworthy network rebranded in 2001.

Date	Rebranded from	Rebranded to	Channel	Source
May 20	Pinoy Blockbuster Channel	Cinema One	26	
July 16	PTV	NBN	4	

=== Closures ===
Date	Station	Channel	Sign-on debut	Source
July 25	Citynet Television/Channel V Philippines	27	August 27, 1995	

== Births ==
- January 6 - Cassy Legaspi and Mavy Legaspi, actors and hosts
- January 27 - Maraiah Arceta, singer and model
- February 5 - Juan Karlos Labajo, singer and actor
- February 13 - Jelai Pilones, actress
- March 6 - Rere Madrid, actress
- March 18 - Cianne Dominguez, model and host of It's Showtime
- March 21 - Cherryz Mendoza, singer
- March 28 - Missy Quino, actress
- April 27 – Akira Morishita, actor, singer, and member of BGYO
- May 13 - Dustin Yu, actor
- May 24 - Darren Espanto, singer
- June 4 - Shuvee Etrata, actress, model, and host
- June 30 - Amanda Zamora, actress
- August 16 - Lianne Valentin, actress
- August 23 - Zaijian Jaranilla, actor
- August 26 - Zonia Mejia, actress
- September 14 - Nicolette Vergara, singer, dancer and rapper
- October 12 - Therese Lacap
- October 13 - Julian Alturas, Actor
- October 18 - Carlos Dala, actor
- October 21 - Amy Nobleza, musical artist
- November 7 - Grae Fernandez, actor
- December 15 - Jelo The Weirdo, rapper and singer
- December 19 - Mika Gorospe, singer

== Deaths ==
- October 3: Ricky Belmonte – Actor (b. 1947)
- November 7: Nida Blanca – Actress (b. 1936)
- November 23: Maria Teresa Carlson – Actress (b. 1962)

== See also ==
- 2001 in television
