= List of awards and nominations received by Kris Aquino =

List of Kris Aquino awards
- Aquino in 2015.
Award	Wins	Nominations
PMPC Star Awards for Television	42	20
Golden Screen TV Awards	10	0
USTv Students' Choice Awards	5	2
Dangal ng Bayan Awards	1	0
TUA Platinum Stallion Media Awards	2	0
Illumine Innovative Awards	1	0
FAMAS Awards	1	3
GMMSF Box-Office Entertainment Awards	4	0
Metro Manila Film Festival Awards	1	5
Gawad PASADO Awards	2	0
PMPC Star Awards for Movies	1	5
KAPPT Awards	1	0
Gawad Genio Awards	1	0
Anak TV Seal Awards	1	
Rotary Club Golden Wheel Awards	1	
PEP List Editors' Choice	1	
ABS-CBN News Online	2	
Summit Media	1	
EdukCircle Awards	4	
SKAL Tourism Awards	2	0
New York Festival Awards	1	0
Asia Rainbow TV Awards	1	0
Overall	86	35

This is a list of awards and nominations received by Kris Aquino, a Filipina television host, actress, and producer. Overall, Aquino has received 86 awards and 35 nominations, spanning 1991 to 2016.

== Local ==
=== Television ===
==== PMPC Star Awards for Television ====
Year	Category	Notes	Result	Ref
1998	Best Celebrity Talk Show	for Today with Kris Aquino	Won	
1998	Best Celebrity Talk Show Host	for Today with Kris Aquino	Won	
2000	Best Celebrity Talk Show	for Today with Kris Aquino	Won	
2000	Best Celebrity Talk Show Host	for Today with Kris Aquino	Won	
2000	Best Showbiz-Oriented Talk Show	for The Buzz	Won	
2000	Best Female Showbiz-Oriented Talk Show Host	for The Buzz	Won	
2001	Best Showbiz-Oriented Talk Show	for The Buzz	Won	
2001	Best Female Showbiz-Oriented Talk Show Host	for The Buzz	Won	
2002	Best Game Show	for Pilipinas, Game KNB?	Won	
2002	Best Game Show Host	for Pilipinas, Game KNB?	Won	
2002	Best Showbiz-Oriented Talk Show	for The Buzz	Nominated	
2002	Best Female Showbiz-Oriented Talk Show Host	for The Buzz	Won	
2003	Best Game Show	for Pilipinas, Game KNB?	Won	
2003	Best Game Show Host	for Pilipinas, Game KNB?	Won	
2003	Best Celebrity Talk Show	for Morning Girls with Kris and Korina	Won	
2003	Best Celebrity Talk Show Host	for Morning Girls with Kris and Korina (with Korina Sanchez)	Won	
2003	Best Showbiz-Oriented Talk Show	for The Buzz	Won	
2003	Best Female Showbiz-Oriented Talk Show Host	for The Buzz	Won	
2004	Best Game Show	for Pilipinas, Game KNB?	Won	
2004	Best Game Show Host	for Pilipinas, Game KNB?	Nominated	
2004	Best Celebrity Talk Show	for Morning Girls with Kris and Korina	Won	
2004	Best Celebrity Talk Show Host	for Morning Girls with Kris and Korina (with Korina Sanchez)	Won	
2004	Best Showbiz-Oriented Talk Show	for The Buzz	Won	
2004	Best Female Showbiz-Oriented Talk Show Host	for The Buzz	Won	
2005	Best Game Show	for Pilipinas, Game KNB?	Won	
2005	Best Game Show Host	for Pilipinas, Game KNB?	Won	
2005	Best Primtime Drama Series	for Hiram	Nominated	
2005	Best Drama Actress	for Hiram	Nominated	
2005	Best Showbiz-Oriented Talk Show	for The Buzz	Won	
2006	Best Game Show	for Pilipinas, Game KNB?	Won	
2006	Best Game Show Host	for Pilipinas, Game KNB?	Nominated	
2006	Best Showbiz-Oriented Talk Show	for The Buzz	Won	
2006	Best Female Showbiz-Oriented Talk Show Host	for The Buzz	Won	
2007	Best Game Show	for Pilipinas, Game KNB?	Won	
2007	Best Game Show Host	for Pilipinas, Game KNB?	Nominated	
2007	Best Showbiz-Oriented Talk Show	for The Buzz	Won	
2007	Best Female Showbiz-Oriented Talk Show Host	for The Buzz	Nominated	
2008	Best Celebrity Talk Show	for Boy and Kris	Won	
2008	Best Celebrity Talk Show Host	for Boy and Kris (with Boy Abunda)	Won	
2009	Best Game Show Host	for Kapamilya, Deal or No Deal	Nominated	
2009	Best Showbiz-Oriented Talk Show	for SNN: Showbiz News Ngayon	Won	
2009	Best Female Showbiz-Oriented Talk Show Host	for SNN: Showbiz News Ngayon	Nominated	
2009	Best Celebrity Talk Show	for Boy and Kris	Nominated	
2009	Best Celebrity Talk Show Host	for Boy and Kris (with Boy Abunda)	Nominated	
2010	Best Showbiz-Oriented Talk Show	for The Buzz	Won	
2010	Best Female Showbiz-Oriented Talk Show Host	for The Buzz	Nominated	
2012	Best Celebrity Talk Show	for Kris TV	Nominated	
2012	Best Celebrity Talk Show Host	for Kris TV	Won	
2013	Best Celebrity Talk Show	for Kris TV	Won	
2013	Best Celebrity Talk Show Host	for Kris TV	Nominated	
2014	Best Lifestyle Show	for Kris TV	Nominated	
2014	Best Lifestyle Show Host	for Kris TV	Won	
2014	Best Celebrity Talk Show	for Aquino & Abunda Tonight	Nominated	
2014	Best Celebrity Talk Show Host	for Aquino & Abunda Tonight (with Boy Abunda)	Nominated	
2014	Best Showbiz-Oriented Talk Show	for The Buzz	Won	
2014	Best Female Showbiz-Oriented Talk Show Host	for The Buzz	Nominated	
2015	Best Lifestyle Show	for Kris TV	Nominated	
2015	Best Lifestyle Show Host	for Kris TV	Won	
2015	Best Celebrity Talk Show	for Aquino & Abunda Tonight	Won	
2015	Best Celebrity Talk Show Host	for Aquino & Abunda Tonight (with Boy Abunda)	Won	
2015	Best Showbiz-Oriented Talk Show	for The Buzz	Won	
2015	Best Female Showbiz-Oriented Talk Show Host	for The Buzz	Nominated	

==== Golden Screen TV Awards ====
Year	Category	Notes	Result	Ref
2012	Outstanding Lifestyle Program	for Kris TV	Won	
2012	Outstanding Lifestyle Program Host	for Kris TV	Won	
2013	Outstanding Lifestyle Program	for Kris TV	Won	
2013	Outstanding Lifestyle Program Host	for Kris TV	Won	
2014	Outstanding Lifestyle Program	for Kris TV	Won	
2014	Outstanding Lifestyle Program Host	for Kris TV	Won	
2015	Outstanding Lifestyle Program	for Kris TV	Won	
2015	Outstanding Lifestyle Program Host	for Kris TV	Won	
2015	Outstanding Showbiz Talk Program	for The Buzz	Won	
2015	Outstanding Showbiz Talk Program Host	for The Buzz	Won	

==== USTv Students' Choice Awards ====
Year	Category	Notes	Result	Ref
2013	Student's Choice of Best Talk Variety Program Host	for Kris TV	Won	
2014	Student's Choice of Best Talk Show	for Kris TV	Won	
2014	Student's Choice of Best Talk Show Host	for Kris TV	Won	
2015	Student's Choice of Best Magazine Program	for Kris TV	Nominated	
2015	Student's Choice of Best Magazine Program Host	for Kris TV	Nominated	
2016	Student's Choice of Best Magazine Program	for Kris TV	Won	
2016	Student's Choice of Best Magazine Program Host	for Kris TV	Won	

==== Dangal ng Bayan Awards ====
Year	Category	Notes	Result	Ref
2009	Best Female Game Show Host	for Pinoy Bingo Night	Won	

==== TUA Platinum Stallion Media Awards ====
Year	Category	Notes	Result	Ref
2015	Best Female Talk Show Host	for Kris TV, Aquino & Abunda Tonight, The Buzz	Won	
2016	Best Female Talk Show Host	for Kris TV	Won	

==== Illumine Innovative Awards ====
Year	Category	Notes	Result	Ref
2015	Most Innovative Female TV Host	for Kris TV, Aquino & Abunda Tonight	Won	

=== Movies ===
==== FAMAS Awards ====
Year	Category	Notes	Result	Ref
2003	Best Supporting Actress	for Mano Po	Won	
2005	Best Actress	for Feng Shui	Nominated	
2012	Best Actress	for Segunda Mano	Nominated	
2015	Best Actress	for Feng Shui 2	Nominated	

==== GMMSF Box-Office Entertainment Awards ====
Year	Category	Notes	Result	Ref
1991	Box-Office Queen	for Pido Dida: Sabay Tayo	Won	
2005	Box-Office Queen	for Feng Shui	Won	
2007	Box-Office Queen	for Sukob (with Claudine Barretto)	Won	
2013	Phenomenal Box-Office Star	for Sisterakas (with Vice Ganda & Ai-Ai Delas Alas)	Won	

==== Metro Manila Film Festival Awards ====
Year	Category	Notes	Result	Ref
2002	Best Supporting Actress	for Mano Po	Won	

==== Gawad PASADO Awards ====
Year	Category	Notes	Result	Ref
2003	PinakaPASADOng Katuwang na Aktres	for Mano Po	Won	
2007	PinakaPASADOng Aktres	for Sukob	Nominated	
2016	Dangal ng PASADO sa Pangkatang Pagganap ng may Mataas na Papuri	for Etiquette for Mistresses (with Claudine Barretto, Iza Calzado, Kim Chiu, and Cheena Crab)	Won	

==== PMPC Star Awards for Movies ====
Year	Category	Notes	Result	Ref
2003	Supporting Actress of the Year	for Mano Po	Won	

==== KAPPT Awards ====
Year	Category	Notes	Result	Ref
2003	Best Supporting Actress	for Mano Po	Won	

==== Gawad Genio Awards ====
Year	Category	Notes	Result	Ref
2006	Best Actress	for Sukob	Won	

=== Other Fields ===
==== Anak TV Seal Awards ====
Year	Category	Notes	Result	Ref
2009	Most Admired Female Personality	ABS-CBN	Won	

==== Rotary Club Golden Wheel Awards ====
Year	Category	Notes	Result	Ref
2013	Entertainment Personality of the Year	ABS-CBN	Won	

==== PEP List Editors' Choice ====
Year	Category	Notes	Result	Ref
2015	Female Star of the Year	ABS-CBN	Won	

==== ABS-CBN News Online ====
Year	Category	Notes	Result	Ref
2014	Best Dressed Personality	for SONA 2014	Won	
2015	Best Dressed Personality	for SONA 2015	Won	

==== Summit Media ====
Year	Category	Notes	Result	Ref
2015	Most Beautiful Star	ABS-CBN	Won	

==== EdukCircle Awards ====
Year	Category	Notes	Result	Ref
2012	Most Influential Celebrity Endorser of the Year		Won	
2013	Most Influential Celebrity Endorser of the Year		Won	
2014	Most Influential Celebrity Endorser of the Year		Won	
2015	Most Influential Celebrity Endorser of the Year		Won	
2016	Most Influential Celebrity Endorser of the Year		Won	

== International ==
=== Television ===
==== SKAL Tourism Awards ====
Year	Category	Notes	Result	Ref
2015	Tourism Hall of Fame Travel Show	for Kris TV	Won	
2015	Tourism Hall of Fame Travel Show Host	for Kris TV	Won	

==== New York Festival Awards ====
Year	Category	Notes	Result	Ref
2009	SILVER Medal for Best Talk Show	for Boy and Kris	Won	

==== Asia Rainbow TV Awards ====
Year	Category	Notes	Result	Ref
2014	Outstanding Female Program Host	for Kris TV	Won	
