= Pangako Sa 'Yo =

2000–02 Philippine television drama series

- Title card
- Also known as: The Promise
- Genre: Drama; Romance
- Created by: ABS-CBN Studios
- Developed by: ABS-CBN Studios; Star Cinema
- Written by: Tammy Bejerano; Dado Lumibao; Henry King Quitain; Emman Dela Cruz; Ted Boborol
- Directed by: Rory B. Quintos
- Creative director: Olivia M. Lamasan
- Starring: Kristine Hermosa; Jericho Rosales; Eula Valdez; Jean Garcia; Tonton Gutierrez
- Theme music composer: Rey Valera
- Opening theme: "Pangako" by Vina Morales
- Country of origin: Philippines
- Original language: Filipino
- No. of episodes: 480

Production
- Executive producer: Ellen Nicholas Criste
- Running time: 15-30 minutes (original); 44–47 minutes (international)
- Production company: Star Creatives

Original release
- Network: ABS-CBN
- Release: November 13, 2000 – September 20, 2002

Related
- Pangako sa 'Yo (2015–2016)

Pangako Sa 'Yo (transl. promise to you, international title: The Promise) is a Philippine television drama romance series broadcast by ABS-CBN. It stars Jericho Rosales and Kristine Hermosa. It aired on the network's evening line up from November 13, 2000 to September 20, 2002, replacing Labs Ko Si Babe and was replaced by Bituin.

The series is streaming online on iWant and on YouTube via Jeepney TV.

The soap opera centers on themes of wealth, politics, business socio economic climate, and the love between the rich and the poor.

== Plot ==
The story begins with the romance between Amor de Jesús (Valdez) and Eduardo Buenavista (Gutierrez). Eduardo's mother, Doña Benita (Lorena), opposes the relationship because Amor is a housemaid and she wants Eduardo to marry Claudia Zalameda (Garcia) for political reasons. Doña Benita enlists Eduardo's older brother, Diego (Alarcon), who is also attracted to Amor, to separate them. Eduardo mistakenly believes Diego and Amor are involved when he sees Diego trying to sexually abuse her, leading him to marry Claudia. Pregnant and banished from the Buenavista hacienda, Amor returns to her mother in Manila, living at the Payatas dumpsite. She vows revenge on the Buenavista family upon learning of Eduardo's marriage to Claudia.

After giving birth to her daughter, María Amor (Hermosa), Amor and her friend Lourdes (Austria-Ventura) survive by working in clubs. Amor catches the eye of a rich American, James Powers (Cooper), who brings her to the United States. She leaves María Amor and her mother, Chayong (Bautista), at the dumpsite, sending money to them periodically. James proves abusive, preventing Amor from returning home when a landslide hits the dumpsite. Believing her mother and daughter have died and retaliating for his abuses, Amor does not seek medical help when James had a stroke. He dies, and Amor inherits his fortune.

Eduardo and Claudia have two children: Angelo (Rosales) and Lia (Sta. Maria). Eduardo serves as the governor of Punta Verde, while Claudia becomes the elusive queen of illegal gambling in the province. Angelo, a rebel, dislikes his father, whereas Lia is a sweet, devout Catholic teenager who cares deeply for her loved ones.

Amor's daughter survives the landslide and is adopted by Isko (Daluz) and Belen Macaspac (Darren). They find drawings Eduardo made for Amor, signed “Ynamorata,” near the abandoned child and name her Ynamorata, later shortened to “Yna.” Isko and Belen have their own children: Caloy, who hates Yna, and teenager Flerida (Mendoza).

Doña Benita regrets forcing Eduardo to marry Claudia, who turned out to be cruel. On her deathbed, she tries to confess to breaking Eduardo and Amor's relationship but dies before doing so. To atone for her sins, Doña Benita's spirit haunts the dreams of the grown Yna.

Twenty years later, Yna and Eduardo accidentally meet. Yna dreams of Doña Benita revealing that her past is connected to the Buenavista family. Intrigued, she gets a job as a housemaid in Eduardo's household. Yna and Angelo fall in love, much to the dismay of Claudia, who looks down on housemaids and makes Yna's life miserable.

Amor Powers returns to the Philippines after achieving success in the U.S. business world. She plans revenge on the Buenavistas for her past sufferings and the assumed death of her daughter, María Amor. It is initially thought that Yna and Angelo are half-siblings, as Yna's true father is revealed to be Eduardo. However, it turns out Angelo's biological father is not Eduardo nor Simon Barcial (Arcilla), Claudia's former lover, but Eduardo's adopted brother, Diego. Diego fathered Angelo with a poor woman named Thelma, who has since passed away.

It is revealed that Claudia had a daughter with Simon. Claudia's father switched the babies after Doña Benita demanded a male heir, with Angelo being the boy who replaced the girl. The daughter, Clarissa (dela Fuente), was raised by an old woman named Puríng (Linda) as María Amor. Puríng made Clarissa believe she was María Amor de Jesús, Amor's daughter.

Claudia kills María Amor/Clarissa to exact revenge on Amor but is deeply crushed upon learning the girl's true identity. Filled with anger and regret, Claudia, Coring (Aguilar), and her henchmen plan to kill the Buenavista family at Yna and Angelo's wedding. Confronting them with a gun, Claudia is made to realize her importance and the goodness in her heart by Angelo and Lia. She reconciles with everyone at the wedding, including Amor and Angelo, who ask for her forgiveness. Claudia sees Clarissa's spirit at the altar and begs forgiveness. Although forgiven by everyone, Claudia is sentenced to lifelong imprisonment for her past crimes. Later, Amor gives her Clarissa's ashes.

Five years later, the major characters find happiness and reunite with their true loves. Yna becomes pregnant and marries Angelo. Claudia meets her granddaughter from her now-deceased daughter, Lia, and marries Simon while in prison. Amor and Eduardo, after 27 years of enduring love, decide to live happily together and marry.

== Cast and characters ==
=== Main cast ===
- Kristine Hermosa as Ynamorata ”Yna” Macaspac / María Amor de Jesús
- Jericho Rosales as Angelo Buenavista
- Eula Valdez as Amor de Jesús / Amor Powers
- Jean Garcia as Madam Claudia Buenavista
- Tonton Gutierrez as Eduardo Buenavista

=== Supporting cast ===
- Amy Austria-Ventura as Lourdes Magpantay/Ka Adora
- Jestoni Alarcon as Diego Buenavista
- Patrick Garcia as Jonathan Mobido
- Jodi Sta. Maria as Lía Buenavista
- Vanessa del Bianco as Bea Bianca Bejerrano / Electrika Powers
- Carlo Muñoz as Mark Delgado
- Dianne dela Fuente as María Amor / Clarissa Barcial
- Eva Darren as Belén Macaspac
- Cris Daluz as Francisco "Isko" Macaspac
- Hazel Ann Mendoza as Flerida Macaspac
- Evangeline Pascual as Betty Mae Verseles
- Minnie Aguilar as Coring
- Michelle Bayle as Felicity Banks
- Dennis Trillo as Ruel Pedro

=== Extended cast ===
- John Arcilla as Simón Barcial
- Ilonah Jean as Cherri Barcial
- Nikka Valencia as Julieta Macaspac
- Jay Manalo as Caloy Macaspac
- Luis Alandy as David San Luis
- Liza Lorena as Doña Benita Buenavista
- Ricky Davao as Tony Banks
- Ernie Zarate as Mayor Enrique Zalameda
- Flora Gasser as Yaya Pacita
- Mosang as Doray
- Ian Galliguez as Chinee
- Gigette Reyes as Debra
- Sean Glenn Ignacio as Serafin
- Suzette Ranillo as Fatima Dela Merced
- Bing Davao as Lorenzo Dela Merced
- Sally Baderes as Nimfa Macaspac
- Rey Kilay as Cookie
- Perla Bautista as Chayong de Jesús
- Eliza Pineda as Young Amor de Jesús
- Rene Pangilinan as Rene
- Kristine Garcia as Elizabeth
- Anita Linda as Purificacion
- Ronnie Quizon as Badeo
- Ramon Christopher as Cris
- Jeffrey Hidalgo as Kenneth
- Gerard Pizzaras as Rey
- Mark Bryan Homecillo as Itoy
- Josie Tagle as Mrs. Chua
- Roy Rodrigo as Miguel
- Carlo Maceda as Cholo
- Ruby Rosa as Guada
- Mike Lloren as Albert
- Lucita Soriano as Lola Gaying
- Paolo Contis as Vinnie
- Tado as Jason
- Alfred Vargas as Dyno Zuryete
- Phoemela Baranda as Queenie Bermudez
- Berting Labra as Pepe
- Richard Quan as Benjie Gatmaitan
- Gammy Viray as Atty. Madrigal
- Rey Sagum as Inmate
- Ernie David as Inmate
- Crispin Pineda
- Connie Chua
- Tom Olivar
- Rusty Sanggalang
- Abet Zialcita
- Gino Paul Guzman
- Joed Serrano
- Cj Tolentino
- Froilan Sales as Rufo
- Jon Achaval as Eddie
- Corrine Mendez as Shiela
- Ermie Concepcion as Tiya Meling
- Shermaine Santiago as Jackie
- Dido dela Paz as Ka Ramon
- Vic Vargas
- Mico Palanca as Jaypee
- Cris Michelena
- Raquel Villavicencio as Dra. Castillo
- Susan Corpuz
- Jenny Miller
- Wilson Go as Mr. Chua
- Eva Ramos as Selya
- Mon Confiado as Turing
- Roderick Lindayag as Dolfo
- Toffee Calma as Atty. Eman Capistrano/Arman
- Chinggoy Alonzo as General
- Gem Ramos as Lia's friend
- Ina Raymundo as Eidelweiss Guttenberg
- Denise Laurel as Chammy Guttenberg
- Ronalisa Cheng
- Melissa Mendez as Minerva Capito
- Jiro Manio as Cocoy Dela Merced
- Marc Acueza as Kit
- Juan Rodrigo as Father Crispin
- Onemig Bondoc as Errol Garcia
- Julius Babao as himself (host, Talk TV)
- Christine Bersola-Babao as herself (host, Talk TV)
- Ryan Agoncillo as himself (host, Talk TV)
- Janette McBride as herself (host, Talk TV)

== Production ==
In June 2002, the Filipino Society of Composers, Authors and Publishers (FILSCAP) accused ABS-CBN of copyright infringement due to alleged unpaid royalties for its songs, with the Regional Trial Court 90 of Quezon City issuing a temporary restraining order towards ABS-CBN that prevented them from using "Pangako sa 'Yo" and other FILSCAP-owned songs in their programs for 20 days.

== Reception ==
The soap, which ran from November 13, 2000, to September 20, 2002, spanned 481 episodes at 30 minutes each then replaced by Bituin. The show posted an all-time high rating of 64.9% during its September 2002 series finale. This is the second highest rating for any Filipino-made TV series, behind one of the airings of Esperanza on ABS-CBN in 1997, and is the all-time highest rating for any TV series finale in the Philippines.

=== Accolades ===
- Asian Television Awards 2001: Runner Up - Best Drama Series
- Asian Television Awards 2001: Highly Commended - Best Direction (Long Form)
- 15th PMPC Star Awards for Television: Best TV Series
- 15th PMPC Star Awards for Television: Best Actress - Eula Valdez
- 16th PMPC Star Awards for Television: Best Actress - Jean Garcia

== International broadcast ==
Pangako sa 'Yo was the first Filipino television program to air in Kenya on the national broadcaster KBC. Its immense popularity in Kenya resulted in its second run years later on Citizen TV and paved the way for the many teleserye that have been broadcast in Kenya for over two decades. It aired in Tanzania on national broadcaster TBC formerly known as TVT and gained National popularity that’s switched from the usual Latin American soap operas. In Malaysia, through a local satellite TV channel, Astro Bella, starting November 22, will air Pangako sa 'Yo because of high demand. It airs in Tagalog with Bahasa Melayu subtitles. Airs Monday to Friday at 11:00am with encore on the same day and also on weekends with marathon. In Singapore through local satellite TV Channel from Malaysia, Astro Prima on mio TV Channel 602 starting April 10, 2013, will air Pangako sa 'Yo because of high demand in Singapore due to this series was first shown on Suria in 2007. It airs in Tagalog with Bahasa Melayu subtitles. Airs Monday to Friday from 5:30 PM to 6:30 PM with an encore on the same day at 10:00 AM and also on 12 midnight on the same day.

== Cambodian adaptation ==
Cambodia's The Promise (2013) title card.

Pangako sa 'Yo was adapted in Cambodia when Cambodian Television Network (CTN) acquired rights from ABS-CBN Corporation. Entitled The Promise (Khmer:សន្យាស្នេហ៍), the Cambodian version was produced by Khmer Mekong Films (KMF) and aired in Cambodia from 2013 to 2014 with 198 episodes. It was adapted to suit the Cambodian cultural context and audience sensitivities.

The Promise was broadcast peak-time on CTN, Cambodia's most popular TV channel, running three shows a week until July 2014.

== Remake ==
The first remake of Pangako sa 'Yo debuted on May 25, 2015. It stars Jodi Sta. Maria, Ian Veneracion, Angelica Panganiban, Kathryn Bernardo and Daniel Padilla. Rory Quintos, who directed the original series, also directed the remake. The remake was produced by Star Creatives. It ended on February 12, 2016, with a total of 190 episodes.

Jodi Sta. Maria, who played Lia Buenavista in the original, was cast as Amor Powers in the 2015 remake. Two other cast members from the original version were also part of the 2015 remake - Amy Austria (who played Lourdes Magbanua in the original series) was cast as Belen Macaspac; and Richard Quan (who played Benjie Gatmaitan, the investigative reporter, in the original series) was cast as Theodore Boborol, Eduardo Buenavista's political rival.

== See also ==
- List of programs broadcast by ABS-CBN
- List of ABS-CBN drama series
