= List of PMPC Star Awards for TV's Multi-Award Winning Performers & Personalities =

All the winning performers & personalities from PMPC Star Awards for Television have more than two categories.

- Luis Manzano (5): "Best Male New TV Personality", "Best Male Showbiz-Oriented Show Host", "Best Talent Search Program Host", "Best Game Show Host" and "Best Male TV Host".
- Boy Abunda (4): "Best Male Showbiz-Oriented Show Host" (Hall of Famer), "Best Celebrity Talk Show Host" (shared), "Best Public Affairs Program Host" and "Best Magazine Show Host".
- Kris Aquino (4): "Best Female Showbiz-Oriented Show Host", "Best Celebrity Talk Show Host" (shared), "Best Game Show Host" and "Best Lifestyle Program Host
- Toni Gonzaga (4): "Best Female Showbiz-Oriented Show Host", "Best Reality Show Host" (shared), "Best Talent Search Program Host" (shared) and "Best Female TV Host".
- Judy Ann Santos (4): "Best Drama Actress", "Best Reality Show Host", "Best Game Show Host", and "Best Single Performance by an Actress".
- Kim Chiu (5) "Best Female New TV Personality", "Best Drama Actress", Best Single Performance by An Actress" and "Best Talent Search Program Host" (shared), "Best Female TV Host".
- Nora Aunor (3):"Best Female TV Host","Best Drama Actress" and Best Single Performance by an Actress ".
- Vic Sotto (3): "Best Male TV Host", "Best Comedy Actor" and "Best Game Show Host".
- Korina Sanchez (3): "Best Female Newscaster", "Best Celebrity Talk Show Host" (shared) and "Best Magazine Show Host".
- Arjo Atayde (3): "Best Male New TV Personality", "Best Single Performance by an Actor" and "Best Drama Supporting Actor".
- Claudine Barretto (3): "Best New TV Personality", "Best Female TV Host" and "Best Single Performance by an Actress".
- Marian Rivera (3): "Best Female New TV Personality", "Best Drama Actress" and "Best Female TV Host".
- Julius Babao (3): "Best Male Newscaster", "Best Morning Show Host" (shared) and "Best Public Service Program Host".
- Ai-Ai delas Alas (3): "Best Comedy Actress", "Best Game Show Host" (shared) and "Best Single Performance by an Actress".
- Robi Domingo (3): "Best Male New TV Personality", "Best Talent Search Program Host" (shared) and "Best Reality Show Host" (shared).
- Willie Revillame (3): "Best Public Service Program Host", "Best Male TV Host" and "Best Game Show Host".
- Sylvia Sanchez (3): "Best Single Performance by an Actress ", "Best Drama Actress"and "Best Drama Supporting Actress".
