= Whitney Tyson =

Filipino-American actress, singer, and comedian

- Born: Bunny Fowler; Angeles City, Pampanga, Philippines
- Years active: 1987–2022; 2024–present

Whitney Tyson (born Bunny Fowler) is a Filipino-American actress, singer and comedian, best known for her role as Elizabeth in FPJ's Ang Probinsyano.

== Personal life ==
Tyson was born Bunny Fowler in Angeles, Pampanga, the only child of an African-American father and a Filipino mother.

== Career ==
Tyson's stage name is a portmanteau of the late singer Whitney Houston and the former heavyweight boxer Mike Tyson. Despite initially facing racism for her African-American heritage, Tyson embraced her ethnicity and used it as an asset in entering show business. She usually played supporting roles as sidekicks or household helpers in various films and television series. Her career eventually declined over the years, to the point of making appearances in various fiestas to make ends meet as a destitute living in a shanty under Nagtahan Bridge in Manila. Tyson later relocated to a resettlement area in Bulacan along with her mother.

Following an interview with Korina Sanchez on the weekly magazine show Rated K, Tyson made a comeback in FPJ's Ang Probinsyano aired on ABS-CBN, Kapamilya Channel, A2Z, and TV5 with a supporting role as Elizabeth, a maid working at the Presidential Palace.

== Filmography ==
=== Film ===
Year	Title	Role	Source
1988	One Two Bato, Three Four Bapor		
1997	Yes Darling: Walang Matigas Na Pulis 2		
1997	Bobby Barbers: Parak The Bobby Barbers Story		
1998	Haba-Baba-Doo! Puti-Puti-Poo!	Claudine	
1999	Tar-San	Sangsang	
2003	A.B. Normal College	Monang	
2004	Otso-Otso Pamela-Mela-Wan	Ita	
2009	Astig	Babae ni Ariel	
2012	Mondomanila	Lovely Paybsiks	
2015	Espesyal Kopol		
2018	Jack Em Popoy: The Puliscredibles	Angelo's yaya	
2019	3pol Trobol: Huli Ka Balbon!	Sharon	

=== Television ===
Year	Title	Role	Source
1987–1991	Still Goin' Bananas		
1992–1997	Mara Clara	Querubin	
1994–1995	Tropang Trumpo	Herself / Various roles	
1998–2001	Richard Loves Lucy	Tyra	
2007	Margarita	Fiona Santillan	
2007	Super Inggo 1.5: Ang Bagong Bangis	Inday 2.0 (Super Inday's alter ego)	
2014	Tunay na Buhay	Herself	
2018–2022	FPJ's Ang Probinsyano	Elizabeth	
2023	Magandang ARAw	Herself	
2024	Padyak Princess	Aling Betchay	
2024	Pamilya Sagrado	Manang Lupe	
2024	FPJ's Batang Quiapo	Wilma	

== Awards and nominations ==
Year	Work	Award	Category	Result	Source
1988	Still Goin' Bananas	PMPC Star Awards for Television	Most Promising TV Personality	Won	
