= Janette McBride =

Filipino-Australian actress and host (born 1983)

- Born: Janette Heather McBride (Note: Janette McBride was born in Australia. Thus, she does not possess her mother's maiden name.); 6 November 1983 (age 42); Queensland, Australia
- Other name: Janet McBride
- Occupation: Actress
- Years active: 1996–2007

Janette Heather McBride, known professionally as Janet McBride (born 6 November 1983 in Queensland, Australia), is an Australian former actress and television host.

== Early life ==
Born in Queensland, Australia, Janette Heather McBride is the daughter of Leslie and Fe McBride. Her parents were penpals, her mother is from Borongan, Samar and her father is from Queensland, and is of Scottish-Irish descent. She has one younger brother and four half-siblings from her mother's previous marriage.

== Career ==
McBride was part of ABS-CBN's Star Circle Batch 8 and appeared in Richard Loves Lucy, Kaybol: Ang Bagong TV and ASAP.

Her breakthrough performance in Philippine cinema came in 2000 when she was cast in Laurice Guillen's award-winning and critically acclaimed film Tanging Yaman which won her a New Movie Actress of the Year award in the PMPC Star Awards in 2001. The same year, she starred in Star Drama Theater Presents: Rave with Marvin Agustin, with whom she previously worked in the film Tanging Yaman.

McBride was one of the hosts of ABS-CBN's Talk TV, which replaced Today with Kris Aquino in 2001.

In 2006, McBride returned to the Philippines and appeared in Makita Ka Lang Muli.

== Personal life ==
McBride was in an eight-year on and off relationship with Mo Twister. McBride's then blossoming entertainment career was cut short when the couple moved to the United States in the early 2000s, where McBride worked at odd jobs as a call center agent, a photographer and in customer care.

In September 2013, McBride married Bens Omaga, who she met in a church retreat in 2011.

McBride is close friends with her Talk TV co-hosts Julius Babao, Christine Bersola-Babao and Ryan Agoncillo. Babao was a wedding sponsor at McBride's wedding while McBride was part of the wedding entourage of the Babaos' wedding in 2003.

McBride is a member of the Victory Christian Fellowship.

== Filmography ==
=== Television ===
Year	Title	Role	Notes	Source
1996–2002	ASAP	Herself / Host		
1997	Kaybol: Ang Bagong TV	Herself		
1998–2001	Richard Loves Lucy			
2000	Star Drama Theater Presents: Rave			
2000	Labs Ko Si Babe	Miguel's ex-girlfriend		
1999–2000	Tabing Ilog	Fair		
1999–2002	!Oka Tokat	Andrea "Andie" Santiago	When G. Toengi moved to GMA; McBride's character took over Toengi's spot until early 2002	
2001–2002	Talk TV	Herself / Host		
2006–2007	Makita Ka Lang Muli	Cali		

=== Film ===
Year	Title	Role	Notes	Source
2000	Tanging Yaman	Madeleine		
2001	Taxi ni Pilo		Credited as "Janet McBride"	
2002	Burlesk King Daw, O!'	Nancy		

== Awards and nominations ==
Year	Work	Award	Category	Result	Source
2001	Tanging Yaman	Young Critics Circle Award	Best Performance by Male or Female, Adult or Child, Individual or Ensemble in Leading or Supporting Role	Won	
2001	Tanging Yaman	Gawad Urian Awards	Gawad Urian Award for Best Supporting Actress	Nominated	
2001	Tanging Yaman	PMPC Star Awards for Movies	New Movie Actress of the Year	Won	
