= Teysi ng Tahanan =

Philippine defunct television talk show

- Genre: Talk show Docudrama
- Created by: ABS-CBN Corporation
- Directed by: Zaldy Bonalos; Romy Veron; Arnel Jacobe
- Presented by: Tessie Tomas
- Opening theme: "Teysi ng Tahanan" theme song
- Country of origin: Philippines
- Original language: Filipino

Production
- Executive producers: Roldeo T. Endrinal; Mickey Muñoz; Gigi Banaag-Santos; Wenn Deramas; Joel Siervo
- Production locations: Studio 5, ABS-CBN Broadcasting Center, Quezon City, Philippines
- Running time: 60 minutes

Original release
- Network: ABS-CBN
- Release: February 18, 1991 – March 26, 1997

Related
- Magandang Umaga Po; Today with Kris Aquino

Teysi ng Tahanan (lit. 'Teysi of the home') is a Philippine television talk show broadcast by ABS-CBN. Hosted by Tessie Tomas, it aired from February 18, 1991 to March 26, 1997, replacing Magandang Umaga Po and was replaced by Today with Kris Aquino.

The show was the first morning program to also be shown internationally before the use of international programming the program aired internationally via The Filipino Channel from 1994 to 1997 and its revived successor in 2003.

== Overview ==
Each day of the show had a theme: Mondays focused on the occult with psychic Madame Rosa in Iparamdam kay Madam. Tuesdays and Thursdays tackled love and sex issues with therapist Dr. Margie Holmes. Wednesdays covered crime and current events, while Fridays featured dramatizations of viewers’ life stories in Kung Maibabalik Ko Lang, inspired by Regine Velasquez-Alcasid's 1987 song.

The show became an instant hit, winning numerous local awards and earning "Hall of Fame" recognition from prestigious organizations like Gawad CCP, Catholic Mass Media, KBP Golden Dove, and Star Awards in the Best Talk Show or Best Women's Show categories. It achieved unprecedented ratings and became a top revenue generator for ABS-CBN, with advertisers eager to sponsor the program.

The cooking segment, Eagle's Nest, was regularly sponsored by major food companies such as California Manufacturing Company (CMC) Philippines—now Best Foods, a subsidiary of Unilever Philippines, Nestlé, or other food industry giants. Other notable segments included Ginang Give Away, Super-Misis, My Pretty Baby, Ganda Babae, Buking!, Tapatan Kay Kapitan, International Dial-a-Darling, Ipagpatawad Mo, Teysi ng Tahanan Club, Usong-Uso and the SHARP Washing Machine Portion backed by SHARP Philippines.

The program served as a training ground for emerging talents, both on and off-camera. It catapulted personalities like Eagle Riggs, Madame Rosa, and Dr. Holmes to household-name status. Notable figures such as Arnell Ignacio, Giselle Sanchez, Dang Cruz, and Mosang got their first taste of television exposure through the show.

Behind the scenes, the program nurtured some of the most influential creatives in Philippine television. Deo Endrinal went on to become the driving force behind ABS-CBN's biggest drama series, while Enrico Santos became a creative visionary at Star Cinema. The show also produced some of the industry's finest writers, executives, and directors. Directors who began as part of the show's staff include Wenn V. Deramas, Don Cuaresma, Erick Salud, Connie Macatuno, and Arnel Jacobe.

Tomas' wedding to her British husband, Roger Pullin, was broadcast live on the show in 1994.

Teysi ng Tahanan remained a leader in its format and timeslot until it ended in 1997. The show concluded after six successful years when host Tessie Tomas decided to step back and focus on spending more time with her husband. It was then replaced by Today with Kris Aquino.

In 1998, Tomas was focusing on the weekly short-lived miniseries Sa Sandaling Kailangan Mo Ako that airs every Monday, where she played Sonia Enriquez.

== Spin-off ==
In line with the 50th anniversary of Philippine television, Teysi ng Tahanan launched a spin-off talk show entitled Teysi, which premiered on February 3, 2003 before Morning Girls (later Morning Girls with Kris and Korina) then moved to its new timeslot at 08:00am until it ended in March 2004 that lasted for a year when Magandang Umaga, Bayan extended its timeslot until 8:30am. The theme song of the show was revived upon the returning of the host almost 6 years after it ended.

The talk show is currently available online on Jeepney TV's YouTube Channel.

Teysi
- Title Card
- Genre: Entertainment; Talk show
- Based on: Teysi ng Tahanana
- Written by: Joel Mercado; Cathy Cruz; Darla Sauler; Alice Sanchez; Mariecriss Adaya; Zaldy Gumaru
- Directed by: Arnel Natividad
- Presented by: Tessie Tomas
- Country of origin: Philippines
- No. of episodes: 55

Production
- Executive producer: Ethel Espiritu
- Producers: Yvette Raniezes; Mercee Tolentino
- Editors: May Gonzales; Sonny de Jesus; Rommel Malimban
- Running time: 15-49 minutes

Original release
- Network: ABS-CBN
- Release: February 3, 2003 – March 2004

== Hosts ==
=== Main host ===
- Tessie Tomas

=== Guest hosts ===
- Kris Aquino (Substitute host for Tomas)
- Gel Santos-Relos (Substitute host for Tomas)

=== Segment presenters ===
- Jun Encarnacion
- Eagle Riggs
- Madame Rosa
- Dang Cruz
- Mosang
- Dr. Margie Holmes

== Awards and recognitions ==
- Winner, Best Woman Show - PMPC Star Awards for TV (1992-1996)
- Winner, Best Woman Show Host - PMPC Star Awards for TV (1992-1996)

== See also ==
- List of programs broadcast by ABS-CBN
- Katok Mga Misis
