= Talk TV =

Talk TV may refer to:

- MTV (Canadian TV channel), a lifestyle and entertainment channel in Canada previously known as Talk TV
- Talk TV (Philippine TV network), a defunct all-news channel in the Philippines (2011 to 2012)
- Talk TV (Philippine TV series), a defunct talk show which premiered on ABS-CBN, in the Philippines from 2001 to 2002
- Talk (streaming service), previously TalkTV, a British opinion-orientated channel owned by News Corp., launched in 2022
- Granada Talk TV, a short-lived British daytime channel broadcast by Granada Sky Broadcasting from 1996 until 1997
