= GCIC =

GCIC may refer to:

- Global City Innovative College a private college in Taguig City, Philippines.
- Global Cyberspace Integration Center a field operating agency of the United States Air Force.
