= Trip ni Kris =

- Genre: Magazine, Lifestyle, Travel
- Created by: APT Entertainment
- Developed by: APT Entertainment
- Presented by: Kris Aquino
- Country of origin: Philippines

Production
- Running time: 1 hour

Original release
- Network: GMA Network
- Release: April 9, 2017

Trip ni Kris (lit. Kris' Trip) was a travel-themed, lifestyle television special in the Philippines produced by APT Entertainment and broadcast by GMA Network. It is hosted by the "Queen of All Media" Kris Aquino.

The show marks Kris' first TV comeback after almost a year of hiatus upon leaving ABS-CBN.

== Host ==
- Kris Aquino
