= Kris TV =

Philippine defunct television talk show of ABS-CBN

- Kris TV logo
- Genre: Talk show Magazine; Lifestyle; Cooking show
- Developed by: ABS-CBN Corporation
- Written by: Kris Aquino; Darla Sauler; Airene Aicah Sopeña; Gian Carlo Isidro
- Directed by: Richie Garcia; Pinggoy Generoso; Erick Salud
- Presented by: Kris Aquino
- Theme music composer: Annabelle Regalado-Borja
- Opening theme: "Kris TV" by Angeline Quinto "Kris & Bimby Summer TV" by Darren Espanto
- Country of origin: Philippines
- Original languages: Filipino; English
- No. of seasons: 5
- No. of episodes: 1,258

Production
- Executive producer: Jasmin Pallera
- Producers: Dianne Ifchelle Cruz; Ermie Mambatac; James Cantos; Liza Madrienes; Elaine Marie Garcia; Krissa Donida; Shereen Ghalya; Niño Soriano; Joy Chiong
- Running time: 60 minutes (2011–14); 90 minutes (2014–16)
- Production companies: ABS-CBN Studios; K Productions

Original release
- Network: ABS-CBN
- Release: June 27, 2011 – April 15, 2016

Related
- Today with Kris Aquino; Morning Girls with Kris and Korina; Good Morning, Kris; Boy & Kris; Simply KC; Magandang Buhay

Kris TV is a Philippine television talk show broadcast by ABS-CBN. Hosted by Kris Aquino, it aired on the network's Umaganda line up from June 27, 2011 to April 15, 2016.

The show was later cancelled in 2016 after almost 5 years after Aquino decided to leave ABS-CBN due to health conditions and to spend more time with her family.

== History ==
Kris Aquino stated on her Twitter account that her defunct talk show Today with Kris Aquino will be back on air, but as the days passed, she announced that she will return on a talk show but will be entitled as Kris TV.

Kris TV premiered on June 27, 2011 from 9:30 AM to 10:30 AM on ABS-CBN's Umaganda morning block, right before the talent competition program Showtime (later known as the noontime show It's Showtime.)

On June 4, 2012, Kris TV moved to an earlier timeslot from 8:00 AM to 9:00 AM, right before the Filipino-dubbed Japanese anime shows under the Team Animazing morning animation block.

On February 10, 2014, Kris TV extended its timeslot from 7:30 AM to 9:00 AM, replacing 30 minutes of the morning program Umagang Kay Ganda. In the same year, the show is later reformatted as a lifestyle magazine talk show.

=== Format ===
Kris TV aims to focus on everyday lifestyle and educational places to go that housewives, husbands and kids can relate to. Aquino's talk show varies different topics and segments not only limiting to interviews, but also to everyday life and bonding moments among the audience and the special guests.

The show airs taped Mondays to Fridays.

=== Segments and spin-offs ===
Kris RealiTV

One of the regular spin-offs of Kris TV. The talk show does not only feature on-studio and live programs, they travel around the country.

Kris & Bimby Summer TV

A Kris TV summer spin-off aired in 2015, featuring a mother-and-son bonding with Kris Aquino and Bimby Aquino Yap in their summer adventures, foodtrips and roadtrips. The theme song was performed by Darren Espanto.

Foodtrip

In occasional episodes, Kris Aquino (often accompanied by her friends and guests, her sons, and headwriter Darla) goes to restaurants in and out of the Metro. It shows Filipino authentic dishes, as well as foreign dishes.

== Hosts ==
Main host

- Kris Aquino (2011–16)

Co-hosts

- Darla Sauler (2011–16)
- Bimby Aquino Yap (2011–16)
- Joshua Aquino (2011–16)
- Francis Escudero (2012)
- Carmina Villarroel
- K Brosas
- Karla Estrada
- John Lapus
- Kim Chiu
- Angeline Quinto
- Melai Cantiveros

== Cancellation ==
After four and a half years of broadcast, Kris TV announced its final episode, which aired on March 23, 2016. Kris Aquino stated that she will be leaving ABS-CBN due to health conditions and spending more time with her family. After the final episode, the show continued to air with re-runs of selected episodes entitled The Best of Kris TV. The program was cancelled on April 15, 2016 and was replaced by Magandang Buhay on its vacated timeslot on April 18, 2016.

== See also ==
- List of programs broadcast by ABS-CBN
- Today with Kris Aquino
- Boy & Kris
