= Talk TV (talk show) =

2001–02 Philippine defunct television talk show of ABS-CBN

- Genre: Talk show
- Created by: ABS-CBN Corporation
- Developed by: ABS-CBN
- Presented by: Christine Bersola; Julius Babao; Ryan Agoncillo; Janette McBride
- Opening theme: "Talk TV" by Dianne dela Fuente
- Country of origin: Philippines
- Original language: Filipino
- No. of episodes: 351

Production
- Production locations: Studio, ABS-CBN Broadcasting Center, Quezon City, Philippines
- Camera setup: Multiple-camera setup
- Running time: 30-60 minutes

Original release
- Network: ABS-CBN
- Release: March 12, 2001 – July 19, 2002

Talk TV is a Philippine television talk show broadcast by ABS-CBN. Hosted by Julius Babao, Christine Bersola, Ryan Agoncillo and Janette McBride, it aired from March 12, 2001 to July 19, 2002, replacing Today with Kris Aquino and was replaced by Morning Girls with Kris and Korina. The show served as the replacement of Today with Kris Aquino, after the latter took the seat of Korina Sanchez in the magazine show Balitang K (turned into Balitang Kris).

== History and concept ==
When Kris Aquino took over the hosting role of Korina Sanchez in her magazine show Balitang K (Sanchez was then promoted as Chief Correspondent and became the anchor of TV Patrol, whose seat was vacated by Noli de Castro, who would run in the 2001 Senatorial elections, then became vice president on June 30, 2004, and returned to TV Patrol on November 8, 2010), this lead her talk show Today with Kris Aquino to air its final episode on March 9, 2001. Balitang Kris premiered on March 12, 2001, but a few months later, the show was cancelled due to low ratings.

The network needed a new talk show, to accommodate the vacant slot left by Aquino's talk show. On March 12, 2001, Talk TV premiered at 10:30am, with broadcasters turned newly-wed couple Julius Babao and Christine Bersola, Ryan Agoncillo (who transferred from GMA Network) and television actress Janette McBride, gracing the show as the main hosts.

The show is somewhat similar to its predecessor, it was filmed live in front of a studio audience, introduced segments, and featured television and movie personalities, such as the then-on-screen couple Jericho Rosales and Kristine Hermosa, Gretchen Barretto, Laurice Guillen and Philippines' King of Talk Boy Abunda. It also discussed about insights during the 2001 Senatorial elections and were able to dish out opinions from the live studio audience.

However, ratings plummeted to the show due to rival network GMA's talk show SiS securing the top slot in the ratings game. This led the ABS-CBN management to immediately scrap the show and decided to make a new talk show and format change, even though it was described as an already-established talk show.

Talk TV aired its final episode on July 19, 2002, and was replaced by the new talk show Morning Girls, which brought back talk show queen Kris Aquino after a year, with Pops Fernandez and Zsa Zsa Padilla as co-hosts (but Kris was later replaced by Carmina Villarroel), and after a year later, she returned once more on the same show, now with broadcaster Korina Sanchez (under the new title Morning Girls with Kris and Korina) as co-host.

== Final hosts ==
Final hosts

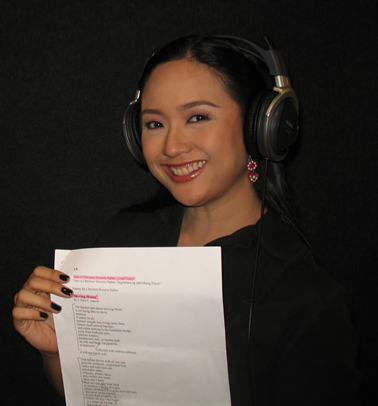
Christine Bersola served as the host.

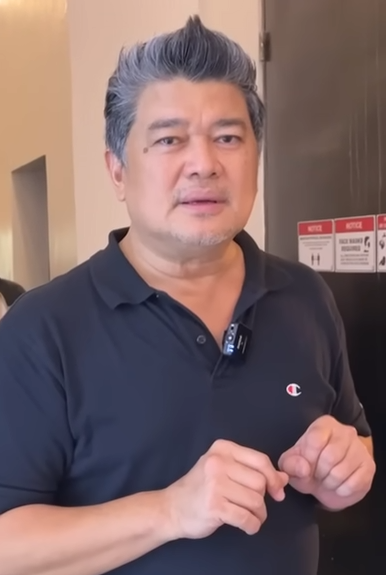
Julius Babao served as the host.

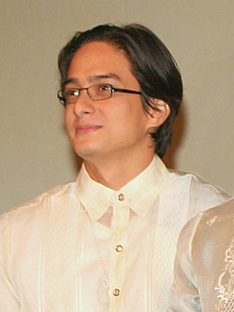
Ryan Agoncillo served as the host.

- Christine Bersola (2001–2002)
- Julius Babao (2001–2002)
- Ryan Agoncillo (2001–2002)

=== Former hosts ===
- Janette McBride (2001)

== See also ==
- List of programs broadcast by ABS-CBN
