= Today with Kris Aquino =

1996–2001 Philippine defunct television talk show of ABS-CBN

- Title card
- Genre: Talk show
- Written by: Kris Aquino; Rondel Lindayag; Jillmer Dy; Michael "Eagle" Riggs
- Directed by: Zaldy Bonalos; Romy Veron
- Creative director: Gil Bien
- Presented by: Kris Aquino
- Theme music composer: Martin Nievera; Louie Ocampo
- Opening theme: "Reach Out and Talk to Me" by Zsa Zsa Padilla
- Country of origin: Philippines
- Original language: Filipino
- No. of episodes: 1,107

Production
- Executive producer: Gia Garchitorena
- Production locations: Studio 5, ABS-CBN Broadcasting Center, Quezon City, Philippines
- Running time: 60 minutes
- Production company: ABS-CBN

Original release
- Network: ABS-CBN
- Release: November 18, 1996 – March 9, 2001

Related
- Talk TV; Morning Girls with Kris and Korina; Good Morning, Kris; Kris TV

Today with Kris Aquino is a Philippine television talk show broadcast by ABS-CBN. Hosted by Kris Aquino, it aired from November 18, 1996 to March 9, 2001, replacing Teysi ng Tahanan and was replaced by Talk TV. It is claimed by some as the Filipino version of The Oprah Winfrey Show. It was where Aquino got her title as the "Philippines' Queen of Talk." The theme song was sung by Zsa Zsa Padilla.

== History ==
Today with Kris Aquino was premiered as an afternoon talk show after Aquino left from GMA Network in 1996. On March 29, 1997, it transferred its timeslot from afternoon (4:00pm) to morning (11:00am), replacing the defunct talk show Teysi ng Tahanan and its reformatted as a morning talk show.

On March 9, 2001, the show ended due to Noli de Castro's decision to run for the senate and leave TV Patrol. Korina Sanchez, who was then hosting Balitang K, was appointed to anchor TV Patrol. With these changes, Aquino was appointed to replace Sanchez, reformatting the show to Balitang Kris. Today with Kris Aquino was replaced by Talk TV.

In May 2011, Aquino announced that the show would be back on air again in June 2011, a decade after it ended. A few days, Aquino said the show would not be revived and instead she would start a talk show with a new title, Kris TV.
