= Makita Ka Lang Muli =

Philippine television drama series

- Title card
- Also known as: Just to See You Again
- Genre: Drama
- Starring: Roderick Paulate; Oyo Boy Sotto; Carlo Aquino
- Theme music composer: Alvina Eileen Sy
- Opening theme: "Nasasaktan" by Reuben Laurente
- Country of origin: Philippines
- Original language: Tagalog
- No. of episodes: 75

Production
- Executive producers: Antonio P. Tuviera; Malou Choa-Fagar
- Producer: Antonio P. Tuviera
- Camera setup: Multiple-camera setup
- Running time: 30 minutes
- Production company: TAPE Inc.

Original release
- Network: GMA Network
- Release: November 6, 2006 – February 16, 2007

Makita Ka Lang Muli (trans. / international title: Just to See You Again) is a Philippine television drama series broadcast by GMA Network. It stars Roderick Paulate, Oyo Boy Sotto and Carlo Aquino. It premiered on November 6, 2006 on the network's Dramarama sa Hapon line up. The series concluded on February 16, 2007, with a total of 75 episodes.

== Cast and characters ==
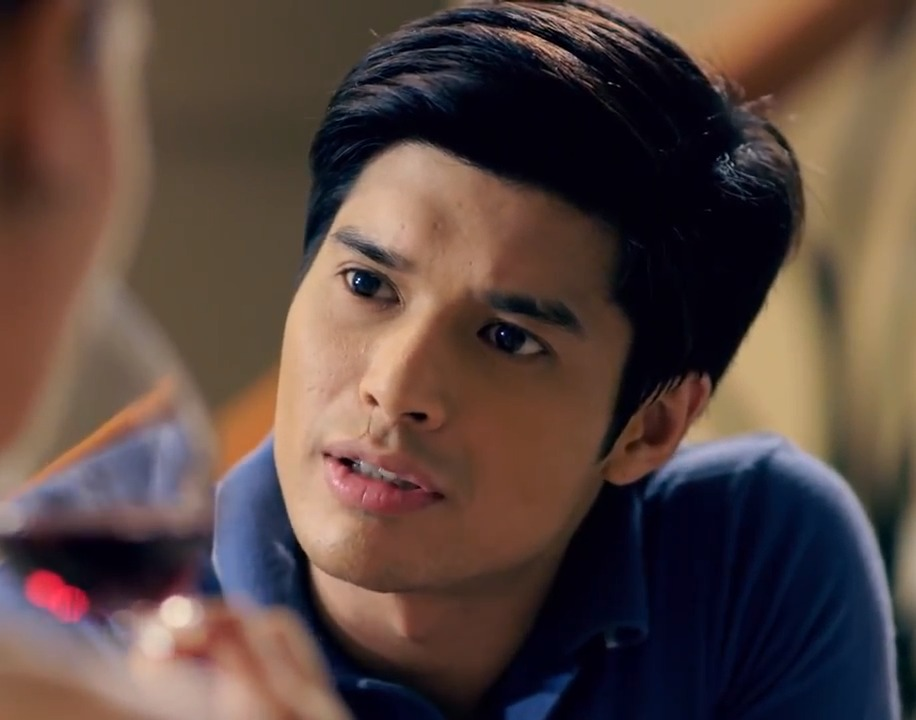
JC de Vera portrays Matthew.

Lead cast

- Roderick Paulate as Valetin Barba / Vicar Barbarosa
- Oyo Boy Sotto as Roy
- Carlo Aquino as Leo

Supporting cast

- Celia Rodriguez as Olmypia Van Helden
- LJ Reyes as Vianne
- JC de Vera as Matthew
- Ana Roces
- Andrea del Rosario as Sofia
- Jaclyn Jose
- Cris Villanueva
- Sugar Mercado as Andeng
- Janette McBride as Cali
- Dion Ignacio
- Tanya Garcia as younger Olmypia

== Accolades ==
Accolades received by Makita Ka Lang Muli
Year	Award	Category	Recipient	Result	Ref.
2007	21st PMPC Star Awards for Television	Best Daytime Drama Series	Makita Ka Lang Muli	Nominated	
2007	21st PMPC Star Awards for Television	Best Drama Actor	Roderick Paulate	Nominated	
