= Larawan: A Special Drama Engagement =

Philippine television drama series

- Genre: Drama
- Created by: Jun Lana
- Directed by: Maryo J. de los Reyes; Joel Lamangan; Mac Alejandre; Ruel S. Bayani; Mark Reyes; Gina Alajar; Dominic Zapata; Eric Quizon; Jeffrey Jeturian; Cesar Montano
- Country of origin: Philippines
- Original language: Tagalog
- No. of episodes: 55

Production
- Executive producer: Lilybeth G. Rasonable
- Camera setup: Multiple-camera setup
- Running time: 60 minutes
- Production company: GMA Entertainment TV

Original release
- Network: GMA Network
- Release: February 14 – December 26, 2001

Larawan: A Special Drama Engagement (transl. photograph: a special drama engagement) is a 2001 Philippine television drama anthology series broadcast by GMA Network. The show features different a lead star every month. It premiered on February 14, 2001. The series concluded on December 26, 2001, with a total of 55 episodes.

== Cast ==
Cast

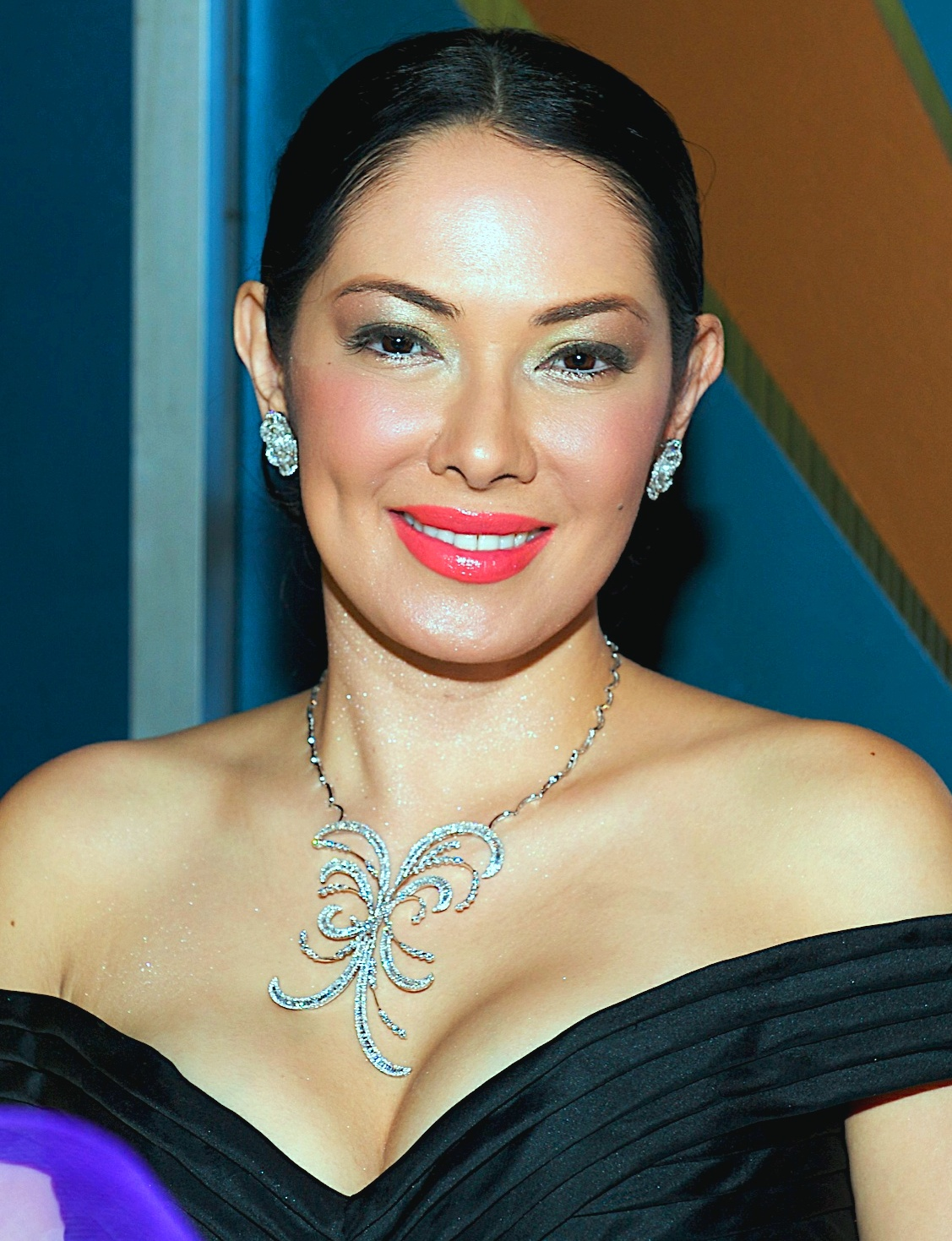
Ruffa Gutierrez

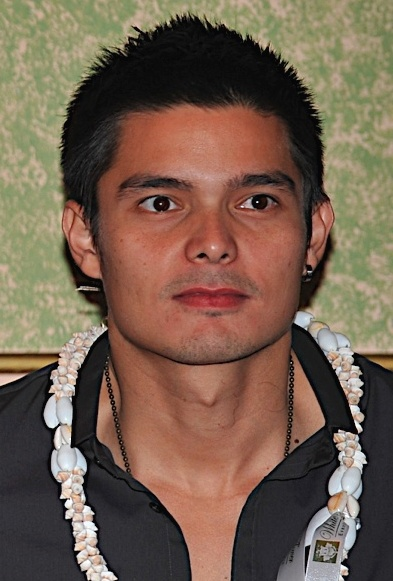
Dingdong Dantes

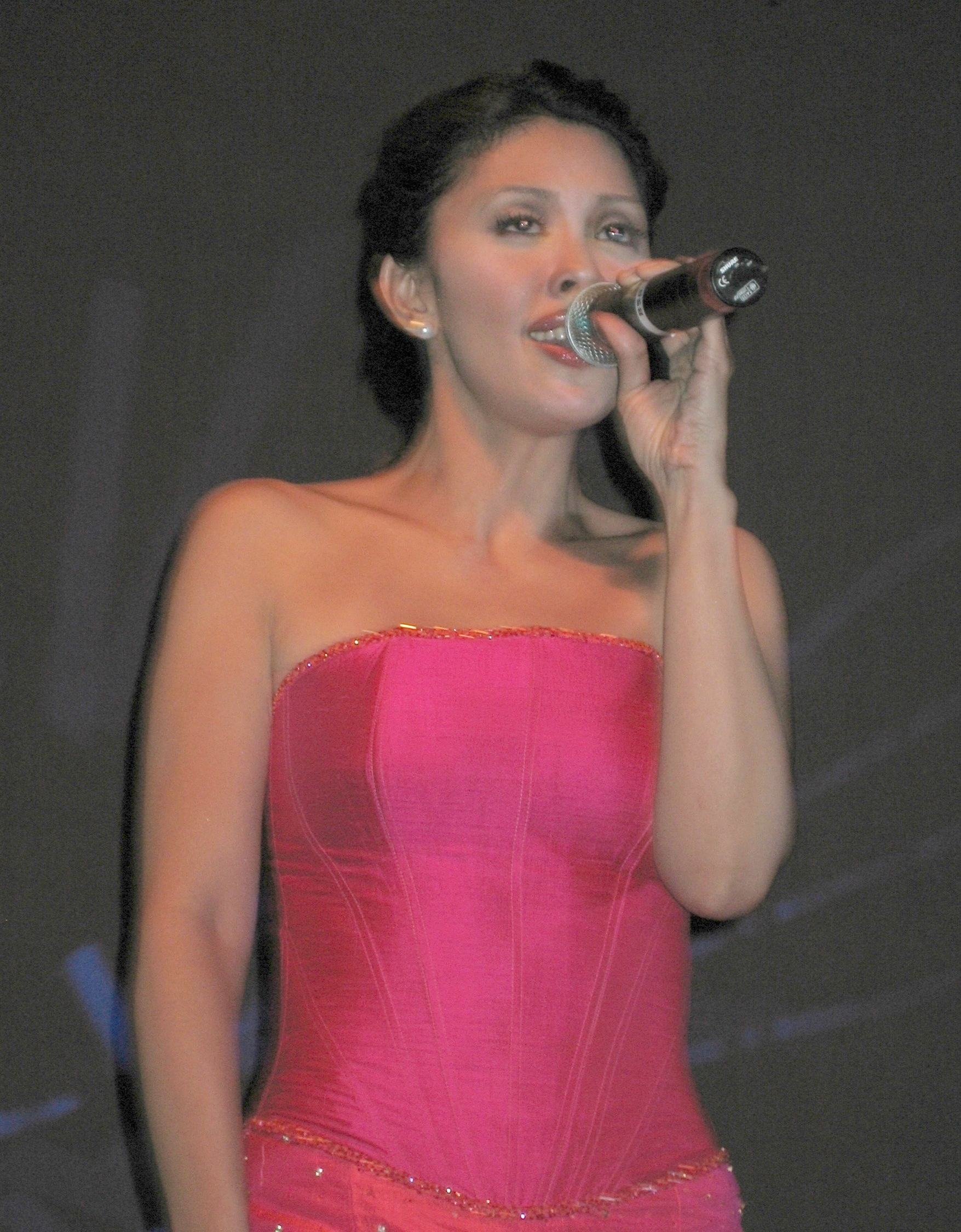
Pops Fernandez

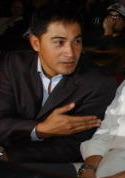
Cesar Montano

- G. Toengi (February 14, 2001 - March 7, 2001)
- Ruffa Gutierrez (March 14, 2001 - April 4, 2001)
- Rufa Mae Quinto (April 11, 2001 - May 2, 2001)
- Donita Rose (May 9, 2001 - May 30, 2001)
- Assunta de Rossi (June 6, 2001 - June 27, 2001)
- Dingdong Dantes (July 4, 2001 - July 25, 2001)
- Pops Fernandez (August 1, 2001 - August 29, 2001)
- Antoinette Taus (September 5, 2001 - September 26, 2001)
- Cesar Montano (October 3, 2001 - October 31, 2001)
- Angelu de Leon (November 7, 2001 - November 28, 2001)
- Albert Martinez (December 5, 2001 - December 26, 2001)

== Accolades ==
Accolades received by Larawan: A Special Drama Engagement
Year	Award	Category	Recipient	Result	Ref.
2002	Asian Television Award	Best Actress	Assunta de Rossi ("Elene Madlang-awa")	Won	
