= Instant Mommy =

2013 Filipino drama-comedy film

- Directed by: Leo Abaya
- Screenplay by: Leo Abaya
- Produced by: Joji Alonso; Kris Aquino; Chris Martinez; John Victor Tence; Leo Abaya; Nilo Divina; Angel Garces-Antonio
- Starring: Eugene Domingo; Yuki Matsuzaki
- Production companies: Cinemalaya; Quantum Films; Kris Aquino Productions
- Distributed by: GMA Pictures
- Release dates: July 27, 2013 (Cinemalaya); August 28, 2013 (Philippines)
- Running time: 102 minutes
- Country: Philippines
- Languages: Filipino; Tagalog; English; Japanese
- Box office: Php 995,113.22

Instant Mommy is a 2013 Filipino drama-comedy film written and directed by Leo Abaya. The film stars Eugene Domingo as Bechayda, a woman who pretends to be pregnant just to keep her Japanese fiancé, played by Yuki Matsuzaki. The film competed in the New Breed section of Cinemalaya 2013. The title is a play on instant mami noodles. The movie was distributed by GMA Pictures.

== Cast ==
- Eugene Domingo as Bechayda
- Nicco Manalo as Olops
- Yuki Matsuzaki as Kaoru
- Luis Alandy as JB
- Rico J. Puno as Ben
- Shamaine Buencamino as Mrs. Cruz
- Tuesday Vargas as Cousin Suzette
- Matt Evans as Oscar
- Jojit Lorenzo as Lee
- Delphine Buencamino as Jenny
- Earl Ignacio as Roger
- Mitoy Sta. Ana as Sir Mitoy
- Dudz Teraña as Win

== Awards ==
- 2013 Cinemalaya Film Festival (New Breed)
  - Nominated–Best Film
