= Balitang K =

1996–2001 Philippine defunct television news magazine show of ABS-CBN

- Genre: News magazine
- Directed by: Bill Velasco; Zaldy Bonalos
- Presented by: Korina Sanchez
- Country of origin: Philippines
- Original language: Filipino

Production
- Running time: 30 minutes
- Production company: ABS-CBN News and Current Affairs

Original release
- Network: ABS-CBN
- Release: July 8, 1996 – March 9, 2001

Related
- Rated K/Rated Korina

Balitang K was a Philippine television news and current affairs magazine show, hosted by Korina Sanchez and broadcast by ABS-CBN from July 8, 1996 to March 9, 2001. This was Sanchez's first show after Magandang Umaga Po ended.

The program was an offshoot of the Balitang K segment of TV Patrol when different female pinch hitters that included Gel Santos-Relos, Kata Inocencio, Pia Hontiveros, Cathy Yang, Ces Drilon, and future anchor Sanchez replaced Mel Tiangco after the latter was suspended from the network in January 16, 1996 until Noli de Castro became the sole anchor of the newscast in July 1, 1996. TV Patrol was reformatted in July 1, 1996 because of the success of Mexican telenovela, Marimar aired on RPN. To improve the ratings of ABS-CBN, Balitang K was launched on July 8, 1996 as a pre-program to TV Patrol. Balitang K aired after the public service program, Hoy Gising!. The program was off the air from December 7, 2000 to January 16, 2001 due to the ongoing Impeachment trial of then President Joseph Estrada.

In 2001, TV Patrol anchor Noli de Castro ran for a senate seat and Sanchez was appointed as his replacement. Kris Aquino took over the latter's hosting job in the reformatted spin-off, Balitang Kris on March 12, 2001. However, this new program was cancelled due to low ratings. Aquino became the host of another talk show, Kris and Tell.

The format of Balitang K was reused for another show, Rated K, also hosted by Sanchez when the show moved to TV5 and was retitled as Rated Korina, after she signed a contract with Brightlight Productions on October 7, 2020. The second incarnation of Rated K premiered on the network's Saturday afternoon block on October 24, 2020.

== Hosts and reporters ==
=== Hosts ===
- Korina Sanchez

=== Reporters ===
- Julius Babao
- Christine Bersola-Babao
- Cheryl Cosim
- Gilbert Remulla
- Cherie Mercado
- Maricar Bautista
- Mario Dumaual
- Marc Logan
- Kat de Castro
- Doris Bigornia

== See also ==
- List of programs broadcast by ABS-CBN
- ABS-CBN News and Current Affairs
- Magandang Gabi... Bayan
