= Global City Innovative College =

Private college in Makati, Philippines

- Motto: Transforming Lives. Innovative Education.
- Type: Private tertiary school
- Established: February 2002
- Accreditation: Commission on Higher Education, Technical Education and Skills Development Authority
- Academic affiliations: St. Luke's Medical Center,
- Location: 444 EDSA, PET Plans Tower Annex, EDSA, Makati 1211, Metro Manila, Philippines; 14°33′43″N 121°02′34″E
- Colors: Yellow and green
- Website: www.global.edu.ph
- Location in Metro Manila Location in Luzon Location in the Philippines

Global City Innovative College is a private college in Makati, Metro Manila, Philippines. It began in 2002 when a group of entrepreneurs joined to establish the first collegiate education center in what was then the Fort Bonifacio Special Economic Zone. It is non-denominational, co-educational, and primarily serves the students in its area. Known as "the Yellow Building," the school was located along 31st Street at the corner of 2nd Avenue near Metro Manila's main thoroughfare, EDSA.

Course offerings include BS Business Administration, BS Hospitality Management, BS Accountancy, BS Tourism, BS Information Technology, BS Medical Technology and other Technical/ Vocational short courses. It is accredited by the Commission on Higher Education and the Technical Education and Skills Development Authority. GCIC now offers the Senior High School (SHS) program as approved by the Department of Education (DepEd).

== Administration ==
The school has a central administration led by Engr. Michael S. Tan and his team who oversees academic affairs, institutional development, community relations, international linkages and other operational concerns.

GCIC was established and opened in 2002 back when the Fort Bonifacio Area, now known as Bonifacio Global City ( BGC) was at its infancy at the Bonifacio Technology Center.
