= Good Morning, Kris =

2004 Philippine defunct television talk show of ABS-CBN

- Title Card
- Genre: Talk show
- Created by: ABS-CBN Corporation
- Developed by: ABS-CBN Corporation
- Written by: Kris Aquino
- Presented by: Kris Aquino
- Country of origin: Philippines
- Original language: Filipino
- No. of episodes: 95

Production
- Running time: 35-60 minutes
- Production companies: ABS-CBN Entertainment; Viva Entertainment; Viva Television

Original release
- Network: ABS-CBN
- Release: May 31 – October 8, 2004

Good Morning, Kris is a Philippine television talk show broadcast by ABS-CBN. Hosted by Kris Aquino, it aired from May 31 to October 8, 2004, replacing Morning Girls with Kris and Korina and was replaced by Morning Star.

The talk show is currently available online on Jeepney TV's YouTube Channel.

== Overview ==
=== Premiere ===
Good Morning, Kris premiered on May 31, 2004, after a very successful run of the morning show Morning Girls with Kris and Korina for 16 months. Kris Aquino was the sole host of the show, and it was aired live where its predecessor was before. It dealt with many subjects, whether lovelife or family problems.

=== Format ===
Aquino would sit on a sofa lounge chair, and the guest would sit in front of her or sometimes beside her, so that she can accommodate everyone and can easily talk to them. Although the show is somewhat similar to its predecessors, Aquino aims to give an aura to everyone who is in her show, whether her celebrity guest, the live studio audience, or the people who are watching her every day.

=== Notable guests ===
Some guests include Star Circle Quest alumnae Hero Angeles, where he discussed about his relationship with fellow alumnae and now Korean superstar Sandara Park and also include American Idol season 3 2nd Runner-up Jasmine Trias, where she sang a song together with Troy Montero.

=== Cancellation ===
The show was axed by the management after 5 months on October 8, 2004, due to low ratings against its competitor SiS. ABS-CBN executives decided to replace it with Morning Star which had a concept of talk-reality and was hosted by a number of assigned ABS-CBN talents.

== See also ==
- List of programs broadcast by ABS-CBN
