= Richard Loves Lucy =

- Genre: Sitcom
- Created by: ABS-CBN Studios
- Developed by: ABS-CBN Studios
- Directed by: Johnny Manahan
- Starring: Richard Gomez; Lucy Torres
- Opening theme: "Richard Loves Lucy (Sweetie Pie, Honey Pie)"
- Ending theme: "Richard Loves Lucy (Sweetie Pie, Honey Pie)"
- Country of origin: Philippines
- Original language: Filipino
- No. of episodes: 123

Production
- Running time: 30 minutes

Original release
- Network: ABS-CBN
- Release: November 15, 1998 – March 25, 2001

Richard Loves Lucy is a Philippine television sitcom series broadcast by ABS-CBN. It stars Richard Gomez and Lucy Torres. It aired from November 15, 1998 to March 25, 2001.

== Cast ==
=== Main cast ===
- Richard Gomez as Richard
- Lucy Torres as Lucy
- Kristine Hermosa
- Jolina Magdangal
- John Estrada
- Willie Revillame
- Gloria Romero

=== Supporting cast ===
- Wilma Doesnt
- Tintoy
- Berting Labra
- Whitney Tyson
- Patrick Garcia

=== Guest cast ===
- Troy Montero
- Patrick Garcia
- John Lloyd Cruz
