= Rated Korina =

Philippine television news magazine show

- Title card since 2020
- Also known as: Rated K: Handa na ba Kayo? (2004–07); Rated K (2005–20)
- Genre: Newscast, magazine, lifestyle
- Created by: ABS-CBN Studios (2004–20; since 2023); Albee Benitez (2020–21); Korina Sanchez-Roxas (since 2021)
- Developed by: ABS-CBN News and Current Affairs (2004–20; since 2023); Brightlight Productions (2020–23)
- Directed by: Kits Fernandez
- Presented by: Korina Sanchez-Roxas
- Country of origin: Philippines
- Original language: Filipino
- No. of episodes: 1,142

Production
- Running time: 45 minutes
- Production companies: ABS-CBN News and Current Affairs (2004–20; since 2023); Brightlight Productions (2020–23); Viktory 8 Media, Inc. (2020–present); News5 (2020–21)

Original release
- Network: ABS-CBN
- Release: May 30, 2004 – May 3, 2020
- Network: TV5
- Release: October 24, 2020 – present
- Network: Kapamilya Channel (Note: The show also airs on A2Z, on-demand via Kapamilya Online Live and iWant, and internationally via TFC.)
- Release: June 19, 2021 – present
- Network: All TV
- Release: June 29, 2025 – present

Related
- Balitang K; Rated Korina (DZMM)

Rated Korina, formerly Rated K and Rated K: Handa na ba Kayo?, is a Philippine television news magazine show broadcast by ABS-CBN, TV5, Kapamilya Channel, A2Z, and All TV. Hosted by Korina Sanchez-Roxas, it aired on the network's Sunday evening schedule from May 30, 2004 to May 3, 2020, replacing Sharon and was replaced by Iba 'Yan. The show aired on TV5 from October 24, 2020 to December 28, 2025 and returned on September 13, 2026.

== Overview ==
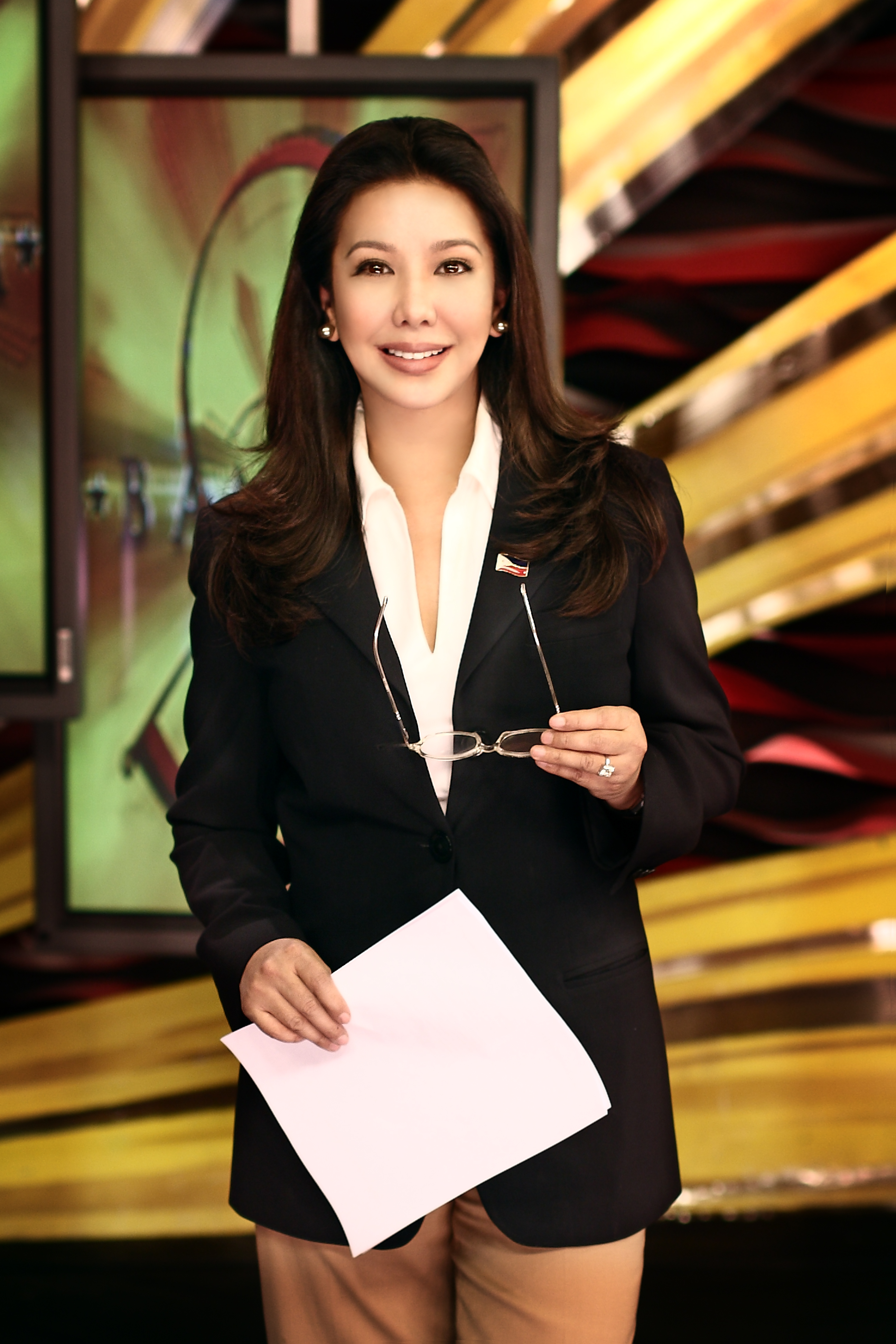
Korina Sanchez is the host.

The program includes stories about national issues, interviews with notable figures and newsmakers, and pieces about ordinary Filipinos who have had exceptional experiences. The show is known for its "Korina's Handog Tsinelas Campaign" initiative, which tries to improve the lives of millions of Filipino children one pair of slippers at a time.

== History ==
Rated Korina premiered as Balitang K in 1996, an offshoot of the Balitang K segment of TV Patrol. Anchors included Gel Santos-Relos, Kata Inocencio, Pia Hontiveros, Cathy Yang, and Ces Drilon. Future anchor Sanchez replaced Mel Tiangco after Tiangco's January 16, 1996 suspension from the network until Noli de Castro became the solo anchor on July 1 of that year.

The program aired on Sunday night during ABS-CBN's Yes Weekend! block. It aired a rerun on DZMM TeleRadyo on Monday at 2:00 pm on Tuesday at 1:00 am, and on Jeepney TV on Wednesday at 4:30 pm. Rated K also aired worldwide on the Filipino Channel (TFC). The program is similar in style and presentation to the newsmagazine show Balitang K, which was also hosted by Sanchez.

On August 11, 2019, Rated K was moved to Goin' Bulilit's 6:00 pm time slot of to make way for iWant Originals. The show was suspended on May 3, 2020, due to the ABS-CBN shutdown because of the cease and desist order of the National Telecommunications Commission (NTC) after the network's 25-year franchise expired on May 4. Rated K was cancelled by Kapamilya Channel and replaced by Iba 'Yan, hosted by Angel Locsin. Sanchez and its staff continued the program as an online show, using their social-media accounts.

It moved to TV5 as Rated Korina (using the former DZMM radio-program title) after Sanchez signed with Brightlight Productions on October 7, 2020. The second incarnation of Rated K premiered on the network's Saturday-afternoon block on October 24 as a co-production of Brightlight and Viktory 8 Media. The show went on hiatus on April 24, 2021, returning to TFC on May 29.

On June 19 and 20, 2021, the series returned for a new season. It began airing on ABS-CBN's Kapamilya Channel, Kapamilya Online Live, and ZOE TV's A2Z, maintaining its delayed broadcast on One PH and TV5.

On June 17, 2023, after more than two years of Brightlight co-production, co-production returned to ABS-CBN Studios and ABS-CBN News. The delayed telecast on One PH ended the following day, but TV5 airing continued. ABS-CBN resumed its role as primary distributor, using existing facilities for playout. Its Creative Communications Management (CCM) created the series' silent break bumper during commercial breaks on TV5 from June 17, 2023, to December 28, 2025, as part of airing ABS-CBN-produced shows on other channels not connected to the main Kapamilya Channel broadcast feed. The series airing is expanded to All TV on June 29, 2025, marking its return to channels 2 and 16 in Mega Manila and regional channels that were previously held by ABS-CBN until 2020, 14 months after ABS-CBN Corporation and Advanced Media Broadcasting System (AMBS) agreed to air ABS-CBN programs on the channel.

After ABS-CBN's December 2025 termination of the blocktime agreement with TV5, the show suspended its TV5 airing on December 28, 2025 and was replaced by the third season of TikTalks (a talk show hosted by Sanchez) on January 4, 2026. It continued to air on Kapamilya Channel, Kapamilya Online Live, A2Z, and All TV. The series resumed on TV5 after revival of the partnership with ABS-CBN on September 13, 2026.

== Radio program ==
A radio show, Rated Korina, an extension of Rated K, aired on DZMM and cable channel DZMM TeleRadyo from January 9, 2012, to January 3, 2014, when it was replaced by Sakto. Sanchez resigned from the radio program to pursue a master's degree at Ateneo de Manila University.

== Reception ==
Rated Korina, one of ABS-CBN's longest-running programs, covers trends in food, entertainment, leisure, science, and technology. The Manila Standard called it "one of the most trusted platforms of both local and international celebrities." The show was a finalist in the New York Festivals International TV and Film Awards twice (2009 and 2012), and Sanchez was "Highly Commended" in the 2012 Asian Television Awards' Current Affairs Presenter category.

Rated Korina is an eight-time Best Magazine Show winner at the PMPC Star Awards for Television, and Sanchez is a ten-time Best Magazine Show Host recipient. According to Kantar Media, the show had a 26.9-percent total Philippines household rating on June 24, 2012.

== See also ==
- List of programs broadcast by ABS-CBN
- List of Kapamilya Channel original programming
- List of Kapamilya Online Live original programming
- List of A2Z original programming
- List of All TV original programming
- List of TV5 original programming
- List of programs broadcast by True FM/One PH
