= Christine Bersola-Babao =

Filipina multi-media personality

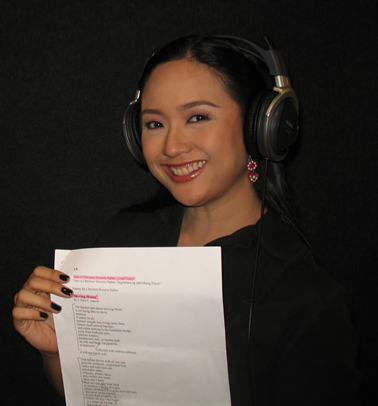
- Bersola-Babao in 2010
- Born: Maria Concepcion Peji Bersola; October 30, 1970 (age 55); Manila, Philippines
- Other names: Tintin, Mammu, Ninang Dub
- Education: University of the Philippines Diliman, Operation Brotherhood Montessori Center
- Occupations: Host, television producer
- Spouse: Julius Babao (m. 2003)
- Children: 2

YouTube information
- Channel: Christine Babao’s Channel
- Years active: 2018–present
- Genres: vlogs, talk show
- Subscribers: 235 thousand
- Views: 21.8 million
- Last updated: March 24, 2025

Maria Concepcion "Christine" Peji Bersola-Babao (Tagalog: [kɾisˈtin ˈpɛhɪ bɛɾˈsɔlɐ ˈbabaʊ]; born October 30, 1970), also known as Tin Tin, is a Filipina multi-media personality. She is best known for appearing in the educational television program Sine'skwela.

== Life and career ==
Christine Bersola-Babao is considered a "Celebrity Mother".

== Controversy ==
=== "Being Gay" interview article ===
On March 11, 2013, Christine Bersola-Babao published a newspaper article titled "Being Gay" where she interviewed the television psychologist Camille Garcia, a Catholic conservative on what to do when a child is showing "signs" of being gay. Bersola-Babao alsoadded her method of raising her three-year-old son. The article became a trending topic on Twitter.

The article also failed to cite peer reviewed studies to back it. The Psychological Association of the Philippines noted that this ran counter to the professional and ethical commitments of the Psychological Profession.

The Psychological Association of the Philippines stated:

The PAP enjoins Filipino psychologists to stand by their professional and ethical commitments to affirm the rights and wellbeing of all individuals. Its position paper on Non-Discrimination Based on Sexual Orientation, Gender Identity and Expression reads, “The PAP Code of Ethics (2010) is clear in its stance against discrimination. Filipino psychologists are called upon to recognize the unique worth and inherent dignity of all human beings; and to respect the diversity among persons and peoples. This means that Filipino psychologists should not discriminate against or demean persons based on actual or perceived differences in characteristics including gender identity and sexual orientation.

Bersola-Babao and Garcia's statements received criticism from Filipinos. The Ang Ladlad political party stated that “outdated and destructive gender stereotypes are not helpful and can have adverse effects on children’s sexual orientation and gender identity development.”

== Filmography ==
=== Television ===
Year	Title	Role	Notes
1993	Noli Me Tangere	Neneng	
1993–1996	TV Patrol	Anchor	
1995	Binibining Pilipinas 1995	Herself (host)	
1995–1997	Showbiz Lingo	Herself (host)	
1995–2002	Alas Singko y Medya	Herself (host)	
1997	Sine'skwela	Anatom	
2001–2002	Talk TV	Herself (host)	
2002–2005	Magandang Umaga, Bayan	Herself (host)	
2006	20th PMPC Star Awards for Television	Herself (host)	
2008–2009	Busog Lusog	Herself (host)	
2010–2011	Swak na Swak	Herself (host)	
2012–2014	Good Morning Club	Herself (host)	
2013–2014	Face the People	Herself (host)	
2022–present	Julius & Tintin: Para sa Pamilyang Pilipino	Herself (host)	

=== Film ===
Year	Title	Role	Note(s)	Ref(s).
1993	Dahil Mahal Kita (The Dolzura Cortez Story)	Nurse		
2003	Kung Ako Na Lang Sana	Vicky		
2006	Blue Moon	Herself		

== Awards and nominations ==
Year	Award	Category	Nominated work	Results
2000	PMPC Star Awards for Television	Best Morning Show Host	Alas Singko y Medya	Won
