= Morning Girls with Kris and Korina =

2002–04 Philippine defunct television talk show of ABS-CBN

- Genre: Talk show
- Created by: ABS-CBN Corporation
- Written by: Kris Aquino
- Presented by: As Morning Girls: Kris Aquino; Carmina Villarroel; Pops Fernandez; Zsa Zsa Padilla; Final format: Kris Aquino; Korina Sanchez
- Country of origin: Philippines
- Original language: Filipino
- No. of episodes: 476

Production
- Running time: 60 minutes
- Production company: ABS-CBN

Original release
- Network: ABS-CBN
- Release: July 22, 2002 – May 28, 2004

Related
- Talk TV; Good Morning, Kris

Morning Girls (formerly as Morning Girls with Kris and Korina) is a Philippine television talk show broadcast by ABS-CBN. Originally hosted by Kris Aquino, Pops Fernandez and Zsa Zsa Padilla, it aired from July 22, 2002, to May 28, 2004, replacing Talk TV and was replaced by Good Morning, Kris. Aquino and Korina Sanchez served as the final hosts.

== Original format ==
Morning Girls started as a replacement for ABS-CBN's Talk TV in 2002. It was originally hosted by the triumvirate of Kris Aquino, Pops Fernandez, and Zsa Zsa Padilla. Kris decided to quit hosting the show and was replaced by Carmina Villarroel until January 3, 2003, when Villaroel formally ended her contract with ABS-CBN and moved to rival network GMA 7. On the same period, Pops Fernandez also formally ended her contract with the station.

== Temporary stint ==
When Kris Aquino's love quarrel with Joey Marquez became known to the public, she decided to temporarily leave her hosting stint at Morning Girls. The replay of her exclusive "tell-all" interview with Korina Sanchez on TV Patrol was aired on September 25, 2003. When Aquino prepared to go back, she chose Morning Girls.

Because two of the original hosts moved to the rival station, ABS-CBN decided to tap Aquino and Korina Sanchez temporarily for two weeks until the show could be replaced. However, the two-week grace period proved to be successful, prompting the station to prolong the show.

== Guests and features ==
On its first anniversary, the show featured former President Corazon Aquino and former TV Patrol anchor and subsequent Vice President Noli de Castro. The show had the opportunity to serve as an avenue for certain politicians to discuss political issues during the lead-up to the 2004 national elections.

The morning talk show also managed to regularly invite and feature major celebrities from rival GMA Network, including Richard Gomez (who was formerly with ABS-CBN), Ogie Alcasid and Regine Velasquez (the latter two eventually joining ABS-CBN in the next decade). It also scored a ratings coup during the 2003 Christmas episode when the show guested Eat Bulaga! main hosts Vic Sotto and Joey de Leon (Eat Bulaga! itself was also aired on ABS-CBN from 1989 to 1995).

Morning Girls was also the show which revealed the relationship of one of its hosts, Korina Sanchez, with then-senator Mar Roxas; Roxas and Sanchez admitted their romantic relationship on the show. Some critics asserted that the revelation of their relationship helped Roxas to become the top senator in the 2004 elections.

== Awards ==
- PMPC TV Star Awards for Best Celebrity Talkshow
- PMPC TV Star Awards for Best Celebrity Talkshow Hosts for Kris and Korina.

== Controversies ==
Morning Girls became controversial when Kris accused a congressman of being disrespectful to the military in connection with the Oakwood mutiny, while Korina referred to Representative Clavel Martinez as bastos (rude). They were asked to attend a Congressional hearing to explain their statements, but they refused to attend on the legislator's first and second invitation. On the third invitation, Sanchez still refused but Aquino decided to show-up. As a result, Aquino was cleared, while Rep. Martinez asked that Korina show up or face repercussion. The controversy led to the exchange of statements between Representative Martinez and her fellow legislators and Kapisanan ng mga Brodkaster ng Pilipinas. The issue even caused the Martinez' Political clan of Cebu to ask Mar Roxas to make amends with Representative Martinez, so the latter would endorse Roxas' candidacy at Cebu.

== Cancellation ==
The show officially ended on May 28, 2004, when the network decided to tap Sanchez for Rated K, a news-magazine program on the station's Sunday slot, after Sharon temporarily went off-air due to Sharon Cuneta's pregnancy. Even if it originally served as an interim replacement for Sharon, it managed to last for 18 years because of its dedicated following, albeit rebranding as Rated Korina by 2020. Morning Girls was replaced by Good Morning, Kris – also hosted by Aquino – on May 31, 2004.

== See also ==
- List of programs broadcast by ABS-CBN
