= Kris Aquino =

Filipina television presenter and actress (born 1971)

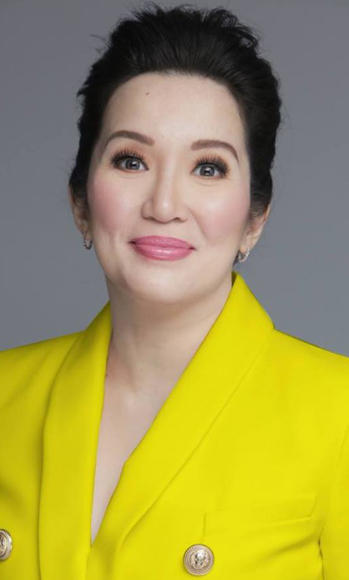
- Aquino in 2018
- Born: Kristina Bernadette Cojuangco Aquino; February 14, 1971 (age 55); Quezon City, Rizal, Philippines
- Occupations: Television presenter; actress; film producer
- Title: Queen of All Media
- Spouse: James Yap (m. 2005; ann. 2012)
- Children: 2, including Bimby
- Parents: Ninoy Aquino; Corazon Aquino
- Relatives: Juan Sumulong (great-grandfather); Lorenzo Sumulong (granduncle); Francisco Sumulong (granduncle); Jose W. Diokno (seventh cousin once removed) (Note: Diokno's ancestor is Demetria Sumulong who was born in Antipolo before moving south; her common ancestor with Aquino is Francisco Sumulong (born c. 1700).); Chel Diokno (seventh cousin twice removed); Maris Diokno (seventh cousin twice removed)
- Family: Aquino; Cojuangco
- Years active: 1986–2022; 2026–present
- Works: Filmography
- Awards: Full list

Aquino in 2014

Kristina Bernadette Cojuangco Aquino (locally [ˌkɾis ʔɐˈxiː.no]; born February 14, 1971) is a Filipina television presenter, actress, talent manager and film producer. She is a recipient of 42 PMPC Star Awards for Television, 10 Golden Screen Awards and a FAMAS Award.

Dubbed the Philippines' "Queen of All Media", Aquino has hosted numerous talk shows and game shows, starred in several films and television series, and is active in social media. She is the youngest daughter of former senator Ninoy Aquino and Corazon Aquino, who served as the 11th president of the Philippines, while her brother Benigno Aquino III served as the 15th president of the Philippines.

Her debut film appearance was in Pido Dida: Sabay Tayo (1990) and she is also known for her roles in horror films Feng Shui (2004) and Sukob (2006), the highest-grossing Filipino films of its respective years. She is also widely known as a celebrity product endorser and a philanthropist who advocates for lupus awareness, children's rights, LGBTQ rights, culture and art appreciation, freedom of expression, and democratic reforms.

== Early life and education ==
Kristina Bernadette Cojuangco Aquino was born in Quezon City, Rizal, to Corazon Cojuangco-Aquino and Benigno Aquino Jr. who was, at the time, a senator of the Ferdinand Marcos regime. The youngest of five children, her siblings are Maria Elena "Ballsy" Aquino-Cruz, Aurora Corazon "Pinky" Aquino-Abellada, former Philippine President Benigno S. Aquino III, and Victoria Elisa "Viel" Aquino-Dee. She is the cousin of actress and equestrienne Mikee Cojuangco, and the niece of former Philippine Olympic Committee president Jose "Peping" Cojuangco Jr. When she was a baby, her father was arrested and jailed; her mother raised Aquino and her siblings.

During the 1978 parliamentary elections when her jailed father was a candidate, the seven-year-old Aquino was a stand-in for him at campaign rallies. She was featured on the front page of The New York Times and on the cover of Time Magazine. Aquino spent most of her elementary school days in the United States, where the Aquino family was in exile. When she was 12 years old, her father was assassinated on the tarmac of Manila International Airport. Kris Aquino returned to the Philippines and attended rallies against the Marcos regime.

After the Philippine Revolution of 1986, which removed Ferdinand Marcos from his 21-year regime, the teenage Aquino began guesting stints on television dramas and comedies, as well as talk shows. She made her film debut with actor-comedian Rene Requiestas in Pido Dida, which was a blockbuster hit. Aquino had a commercially steady career, and managed to score an acting nomination for The Fatima Buen Story. She starred in a film based on a true-to-life murder, the Vizconde massacre. Its financial success and numerous starring appearances in crime films of the same vein, earned her the nickname "Massacre Queen" by newspaper critics.

Aquino finished her elementary school education at the Poveda Learning Center (now Saint Pedro Poveda College) in Quezon City. She went to high school at the Colegio San Agustin-Makati, where she was batchmates with Pinky Webb and Karen Davila.

After graduation from high school in March 1988, she proceeded to the Ateneo de Manila University for college, earning her Bachelor of Arts degree in English Literature in 1992.

== Career ==
=== Television ===
Aquino shifted her sights to a television career as a showbiz talk show host with the launching of the talk show Kris. It was produced by Viva Television on the People's Television Network. It was on GMA Network's showbiz oriented talk show Startalk, which she co-hosted with Boy Abunda and Lolit Solis, that her hosting skills attracted attention.

She later joined ABS-CBN as a contract artist and was launched in morning talk show Today with Kris Aquino. Following are showbiz-oriented talk show The Buzz alongside Boy Abunda and game show Game KNB?. From 2002 to 2004, she hosted the talk show Morning Girls with Kris and Korina with known broadcast journalist Korina Sanchez.

In 2007, Aquino took a showbiz break leaving The Buzz and the reformatted Pilipinas, Game Ka Na Ba? where she was replaced by Edu Manzano, when she gave birth to her second son.

Aquino also hosted the Philippine franchise of Deal or No Deal, which is part of ABS-CBN's primetime lineup, where she also appeared on the US version as part of a Deal or No Deal "around the world" event which hosted by Howie Mandel in May 2008.

She also hosted Boy & Kris, a morning talk show that replaced Homeboy, together with Boy Abunda, Be Bench, a model search show together with Piolo Pascual, another TV franchise, Wheel of Fortune, which replaced Kapamilya, Deal or No Deal and marks her return on The Buzz in 2014.

In 2011, Aquino hosted Kris TV, a lifestyle-magazine talk show which airs weekday mornings on ABS-CBN. The show ran from June 2011 to April 2016 prior to Aquino officially leaving her home network for 20 years.

Also in 2011, she hosted the Filipino version of The Price is Right.

=== Film ===
Aquino began her film career with Regal Films, one of the oldest film companies in the Philippines, appearing in Pido Dida: Sabay Tayo (1990), and its sequels with comedian Rene Requiestas. It earned her first box office queen award. She later shifted to dramatisations of true crime, including The Vizconde Massacre Story, Myrna Diones Story, Elsa Castillo-Ang Katotohanan, and Humanda Ka Mayor.

She won her first supporting actress award in 2002 for Mano Po, for her portrayal of a weak-willed and submissive scion of a wealthy Filipino-Chinese clan. In the 2004 film So... Happy Together she played opposite Eric Quizon.

Other films include: Feng Shui, a Star Cinema production that featured Chinese influences and omen. Feng Shui, which was made during the wave of "Asian-style horror" flicks that spread throughout the continent after 2002's. The Ring made P137 million. It was the highest grossing Filipino movie of 2004, and the second most successful movie overall that year, next to Spider-Man 2, which earned more than P225 million. In 2006, Sukob, another horror thriller, became the highest grossing Filipino film of all time surpassing Ang Tanging Ina and Anak. She also starred alongside Vice Ganda and Ai-Ai delas Alas in Sisterakas, a 2012 Metro Manila Film Festival entry.

In 2018, she played Princess Intan in Crazy Rich Asians.

== Illness ==
Aquino's health has deteriorated by 2022. Aquino was diagnosed with chronic spontaneous urticaria in 2018 after undergoing tests in Singapore out of concern that she might be suffering from lupus. In May 2022, Aquino disclosed that she has a life-threatening condition but dispelled rumors that she was "dying" and confined in an intensive care unit. She has also been stated to have autoimmune thyroiditis and vasculitis.

In June 2022, she disclosed her eosinophilic granulomatosis with polyangiitis diagnosis, adding that she is going to reside in the United States to receive treatment for her condition.

As of October 2023, Aquino is living in Orange County, California.

In the Valentine's Day 2024 episode of Fast Talk with Boy Abunda, Aquino, via Zoom revealed that her hemoglobin count dropped to an alarming 8.7, her face has a butterfly rash due to a fifth autoimmune disease and has several light scratches, an effect of eosinophilic granulomatosis with polyangiitis. She also suffers from fluctuating blood pressure, swollen knees and bones per Mixed connective tissue disease, CREST syndrome and Rheumatoid arthritis and her heart's muscles around it were swollen. In September, she returned to the Philippines to begin her second immunosuppressant infusions for her six autoimmune conditions. In November, Kris underwent a PICC line insertion in a peripheral vein.

In February 2025, Aquino was diagnosed with fibromyalgia. In April 2025, she revealed that she had been diagnosed with a total of nine autoimmune diseases and was being confined at a "safe zone" in Bonifacio Global City.

In May 2026, Aquino confirms she was tested positive for COVID-19.

== Personal life ==
Aquino had a relationship with actor Phillip Salvador and had their first son, Joshua, in 1994.

In 2003, her relationship with comedian Joey Marquez was highly publicized after their breakup in which Aquino exposed Marquez on contracting her with STD.

Aquino was married to PBA professional player James Yap in a civil marriage ceremony on July 10, 2005, and announced the following year that she was pregnant, following a controversy in 2006 on Yap's infidelity.

In April 2007, Aquino gave birth to her second son, James Carlos "Bimby" Aquino Yap Jr., in Makati.

In 2010, Aquino announced that she had separated from Yap, citing personal reasons, and stated she was seeking an annulment. It was in February 2012 that their marriage was declared null and void.

Aquino was amidst another public scandal in 2018 making death verbal threats via telephone to her former business manager, Nicko Falcis as their business relationship gradually ended. This was after her filing numerous cases against Falcis, majority of which got dismissed and are now under mediation. Currently, Aquino has no business partner nor business manager.

In October 2021, Aquino announced her engagement to former politician Mel Senen Sarmiento. However, in January 2022, Aquino announced via Instagram that she and Sarmiento both agreed to call off the engagement. In June 2024, Aquino confirmed a new romantic relationship with a boyfriend, Dr. Michael Padlan, a then-53 years old Makati Medical Center surgeon, who has 2 children from a previous marriage.

== Business ventures ==
Aside from her TV and movie career, Aquino owns and manages several businesses. She co-owns Lena Restaurant and Sencillo, a Mexican restaurant, as well as Roberto Antonio, an upscale flower shop with business partner Boy Abunda.

She founded a boutique and agency in partnership with Abunda and other personalities including Nonon del Carmen and Agnes Maranan. The boutique and agency was named MAD (an acronym for their surnames). She co-owns Sierra Madre Water. Aquino also owns numerous fast food store franchises such as Jollibee and Chowking and owns Nacho Bimby (aka Potato Corner) - a company that's under her youngest son's namesake.

She is also executive editor of a bi-monthly magazine called K! The Kris Aquino Magazine. In December 2009, Aquino showcased her home collection called K Everyday. In partnership with ABS-CBN Licensing, K Everyday features cooking, kitchen-wares, plastic, and stationery collections.

== Production company ==
K Productions
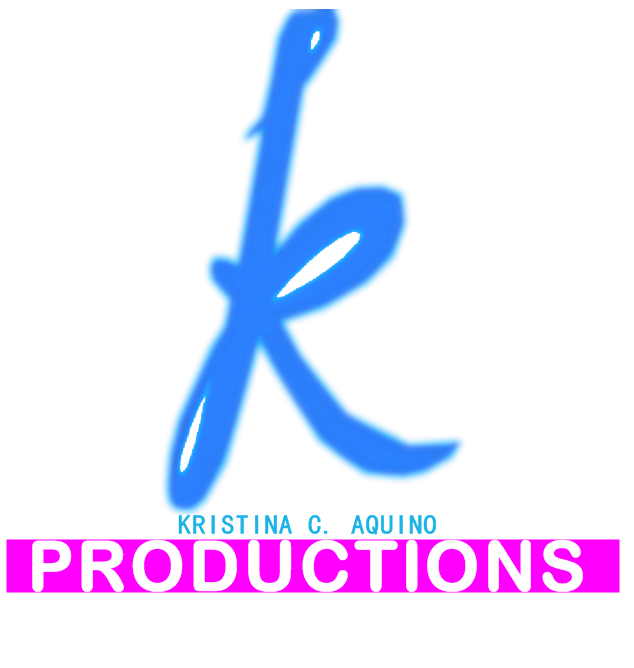
- Type: Subsidiary
- Industry: Motion picture Film distribution Television
- Founded: 2013
- Defunct: 2014
- Headquarters: Quezon City, Philippines
- Area served: Philippines
- Key people: Kristina Bernadette C. Aquino; Tess V. Fuentes
- Products: Film; Vlog
- Parent: ABS-CBN Corporation
- Subsidiaries: ABS-CBN Film Productions, Inc.

In 2013, Aquino established a film and television production company, and film distributor called Kris Aquino Productions (or K Productions).

It is managed by Star Cinema, the country's largest motion picture company, which has produced most of the highest grossing Filipino films of all time. Its debut film was Instant Mommy starring Eugene Domingo. She produced her son's debut movie, My Little Bossings, in 2013.

Starting in 2010, she had already begun co-producing Star Cinema films in which she starred, including Dalaw (2010), Segunda Mano (2011), and Sisterakas (2012).

In 2015, Aquino started producing vlogs on her own website, featuring specifically cooking and travel vlogs.

=== Theatrical feature films ===
Year	Release date	Film	Cast	Production company (ies)	Director
2013	July 27; August 28	Instant Mommy	Eugene Domingo	Cinemalaya; Quantum Films	Leo Abaya
2013	December 25	My Little Bossings	Kris Aquino; Vic Sotto; Bimby Aquino Yap; Ryzza Mae Dizon	OctoArts Films; M - Zet TV Productions, Inc. APT Entertainment	Marlon N. Rivera
2014	December 25	Feng Shui 2	Kris Aquino; Coco Martin	ABS-CBN Film Productions, Inc.	Chito Roño
