= Korina Sanchez-Roxas =

Filipino journalist (born 1964)

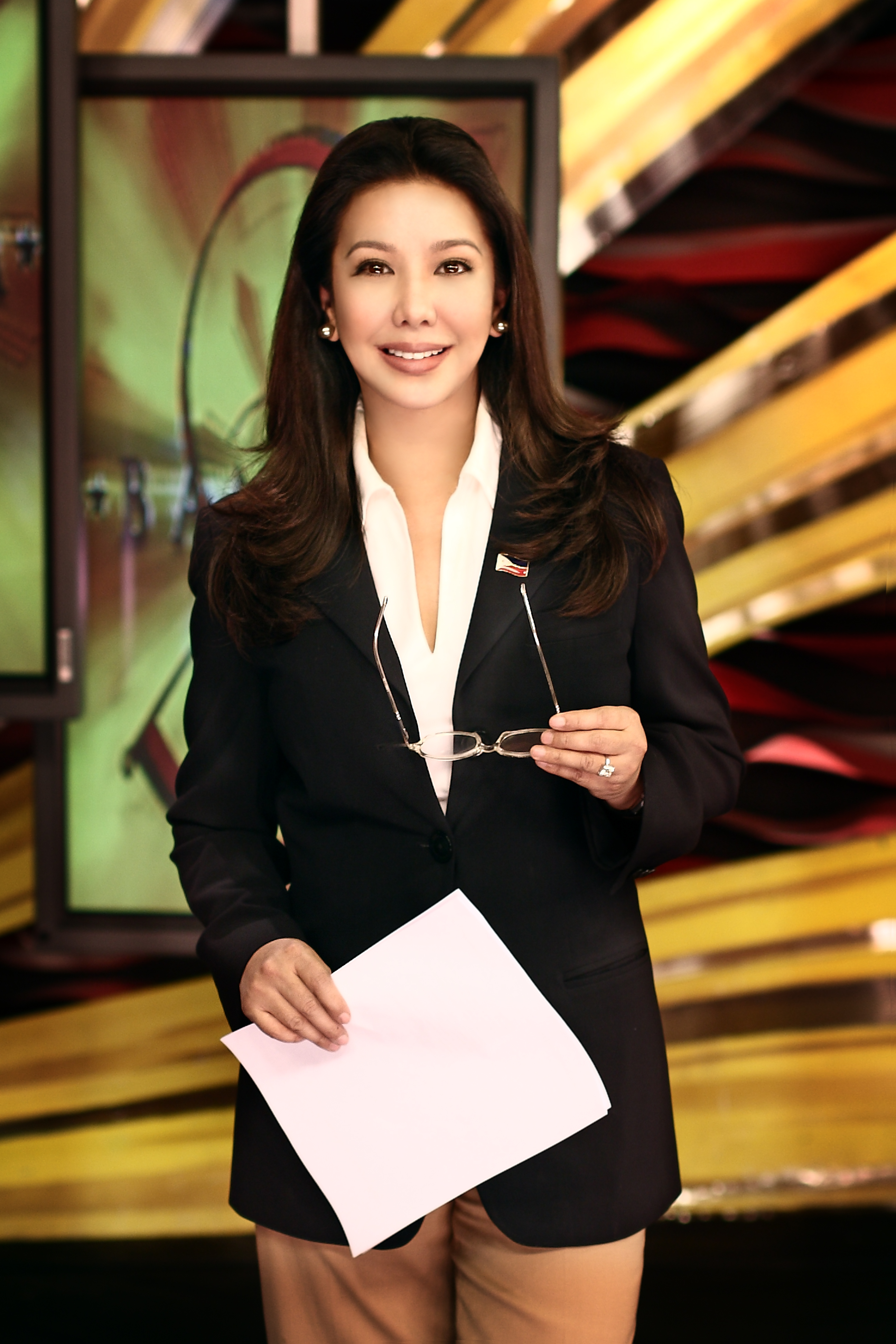
- Sanchez in 2009
- Born: Korina Maria Baluyut Sanchez; October 5, 1964 (age 62); Victoria, Hong Kong
- Other names: Ate Koring, Korina, Koring, K
- Education: Maryknoll College (BA); Ateneo de Manila University (MA)
- Occupation: Journalist
- Years active: 1982–present
- Agents: RPN-9 (1982–1984); MBS-4 (1984–1985) City2 Television (1985–1986) Eagle Broadcasting Corporation (2022–2023) ABS-CBN (1986–2020, 2023–present) TV5 (2020–present); Brightlight Productions (2020–present); ALLTV (2024–present); Bilyonaryo News Channel (2024–present); CLTV36 (2026–present)
- Notable credits: Balitang K; TV Patrol; Bandila; Face to Face with Ate Koring; Korina Interviews; Morning Girls with Kris and Korina; Rated K/Rated Korina
- Spouse: Mar Roxas (m. 2009)
- Children: 2

Korina Maria Baluyut Sanchez-Roxas (Tagalog: [kɔˈɾina ˈsɐntʃes ˈɾɔhas]; born October 5, 1964) is a Filipino broadcast journalist, television news anchor, senior field reporter, magazine show host, radio anchor, newspaper columnist and musician. She served as chief correspondent for the Integrated News and Current Affairs Division of ABS-CBN airing on TV Channel 2, AM Radio Station DZMM and cable TV network ABS-CBN News Channel. She also has a regular column in The Philippine Star entitled That Does It, as well as a Tagalog column entitled K Ka Lang in its sister newspaper, Pilipino Star Ngayon. Sanchez currently serves as an anchor of Bilyonaryo News Channel and CLTV36's flagship Filipino language newscast, Agenda.

She is married to Mar Roxas, the former Secretary of the Department of the Interior and Local Government. She transferred to TV5 after signing with Brightlight Productions on 2020. On June 17, 2023, she returned to ABS-CBN when production of Rated Korina returned to the said network with its new co-production deal was sign on July 5 while still concurrently working for TV5.

== Personal life ==
Sanchez married Mar Roxas on October 27, 2009, in Quezon City. On February 12, 2019, her twin children with spouse, Mar Roxas, Pepe and Pilar were born via gestational surrogacy in the United States.

== Education ==
Sanchez finished high school at Saint Theresa's College of Quezon City. She attended Maryknoll College and graduated with a Bachelor of Arts degree in communication arts. She attended the Ateneo de Manila University, where she graduated with a master's degree in journalism on June 26, 2016.

== Filmography ==
=== Television ===
Year	Title	Role
1986–1991	Magandang Umaga Po	Host
1987–1996	TV Patrol	Reporter/Substitute Anchor for Mel Tiangco
1992–1996	Hoy Gising!	Host
1996–2001	Balitang K	Host
1998–2001	The Correspondents	Host
2001–2004; 2010–2015	TV Patrol	News Anchor
2003–2004	Morning Girls with Kris and Korina	Host
2004–present	Rated K/Rated Korina	Host
2006–2009	Bandila	News Anchor
2007	News Patrol Special Edition	News Anchor
2022–2023	Korina Interviews	Host
2024–present	Agenda	News Anchor
2024–present	Face to Face with Ate Koring	Host

== Radio ==
Year	Title
1991–1996	Aksyon Ngayon
1996–2001, 2004–2009	Tambalang Failon at Sanchez
2001–2004	Korina sa Umaga
2012–2014	Rated Korina
2026–present	Memo with Korina

== Controversies ==
In 2013, Sanchez drew flak among netizens due to her remarks on her now-defunct DZMM radio show Rated Korina on Anderson Cooper's reporting for Tacloban. She claimed that the journalist did not know what he was talking about. CNN news anchor Anderson Cooper was one of the first international correspondents on the ground in Tacloban to report on the aftermath of Typhoon Haiyan. Cooper responded to Sanchez by urging her to visit the area and insisted that his coverage was accurate.

On December 3, 2014, newscast of ABS-CBN's TV Patrol, Sanchez said she hoped Typhoon Ruby (international name for Typhoon Hagupit) would hit Japan instead of the Philippines: "Can’t they just get all of it?" Six weeks after this incident, Sanchez was removed from her radio show.

=== 2016 presidential campaign ===
To gain support from the LGBT community for the 2016 presidential elections, Sánchez organized #KERIBEKS: The First National Gay Congress of The Philippines, which was a star studded concert held at the Araneta Coliseum (owned by the family of Mar Roxas) which featured job fairs but did not deal with LGBT issues nor did Mar Roxas vocalize support for the LGBT.

=== Discaya interviews ===
On August 21, 2025, Vico Sotto (then Pasig City mayor) alleged that two interviews of 2025 Pasig City mayoral candidate Sarah Discaya, who later became notorious as the president of Alpha & Omega General Contractor & Development Corporation, one of the top 15 flood control contractors revealed in a list prepared by then President Bongbong Marcos on August 11, 2025, were paid by Sanchez and by fellow ex-ABS-CBN news anchor Julius Babao (uploaded on his YouTube channel) by about Php 20 million. Sotto questioned why would a subject be willing to spend millions to be featured. Sotto added, "Before well-known journalists accept an offer to interview a contractor entering politics, didn’t they think, ‘Wait, why is this person ready to pay 10 million just for me to interview them?". Sanchez's producers then released a statement stating that Sotto's accusations were "slanderous" and considered as "cyberlibel", but later reissued the statement removing the part where Sanchez admits to have "only found out she was interviewing a Pasig mayoralty candidate on the day itself", and added a claim that they also reached out to Sotto's mother Coney Reyes about the feature but alleged that Reyes "had always declined requests for an interview."

== Awards, honors and recognitions ==
=== 2012 ===
Asian TV Awards

- Best Current Affairs Presenter Category: Highly Commended, Korina Sanchez, Rated K (Episode: "Kwento ng Buhay Ko")

Media Newser Philippines’ Media Winner of 2012

- Ka Doroy Broadcaster of the Year Award, Korina Sanchez
- Best Magazine Host for TV, Korina Sanchez
- Best Public Affairs Program Host for Radio, Korina Sanchez
- Best Public Affairs Program, 'Tambalang Failon at Sanchez', DZMM
- Best Magazine Show, Rated K

=== 2013 ===
- Volunteers Against Crime and Corruption (VACC) Awards
- Outstanding Radio Anchor – Korina Sanchez

=== 2016 ===
30th PMPC Star Awards for Television

- Best Magazine Show
- Best Magazine Show Host
