= Star Awards for Television =

Philippine award ceremony

PMPC Star Awards for Television
- Current: 37th PMPC Star Awards for Television
- Awarded for: Excellence in Philippine television
- Country: Philippines
- Presented by: Philippine Movie Press Club
- First award: 1987; 39 years ago

Television/radio coverage
- Network: ABS-CBN (1988–1989, 2009–2019); TV5 (2008); RPN (1987, 1990, 2000–2004, 2006–2007); IBC (1991–1999, 2005); STV (2021); A2Z (2025)

Star Awards for Television is an annual award-giving body recognizing the outstanding television programming produced by the several networks in the Philippines.

Described as the Philippine equivalent of the Emmy Awards, it was founded by the Philippine Movie Press Club, an organization of entertainment writers and reporters in 1987.

The PMPC Star Awards for Television is originally held in October (1987–2004, 2006, 2016, 2018–2019 and 2021), November (2007–2014 and 2017) and/or December (2005 and 2015). But due to the awarding event skips the 4th quarter of a previous year, It is held in January (2023), March (2025) and August (2025). They are seen in rotation among the television channels such as ABS-CBN 2 (1988–1989 and 2009–2019), TV5 (2008), RPN 9 (1987, 1990, 2000–2004 and 2006–2007), IBC 13 (1991–1999 and 2005), STV (2021) and A2Z 11 (2025).

== Ceremonies ==
#	Date	Year	Host(s)	Network	Site	Best Drama Series	Best Comedy/Gag Show
1st	October 28, 1987	1987	Edu Manzano	RPN 9	Araneta Coliseum	Lovingly Yours, Helen	Hapi House
2nd	October 15, 1988	1987-88	Unknown	ABS-CBN	Araneta Coliseum		Sic O'Clock News
3rd	October 28, 1989	1988-89	German Moreno; Eddie Garcia	Unknown	Metropolitan Theater	Lovingly Yours, Helen	Family 3+1
4th	October 27, 1990	1989-90	Eric Quizon; Gabby Concepcion; Vilma Santos	RPN 9	Metropolitan Theater		Sic O'Clock News
5th	October 26, 1991	1990-91	Vilma Santos; Eric Quizon; Vic Sotto; Mari Kaimo	IBC 13	Metropolitan Theater	Agila	Abangan ang Susunod Na Kabanata; Mongolian Barbecue
6th	October 24, 1992	1991-92	Bert Marcelo; Eric Quizon; Vilma Santos; Vic Sotto	IBC 13	Metropolitan Theater	Valiente	Family 3+1; Mongolian Barbecue
7th	October 23, 1993	1992-93	Pilita Corrales; Boots Anson-Roa; Johnny Litton; Miguel Rodriguez; Aga Muhlach; Lorna Tolentino	IBC 13	Philippine International Convention Center	Valiente	Home Along Da Riles; Mongolian Barbecue
8th	October 15, 1994	1993-94	Noel Trinidad; Tessie Tomas; Herbert Bautista; Donna Cruz; Mari Kaimo; Loren Legarda; Rustom Padilla; Carmina Villarroel; Rowell Santiago; Mikee Cojuangco; Miguel Rodriguez; Jackie Lou Blanco; Richard Gomez; Aiko Melendez	IBC 13	UP Theater	Valiente	Home Along Da Riles; Mixed N.U.T.S
9th	October 14, 1995	1994-95	Kris Aquino; Pops Fernandez; Mikee Cojuangco; Rustom Padilla; Edu Manzano	IBC 13	UP Theater	Valiente	Okay Ka, Fairy Ko! Tropang Trumpo
10th	October 1996	1995-96	Unknown	IBC 13	UP Theater	Villa Quintana	Bubble Gang
11th	October 11, 1997	1996-97	Unknown	IBC 13	UP Theater	Familia Zaragoza	Bubble Gang
12th	October 10, 1998	1997-98	Dina Bonnevie; G. Toengi; Paolo Bediones; Albert Martinez; Rustom Padilla	IBC 13	UP Theater	Mula sa Puso	1 for 3 Bubble Gang
13th	October 16, 1999	1998-99	Unknown	IBC 13	UP Theater	Marinella	Beh Bote Nga; Bubble Gang
14th	October 7, 2000	1999-2000	Pops Fernandez; Troy Montero; Dingdong Dantes; Ralion Alonzo; Kris Aquino	RPN 9	UP Theater	Kirara, Ano ang Kulay ng Pag-ibig?	Kool Ka Lang; Bubble Gang
15th	October 6, 2001	2000-01	Unknown	RPN 9	UP Theater	Pangako Sa 'Yo	Idol Ko si Kap; Bubble Gang
16th	October 12, 2002	2001-02	Boy Abunda; Ai-Ai delas Alas; Charlene Gonzales; Gretchen Barretto; Pops Fernandez; Regine Velasquez; Piolo Pascual; Bong Revilla; Phillip Salvador; Dingdong Dantes	RPN 9	UP Theater	Kung Mawawala Ka	Kool Ka Lang; Bubble Gang
17th	October 11, 2003	2002-03	Kris Aquino; Boy Abunda; Lorna Tolentino; Bong Revilla; Charlene Gonzales; Paolo Bediones; Sharon Cuneta	RPN 9	UP Theater	Kay Tagal Kang Hinintay	OK Fine, Whatever; Bubble Gang
18th	October 23, 2004	2003-04	Lorna Tolentino; Boy Abunda; Piolo Pascual	RPN 9	Aliw Theater	Marina; Ikaw sa Puso Ko	Daddy Di Do Du; OK Fine, Whatever; Bubble Gang
19th	December 6, 2005 (Taped); December 7, 2005 (Delayed Telecast)	2004-05	Boy Abunda	IBC 13	Party Central	Mulawin; Saang Sulok ng Langit	Daddy Di Do Du; Bubble Gang; Goin' Bulilit
20th	October 23, 2006 (Taped); October 28, 2006 (Delayed Telecast)	2005-06	Boy Abunda; Tin Tin Bersola-Babao; Jean Garcia; Toni Gonzaga; Joey Marquez	RPN 9	UP Theater	Sa Piling Mo; Now and Forever	Bahay Mo Ba 'To? Bubble Gang
21st	November 18, 2007 (Taped); November 25, 2007 (Delayed Telecast)	2006-07	Boy Abunda; Pops Fernandez; Ara Mina; Lorna Tolentino	RPN 9	Henry Lee Irwin Theater	Maging Sino Ka Man; Love Spell; Sinasamba Kita	Bahay Mo Ba 'To? Bubble Gang
22nd	November 30, 2008 (Taped); December 2, 2008 (Delayed Telecast)	2007-08	Paolo Bediones; Gabby Concepcion; Anne Curtis; Judy Ann Santos	TV5	SMX Convention Center	Lobo; Kaputol ng Isang Awit	Ful Haus; Goin' Bulilit
23rd	November 29, 2009	2008-09	Piolo Pascual; Carmina Villarroel; John Lloyd Cruz	ABS-CBN	PAGCOR Grand Theater	May Bukas Pa; Pieta	Ful Haus; Banana Split; Bubble Gang
24th	November 13, 2010 (Taped); November 20, 2010 (Delayed Telecast)	2009-10	Angel Aquino; Ruffa Gutierrez; Miriam Quiambao	ABS-CBN	Newport Performing Arts Theater	Dahil May Isang Ikaw; Rosalka	Show Me Da Manny; Banana Split
25th	November 22, 2011 (Taped); November 27, 2011 (Delayed Telecast)	2010-11	Piolo Pascual; Shamcey Supsup; Richard Gomez; Dawn Zulueta	ABS-CBN	Newport Performing Arts Theater	Minsan Lang Kita Iibigin; Little Star	Pepito Manaloto; Bubble Gang
26th	November 18, 2012 (Taped); November 25, 2012 (Delayed Telecast)	2011-12	Aga Muhlach; Kris Aquino; Toni Gonzaga	ABS-CBN	Henry Lee Irwin Theater	Amaya	Toda Max
27th	November 24, 2013 (Taped); December 1, 2013 (Delayed Telecast)	2012-13	Alex Gonzaga; Toni Gonzaga; Raymond Gutierrez; Richard Gutierrez	ABS-CBN	AFP Theater	Juan dela Cruz; Be Careful With My Heart	Pepito Manaloto; Banana Split; Bubble Gang
28th	November 23, 2014 (Taped); November 30, 2014 (Delayed Telecast)	2013-14	Iza Calzado; Kim Chiu; Enchong Dee; Piolo Pascual	ABS-CBN	Solaire Resort and Casino Grand Ballroom	Ikaw Lamang; Be Careful With My Heart	Home Sweetie Home; Bubble Gang; Goin' Bulilit
29th	December 3, 2015 (Taped); December 6, 2015 (Delayed Telecast)	2014-15	Boy Abunda; Gelli de Belen; Maja Salvador; Enchong Dee; Christian Bautista; Toni Gonzaga	ABS-CBN	Kia Theatre	Bridges of Love; The Half Sisters	Pepito Manaloto; Banana Split
30th	October 23, 2016 (Taped); November 20, 2016 (Delayed Telecast)	2015-16	Robi Domingo; Alex Gonzaga; Luis Manzano; Jodi Sta. Maria; Kim Chiu; Xian Lim	ABS-CBN	Novotel Manila Araneta Center Monet Grand Balroom	Ang Probinsyano; Doble Kara	Pepito Manaloto; Goin' Bulilit
31st	November 12, 2017 (Taped); November 19, 2017 (Delayed Telecast)	2016-17	Ruffa Gutierrez; Richard Gutierrez; Robi Domingo; Jodi Sta. Maria	ABS-CBN	Henry Lee Irwin Theater	La Luna Sangre tied with Alyas Robin Hood; The Greatest Love	Pepito Manaloto; Goin' Bulilit
32nd	October 14, 2018 (Taped); October 28, 2018 (Delayed Telecast)	2017-18	Julia Barretto; Robi Domingo; Raymond Gutierrez; Yassi Pressman; Jodi Sta. Maria	ABS-CBN	Henry Lee Irwin Theater	The Good Son; Contessa	Pepito Manaloto; Goin' Bulilit
33rd	October 13, 2019 (Taped); October 20, 2019 (Delayed Telecast)	2018-19	Kathryn Bernardo; Kim Chiu; Enchong Dee; Robi Domingo	ABS-CBN	Henry Lee Irwin Theater	The General's Daughter; Kadenang Ginto	Banana Sundae
34th	October 17, 2021	2019-20	Sanya Lopez; Alfred Vargas	STV	MOWELFUND Studio	Pamilya Ko; Madrasta	Pepito Manaloto
35th	January 28, 2023	2020-21	Pops Fernandez; Aiko Melendez; John Estrada	JAMSAP Entertainment Corporation YouTube Channel	Winford Manila Resort and Casino	Huwag Kang Mangamba; Prima Donnas	Pepito Manaloto
~~36th~~	Not held						
37th	August 24, 2025	2022-23	Boy Abunda; Pops Fernandez; Gela Atayde; Elijah Canlas; Robi Domingo	None	VS Hotel Convention Center	Maria Clara at Ibarra; Abot-Kamay na Pangarap	Pepito Manaloto
38th	March 23, 2025 (Taped); April 5, 2025 (Delayed Telecast)	2024	Kim Chiu; Piolo Pascual; Alden Richards	A2Z	Dolphy Theatre	FPJ's Batang Quiapo; Abot-Kamay na Pangarap	Pepito Manaloto

== Categories ==
=== Programming ===
- Best Children Show (not given in 2005 and 2016-2017)
- Best Educational Program (not given in 1998 and 2023)
- Best Lifestyle Show (since 2001)
- Best Travel Show (since 2006)
- Best Morning Show (since 1999)
- Best Sports Show
- Best Public Affairs Program
- Best Magazine Show
- Best Documentary Program
- Best Public Service Program (not given in 1998)
- Best News Program
- Best Talent Search Program (since 2004; not given in 2018) [or Best Talent Show since 1987 to early 1990s]
- Best Game Show (1988-2017, except 1991, 1998, 2009-2010 and 2012)
- Best Comedy Show
- Best Celebrity Talk Show
- Best Showbiz-Oriented Talk Show (1990-2015 and 2025)
- Best Variety Show (not given in 2015)
- Best Musical Variety Show
- Best Drama Series [a single category] (1987–2003, 2012)
  - Best Primetime Drama Series (2004–2011, 2013 to present)
  - Best Daytime Drama Series (2004–2011, 2013 to present)
  - Best Drama Mini-Series (1992, 1998, 2000-2002, 2009–2011, 2015, 2023 to present)
- Best Drama Anthology (since 1992)
- Best Horror / Fantasy Program (2000-2013, 2017 to present)

=== Performing ===
- Best Travel Show Host (since 2006)
- Best Children Show Host (not given in 2005, 2016 and 2017)
- Best Educational Program Host (not given in 1998 and 2023)
- Best Lifestyle Show Host (since 2001)
- Best Morning Show Host (since 1999)
- Best Public Service Program Host (not given in 1998)
- Best Public Affairs Program Host
- Best Magazine Show Host
- Best Documentary Program Host
- Best Sports Show Host
- Best Reality Program Host (2004-2015 and 2025, except 2011-2012)
- Best Talent Search Program Host (since 2004) [or Best Talent Show Host since 1987 to early 1990s]
- Best Game Show Host (1988-2017 and 2025, except 1991, 1998 and 2012)
- Best Celebrity Talk Show Host
- Best Showbiz-Oriented Talk Show Host (1990-1999 and 2025)
- Best Male TV Host
- Best Female TV Host
- Best Male Newscaster
- Best Female Newscaster
- Best Comedy Actor
- Best Comedy Actress
- Best Drama Actor
- Best Drama Actress
- Best Drama Supporting Actor (Since 2013)
- Best Drama Supporting Actress (Since 2013)
- Best Child Performer (Since 2012)
- Best Single Performance by an Actor
- Best Single Performance by an Actress
- Best New TV Personality {a single category} (1987-1998, not given in 1988 which is "Most Promising TV Personality" a special award and 1989)
  - Best New Male TV Personality(1999 to present)
  - Best New Female TV Personality(1999 to present)

=== Merged Categories ===
- Best Educational & Children Program (2012)
- Best Reality & Game Show (2012)
- Best Lifestyle & Travel Show (2012 and 2025)
- Best Educational & Children Program Host (2012)
- Best Reality & Game Show Host (2012)
- Best Lifestyle & Travel Show Host (2012 and 2025)
- Best Variety & Game Show (2009–2010)
- Best Comedy & Gag Show (2012)
- Best Celebrity & Showbiz-Oriented Talk Show (2012)
- Best Musical & Variety Show (2012)
- Best Male Celebrity & Showbiz-Oriented Show Host (2012)
- Best Female Celebrity & Showbiz-Oriented Show Host (2012)

=== Best TV Station ===
- Winner of this category comes from the lists below:
  - ABS-CBN - 1992, 1995^, 1996, 1999, 2003, 2004, 2007, 2009, 2010, 2011, 2012, 2013^, 2014, 2015, 2016, 2017, 2018, 2019, 2020
  - GMA Network - 1987, 1988, 1989, 1990, 1991, 1993, 1994, 1995^, 1997, 1998, 2000, 2001, 2002, 2005, 2006, 2008, 2013^, 2021, 2023, 2024
- ABS-CBN awards lasted until 2020.

^ - In 1995 and 2013, ABS-CBN & GMA tied as Best TV Stations.

=== Special awards ===
- Male Face of the Night
- Female Face of the Night
- Male Star of the Night
- Female Star of the Night
- Male Celebrity of the Night
- Female Celebrity of the Night
- Ading Fernando Lifetime Achievement Award
- Excellence In Broadcasting Lifetime Achievement Award
- German Moreno's Power Tandem Award (2014 and 2025)

=== Hall of Fame ===
This will be given to a show and an artist (which is one category) that won their respective category, 15 times.

- 2009: Eat Bulaga! (Best Variety Show) (GMA Network formerly aired on RPN 9 & ABS-CBN)
- 2011: Boy Abunda (Best Male Showbiz-Oriented Show Host) (ABS-CBN)
- 2011: Maalaala Mo Kaya (Best Drama Anthology) (ABS-CBN)
- 2014: Bubble Gang (Best Gag Show) (GMA Network)
- 2018: ASAP (Best Musical Variety Show) (ABS-CBN)
- 2024: i-Witness (Best Documentary Program) (GMA Network)

Notes:

- Boy Abunda was awarded Hall of Famer for being "Best Male Showbiz-Oriented Show Host" in 2011, but he still nominated on his other categories which are "Best Celebrity Talk Show Host" and "Best Public Affairs Program Host" as of now.

=== Former or Inactive Categories ===
- Best Music Video (the only award went to Lupang Hinirang [PTV 4] for winning their Best Music Video in 1999)
- Best TV/Musical Special (until 2003 and replaced of Best Documentary Special in 2004)
- Best TV Station ID (the only award went to PTV 4 for winning their Best TV Station ID in 1996)
- Best TV Station w/ Balanced Programming (in 2000, it became and shortened as Best TV Station category)
- Best Movie Talk Show & Host (replaced by Best Showbiz-Oriented Show & Host in the early 90s)
- Best Woman Show & Host (in late 1980s to mid-19990s and also 2004 as "Best Woman-Oriented Program & Host")
- Best Cooking Show & Host (in early 1990s)
- Best Weekly Daytime Drama Series (in 2007, Love Spell [ABS-CBN 2]).
- Best Cultural Magazine Show & Host (in early 90s until replaced by "Best Travel Show & Host" & "Best Lifestyle Program & Host")
- Best Movie for TV (in early 90s to early 2000s)
- Best Musical Program & Host (in late 1980s to mid-1990s)
- Best Drama Serial & Best Drama Special (replaced of Best Drama Anthology since 1992)
- Best Youth-Oriented Program (1997 to 2014)
- Best Female Showbiz-Oriented Show Host (2000-2015, except 2012)
- Best Male Showbiz-Oriented Show Host (2000-2015, except 2012)
- Best Reality Program [or Best Reality Based Competition TV Program] (2004-2015, except 2011-2012)
- Best Gag Show (1990-2018, except 2012)
- Best Documentary Special (2004-2019, except 2006)

== See also ==
- Star Awards for Movies
- List of Asian television awards
- Golden Screen TV Awards
