= List of accolades received by Eat Bulaga! =

Eat Bulaga! accolades
Awards and nominations
Award	Wins	Nominations
Aliw Awards	1	3
Asian Television Awards	1	1
Box Office Entertainment Awards	21	21
FAMAS Awards	1	1
Gawad Tanglaw	3	3
Golden Screen TV Awards	11	21
PMPC Star Awards for Television	20	79

Totals (Note: Certain award groups do not simply award one winner. They acknowledge several different recipients, have runners-up, and have third place. Since this is a specific recognition and is different from losing an award, runner-up mentions are considered wins in this award tally. For simplification and to avoid errors, each award in this list has been presumed to have had a prior nomination.)
- Wins: 58
- Nominations: 129

Eat Bulaga! is a Philippine television variety show that premiered on Radio Philippines Network on July 30, 1979. The show features a disparate set of segments. It initially featured Tito Sotto, Vic Sotto, Joey de Leon, Chiqui Hollman, and Richie D'Horsie; the show's cast have changed significantly during its run.

Eat Bulaga! is the longest-running variety show in the Philippines. It has enjoyed consistently high viewership on broadcast television, according to AGB Nielsen Philippines and Kantar Media Philippines. The show's impact on television resulted in the creation of international spin-off programs and the supercouple nicknamed AlDub, which inspired various Internet memes, other mediums, and global popularity on social media.

Eat Bulaga! has garnered awards and nominations in various categories with particular recognition for its hosting and acting. It has won twenty-one Box Office Entertainment Awards. The show has received twenty-one Golden Screen TV Award nominations (winning eleven) and seventy-nine for PMPC Star Awards for Television (winning twenty). Eat Bulaga! won Best Entertainment (One-Off/Annual) at the 2005 Asian Television Awards. At the 2015 FAMAS Awards, Tito, Vic, and de Leon won FAMAS Lifetime Achievement Award.

== Accolades ==
Accolades received by Eat Bulaga!
Award	Year (Note: Indicates the year of ceremony. Each year is linked to the article about the awards held that year, wherever possible.)	Category	Recipient(s)	Result	Ref.
Aliw Awards	2008	Best Dance Company (Modern)	SexBomb Girls	Nominated	
Aliw Awards	2008	Best Dance Company (Modern)	EB Babes	Nominated	
Aliw Awards	2016	Best Stand-Up Comedian	Jose Manalo	Won	
Asian Television Awards	2005	Best Entertainment (One-Off/Annual)	Eat Bulaga! Silver Special	Won	
Box Office Entertainment Awards	2002	Most Popular Dance Group	SexBomb Dancers	Won	
Box Office Entertainment Awards	2005	Most Popular Dance Group	SexBomb Dancers	Won	
Box Office Entertainment Awards	2007	Hall of Fame	SexBomb Dancers	Inducted	
Box Office Entertainment Awards	2007	Most Popular Dance Group	EB Babes	Won	
Box Office Entertainment Awards	2008	Most Popular Dance Group	EB Babes	Won	
Box Office Entertainment Awards	2009	Most Popular Dance Group	EB Babes	Won	
Box Office Entertainment Awards	2012	Most Popular TV Program – Musical Variety/Noontime & Primetime	Eat Bulaga!	Won	
Box Office Entertainment Awards	2012	Bert Marcelo Lifetime Achievement Award	Jose Manalo and Wally Bayola	Won	
Box Office Entertainment Awards	2013	Most Popular TV Program – Musical Variety/Noontime & Primetime	Eat Bulaga!	Won	
Box Office Entertainment Awards	2014	Most Popular TV Program – Musical Variety/Noontime & Primetime	Eat Bulaga!	Won	
Box Office Entertainment Awards	2015	Most Popular TV Program – Musical Variety/Noontime & Primetime	Eat Bulaga!	Won	
Box Office Entertainment Awards	2015	Corazon Samaniego Lifetime Achievement Award	Vic Sotto	Won	
Box Office Entertainment Awards	2016	Most Popular TV Program – Musical Variety/Noontime & Primetime	Eat Bulaga!	Won	
Box Office Entertainment Awards	2016	Breakthrough Male Star of Philippine Movies and TV	Alden Richards	Won	
Box Office Entertainment Awards	2016	Breakthrough Female Star of Philippine Movies and TV	Maine Mendoza	Won	
Box Office Entertainment Awards	2016	Bert Marcelo Lifetime Achievement Award	Jose Manalo, Wally Bayola, and Paolo Ballesteros	Won	
Box Office Entertainment Awards	2016	Highest Record Rating of a Noontime Show of All Time (Local & Global)	"Tamang Panahon" for gaining a 55% television rating on October 24, 2015	Won	
Box Office Entertainment Awards	2017	Most Promising Recording/Performing Group	That's My Bae	Won	
Box Office Entertainment Awards	2017	Global Achievement by a Filipino Artist	Paolo Ballesteros	Won	
Box Office Entertainment Awards	2020	Male TV Host of the Year	Jose Manalo, Wally Bayola, and Paolo Ballesteros	Won	
Box Office Entertainment Awards	2024	Box Office Iconic Stars of Philippine Television	Tito Sotto, Vic Sotto, and Joey de Leon	Won	
FAMAS Awards	2015	FAMAS Lifetime Achievement Award	Tito Sotto, Vic Sotto, and Joey de Leon	Won	
Gawad Tanglaw	2011	Lifetime Achievement Award	Eat Bulaga!	Won	
Gawad Tanglaw	2016	Natatanging Tanglaw ng Kabataan sa Sining ng Telebisyon	Alden Richards and Maine Mendoza	Won	
Gawad Tanglaw	2016	Natatanging Gawad Tanglaw sa Sining ng Telebisyon	Antonio P. Tuviera	Won	
Golden Screen TV Awards	2011	Outstanding Variety Program	Eat Bulaga!	Won	
Golden Screen TV Awards	2011	Outstanding Male Host in a Musical or Variety Program	Vic Sotto	Won	
Golden Screen TV Awards	2011	Outstanding Male Host in a Musical or Variety Program	Tito Sotto	Nominated	
Golden Screen TV Awards	2011	Outstanding Male Host in a Musical or Variety Program	Joey de Leon	Nominated	
Golden Screen TV Awards	2011	Outstanding Female Host in a Musical or Variety Program	Julia Clarete	Won	
Golden Screen TV Awards	2011	Outstanding Female Host in a Musical or Variety Program	Pia Guanio	Nominated	
Golden Screen TV Awards	2013	Outstanding Variety Program	Eat Bulaga!	Won	
Golden Screen TV Awards	2013	Outstanding Male Host in a Musical or Variety Program	Ryan Agoncillo	Won	
Golden Screen TV Awards	2013	Outstanding Male Host in a Musical or Variety Program	Vic Sotto	Nominated	
Golden Screen TV Awards	2013	Outstanding Female Host in a Musical or Variety Program	Julia Clarete	Won	
Golden Screen TV Awards	2014	Outstanding Variety Program	Eat Bulaga!	Won	
Golden Screen TV Awards	2014	Outstanding Male Host in a Musical or Variety Program	Allan K.	Won	
Golden Screen TV Awards	2014	Outstanding Male Host in a Musical or Variety Program	Ryan Agoncillo	Nominated	
Golden Screen TV Awards	2014	Outstanding Female Host in a Musical or Program	Julia Clarete	Nominated	
Golden Screen TV Awards	2014	Outstanding Female Host in a Musical or Program	Pia Guanio	Nominated	
Golden Screen TV Awards	2014	Special Citation as the Youngest TV Host	Ryzza Mae Dizon	Won	
Golden Screen TV Awards	2015	Outstanding Variety Program	Eat Bulaga!	Won	
Golden Screen TV Awards	2015	Outstanding Female Host for a Musical or Variety Program	Julia Clarete	Won	
Golden Screen TV Awards	2015	Outstanding Female Host for a Musical or Variety Program	Pia Guanio	Nominated	
Golden Screen TV Awards	2015	Outstanding Male Host for a Musical or Variety Program	Allan K.	Nominated	
Golden Screen TV Awards	2015	Outstanding Male Host for a Musical or Variety Program	Ryan Agoncillo	Nominated	
PMPC Star Awards for Television	1996	Best Variety Show	Eat Bulaga!	Won	
PMPC Star Awards for Television	2000	Best Variety Show	Eat Bulaga!	Won	
PMPC Star Awards for Television	2000	Ading Fernando Lifetime Achievement Award	Tito Sotto, Vic Sotto, and Joey de Leon	Won	
PMPC Star Awards for Television	2005	Best Variety Show	Eat Bulaga!	Won	
PMPC Star Awards for Television	2005	Best Male TV Host	Vic Sotto	Nominated	
PMPC Star Awards for Television	2006	Best Variety Show	Eat Bulaga!	Won	
PMPC Star Awards for Television	2007	Best Variety Show	Eat Bulaga!	Won	
PMPC Star Awards for Television	2007	Best Male TV Host	Vic Sotto	Nominated	
PMPC Star Awards for Television	2007	Best Male TV Host	Joey de Leon	Nominated	
PMPC Star Awards for Television	2007	Best Female TV Host	Pia Guanio	Nominated	
PMPC Star Awards for Television	2008	Best Variety Show	Eat Bulaga!	Won (Note: Tied with Wowowee)	
PMPC Star Awards for Television	2008	Best Male TV Host	Vic Sotto	Won	
PMPC Star Awards for Television	2008	Best Female TV Host	Pia Guanio	Nominated	
PMPC Star Awards for Television	2008	Best New Female TV Personality	Daiana Menezes	Nominated	
PMPC Star Awards for Television	2009	Hall of Fame (Best Variety Show)	Eat Bulaga!	Inducted	
PMPC Star Awards for Television	2009	Best Male TV Host	Vic Sotto	Nominated	
PMPC Star Awards for Television	2009	Best Male TV Host	Allan K.	Nominated	
PMPC Star Awards for Television	2009	Best Female TV Host	Julia Clarete	Nominated	
PMPC Star Awards for Television	2009	Best Female TV Host	Pia Guanio	Nominated	
PMPC Star Awards for Television	2010	Best Male TV Host	Vic Sotto	Nominated	
PMPC Star Awards for Television	2010	Best Male TV Host	Joey de Leon	Won	
PMPC Star Awards for Television	2010	Best Male TV Host	Allan K.	Nominated	
PMPC Star Awards for Television	2010	Best Female TV Host	Pia Guanio	Nominated	
PMPC Star Awards for Television	2010	Ading Fernando Lifetime Achievement Award	Antonio P. Tuviera	Won	
PMPC Star Awards for Television	2011	Best Male TV Host	Allan K.	Won	
PMPC Star Awards for Television	2011	Best Male TV Host	Vic Sotto	Nominated	
PMPC Star Awards for Television	2011	Best Male TV Host	Joey de Leon	Nominated	
PMPC Star Awards for Television	2012	Best Male TV Host	Vic Sotto	Nominated	
PMPC Star Awards for Television	2012	Best Male TV Host	Allan K.	Nominated	
PMPC Star Awards for Television	2012	Best Male TV Host	Ryan Agoncillo	Nominated	
PMPC Star Awards for Television	2012	Best Female TV Host	Julia Clarete	Nominated	
PMPC Star Awards for Television	2012	Best Female TV Host	Pauleen Luna	Nominated	
PMPC Star Awards for Television	2012	Best New Female TV Personality	Ryzza Mae Dizon	Nominated	
PMPC Star Awards for Television	2012	Best New Female TV Personality	Isabelle Daza	Nominated	
PMPC Star Awards for Television	2013	Best Male TV Host	Vic Sotto	Nominated	
PMPC Star Awards for Television	2013	Best Male TV Host	Allan K.	Nominated	
PMPC Star Awards for Television	2013	Best Female TV Host	Julia Clarete	Nominated	
PMPC Star Awards for Television	2013	Best Female TV Host	Pauleen Luna	Nominated	
PMPC Star Awards for Television	2014	Best Male TV Host	Vic Sotto	Nominated	
PMPC Star Awards for Television	2014	Best Male TV Host	Joey de Leon	Nominated	
PMPC Star Awards for Television	2014	Best Female TV Host	Julia Clarete	Nominated	
PMPC Star Awards for Television	2014	Best Female TV Host	Pia Guanio	Nominated	
PMPC Star Awards for Television	2014	Best Single Performance by an Actor	Jose Manalo for "Hulog ng Langit" (2014 Eat Bulaga! Lenten Special)	Won (Note: Tied with Arjo Atayde for the "Dos Por Dos" episode of Maalaala Mo Kaya (2014))	
PMPC Star Awards for Television	2015	Best Male TV Host	Wally Bayola	Nominated	
PMPC Star Awards for Television	2015	Best Female TV Host	Julia Clarete	Nominated	
PMPC Star Awards for Television	2015	Best Female TV Host	Pia Guanio	Nominated	
PMPC Star Awards for Television	2015	Best New Female TV Personality	Maine Mendoza	Nominated	
PMPC Star Awards for Television	2015	German Moreno's Power Tandem Award	Alden Richards and Maine Mendoza	Won	
PMPC Star Awards for Television	2016	Best Male TV Host	Vic Sotto	Nominated	
PMPC Star Awards for Television	2016	Best Male TV Host	Ryan Agoncillo	Nominated	
PMPC Star Awards for Television	2016	Best Female TV Host	Pia Guanio	Nominated	
PMPC Star Awards for Television	2016	Best Single Performance by an Actor	Alden Richards for "God Gave Me You" (2016 Eat Bulaga! Lenten Special)	Nominated	
PMPC Star Awards for Television	2016	Best New Male TV Personality	Sebastian Benedict	Nominated	
PMPC Star Awards for Television	2016	Best New Male TV Personality	Jake Ejercito for "God Gave Me You" (2016 Eat Bulaga! Lenten Special)	Won (Note: Tied with Onyok Pineda for Ang Probinsyano (2015–2022))	
PMPC Star Awards for Television	2017	Best Male TV Host	Ryan Agoncillo	Nominated	
PMPC Star Awards for Television	2017	Best Male TV Host	Allan K.	Nominated	
PMPC Star Awards for Television	2017	Best Male TV Host	Jose Manalo	Nominated	
PMPC Star Awards for Television	2017	Best Male TV Host	Alden Richards	Nominated	
PMPC Star Awards for Television	2017	Best Male TV Host	Vic Sotto	Nominated	
PMPC Star Awards for Television	2017	Best Female TV Host	Pia Guanio	Nominated	
PMPC Star Awards for Television	2017	Best Female TV Host	Maine Mendoza	Nominated	
PMPC Star Awards for Television	2017	Best Single Performance by an Actor	Alden Richards for "Kapatid" (2017 Eat Bulaga! Lenten Special)	Won (Note: Tied with John Estrada for the "Mansanas at Juice" episode of Maalaala Mo Kaya (2017))	
PMPC Star Awards for Television	2017	Ading Fernando Lifetime Achievement Award	Vic Sotto	Won	
PMPC Star Awards for Television	2018	Best Male TV Host	Alden Richards	Won	
PMPC Star Awards for Television	2018	Best Male TV Host	Vic Sotto	Nominated	
PMPC Star Awards for Television	2018	Best Female TV Host	Maine Mendoza	Won	
PMPC Star Awards for Television	2018	Best New Male TV Personality	Kendoll	Won	
PMPC Star Awards for Television	2019	Best Male TV Host	Vic Sotto	Nominated	
PMPC Star Awards for Television	2019	Best Female TV Host	Pia Guanio	Nominated	
PMPC Star Awards for Television	2019	Best Female TV Host	Maine Mendoza	Nominated	
PMPC Star Awards for Television	2019	Best Single Performance by an Actor	Wally Bayola for "Bulawan" (2019 Eat Bulaga! Lenten Special)	Nominated	
PMPC Star Awards for Television	2019	Best Single Performance by an Actor	Alden Richards for "Bulawan" (2019 Eat Bulaga! Lenten Special)	Nominated	
PMPC Star Awards for Television	2021	Best Male TV Host	Paolo Ballesteros	Nominated	
PMPC Star Awards for Television	2021	Best Male TV Host	Alden Richards	Nominated	
PMPC Star Awards for Television	2021	Best Male TV Host	Vic Sotto	Nominated	
PMPC Star Awards for Television	2021	Best Female TV Host	Pia Guanio	Nominated	
PMPC Star Awards for Television	2021	Best Female TV Host	Maine Mendoza	Nominated	
PMPC Star Awards for Television	2023	Best Male TV Host	Paolo Ballesteros	Won	
PMPC Star Awards for Television	2023	Best Male TV Host	Alden Richards	Nominated	
PMPC Star Awards for Television	2023	Best Female TV Host	Maine Mendoza	Nominated	
