= 1990 in Philippine television =

The following is a list of events effecting Philippine television in 1990. Events listed include television show debuts, finales, cancellations, and channel launches, closures and rebrandings, as well as information about controversies and carriage disputes.

== Events ==
- March 1 - GMA marks 40 years of broadcasts. The network introduced a rainbow insignia placed below its existing logo, which led its new identity as "The Rainbow Network".
- September 22 – Tito, Vic & Joey celebrated the 11th Anniversary of Eat Bulaga!

== Premieres ==
Date	Show
January 1	Open Sesame on ABS-CBN 2
January 5	ABS-CBN Special News Report on ABS-CBN 2
February 4	That's Incredible! on IBC 13
February 12	Ula, Ang Batang Gubat on IBC 13
February 18	ALF on New Vision 9
February 18	Perfect Strangers on New Vision 9
February 22	Hotline sa Trece on IBC 13
February 23	Last Two Minutes on PTV 4
February 23	Sa Direksyon ni Lino Brocka on PTV 4
February 26	Candid Camera on New Vision 9
March 15	Buddy en Sol on New Vision 9
April 4	Magnum, P.I. on GMA 7
May 21	Junior Patrol on ABS-CBN 2
May 22	Gabi ni Dolphy on New Vision 9
June 2	Star Trek: The Next Generation on New Vision 9
June 4	Jeopardy! on New Vision 9
June 17	Chairman of the Board and Company on IBC 13
July 10	The Inside Story on ABS-CBN 2
July 19	Starzan on New Vision 9
July 19	Manilyn Live! on New Vision 9
October 1	The 11 O'Clock News on Islands TV 13
October 1	Business Today on GMA 7
October 7	Love Me Doods on PTV 4
November 3	Tatak Pilipino on ABS-CBN 2

=== Unknown Date ===
- October:
  - Estudyante Blues on PTV 4
  - Viva Drama Specials on PTV 4

=== Unknown ===
- Mag-Asawa'y Di Biro on New Vision 9
- Small Brothers on ABS-CBN 2
- It Bulingit on ABS-CBN 2
- Luv Ko si Kris on ABS-CBN 2
- Wala Kang Paki on ABS-CBN 2
- Ang Iglesia ni Cristo on ABS-CBN 2
- Agring-Agri on IBC 13
- Look Up with Evelyn Atayde on IBC 13
- Mag Agri Tayo on IBC 13
- Morning Brew on IBC 13
- Kalusugan ay Kayamanan on IBC 13
- Mahal on IBC 13
- Usap-Usapan Live on IBC 13
- 24 Oras on IBC 13
- Ginintuang Telon on IBC 13
- S.A.G.A.D. on IBC 13
- Seiko TV Presents on IBC 13
- Computerman on IBC 13
- Ang Manok ni San Pedro on IBC 13
- Mongolian Barbecue on IBC 13
- Takeshi's Castle on IBC 13
- Awitawanan on IBC 13
- Saturday Nite Live on IBC 13
- Ang Iglesia ni Cristo on IBC 13
- Concert at the Park on GMA 7
- The Penthouse Party on GMA 7
- Pandakekoks on GMA 7
- Profiles of Power on GMA 7
- Negosiete: Mag-Aral sa GMA on GMA 7
- Chikiting Patrol on GMA 7
- Yan ang Bata on GMA 7
- Beauty School with Ricky Reyes on New Vision 9
- Boracay on New Vision 9
- Gabi ni Dolphy on New Vision 9
- Hoy! on New Vision 9
- Kami Naman! on New Vision 9
- Pedya: TV Day Care on New Vision 9
- Rhapsody on New Vision 9
- Tanglaw ng Buhay on New Vision 9
- T.S.U.P on New Vision 9
- Kadenang Rosas on PTV 4
- Midnight Session on PTV 4
- Pagcor Jai-Alai on PTV 4
- Pin Pin on PTV 4
- Usapang Kongreso on PTV 4
- Juspion on GMA 7
- Yamara! A Fashionable Judo Girl on GMA 7
- Spielban on IBC 13
- Metalders on ABS-CBN 2

== Returning or renamed programs ==
Show	Last aired	Retitled as/Season/Notes	Channel	Return date
Philippine Basketball Association	1989 (season 15: "Reinforced Conference")	Same (season 16: "First Conference")	PTV	February 18
Philippine Basketball League	1989 (season 7: "Maharlika Cup")	Same (season 8: "Maharlika Cup")	PTV	March 31
Philippine Basketball League	1990 (season 8: "Maharlika Cup")	Same (season 8: "Challenge Cup")	PTV	May 27
Philippine Basketball Association	1990 (season 16: "First Conference")	Same (season 16: "All-Filipino Conference")	PTV	June 10
University Athletic Association of the Philippines	1990	Same (season 53)	New Vision 9	July 28
National Collegiate Athletic Association	1990	Same (season 66)	PTV	August 5
Philippine Basketball Association	1990 (season 16: "All-Filipino Conference")	Same (season 16: "Third Conference")	PTV	September 30
Philippine Basketball League	1990 (season 8: "Challenge Cup")	Same (season 8: "Philippine Cup")	PTV	October
National Basketball Association	1990	Same (1990–91 season)	GMA	November

== Programs transferring networks ==
Date	Show	No. of seasons	Moved from	Moved to
June 10	Chikiting Patrol	—N/a	IBC (now Islands TV 13)	GMA
Unknown	Ang Iglesia ni Cristo	—N/a	New Vision 9	ABS-CBN / IBC (now Islands TV 13)
Unknown	Concert at the Park	—N/a	PTV	GMA
Unknown	Beauty School with Ricky Reyes	—N/a	IBC (now Islands TV 13)	New Vision 9
Unknown	Seiko TV Presents	—N/a	ABS-CBN	IBC (now Islands TV 13)

== Finales ==
- February 9: El Corazon de Oro on IBC 13
- February 15: Ang Boyfriend Kong Mamaw (E.T. Pala) on IBC 13
- February 17: Unsolved Mysteries on New Vision 9
- February 19: Face the Music on New Vision 9
- March 15: Princess on GMA 7
- March 19: John en Marsha on New Vision 9
- March 28: Sable on GMA 7
- June 3: Chikiting Patrol on IBC 13
- June 9: Student Canteen on New Vision 9
- July 3: PEP (People, Events and Places) Talk on ABS-CBN 2
- June 29: Last Two Minites on PTV 4
- July 13: Sa Direksyon ni Lino Brocka on PTV 4
- September 15: Sic O'Clock News on IBC 13
- September 28: Bantay Balita on IBC 13

=== Unknown ===
- Concert at the Park on PTV 4
- ABS-CBN International Report on ABS-CBN 2
- Seiko TV Presents on ABS-CBN 2
- Ellas A.D. on ABS-CBN 2
- Wala Kang Paki on ABS-CBN 2
- Cafe Bravo on ABS-CBN 2
- Cooking Atbp on ABS-CBN 2
- Look Up with Evelyn Atayde on IBC 13
- Mag Agri Tayo on IBC 13
- Public Forum on IBC 13
- Kalusugan ay Kayamanan on IBC 13
- Ora Engkantada on IBC 13
- 13, 14, 15 on IBC 13
- Ayos Lang, Tsong! on IBC 13
- Pinoy TV Komiks on IBC 13
- Ginintuang Telon on IBC 13
- Makulay na Daigdig ni Nora on IBC 13
- Regal Juvenile on IBC 13
- S.A.G.A.D. on IBC 13
- Takeshi's Castle on IBC 13
- Loveliness on IBC 13
- Regal Family on IBC 13
- Saturday Nite Live on IBC 13
- Superstar: The Legend on IBC 13
- Beauty School with Ricky Reyes on IBC 13
- Pinoy Wrestling on IBC 13
- Spectacular Action on Screen on IBC 13
- Sunday Night Special on IBC 13
- Regal Romance on GMA 7
- Pabuenas sa Siete on GMA 7
- Velez This Week on GMA 7
- Embassy Features on GMA 7
- Issues and Answers on GMA 7
- Bulilit on GMA 7
- John Osteen on GMA 7
- Blotter on New Vision 9
- Boracay on New Vision 9
- Correctionals on New Vision 9
- Gabi ni Dolphy on New Vision 9
- Kami Naman! on New Vision 9
- NewsWatch International on New Vision 9
- Pedya: TV Day Care on New Vision 9
- Rhapsody on New Vision 9
- T.S.U.P on New Vision 9
- Ang Iglesia ni Cristo on New Vision 9
- People's Privilege Hour on PTV 4
- Start of Something Big on PTV 4
- Sharivan on IBC 13
- Voltes V on IBC 13
- Spielban on ABS-CBN 2

== Births ==
- January 1 - Bugoy Drilon, actor and singer
- January 9 – Melissa Ricks, actress
- January 14 – Mikee Lee, actor and dancer
- February 13 - Raphael Martinez, actor
- February 27 – Megan Young, Filipino-American actress and Miss World 2013 winner
- March 15 – Naomi Tiburcio, broadcast journalist
- March 24 – Aljur Abrenica, Filipino actor
- March 26 - Matteo Guidicelli, actor and singer and TV Host
- March 30 - Benjamin de Guzman, actor, dancer, TV Host
- April 11, Martin Escudero, actor
- April 19 –
  - Kim Chiu, Filipina actress
  - Gretchen Ho, TV personality, athlete
- April 27 – Jackie Rice, Filipino-American actress
- May 4 – Andrea Torres, Filipina TV/film actress and commercial model
- May 12 - Sherwin Baguion, actor and singer
- May 17 - Ronabelle Veneracion, actress and TV Host
- May 28 - Josef Elizalde, actor and TV Host
- May 31 – Justine Peña, Host of O Shopping
- June 22 – Ani Pearl Alonzo
- June 25 – Andi Eigenmann, Filipina actress
- June 29 - Jewel Mische, actress and TV Host
- June 30 - Nelsito Nel Gomez, actor, dancer and TV Host
- July 8 - Olyn Meimban, actress and TV Host
- July 10 – Hajji Kaamiño, broadcaster
- July 20 – Dominic Roque (Born Dominic Karl Manalo Roque), actor and model
- August 10 – Gwen Zamora, Filipina-Italian actress
- August 18 - Nicole Uysiuseng, actress and TV Host
- August 19 – Debbie Gracia, actress and commercial model
- August 30 – Sophie Albert, Filipina actress
- September 20 – Erich Gonzales, Filipina actress
- September 27 – Charee Pineda, Filipino-American actress
- September 29 – Gerphil Flores, Filipina classical singer
- October 3 – Rhian Ramos, Filipina actress
- October 18 - Beatrice Candaza, actress, model, & TV Host
- October 22 - Angel Movido, news reporter, former host, former radio DJ and former news anchor
- November 16 – Arjo Atayde, actor
- December 10 - Ronan Nan Cleunar, actor and TV Host
- December 21 - Sam Mangubat, singer and songwriter

== See also ==
- 1990 in television
