= 5th PMPC Star Awards for Television =

- Date: October 26, 1991
- Location: Metropolitan Theater, Manila
- Hosted by: Vilma Santos; Eric Quizon; Vic Sotto; Mari Kaimo

Television/radio coverage
- Network: IBC
- Produced by: Airtime Marketing Philippines, Inc.

The 5th PMPC Star Awards for Television were held at the Metropolitan Theater in Manila on October 26, 1991, and broadcast on IBC Channel 13. The awards night was hosted by Vilma Santos, Eric Quizon, Vic Sotto, Mari Kaimo and to be directed by Al Quinn. The theme of the awards night is Magkatapat pero Magkaibigan (Opposite but Confirm) as it marks the 25th anniversary of PMPC.

== Nominees ==
These are the nominations for the 5th Star Awards for Television. The winners will be in bold and in the top of the list.

Network	Total # of Nominees
ABS-CBN	64
PTV	17
GMA	53
RPN	19
IBC	19

Network	Total # of Winners (excluding Special Awards)
ABS-CBN	7
GMA	18
RPN	8
IBC	3

=== Best Station with Balanced Programming ===
- ABS-CBN 2
- PTV 4
- **GMA 7**
- RPN 9
- IBC 13

=== Best Drama Series ===
- **Agila (ABS-CBN 2)**
- Balintataw (PTV 4)
- Coney Reyes on Camera (ABS-CBN 2)
- Dear Teacher (IBC 13)
- Ipaglaban Mo! (IBC 13)
- Lovingly Yours, Helen (GMA 7)
- Viva Spotlight (GMA 7)

=== Best Drama Special ===
- Ang Biktima ng Ligaw na Sandali (IBC 13)
- Ang Pinakamagandang Parol (IBC 13)
- Bilanggo (IBC 13)
- **Once There Was a Love (GMA 7)**

=== Best Drama Actress ===
- Dina Bonnevie (Boracay / RPN 9)
- Suzanne Gonzales (Anna Luna / ABS-CBN 2)
- Aiko Melendez (Regal Presents / ABS-CBN 2)
- **Coney Reyes (Coney Reyes on Camera / ABS-CBN 2)**
- Snooky Serna (Regal Golden Hour / ABS-CBN 2)
- Aurora Sevilla (Agila / ABS-CBN 2)
- Maricel Soriano (Maricel Soriano Drama Special / ABS-CBN 2)

=== Best Drama Actor ===
- Ricky Belmonte (Anna Luna / ABS-CBN 2)
- Keempee de Leon (Agila / ABS-CBN 2)
- Orestes Ojeda (Agila / ABS-CBN 2)
- Sonny Parsons (Agila / ABS-CBN 2)
- Ronnie Quizon (Agila / ABS-CBN 2)
- Val Sotto (Agila / ABS-CBN 2)
- **Joel Torre (Boracay / RPN 9)**

=== Best New TV Personality ===
- Tweety de Leon (Okay Ka Fairy Ko / ABS-CBN 2)
- **Christine Jacob (Eat Bulaga / ABS-CBN 2)**
- Jennifer Pingree (Buddy en Sol / RPN 9)
- James Presley (It Bulinggit / ABS-CBN 2)
- Gel Santos-Relos (Tatak Pilipino / ABS-CBN 2)
- Meryl Soriano (Buddy en Sol / RPN 9)

=== Best Gag Show ===
- Goin' Bananas (ABS-CBN 2)
- **Mongolian Barbecue (IBC 13)**
- TVJ (IBC 13)

=== Best Comedy Show ===
- **Abangan Ang Susunod Na Kabanata (ABS-CBN 2)**
- Buddy en Sol (RPN 9)
- Family 3+1 (GMA 7)
- It Bulinggit (ABS-CBN 2)
- Mag-Asawa'y Di Biro (RPN 9)
- Okay Ka Fairy Ko (ABS-CBN 2)

=== Best Comedy Actor ===
- Roderick Paulate (Abangan Ang Susunod Na Kabanata / ABS-CBN 2)
- Vic Sotto (Okay Ka Fairy Ko / ABS-CBN 2)
- Jun Urbano (It Bulinggit / ABS-CBN 2)
- **Redford White (Buddy en Sol / RPN 9)**
- Anjo Yllana (Abangan Ang Susunod Na Kabanata / ABS-CBN 2)

=== Best Comedy Actress ===
- Ruby Rodriguez (Okay Ka Fairy Ko / ABS-CBN 2)
- Gloria Romero (Palibhasa Lalake / ABS-CBN 2)
- Charito Solis (Okay Ka Fairy Ko / ABS-CBN 2)
- Tessie Tomas (Abangan Ang Susunod Na Kabanata / ABS-CBN 2)
- **Nova Villa (Abangan Ang Susunod Na Kabanata / ABS-CBN 2)**

=== Best Musical Variety Show ===
- Awitawanan (IBC 13)
- Manilyn Live (RPN 9)
- The Sharon Cuneta Show (ABS-CBN 2)
- Tonight with Dick and Carmi (ABS-CBN 2)
- **Vilma! (GMA 7)**

=== Best Variety Show ===
- Eat Bulaga! (ABS-CBN 2)
- **GMA Supershow (GMA 7)**
- Lunch Date (GMA 7)
- Sa Linggo nAPO Sila (ABS-CBN 2)
- Saturday Entertainment (GMA 7)
- That's Entertainment (GMA 7)

=== Best Female TV Host ===
- Sharon Cuneta (The Sharon Cuneta Show / ABS-CBN 2)
- Rio Diaz (Eat Bulaga / ABS-CBN 2)
- **Tina Revilla (Lunch Date / GMA 7)**
- Vilma Santos (Vilma / GMA 7)

=== Best Male TV Host ===
- Herbert Bautista (The Sharon Cuneta Show / ABS-CBN 2)
- Boboy Garovillo (Sa Linggo nAPO Sila / ABS-CBN 2)
- **German Moreno (GMA Supershow / GMA 7)**
- Roderick Paulate (Tonight with Dick and Carmi / ABS-CBN 2)
- Randy Santiago (Lunch Date / GMA 7)

=== Best Musical Program ===
- **A Little Night of Music (GMA 7)**
- Chairman of the Board (IBC 13)
- Concert at the Park (GMA 7)
- Paco Park Presents (PTV 4)
- Ryan Ryan Musikahan (ABS-CBN 2)

=== Best Musical Program Host ===
- **Fides Asencio and John Lesaca (A Little Night of Music / GMA 7)**
- Ryan Cayabyab (Ryan Ryan Musikahan / ABS-CBN 2)
- Bobby Ledesma, Eddie Mercado and Bert Nievera (Chairman of the Board / IBC 13)
- Tina Monzon-Palma (Concert at the Park / GMA 7)
- Josephine Roces (Paco Park Presents / PTV 4)

=== Best Musical Special ===
- 100 Stars on Christmas (IBC 13)
- Christmas in Our Hearts (RPN 9)
- **Tribute to No. 1 (GMA 7)**

=== Best Public Service Program ===
- Bahay Kalinga (ABS-CBN 2)
- Damayan (PTV 4)
- **Hotline sa Trese (IBC 13)**
- Kapwa Ko Mahal Ko (GMA 7)

=== Best Public Service Program Host ===
- Cielito del Mundo and Nonoy Zuñiga (Kapwa Ko Mahal Ko / GMA 7)
- **Joseph Estrada and Cory Quirino (Hotline sa Trese / IBC 13)**
- Frankie Evangelista and Vicky Garchitorenza (Bahay Kalinga / ABS-CBN 2)
- Rosa Rosal (Damayan / PTV 4)

=== Best Educational Program ===
- Ating Alamin (PTV 4)
- **Beauty School On the Air (RPN 9)**
- Negosiyete (GMA 7)
- Telearalan ng Kakayahan (PTV 4)

=== Best Educational Program Host ===
- Cecille Garrucho (Telearalan ng Kakayahan / PTV 4)
- Gerry Geronimo (Ating Alamin / PTV 4)
- German Moreno (Negosiyete / GMA 7)
- **Ricky Reyes (Beauty School On the Air / RPN 9)**

=== Best Celebrity Talk Show ===
- **Martin After Dark (GMA 7)**
- Mel & Jay (ABS-CBN 2)
- Oh No, It's Johnny! (ABS-CBN 2)

=== Best Celebrity Talk Show Host ===
- Johnny Litton (Oh No, It's Johnny! / ABS-CBN 2)
- **Martin Nievera (Martin After Dark / GMA 7)**
- Jay Sonza and Mel Tiangco (Mel & Jay / ABS-CBN 2)

=== Best Magazine Show ===
- **The Inside Story (ABS-CBN 2)**
- Magandang Gabi, Bayan (ABS-CBN 2)
- Magandang Umaga Po (ABS-CBN 2)
- **The Probe Team (GMA 7)**

=== Best Magazine Show Host ===
- Noli de Castro (Magandang Gabi, Bayan / ABS-CBN 2)
- **Cheche Lazaro (The Probe Team / GMA 7)**
- Loren Legarda (The Inside Story / ABS-CBN 2)
- Korina Sanchez (Magandang Umaga Po / ABS-CBN 2)

=== Best Cultural Magazine Show ===
- For Arts Sake (PTV 4)
- Pinoy, Eh (IBC 13)
- **Tatak Pilipino (ABS-CBN 2)**
- Travel Time (GMA 7)

=== Best Cultural Magazine Show Host ===
- Susan Africa (For Arts Sake / PTV 4)
- Susan Calo-Medina (Travel Time / GMA 7)
- **Jim Paredes and Gel Santos-Relos (Tatak Pilipino / ABS-CBN 2)**
- Ces Quesada (Pinoy, Eh / IBC 13)

=== Best News Program ===
- Balita Ala-Una (PTV 4)
- **GMA Balita (GMA 7)**
- GMA Headline News (GMA 7)
- Headline 13 (IBC 13)
- NewsWatch Prime Cast (RPN 9)
- TV Patrol (ABS-CBN 2)
- The World Tonight (ABS-CBN 2)

=== Best Male Newscaster ===
- Angelo Castro, Jr. (The World Tonight / ABS-CBN 2)
- Noli de Castro (TV Patrol / ABS-CBN 2)
- Bobby Guanzon (GMA Balita / GMA 7)
- Mari Kaimo (News on 4 / PTV 4)
- TG Kintanar (Headline 13 / IBC 13)
- Flor Perez (Balita Ala-Una / PTV 4)
- **Jose Mari Velez/Leslie Espino (GMA Headline News / GMA 7)**

=== Best Female Newscaster ===
- Lee Andres (Balita Ala-Una / PTV 4)
- Loren Legarda (The World Tonight / ABS-CBN 2)
- Dada Lorenzana (Pangunahing Balita / PTV 4)
- Coco Quisumbing (NewsWatch Prime Cast / RPN 9)
- Korina Sanchez (TV Patrol / ABS-CBN 2)
- Cathy Santillan (NewsWatch Prime Cast / RPN 9)
- **Helen Vela (GMA Balita / GMA 7)**

=== Best Public Affairs Program ===
- Straight from the Shoulder (GMA 7)
- **Tell the People (RPN 9)**
- Velez This Week (GMA 7)
- Viewpoint (GMA 7)

=== Best Public Affairs Program Host ===
- Louie Beltran (Straight from the Shoulder / GMA 7)
- Dong Puno (Viewpoint / GMA 7)
- Jose Mari Velez (Velez This Week / GMA 7)
- **Julie Yap-Daza (Tell the People / RPN 9)**

=== Best Showbiz Oriented Program ===
- Eye to Eye (GMA 7)
- Face to Face (GMA 7)
- **Movie Magazine (GMA 7)**
- Sine Silip (IBC 13)

=== Best Showbiz Oriented Program Host ===
- Inday Badiday (Eye to Eye / GMA 7)
- **Inday Badiday (Face to Face / GMA 7)**
- Letty Celli, Julie Fe Navarro and Oskee Salazar (Sine Silip / IBC 13)
- Cristy Fermin, Nap Gutierrez and Lulubelle Lam (Movie Magazine / GMA 7)

=== Best Children Show ===
- Batibot (ABS-CBN 2)
- Bulilit (GMA 7)
- Chikiting Patrol (GMA 7)
- **Penpen de Sarapen (RPN 9)**
- Pin-Pin (PTV 4)
- Star Smile Factory (ABS-CBN 2)
- '**Yan Ang Bata (GMA 7)**

=== Best Children Show Host ===
- **Connie Angeles (Penpen de Sarapen / RPN 9)**
- Encar Benedicto ('Yan Ang Bata / GMA 7)
- **Caselyn Francisco ('Yan Ang Bata / GMA 7)**
- Subas Herrero (Star Smile Factory / ABS-CBN 2)
- Shakesphere Ngo (Chikiting Patrol / GMA 7)
- Shakesphere Ngo (Pin-Pin / PTV 4)
- Sienna Olaso (Batibot / ABS-CBN 2)
- Bodjie Pascua (Bulilit / GMA 7)

== Special awards ==
=== Vic Silayan Memorial Award ===
- Robert Arevalo

=== Ading Fernando Lifetime Achievement Award ===
- Armida Siguion-Reyna (Aawitan Kita / RPN 9)

=== Star Awards for Broadcasting Excellence ===
- Bobby Guanzon

=== Glamorous Stars of the Night ===
- Eric Quizon (Male)
- Vilma Santos (Female)

== See also ==
- PMPC Star Awards for TV
