= PMPC Star Award for Best Magazine Show =

The Philippine Movie Press Club (PMPC) Star Award for Best Magazine Show is given to the best television magazine program of the year and also magazine show hosts.

== Winners ==
=== Best Magazine Show ===
- 1987: Isip Pinoy (RPN 9)
- 1988:
- 1989: Travel Time (IBC 13)
- 1990:
- 1991: The Inside Story (ABS-CBN 2) & The Probe Team (GMA 7) [tied]
- 1992: The Probe Team (GMA 7)
- 1993: The Inside Story (ABS-CBN 2)
- 1994: The Probe Team (GMA 7)
- 1995:
- 1996:
- 1997:
- 1998: The Probe Team (GMA 7)
- 1999:
- 2000: The Probe Team (GMA 7)
- 2001: The Probe Team (GMA 7)
- 2002: Jessica Soho Reports (GMA 7)
- 2003: The Correspondents (ABS-CBN 2)
- 2004: Kontrobersyal (ABS-CBN 2)
- 2005: Rated K (ABS-CBN 2)
- 2006: Rated K (ABS-CBN 2)
- 2007: Rated K (ABS-CBN 2)
- 2008: Rated K (ABS-CBN 2)
- 2009: Kapuso Mo, Jessica Soho (GMA 7)
- 2010: Kapuso Mo, Jessica Soho (GMA 7)
- 2011: Rated K (ABS-CBN 2)
- 2012: Kapuso Mo, Jessica Soho (GMA 7)
- 2013: I Juander (GMA News TV)
- 2014: I Juander (GMA News TV)
- 2015: Rated K (ABS-CBN 2)
- 2016: Rated K (ABS-CBN 2)
- 2017: Kapuso Mo, Jessica Soho (GMA 7)
- 2018: Kapuso Mo, Jessica Soho (GMA 7)
- 2019: Rated K (ABS-CBN 2)
- 2020: Kapuso Mo, Jessica Soho (GMA 7)
- 2021: Kapuso Mo, Jessica Soho (GMA 7)
- 2023: Kapuso Mo, Jessica Soho (GMA 7)
- 2024: Kapuso Mo, Jessica Soho (GMA 7)

=== Best Magazine Show Hosts ===
- 1987: Loren Legarda (PEP Talk / ABS-CBN 2)
- 1988:
- 1989: Susan Calo-Medina (Travel Time / IBC 13)
- 1990:
- 1991: Cheche Lazaro (The Probe Team / GMA 7)
- 1992: Loren Legarda (The Inside Story / ABS-CBN 2)
- 1993: Loren Legarda (The Inside Story / ABS-CBN 2)
- 1994:
- 1995:
- 1996:
- 1997:
- 1998: Cheche Lazaro (The Probe Team / GMA 7)
- 1999:
- 2000: Cheche Lazaro (The Probe Team / GMA 7)
- 2001: Cheche Lazaro (The Probe Team / GMA 7)
- 2002: Jessica Soho (Jessica Soho Reports / GMA 7)
- 2003: Karen Davila (The Correspondents / ABS-CBN 2)
- 2004: Boy Abunda (Kontrobersyal / ABS-CBN 2)
- 2005: Korina Sanchez (Rated K / ABS-CBN 2)
- 2006: Korina Sanchez (Rated K / ABS-CBN 2)
- 2007: Korina Sanchez (Rated K / ABS-CBN 2)
- 2008: Korina Sanchez (Rated K / ABS-CBN 2)
- 2009: Jessica Soho (Kapuso Mo, Jessica Soho / GMA 7)
- 2010: Jessica Soho (Kapuso Mo, Jessica Soho / GMA 7)
- 2011: Korina Sanchez (Rated K / ABS-CBN 2)
- 2012: Jessica Soho (Kapuso Mo, Jessica Soho / GMA 7)
- 2013: Jessica Soho (Kapuso Mo, Jessica Soho / GMA 7)
- 2014: Cesar Apolinario and Susan Enriquez (I Juander / GMA News TV)
- 2015: Korina Sanchez (Rated K / ABS-CBN 2)
- 2016: Korina Sanchez (Rated K / ABS-CBN 2)
- 2017: Korina Sanchez (Rated K / ABS-CBN 2)
- 2018: Korina Sanchez (Rated K / ABS-CBN 2)
- 2019: Korina Sanchez (Rated K / ABS-CBN 2)
- 2020: Jessica Soho (Kapuso Mo, Jessica Soho / GMA 7)
- 2021: Susan Enriquez and Mark Salazar (IJuander / GTV 27)
- 2023: Korina Sanchez (Rated Korina / A2Z 11, TV5)
- 2024: Marc Logan (Top 5: Mga Kwentong Marc Logan / TV5)
