= Salamat Dok =

Philippine television infotainment show

- Final title card used from 2017 to 2020
- Genre: Infotainment
- Directed by: Arnel Jacobe
- Presented by: Cheryl Cosim; Bernadette Sembrano; Alvin Elchico; Jing Castañeda
- Theme music composer: Vehnee Saturno
- Opening theme: "There for You" by Laurie Burgess (2004-2007) "Salamat Dok" by KEMis 3 (2007-2020)
- Country of origin: Philippines
- Original language: Filipino

Production
- Executive producer: Marielle Gaceta-Catbagan
- Editors: Nitz Cabalit; Mayet Manlutac; Gil Manimbo; Rochie Bernabe; Dominic Salvacion
- Camera setup: Multiple-camera setup
- Running time: 60 minutes
- Production companies: ABS-CBN News and Current Affairs; ABS-CBN Foundation

Original release
- Network: ABS-CBN
- Release: April 24, 2004 – March 15, 2020

Salamat Dok (transl. thanks doc) is a Philippine television infotainment show broadcast by ABS-CBN. Originally hosted by Cheryl Cosim, it aired from April 24, 2004 to March 15, 2020, replacing Magandang Umaga, Bayan Weekend. Bernadette Sembrano, Alvin Elchico and Jing Castañeda served as the final hosts.

== History ==
The program premiered on April 24, 2004 with Cheryl Cosim as its host alongside ABS-CBN reporter Pier Pastor as one of its segment hosts. It won several awards from prestigious award-giving bodies like the Anak TV Seal in 2006 and 2007, KBP Golden Dove in 2007 and the USTv Students' Choice 2008 as Best Public Service program. It celebrated its 4th anniversary with their anniversary episodes, which featured recent scandals and controversies that rocked the medical community.

In March 2010, Bernadette Sembrano permanently replaced Cheryl Cosim, who had moved to TV5. This rivalry is due to GMA launching its own program, Pinoy M.D.

In August 2011, Alvin Elchico joins Sembrano as the new host of the show.

Veteran news personality and celebrity mom, Jing Castañeda, also joined the team as Program Host in December 2012, taking care of family issues/health, as well as the show's medical missions and healthy cooking segment.

On March 30, 2019, it aired its final episode on Saturday to give way for the 2 News and Current Affairs programs of ABS-CBN, namely: Mission Possible and My Puhunan.

The current status of the program remained unknown until it was eventually cancelled on March 15, 2020 due to temporary closure of ABS-CBN because of the cease and desist order of the National Telecommunications Commission (NTC), following the expiration of the network's 25-year franchise granted in 1995.

The show resumed thru online and social media platforms as Thank You, Doc! on November 24, 2020.

== Hosts ==
=== Final hosts ===
- Bernadette Sembrano (2010–20)
- Alvin Elchico (2011–20)
- Jing Castañeda (2012–20)

=== Final segment hosts ===
- Pier Pastor (2004–20)
- Bryan Termulo (2016–20)

=== Former hosts ===
- Cheryl Cosim (2004–10)
- Sol Aragones (2011–12)

== Awards and nominations ==
- 6th UPLB Gandingan Awards Best Public Service Program Host (2012)
- 7th USTv Students’ Choice Awards Awards Best Public Service Program (2011)
- Winner, Best Public Service Program: 8th Gawad Tanglaw (2010)
- Winner, Best TV Public Affairs Program (2010) 19th Golden Dove Award
- Winner, Best TV Public Affairs Program (2009) 18th Golden Dove Award
- Winner, Best Public Service Program: 7th Gawad Tanglaw (2009)
- 5th USTv Students’ Choice Awards Awards Best Public Service Program (2009)
- Winner, Best TV Public Affairs Program (2008) 17th Golden Dove Award
- Winner, Best TV Public Affairs Program (2008) 16th Golden Dove Award

== See also ==
- List of programs broadcast by ABS-CBN
