= PEP (People, Events and Places) Talk =

- Genre: Lifestyle
- Presented by: Loren Legarda
- Country of origin: Philippines
- Original language: English

Original release
- Network: ABS-CBN
- Release: September 21, 1986 – July 3, 1990

PEP (People, Events and Places) Talk is a Philippine television lifestyle show broadcast by ABS-CBN. Hosted by Loren Legarda, it aired from September 21, 1986, to July 3, 1990, and was replaced by The Inside Story. The show is considered as a precursor to Philippine feature programs.

== Host ==
- Loren Legarda

== Awards ==
The show obtained three Catholic Mass Media Awards and was a CCP Gawad Awardee for 1987 and 1988. In 1988, Legarda also won the PMPC Star Award for Best Magazine Show Host.

== Reception ==
Henry Tejero of Manila Standard considers it as one of the Top 10 local programs for the year 1988 saying that it brings back the romance to the rather drab presentations of documentaries.

== See also ==
- List of programs broadcast by ABS-CBN
