= Jing Castañeda =

Filipino broadcast journalist (born 1970)

- Born: Rosamy Castañeda; July 27, 1970 (age 56); Manila, Philippines
- Education: Ateneo de Manila University
- Occupations: Broadcast journalist, columnist
- Television: Salamat Dok (program co-host, 2012–2020)
- Spouse: Nonong Velasco (m. 2003)
- Children: 3
- Website: jingcastaneda.ph

Rosamy "Jing" Castañeda-Velasco (born July 27, 1970) is a Filipino broadcast journalist who has served more than 20 years at ABS-CBN before venturing into other communications work.

== Education ==
Castañeda took up communication arts and MBA at the Ateneo de Manila University where she met her eventual husband; she was a cheerleader while he was part of the male cheering squad Blue Babble Battalion.

== Career ==
=== Broadcast journalist at ABS-CBN ===
Castañeda was ABS-CBN's reporter, news presenter, anchor, producer, and program director of Bantay Bata.

== Personal life ==
Castañeda married businessman Nong Velasco in 2003. They have three daughters.

Among the public figures she has interviewed, she considers Mother Teresa and Popes John Paul II and Francis as the most influential in her life.

== Major awards and recognition ==
- "Excellence in Broadcast Journalism", Federation of Associations of Private Schools Administrators (2013)
- "Best Morning Show Host" at the 28th PMPC Star Awards for Television, Philippine Movie Press Club (2014)
- Nutrition Ambassador, Department of Science and Technology - Food and Nutrition Research Institute (DOST-FNRI)
- "Platinum Heart Awards", Philippine Heart Center (2022)
- "Asia's Reliable and Trusted Multiplatform Host/Anchor and Producer", Asia's Modern Hero Awards (2024)
