= The Correspondents (TV program) =

- Genre: Documentary
- Created by: ABS-CBN Corporation
- Developed by: ABS-CBN News and Current Affairs
- Directed by: JV Noriega; Nico Hernandez
- Presented by: Mari Kaimo; Jim Libiran; Aljo Bendijo; Erwin Tulfo; Cherie Mercado; Korina Sanchez; Karen Davila; Abner Mercado; Ces Drilon; Bernadette Sembrano; Alex Santos
- Country of origin: Philippines
- Original languages: English and Filipino (1998–1999); Filipino (1999–2010)
- No. of episodes: 622

Production
- Executive producer: Romel Bernardo
- Producer: Wins Aguilar
- Running time: 45–60 minutes

Original release
- Network: ABS-CBN
- Release: November 10, 1998 – October 19, 2010

The Correspondents is a Philippine television documentary show broadcast by ABS-CBN. Originally hosted by Mari Kaimo, Jim Libiran, Erwin Tulfo, Cherie Mercado, and Korina Sanchez, it aired from November 10, 1998, to October 19, 2010, replacing The Inside Story and was replaced by Patrol ng Pilipino. Karen Davila, Abner Mercado, Bernadette Sembrano, and Alex Santos served as the final hosts. It brought an in-depth look at the lives of people as they lived, going through hardships and celebrating their joys. "Ang Huling Pagtatanghal" served as the show's final episode. The show aired for 11 years and 11 months, making it the longest-running weekly investigative documentary show in the Philippines.

== Hosts ==
=== Main and Final hosts ===
- Karen Davila (2000–10)
- Abner Mercado (2000–10)
- Bernadette Sembrano (2007–10)
- Alex Santos (2010)

=== Guest hosts ===
- Gus Abelgas
- Dominic Almelor (is now worked of Civil Defense)
- Sol Aragones
- Atom Araullo (is now hosting GMA's, i-Witness and anchored GTV's, State of the Nation)
- Adrian Ayalin
- Julius Babao (is now anchor for TV5's, Frontline Pilipinas)
- Connie Sison (is now anchor for GTV's, Balitanghali)
- Jeff Canoy
- Ricky Carandang
- Jorge Cariño
- Jing Castañeda
- Dyan Castillejo
- Niña Corpuz
- Ron Cruz
- Alvin Elchico
- Ted Failon
- Zen Hernandez
- Gretchen Malalad
- Henry Omaga-Diaz
- Anthony Taberna (now hosting DZRH's, Dos por Dos)
- Tony Velasquez
- Nadia Trinidad
- Pia Hontiveros
- Pinky Webb
- Rico Yan

== Previous hosts ==
- Ces Drilon
- Mari Kaimo
- Jim Libiran
- Ed Lingao
- Jade Lopez
- Cherie Mercado (1998–2004)
- Patrick Paez
- Korina Sanchez (1998–2000)
- Anne Torres
- Erwin Tulfo

== Awards and nominations ==
- Winner, Best TV Documentary (Abner Mercado's Team)- Population Development Media Awards (2009)
- Nominated, Best Documentary Program - PMPC Star Awards for Television (2009)
- Nominated, Best Documentary Program Host - PMPC Star Awards for Television (2009)
- Nominated, Best Documentary Program - PMPC Star Awards for Television (2008)
- Nominated, Best Documentary Program Host - PMPC Star Awards for Television (2008)
- Runner-up, Best TV Documentary (Bernadette Sembrano's Team) - Population Development Media Awards (2008)
- Runner-up, Best TV Documentary (Karen Davila's Team) - Population Development Media Awards (2008)
- Winner, Best Magazine Program - 29th Catholic Mass Media Awards (2007)
- Nominated, Best Documentary Program - PMPC Star Awards for Television (2007)
- Winner, Best Documentary Program - PMPC Star Awards for Television (2006)
- Nominated, Best Documentary Program - PMPC Star Awards for Television (2005)
- Winner, Best Documentary Program - PMPC Star Awards for Television (2004)
- Winner, Best Documentary Program - PMPC Star Awards for Television (2003)
