= Cheche Lazaro Presents =

Philippine television documentary show

- Title card
- Genre: Documentary
- Presented by: Cheche Lazaro
- Theme music composer: Arvin "Caliph" Noguera
- Country of origin: Philippines
- Original language: Tagalog

Production
- Executive producer: Cheche Lazaro
- Producer: Jason Reyes
- Editors: Jason Reyes; Liwliwa Malabed
- Camera setup: Multiple-camera setup
- Running time: 42 minutes
- Production companies: Probe Productions, Inc.; Unlimited Productions, Inc.

Original release
- Network: GMA Network (1999–2003); ABS-CBN (2010–14)
- Release: February 14, 1999 – June 22, 2014

Cheche Lazaro Presents is a Philippine television documentary series broadcast by GMA Network. Hosted by Cheche Lazaro, it premiered on February 14, 1999 and concluded on June 22, 2003. The show aired occasionally on ABS-CBN from 2010 to 2014.
