= Excellence In Broadcasting Lifetime Achievement Award =

The Excellence in Broadcasting Lifetime Achievement Award is an honorary Star Award for Television bestowed by the Philippine Movie Press Club to recognize the long-time broadcast journalists of the news, information, public affairs and public service in the media for lifetime achievement within the television industry in the Philippines.

== Honorees ==
2006: Harry Gasser (RPN 9 "Now RPTV 9, ABS-CBN 2)

2007: Mel Tiangco (GMA 7)

2008: Loren Legarda (ABS-CBN 2)

2009: Noli de Castro (ABS-CBN 2)

2010: Che Che Lazaro (ABS-CBN 2)

2011: Jessica Soho (GMA 7)

2012: Tina Monzon-Palma (ANC)

2013: Rey Langit (PTV 4)

2014: Mike Enriquez (GMA 7)

2015: Maria Ressa (ABS-CBN 2, TV5)

2016: Luchi Cruz-Valdes (TV5)

2017: Martin Andanar (TV5)

2018: Arnold Clavio (GMA 7)

2019: Vicky Morales (GMA 7)

2020: Korina Sanchez (ABS-CBN 2, TV5)

2021: Raffy Tulfo (TV5)

2023: Angelique Lazo (PTV 4)

2024: Julius Babao (TV5)
