= PMPC Star Award for Best Drama Supporting Actor & Actress =

The PMPC Star Award for Best Best Drama Supporting Actor & Actress is given to the best supporting actors & actresses in a drama series since 2013.

== Winners ==
=== Supporting Actors ===
2013: Arjo Atayde (Dugong Buhay / ABS-CBN 2) and Arron Villaflor (Juan dela Cruz / ABS-CBN 2) [tied]

2014: John Estrada (Ikaw Lamang / ABS-CBN 2)

2015: Baron Geisler (Nathaniel / ABS-CBN 2)

2016: Arjo Atayde (Ang Probinsyano / ABS-CBN 2) and Arron Villaflor (All of Me / ABS-CBN 2) [tied]

2017: Daniel Fernando (Ikaw Lang Ang Iibigin / ABS-CBN 2)

2018: Gabby Eigenmann (Contessa / GMA 7)

2019: Arjo Atayde (The General's Daughter / ABS-CBN 2)

2020: Roderick Paulate (One of the Baes / GMA 7)

2021: John Estrada (Babawiin Ko Ang Lahat / GMA 7)

2023: Elijah Canlas (Senior High / A2Z 11, TV5)

2024: Arnold Reyes (My Guardian Alien / GMA 7) and Dennis Trillo (Pulang Araw / GMA 7) [tied]

==== Total of number of wins ====
Arjo Atayde - 3 awards

Arron Villaflor - 2 awards

John Estrada - 2 awards

=== Supporting Actresses ===
2013: KC Concepcion (Huwag Ka Lang Mawawala / ABS-CBN 2)

2014: KC Concepcion (Ikaw Lamang / ABS-CBN 2)

2015: Sheryl Cruz (Strawberry Lane / GMA 7)

2016: Sunshine Dizon (Little Nanay / GMA 7)

2017: Aiko Melendez (Wildflower / ABS-CBN 2)

2018: Kyline Alcantara (Kambal, Karibal / GMA 7) & Lorna Tolentino (Asintado / ABS-CBN 2) [tied]

2019: Janice de Belen (The General's Daughter / ABS-CBN 2)

2020: Aiko Melendez (Prima Donnas / GMA 7)

2021: Sylvia Sanchez (Huwag Kang Mangamba / A2Z 11, TV5)

2023: Cherry Pie Picache (FPJ's Batang Quiapo / A2Z 11, TV5)

2024: Janine Gutierrez (Lavender Fields / A2Z 11, TV5)

==== Total of number of wins ====
KC Concepcion - 2 awards

Aiko Melendez - 2 awards
