= PMPC Star Award for Best Drama Series =

The PMPC Star Award for Best Drama Series is given to the best television dramas of the year.

== Winners ==
=== Single Category ===
1987: Lovingly Yours, Helen (GMA 7)

1988:

1989: Lovingly Yours, Helen (GMA 7)

1990:

1991: Agila (ABS-CBN 2)

1992: Valiente (ABS-CBN 2)

1993: Valiente (ABS-CBN 2)

1994: Valiente (ABS-CBN 2)

1995: Valiente (GMA-7)

1996: Villa Quintana (GMA 7)

1997: Familia Zaragoza (ABS-CBN 2)

1998: Mula Sa Puso (ABS-CBN 2)

1999: Marinella (ABS-CBN 2)

2000: Kirara, Ano Ang Kulay ng Pag-ibig? (GMA 7)

2001: Pangako Sa'yo (ABS-CBN 2)

2002: Kung Mawawala Ka (GMA 7)

2003: Kay Tagal Kang Hinintay (ABS-CBN 2)

2012: Amaya (GMA 7)

Notes:

- In 1992, Lovingly Yours, Helen was nominated as "Best Drama Anthology".

=== Drama Serial ===
1987: Heredero (RPN 9)

1988: Agila (RPN 9)

1989: Agila (ABS-CBN 2)

=== Primetime Drama Series ===
2004: Marina (ABS-CBN 2)

2005: Mulawin (GMA 7)

2006: Sa Piling Mo (ABS-CBN 2)

2007: Maging Sino Ka Man (ABS-CBN 2)

2008: Lobo (ABS-CBN 2)

2009: May Bukas Pa (ABS-CBN 2)

2010: Dahil May Isang Ikaw (ABS-CBN 2)

2011: Minsan Lang Kita Iibigin (ABS-CBN 2)

2013: Juan dela Cruz (ABS-CBN 2)

2014: Ikaw Lamang (ABS-CBN 2)

2015: Bridges of Love (ABS-CBN 2)

2016: Ang Probinsyano (ABS-CBN 2)

2017: Alyas Robin Hood (GMA 7) and La Luna Sangre (ABS-CBN 2) [tied]

2018: The Good Son (ABS-CBN 2)

2019: The General's Daughter (ABS-CBN 2)

2020: Pamilya Ko (ABS-CBN 2)

2021: Huwag Kang Mangamba (A2Z 11/TV5)

2023: Maria Clara at Ibarra (GMA 7)

2024: FPJ's Batang Quiapo (A2Z 11/TV5)

=== Daytime Drama Series ===
2004: Ikaw Sa Puso Ko (GMA 7)

2005: Now and Forever (GMA 7)

2006: Now and Forever (GMA 7)

2007: Sinasamba Kita (GMA 7) & Love Spell (ABS-CBN 2) as "Best Weekly Daytime Drama Series"

2008: Kaputol ng Isang Awit (GMA 7)

2009: Pieta (ABS-CBN 2)

2010: Rosalka (ABS-CBN 2)

2011: Little Star (GMA 7)

2013: Be Careful With My Heart (ABS-CBN 2)

2014: Be Careful With My Heart (ABS-CBN 2)

2015: The Half Sisters (GMA 7)

2016: Doble Kara (ABS-CBN 2)

2017: The Greatest Love (ABS-CBN 2)

2018: Contessa (GMA 7)

2019: Kadenang Ginto (ABS-CBN 2)

2020: Madrasta (GMA 7)

2021: Prima Donnas (GMA 7)

2023: Abot-Kamay na Pangarap (GMA 7)

2024: Abot-Kamay na Pangarap (GMA 7)

=== Drama Mini Series ===
1992: Cebu & Davao (RPN 9) [tied]

1993:

1994:

1995:

1996:

1997:

1998: Pira-pirasong Pangarap (GMA 7)

1999:

2000: Pira-pirasong Pangarap (GMA 7)

2001: Pira-pirasong Pangarap (GMA 7)

2002: Pira-pirasong Pangarap (GMA 7)

2009: Your Song Presents: My Only Hope (ABS-CBN 2)

2010: SRO Cinemaserye: The Eva Castillo Story (GMA 7)

2015: Illustrado (GMA 7)

2021: Agimat ng Agila (GMA 7) & He's Into Her (A2Z 11)

2023: Walang Matigas na Pulis sa Matinik na Misis (GMA 7)

2024: Walang Matigas na Pulis sa Matinik na Misis (GMA 7)

=== Drama Anthology ===
1992: Maalaala Mo Kaya (ABS-CBN 2)

1993:

1994: Lovingly Yours (GMA 7) "as Best Daytime Drama Anthology" & Spotlight (GMA 7) "as Best Primetime Drama Anthology"

1995: Maalaala Mo Kaya (ABS-CBN 2)

1996: Coney Reyes on Camera (ABS-CBN 2)

1997:

1998: Maalaala Mo Kaya (ABS-CBN 2)

1999:

2000: Maalaala Mo Kaya (ABS-CBN 2)

2001: Maalaala Mo Kaya (ABS-CBN 2)

2002: Maalaala Mo Kaya (ABS-CBN 2)

2003: Maalaala Mo Kaya (ABS-CBN 2)

2004: Maalaala Mo Kaya (ABS-CBN 2)

2005: Maalaala Mo Kaya (ABS-CBN 2)

2006: Maalaala Mo Kaya (ABS-CBN 2)

2007: Maalaala Mo Kaya (ABS-CBN 2)

2008: Maalaala Mo Kaya (ABS-CBN 2)

2009: Maalaala Mo Kaya (ABS-CBN 2)

2010: Maalaala Mo Kaya (ABS-CBN 2)

2011: Untold Stories Mula Sa Face To Face (TV 5) & Maalaala Mo Kaya (ABS-CBN 2) as Hall of Famer (15 times)

2012: Untold Stories Mula Sa Face To Face (TV 5)

2013: Magpakailanman (GMA-7)

2014: Magpakailanman (GMA-7)

2015: Magpakailanman (GMA-7)

2016: Ipaglaban Mo! (ABS-CBN 2)

2017: Ipaglaban Mo! (ABS-CBN 2)

2018: Ipaglaban Mo! (ABS-CBN 2)

2019: Ipaglaban Mo! (ABS-CBN 2)

2020: Ipaglaban Mo! (ABS-CBN 2)

2021: Magpakailanman (GMA 7)

2023: Magpakailanman (GMA 7)

2024: Magpakailanman (GMA 7)

Notes:

- Coney Reyes on Camera was won as "Best Drama Anthology" 3 times in 90's.
- Maalaala Mo Kaya is the longest-running Drama Anthology from 1991 to 2022.
