= PMPC Star Award for Best Game Show =

The PMPC Star Award for Best Game Show is given to the best television game shows of the year and also game show hosts.

== Winners ==
=== Game Shows ===
1987:

1988:

1989: Family Kuarta O Kahon (RPN 9)

1990:

1991: Not given

1992: It's A Date (RPN 9)

1993: Battle of The Brains (RPN 9)

1994: Battle of The Brains (RPN 9)

1995: Battle of The Brains (RPN 9)

1996: Battle of The Brains (RPN 9)

1997: GoBingo (GMA 7)

1998: not given

1999: Battle of The Brains (RPN 9)

2000: Sing Galing (ABC 5)

2001: Digital LG Quiz (GMA 7)

2002: Game KNB? (ABS-CBN 2)

2003: Game KNB? (ABS-CBN 2)

2004: Next Level Na, Game KNB? (ABS-CBN 2)

2005: Pilipinas, Game KNB? (ABS-CBN 2)

2006: Pilipinas, Game KNB? (ABS-CBN 2)

2007: Pilipinas, Game KNB? (ABS-CBN 2)

2008: Pilipinas, Game KNB? (ABS-CBN 2)

2009: Wowowee (ABS-CBN 2) as "Best Variety & Game Show"

2010: Wowowee (ABS-CBN 2) as "Best Variety & Game Show"

2011: Panahon Ko 'to!: Ang Game Show ng Buhay Ko (ABS-CBN 2)

2012: It's Showtime as "Best Reality & Game Show"

2013: Celebrity Bluff (GMA 7)

2014: Celebrity Bluff (GMA 7)

2015: Wowowin (GMA 7)

2016: Wowowin (GMA 7)

2017: Wowowin (GMA 7)

2023: Emojination (TV5)

2024: Wil To Win (TV5)

=== Game Show Hosts ===
1987:

1988:

1989:

1990:

1991: Not given

1992: Plinky Recto (It's A Date / RPN 9)

1993: David Celdran (Battle of The Brains / RPN 9)

1994: David Celdran (Battle of The Brains / RPN 9)

1995: David Celdran (Battle of The Brains / RPN 9)

1996: David Celdran (Battle of The Brains / RPN 9)

1997: Arnel Ignacio (GoBingo / GMA 7)

1998: not given

1999: David Celdran (Battle of The Brains / RPN 9)

2000: Allan K & Ai Ai delas Alas (Sing-Galing / ABC 5)

2001: Paolo Bediones & Regine Tolentino (Digital LG Quiz / GMA 7)

2002: Kris Aquino (Game K N B? /ABS-CBN 2)

2003: Kris Aquino (Game K N B? /ABS-CBN 2)

2004: Ai Ai delas Alas & John Lapus (Sing Galing / ABC 5)

2005: Kris Aquino (Pilipinas, Game KNB? / ABS-CBN 2)

2006: Arnel Ignacio (Now Na! / QTV 11)

2007: Edu Manzano (Pilipinas, Game KNB? / ABS-CBN 2)

2008: Edu Manzano (Pilipinas, Game KNB? / ABS-CBN 2)

2009: Richard Gomez (Family Feud / GMA 7)

2010: Vic Sotto (Who Wants to Be a Millionaire / TV5)

2011: Vic Sotto (Who Wants to Be a Millionaire / TV5)

2012: Kim Atienza, Ryan Bang, Teddy Corpuz, Billy Crawford, Anne Curtis, Coleen Garcia, Jhong Hilario, Jugs Jugueta, Karylle, Vhong Navarro, Joy Rendon and Vice Ganda (It’s Showtime / ABS-CBN 2) as "Best Reality & Game Show Host"

2013: Luis Manzano (Kapamilya Deal or No Deal / ABS-CBN 2)

2014: Judy Ann Santos (Bet on Your Baby / ABS-CBN)

2015: Luis Manzano (Kapamilya, Deal or No Deal / ABS-CBN 2) & Willie Revillame (Wowowin / GMA 7) [tied]

2016: Luis Manzano (Kapamilya, Deal or No Deal / ABS-CBN 2)

2017: Luis Manzano (Minute To Win It / ABS-CBN 2)

2023: Dingdong Dantes (Family Feud / GMA 7)

2024: Dingdong Dantes (Family Feud / GMA 7)
