= PMPC Star Award for Best Gag Show =

The PMPC Star Award for Best Gag Show is given to the best television sketch comedy of the year.

== Winners ==
- 1990: Sick O'Clock News (IBC 13)
- 1991: Mongolian Barbecue (IBC 13)
- 1992: Mongolian Barbecue (IBC 13)
- 1993: Mongolian Barbecue (RPN 9)
- 1994: Mixed N.U.T.S. (GMA 7)
- 1995: Tropang Trumpo (ABC 5)
- 1996: Bubble Gang (GMA 7)
- 1997: Bubble Gang (GMA 7)
- 1998: Bubble Gang (GMA 7)
- 1999: Bubble Gang (GMA 7)
- 2000: Bubble Gang (GMA 7)
- 2001: Bubble Gang (GMA 7)
- 2002: Bubble Gang (GMA 7)
- 2003: Bubble Gang (GMA 7)
- 2004: Bubble Gang (GMA 7)
- 2005: Bubble Gang (GMA 7) & Goin' Bulilit (ABS-CBN 2) [tied]
- 2006: Bubble Gang (GMA 7)
- 2007: Bubble Gang (GMA 7)
- 2008: Goin' Bulilit (ABS-CBN 2)
- 2009: Banana Split (ABS-CBN 2) & Bubble Gang (GMA 7) [tied]
- 2010: Banana Split (ABS-CBN 2)
- 2011: Bubble Gang (GMA 7)
- 2013: Banana Split: Extra Scoop (ABS-CBN 2) & Bubble Gang (GMA 7) [tied]
- 2014: Goin' Bulilit (ABS-CBN 2) & Bubble Gang (GMA 7) - Hall of Famer (15 times)
- 2015: Banana Split: Extra Scoop (ABS-CBN 2)
- 2016: Goin' Bulilit (ABS-CBN 2)
- 2017: Goin' Bulilit (ABS-CBN 2)
- 2018: Goin' Bulilit (ABS-CBN 2)

=== Multiple winners ===
15 awards

- Bubble Gang (consecutive)

6 awards

- Goin' Bulilit (consecutive)

4 awards

- Banana Split (consecutive)

3 awards

- Mongolian Barbecue (consecutive)
