= Miguel Rodríguez =

Miguel Rodríguez may refer to:

== In arts and entertainment ==
- Miguel Rodriguez (actor) (1961–1998), Filipino actor
- Miguel Augusto Rodríguez (born 1977), Venezuelan actor and model

== In sport ==
- Miguel Ángel Rodríguez (racewalker) (born 1967), Mexican race walker
- Miguel Rodríguez (golfer) (born 1973), Argentine professional golfer
- Miguel Ángel Rodríguez (squash player) (born 1985), Colombian squash player
- Miguel Rodríguez (footballer, born April 2003), Spanish football winger
- Miguel Rodríguez (footballer, born June 2003), Nicaraguan football goalkeeper
- Miguel Rodríguez (table tennis), Spanish table tennis player

== Other people ==
- Miguel Rodríguez (NASA) (born 1952), Puerto Rican who is the Chief of the Integration Office of the Cape Canaveral Spaceport Management Office
- Miguel Rodríguez Mackay (born 1967), Peruvian internationalist and foreign minister of Peru
- Miguel Rodríguez Orejuela (born 1943), Colombian drug lord
- Miguel Rodríguez Torres (born 1964), minister of the Popular Power for Interior, Justice and Peace of Venezuela
- Miguel Ángel Rodríguez (born 1940), Costa Rican economist, lawyer, businessman, and politician
- Miguel Rodriguez Rodriguez (1931–2001), Roman Catholic bishop

== See also ==
- Miguel Rodriguez (The Young and the Restless), a fictional character from The Young and the Restless
