= PMPC Star Award for Best Variety Show =

The PMPC Star Award for Best Musical & Variety Show is given to the best television musical & variety shows of the year.

== Winners ==
=== Variety Shows ===
1987: Eat Bulaga! (RPN 9)

1988: GMA Supershow (GMA 7)

1989: GMA Supershow (GMA 7)

1990: GMA Supershow (GMA 7)

1991: GMA Supershow (GMA 7)

1992: Saturday Entertainment (GMA 7)

1993: GMA Supershow (GMA 7)

1994: GMA Supershow (GMA 7)

1995: Eat Bulaga! (GMA 7)

1996: Eat Bulaga! (GMA 7)

1997: Eat Bulaga! (GMA 7)

1998: Eat Bulaga! (GMA 7)

1999: Eat Bulaga! (GMA 7)

2000: Eat Bulaga! (GMA 7)

2001: Eat Bulaga! (GMA 7)

2002: Eat Bulaga! (GMA 7)

2003: Eat Bulaga! (GMA 7)

2004: Eat Bulaga! (GMA 7)

2005: Eat Bulaga! (GMA 7)

2006: Eat Bulaga! (GMA 7)

2007: Eat Bulaga! (GMA 7)

2008: Eat Bulaga! (GMA 7) & Wowowee (ABS-CBN 2) [tied]

2009: Wowowee (ABS-CBN 2) as "Best Variety & Game Show" & Eat Bulaga! (GMA 7) as "Hall of Famer (15 times)"

2010: Wowowee (ABS-CBN 2) as "Best Variety & Game Show"

2011: Willing Willie (TV5)

2013: It's Showtime! (ABS-CBN 2)

2014: It's Showtime! (ABS-CBN 2)

2015: not given

2016: Sunday PinaSaya (GMA 7)

2017: Sunday PinaSaya (GMA 7)

2018: Sunday PinaSaya (GMA 7)

2019: Sunday PinaSaya (GMA 7)

2020: It's Showtime! (ABS-CBN 2)

2021: All-Out Sundays (GMA 7)

2023: It's Showtime! (A2Z 11, GTV 27)

2024: It's Showtime! (A2Z 11, All TV 2, GMA 7, GTV 27)

=== Musical Variety Shows ===
1987: Superstar (RPN-9) and Vilma! (GMA-7) [tied]

1988: Vilma! (GMA-7)

1989: Vilma! (GMA-7)

1990: Vilma! (GMA-7)

1991: Vilma! (GMA-7)

1992: Vilma! (GMA-7)

1993: The Sharon Cuneta Show (ABS-CBN 2)

1994: Vilma! (GMA-7)

1995:

1996: GMA Supershow (GMA-7)

1997: The Sharon Cuneta Show (ABS-CBN 2)

1998: ASAP (ABS-CBN 2)

1999: ASAP (ABS-CBN 2)

2000: ASAP (ABS-CBN 2) & SOP Rules (GMA-7) [tied]

2001: SOP (GMA-7)

2002: SOP (GMA-7)

2003: ASAP (ABS-CBN 2)

2004: ASAP Mania (ABS-CBN 2)

2005: ASAP '05 (ABS-CBN 2)

2006: ASAP '06 (ABS-CBN 2)

2007: ASAP '07 (ABS-CBN 2)

2008: SOP Rules (GMA-7)

2009: ASAP '09 (ABS-CBN 2)

2010: ASAP XV (ABS-CBN 2)

2011: ASAP Rocks (ABS-CBN 2)

2012: ASAP 2012 (ABS-CBN 2) as "Best Musical & Variety Show"

2013: ASAP 18 (ABS-CBN 2)

2014: ASAP 19 (ABS-CBN 2)

2015: ASAP 20 (ABS-CBN 2)

2016: ASAP (ABS-CBN 2)

2017: ASAP (ABS-CBN 2)

2018: Letters and Music (Net 25) & ASAP (ABS-CBN 2) as "Hall of Famer (15 times)"

2019: SMAC Pinoy Ito! (IBC 13) & Young Once Upon A Time (Net 25) [tied]

2020: Young Once Upon A Time (Net 25)

2021: Letters and Music (Net 25)

2024: Letters and Music (Net 25)

Note: The category is merged with Best Game Show in 2009 and 2010; and Best Musical Variety Show in 2012.
