= The Inside Story (TV program) =

- Genre: Public affairs
- Created by: ABS-CBN Corporation
- Developed by: ABS-CBN News and Current Affairs
- Presented by: Loren Legarda; Korina Sanchez; Julius Babao; Mari Kaimo; Cathy Yang
- Country of origin: Philippines
- Original languages: English; Filipino
- No. of episodes: Varies

Production
- Running time: 60 minutes

Original release
- Network: ABS-CBN
- Release: July 10, 1990 – November 3, 1998

The Inside Story is a Philippine television public affairs show broadcast by ABS-CBN. Originally hosted by Loren Legarda and Korina Sanchez, it aired from July 10, 1990, to November 3, 1998, replacing PEP (People, Events and Places) Talk and was replaced by The Correspondents. Julius Babao, Cathy Yang and Mari Kaimo serve as the final hosts.

== Format ==
The program was a 60-minute news magazine program produced by the News and Current Affairs Department of ABS-CBN Broadcasting Corporation. As its title suggests, the program provided incisive and investigative accounts on important events and significant personages that shapes the Filipino nation.

Divided into three independent segments, each episode of The Inside Story endeavors to enrich the national consciousness of the viewing public and help mold public opinion by providing them with vignettes of both contemporary and indigenous culture. Geared for an audience of young professionals, as well as policy-makers and decision-makers, The Inside Story has observed a steadily growing viewership among students, who consider the program's accurate reportage and engaging visual elements a good reference for socio-cultural and political concerns, not only in the local scenario but in the global village as well.

== Broadcast ==
Anchored by broadcast journalist Loren Legarda, The Inside Story has garnered numerous awards and citations for its endeavors and has enjoyed remarkable program ratings since its inception in 1990.

By the second half of 1993, the program was consistently receiving high ratings according to the Pulsitron Survey, repeatedly achieving the No. 1 position among English public affairs programs.

Since November 1994, the Pulse TV Meter Report has consistently cited The Inside Story as among the Top 20 late evening shows in the country—a first among News and Current Affairs programs in the late-night timeslot. It continues to enjoy double-digit ratings and is considered the leader in viewership among late evening news magazines.

"The Inside Story" concerns itself greatly preserving the moral fiber of the nation, which is in a constant state of flux. Therefore, aside from the standard reports on the "headline" materials, the program also features matters of cultural, social, and environmental interest. It has also been serving the global Filipino with coverage spanning the whole archipelago, as well as key cities in Asia, Europe, the United States and the Middle East.

The program was known by its tagline: "Multi-awarded. Accurate. Credible. Top-rating. World-class."

In 1995, the program was reformatted as Legarda goes on location outside the studio for an interview with the various personalities.

== Hosts ==
- Loren Legarda (1990–1998)
- Korina Sanchez (1990–1991)
- Julius Babao (1998)
- Cathy Yang (1998)
- Mari Kaimo (1998)

== Trivia ==
- The show's excerpts were shown in 2006 due to a report in TV Patrol World where it was related to the show.
- They had numerous interviews with Eraserheads in 1997, Michael Jackson in December 1996 and Nelson Mandela also in 1997, among others.

== See also ==
- ABS-CBN News and Current Affairs
- List of programs broadcast by ABS-CBN
