= Arjo Atayde =

Filipino actor and politician (born 1990)

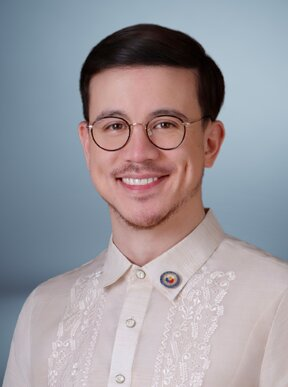
- Official portrait, 2026

Assistant Majority Leader of the House of Representatives of the Philippines
- Incumbent
- Assumed office July 29, 2025 Serving with several others
- Leader: Sandro Marcos

Member of the Philippine House of Representatives from Quezon City's 1st district
- Incumbent
- Assumed office June 30, 2022
- Preceded by: Anthony Peter Crisologo

Personal details
- Born: Juan Carlos Campo Atayde; November 5, 1990 (age 35) Quezon City, Philippines
- Party: NUP (2026–present); SBP (local party; 2021–present)
- Other political affiliations: Nacionalista (2022–2026); Independent (2021–2022)
- Spouse: Maine Mendoza (m. 2023)
- Relations: Ria Atayde (sister); Coleen Garcia (cousin); Zanjoe Marudo (brother-in-law)
- Parent(s): Art Atayde; Sylvia Sanchez
- Education: De La Salle University
- Occupation: Actor
- Profession: Politician
- Awards: Best New Male TV Personality - PMPC 2012; Best Drama Supporting Actor for TV - PMPC 2013; Best Single Performance by an Actor - PMPC 2014; Best Drama Supporting Actor of the Year - PMPC 2016; Best Actor in a Leading Role - 3rd Asian Academy Creative Awards 2020

Juan Carlos "Arjo" Campo Atayde (born November 5, 1990) is a Filipino actor and politician who has served as the representative for Quezon City's 1st district since 2022. He is best known for his appearances on drama series aired on ABS-CBN with his single GMA Network appearance on Maynila, as well as his critically acclaimed role as Benjo in the web series Bagman. A member of the National Unity Party, Atayde was first elected to Congress as an independent in the 2022 general elections, where he unseated incumbent representative Onyx Crisologo.

== Early life and education ==
Atayde was born on November 5, 1990, to actress Sylvia Sanchez and Spanish-Filipino businessman Arturo Atayde. He is the eldest with three younger siblings: Ria, Gela, and Xavi. Arjo studied at La Salle Green Hills and later moved to Reedley International School.

== Entertainment and business career ==
His first official venture into acting was at age 9 for Ang TV. However, he was pulled out of acting when it affected his schooling. Atayde's first notable appearance was more than a decade later, in 2012, for the show E-Boy as "Jepoy".

He has played several starring roles in the drama anthology series Maalaala Mo Kaya. He appeared in the episodes "Bangka", "Dos Por Dos", "Itlog", "Liham", "Marital Lies", "Sibuyan Siblings", and "Tsubibo". For his acting in the series, he won the following awards from PMPC Star Awards for Television: "Best Male New TV Personality" in 2012 for "Bangka" and Best Single Performance by an Actor in 2014 for his portrayal of a gay parent in "Dos Por Dos".

In 2013, he starred as Rafael de Lara in the daytime television series Dugong Buhay for which he won a PMPC Star Awards for Best Single Performance by an Actor. He then went on to star in the Korean adaptation, Pure Love as Raymond de la Cruz/Ramon Esguerra. The following year, he was given his biggest role to date as the main antagonist Joaquin Tuazon on FPJ's Ang Probinsyano. He also won a PMPC Star Awards for Best Single Performance by an Actor for this role.

He continued to have various notable roles in 2019 for which he received many accolades. Most noteworthy are his portrayals of Benjo, a barber who falls into criminality, in the iWant TV exclusive show Bagman where he won Best Actor in Leading Role award during the 3rd Asian Academy Creative Awards, and then as Elai, a man with autism, in The General's Daughter. The latter brought him praise on social media, including the approval of Autism Society Philippines for his sensitive and nuanced representation of autism.

In July 2024, Atayde launched his first "Inasal Republic," Tatak Ilonggo branch in West Avenue in Quezon City. It also has branches in Scout Gandia, Tomas Morato Avenue and Masinag Antipolo City. The chain restaurant is his joint venture with film director Richard Somes, entrepreneurs Mark San Diego, Ivan Villamar, and cousin Gabby Atayde.

== Political career ==
=== Congressional career (2022–present) ===
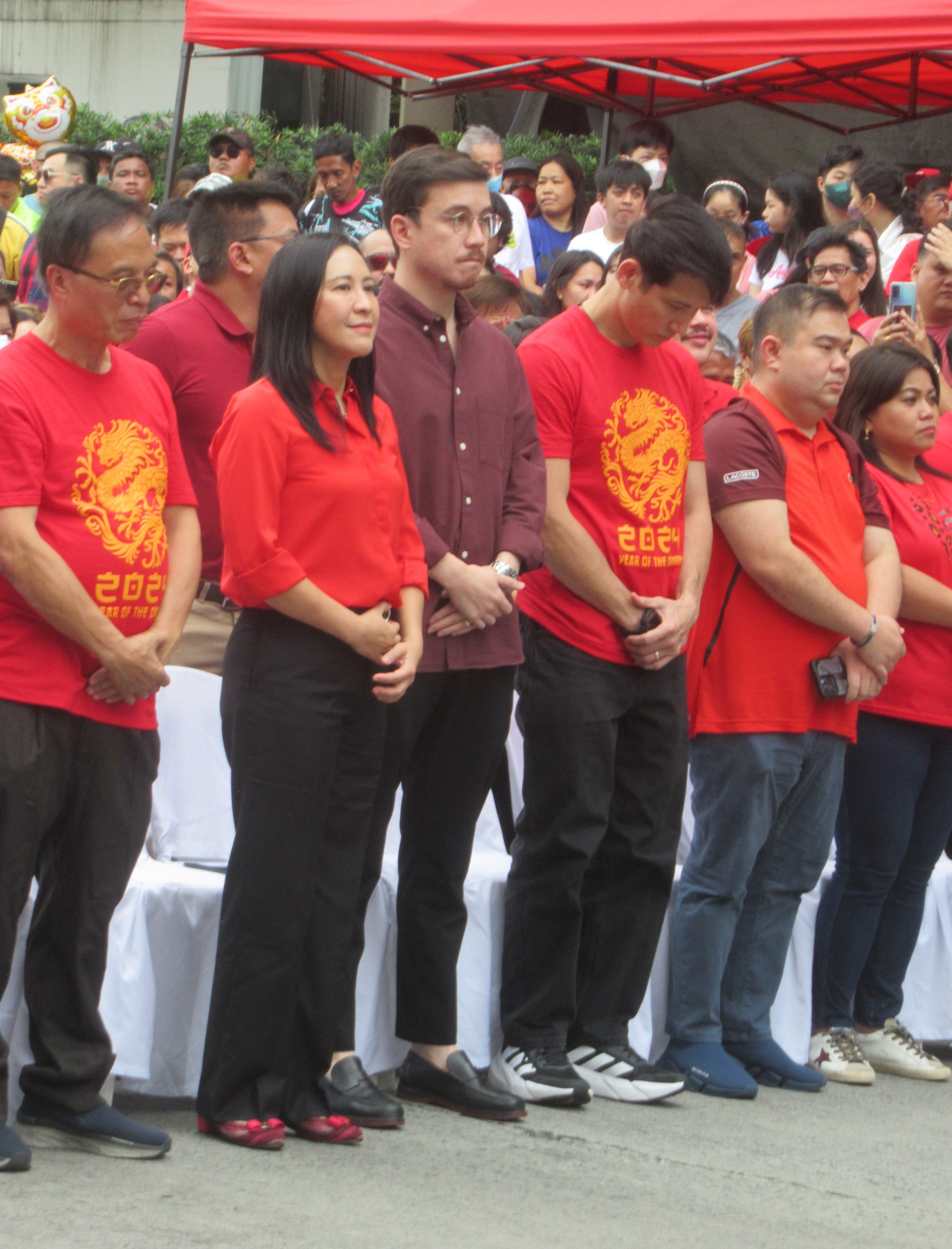
Atayde (center) with Quezon City Mayor Joy Belmonte (2nd from left) and Vice Mayor Gian Sotto (2nd from right) during the 2024 Chinese New Year festival at Banawe Chinatown District

In 2022, Atayde ran for representative in Quezon City's 1st congressional district. He ran as an independent with the backing of the Joy Belmonte-led Serbisyo sa Bayan Party. He was elected with 66.85% of the vote, unseating incumbent Onyx Crisologo. He was sworn in on June 30, 2022.

On October 8, 2022, Atayde joined the Nacionalista Party, being sworn in by fellow Representative Sandro Marcos (Ilocos Norte–1st).

During the Senate Blue Ribbon Committee hearings on the flood control projects controversy on 8 September 2025, Atayde was one of several lawmakers and government officials named by contractors Curlee and Sarah Discaya allegedly involved in alleged irregularities in government flood control projects. Atayde has denied the allegations as "falsehoods."

== Personal life ==
In 2016, he was reportedly courting actress Jane Oineza but it did not work out. Atayde then dated a member of GirlTrends, Sammie Rimando, until 2018. In 2018, he began dating Maine Mendoza, whom he married on July 28, 2023, at a wedding ceremony in Baguio.

== Electoral history ==
Electoral history of Arjo Atayde
Year	Office	Party		Votes received				Result
Year	Office	Local	National	Total	%	P.	Swing	Result
2022	Representative (Quezon City–1st)	SBP	Independent	112,457	66.85%	1st	—N/a	Won
2025	Representative (Quezon City–1st)	SBP	Nacionalista	93,999	58.53%	1st	-8.32	Won

== Filmography ==
=== Television ===
Year	Title	Role	Notes
2001–2002	Ang TV	Himself	
2012	E-Boy	Jepoy	Supporting Cast
2012	Maalaala Mo Kaya	Richard Abaño	Episode Cast
2012	Maynila	Danny	Episode: "Aking Prinsesa"
2013	Carlo J. Caparas' Dugong Buhay	Rafael de Lara	Main Cast
2013	Toda Max	RJ Catacutan	
2013	Maalaala Mo Kaya	Jay	Episode: "Puntod"
2013	Maalaala Mo Kaya	Erni	Episode: "Tsubibo"
2014	Pure Love	Raymond Dela Cruz	Main Cast
2014	Maalaala Mo Kaya	Jess	Episode: "Dos Por Dos"
2014	Maalaala Mo Kaya	Fr. Francis	Episode: "Liham"
2015	Maalaala Mo Kaya	Jason Villanueva	Episode: "Pictures"
2015	Wansapanataym	younger grandfather of Eric	Episode: "Remote ni Eric"
2015	Nathaniel	Pedro Alvaro	Guest Cast
2015	Kapamilya, Deal or No Deal	Briefcase number 13	
2015–2017	FPJ's Ang Probinsyano	Police C/Insp. Joaquin S. Tuazon	Main Cast
2016–2020	Ipaglaban Mo!	Various Roles	
2016	Maalaala Mo Kaya	Simon	Episode: "Itlog"
2017	Maalaala Mo Kaya	Rocky Gathercole	Episode: "Sketch Pad"
2017–2018	Hanggang Saan	Atty. Francisco "Paco" Alipio	Lead Cast
2019	The General's Daughter	Elijah "Elai" Sarmiento	Main Cast
2020	24/7	Cedric Jacinto	Main Cast
2020	Maalaala Mo Kaya	Dr. Israel "El" Bactol	Episode: "Stethoscope"
2020	Maalaala Mo Kaya	Dr. Israel "El" Bactol	Episode: "Bracelet"
2020	Trip to Quiapo		
2023	Cattleya Killer	Anton dela Rosa	Lead Cast
2025	The Bagman	Benjo Malaya	

=== Film ===
Year	Title	Role
2017	Ang Panday	Previous Lizardo
2018	BuyBust	Biggie Chen
2018	Jack Em Popoy: The Puliscredibles	Andrew Montenegro
2019	Stranded	Spencer
2019	'Tol	Lando
2020	Love Lockdown	Fred
2023	Penduko	
2024	Topakk	Miguel
2026	Moonglow	Charlie

=== Web series ===
Year	Title	Role	Notes
2019–	Bagman	Benjo Malaya	Lead Cast

== Awards and nominations ==
Year	Work	Award	Category	Result	Ref.
2012	Maalaala Mo Kaya: "Bangka"	26th PMPC Star Awards for Television	Best New Male TV Personality	Won	
2012	Maalaala Mo Kaya: "Bangka"	26th PMPC Star Awards for Television	Best Single Performance by an Actor	Nominated	
2013	Dugong Buhay	27th PMPC Star Awards for Television	Best Drama Supporting Actor	Won	
2014	Maalaala Mo Kaya: "Dos Por Dos"	28th PMPC Star Awards for Television	Best Single Performance by an Actor	Won	
2015	Maalaala Mo Kaya: "Liham"	29th PMPC Star Awards for Television	Best Single Performance by an Actor	Nominated	
2016	FPJ's Ang Probinsyano	The PEP List Year 3	Best Supporting Actor	Won	
2016	FPJ's Ang Probinsyano	30th PMPC Star Awards for Television	Best Drama Supporting Actor	Won	
2018	Hanggang Saan	32nd PMPC Star Awards for Television	Best Drama Actor	Nominated	
2019	The General's Daughter	33rd PMPC Star Awards for Television	Best Drama Supporting Actor	Won	
2020	Bagman	3rd Asian Academy Creative Awards	Best Actor in a Leading Role	Won	
2023	Cattleya Killer	Asia Contents Awards & Global OTT Awards	Best Lead Actor	Nominated	
2023	Cattleya Killer	Asian Academy Creative Awards	Best Actor in a Leading Role	Won	
