= Mari Kaimo =

Filipino actor and journalist

- Born: Jose Mari Kaimo; January 21, 1960 (age 66); Metro Manila, Philippines
- Occupations: Journalist; news anchor; host; actor; voice-over artist
- Years active: 1982–present
- Known for: The 700 Club Asia
- Spouse: Enchang Kaimo (died 2026)
- Children: Khalil Kaimo

Jose Mari Kaimo (born January 21, 1960, in Manila, Philippines) is a veteran Filipino journalist, news anchor, host, television personality, actor, and voice-over artist.

== Career ==
Kaimo started as a news reporter at the height of the Ferdinand Marcos dictatorship. After the EDSA People Power Revolution, he anchored various newscasts on different TV stations including People's Television Network, GMA Network, ABS-CBN and its sister channel, Studio 23.

He co-hosted for Vilma Santos' show Vilma! in 1989, and some years later, shows such as The Global Filipino on TFC and The Correspondents on ABS-CBN. Kaimo also anchored News Central on Studio 23 from its inception in September 1998 until June 2007.

Since 2007, he is currently one of the regular hosts of the television program The 700 Club Asia, the Philippine franchise of the American program of the same name produced by CBN Asia.

Kaimo is also a voice-over artist, who narrated for some advertisements and AVPs.

He's been writing Christian apologetics posts in his blog site, ApoLogika in 2013.

Kaimo pursued an acting career in late 2016, where he mostly appeared in ABS-CBN and sometimes GMA.

== Filmography ==
=== As a news anchor and host ===
- News on 4
- (1992–1998) GMA Network News
- (1989) Vilma!
- (1991) 5th PMPC Star Awards for Television
- The Correspondents
- The Global Filipino
- (1998–2007) News Central
- (2000) Himig Handog sa Bayaning Pilipino
- (2007–present) The 700 Club Asia

=== As a film actor ===
- The Loved One (2026) as Ted

=== As a television actor ===
Year	Title	Role
2016	Be My Lady	Akiro Hiroshi
2017	The Better Half	Luisito Cabrera
2017	Maalaala Mo Kaya: Korona	Johnny Manahan
2017	Maalaala Mo Kaya: Salamin	Ben Hernandez
2017–18	Hanggang Saan	Judge Ignacio Tortuga
2018	Asintado	Sen. Arturo Galvez
2018	Maalaala Mo Kaya: Hapagkainan	Lolo
2018	Maalaala Mo Kaya: Manibela	Eddie
2019	Pepito Manaloto: Ang Tunay na Kuwento	Mr. Navales
2019	Kara Mia	Leon Burgos
2020	Love Thy Woman	Manny Tanchangco
2020	A Soldier's Heart	President of the Philippines
2023	The Iron Heart	Enrique "Supremo" Guerrero
2023	Tanikala: Senior Moment	Pepe Magtubol
2024	Pamilya Sagrado	

=== As a voice-over ===
- PruLife UK: “The Stubborn Man” advertisement (2014)
- Bangko Sentral: “New Money” advertisement series
- PhilDev USA (formerly the Ayala Foundation USA) advertisement/AVP
- Centrum Silver Advance: “Basketboys” (2017)
- Neurobion: "True Heroes" (2020)
