= PMPC Star Award for Best Male & Female TV Host =

The PMPC Star Award for Best Male & Female TV Host is given to the best male & female TV host in musical & variety shows.

== Winners ==
=== Male TV Hosts ===
1987:

1988: German Moreno (GMA Supershow / GMA 7)

1989: German Moreno (GMA Supershow / GMA 7)

1990: Vic Sotto (Eat Bulaga / ABS-CBN 2)

1991: German Moreno (GMA Supershow / GMA 7)

1992: Ariel Ureta (R.S.V.P. / GMA 7)

1993: German Moreno (GMA Supershow / GMA 7)

1994: German Moreno (GMA Supershow / GMA 7)

1995: German Moreno (GMA Supershow / GMA 7)

1996:

1997: Vic Sotto (Eat Bulaga / GMA-7)

1998: Vic Sotto (Eat Bulaga / GMA-7)

1999: Martin Nievera (ASAP / ABS-CBN 2)

2000: Janno Gibbs (S.O.P., GMA 7)

2001: Joey de Leon (Eat Bulaga / GMA-7)

2002: Vic Sotto (Eat Bulaga / GMA-7)

2003: Vic Sotto (Eat Bulaga / GMA-7)

2004: Ogie Alcasid (SOP Rules / GMA 7)

2005: Willie Revillame (Wowowee / ABS-CBN 2)

2006: Luis Manzano (ASAP '06 / ABS-CBN 2)

2007: Willie Revillame (Wowowee / ABS-CBN 2)

2008: Vic Sotto (Eat Bulaga / GMA-7)

2009: Luis Manzano (ASAP '09 / ABS-CBN 2)

2010: Joey de Leon (Eat Bulaga / GMA-7)

2011: Allan K (Eat Bulaga / GMA-7)

2012: Billy Crawford (ASAP 2012 / ABS-CBN 2)

2013: Billy Crawford (It's Showtime / ABS-CBN 2)

2014: Vice Ganda (It's Showtime / ABS-CBN 2)

2015: Vice Ganda (It's Showtime / ABS-CBN 2)

2016: Luis Manzano (ASAP / ABS-CBN 2)

2017: Vice Ganda (It's Showtime / ABS-CBN 2)

2018: Alden Richards (Eat Bulaga / GMA-7)

2019: Vice Ganda (It's Showtime / ABS-CBN 2)

2020: Vice Ganda (It's Showtime / ABS-CBN 2)

2021: Paolo Ballesteros (Eat Bulaga / GMA 7)

2023: Paolo Ballesteros (E.A.T. / TV5) & Robi Domingo (ASAP Natin 'To / A2Z 11, TV5)

2024: Vic Sotto (Eat Bulaga / RPTV 9, TV5)

=== Female TV Hosts ===
1987: Nora Aunor (Superstar /RPN 9) & Vilma Santos (Vilma / GMA 7) [tied]

1988: Vilma Santos (Vilma / GMA 7)

1989:

1990: Sharon Cuneta (The Sharon Cuneta Show / ABS-CBN 2)

1991: Tina Revilla (Lunch Date / GMA 7)

1992: Pops Fernandez (P.O.P.S.: Pops On Primetime Saturday / ABC 5)

1993: Sharon Cuneta (The Sharon Cuneta Show / ABS-CBN 2)

1994: Sharon Cuneta (The Sharon Cuneta Show / ABS-CBN 2)

1995: Sharon Cuneta (The Sharon Cuneta Show / ABS-CBN 2)

1996: Sharon Cuneta (The Sharon Cuneta Show / ABS-CBN 2)

1997:

1998: Pops Fernandez (A.S.A.P./ABS-CBN 2)

1999: Amy Perez (Magandang Tanghali Bayan/ABS-CBN 2) & Pops Fernandez (A.S.A.P./ABS-CBN 2)

2000: Pops Fernandez (A.S.A.P./ABS-CBN 2)

2001: Pops Fernandez (A.S.A.P./ABS-CBN 2)

2002: Pops Fernandez (A.S.A.P./ABS-CBN 2)

2003: Claudine Barretto (ASAP Mania / ABS-CBN 2)

2004: Zsa Zsa Padilla (ASAP Mania / ABS-CBN 2)

2005: Regine Velasquez (SOP Rules / GMA-7)

2006: Toni Gonzaga (ASAP '06 / ABS-CBN 2)

2007: Janelle Jamer (Wowowee / ABS-CBN 2)

2008: Valerie Concepcion (Wowowee / ABS-CBN 2)

2009: Valerie Concepcion (Wowowee / ABS-CBN 2)

2010: Toni Gonzaga (ASAP XV / ABS-CBN 2)

2011: Toni Gonzaga (ASAP Rocks / ABS-CBN 2)

2012: Toni Gonzaga (ASAP 2012 / ABS-CBN 2)

2013: Anne Curtis (It's Showtime / ABS-CBN 2)

2014: Toni Gonzaga (ASAP 19 / ABS-CBN 2)

2015: Anne Curtis (It's Showtime / ABS-CBN 2)

2016: Anne Curtis (It's Showtime / ABS-CBN 2)

2017: Marian Rivera (Sunday PinaSaya / GMA 7)

2018: Maine Mendoza (Eat Bulaga / GMA 7)

2019: Anne Curtis (It's Showtime / ABS-CBN 2)

2020: Amy Perez (It's Showtime / ABS-CBN 2)

2021: Kim Chiu (It's Showtime / A2Z 11)

2023: Kim Chiu (It's Showtime / A2Z 11, GTV 27)

2024: Anne Curtis (It's Showtime / A2Z 11, All TV 2, GMA 7, GTV 27)
