= Ading Fernando Lifetime Achievement Award =

Philippine television personality award

The Ading Fernando Lifetime Achievement Award is an honorary Star Award for Television bestowed by the Philippine Movie Press Club to recognize the long-time television personalities including entertainers, actors, hosts, producers and directors for lifetime achievement within the television industry in the Philippines.

== Honorees ==
1987: Pilita Corrales

1988: Chichay and Dominic Salustiano

1989:

1990:

1991: Armida Siguion-Reyna

1992: Nida Blanca and Helen Vela (Posthumous Award)

1993: German Moreno

1994:

1995:

1996: Loida Viriña

1997: Sylvia La Torre

1998: Vilma Santos

1999:

2000: Tito Sotto, Vic Sotto and Joey de Leon

2001: Nora Aunor

2002: Inday Badiday

2003: Luz Valdez

2004: Not given

2005: Not given

2006: Eddie Mercado (Posthumous Award)

2007: Charo Santos-Concio

2008: Rosa Rosal

2009: Johnny Manahan

2010: Antonio Tuviera

2011: Susan Roces

2012: Gloria Romero

2013: Kitchie Benedicto

2014: Nova Villa

2015: Coney Reyes

2016: Maricel Soriano

2017: Vic Sotto

2018: Herbert Bautista

2019: Kris Aquino

2020: Boy Abunda

2021: Connie Angeles

2023: Geleen Eugenio, Malou Choa Fagar, Caridad Sanchez and Ariel Ureta

2024: Janice de Belen
