= Probe (Philippine TV program) =

Philippine television documentary show

- Title card
- Also known as: Probe; The Probe Team; The Probe Team Documentaries
- Genre: Documentary
- Presented by: Cheche Lazaro; Maria Ressa; Luchi Cruz-Valdes; Bernadette Sembrano; Howie Severino; Robert Alejandro; Adrian Ayalin; Hera Sanchez; Akiko Thomson; Pinky Webb
- Theme music composer: Reev Robledo
- Opening theme: "Probe Profiles theme"
- Country of origin: Philippines
- Original languages: English (1987–99); Tagalog (1999–2010)

Production
- Camera setup: Multiple-camera setup
- Running time: 42 minutes
- Production companies: Probe Productions, Inc.; ABS-CBN News and Current Affairs (1987–88; 2005–10); GMA News and Public Affairs (1988–2003); ABC News and Public Affairs (2004–05)

Original release
- Network: ABS-CBN
- Release: March 6 – December 18, 1987
- Network: GMA Network
- Release: May 20, 1988 – November 25, 2003
- Network: ABC
- Release: May 15, 2004 – April 16, 2005
- Network: ABS-CBN
- Release: August 17, 2005 – June 30, 2010

Probe Profiles (formerly known as Probe, The Probe Team and The Probe Team Documentaries) is a Philippine documentary television show broadcast by ABS-CBN, GMA Network and ABC. Originally hosted by Cheche Lazaro, Maria Ressa and Luchi Cruz-Valdes, it premiered on March 6, 1987. After nine months, it moved to GMA Network. The show concluded on June 30, 2010.

== Hosts ==
Hosts

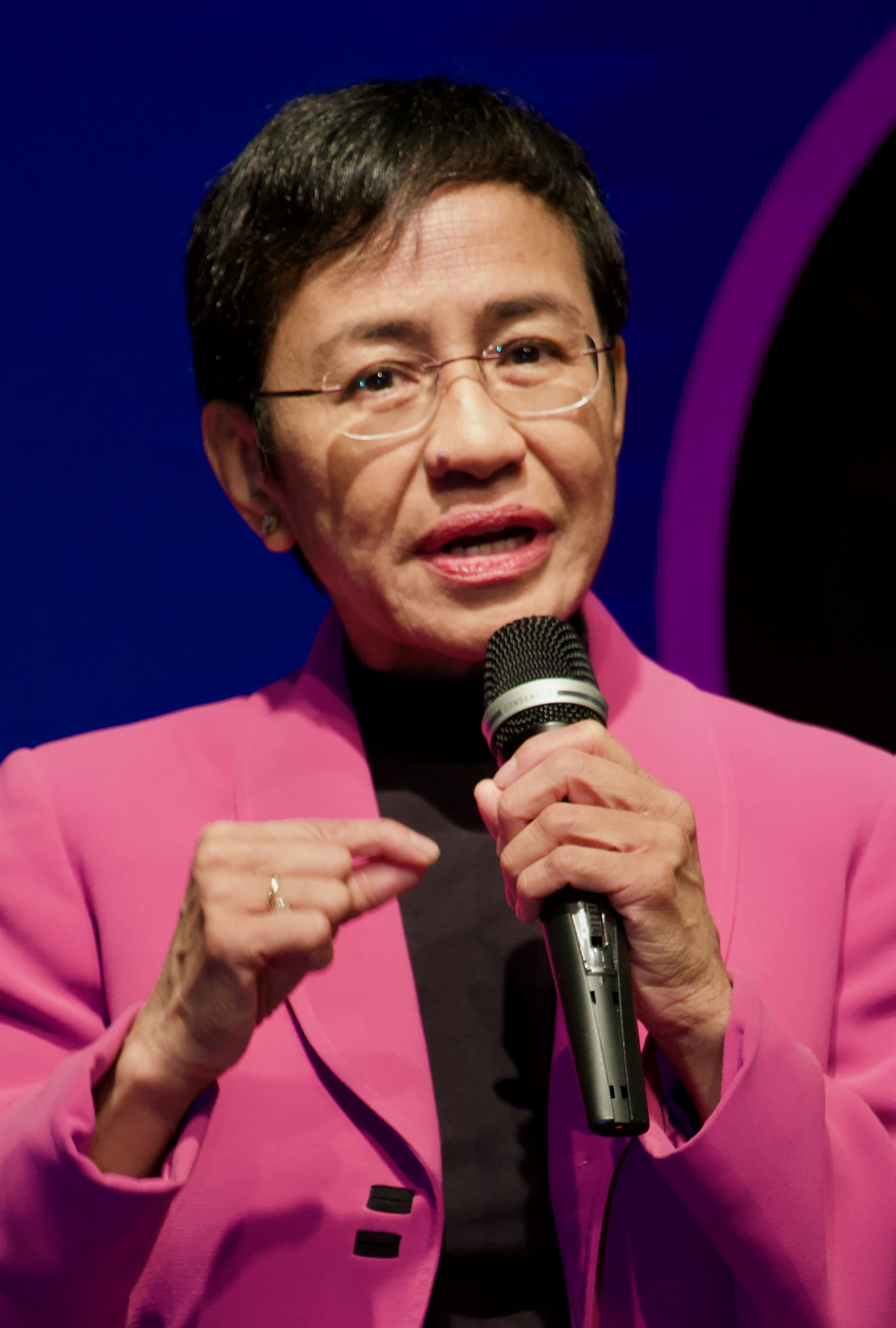
Maria Ressa

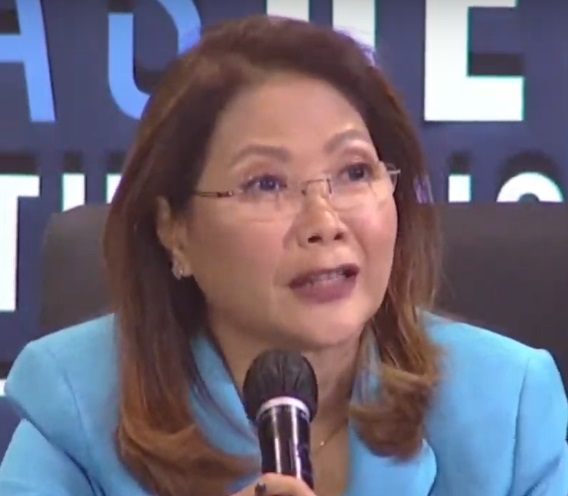
Luchi Cruz-Valdes

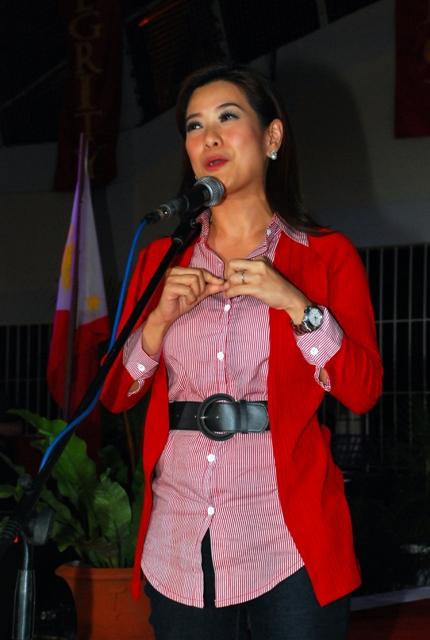
Bernadette Sembrano

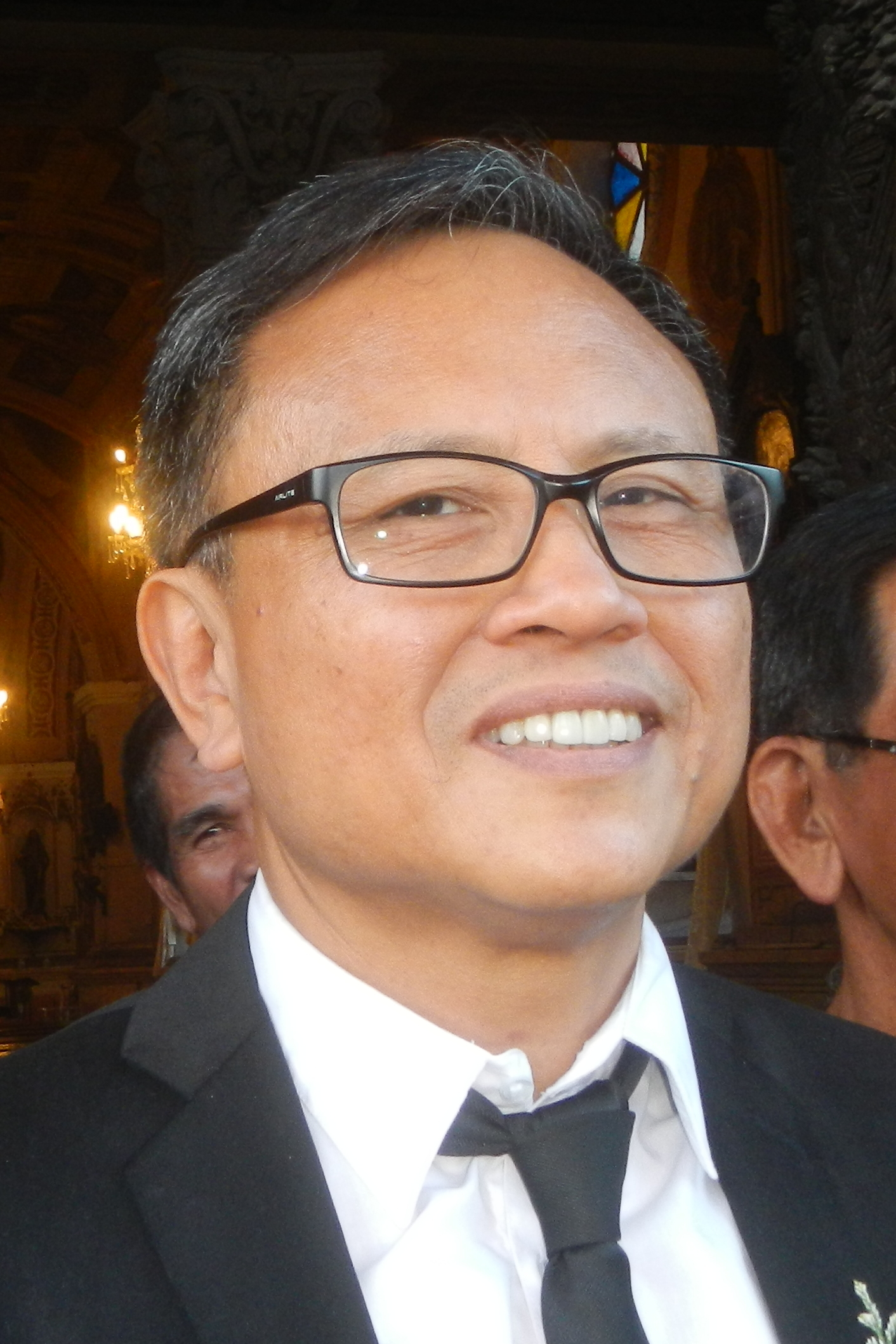
Howie Severino

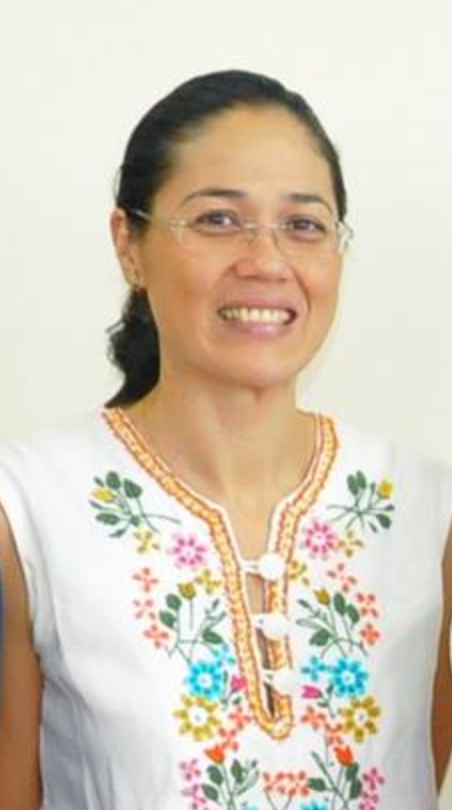
Akiko Thomson

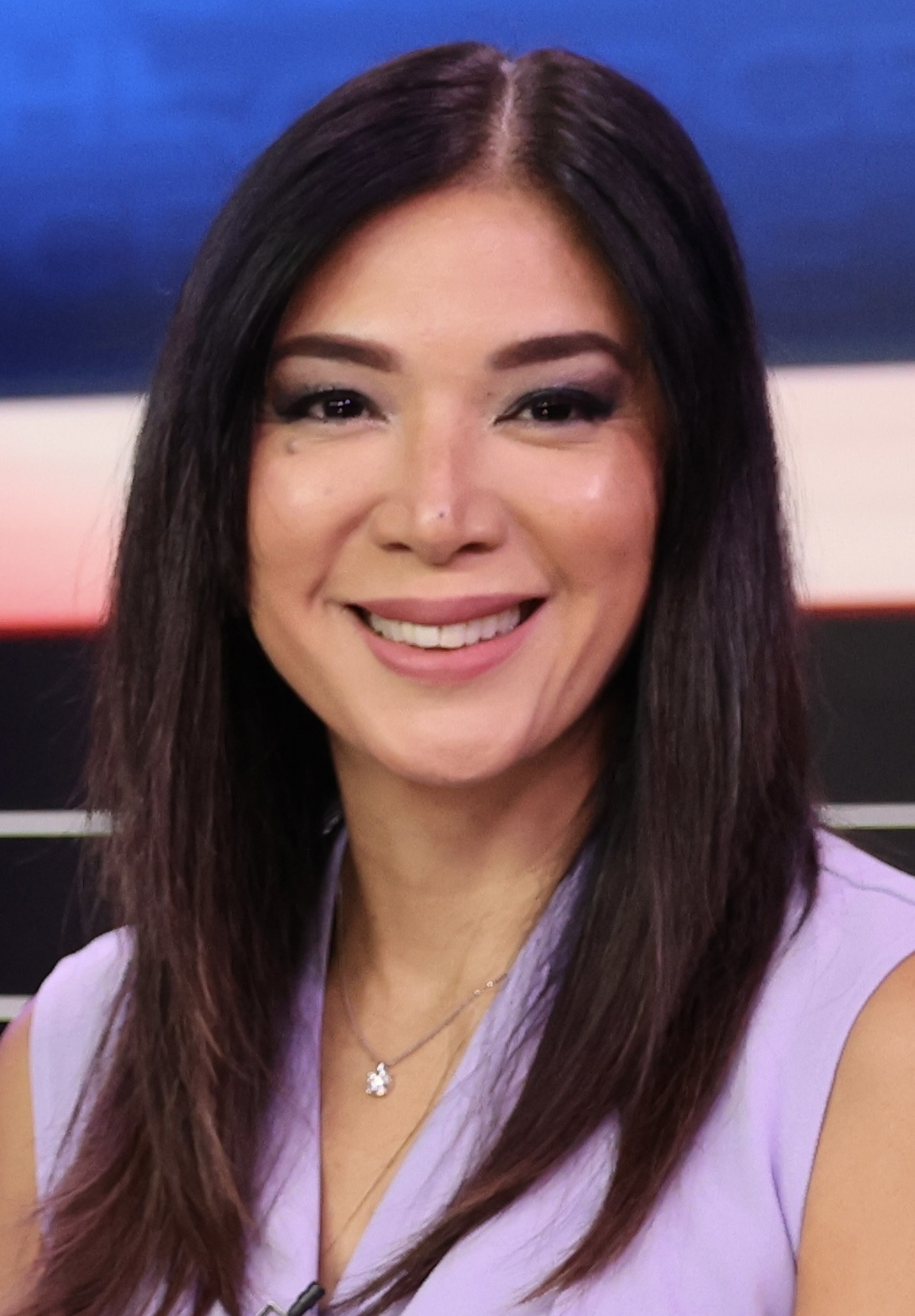
Pinky Webb

- Cheche Lazaro
- Maria Ressa
- Luchi Cruz-Valdes
- Bernadette Sembrano
- Howie Severino
- Robert Alejandro
- Adrian Ayalin
- Hera Sanchez
- Akiko Thomson
- Pinky Webb

== Accolades ==
Accolades received by The Probe Team
Year	Awards	Category	Recipient	Result	Ref.
2000	14th PMPC Star Awards for Television	Best Magazine Show	The Probe Team	Won	
2000	14th PMPC Star Awards for Television	Best Magazine Show Host	Cheche Lazaro	Won	
2001	15th PMPC Star Awards for Television	Best Magazine Show	The Probe Team	Won	
2001	15th PMPC Star Awards for Television	Best Magazine Show Host	Cheche Lazaro	Won	
2002	16th PMPC Star Awards for Television	Longest-running TV shows	The Probe Team	Won	
2003	17th PMPC Star Awards for Television	Best Magazine Show	The Probe Team	Nominated	
2003	17th PMPC Star Awards for Television	Best Magazine Show Host	Cheche Lazaro	Nominated	

Accolades received by The Probe Team Documentaries
Year	Awards	Category	Recipient	Result	Ref.
2004	18th PMPC Star Awards for Television	Best Documentary Program	The Probe Team Documentaries	Won	
2004	18th PMPC Star Awards for Television	Best Documentary Program Host	Cheche Lazaro	Won	
2005	19th PMPC Star Awards for Television	Best Documentary Program	The Probe Team Documentaries	Nominated	
2005	19th PMPC Star Awards for Television	Best Documentary Program Host	Cheche Lazaro	Nominated	

Accolades received by Probe
Year	Awards	Category	Recipient	Result	Ref.
2007	21st PMPC Star Awards for Television	Best Magazine Show	Probe	Nominated	
2007	21st PMPC Star Awards for Television	Best Magazine Show Host	Cheche Lazaro	Nominated	
2008	22nd PMPC Star Awards for Television	Best Documentary Program	Probe	Nominated	
2008	22nd PMPC Star Awards for Television	Best Documentary Program Host	Robert Alejandro, Adrian Ayalin, Cheche Lazaro, Hera Sanchez, Akiko Thomson, Pinky Webb	Nominated	

Accolades received by Probe Profiles
Year	Awards	Category	Recipient	Result	Ref.
2009	23rd PMPC Star Awards for Television	Best Public Affairs Program	Probe Profiles	Won	
2009	23rd PMPC Star Awards for Television	Best Public Affairs Program Host	Cheche Lazaro	Won	
2010	24th PMPC Star Awards for Television	Best Magazine Show	Probe Profiles	Nominated	
2010	24th PMPC Star Awards for Television	Best Magazine Show Host	Cheche Lazaro	Nominated	

== Controversies ==
Due to a controversy surrounding one of its features which involved a Philippine government official close to former President Gloria Macapagal Arroyo in 2003, its contract with GMA Network was terminated. The show moved to ABC, and renamed the show as The Probe Team Documentaries.

On May 8, 2009, Ella Valencerina of GSIS alleged that Cheche Lazaro, recorded and aired a phone interview with her without a consent. The phone conversation appeared on the November 12, 2008 episode of Probe, featuring the agency's alleged failure to deliver on its commitment to provide financial support to retired public school teachers. Pasay City Metropolitan Trial Court acquitted Lazaro on August 17, 2010, citing on lack of evidence.
