= Cheche Lazaro =

American-born Filipino journalist

- Born: Cecilia "Cheche" Aldaba Lim; September 8, 1945 (age 81); Los Angeles, California, U.S
- Education: University of the Philippines Diliman; University of Michigan
- Occupations: Journalist; Media Practitioner
- Years active: 1986–present

Cecilia "Cheche" Aldaba Lim-Lázaro (born September 8, 1945), is a Filipino broadcast journalist and the founding President of Probe Productions Inc. and Probe Media Foundation.

== Profile ==
The eldest of six children, Cecilia "Cheche" Aldaba Lim, was born to Luis Lim, an engineer, and Estefania Aldaba-Lim, a psychologist and former secretary of the Department of Social Welfare and Development. Lazaro's paternal grandfather is the renowned World War II hero, and first Filipino to graduate from the United States Military Academy Gen. Vicente Lim. She was born September 8, 1945, in the US but decided to give up her US citizenship and chose to be legally Filipina when she applied for a scholarship for a master's degree in radio and television from the University of Michigan.

In 1966, she obtained her Bachelor of Arts degree in speech and drama at the University of the Philippines Diliman. She continued her studies at the University of Michigan and obtained her master's degree in radio-television in 1968. She has been married to Filipino businessman Delfin Lázaro for more than 40 years, and together they have two children, Lisa and Carlos, and a grandchild, Jack.

== Career ==
Lázaro began her career working as a reporter for ABS-CBN. Between July 1986 and December 1987, she became director and manager of the network's Public Affairs department. This allowed her to be appointed team leader and reporter for the network's coverage of President Corazon C. Aquino's visit to Singapore and Indonesia.

Lázaro soon left her position at ABS-CBN in 1988 to create her own production company, Probe Productions, with the help of fellow journalists Luchi Cruz-Valdez and Maria Ressa. This led her to produce several documentary programs such as 5 and Up for ABC (later TV5), The Probe Team, I-Witness and Cheche Lazaro Presents for GMA Network, which eventually became her home network.

There, she was able to produce award-winning documentaries, including one involving the MV Doña Paz maritime disaster. The relationship with the network, however, was strained in 2003 when GMA refused to air a Probe segment about a lifestyle check on PAGCOR Chair Efraim Genuino. The network said that the story was a half-baked job that would unjustly ruin the subject's reputation; Lázaro saw it as censorship. The rift was played out in media, and after 16 years of good relations with GMA, the network pre-terminated the contract of Probe.

Despite this setback, Lázaro returned to the limelight when Probe began reairing on ABC in June 2004. After a year's stay, she decided to go back in 2005 to her channel of origin, ABS-CBN. Between 1992 and 1995, Lázaro was also chairperson of the broadcast department at the University of the Philippines Diliman.

Lázaro as a host has obtained various awards from Philippine award-giving bodies. She has been awarded 'Best News Magazine show host' nine times by the Star Awards. The Probe Team, the first Filipino investigative news magazine for television, has won both local and international recognition. It program received Gawad CCP Para sa Telebisyon "10 Best TV Programs of the Philippine Television" ten times.

Lázaro's last programme with the Probe Production team is Probe Profiles. Their last episode was aired July 1, 2010, and featured the story of President Benigno Aquino III on his candidacy and rise to power that year.

In 2018, Lázaro joined One News (owned by TV5 Network, replacing Bloomberg TV Philippines) as a host for Convo after she left Probe for 8 years and Cheche Lazaro Presents for 4 years.

== Notable awards ==
Year	Award giving body	Category	Nominated work	Results
1993	Golden Dove Awards	Best Female Public Affairs Host	The Probe Team	Won
2000	Catholic Mass Media Awards (CMMA)	Hall of Fame Inductee	The Probe Team	Won
2001	Golden Dove Awards	Best Female Public Affairs Host	I-Witness	Won
2001	Golden Dove Awards	Best Program Promoting Culture and the Arts	Cheche Lazaro Presents	Won
2001	New York Festival	Silver World Medal	Television Documentary and Information Program on Social Issues/Current Events	Won
2003	Malolos Heritage Foundation	Most Outstanding Daughter of Malolos	Accomplishments in the field of broadcasting	Won
2003	Provincial government of Bulacan	Dangal ng Lipi Award Para sa Sining at Kultura	—N/a	Won
2007	University of the Philippines	Gawad Plaridel Award	Outstanding contributions to the local television industry and broadcast journalism	Won
2010	Eastwood City Walk Of Fame	Celebrity Inductee	—N/a	Won
2010	Philippine Movie Press Club	Excellence in Broadcasting	Outstanding contributions to the local television industry and broadcast journalism	Won
2015	Golden Screen TV Awards	Helen Vela Lifetime Achievement Award	—N/a	Won
