= List of programs broadcast by ABS-CBN =

The following is a list of original programming previously broadcast by ABS-CBN, a defunct free-to-air commercial broadcasting television network in the Philippines, owned by ABS-CBN Corporation. It was headquartered on the ABS-CBN Broadcasting Center in Diliman, Quezon City.

On May 5, 2020, ABS-CBN was issued with a cease and desist order from the National Telecommunications Commission (NTC) and Solicitor General Jose Calida. The franchise license expired on May 4, and a day later, ABS-CBN officially signed off in the evening. On July 10, 2020, the House Committee on Legislative Franchises of the 18th Congress has denied the renewal of ABS-CBN's broadcasting franchise. As a result, the network forced to cease the operations of numerous divisions and laid off its workers.

After shutting down its terrestrial and regional stations, ABS-CBN started distributing its own programs on Kapamilya Channel (a cable channel), Kapamilya Online Live (a web-based channel), and A2Z (a free-to-air channel in partnership with ZOE Broadcasting Network). The corporation has also entered into an acquired agreement with multiple networks to broadcast ABS-CBN programs, including All TV, GMA Network, and TV5 (from 2021 until 2026, 2026 to present).

== Former original programming ==
Note: Titles are listed in alphabetical order, followed by the year of debut in parentheses.

=== News ===
- Kabayan (2010, 2020)
- Nescafé Morning News (1987–1989)
- News Patrol (2005–2020)
- Todo Balita (2008–2010)
- TV Patrol (1987–2020)
- TV Patrol Weekend (2004–2020)
- Umagang Kay Ganda (2007–2020)
- The World Tonight (1966–1972, 1986–1999; Weekend Edition, 1987–1996)

=== Current affairs ===
- Ako Ang Simula (2011–2013)
- Compañero y Compañera (1997–1998)
- Damayan (1969–1972)
- Dong Puno Live (1995–2000, 2003–2005)
- Hoy Gising! (1992–2001)
- Hoy Gising! Kapamilya (2004–2005)
- Kontrobersyal (2003–2006)
- Krusada (2010–2013)
- Kulilits (2009–2010)
- Nagmamahal, Kapamilya (2006–2007)
- SNN: Showbiz News Ngayon (2009–2011)
- The Bottomline with Boy Abunda (2009–2020)
- The Inside Story (1990–1998)
- Usapang Business (1996–1999)

News magazine

- Balitang K (1996–2001)
- F! (1999–2003)
- Failon Ngayon (2009–2020)
- G Diaries (2017–2020)
- Kuha Mo! (2019–2020)
- Magandang Gabi... Bayan (1988–2005)
- Pareng Partners (2018–2019)
- PEP (People, Events and Places) Talk (1986–1990)
- Rated K (2004–2020)
- Sports Unlimited (1997–2020)
- Tatak Pilipino (1990–1995)
- Usapang Business (1996–1999)
- Wonder Mom (2008–2009)

Documentary

- Probe (1987–1988; 2005–2009)
- S.O.C.O.: Scene of the Crime Operatives (2005–2020)
- The Correspondents (1998–2010)
- Trip na Trip (2006–2011)
- XXX: Exklusibong, Explosibong, Exposé (2006–2013)

=== Drama ===
==== Anthology ====
- Bayani (1995–2001)
- Calvento Files (1995–1998)
- Coney Reyes on Camera (1989–1998)
- Family Theater (1960–1972)
- Flames (1996–2002)
- Give Love on Christmas (2014–2015)
- I Am KC (2008), starring KC Concepcion. (Aired from March 29, 2008, to April 19, 2008)
- Ipaglaban Mo! (2014–2020)
- Judy Ann Drama Special (1999–2001)
- Kapag May Katwiran, Ipaglaban Mo! (1992–1999)
- Love Spell (2006–2008)
- Maalaala Mo Kaya (1991–2020)
- The Maricel Drama Special (1989–1997)
- Maricel Regal Drama Special (1987–1989)
- Nagmamahal, Kapamilya (2006–2007)
- Sa Sandaling Kailangan Mo Ako (1998–1999)
- Star Drama Presents (1993–2001)
- Star Magic Presents (2006–2008)
- Your Song (2006–2011)
- Pasión de Amor (2015–2016)

==== Fantasy and horror ====
- !Oka Tokat (1997–2002)
- Agimat: Ang Mga Alamat ni Ramon Revilla (2009–2011)
- Hiwaga sa Bahay na Bato (1963)
- Hiwaga ng Kambat (2019)
- Komiks Presents: (2006–2009)
  - Kapitan Boom (2008)
  - Varga (2008)
  - Tiny Tony (2008)
  - Dragonna (2008–2009)
  - Flash Bomba (2009)
  - Nasaan Ka Maruja? (2009)
- Nginiig (2004–2006)
- Oka2kat (2012)
- Parasite Island (2019)
- Super Inggo 1.5: Ang Bagong Bangis (2007)
- The Haunted (2019–2020)
- Volta (2008)
- Wansapanataym (1997–2005, 2010–2019)

==== Science fiction ====
- Mga Bayani sa Kalawakan (1962)
- E-Boy (2012)
- Kokey (2007)
- Kokey at Ako (2010)

=== Comedy ===
- Aalog-Alog (2006–2007)
- Abangan Ang Susunod Na Kabanata (1991–1997)
- Ang Tanging Ina (2003–2005)
- Ang TV (1992–1997)
- Arriba, Arriba! (2000–2003)
- Attagirl (2001–2002)
- Banana Sundae (2015–2020)
- Bida si Mister, Bida si Misis (2002–2005)
- Bora: Sons of the Beach (2005–2006)
- Chika Chika Chicks (1987–1991)
- Dok Ricky, Pedia (2017–2020)
- Eto Na Ang Susunod Na Kabanata (2001)
- George and Cecil (2009–2010)
- Goin' Bananas (1987–1991)
- Goin' Bulilit (2005–2019)
- Gudtaym (2006)
- Home Along Da Riles (1992–2003)
- Home Sweetie Home (2014–2020)
- Kaya ni Mister, Kaya ni Misis (1997–2001)
- Laugh Out Loud (2010–2011)
- Luv U (2012–2016)
- M3: Malay Mo Ma-develop (2010)
- Mary D' Potter (2001–2002)
- My Juan and Only (2005–2006)
- OK Fine, 'To Ang Gusto Nyo! (2004–2006)
- Okay Ka, Fairy Ko! (1989–1995)
- Oki Doki Doc (1993–2000)
- Palibhasa Lalake (1987–1998)
- Parekoy (2009)
- Pwedeng Pwede (1999–2001)
- Quizon Avenue (2005–2006)
- Richard Loves Lucy: Sweetie Pie, Honey Pie (1998–2001)
- Super Laff-In (1969–1972, 1996–1999)
- Tarajing Potpot (1999–2000)
- That's My Doc (2007–2008)
- Toda Max (2011–2013)
- Whattamen (2001–2004)
- Yes, Yes Show! (2004–2006)

=== Informative ===
- At Home Ka Dito (2004–2007)
- Del Monte Kitchenomics (1989–1995, 2000–2004)
- F! (1999–2003)
- Hiraya Manawari (1995–2003)
- Knowledge Power (1998–2004)
- Kumikitang Kabuhayan (2003–2005)
- Makuha Ka sa Tikim (2005–2006)
- Matanglawin (2008–2020)
- Salamat Dok (2004–2020)
- Sine'skwela (1994–2004, 2009–2010)
- Swak na Swak (2006–2020)

=== Educational; kid-oriented ===
- ATBP: Awit, Titik at Bilang na Pambata (1994–1998)
- Art Jam (2004–2006)
- Basta Sports (2006)
- Batibot (1991–1994)
- Epol/Apple (1999–2004)
- Jollitown (2011–2012)
- Kulilits (2009–2010)
- Math-Tinik (1997–2004, 2009–2010)
- Sine'skwela (1994–2004, 2009–2010)

=== Reality ===
- Born Diva (2004–2005)
- Dance Kids (2015–2016)
- Gaby's Xtraordinary Files (2008)
- I Can Do That (2017)
- I Can See Your Voice (2017–2020)
- I Dare You (2011, 2013)
- I Do (2014)
- I Love OPM (2016)
- Idol Philippines (2019)
- Junior MasterChef Pinoy Edition (2011–2012)
- Little Big Shots (2017)
- Little Big Star (2005–2007)
- Little Big Superstar (2007)
- MasterChef Pinoy Edition (2012–2013)
- Pilipinas Got Talent (2010–2018)
- Pinoy Big Brother (2005–2019)
- Pinoy Boyband Superstar (2016)
- Pinoy Dream Academy (2006–2008)
- Pinoy Fear Factor (2008–2009)
- Pinoy Mano Mano: Celebrity Boxing Challenge (2007–2008)
- Promil Pre-School I Shine Talent Camp TV (2012–2014)
- Qpids (2005)
- Search for the Star in a Million (2005–2006)
- Star Circle Quest (2004–2011)
- Star in a Million (2003–2004)
- Star Power: The Next Female Pop Superstar (2010–2011)
- StarDance (2005)
- Tawag ng Tanghalan (1958–1972, 1987–1988)
- The Biggest Loser Pinoy Edition (2011, 2014)
- The Voice Kids (2014–2019)
- The Voice of the Philippines (2013–2015)
- The Voice Teens (2017–2020)
- U Can Dance (2006–2007)
- We Love OPM (2016)
- World of Dance Philippines (2019)
- The X Factor Philippines (2012)
- Your Face Sounds Familiar (2015–2018)

=== Game ===
- 1 vs. 100 (2007–2008)
- Bet on Your Baby (2013–2015, 2017)
- Celebrity Playtime (2015–2016)
- Family Feud (2016–2017)
- Family Kuarta o Kahon (1962–1972)
- Game Ka Na Ba? (2001–2002)
- Game ng Bayan (2016)
- Games Uplate Live (2006–2009)
- Kapamilya, Deal or No Deal (2006–2009, 2012–2013, 2015–2016)
- Minute to Win It (2013–2014, 2016–2017, 2019)
- Pepsi Number Fever (1992)
- Panahon Ko 'to!: Ang Game Show ng Buhay Ko (2010)
- Pinoy Bingo Night (2009)
- The Price is Right (2011)
- The Singing Bee (2008–2010, 2013–2015)
- Twist and Shout (2010)
- Wheel of Fortune (2008)

=== Talk ===
- Aquino & Abunda Tonight (2014–2015)
- Boy & Kris (2007–2009)
- Cristy Per Minute (1995–2000)
- EK Channel (2004–2005)
- Entertainment Konek (2005–2006)
- Entertainment Live (2007–2012)
- Gandang Gabi, Vice! (2011–2020)
- Good Morning, Kris (2004)
- Homeboy (2005–2007)
- Kris TV (2011–2016)
- Magandang Buhay (2016–2020)
- Martin After Dark (1993–1998)
- Martin Late @ Night (2013)
- Martin Late at Nite (1998–2003)
- Morning Girls with Kris and Korina (2003–2004)
- Morning Star (2004–2005)
- Oh No! It's Johnny! (1987–1999)
- Ruffa & Ai (2009)
- S2: Showbiz Sabado (2003)
- Sharon (1998–2004, 2006–2010)
- Showbiz Inside Report (2012–2013)
- Showbiz Lingo (later became "Showbiz Lingo Plus" 1992–1999)
- Simply KC (2010)
- Talk TV (2001–2002)
- Teysi ng Tahanan (1991–1997)
- The Buzz (1999–2015)
- Today with Kris Aquino (1996–2001)
- Tonight with Boy Abunda (2015–2020)
- Y Speak (2004–2005)

=== Variety/musical ===
- 'Sang Linggo nAPO Sila (1995–1998)
- ASAP (1995–2020)
- Caltex Star Caravan
- Coke Studio Philippines (2018–2019)
- Eat Bulaga! (1989–1995)
- Happy Yipee Yehey! (2011–2012)
- In da Loop (2012)
- It's Showtime (2009–2020)
- MTB: Ang Saya Saya (2004–2005)
- Music Uplate Live (2010–2011)
- Pilipinas Win Na Win (2010)
- Ryan Ryan Musikahan (1988–1995)
- Sa Linggo nAPO Sila (1989–1995)
- Sarah G. Live (2012–2013)
- Sharon (1998–2004, 2006–2010)
- Student Canteen (1958–1965)
- The Sharon Cuneta Show (1988–1997)
- Wowowee (2005–2006, 2006–2010)

=== Youth-oriented ===
- Ang TV (1992–1997)
- Berks (2002–2004)
- Buttercup (2003–2004)
- Flames (1996–2002)
- G-mik (1999–2002)
- Gimik (1996–1999)
- Goin' Bulilit (2005–2019)
- Gokada Go! (2007)
- Good Vibes (2011)
- Growing Up (2011–2012)
- Let's Go! (2006–2007)
- SCQ Reload (2004–2005)
- Shoutout! (2010–2011)
- Star Magic Presents: Astigs (2008)
- Tabing Ilog (1999–2003)

=== Religious ===
- Ang Iglesia ni Cristo (1990–2003)
- Cathedral of Praise with David Sumrall (1986–1992)
- Family Rosary Crusade (1987–2003)

=== Others ===
- Asia Business News (1994–1996)
- O Shopping (2013–2020)

== Former regional programming ==
- Agri Tayo Dito (2012–2018)
- Bida Kapampangan (2011–2017)
- Kapalaran (2002–2004)
- Kapamilya, Mas Winner Ka! (formerly known as Kapamilya Winner Ka!; 2007–2018)
- Mag TV Na (2008–2018)
  - Mag TV Na, De Aton Este!
  - Mag TV Na! Southern Mindanao
- PAL Newscast – ABS-CBN Cebu

== Acquired programming ==
=== Anime and Tokusatsu ===
- Adventures of Tom Sawyer (1997; re-aired 2014–2015)
- Air Gear (2007)
- Akazukin Chacha (1999)
- Alice Academy (2007)
- Ang Alamat ni Snow White
- Ang Mahiwagang Kuwintas
- Ang Pangarap ni Cosette: Les Misérables (2009)
- Angie Girl (2000; re-aired 2003, 2008)
- Angelic Layer (2005)
- Anne of Green Gables (1998)
- Astro Boy (2003–2004)
- B't X (1997–1998)
- Battle Fever J (1987–1988)
- Beet the Vandel Buster (2006–2007)
- Beyblade (2002–2003)
- Bikkuriman 2000
- Bioman (1990–1991)
- Blue Blink (1999)
- Blue Dragon (2009–2013)
- Bubu Chacha (2002)
- Busou Renkin (2010)
- Capeta (2007)
- Cardcaptor Sakura (2001–2002)
- Crush Gear Turbo (2003)
- Cedie, Ang Munting Prinsipe (1992; re-aired 2003, 2007, 2015)
- Charlotte (1998)
- Cinderella (1999)
- Cooking Master Boy (2003; re-aired 2007)
- CRO
- Cuore
- Cyborg 009 (2004)
- D.I.C.E. (2006)
- Daimos (1989–1990)
- Dear Boys (2004)
- Denziman (1988–1989)
- Digimon Adventure 02
- Digimon Adventures (2000–2001)
- Digimon Frontier
- Digimon Savers
- Digimon Tamers
- Digimon Xros Wars (2014)
- Dinosaur King (2012)
- Dog of Flanders: My Patrasche (1992–1993; re-aired 2015)
- Duel Masters (2004)
- El Hazard The Mysterious World (The Wonderers) (2001)
- Eureka Seven (2007)
- Eyeshield 21 (2007–2011)
- Fantastic Children (2008)
- Final Fantasy: Unlimited (2003)
- Fruits Basket (2004)
- G-Force
- Gash Bell! (2012)
- Gate Keepers (2005)
- Georgie (1998)
- Get Backers (2004–2005)
- Gin Tama (2010–2013)
- Gingaman (2001–2002)
- GoGo V (2002–2003)
- Goggle V (1987–1991)
- Gundam Seed (2004–2006)
- Gundam Seed Destiny (2007)
- Haikyu!! (2015)
- Hana Yori Dango (1996–1997; re-aired 2010)
- Heavy Gear
- Heidi (1997)
- Heroman (2012)
- His and Her Circumstances (2005)
- Hitman Reborn! (2009–2011)
- Huck Finn
- Ie Naki Ko (subtitled Remi)
- Inuyasha (2002)
- Inazuma Eleven (season 1) (2011–2012; re-aired 2013) (on GMA Network)
- Isami (1999)
- Jackie (1999)
- Jenny (2002)
- Jester, the Adventurer (2000)
- Judie Abott (2002; re-aired 2007)
- Kiba (2009)
- Kiteretsu (1989–1991)
- Koseidon (1991–1998)
- Kuroko's Basketball (2013–2014)
- Lady Lady (2003–2004)
- Laserion (1987)
- Law of Ueki (2007)
- Little Women
- Little Women II
- Lost Universe (1999)
- Machineman (1987–1991)
- Magic Girls
- Magic Knight Rayearth (1996–1997)
- Magmaman (1990–1992)
- MÄR: Marchen Awakens Romance (2009)
- Marcelino Pan y Vino (re-aired 2014)
- Masked Rider Agito (2003–2004)
- Masked Rider Kuuga (2002–2003)
- Masked Rider Ryuki (2004–2005)
- Master of Epic: The Animation Age (2010)
- Marvel Anime
  - Iron Man (2011; re-aired 2013)
  - X-Men (1995–1996; re-aired 2013–2014)
  - Blade (2013–2014)
  - Wolverine (2014)
- Mechander Robo (1987–1988)
- Megaranger (2000–2001)
- Metal Fight Beyblade (2010–2014)
- Mga Munting Pangarap ni Romeo (1997)
- Mirmo Zibang! (2006)
- My Hero Academia (season 1) (2019)
- Nadia: The Secret of Blue Water
- Naruto (2004–2008)
- Naruto Shippuden (2008–2016)
- Neon Genesis Evangelion (1999–2000)
- Ninja Boy Rantaro
- Nura: Rise of the Yokai Clan (2012)
- One-Punch Man (2019)
- Paul in Fantasy Land (1999)
- Peter Pan
- Pollyanna (1996)
- Princess Resurrection (2010)
- Princess Sarah (1993; re-aired 2002, 2007, 2014)
- Project Arms (2003)
- Ragnarok the Animation (2004–2005)
- Rave (2003)
- Remi, Nobody's Girl (1999; re-aired 2004, 2007–2008, 2015)
- Robin Hood (1998)
- Saber Marionette J (1998–1999)
- Sailor Moon (2012) (on A2Z)
- Sailor Moon R (2013)
- Sakura Wars (2002)
- Samurai X (1999–2000; re-aired 2002)
- School Rumble (2007–2008)
- Sgt. Keroro (season 1) (2007)
- Shaider (1988–1991)
- Sky Ranger Gavan (1987–1991)
- Si Mary at Ang Lihim na Hardin (1996)
- Soul Eater (2010)
- Street Fighter
- Street Fighter II V (2000)
- Superbook
- Super Doll Licca (2000)
- Super Gals (2003)
- Super Inggo at ang Super Tropa (2009–2010; re-aired 2010)
- Superbook Classic (2014–2015)
- Swiss Family Robinson (2000)
- Tenchi-Muyo (1999)
- The Flying House (2015; re-aired 2016, as a Holy Week special on Good Friday)
- The Slayers (1997)
- The Slayers Revolution (1997–1998; re-aired 2012)
- The Three Musketeers (1997)
- Thunder Jet (1997)
- Tico and Friends (1997)
- Timerangers (2003–2004)
- Tokyo Underground (2004)
- Transformers (2009)
- Transformers: Cybertron (2009)
- Trapp Family Singers (1993)
- UFO Baby (2002–2008)
- Ultraman
- Ultraman Ace (1989–1996)
- Ultraman Gaia (2001–2002)
- Ultraman Max (2009)
- Ultraman Mebius (2013–2014)
- Ultraman X
- Ultraman Orb
- Voltes V (1987–1988)
- Voltron
- Wedding Peach (2000)
- Yaiba (1999–2000)
- Yakitate!! Japan (2006; re-aired 2013)
- Yu-Gi-Oh! 5D's (season 1) (2012; re-aired 2014, incomplete re-run)
- Yu-Gi-Oh! Duel Monsters (2003; re-aired 2014, incomplete re-run for only two weeks)
- Yu-Gi-Oh! GX (season 1) (2006)
- Yu-Gi-Oh! Zexal (season 1) (2013)
- Zenki (1997)
- Zoids: Genesis (2008–2009)
- Zorro (1997)

=== Australian TV shows ===
- A Dangerous Life (1988)
- Round the Twist

=== British TV shows ===
- Dempsey and Makepeace
- Mr. Bean (1992–1996, 2006–2014)
- Mr. Bean: The Animated Series (2006–2016)
- The Worst Witch (2003)

=== Canadian TV shows ===
- Black Hole High (2004–2005)
- Incredible Story Studios

=== Cartoons and children shows ===
- 100 Deeds for Eddie McDowd (2004–2005)
- The Adventures of Jimmy Neutron: Boy Genius (2010–2015)
- The Adventures of Madeline
- American Dragon: Jake Long (2007–2008)
- Are You Afraid of the Dark? (1992–1996)
- Avatar: The Legend of Aang (2010–2011; re-aired 2013–2014)
- The Avengers: Earth's Mightiest Heroes (2011–2013)
- Avengers Assemble (2014)
- Batman The Animated Series (1992–1996)
- Bananas in Pyjamas (1995–1999, 2002–2006)
- Barney & Friends (Seasons 7–8?, 2005–2006)
- Bear in the Big Blue House
- Blazing Dragons
- Bucky O' Hare
- The Bugs Bunny Show (1962–1963)
- C.O.P.S.
- Conan and the Young Warriors
- Dora the Explorer (2010–2011)
- Double Dragon II
- El Tigre: The Adventures of Manny Rivera (2012–2013)
- Fairy Tale Police Department
- The Fairytaler
- Fantastic Four
- Flipper & Lopaka
- Franklin
- Garbage Pail Kids
- G Force
- Go, Diego, Go! (2011–2012)
- Godzilla
- Godzilla: The Series
- Huckleberry Hound
- Hello Kitty
- Hello Kitty's Furry Tale Theater (2007–2008)
- Huntik: Secrets & Seekers (2010)
- The Incredible Hulk (2012)
- Inhumanoids (1986–1987)
- Iris, The Happy Professor (1996–2002)
- Jackie Chan Adventures
- Jem and the Holograms
- Julio at Julia, Kambal ng Tadhana (1994; re-aired 2007)
- Jumanji
- Kassai and Leuk
- Kidsongs (1988–1989)
- Kim Possible (2006–2009)
- The Krofft Supershow (1978)
- Kung Fu Panda: Legends of Awesomeness (2013–2016; re-aired 2018)
- Legendz: Tale of the Dragon Kings
- The Legend of Korra (2013–2017)
- Lilly the Witch (2008–2009)
- Lilo & Stitch: The Series (2005–2006)
- Littlest Pet Shop
- The Loud House (2017–2020)
- M.A.S.K.
- Maggie and the Ferocious Beast
- Marvel Knights (2012)
- Max Steel (2014–2015)
- Maya & Miguel (2006–2007)
- Men in Black
- Merrie Melodies
- Mona the Vampire (2008–2009)
- Mr. Bogus
- Mumble Bumble (2002–2005)
- Ni Hao, Kai-Lan (2012–2013)
- Oggy and the Cockroaches (2010–2020)
- Open Sesame
- The Penguins of Madagascar (2011–2012)
- Planet Sheen (2012–2013)
- Pole Position
- Rainbow Fish
- The Real Ghostbusters (1987–1992)
- Rolie Polie Olie (2002–2003)
- Round the Twist
- SantApprentice (2009; re-aired 2014)
- The Simpsons (1990–1993)
- Skyland
- Space Sentinels
- Spider-Man (2012)
- Spider-Woman
- SpongeBob SquarePants (2010–2020)
- Star Wars: Ewoks
- Stuart Little
- Super Mario Bros. Super Show
- The Super Hero Squad Show
- The Yogi Bear Show
- The Addams Family (1973 TV series)
- The Addams Family (1992 TV series)
- Twinkle, the Dream Being
- T.U.F.F. Puppy (2014)
- Teamo Supremo (2008–2009; re-aired 2026)
- Teenage Mutant Ninja Turtles (2009–2010)
- Teenage Mutant Ninja Turtles: Fast Forward (2009–2010)
- Totally Spies (2005–2010)
- Tom and Jerry (1966–1972; 1986–1988)
- Tommy and Oscar
- Trollz (2010)
- Ultimate Spider-Man (2013)
- Ulysses 31
- Visionaries: Knights of the Magical Light
- Voltron Force (2014)
- What-a-Mess
- Wild C.A.Ts
- Winx Club (2006–2009)
- Wolverine and the X-Men (2009)
- Wunderkind Little Amadeus (2006–2007)
- X-Men (2011–2012)
- Yogi's Gang
- Young Robin Hood

=== Drama ===
==== Telenovelas ====
- Ana Manuela (2014)
- Artificial Beauty (2008)
- Eco Moda (2002–2003)
- El Cuerpo (2008)
- Frijolito (2011)
- Isabella (2004)
- La Traicion (2008–2009)
- Malparida (2011)
- Pasión de Amor (2005–2006)
- Precious Time (2008–2009)
- Zorro: The Sword and the Rose (2007–2008)

Mexican

- Alicia (2001–2002)
- Alondra (1998–1999)
- Camila (2001)
- Chabelita (1999–2000)
- Cristina (2002–2003)
- Daniela (2002–2003)
- Daniela's Diary (2000–2001)
- Dos Amores (2005–2006)
- Inocente de ti (2006–2007)
- Las Tontas (2008)
- Lazos de Amor (1996–1997)
- Little Amy (2005–2006)
- Luisa (2003)
- Maria de Jesus: Ang Anghel sa Lansangan (2009–2010)
- Maria Mercedes (1996–1997)
- Marisol (1997–1998)
- Mirada de Mujer (2006)
- Niño Felipin (2000–2001)
- Nunca Te Olvidare (2002)
- Paloma (2002–2003)
- Por Ti (2003–2004)
- Romantica (2003)
- Rosalinda (2000)
- Rubí (2005)
- Tres mujeres (2001–2002)
- Wheels of Love (2003)

Venezuelan

- Altagracia (2003)
- Gata Salvaje (2003–2005)
- Ilusiones (1996–1997)
- Kassandra (1998–1999)
- Pura Sangre (2000–2001)
- Solita Mi Amor (2003–2004)

=== American ===
- 24 (2003–2005)
- 26 Men (1960)
- ALF (1987–1990)
- Alias (2002)
- American Chronicles
- America's Top 10
- Are You Afraid of the Dark?
- Baywatch (1990–1996)
- Beverly Hills, 90210 (1991–1996)
- Bonanza (1960–1972)
- The Days and Nights of Molly Dodd
- Doogie Howser M.D. (1990–1994)
- The Doris Day Show (1969–1972)
- Entertainment Tonight (1986–1996)
- Family Ties (1987–1991)
- The Famous Teddy Z (1990)
- Father Knows Best
- Free Spirit (1990)
- Hard Time on Planet Earth
- Highlander: The Series
- The Highwayman (1988)
- I Love Lucy
- In the Heat of the Night
- Inside Edition
- The Invisible Man
- It's a Living
- Jane the Virgin (2016)
- Lethal Weapon (2017)
- Mad About You (1993–1996)
- Man with a Camera (1961–1963)
- Melrose Place (1993–1996)
- Moonlighting (1987–1988)
- Murphy Brown (1989–1995)
- Mystic Knights of Tir Na Nog (2000–2001)
- The Nanny (1994–1996)
- Night Visions
- Over My Dead Body (1991)
- Perfect Strangers (1987–1991)
- Power Rangers (1995–1999, 2004–2015)
- She's the Sheriff
- Sledge Hammer!
- Starman
- Tales from the Darkside
- The Tracey Ullman Show
- The Twilight Zone
- The Young & The Restless (aired on ABS-CBN 1987–1989)
- Twin Peaks
- The United States and the Philippines: In Our Image (1989)
- Young Hercules (2000–2001)

== See also ==
- ABS-CBN Corporation
- ABS-CBN
- Kapamilya Channel
- List of programs distributed by ABS-CBN Studios
- List of ABS-CBN original drama series
- List of Philippine television shows
