= List of programs broadcast by The Filipino Channel =

These are the list of programs broadcast by The Filipino Channel.

== Current programming ==
=== Teleseryes ===
Primetime

- Sigabo (2026; also broadcast on All TV)

=== Entertainment ===
- Best Talk With Boy Abunda (2021–present)
- Kumu Star Ka with Papa Ahwel (2021–present)
- MYX News (2020–present)
- SeenZone (2018–present)

=== Variety shows ===
- ASAP XP (1995–present; also broadcast on All TV)
- It's Showtime (2009–present; also broadcast on All TV and GMA Pinoy TV)
  - It's Showtime Online (2020–present)

=== Educational/Children's shows ===
- Bahay Book Club (2020–present)
- Bayani (1995–2001; re-run)
- Epol/Apple (1999–2004; re-run)
- The Fat Kid Inside (2021–present)
- Hiraya Manawari (1995–2003; re-run)
- MathDali (2020; re-run)
- Sine'skwela (1994–2004; re-run)
- Team Yey! (2016–present)
- Wikaharian (2020)

=== Game ===
- Everybody, Sing! (2021–present)
- National Quiz Bee (2009-2010)

=== Talk shows ===
- Adobo Nation (2008–present)
- Bawal Mastress Drilon (2020–present)
- I Feel U (2020–present)
- Kabayani Talks (2018–present)
- Lakas Tawa (2020–present)
- Magandang Buhay (2016–present; also broadcast on All TV)
- Real Talk: The Heart of the Matter (2021–present)
- Thank You, Doc (2021–present)
- We Rise Together (2020–present)

=== News ===
- DZMM TeleRadyo on TFC (2008–present)
- News Patrol (2005–present)
- TV Patrol (1987–present (ABS-CBN, Kapamilya Channel/A2Z/All TV/PRTV Prime Media), 1994–present (TFC))
  - TV Patrol Weekend (2004–present (ABS-CBN, Kapamilya Channel/A2Z/All TV/PRTV Prime Media)
  - TV Patrol Live (2013–present)
- ABS-CBN News Channel on TFC (2017–present)
- The World Tonight (1994–1999 (ABS-CBN/TFC) 2020–present (ABS-CBN News Channel, Kapamilya Channel/All TV/TFC))
- TFC News
  - Asia Pacific Edition (2017–present)
  - Middle East-Europe Edition (2018–present)
- TFC This Week (2018–present)
- Balitang Indonesia (2021–present; Filipino Newscast)
- Balitang Malaysia (2021–present; Filipino Newscast)

=== Current affairs ===
- ANC Conversations (2020–present)

=== Infotainment ===
- At The Table (Season 2) (2017–present)
- Barangay USA Super Show (2011–present)
- Casa Daza (2017–present)
- Citizen Pinoy (2004–present)
- Food Prints (2020–present)
- K World (2017–present)
  - K World ATM (2020–present)
- Kwentong Barber (2021–present)
- Metro Chats (2021–present)
- Potluck (2020–present)
- Rated Korina (2020–present; also broadcast on All TV)
- So Janelle (2016–present)
- Team FitFil (2020–present)
- TFC Connect (2008–present)
- thatguySLATER (2021–present)

=== Religious shows ===
- The Healing Eucharist Sunday Mass (2006–present)
- Kapamilya Daily Mass (2020–present)
- Kapamilya Journeys of Hope (2020–present)
- Bro. Eddie Villanueva Classics (2020; also broadcast on A2Z and Light TV)

=== Movie blocks ===
- CineBro (2020–present)
- Reel Deal (2020–present)

=== Specials ===
- G Diaries (2017–present)
- Star Magic Specials (2021–present)
- iWant Originals (2020–present)

=== Interstitial and short programming ===
- Star Music Presents: Beats x Pieces (2021-present)
- On the Rise (presented by all RISE Artist Studio artist members) (2021-present)

== Previous programming ==
=== Teleseryes ===
- A Soldier’s Heart (2020)
- Love Thy Woman (2020)
- Ang sa Iyo ay Akin (2020-2021)
- Walang Hanggang Paalam (2020-2021)
- Bagong Umaga (2020-2021)
- Huwag Kang Mangamba (2021)
- Init sa Magdamag (2021)
- Marry Me, Marry You (2021)
- Viral Scandal (2021–2022)
- He's Into Her (2021–2022)
- La Vida Lena (2021–2022)
- The Broken Marriage Vow (2022)
- FPJ's Ang Probinsyano (2015–2022)
- Love in 40 Days (2022)
- Mars Ravelo's Darna (2022–2023)
- The Iron Heart (2022–2023)
- Dirty Linen (2023)
- Can't Buy Me Love (2023)
- Linlang: The Teleserye Version (2024)

Re-runs

The following re-runs of teleseryes were aired on The Filipino Channel as part of a temporary programming changes due to the enhanced community quarantine done to lower the spread of the COVID-19 pandemic in the Philippines which began in March 2020. Other re-run teleseryes were aired as a replacement when a re-run teleserye has ended.

- 100 Days to Heaven (2011; reruns)
- Walang Hanggan (2012 TV series) (2012; reruns)
- Got to Believe (2013-2014; reruns)
- On the Wings of Love (TV series) (2015-2016; reruns)
- Tubig at Langis (2016; reruns)
- Wildflower (TV series) (2017-2018; reruns)

=== Newscasts ===
- Balitang Europe (2005-2014)
- Balitang Middle East (2004-2014)
- Balitang Australia (2007-2010)
- Balitang America (2002-2021)

=== Reality ===
- Pinoy Big Brother: Connect (2020–2021)
- Your Face Sounds Familiar (season 3) (2021)
- Pinoy Big Brother: Kumunity Season 10 (2021–2022)
- Idol Philippines (season 2) (2022)
- Swak na Swak (2006–2021)

== See also ==
- List of iWant original programming
- List of programs broadcast by ABS-CBN
- List of programs broadcast by Kapamilya Channel
