= Pahina (TV series) =

- Genre: Educational
- Created by: ABS-CBN Foundation
- Starring: Carlo Aquino; Joonee Gamboa
- Theme music composer: Noel Cabangon
- Opening theme: "Pahina" by JCS
- Country of origin: Philippines
- Original language: Filipino

Original release
- Network: ABS-CBN
- Release: January 8, 2000 – 2001

Pahina was a Philippine educational television show produced by the ABS-CBN Foundation that premiered on January 8, 2000. Targeted towards high school students, the program aimed to promote and deepen the appreciation of Philippine literature. It was conceptualized in cooperation with the Department of Education, Culture and Sports (DECS) to serve as a supplementary audio-visual tool for classroom instruction.

== Premise ==
The show tackled classical and contemporary Philippine literature through a mix of dramatizations and contemporary situational skits. It centered around a teenager named Balt (played by Carlo Aquino), short for Baltazar, whose journalist grandfather Lolo Lope (Joonee Gamboa) constantly encouraged him to read and appreciate literary works. Throughout the episodes, Balt and his peers would find that the themes of various Filipino poems, short stories, and plays mirrored their own real-life high school struggles.

== Production ==
Pahina was produced by Gina Lopez, who was then the managing director of the ABS-CBN Foundation. It joined the network's established roster of educational television (ETV) programs, which included Sineskwela, Bayani, Hiraya Manawari, Math-Tinik, and Epol/Apple.

The program was directed by Jon Red, with Jovy Zarate serving as headwriter. To ensure the academic accuracy and literary merit of the show, the production team worked with consultants led by National Artist for Literature Bienvenido Lumbera.

The show's theme song, also titled "Pahina", was written by Zarate and composed by Noel Cabangon. It was performed by the teen band JCS, which consisted of lead star Carlo Aquino, Stefano Mori, and John Prats.

== Broadcast and Legacy ==
Pahina originally aired on ABS-CBN every Saturday morning from 9:30 to 10:30 AM, premiering on January 8, 2000. A second season premiered on July 7, 2001.

The show featured and analyzed works by prominent Filipino writers, including Francisco Balagtas, Andres Bonifacio, Jose Corazon de Jesus, Ildefonso Santos, and Genoveva Edroza-Matute, among others.

In August 2020, the Unyon ng mga Manunulat sa Pilipinas (UMPIL) or the Writers Union of the Philippines awarded ABS-CBN the Gawad Pedro Bucaneg. Pahina, alongside other educational shows from the network, was specifically recognized for its exceptional contribution to cultivating literary education and culture among the Filipino youth.
