= Anak TV Seal Awards =

Accolade by Anak TV

Anak TV Seal Awards logo
- Anak TV Seal Awards 2025
- Anak TV Seal logo
- Awarded for: Filipino media setting good examples for children
- Country: Philippines
- Presented by: Anak TV
- First award: 2000; 26 years ago
- Website: Official website

The Anak TV Seal Awards (Note: "Anak" is a gender-neutral Tagalog word meaning "son" or "daughter" in English.) are awards presented by the organization Anak TV. Its first ceremony was held in 2000. The awards recognize Filipino television shows and celebrities whom they deem to be "child-friendly", "child-sensitive", and "family-friendly". The ceremony is held annually at the Soka Gakkai International Building in Quezon City.

== History ==
=== Beginnings ===
In 1996, the organization Anak TV—then known as the Southeast Asian Foundation for Children's Television—was founded. The organization is described as an "advocacy organization that promotes television literacy and pushes the agenda for child-sensitive, family-friendly television in the Philippines". In 2000, the first Anak TV Seal Awards were held, Children's programs like Sineskwela (transl. School TV) and Epol/Apple were honored at the inaugural ceremony. In an interview with The Freeman's Januar Junior Aguja, Anak TV president (at the time of writing) Elvira Go described the awards ceremony's advocacy as empowering young viewers, stating that children are intelligent and aware of the media they consume. She added, "I want our children to feel that the world is still full of hope[...]. But we need to give them the chance to speak up, and that's what Anak TV has been doing since 2000."

== Background ==
=== Voting process ===
The choices of the awardees are made by a thousands of Filipinos known as Anak TV Seal Jurors, after a year-long assessment of television programs and personalities. The jurors are composed of parents, educators, business and media people, government media, various non-governmental organizations and religious sector which are known as Anak TV Seal Jurors.

== Awards ==
- Male Makabata Star
- Female Makabata Star
- Net Makabata Star
- Favorite Household Programs

=== Hall of Fame ===
- Anne Curtis
- Angel Locsin
- Bernadette Sembrano
- Charo Santos-Concio
- Jessica Soho
- Judy Ann Santos
- Kara David
- Karen Davila
- Kathryn Bernardo
- Kim Chiu
- Marian Rivera
- Mel Tiangco
- Sarah Geronimo
- Sharon Cuneta
- Toni Gonzaga
- Vicky Morales
- Alden Richards
- Arnold Clavio
- Atom Araullo
- Coco Martin
- Dingdong Dantes
- Drew Arellano
- Julius Babao
- Kim Atienza
- Gary Valenciano
- Mike Enriquez
- Noli de Castro
- Piolo Pascual
- Robi Domingo
- Ted Failon
- Vic Sotto

== Ceremony ==
=== Anak TV Seal Awards 2008 ===
The winners of Anak TV Seal Awards 2008 were determined through surveys in which the respondents were all children.

=== Anak TV Seal Awards 2010 ===
The Anak TV Seal Awards were held on December 8, 2010, at the Soka Gakkai International (SGI) Building in Quezon City. The winners for this year were determined by more than 3,000 judges from February to October, which included parents, teachers, government workers, non-government organizations, and Filipino youth.

=== Anak TV Seal Awards 2017 ===
The Anak TV Seal Awards 2017 were held on December 8, 2017, at the SGI Building. The winners for this year were determined by 5,000 adult jurors. The Filipino media network ABS-CBN led the year's winners, receiving 37 seals from the ceremony.

=== Anak TV Seal Awards 2018 ===
The Anak TV Seal Awards 2018 ceremony took place on December 7, 2018. Filipino media network GMA received 50 seals.

=== Anak TV Seal Awards 2019 ===
GMA received 51 seals at the Anak TV Seal Awards 2019. The ceremony was held again at the SGI Building.

=== Anak TV Seal Awards 2023 ===
In 2023, the Anak TV Seal Awards launched a category recognizing outstanding child-friendly online content. Elvira Go explained that the COVID-19 pandemic facilitated a surge in digital media.

=== Anak TV Seal Awards 2025 ===
The Anak TV Seal Awards 2025 recognized various child-friendly programs and conferred "Makabata Star" honors to celebrities who were deemed to be good role models for children.
