= Hoy Gising! =

- Genre: Reality News program Public Service
- Created by: ABS-CBN Corporation
- Developed by: ABS-CBN News and Current Affairs
- Presented by: See Hosts
- Country of origin: Philippines
- Original language: Filipino

Production
- Running time: 60 minutes (1993–1996); 30 minutes (1992–1993; 1996–2001)

Original release
- Network: ABS-CBN
- Release: May 4, 1992 – March 9, 2001

Related
- Hoy Gising! Kapamilya

Hoy Gising! (English: hey, wake up!) is a Philippine television news magazine show broadcast by ABS-CBN. Originally anchored by Ted Failon and Korina Sanchez, it aired from May 4, 1992 to March 9, 2001, replacing Isabel, Sugo ng Birhen. Cherie Mercado, Connie Sison, Francis Pangilinan, Gel Santos-Relos, Henry Omaga-Diaz and Aljo Bendijo serve as final anchors.

== Origin and format ==
Hoy Gising! was a public service program that began on TV Patrol as a segment handled by Frankie Evangelista. It grew into a half-hour program, later extended to an hour, chiefly anchored by Kris Aquino, Ted Failon, and Korina Sanchez. The show covered various problems associated with the government, as well as social issues, using a semi-humorous style of commentary on the featured issues and problems.

The show was directed by Rolly G. Reyes, who also wrote the lyrics of the theme song (set to the tune of Shame and Scandal by Trini Lopez) and created the segment titles. The show had a mambo-themed opening song performed by The Kumbancheros.

One of its weekly highlights every Friday was a summary of covered social and government-related complaints and issues in the show, and their statuses; the Honor Roll where solutions and actions to raised problems were lauded, and Horror Roll, where persisting and standstill issues are scorned and rounded up, to the tune of Wake Up Little Susie, and for the last entry, Taps.

The show also had provincial versions in Bacolod, Cebu and Davao from January 11, 1993 to March 9, 2001.

== Hosts ==
=== Original hosts ===
- Ted Failon (1992–2001)
- Korina Sanchez (1992–1996)
- Gel Santos-Relos (1996–2001)
- Ruth Abao-Espinosa
- Henry Omaga-Diaz (1997–2001)
- Connie Sison (1998–2001)
- Kata Inocencio
- Erwin Tulfo
- Kris Aquino (1992)
- Pia Hontiveros
- Francis "Kiko" Pangilinan (1995–1997; 1998–2001)
- Cherie Mercado (1996–2001)
- Julius Babao
- Daniel Razon
- Amy Perez
- Ilong Ranger (a cowboy in white shirt, shorts, cowboy hat, and gas mask who catches smoke-belching vehicles and factories emitting toxic smoke, played by Jose Rhoderick De Belen.)

Other staff working on the show included Doris Bigornia and Teodoro Casiño.

== See also ==
- List of programs broadcast by ABS-CBN
- Failon Ngayon
- TV Patrol
