= Winnie Cordero =

Filipino actress

- Born: Rowena Cordero; November 1, 1966 (age 60); Manila, Philippines
- Education: University of Santo Tomas
- Occupations: Comedian, Host, radio commentator, actress
- Years active: 1991–present
- Spouse: Dalmin Erquieza (m. 1996; died 2023)
- Children: 2

Rowena "Winnie" Cordero-Erquieza (Tagalog: [ˈwini kɔɾˈdɛɾɔ]; born November 1, 1966) is a Filipino comedian, actress and TV host.

== Education ==
Cordero is a Communication Arts graduate from the University of Santo Tomas. While there, she auditioned for the Artistang Artlets (AA), UST's local theater organization, and eventually became a member of its dance group in her freshman year. Even though the dance group disbanded a year later, she continued to be active in AA, eventually becoming its secretary in her sophomore year and its artistic director in her third year.

== Career ==
Cordero started her comedy career as a cast member in the live-action children's edutainment program Batibot when she was in her 3rd year of college. After graduation, she took various jobs such as becoming a receptionist and as a telemarketer. She got back into comedy when in 1992, she was endorsed by fellow Thomasian Cocoy Jimenez, director of Batibot, to be part of the revival of the gag show, Executive Champoy, on ABS-CBN. This led to more acting roles in different tv shows.

Cordero then started her radio career at DZMM from 1996 to 1997 when she talked with then DZMM anchor Joey Galvez who mentioned that DZMM needed a new voice to join him in his new showbiz program Showbiz Today.

Cordero was a host of Philippine morning television shows Alas Singko Y Medya, Magandang Umaga Bayan (later Magandang Umaga Pilipinas), and Umagang Kay Ganda, co-anchor of DZMM's Todo-Todo Walang Preno with Ariel Ureta, and a former anchor of TeleRadyo's HaPinay, Winner sa Life, and Lingkod Kapamilya. Currently, she is a segment anchor of TV Patrol segment, Winning Moment, an anchor for the public service program Aksyon Ngayon and talk show Win Today on DZMM TeleRadyo and DZMM Radyo Patrol 630.

== Personal life ==
Cordero met Dalmin Erquieza in 1990, and were married from 1996 until the latter's death from cancer in 2023. They have two daughters: Avelina Jearel ("Abbey", born 1990) and Maria Bettina (born March 2000), the latter a makeup artist and freelance producer.

== Filmography ==
=== Film ===
Year	Title	Role
1993	Dino... Abangan ang Susunod Na...	
1993	Makati Ave.: Office Girls	Miranda
1994	Nandito Ako	Agnes
1994	Bala at Lipistik	Saleslady 1
1994	Batang Lansangan	Maricris' maid
1995	Sa Ngalan ng Pag-ibig	
1995	Run Barbi Run	Cordero
1995	Best Friends	
1996	Wanted: Perfect Mother	Lucia
1996	Ang TV Movie: The Adarna Adventure	
1996	Onyok Tigasin	Maid
1997	Ang Ambisyosa	
1997	Computer Kombat	
1997	Asawa Mo, Misis Ko	Gretchen
1997	Magic Kingdom: Ang Alamat ng Damortis	
1997	Nasaan ang Puso	
1998	Alyas Boy Tigas: Ang Probinsyanong Wais	
1998	Pahiram Kahit Sandali	
1999	Hinahanap-hanap Kita	
1999	Weder-Weder Lang 'Yan	
2000	Mahal Kita, Walang Iwanan	
2000	Laro sa Baga	
2001	Sa Huling Paghihintay	
2003	Crying Ladies	
2003	Mr. Suave	

=== Television ===
Year	Title
1991–1997	Abangan ang Susunod na Kabanata
1992–1997	Ang TV
1995–2002	Sine'skwela
1996–2007	Alas Singko Y Medya/Magandang Umaga, Bayan/Magandang Umaga, Pilipinas
1998	Wansapanataym: Ang Itlog... Bow!
1998	Wansapanataym: Field Trip, Side Trip
2001	Wansapanataym: Alien... Alien... ang Naiba?
2002–2004	Berks
2003	Wansapanataym: Ang Siopao Na Ayaw sa Batang Matakaw
2007–2020	Umagang Kay Ganda
2007–2020	Todo-Todo Walang Preno
2010–present	TV Patrol
2019	Kadenang Ginto
2020–2023	Winner sa Life
2020–2023	HaPinay
2023	Lingkod Kapamilya sa TeleRadyo
2023–2025	Tatak: Serbisyo
2023–present	Win Today
2025–present	Aksyon Ngayon

== Radio ==
Year	Title
2004–2020	Todo-Todo Walang Preno
2023–2025	Tatak: Serbisyo
2023–present	Win Today
2025–present	Aksyon Ngayon
