= Hoy Gising! Kapamilya =

- Genre: Public affairs
- Created by: ABS-CBN Corporation
- Developed by: ABS-CBN News and Current Affairs
- Presented by: Ted Failon; Connie Sison; Bernadette Sembrano
- Country of origin: Philippines
- Original language: Filipino

Production
- Running time: 60 minutes (now been tapped in regional TV Patrol)

Original release
- Network: ABS-CBN
- Release: June 26, 2004 – September 17, 2005

Hoy Gising! Kapamilya is a Philippine television news magazine show broadcast by ABS-CBN. Hosted by Ted Failon, Connie Sison and Bernadette Sembrano, it aired on the network's Saturday afternoon line up from June 26, 2004 to September 17, 2005, replacing Simpleng Hiling and was replaced by Little Big Star. Each episode was taped on a roving passenger bus.

== Hosts ==
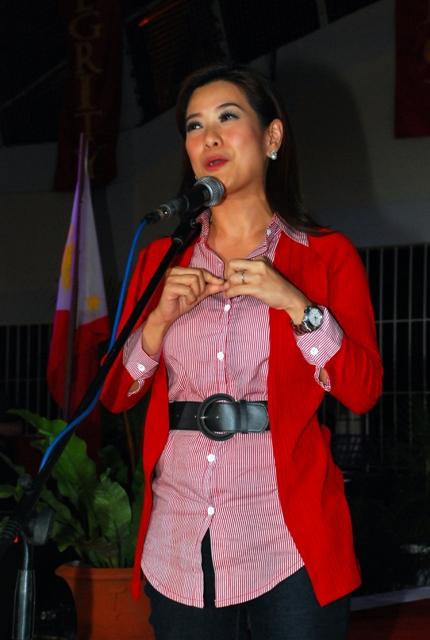
Bernadette Sembrano served as a host.

- Ted Failon
- Connie Sison
- Bernadette Sembrano

== See also ==
- List of programs broadcast by ABS-CBN
- Failon Ngayon
