= Homeboy (talk show) =

2005–07 Philippine defunct television talk show of ABS-CBN

- Title card
- Genre: Talk show
- Created by: ABS-CBN Studios
- Written by: Ian Reyno; Mico Del Rosario; Liza Endaya; Koko Nicanar; Ruth Padriga; Kate Valenzuela
- Directed by: Laurenti Dyogi
- Presented by: Boy Abunda
- Country of origin: Philippines
- Original language: Filipino
- No. of episodes: 624

Production
- Executive producer: Kylie Manalo
- Producers: Deo Endrinal; Gia Suyao; Tina Dela Merced; Michelle Riano
- Editors: Nino Co; May Gonzales; AJ Domingo; Joy Buenaventura; Thea Regadio
- Running time: 28-36 minutes
- Production company: ABS-CBN Studios

Original release
- Network: ABS-CBN
- Release: January 31, 2005 – June 29, 2007

Related
- Morning Star; Boy & Kris

Homeboy is a Philippine television talk show broadcast by ABS-CBN. Hosted by Boy Abunda, it aired from January 31, 2005, to June 29, 2007, replacing Morning Star and was replaced by Boy & Kris. Homeboy presented a dynamic discussion of real stories through interaction between Boy Abunda as host, his celebrity guests and his live studio audience.

The talk show is currently available online on Jeepney TV's YouTube Channel

== See also ==
- Sis
- Boy & Kris
- List of programs broadcast by ABS-CBN
- List of Philippine television shows
- Fast Talk with Boy Abunda
