= Aksyon Ngayon =

Filipino public service program

- Other names: Aksyon Ngayon: Global Patrol (2008–11)
- Genre: Public Service
- Running time: 1 hour
- Country of origin: Philippines
- Home station: DZMM (1991–2016; 2025–present)
- TV adaptations: DZMM TeleRadyo (2007–16; 2025–present)
- Hosted by: Winnie Cordero; Dr. Denis Ngo
- Created by: ABS-CBN (1991–2016); Media Serbisyo Production Corporation (2025–present)
- Original release: August 5, 1991 (1st iteration) – December 30, 2016 (1st iteration); June 2, 2025–present (2nd iteration)
- No. of episodes: n/a (airs daily)
- Opening theme: Breathe by the Prodigy (1st iteration)
- Website: http://www.dzmm.com.ph

Aksyon Ngayon (lit. 'Action Right Now') is a public service program aired on DZMM. Originally hosted by Ted Failon and Korina Sanchez, it premiered on August 5, 1991. The show originally concluded on December 30, 2016. It was then revived on June 2, 2025. The program airs weekdays from 2:00pm to 3:00pm with simulcast on The Filipino Channel worldwide. Winnie Cordero and Denis Ngo currently serve as hosts.

== History ==
On August 5, 1991, Aksyon Ngayon, the first-ever program on AM radio devoted solely to public service, was created. First anchored by Korina Sanchez and Ted Failon, Aksyon Ngayon immediately soared to the top of the ratings list. Because of the thousands of less-fortunate Kapamilyas flocking to the station asking for help from Aksyon Ngayon, the executives decided to create the DZMM Public Service Center, the first-ever separate office exclusively designed for public service by a local AM station.

To reach public service to Filipinos worldwide, the program changed its title to Aksyon Ngayon: Global Patrol in 2008.

In 2010, for the first time in Philippine radio history, the two radio stations DZMM and GMA Network's DZBB made a historical simulcast when they had two children asked for help to find their missing parents from Bohol on Aksyon Ngayon but reunited through DZBB's Aksyon Oro Mismo.

On January 11, 2011, Julius Babao joined the program, replacing David Oro. His arrival made the program revert to its debut title, Aksyon Ngayon, and moved its timeslot from 1:30pm-2:30pm to 11:00am-12:00nn.

In 2016, Kaye Dacer announced her resignation as anchor of the program due to her political stance and conflict of interest. Her family owned a major controlling stake in 8TriMedia Broadcasting Network, which is a blocktimer of DZRJ 810 AM, leaving Babao as the sole anchor until the program ended its broadcast on December 30, 2016. On January 2, 2017, the show was succeeded by ABS-CBN Lingkod Kapamilya sa DZMM, where Babao serves as a host and the Aksyon Ngayon name continued as a segment named Aksyon Ngayon sa Lingkod Kapamilya.

On June 2, 2025, Aksyon Ngayon returned to its airwaves as part of the programming of the relaunched DZMM after 7 years, with Winnie Cordero and Dr. Denis Ngo as its new hosts. It also returned to the afternoon timeslot after nearly 15 years.

== Format ==
Action is what this Catholic Mass Media Awards (CMMA) and KBP Golden Dove Award Best Public Service/Affairs Program recipient gives to the problems and concerns of our less fortunate Kapamilyas through its Aksyon Ngayon Center that operates for eight hours, five days a week. During its broadcast, those in need of immediate government assistance can get in touch directly with concerned agencies (like SSS, GSIS, LTO, and others) in person or via telephone. The program also links those who need help and donors while its on-air bulletin, "Panawagang Bayan," airs people's concerns— from lost possessions to finding missing loved ones.

Like other DZMM programs, Radyo Patrol reports can interrupt the program when a story breaks.

== Main hosts ==
=== Current hosts ===
- Winnie Cordero
- Dr. Denis Ngo

=== Former hosts ===
- Ted Failon (1991–96)
- Korina Sanchez (1991–96)
- Julius Babao (2011–16)
- Mel Tiangco
- Jay Sonza
- Aljo Bendijo
- Erwin Tulfo
- Joey Lina
- Alfredo Lim
- Jake Maderazo
- Kaye Dacer
- Fr. Tito Caluag
- David Oro

== Awards ==
- Public Service Award, for Babao and Dacer in the 63rd FAMAS Awards.

== See also ==
- ABS-CBN News and Current Affairs
- DZMM Radyo Patrol 630 (under ABS-CBN)
- DZMM Radyo Patrol 630 (under Media Serbisyo Production Corporation)
- DZMM TeleRadyo
- Wanted sa Radyo
