= Aquino & Abunda Tonight =

2014–15 Philippine television talk show

- Title card
- Genre: Entertainment news, Commentary
- Developed by: ABS-CBN Corporation
- Written by: Camille Abrenica; Clarabelle Bagsit
- Directed by: Arnel Natividad
- Presented by: Kris Aquino; Boy Abunda
- Country of origin: Philippines
- Original languages: Filipino; English
- No. of episodes: 430

Production
- Executive producer: Nancy Yabut
- Running time: 15 minutes Monday - Friday at 22:00 (2014-2015); 22:45 (2015) (Philippine Standard Time)
- Production company: ABS-CBN Studios

Original release
- Network: ABS-CBN
- Release: February 10, 2014 – September 25, 2015

Related
- Boy & Kris; SNN: Showbiz News Ngayon

Aquino & Abunda Tonight is a Philippine television talk show broadcast by ABS-CBN. Hosted by Kris Aquino and Boy Abunda. It aired on the network's Primetime Bida line up from February 10, 2014 to September 25, 2015, and was replaced by Tonight with Boy Abunda. The show also serves as a reunion for the host tandem three years after they did in SNN: Showbiz News Ngayon.

== Timeslot change ==
In July 2015, the show moved to a later time slot at 10:45pm Philippine Standard Time to exchange time slots with Pinoy Big Brother: 737.

== Format ==
A run-down of daily top stories, with topics raging from entertainment, lifestyle and politics. The program promises to deliver its segments "from layman's point of view", and with perspectives on how certain issues can affect viewers' daily lives.

== Hosts ==
=== Final hosts ===
- Kris Aquino
- Boy Abunda

=== Guest hosts ===
- Toni Gonzaga
- Alex Gonzaga
- Judy Ann Santos

== Cancellation ==
=== 2015: New show of Boy Abunda as a host ===
In September 2015, Aquino announced her departure from the show, citing her health reasons and her taping commitments for Kris TV and her two films, which paved way for the cancellation of Aquino & Abunda Tonight on September 25 after one year, and the transition to the newest talk show with Abunda as the host, entitled Tonight with Boy Abunda for which Abunda cited it will serve as a transitional show.

== See also ==
- List of programs broadcast by ABS-CBN
