= Pinoy Fear Factor =

- Pinoy Fear Factor logo
- Genre: Reality show
- Based on: Now or Neverland by John de Mol
- Directed by: Albert Langitan
- Presented by: Ryan Agoncillo
- Country of origin: Philippines
- Original languages: Filipino; Spanish
- No. of episodes: 75 (weekdays); 15 (Saturdays)

Production
- Production location: Argentina
- Running time: 30-45 minutes
- Production companies: Pulse Creative: ABS-CBN Studios; Endemol

Original release
- Network: ABS-CBN
- Release: November 10, 2008 – February 20, 2009

Pinoy Fear Factor is a Philippine television reality competition show broadcast by ABS-CBN The show is based from the Netherlands game show Now or Neverland. Hosted by Ryan Agoncillo, it aired on the network's Primetime Bida line up from November 10, 2008 to February 20, 2009, replacing Iisa Pa Lamang and was replaced by SNN: Showbiz News Ngayon. The Philippines is the 30th country to use Buenos Aires, Argentina as the location of the series. Other Fear Factor hubs are located in South Africa and Serbia.

Though the Philippine producers have plans to make the Philippines the next Fear Factor hub in the world, they still decided to shoot the first series in Buenos Aires, Argentina where stunts experts and resources are readily available.

The first series was won by Jommy Teotico who took home P2 Million (around US$50,000), a house and lot, and was given the title of "El Ultimo Participante" (The Ultimate Participant). It uses the tagline Ang buhay sa likod ng katapangan or "Life behind bravery." The theme song of the show, which is entitled Tagumpay (Triumph), is performed by Chivas Malunda (a contestant of Pinoy Dream Academy season 2).

Sister channel Studio 23 airs a condensed one-hour Saturday edition, covering the episodes shown within the week.

From December 22 to 26 and December 29 to 31, 2008, a special set of year-end episodes, known as Pinoy Fear Factor: With A Twist, was aired. The episodes, narrated by ABS-CBN's comedic news reporter Marc Logan, showed a recap of scenes from the six previous rounds, as well as new interviews from the Participantes and never-before-seen clips within and outside of the competition.

== Format ==
The Philippine version of the show uses a format similar to Fear Factor Extreme (FFX) instead of the original "three-stunt, one winner per episode" format used in the American version. The Philippines is the 3rd country to adapt the same format after South Africa and India.

Pinoy Fear Factor consists of multiple sets of stunts and a set number of contestants over a period of weeks. The contestants, known as Participantes, will live together in El Campo Miedo during the duration of the competition. Every Participante will face the Ronda de Eliminación to determine who will stay and who will be sent back to the Philippines. Each Ronda de Eliminación has three stunts. In the first stunt, designed to physically test the contestants, one or more Participantes who have the best performance will be exempted on the next stunt, thus, avoiding the elimination. In the second stunt, the remaining Participantes will compete and those who will give the worst performances will be chosen for the third and final stunt. In the third stunt, involving stunts similar to those in action films, the worst performer from the remaining Participantes in competition will be eliminated and will be sent back to the Philippines.

The Rondas de Eliminación will be repeated until only one Participante remains. The Participante emerges as the winner of the series and will take home the grand prize.

There is also a series of stunts known as Rondas Sin de Eliminación where the best performers of the first stunt in the Rondas de Eliminación will compete for special prizes.

It is noticeable that each round is held over two days. The first stunt occurs in the first day in location while the second and third stunts are performed in the second day at a different location. This is why punishments are only given out after the first stunt.

== Terms ==
Since the show takes place in a Spanish-speaking country, many terms and stunt names are in Spanish, an official language of the Philippines from the 19th to the late 20th centuries. It is noted, however, that some Spanish titles that appear on the show are either grammatically incorrect (Rondas Sin de Eliminación instead of Rondas sin Eliminaciones), wrongly used (the article una used to mean "first" rather than primera), or even misspelled (tersera [sic] instead of tercera).

- El Campo Miedo (Camp Fear): the lodge serving as the residence for the contestants.
- Participantes (participants): used to refer to the contestants of the show.
- Rondas de Eliminación (Elimination Rounds): they are the elimination rounds where they compete to stay longer in the competition. The performances of the contestants in the first stunt will determine who will compete in the succeeding stunts. The next two elimination stunts will pit the worst performers against each other to prevent themselves from further elimination. The worst performer in the third stunt is sent back to the Philippines.
- Rondas Sin de Eliminación (Non-Elimination Rounds): rounds of stunts in which the best performers would compete for a prize which may be different from the grand prize. Like the elimination rounds, there are also three stunts. The best performer in the third stunt wins a specific prize mentioned by the host, which may be different from the grand prize.

== Contestants ==
The contestants, known in the show as Participantes consisted of celebrities, as well as people with unique occupations. Note that the ages displayed were taken during the show's taping in 2008.

Contestants	Age	Hometown	Occupation
Bernabe "RJ" Calipus	20	Tondo	Wharf porter
Elmer Felix	25	Pampanga	Veterinarian and medical representative
Gail Nicolas	25	Quezon City	Commercial and runway model
Janna Dominguez	18	Malabon / Quezon City	Sales agent and bar performer
Jommy Teotico	24	Manila	Model
Jose Sarasola	22	Parañaque	Culinary arts student
LJ Moreno	27	Marikina	Pre-school teacher and former actress
Manuel Chua	27	Cabanatuan	Businessman
Marion dela Cruz	21	Austria / Valenzuela City	Student
Phoemela "Phem" Barranda	27	Parañaque	Television host model and actress
Ram Sagad	23	Quezon City	Model and ex-basketball player
Savannah Lamsen	23	Quezon City	Ledge dancer

== Stunts and challenges summary ==
Unless indicated otherwise, all times are in ss and mm:ss format. Also, since the stunts are also being performed in many Fear Factor franchises, the rules are explained below in the present tense.

=== Una Ronda de Eliminación (Elimination Round 1) ===
- Caminando Sobre Barriles Giratorios (Walking on Rotating Barrels): The stunt has a huge setup consisting of rotating barrels with two platforms on both ends, suspended five meters above the river. Each Participante had to make their way on the rotating barrels from one platform to the other while picking the yellow flaglets along the way. The retrieval of the flaglets should be in order. Skipping any flaglets is not allowed. The Participante who will get the most number of flaglets in the shortest possible time will be exempted from the second stunt, thus will be immune from the elimination. The worst performer will go back to camp on foot.
- Ojos De Vaca En Congrejos (Cows' Eyes In Crablets): A die is rolled to determine what the Participante will transfer from one box to the other. When the die turns up an eye, the Participante must pick up the five cows' eyes; if a crablet turns up, the Participante must transfer ten of the crablets. The three with the worst times, regardless of what they transferred, are sent to the final stunt.
- Escape de Auto Subacuatico (Escape from the Submerged Car): The Participante will sit in the driver's seat of a car as it is being lowered into the pool. At the signal of a red light, the Participante must unbuckle their seat belt, unstrap a baby doll from the infant seat, resurface and place the doll on the mat. The worst performer goes home to the Philippines.

While none of the Participantes completed the entire stunt, Phem's performance was rated the best, picking up two flaglets before falling into the water. Jose also picked up two flaglets, but his second one was not counted as he retrieved it out of order. Gail and RJ were not able to get any flaglets, with RJ's performance deemed the worst by clocking in only 22 seconds, forcing him to go back to camp on foot. With Phem the only one exempted, the eleven delved into the second stunt with Janna besting the other Participantes by transferring ten crablets in 23 seconds. Gail, Marion, and Elmer meanwhile each transferred the five cows' eyes and registered the worst times, putting them in the third stunt. Marion and Elmer finished their third stunt, but Gail wasn't able to release the doll before surfacing, which made her eliminated.

=== Segunda Ronda de Eliminación (Elimination Round 2) ===
- Coglarse Como Tarzan (Hanging On Ropes Á La Tarzan): The Participantes will straddle across two platforms using ropes suspended on a scaffolding 15 meters above the ground. Those who complete the stunt are automatically exempted from the rest of the round. In case a Participante is unable to complete the stunt, the length of time spent on the stunt and the number of ropes swung before falling are also considered in the assessment. The two women and the two men with the best performances are exempted from the succeeding stunts. The worst performer will dance naked back at camp.
- Cerebros y Ojos de Ovejas (Sheep's Brains and Eyes): Each Participante will drink a glass of milk. Under the glass is the number of eyes and the amount of brains the Participante will eat. The stunt only ends when the amount to be eaten has been consumed. The amount of time taken is considered for the Participante's performance. Vomiting everything that was consumed during one's turn while the stunt is ongoing for the others is not allowed. The four worst performers will compete in the final stunt.
- Acrobacias en Helicóptero (Acrobatics on a Helicopter): The Participante would hang onto a trapeze attached to a helicopter for as long as one can before dropping into the water. The one who hangs on the shortest goes back to the Philippines.

Marion and Manuel both completed the stunt with very impressive times of 50 and 47 seconds respectively, exempting them from the next two stunts. Among the women, only LJ was able to complete the stunt. Phem was also exempted from the rest of the round, having traversed four ropes in a minute and a half, the most among the remaining women. Janna had roughly the same time as Phem, but just for hanging on one rope. Jommy was deemed the worst ever performer among the men, clocking in at 1:22 after straddling four ropes. Because of this, Jommy danced in front of his fellow Participantes almost in the nude, while Janna "hosted" Jommy's show. In the second stunt, Janna and Savannah each finished half a brain at 4:14 and 1:09 respectively. Among the men, RJ ate half a brain and three eyeballs in two minutes, putting him between the girls and making them the top three performers. The rest of the men thus competed in the third stunt. Ram clocked in the worst time at only 30 seconds, making him the second person bound for home.

=== Tersera Ronda de Eliminación (Elimination Round 3) ===
- Auto Resbaladizos (Slippery Car): Sitting in the driver's seat of a car suspended 20 meters from the ground and being drenched by artificial rain, each Participante must climb out via the side window to the hood to retrieve the license plate, head to the trunk to get the key, get back inside the car, and use the key to turn on the horn, which they will sound to signal the accomplishment of the stunt. Time penalties of ten seconds each are added in case either or both needed items drop to the ground. The two men and the two women with the fastest times are exempted from competing in the rest of the round. The one with the worst time will take a very cold bath.
- Tanque con Serpientes (Tank with Snakes): Each Participante dives into a water tank containing various snakes to retrieve as many yellow and black rubber rings as one can in five minutes. The woman and the two men with the worst performances go to the final stunt, as to be determined by the number of yellow rings gathered. In case of a tie, the black rings become the tie-breaker.
- Bicicleta Atraves de Vidrios (Bicycle Cruising through Glass): Riding a bicycle, each Participante must break into five panes of glass. The Participante must not fall nor let the feet touch the ground during the performance of the stunt; doing so prematurely ends it. The one with the least panes of glass broken through is sent home to the Philippines. In case of a tie, the location of the bicycle's hind wheel becomes the tie-breaker.

Manuel performed the first stunt in just 44 seconds, not only setting the best time for the stunt, but also broke the world Slippery Car record; the previous record was three minutes and seven seconds, held by a contestant of A Rettegés Foka, the Hungarian version of the franchise. Elmer had the best time among the men behind Manuel at one minute and twelve seconds, while LJ and Janna clocked the best times among the women at 3:40 and 3:55 respectively. Savannah did not finish the stunt, and therefore had Jose douse her with cold water back at camp. In the second stunt, Jose was bitten by snakes twice, causing him to freeze in shock. While he had the will to continue the stunt, the pain proved unbearable and he had to retire so he could be treated by doctors. Phem also had to pass on the stunt after being freaked out by the snakes. Their premature ends to the second stunt guaranteed them participation in the third stunt. They were joined by Jommy, who gathered only seven yellow rings, while both RJ and Marion retrieved eight. Although Savannah got only two rings, five less than Jommy, Phem quitting the stunt automatically exempted Savannah from the third stunt. In the third stunt, Jommy was able through break through one pane of glass, while Jose, despite the pain from the snake bites from earlier, pedalled through all five panes. Due to Phem's lack of experience on a bicycle, she was not able to break any panes, thus her elimination.

=== Cuarta Ronda de Eliminación (Elimination Round 4) ===
- Travesaño Al El Aire (Crossing on Air): In ten minutes, the Participantes must traverse a plank on the first level, climb one ladder, crouch on an almost horizontal pole on the second level, scale a second ladder and walk on a second plank at the third level, at the end of which they should remove a flag. The fastest one to complete the stunt is exempted from competing in the rest of the round.
- Transferiendo Curachas (Transferring Cockroaches): In two minutes using their mouths, Participantes must transfer cockroaches from one container filled with maggots atop one barrel to an empty container on another barrel. Spitting and shaking the barrels are not allowed, but biting is, although potentially causing to kill a cockroach in the process. The woman and two men with the least live cockroaches gathered will compete in the third stunt. Dead and swallowed cockroaches do not count.
- Arrastrado en el Concrete (Being Dragged on Concrete): Each Participante wears a metal suit and is dragged behind a pick-up truck driving along a 160-meter runway. At the end of the runway is the Fear Factor logo; the Participante must let go of the drag line on a "line of fire" and must stop near the logo. The one who stops farthest from the logo goes back to the Philippines.

In the first stunt, Manuel was the only one exempted from the rest of the round, performing the stunt at a fast time of 1:50. During the second stunt, Elmer swallowed a cockroach, while the others were bitten by cockroaches on the face. In the end, Jose and Jommy were slated to compete in the final stunt for the third straight round, gathering 295 and 305 roaches respectively, while RJ, Elmer, and Marion had 543, 428, and 345 roaches to their credit respectively. Joining them in the final stunt was LJ, the worst among the women with 318 (Janna got 327 and Savannah at 325). In the third stunt, LJ and Jommy went closest to the center of the logo at 105 cm and 150 cm from the logo respectively. Jose, on the other hand, stopped over four meters from the logo, thus becoming the fourth person to head for the Philippines.

=== Quinta Ronda de Eliminación (Elimination Round 5) ===
- Salta a la Red (Jumping to a Net): The Participantes climb up 30 meters to a platform, and then have one minute to jump from the platform to a net suspended at least three meters from the platform, and then hang on for five seconds. The two men and the two women who clung to the highest parts of the net are exempted from competing in the next two stunts.
- Manzanas en Anguilas y Serpientes (Apples in Eels and Snakes): Participantes bob for apples from a container filled with snakes and eels to an empty container within five minutes. The one who transferred the most apples into the empty container is exempted from competing from the third stunt.
- Cierre de Houdini (Houdini's Escape): Participantes are handcuffed and zipped inside a large plastic bag, which is then submerged. Participantes must release one wrist from a cuff using a key tied to the cuff, unzip oneself from the bag, resurface, and swim to the edge of the pool. They must also signal the safety divers in case they want to quit from the stunt. The one with the slowest time or spent the least time underwater before quitting must leave for the Philippines.

In the first stunt, RJ and Jommy clung to the net the highest, thus exempting them from the next two stunts. Among the women, LJ had the worst performance, holding on a square from the 4th line from the top of the net, thus exempting Savannah and Janna from further competition. In the second stunt, while both Manuel and Marion gathered all 20 apples, one of the apples picked up by Manuel was discounted because it fell to the ground rather than the container. Marion thus became the one exempted from competing in the third stunt. Manuel was the only one to finish the third stunt, and while both Elmer and LJ quit, the latter stayed longer underwater. Elmer became the fifth person to go home because of this.

=== Ronda Sin Eliminación 1 (Non-elimination Round 1) ===
- Colgado en Moviemento (Swinging across a Structure): The Participantes must climb up a ladder, then swing across a revolving beam with monkey bars on it to the end, where a flaglet should be removed. If no one is able to complete the stunt, the performance is assessed by how far the Participante had gone, as denoted by the ruler at the beam. The three men and the two women who have the best performances will get to compete in the next stunt.
- Arañas en la Cabeza y Ratas (Spiders on the Head and Rats): The Participante is seated with their head inside a container occupied by seven tarantulas. The Participante then has to separate fifteen gray rats from a container on their right (the viewer's left) with ten white rats by transferring the gray rats to a second container on their left (the viewer's right) within three minutes. The woman and the two men who finish the stunt the fastest would compete in the final stunt.
- Helicóptero Volando Hacia la Boya (Helicopter Buoy Flag): Awaiting from a floating barge, the Participantes must hang onto one landing rail of a helicopter. They must then fall into the water near a buoy and swim to it to retrieve a flaglet from under it. Upon retrieval of the flaglet, the Participante must then swim to another floating barge. The fastest one to complete the stunt wins P50,000.

Only RJ was the only one not to complete the first stunt among the men; Jommy, Manuel, and Marion completed it in at 26, 27, and 42 seconds respectively. While none of the women were actually able to complete the stunt, Savannah was ranked the worst because she didn't reach 90 cm of the beam, the point where both Janna and LJ reached in 48 and 40 seconds respectively before dropping into the water. Ryan then belatedly informed the Participantes that the round was a non-elimination round and RJ and Savannah were therefore exempted from the next two stunts. Before the beginning of the second stunt, Manuel answered allegations of unfair trash-talking off-camera and other accusations made by Jose and Elmer against him, which he mostly denied. In the second stunt, Janna completed it three seconds faster than LJ (Janna's time was 1:25 while LJ's was 1:28). Among the men, Manuel again proved his speed by clocking in at 1:10. Marion then registered a time six seconds less than that of Jommy (Jommy's time was 1:51 while Marion's was 1:45). Jommy and LJ thus became mere spectators of the third stunt, where it was a dead heat between Marion and Manuel. Marion swam faster than Manuel, even though he was not used to deep water; Marion was slowed down, however, by exhaustion while trying to climb up the barge. Thus, Manuel won the P50,000 with a time of 1:17 against Marion's time of 1:23; Janna was a virtual also-ran at a time of 2:29.

=== Sexta Ronda de Eliminación (Elimination Round 6) ===
- Caminata Sobre Palo (Walking Over Poles): The Participante climbs up the first pole. Upon reaching top, he must stand up on one's two feet before proceeding to the second part of the stunt. Once balanced, the clock is reset and the Participante then has to gather the flaglet attached to the first pole and the other flaglets on the next five poles. They must stand on the poles with their feet to retrieve the flags and must either hold on to them or keep them on their person as lost flaglets do not count. The one who got the most flaglets in the least time is exempted from the rest of the round. The worst performer earns both a bye on the second stunt and an automatic spot in the third.
- Kiosco del Dulce (Kiosk of Sweets): The Participantes chose lollipops that represent the jars of "sweets" (which are in fact, creepy crawlies) from each they would eat from. Each Participante must eat a number of the assigned "sweet" as specified by the host in the least amount of time possible. The three slowest ones to eat their assigned treats advance into the final stunt.
- Bungee Invertido (Upside-down Bungee): Participantes are connected to a bungee cord upside down while handling a weight using one's hands. Each is then hoisted underwater for as long as they can. Time starts when one's head is underwater; time ends when they let go of the weight and be pulled up by the cord. The one who spent the shortest time underwater leaves for the Philippines.

In the first stunt which was plagued by a local weather disturbance known as "La Tormenta de Sta. Rosa," while both Manuel and Marion retrieved all six flaglets before falling from the fifth pole, Marion's performance was deemed the best, with a faster time of 43 seconds against Manuel's 1:23. Savannah, who was not able to completely climb the first pole, was given the automatic spot in the third stunt. In the second stunt, RJ clocked the fastest time, eating two skinned rats in 1:28. Joining him was Jommy, who ate 10 scorpions in 2:21. Manuel, LJ, and Janna joined Savannah for the third stunt; Janna consumed 20 maggots in 4:14, LJ ate 20 cockroaches in 3:22, and Manuel feasted on a "Fear Factor Special" consisting of a skinned rat, two scorpions, five cockroaches, five maggots, and several earthworms in 3:18. In the third stunt, Manuel and Janna posted times of 1:18 and 39 seconds, respectively, preventing outright elimination. But the topic of LJ performing the stunt without a noseclip was brought up. Argentine staff claimed that they offered her a noseclip, but she refused; however, tapes from earlier showed the offer was not done. LJ wanted to redo the stunt, and Savannah agreed. LJ was then told to redo the stunt, this time with the noseclip; if she would beat Savannah's original time, Savannah would redo her stunt. But LJ's performance did not improve even with the noseclip; her times were 12 seconds without the noseclip and 11 seconds with it. Savannah's time of 19 seconds sent LJ back to the Philippines.

=== Ronda Sin Eliminación 2 (Non-elimination Round 2) ===
While belatedly announced, this was indicated as the last non-elimination round.

- Red Bajo en Helicóptero (Net Under the Helicopter): From one side a flying helicopter, the Participantes traverse a net hanging under it in any way they desire, reach the other end, get back inside the helicopter, and press the button to stop the clock. Time also stops when the Participante falls into the water below. In case the Participant was not able to complete the stunt, the length of net covered and/or the amount of time spent in the stunt is also considered in the assessment. The four Participantes with the best performances would move on to the second stunt.
- Tanque de Leche (Tank of Milk): The Participantes sit down and hold a flaglet with their hands while the container that surrounds their head is being filled up with milk. Time starts at the signal and stops when the flaglet is let go. The two who did the stunt the longest compete in the final stunt.
- Reingresar en el Camión (Reparking in the Truck): Participantes drive a car out of a moving truck, make a u-turn and drive the car back into the truck. The one with the faster time in the stunt wins P50,000.

During the first stunt, only Manuel and Jommy accomplished the stunt; Manuel did his in 26 seconds, while Jommy finished it in 34 seconds, both even faster than the previous world Fear Factor record of 36 seconds by a contestant of Frente al Miedo, the Colombian version of the franchise. Among the men, the two were joined by RJ in advancing to the second stunt. RJ reached the third yellow line on the net in 17 seconds; Marion fell straight into the water upon beginning the stunt. Among the women, Janna advanced to the second stunt despite experiencing injury after her right foot got caught in the net traversing the fourth yellow line and had to be rescued and rushed to the hospital; Savannah was able to reach the third yellow line slower than RJ did before falling and was therefore out in the running for the rest of the round. In the second stunt, Manuel and Jommy become automatic qualifiers for the third stunt; Manuel's time was 4:30 while Jommy's was 4:05. In the third stunt, Jommy drove so fast that by the time the car re-entered the truck, it jumped and piled itself over one of the reserve cars inside, injuring eight of the Argentine crew who were in the truck. Despite this, he not only won over Manuel by 24 seconds (29 seconds for Jommy, 53 seconds for Manuel), he also broke another world Fear Factor record; the previous one was 30 seconds by another contestant of Frente al Miedo. Jommy therefore won the second and the last P50,000.

=== Séptima Ronda de Eliminación (Elimination Round 7) ===
- Cofre en el Agua (Coffin in Water): Participantes lay down inside a transparent glass coffin being submerged underwater. At the signal of a pilot light, the Participante must open a lock using one of three keys to release themselves from the coffin and swim toward the edge of the pool marked with the logo. The two who finished the stunt the fastest would be exempted from further competing in the round. In case no one finished the stunt, the lengths of time the Participantes lasted underwater will also be assessed.
- Caja del Terror (Box of Terror): The Participantes are laid inside a box which is partitioned in three sections, one at the head, one surrounding the feet and the middle section, each to be filled with either rats, snakes, or frogs. The Participante must transfer the specified number of the selected animal in the middle section to a fish tank next to the box in three minutes. The fastest one to accomplish the stunt would be exempted from competing in the third stunt. In case all were not able to complete the stunt, the number gathered will be assessed.
- Circuito con Explosiones (Circuit with Explosions): Each Participante tries out a giant wire loop game, in which touching the wire maze with the giant electrical hoop triggers a fiery explosion behind the Participante. The one who completes the stunt the slowest or the one who went the least distance (in the most time) before setting off the explosion goes home to the Philippines.

In the first stunt, only Marion and Jommy were exempted from further competing in the round, finishing the stunt at 19 and 20 seconds respectively. Manuel and Savannah clocked in identical times of 26 seconds each, but Savannah was penalized with five additional seconds for holding the lock and keys before the pilot light's signal was given. Janna had a time of 42 seconds, while RJ was the only one not to finish the stunt, quitting after 24 seconds in the coffin. In the second stunt, Manuel was the only one who had snakes around his head and rats at this feet while the others had rats around their heads and snakes at their feet; all were tasked to transfer 15 frogs. Due to her fear of rats, Savannah was able to transfer 12 frogs in three minutes (she actually collected 13, but one landed outside the fish tank). RJ was able to transfer 15 frogs in 39 seconds, but one landed out of the fish tank and another ended up in another compartment of the box, thus putting the official count at 13. Both Manuel and Janna were able to completely transfer 15 frogs, but Janna did it two seconds faster than Manuel (Janna's time was 1:45 while Manuel's was 1:47), thus saving her from further competition. Leading to the third stunt, a test explosion related to it attracted the attention of local police, and per their instructions, all production was postponed to the following day and done in another location. In the third stunt itself, Manuel was the only one who completed the stunt, finishing it in 1:28. RJ and Savannah both set off explosions, and distance therefore became the assessing factor. Savannah looped 2.97m of the wire, while RJ crossed only 2.6m, making him the seventh person to fly home.

=== Octava Ronda de Eliminación (Elimination Round 8) ===
- Atrasado Por Un Caballo (Slowed Down by a Horse): Participantes hold on to a line, as they are being dragged by a horse through a muddy field. The one who would hang on the longest is exempted from competing in the rest of the round.
- Cinta Transportada de Fruticias (Strawberry Conveyor Belt): Forty strawberries are transported on a tilted conveyor belt. A Participante must catch them one by one and place them in the box. To make things difficult, a chosen fellow Participante places distractions on the conveyor belt along with the strawberries, such as gunk and pieces of raw meat. The two Participantes switch roles so both would have a chance to try both sides. The one who places the most strawberries in the box is exempted from competing in the final stunt.
- Pared Giratoria (Rotating Wall): Participantes must scale both sides of a rotating wall in as many revolutions as they can in ten minutes without falling off. The one who performs the least revolutions goes home to the Philippines

In the first stunt, Manuel held on the tow rope the longest at 1:01, to the point that the horse tired out first before the line slipped off his hands, thus saving him from certain elimination. Jommy and Marion stayed on the tow line for 54 and 39 seconds respectively. The women did not fare well in the stunt; Janna's time was just five seconds while Savannah's was only three seconds. In the second stunt, Savannah retrieved one strawberry, Marion got six, and Jommy and Janna had eight. With only three spots for the third stunt, Manuel, who was present to observe his potential final adversaries, was made to choose which from Jommy and Janna he should take to the final round and which one should compete in the third stunt. Manuel chose Jommy to compete in the third stunt, based on his assessment that Janna caught more strawberries that didn't reach the box, thus discounting them. In the final stunt, Jommy was the only one able to last the entire ten minutes, pulling off 12 revolutions and thus securing a place in the final round. On the other hand, while both Marion and Savannah fell off the wall without lasting ten minutes, Marion was able to do three revolutions before falling off while Savannah slid off the wall at the onset, ending her stint in the show.

=== Último Ronda de Eliminación (Final Elimination Round) ===
The process of elimination in this round is slightly different, and determines the winner of the entire show.

- Enterado Vivo (Buried Alive): Participantes enter a coffin and stay there for five minutes while the trapdoor from which they entered is being buried in sand. Once sand enters the coffin through the trapdoor, they must then dig themselves out of the coffin, emerge from it and run to the Fear Factor logo. The slowest one to emerge from the buried coffin is eliminated.
- Arañas en la Boca (Spiders in the Mouth): Participantes handle tarantulas inside their mouths without harming them for two minutes, then eat and swallow them afterwards. The slowest one to accomplish the entire stunt is eliminated.
- Volcando el Auto (Car Roll Over): Participantes must drive a car very fast towards a slanted ramp which causes the car to flip over. The one who lands the car farthest from the starting line becomes "El Último Participante."

In the first stunt, Marion registered another world Fear Factor record for the Philippine franchise by performing the stunt in 3:53, beating the previous record of 4:09, set by a contestant of the Turkish version of Fear Factor. Jommy clocked in a time of 4:40. Meanwhile, both Janna and Manuel had trouble while performing the stunt. Janna, who had her head buried in sand and had to be rescued needlessly by the Argentine safety crew, was able to finish the stunt in 7:43. On the other hand, Manuel had his knees trapped from the trapdoor, which added more or less four minutes to his time. Thus, he finished the stunt in 8:23, which placed him into fourth place, eliminating him ultimately in the process. In the second stunt, Janna clocked the fastest time at 2:56. Facing against Janna in the final stunt was Jommy, whose time of three minutes was better than Marion's 3:32. In the final stunt, dubbed as "El Último Duelo" (The Final Duel), Jommy landed the car farther at 22.5m compared to Janna's 17.1m. He was therefore deemed "El Último Participante."

== Elimination chart ==
Round	1	2	3	4	5	N1	6	N2	7	8	F
Participante	Performance										
Jommy	2nd	3rd	3rd	3rd	1st	2nd	2nd	WIN	1st	3rd	WIN
Janna	2nd	2nd	1st	2nd	1st	3rd	3rd	2nd	2nd	2nd	OUT
Marion	3rd	1st	2nd	2nd	2nd	3rd	1st	1st	1st	3rd	OUT
Manuel	2nd	1st	1st	1st	3rd	WIN	3rd	3rd	3rd	1st	OUT
Savannah	2nd	2nd	2nd	2nd	1st	1st	3rd	1st	3rd	OUT	
RJ	2nd	2nd	2nd	2nd	1st	1st	2nd	2nd	OUT		
LJ	2nd	1st	1st	3rd	3rd	2nd	OUT				
Elmer	3rd	3rd	1st	2nd	OUT						
Jose	2nd	3rd	3rd	OUT							
Phem	1st	1st	OUT								
Ram	2nd	OUT									
Gail	OUT										

Legend:

For Rondas de Eliminación, except the last one:

1st The Participante had one of the better performances in the first stunt and was therefore exempted from competing in the next two stunts.
2nd The Participante had one of the better performances in the second stunt and was therefore exempted from competing in the third stunt.
3rd The Participante had one of the better performances in the third stunt and was therefore saved from elimination in the third stunt.
OUT The Participante had the worst performance in the third stunt and was therefore eliminated.

For Rondas Sin de Eliminación (as denoted by the letter N in the chart):

1st The Participante had one of the worse performances in the first stunt and was therefore exempted from competing in the next two stunts.
2nd The Participante had one of the worse performances in the second stunt and was therefore exempted from competing in the third stunt.
3rd The Participante had one of the worse performances in the third stunt and therefore lost the round.
WIN The Participante had the best performance in the third stunt and therefore won the round.

For Último Ronda de Eliminación (as denoted by the letter F in the chart):

OUT The Participante had the worst performance in the first stunt and was therefore eliminated, finishing in fourth place for the entire show.
OUT The Participante had the worst performance in the second stunt and was therefore eliminated, finishing in third place.
OUT The Participante had the worse performance in the final stunt and therefore finished in second place.
WIN The Participante had better performance in the final stunt and was therefore El Último Participante.

== See also ==
- List of programs broadcast by ABS-CBN
