= Simply KC =

2010 Philippine defunct morning talk show of ABS-CBN

- Title card
- Genre: Talk show
- Developed by: ABS-CBN Corporation
- Presented by: KC Concepcion
- Opening theme: "Magandang Umaga" by KC Concepcion
- Country of origin: Philippines
- Original language: Tagalog
- No. of episodes: 110

Production
- Running time: 30 minutes
- Production company: ABS-CBN Studios

Original release
- Network: ABS-CBN
- Release: May 24 – October 22, 2010

Related
- Ruffa & Ai; Kris TV

Simply KC is a Philippine morning talk show broadcast by ABS-CBN, hosted by KC Concepcion. The program aired on the network's Umaganda morning block from May 24 to October 22, 2010. It also aired worldwide via TFC.

== Host ==
- KC Concepcion

== See also ==
- List of programs broadcast by ABS-CBN
