= Ruffa & Ai =

2009 Philippine defunct television talk show of ABS-CBN

- Genre: Lifestyle, Talk show
- Developed by: ABS-CBN Corporation
- Directed by: GB Sampedro
- Presented by: Ruffa Gutierrez; Ai-Ai delas Alas
- Country of origin: Philippines
- Original language: Filipino
- No. of episodes: 177

Production
- Camera setup: Multiple-camera setup
- Running time: 60 minutes (including commercial)
- Production company: ABS-CBN Studios

Original release
- Network: ABS-CBN
- Release: February 16 – October 23, 2009

Related
- Boy & Kris; Simply KC

Ruffa & Ai is a Philippine television talk show broadcast by ABS-CBN. Hosted by Ruffa Gutierrez and Ai-Ai delas Alas, it aired from February 16 to October 23, 2009, replacing Boy & Kris.

== History ==
The then-morning talk show Boy & Kris was at the brink of cancellation due to its rival competitor SiS (through the triumvirate of sisters Gelli de Belen and Janice de Belen and Carmina Villarroel) consistently topping the ratings slate. In January 2009, rumors were spreading that the show will be moving to late-night but later February 3, 2009, Boy Abunda and Kris Aquino then confirmed this rumor, which led to airing their final episode on February 13 and they announced that their show will be replaced by a new morning talk show hosted by "Two Queens".

Another teaser following the show's cancellation aired hinting who would be the new hosts of the new morning talk show. It was revealed that Ruffa Gutierrez (Binibining Pilipinas-World 1993 and Miss World 1993 Second Princess) and Ai-Ai delas Alas (Philippines' Comedy Concert Queen) are named the hosts of the show under the title Ruffa & Ai and premiered on February 16, 2009. In turn, Boy & Kris were moved to late-night and hosted the new showbiz-oriented news show SNN: Showbiz News Ngayon.

In the first episode of the show, Abunda introduced the 2 of them in their new stints and featured KC Concepcion, Sarah Geronimo and Gabby Concepcion as its first guests. The show proved to be an instant success and topped the ratings game. It airs before Pilipinas, Game Ka Na Ba?, which is hosted by Edu Manzano.

In August 2009, the show was turned into a pre-pageant primer due to the airing of the Miss Universe 2009 pageant on the network, which featured Binibining Pilipinas-Universe 1994 and Miss Universe 1994 Top 6 finalist Charlene Gonzales as guest host substituting de las Alas. One of the notable segments of the show is the revival of Star Circle Quest: Search for the Kiddie Idol, which is on its third season. It named Bugoy Cariño as the Grand Kiddie Questor, with Izzy Canillo as the first runner-up and child stars Eros Espiritu, Xyriel Manabat and Fatty Mendoza in the Top 5. Current Gimme 5 member Brace Arquiza also joined in this contest.

On October 23, 2009, the show aired its final episode, together with Pilipinas, Game Ka Na Ba?, due to its low ratings against its competitor. It was then replaced by Three Dads with One Mommy and Showtime on its timeslot. The show was the last morning talk show aired by ABS-CBN until the premiere of Simply KC.

== Hosts ==
Main hosts

- Ruffa Gutierrez
- Ai-Ai delas Alas

Guest host

- Charlene Gonzales (1 episode replacing Ai-Ai delas Alas)

== See also ==
- List of programs broadcast by ABS-CBN
