= Morning Star (talk show) =

2004–05 Philippine defunct television talk show of ABS-CBN

- Genre: Talk show
- Created by: ABS-CBN Corporation
- Developed by: ABS-CBN Corporation
- Written by: Boy Abunda
- Presented by: various hosts
- Country of origin: Philippines
- Original language: Filipino
- No. of episodes: 80

Production
- Running time: 30 minutes
- Production company: ABS-CBN Entertainment

Original release
- Network: ABS-CBN
- Release: October 11, 2004 – January 28, 2005

Related
- Good Morning, Kris; Homeboy

Morning Star is a Philippine television talk show broadcast by ABS-CBN. It aired from October 11, 2004 to January 28, 2005, replacing Good Morning, Kris and was replaced by Homeboy. The talk show was hosted by various ABS-CBN artists. It also served as the first talk show to be hosted by more than one artist from ABS-CBN. Since the show only served as a Christmas special, it lasted for only a mere 3 months.

== See also ==
- List of programs broadcast by ABS-CBN
