= Boy & Kris =

2007–09 Philippine television talk show

- Title card
- Genre: Lifestyle; Talk show
- Created by: ABS-CBN Corporation
- Developed by: ABS-CBN
- Written by: Ian Reyno
- Directed by: GB Sampedro
- Presented by: Boy Abunda; Kris Aquino
- Country of origin: Philippines
- Original language: Tagalog
- No. of episodes: 423

Production
- Executive producer: Tina Dela Merced
- Camera setup: Multiple-camera setup
- Running time: 60 minutes
- Production company: ABS-CBN Studios

Original release
- Network: ABS-CBN
- Release: July 2, 2007 – February 13, 2009

Related
- Homeboy; Ruffa & Ai; SNN: Showbiz News Ngayon; Aquino & Abunda Tonight

Boy & Kris is a Philippine television talk show broadcast by ABS-CBN. Hosted by Boy Abunda and Kris Aquino, it aired from July 2, 2007 to February 13, 2009, replacing Homeboy and was replaced by Ruffa & Ai.

Topics on the show ranges from personal concerns like relationships, finance and health concerns as well and other related matters.

"Boy is the information source and the objective in your face analyst who will approach any topic or issue squarely, whereas Kris is the opinionated other who will give an emotional tug to any issue or concern. Together, they are the yin and yang of morning talk to serve as the devil's advocate to one another and to provide a healthy balance of discussion items," said ABS-CBN Business Unit Head Louie Andrada.

Early January, there are rumors that ABS-CBN will move the talk show to a night timeslot. The hosts confirmed this news, as their talk show will be replaced by Ruffa & Ai to be hosted by Ruffa Gutierrez and Ai-Ai delas Alas. Meanwhile, Boy Abunda and Kris Aquino will be moving to Primetime Bida before Bandila for their new entertainment show titled SNN: Showbiz News Ngayon, from February 16, 2009.

== Overview ==
=== Production ===
After both separated in their shows temporarily when Aquino chose to quit The Buzz, a new show came to begin when Abunda find another opportunity to have Aquino again in morning shows. Also, Abunda wanted to save their friendship with Aquino after her leaving the said show. Meanwhile, ABS-CBN wanted to boost its Big Time Trio with the introduction of the new show.

The concept emerged when a year before the actual premier of the show. Abunda and Aquino both wanted to have a show like this. "We told ourselves, we should be doing a Mel and Jay-type show. It had always been in our minds [since then]." Abunda concluded his show Homeboy which aired for two-and-a-half years to accommodate the new one.

The new show is similar in format to The Buzz. However, unlike The Buzz, it will not focus on intrigues and gossip, but instead "provide meaningful information to the viewers".

Boy: We won’t veer away from the format too much. Except now we’re more fearless. I don’t think we [still] have to ... prove our capabilities as hosts. We are now more concerned about ... influencing, [and] communicating good values to the audience.
Kris: That comes [in part] from being comfortable with who you are ... and happy with what you’ve become. What can [viewers] expect? Walang takot na [unbarred] opinion that wouldn’t harm others.

=== Premiere ===
Commenced on July 2, 2007, the first week of the show touched on subjects like relationships. The leading episode featured three parent and child tandems: Judy Ann Santos and her mommy Carol; Luis Manzano and his father, actor and game show host Edu Manzano; and Ara Mina and her mother Frances Marie, a former beauty queen. The talk show is being aired from 10:30 to 11:30 in the morning before Pilipinas, Game KNB? where Aquino had her break before and Willie Revillame's Wowowee.

=== Reformat ===
The necessity came then when the shows rating was somewhat failing. While both hosts remains in the four corners of the studio, they wanted to have interviews outside to have a wider scope or coverage. The show's system however was not fully modified but was just introducing new portions.

=== Moving to Primetime ===
It was first published in ABS-CBN's website that Boy & Kris will be axed. Initially, the hosts denied these allegations. They defended the show by claiming they are currently leading in the ratings game nationwide. On February 3, 2009, they revealed that their show will be replaced by Ruffa Gutierrez and Ai-Ai delas Alas' new show, Ruffa & Ai. Boy and Kris meanwhile will be moving to primetime before Bandila for their new entertainment and lifestyle program Showbiz News Ngayon. These changes will be taking effect on February 16, 2009. Boy Abunda and Kris Aquino would later reunite to host Aquino & Abunda Tonight in 2014 until it ended the following year.

== Awards ==
- Winner, 2008 PMPC Star Awards for TV "Best Celebrity Talk Show"
- Winner, 2008 PMPC Star Awards for TV "Best Celebrity Talk Show Host" Boy Abunda & Kris Aquino
- Winner, 2009 New York Festival SILVER Medal for Talk/Interview Show
- Nominated, 2009 PMPC Star Awards for TV "Best Celebrity Talk Show Host"

== See also ==
- List of programs broadcast by ABS-CBN
