= Math-Tinik =

Philippine educational television series

- Title card
- Genre: Children's television series Educational
- Written by: Catherina Calzo-Fournier; Andrea delos Reyes
- Directed by: Rowie E. Concepcion; Rene Guidote; Paul Daza; Christopher Sioco
- Starring: Angela Garcia; Lorena Garcia; Huey Remulla; Claudine Alejandro; Mark Guayco
- Theme music composer: Ting-ting Calzo-Fournier; Jungee Marcelo
- Opening theme: "Math-Tinik Theme" by Cris Villonco
- Ending theme: "Math-Tinik Theme" (instrumental)
- Composers: Noel Argosino; Froilan Malimban; Noel Manalo
- Country of origin: Philippines
- Original language: Tagalog

Production
- Executive producers: Ma. Cielo S. Reyes; Mariles H. Gonzales
- Producer: Gina L. Lopez
- Editors: Ding Mora; Noemi Cariaso; Chris Sioco; Manny Diolazo
- Running time: 30 minutes
- Production companies: ABS-CBN Foundation; Department of Education, Culture and Sports

Original release
- Network: ABS-CBN
- Release: January 7, 1997 – August 3, 2004

Math-Tinik (lit. 'math-thorn'; stylized as MATH-Tinik, a pun on the word “Matinik” which literally translates to “Thorny” but is often used to mean ‘sharp’ in terms of mental acuity) is a Philippine television educational show by ABS-CBN. Hosted by Angela Garcia, Lorena Garcia, Huey Remulla, Claudine Alejandro and Mark Guayco, it aired from January 7, 1997 to August 3, 2004.

== Cast ==
- Angela Garcia as Ms. Math-Tinik
- Lorena Garcia as Sheila Mae
- Huey Remulla as Charlie
- Claudine Alejandro as Patricia
- Mark Guayco as Joey

Introduced in 2000

- Herbie Go as Artmetic

== Production ==
The series' headwriters are Catherina Calzo-Fournier and Andrea Delos Reyes, with the former later becoming editor-in-chief of the Pinas newspaper. One of the episode directors is Rene Guidote, who has also directed Sine'skwela, Bayani, Pahina and other educational series made by ABS-CBN Foundation. As with other educational television programs from the ABS-CBN Foundation and DECS, a single episode of Math-Tinik took between three and nine months to make from conception to approval.

=== Music ===
The "Math-Tinik Theme" was sung by Cris Villonco, with lyrics by Ting-ting Calzo-Fournier and music composed by Jungee Marcelo. The series composers were Noel Argosino, Froilan Malimban, and Noel Manalo, who also provided sound effects for the series.

In the 1999 episode "Numeration", the song "Numerals" was composed by Liezel Ann Tiamzon. In the 2000 episode "Time and Calendar", the song "Time and Calendar" was also composed by Tiamzon, sung by Caloy Santos Jr.

== See also ==
- Sine'skwela
- Hiraya Manawari
- Bayani
- Epol/Apple
