= SNN: Showbiz News Ngayon =

2009–11 Philippine television entertainment news show

- Genre: Entertainment news
- Directed by: Arnel Natividad
- Presented by: Boy Abunda; Bianca Gonzalez
- Country of origin: Philippines
- Original language: Filipino
- No. of episodes: 680

Production
- Running time: 30 minutes
- Production companies: ABS-CBN Studios; ABS-CBN News and Current Affairs

Original release
- Network: ABS-CBN
- Release: February 16, 2009 – September 9, 2011

Related
- Boy & Kris; Cristy Per Minute; Aquino & Abunda Tonight; Tonight with Boy Abunda

SNN: Showbiz News Ngayon (SNN: Showbiz News Now/Today) is a Philippine television entertainment news broadcasting show broadcast by ABS-CBN. Originally anchored by Boy Abunda and Kris Aquino, it aired on the network's Primetime Bida line up from February 16, 2009 to September 9, 2011, replacing Pinoy Fear Factor and was replaced by Nasaan Ka, Elisa?. Abunda and Bianca Gonzalez served as the final anchors.

== Format ==
The show begins with a news segment identified as the topic of the evening's poll question, which home viewers can vote for through text messaging. The results of the informal poll is revealed at the end of the show. On its first year, a new segment, "Isang Tanong, Isang Sagot," was introduced. It aims to answer showbiz questions taken from Twitter and Facebook followers of the show on or before the show ends.

== Cast ==
=== Main anchors ===
- Boy Abunda (2009–2011)
- Bianca Gonzalez (2010–2011)

=== Reporters ===
- Mario Dumaual
- Gretchen Fullido
- Cesca Litton
- Ginger Conejero
- MJ Felipe

=== Former anchors ===
- Kris Aquino (2009–2010)

=== Fill-in anchors ===
- Toni Gonzaga (2010)
- Mariel Rodriguez (2010)

== Production ==
The Buzz hosts Boy Abunda and Kris Aquino were placed as the new anchors of this program and it aired its first episode on February 16, 2009. During this time, their morning talk show Boy & Kris was at the peak of the ratings game. Once they were tapped as the new anchors, the talk show was then placed by another with Ruffa Gutierrez and Ai-Ai delas Alas as the new hosts in the show Ruffa & Ai.

In 2010, Kris Aquino decided to take a leave from SNN to campaign for her brother Noynoy Aquino who is running for the presidency, during which time Toni Gonzaga, Mariel Rodriguez and Bianca Gonzalez were guest anchors. Aquino announced that she will be leaving SNN and The Buzz near the end of June to spend time with her family and not cause issues while her brother is in office as president. In 2010, Bianca Gonzalez, who was a guest host and temporary fill-in for Aquino, permanently replaced her to join Abunda. On September 9, 2011, SNN aired its final broadcast as Boy Abunda will now join Bandila.

== Awards ==
- 23rd PMPC Star Awards for Television: Best Showbiz-Oriented Show
- Boy Abunda for "Best Male Showbiz-Oriented Talk Show Host" in the 23rd PMPC Star Awards for TV

== See also ==
- List of programs broadcast by ABS-CBN
