= Ermin Garcia =

Ermin Erfe Garcia Sr. (April 25, 1921 in San Fabian – May 20, 1966 in Dagupan) was a Filipino journalist and newspaper publisher.

A street along Barangay Eulogio Rodriguez, Quezon City was named after him.

== Career ==
During the campaign to liberate the Philippines, Garcia has published small-scale newspaper, The Pioneer Herald. The Allies between the combined Filipino and American forces were so impressed by the paper that they bought 100,000 copies, and airdropped copies over still-occupied territories.

As a newspaper publisher after the war, he was known for fighting against corruption in the Philippine government. This recognition allowed him to take up a Rotary scholarship to study journalism at Columbia University. After returning to the Philippines, he began the magazine Counterpoint, and later copublished Freedom Magazine with Salvador Zaide.

On July 15, 1956, he founded the Sunday Punch magazine, through which he continued his fight against corruption and other dubious practices in society.

On May 20, 1966, Garcia was shot dead in his office by two hitmen in Dagupan, Pangasinan. The next edition of the Sunday Punch revealed that Garcia was working on exposing the illegal practices of some local politicians at the time, and that the killing was most likely related.

His son, Ermin Jr. took over the management of the Sunday Punch in 1968.

== Education and personal life ==
Ermin Garcia was born on April 25, 1925, in San Fabian, Pangasinan. He received a bachelor's degree in literature from the Ateneo de Manila University.

Garcia was married to Paulita Fernandez. Together the couple had five children, including his namesake Ermin Garcia Jr., who succeeded his father as publisher of the Punch.
