= Tonight with Boy Abunda =

2015–20 Philippine television talk show

- Title card
- Also known as: TWBA
- Genre: Late-night talk show Entertainment news Commentary
- Developed by: ABS-CBN Corporation
- Written by: Karen Abrenica
- Directed by: Arnel Natividad
- Presented by: Boy Abunda
- Country of origin: Philippines
- Original languages: Filipino (primary); English (secondary)
- No. of episodes: 1,156 (final)

Production
- Executive producer: Nancy Yabut
- Production locations: Studio 8, ABS-CBN Broadcasting Center, Quezon City, Philippines
- Camera setup: Multiple-camera setup
- Production company: ABS-CBN Studios

Original release
- Network: ABS-CBN
- Release: September 28, 2015 – May 4, 2020

Related
- Aquino & Abunda Tonight; SNN: Showbiz News Ngayon; The Bottomline with Boy Abunda; Ikaw Na! (segment from Bandila); Fast Talk with Boy Abunda

Tonight with Boy Abunda is a Philippine television talk show broadcast by ABS-CBN. Hosted by Boy Abunda, it aired on the network's Primetime Bida line up from September 28, 2015 to May 4, 2020, replacing Aquino & Abunda Tonight.

== Format ==
Similar to its predecessor, the show gives a run-down of daily top stories with topics raging from showbiz, lifestyle, homosexuality and politics, with the promise to deliver its segments "from layman's point of view", and with perspectives on how certain issues can affect viewers' daily lives.

== Final hosts ==
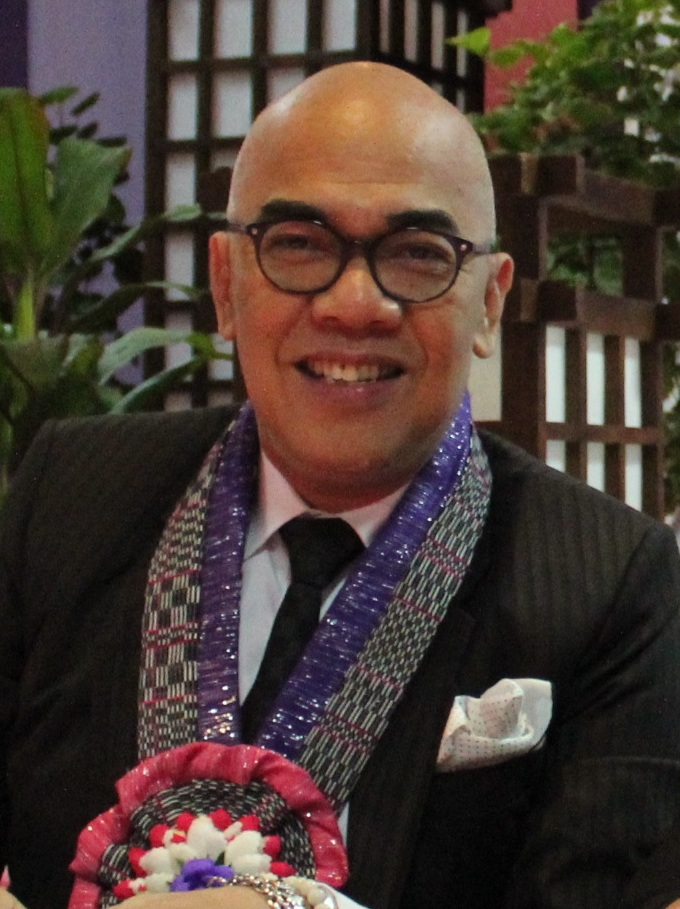
Boy Abunda served as the host.

- Boy Abunda

== Final segments ==
- Life Line
- Hot Seat
- Fast Talk
- Golden Mirror
- 5 in 45
- T.M.I. The Main Issue
- The A List
- The TWBA Test: Tama o Mali
- 2 Be Honest
- Sinong Guilty?
- POPster Quiz
- Legit or Lie

== Production ==
The show suspended the production of its new episodes and aired re-runs from March 16 to May 4, 2020, due to the Luzon enhanced community quarantine caused by the COVID-19 pandemic in the Philippines until the network's shutdown due to the cease and desist order by the National Telecommunications Commission (NTC), following the expiration of the network's 25-year franchise granted in 1995. However, the current status of the talk show remained unknown until it was replaced by The World Tonight on July 27, 2020. The show eventually did not go back on-air as Boy Abunda returned to GMA Network on December 15, 2022.
