= Ted Failon =

Filipino broadcast journalist, radio commentator, and talk show host (born 1962)

The Honorable Ted Failon
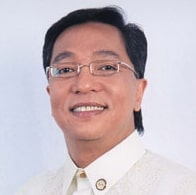
- Official portrait, 2001

Member of the House of Representatives from Leyte's 1st district
- In office June 30, 2001 – June 30, 2004
- Preceded by: Alfred Romualdez
- Succeeded by: Remedios Petilla

Personal details
- Born: Mario Teodoro Failon Etong; March 29, 1962 (age 64) Manila, Philippines
- Party: Independent (2001–2004)
- Spouse: Trinidad "Trina" Arteche (m. 1985; died 2009)
- Children: 2
- Education: Colegio de San Juan de Letran; Divine Word University of Tacloban; Polytechnic University of the Philippines (BA); Arellano University (Did not finish)
- Occupation: Broadcast Journalist, anchor, radio commentator
- TV/radio shows hosted: Aksyon Ngayon anchor (1991–1996); Hoy Gising! anchor (1992–2001); Tambalang Failon at Sanchez anchor (1995–2001; 2004–2009); TV Patrol anchor (2004–2020); Radyo Patrol Balita anchor (2004–2020); Harapan host (2008–2009); Failon Ngayon host (2009–2020); Tambalang Failon at Webb anchor (2009–2011); Failon Ngayon sa DZMM/TeleRadyo commentator (2011–2020); Ted Failon at DJ Chacha sa True FM commentator (2020–present); Radyo5 Network News anchor (2020–2023); Gud Morning Kapatid anchor (2024–2026); Frontline sa Umaga anchor (2025–present)
- Nickname(s): Mr. Failon, Ted, Manong Ted

Mario Teodoro "Ted" Failon Etong (Tagalog: [pɐjˈlɔn ˈʔɛtoŋ, ˈfaɪ-]; born March 29, 1962) is a Filipino broadcast journalist and former politician. He served as a representative of the 1st district of Leyte from 2001 to 2004. He is currently under contract with TV5, hosting Ted Failon at DJ Chacha sa True FM on 105.9 True FM and Frontline sa Umaga on the former.

A broadcast journalist previously for ABS-CBN, he previously presented news for Radyo Patrol Balita Alas-Siyete alongside Noli de Castro, and on his own program Failon Ngayon sa DZMM (later Failon Ngayon sa TeleRadyo). He also presented Hoy Gising!, the nightly news program TV Patrol (formerly TV Patrol World) from 2004 to 2020, and his own investigative program Failon Ngayon on television.

== Education ==
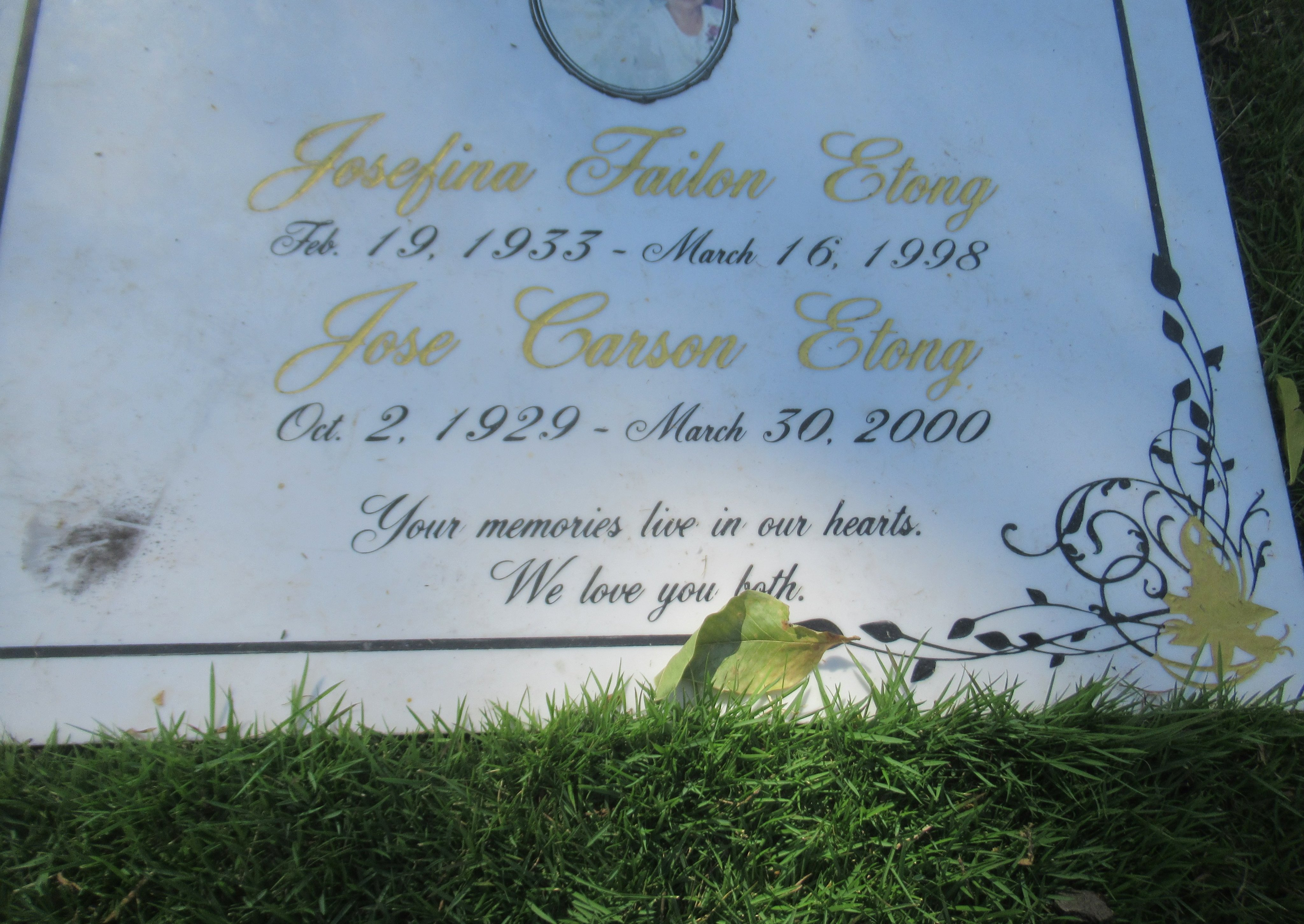
Failon's parents' grave at Manila Memorial Park – Sucat.

Failon completed his elementary education at Sacred Heart High School in Tacloban in 1974. As a high school student, he worked as a room boy in Tacloban, a waiter, and a construction worker to help his family make ends meet. He completed his secondary education at Perpetual Help College of Rizal in Las Piñas in 1979. He later studied economics at Colegio de San Juan de Letran, during which he worked as a disc jockey (DJ), before transferring to Divine Word University to study mass communication. However, he did not complete his studies at either institution, as he also left school upon marriage in 1985. Failon finally graduated in 1996, earning his broadcast communication degree at the Polytechnic University of the Philippines. He also pursued law at the Arellano Law Foundation but did not finish the program.

== Career ==
Failon worked for DYPL-AM, based in Tacloban, as a driver and reporter in 1982, announcer and production head from 1983 to 1987, and station manager from 1987 to 1988. He later moved to Angeles City, where he became the program director of DWGV-FM from 1988 to 1990.

Failon joined ABS-CBN Broadcasting Corporation in 1990 as a news desk editor. He later became a radio anchor for DZMM and ABS-CBN News' executive producer and anchor. He later became the host and executive producer of the morning television show Hoy Gising. He became the radio news manager for DZMM in 1995. He entered politics as the representative of Leyte's 1st district from 2001 to 2004; in the 2001 elections, he defeated incumbent Alfred Romualdez and later won the electoral protest filed against him by the latter. While serving his term in Congress, he continued at ABS-CBN as a part-time DZMM anchor and host of Good News on ANC.

After his congressional term, he returned as a full-time journalist for ABS-CBN as a DZMM anchor. He was named as anchor of the revamped TV Patrol World (now TV Patrol) in 2004. He later became the host of his own investigative program Failon Ngayon in 2009 and Krusada in 2010. On August 30, 2020, ABS-CBN management confirmed that Failon decided to part ways with the network. He made his final appearance on TV Patrol and Failon Ngayon sa TeleRadyo on August 31.

Failon signed with TV5 on September 11, 2020. He later became the host of Ted Failon at DJ Chacha sa Radyo5 (now True FM) alongside Czarina Marie Guevara (widely known as DJ Chacha, also previously from ABS-CBN) on Radyo5 92.3 News FM (later 105.9 True FM effective November 2024). On October 21, 2024, the radio program's newscast segment was simulcast on Gud Morning Kapatid via TV5 and RPTV, making him and Guevara co-hosts of the morning show. This simulcast was later carried over to Frontline sa Umaga on August 10, 2026.

== Personal life ==
Failon married Trinidad Arteche in 1985. The couple had two daughters: Kaye (born 1985) and Karishma (born 1996). In 2009, his wife, aged 44, committed suicide in their family residence in Tierra Pura Homes, Quezon City.

=== Investigation ===
In May 2009, the DOJ's Quezon City prosecutors’ office dismissed the Quezon City Police District criminal complaint for obstruction of justice against Failon, his driver, houseboy, nanny, housemaid and Trinidad’s sister Pamela Arteche. Earlier, Failon underwent criminal investigation in Camp Karingal. The NBI found Trinidad Arteche-Etong committed suicide. It sustained Failon's allegations that she committed suicide due to financial problems. The NBI's Neuro Psychiatric Section's psychological autopsy found Trinidad suffered constant insomnia with major depressive disorder. She suffered gunshot wound inside a bathroom of their house inside Tierra Pura Homes in Tandang Sora, Culiat, Quezon City in April 15 and died at the New Era General Hospital. In September 2011, an Information was filed against five Quezon City Police District officers with Judge Marie Christine Jacob, Quezon City Regional Trial Court, Branch 100 for violation of Section 2 (b), R.A. 7438. In March 2016, in a 22-page joint decision, Judge Genie Gapas-Agbada of the Quezon City Regional Trial Court Branch 100 acquitted the five police officers.

In April 2014, advocacy group Kilusan Kontra Kabulukan at Katiwalian (4K) vehemently opposed the immediate conclusion of Trinidad Etong suicide case. 4K questioned the kasambahay's cleaning of the crime scene, the early and unexplained presence of Globe Asiatique's Delfin Lee before the arrival of the PNP SOCO and left-handed Trinidad's negativity for paraffin test or gunshot residue from the subject Walther PK380.

=== Legal issues ===
In July 2020, the Court of Appeals's Justice Pablito A. Perez, Twelfth Division denied the defamation complaint filed by Senator Francis Tolentino against Failon. The 2017 case stemmed from Failon's commentary of possible misuse of public funds when MMDA Tolentino purchased used motorcycles. The appellate court ordered the Cavite Regional Trial Court, Branch 18 to dismiss the criminal proceedings.

In July 2024, the Supreme Court has dismissed the indirect contempt against Failon. The court held that Failon's interview in a pending case between Satur Ocampo and Leandro Mendoza with STRADCOM Corporation is not contumacious and protected by the freedom of speech.

== Awards and nominations ==
| Year | Award giving body | Category | Nominated work | Results |
|---|---|---|---|---|
| 2000 | PMPC Star Awards for Television | Best Public Service Program Host | Hoy Gising! | Won |

House of Representatives of the Philippines
| Preceded by Alfred Romualdez | Member of the Philippine House of Representatives from Leyte's 1st District; June 30, 2001–June 30, 2004 | Succeeded by Remedios Petilla |
