= Epol/Apple =

Philippine educational television show

- Title card
- Genre: Children's television series
- Written by: Sarah Fernando Lumba
- Directed by: Paul Daza; Rene Guidote; Marinette Lusanta
- Theme music composer: Gina Fernandez; Jim Paredes
- Opening theme: "Epol/Apple Theme" by Jim Paredes and Lynn Sherman
- Ending theme: "Epol/Apple Theme" (instrumental)
- Composers: Noel Argosino; Froilan Malimban
- Country of origin: Philippines
- Original language: Taglish

Production
- Executive producer: Marcela Claudette V. Sevilla
- Producer: Gina Lopez
- Editors: Noemi Cariaso-Mora; Rommel Malimban; Joel Barquez; Christopher Sioco; Aaron Teaño; Noah Lacinlao; Karl Joseph Mayshle; Simmon "Mon" Faigal
- Running time: 30 minutes
- Production companies: ABS-CBN Foundation; Department of Education, Culture and Sports (DECS), now Department of Education

Original release
- Network: ABS-CBN
- Release: June 8, 1999 – July 29, 2004

Epol/Apple is a Philippine television educational show by ABS-CBN. It aired from June 8, 1999 to July 29, 2004. It is the ABS-CBN's only educational television series in English but it is bilingual with Tagalog.

== Cast ==
- Emman Abeleda as Kenneth
- Bryan Homecillo as Rap-Rap
- Marick Dacanay as Mary Grace
- Jiro Manio as Jiro
- Nina de Sagun as Jeanne/Joan
- Joseph Lindo Roble as Otep
- Toots Javellana as Porfirio
- Bodjie Pascua as Kuya/Tito Luis
- Audie Gemora as Miguel
- Isa Fabregas as Kiara
- Mikaela Lagdameo-Martinez as Pilar
- Monique Wilson
- Julia Clarete
- Apollo Sheikh Abraham
- Icko Gonzalez
- Andrew Cruz
- Luigi Nacario

== Production ==
The series' headwriter is Sarah Fernando Lumba. One of the episode directors is Rene Guidote, who has also directed Sine'skwela, Bayani, Pahina and other educational series made by ABS-CBN Foundation. As with other educational television programs from the ABS-CBN Foundation and DECS, a single episode of Epol/Apple took between three and nine months to make from conception to approval.

In 2001, Bodjie Pascua as Luis replaced Audie Gemora as Miguel while Emman Abeleda, Marick Dacanay and Toots Javellana were retained from the 1st Season of the series.

=== Music ===
The "Epol/Apple Theme" was sung by Jim Paredes and Lynn Sherman, with lyrics by Gina Fernandez and music arranged by Paredes. The series composers were Noel Argosino and Froilan Malimban, who also provided sound effects for the series. The song "Goodbye My Friend" was written by headwriter Sarah Fernando Lumba and composed by Liezel Anne Tiamzon.

In the 2002 episode about introductions, the song "What Is Your Name?" was written by Libay Linsangan-Cantor and arranged by Tiamzon. In the first episode about ownership, the song "Is That Your ______?" was written by Dang Bagas and arranged by Mike Mella, while in the second episode about ownership, the song "Are Those Your Toys ______?" was written by Divine Love Salvador and also arranged by Mella.

Partial list of songs

Title	Lyricist	Composer/Arranger	Source
"Epol/Apple Theme"	Gina Fernandez	Jim Paredes	
"Goodbye My Friend"	Sarah Fernando Lumba	Liezel Anne Tiamzon	
"Are Those Your Toys ______?"	Divine Love Salvador	Mike Mella	
"How Old Are You?"	Divine Love Salvador	Mike Mella	
"Is That Your ______?"	Dang Bagas	Mike Mella	
"What Is Your Name?"	Libay Linsangan-Cantor	Liezel Anne Tiamzon	
"Where Do You Live?"	Andrea Guevarra delos Reyes	Liezel Anne Tiamzon	
"Where Do You Study?"	Divine Love Salvador	Mike Mella	

== Accolades ==
Year	Award	Category	Result	Ref.
2002	Southeast Asian Foundation for Children's Television	Citation	N/A	
2000-2004	ANAK TV SEAL	ANAK TV SEAL	Won	

== Reruns ==
Reruns of the show are currently aired on ABS-CBN-owned educational channel Knowledge Channel from the channel's launch in 1999.

From June 13 to September 5, 2020, reruns of the show were aired on Kapamilya Channel.

== See also ==
- Sine'skwela
- Hiraya Manawari
- Bayani
- Math-Tinik
