= Failon Ngayon =

2009–20 Philippine television news magazine program

- Final title card used from 2019–2020
- Genre: Documentary; Public affairs; Public service; Investigative news
- Presented by: Ted Failon
- Country of origin: Philippines
- Original language: Filipino
- No. of episodes: 555

Production
- Production company: ABS-CBN News and Current Affairs

Original release
- Network: ABS-CBN
- Release: October 24, 2009 – May 2, 2020

Failon Ngayon (lit. 'failon now') is a Philippine television documentary show broadcast by ABS-CBN. Hosted by Ted Failon, it aired on the network's Yes Weekend line up from October 24, 2009 to May 2, 2020.

== History ==
=== Overview ===
The show offered investigative reports, public service, features and stories of national importance taken from the viewpoint of individual/s involved with or in conflict with various issues. Failon brings his wit, humor and intelligent analysis to national issues that negatively affects the Filipinos, with the mantra "Sa Mga Isyu ng Bayan, Lahat Tayo Sila may Pakialam!" (lit. In the Nation's Issues, Everyone Needs they to Know!) in mind.

=== 2009–2015: as a late-afternoon show ===
Failon Ngayon premiered on October 24, 2009 as one of the new shows unveiled by ABS-CBN, along with It's Showtime. It also served as lead-in to TV Patrol Sabado (now TV Patrol Weekend) which was anchored by Alex Santos and Bernadette Sembrano.

Initially, the show was formatted as an extension of the Tambalan radio program co-hosted by Failon and Korina Sanchez, featuring a mix of analysis on topical serious issues and public service reports. On select weeks, it also catered to celebrity interviews and humorous features, emulating the styles of American late-night talk shows.

The show was then produced within the ABS-CBN studios with Failon as host and Zhander Cayabyab (who later became a DZMM reporter) as his sidekick, soundman and humor features reporter.

In September 2011, the program reformatted to become more documentary-investigative leaning with several topics discussed over multiple weeks. To cater to the new format, Failon mostly ventured outside the studio as a pre-taped program with additional man-on-the street interviews.

=== 2015–2020: as a late-night program ===
On November 21, 2015, the show moved to a late-evening slot, trading timeslots with Celebrity Playtime and served as a lead-in to The Bottomline with Boy Abunda.

The program's eventual final episode aired on May 2, 2020, as a week later the show suspended airings due the network's shutdown because of the cease and desist order by the National Telecommunications Commission (NTC) following the expiration five days prior of the network's 25-year franchise granted in 1995.

On July 15, 2020, the current affairs division's documentary section of ABS-CBN News, including the staff of the program became part of the series of retrenchments following the denial of its congressional franchise on July 10, which officially canceled the program. However, its sister radio program continued airing until August 31, when Failon left the network and transferred to TV5 on September 11 alongside DJ Chacha, with their new radio program entitled Ted Failon at DJ Chacha sa Radyo5 (now Ted Failon at DJ Chacha sa True FM), which premiered on October 5.

== Final hosts ==
- Ted Failon

== Awards and nominations ==
Year	Award	Category	Work	Result
2013	Association for International Broadcasting	Domestic Current Affairs Documentary	Cast and crew	Special Citation
2012	34th Catholic Mass Media Awards	Best News Magazine Program	Cast and crew	Special Citation
