= Sine'skwela =

Philippine children's television series

- Genre: Children's television series Educational
- Created by: Sine'skwela Creative Committee
- Written by: Lem Garcellano; Froilan Medina; Deo Noveno; Aileen Suquila Santos; Jovy Zarate
- Directed by: Noel Añonuevo; Rowena Concepcion; Rene Guidote
- Theme music composer: Ryan Cayabyab
- Opening theme: "Sine'skwela Theme Song" by Ryan Cayabyab and The Music Studio
- Ending theme: "Sine'skwela Theme Song" (instrumental)
- Composers: Dan Gil; Geri Gatchalian-Gil; Noel Manalo; Liezel Tiamzon
- Country of origin: Philippines
- Original language: Filipino

Production
- Executive producers: Mariles H. Gonzales; Frederick Esteves; Carina A. Villanoz
- Producer: Gina L. Lopez
- Editors: Christopher Sioco; Gerry Constantino; Noemi G. Cariaso; Manny Diolazo III; Genesis Gutierrez; Rizaldy Mora
- Running time: 30 minutes
- Production companies: ABS-CBN Foundation; DOST Science Education Institute; Department of Education, Culture and Sports (1994-2001); Department of Education (2001-2004, 2007-2010)

Original release
- Network: ABS-CBN
- Release: June 6, 1994 – July 30, 2004
- Network: Studio 23
- Release: 2007 – 2009

Sine'skwela (lit. 'movie-school', a portmanteau of the Filipino words "sine" and "eskwela"), alternatively known as School on Air, is a Philippine television educational show by ABS-CBN and Studio 23. It aired on ABS-CBN from June 6, 1994 to July 30, 2004. The show, moved to Studio 23 from 2007 to 2009 and returned to ABS-CBN from 2009 to 2010. The show aims to educate children about science.

Some episodes of the show are available for streaming online on YouTube, via Knowledge Channel.

== Format ==
Sine'skwela is a curriculum-based show, in line with the science classes of public elementary students from Grade 2 to 6 in the Philippines. The Department of Education mandated that the show will be used as a reference for school classes and be screened at least once a week. The episodes does not only focus on basic library research but also on conducted laboratory experiments and field investigations.

== Presentation ==
Sine'skwela simplified the complicated principles of science and technology by casting animated characters, dramatization and colorful visual effects. It also taught children the practical application of science in everyday life. Originally the show cast had been subsequently changed yearly on a basis during the run of the program, the original concept which runs on a segment-by-segment manner from 1994 till 1995 when the conceptualization of segments and scenarios of the script which now based on an academic approval from the Department of Education from 1996 the end of the run.

== Cast ==
=== Regular cast ===
- Jon Santos
- Tom Taus
- John Prats
- Camille Prats
- Antoinette Taus
- Paula Peralejo
- Audie Gemora
- Kristoffer Peralta
- Panjee Gonzalez as Ate Stella
- Marco Ballesteros
- Christine Bersola as Herself/Anatom
- Brenan Espartinez as Himself/Agatom
- Sheena Ramos as Herself/Palikpik
- Maan Munsayac as Herself/Kulitsap
- Ding Lucina
- Icko Gonzalez as Kuya Bok
- Roobak Valle as Ugat-Puno
- Kjell Villamarin
- Idelle Martinez
- Allyzon Lualhati
- Giselle Sanchez
- Winnie Cordero as Teacher Wackee / Ate Winnie
- Agatha Tapan as Mai-Mai
- Ricardo Flores as Migo
- BJ Rodriguez
- John Wayne Sace as Emilio
- Soliman Cruz as Mang Anding
- Hazel Ann Mendoza as Hazel
- Ms. Stella Cañete as Ate Joy
- Gerard Pizarras as Kuya Joel
- Bryan Homecillo as Elvis
- Bea Nicolas as Tala
- Maureen Guese as Kakai
- Lovely Rivero
- Shiela May Junsay as Binhi
- John Manalo as Pepe
- Bombi Plata as Kuya Buhawi
- Nikki Bagaporo as Inday

=== Guest cast ===
- Julius Babao
- Joji Isla
- Lou Veloso
- Jun Urbano
- Lester Llansang
- Rez Cortez
- John Arcilla
- Jaime Fabregas
- Jon Achaval
- Ces Quesada
- Alwyn Uytingco
- L.A. Lopez
- Carlo Aquino
- Stefano Mori
- Archie Adamos as DOH Officer - "Avian Flu" episode (2007)
- Ernie Zarate
- Marc Solis
- Bon Vibar
- Michael V.
- Candy Pangilinan
- Mon Ilagan
- Gus Abelgas
- Erwin Tulfo
- Jao Mapa
- Gio Alvarez
- Mitch Valdez
- Tuesday Vargas as Honey - "Simple Machines" episode (2008)
- Nanette Inventor
- Noel Trinidad
- Subas Herrero
- Benjie Felipe
- Empoy Marquez as Barangay Tanod - "Biofuels" episode (2007)
- Arvin "Tado" Jimenez as Marjo - "Biofuels" episode (2007)
- Bob dela Cruz as Mang Tomas - "Avian Flu" episode (2007)
- Kim Atienza as Weather Presenter - "Tropical Cyclone" episode (2007)
- Bodjie Pascua
- Ernie Baron
- Jinky Oda
- Frances Makil

== Production and broadcast ==
The Sine'skwela Creative Committee made the concept for the television series in 1993. The committee was composed of an executive producer, a science research coordinator, a head writer, and consultants from the Department of Education, Culture and Sports (DECS, later became the Department of Education or DepEd), the Department of Science and Technology (DOST) and the University of the Philippines Institute for Science and Mathematics Education Development (UP ISMED). There are five stages in the process of producing an episode. Sine'skwela was first aired on June 13, 1994, and its success led to the production of similar educational shows such as Hiraya Manawari, Math-Tinik, Epol/Apple and Bayani. Sine'skwela aired its final episode in 2004.

It then moved to ABS-CBN's UHF channel, Studio 23 in 2007, with episodes about tropical cyclones (with TV Patrol World (now TV Patrol) weatherman Kim Atienza making a cameo/guest appearance) and the Avian flu (with Bob dela Cruz making a guest appearance), and then returned on ABS-CBN from 2009 until 2010.

== Re-runs ==
In 1999, the show's episodes started to rerun on Knowledge Channel. On March 28, 2020, the show's episodes were rerun on ABS-CBN as part of the programming change the network made due to the COVID-19 pandemic in the Philippines.

== Accolades ==
Sine'skwela was awarded the Priz de Jeunesse at the 20th Television Science Programme in Paris, France in 2003. The winning episode, titled "Polluted Waters" and directed by John Red, featured the Pasig River as its subject and how human activity contributes to its degradation.
