= Bayani (TV series) =

Philippine educational television series

- Genre: Historical fantasy Educational
- Directed by: Noel Añonuevo, Cesar Celestino and Rene Guidote
- Starring: Angelo Cometa; Mara Babor; Celine Lirio; Agatha Tapan; Caridad Sanchez; Rolando Santos Tinio; Malou de Guzman
- Opening theme: "Bayani" by Brenan Espartinez and Maita Ponce
- Ending theme: "Bayani" by Brenan Espartinez and Maita Ponce
- Composers: Ditoy Aguila and Noel Zarate
- Country of origin: Philippines
- Original language: Filipino

Production
- Executive producers: Maria Cielo Reyes and Carina Villanoz
- Producer: Gina L. Lopez
- Running time: 30 minutes
- Production company: ABS-CBN Foundation

Original release
- Network: ABS-CBN
- Release: October 11, 1995 – 2001

Bayani (transl. hero) is a Philippine television educational series by ABS-CBN. Hosted by Angelo Cometa, Mara Babor, Celine Lirio, Agatha Tapan, Caridad Sanchez, Rolando Santos Tinio and Malou de Guzman, it aired from October 11, 1995 to 2001.

The show revolves around two Grade 4 to 6 school children who discovers a cave where they meet a mysterious elder who tasks them to go back in time to relive certain events to witness the heroism of select figures in Philippine history.

The Department of Education has endorsed Bayani, together with the other educational television shows developed by ABS-CBN Foundation (formerly ABS-CBN Lingkod Kapamilya Foundation), as part of regular class activities.

== Background ==
Bayani dramatizes historical events and the lives of Filipino historical heroes as well as their accomplishments from the perspective of elementary/middle school students named Noli, Aya, and Ana, and later Manuel, Rolan, and Lisa, who magically travel back in time to retrieve historical items for an elderly person. Their travels enable them to meet famous Filipino heroes including José Rizal, Andrés Bonifacio, Apolinario Mabini, Emilio Jacinto, Melchora Aquino, Antonio Luna, Diego Silang and his wife, Gabriela Silang, Teresa Magbanua, Josefa Llanes Escoda, Gomburza, Graciano López Jaena, Gregorio del Pilar, Hermano Pule, Marcelo H. del Pilar, Lapulapu, Macario Sakay, Datu Ali, José Abad Santos, Teodoro Asedillo amongst others.

The series also delved into the lives of leading lights in Philippine arts and literature, including Aurelio Tolentino, Francisco Balagtas, Juan Luna, Huseng Batute, Nicanor Abelardo as well as National Artists Atang de la Rama and Francisca Reyes-Aquino.

In comparison to other educational series, the show discussed the important contributions of contemporary heroes primarily on various aspects of civics education including Ermin Garcia on the freedom of the press, Sajid Bulig on the importance of the youth, Roselle Ambubuyog on the rights of persons with disabilities, Rhona Mahilum on the importance of family, and Fely Tatlonghari on the rights of suffrage (voting rights) and services of teachers during election season as canvassers and poll workers. The series also placed importance on the heroes and martyrs of the Marcos' martial law regime particularly on the episodes on Ditto Sarmiento, Remberto "Bobby" de la Paz, and Macli-ing Dulag.

It has also featured several episodes on the collective heroism of people, including the Battle of Balangiga, the Mutiny of the Tayabas Regiment, the Women of Malolos, the Philex miners during the 1990 Luzon earthquake, Beth Baybayan's team from Department of Social Welfare and Development (DSWD) during the 1991 eruption of Mount Pinatubo and the People Power Revolution that ousted the dictator Ferdinand Marcos Sr. in 1986.

== Main setting ==
The first episode of the show had Noli and his friend Aya, both fourth graders, hiding in a mountain cave while fleeing from a gang of bullies during their walk home from school. In the cave, a chains-bound elderly man (Rolando Tinio) meets them and presents himself as the hermit guardian of the cave which holds the memories of Philippine history and the spirit of the country. He then reveals that Noli and Ana were destined to discover the mysterious cave and are chosen ones of pure heart to access a heavy book known as "Aklat ng Kasaysayan at kabayanihan " (Book of History). The Guardian then sends them on a magical adventure through time to retrieve various lost and stolen historical items from different time periods. At the end of each travel, the two schoolchildren return with the artifacts (in the case of the first episode, the first fan made by Andres Bonifacio) and presents them to the guardian, who later becomes a grandfather figure to the children.

Throughout the series, the main setting for the beginning and ending of each episodes is a cave and elderly person is a male. An elderly woman appeared in the next few episodes and also becomes a grandmother figure to the children who visited the cave. After Tinio's death in 1997, the elderly woman becomes a mainstay guardian and the cave's secret holder, while retaining the Book of History.

In the later episodes, the show departed from the cave setting to newer areas including various locations (e.g. Museo Pambata and National Library of the Philippines) and a new mainstay guardian in the form of the children's aunt is introduced. although the Book of History is still retained. An example of this change is reflected in the Rhona Mahilum episode; the show begins in a forest where Noli and Ana camp, and the ending is set in the hospital where the episode's title character is admitted.

When the actors for Noli and Ana outgrew their roles, the next episodes introduced new child characters Manuel, Rolan, and Lisa, while the aunt guardian and Book of History are retained. This continued until the finale episode, "Beth Baybayan".

== Cast ==
=== Original characters ===
- Angelo Cometa as Noli - the male lead of the series. Cometa played the character which was later cut off or written out of the series following Episode 75 after he outgrew his role and aged out of middle school age.
- Celine Lirio as Aya - Noli's friend and female lead of the series until episode 23. Like Noli, Aya was written out after her actress outgrew the middle school age.
- Various actresses as Ana - Noli's friend and female lead of the series. The character first appeared in episode 24, serving as a replacement to Aya and also exited the series along with Noli after the character's actors outgrew the role. Ana was played by three rotating actresses which include Mara Babor, Marjorie Enumerable, and Agatha Tapan.
- Rolando Tinio as Lolo - the first and original guardian of the cave who later becomes a grandfather figure to the children and shown on the series until episode 11. Tinio later died on July 7, 1997.
- Various actresses as Lola - the hermit guardian and keeper of the cave that who later becomes a grandmother figure to the children. She was portrayed by the following actresses:
  - Ella Luansing Tinio - succeeded the role upon the death of Rolando Tinio, her real-life spouse.
  - Ermie Concepcion - the first replacement actress on the character upon the sudden demise of Rolando Tino and shown from episode 24 and 25.
  - Leticia Tizon - serves as the guardian and keeper of the cave; another temporary replacement of the character upon the sudden death of Tinio. She appears from episode 13 to 23.
  - Ama Quiambao - another temporary replacement of the character in a short period of time upon the death of Tinio.
  - Caridad Sanchez - played the character from episode 26 until episode 71.

=== New characters ===
- Malou de Guzman as Tita - the aunt of Ana and Noli, who first appears at episode 72.
- BJ Rodriguez as Manuel - the new male lead of the series who replaced Noli (after he was deemed outgrown of the role). He is introduced in Episode 76.
- Mark Guayco as Roland - another new male lead of the series following the exit of Noli. He is first introduced in the "Fely Tatlonghari" episode.
- Claudine Alejandro as Lisa - Manuel and Roland's friend who serves as the new female lead of the series in the "Francisca Reyes Aquino" episode. She replaced Ana and Aya, who were the original female lead characters of the series.
  - Korrine Lirio, the real-life sister of Aya actress Celine Lirio, played Lisa from episodes 76-77, before Alejandro stepped in.

== Production ==
Bayani was produced by a Creative Committee composed of an executive producer, head writer, scriptwriter, and consultants from the Department of Education, Culture and Sports (DECS, later became the Department of Education or DepEd), and history experts from the University of the Philippines Diliman. It was meant towards children 7 to 12 years of age. Producers seek to promote the value of heroism, promote the formation of the viewers' Filipino identity, as well as foster awareness regarding the implication of events, actions of people, and promotion of a certain viewpoint to history at large.

Like in Hiraya Manawari and Sine'skwela, the Creative Committee of Bayani discuss among themselves which historical hero would they feature in an episode at what heroism did they exhibit. A script for an episode will then be made and it will be vetted by a consultant from UP if the script is faithful to historical facts and records. Further changes will be made until it is approved by the whole committee. Cielo Reyes and Carina Villanoz are the executive producers of Bayani.

== Reruns ==
Reruns of the show is currently aired on ABS-CBN owned educational channel Knowledge Channel from the channel's launch in 1999.

From March 28, 2020, the show's episodes were rerun on ABS-CBN as part of the programming change the network made due to the COVID-19 pandemic in the Philippines. This rerun was abruptly cut due to the temporary closure of ABS-CBN following the cease and desist order issued by the National Telecommunications Commission on account of its franchise expiration, and then returned on the Kapamilya Channel when the channel launched on June 13, 2020.

All of its episodes can also be watched in the iWant app that is available in the Philippines.
