= Hiraya Manawari =

Philippine children's television series

- Genre: Children's television series
- Opening theme: "Hiraya Manawari" by Cris Villonco
- Ending theme: "Hiraya Manawari" by Cris Villonco
- Country of origin: Philippines
- Original language: Filipino
- No. of episodes: N/A

Production
- Producer: Gina Lopez
- Production companies: ABS-CBN Foundation; Department of Education, Culture and Sports

Original release
- Network: ABS-CBN
- Release: October 7, 1995 – 2003

Related
- Wansapanataym; Daisy Siete

Hiraya Manawari (lit. 'reach your dreams') is a Philippine television educational show by ABS-CBN. It aired from October 7, 1995 to 2003.

== Background ==
Hiraya Manawari focuses on providing values education for children through adaptations of Filipino stories and legends or original stories. The first episode of Hiraya Manawari, "Habi at Hiwaga" aired on October 7, 1995. Most episodes are family-centered and deals with courage, respect, honesty, love, humility and discipline.

== Reruns ==
On March 27, 2020, ABS-CBN announced that Hiraya Manawari will have a rerun starting from March 28, 2020, as part of ABS-CBN's temporary programming changes due to the COVID-19 pandemic.

Reruns of episodes were currently airing on the Knowledge Channel block on Kapamilya Online Live and YouTube Channel, as well as the former upon its launch in 1999.
