= Nievera (surname) =

Nievera is a surname. Notable people with the surname include:

- Bert Nievera (1936–2018), Filipino-American singer and businessman
- Martin Nievera (born 1962), Filipino-American singer and TV host
- Robin Nievera (born 1986), Filipino singer-songwriter and son of Martin Nievera and Pops Fernandez
