= We Love OPM =

- Hosted by: Anne Curtis with Eric Nicolas
- Judges: Pinoy Icon; 50 Audience
- Winner: Tres Kantos
- Runners-up: Oh My Girls & O Diva

Release
- Original network: ABS-CBN
- Original release: May 14 – July 17, 2016

We Love OPM: The Celebrity Sing-Offs (stylized as We ♥ OPM: The Celebrity Sing-Offs) is a Philippine television reality competition show broadcast by ABS-CBN. Hosted by Anne Curtis and Eric Nicolas and mentored by Jay-R, Yeng Constantino, Nyoy Volante, KZ Tandingan, Erik Santos and Richard Poon. It aired on the network's Yes Weekend! line up from May 14 to July 17, 2016, replacing I Love OPM and was replaced by Pinoy Big Brother: Lucky 7.

After 10 weeks of completion, Erik Santos' team Tres Kantos was named Grand CelebriTeam after garnering 80.45% of the combined OPM Icon and public's votes (online and text). Tres Kantos won ₱2,000,000 (about £32,375, €38,750, US$42,750), half of which they donated to their chosen beneficiary, Casa San Miguel Foundation.

== Celebrity Mentors ==
- Erik Santos - King of Teleserye, Prince of Pop & Movie Themesong
- Jay-R - King of R&B
- KZ Tandingan - Soul Supreme
- Nyoy Volante - King of Acoustic Pop
- Richard Poon - Philippines' Crooner
- Yeng Constantino - Pop Rock Superstar

== Guest Mentor(s) ==
- Kyla - Queen of R&B (Substitute for Jay R) (Week 2, 4, 8 & 9)

== CelebriTeams ==
Tres Kantos by Erik Santos

- Dominador Aviola aka Daddy D
- Bugoy Drilon
- Jovit Baldivino

O Diva by KZ Tandingan

- Liezel Garcia
- Emmanuelle Vera
- Klarisse De Guzman

Hot Spots by Jay-R

- Markki Stroem
- Ryan Sy
- Alex Diaz

Power Chords by Nyoy Volante

- Kaye Cal
- Marlo Mortel
- Marion Aunor

Voice Next Door by Richard Poon

- Kyle Echarri
- Bailey May
- Juan Karlos Labajo

Oh My Girls by Yeng Constantino

- Ylona Garcia
- Krissha Viaje
- Alexa Ilacad

== Episodes ==
=== Week 1 (May 14 and 15, 2016) ===
OPM Icon: Martin Nievera

Order	CelebriTeam	Mentor	Song and Artist/s	Score		
Order	CelebriTeam	Mentor	Song and Artist/s	Martin	Kababayans	Total
1	O Diva	KZ Tandingan	"Ikaw Ang Pangarap" popularized by Martin Nievera	49	41	90
2	Power Chords	Nyoy Volante	"Kahit Isang Saglit" popularized by Martin Nievera	45	39	84
3	Voice Next Door	Richard Poon	"Sa Kanya" popularized by Martin Nievera	45	43	88
4	Hot Spots	Jay-R	"Babalik Kang Muli" popularized by Martin Nievera	47	33	80
5	Oh My Girls	Yeng Constantino	"Habang May Buhay" popularized by Martin Nievera	47	49	96
6	Tres Kantos	Erik Santos	"Ikaw Ang Lahat Sa Akin" by Martin Nievera	48	49	97

=== Week 2 (May 21 and 22, 2016) ===
OPM Icon: Sharon Cuneta

Order	CelebriTeam	Mentor	Song and Artist/s	Score		
Order	CelebriTeam	Mentor	Song and Artist/s	Sharon	Kababayans	Total
1	Voice Next Door	Richard Poon	"Pangarap Na Bituin" by Sharon Cuneta	40	45	85
2	Tres Kantos	Erik Santos	"Ikaw" popularized by Sharon Cuneta	45	46	91
3	Power Chords	Nyoy Volante	"Sana'y Wala Ng Wakas" by Sharon Cuneta	43	45	88
4	Oh My Girls	Yeng Constantino	"Kahit Konting Pagtingin" by Sharon Cuneta	43	46	89
5	Hot Spots	Kyla*	"Tubig At Langis" by Sharon Cuneta	47	41	88
6	O Diva	KZ Tandingan	"Mr. DJ" by Sharon Cuneta	n/a	n/a	94

- *Guest Mentor

=== Week 3 (May 28 and 29, 2016) ===
OPM Icon: Sonny Parsons with the rest of the Hagibis

Order	CelebriTeam	Mentor	Song and Artist/s	Score		
Order	CelebriTeam	Mentor	Song and Artist/s	Hagibis	Kababayans	Total
1	Tres Kantos	Erik Santos	"Nanggigigil" by Hagibis	45	45	90
2	Oh My Girls	Yeng Constantino	"Ilagay Mo Kid" by Hagibis	48	43	91
3	O Diva	KZ Tandingan	"Katawan" by Hagibis	48	42	90
4	Hot Spots	Jay-R	"Babae" by Hagibis	50	43	93
5	Power Chords	Nyoy Volante	"Legs" by Hagibis	48	41	89
6	Voice Next Door	Richard Poon	"Lalake" by Hagibis	48	34	82

=== Week 4 (June 4 and 5, 2016) ===
OPM Icon: Gary Valenciano

Order	CelebriTeam	Mentor	Song and Artist/s	Score		
Order	CelebriTeam	Mentor	Song and Artist/s	Gary	Kababayans	Total
1	Hot Spots	Kyla*	"Di Bale Na Lang" by Gary Valenciano	47	46	93
2	O Diva	KZ Tandingan	"Gaya ng Dati" by Gary Valenciano	50	47	97
3	Tres Kantos	Erik Santos	"Hataw Na" by Gary Valenciano	48	48	96
4	Voice Next Door	Richard Poon	"Paano" by Gary Valenciano	48	46	94
5	Oh My Girls	Yeng Constantino	"Eto na Naman" by Gary Valenciano	46	44	90
6	Power Chords	Nyoy Volante	"Sana Maulit Muli" by Gary Valenciano	45	50	95

- *Guest Mentor

=== Week 5 (June 12, 2016) ===
Due to Saturday's episode being pre-empted to give way to the free TV premiere of Heneral Luna, the show only aired on Sunday and is composed of entirely duet performances.

- OPM Icon: Rey Valera

Order	CelebriTeams	AKA	Mentors	Song and Artist/s	Score		
Order	CelebriTeams	AKA	Mentors	Song and Artist/s	Rey	Kababayans	Total
1	Tres Kantos; Hot Spots	La Hot Kantos	Erik Santos; Jay-R	"Malayo Pa Ang Umaga" by Rey Valera	45	50	95
2	O Diva; Power Chords	O Chords	KZ Tandingan; Nyoy Volante	"Kung Kailangan Mo Ako" by Rey Valera	48	48	96
3	Oh My Girls; Voice Next Door	Poonstantino	Yeng Constantino; Richard Poon	"Kung Tayo'y Magkakalayo" by Rey Valera	43	45	88

=== Week 6 (June 18 and 19, 2016) ===
- OPM Icon: Rico J. Puno

Order	CelebriTeam	Mentor	Song and Artist/s	Score		
Order	CelebriTeam	Mentor	Song and Artist/s	Rico J.	Kababayans	Total
1	Voice Next Door	Richard Poon	"Macho Gwapito" by Rico J. Puno	40	47	87
2	Hot Spots	Jay-R	"Sorry Na, Pwede Ba" by Rico J. Puno	49	43	92
3	O Diva	KZ Tandingan	"Diyos Ang Pag-ibig" by Rico J. Puno	49	45	94
4	Tres Kantos	Erik Santos	"May Bukas Pa" by Rico J. Puno	50	48	98
5	Power Chords	Nyoy Volante	"Magkasuyo Buong Gabi" by Rico J. Puno	48	40	88
6	Oh My Girls	Yeng Constantino	"Kapalaran" by Rico J. Puno	49	41	90

=== Week 7 (June 25 and 26, 2016) ===
- OPM Icon: Aegis

Order	CelebriTeam	Mentor	Song and Artist/s	Score		
Order	CelebriTeam	Mentor	Song and Artist/s	Aegis	Kababayans	Total
1	Power Chords	Nyoy Volante	"Halik" by Aegis	42	40	82
2	Tres Kantos	Erik Santos	"Luha" by Aegis	46	45	91
3	Oh My Girls	Yeng Constantino	"Mahal Na Mahal Kita" by Aegis	46	45	91
4	Voice Next Door	Richard Poon	"Sayang Na Sayang" by Aegis	49	43	92
5	O Diva	KZ Tandingan	"Basang-basa Sa Ulan" by Aegis	49	45	94
6	Hot Spots	Jay-R	"Sinta" by Aegis	48	47	95

=== Week 8 (July 2 and 3, 2016) ===
- OPM Icon: Vice Ganda

Order	CelebriTeam	Mentor	Song and Artist/s	Score		
Order	CelebriTeam	Mentor	Song and Artist/s	Vice	Kababayans	Total
1	O Diva	KZ Tandingan	"Karakaraka" by Vice Ganda	45	43	88
2	Oh My Girls	Yeng Constantino	"Manhid Ka" by Vice Ganda	42	40	82
3	Hot Spots	Kyla*	"Boom Panes" by Vice Ganda	44	39	83
4	Power Chords	Nyoy Volante	"Good Vibes" by Vice Ganda	42	40	82
5	Voice Next Door	Richard Poon	"Wag Kang Pabebe" by Vice Ganda	41	41	82
6	Tres Kantos	Erik Santos	"Whoops Kiri" by Vice Ganda	47	44	91

- *Guest Mentor

=== Week 9 (July 9 and 10, 2016) ===
- OPM Icons: Jim Paredes and Boboy Garovillo of Apo Hiking Society

Order	CelebriTeam	Mentor	Song and Artist/s	Score
Order	CelebriTeam	Mentor	Song and Artist/s	Total
1	Power Chords	Nyoy Volante	"Yakap Sa Dilim" by Apo Hiking Society	87
2	Voice Next Door	Richard Poon	"Blue Jeans" by Apo Hiking Society	86
3	Tres Kantos	Erik Santos	"Saan Na Nga Ba'ng Barkada" by Apo Hiking Society	82
4	O Diva	KZ Tandingan	"Batang-Bata Ka Pa" by Apo Hiking Society	90
5	Hot Spots	Kyla*	"Panalangin" by Apo Hiking Society	83
6	Oh My Girls	Yeng Constantino	"Mahirap Magmahal ng Syota ng Iba" by Apo Hiking Society	91

- *Guest Mentor

=== Semi Finals (July 16, 2016) ===
The Semi-Finals were held live from the Newport Performing Arts Theater in Resorts World Manila. Juan Karlos Labajo, one of the members of Voice Next Door was not present due to being a housemate in Pinoy Big Brother: Lucky 7.

- Opening song: Tagumpay Nating Lahat by Lea Salonga

Performers: Celebriteams

- Other performance: Ang Himig Natin by Juan de la Cruz Band

Performers: Celebriteam Mentors

- OPM Icons: The Jukebox Queens (Claire de la Fuente, Eva Eugenio and Imelda Papin)

Order	CelebriTeam	Mentor	Song and Artist/s	Score		
Order	CelebriTeam	Mentor	Song and Artist/s	Jukebox Queens	Kababayans	Total
1	Oh My Girls	Yeng Constantino	"Isang Linggong Pag-Ibig" by Imelda Papin	45	44	89
2	Power Chords	Nyoy Volante	"Pag-Ibig Na Walang Dangal" by Eva Eugenio	42	33	75
3	Voice Next Door	Richard Poon	"Bakit" by Imelda Papin	48	41	89
4	Hot Spots	Jay-R	"Sayang" by Claire dela Fuente	42	27	69
5	Tres Kantos	Erik Santos	"Tukso" by Eva Eugenio	47	50	97

- CelebriTeam won via public votes

=== Grand Celebrity Sing Offs (July 17, 2016) ===
The Grand Celebrity Sing-Offs were held live from the Newport Performing Arts Theater in Resorts World Manila. However, one of the mentors, Richard Poon was not present due to prior commitments.

Opening song: Kay Ganda ng Ating Musika by Hajji Alejandro

Guest performer/s: Mitoy Yonting, Kean Cipriano, Mike Hanopol

Serenade song: Araw Gabi by Regine Velasquez

Guest performer/s: Sam Concepcion, Iñigo Pascual & I Love OPM's Grand Touristar Yohan Hwang

- OPM Icon: Ryan Cayabyab

Order	CelebriTeam	Mentor	Song and Artist/s	Score
Order	CelebriTeam	Mentor	Song and Artist/s	Total
1	Tres Kantos	Erik Santos	"Nais Ko" by Basil Valdez	80.45%
2	Oh My Girls	Yeng Constantino	"Kailan" by Smokey Mountain	58.27%
3	O Diva	KZ Tandingan	"Limang Dipang Tao" by Celeste Legaspi	57.78%

== Summary of Results ==
The table below shows the corresponding total hearts (♥) earned per week:

Contestant	Mentor	Week 1	Week 2	Week 3	Week 4	Week 5	Week 6	Week 7	Week 8	Week 9	Semi-Finals	Finals	Total
Tres Kantos: Daddy D, Bugoy & Jovit	Erik Santos	1st 97	2nd 91	3rd/4th 90	2nd 96	3rd/4th 95	1st 98	4th/5th 91	1st 91	6th 82	1st 97	80.45% Winner	831
Oh My Girls: Ylona, Krissha & Alexa	Yeng Constantino	2nd 96	3rd 89	2nd 91	5th/6th 90	5th/6th 88	4th 90	4th/5th 91	4th/5th/6th 82	1st 91	2nd/3rd 89	58.27% Runner-up	808
O Diva: Liezel, Emmanuelle & Klarisse	KZ Tandingan	3rd 90	1st 94	3rd/4th 90	1st 97	1st/2nd 96	2nd 94	2nd 94	2nd 88	2nd 90	Exempt; Finalist	57.78% Third place	833
Hot Spots: Markki, Ryan & Alex	Jay-R	6th 80	4th/5th 88	1st 93	5th 93	3rd/4th 95	3rd 92	1st 95	3rd 83	5th 83	5th 69	Eliminated	802
Power Chords Kaye, Marlo & Marion	Nyoy Volante	5th 84	4th/5th 88	4th 89	3rd 95	1st/2nd 96	5th 88	6th 82	4th/5th/6th 82	3rd 87	4th 75	Eliminated	791
Voice Next Door: Kyle, Bailey & JK	Richard Poon	4th 88	6th 85	6th 82	4th 94	5th/6th 88	6th 87	3rd 92	4th/5th/6th 82	4th 86	2nd/3rd 89	Eliminated	784

=== Legend ===
- CelebriTeam won that particular week
- CelebriTeam placed last that particular week
