= I Love OPM =

- Presented by: Anne Curtis; Eric Nicolas
- Judges: Martin Nievera; Lani Misalucha; Toni Gonzaga
- Winner: Yohan Hwang
- Runners-up: J Morning from Seoul, South Korea
- No. of episodes: 20

Release
- Original network: ABS-CBN
- Original release: February 13 – April 23, 2016

I Love OPM (stylized as I ♥ OPM: Original Pinoy Music) is a Philippine television reality competition show broadcast by ABS-CBN. Hosted by Anne Curtis and Eric Nicolas, it aired on the network's Yes Weekend! line up from February 13 to April 23, 2016, replacing Dance Kids and was replaced by We Love OPM.

== Format and conception ==
100% foreigners will compete against each other in singing competition using Filipino songs and most notably the Original Pilipino Music genre. Originally conceived in 2014, the show initially had apl.de.ap as the host but had to decline after scheduling conflicts. Upon being requested as judges, Martin Nievera and Lani Misalucha agreed to participate. Singer-actress Donna Cruz was originally the third judge but the delay in production forced her to withdraw due to personal commitments. Cruz vouched for singer and friend Regine Velasquez to take her place, but since Velasquez renewed her contract with rival station GMA Network, Velasquez was unable to commit despite expressing interest to reunite with peers Nievera and Misalucha. Toni Gonzaga was tapped to be the third judge.

The contestants dubbed as "Touristars" must initially go through 2 rounds which each advancement to another round being termed as "passing a Gate". The audition phase shall determine the 24 contestants to "pass through Gate 1" or qualify to the next round. On the second round to pass Gate 2, the 24 contestants that qualified the audition phase will be group into 4 to compete against each other. Only two contestants per group can advance to the next round. The top two contestants will automatically get a chair, while the third and fourth contestants needs to Bump Off the former by surpassing the current high scores. On the third round, the contestants are grouped in to three to compete for Kababayan's Choice and Judge's Choice. After each performance, the live audience will give a Love Heart or Broken Heart to vote. The contestant with the highest Love Heart will be the Kababayan's Choice. The judges will then choose between the two remaining contestant to be the Judge's Choice.

Each gates corresponds to audition (Gate 1: The Audition), elimination round (Gate 2: The Bump Off), quarter finals (Gate 3: The Kababayan Bump Off), semi-finals (Gate 4: The Take Off), and finals (Gate 5: The Grand Destination).

== Episodes ==
I ♥ OPM: Original Pinoy Music premiered on ABS-CBN and worldwide on The Filipino Channel on February 13, 2016 and ended on April 23, 2016, taking over the original timeslot of Pilipinas Got Talent season 5, after Dance Kids ended, which caused the former to take the latter's old timeslot.

=== Gate 1: The Audition ===
Each touristars must get at least 2 Approved from Himigration Officers (Himigration is a portmanteau of the Filipino word himig which means "melody" and the word immigration) to proceed to the next round. When they get 2 Denied, they are eliminated from the competition.

==== Episode 1 (February 13, 2016) ====
Episode hashtag: #ILoveOPM

Episode rating: 24.8%

Order	Touristar	Age	Flag	Country of Origin	Song and Artist/s	Himigration Officer		
Order	Touristar	Age	Flag	Country of Origin	Song and Artist/s	Toni	Martin	Lani
1	Jeena Dimaandal	19	(United States)	United States, (California)	Bituing Walang Ningning by Sharon Cuneta	Approved	Approved	Approved
2	Ryan Gallagher	27	(United States)	United States, (Michigan)	Kahit Isang Saglit by Martin Nievera	Approved	Approved	Denied
3	Soo Jin Lee	22	(South Korea)	Korea	Chinito by Yeng Constantino	Denied	Denied	Approved
4	Harris Dio Smith	30	(Pakistan)	Pakistan	Beep Beep by Juan dela Cruz Band	Approved	Approved	Approved

==== Episode 2 (February 14, 2016) ====
Episode hashtag: #MahalKitaOPM

Episode rating: 20.0%

Order	Touristar	Age	Flag	Country of Origin	Song and Artist/s	Himigration Officer		
Order	Touristar	Age	Flag	Country of Origin	Song and Artist/s	Toni	Martin	Lani
1	Addy Raj Gaur	21	(India)	India	Hinahanap-Hanap Kita by Rivermaya (popularized by Daniel Padilla)	Approved	Approved	Approved
2	Raza Saeed	27	(Pakistan)	Pakistan	Ngiti by Ronnie Liang	Denied	Denied	Approved
3	Anna Rabtsun	26	(Russia)	Russia	Sirena by Gloc-9 feat. Ebe Dancel	Denied	Approved	Approved
4	J Morning		(South Korea)	Korea	Ikaw by Yeng Constantino	Approved	Approved	Approved

==== Episode 3 (February 20, 2016) ====
Episode hashtag: #ILoveOPMSabado

Episode rating: 23.8%

Order	Touristar	Age	Flag	Country of Origin	Song and Artist/s	Himigration Officer		
Order	Touristar	Age	Flag	Country of Origin	Song and Artist/s	Toni	Martin	Lani
1	Sumner Mahaffey	22	(United States)	United States, (Missouri)	Pag-Ibig by Yeng Constantino	Approved	Approved	Approved
2	Victor Cervantes	38	(United States)	United States, (California)	Kailangan Kita by Gary Valenciano	Denied	Denied	Approved
3	Jerome McCuin	29	(United States)	United States, (California)	Kawawang Cowboy by Fred Panopio	Approved	Approved	Approved
4	Fathin Amira	24	(Singapore)	Singapore	Bukas Na Lang Kita Mamahalin by Lani Misalucha	Approved	Approved	Approved

==== Episode 4 (February 21, 2016) ====
Episode hashtag: #SundayOPMvibes

Episode ratings: 17.1%

Order	Touristar	Age	Flag	Country of Origin	Song and Artist/s	Himigration Officer		
Order	Touristar	Age	Flag	Country of Origin	Song and Artist/s	Toni	Martin	Lani
1	Daniel Herrington	27	(United States)	United States (Mississippi)	Mahal Kita Pero by Janella Salvador	Approved	Approved	Approved
2	Mitch Smith Sr.	52	(United States)	United States (California)	Nandito Ako by Ogie Alcasid	Denied	Denied	Approved
3	Naisa Lasalosi	21	(Australia)	Australia (Sydney)	Halik by Aegis	Approved	Approved	Approved
4	DBD; Dae Lee; Bobby Skyz; Dwaine Wooley	26; 24; 25	(South Korea) (Nigeria) (Australia)	Korea (Seoul); Nigeria; Australia	Magda by Gloc-9 feat. Rico Blanco	Approved	Approved	Approved

==== Episode 5 (February 27, 2016) ====
Episode hashtag: #SaturdayOPMLove

Episode rating: 18.3%

Order	Touristar	Age	Flag	Country of Origin	Song and Artist/s	Himigration Officer		
Order	Touristar	Age	Flag	Country of Origin	Song and Artist/s	Toni	Martin	Lani
1	Yohan Hwang	20	(South Korea)	Korea (Seoul)	Ako'y Sa'Yo at Ika'y Akin by First Circle, (popularized by Daniel Padilla)	Approved	Approved	Approved
2	Moses Akoh	26	(Nigeria)	Nigeria	Kahit Kailan by South Border	Approved	Approved	Approved
3	Flora Lee	27	(South Korea)	Korea (Seoul)	Hulog Ng Langit by Donna Cruz	Denied	Approved	Denied
4	Marina Lin	19	(Thailand)	Thailand (Bangkok)	Hawak Kamay by Yeng Constantino	Approved	Approved	Approved
5	Matthew May	36	(United Kingdom)	United Kingdom (England)	May Bukas Pa by Rico J. Puno	Approved	Approved	Approved

==== Episode 6 (February 28, 2016) ====
Episode hashtag: #OPMSundayWins

Episode rating: 14.7%

Order	Touristar	Age	Flag	Country of Origin	Song and Artist/s	Himigration Officer		
Order	Touristar	Age	Flag	Country of Origin	Song and Artist/s	Toni	Martin	Lani
1	Mango Singhi	29	(India)	India	Mang Jose by Parokya ni Edgar	Denied	Denied	Approved
2	Jonathan Wagner	28	(France)	France (Paris)	Ikaw by Sharon Cuneta	Approved	Approved	Approved
3	Natalia Moon	24	(Australia)	Australia	Pusong Bato by Alon, (popularized by Jovit Baldivino)	Denied	Denied	Denied
4	Nelson Leausa	25	(Samoa)	Samoa	Bakit Pa Ba by Jay-R	Approved	Approved	Approved

==== Episode 7 (March 5, 2016) ====
Episode hashtag: #ILoveOPMTop24

Episode rating: 18.3%

Order	Touristar	Age	Flag	Country of Origin	Song and Artist/s	Himigration Officer		
Order	Touristar	Age	Flag	Country of Origin	Song and Artist/s	Toni	Martin	Lani
1	UchuSentai:Noiz		(Japan)	Japan	Pinoy Ako by Orange and Lemons	Denied	Approved	Approved
2	Montri Bootnak	26	(Thailand)	Thailand	Hanggang by Wency Cornejo	Approved	Approved	Approved
3	Jeff James	27	(United States)	United States (Hawaii)	Buko by Jireh Lim	Approved	Approved	Approved
4	In Seon Jung	27	(South Korea)	Korea	Pagdating Ng Panahon by Aiza Seguerra	Denied	Approved	Approved
5	Reece Rostedt	23	(Australia)	Australia	Narda by Kamikazee	Approved	Approved	Approved
6	Graceson Craig		(United Kingdom)	United Kingdom	Tadhana by Up Dharma Down	Denied	Denied	Denied
7	James Sze		(Singapore)	Singapore	Mahal Kita Walang Iba by Ogie Alcasid	Approved	Denied	Denied
8	Briana Takada		(Palau)	Palau	Mahal Ko O Mahal Ako by KZ Tandingan	Denied	Approved	Denied
9	Brigham Tauteoli		(Tonga)	Tonga	Ikaw Lang Aking Mahal by Brownman Revival	Denied	Denied	Approved
10	Rizuan Rashid		(Singapore)	Singapore	Muli by Rodel Naval	Denied	Approved	Denied
11	Talal Kuwailed Al Anazi		(Saudi Arabia)	Saudi Arabia	Pangako by Kindred Garden	Approved	Denied	Denied
12	Farid Ghosn		(United Arab Emirates)	United Arab Emirates (Dubai)	Musika Ang Buhay by Asin	Denied	Denied	Approved
13	Sonata Stevenson	25	(United States)	United States (Philadelphia)	Ikaw Lamang by Janno Gibbs and Jaya	Approved	Approved	Denied

=== Gate 2: The Bump-Off ===
This gate is equivalent to elimination round.

The 24 Touristars will be grouped into 4 that will be competing against each other. Only two Touristars per group can pass Gate 2. The first two Touristars will automatically get a chair, while the third and fourth Touristars needs to Bump Off the former by surpassing the current high scores.

==== Episode 8 (March 6, 2016) ====
Episode hashtag: #ILOPMGate2

Destination: Davao

Activities: (1) white water rafting; (2) zip line; (3) crocodile feeding; and (4) snake massage

Episode rating: 15.7%

Order	Touristar	Age	Flag	Country of Origin	Song and Artist/s	Himigration Officer			Average
Order	Touristar	Age	Flag	Country of Origin	Song and Artist/s	Toni	Martin	Lani	Average
1	Sumner Mahaffey	22	(United States)	United States (Missouri)	Simpleng Tulad Mo by Daniel Padilla	89	90	96	91.7
2	Reece Rostedt	23	(Australia)	Australia	Kay Cristo Lang (In Christ Alone) by Owl City, translated by Reece Rostedt	88	85	87	86.7
3	Fathin Amira	24	(Singapore)	Singapore	Paano by Lani Misalucha	96	96	97	96.3
4	Naisa Lasalosi	21	(Australia)	Australia (Sydney)	Ikot-Ikot by Sarah Geronimo	94	91	96	93.7

==== Episode 9 (March 12, 2016) ====
Episode hashtag: #ILOPMbohol

Destination: Bohol

Special Tour Guide/s: Joj Ampangan and Jai Ampangan

Activities: (1) meet-and-greet with a guitar maker; (2) Tarsier Conservation visit; (3) eat on floating restaurant; and (4) Loboc Church visit

Episode rating: 16.5%

Order	Touristar	Age	Flag	Country of Origin	Song and Artist/s	Himigration Officer			Average
Order	Touristar	Age	Flag	Country of Origin	Song and Artist/s	Toni	Martin	Lani	Average
1	Jeff James	27	(United States)	United States (Hawaii)	Kung Ako Na Lang Sana by Bituin Escalante	89	89	89	89.0
2	Anna Rabtsun	26	(Russia)	Russia	Bakit Pa by Jessa Zaragoza	90	88	84	87.3
3	Yohan Hwang	20	(South Korea)	Korea (Seoul)	Nasa 'Yo Na Ang Lahat by Daniel Padilla	94	94	89	92.3
4	Moses Akoh	26	(Nigeria)	Nigeria	Himala by Rivermaya	95	93	94	94.0

==== Episode 10 (March 13, 2016) ====
Episode hashtag: #ILOPMmanila

Destination: Manila

Special Touristar Guide/s: Tart Carlos and Viveika Ravanes

Activities: (1) ride ferry boat; (2) eating Soup Number Five and Filipino street foods; and (3) visiting Rizal Park /Luneta Park, Chinatown, Quiapo Church and the Intramuros

Episode rating: 16.2%

Order	Touristar	Age	Flag	Country of Origin	Song and Artist/s	Himigration Officer			Average
Order	Touristar	Age	Flag	Country of Origin	Song and Artist/s	Toni	Martin	Lani	Average
1	UchuSentai:Noiz		(Japan)	Japan	Liwanag Sa Dilim by Rivermaya	89	89	89	89.0
2	Marina Lin	19	(Thailand)	Thailand (Bangkok)	Oo by Up Dharma Down	89	88	88	88.3
3	Sonata Stevenson	25	(United States)	United States (Philadelphia)	Salamat Musika by Nanette Inventor	90	86	86	87.7
4	Ryan Gallagher	27	(United States)	United States (Michigan)	Sana Maulit Muli by Gary Valenciano	94	95	90	93.0

==== Episode 11 (March 19, 2016) ====
Episode hashtag: #OpmCEBUtiful

Destination: Cebu

Special Touristar Guide/s: Crazy Duo

Activities: (1) whaleshark watching; (2) singing with local bangkero; and (3) habal-habal riding

Episode rating: 14.7%

Order	Touristar	Age	Flag	Country of Origin	Song and Artist/s	Himigration Officer			Average
Order	Touristar	Age	Flag	Country of Origin	Song and Artist/s	Toni	Martin	Lani	Average
1	DBD; Dae Lee; Bobby Skyz; Dwaine Wooley	26; 24; 25	(South Korea) (Nigeria) (Australia)	Korea (Seoul); Nigeria; Australia	Tuloy Pa Rin by Neocolors	94	96	90	93.3
2	Jonathan Wagner	28	(France)	France, (Paris)	Maalaala Mo Kaya by Carol Banawa	91	89	88	89.3
3	Jeena Dimaandal	19	(United States)	United States, (California)	Iisa Pa Lamang by Joey Albert	92	90	91	91.0
4	Jerome McCuin	29	(United States)	United States, (California)	Mr. Suave by Parokya ni Edgar	88	88	89	88.3

==== Episode 12 (March 20, 2016) ====
Episode hashtag: #OPMBeCoolBicol

Destination: Bicol

Special Touristar Guide/s: Venus Raj

Activities: (1) preparing raft; (2) preparing and eating pinangat; (3) riding ATV; and (4) visiting Cagsawa Ruins

Episode rating: 15.7%

Order	Touristar	Age	Flag	Country of Origin	Song and Artist/s	Himigration Officer			Average
Order	Touristar	Age	Flag	Country of Origin	Song and Artist/s	Toni	Martin	Lani	Average
1	Daniel Herrington	27	(United States)	United States (Mississippi)	No Erase by James Reid and Nadine Lustre	95	90	96	93.7
2	In Seon Jung	27	(South Korea)	Korea	Pangako by Regine Velasquez	85	85	89	86.3
3	Nelson Leausa	25	(Samoa)	Samoa	Ikaw Ang Lahat Sa Akin by Martin Nievera	90	86	91	89.0
4	Harris Dio Smith	30	(Pakistan)	Pakistan	Hallelujah by Bamboo	96	98	96	96.7

==== Episode 13 (March 27, 2016) ====
Episode hashtag: #OPMHappyEaster

Destination: Pampanga

Special Touristar Guide/s: Ryan Bang

Activities: (1) eating in a turo-turo; and (2) visiting the Aeta tribe

Episode rating: 15.5%

Order	Touristar	Age	Flag	Country of Origin	Song and Artist/s	Himigration Officer			Average
Order	Touristar	Age	Flag	Country of Origin	Song and Artist/s	Toni	Martin	Lani	Average
1	Matthew May	36	(United Kingdom)	United Kingdom, (England)	Habang May Buhay by After Image	90	89	90	89.7
2	Addy Raj	21	(India)	India	Huwag Ka Nang Humirit by James Reid	87	85	87	86.3
3	J Morning		(South Korea)	Korea	Kapag Tumibok Ang Puso by Donna Cruz	94	95	96	95.0
4	Montri Bootnak	26	(Thailand)	Thailand (Bangkok)	Ikaw Na Nga by Willie Revillame	88	90	90	89.3

=== Gate 3: The Kababayan Bump-off ===
This gate is equivalent to quarter-final round.

The Touristars is divided into group of three. Each Himigration Officer will have a karaoke session with the three Touristars. Only two of these three will proceed to next round. The first Touristar will be chosen by 100 Kababayan (studio audience) which will give Love Heart or Broken Heart, the Kababayan's Choice. The second Touristar will be chosen by the Himigration Officers, the Judge's Choice.

==== Episode 14 (April 2, 2016) ====
Episode hashtag: #OPMletsVOTEin

Opening song: Noypi by Bamboo

Episode rating: 14.3%

Order	Touristar	Age	Flag	Country of Origin	Song and Artist/s	Karaoke Session	Kababayan's Choice	Judge's Choice		
Order	Touristar	Age	Flag	Country of Origin	Song and Artist/s	Karaoke Session	Kababayan's Choice	Toni	Martin	Lani
1	Ryan Gallagher	27	(United States)	United States, (Michigan)	Hanggang Sa Dulo Ng Walang Hanggan by Basil Valdez	Toni	95		✔	✔
2	Daniel Herrington	27	(United States)	United States, (Mississippi)	Mahal Na Mahal by Archie D, (popularized by Sam Concepcion)	Lani	93	✔		
3	Yohan Hwang	20	(South Korea)	Korea (Seoul)	Gusto Kita by Gino Padilla	Lani	98			

==== Episode 15 (April 3, 2016) ====
Episode hashtag: #OPMiheartyou

Opening song: Ang Huling El Bimbo by Eraserheads

Episode rating: 14.8%

Order	Touristar	Age	Flag	Country of Origin	Song and Artist/s	Karaoke Session	Kababayan's Choice	Judge's Choice		
Order	Touristar	Age	Flag	Country of Origin	Song and Artist/s	Karaoke Session	Kababayan's Choice	Toni	Martin	Lani
1	UchuSentai:Noiz		(Japan)	Japan	Narda by Kamikazee	Martin	60			
2	J Morning		(South Korea)	Korea	Anak by Freddie Aguilar	Lani	95			
3	DBD; Dae Lee; Bobby Skyz; Dwaine Wooley	26; 24; 25	(South Korea) (Nigeria) (Australia)	Korea (Seoul); Nigeria; Australia	Kilometro by Sarah Geronimo	Toni	58	✔	✔	✔

==== Episode 16 (April 9, 2016) ====
Episode hashtag: #OPMPowerSabado

Opening song: Bonggahan by Sampaguita

Episode rating: 12.9%

Order	Touristar	Age	Flag	Country of Origin	Song and Artist/s	Karaoke Session	Kababayan's Choice	Judge's Choice		
Order	Touristar	Age	Flag	Country of Origin	Song and Artist/s	Karaoke Session	Kababayan's Choice	Toni	Martin	Lani
1	Harris Dio Smith	30	(Pakistan)	Pakistan	Nosi Ba Lasi by Sampaguita	Toni	95			
2	Moses Akoh	26	(Nigeria)	Nigeria	Ikaw Ang Pangarap by Martin Nievera	Martin	80		✔	✔
3	Matthew May	36	(United Kingdom)	United Kingdom, (England)	Diyos Ay Pag-Ibig a Christian song	Martin	82	✔		

==== Episode 17 (April 10, 2016) ====
Episode hashtag: #OPMTop8

Opening song: Awitin Mo, Isasayaw Ko by VST & Company

Episode rating: 15.7%

Order	Touristar	Age	Flag	Country of Origin	Song and Artist/s	Karaoke Session	Kababayan's Choice	Judge's Choice		
Order	Touristar	Age	Flag	Country of Origin	Song and Artist/s	Karaoke Session	Kababayan's Choice	Toni	Martin	Lani
1	Naisa Lasalosi	21	(Australia)	Australia, (Sydney)	Isang Lahi by Regine Velasquez	Toni	89			
2	Fathin Amira	24	(Singapore)	Singapore	Wala Na Bang Pag-Ibig by Jaya	Martin	94			
3	Jeena Dimaandal	19	(United States)	United States, (California)	Tunay Na Mahal by Lani Misalucha	Lani				

=== Gate 4: The Take Off ===
This gate is equivalent to semi-final round.

Like the previous gate, there will be a Kababayan's Choice and Judge's Choice. There will be two Kababayan's Choice which are the ones who will receive the most number of Love Hearts from the 100 Kababayan (studio audience), including Filipino music celebrities, music composers, and music personalities like Jason Dy, Morissette Amon, Michael Pangilinan, Hazel Faith Dela Cruz, Nyoy Volante, Davey Langit and DJ Chacha. There will also be two Judge's Choice which are the ones who will get the unanimous votes from the judges. Instead of karaoke sessions with the Himigration Officers, the Touristars had a mentoring session with two guest celebrities; Erik Santos and Yeng Constantino.

==== Episode 18 (April 16, 2016) ====
Episode hashtag: #OPMTheTakeOff

Opening song: 'Eto Na Naman by Gary Valenciano

Celebrity Mentors: Erik Santos, and Yeng Constantino

Episode rating: 12.4%

NOTE: This is the first part of this two-part episode. The results were announced on the second part.

Order	Touristar	Age	Flag	Country of Origin	Song and Artist/s	Kababayan's Choice	Judge's Choice		
Order	Touristar	Age	Flag	Country of Origin	Song and Artist/s	Kababayan's Choice	Toni	Martin	Lani
1	Fathin Amira	24	(Singapore)	Singapore	Lumayo Ka Man Sa Akin by Rodel Naval	90			
2	Moses Akoh	26	(Nigeria)	Nigeria	Mahal Kita ('Di Mo Pansin) by Kyla	95			
3	DBD; Dae Lee; Bobby Skyz; Dwaine Wooley	26; 24; 25	(South Korea) (Nigeria) (Australia)	Korea (Seoul); Nigeria; Australia	Dahil Mahal Na Mahal Kita by Roselle Nava	80			
4	Naisa Lasalosi	21	(Australia)	Australia, (Sydney)	Patuloy Ang Pangarap by Angeline Quinto	89			
5	Harris Dio Smith	30	(Pakistan)	Pakistan	Laki Sa Layaw by Mike Hanopol	97			

==== Episode 19 (April 17, 2016) ====
Episode hashtag: #OPMTop4

Celebrity Mentors: Erik Santos and Yeng Constantino

Episode rating: 18.7%

NOTE: This is a continuation on the first part of the two-part episode.

Order	Touristar	Age	Flag	Country of Origin	Song and Artist/s	Kababayan's Choice	Judge's Choice		
Order	Touristar	Age	Flag	Country of Origin	Song and Artist/s	Kababayan's Choice	Toni	Martin	Lani
1	J Morning		(South Korea)	Korea	Boom Panes by Vice Ganda	95	❤	❤	❤
2	Ryan Gallagher	27	(United States)	United States (Michigan)	Minsan Lang Kitang Iibigin by Ariel Rivera	94	❤	❤	❤
3	Yohan Hwang	20	(South Korea)	Korea (Seoul)	I Believe by Jimmy Bondoc	96			

=== Gate 5: The Grand Destination ===
This gate is equivalent to final round.

The Himigration Officer will give score after each performance of the Touristars which will become the 50% of the total score. The remaining 50% will be from the public votes (Kababayan's Score). The winner as the Grand Touristar, will receive a 1-year singing contract, a vacation package and a plaque plus ₱2,000,000 (about £29,875, €37,950, US$42,850) cash.

==== Episode 20 (April 23, 2016) ====
Episode hashtag: #OPMGrandDestination

Guest performer/s: Arnel Pineda, Randy Santiago, Hajji Alejandro, James Reid

Opening song: Kay Ganda ng Ating Musika by Hajji Alejandro

Episode rating: 13.0%

Order	Touristar	Age	Flag	Country of Origin	Song and Artist/s	Guest Group	Total Score
1	Ryan Gallagher	27	(United States)	United States, (Michigan)	Narito by Gary Valenciano	Mandaluyong Children's Choir	23.27%
2	J Morning		(Korea)	Korea	Bulag, Pipi at Bingi by Freddie Aguilar		23.42%
3	Yohan Hwang	20	(Korea)	Korea (Seoul)	Wag Ka Nang Umiyak by Gary Valenciano	Liturgikon Vocal Ensemble	32.82%
4	Harris Dio Smith	30	(Pakistan)	Pakistan	Salamat by The Dawn	Philippine Army Band	20.50%

=== Elimination summary ===
General Did not perform on this episode. Already eliminated.

Gate 1: The Auditions Touristar gets at least 2 Approved stamp. Touristar gets at least 2 Denied stamp.

Gate 2: The Bump-off Highest score. Second highest score. Bumped-off or eliminated.

Gate 3: The Kababayan Bump-off and Gate 4: The Take Off Kababayan's Choice. Judge's Choice. Bumped-off or eliminated.

Gate 5: The Grand Destination I Love OPM Grand Touristar. 2nd Placer. 3rd Placer. 4th Placer.

				Gate																			
				The Auditions							The Bump-off						The Kababayan Bump-off				The Take Off [3]		The Grand Destination
Episode				1	2	3	4	5	6	7	8	9	10	11	12	13	14	15	16	17	18	19	20
Rank	Name	Age	Origin	Result																			
1	Yohan Hwang	20	(Korea)																				
2	J Morning		(Korea)																				
3	Ryan Gallagher	27	(United States)																				
4	Harris Dio Smith	30	(Pakistan)																				
5	Moses Akoh	26	(Nigeria)																		4		
6	Fathin Amira	23	(Singapore)																		4		
7	Naisa Lasalosi	21	(Australia)																	2	4		
8	DBD	26, 24, 25	(Korea) (Nigeria) (Australia)																		4		
9–12	Daniel Herrington	27	(United States)																				
9–12	UchuSentai:Noiz		(Japan)																				
9–12	Matthew May	36	(United Kingdom)																				
9–12	Jeena Dimaandal	20	(United States)																	2			
13–24	Reece Rostedt	23	(Australia)																				
13–24	Jeff James	27	(United States)																				
13–24	Anna Rabtsun	26	(Russia)																				
13–24	Marina Lin	19	(Thailand)																				
13–24	Sonata Stevenson	25	(United States)																				
13–24	Jonathan Wagner	28	(France)																				
13–24	Jerome McCuin	29	(United States)																				
13–24	In Seon Jung	27	(Korea)																				
13–24	Nelson Leausa	25	(Samoa)																				
13–24	Addy Raj Gaur	21	(India)																				
13–24	Sumner Mahaffey	22	(United States)													1							
13–24	Montri Bootnak	26	(Thailand)													1							
25–38	Soo Jin Lee	22	(Korea)																				
25–38	Raza Saeed	27	(Pakistan)																				
25–38	Victor Cervantes	38	(United States)																				
25–38	Mitch Smith, Sr.	52	(United States)																				
25–38	Flora Lee	27	(Korea)																				
25–38	Mango Singhi	29	(India)																				
25–38	Natalia Moon	24	(Australia)																				
25–38	Graceson Craig		(United Kingdom)																				
25–38	James Sze		(Singapore)																				
25–38	Briana Takada		(Palau)																				
25–38	Brigham Tauteoli		(Tonga)																				
25–38	Rizuan Rashid		(Singapore)																				
25–38	Talal Kuwailed Al Anazi		(Saudi Arabia)																				
25–38	Farid Ghosn		(United Arab Emirates)																				

== See also ==
- List of programs broadcast by ABS-CBN
