= Martin After Dark =

Philippine television talk show

- Title card
- Also known as: Martin Nievera After Dark
- Genre: Late-night talk show
- Presented by: Martin Nievera
- Country of origin: Philippines
- Original languages: English; Tagalog

Production
- Production locations: GMA Broadway Centrum, New Manila, Quezon City, Philippines 1988-93); Studio 2, ABS-CBN Broadcasting Center, Quezon City, Philippines (1993-98)
- Camera setup: Multiple-camera setup
- Running time: 60–90 minutes
- Production company: Backstage Productions

Original release
- Network: GMA Radio-Television Arts (1988–93); ABS-CBN (1993–98)
- Release: July 30, 1988 – November 28, 1998

Related
- Martin Late at Nite; Martin Late at Night

Martin After Dark (later retitled Martin Nievera After Dark) is a Philippine television talk show broadcast by GMA Radio-Television Arts and ABS-CBN. Hosted by Martin Nievera, it premiered on July 30, 1988. The show concluded on November 28, 1998.

== History ==
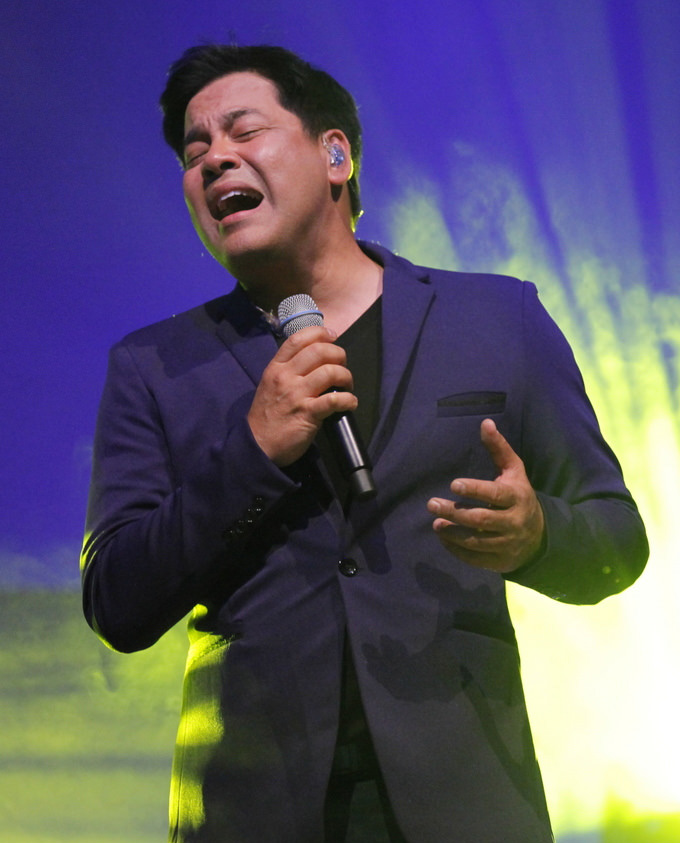
Martin Nievera serves as the host.

The show served as Nievera's comeback on GMA Network in 1988 after he and wife Pops Fernandez briefly left the network in 1987 to host "Twogether" on ABS-CBN. The show ushered an era on Philippine television where the Saturday late night timeslot is allotted for various guest celebrities and politicians to share their secrets on national television coupled with music and laughter. Martin was accompanied by "Lunch Date" co-host Jon Santos whose various stand-up impersonations before each commercial gap served as comic relief.

In 1992, the show exchanged time slots and broadcast days with the then-Sunday musical variety show "RSVP" which was hosted by Dawn Zulueta and Ariel Ureta. The GMA management's decision to exchange time slots reportedly did not sit well with Martin, but continued hosting the show.

In April 1993, "Martin After Dark" was pre-empted in two successive weeks by two television events aired by GMA: The Binibining Pilipinas pageant and the Film Academy of the Philippines (FAP) Awards night. The pre-emption of "MAD" for 2 weeks in favor of the 2 special events served as the last straw for the show's producer (Backstage Productions) and Martin, who eventually severed his ties with GMA Network and did not show up anymore when taping for the show resumed. The network aired reruns of "MAD" for a month while negotiations were underway to save the situation with the producers.

The show was eventually cancelled by GMA Network after negotiations bogged down. It was also reported that Martin Nievera and his producer have already decided to move to ABS-CBN while the show was pre-empted. Due to legal conflicts the transfer was delayed until October 1993. Upon the show's move to ABS-CBN, it was renamed as Martin Nievera After Dark.
