= Jeff James (musician) =

American singer and record producer (born 1988)

- Born: Jeffrey Howard James; November 18, 1988 (age 37)
- Occupations: Singer, Record Producer
- Years active: 2010–present

Jeffrey Howard James (born November 18, 1988) is an American singer and record producer. He became popular in the Philippines for his covers of Tagalog songs.

He participated in "You're My Foreignoy", a competition hosted by Philippine variety show Eat Bulaga!, and won the Dabarkad's Choice Award in the grand finals.

== Early life ==
James was born in Mililani, Hawaii. James' father is African Canadian and his mother is Mexican American. He graduated from Mililani High School and received a bachelor's degree in communication and media studies from Hawaii Pacific University.

== Career ==
In 2009, James formed a band called "Talk to You Music" (TTYM). The band later released the single "Hawaiian Girls."

On July 13, 2013, TTYM released an album called "Just Be Yourself".

On December 25, 2014, TTYM released an album called "GoGoGo" under GMA records in the Philippines.

In 2015, James joined Eat Bulaga's televised competition "You're My Foreignoy". The competition is a contest for non-Filipinos currently living in the Philippines who claim to have the heart of a true Filipino. He joined the contest in its last week and won the daily round and semifinals. In the semifinals he won the Dabarkad's Choice Award and Best in Talent award, as well as the title of "You're My Foreignoy Mindanao". During the "You're My Foreignoy" grand finals, James was again awarded the Dabarkad's Choice Award.

In 2017, James collaborated with rapper Tech N9ne on the track "Brand New Hunnids" from the rapper's Strange Reign album. James also released "Bayaning Tunay", a song dedicated to overseas Filipino workers. The song was released under GMA Music.

== Awards ==
After releasing their first single, TTYM won the Mai Tai Rumble, a battle of the bands in Hawaii. In 2011, James and Bryan Sanchez earned an Engineering Na Hoku Hanohano Award for "Hawaiian Girls".

In 2012, James's song "Good" reached number one on Hawaiian radio.

James won the 2013 Most Promising International Male Singer Performer of The Year by Top Brand Awards and People's Choice Asia Awards Best New International Male Performer 2013 for his songs "Let's Not Pretend" and "Hawaiian Girls".
