= Maa Tanuvasa =

Samoan gridiron football player (born 1970)

No. 98, 94
- Position: Defensive line

Personal information
- Born: November 6, 1970 (age 55); Nuʻuuli, American Samoa
- Listed height: 6 ft 2 in (1.88 m)
- Listed weight: 270 lb (122 kg)

Career information
- High school: Mililani (Mililani, Hawaii, U.S.)
- College: Hawaii
- NFL draft: 1993: 8th round, 209th overall pick

Career history
- Los Angeles Rams (1993); Pittsburgh Steelers (1994)*; Denver Broncos (1995–2000); San Diego Chargers (2001); Atlanta Falcons (2002)*
- * Offseason or practice squad member only

Awards and highlights
- 2× Super Bowl champion (XXXII, XXXIII)

Career NFL statistics
- Tackles: 155
- Sacks: 34
- FF / FR: 3 / 7
- Stats at Pro Football Reference

Maa Junior Tanuvasa (born November 6, 1970) is an American former professional football player who was a defensive lineman in the National Football League (NFL). He played college football for the Hawaii Rainbow Warriors. He was selected by the Los Angeles Rams in the eighth round of the 1993 NFL draft. He is best known for his time as a defensive end for the Denver Broncos from 1995 to 2000, during which they won two Super Bowl championships.

== Early life and college ==
Tanuvasa was an Interscholatic All-Star in football and track and field at Mililani High School in Mililani, Hawai'i. He moved on to the University of Hawaii, where he starred for three years, amassing 190 tackles and 10 sacks and helping Hawaii to the 1992 Western Athletic Conference championship.

== Professional career ==
He was selected in the eighth round by the Los Angeles Rams (209th overall) in the 1993 NFL draft and spent his rookie year with them. In 1994, he was cut by the Rams and spent a part of the season on the Pittsburgh Steelers' practice squad.

His first NFL season was with the Broncos in 1995, when he played one game. He worked his way into the rotation by the 1996 season, and by 1998, was a regular starter. He led the Broncos in sacks in the 1998 and 1999 seasons. He was on the Bronco teams which won the 1997 and 1998 Super Bowl championships.

After the 2000 season with the Broncos, he joined the San Diego Chargers for one year, and the Atlanta Falcons for the next. He since returned to his native Hawai'i, where he served as an assistant football coach at his alma mater, Mililani High School.

He was inducted into the Hawai'i Sports Hall of Fame in 2006.
