= Martin Late at Nite =

- Title card
- Genre: Late-night talk show
- Created by: ABS-CBN
- Developed by: ABS-CBN
- Presented by: Martin Nievera
- Theme music composer: Martin Nievera
- Opening theme: "Sweet Smile" by Martin Nievera
- Country of origin: Philippines
- Original languages: English; Tagalog

Production
- Production locations: Studio, ABS-CBN Broadcasting Center, Quezon City, Philippines
- Running time: 30 minutes

Original release
- Network: ABS-CBN
- Release: October 19, 1998 – August 29, 2003

Related
- Martin After Dark; Martin Late at Night

Martin Late at Nite (stylized as Martin Late @ Nite) is a Philippine television talk show broadcast by ABS-CBN. Hosted by Martin Nievera, it aired on the network's evening line-up from October 19, 1998 to August 29, 2003, replacing Martin After Dark, based from Late Night with Conan O'Brien.

== Final host ==
- Martin Nievera
