= Mililani High School =

Coordinates: 21.453263°N 158.009110°W

Location
- 95-1200 Meheula Parkway; Mililani, Hawaii 96789; United States

Information
- Type: Public, Co-educational
- Motto: "Excellence with Honor"
- Established: 1973
- School district: Hawaii Department of Education, Central District
- Principal: Frederick Murphy
- Teaching staff: 149.00 (FTE)
- Grades: 9–12
- Enrollment: 2,432 (2023–2024)
- Student to teacher ratio: 16.32
- Campus: Suburban
- Colors: Brown and gold
- Athletics: Oahu Interscholastic Association
- Mascot: Trojan
- Accreditation: Western Association of Schools and Colleges
- Newspaper: Trojan Times
- Yearbook: Na Mana’o Poina Ole
- Military: United States Army JROTC
- Website: Official website

Mililani High School is the only public high school located in Mililani Town CDP, City and County of Honolulu, Hawaii, U.S. on the island of Oʻahu. It is operated by the Hawaii Department of Education.

Serving an enrollment of over 2,600 students in grades 9–12, Mililani High School is one of the largest public schools in Hawaiʻi.

== Academics ==
Per the Board of Education, the school requires a total of 24 credits to graduate. These are six credits in electives, four credits in English, four credits in social studies, three credits in science, three credits in mathematics, two credits in either foreign language, fine arts, or Career and Technical Education, one credit in physical education, half a credit in health, and half a credit in a personal transition plan (PTP).

For dual-credit options, the school offers Advanced Placement classes (AP), early college, and Running Start. Early College and Running Start are run through the University of Hawaii (UH) system.

For Advanced Placement classes, the school hosts an AP Night, an event dedicated to teaching parents about the AP classes that are provided. All students are allowed to take an AP class, provided they attend AP Night and commit to taking the AP Exam and covering the associated costs. In the 2021–2022 school year, 50% of students took an AP exam, with a 30% passing rate. Between 2024 and 2026, the school will offer 23 Advanced Placement classes.

Early College allows for students to take college-level classes on campus. These classes are provided by instructors by the Leeward Community College, which is a part of the UH System.

Running Start is a program which, through a collaboration with the Hawaii Department of Education, allows for students to take college-level courses outside of the school. These courses are taken at UH colleges.

== Enrollment and demographics ==
As of the 2023–2024 school year, the school has a total of 2,432 students. Of this, 32% were considered Asian, 22% were considered Filipino, 21% were considered White, 12% were considered Native Hawaiian, 5% were considered Pacific Islander, 4% were considered Black, and 3% were considered Hispanic.

Based on data from the 2022–2023 school year, 17.8% were on free or reduced lunch, 9.9% had a disability, and 1.2% of students were English Language Learners.

== Athletics ==
Mililani High School offers a wide range of sports and can be found in the Red Division of the Oahu Interscholastic Association or OIA conference. Mililani High School's Boys Soccer team took first place in the Athletic Association Division 1 Soccer State Championship in 2012. Mililani High School's Varsity and Junior Varsity Cheerleading teams took first place in the American National Cheerleading Competition in Las Vegas, Nevada. In 2010, Mililani High School's Boys Basketball Division I defeated Moanalua High School at the Stan Sheriff Center in an overtime win for Consolation title with a score of 71–67. In 2014, the Mililani Trojans claimed their first football state championship against defending state champion Punahou by a score of 53–45. The Trojans won their second state title in football, defeating ʻIolani 31–20, in 2016.

== Extracurricular activities ==
Student activities are provided by the Associated Students of Mililani High School (ASMHS). The executive board is made of five students, who oversee events throughout the school year. In 2024, the council was recognized as a Gold Council of Excellence by the National Student Council.

As of the 2024–2025 school year, the school offers over 40 clubs for students.

== Notable alumni ==
Listed alphabetically by last name (year of graduation):

- Dustin Antolin – former MLB pitcher
- Rashaun Broadus – former professional basketball player
- James Fenderson – former NFL running back
- Dillon Gabriel (2019) – NFL quarterback, Cleveland Browns (2025–present)
- Jeff James – musician
- Jake Ingram – former NFL long snapper
- Angela Lee (2014) – former mixed martial artist, former ONE Championship Women's Atomweight Champion
- Christian Lee (2016) – mixed martial artist, former ONE Championship Lightweight Champion
- Victoria Lee (2022) – former mixed martial artist, ONE Championship
- Lauren Matsumoto – Minority Leader of the Hawaii House of Representatives
- McKenzie Milton (2016) – college football quarterback, UCF (2016–2020), FSU (2021)
- Darius Muasau (2019) – NFL linebacker, New York Giants (2024–present)
- Maggie Q (1997) – American actress, model, and animal rights activist
- Maa Tanuvasa (1988) – former NFL football player, Denver Broncos (1995–2000)

== See also ==
- Mililani Middle School
