= Martin Late at Night =

- Title card
- Genre: Late-night talk show
- Written by: Joaquin Acosta; Bernice Bautista
- Directed by: Arnel Natividad
- Presented by: Martin Nievera
- Country of origin: Philippines
- Original languages: English; Tagalog
- No. of episodes: 13

Production
- Executive producer: Marvi Gelito
- Running time: 45 minutes

Original release
- Network: ABS-CBN
- Release: March 1 – May 31, 2013

Martin Late at Night (stylized as Martin Late @ Night) was a Philippine talk show hosted by Martin Nievera. It aired from March 1 to May 31, 2013. It is a spin-off of the show Martin Late at Nite, based from Late Night with Jimmy Fallon.

== Production ==
The show airs every Friday nights at 11:30 pm–12:15 am after Bandila with another late-night show Banana Nite, a spin-off of Banana Split, that airs Mondays through Thursdays.

In 2011, the possibility of the show was first hinted during Nievera's contract signing for ABS-CBN. One of his reasons for signing the contract was the show. He told in an interview with the Philippine Entertainment Portal, "When I finally got my contract from ABS-CBN, I finally have a contract and they've included one show[...] I only signed it when they said it's a talk show."

On February 19, 2013, Nievera officially confirmed the show in his personal Twitter account. A teaser for the show was released on February 23, 2013, featuring Nievera dubbed as the "Big Mouth".

Since its first airing, the show was not well received and met low television ratings. From April 25–27, 2013, Nievera posted through his Twitter account a series of statements showing his grievance over the ABS-CBN Network executives for their "lack of support [on the show]." He said "You [ABS-CBN executives] can't blame me if I'm not rating like the prime-time shows if you don't support me like you support them. No band, no live audience? How?" He continued "I know I am no 'teleserye' or noontime show. But if I had [that much] support I would last longer. [I] can't stay in the fight alone. So sad." On May 1, the host expressed his apologies to the network executives and told he is "not upset."

In early May 2013, ABS-CBN confirmed the show's cancellation effective on May 31, 2013.

== Guests ==
The final episode's guests were singers Sarah Geronimo and Erik Santos.

== See also ==
- ASAP
- Martin Late at Nite
- Martin After Dark
- List of programs broadcast by ABS-CBN
- List of programs aired by ABS-CBN
