= Dustin Antolin =

American baseball player (born 1989)

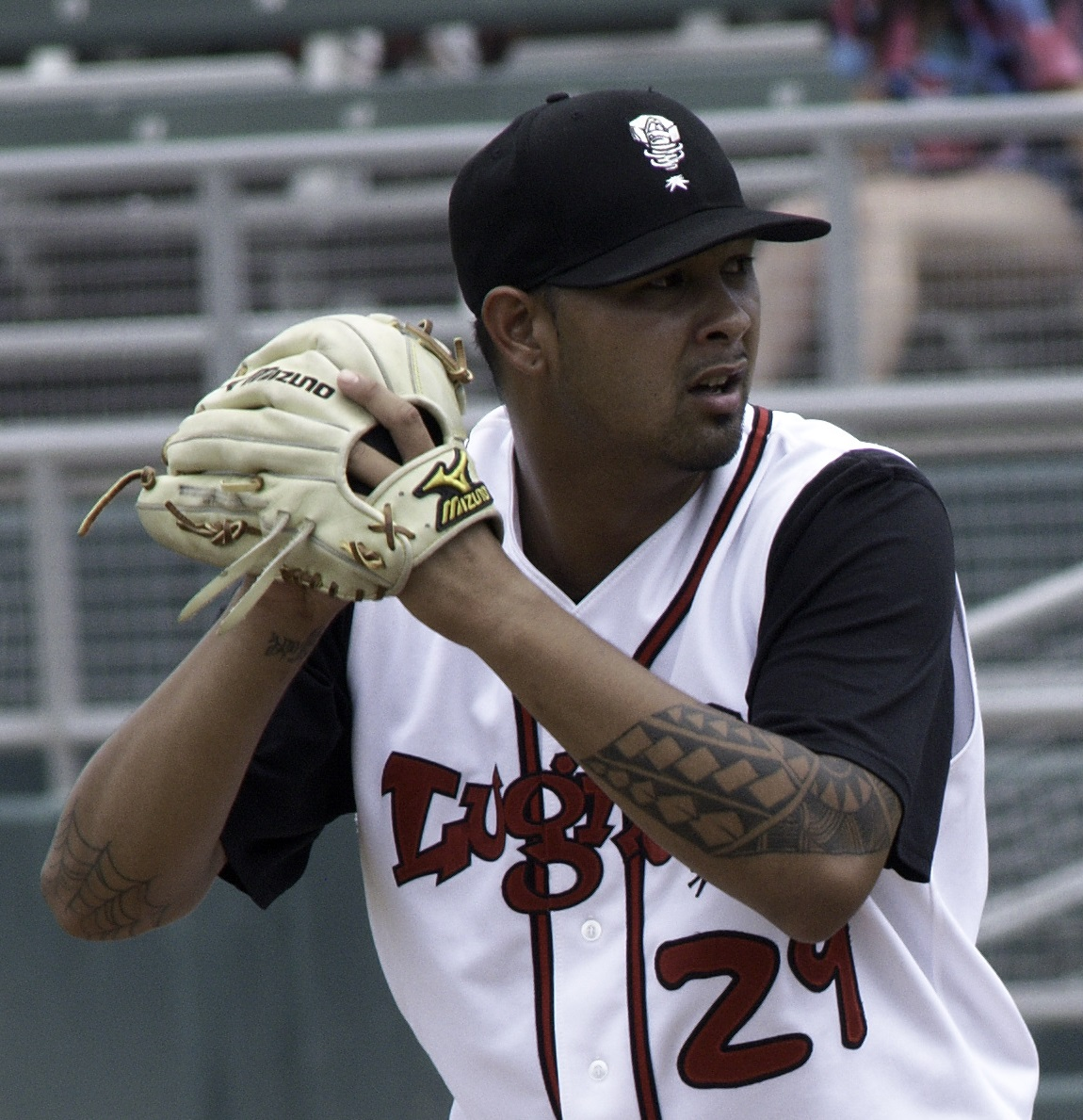
- Antolin with the Lansing Lugnuts in 2011
- Pitcher
- Born: August 9, 1989 (age 37); Mililani, Hawaii, U.S.
- Batted: Right Threw: Right

MLB debut
- May 16, 2016, for the Toronto Blue Jays

Last MLB appearance
- May 16, 2016, for the Toronto Blue Jays

MLB statistics
- Win–loss record: 0–0
- Earned run average: 13.50
- Strikeouts: 1
- Stats at Baseball Reference

Teams
- Toronto Blue Jays (2016)

Dustin Kamakana Mai Ku’u Makualani Antolin (born August 9, 1989) is an American former professional baseball pitcher, who played one game in Major League Baseball (MLB) for the Toronto Blue Jays.

== Professional career ==
=== Toronto Blue Jays ===
==== Minor leagues ====
Antolin was drafted by the Toronto Blue Jays out of Mililani High School in the 11th round of the 2008 Major League Baseball draft. He signed with the team soon after the draft, and was assigned to the Rookie-level Gulf Coast League Blue Jays for the remainder of the season. In 12 games, Antolin pitched to a 2–2 win–loss record, 4.64 earned run average (ERA), and 14 strikeouts in 21 1/3 innings pitched. He played the entire 2009 season with the Single–A Lansing Lugnuts, posting a 2–5 record, 4.47 ERA, and 40 strikeouts in 48 1/3 innings. Antolin remained with the Lugnuts in 2010, going 2–2 with a 2.93 ERA and 24 strikeouts in 27 2/3 innings pitched before undergoing Tommy John surgery.

Antolin missed the first half of the 2011 season recovering from surgery. After coming off the disabled list, he made 23 relief appearances for Lansing and one with the High–A Dunedin Blue Jays. In total for the season, he would pitch to a 4–2 win–loss record, 4.05 ERA, and 38 strikeouts in 33 1/3 innings. Antolin made the leap to Dunedin full-time in 2012, making a career-high 48 relief appearances totaling 59 innings. He finished the season with a 7–3 record, 4.58 ERA, and 47 strikeouts. Antolin split time in 2013 with Dunedin and the Double–A New Hampshire Fisher Cats. In 55 1/3 total innings, he would go 2–3 with a 7.64 ERA and 59 strikeouts. His high ERA was largely due to struggling at the Double–A level, where he pitched 32 1/3 innings and posted an 11.41 ERA. The following season Antolin pitched exclusively for the Fisher Cats, where he greatly improved upon his previous season. He pitched to a 4–6 record in 2014, with a 3.38 ERA and 52 strikeouts in 42 2/3 innings, and was named a mid-season All-Star.

Antolin remained with the Fisher Cats in 2015, pitching to a 4–3 record, 3.07 ERA, and 55 strikeouts in 55 2/3 innings. He would be promoted to the Triple–A Buffalo Bisons in 2016, and opened the season with a 1–1 win–loss, 2.70 ERA, and 3 saves before being called up by the Blue Jays.

==== Major leagues ====
On May 15, 2016, Antolin was promoted to the major leagues for the first time. He made his MLB debut on May 16, pitching 2 innings against the Tampa Bay Rays. The following day, Antolin was optioned back to Buffalo. He was designated for assignment on July 22. Antolin cleared waivers and was outrighted to Triple-A Buffalo the following day. He elected free agency following the season on November 7.

=== Washington Nationals ===
On November 21, 2016, Antolin signed a minor league contract with the Washington Nationals that included an invitation to spring training. He was reassigned to minor league camp on March 13, 2017, after pitching 2 1/3 innings with a 3.86 ERA. On July 15, the Nationals released Antolin.

=== Somerset Patriots ===
On July 19, 2017, Antolin signed with the Somerset Patriots of the Atlantic League of Professional Baseball. In the offseason, Antolin signed a minor-league contract with the Chicago White Sox, but was released prior to the start of the season. He re-signed with the Somerset Patriots on April 6, 2018. He became a free agent following the 2018 season.
