= UchuSentai:Noiz =

Japanese visual kei rock band

- Origin: Japan
- Genres: Alternative rock, pop punk, rap rock, electronic rock
- Years active: 1999–present
- Labels: indie
- Members: ANGEL-TAKA; MASATO; Kyo; Kotaro; YAMATO
- Past members: TAKEswiy; S@TT-on; TAKAYA; MANAV
- Website: uchusentainoiz.com Uchusentai:NOIZ Official facebook

UchuSentai:Noiz (宇宙戦隊NOIZ, Uchū Sentai Noizu) is a Japanese visual kei rock band originally formed in 1996. They are known for their energetic music and live shows, as well as their eccentric cosplay-like outfits. The band is also known for its dedication to humanitarian aid, visiting orphanages and typhoon-ravaged areas in the Philippines.

To date, the band has released ten albums, thirty-three singles and four foreign song cover videos. Their highest charting on the Oricon album chart is number 73 for METEORS.

UchuSentai:Noiz were contestants on I Love OPM, the ABS-CBN's singing reality competition for non-Filipinos who perform original Pilipino music; the band was part of the Top 24 of the competition.

== History ==
=== Founding as Noiz and early years (1996–2002) ===
Original members S@TT-ON and ANGEL-TAKA formed the band in 1996, originally named NOIZ. In 1999, former roadie MASATO was included into the band, and NOIZ released a mini album entitled Imitation PoPs in March of that year. In 2002, the concept of the band being a group of space warriors (宇宙戦隊 uchuu sentai) was introduced.

=== Imitation PoPs UchuSentai:Noiz (2002–2007) ===
The group released their first full-length album release, Cyborg Rock Show Kanzenban (サイボーグロックショウ完全盤, Saibōgu Rokku Shou Kanzenban) under the name Imitation PoPs UchuSentai:Noiz (Imitation PoPs 宇宙戦隊NOIZ) in the year 2003 with the members KYO and TAKEswiy as bassist and guitarist, respectively. Their second album release, Zero no keifu (ゼロの系譜) debuted on the Oricon album chart at number 240, while their third album EGO-Style broke the top 100 Oricon rankings in 2005.

=== UchuSentai:Noiz and lineup change (2007–2009) ===
In 2007, the band's name was shortened to UchuSentai:Noiz (宇宙戦隊NOIZ, Uchū Sentai Noizu), and the album Terra was released, containing 8 tracks previously released as singles along with 5 new recordings. The official fan club Miracle Rocket was launched in February 2007. The album Cube was released in October 2008, the band's last studio release with the five original band members. A compilation album, GREAT ROCK N ROLL HEROES was released in 2009, before members S@TT-ON and TAKEswiy announced their departure from the band, to be replaced by members KOTARO (guitar) and YAMATO (drums).

=== GENOM EMOTION, IMP, HIGH FIVE and "Narda" (2009–2012) ===
With the new lineup, the band released the free full-length album release GENOM EMOTION on November 9, 2010 on their official website. The year 2011 saw the release of the album IMP, as well as the final tour performance DVD JAPAN TOY'S PANIC TOUR KING OF ONEMAN & EVENT SHOW 2011 GENOM EMOTION FINAL ATTACK AT SHIBUYA O-EAST featuring the songs from GENOM EMOTION. The band released a mini album, HIGH FIVE, on May 2, 2012, before releasing a music video covering the Filipino rock band Kamikazee’s Narda in August to launch their Philippine tour.

=== METEORS and untitled album (2012–present) ===
Following their Philippine tour, the band released the full-length album ‘METEORS’ in September 2012 as UCHUSENTAI:NOIZ. In 2013, the band released the singles PRECOG, Parallel Mind, Corona, One Order and Laika, as well as the tour performance album METEORS FINAL ATTACK AT OSAKA Bigcat. The band's vocalist ANGEL-TAKA set out on a humanitarian mission to Tacloban, Philippines in December 2013, visiting the victims of Typhoon Yolanda (international name Haiyan) and sending school supplies to elementary school children.

A trilogy of videos was released in April 2014, featuring covers of Filipino songs: Liwanag sa Dilim by Rivermaya, Superhero by Rocksteddy, and Pinoy Ako by Orange and Lemons, to raise support for the victims of Typhoon Yolanda. UchuSentai:NOIZ returned to the Philippines in May 2014 to perform at the Best of Anime 2014 -Summer Live!- events in Manila and Davao City as well as announce their plans for a Philippine album release featuring the Filipino version of the song Happy tied and an English version of the song kanata (カナタ; "distance"), along with new original compositions.

== Band members ==
=== Current members ===
- ANGEL-TAKA (ANGEL VOICE MESSENGER) — lead vocals
- MASATO (HYPER SONIC GUITAR) — guitar, vocals
- 叫 (Kyo) (SUPER VIBRATOR) — bass
- 呼太郎 (Kotaro) (NEO ECCENTRIC GUITAR) — guitar (2009–present)
- YAMATO (MACHINEGUN BEAT GRAPPLER) — drums (2009–present)

=== Former members ===
- TAKEswiy (CLOCKWORK GUITAR) — guitar
- S@TT-on (MIX BEAT CREATOR) — drums
- TAKAYA — guitar (original lineup as NOIZ)
- MANAV — bass (original lineup as NOIZ)

== Discography ==
=== Albums as UchuSentai: NOIZ ===
Title	Release date
Meteors	September 26, 2012
HIGH FIVE	May 2, 2012
IMP	June 9, 2011
GENOM EMOTION	November 19, 2010
Great Rock 'N' Roll Heroes (Best of)	March 4, 2009
Cube	October 1, 2008
Terra	September 5, 2007

=== Singles ===
Title	Release date
Parallel Mind	2013
PRECOG	2013
laika	2013
ONE ORDER	2013
Corona	2013

=== DVDs and Compilation Albums as UchuSentai:Noiz ===
Title	Release date
CRUSH! -90's V-Rock best hit cover songs-	2012
Counteraction ―V-Rock covered Visual Anime songs Compilation―	2012
GENOM EMOTION Final Attack	2011

=== Albums under the name Imitation Pops UchuSentai:Noiz ===
Title	Release date
Uchuu Sentai kanzenban Cyborg Rock Show (宇宙戦隊サイボーグロックショウ完全盤)	August 20, 2003
ZERO No keifu (ゼロの系譜)	September 29, 2004
Ego-style	November 30, 2005

=== Singles and demos under the name Imitation Pops UchuSentai:Noiz ===
Title	Release date
Imitation Pops (Demo)	March 21, 1999
Komando No.0069 (コマンドNo.0069) (コマンドNo.0069)	August 19, 2001
(A + B) No.O-QT?	December 2002
0-Rei -	December 26, 2002
E O	January 2003
Ignition (イグニッション) (イグニッション)	February 2003
Uchuu Sentai Plasma Fun (宇宙戦隊プラズマ アミューズメント) (宇宙戦隊プラズマ☆アミューズメント)	April 7, 2004
'Chromosome Six (クロモソームシックス~ ~第六染色体)	June 9, 2004
Battle Capsule kara ai wo komete (バトルカプセルから愛を込めて) (バトルカプセルから愛を込めて)	August 11, 2004
Miracle Rocket G5 (ミラクル★ロケットG5) (ミラクル★ロケットG5)	May 18, 2005
From Skywalker (フロムスカイウォーカー) (フロムスカイウォーカー)	28, 2005
