= Yohan Hwang =

South Korean singer (born 1995)

Yohan King
- 요한킹
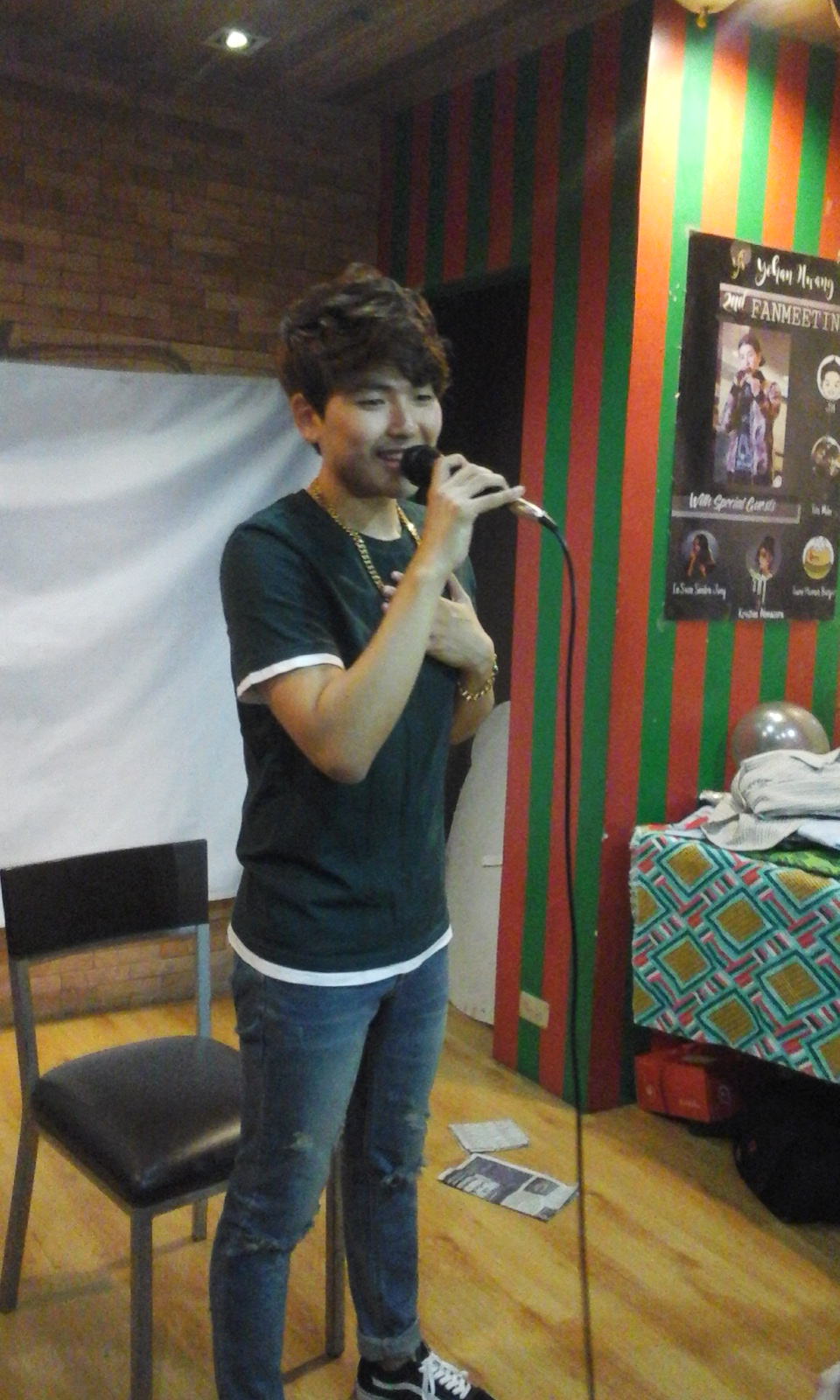
- Yohan King at a Meet and Greet event, 2016
- Born: Yohan Hwang; November 27, 1995 (age 30); Goyang, Gyeonggi-do, South Korea
- Occupation: Singer
- Musical career
- Genres: K-pop, OPM, Ballad
- Years active: 2016–present
- Labels: Star Music; Viva Entertainment

- Korean name
- Hangul: 황요한
- Hanja: 黃耀漢
- RR: Hwang Yohan
- MR: Hwang Yohan

Yohan Hwang, also known as Yohan King, (born November 27, 1995) is a South Korean singer based in Manila, Philippines. He rose to fame after joining and eventually winning the first season of I Love OPM. Yohan later went on to perform a Korean-language cover of the Yeng Constantino single "Ikaw" for the Tagalog-language dub of Love in the Moonlight.

== Biography ==
=== Early life and education ===
Yohan Hwang was born in Gyeonggi-do Goyang-si Ilsan, South Korea to South Korean parents. He has an older brother named Joseph and a younger sister. In 2014, his family moved to the Philippines, during which he continued his studies at the De La Salle College Antipolo.

=== Music career ===
==== 2016: I Love OPM ====
One time at a function in La Salle, he performed Side A's "Ako'y Sayo" after his friend recommended him to perform a Filipino song. The cheers he received gave him confidence and it marked the start of his love for singing. Not long after, he joined ABS-CBN's new television format I Love OPM wherein non-Filipino and 100% foreigners competed against each other in a singing competition, performing only Filipino songs and most notably the Original Pilipino Music (OPM) genre. During the first-season auditions of the said program, which aired on February 27, 2016, Hwang performed IAXE Band's "Ako'y Sa'Yo at Ika'y Akin", popularized by Daniel Padilla. He was given all three approved marks from the Himigration officers (or judges) Toni Gonzaga, Lani Misalucha, and Martin Nievera, stating that he sounded like a true Filipino and his rendition was beautiful.

Hwang advanced to the semi-finals after consistently receiving high scores and praises from both the judges and the studio audience. Along with Harris Dio Smith, Hwang was the first finalist to advance to the finals after garnering one of the two highest votes from the studio audience. J Morning and Ryan Gallagher joined them later on after gaining the approval from the judges. Both Hwang and J Morning are South Korean finalists.

During the grand finals held at the Resorts World Manila on April 23, he performed Sugarfree's "Huwag Ka Nang Umiyak" with the Liturgikon Vocal Ensemble. It was the first time throughout the show that he showed his vocal range rather than his usual soft and sweet ballad performances. Hwang explained that he decided to sing a powerful ballad because he wanted to show and to prove to the critics that he is serious with his singing. He eventually won against the other three finalists after receiving 32.82% of the combined votes from the judges and the public. He was proclaimed the winner at the end of the competition, winning 2 million pesos, a one-year recording contract from Star Music, and vacation package to Cebu. His winning song received praises from the judges. Gonzaga commented: "We were expecting that you were only going to serenade us..." while Misalucha added: "...you leveled up. You proved to us that you're more than just a heartthrob. You are a singing heartthrob." I Love OPM host Anne Curtis also remarked in a separate interview: "He did such an amazing job and I think he really proved himself. His purpose was to show everyone that he can really sing and that he is not just there to bring kilig to the audience. It radiated well in his heartfelt performance and I think that made him the Grand Touristar."

I Love OPM season 1 performances and results
Week	Song	Original Artist	Date	Result
Gate 1: The Audition	"Ako'y Sa'Yo at Ika'y Akin"	I-Axe	February 27, 2016	Three Approved marks (Toni Gonzaga, Martin Nievera, Lani Misalucha)
Gate 2: The Bump-Off	"Nasa 'Yo Na Ang Lahat"	Daniel Padilla	March 12, 2016	Judges' choice (92.3%)
Gate 3: The Kababayan Bump-off	"Gusto Kita"	Gino Padilla	April 2, 2016	Kababayan's Choice
Gate 4: The Take Off	"I Believe"	Jimmy Bondoc	April 17, 2016	Kababayan's Choice (with Harris Dio Smith)
Gate 5: The Grand Destination (live performance)	"Huwag Ka Nang Umiyak" (with Liturgikon Vocal Ensemble)	Gary Valenciano	April 23, 2016	Winner (32.82%)

== Filmography ==
=== Television ===
Year	Program Title	Role
2018	Wowowin	Himself/ Performer
2018	Tadhana: My Korean Fairy Tale	
2016	I Love OPM	Contestant
2016	The Kababayan Playlist Reunion Concert	Performer
2016	ASAP	Performer/ Guest Artist

== Awards and nominations ==
Year	Award Body	Category	Result
2016	I Love OPM	Grand Touristar	Won
2017	Push Awards	Push Performance Song Cover of the Year: Ikaw (Noege)	Nominated
