= Robin Nievera =

- Born: Roberto Martin Fernandez Nievera; November 30, 1986 (age 39)
- Education: De La Salle-College of Saint Benilde
- Occupations: Singer-songwriter; record producer; music video director; VJ; DJ
- Years active: 2010–present
- Parents: Martin Nievera (father); Pops Fernandez (mother)
- Relatives: Bert Nievera (grandfather)
- Musical career
- Genres: Rock; indie rock; blues rock; alternative pop
- Instruments: Vocals; guitar
- Labels: PolyEast; Homeworkz
- Website: robinnievera.com

Roberto Martin Fernandez Nievera (/njɛˈvɛərə/; born November 30, 1986) is a Filipino singer-songwriter and record producer. He is a former VJ for the music channel Myx and radio DJ at Wish 107.5.

The eldest child of singers Martin Nievera and Pops Fernandez, he began his own professional career as a VJ after winning Myx VJ Search 2010. At the time of this success, he was studying music production at De La Salle-College of Saint Benilde and serving as the vocalist and guitarist of an indie rock band. Nievera tried deviating from his musical parents as a child, but eventually became interested in music after learning to play the guitar in school.

In 2012, Nievera signed with PolyEast Records and released his debut album, the blues rock-influenced Overwait, for which he won New Male Recording Artist of the Year at the PMPC Star Awards for Music. He was the producer for No More Words (2012), a duet album by his parents. Nievera has since self-produced his subsequent albums. He mounted his first solo concert in 2013, in support of his second album, Nightmares (2012), which he had independently made available a few months prior. He signed with Homeworkz and released Dare, his third album which explored alternative pop, in stages throughout 2016, (Note: Dare was initially launched with the carrier single, "No More Light", in February 2016. The seven remaining tracks were each released monthly following that. The album itself was officially released on November 30, 2016.) during which he ventured into radio, hosting The Roadshow at Wish 107.5 until 2018. Nievera is currently based in Los Angeles, California.

== Life and career ==
=== 1986–2011: Early life and career beginnings ===
Roberto Martin Fernandez Nievera was born on November 30, 1986 to singers Martin Nievera and Pops Fernandez. He was named for his paternal grandfather (Roberto "Bert" Nievera) and his father. He has a younger brother named Martin Ramon (nicknamed "Ram"). Nievera made brief appearances in his parents' concerts as a child. He began singing and playing in church when he was around fourteen years old, although he had been trying to deviate from music. When he was under ten, Nievera had no intentions of becoming "a singer or anything in music". When he was twelve, he learned to play the guitar as a school requirement: "I picked [the guitar] out of laziness. In my school, you had to take either voice lessons, which meant reading notes – I didn't know how to do that – or learn piano, which looks very complicated because there are so many little keys." He also learned to play by observing other musicians. He became friends with the guitarists and other musicians in his church, who helped him master the instrument. Nievera joined a band at eighteen, during which he started to realize that "I want to do this. I really thought music was the one thing that I wanted to be better at."

Nievera began writing the songs for his debut album in 2008. He contributed one of these songs, "Smile", to Regine Velasquez's 2010 album, Fantasy. While studying music production at De La Salle-College of Saint Benilde and serving as the vocalist and guitarist of an indie rock band called Wagyu, Nievera won Myx VJ Search 2010 by the music channel Myx. He said he joined the competition because "I love talking. I love to talk besides making music [because] I like making people laugh. I like doing things with the camera." He stated that as a VJ, "I'm gonna give whatever I can give, which is my randomness and my dad's wit and my mom's quick mouth whatever that means." Nievera said of the start of his career, "Before I was just busy. I was just wasting time. Now, I'm busy, with a purpose."

=== 2012–2015: Overwait, Nightmares, and The Next Attraction ===
Nievera signed with PolyEast Records and launched Overwait on March 14, 2012. Discussing the album, he said: "The concept ... was to make original music and to sound different but not to sound like too foreign." A Philippine Daily Inquirer writer commented, "Robin Nievera is one fine blues guitar player. The evidence is on all ten tracks on this debut album, whose title, Overwait, is rich with self-deprecating wit." Nievera composed the entire album. He titled it as such because he said "I have been planning this album since I was fifteen." He initially presented only seven of his songs to PolyEast, which agreed to produce the six; the company soon decided to add four more. The album's lead single is "In 3's", which was followed by "Smile". The music video for "In 3's" premiered on Myx in April 2012 and hit the Pinoy Myx Countdown for weeks, while "Smile" made into Magic 89.9's Top 30 charts.

Nievera performed songs from Overwait as he opened for the American pop rock band Hanson on its Shout It Out World Tour in Manila on March 30, 2012. During this period, he was also producing his parents' duet album titled No More Words. It became available in May 2012 and also included "Smile" sung by the two. About this experience, he said: "I had so much fun producing for my parents and I'd like to produce for other people too." He has stated that he would rather choose to become a producer in the long run: "My mom and dad have been singing for thirty years and counting. I don't see myself singing for the next 30 years." In September 2012, Nievera won New Male Recording Artist of the Year for Overwait at the 4th PMPC Star Awards for Music. Nievera self-released Nightmares, his second album which he solely composed and produced, for free download from his website in December 2012.

In March 2013, Nievera embarked on his first solo show called The Nightmares Concert, based on the Nightmares album. It was held at Teatrino Greenhills in San Juan, Metro Manila, and also featured songs from Overwait and performances by The John Sung Band and The Walkie Talkies whose members were Nievera's classmates in college. Zia Quizon was a special guest. The show was produced by Pops Fernandez, Nievera's producer mother: "I guess my mom liked the songs and the album and she said you need to have a concert. So she planned out going to Teatrino, paying the downpayment. With everything else she said: 'You fix it, you pick the songs,'" he related. Nievera had recently signed with Viva Artists Agency, which he said "helped with rehearsals" for the show. The Nightmares Concert was also staged in Hong Kong, Singapore, and Japan between March and April. He was announced to host Daily Top Ten, a music show of Viva TV featuring up-and-coming Filipino musicians. At Myx Music Awards 2013, he was nominated for Favorite New Artist. Nievera was named Promising Male Singer / Performer of the Year at the 44th Box Office Entertainment Awards in May 2013.

In January 2014, Nievera said that he was planning "to do a lot of things, music-oriented, Internet-oriented, and out of music-oriented." He announced that his contract with PolyEast would expire at the end of the month, and he was "starting a new band but it's going to be an independent release." He explained that he "won't get a record label" because "I wanna do it on my own ... I wanna know how it works." Nievera had been conceptualizing a third album with his new band, which he was intending to release online for free download by June 2014. He was also reported to perform weekly at a newly opened music bar on Pioneer Street in Mandaluyong. Outside his music career, aside from hosting Daily Top Ten, Nievera had been selling real estate to be more productive.

In February 2015, Nievera mentioned that he was developing his own web series featuring emerging musicians which was to be released on YouTube. He mounted a concert, The Next Attraction, at the Music Museum in San Juan, Metro Manila in July 2015, with Isabella Gonzalez, Paolo Valenciano, and Karylle (children of his parents' contemporaries, Kuh Ledesma, Gary Valenciano, and Zsa Zsa Padilla, respectively). It was directed by Paolo Valenciano, with musical direction by Nievera, and was again produced by Fernandez. The Next Attraction was described by Kimberly L. Lee of The Philippine Star as a "family reunion" and was repeated twice in August.

=== 2016–present: Dare and DJing ===
Nievera signed with Homeworkz, an independent record label owned by Jay R. About this decision, Nievera said: "Jay R is a very good producer. He knows what he wants. He has mastered the sound he wants to sing for himself. Jay and I have our own opinions about the industry, which we talk about occasionally. I am over being disappointed with everything. I want to be the one to change things. Homeworkz has made me very comfortable with my career. I am working with people who feel the same way and want the same things." In February 2016, he unveiled his third album, Dare, with the release of the lead single, "No More Light". The album consists of eight tracks; the remaining songs were each released monthly thereafter, accompanied by a music video as a promotion. Dare itself was officially released on November 30, 2016, Nievera's birthday. He said that the album was "based on my feelings about my career as a musician/singer/producer for the past five years. I sing about how much I have struggled and if I should give up on this career. I saw it fitting to write these singles because of the irony, that I make a comeback singing songs about my frustrations." He said that he recorded the songs on his bed, having wrote them there and in his car.

During February 2016, Nievera was planning to start a food business. (He had been developing the same since 2014.) He was also reported to score an upcoming television series. In July 2016, Nievera performed with his father Martin in concert in Los Angeles, California. He also guested as a DJ on The Roadshow, FM radio station Wish 107.5's early evening program, in August 2016. He went on to become the regular host; according to Wish 107.5, "This gift of gab, along with his deep love for OPM and passion to support Filipino creativity, makes him a great roadshow host." He stayed on the program until 2018, when he was assigned to host Wish 107.5's new, similar program based in Hollywood; Nievera said, "[The management] gave me the job not only to be the DJ here, but to also make it work like how we've done in Manila. I've been The Roadshow's DJ for two years, and [the staff] there all taught me really well on how to do this, so I'm trying to do my best so that we can do the same way that we do it back home." Nievera had already started dating Quizon in 2017.

In 2019, Nievera was a special guest at his parents' Two-gether Again concerts in the United States and Canada. As of 2020, he is based in Los Angeles, California. There, Nievera has been collaborating with Buwi Meneses and Max Cogert—collectively known as Robin, Buwi & Max Trio—to write rock instrumentals and songs. In May 2020, they performed one of their compositions virtually as part of a campaign to promote safety during the COVID-19 pandemic.

== Artistry ==
=== Influences ===
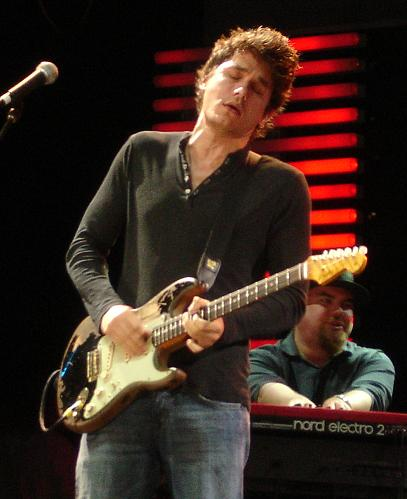
John Mayer, shown here in 2007, has influenced Nievera.

Nievera grew up listening to artists such as Dave Matthews Band, John Mayer, and Bon Iver, whom he cites among his biggest musical influences. Discussing Mayer, he has said: "John Mayer is certainly a role model. We both love the blues. If you listen to him, he also likes Jimi Hendrix, Stevie Ray Vaughan, and John Lee Hooker. That's why, we play similar guitar riffs." Nievera also admires the Beatles, Incubus, Coldplay, and U2. He likes Bono, U2's lead vocalist, for being "not just a musician, a rock star or a legend. He's also open to other things and he stands for a lot of good things." He would like to interview him, of which he said "I will ask him a lot of things about music and his take on all the things that's happening around the world. That would be a four-hour interview." Nievera enjoys "old, old music—blues, country, anything with the guitar" and also listens to "a little bit of Justin Timberlake."

Nievera has said that he owes his musical proficiency to his parents, singers Martin Nievera and Pops Fernandez, who brought him along to live performances and studio recording sessions as a child. He stated in 2012, "I mean, ever since I was a baby, everything around me was singing, music, tours, albums, recordings. So I've experienced it and I wanna see if I can do it. So, that's what I'm here now." He continues to receive advice from them, of which he said, "Whatever I do, even if it's not music, they will help me. So, both my parents will be part of my life and supporting me with whatever I do so they are helping me now." He considers them "the best performers in the world".

=== Musical style ===
"For me to 'step out of [my parents'] shadows' means I have to be following in their footsteps. I don't think I will ever be the next 'Concert King'. It isn't something I want. I will continue to be me. The most difficult part about this is how everyone will always compare me to them. There's nothing anyone can do about that—and I'll always be grateful for that. But I'm not like them. I will sing with them, and sing for them, but I'll be singing for the next set of music fans."

— Robin Nievera

Nievera's music contains elements of rock, indie rock, blues rock, and alternative pop. He says "it's more rock-oriented, it's loud, [because] that's the music I grew up with." He has described himself as "not commercial enough": "The biggest challenge, for me, wasn't finding a genre because I know the genre that I like. The biggest challenge is having people listen to me and understand that it's not the same as my parents' music."

As the son of Martin Nievera and Pops Fernandez, he is often compared to them, whose genre is pop and R&B. The Manila Standard wrote, "Here is a guy who could've milked the same tried-and-tested pop star formula dry, but chose instead to shed himself of all the trappings of stereotype and clichéd commercial success." Nievera has stated, "I love my parents' music and the songs that they've made in the past but I can't sing like my dad because his range is much higher than mine. Their voices are light years better than mine, and I had to creatively figure out a way to make my sound interesting to be relevant." His mother has added, "[He] really has a different music and style. When he first sang to us, I was also shocked. ... This is how he sounds, because he's actually very shy." Yahoo! News wrote, "His debut album Overwait luxuriates in blues-derived guitar riffarama, making you think the young Nievera could be distancing his own music from his parents' legacy. But as the album progresses, the first blush leads to surprise that Martin's first-born ... could carve out his own musical identity." He has clarified that he "wasn't trying to veer away from their music. I just knew that I wasn't made for it."

A Philippine Daily Inquirer writer has opined that Nievera's first two albums "were heavy on the guitar". According to Nievera, "Honestly, I was trying to show off. I guess I wanted to make a point, create a nice impression—a good first handshake, if you will. But I've matured since then." In Dare (2016), his next album, he experimented with his genre and explored alternative pop: "I usually write my songs on a guitar, and they usually turn out to be very riff-heavy. For Dare, I wrote the songs on a keyboard first, to make my chords easier to listen and sing to." He has described the album as "the 'poppiest' I will ever get with my music." He says that "my music really gets noisy but I'm taming it down for everybody."

Nievera uses his life experiences as an inspiration for his work. Since his debut as a recording artist, he has also been a strong supporter of OPM. He dedicated Overwait "to show people that OPM doesn't have to sound like typical OPM songs, and that it could be any kind of music." He has encouraged, "For OPM to grow, we should start writing our own songs. There's nothing wrong in covering other people's songs. It's just that for the past twenty years, there have been too many cover versions already." He has also said, "Everyone needs to be more proactive if you wanna be in the music scene. It's going to take more of that original music to make an impact. And that's what will happen next."

== Awards and nominations ==
List of awards and nominations
Award	Year (Note: Indicates the year of ceremony. Each year is linked to the article about the awards held that year, wherever possible.)	Recipient(s) and nominee(s)	Category	Result	Ref.
Box Office Entertainment Awards	2013	Robin Nievera	Promising Male Singer / Performer of the Year	Won	
Myx Music Awards	2013	Robin Nievera	Favorite New Artist	Nominated	
PMPC Star Awards for Music	2012	Robin Nievera for Overwait	New Male Recording Artist of the Year	Won (Note: Tied with DK Valdez for It's All About Love)	

== Discography ==
=== Albums ===
List of albums
Title	Album details
Overwait	Released: March 14, 2012; Label: PolyEast Records; Formats: CD
Nightmares	Released: December 2012; Label: Self-released; Formats: Digital download
Dare	Released: November 30, 2016; Label: Homeworkz; Formats: Digital download

=== Singles ===
List of singles
Title	Year	Album
"In 3's"	2012	Overwait
"Smile"	2012	Overwait
"No More Light"	2016	Dare

=== Songwriting credits ===
List of songs written or co-written for other artists, showing year released and album name
Title	Year	Artist	Album
"Smile"	2010	Regine Velasquez	Fantasy
"Smile"	2012	Martin Nievera and Pops Fernandez	No More Words
