= Bert Nievera =

Filipino-American singer and businessman

- Born: Roberto Jose Dela Cruz Nievera; October 17, 1936; Baguio, Commonwealth of the Philippines
- Died: March 27, 2018 (aged 81); Las Vegas, Nevada, United States
- Citizenship: Philippines; United States
- Education: University of the Philippines Diliman
- Occupations: Singer; businessman
- Years active: 1959–2017
- Spouses: Conchita Razon; Carol Hernandez
- Children: 6, including Martin
- Relatives: Robin Nievera (grandson)
- Musical career
- Genres: Easy listening; traditional pop; show tune; OPM
- Instrument: Vocals
- Labels: Silver Sword; Blackgold; WEA; RJ

Roberto Jose Dela Cruz Nievera (/njɛˈvɛərə/; October 17, 1936 – March 27, 2018) was a Filipino-American singer and businessman. He rose to prominence in 1959 after winning the "Search for Johnny Mathis of the Philippines", a singing contest on the television variety show Student Canteen. He was one of the original members of the Society of Seven (SOS).

Born in Baguio, Nievera grew up participating in many amateur singing contests. He studied at the University of the Philippines Diliman, where he was trained by National Artist for Theater Wilfrido Ma. Guerrero. He found moderate success in clubs singing as the "Johnny Mathis of the Philippines" after Student Canteen. Nievera then joined the Hawaii-based musical group the Fabulous Echoes in 1966, which later became the Society of Seven.

In 1976, following a decade-long stint with the SOS, Nievera released his self-titled debut album in Hollywood. He recorded three more albums released from 1978 to 1996. Nievera came back to the Philippines in 1989 and mounted a series of concerts called Timeless through the 1990s and the early 2000s, which earned him another moniker as the "Timeless Balladeer". He also endeavored into business by opening various restaurant franchises in the country. After it failed, Nievera returned to the United States in 2003, where he settled until his death in 2018 at the age of 81. He was the father of Martin Nievera, whom he inspired and mentored.

== Life and career ==
=== 1936–1957: Early life and education ===
Roberto Jose Dela Cruz Nievera was born on October 17, 1936 in Baguio, Philippines. His father, a doctor who worked for the transportation company Benguet Auto Line, was from the province of Ilocos Sur; his mother was from Bulacan. He also had a sister. At the age of seven, Nievera already started singing. The earliest song he learned was "Ang Binatang Caviteño" ("The Young Caviteño"), taught to him by his mother, which he often performed when she would ask him to sing to people. He joined many amateur singing contests in his hometown. As an elementary student at St. Louis School, Nievera wanted to become a priest; he also imagined himself becoming a doctor like his father.

Nievera attended the Baguio Military Institute and initially planned to enroll at the Philippine Military Academy. He eventually opted to study foreign service at the University of the Philippines Diliman, where he became a member of the UP Dramatic Club. Nievera later told in a 2001 interview, "From then on, my life changed completely." He received training from playwright Wilfrido Ma. Guerrero, who was the club's director: "Freddie [Ma. Guerrero] found out that I could sing. So he tried to mold me. During intermission in the plays, Freddie would ask me to sing". Nievera said that he realized he could pursue singing as a profession when he was sixteen, while also having ambitions of perhaps becoming a newscaster or a deejay.

=== 1958–1965: Career beginnings ===
He began singing professionally in 1958. He was a daily performer at the Airmen's Club of Camp John Hay in Baguio. In Manila, he continued to participate in amateur singing contests. Nievera joined the "Search for Johnny Mathis of the Philippines" on the television variety show Student Canteen in 1959. He went on to win the competition performing the song "It's Not for Me to Say". Nievera "nurtured" aspirations when he started singing, one of which was "to go to America." While performing at the Clover Theater in Manila for one week (which was one of his winnings from Student Canteen), he was accepted as a flight steward at Philippine Airlines (PAL): "I thought at that time that PAL was more stable than a showbiz career." He worked there so he could go to the United States, but later quit in 1960 because he was "confined to the domestic flights" and was never able to fly internationally.

He resumed his singing career by performing in clubs, including Ember's Club in Cubao where he was earning ₱15 a night. Nievera said that he initially struggled in the entertainment industry, which he observed was dominated by "sexy singers like Pilita Corrales and Carmen Soriano": "To be noticed ... we started imitating American singers." Two of Nievera's contemporaries, Eddie Mesa and Diomedes Maturan, were also dubbed the Filipino counterparts of foreign acts Elvis Presley and Perry Como, respectively. According to Nievera, "dapat noon may title ka, usong uso 'yan noon [you must have a title then because it was very popular]". Nievera met his first wife, Conchita Razon, who gave birth to twins Martin and Victoria in 1962. He was later offered to sing in the US.

=== 1966–1976: Society of Seven ===
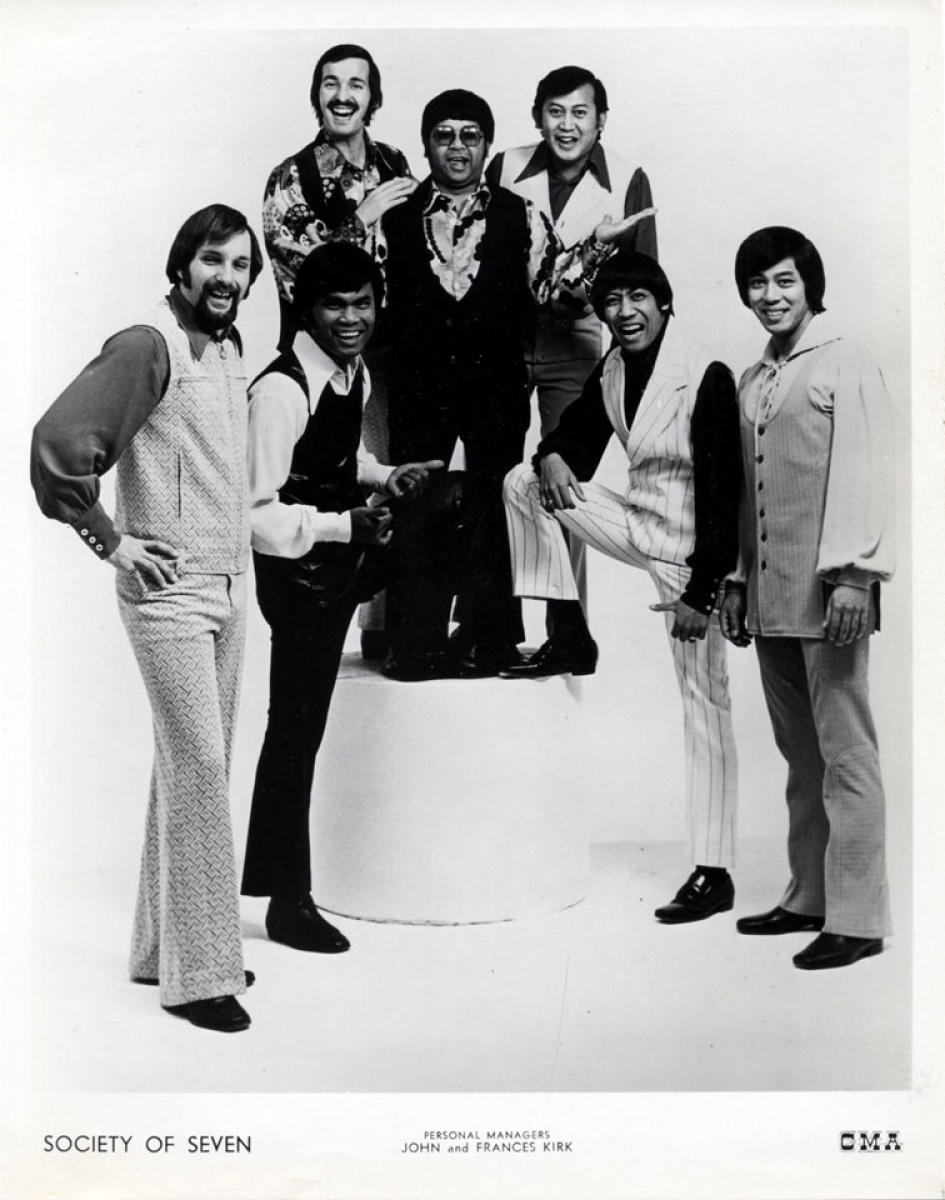
Nievera (rightmost) with the Society of Seven in a promotional print material

Nievera belonged in the original lineup of the Society of Seven (SOS), a Hawaii-based musical group of Filipino Americans formed in 1969. He joined in 1966, when it was still the Fabulous Echoes. Nievera had to learn to play a trombonium as it was required in their acts. Frannie Kirk, who previously managed the SOS and Nievera, said in 2018: "He was bleeding in the lips by the time he learned how to play it." Nievera eventually became the lead singer. When he was with the group, he was known as Roberto because two other members were also named Bert. The Society of Seven mainly performed at the Main Showroom of the Outrigger Waikiki.

Nievera and his family resided on the fifteenth floor of the Outrigger; his wife had separated with her first husband in the Philippines and fled with the twins to Hawaii when they were three years old. The couple soon had another child, a daughter named Rachel. Nievera inspired his son Martin to become a singer himself, who told in 2018 that he "would watch [his father] perform downstairs with the Society of Seven, and every night I would dream and imagine myself as one of the members of that group, singing for audiences both big and small." By the age of fourteen, around 1976, Martin was performing with him in Society of Seven shows. In Hawaii, they also owned a restaurant where Martin worked in the kitchen.

He toured with his group in Las Vegas, Los Angeles, San Francisco, and other major cities in the West Coast of the United States. Johnny Mathis saw Nievera perform Mathis' signature song in one of Society of Seven shows in Lake Tahoe. SOS manager Frannie Kirk recalled in 2018, "He was doing 'Misty', with eyes shut, and the real Johnny Mathis heard this voice and came to see where it was coming from. Roberto had his eyes shut and was surprised [to see Mathis] but was excited that he liked the act." In 1976, he left the SOS, after which he recorded and released his debut album, Nievera, in Hollywood through Silver Sword Production (which had also produced the SOS). Gary Bautista filled the vacant position left by Nievera's departure in 1980.

=== 1977–1989: Solo ventures ===
The Nieveras relocated to Concord, California. While working at a restaurant with his son Martin, he also taught him "The Greatest Love of All", showing him "how and when to belt and how to end the song in a big way." Martin performed the same song at the 1981 California State Talent Competition, which he won. Around this time, when his son was nineteen, Nievera and his wife were already having problems with their relationship.

According to a colleague, Nievera thought he was already retired from music after 1976, but he found gigs performing with Pilita Corrales, who invited him to her concerts. In 1978, he followed Nievera from the two previous years with another release, an all-Filipino album titled Sumasainyo, Nievera, under the Blackgold label of Vicor. His son began his own singing career in the Philippines in 1982. According to Martin, "Dad gave me a choice. He said, 'Stay in America and try your luck in Hollywood or come to the Philippines and let me help you start living your dream.'" Nievera arranged his son's first media interview after returning to the country.

In 1985, his third album, Nievera Remembers, was released by WEA. Nievera also came back to the Philippines in 1989. He and his wife separated, of which he later said in 2001, "Some good things never last. Something happened, so... I'm so lucky that I've found love the second time around." Carol Hernandez, his second wife, bore their child, son Lance, in c. 1989–1990. Nievera also took in Hernandez's three children from her previous marriage and his new family grew to include two more children who were adopted.

=== 1990–2002: Timeless ===
In the Philippines, he launched the Bert Nievera Music Lounge in Makati and also made guest appearances on television. Nievera himself began hosting on television, starring on IBC-13's Chairman of the Board. In 1991, he started embarking on a series of concerts titled Timeless at the Cultural Center of the Philippines Complex. Nievera described Timeless as a montage of his career's evolution. Accompanied by the Philippine Philharmonic Orchestra, he sang medleys of musicians Henry Mancini, Frank Sinatra, George Gershwin, Nat King Cole, the Platters, Michel Legrand, and George Canseco, along with songs from Broadway. Martin also performed, as well as other guests of Nievera's choice.

In 1994, Nievera and his wife organized the concert of Italian opera singer Luciano Pavarotti at the Philippine International Convention Center. He recorded another album titled Salamat sa Pag-ibig, his fourth and last, released in 1996 by RJ Productions. Its song "A Christmas Lullaby" won the 1997 Awit Award for Best Christmas Recording. He also contributed to Martin's 1999 album Return to Forever, singing a duet of Jeffrey Osborne's "The Greatest Love Affair". Nievera concurrently traveled to Australia, the Middle East, US, Brunei, Singapore, and Malaysia to perform; Malaysian Prime Minister Mahathir Mohamad also employed him several times. Timeless ran until 2002 after nine iterations, which earned Nievera another moniker as the "Timeless Balladeer". Nievera said that "the word 'timeless' just came up during our brainstorming and that was it. 'Timeless' is the word that best describes what I've been and what I'm still doing.

=== 2003–2018: Business activities and death ===
Nievera and his wife Hernandez, a businesswoman, owned the Philippine franchises of Hard Rock Cafe and Bubba Gump Shrimp Company. The couple had also opened the country's first branch of the international food chain Country Waffles in 2000. They went on to establish more Country Waffles restaurants around Metro Manila and in Baguio, the investors of which were mostly entrepreneurs and celebrity friends. In early 2004, some Country Waffles outlets began closing down as the Nieveras sparked "what's probably the decade's biggest food industry scandal" after fleeing to the US in late 2003, amid purported death threats from Country Waffles employees, angering the investors who did not receive returns. During this period, the National Bureau of Investigation sought to file charges against them after several investor complaints. In 2006, the Department of Justice charged them with fraud for allegedly failing to pay ₱14.5 million to an investor and for issuing unlicensed securities.

Nievera settled into semi-retirement in Las Vegas with Hernandez. In 2009, his 1978 album Sumasainyo, Nievera was reissued by Vicor Music. After performing in Toms River, New Jersey, he told in 2013, when asked about voting in that year's Philippine general election, that "I'm no longer in touch with what's happening in the Philippines. ... I watch the news but I never saw the candidates talk yet, or give speeches in their campaign so I cannot tell." Martin mentioned in a 2017 interview that his father suffered a brain seizure. Martin had still occasionally performed with him in concerts in the US, the last of which was a Christmas 2017 show at the Suncoast Hotel and Casino. At 3:37 a.m. on March 27, 2018, Nievera died at the Southern Hills Hospital & Medical Center, at the age of 81. The cause of death was multiple organ failure due to sepsis. Celebrities in the Philippines paid tribute to him on social media, while Martin, with the Society of Seven, dedicated to him his Las Vegas concert that April.

== Artistry ==
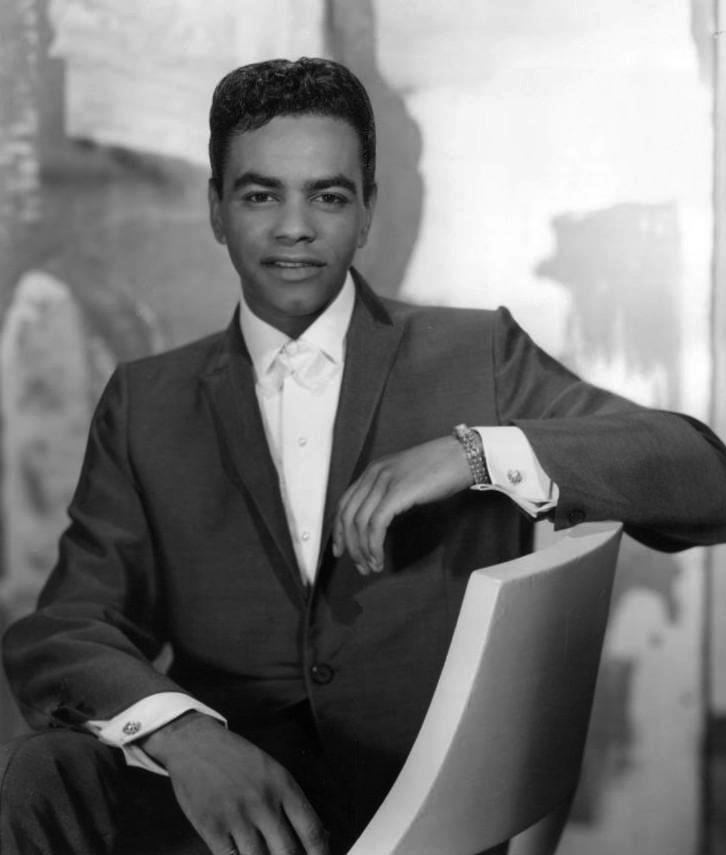
Johnny Mathis in 1960

Nievera was a baritone. His voice has been described by some publications as "smooth" and "velvety". A 1991 issue of the magazine Asiaweek read that Nievera's "mellow style ... took the Philippines by storm". While in college, Nievera was also coached by one of his colleagues, who was an opera singer. However, he said that he "found it monotonous, so after only two sessions nag-drop out na ako [I dropped out]. I resorted to self-study ..." He added, "Through the years, I developed my own style, my own technique. Who knows, had I continued my lessons ... baka naging opera/classical singer ako [I might have become an opera/classical singer]." Nievera said in 2001 that "I learned a lot from the Society of Seven."

Besides Johnny Mathis, whom he stated "was harder to impersonate than you'd think", his musical influences included Perry Como, Vic Damone, Mario Lanza, and Jo Stafford. He said he grew up listening to their ballads, which he termed "semi-classics", such as "Be My Love", "No Other Love", "Till the End of Time", "If You Are But a Dream", and "Innamorata". Nievera also considered "Misty", Mathis' signature song, to be his during his first few years in the show business as the "Johnny Mathis of the Philippines" after his success on Student Canteen in 1959. He mentioned, "It was very popular then, very memorable to me. ... The line in it that touches me the most is the last one... I'm too misty and too much in love."

He heavily inspired his son Martin, who said:

As a singer, he always told me to look into the eyes of my audience and not just in their general direction. This is why you never see me looking in just one place when I sing. My face, my eyes, even my body pan the audience left to right and right to left again, just like how a ... cameraman would do when directed to. For dad, the only way to one's soul is through his or her eyes. He would tell me, "Ask yourself this question before you go out onstage, do you want to just sing a song or change a life?"

== Discography ==
- Nievera (1976)
- Sumasainyo, Nievera ("Yours, Nievera") (1978)
- Nievera Remembers (1985)
- All This Time (1991)
- Salamat sa Pag-ibig ("Thank You for the Love") (1996)

=== Singles ===
- "Kapwa Ko Mahal Ko" (1978) (original by Ric Manrique Jr.)

== See also ==
- Honorific nicknames in popular music
