= Mililani, Hawaii =

City in Hawaii, United States

Mililani
- City
- Location in Honolulu County and the state of Hawaii

- Location in Hawaii
- Coordinates: 21°26′45″N 158°0′51″W
- Country: United States
- State: Hawaii
- City & County: Honolulu

Area
  - Total: 6.6 sq mi (17.1 km^{2})
  - Land: 6.6 sq mi (17.1 km^{2})
  - Water: 0 sq mi (0.0 km^{2})
- Elevation: 627 ft (191 m)

Population (2010)
  - Total: 48,668
  - Density: 7,370/sq mi (2,850/km^{2})
- Time zone: UTC-10 (Hawaiʻi-Aleutian)
- ZIP code: 96789
- Area code: 808
- GNIS feature ID: 2414101

Mililani (Hawaiian pronunciation: [miliˈlɐni]) is a city located near the center of the island of Oʻahu in Honolulu County, Hawaiʻi, United States. It consists of two census-designated places, Mililani Town, with a population of 28,121 at the 2020 census, and Mililani Mauka, with a 2020 census population of 21,075.

== History ==
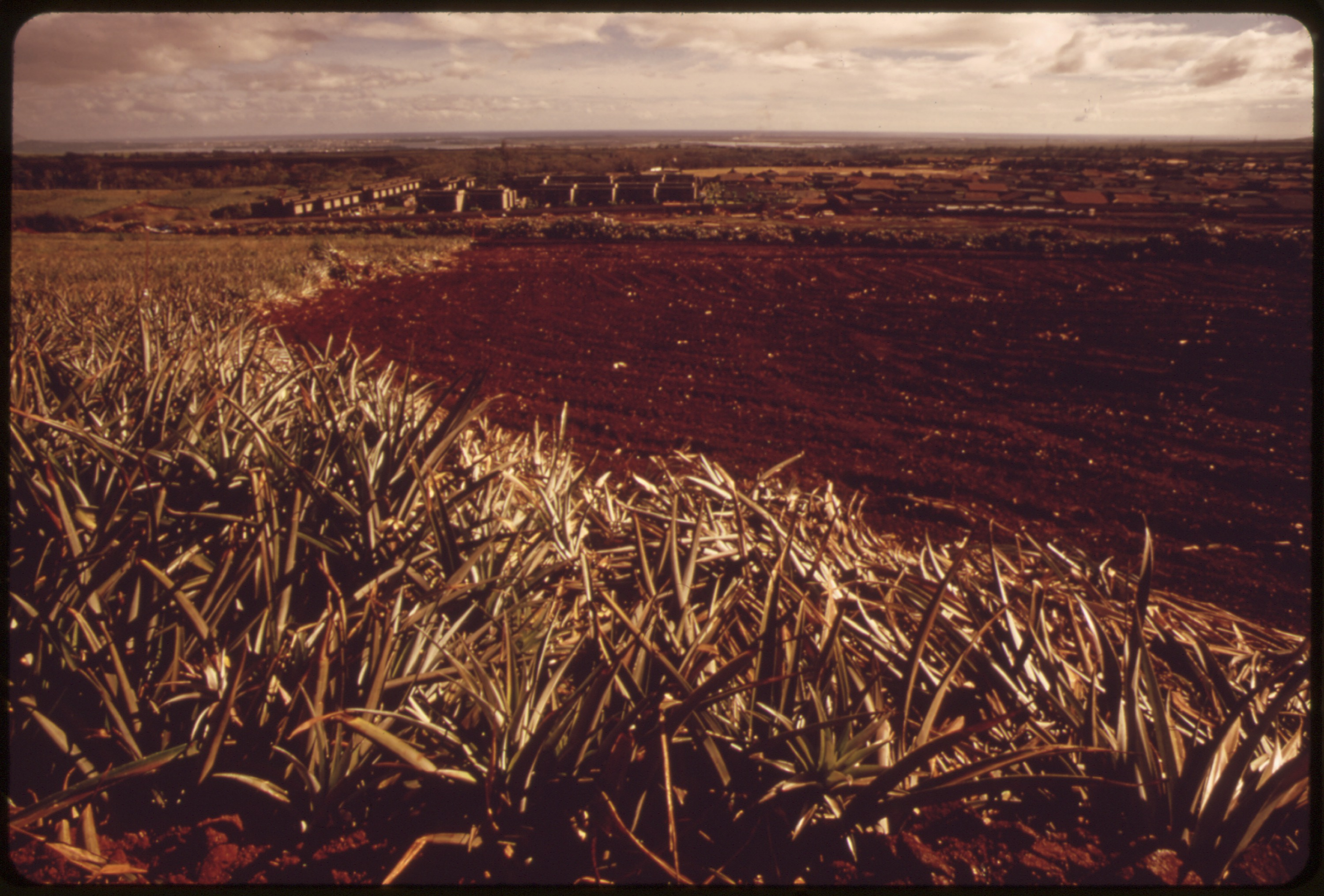
Pineapple fields in Mililani Town, 1973. Photo by Charles O'Rear.

Mililani sits on former plantation fields owned by Castle & Cooke, which began planning for its development in 1958 under its Oceanic Properties subsidiary. Castle & Cooke's plan was to collaborate with planners and architects on making Mililani Town a satellite city that would satisfy Oʻahu's pent-up demand for housing with a new affordable community. It was planned to eventually support a population of 75,000 people. Architect and developer Al Boeke, who would later create the planned community of Sea Ranch, California, was the development director of Mililani. The first homes in Mililani went on sale on June 23, 1968.

In 1976, Interstate H-2 opened for Mililani, cutting travel time from Mililani to Honolulu in half. In 1986, Mililani was named an All-America City in recognition of a community effort to clean up drinking water contaminated with agricultural pesticides. It is the only community in Hawaiʻi ever to receive this distinction.

On April 6, 1990, ground was broken for Mililani Mauka, a newer and more upscale community east of the Interstate H-2. The first homeowners moved into Mauka in 1992.

In 2003, Mililani was designated as the pilot site for the City and County of Honolulu's curbside recycling program. In 2005, Money magazine named Mililani as one of the best places to live in the U.S. In 2006, Mililani ʻIke Elementary School first grade teacher Phyllis Nakama-Kawamoto was named Hawaiʻi's American Star of Teaching by the U.S. Department of Education.

== Description ==
Mililani is the third wealthiest zip code (96789) in the state of Hawaiʻi, according to the 2006 ranking by Pacific Business News. Although it is largely a bedroom community for Honolulu, Mililani has its own commercial shopping centers, schools (such as Mililani High School), parks, community centers, and a golf course. Mililani homeowners must pay dues to the Mililani Town Association, which enforces covenants and design standards, and provides recreational facilities including several pools.

The Mililani Golf Club is a par-72, 6,455-yard course that is open to the public. The Mililani Technology Park is a nearby campus-like park that is zoned for high-tech industries.

The older portion of Mililani to the west of Interstate H-2 is known as Mililani Town. The newer portion of Mililani to the east of Interstate H-2 is known as Mililani Mauka. Almost all of Mililani's commercial and retail centers are in Mililani Town. A third region of Mililani is Launani Valley, a secluded, master planned development located below Mililani Tech Park on Wikao Street. The area was developed by Towne and contains a blend of townhome and single family units.

== Geography ==
Mililani Town is located near the center of Oʻahu Island, on the plateau or "central valley" between the two volcanic mountains that comprise the island. It is in the Central District and the City & County of Honolulu. The town is somewhat physically confined between the two large central Oʻahu gulches of Waikele and Kīpapa.

Travelling north on either Kamehameha Highway (State Rte. 99) or Interstate H-2 connects the traveller with Wahiawā. Travelling south on either of these arteries connects to Waipiʻo.

According to the United States Census Bureau, the Mililani Town CDP has a total area of 4.0 square miles (10.4 km^{2}), of which 7,386 square metres (79,500 sq ft), or 0.07%, is water.

== Demographics ==
As of the census of 2020, there were 28,121 people, 8,934 households, and 3.07 people per household. The population density was 7,014.5 people per square mile. There were 9,272 housing units and the owner-occupied housing unit rate was 79.7%. The racial makeup of the CDP was 48.1% Asian, 14.0% White, 2.4% African American, 4.6% Pacific Islander, and 10.9% were Hispanic or Latino. 30.0% were two or more races.

There were 9,010 households, out of which 43.1% had children under the age of 18 living with them, 70.4% were married couples living together, 10.2% had a female householder with no husband present, and 14.6% were non-families. 10.6% of all households were made up of individuals, and 2.0% had someone living alone who was 65 years of age or older. The average household size was 3.17 and the average family size was 3.41.

In the CDP, the population was 25.5% under the age of 18, 9.2% from 18 to 24, 28.4% from 25 to 44, 28.1% from 45 to 64, and 7.1% who were 65 years of age or older. The median age was 36 years. For every 100 females, there were 99.7 males. For every 100 females age 18 and over, there were 98.1 males.

The median income for a household in the CDP was $73,067, and the median income for a family was $76,338. Males had a median income of $47,051 versus $31,976 for females. The per capita income for the CDP was $24,427. About 2.5% of families and 3.2% of the population were below the poverty line, including 4.2% of those under age 18 and 1.6% of those age 65 or over.

== Government and infrastructure ==
In 2017, the state approved NRG Energy, Inc. to build a 14.7 megawatt solar farm project near Mililani called Lanikuhana Solar. Hawaiian Electric Companies (HECO) will buy electricity from this solar farm at 11.4 cents per kilowatt-hour (kWh) for 22 years. On September 10, 2019, the 14.7 megawatt Mililani Solar II developed by Clearway Energy Group began its operation alongside the Mililani Agricultural Park. Originally started by the developer SunEdison, Hawaiian Electric broke its ties to the firm in February 2016 before SunEdison's bankruptcy proceedings. San Francisco-based Clearway's predecessor the NRG Energy's Community Solar division, took over the project at the end of November 2016. On January 22, 2019, the Clearway Energy Group obtained NRG Community Solar's assets.

In March 2019, the Public Utilities Commission approved Clearway Energy Group to build a 39 megawatt solar farm with a 39 MW / 156 megawatt-hour battery storage project near Mililani called Mililani Solar I. HECO will buy electricity from this solar-plus-storage project at 9 cents per kilowatt-hour (kWh). The Mililani Solar I project was completed by Clearway in 2022.

== Education ==
Public schools in Mililani are operated by the Hawaiʻi Department of Education.

Elementary schools in the CDP include Kīpapa, Mililani Uka, and Mililani Waena. Mililani High School is located inside the CDP.

Hanalani Schools is a private school located in Mililani. It has over 600 students spanning pre-K through 12th grade as of 2022.

The following schools have Mililani postal addresses but are in the Mililani Mauka CDP: Mililani Mauka Elementary School, Mililani ʻIke Elementary School, and Mililani Middle School.

== Community centers ==
The Honbushin International Center, a Japanese community and religious center, is located in Mililani.

== Notable people ==
- Dustin Antolin, former Major League Baseball player
- JoAnne S. Bass, Chief Master Sergeant of the Air Force, first female top enlisted person of any American military service
- Dillon Gabriel, Cleveland Browns quarterback
- McKenzie Milton, former college football quarterback
- Margaret Denise Quigley, American actress, activist, and model
- Maa Tanuvasa, former American football defensive end, two time Super Bowl champion for Denver Broncos
- Tasya van Ree, painter and photographer
