= Martin Nievera =

Filipino singer and songwriter (born 1963)

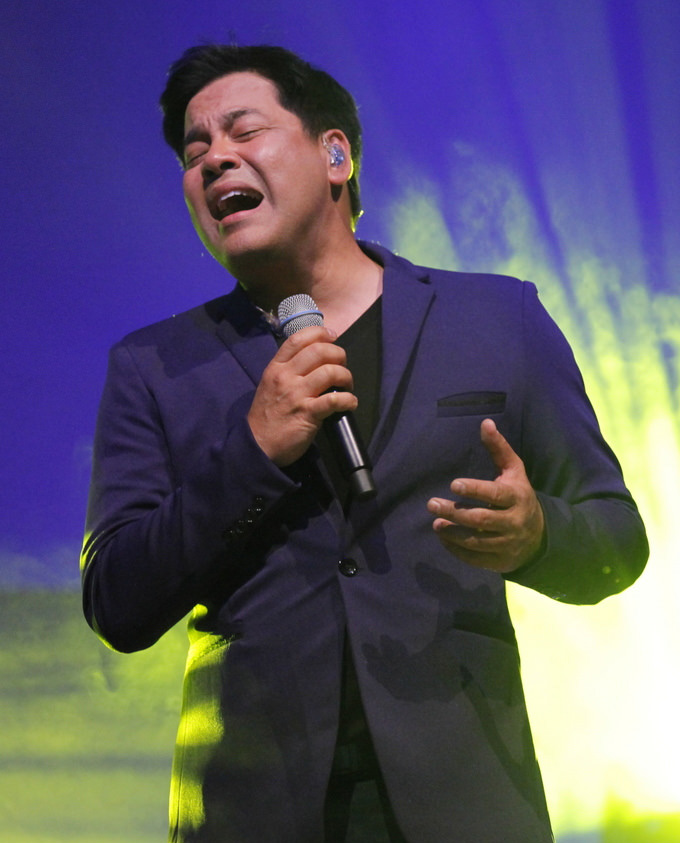
- Nievera performing in 2015
- Born: Martin Ramon Razon Nievera; February 5, 1962 (age 64); Manila, Philippines
- Citizenship: Philippines; United States
- Occupations: Singer; songwriter
- Years active: 1982–present
- Spouse: Pops Fernandez (m. 1986; ann. 2000)
- Partner: Katrina Ojeda (1996 – before 2015)
- Children: 3, including Robin
- Father: Roberto Nievera
- Relatives: Jackie Lou Blanco (cousin); Pilita Corrales (aunt); Janine Gutierrez (niece); IC Mendoza (nephew)
- Musical career
- Genres: OPM; vocal; pop; soft rock; easy listening; show tune; traditional pop
- Instrument: Vocals
- Labels: Vicor; Dyna; PolyCosmic; MCA; EMI; PolyEast; Universal

Martin Ramon Razon Nievera (born February 5, 1962) is a Filipino singer and songwriter. Known for his contemporary love ballads and on-stage personality, he is celebrated as one of the most important figures in local Filipino music. With a career spanning four decades, he has garnered 18 platinum, 5 double platinum, 3 triple platinum, and 1 quadruple platinum albums, listing him among the highest-selling Filipino recording artists of all time.

Nievera began his career in 1982 with the release of his debut album Martin… Take One, achieving platinum status in five months. In the succeeding years, Nievera also ventured into hosting and acting. He has appeared in eleven movies and seven television series and specials, most notable being Penthouse Live! (1984) with Pops Fernandez, Martin After Dark (1988) and ASAP (1995).

His music covers a variety of genres ranging from pop, soft rock, adult contemporary to gospel and dance music. Among his most successful releases includes the multi-platinum sellers Forever (1998), Forever, Forever (1999) and My Souvenirs (2001). In 2002, Nievera was named 'Entertainer of the Year' at the 25th Awit Awards for the third time. He became the first artist to win the award for three consecutive years, elevating him to the Hall of Fame alongside the likes of Pilita Corrales and Celeste Legaspi.

Dubbed as the "Philippines' Concert King" by the media, he was the first Filipino solo male artist and second overall (after Lea Salonga) to stage a full-length concert at the Music Center's Walt Disney Concert Hall. He was also the first Filipino solo male artist to headline a concert at the John Anson Ford Amphitheatre and the Hollywood Bowl. In 1984, he headlined a concert in front of 45,000 crowd at the PhilSports Football and Athletics Stadium. In 1988, he was named 'Best Male Singer' and 'Star of the Year' by the Honolulu Star-Advertiser in Hawaii. He also won as 'Best Interpreter' at the 1990 Abu Golden Kite Awards in Malaysia. Nievera has already performed alongside renowned artists such as David Foster, David Pomeranz, and Michael Bublé.

== Early life ==
Martin Ramon Razon Nievera was born on February 5, 1963 in Manila to singer Bert Nievera and Conchita Razon. He has a twin sister, Victoria (nicknamed "Vicki"); a younger sister, Rachel; and many siblings from his parents' other unions. His father was a member of the Hawaii-based singing troupe Society of Seven. His mother separated from her first husband and fled with the twins to Hawaii when they were three years old to live there with Bert. Attending elementary and high school in Hawaii, he said that he was regularly bullied by his classmates because of his appearance and "I wore a belt and shoes, so they thought belt and shoes meant mayaman ka [you are rich]. I would get beaten up for my lunch money, so my twin sister Vicki would defend me in school. The following day mas nabugbog ako [I was beaten more] because na-defend ako ng babae [I was defended by a girl]."

Nievera developed an interest in music, particularly in singing, at an early age. In their first year in Hawaii, the family resided on the fifteenth floor of the Outrigger Hotel, and the young Nievera "would watch him [his father] perform downstairs with the Society of Seven, and every night I would dream and imagine myself as one of the members of that group, singing for audiences both big and small." While working as a burger flipper at a restaurant that his family owned in Hawaii or at another family-owned restaurant, called Roadrunner Burgers, in Concord, California (where they would eventually move to), Nievera received singing lessons from his father, learning "how and when to belt and how to end the song in a big way." By the age of fourteen, he was performing with him in Society of Seven shows. Nievera said in 2018, "It all happened in the main showroom in that Outrigger Hotel [...] That room is now known as the Blue Note Hawaii, and I still perform there to this day. It has become a very sacred room for me probably because that's where dad gave me my first set of wings."

"I was actually discovered while singing at the shower in our locker room. I was part of the basketball team, but not a very good one at that, and I intentionally take a shower after everybody else has so it would seem like I had a tough game when I was actually a bench warmer… As I was singing, the wrestling coach passed by and heard me, called out loud and said he should see me at the choir auditions the next day. So I joined the choir and next thing I know I am singing back up (in a choir) for Barry Manilow for his three-day concert, and that’s where I realized that this is what I want to do."

— Martin Nievera

In the 1970s, the family relocated to the San Francisco Bay Area in California. Nievera enrolled at Clayton Valley High School in Concord, where he was a member of the basketball team. He was encouraged by the school's wrestling coach to enter the choir, impressed by a rendition of Morris Albert's "Feelings" that Nievera sang while showering in the locker room. Bert posited that his son began to realize "he could sing professionally" when he was sixteen, the same age when he did. Aside from his father, who always supported his singing, Nievera also credits for his talent his Cebuana maternal grandmother, Lourdes Corrales, a famous mezzo-soprano opera singer and radio personality in 1940s Philippines. Unlike his father Bert, his mother Conchita was against his dream, instead wanting him to become a doctor or a lawyer. "She knew what she [his grandmother] and my father went through [...] the [show] business takes a lot out of you," Nievera related and said his mother told him.

== Career ==
After graduating from Clayton Valley in 1980, Nievera joined the 1981 California State Talent Competition in Santa Clara, in which he won. As contestant number 1049, he competed against over four thousand other contestants for "[f]our days long [...] you had to win the first day to compete the second day to compete the third day. The third day was the championship, the fourth day is a championship of all the champions of the different categories. So I won the third day, then I won the overall grand champion." Nievera said of his victory, "It was a big moment in my life. That was when I knew I was gonna be a singer." His winning piece was "The Greatest Love of All", which his father taught him at the restaurant.

In c. 1980 – c. 1982, Nievera was chosen to perform with American singer Barry Manilow at his three-day concert in Concord Pavilion, singing back-up in a choir to the latter's "One Voice". After this experience, he said, "Okay, I'm gonna be a singer." Around this time, when he was nineteen, Nievera's parents were having problems with their relationship. Nievera resented this and attempted to commit suicide. In a 2011 television interview with Boy Abunda, he recalled going to church and venting his anger on God, screaming "What the hell is happening? What else can I do?"

Inspired by his father, Nievera returned to the Philippines in 1982 to begin his own singing career. By June 1983, he released his first LP, Martin...Take One. Nievera began co-hosting the TV variety show The Penthouse Live! with Pops Fernandez, who would later become his wife. Nievera's second LP was 1984's The Best Gift. In 1987, The Penthouse Live! was changed to Martin and Pops Twogether, in celebration of their marriage. His recording Forever led to two sequels, Forever Forever and Return to Forever.

As an actor, Nievera has appeared in eleven films, and seven television series and specials. Nievera's film credits include dramas, romance, science fiction, comedy and action. He also became one of the jocks at the now defunct radio station 101.1 Kiss FM in 1985, wherein he had his own radio show aired every Saturday afternoons.

He appeared with Hawaii's Society of Seven and Lani Misalucha at the Flamingo Las Vegas from February 13 to April 13, 2008. He performed a pre-Valentine/post-birthday concert with Pops Fernandez titled "Missing You" on February 6, 2009, at the Smart Araneta Coliseum. He co-hosts the weekly music show ASAP on ABS-CBN since 1995.

In July 2010, Nievera's album, As Always was released. In May 2011, his album, Himig ng Damdamin was launched and contains all of his covers. In March 2012, he was announced as one of the four celebrity judges of The X Factor Philippines, which aired on ABS-CBN by the second quarter of 2012.

In 2018, Nievera won the Myx Magna Award at the Myx Music Awards for his contributions to music as a singer and also for being a talk show host and comedian.

In 2023, Nievera was selected to be one of the coaches (judges) on the fifth season of The Voice Kids, which aired on A2Z.

== Awards and nominations ==
Year	Award giving body	Category	Nominee / Work	Results
2008	Awit Awards	Best Performance by a Male Recording Artist (People's Choice Award)	"Hard Habit to Break"	Won
2008	Awit Awards	Best Performance by a Male Recording Artist (Performance Award)	"Hard Habit to Break"	Nominated
2008	GMMSF Box-Office Entertainment Awards	Male Concert Performer of the Year	—N/a	Won
2009	GMMSF Box-Office Entertainment Awards	Male Recording Artist of the Year	Milestone	Won
2010	GMMSF Box-Office Entertainment Awards	Male Concert Performer of the Year	—N/a	Won
2018	MYX Music Awards	MYX Magna Award	—N/a	Won
2024	Wish 107.5 Music Awards	KDR Icon of Musical Excellence	Himself	Won

== Discography ==
- Martin... Take One (1983)
- The Best Gift (1984)
- Martin (1985)
- Miracle (1987)
- A Martin Nievera Christmas (1988)
- Dream (1989)
- A New Start (1991)
- Roads (1994)
- Journeys (1997)
- Forever (1998)
- Forever, Forever (1999)
- Return to Forever (1999)
- Chasing Time (2002)
- Chasing Time II (2003)
- Unforgettable (2004)
- When Love is Gone (2005)
- Awit ng Puso (2006)
- Milestones (2007)
- Ikaw Ang Pangarap (2008)
- My Christmas List (2008)
- For Always (2009)
- As 1 (with Gary Valenciano) (2009)
- As Always (2010)
- Himig ng Damdamin (2010)
- Mga Awit at Damdamin (2012)
- 3D: Tatlong Dekada (2012)
- Big Mouth, Big Band (2014)
- Kahapon... Ngayon (2016)

== Filmography ==
=== Film ===
- Always and Forever (1986)
- Si Mister at Si Misis (1986)
- Payaso (1986)
- Shoot That Ball (1987)
- Maria Went to Town! (1987)
- Stupid Cupid (1988)
- Sa Puso Ko Hahalik ang Mundo (1988)
- Magic to Love (1989)
- Adarna: The Mythical Bird (1997)
- Alyas Boy Tigas: Ang Probinsyanong Wais (1998)
- Masikip sa Dibdib (2004)
- Wrinkles (2006)

=== Television ===
- The Penthouse Live! (1982–1987)
- Mirasol del Cielo (1986–1987)
- Martin and Pops Twogether (1987–1989)
- Martin After Dark (1988–1998)
- ASAP (1995–1998; 2002–present)
- Martin Late at Nite (1998–2003)
- Sabi Nya, Sabi Ko (television film; 2003)
- Twist and Shout (2010)
- The X Factor Philippines (2012)
- Martin Late at Night (2013)
- I Love OPM (2016)
- LSS: The Martin Nievera Show (2018–present); telecast from ANC
- The Voice Kids Philippines (2023)
- Wil To Win (2024–2025)
- It's Showtime (2024–present)
- Come Dine With Me: Celebrity Philippines (2026)
