= Donita Rose =

Filipino-American actress

Donita Rose Cavett-Palad
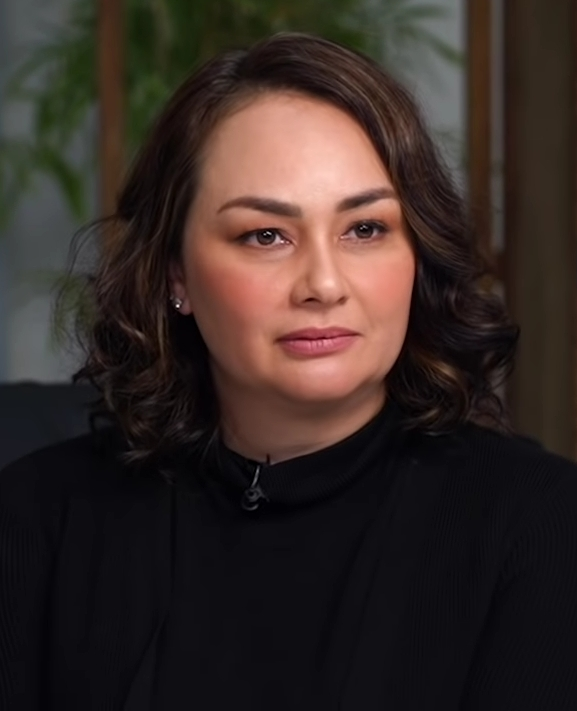
- Rose in October 2019
- Born: Donita Rose Cavett (Note: Donita Rose was born in America. Thus, she does not possess her mother's maiden name which is Ramos.); December 5, 1974 (age 51); Utah, U.S.
- Occupations: Former MTV Asia VJ; actress; TV personality
- Years active: 1990–present
- Agent: Viva Artists Agency (1992–1997)
- Spouses: Eric Villarama (m. 2003; s. 2016) Felson Palad (m. 2022)
- Children: 1

Donita Rose Cavett-Palad (born December 5, 1974) is a Filipino-American actress, TV host and former MTV Asia VJ.

== Early and personal life ==
Donita Rose Cavett was born in Utah on 5 December 1974 and moved to the Philippines when she was five years old. She is the eldest daughter to an American father, William Kent Cavett, a military officer, and a Filipino mother, Evelyn Ramos, a teacher from Pangasinan. She attended high school at Brent International School and college at De La Salle University.

In 1997, Rose moved to Singapore to pursue a career as a video jockey for MTV Asia.

In 2001, Rose met Eric Villarama after she migrated to Angeles, Pampanga. After two years, she married Villarama in Santa Barbara, California in 2003. The couple had a son named Joshua Paul, born in 2004. In the summer of 2007, they moved to Manila.

In 2015, Rose reportedly had problems in her marriage of 12 years with Eric Villarama but she maintained a positive relationship with him and decided to live together once more despite admitting the fact that she almost signed their divorce papers. The following year, however, in an interview with Mo Twister on his online podcast Good Times with Mo aired on July 12, 2016, Rose publicly confirmed her separation with Villarama after she allegedly found Instagram photos of her husband with his new partner whom he reportedly started seeing in April 2016. Although the photos were taken down by Villarama the following day, other sources were able to screen capture one of the photos of Villarama and his new partner together.

Rose is a devout born-again Christian, and an active member of Victory Fellowship Church.

On September 24, 2022, Rose married gospel recording artist Felson Palad.

On March 9, 2024, Palad admitted that it was his vow to uphold the “sanctity of the marital bond.” Rose revealed she wished her second partner to be ‘celibate’. “Yes, I was indeed a virgin when my wife and I tied the knot. While some might doubt my claim, I do not aim to prove my virginity; that would be irrelevant. I married Dee at the age of 38. I openly acknowledge that I had my share of youthful indiscretions, but one thing I upheld was the sanctity of the marital bond,” Palad explained.

== Career ==
As a teenager, Rose's acting debut began in That's Entertainment alongside co-star Gary Estrada with whom she had a relationship before moving to Singapore. Her first film was Gabo in 1989 by Regal Entertainment. In 1992, she starred in two Filipino sitcoms, Alabang Girls by Viva Entertainment and Ober Da Bakod, as well as its 1996 sequel Ober Da Bakod 2 where she played the role of Barbie Doll. In 2002, she starred with Piolo Pascual in the romantic drama film 9 Mornings as Elise Romasanta. In 2003, she starred in the Filipino comic book film adaptation of Mars Ravelo's Lastikman as Linda, the love interest of Hilario/Lastikman, played by Vic Sotto.

She formerly hosted ABS-CBN's morning news and entertainment show Umagang Kay Ganda. In May 2014, she hosted a former Filipino morning variety-talk show on GMA called Basta Every Day, Happy! which she co-hosted with Gladys Reyes, Alessandra De Rossi and Chef Boy Logro.

Rose appeared on the cover of the men's magazine FHM in its Singapore edition; she also appeared in the Malaysian, Thai and Filipino editions to which she was hailed as the "Sexiest Woman in 2001".

On April 15, 2021, Rose announced that she is a corporate chef for Island Pacific, a chain of grocery stores in the US that specialize in promoting Filipino food to anyone looking to buy them in California and Nevada.

== Filmography ==
=== Film ===
Year	Title	Role
1991	Markang Bungo: The Bobby Ortega Story	Elma
1992	Pat. Omar Abdullah: Pulis Probinsya	Korina
1992	Working Students	Helen
1992	Alabang Girls	Alex
1993	Titser... Titser... I Love You	
1993	Divine Mercy sa Buhay ni Sister Faustina	Sister Faustina Kowalska
1993	Parañaque Bank Robbery: The Joselito Jueco Story	
1993	Pusoy Dos	
1994	Ober da Bakod: The Movie	Barbie Doll
1994	Ang Pagbabalik ni Pedro Penduko	Bambi
1995	Campus Girls	Samantha
1995	The Lilian Velez Story	Pacita (Lilian Velez's newest housemaid)
1995	P're Hanggang Sa Huli	
1996	April Boys: Sana'y Mahalin Mo Rin Ako	Ingrid
1996	Cara Y Cruz: Walang Sinasanto	Belen
1996	Ober da Bakod 2: Da Treasure Adbentyur	Barbie Doll
1996	Ang Misis Kong Hoodlum	Beautiful Kiri
1997	Anak ni Boy Negro	Gemma
1998	Birador	Michelle
2002	Hesus, Rebolusyonaryo	Michelle
2002	9 Mornings	Elise
2003	Lastikman	Linda
2017	Seven Sundays	Bechay Bonifacio
2022	Labyu with an Accent	Tess
2023	Family of Two	Marissa

=== Television ===
Year	Title	Role
2007–2012	Umagang Kay Ganda	Host
2008	Iisa Pa Lamang	Rose Ramirez
2014–2015	Basta Every Day Happy	Host
2015	Let the Love Begin	Celeste Estuar-Dela Vega
2016	That's My Amboy	Cecille Carreon-Tapang
