= Ober Da Bakod =

Philippine television sitcom series

- Genre: Sitcom
- Directed by: Ariel Ureta
- Starring: Janno Gibbs; Leo Martinez; Anjo Yllana
- Country of origin: Philippines
- Original language: Tagalog

Production
- Executive producer: Lenny C. Parto
- Camera setup: Multiple-camera setup
- Running time: 42 minutes
- Production company: Viva Television

Original release
- Network: GMA Rainbow Satellite Network
- Release: September 14, 1992 – May 27, 1997

Ober Da Bakod (transl. over the fence) is a Philippine television sitcom series broadcast by GMA Network. Directed by Ariel Ureta, it stars Janno Gibbs, Leo Martinez and Anjo Yllana. It premiered on September 14, 1992. The series concluded on May 27, 1997.

== Cast and characters ==
Lead cast

- Janno Gibbs as Mokong Dayukdok
- Anjo Yllana as Bubuli Dayukdok

Supporting cast

- Donita Rose as Barbie Doll
- Gelli de Belen as Honey Grace
- Malou de Guzman as Lucresia "Lucring" Dayukdok
- Leo Martinez as Robert

Recurring cast

- Danny "Brownie" Pansalin as Brownie
- Donna Cruz as Muning
- Angelu de Leon as Kuting
- Manilyn Reynes as Manirella / Kasoy
- Amanda Page as Quickie
- Onemig Bondoc as Bubwit
- Rufa Mae Quinto as Pegassu
- Assunta de Rossi
- Dale Villar as Flip
- Randy Santiago as Mike

== Adaptations ==
The series had two film adaptations: Ober da bakod: The Movie (1994) and Ober da Bakod 2 (Da Treasure Adbentyur) (1996).
