= Chef Boy Logro: Kusina Master =

Philippine television cooking show

- Title card
- Genre: Cooking show
- Developed by: Buboy Favor
- Written by: Buboy Favor; Faith Monreal; Real Florido
- Directed by: Treb Monteras II
- Presented by: Boy Logro
- Country of origin: Philippines
- Original language: Tagalog
- No. of episodes: 618

Production
- Executive producer: Paul Lester M. Chia
- Editors: Noel Alejandro; Erwin Luis Logina
- Camera setup: Multiple-camera setup
- Running time: 15–45 minutes
- Production company: GMA Entertainment TV

Original release
- Network: GMA Network
- Release: January 2, 2012 – May 9, 2014

Chef Boy Logro Kusina Master: Sikreto ng Experto (transl. Chef Boy Logro Kitchen Master: Secret of the Expert) is a Philippine television cooking show broadcast by GMA Network. Hosted by Boy Logro, it premiered on January 2, 2012 on the network's morning line up. The show concluded on May 9, 2014, with a total of 618 episodes.

== Overview ==
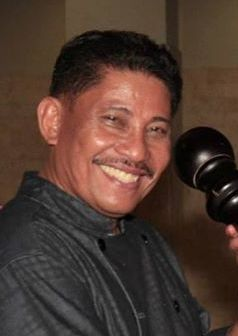
Boy Logro serves as a host.

Chef Boy Logro: Kusina Master is a 30-minute cooking show that features a step-by-step guide to cooking, kitchen skills, and food preparation. Every week, a celebrity guest co-hosts and assists Chef Boy in preparing different dishes. At the end of every episode, Chef Boy gives an assignment to viewers on what they need to buy or prepare for the next episode.

Because of the success in ratings game, Chef Boy Logro: Kusina Master extended time from 15 minutes to 30 minutes on its second season. It also added a new segment named "Master Express" where Chef Boy is challenged to make a dish as fast as five minutes. On July 9, 2012, as the show celebrated its third season and its success in ratings game, GMA Network announced the extension of its airtime, from 30 minutes to 45 minutes.

On its third season, the show presented another segment called "Turo Tours" wherein the show went around Metro Manila and some provinces with a six-wheeler mobile kitchen-studio. The said segment aims to bring the show closer to its audience by giving them a chance to witness the chef's actual cooking and taping sessions plus treat them to a free taste of every dish that the chef concocts in the show. The truck is robotically programmed to self-assemble and disassemble with the press of a button and is loaded with a working kitchen and built-in audio and lighting equipment. It also carries its own power supply, which powers its robotic stage and roof assembly. Apart from "Turo Tours", several other segments were introduced like "Market Basket Challenge", "Cook-along" and "Master Fiesta Dish".

The fourth season introduced another segment called "Kusina Master for the Day". The segment featured a chef that is known for his or her own signature dish. This dish may be a masterpiece in his personal kitchen or a specialty in an establishment. The "Kusina Master for the Day" also shares his/her success story to inspire the viewers. Another segment was introduced, "Ininit to Eat it" (transl. reheat it to eat it) wherein Chef Boy Logro prepares new recipes from left-over food.

On the sixth season, the show launched the segment called "Kusina Master's Collegiate Cooking Challenge" wherein culinary students all over the country pitted against each other in a cooking match and other challenges.

== Ratings ==
According to AGB Nielsen Philippines' Mega Manila People/Individual television ratings, the pilot episode of Chef Boy Logro: Kusina Master earned a 9.1% rating. The final episode scored a 9.1% rating in Mega Manila household television ratings.

== Accolades ==
Accolades received by Chef Boy Logro: Kusina Master
Year	Award	Category	Recipient	Result	Ref.
2012	Anak TV Seal Awards	2012 Most Well-Liked Program	Chef Boy Logro: Kusina Master	Won	
2012	Gawad Tanglaw	Best TV Cooking Show	Chef Boy Logro: Kusina Master	Won	
2012	26th PMPC Star Awards for Television	Best Educational/Children's Program	Chef Boy Logro: Kusina Master	Nominated	
2012	26th PMPC Star Awards for Television	Best Educational/Children's Program Host	Boy Logro	Nominated	
2013	NAMIC Vision Awards	Best Lifestyle Show	Chef Boy Logro: Kusina Master	Won	
2013	27th PMPC Star Awards for Television	Best Educational Program	Chef Boy Logro: Kusina Master	Nominated	
2013	US International Film and Video Festival	Certificate for Creative Excellence (Cooking category)	Chef Boy Logro: Kusina Master	Won	
2014	Golden Screen TV Awards	Outstanding Lifestyle Program	Chef Boy Logro: Kusina Master	Nominated	
2014	Golden Screen TV Awards	Outstanding Lifestyle Program Host	Boy Logro	Nominated	
2014	28th PMPC Star Awards for Television	Best Educational Program	Chef Boy Logro: Kusina Master	Nominated	
2014	28th PMPC Star Awards for Television	Best Educational Program Host	Boy Logro	Nominated	
