= Balayan =

Municipality in Batangas, Philippines

- Municipality
- Municipality of Balayan
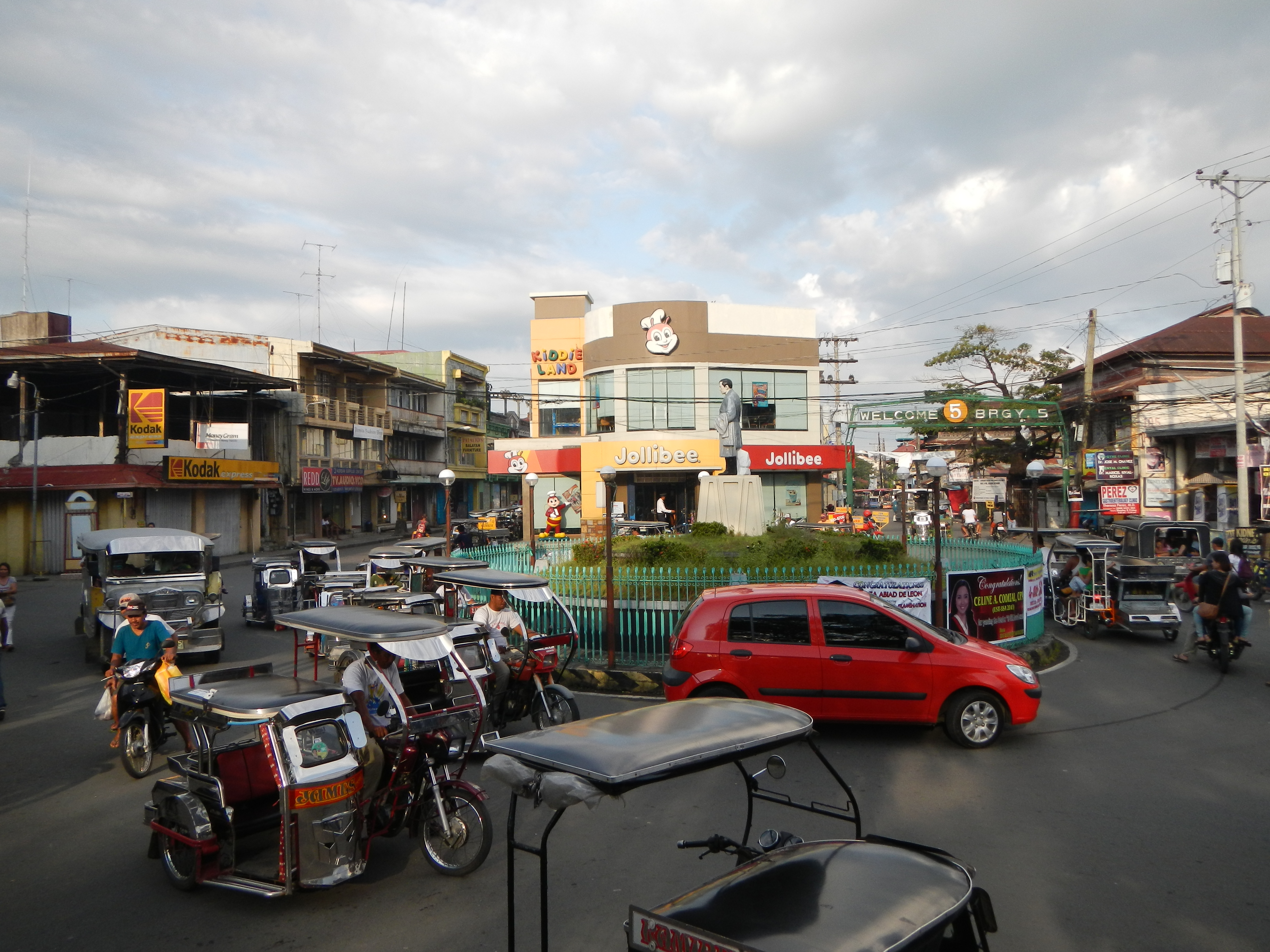
- Roundabout in Balayan

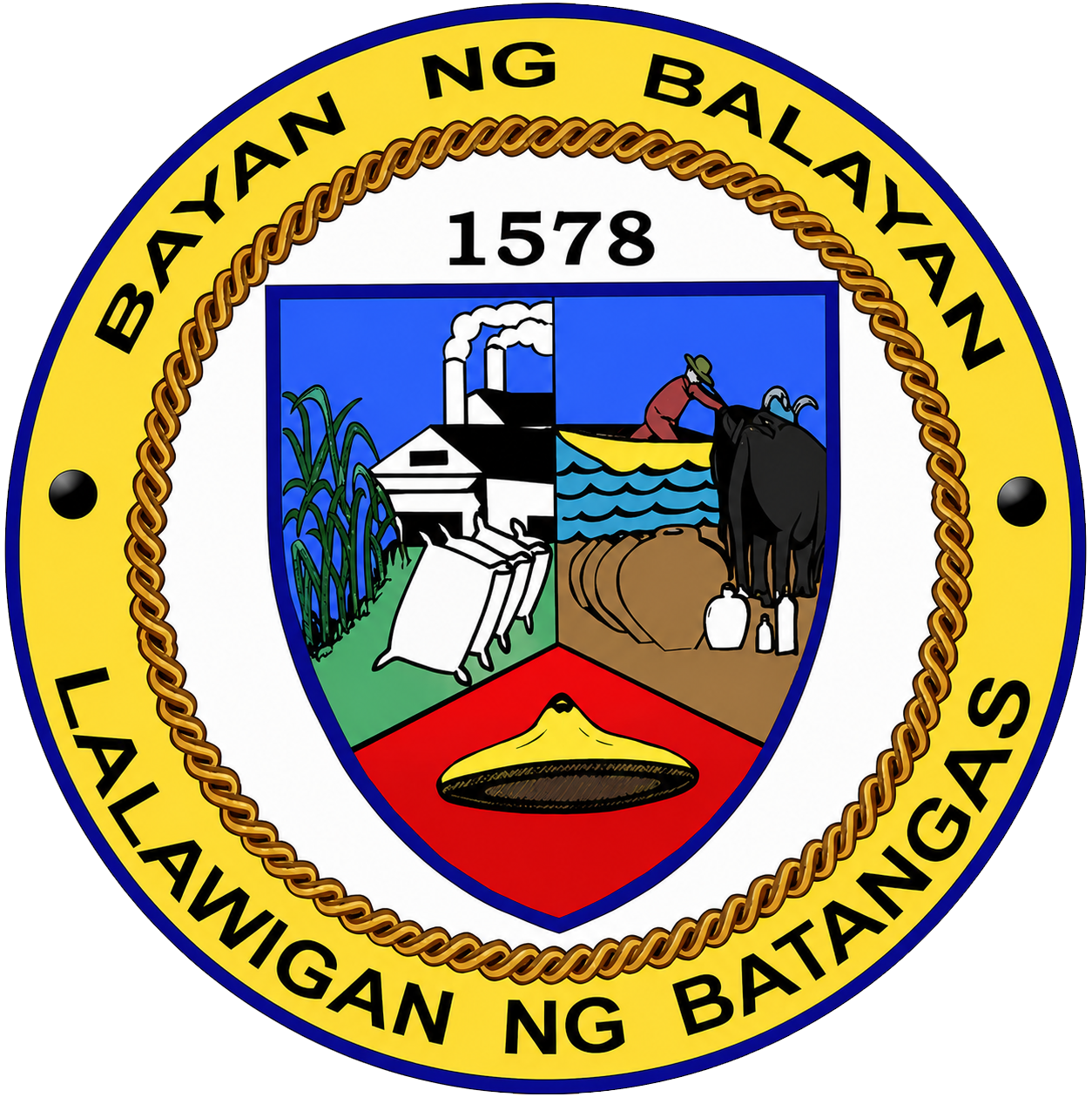
- Seal

- Map of Batangas with Balayan highlighted
- Interactive map of Balayan
- Location within the Philippines
- Coordinates: 13°56′N 120°44′E
- Country: Philippines
- Region: Calabarzon
- Province: Batangas
- District: 1st district
- Founded: December 8, 1578
- Barangays: 48 (see Barangays)

Government
  - Type: Sangguniang Bayan
  - Mayor: Elisa E. Abad
  - Vice Mayor: Efren R. Chavez
  - Representative: Leandro Antonio L. Leviste
  - Municipal Council: Members: Alfredo L. Solis III; Raymund Nonnatus I. de la Vega; Marlon P. Martinez; Mikhail Wins B. Castelo; Rodel L. Macalindong; Bernardo C. Pantoja; Romerico Roberto R. Lainez; Raquel Rodriguez Ramos-Aniwasal

Area
  - Total: 108.73 km^{2} (41.98 sq mi)
- Elevation: 33 m (108 ft)
- Highest elevation: 264 m (866 ft)
- Lowest elevation: 0 m (0 ft)

Population (2024 census)
  - Total: 96,939
  - Density: 891.56/km^{2} (2,309.1/sq mi)
  - Households: 24,391

Economy
  - Income class: 1st municipal income class
  - Poverty incidence: 10.03% (2023)
  - Revenue: ₱ 495.4 million (2024)
  - Assets: ₱ 1,801 million (2024)
  - Expenditure: ₱ 159.8 million (2024)

Service provider
  - Electricity: Batangas 1 Electric Cooperative (BATELEC 1)
- Time zone: UTC+8 (PST)
- ZIP code: 4213
- PSGC: 0401003000
- IDD : area code: +63 (0)43
- Native languages: Tagalog
- Website: www.balayan.gov.ph

Balayan, officially the Municipality of Balayan (Tagalog: Bayan ng Balayan), is a municipality in the province of Batangas, Philippines. According to the 2024 census, it has a population of 96,939 people.

== Etymology ==
Balayan is derived from the Old Tagalog word balayan, meaning "to walk past the paddy, from a basket to another" and "carry or accomplish anything with the tip of any batten". Other possible source is from the old Tagalog word balayang which means "wood".

== History ==
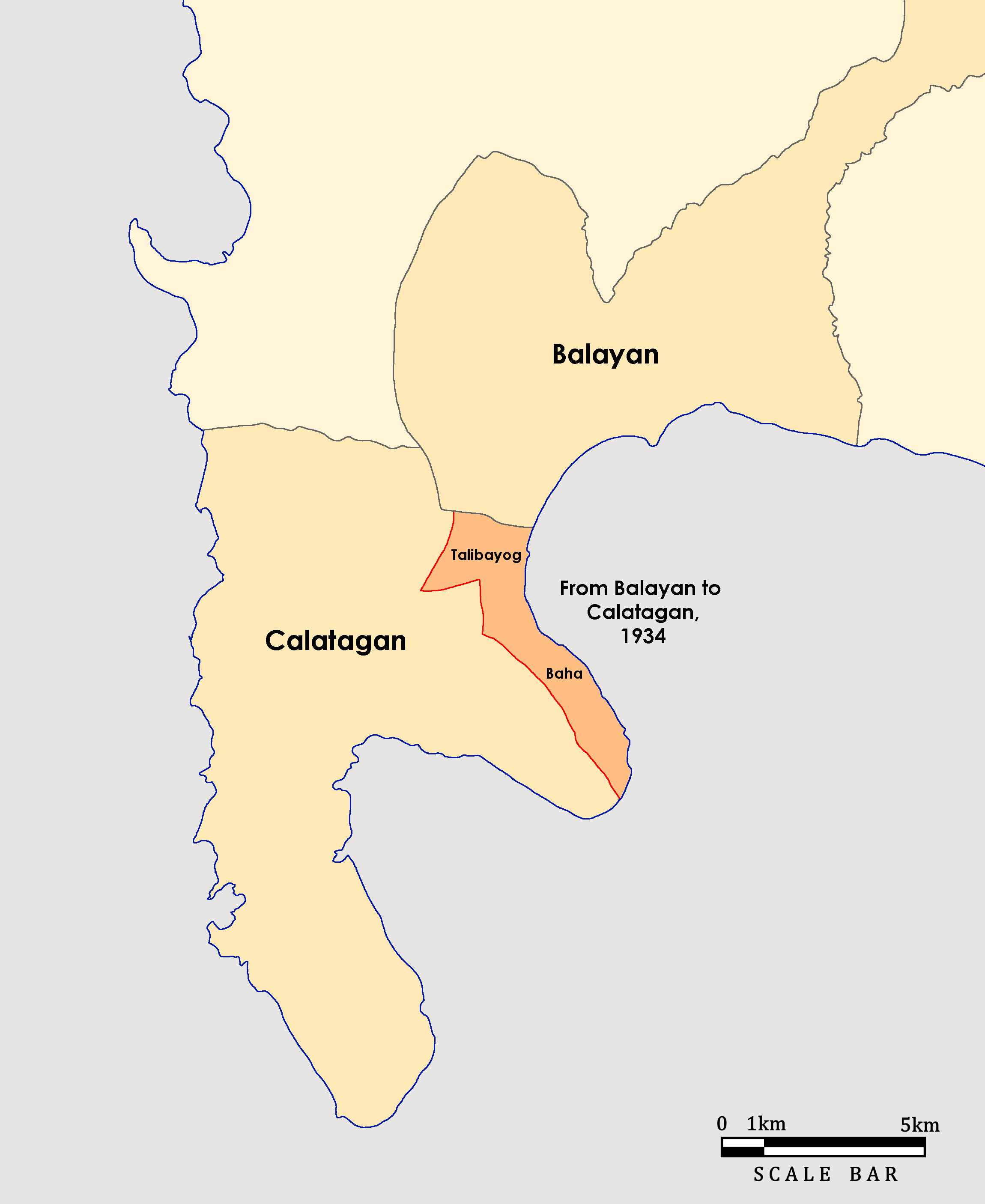
A map showing the 1934 transfer of the barangays of Talibayog and Baha from Balayan to Calatagan.

Balayan’s position on the basin of a good harbor was one of the reasons it became one of the first known settlements in the Philippines, with existing records of local indigenous residents exchanging barter goods with Chinese traders dating back to the mid-14th century.

The indigenous inhabitants of Balayan had close ties with the Kingdom of Maynila under the leadership of Rajah Sulayman and his uncle Rajah Matanda. There are historical accounts that Rajah Sulayman stayed on this area when he tried to battle the Spaniards around Intramuros.

In 1578, Balayan covered the modern-day municipality and some areas of Calaca, Calatagan, Lian, Nasugbu and Tuy. It became the capital of Balayan Province (present-day Batangas) from 1597 to 1732. It was the most progressive town of the Province and the traditional center of governance. The eruption of the Taal Volcano destroyed a significant portion of the town, moving the provincial capital to Bonbon (present-day Taal) in 1732 and the name of the province was renamed after that town.

Despite the presence of Spanish forces protected by the newly built stone fort in nearby Maynilad or Manila, Fort Santiago and Intramuros, due to its natural harbor, a number of areas around the archipelago were often become launching grounds of counterattacks from the seafaring Moro people. These events prompted local Spanish officials to set up a fort to prevent yearly Moro counterattacks.

Scholars and historians believed that Tagalog songs: Kumintang and Kundiman originated from Balayan. Spanish writer and historian Wenceslao E. Retana recorded the lyrics of a popular Kundiman when he visited Batangas in 1888.

The 1818 Spanish census recorded there to be 4,521 native families in Balayan living in harmony with 22 Spanish-Filipino families.

In 1934, the barangays of Baha and Talibayog, which were parts of Balayan at the time, were annexed to Calatagan since surveys showed that they are part of the land titled to the original owner of Hacienda Calatagan. This added a big area to the municipality.

From 3rd class municipality in 1992, Balayan jumped to 2nd class municipality in 1995, and to 1st class in July 1996, reflecting an improvement of Balayan's financial status.

== Geography ==
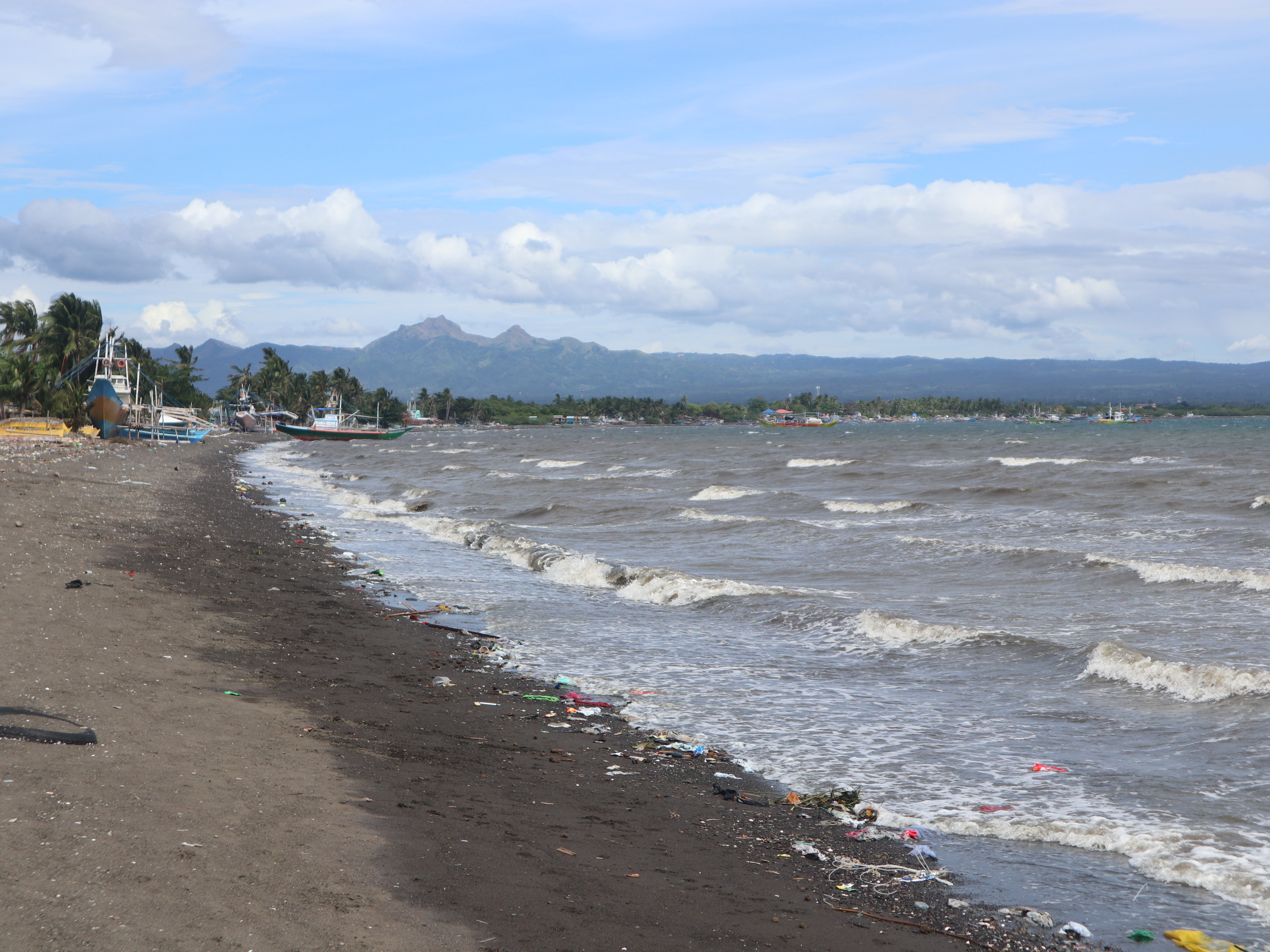
Beach along Balayan Bay with Mount Batulao in the background.

Balayan is a lowland town in western Batangas. According to the Philippine Statistics Authority, the municipality has a land area of 108.73 square kilometers (41.98 sq mi) constituting 3.49% of the 3,119.75-square-kilometer- (1,204.54 sq mi) total area of Batangas.

Balayan is bounded to the north by Tuy, to the west by Calatagan and Lian, to the east by Calaca, and to the south by Balayan Bay.

Distance from Manila, the country's capital, is 106 kilometers (66 mi) and 48 kilometers (30 mi) from Batangas City, the provincial capital.

=== Topography ===
Balayan is strategically located at the center of western Batangas. The town is bounded on the north by Tuy, north-east by Nasugbu, east by Calaca, west by Lian, south-west by Calatagan, and south by Balayan Bay.

=== Climate ===
Climate data for Balayan, Batangas
Month	Jan	Feb	Mar	Apr	May	Jun	Jul	Aug	Sep	Oct	Nov	Dec	Year
Mean daily maximum °C (°F)	29 (84)	30 (86)	31 (88)	33 (91)	32 (90)	30 (86)	29 (84)	29 (84)	29 (84)	29 (84)	29 (84)	29 (84)	30 (86)
Mean daily minimum °C (°F)	20 (68)	20 (68)	21 (70)	22 (72)	24 (75)	24 (75)	24 (75)	24 (75)	24 (75)	23 (73)	22 (72)	21 (70)	22 (72)
Average precipitation mm (inches)	11 (0.4)	13 (0.5)	14 (0.6)	32 (1.3)	101 (4.0)	142 (5.6)	208 (8.2)	187 (7.4)	175 (6.9)	131 (5.2)	68 (2.7)	39 (1.5)	1,121 (44.3)
Average rainy days	5.2	5.0	7.4	11.5	19.8	23.5	27.0	25.9	25.2	23.2	15.5	8.3	197.5
Source: Meteoblue

Balayan falls under the first type of climate: Dry season from November to April and Wet season from May to October. Balayan's Atmospheric Temperature is 28.5 to 29.8 inches (720 to 760 mm) (English Mercurial Barometer Scale). The average annual temperature in Balayan is 27.2 °C (81.0 °F). The Average Annual Rainfall is 73.39 inches (1,864 mm).

=== Barangays ===
Balayan is politically subdivided into 48 barangays, as indicated in the matrix below. Each barangay consists of puroks and some have sitios.

The largest barangay in town is Patugo while the smallest is Barangay 12.

PSGC	Barangay	Population			±% p.a.	
		2024		2010		
041003001	Baclaran	2.8%	2,674	2,220	▴	1.30%
041003003	Barangay 1 (Poblacion)	2.2%	2,100	1,938	▴	0.56%
041003004	Barangay 10 (Poblacion)	2.8%	2,697	2,845	▾	−0.37%
041003005	Barangay 11 (Poblacion)	1.5%	1,436	1,321	▴	0.58%
041003006	Barangay 12 (Poblacion)	0.3%	301	300	▴	0.02%
041003007	Barangay 2 (Poblacion)	1.5%	1,449	1,394	▴	0.27%
041003008	Barangay 3 (Poblacion)	1.5%	1,475	1,185	▴	1.53%
041003009	Barangay 4 (Poblacion)	2.1%	2,044	1,851	▴	0.69%
041003010	Barangay 5 (Poblacion)	1.9%	1,837	1,758	▴	0.31%
041003011	Barangay 6 (Poblacion)	1.2%	1,131	998	▴	0.87%
041003012	Barangay 7 (Poblacion)	0.3%	331	339	▾	−0.17%
041003013	Barangay 8 (Poblacion)	2.2%	2,107	2,130	▾	−0.08%
041003014	Barangay 9 (Poblacion)	1.8%	1,777	1,446	▴	1.44%
041003016	Calan	1.1%	1,109	964	▴	0.98%
041003017	Caloocan	6.5%	6,284	4,888	▴	1.76%
041003018	Calzada	2.1%	2,013	1,416	▴	2.48%
041003019	Canda	1.4%	1,371	1,450	▾	−0.39%
041003020	Carenahan	1.2%	1,126	1,030	▴	0.62%
041003021	Caybunga	0.9%	891	841	▴	0.40%
041003022	Cayponce	1.5%	1,459	1,388	▴	0.35%
041003023	Dalig	3.2%	3,114	3,008	▴	0.24%
041003024	Dao	1.9%	1,830	1,445	▴	1.66%
041003025	Dilao	1.4%	1,370	1,442	▾	−0.36%
041003026	Duhatan	1.7%	1,679	1,518	▴	0.70%
041003027	Durungao	1.1%	1,035	937	▴	0.69%
041003028	Gimalas	2.2%	2,151	1,549	▴	2.31%
041003029	Gumamela	3.1%	3,051	2,595	▴	1.13%
041003030	Lagnas	1.0%	1,004	929	▴	0.54%
041003031	Lanatan	2.6%	2,538	2,715	▾	−0.47%
041003032	Langgangan	1.3%	1,213	1,194	▴	0.11%
041003033	Lucban Putol	1.9%	1,889	1,383	▴	2.19%
041003034	Lucban Pook	1.9%	1,878	1,551	▴	1.34%
041003035	Magabe	2.0%	1,942	1,779	▴	0.61%
041003036	Malalay	1.1%	1,024	1,063	▾	−0.26%
041003037	Munting Tubig	1.8%	1,790	1,534	▴	1.08%
041003038	Navotas	4.2%	4,113	3,451	▴	1.23%
041003039	Patugo	2.5%	2,386	1,885	▴	1.65%
041003040	Palikpikan	2.0%	1,927	1,150	▴	3.66%
041003042	Pooc	2.6%	2,544	2,267	▴	0.81%
041003043	Sambat	3.2%	3,078	2,345	▴	1.91%
041003044	Sampaga	3.2%	3,122	2,386	▴	1.89%
041003045	San Juan	2.0%	1,960	1,738	▴	0.84%
041003046	San Piro	3.9%	3,783	3,377	▴	0.79%
041003048	Santol	4.3%	4,144	2,385	▴	3.92%
041003049	Sukol	0.9%	886	837	▴	0.40%
041003050	Tactac	1.1%	1,049	932	▴	0.83%
041003051	Taludtud	2.3%	2,224	1,165	▴	4.60%
041003052	Tanggoy	1.6%	1,577	1,543	▴	0.15%
	Total		96,939	81,805	▴	1.19%

== Demographics ==
Population census of Balayan
Year	Pop.	±% p.a.
1903	8,493	—
1918	13,141	+2.95%
1939	15,224	+0.70%
1948	18,305	+2.07%
1960	23,745	+2.19%
1970	33,198	+3.40%
1975	38,214	+2.86%
1980	43,486	+2.62%
1990	53,870	+2.16%
1995	62,244	+2.74%
2000	67,170	+1.65%
2007	79,407	+2.34%
2010	81,805	+1.09%
2015	90,699	+1.99%
2020	95,913	+1.18%
2024	96,939	+0.26%
Source: Philippine Statistics Authority

In the 2024 census, Balayan had a population of 96,939 people. The population density was 890 inhabitants per square kilometre (2,300/sq mi).

The main language used by the people in Balayan is Tagalog. Literate people can speak English but it is often used in formal occasions or events only.

=== Religion ===
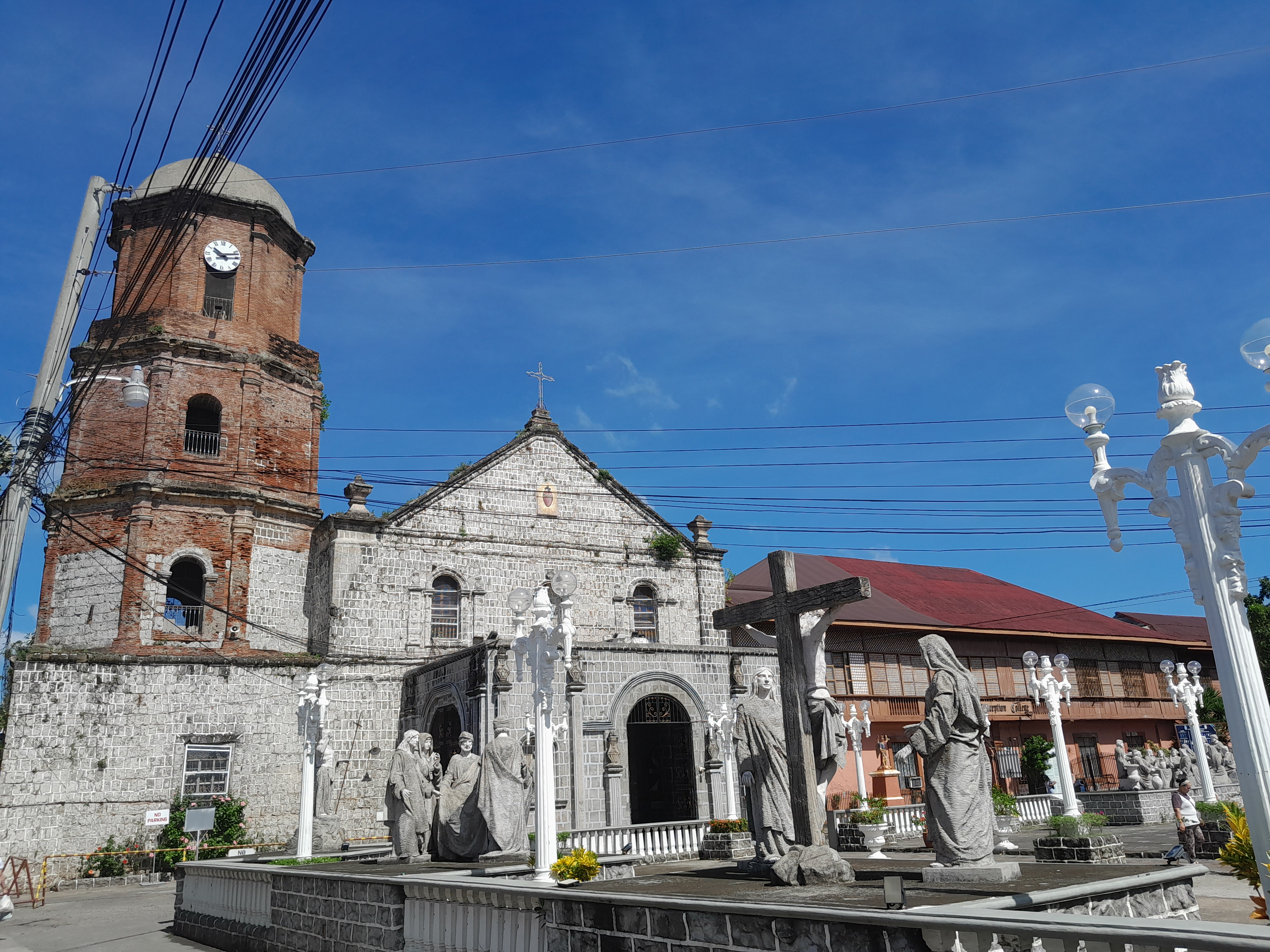
Balayan Church

Churches:

- Immaculate Conception Parish Church (Balayan)
- Ermita Church
- Jesus the Peace Maker Christian Church
- Jesus Is Lord Church

== Economy ==
Poverty incidence of Balayan

Source: Philippine Statistics Authority

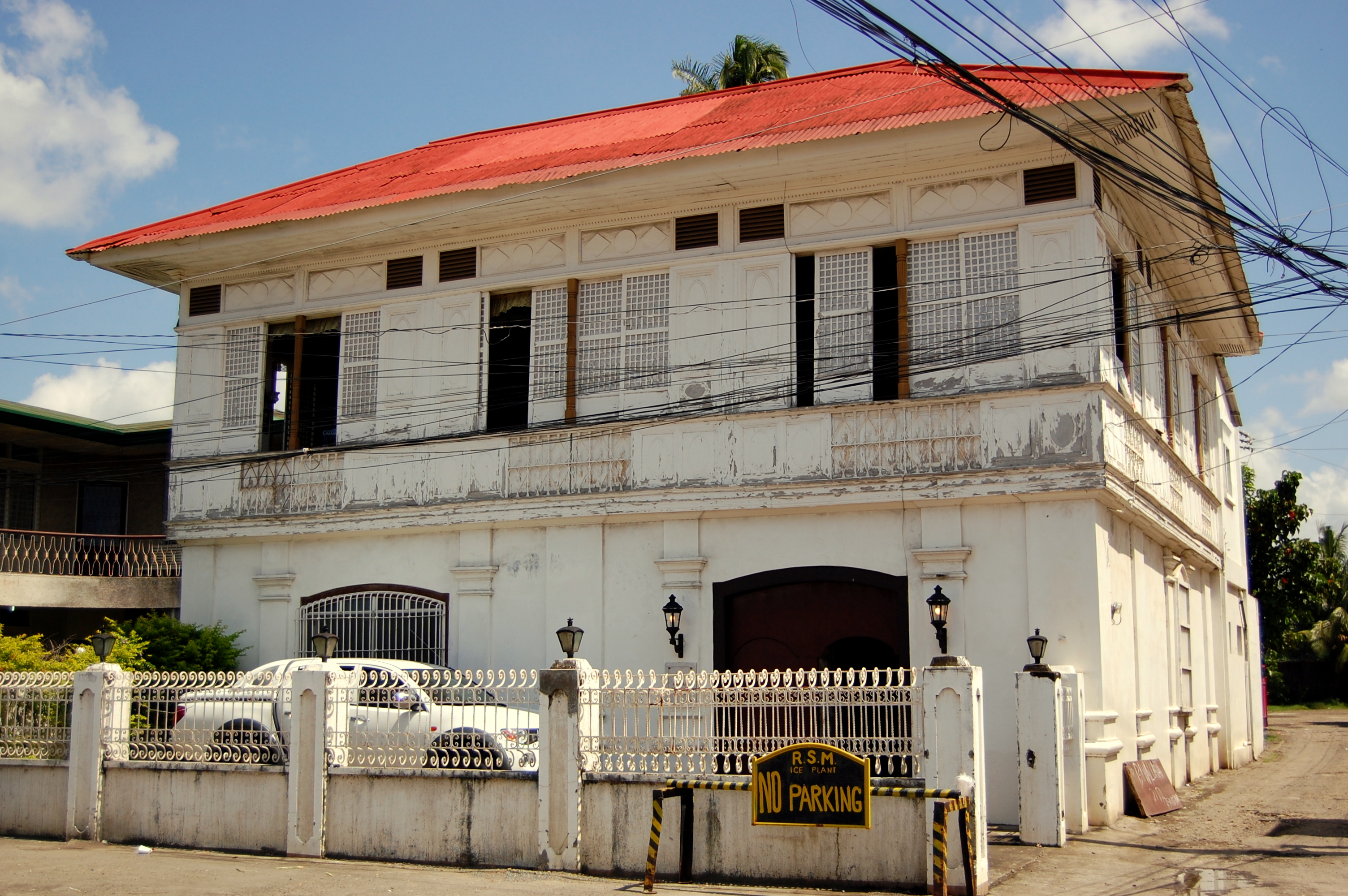
Casa Cacao

The town is rich among the natural resources of sugarcanes, coconuts and corn. Significant events includes the Parada ng Lechon, celebrated on every June 24. Widely known products originating from the area include the Bagoong Balayan.

- Phil Steel Corporation (Steelcorp) – manufacturer of coated steel sheets, coils and irons
- Batangas Sugar Cane Central – the mother company of Muscuvado Food Sugar Corp. and processes sugar cane
- ProGreen Distillery (Emperador)
- Walter Mart Balayan
- Me & City Shoppers Mall Balayan

== Government ==
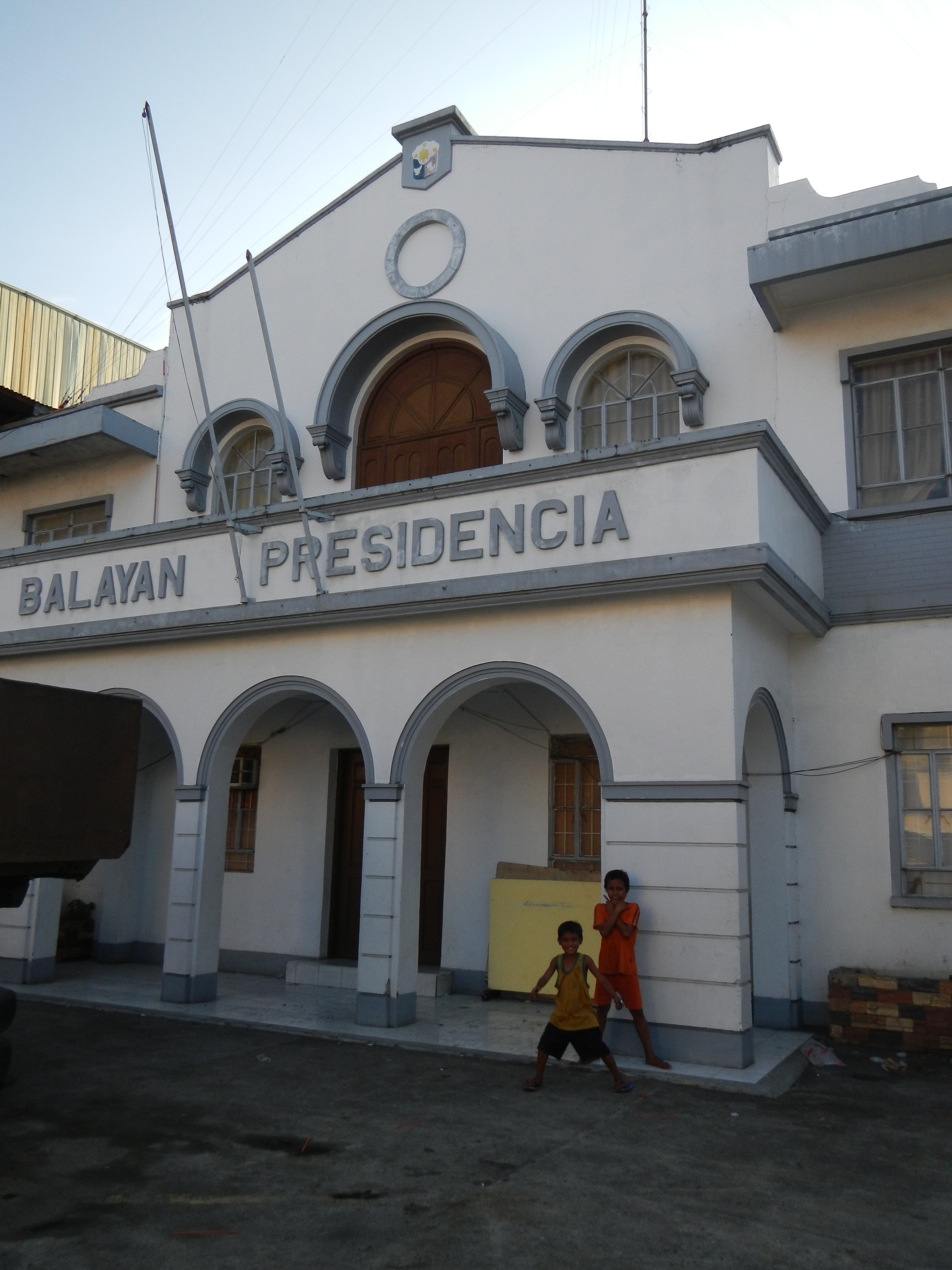
Balayan Government Center

=== Elected officials ===
- Mayor – Elisa "Lisa" Ermita-Abad
- Vice Mayor – Atty. Efren R. Chavez
- Councilors:
- Alfredo L. Solis III
- Raymund Nonnatus I. de la Vega
- Marlon P. Martinez
- Mikhail Wins B. Castelo
- Rodel L. Macalindong
- Bernardo C. Pantoja
- Romerico Roberto R. Lainez
- Raquel Rodriguez Ramos-Aniwasal

== Tourism ==
In January 2009, Balayan renovated a mini park called Balayan BayWalk Park which provides locals and tourists a view of Balayan Bay similar to what is seen in Manila.

Immaculate Conception Parish Church, commonly known as Balayan Church, is a Roman Catholic parish church in the Balayan, under the jurisdiction of the Archdiocese of Lipa. The church is listed as a National Cultural Treasure as its construction was supervised by Filipino Seculars during the Spanish Colonial Period.

== Healthcare ==
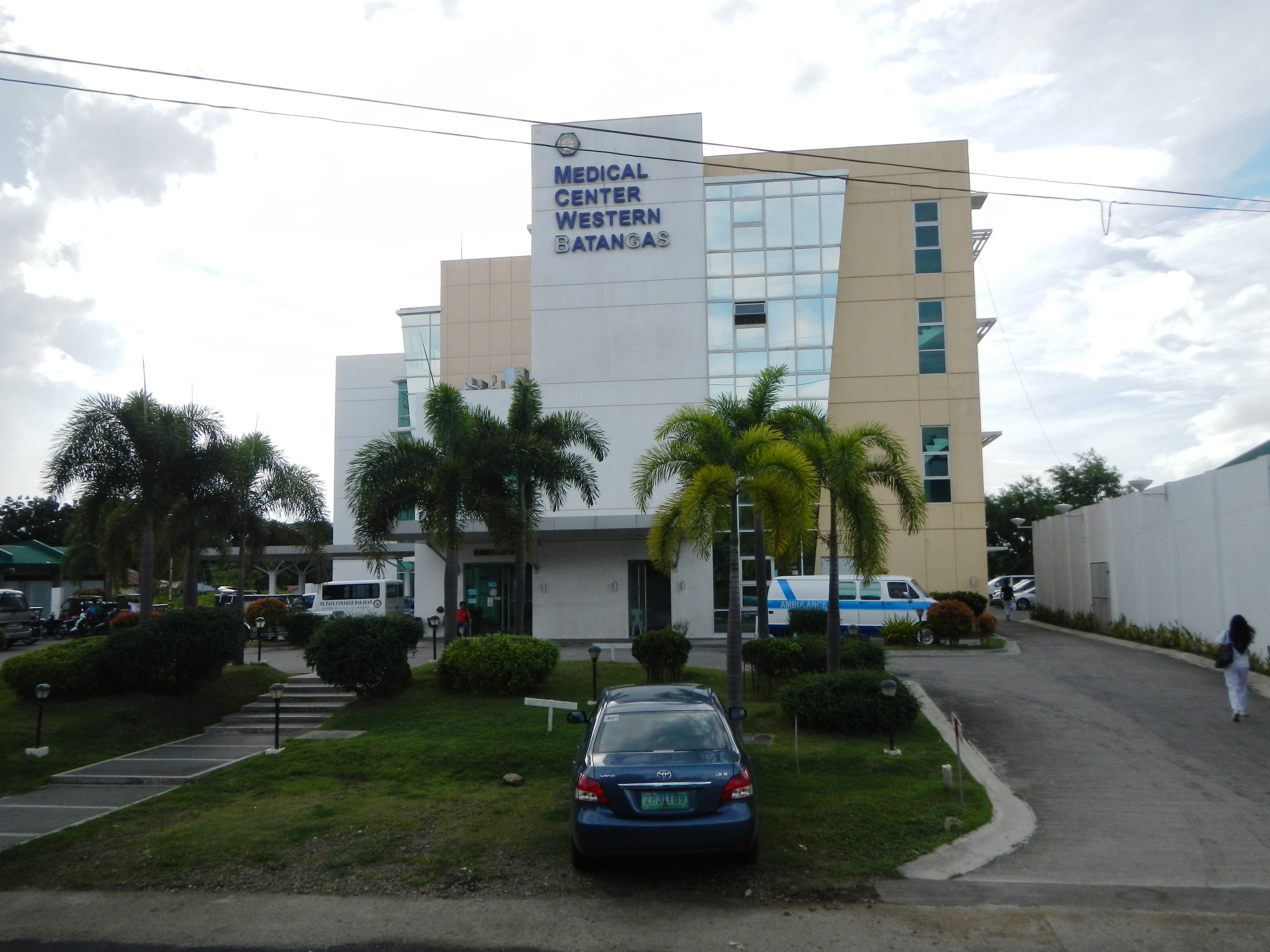
Medical Center Western Batangas

Hospitals in Balayan include:

- Medical Center Western Batangas
- Balayan Bayview Hospital and Medical Center
- Don Manuel Lopez Memorial District Hospital
- Metro Balayan Medical Center

== Education ==
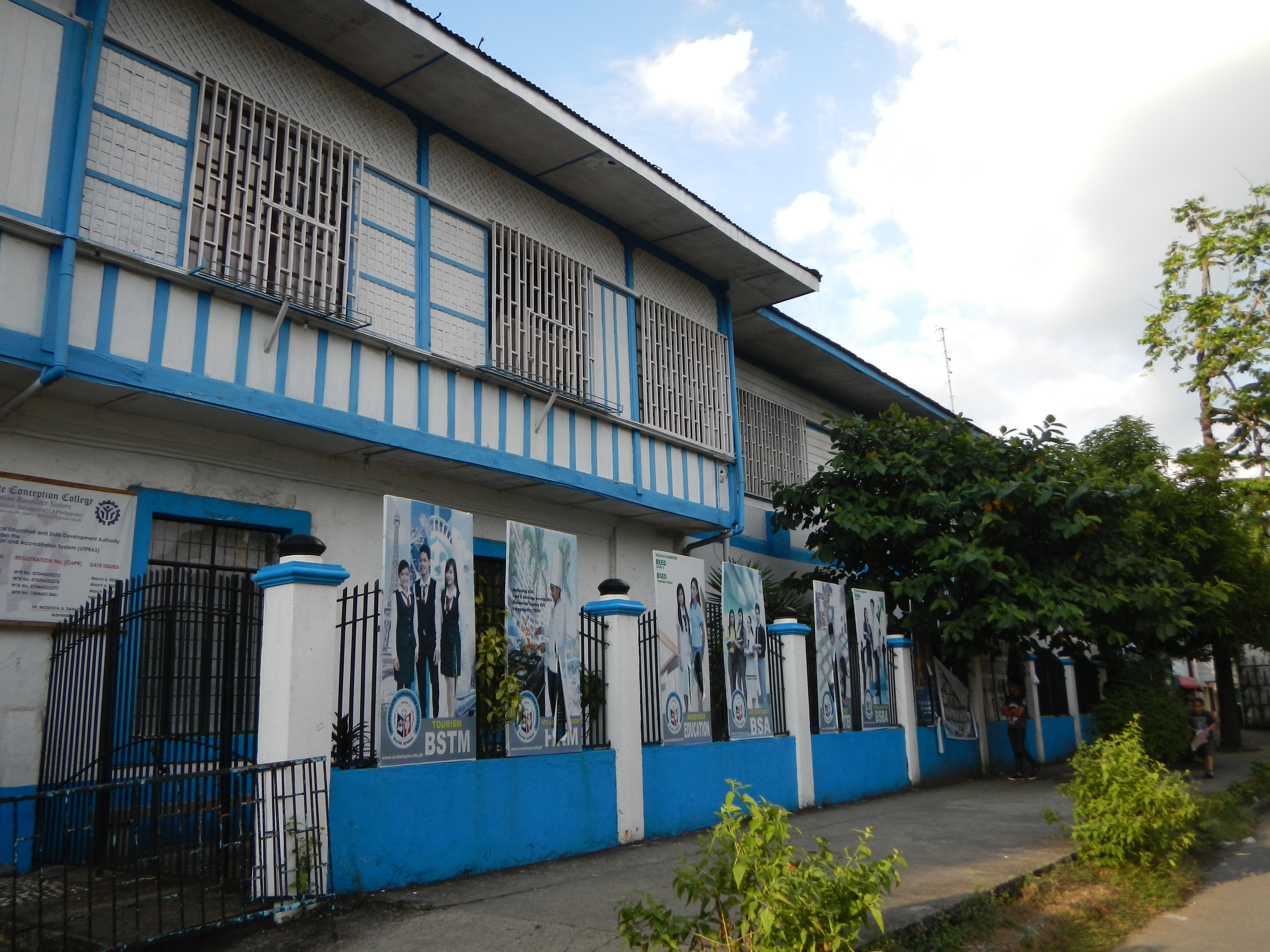
Immaculate Conception College

There are two schools district offices which govern all educational institutions within the municipality. They oversee the management and operations of all private and public, from primary to secondary schools. These are Balayan East Schools District Office, and Balayan West Schools District Office.

Balayan has several schools, institutions and university both public and private located within and outside the Poblacion.

=== Primary and elementary schools ===
- Agustin T. Ramos Memorial Elementary Schoo
- Baclaran Elementary School
- Balayan East Central School
- Balayan Kiddie Learning Center
- Balayan West Central School
- Blessed Christ Child Montessori Foundation
- Calan Elementary School
- Caloocan Elementary School
- Canda Elementary School
- Cepriana Ascue Memorial Elementary School
- Core Science Academy
- Dao Elementary School
- Dilao Elementary School
- Don Leon Martinez Memorial Elementary School
- Doña Asuncion Martinez Memorial Elementary School
- Dr. Jose A. Alaras Elementary School
- Flaviano-Pelagia Pantoja Memorial Elementary School
- Jose Chua Ben Chong Memorial Elementary School
- Jose T. Unson Memorial Elementary School
- Juan C. De Lunas Memorial Elementary School
- Lanatan-Muntingtubig Elementary School
- Lucban Elementary School
- Lyceum of Southern Luzon
- Maranatha Christian Academy
- Navotas Elementary School
- Patugo Elementary School
- Pook Elementary School
- Putol Elementary School
- Sampaga Elementary School
- San Piro National High School
- Santol Elementary School
- Schola Nazaria
- St. Paul Foundational Learning and Excellence Centre
- Sucol Elementary School
- Troadio A. Frontera Memorial Elementary School

=== Secondary schools ===
- Balayan Adventist Elementary School
- Balayan National High School
- Balayan Senior High School
- Lucban National High School

=== Higher educational institutions ===
- Balayan Colleges
- Immaculate Concepcion College
- Saint Paul College Balayan
- STI College - Balayan

== Notable personalities ==
- Sixto López – propagandist and negotiator for Philippine independence from the United States
- Clemencia López – Filipina independence activist, Sister of Sixto López
- Leo Martinez – actor, comedian, and director
- Kim de Leon – actor
- Galicano Apacible – physician, politician, companion of José Rizal and co-founder of La Solidaridad and the Nacionalista Party.
- Eduardo Ermita – Politician and military officer, former deputy chief of staff of the Armed Forces of the Philippines and executive secretary of the Philippines
