= Ober da Bakod 2 (Da Treasure Adbentyur) =

- Directed by: Ariel Ureta
- Written by: Henry Lopez
- Produced by: Bobby Barreiro; Eric Cuatico
- Starring: Janno Gibbs; Anjo Yllana; Leo Martinez; Manilyn Reynes; Donita Rose; Gelli de Belen; Malou de Guzman
- Cinematography: Johnny Araojo
- Edited by: Renato de Leon
- Music by: Ricky del Rosario
- Production company: Cinemax Studios
- Distributed by: Neo Films
- Release date: January 25, 1996
- Running time: 110 minutes
- Country: Philippines
- Language: Filipino

Ober da Bakod 2 (Da Treasure Adbentyur) is a 1996 Philippine comedy-adventure film directed by Ariel Ureta. The film stars Janno Gibbs, Anjo Yllana, Leo Martinez, Manilyn Reynes, Donita Rose, Gelli de Belen and Malou de Guzman. It is a sequel to the 1994 movie of the same title.

== Plot ==
Mokong carries out a prank on his rich, snobbish neighbor Don Robert which backfires, landing them both in hospital. While confined, the two receive a map from a dying patient containing clues towards a cure-all medicine that could make them rich. They convince their respective families to accompany them in finding it and go separately to a run-down laboratory run by mad scientist Hannibal, who captures them except for Mokong and his sister Kuting and electrocutes them into insanity. Mokong and Kuting later restore their minds by electrocuting them again and defeat Hannibal before rescuing Dr. No, a scientist who leads them to the next clue, located in a bank.

The group arrives at the bank, only to find the place under siege due to an ongoing robbery with Don Robert's daughter and Mokong’s girlfriend Kasoy, who chose to stay behind, held hostage as she was undertaking a routine transaction. When the robbers demand food and decorations to celebrate the birthday of one of their colleagues, Mokong and Don Robert pose as delivery men carrying the items. They then cause a series of mishaps that lead to the arrest of the robbers. Afterwards, the grateful bank managers give them their next clue, which leads their group to the mansion of a Beast.

The Beast, who is openly hostile towards his guests, eventually falls in love with Don Robert’s other daughter Barbie. As they share a dance, the Beast is transformed back into human form by Barbie's love, but is stabbed and mortally wounded by his servant out of jealousy after being prodded by Hannibal, who had followed them. Upon the Beast’s death, the mansion collapses, but not before he reveals that the next clue is in the Moon.

Escaping from the mansion and arriving in the Moon through a portal, the group meet an all-female tribe who give them gravity pills to counteract weightlessness. Their leader explains that the medicine they are searching for is located in a giant, animated flower. However, the tribe are decimated by carnivorous aliens while Don Robert is mauled by the flower after he gets too much of its stamen. Mokong, Don Robert and their families are then rescued by relatives on a spaceship and return to Earth.

As Mokong ang Kasoy flirt on an open-air hatch mid-flight, Hannibal reappears, but Mokong feeds him a gravity pill, sending him crashing down to the Moon. Afterwards, Don Robert interrupts them, but is ejected into space by Mokong when he tries to stop his romance with Kasoy. While floating in space, Don Robert is arrested by police.

== Cast ==
- Janno Gibbs as Mokong
- Anjo Yllana as Bubuli
- Leo Martinez as Don Robert
- Manilyn Reynes as Kasoy
- Donita Rose as Barbie Doll
- Angelu de Leon as Kuting
- Malou de Guzman as Lucring
- Arnel Ignacio as Desi
- Gary Estrada as Beast
- Amanda Page as Moonwoman leader
- Ruel Vernal as Hannibal
- Errol Dionisio as Utu
- Jon Achaval as Dr. No
- Raffy Rodriguez as Kargador
- Nikka Cruz as Ay-Ay
- Christopher de Venecia as Dagul
- Jayboy Samson as Richard
- Chi Fier as Chi
- Jose Balagtas as bank robber leader
- Bangkay as patient

== Production ==
The film was supposed to be part of the 1995 Metro Manila Film Festival, but was not able to make it to the cut-off. Its playdate was set to late January 1996.
