= Leo Martinez =

Filipino actor

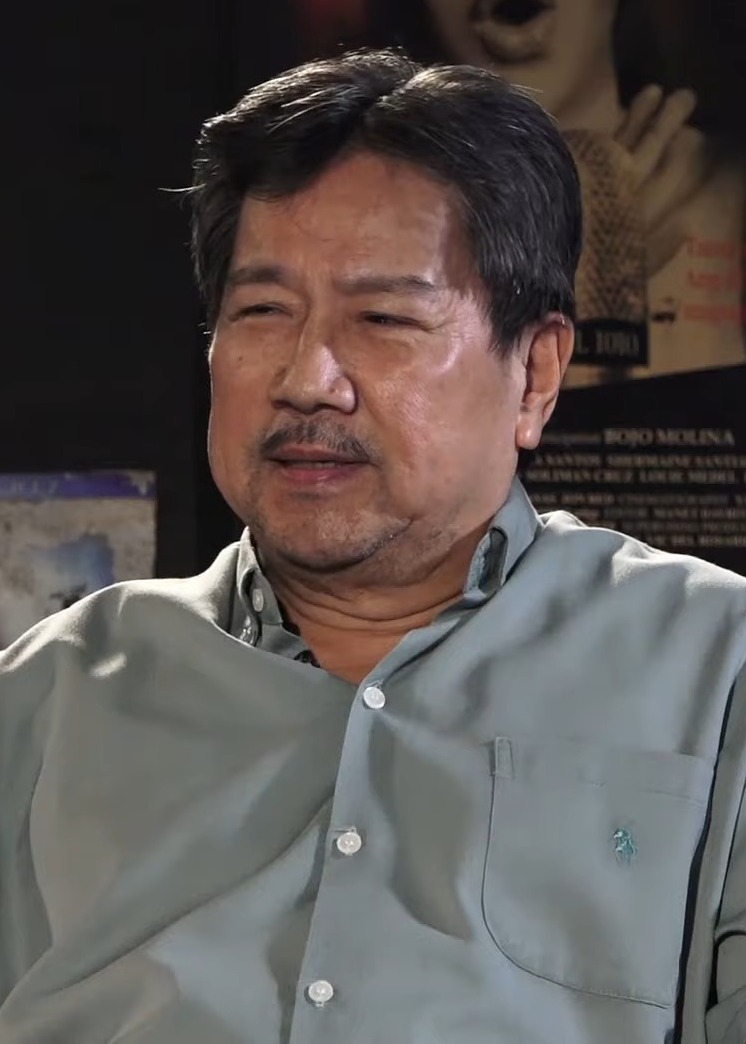
- Martinez in 2018
- Born: March 7, 1945 (age 81); Balayan, Batangas, Philippines
- Other name: Leo Martin
- Occupations: Actor, comedian
- Years active: 1970–present
- Known for: Congressman Manhik Manaog
- Spouse: Gina Valenciano
- Children: 6
- Relatives: Gary Valenciano (brother-in-law)

Leo Martinez (born March 7, 1945) is a Filipino actor, comedian and director. Martinez also served as Director General of the Film Academy of the Philippines.

== Personal life ==
He is married to Gina Valenciano (sister of Gary Valenciano), and has child named Lesley Elvira Valenciano Martinez. He also has another child, Jeremiah David (Jay), from a previous relationship with actress Cherie Gil.

== Filmography ==
=== Film ===
Year	Title	Role
1970	Three Men and a Lola	-
1970	The Secret of the Sacred Forest	Bayarti
1973	Impossible Dream	-
1973	Fly Me	Tourist Guide
1974	Bamboo Gods and Iron Men	-
1974	TNT Jackson (or Dynamite Wong and TNT Jackson)	-
1976	She Devils in Chains (released as Ebony, Ivory, and Jade)	-
1976	Minsa'y Isang Gamu-gamo	Travel Agent
1978	Vampire Hookers	Julio
1978	Death Force	-
1980	Kakabakaba Ka Ba?	Fr. Blanco
1981	Enter the Ninja	Pee Wee
1983	Cage Fury	Doctor
1983	Init sa Magdamag	Mr. Perez (uncredited)
1984	Bagets 2	Erpat
1985	Virgin Forest	Hepe Sales/San Mateo
1985	Ben Tumbling	-
1986	Unfaithful Wife	Mayor
1986	Silk	Yamamoto Tanaka
1987	Sweet Revenge	Buddha
1988	Saigon Commandos	Prosecutor
1989	Primary Target	General Swai
1989	Eye of the Eagle 2: Inside the Enemy	Dr. Popoy
1989	Last Stand at Lang Mei	Tovar
1991	Juan Tamad at Mister Shooli: Mongolian Barbecue	Manhik-Manaog
1992	Si Lucio at Si Miguel: Hihintayin Ko Kayo sa Langit	-
1992	Sam & Miguel (Your Basura, No Problema)	Joe Prit
1992	Aswang	Dr. Abraham
1992	Jerry Marasigan, WPD	
1992	Alyas Pogi 2	Teng-Teng
1992	Unang Tibok ng Puso	-
1992	Buddy en Sol	Passenger (Uncredited, also director)
1993	Dugo ng Panday	Agno
1993	Astig	-
1993	Kailangan Kita	Chief Lima
1993	Gagay: Prinsesa ng Brownout	Don Leon
1993	Row 4: Baliktorians	Felix
1994	Pusoy Dos	Steve
1994	Ang Pagbabalik ni Pedro Penduko	Losipero
1994	Kalabog en Bosyo	Chief Barcelon
1994	Swindler's List	-
1994	Pinagbiyak Na Bunga: Lookalayk	Tiburcio
1994	Ober Da Bakod: The Movie	Don Robert
1995	Batangueño Kabitenyo	Magno
1995	Epifanio Ang Bilas Ko: NB-Eye	Epifanio
1995	Indecent Professor	Prof. Aristotle Morpheus
1996	Ober Da Bakod 2 (Da Treasure Adbentyur)	Don Robert
1996	A.E.I.O.U.	Juan
1996	SPO1 Don Juan: Da Dancing Policeman	SPO1 Don Juan
1997	Trabaho Lang Dear, Walang Personalan	Romeo
1997	Matinik na Bading, Mga Syuking Buking	Boyong/Vicky
1997	Pipti-pipti: 1 por U, 2 por Me	Popoy
1998	Muling Ibalik ang Tamis ng Pag-ibig	Lass
1998	Dr. X on the Air	Dr. X
1998	Ala eh...Con Bisoy Hale-Hale Hoy! Laging Manalo ang Mga Unggoy	Bill
1999	Weder-Weder Lang 'Yan	Don Emilio
2000	Mana-Mana, Tiba-Tiba	Don Segundo
2001	Torotot	Pido
2003	Fantastic Man	David
2007	M.O.N.A.Y (Misteyks Obda Neyson Adres Yata) ni Mr. Shooli	Congressman Manhik Manaog
2008	Barako	-
2008	Baler	Col. Calixto Villacorte
2009	Sabungero	Congressman
2009	Love on Line (LOL)	Don Pedro Polistico
2009	Yaya and Angelina: The Spoiled Brat Movie	Principal Tiongco/Prince Epal
2009	Nobody, Nobody But... Juan	Taxi Driver
2009	Wapakman	Dr. Turibio Jingle
2010	MKAK	-
2011	Law Law Gang	-
2012	Yakman: D' Gigil King	
2013	Tuhog	Tonio Sucat
2013	On the Job	General Pacheco
2013	Pagpag: Siyam na Buhay	-
2014	Gangster Lolo	Asiong Salonpas
2014	Tres	Tata Selo
2015	Heneral Luna	Pedro Paterno
2015	Manila's Finest	Gen. Dela Paz
2016	Working Beks	Mr.Ted
2017	Ang Larawan	Voice of older Bitoy Camacho
2018	Goyo: Ang Batang Heneral	Pedro Paterno
2019	Ulan	Maya's employer
2020	Suarez: The Healing Priest	Bishop
2020	Pakboys Takusa	Bernardo
2021	Jesus Christ...Virgin People!	Tey's Grandfather (Mother Side)
2021	Mang Jose	Marcelo
2021	On the Job: The Missing 8	Gen. Pacheco

=== Television ===
Year	Title	Role	Notes
1990	Mongolian Barbecue	Guest	
1992–1997	Ober Da Bakod	Don Robert	
1997–1998	Onli in Da Pilipins	Kapitan Sixto Pumaran	
1999–2004	Ispup	Various	
1999–2020	Maynila	Various	
2000	What Went Wrong	Host	
2000	Wansapanataym		Episode: "Lazy Johnny Meets Juan Tamad"
2000–2001	GMA Telesine Specials	Various	
2001	Idol Ko si Kap	Attorney	
2005	Sugo	Fr. Francis	
2005	HP: To the Highest Level Na!	Boss Hugo	
2006	Love to Love	Lolo Jose	Episode: "Young at Heart"
2006	Hokus Pokus	Boss Hugo	
2006	Na-Scam Ka Na Ba?		
2007	Mga Kuwento ni Lola Basyang	Ahab	Episode: "Ang Mahiwagang Biyulin"
2007	Marimar	Lolo Pancho Perez	
2008	Sine Novela: Kaputol ng Isang Awit	Lolo Ige Monteza	
2008	Carlo J. Caparas' Gagambino	Zandro	
2009	Zorro	Carlos Pulido	
2009	Talentadong Pinoy	Guest Celebrity Judge	
2010	Tanging Yaman	Vice President Solomon Buenavista	
2010	5 Star Specials	Various	
2010	Untold Stories Mula sa Face to Face	Various	
2011	Sisid	Ramon de la Vida	
2011	Follow That Star	Himself / Guest	
2012	Toda Max	Lolo Lloydie	
2012	Artista Academy	Guest Celebrity Judge	
2012	Coffee Prince	Ernie Muling Tapang	
2013–2016	Magpakailanman	Various	3 episodes
2013	Kakambal ni Eliana	Don Eddie Cascavel	
2015	Masayang Umaga Po!	Host	
2015	Nathaniel	Tagasundo / Abel "Ramon Roman" Tumana	
2015	Magpakailanman	Ramon	
2016	Naku, Boss Ko!	Onofre Mesa Ganid / O.M.G.	
2016	Ismol Family		
2016	Karelasyon	Tasoy	
2016	Alamat	Sampo	Episode: "Alamat ng Sampaloc"
2016	A1 Ko Sa 'Yo	Congressman	
2017	Showtime Holy Week Special	Armand	
2018	Sana Dalawa ang Puso	Mr. Supapi	
2018	Sunday PinaSaya	Guest	
2019	Daddy's Gurl	Pureza's Father	
2019	Maalaala Mo Kaya	August Tesoro	Episode: "Steak"
2019	Dragon Lady	Wilson Lim	
2019	FPJ's Ang Probinsyano	Kapitan Bartolome "Bart" Bulaan	
2021	Owe My Love	Salvador "Badong" Alcancia	
2022	Love in 40 Days	Patricio Guzman	
2023–2024	Abot-Kamay na Pangarap	Joselito ''Pepe'' Tanyag	Recurring role
2023–2024	Senior High	Mariano	Recurring role
2024	Walang Matigas na Pulis sa Matinik na Misis	Adonis Reynaldo	
2025	Lolong: Bayani ng Bayan	Kanor	
2025	FPJ's Batang Quiapo	Mr. Arthur Kwon	

== Awards and nominations ==
Year	Award	Category	Nominated work	Result
1991	Metro Manila Film Festival	Best Supporting Actor	Juan Tamad at Mister Shooli: Mongolian Barbecue	Won
1992	Gawad Urian Awards	Best Supporting Actor	Juan Tamad at Mister Shooli: Mongolian Barbecue	Nominated
1992	FAMAS Awards	Best Supporting Actor	Juan Tamad at Mister Shooli: Mongolian Barbecue	Nominated
