= Epifanio ang Bilas Ko: NB-Eye =

Philippine action comedy film

Epifanio Ang Bilas Ko: NB-Eye
- Official movie poster
- Directed by: Jett Espiritu
- Screenplay by: Henry Nadong
- Story by: Jett Espiritu
- Produced by: Jesse Ejercito
- Starring: Leo Martinez; Dennis Padilla
- Cinematography: Arnold Alvaro
- Edited by: Ever Ramos
- Music by: Tony Cortez
- Production companies: Viva Films; Merdeka Film Productions
- Distributed by: Viva Films
- Release date: May 4, 1995
- Running time: 110 minutes
- Country: Philippines
- Language: Filipino

Epifanio Ang Bilas Ko: NB-Eye is a 1995 Philippine action comedy film written and directed by Jett Espiritu. The film stars Leo Martinez and Dennis Padilla. It is a parody of the 1994 film Epimaco Velasco NBI.

== Plot ==
Epifanio (Leo) and Panfilo (Dennis) run a private eye agency owned by their father-in-law (Rudy).

== Cast ==
Main cast

- Leo Martinez as Epifanio
- Dennis Padilla as Panfilo
- Jean Garcia as Emma
- Jackie Aquino as Lily

Supporting cast

- Romy Diaz as Ben
- Emily Loren
- Maita Sanchez
- Rudy Meyer as Father
- Dexter Doria as Madonna
- Romy Romulo
