= Idol sa Kusina =

Philippine television show

- Title card in 2020
- Genre: Cooking show
- Written by: Ansel Beluso
- Directed by: Ogi Sugatan
- Presented by: Boy Logro; Bettina Carlos; Chynna Ortaleza
- Country of origin: Philippines
- Original language: Tagalog

Production
- Camera setup: Multiple-camera setup
- Running time: 30–42 minutes
- Production company: GMA Entertainment Group

Original release
- Network: GMA News TV
- Release: July 3, 2011 – December 20, 2020

Idol sa Kusina (transl. idol in kitchen / international title: Kitchen Idol) is a Philippine television cooking show broadcast by GMA News TV. Originally hosted by Boy Logro and Bettina Carlos, it premiered on July 3, 2011. Logro and Chynna Ortaleza served as the final hosts. The show concluded on December 20, 2020.

== Hosts ==
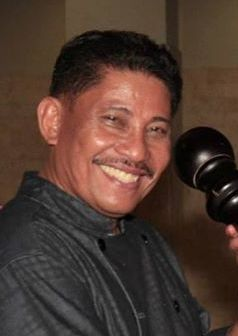
Boy Logro served as a host.

- Boy Logro (2011–20)
- Bettina Carlos (2014–17)
- Chynna Ortaleza (2017–20)

== Production ==
In March 2020, the admission of a live audience in the studio and production were suspended due to the enhanced community quarantine in Luzon caused by the COVID-19 pandemic. The show resumed its programming on August 16, 2020.

== Accolades ==
Accolades received by Idol sa Kusina
Year	Award	Category	Recipient	Result	Ref.
2015	29th PMPC Star Awards for Television	Best Educational Program	Idol sa Kusina	Nominated	
2015	29th PMPC Star Awards for Television	Best Educational Program Host	Boy Logro	Nominated	
2016	30th PMPC Star Awards for Television	Best Educational Program	Idol sa Kusina	Nominated	
2016	30th PMPC Star Awards for Television	Best Educational Program Host	Boy Logro	Nominated	
2016	US International Film and Video Festival	Certificate for Creative Excellence (Cooking category)	Idol sa Kusina	Won	
2017	Anak TV Seal Awards		Idol sa Kusina	Won	
2017	31st PMPC Star Awards for Television	Best Educational Program	Idol sa Kusina	Nominated	
2017	31st PMPC Star Awards for Television	Best Educational Program Host	Boy Logro Bettina Carlos Chynna Ortaleza	Nominated	
2018	32nd PMPC Star Awards for Television	Best Educational Program	Idol sa Kusina	Nominated	
2018	32nd PMPC Star Awards for Television	Best Educational Program Host	Boy Logro	Nominated	
2019	33rd PMPC Star Awards for Television	Best Educational Program	Idol sa Kusina	Nominated	
2019	33rd PMPC Star Awards for Television	Best Educational Program Host	Boy Logro Chynna Ortaleza	Nominated	
2021	34th PMPC Star Awards for Television	Best Educational Program	Idol sa Kusina	Nominated	
2021	34th PMPC Star Awards for Television	Best Educational Program Host	Boy Logro Chynna Ortaleza	Nominated	
