= Malou de Guzman =

Filipino actress (born 1957)

- Born: Maria Lourdes Arnaldo De Guzman; July 18, 1957 (age 69); Manila, Philippines
- Occupations: Actress; acting coach
- Years active: 1980–present
- Children: 2

Malou de Guzman (born July 18, 1957) is a Filipino stage, television and film actress.

== Personal life ==
De Guzman has a daughter Luchie, with former actor Ross Rival. She graduated from the University of the Philippines-Diliman (UP-Diliman) with a degree in broadcast communication. She was primarily doing theater roles before her breakthrough role in Ober Da Bakod. De Guzman started teaching broadcasting and TV acting in UP-Diliman in 1988 and still does up to 2026.

Apart from acting, she has also worked as an acting coach. She teaches an acting method that also includes wellness, which she calls in-urge-gy (portmanteau of inner, urge, and energy).

== Filmography ==
=== Film ===
Year	Title	Role	Notes	Source
1980	Aguila	Friend of Dino	Uncredited	
1984	Bagets	The 'Sabets'		
1984	Sister Stella L.	Soledad		
1988	One Day, Isang Araw	Auntie		
1988	Babaing Hampaslupa	Nancy		
1990	Dyesebel	Marina		
1990	Shake, Rattle & Roll II	An aswang	"Aswang" segment	
1991	Maging Sino Ka Man	Letty		
1991	Makiusap Ka sa Diyos	Sister Amanda		
1992	Shake, Rattle & Roll IV	Mrs. Mallari	"Ang Kapitbahay" segment	
1994	Ober da Bakod: The Movie	Aling Lucring		
1996	Ober da Bakod 2 (Da Treasure Adbentyur)	Aling Lucring		
2007	Angels	Senyang		
2008	My Big Love	Zeny Capistrano		
2010	Miss You Like Crazy	Maxima		
2010	Cinco	Madam Osang	"Puso" segment	
2011	Tumbok	Elsie		
2011	The Unkabogable Praybeyt Benjamin	Lilibeth Santos		
2012	Born to Love You	Ampie Liwanag		
2013	Bekikang: Ang Nanay Kong Beki	Anacleta		
2014	The Amazing Praybeyt Benjamin	Lilibeth Santos		
2024	And the Breadwinner Is...	Momshie Salvador (Bambi's mother)		
2025	The Delivery Rider	Aling Maring		

=== Television ===
Year	Title	Role	Notes	Source
1991	Maalaala Mo Kaya		Episode: "Komiks"	
1991	Maalaala Mo Kaya		Episode: "Noche Buena"	
1991	Maalaala Mo Kaya		Episode: "Dapithapon"	
1992	Ober Da Bakod	Aling Lucring		
1999	G-mik	Yaya Medel		
1999	Saan Ka Man Naroroon		Special Participation	
1999	Maalaala Mo Kaya		Episode: "Harang-Taga"	
2001	Eto Na Ang Susunod Na Kabanata			
2001	Maalaala Mo Kaya	Nanay	Episode: "US Visa"	
2004	Marina	Dugong	Antagonist	
2005	Maalaala Mo Kaya		Episode: "Marmol"	
2005	Kampanerang Kuba	Sister Marcelina		
2006	Komiks Presents: Sandok ni Boninay	Señora Factora		
2006	Komiks Presents: Inday Sa Balitaw	Nitang		
2006	Pinoy Dream Academy: Season 1	Herself / Faculty		
2006	Maging Sino Ka Man	Bebeng		
2007	Love Spell Presents: My Soulfone			
2007	Maging Sino Ka Man: Ang Pagbabalik	Bebeng		
2007	Pinoy Dream Academy: Season 2	Herself / Faculty		
2008	Maalaala Mo Kaya	Jane	Episode: "Mansyon"	
2008	Kahit Isang Saglit	Marian Dimaandal		
2008	Maalaala Mo Kaya	Myrna	Episode: "Kalabaw"	
2009	Maalaala Mo Kaya	Rosario Borja-Viceral	Episode: "Bola" (Life story of Vice Ganda)	
2009	Maalaala Mo Kaya	Mang	Episode: "Karnabal"	
2009	Katorse	Nena Reyes		
2009	George and Cecil	Ched Castro		
2010	Rod Santiago's Agua Bendita	Rosie Ramirez		
2010	1DOL	Sharona Sulangan		
2010	Maalaala Mo Kaya	Belen	Episode: "Passbook"	
2011	Maalaala Mo Kaya	Tita	Episode: "Siomai"	
2011	Wansapanataym	Socorro Jovenal	Episode: "Sabay-Sabay Pasaway"	
2011	Maalaala Mo Kaya	Rita	Episode: "Susi"	
2011	Ikaw ay Pag-Ibig	Ima		
2012	Wako Wako	Teresing Gaudencio		
2012	Kahit Puso'y Masugatan	Madonna Toledo		
2012	Maalaala Mo Kaya	Esther	Episode: "Esther"	
2013	Maalaala Mo Kaya	Petra	Episode: "Sapatos"	
2014	Maalaala Mo Kaya	Teresita	Episode: "Abito"	
2014	Ipaglaban Mo!	Gloria	Episode: "Nang Dahil Sa Utang"	
2015	Bridges of Love	Vida		
2015	Maalaala Mo Kaya	Gng. Tayrus	Episode: "Watawat"	
2015	FPJ's Ang Probinsyano	Lolit Fajardo-Corpuz		
2017	Wildflower	Lorena “Loring” Cervantes		
2019	The Killer Bride	Marichu “Manay Ichu” Sagrado		
2021	Maalaala Mo Kaya	Corsing Cuarenta	Episode: "Blouse"	
2021	I Can See You: On My Way to You!	Viviana "Manang Baby" Fajardo		
2022	Lolong	Isabel Candelaria		
2022	Beach Bros	Chona		
2024	Love. Die. Repeat.	Kanlaon		
2025	Incognito	Esang "Apo" Malvar		
2025	Maalaala Mo Kaya	Edita Catacutan	Episode: Camera	
2025	What Lies Beneath	Dolores		

=== Microdrama ===
Year	Title	Role
2026	Aure de Peligro	Rosa

=== Theater ===
Year	Title	Role	Notes	Source
1988	Kagat sa Mansanas		CCP Tanghalang Pambansa	
2002	The Vagina Monologues		CCP Folk Arts Theater	
2002	Insiang	Pacing	CCP Tanghalang Pambansa	

== Awards and nominations ==
Year	Award	Category	Work	Result	Source
1996	PMPC Star Awards for Television	Best Comedy Actress	Ober Da Bakod	Won	
2004	PMPC Star Awards for Television	Best Drama Actress	Marina	Nominated	
