= Tres (2014 film) =

- Directed by: Jose N. Carreon ("Faith, Love, Time & Dr. Lazaro"); William G. Mayo ("Tata Selo"); Edgardo "Boy" Vinarao ("Sandaang Damit")
- Screenplay by: Jeffrey Yap ("Faith, Love, Time & Dr. Lazaro"); Julie L. Po ("Tata Selo"); Therese Ann Cayaba ("Sandaang Damit")
- Based on: "Faith, Love, Time and Dr. Lazaro" by George C. Brillantes "Tata Selo" by Rogelio Sikat "Sandaang Damit" by Fanny A. Garcia
- Starring: see below
- Cinematography: Roy B. Apuyan; Edward Mayo
- Edited by: Edgardo "Boy" Vinarao; Edward Mayo; Thaddeus Acosta
- Music by: Charlie Fry
- Production companies: Film Academy of the Philippines; Film Development Council of the Philippines; National Commission for Culture and the Arts
- Release date: November 8, 2014 (QCinema)
- Country: Philippines
- Languages: Filipino; English

Tres is a 2014 Filipino anthology drama film produced by the Film Academy of the Philippines (FAP) as part of its "Sine Panitik" (transl. Cine Literate) project. Directed by Jose N. Carreon, William G. Mayo and Edgardo "Boy" Vinarao, all of whom being established filmmakers in the action genre, Tres adapts three local short stories that have won a Palanca Award: "Faith, Love, Time and Dr. Lazaro" by George C. Brillantes, "Tata Selo" by Rogelio Sikat, and "Sandaang Damit" by Fanny A. Garcia.

With its production funded by the FAP, the Film Development Council of the Philippines (FDCP), and the National Commission for Culture and the Arts (NCCA), the film was made available for screenings in schools in late 2014, with a theatrical distribution strategy being abandoned due to piracy concerns. It was also screened as an entry to the 2nd QCinema International Film Festival on November 8, 2014.

== Cast ==
"Faith, Love, Time & Dr. Lazaro"

- Bembol Roco as Dr. Lazaro
- Jethro Ramirez as Ben
- Shamaine Centenera-Buencamino as Dr. Lazaro's wife
- Ping Medina as Esteban
- Connie Sarion as dorm owner
- Mary Rose Balbuena as Esteban's wife

"Tata Selo"

- Leo Martinez as Tata Selo
- Jerico Estregan
- Rez Cortez
- Menggie Cobarrubias
- Mara Lopez
- Maria Isabel Lopez

"Sandaang Damit"

- Rcee Tenefrancia
- Ela Bautista
- Jazzyl Torreflores
- Richard Quan
- Ynez Veneracion

== Release ==
Actor Leo Martinez, who is also director general of the Film Academy of the Philippines, decided to forgo a theatrical distribution plan for Tres and instead make it available in late 2014 for educational screenings in schools, stating that it was done due to fears of piracy. It was also screened in competition at the 2nd QCinema International Film Festival in Quezon City on November 8, 2014.
