= Immaculate Conception Parish Church (Balayan) =

Roman Catholic church in Batangas, Philippines

Balayan Church
- Immaculate Conception Parish Church
- Iglesia Parroquial de la Inmaculada Concepción (Spanish)
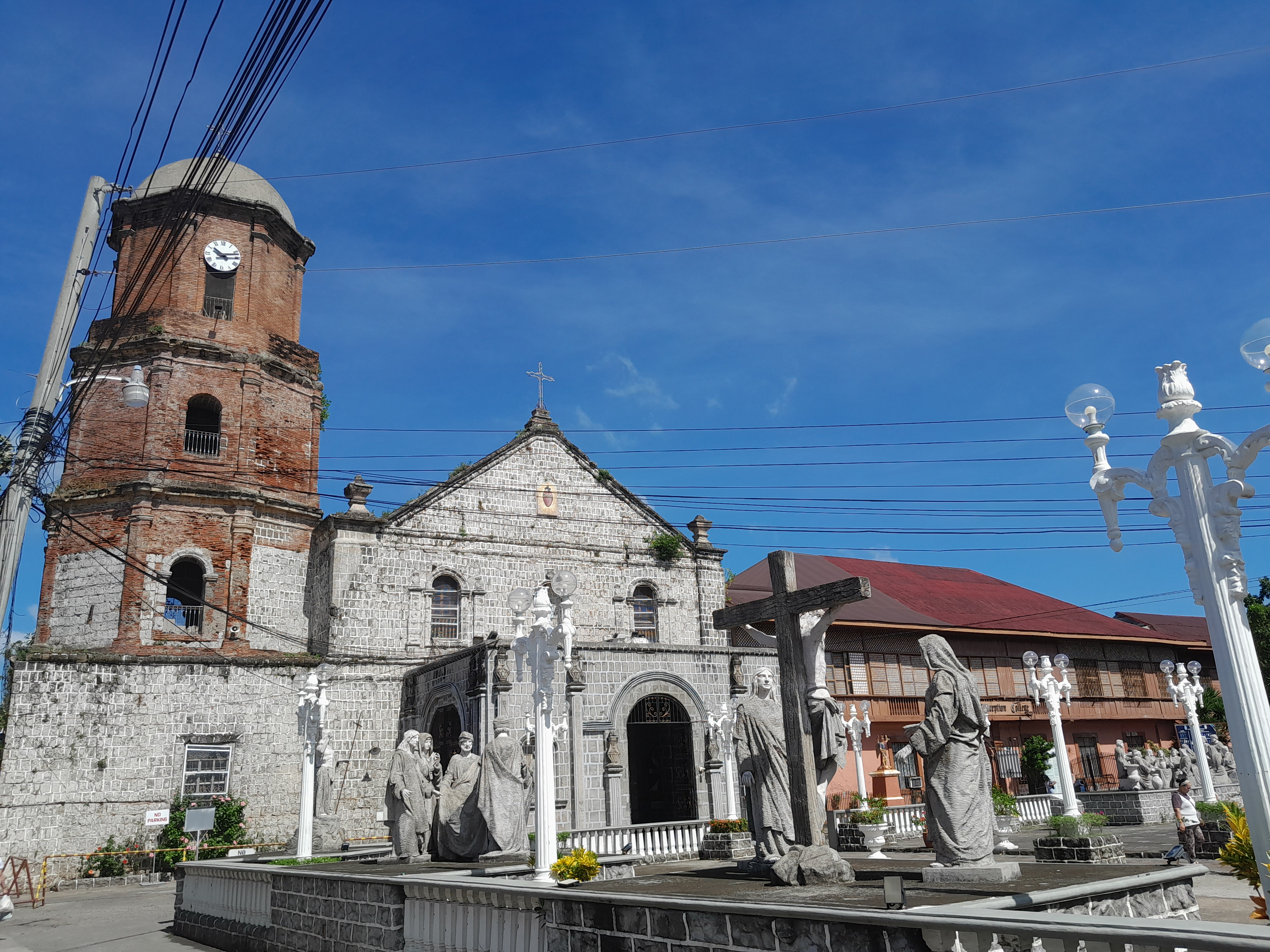
- Church facade in 2023

- Location in Luzon Location in the Philippines
- 13°56′17″N 120°43′43″E
- Location: Plaza Mabini Street, Balayan, Batangas 4213
- Country: Philippines
- Denomination: Catholic

History
- Status: Parish church
- Founded: 1759
- Dedication: Immaculate Conception
- Consecrated: 1759

Architecture
- Functional status: Active
- Heritage designation: National Cultural Treasure
- Designated: 2001
- Architectural type: Church building
- Style: Baroque
- Groundbreaking: 1748
- Completed: 1752

Specifications
- Materials: Coral, wood, and bricks

Administration
- Archdiocese: Lipa

Immaculate Conception Parish Church, commonly known as Balayan Church, is a Roman Catholic parish church in the town of Balayan, Batangas in the Philippines, under the jurisdiction of the Archdiocese of Lipa. The church is listed as a National Cultural Treasure as its construction was supervised by Filipino seculars during the Spanish colonial period.

== Church history ==
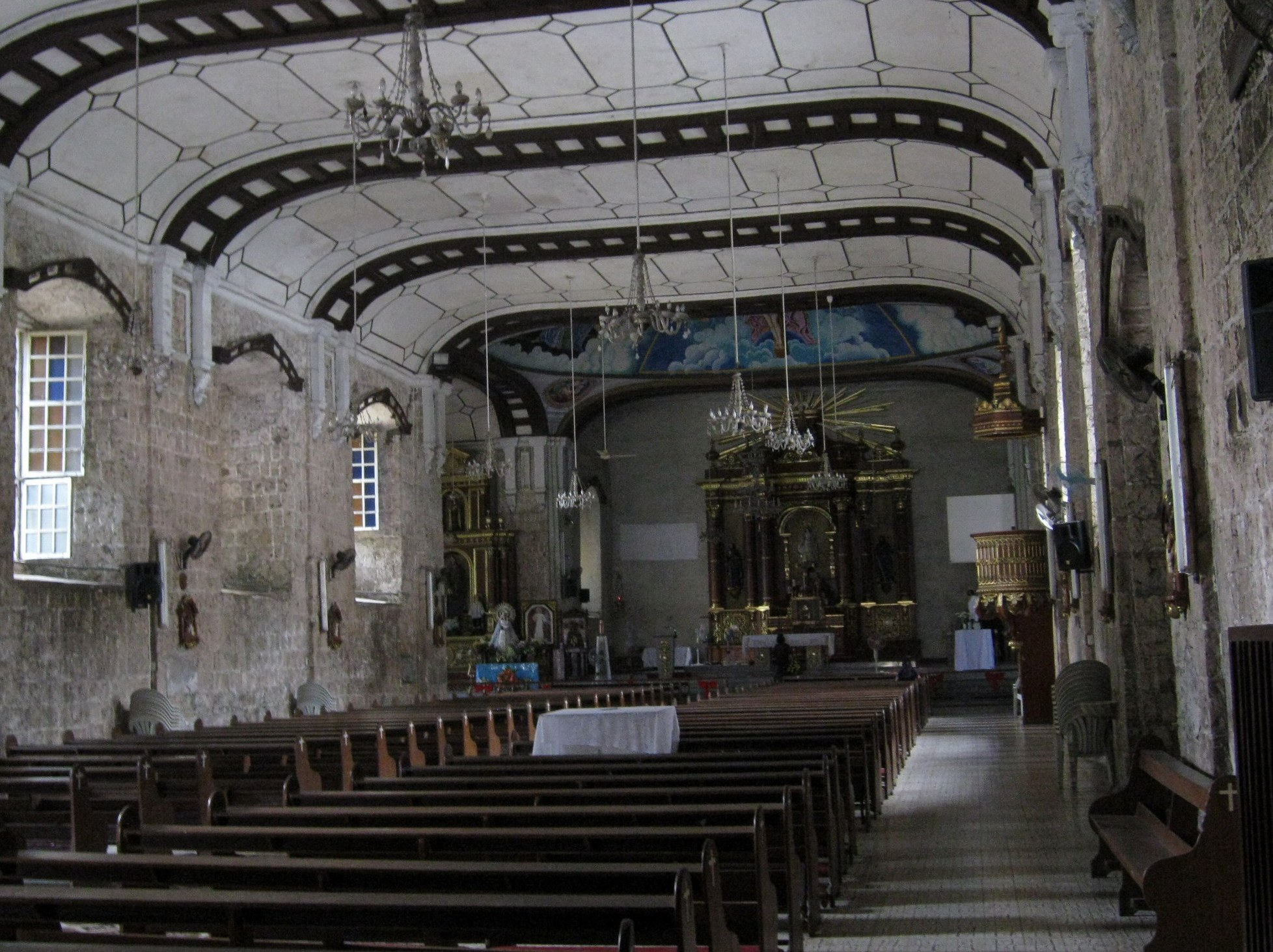
Church nave in 2014

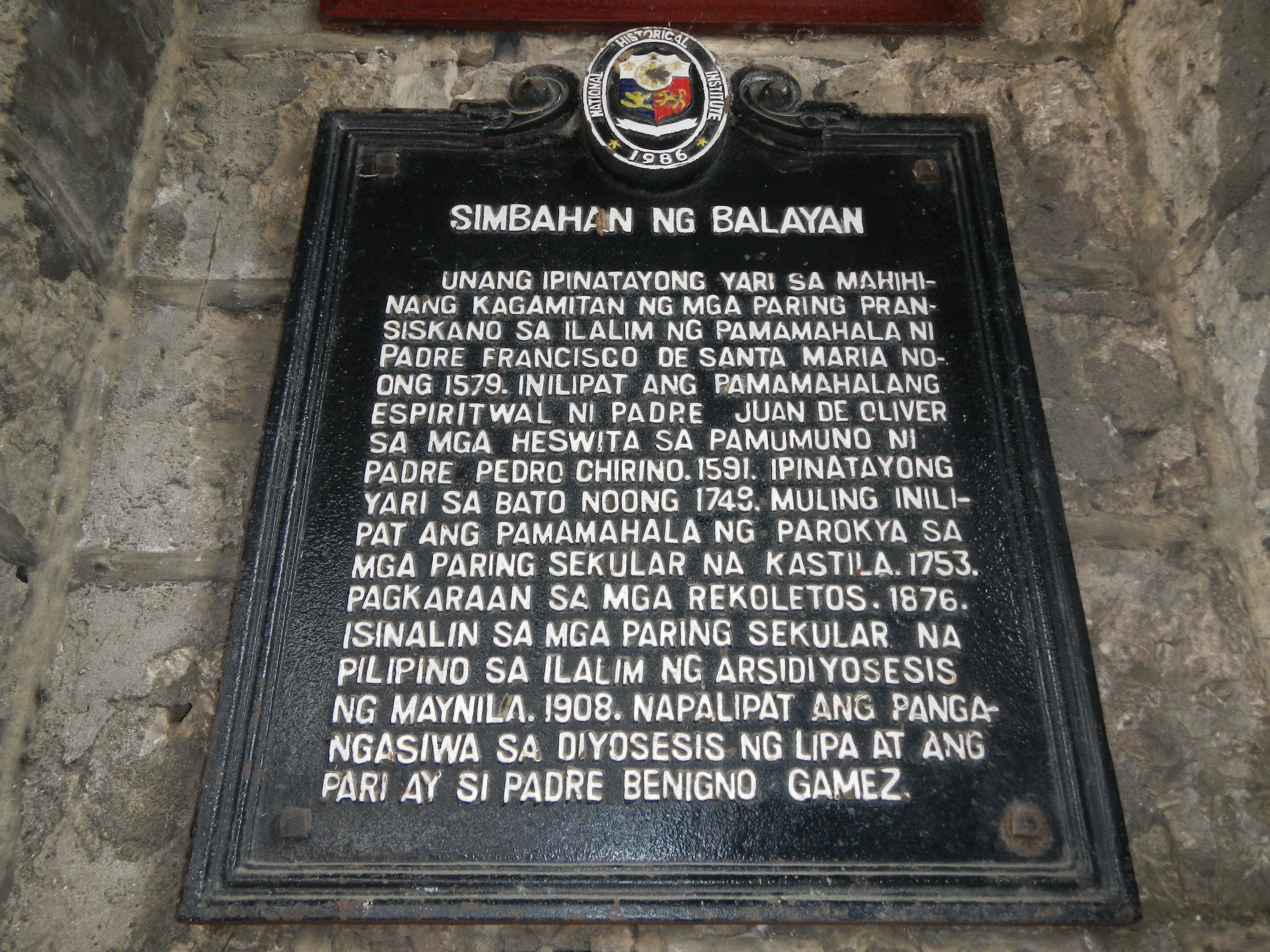
Church NHI historical marker installed in 1986

In 1575, the Augustinians made Balayan a visita of Bombon, now Taal. Balayan originally comprised what are now the independent towns and parishes of Nasugbu, Lian, Calatagan, Tuy, and Calaca. In 1578, however, this territory was turned over to the Franciscans who in turn passed Balayan to the Jesuits in 1591. In 1591, the church was constructed and blessed by. Fr. Pedro Chirino, S.J.

In 1795, a new stone church was blessed and dedicated in honor of the Immaculate Conception, the Patroness of Balayan. In 1876, the parish was turned over to the Augustinian Recollects, who remained until the outbreak of the Philippine Revolution.

In 1857, a new convent of strong materials was finished. The old convent, on the other side of the patio was demolished, its tiles used for the ermita for the cemetery which was being constructed.

In 1870, the second and third levels of the belfry, as well as the upper level of the convent had to be demolished due to damages cause by earthquakes. A temporary chapel was built while the big church underwent repairs. In 1875, the archbishop authorized the purchase of a retablo mayor, pulpit, acheros, and other decorations for the church. Planks of narra were used for the floor of the nave, while blue and white tiles were fitted to the main altar. An extension was added behind the church to serve as an antesacristy in 1878. The decorative iron grilles were put around the atrium in 1887. The campanario was repaired in 1892 with bricks instead of stones used for the upper second and third stories.

Construction of the cemetery on the hill was commenced in 1857. The chapel and rows of niches were built in 1887. Erosion in 1896 necessitated the further fortification of the walls on the sides of the hill.

After the revolution, the Recollects were replaced by Filipino seculars who were later driven out by the American troops in 1900 and stayed in the church for at least a year.

== The Old Cota ==
Balayan church complex originally had stone fortifications as a measure against pirates who have sacked the town at least three times. After a raid in 1754, a stone cota or fort was erected with the church and convent inside. To guard the bay, a small fortification was also constructed on top of a hill on the other end of the town. This fortified church survived well in the nineteenth century; the walls of the cota were taken down probably about the same time as those of Bauan and Batangas, in the 1840s.

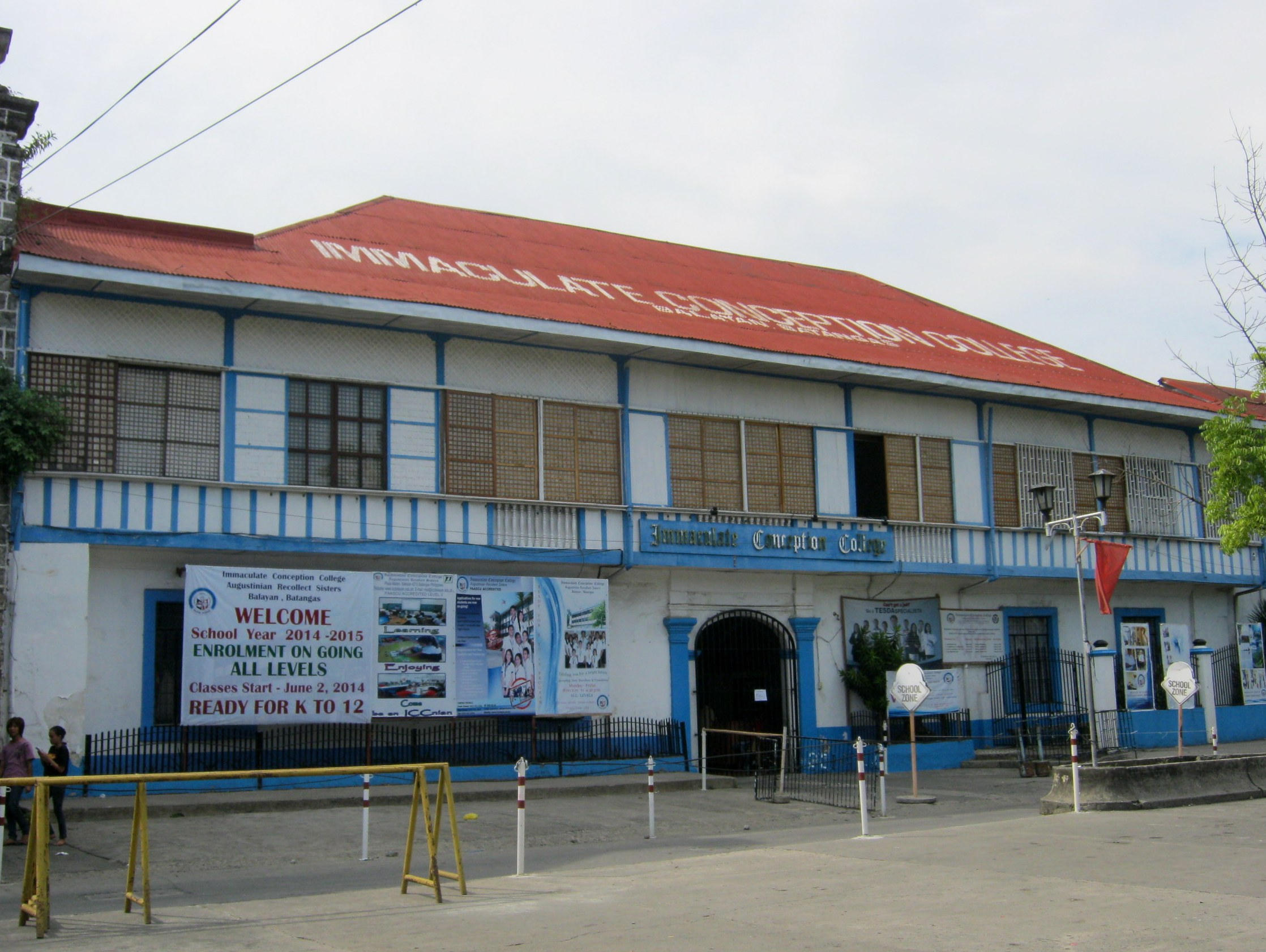
Old convent of the Balayan Church now used by the Immaculate Conception College Balayan

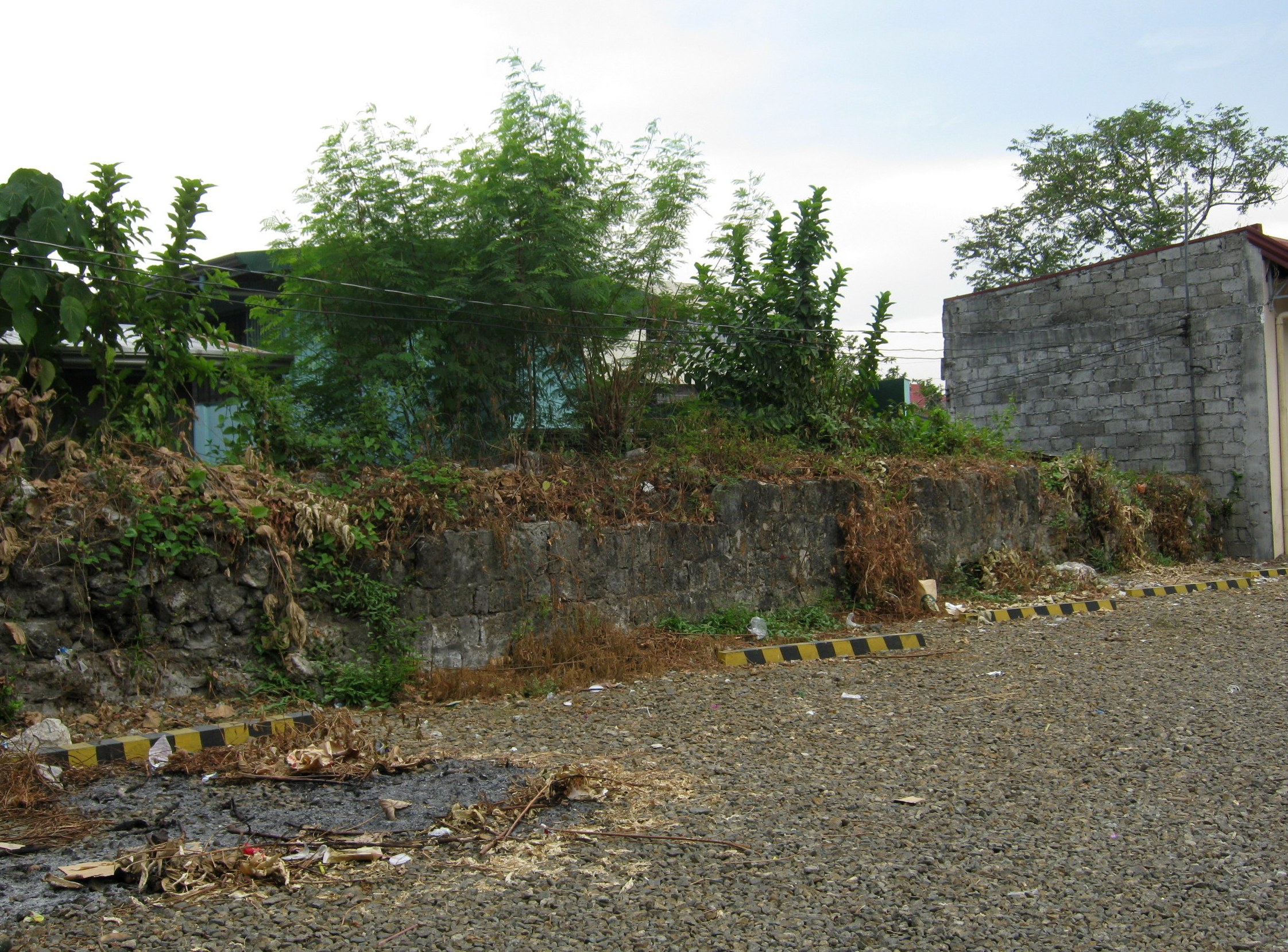
Walls of the Old Cota of Balayan Church
