= Clemencia López =

Filipina activist (1872–1963)

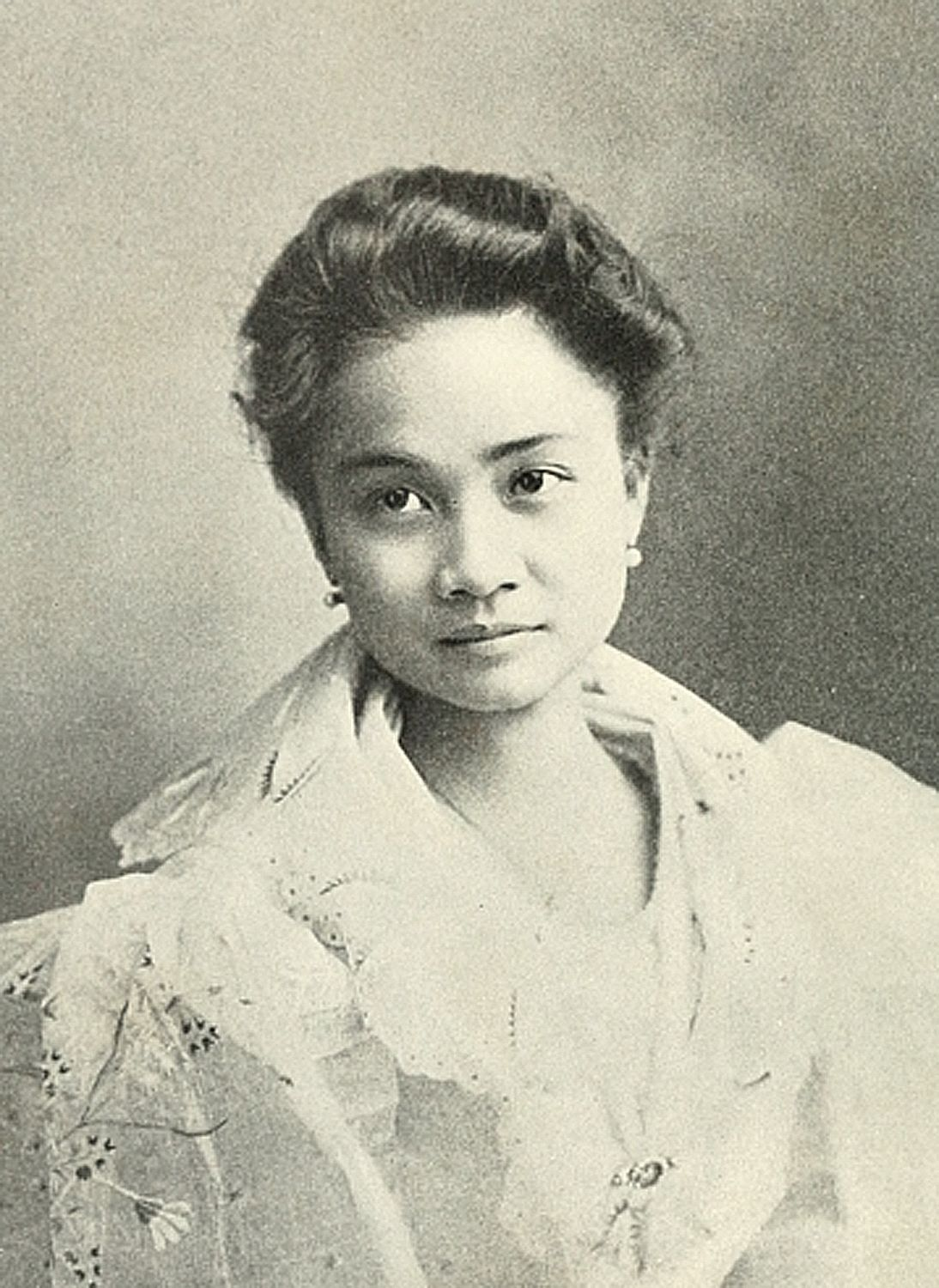
- Born: November 23, 1872; Balayan, Batangas, Captaincy General of the Philippines
- Died: June 4, 1963 (aged 90); United States
- Occupation: Activist
- Parent(s): Natalio López (father); María Castelo (mother)
- Relatives: Sixto López (brother)

Clemencia López y Castelo (November 23, 1872 – June 4, 1963) was a Filipina activist involved in the movement for Philippine independence. López was born into a wealthy Filipino family, and many of her siblings were also notable activists in the struggle for Philippine independence. In 1901, López set out on a nearly two-year journey across the United States, petitioning for the freedom of three of her brothers who had been imprisoned by the American military in the Philippines. Throughout her stay in the United States, López drew attention to the Philippine independence movement, became the first Filipina to ever enter the White House, and spent time studying at Wellesley College. López returned to the Philippines in 1903, where she spent the remainder of her life campaigning for both Philippine independence and encouraging women to take on a greater role in public life.

== Early life ==
Clemencia López was born in 1872 in Balayan, Batangas province, in the Philippines, to Natalio López and Maria Castelo. Her father, Natalio, who died in 1886, was a businessman who had a history of publicly criticizing Spanish colonial rule. Natalio's pro-independence stance would be reflected in the positions many of his children later adopted.

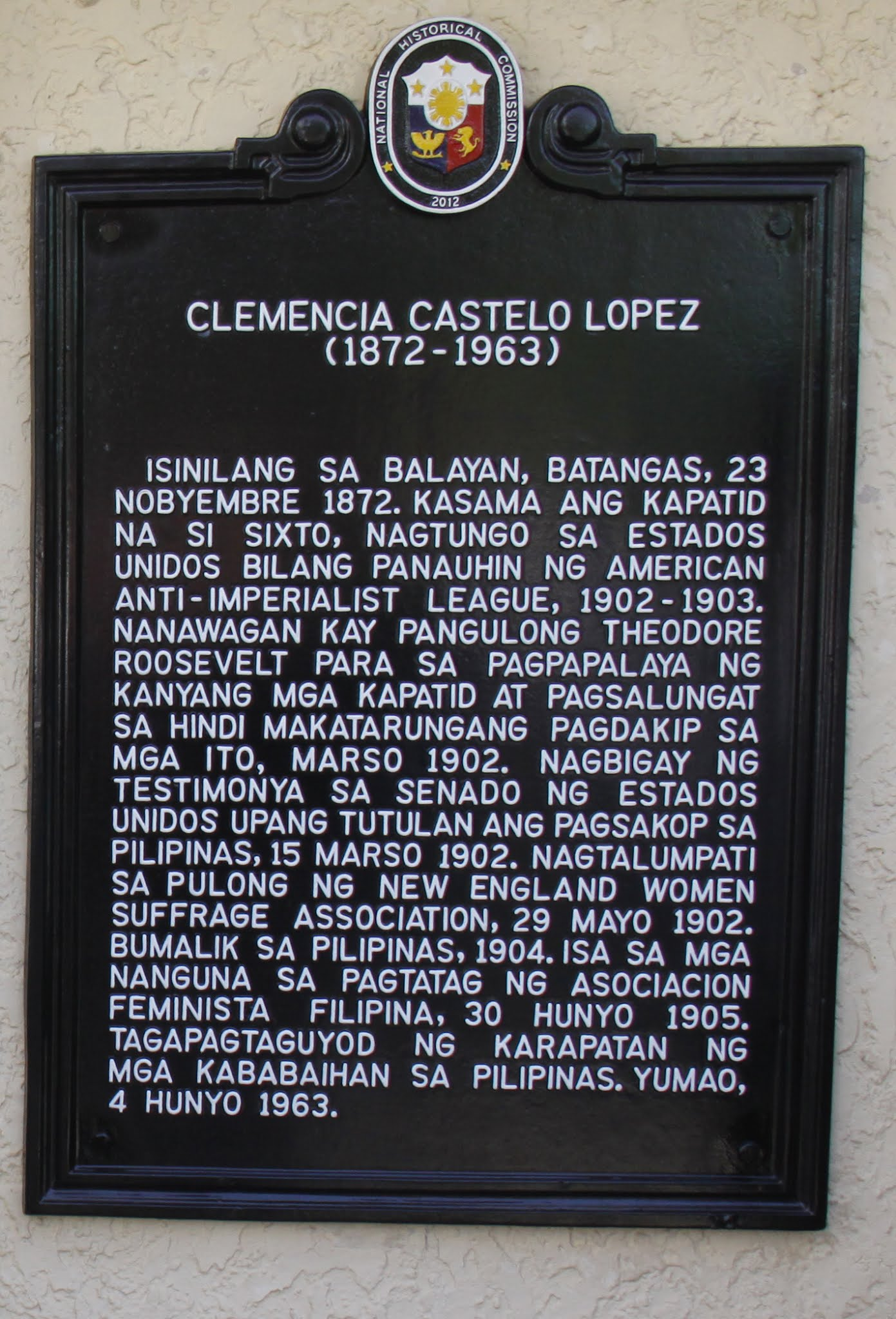
Historical marker installed in 2013 at the family house in Balayan

López was one of ten children. She had six brothers – Mariano, Lorenzo, Sixto, Cipriano, Manuel, and José – and three sisters – Andrea, Juliana, and Maria. Several of the López children became pro-independence activists, notably Sixto López.

In her early life, López mainly assisted her mother and sisters in domestic affairs, with little to no public role or prominence in the public sphere in the Philippines. Clemencia herself never earned a university degree. Unlike some of her more activist brothers, López did not overtly adopt an anti-imperialist, pro-independence stance as the United States, which took over the Philippines in 1898 following the Spanish-American War, became increasingly imperialistic. At the time, Filipino nationalism was both male-dominated and sexist. Prominent male Filipino nationalists, such as José Rizal, did not view Filipino women as equal citizens or partners in the political struggle for freedom.

== Journey to the United States and activism ==
=== Journey ===
The López family experienced firsthand the impact of American imperialism in the Philippines. Several of the López brothers were involved in some form with the Philippine revolutionary movement against the American presence in the Philippines, led by Emilio Aguinaldo. Both Sixto and Cipriano López served in the so-called Aguinaldo Army. Sixto, a loud advocate of Filipino independence, was inspired by the writings of José Rizal, and he himself also wrote and distributed anti-American imperialism literature. By 1901, as American hostility increased, he had retreated to a voluntary exile in Hong Kong. On 13 December 1901, three of the López brothers – Lorenzo, Cipriano, and Manuel – were arrested by American General J. Franklin Bell for their suspected role in the Philippine insurgency against the Americans.

The free members of the López family made several entreaties to American authorities in Manila for the freedom of the three imprisoned López brothers but were rejected. The López family believed the imprisonment of the brothers was unjust, especially as none of them were ever officially charged with a crime or brought to trial. Clemencia López, then 26 years old, resolved to travel to the United States herself to plea for her brothers’ freedom in person to the American President. López first visited her brother Sixto in Hong Kong for two weeks, and then set out for the United States in an unprecedented international voyage for a young Filipino woman.

=== Mission in the United States ===
In 1901, López arrived in the United States with the sponsorship of Fiske Warren, executive of the American Anti-Imperialist League (AIL). The AIL was mainly focused on opposing American involvement and imperialism in the Philippines and rallying citizens for Filipino independence. In the United States, López stayed with Fiske's sister, Cornelia Lyman Warren, who was an activist herself working for the settlement movement. López's close connection to the Warren family allowed her to build an anti-imperialist network in the United States, especially with like-minded women who were eager to bring reforms to society.

López would end up spending approximately nineteen months in the United States. While López's mission to free her brothers ultimately failed, she did briefly meet President Theodore Roosevelt in March 1902, purportedly making her the first Filipina to ever enter the White House. However, despite this visit, the President rejected Clemencia's petition to free her brothers. On 23 April 1902 George B. Cortelyou, President Roosevelt's secretary, wrote to López that, regarding the imprisonment of her brothers, "there appears to be a consensus of opinion that no injustice was done". As it was, the López brothers were freed a few weeks later due to an unrelated United States Army decision that guerilla fighters in the Philippines were no longer a significant threat. During López's stay in the United States, the country also began a series of congressional hearings on American presence in the Philippines. No Filipino, including López, was asked to appear before the Senate committee.

According to historian Laura Prieto, López's mission in the United States became twofold, extending beyond the petition to free her brothers. During López's journey through the United States, she gained recognition for her anti-imperialist and pro-independence activism for the Philippines. López, as a representative of Filipinos in the United States, debunked racist and sexist American stereotypes of Filipinos as savages and uncivilized. She challenged the American doctrine of "benevolent assimilation," a key contemporary American justification for the occupation of the Philippines which emphasized the American civilising mission. Indeed, López denounced American imperialism for exacerbating gender inequality and restricting civilian freedoms. She insisted that the United States’ imperialist policies were not contributing to the uplifting of the Philippines but rather were detrimental to her country. López, through the public image she conveyed, acted as living proof that Filipinos were civilized enough for self-government. In American newspapers, Clemencia López was described for her poise, intelligence, and beauty. López's Maria Clara style of dress and presentation was inherently part of López's anti-imperialist mission across the United States: Clemencia appeared in traditional Filipino “native costume” in front of reporters, rejecting Americanization while simultaneously asserting Filipino independence. López herself publicly argued that Filipinos “were already civilized” before the Spanish had even arrived in the sixteenth century, confusing American audiences and their preconceived notions of Filipino civilization.

=== Speech to the New England Woman Association ===
As a young woman, López was more effective at reaching audiences who, if she had been older or male, likely would have perceived her as a threat. While her brothers were considered enemies of the American state, López managed to claim a public role for Filipino women in the United States. López is most widely recognized for her speech on 29 May 1902 to the New England Woman Suffrage Association at the Park Street Church in Boston.

In front of an audience of three hundred, many of whom had never seen a Filipino in their lives, López, speaking in Spanish, said:

You can do much to bring about the cessation of these horrors and cruelties which are today taking place in the Philippines, and to insist upon a more human course. . . you ought to understand that we are only contending for the liberty of our country, just as you once fought for the same liberty for yours...

López also denounced American imperialism for exacerbating gender inequality in the Philippines, openly rejected American conceptions of "benevolent assimilation", and discussed the ongoing "horrors and cruelties" occurring in the Philippines under American rule. López encouraged American suffragist women to use their political weight to participate in and influence any American investigation into the situation in the Philippines. López's speech was translated into English in the Woman's Journal in what became her most prominent public event. The speech was reprinted in some American newspapers, and resulted in interviews with the Boston Globe and St. Paul Globe, enhancing López's public profile and broadening her audience.

=== Wellesley College and departure ===
During her stay in the United States Clemencia also enrolled at Wellesley College, an institution known for welcoming students from diverse backgrounds. It was here at Wellesley, as well as with her primary host, Cornelia Warren, that Clemencia would spend the majority of her time in the United States. The opportunity to study at Wellesley was particularly rare for López as university was still not available to Filipinas back at home. While López did not earn a university degree, she did benefit from access to notable scholars, including economist and historian Katharine Coman, as well as opportunities to improve her English language skills, which allowed her to better communicate with American audiences.

In the Fall of 1903, López finally returned to the Philippines. One hundred people gathered to say farewell to López in 1903, including Moorfield Storey, George Boutwell, and William Lloyd Garrison Jr.

== Later life and legacy ==
=== Later life ===
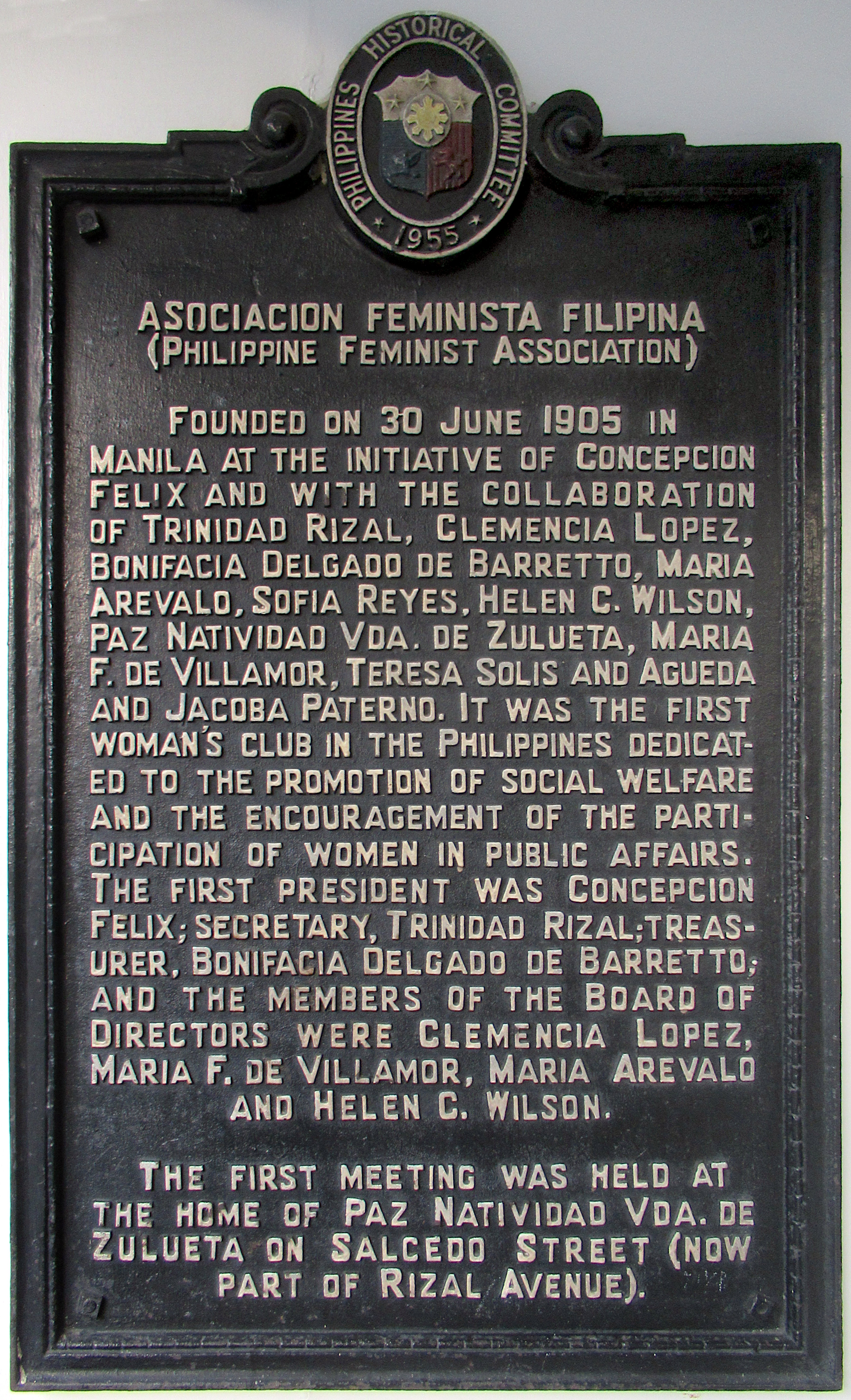
Historical marker created by the Philippines Historical Committee in 1955 to commemorate the Asociación Feminista Filipina

Little is known about López's later life in the Philippines. In 1905, she was a founder of the Asociación Feminista Filipina (AFF), the first women's rights organization in the Philippines. The AFF encouraged women's role in public life and encouraged women to participate in nation-building in the Philippines. For the remainder of her life, López continued campaigning for the complete independence of the Philippines (achieved in 1946), and campaigned for women's equality until her death in 1963.

=== Legacy ===
López's actions throughout her life challenged racist and sexist stereotypes prevalent in the early twentieth century United States. As a feminist, López also countered American notions of Filipino women as subjugated and submissive. López is remarkable for, as a woman from a colonized territory, entering the public sphere and rejecting American imperialist policies and ideas on American soil. When López left the United States in 1903, American speakers such as suffragist Fanny Ames and Professor Katharine Coman praised López for her representation of the Philippines. Despite these contributions, López's journey and public prominence did not directly lead to Philippine independence, nor did it immediately change American public opinion towards Filipinos more broadly. Some white American feminists, who argued for the existence of the white women's burden, continued to view Filipino women as subjugated and helpless, regardless of López's refutations.

=== Recognition ===
Clemencia López and her family have recently started receiving more recognition in the United States and in the Philippines. On 15 June 2013, in honor of the centennial of the end of the Philippine American War, the City of Philadelphia Mural Arts Program unveiled "Alab ng Puso: My Heart's Sole Burning Fire", the first Filipino mural in the East Coast of the United States. Clemencia Lopez was depicted as one of the three largest portraits painted at the central part of the 22' x 60' mural honoring her as one of the three "Mothers of History". Just the previous year, her story was extensively chronicled in the first book documenting the local history of Filipinos in Philadelphia, titled "Filipinos of Greater Philadelphia" since her brother, Sixto Lopez resided in Philadelphia while campaigning for the US recognition of Philippine Independence. In 2018, the Philippines Department of Foreign Affairs unveiled ten portraits of prominent Filipinos in history, including Clemencia López. The portraits were organized by Project Saysay, a Filipino advocacy group which seeks to shed light on great Filipinos in history. Prints of the portraits were featured in various Philippine embassies around the world, including at the Philippine Consulate General in New York in September 2018.

The López family home in Balayan is preserved in recognition of the López family. In 1997, the National Historical Commission of the Philippines (NHCP) placed a marker at the home recognizing Sixto López, and in 2013 the NHCP installed another marker recognizing Clemencia López for her patriotism.
