= Basta Every Day Happy =

Philippine television talk show

- Title card
- Genre: Talk show
- Directed by: Louie Ignacio
- Presented by: Gladys Reyes; Donita Rose; Alessandra De Rossi; Boy Logro
- Country of origin: Philippines
- Original language: Tagalog
- No. of episodes: 171

Production
- Executive producer: Gladys Hernando
- Camera setup: Multiple-camera setup
- Running time: 30–45 minutes
- Production company: GMA Entertainment TV

Original release
- Network: GMA Network
- Release: May 12, 2014 – January 5, 2015

Basta Every Day Happy (transl. just every day happy) is a Philippine television talk show broadcast by GMA Network. Directed by Louie Ignacio, it hosted by Gladys Reyes, Donita Rose, Alessandra De Rossi and Boy Logro. It premiered on May 12, 2014, on the network's morning line up. The show concluded on January 5, 2015, with a total of 171 episodes.

== Ratings ==
According to AGB Nielsen Philippines' Mega Manila household television ratings, the pilot episode of Basta Every Day Happy earned an 11.6% rating. The final episode scored a 6.9% rating.

== Accolades ==
Accolades received by Basta Every Day Happy
| Year | Award | Category | Recipient | Result | Ref. |
|---|---|---|---|---|---|
| 2014 | 28th PMPC Star Awards for Television | Best Variety Show | Basta Every Day Happy | Nominated | |
