= Superfetation =

Simultaneous presence of multiple stages of developing offspring in one animal

Superfetation (also spelled superfoetation – see fetus) is the simultaneous occurrence of more than one stage of developing offspring in the same animal. This phenomenon is extremely rare in humans, with only 10 confirmed cases until 2008.

In mammals, it manifests as the formation of an embryo from a subsequent menstrual cycle, while another embryo or fetus is already present in the uterus. When two separate instances of fertilization occur during the same menstrual cycle, it is known as superfecundation.

== Humans ==
While proposed cases of superfetation have been reported in humans, the existence of this phenomenon in humans has been deemed unlikely. Better explanations include differential growth between twins due to various reasons, such as twin-to-twin transfusion syndrome. Artificially-induced superfetation has been demonstrated, although only up to a short period after insemination.

A 2008 French study found evidence to suggest that superfetation is a reality for humans, but that it is so rare that there have been fewer than 10 recorded cases in the world.

In 2017, it was reported that an American woman who had agreed to act as a surrogate for a Chinese couple bore two babies, who were initially believed to be twins. Before the adoptive parents could return home to China, however, it was discovered that one of the babies was, in fact, the biological son of the surrogate. Doctors confirmed that the birth-mother had become pregnant with her and her partner's child, roughly three weeks after becoming pregnant with the Chinese couple's child.

Research has found that 10% of women release two eggs in a cycle, but both eggs are released at the end of the same "wave" of folliculogenesis, which does not support the theory of superfetation in humans.

In 2017, a woman in İzmir, Turkey, became pregnant with two babies conceived about a month apart and she gave birth to both on 7 October 2017. According to the news report this event has officially been registered in global medical records as the 12th superfetation case.

In September 2020, a woman in Wiltshire, England, gave birth to fraternal twins, who were conceived three weeks apart.

In July 2026, Filipina actress Bettina Carlos announced that she gave birth to superfetation twin sons.

== Other animals ==
Superfetation is normal for some species of poeciliid fish and has been clearly demonstrated for the European brown hare.

In domestic cats, superfecundation is common, but superfetation never has been definitively proven to occur.

Animals that have been claimed to be subject to superfetation include rodents (mice and rats), rabbits, horses, sheep, marsupials (kangaroos and sugar gliders), felines, and primates (humans).
