= Bettina Carlos =

Filipina actress and host

- Born: Anna Bettina Christina Pineda Carlos; December 25, 1987 (age 38); Makati, Philippines
- Other name: Bettina
- Occupations: Actress; host
- Years active: 2003–2018, 2026–present
- Agents: GMA Artist Center (2004–2006; 2012–2016); Star Magic (2007–2012, 2026–present)
- Known for: Izel Lorena-Guison in Yagit
- Spouse: Mikki Eduardo (m. 2020)
- Children: 4

Anna Bettina Christina Pineda Carlos-Eduardo (born December 25, 1987), known professionally as Bettina Carlos, is a Filipino actress and host. She started her career and a contract artist of GMA Network but later moved to rival station ABS-CBN, but during the year 2012 she moved back to her home network GMA 7. She played Izel Guison in Yagit, the main villain. She also played primary villainous roles in Sa Piling ni Nanay and Because of You.

She is one of the only ten or so confirmed cases of human mothers giving birth to superfetation twins.

== Career ==
Carlos was only 15 years old when she started appearing in GMA Network shows such as Love to Love and Kakabakaba. That was from 2003 to 2006, and then she tried working with ABS-CBN via being a personality on Studio 23 and then she did the drama series Magkano ang Iyong Dangal? and Wansapanataym. Then she disappeared for a while, and later turned out that she focused on her studies, and earned her degree in Management at the Ateneo University She is currently one of the writers in The Manila Times on the web and composed numerous articles as of now.

== Personal life ==
She has a daughter named Amanda Lucia, nicknamed "Gummy", who was born in March 2011.

She married Mikki Eduardo on December 2, 2020 and gave birth to a daughter, Amina Elizabeth, in December 2022. In July 2026, she announced that she gave birth to superfetation twin sons, Juanito and Antonino, marking one of the roughly ten confirmed instances of such a rare phenomenon in humans.

== Filmography ==
=== Film ===
Year	Title	Role
2004	Kilig... Pintig... Yanig...	N/A
2011	Segunda Mano	Samantha
2012	My Cactus Heart	Anna

=== Television ===
Year	Title	Role
2003–2004	Kakabakaba Adventures	
2004	Ikaw sa Puso Ko	
2004	Love to Love: Sweet Exchange	
2004	Mulawin	Florona
2004	Love to Love: True Romance	
2005	Art Angel: The Clown Special	Host
2010	Magkano ang Iyong Dangal?	Alona
2010	Precious Hearts Romances Presents: Love Me Again	Almira "Al" Ocampo
2010	Elena M. Patron's Momay	Raven Ocampo / Mary Lorenzo
2012	Wansapanataym: Incredibelle	Brenda
2012	Precious Hearts Romances Presents: Lumayo Ka Man Sa Akin	Ali
2012	Biritera	Clarissa
2012–2013	Temptation of Wife	Madel Salcedo
2013	My Husband's Lover	Vicky Araneta
2013	Bet on Your Baby	Contestant with her brother and her daughter
2013–2017	Idol sa Kusina	Host
2014	Villa Quintana	Janice
2014	Wagas	Mariz Umali
2014	Niño	Heidi Reyes
2014–2015	Yagit	Izel Lorena-Guison
2015	Magpakailanman: My Teacher, My Rapist	Teacher Grace
2015	Imbestigador: Three Children Die	Anjie
2015	Because of You	Patricia Sanchez
2016	Sa Piling ni Nanay	Wanda
2016	Hay, Bahay!	Barbie
2016	Magpakailanman: Ang Kriminal na Binuhay ng Diyos	Menchie
2016	Magpakailanman: Higanti ng Barang	Tetchie

== Awards ==
- Winner, 2004 PMPC Star Awards for Television's "Best Female New TV Personality" for Kakabakaba Adventure.
