= Boy Logro =

Filipino chef and television presenter (born 1954)

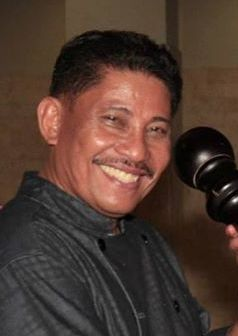
- Logro in August 2013
- Born: Pablo Logro; June 29, 1954 (age 71); Davao City, Philippines
- Education: AMA Computer College
- Political party: Aangat Kusinerong Pinoy
- Culinary career
- Cooking style: Filipino, Fusion
- Current restaurant: 7 Flavors Buffet Restaurant (San Juan, Metro Manila) Seafood Feast in Paluto Restaurant (Dubai)
- Television shows: Idol sa Kusina (2011–2020); Chef Boy Logro: Kusina Master (2012–2014)

Pablo Logro, also known as Boy Logro or Chef Boy (born June 29, 1954), is a Filipino celebrity chef known for his cooking shows, Idol sa Kusina and Chef Boy Logro: Kusina Master.

== Early and personal life ==
Pablo Logro was born into a fishing family in Davao City in the Philippines; he is the second son of eight children.

Logro first worked in Cagayan de Oro for 2 years, before becoming a member of the service crew of several Jollibee restaurants in Manila. He later became a sous chef at Qaboos bin Said al Said's Al Alam Palace which took him to international trips, in turn exposing Logro to international cuisines. He was also able to complete culinary training in Italy, Switzerland, Spain and the United Kingdom.

Logro became an executive chef at the Manila Diamond Hotel. His Favorite lines in cooking are Ping, ping, ping! and Yum, yum, yum!.

== Career ==
Logro was first known as being a presenter of the daytime cooking show Chef Boy Logro: Kusina Master. Logro owns the Chef Logro's Institute of Culinary and Kitchen Services.

In 2013, Logro appeared in the film The Fighting Chefs, marking his first action film role.

Logro also hosted another cooking show Idol sa Kusina which airs on Channel 27, GMA News TV (now GTV).

In 2021, Logro ran for House representative under the party-list system for Aangat Kusinerong Pinoy party-list. The party-list lost.

== Filmography ==
=== Television ===
Year	Title	Role
2010	Secrets of the Masters	Guest
2011	Kitchen Superstar	Judge
2011–2020	Idol sa Kusina	Host
2012–2014	Chef Boy Logro: Kusina Master	Host
2012	Eat Bulaga!	Himself / Performer
2012	Tweets for My Sweet	Boy Reyes
2012	Sarap Diva	Celebrity Chef
2014	Magpakailanman: Kusina Master, the Best Father	Himself
2014–2015	Basta Every Day Happy	Host
2017	D' Originals	Himself / Guest
2023	Anong Meron kay Abok?	Himself / Guest
2023	Balita Ko / Balitanghali	Himself / Tsibugan Na segment host

=== Film ===
Year	Title	Role
2012	Boy Pick-Up: The Movie	Boy Tokwa
2013	The Fighting Chefs	Chef

== See also ==
- GMA Network
