= List of Philippine television programs by date =

The following is a partial list of Philippine television programs by date of first broadcast in the Philippines. The lists of television programs are in reverse chronological order by year; within each year, the list is chronological.

== 1950s ==
- Student Canteen (July 21, 1958—June 9, 1990)

== 1960s ==
- The News with Uncle Bob (October 30, 1961—September 22, 1972)
- Uncle Bob's Lucky 7 Club (November 4, 1961—July 11, 1992)
- The Big News (March 19, 1962—April 7, 2004)
- Pangunahing Balita (March 19, 1962—July 31, 1998)
- Top 5 Update (March 19, 1962—September 22, 1972)
- Ano Ang Balita (April 16, 1962—September 22, 1972)
- Family Kuarta o Kahon (July 1, 1962—December 17, 2000)
- Hiwaga sa Bahay na Bato (September 30, 1963—January 25, 1964)
- Magandang Tanghali (January 9, 1965—September 27, 1968)
- The World Tonight (November 21, 1966—present)
- Balita Ngayon (February 20, 1967—February 27, 1987)
- Stop, Look, & Listen (September 28, 1968—April 14, 1972)
- Super Laff-In (February 1, 1969—March 26, 1999)
- Eyewitness Reports (July 14, 1969—May 29, 1970)

== 1970s ==
- NewsWatch (June 1, 1970—October 29, 2012)
- 12 O’ Clock High (April 15, 1972—September 22, 1972)
- John en Marsha (November 22, 1973—March 19, 1990)
- PBA on KBS (April 9, 1975—December 18, 1977)
- Kapwa Ko Mahal Ko (December 1, 1975—present)
- PBA on BBC (March 21, 1976—December 21, 1976)
- GMA News Digest (November 1, 1976—January 4, 1987)
- PBA on MBS (April 16, 1978—November 28, 1981)
- GMA Supershow (May 7, 1978—January 26, 1997)
- Eat Bulaga! (July 30, 1979—present)

== 1980s ==
- Anna Liza (February 4, 1980—September 13, 1985)
- Lovingly Yours, Helen (September 7, 1980—September 1, 1996)
- Ating Alamin (October 5, 1980—July 10, 2016)
- Nang Dahil sa Pag-Ibig (September 7, 1981—January 22, 1982)
- PBA on Vintage Sports (March 7, 1982—December 12, 1999)
- RPN NewsBreak (April 5, 1982—March 21, 2003)
- The Penthouse Live! (August 29, 1982—February 15, 1987)
- The 11:30 Report (November 1, 1982—May 16, 1986)
- Ang Iglesia ni Cristo (February 13, 1983—present)
- Yagit (April 25, 1983—August 2, 1985)
- Coney Reyes on Camera (May 19, 1984—December 26, 1998)
- Heredero (July 23, 1984—September 4, 1987)
- Amorsola (August 5, 1985—February 27, 1987)
- That's Entertainment (January 6, 1986—May 3, 1996)
- Mirasol del Cielo (September 16, 1985—February 27, 1987)
- Goin' Bananas (February 3, 1986—January 4, 1992)
- Pangunahing Balita Ala-Una (April 7, 1986—July 31, 1998)
- Early Evening Report (April 7, 1986—October 23, 1987)
- Early Late-Night Report (April 7, 1986—October 23, 1987)
- Heartbeat (April 16, 1986—December 16, 1987)
- FPJ sa GMA (May 3, 1986—April 26, 2026)
- GMA Balita (May 19, 1986—April 8, 1998)
- GMA Headline News (May 19, 1986—January 3, 1992)
- GMA Saturday/Sunday Report (May 24, 1986—August 20, 1989)
- Lunch Date (June 9, 1986—March 19, 1993)
- Balita sa IBC (July 14, 1986—November 24, 1989)
- Balita sa IBC Huling Ulat (July 14, 1986—November 24, 1989)
- Vilma (August 8, 1986—September 29, 1995)
- Andrea Amor (September 13, 1986—April 11, 1987)
- The Sharon Cuneta Show (September 14, 1986—June 15, 1997)
- Magandang Umaga Po (September 15, 1986—May 31, 1996)
- ABS-CBN News Advisory (September 15, 1986—September 4, 2005)
- Nestle Special (September 15, 1986—April 15, 1987)
- Luneta: Discovery Hour (September 15, 1986—November 21, 1986)
- Hilakbot (September 15, 1986—November 21, 1986)
- Ina (September 15, 1986—December 12, 1986)
- Mommy Ko, Daddy Ko! (September 18, 1986—September 10, 1987)
- Napakasakit, Kuya Eddie (September 18, 1986—April 28, 1988)
- Nine-Teeners (September 19, 1986—September 11, 1987)
- PEP (People, Events and Places) Talk (September 21, 1986—July 3, 1990)
- Sic O'Clock News (January 4, 1987—September 15, 1990)
- GMA News Live (January 5, 1987—July 14, 2002)
- Movie Magazine (February 28, 1987—September 23, 1995)
- TV Patrol (March 2, 1987—present)
- Palibhasa Lalake (March 3, 1987—November 9, 1998)
- Probe (March 6, 1987—June 30, 2010)
- Family Rosary Crusade (March 7, 1987—November 18, 2018)
- Martin and Pops Twogether (March 7, 1987—April 30, 1988)
- Dance-2-Nite (March 7, 1987—February 27, 1988)
- Mother Studio Presents (April 24, 1987—August 2, 1996)
- Agila (September 7, 1987—February 7, 1992)
- News on 4 (October 26, 1987—September 29, 1995)
- Maricel Regal Drama Special (November 17, 1987—March 20, 1989)
- Okay Ka, Fairy Ko! (November 26, 1987—April 3, 1997)
- Eye to Eye (January 11, 1988—August 9, 1996)
- Dance Tonight (March 5, 1988—December 24, 1988)
- Kapag may Katwiran, Ipaglaban Mo! (June 13, 1988—March 7, 1999)
- Martin After Dark (July 30, 1988—November 28, 1998)
- Magandang Gabi... Bayan (August 21, 1988—December 31, 2005)
- PTV Newsbreak (March 13, 1989—March 16, 2020)
- The Maricel Drama Special (March 27, 1989—May 12, 1997)
- Mel & Jay (August 20, 1989—March 31, 1996)
- The Hour Updates (October 9, 1989—September 30, 1994)
- Anna Luna (November 27, 1989—September 29, 1995)
- Bantay Balita (November 27, 1989—September 28, 1990)
- Headline Trese (November 27, 1989—October 31, 1997)
- Sa Linggo nAPO Sila (December 3, 1989—January 29, 1995)

== 1990s ==
- ABS-CBN Sunday TV Mass (April 15, 1990—February 5, 2006)
- Junior Patrol (May 21, 1990—July 26, 1992)
- The Inside Story (July 10, 1990—November 3, 1998)
- Business Today (October 1, 1990—March 29, 1996)
- Teysi ng Tahanan (January 14, 1991—February 21, 1997)
- Abangan ang Susunod Na Kabanata (January 16, 1991—June 17, 1997)
- Kape at Balita (February 11, 1991—August 16, 2013)
- Islands Newsbreak (May 2, 1991—March 6, 1992)
- Maalaala Mo Kaya (May 15, 1991—December 10, 2022)
- GMA Network News (January 6, 1992—July 14, 2002)
- Valiente (February 10, 1992—September 12, 1997)
- Firing Line (February 17, 1992—January 11, 1999)
- Entertainment Today (February 21, 1992—December 27, 1999)
- The Big Night (February 23, 1992—February 16, 2004)
- Balitang Balita (February 24, 1992—April 7, 2004)
- Live on 5 (February 24, 1992—April 11, 2004)
- ABCinema (February 25, 1992—August 8, 2008)
- IBC NewsBreak (March 9, 1992—February 9, 2018)
- IBC News 5:30 Report (March 9, 1992—July 7, 1995)
- IBC News 11 O'Clock Report (March 9, 1992—July 7, 1995)
- GMA's Best (April 27, 1992—November 25, 2002)
- Hoy Gising! (May 4, 1992—March 5, 2001)
- 5 and Up (May 16, 1992—July 14, 2002)
- Battle of the Brains (July 18, 1992—July 14, 2001)
- Showbiz Lingo (August 2, 1992—June 6, 1999)
- Mara Clara (August 17, 1992—February 14, 1997)
- Ober Da Bakod (September 14, 1992—May 27, 1997)
- Gwapings Live! (October 4, 1992—October 10, 1993)
- Ang TV (October 19, 1992—April 11, 1997)
- Home Along Da Riles (December 23, 1992—August 10, 2003)
- Star Drama Presents (February 18, 1993—September 8, 2001)
- SST: Salo-Salo Together (March 20, 1993—June 30, 1995)
- Haybol Rambol (May 10, 1993—October 13, 1995)
- Kate en Boogie (July 19, 1993—November 24, 1994)
- Oki Doki Doc (October 23, 1993—December 2, 2000)
- Brigada Siete (December 5, 1993—September 29, 2001)
- Game Na Game Na! (January 15, 1994—June 8, 1996)
- Tropang Trumpo (March 12, 1994—March 13, 1999)
- IBC Headliners (April 4, 1994—November 19, 2021)
- Mixed N.U.T.S. (Numero Unong Terrific Show!) (May 9, 1994—October 7, 1997)
- ATBP: Awit, Titik at Bilang na Pambata (June 5, 1994—March 29, 1998)
- Show & Tell (July 16, 1994—October 1, 1995)
- Citiline (November 12, 1994—April 10, 1999)
- Rainbow Cinema (November 12, 1994—August 28, 1999)
- 'Sang Linggo nAPO Sila (January 30, 1995—November 28, 1998)
- Cristy FerMinute (January 30, 1995—present)
- Inside Showbiz (February 1, 1995—September 24, 1997)
- Dong Puno Live (February 2, 1995—June 29, 2005)
- ASAP (February 5, 1995—May 10, 2026)
- Sunday Night Special (February 5, 1995—March 31, 1996)
- The 700 Club Asia (February 6, 1995—present)
- PCSO Lottery Draw (March 8, 1995—present)
- Familia Zaragoza (June 11, 1995—September 29, 1996)
- Batang X sa TV (June 27, 1995—February 27, 1996)
- IBC TV X-Press (July 10, 1995—August 15, 1997)
- Kadenang Kristal (July 31, 1995—August 9, 1996)
- Katok Mga Misis (July 31, 1995—June 5, 1998)
- T.G.I.S. (August 12, 1995—November 28, 1999)
- Citynet Morning News (August 28, 1995—March 31, 1999)
- Citynet Noontime/Afternoon News (August 28, 1995—March 31, 1999)
- Citynet Evening News (August 28, 1995—March 31, 1999)
- Citynet Late-Night News (August 28, 1995—March 31, 1999)
- Citynet Television News (September 2, 1995—April 4, 1999)
- Citynet Weekend News (September 2, 1995—April 4, 1999)
- PTV News (October 2, 1995—September 4, 2020)
- Saksi: GMA Headline Balita (October 2, 1995—August 13, 1999)
- Emergency (October 4, 1995—March 6, 2009)
- Startalk (October 8, 1995—September 12, 2015)
- Bayani (October 11, 1995—October 5, 2001)
- Bubble Gang (October 20, 1995—present)
- Villa Quintana (November 6, 1995—January 24, 1997)
- Calvento Files (December 4, 1995—October 2, 1998)
- Sunday Night Specials (April 7, 1996—December 26, 1999)
- Lyra (April 8, 1996—January 3, 1997)
- Friday Box Office (April 12, 1996—February 20, 2004)
- Saturday Night Blockbuster (April 13, 1996—June 27, 1998)
- Tierra Sangre (April 15, 1996—February 12, 1999)
- Mukha ng Buhay (April 15, 1996—January 29, 1999)
- The Kris Aquino Show (April 15, 1996—October 25, 1996)
- Partners Mel and Jay (May 5, 1996—February 8, 2004)
- D.A.T.S. (May 6, 1996—November 8, 1996)
- Usapang Business (May 9, 1996—October 26, 2002)
- Super Games (May 12, 1996—June 29, 1997)
- Eezy Dancing (May 12, 1996—February 3, 2002)
- Balitang K (May 20, 1996—March 2, 2001)
- Wow Mali (May 25, 1996—June 30, 2024)
- ABS-CBN Weekend News (June 1, 1996—December 31, 2005)
- Alas Singko Y Medya (June 3, 1996—August 2, 2002)
- Gimik (June 15, 1996—February 13, 1999)
- Dateline Philippines (July 8, 1996—present)
- Mia Gracia (August 12, 1996—August 15, 1997)
- ETChing: Entertainment Today with Lyn Ching (August 12, 1996—June 6, 1998)
- SNBO: Sunday Night Box Office (August 18, 1996—May 31, 2020)
- News 23 (October 14, 1996—September 11, 1998)
- Anna Karenina (November 10, 1996—April 28, 2002)
- Ms. D! (November 11, 1996—February 26, 1999)
- Flames (November 11, 1996—January 11, 2002)
- Today with Kris Aquino (November 18, 1996—March 9, 2001)
- GoBingo (December 9, 1996—October 10, 2008)
- SOP (February 2, 1997—February 28, 2010)
- Walang Tulugan with the Master Showman (February 8, 1997—February 13, 2016)
- Esperanza (February 17, 1997—July 30, 1999)
- Mula sa Puso (March 10, 1997—April 9, 1999)
- Ikaw na Sana (March 17, 1997—April 3, 1998)
- Good Morning Asia (April 7, 1997—April 8, 1998)
- 1 for 3 (April 10, 1997—June 24, 2001)
- Kaya ni Mister, Kaya ni Misis (May 19, 1997—September 3, 2001)
- Growing Up (June 2, 1997—February 12, 1999)
- Wansapanataym (June 22, 1997—April 14, 2019)
- !Oka Tokat (June 24, 1997—May 7, 2002)
- Pira-pirasong Pangarap (August 18, 1997—February 21, 2003)
- Del Tierro (September 15, 1997—May 14, 1999)
- CTN Midnite (November 3, 1997–July 10, 1998)
- Pinoy Blockbusters (February 9, 1998—October 26, 2002)
- Sing Galing! (March 6, 1998—April 30, 2005)
- Mornings @ GMA (April 13, 1998—December 3, 1999)
- Ganyan Kita Kamahal (April 13, 1998—August 7, 1998)
- S-Files (June 7, 1998—April 22, 2007)
- Brunch with Bing & Michelle (June 8, 1998—February 26, 1999)
- Saturday Night Specials (July 4, 1998—March 29, 2003)
- Knowledge Power (July 5, 1998—February 28, 2004)
- Kasangga Mo ang Langit (July 10, 1998—present)
- IBC Express Balita (July 13, 1998—February 13, 2026)
- IBC Balita Ngayon (July 13, 1998—February 18, 2000)
- Pambansang Balita Ala-Una (August 3, 1998—July 13, 2001)
- Pambansang Balita Ala-Sais (August 3, 1998—July 13, 2001)
- National Network News (August 3, 1998—July 13, 2001)
- News Flash sa 4 (August 3, 1998—July 15, 2001)
- Halik sa Apoy (August 10, 1998—February 26, 1999)
- Diyos at Bayan (August 21, 1998—present)
- Sharon (September 6, 1998—October 3, 2010)
- Martin Late at Nite (September 7, 1998—August 29, 2003)
- Global News (September 7, 1998—September 7, 2001)
- News Central (September 14, 1998—October 1, 2010)
- Kool Ka Lang (October 19, 1998—October 13, 2003)
- The Correspondents (November 10, 1998—October 19, 2010)
- Sa Sandaling Kailangan Mo Ako (November 16, 1998—September 6, 1999)
- Debate with Mare at Pare (November 18, 1998—November 2, 2006)
- Richard Love Lucy (November 22, 1998—March 25, 2001)
- Maynila (November 23, 1998—present)
- MTB (November 30, 1998—February 4, 2005)
- i-Witness (January 18, 1999—present)
- Marinella (February 8, 1999—May 11, 2001)
- Cheche Lazaro Presents (February 14, 1999—June 22, 2014)
- G-mik (February 20, 1999—June 15, 2002)
- Ang Munting Paraiso (March 6, 1999—June 1, 2002)
- Tarajing Potpot (March 6, 1999—June 10, 2000)
- Beh Bote Nga (March 9, 1999—April 23, 2003)
- Mikee Forever (March 10, 1999—September 1, 1999)
- Tabing Ilog (March 14, 1999—October 19, 2003)
- Breakfast (March 15, 1999—June 22, 2007)
- Ispup (March 20, 1999—February 15, 2004)
- Saan Ka Man Naroroon (April 12, 1999—March 23, 2001)
- F! (April 17, 1999—February 26, 2006)
- Di Ba't Ikaw (May 17, 1999—October 29, 1999)
- The Buzz (June 13, 1999—April 5, 2015)
- Alas Dose sa Trese (July 24, 1999—November 3, 2000)
- UltraVision 25 Report (July 27, 1999—May 3, 2000)
- Labs Ko Si Babe (August 2, 1999—November 10, 2000)
- Kirara, Ano ang Kulay ng Pag-ibig? (August 16, 1999—November 2, 2001)
- Pulso: Aksyon Balita (August 16, 1999—November 17, 2000)
- Frontpage: Ulat ni Mel Tiangco (August 16, 1999—March 12, 2004)
- Saksi (August 16, 1999—present)
- Pintados (September 4, 1999—September 2, 2000)
- GMA Love Stories (September 4, 1999—March 1, 2002)
- Pwedeng Pwede (September 8, 1999—October 16, 2001)
- Judy Ann Drama Special (September 13, 1999—September 3, 2001)
- ANC Headlines (October 11, 1999—present)
- Click (December 4, 1999—July 24, 2004)
- Unang Hirit (December 6, 1999—present)

== 2000s ==
- Sunday Night Movies (January 23, 2000—November 18, 2001)
- PBA on Viva TV (February 20, 2000—December 25, 2002)
- Ronda Trese (February 21, 2000—January 4, 2002)
- Saturday Night Movies (March 4, 2000—March 3, 2001)
- Biyaheng Langit (April 8, 2000—present)
- May Bukas Pa (April 24, 2000—May 4, 2001)
- Kiss Muna (April 29, 2000—September 10, 2001)
- H2K: Hati-Hating Kapatid (April 29, 2000—May 26, 2001)
- Good Morning Pilipinas (May 1, 2000—May 5, 2017)
- Planet 25 Report (May 4, 2000—April 27, 2001)
- Kagat ng Dilim (June 10, 2000—February 19, 2022)
- Subic Bay (June 29, 2000—May 30, 2001)
- RPN Arangkada Balita (July 3, 2000—April 14, 2006)
- Primetime Balita (July 3, 2000—August 10, 2001)
- Imbestigador (August 2, 2000—September 9, 2023)
- Kakabakaba (September 9, 2000—May 1, 2004)
- Idol Ko si Kap (September 17, 2000—September 3, 2005)
- Lunch Break (November 4, 2000—December 12, 2003)
- Pangako Sa 'Yo (November 13, 2000—September 20, 2002)
- Who Wants to Be a Millionaire? (November 13, 2000—November 22, 2015)
- ABS-CBN Headlines (November 20, 2000—July 25, 2003)
- Arriba, Arriba! (December 9, 2000—August 9, 2003)
- Larawan: A Special Drama Engagement (February 14, 2001—December 26, 2001)
- Talk TV (March 12, 2001—July 19, 2002)
- Biglang Sibol, Bayang Impasibol (March 12, 2001—January 25, 2002)
- Ikaw Lang ang Mamahalin (March 26, 2001—November 1, 2002)
- Sa Dulo ng Walang Hanggan (March 26, 2001—February 28, 2003)
- New Day @ PTV (April 2, 2001—July 13, 2001)
- Eto Na Ang Susunod Na Kabanata (April 21, 2001—September 9, 2001)
- Recuerdo de Amor (May 14, 2001—January 10, 2003)
- Ang Tamang Daan (June 11, 2001—present)
- Sa Puso Ko, Iingatan Ka (June 18, 2001—February 14, 2003)
- Daddy Di Do Du (July 12, 2001—July 29, 2007)
- Teledyaryo (July 16, 2001—June 29, 2012)
- NBN Network News (July 16, 2001—March 23, 2005)
- NBN News Live (July 16, 2001—April 8, 2007)
- NewsWatch Now (August 13, 2001—March 9, 2007)
- Sis (August 27, 2001—January 1, 2010)
- Whattamen (September 12, 2001—February 18, 2004)
- Attagirl (September 13, 2001—May 7, 2002)
- Game Ka Na Ba? (October 8, 2001—June 18, 2022)
- FPJ Action Cinema (October 22, 2001—May 2, 2003)
- Wheel of Fortune (November 19, 2001—July 25, 2008)
- Family Feud (November 19, 2001—present)
- The Price Is Right (November 25, 2001—August 13, 2011)
- Sana ay Ikaw na Nga (December 3, 2001—April 25, 2003)
- Express Balita (January 7, 2002—August 5, 2011)
- IBC News Tonite (January 7, 2002—June 4, 2004)
- All-Star K! (January 13, 2002—October 18, 2009)
- Star for a Night (March 31, 2002—March 1, 2003)
- Kung Mawawala Ka (April 22, 2002—June 6, 2003)
- Kahit Kailan (May 5, 2002—July 6, 2003)
- OK Fine, 'To ang Gusto Nyo! (May 14, 2002—August 21, 2006)
- Tanging Yaman, The Series (June 8, 2002—March 15, 2003)
- Wish Ko Lang! (June 29, 2002—present)
- Ang Iibigin ay Ikaw (July 8, 2002—April 11, 2003)
- Kay Tagal Kang Hinintay (July 8, 2002—November 14, 2003)
- Flash Report (July 15, 2002—March 27, 2016)
- Flash Report Special Edition (July 20, 2002—June 17, 2007)
- Morning Girls with Kris and Korina (July 22, 2002—May 28, 2004)
- Magandang Umaga, Bayan (August 5, 2002—June 3, 2005)
- Magandang Umaga, Bayan Weekend (August 10, 2002—April 18, 2004)
- Willingly Yours (August 10, 2002—November 1, 2003)
- Bitag (September 14, 2002—present)
- Bituin (September 23, 2002—May 23, 2003)
- Blockbusters Cinema (November 2, 2002—November 1, 2003)
- Habang Kapiling Ka (November 4, 2002—October 17, 2003)
- Bida si Mister, Bida si Misis (November 16, 2002—February 8, 2005)
- Berks (November 16, 2002—March 20, 2004)
- Magpakailanman (December 2, 2002—present)
- PBA on NBN/IBC (February 23, 2003—December 14, 2003)
- Nagmamahal, Manay Gina (February 24, 2003—August 29, 2003)
- Darating ang Umaga (March 3, 2003—November 14, 2003)
- RPN News Update (March 22, 2003—January 4, 2008)
- S2: Showbiz Sabado (March 22, 2003—September 13, 2003)
- Dee's Day (April 10, 2003—December 28, 2007)
- Ang Iibigin ay Ikaw Pa Rin (April 14, 2003—August 22, 2003)
- Nuts Entertainment (April 30, 2003—December 27, 2008)
- Sana'y Wala Nang Wakas (May 19, 2003—July 9, 2004)
- Celebrity DAT Com (May 22, 2003—September 3, 2004)
- Basta't Kasama Kita (May 26, 2003—September 10, 2004)
- Narito ang Puso Ko (June 9, 2003—March 5, 2004)
- Search for a Star (June 21, 2003—March 13, 2004)
- Kidcetera (June 28, 2003—November 29, 2003)
- Love to Love (July 13, 2003—October 22, 2006)
- Hawak Ko ang Langit (July 14, 2003—November 7, 2003)
- ABS-CBN Insider (July 28, 2003—June 30, 2006)
- Daisy Siete (September 1, 2003—July 2, 2010)
- Lagot Ka, Isusumbong Kita (October 20, 2003—April 9, 2007)
- Twin Hearts (October 20, 2003—June 11, 2004)
- All Together Now (October 21, 2003—September 7, 2004)
- Starstruck (October 27, 2003—September 15, 2019)
- Star in a Million (November 8, 2003—August 21, 2004)
- Walang Hanggan (November 10, 2003—February 27, 2004)
- Retro TV (November 17, 2003—February 20, 2004)
- Meteor Fever in Manila (November 17, 2003—December 5, 2003)
- Kay Susan Tayo! (November 30, 2003—October 25, 2009)
- Bio Data (December 2, 2003—September 7, 2004)
- It Might Be You (December 8, 2003—December 10, 2004)
- Te Amo, Maging Sino Ka Man (February 2, 2004—September 17, 2004)
- At Home Ka Dito (February 8, 2004—August 12, 2007)
- TV Patrol Sabado (February 14, 2004—June 26, 2010)
- Partners with Mel Tiangco (February 15, 2004—July 25, 2004)
- PBA on ABC (February 22, 2004—August 20, 2008)
- Marina (February 23, 2004—November 12, 2004)
- Sarah the Teen Princess (March 1, 2004—October 22, 2004)
- Ikaw sa Puso Ko (March 1, 2004—October 1, 2004)
- Star Circle Quest (March 1, 2004—February 19, 2011)
- Wazzup Wazzup (March 1, 2004—July 20, 2007)
- Nginiiig (March 6, 2004—April 8, 2006)
- Lukso ng Dugo (March 7, 2004—May 30, 2004)
- Hanggang Kailan (March 8, 2004—August 13, 2004)
- 24 Oras (March 15, 2004—present)
- Saksi: Liga ng Katotohanan (March 15, 2004—February 18, 2011)
- StarStruck Kids (March 20, 2004—June 26, 2004)
- Mangarap Ka (March 22, 2004—October 8, 2004)
- Lovely Day (April 3, 2004—May 23, 2009)
- Big News (April 12, 2004—August 8, 2008)
- Sentro (April 12, 2004—August 8, 2008)
- Big News Ngayon (April 12, 2004—October 1, 2006)
- Art Angel (April 17, 2004—May 14, 2011)
- Salamat Dok (April 24, 2004—March 15, 2020)
- TV Patrol Linggo (May 9, 2004—June 27, 2010)
- Rated Korina (May 16, 2004—present)
- Chowtime Na! (May 17, 2004—October 6, 2006)
- ASAP Fanatic (May 23, 2004—June 25, 2006)
- Good Morning, Kris (May 31, 2004—October 8, 2004)
- Reporter's Notebook (June 1, 2004—present)
- News Tonight (June 7, 2004—November 6, 2009)
- Headliners (June 7, 2004—November 8, 2009)
- SOP Gigsters (June 13, 2004—October 22, 2006)
- Marinara (June 14, 2004—September 24, 2004)
- EK Channel (June 19, 2004—January 29, 2005)
- Hoy Gising! Kapamilya (June 26, 2004—September 17, 2005)
- 30 Days (June 28, 2004—August 13, 2004)
- Pinoy Pop Superstar (July 3, 2004—June 2, 2007)
- Bitoy's Funniest Videos (July 3, 2004—October 10, 2009)
- Hiram (July 12, 2004—May 20, 2005)
- SCQ Reload (July 12, 2004—June 12, 2005)
- Ito Ang Balita (July 12, 2004—present)
- KNC Show (July 16, 2004—present)
- Chika Mo, Chika Ko (July 17, 2004—July 19, 2008)
- Mel & Joey (August 1, 2004—July 17, 2011)
- Mulawin (August 2, 2004—March 18, 2005)
- Joyride (August 16, 2004—March 11, 2005)
- Born Diva (August 28, 2004—November 13, 2004)
- Wag Kukurap (August 28, 2004—April 29, 2006)
- Out! (September 4, 2004—December 4, 2004)
- Bahay Mo Ba 'To? (September 14, 2004—July 10, 2007)
- Forever in My Heart (September 27, 2004—January 7, 2005)
- D'X-Man (October 11, 2004—September 17, 2023)
- Krystala (October 11, 2004—April 22, 2005)
- Morning Star (October 11, 2004—January 28, 2005)
- Newsbeat (October 11, 2004—August 10, 2007)
- Leya, ang Pinakamagandang Babae sa Ilalim ng Lupa (October 18, 2004—January 28, 2005)
- Kapuso Mo, Jessica Soho (November 7, 2004—present)
- TV Patrol World (November 22, 2004—June 29, 2010)
- Showbiz No. 1 (November 22, 2004—July 1, 2005)
- Spirits (December 13, 2004—May 6, 2005)
- Saang Sulok ng Langit (January 31, 2005—August 12, 2005)
- 'Til Death Do Us Part (January 31, 2005—May 13, 2005)
- Homeboy (January 31, 2005—June 29, 2007)
- M.R.S. (Most Requested Show) (January 31, 2005—July 15, 2005)
- Wowowee (February 5, 2005—July 30, 2010)
- Goin' Bulilit (February 6, 2005—September 27, 2024)
- Bora (February 15, 2005—April 11, 2006)
- StarDance (February 19, 2005—May 21, 2005)
- Quizon Avenue (March 5, 2005—July 22, 2006)
- Search for the Star in a Million (March 13, 2005—January 22, 2006)
- Now and Forever (March 14, 2005—November 24, 2006)
- Kamao: Matirang Matibay (March 14, 2005—May 20, 2005)
- Darna (April 4, 2005—November 25, 2005)
- Pinoy Abroad (April 6, 2005—June 28, 2006)
- Showbiz Stripped (April 16, 2005—February 10, 2007)
- Wow Maling Mali (April 23, 2005—July 22, 2006)
- Encantadia (May 2, 2005—December 9, 2005)
- Bubble Gang Jr. (May 8, 2005—July 10, 2005)
- Mga Anghel na Walang Langit (May 9, 2005—February 24, 2006)
- Ikaw ang Lahat sa Akin (May 16, 2005—November 4, 2005)
- Dokyu (May 18, 2005—August 10, 2007)
- Hollywood Dream (May 22, 2005—November 20, 2005)
- Qpids (May 23, 2005—September 25, 2005)
- My Juan and Only (May 28, 2005—January 28, 2006)
- Magandang Umaga, Pilipinas (June 6, 2005—June 22, 2007)
- Kampanerang Kuba (June 6, 2005—December 16, 2005)
- Club TV (June 11, 2005—November 5, 2005)
- Teledyaryo Sabado (June 25, 2005—April 21, 2007)
- Teledyaryo Linggo (June 26, 2005—April 22, 2007)
- Sugo (July 4, 2005—February 10, 2006)
- Pilipinas, Gising Ka Na Ba? (July 4, 2005—July 20, 2007)
- Ang Mahiwagang Baul (July 17, 2005—January 28, 2007)
- Asenso Pinoy (July 23, 2005—January 7, 2023)
- Kung Mamahalin Mo Lang Ako (August 15, 2005—February 17, 2006)
- Pinoy Big Brother (August 21, 2005—May 29, 2022)
- News Patrol (September 5, 2005—present)
- Makuha Ka sa Tikim (September 10, 2005—November 24, 2006)
- Vietnam Rose (September 19, 2005—February 10, 2006)
- Little Big Star (September 24, 2005—February 3, 2007)
- Hataw Balita (September 26, 2005—October 13, 2017)
- HP: To the Highest Level Na! (October 1, 2005—July 14, 2007)
- Totoo TV (October 31, 2005—October 7, 2011)
- S.O.S.: Stories of Survival (November 3, 2005—August 4, 2008)
- Shall We Dance (November 6, 2005—March 28, 2010)
- Panday (November 7, 2005—May 26, 2006)
- Flash Report sa QTV (November 11, 2005—March 18, 2007)
- Balitanghali (November 11, 2005—present)
- News on Q (November 11, 2005—February 18, 2011)
- Moms (November 11, 2005—January 16, 2009)
- Laugh to Laugh: Ang Kulit! (November 11, 2005—April 28, 2006)
- Day Off (November 12, 2005—May 25, 2019)
- Candies (November 12, 2005—June 17, 2006)
- Ay, Robot! (November 12, 2005—September 8, 2007)
- Ang Pinaka (November 13, 2005—March 15, 2020)
- Pop Star Kids (November 13, 2005—July 29, 2007)
- My Guardian Abby (November 15, 2005—April 25, 2006)
- Reunions (November 15, 2005—February 20, 2011)
- BalikBayan (November 16, 2005—February 18, 2011)
- S.O.C.O.: Scene of the Crime Operatives (November 23, 2005—present)
- H3O: Ha Ha Ha Over (December 5, 2005—August 6, 2007)
- Gulong ng Palad (January 9, 2006—May 12, 2006)
- Komiks (February 4, 2006—August 8, 2009)
- Trip na Trip (February 5, 2006—July 22, 2011)
- The Healing Eucharist (February 12, 2006—present)
- Your Song (February 12, 2006—March 27, 2011)
- Encantadia: Pag-ibig Hanggang Wakas (February 20, 2006—April 28, 2006)
- Agawin Mo Man ang Lahat (February 20, 2006—August 11, 2006)
- Hongkong Flight 143 (February 20, 2006—May 12, 2006)
- Sa Piling Mo (February 27, 2006—August 25, 2006)
- XXX: Exklusibong, Explosibong, Exposé (March 4, 2006—February 18, 2013)
- Us Girls (March 5, 2006—May 26, 2012)
- Gudtaym (March 10, 2006—August 25, 2006)
- Jologs Guide (March 19, 2006—April 9, 2006)
- Majika (March 20, 2006—September 29, 2006)
- Tribe (March 25, 2006—August 3, 2019)
- Hapinas (April 1, 2006—February 1, 2008)
- Urban Zone (April 16, 2006—January 20, 2012)
- PTV Sports (April 17, 2006—present)
- RPN NewsWatch Aksyon Balita (April 17, 2006—January 4, 2008)
- Noel (April 24, 2006—June 30, 2006)
- Kaka at Claire, Kaagapay Niyo (April 24, 2006—October 6, 2006)
- Project 11 (May 1, 2006—September 30, 2006)
- Fantastikids (May 6, 2006—December 9, 2006)
- Bituing Walang Ningning (May 15, 2006—October 6, 2006)
- I Luv NY (May 15, 2006—September 8, 2006)
- Calla Lily (May 29, 2006—September 8, 2006)
- Captain Barbell (May 29, 2006—January 12, 2007)
- Let's Go! (June 3, 2006—May 19, 2007)
- Kapamilya, Deal or No Deal (June 5, 2006—March 4, 2016)
- U Can Dance (June 11, 2006—October 13, 2007)
- Na-Scam Ka Na Ba? (June 20, 2006—October 10, 2006)
- Posh (June 24, 2006—December 23, 2006)
- Pinoy Meets World (June 25, 2006—January 25, 2009)
- First Look (July 3, 2006—October 23, 2015)
- Mornings @ ANC (July 3, 2006—February 24, 2017)
- Bandila (July 3, 2006—March 17, 2020)
- 100% Pinoy! (July 5, 2006—September 25, 2008)
- Aalog-Alog (July 8, 2006—May 5, 2007)
- Love Spell (July 9, 2006—March 23, 2008)
- Ang Pagbabago (July 10, 2006—September 1, 2006)
- John en Shirley (July 29, 2006—October 27, 2007)
- Star Magic Presents (July 29, 2006—May 10, 2008)
- Teka Mona! (July 29, 2006—May 19, 2007)
- Philippine Idol (July 30, 2006—December 10, 2006)
- The Beat (July 31, 2006—February 14, 2011)
- O-Ha! (August 7, 2006—January 26, 2007)
- Games Uplate Live (August 7, 2006—October 2, 2009)
- Pinakamamahal (August 14, 2006—November 3, 2006)
- Swak na Swak (August 21, 2006—September 26, 2021)
- Pinoy Dream Academy (August 27, 2006—October 5, 2008)
- Sunday's Best (August 27, 2006—present)
- Super Inggo (August 28, 2006—February 9, 2007)
- Noypi, Ikaw Ba ‘To? (August 28, 2006—March 17, 2008)
- Crazy for You (September 11, 2006—November 30, 2006)
- Bakekang (September 11, 2006—March 30, 2007)
- Atlantika (October 2, 2006—February 9, 2007)
- ABC News Alert (October 2, 2006—August 8, 2008)
- Maging Sino Ka Man (October 9, 2006—May 25, 2007)
- Kaagapay (October 9, 2006—February 9, 2016)
- Hoooo U? (October 15, 2006—December 3, 2006)
- Makita Ka Lang Muli (November 6, 2006—February 16, 2007)
- Palaban (November 8, 2006—November 14, 2007)
- Asian Treasures (January 15, 2007—June 29, 2007)
- Little Big Superstar (February 10, 2007—May 12, 2007)
- Super Twins (February 12, 2007—June 1, 2007)
- Maria Flordeluna (February 12, 2007—June 22, 2007)
- Sine Totoo (February 17, 2007—February 28, 2009)
- Sineserye Presents (March 5, 2007—October 2, 2009)
- Showbiz Ka! (March 5, 2007—June 1, 2007)
- RPN iWatch News (March 12, 2007—January 11, 2008)
- Philippines' Next Top Model (March 13, 2007—May 30, 2017)
- Flash Report sa Q (March 19, 2007—April 8, 2007)
- The Sweet Life (March 19, 2007—February 18, 2011)
- Here Comes the Bride (March 22, 2007—June 28, 2007)
- Philippine Agenda (March 25, 2007—May 13, 2007)
- Spoon (March 25, 2007—August 9, 2015)
- Minuto (April 9, 2007—August 8, 2010)
- Lupin (April 9, 2007—August 17, 2007)
- Live on Q (April 9, 2007—February 20, 2011)
- One Morning Cafe (April 9, 2007—June 29, 2010)
- Radyo Patrol Balita Alas-Kuwatro (April 12, 2007—present)
- Radyo Patrol Balita Alas-Siyete (April 12, 2007—present)
- Todo-Todo Walang Preno (April 12, 2007—August 28, 2020)
- Usapang de Campanilla (April 12, 2007—March 18, 2020)
- A.M.Y. (About Me and You) (April 12, 2007—May 14, 2010)
- Fantastic Man (April 14, 2007—November 10, 2007)
- Radyo Patrol Balita Alas-Kuwatro Weekend (April 14, 2007—March 15, 2020)
- Magandang Morning (April 14, 2007—August 23, 2020)
- Radyo Patrol Balita Alas-Siyete Weekend (April 14, 2007—present)
- Para sa 'Yo Bayan (April 14, 2007—June 26, 2010)
- Konsyumer, Atbp. (April 14, 2007—October 3, 2020)
- Magpayo Nga Kayo (April 14, 2007—August 22, 2020)
- Pintig Balita (April 15, 2007—March 15, 2020)
- Sagot Ko 'Yan! (April 15, 2007—October 3, 2021)
- SikaPinoy (April 15, 2007—April 7, 2013)
- Rounin (April 16, 2007—July 26, 2007)
- Who's Your Daddy Now? (April 16, 2007—July 13, 2007)
- Walang Kapalit (April 23, 2007—August 31, 2007)
- Showbiz Central (April 29, 2007—July 29, 2012)
- Sine Novela (April 30, 2007—October 22, 2010)
- Wow Mali Bytes (May 26, 2007—July 28, 2007)
- Tok! Tok! Tok! Isang Milyon Pasok (May 27, 2007—November 2, 2008)
- Gokada Go! (June 2, 2007—July 28, 2007)
- Abt Ur Luv (June 2, 2007—January 5, 2008)
- Impostora (June 4, 2007—September 21, 2007)
- Mommy Elvie's Problematic Show (June 19, 2007—August 5, 2008)
- GMA Weekend Report (June 23, 2007—February 20, 2010)
- Boys Nxt Door (June 24, 2007—January 13, 2008)
- Umagang Kay Ganda (June 25, 2007—May 5, 2020)
- Ysabella (June 25, 2007—January 18, 2008)
- Mga Mata ni Anghelita (July 2, 2007—October 5, 2007)
- Boy & Kris (July 2, 2007—February 13, 2009)
- Good Morning Kuya (July 23, 2007—present)
- Hataw Balita News Update (July 23, 2007—January 6, 2012)
- Hataw Balita Primetime (July 23, 2007—August 31, 2007)
- That's My Doc (July 29, 2007—October 4, 2008)
- Margarita (July 30, 2007—September 21, 2007)
- Entertainment Live (August 4, 2007—January 28, 2012)
- Wow Mali Express (August 4, 2007—August 2, 2008)
- Ful Haus (August 5, 2007—August 16, 2009)
- Kokey (August 6, 2007—November 9, 2007)
- Celebrity Duets (August 11, 2007—November 14, 2009)
- i-Balita (August 13, 2007—October 21, 2011)
- Marimar (August 13, 2007—March 14, 2008)
- Kap's Amazing Stories (August 19, 2007—July 6, 2014)
- 1 vs. 100 (August 25, 2007—April 19, 2008)
- Kabarkada, Break the Bank (August 27, 2007—December 28, 2007)
- Pangarap na Bituin (September 3, 2007—December 7, 2007)
- Pinoy Vibes (September 9, 2007—March 15, 2020)
- Private Nights (September 9, 2007—March 15, 2020)
- Zaido: Pulis Pangkalawakan (September 24, 2007—February 8, 2008)
- Lastikman (September 24, 2007—January 25, 2008)
- Prinsesa ng Banyera (October 8, 2007—May 23, 2008)
- Kakasa Ka Ba sa Grade 5? (October 27, 2007—May 9, 2009)
- Super Inggo 1.5: Ang Bagong Bangis (November 3, 2007—December 15, 2007)
- Princess Sarah (November 12, 2007—December 21, 2007)
- Kamandag (November 19, 2007—April 25, 2008)
- Born to Be Wild (November 28, 2007—present)
- Pinoy Records (December 8, 2007—July 17, 2010)
- Maging Sino Ka Man: Ang Pagbabalik (December 10, 2007—March 28, 2008)
- Astigs (January 12, 2008—May 10, 2008)
- Volta (January 26, 2008—March 15, 2008)
- Kung Fu Kids (January 28, 2008—April 25, 2008)
- Lobo (January 28, 2008—July 11, 2008)
- Palos (January 28, 2008—April 25, 2008)
- E.S.P. (February 7, 2008—May 8, 2008)
- Joaquin Bordado (February 11, 2008—July 11, 2008)
- Gaby's Xtraordinary Files (March 23, 2008—June 8, 2008)
- Babangon Ako't Dudurugin Kita (March 24, 2008—June 27, 2008)
- Matanglawin (March 24, 2008—May 3, 2020)
- I Am KC (March 29, 2008—April 19, 2008)
- Pinoy Idol (April 5, 2008—August 17, 2008)
- Tasya Fantasya (April 6, 2008—July 13, 2008)
- Batingaw (April 7, 2008—August 6, 2010)
- Jollitown (April 13, 2008—October 12, 2013)
- The Singing Bee (April 21, 2008—February 6, 2015)
- Quickfire (May 5, 2008—June 29, 2012)
- Ligaw Na Bulaklak (May 26, 2008—October 24, 2008)
- My Girl (May 26, 2008—September 5, 2008)
- Bakbakan (June 15, 2008—May 31, 2009)
- Ako si Kim Samsoon (June 30, 2008—October 10, 2008)
- That's My Job (July 5, 2008—August 8, 2008)
- Wonder Mom (July 5, 2008—October 24, 2009)
- Iisa Pa Lamang (July 14, 2008—November 7, 2008)
- Codename: Asero (July 14, 2008—November 14, 2008)
- Dear Friend (July 20, 2008—May 16, 2010)
- Bread N' Butter (July 23, 2008—July 12, 2016)
- Project Runway Philippines (July 30, 2008—September 20, 2015)
- Ka-Blog! (August 9, 2008—October 2, 2010)
- The Word Exposed (August 10, 2008—present)
- Dyosa (August 11, 2008—January 16, 2009)
- Juicy! (August 11, 2008—August 3, 2012)
- Midnight DJ (August 11, 2008—May 14, 2011)
- TEN: The Evening News (August 11, 2008—March 31, 2010)
- i-News (August 11, 2008—October 21, 2011)
- Ogags (August 13, 2008—March 31, 2010)
- Rakista (August 14, 2008—November 20, 2008)
- Obra (August 14, 2008—November 27, 2008)
- Lokomoko (August 15, 2008—September 1, 2013)
- Batang X: The Next Generation (August 15, 2008—November 14, 2008)
- Lipgloss (August 16, 2008—August 2009)
- Talentadong Pinoy (August 16, 2008—March 13, 2021)
- Ripley's Believe It or Not! (August 18, 2008—September 22, 2010)
- World Records (August 19, 2008—November 25, 2008)
- Masquerade (August 20, 2008—March 11, 2009)
- Philippines Scariest Challenge (August 22, 2008—September 3, 2009)
- I Love Betty La Fea (September 8, 2008—April 24, 2009)
- Kahit Isang Saglit (September 15, 2008—December 12, 2008)
- Survivor Philippines (September 15, 2008—February 19, 2012)
- Kalye, Mga Kwento ng Lansangan (September 22, 2008—October 5, 2009)
- DoQmentaries (September 27, 2008—December 6, 2009)
- Case Unclosed (October 2, 2008—February 25, 2010)
- PBA on Solar Sports (October 4, 2008—August 21, 2011)
- True Confections (October 4, 2008—August 31, 2010)
- Banana Sundae (October 11, 2008—April 5, 2020)
- LaLola (October 13, 2008—February 6, 2009)
- Gagambino (October 20, 2008—February 20, 2009)
- Pieta (October 27, 2008—May 1, 2009)
- Counterpoint with Secretary Salvador Panelo (October 29, 2008—present)
- Pinoy Fear Factor (November 10, 2008—February 20, 2009)
- Luna Mystika (November 17, 2008—March 6, 2009)
- Everybody Hapi (November 23, 2008—September 4, 2010)
- Ha Ha Hayop (November 24, 2008—August 31, 2009)
- Kiddie Kwela (November 25, 2008—March 30, 2010)
- Rescue Mission (November 27, 2008—February 5, 2009)
- Eva Fonda (December 1, 2008—February 6, 2009)
- Parekoy (January 5, 2009—April 17, 2009)
- Tayong Dalawa (January 19, 2009—September 25, 2009)
- May Bukas Pa (February 2, 2009—February 5, 2010)
- Ang Babaeng Hinugot sa Aking Tadyang (February 2, 2009—May 1, 2009)
- Ruffa & Ai (February 16, 2009—October 23, 2009)
- SNN: Showbiz News Ngayon (February 16, 2009—September 9, 2011)
- Totoy Bato (February 23, 2009—July 3, 2009)
- All About Eve (March 9, 2009—June 5, 2009)
- OFW Diaries (March 13, 2009—January 14, 2011)
- Cool Center (March 14, 2009—April 17, 2010)
- I Survived: Hindi Sumusuko Ang Pinoy (March 19, 2009—December 2, 2010)
- Zorro (March 23, 2009—August 7, 2009)
- SRO Cinemaserye (March 26, 2009—April 8, 2010)
- Pinoy Bingo Night (March 30, 2009—June 26, 2009)
- Hole in the Wall (April 20, 2009—November 27, 2010)
- Kambal sa Uma (April 20, 2009—October 9, 2009)
- Teledyaryo Weekend (April 25, 2009—July 1, 2012)
- Only You (April 27, 2009—August 21, 2009)
- Precious Hearts Romances Presents (May 4, 2009—September 27, 2019)
- Power of 10 (May 10, 2009—December 27, 2009)
- Are You the Next Big Star? (May 16, 2009—August 23, 2009)
- Happy Land (June 6, 2009—March 27, 2010)
- Adik Sa'Yo (June 8, 2009—September 11, 2009)
- All My Life (June 29, 2009—September 18, 2009)
- The Wedding (June 29, 2009—September 4, 2009)
- Rosalinda (July 6, 2009—November 27, 2009)
- Darna (August 10, 2009—February 19, 2010)
- Agimat: Ang Mga Alamat ni Ramon Revilla (August 15, 2009—March 18, 2011)
- Show Me Da Manny (August 23, 2009—July 10, 2011)
- Katorse (August 24, 2009—January 8, 2010)
- Dahil May Isang Ikaw (August 24, 2009—January 15, 2010)
- Stairway to Heaven (September 14, 2009—December 11, 2009)
- Ikaw Sana (September 21, 2009—February 5, 2010)
- Lovers in Paris (September 28, 2009—December 11, 2009)
- Nagsimula sa Puso (October 12, 2009—January 22, 2010)
- Bitoy's Showwwtime (October 17, 2009—March 13, 2010)
- Failon Ngayon (October 24, 2009—May 2, 2020)
- It's Showtime (October 24, 2009—present)
- BandaOke! Rock 'N Roll to Millions (October 25, 2009—March 21, 2010)
- Kulilits (October 31, 2009—September 18, 2010)
- IBC News Tonight (November 9, 2009—August 5, 2011)
- Full House (November 30, 2009—February 26, 2010)
- The Bottomline with Boy Abunda (November 28, 2009—May 2, 2020)
- RPN NewsCap (November 30, 2009—October 29, 2012)
- Sana Ngayong Pasko (December 7, 2009—January 8, 2010)
- Tweetbiz Insiders (December 7, 2009—June 3, 2011)
- Tropang Potchi (December 19, 2009—February 14, 2015)

== 2010s ==
- Misteryo (January 10, 2010—July 9, 2011)
- Tanging Yaman (January 11, 2010—May 21, 2010)
- The Last Prince (January 11, 2010—June 25, 2010)
- True Stories (January 17, 2010—January 23, 2011)
- Kung Tayo'y Magkakalayo (January 18, 2010—July 9, 2010)
- Laff En Roll (January 19, 2010—September 23, 2010)
- Magkano ang Iyong Dangal? (January 25, 2010—May 14, 2010)
- Habang May Buhay (February 1, 2010—May 14, 2010)
- Balitanghali Weekend (February 6, 2010—March 15, 2020)
- Diz Iz It! (February 8, 2010—July 24, 2010)
- First Time (February 8, 2010—May 28, 2010)
- Agua Bendita (February 8, 2010—September 3, 2010)
- Q-Lets and Co. (February 14, 2010—May 9, 2010)
- Rubi (February 15, 2010—August 13, 2010)
- 24 Oras Weekend (February 21, 2010—present)
- Melason (February 22, 2010—March 31, 2010)
- Panday Kids (February 22, 2010—June 4, 2010)
- Headstart with Karen Davila (March 1, 2010—present)
- Kroko: Takas sa Zoo (March 1, 2010—June 18, 2010)
- Diva (March 1, 2010—July 30, 2010)
- Kandidato (March 3, 2010—May 2, 2013)
- Family Matters (March 13, 2010—December 31, 2016)
- Tutok Tulfo (March 13, 2010—August 4, 2012)
- USI: Under Special Investigation (March 14, 2010—August 5, 2012)
- Wipeout! Matira Ang Matibay (March 15, 2010—September 21, 2010)
- Music Uplate Live (March 15, 2010—September 2, 2011)
- Face to Face (March 22, 2010—October 11, 2013)
- Party Pilipinas (March 28, 2010—May 19, 2013)
- Pepito Manaloto (March 28, 2010—present)
- Aha! (April 4, 2010—February 16, 2025)
- My Darwing Aswang (April 4, 2010—May 15, 2011)
- Pidol's Wonderland (April 4, 2010—September 8, 2013)
- Sapul! (April 5, 2010—October 22, 2010)
- Aksyon Ngayon (April 5, 2010—October 24, 2010)
- Aksyon (April 5, 2010—March 13, 2020)
- Tonight with Arnold Clavio (April 5, 2010—March 11, 2020)
- Journo (April 6, 2010—July 31, 2012)
- Dokumentado (April 7, 2010—August 31, 2011)
- X-Life (April 7, 2010—February 16, 2011)
- Claudine (April 10, 2010—August 7, 2010)
- Sunnyville (April 10, 2010—November 13, 2010)
- Aksyon Weekend (April 10, 2010—July 12, 2014)
- BFGF (April 11, 2010—January 30, 2011)
- P.O.5 (April 11, 2010—February 20, 2011)
- Paparazzi (April 11, 2010—July 28, 2012)
- Wachamakulit (April 16, 2010—September 24, 2010)
- Comedy Bar (April 24, 2010—October 29, 2011)
- I Laugh Sabado (April 24, 2010—February 26, 2011)
- Take Me Out (April 26, 2010—July 2, 2010)
- Fastbreak News (May 10, 2010—August 24, 2012)
- Rescue (May 13, 2010—February 14, 2013)
- Rosalka (May 17, 2010—October 22, 2010)
- Love Bug (May 23, 2010—September 19, 2010)
- Simply KC (May 24, 2010—October 22, 2010)
- Momay (May 24, 2010—September 17, 2010)
- Langit sa Piling Mo (May 31, 2010—September 17, 2010)
- Pilyang Kerubin (June 7, 2010—August 27, 2010)
- Pinoy M.D. (June 12, 2010—present)
- Trudis Liit (June 21, 2010—October 22, 2010)
- Endless Love (June 28, 2010—October 15, 2010)
- Magkaribal (June 28, 2010—November 5, 2010)
- Panahon Ko 'to!: Ang Game Show ng Buhay Ko (June 28, 2010—November 26, 2010)
- Twist and Shout (July 3, 2010—October 16, 2010)
- M3: Malay Mo Ma-develop (July 3, 2010—November 27, 2010)
- TV Patrol Weekend (July 3, 2010—present)
- Get It Straight with Daniel Razon (July 5, 2010—September 15, 2023)
- Danz Showdown (July 5, 2010—October 1, 2010)
- Noah (July 12, 2010—February 4, 2011)
- Kaya ng Powers (July 24, 2010—November 13, 2010)
- Pilipinas Win Na Win (July 31, 2010—December 31, 2010)
- Kapamilya Blockbusters (August 2, 2010—June 26, 2026)
- Ilumina (August 2, 2010—November 19, 2010)
- Love ni Mister, Love ni Misis (August 9, 2010—March 4, 2011)
- Teledyaryo News Bulletin (August 9, 2010—July 1, 2012)
- JejeMom (August 14, 2010—November 13, 2010)
- Anatomy of a Disaster (August 22, 2010—November 6, 2011)
- Ang Yaman ni Lola (August 23, 2010—January 21, 2011)
- 1DOL (September 6, 2010—October 22, 2010)
- Wow Meganon (September 6, 2010—April 8, 2011)
- Lady Dada (September 8, 2010—October 6, 2010)
- Alagang Kapatid (September 11, 2010—October 10, 2020)
- Star Factor (September 12, 2010—December 5, 2010)
- Grazilda (September 13, 2010—January 7, 2011)
- Asar Talo Lahat Panalo! (September 18, 2010—November 20, 2010)
- Kokey at Ako (September 20, 2010—December 3, 2010)
- Bantatay (September 20, 2010—February 25, 2011)
- Reel Love Presents Tween Hearts (September 26, 2010—June 10, 2012)
- Imortal (October 4, 2010—April 29, 2011)
- Iba-Balita (October 4, 2010—January 16, 2014)
- Star Power (October 10, 2010—February 20, 2011)
- Koreana (October 11, 2010—February 25, 2011)
- Beauty Queen (October 18, 2010—February 4, 2011)
- Wil Time Bigtime (October 23, 2010—January 5, 2013)
- Sapul sa Singko (October 25, 2010—February 3, 2012)
- Aksyon JournalisMO (October 25, 2010—February 17, 2012)
- Little Star (October 25, 2010—February 11, 2011)
- Juanita Banana (October 25, 2010—February 18, 2011)
- Aksyon Alert (October 25, 2010—August 13, 2017)
- Mara Clara (October 25, 2010—June 3, 2011)
- My Driver Sweet Lover (October 25, 2010—February 4, 2011)
- Patrol ng Pilipino (October 26, 2010—February 19, 2013)
- Aksyon Sabado (October 30, 2010—August 4, 2012)
- Aksyon Linggo (October 31, 2010—August 5, 2012)
- Balitaang Tapat (November 1, 2010—May 11, 2012)
- Hanep Buhay (November 20, 2010—November 26, 2011)
- Extra Express (November 25, 2010—June 2, 2011)
- Shoutout! (November 29, 2010—February 11, 2011)
- Jillian: Namamasko Po (November 29, 2010—January 21, 2011)
- Laugh Out Loud (December 4, 2010—June 18, 2011)
- Sabel (December 6, 2010—March 11, 2011)
- Puso ng Pasko: Artista Challenge (December 6, 2010—December 31, 2010)
- Krusada (December 9, 2010—February 21, 2013)
- Dwarfina (January 10, 2011—May 6, 2011)
- Tunay na Buhay (January 21, 2011—January 12, 2022)
- Wanted (January 28, 2011—July 30, 2012)
- Mutya (January 31, 2011—May 6, 2011)
- Babaeng Hampaslupa (February 7, 2011—July 15, 2011)
- I Heart You, Pare (February 7, 2011—May 27, 2011)
- Happy Yipee Yehey! (February 12, 2011—February 4, 2012)
- Andar ng mga Balita (February 21, 2011—July 11, 2014)
- Fan*tastik (February 27, 2011—May 22, 2011)
- Brigada (February 28, 2011—March 16, 2024)
- Dobol B TV (February 28, 2011—present)
- iJuander (February 28, 2011—present)
- In the Limelight (February 28, 2011—October 7, 2011)
- Magic Palayok (February 28, 2011—July 1, 2011)
- My Lover, My Wife (February 28, 2011—May 27, 2011)
- News to Go (February 28, 2011—May 31, 2019)
- News Live (February 28, 2011—March 26, 2023)
- On Call: Serbisyong Totoo. Ngayon. (February 28, 2011—May 30, 2012)
- CNN Konek (February 28, 2011—August 30, 2013)
- Bilis Balita (February 28, 2011—January 16, 2014)
- Dream Home (February 28, 2011—April 29, 2016)
- State of the Nation (February 28, 2011—present)
- Best Men (March 1, 2011—December 30, 2013)
- Pop Talk (March 1, 2011—October 5, 2021)
- Bawal ang Pasaway kay Mareng Winnie (March 2, 2011—March 17, 2020)
- Fashbook (March 2, 2011—February 12, 2014)
- Investigative Documentaries (March 3, 2011—March 12, 2020)
- May Tamang Balita (March 4, 2011—February 7, 2013)
- Balita Pilipinas Primetime (March 5, 2011—February 15, 2014)
- Weekend Getaway (March 5, 2011—January 25, 2013)
- Good News Kasama si Vicky Morales (March 6, 2011—present)
- Reel Time (March 6, 2011—March 13, 2020)
- Iba-Balita Ngayon (March 7, 2011—August 3, 2012)
- Minsan Lang Kita Iibigin (March 7, 2011—August 19, 2011)
- Mga Nagbabagang Bulaklak (March 21, 2011—June 17, 2011)
- Spooky Nights (March 26, 2011—April 28, 2012)
- Captain Barbell (March 28, 2011—July 29, 2011)
- Mula sa Puso (March 28, 2011—August 12, 2011)
- Good Vibes (April 3, 2011—August 28, 2011)
- Kitchen Superstar (April 4, 2011—July 1, 2011)
- Star Box (April 4, 2011—May 13, 2011)
- Amazing Cooking Kids (April 16, 2011—July 16, 2011)
- Mind Master (April 30, 2011—July 24, 2011)
- News Light (May 2, 2011—November 29, 2019)
- 100 Days to Heaven (May 9, 2011—November 18, 2011)
- Munting Heredera (May 9, 2011—February 3, 2012)
- My Chubby World (May 14, 2011—August 4, 2012)
- Bagets: Just Got Lucky (May 15, 2011—February 12, 2012)
- Blusang Itim (May 16, 2011—August 12, 2011)
- Sabadabadog! (May 21, 2011—November 19, 2011)
- Gandang Gabi, Vice! (May 22, 2011—March 8, 2020)
- Andres de Saya (May 28, 2011—August 21, 2011)
- Amaya (May 30, 2011—January 13, 2012)
- The Biggest Loser Pinoy Edition (May 30, 2011—April 26, 2014)
- Sisid (May 30, 2011—September 16, 2011)
- Guns and Roses (June 6, 2011—September 23, 2011)
- Sinner or Saint (June 13, 2011—October 7, 2011)
- Hey It's Saberdey! (June 18, 2011—February 4, 2012)
- Kris TV (June 27, 2011—April 15, 2016)
- Idol sa Kusina (July 3, 2011—December 20, 2020)
- Futbolilits (July 4, 2011—October 14, 2011)
- Follow That Star (July 9, 2011—February 15, 2014)
- Balita Pilipinas Ngayon (July 11, 2011—May 31, 2019)
- I Dare You (July 11, 2011—December 28, 2013)
- Reputasyon (July 11, 2011—January 20, 2012)
- Motorcycle Diaries (July 15, 2011—March 16, 2017)
- Manny Many Prizes (July 16, 2011—December 2, 2012)
- Rod Santiago's The Sisters (July 18, 2011—September 9, 2011)
- Personalan (July 25, 2011—October 18, 2013)
- News TV Quick Response Team (August 1, 2011—January 15, 2021)
- Time of My Life (August 1, 2011—November 18, 2011)
- News Team 13 (August 8, 2011—February 11, 2019)
- Mondo Manu (August 8, 2011—July 8, 2014)
- Pahiram ng Isang Ina (August 15, 2011—November 11, 2011)
- Maria la del Barrio (August 15, 2011—March 2, 2012)
- My Binondo Girl (August 22, 2011—January 20, 2012)
- Junior MasterChef Pinoy Edition (August 27, 2011—February 18, 2012)
- Iglot (August 29, 2011—November 11, 2011)
- Growing Up (September 4, 2011—February 12, 2012)
- Protégé (September 4, 2011—October 21, 2012)
- Kumare Klub (September 5, 2011—February 3, 2012)
- T3: Alliance (September 5, 2011—April 30, 2016)
- Anggulo (September 7, 2011—August 1, 2012)
- Buhay OFW (September 10, 2011—March 30, 2019)
- Nasaan Ka, Elisa? (September 12, 2011—January 13, 2012)
- Ang Utol Kong Hoodlum (September 12, 2011—November 18, 2011)
- Pinoy Explorer (September 18, 2011—March 15, 2014)
- Kung Aagawin Mo ang Langit (September 19, 2011—February 3, 2012)
- PBA on One Sports (October 2, 2011—present)
- Sa Ngalan ng Ina (October 3, 2011—November 4, 2011)
- Ako Ang Simula (October 8, 2011—February 20, 2013)
- Primetime on ANC (October 10, 2011—January 9, 2015)
- Ikaw Lang ang Mamahalin (October 10, 2011—February 10, 2012)
- Budoy (October 10, 2011—March 9, 2012)
- Daldalita (October 17, 2011—February 3, 2012)
- Etcetera (October 23, 2011—December 3, 2015)
- Sanib Puwersa (October 23, 2011—November 13, 2011)
- Pambansang Almusal (October 24, 2011—August 27, 2021)
- Mata ng Agila (October 24, 2011—present)
- Eagle News International (October 24, 2011—April 1, 2022)
- Real Confessions (November 5, 2011—February 11, 2012)
- Regal Shocker (November 5, 2011—April 28, 2012)
- The Jose and Wally Show Starring Vic Sotto (November 5, 2011—September 8, 2012)
- Toda Max (November 5, 2011—November 16, 2013)
- Glamorosa (November 7, 2011—February 10, 2012)
- Responde (November 7, 2011—present)
- Kokak (November 14, 2011—March 2, 2012)
- Angelito: Batang Ama (November 14, 2011—April 13, 2012)
- Ikaw ay Pag-Ibig (November 21, 2011—January 27, 2012)
- P. S. I Love You (November 21, 2011—February 17, 2012)
- Crime Klasik (December 2, 2011—January 30, 2013)
- Chef Boy Logro: Kusina Master (January 2, 2012—May 9, 2014)
- Hataw Balita Newsbreak (January 9, 2012—July 15, 2016)
- Legacy (January 16, 2012—June 1, 2012)
- Walang Hanggan (January 16, 2012—October 26, 2012)
- 5 Girls and a Dad (January 23, 2012—August 24, 2012)
- iBilib (January 29, 2012—present)
- Mundo Man ay Magunaw (January 30, 2012—July 13, 2012)
- E-Boy (January 30, 2012—April 13, 2012)
- Insider (February 2, 2012—August 2, 2012)
- Oka2kat (February 4, 2012—May 5, 2012)
- Spooky Valentine (February 4, 2012—February 25, 2012)
- Showbiz Inside Report (February 4, 2012—September 28, 2013)
- Good Morning Club (February 6, 2012—July 18, 2014)
- Broken Vow (February 6, 2012—June 15, 2012)
- Alice Bungisngis and Her Wonder Walis (February 6, 2012—June 8, 2012)
- Biritera (February 6, 2012—May 18, 2012)
- The Biggest Game Show in the World Asia (February 12, 2012—May 13, 2012)
- Toink (February 12, 2012—May 13, 2012)
- The Good Daughter (February 13, 2012—June 1, 2012)
- My Beloved (February 13, 2012—June 8, 2012)
- Valiente (February 13, 2012—June 29, 2012)
- Kapitan Awesome (February 19, 2012—May 5, 2013)
- Luv U (February 19, 2012—January 17, 2016)
- Nandito Ako (February 20, 2012—March 23, 2012)
- Pilipinas News (February 20, 2012—July 18, 2014)
- Sarah G. Live (February 26, 2012—February 10, 2013)
- Felina: Prinsesa ng mga Pusa (February 27, 2012—May 25, 2012)
- Isang Dakot Na Luha (February 27, 2012—June 15, 2012)
- Updates (March 1, 2012—January 28, 2024)
- Hiram na Puso (March 5, 2012—July 6, 2012)
- Wako Wako (March 5, 2012—May 25, 2012)
- Dahil sa Pag-ibig (March 12, 2012—June 29, 2012)
- Sunday Funday (April 8, 2012—June 10, 2012)
- Extreme Makeover: Home Edition Philippines (April 15, 2012—June 17, 2012)
- Kung Ako'y Iiwan Mo (April 16, 2012—November 16, 2012)
- Princess and I (April 16, 2012—February 1, 2013)
- Cooking Kumares (April 23, 2012—June 29, 2012)
- Tweets for My Sweet (May 6, 2012—August 19, 2012)
- Aryana (May 7, 2012—January 25, 2013)
- Pinoy Adventures (May 13, 2012—September 29, 2012)
- Sharon: Kasama Mo, Kapatid (May 14, 2012—January 4, 2013)
- Pare & Pare (May 20, 2012—August 12, 2012)
- Luna Blanca (May 21, 2012—October 26, 2012)
- Cooking with the Stars (May 28, 2012—August 3, 2012)
- Kasalanan Bang Ibigin Ka? (June 4, 2012—August 31, 2012)
- Makapiling Kang Muli (June 4, 2012—September 7, 2012)
- Mars (June 11, 2012—July 1, 2022)
- One True Love (June 11, 2012—October 5, 2012)
- @ANCAlerts (June 11, 2012—March 29, 2019)
- Game 'N Go (June 17, 2012—February 3, 2013)
- Together Forever (June 17, 2012—September 9, 2012)
- Faithfully (June 18, 2012—October 5, 2012)
- CNN Philippines Network News (June 18, 2012—March 26, 2017)
- The X Factor Philippines (June 23, 2012—October 14, 2012)
- Mata ng Agila Weekend (June 30, 2012—present)
- Metro One (July 2, 2012—January 4, 2013)
- News @ 1 (July 2, 2012—July 8, 2016)
- News @ 6 (July 2, 2012—July 9, 2016)
- NewsLife (July 2, 2012—July 8, 2016)
- The Weekend News (July 7, 2012—July 10, 2016)
- Be Careful with My Heart (July 9, 2012—November 28, 2014)
- Hindi Ka na Mag-iisa (July 9, 2012—October 26, 2012)
- Kahit Puso'y Masugatan (July 9, 2012—February 1, 2013)
- Angelito: Ang Bagong Yugto (July 16, 2012—December 14, 2012)
- CNN Philippines Nightly News (July 16, 2012—February 12, 2016)
- Third Eye (July 29, 2012—October 21, 2012)
- Enchanted Garden (July 30, 2012—January 4, 2013)
- Artista Academy (July 30, 2012—October 27, 2012)
- Ang Latest (August 4, 2012—July 19, 2013)
- H.O.T. TV: Hindi Ordinaryong Tsismis (August 5, 2012—April 28, 2013)
- Pilipinas News Weekend (August 11, 2012—July 13, 2014)
- Reaksyon (August 13, 2012—November 3, 2017)
- UNTV News (August 27, 2012—July 15, 2016)
- Sana ay Ikaw na Nga (September 3, 2012—February 8, 2013)
- Panahon.TV (September 10, 2012—September 11, 2023)
- Aso ni San Roque (September 10, 2012—January 11, 2013)
- ETC HQ (September 16, 2012—July 3, 2013)
- Hamon ng Kalikasan (September 20, 2012—December 13, 2012)
- Daybreak (October 1, 2012—March 13, 2015)
- Newsday (October 1, 2012—March 13, 2015)
- Sarap, 'Di Ba? (October 6, 2012—September 28, 2024)
- Magdalena (October 8, 2012—January 18, 2013)
- Ina, Kapatid, Anak (October 8, 2012—June 14, 2013)
- Coffee Prince (October 8, 2012—November 23, 2012)
- Cielo de Angelina (October 22, 2012—January 4, 2013)
- Taste Buddies (October 27, 2012—June 26, 2022)
- Yesterday's Bride (October 29, 2012—February 22, 2013)
- Temptation of Wife (October 29, 2012—April 5, 2013)
- A Beautiful Affair (October 29, 2012—January 18, 2013)
- The Amazing Race Philippines (October 29, 2012—December 7, 2014)
- Paroa: Ang Kuwento ni Mariposa (November 5, 2012—March 1, 2013)
- Kapag nasa Katwiran, Ipaglaban Mo! (November 10, 2012—June 16, 2013)
- Nay-1-1 (November 12, 2012—December 28, 2012)
- MasterChef Pinoy Edition (November 12, 2012—February 9, 2013)
- Celebrity Bluff (November 17, 2012—June 30, 2018)
- Watta Job (November 17, 2012—February 16, 2013)
- Pahiram ng Sandali (November 26, 2012—March 15, 2013)
- Legal Help Desk (November 26, 2012—February 2, 2016)
- MedTalk Health Talk (November 27, 2012—January 23, 2024)
- News.PH (November 28, 2012—September 2, 2022)
- News Café (November 30, 2012—March 12, 2015)
- Pinoy True Stories (December 3, 2012—May 4, 2020)
- Teen Gen (December 16, 2012—June 30, 2013)
- Letters & Music (December 17, 2012—present)
- Taumbahay (December 17, 2012—February 15, 2019)
- Balitaan (January 7, 2013—August 29, 2014)
- Jeepney Jackpot: Pera o Para! (January 7, 2013—April 5, 2013)
- Kidlat (January 7, 2013—May 3, 2013)
- Piskante ng Bayan (January 7, 2013—October 8, 2021)
- Sa Ganang Mamamayan (January 7, 2013—present)
- Good Morning Boss (January 14, 2013—July 8, 2016)
- Minute to Win It (January 14, 2013—September 6, 2019)
- Indio (January 14, 2013—May 31, 2013)
- The Alabang Housewives (January 14, 2013—February 8, 2013)
- Kailangan Ko'y Ikaw (January 21, 2013—April 19, 2013)
- May Isang Pangarap (January 21, 2013—May 17, 2013)
- Forever (January 21, 2013—April 19, 2013)
- Wowowillie (January 26, 2013—October 12, 2013)
- Born Impact: Born to Be Wild Weekend Edition (January 27, 2013—February 1, 2014)
- Kahit Konting Pagtingin (January 28, 2013—April 12, 2013)
- Cebuano News (January 28, 2013—March 31, 2017)
- Biyahe ni Drew (February 1, 2013—present)
- Para sa 'Yo ang Laban Na Ito (February 3, 2013—April 20, 2013)
- Juan dela Cruz (February 4, 2013—October 25, 2013)
- Wagas (February 9, 2013—November 15, 2019)
- Kanta Pilipinas (February 9, 2013—March 24, 2013)
- Never Say Goodbye (February 11, 2013—May 10, 2013)
- Bukod Kang Pinagpala (February 11, 2013—June 7, 2013)
- Apoy sa Dagat (February 11, 2013—July 5, 2013)
- Unforgettable (February 25, 2013—May 31, 2013)
- Martin Late at Night (March 1, 2013—May 31, 2013)
- Garantisadong Balita (March 4, 2013—July 31, 2020)
- Vampire ang Daddy Ko (March 9, 2013—June 12, 2016)
- Bayan Ko (March 10, 2013—April 21, 2013)
- Little Champ (March 18, 2013—May 24, 2013)
- Mundo Mo'y Akin (March 18, 2013—September 6, 2013)
- Alisto (March 23, 2013—February 9, 2021)
- Dugong Buhay (April 8, 2013—September 27, 2013)
- The Ryzza Mae Show (April 8, 2013—September 18, 2015)
- Love & Lies (April 8, 2013—June 7, 2013)
- Kakambal ni Eliana (April 15, 2013—August 23, 2013)
- Home Sweet Home (April 22, 2013—July 19, 2013)
- GMA Blockbusters (May 5, 2013—February 23, 2025)
- Cassandra: Warrior Angel (May 6, 2013—August 2, 2013)
- My Little Juan (May 20, 2013—September 13, 2013)
- Annaliza (May 27, 2013—March 21, 2014)
- Mga Basang Sisiw (June 3, 2013—November 1, 2013)
- Anna Karenina (June 3, 2013—September 20, 2013)
- Maghihintay Pa Rin (June 10, 2013—September 27, 2013)
- My Husband's Lover (June 10, 2013—October 18, 2013)
- One Day Isang Araw (June 15, 2013—November 16, 2013)
- The Voice of the Philippines (June 15, 2013—March 1, 2015)
- Sunday All Stars (June 16, 2013—August 2, 2015)
- Huwag Ka Lang Mawawala (June 17, 2013—August 23, 2013)
- With a Smile (June 17, 2013—September 20, 2013)
- Undercover (July 1, 2013—August 30, 2013)
- Misibis Bay (July 1, 2013—August 30, 2013)
- Muling Buksan ang Puso (July 8, 2013—October 4, 2013)
- Binoy Henyo (July 22, 2013—September 20, 2013)
- Opposing Views (August 2, 2013—March 13, 2015)
- Titser (August 11, 2013—October 13, 2013)
- Anak Ko 'Yan! (August 26, 2013—November 15, 2013)
- Agila Balita (August 26, 2013—September 11, 2020)
- Pyra: Babaeng Apoy (August 26, 2013—November 29, 2013)
- Got to Believe (August 26, 2013—March 7, 2014)
- FPJ: Da King Magpakailanman (August 30, 2013—March 23, 2017)
- FPJ: Hari ng Pinoy Cinema (September 1, 2013—December 29, 2024)
- Bukas na Lang Kita Mamahalin (September 2, 2013—November 15, 2013)
- FPJ: Da King on ABS-CBN (September 8, 2013—January 12, 2014)
- Akin Pa Rin ang Bukas (September 9, 2013—December 27, 2013)
- Showbiz Police (September 14, 2013—June 6, 2014)
- Tropa Mo Ko Unli (September 14, 2013—July 4, 2015)
- What's Up Doods? (September 14, 2013—December 21, 2013)
- The Mega and The Songwriter (September 15, 2013—January 26, 2014)
- Wow Mali Pa Rin! (September 15, 2013—June 15, 2014)
- Bingit (September 21, 2013—November 16, 2013)
- Dormitoryo (September 22, 2013—December 22, 2013)
- Prinsesa ng Buhay Ko (September 23, 2013—January 24, 2014)
- Kahit Nasaan Ka Man (September 23, 2013—November 15, 2013)
- Love Hotline (September 23, 2013—April 29, 2016)
- Magkano Ba ang Pag-ibig? (September 30, 2013—February 14, 2014)
- Galema: Anak ni Zuma (September 30, 2013—March 28, 2014)
- Maria Mercedes (October 7, 2013—January 24, 2014)
- DZRH Network News (October 7, 2013—present)
- Face the People (October 14, 2013—November 21, 2014)
- Madam Chairman (October 14, 2013—February 28, 2014)
- Let's Ask Pilipinas (October 14, 2013—November 21, 2014)
- Genesis (October 14, 2013—December 27, 2013)
- For Love or Money (October 17, 2013—January 16, 2014)
- Positive (October 17, 2013—January 9, 2014)
- History with Lourd (October 17, 2013—April 26, 2016)
- Katipunan (October 19, 2013—December 28, 2013)
- Juan Direction (October 19, 2013—October 3, 2014)
- Honesto (October 28, 2013—March 14, 2014)
- Villa Quintana (November 4, 2013—June 6, 2014)
- Adarna (November 18, 2013—March 7, 2014)
- Out of Control (November 23, 2013—January 18, 2014)
- Picture! Picture! (November 23, 2013—June 15, 2014)
- True Horror Stories (December 29, 2013—March 16, 2014)
- Home Sweetie Home (January 5, 2014—March 14, 2020)
- The Borrowed Wife (January 20, 2014—May 23, 2014)
- News plus (January 20, 2014—December 26, 2014)
- The Score (January 20, 2014—July 22, 2020)
- Obsession (January 23, 2014—April 10, 2014)
- FPJ: Kampeon ng Aksyon (January 24, 2014—January 27, 2017)
- The Legal Wife (January 27, 2014—June 13, 2014)
- Paraiso Ko'y Ikaw (January 27, 2014—March 28, 2014)
- Carmela: Ang Pinakamagandang Babae sa Mundong Ibabaw (January 27, 2014—May 23, 2014)
- Rhodora X (January 27, 2014—May 30, 2014)
- Aquino & Abunda Tonight (February 10, 2014—September 25, 2015)
- Innamorata (February 17, 2014—June 20, 2014)
- Confessions of a Torpe (March 3, 2014—June 20, 2014)
- Ikaw Lamang (March 10, 2014—October 24, 2014)
- Kambal Sirena (March 10, 2014—June 27, 2014)
- Dyesebel (March 17, 2014—July 18, 2014)
- Frontliners (March 19, 2014—February 10, 2016)
- Asian Horror Stories (March 24, 2014—March 31, 2017)
- Mirabella (March 24, 2014—July 4, 2014)
- Agila Probinsiya (March 24, 2014—November 26, 2021)
- Klima ng Pagbabago (March 24, 2014—September 2, 2019)
- Moon of Desire (March 31, 2014—August 15, 2014)
- My OFW Story (April 11, 2014—February 12, 2016)
- One of the Boys (May 3, 2014—July 5, 2014)
- Basta Every Day Happy (May 12, 2014—January 5, 2015)
- The Voice Kids (May 24, 2014—November 3, 2019)
- Niño (May 26, 2014—September 12, 2014)
- GMA Tales of Horror (May 31, 2014—May 3, 2015)
- Jasmine (June 1, 2014—August 3, 2014)
- Serbisyo All Access (June 2, 2014—January 27, 2017)
- Ang Dalawang Mrs. Real (June 2, 2014—September 19, 2014)
- Ipaglaban Mo! (June 7, 2014—July 5, 2020)
- The Half Sisters (June 9, 2014—January 15, 2016)
- Sana Bukas pa ang Kahapon (June 16, 2014—October 10, 2014)
- Marian (June 21, 2014—December 6, 2014)
- Shop Japan (June 22, 2014—March 28, 2018)
- Ismol Family (June 22, 2014—November 6, 2016)
- Wow Mali: Lakas ng Tama (June 22, 2014—June 28, 2015)
- Dading (June 23, 2014—October 10, 2014)
- My BFF (June 30, 2014—October 3, 2014)
- My Destiny (June 30, 2014—October 17, 2014)
- Pure Love (July 7, 2014—November 14, 2014)
- Aksyon sa Umaga (July 21, 2014—November 3, 2017)
- Aksyon sa Tanghali (July 21, 2014—March 13, 2020)
- Hawak Kamay (July 21, 2014—November 21, 2014)
- Aksyon Tonite (July 21, 2014—March 1, 2019)
- Kapampangan News (August 4, 2014—March 31, 2017)
- Mga Kwento ni Marc Logan (August 9, 2014—September 9, 2017)
- Quiet Please!: Bawal ang Maingay (August 10, 2014—January 11, 2015)
- Sa Puso ni Dok (August 24, 2014—September 28, 2014)
- I Do (August 30, 2014—November 15, 2014)
- Trenderas (September 13, 2014—December 27, 2014)
- Strawberry Lane (September 15, 2014—January 2, 2015)
- Don't Lose the Money (September 22, 2014—December 22, 2014)
- Hiram na Alaala (September 22, 2014—January 9, 2015)
- Pinay Beauty Queen Academy (October 4, 2014—September 20, 2015)
- Bet ng Bayan (October 5, 2014—December 28, 2014)
- RadyoBisyon (October 6, 2014—June 2, 2017)
- Ang Lihim ni Annasandra (October 6, 2014—February 6, 2015)
- Seasons of Love (October 6, 2014—October 30, 2014)
- Elemento (October 10, 2014—October 31, 2014)
- Two Wives (October 13, 2014—March 13, 2015)
- Yagit (October 13, 2014—July 24, 2015)
- Ilustrado (October 20, 2014—November 14, 2014)
- Forevermore (October 27, 2014—May 22, 2015)
- Bagito (November 17, 2014—March 13, 2015)
- More Than Words (November 17, 2014—March 6, 2015)
- Dream Dad (November 24, 2014—April 17, 2015)
- Give Love on Christmas (December 1, 2014—January 16, 2015)
- Once Upon a Kiss (January 5, 2015—May 1, 2015)
- Second Chances (January 12, 2015—May 8, 2015)
- Oh My G! (January 19, 2015—July 24, 2015)
- FlordeLiza (January 19, 2015—August 28, 2015)
- Nasaan Ka Nang Kailangan Kita (January 19, 2015—October 16, 2015)
- Happy Wife, Happy Life (January 19, 2015—October 2, 2015)
- Solved na Solved (January 19, 2015—April 16, 2015)
- 2½ Daddies (January 24, 2015—July 4, 2015)
- Call Me Papa Jack (January 24, 2015—April 19, 2015)
- Move It: Clash of the Streetdancers (January 25, 2015—May 3, 2015)
- Mac and Chiz (January 25, 2015—June 28, 2015)
- Masayang Umaga Po! (January 26, 2015—September 1, 2017)
- Extreme Series: Kaya Mo Ba 'To? (February 2, 2015—June 20, 2015)
- Why News (February 2, 2015—July 31, 2024)
- Kailan Ba Tama ang Mali? (February 9, 2015—May 8, 2015)
- Pari 'Koy (March 9, 2015—August 21, 2015)
- Your Face Sounds Familiar (March 14, 2015—April 12, 2026)
- Sabado Badoo (March 14, 2015—July 25, 2015)
- Rising Stars Philippines (March 14, 2015—May 23, 2015)
- Inday Bote (March 16, 2015—May 29, 2015)
- Bridges of Love (March 16, 2015—August 7, 2015)
- CNN Philippines Headline News (March 16, 2015—February 12, 2016)
- CNN Philippines Newsroom (March 16, 2015—January 28, 2024)
- Global Conversations (March 20, 2015—August 26, 2016)
- InstaDad (April 5, 2015—July 5, 2015)
- Showbiz Konek na Konek (April 6, 2015—October 2, 2015)
- Karelasyon (April 11, 2015—May 13, 2017)
- Nathaniel (April 20, 2015—September 25, 2015)
- Let the Love Begin (May 4, 2015—August 7, 2015)
- Wowowin (May 10, 2015—April 5, 2023)
- Healing Hearts (May 11, 2015—September 11, 2015)
- The Rich Man's Daughter (May 11, 2015—August 7, 2015)
- Baker King (May 18, 2015—September 11, 2015)
- Pangako sa 'Yo (May 25, 2015—February 12, 2016)
- My Mother's Secret (May 25, 2015—August 7, 2015)
- Pasión de Amor (June 1, 2015—February 26, 2016)
- Happy Truck ng Bayan (June 14, 2015—February 7, 2016)
- Hi-5 Philippines (June 15, 2015—April 29, 2016)
- Iskoolmates (June 23, 2015—present)
- Alamat (July 12, 2015—June 19, 2016)
- Kalyeserye (July 16, 2015—December 17, 2016)
- To The Top (July 25, 2015—September 27, 2015)
- Ningning (July 27, 2015—January 15, 2016)
- Buena Familia (July 28, 2015—March 4, 2016)
- Sunday PinaSaya (August 9, 2015—December 29, 2019)
- On the Wings of Love (August 10, 2015—February 26, 2016)
- Home Foodie (August 10, 2015—September 6, 2019)
- Beautiful Strangers (August 10, 2015—November 27, 2015)
- My Faithful Husband (August 10, 2015—November 13, 2015)
- Juan Tamad (August 23, 2015—March 13, 2016)
- Doble Kara (August 24, 2015—February 10, 2017)
- Marimar (August 24, 2015—January 8, 2016)
- All of Me (August 31, 2015—January 29, 2016)
- Real Talk (September 7, 2015—December 29, 2017)
- Destiny Rose (September 14, 2015—March 11, 2016)
- My Fair Lady (September 14, 2015—December 11, 2015)
- CelebriTV (September 19, 2015—May 21, 2016)
- Princess in the Palace (September 21, 2015—June 10, 2016)
- Celebrity Playtime (September 26, 2015—April 3, 2016)
- Ang Probinsyano (September 28, 2015—August 12, 2022)
- Tonight with Boy Abunda (September 28, 2015—May 4, 2020)
- Top 5 (October 1, 2015—May 27, 2018)
- FPJ: Hari ng Aksyon (October 4, 2015—February 25, 2024)
- Walang Iwanan (October 19, 2015—December 4, 2015)
- Market Edge (October 26, 2015—present)
- Dangwa (October 26, 2015—January 29, 2016)
- You're My Home (November 9, 2015—March 23, 2016)
- Dance Kids (November 14, 2015—February 7, 2016)
- Little Nanay (November 16, 2015—March 23, 2016)
- Because of You (November 30, 2015—May 13, 2016)
- And I Love You So (December 7, 2015—March 11, 2016)
- Be My Lady (January 18, 2016—November 25, 2016)
- Wish I May (January 18, 2016—May 20, 2016)
- That's My Amboy (January 25, 2016—April 29, 2016)
- Tubig at Langis (February 1, 2016—September 2, 2016)
- Born to Be a Star (February 6, 2016—May 8, 2021)
- Tasya Fantasya (February 6, 2016—April 30, 2016)
- The Story of the Filipino (February 9, 2016—January 26, 2024)
- I Love OPM (February 13, 2016—April 23, 2016)
- Dear Uge (February 14, 2016—February 13, 2022)
- Dolce Amore (February 15, 2016—August 26, 2016)
- Bakit Manipis ang Ulap? (February 15, 2016—April 22, 2016)
- New Day (February 15, 2016—January 29, 2024)
- Midnight Horror Stories (February 20, 2016—August 12, 2017)
- Lip Sync Battle Philippines (February 27, 2016—July 1, 2018)
- We Will Survive (February 29, 2016—July 15, 2016)
- The Story of Us (February 29, 2016—June 17, 2016)
- Ang Panday (February 29, 2016—June 2, 2016)
- Happy Truck HAPPinas (March 6, 2016—May 1, 2016)
- Game ng Bayan (March 7, 2016—April 15, 2016)
- Hanggang Makita Kang Muli (March 7, 2016—July 15, 2016)
- The Millionaire's Wife (March 14, 2016—June 24, 2016)
- GMA News Update (March 28, 2016—April 8, 2018)
- Poor Señorita (March 28, 2016—July 15, 2016)
- Balitaan (April 4, 2016—January 26, 2024)
- Magandang Buhay (April 18, 2016—June 26, 2026)
- My Super D (April 18, 2016—July 15, 2016)
- Naku, Boss Ko! (April 25, 2016—May 5, 2016)
- Yan ang Morning! (May 2, 2016—August 12, 2016)
- Once Again (May 2, 2016—July 22, 2016)
- HAPPinas Happy Hour (May 6, 2016—September 30, 2016)
- We Love OPM (May 14, 2016—July 17, 2016)
- Juan Happy Love Story (May 16, 2016—September 2, 2016)
- Magkaibang Mundo (May 23, 2016—September 16, 2016)
- Laff Camera Action (May 28, 2016—August 27, 2016)
- A1 Ko Sa 'Yo (June 2, 2016—November 24, 2016)
- Calle Siete (June 13, 2016—October 21, 2016)
- Hay, Bahay! (June 19, 2016—August 27, 2017)
- Team Yey! (June 19, 2016—November 21, 2020)
- Born for You (June 20, 2016—September 16, 2016)
- Conan, My Beautician (June 26, 2016—September 18, 2016)
- Sa Piling ni Nanay (June 27, 2016—January 27, 2017)
- Sinungaling Mong Puso (July 18, 2016—October 28, 2016)
- Encantadia (July 18, 2016—May 19, 2017)
- UNTV C-News (July 18, 2016—present)
- UNTV Newsbreak (July 18, 2016—present)
- Till I Met You (August 29, 2016—January 20, 2017)
- Superstar Duets (September 3, 2016—December 17, 2016)
- Hashtag Like (September 3, 2016—February 11, 2017)
- Pasada Astig (September 3, 2016—July 1, 2017)
- The Greatest Love (September 5, 2016—April 21, 2017)
- Someone to Watch Over Me (September 5, 2016—January 6, 2017)
- Pinoy Boyband Superstar (September 10, 2016—December 11, 2016)
- Magpahanggang Wakas (September 19, 2016—January 6, 2017)
- Oh, My Mama! (September 19, 2016—December 2, 2016)
- Alyas Robin Hood (September 19, 2016—November 24, 2017)
- Usapang Real Love (September 25, 2016—December 18, 2016)
- The Source with Pinky Webb (September 26, 2016—January 26, 2024)
- Payo Alternatibo (October 9, 2016—February 24, 2019)
- Kilos Pronto (October 10, 2016—April 27, 2018)
- Headline Pilipinas (October 10, 2016—June 29, 2023)
- Tahor: Your Ultimate Gamefowl Show (October 22, 2016—December 30, 2018)
- Trops (October 24, 2016—September 22, 2017)
- The Big Story (October 24, 2016—present)
- Tulay: Your Bridge to Understanding, Peace and Prosperity (October 31, 2016—present)
- Hahamakin ang Lahat (October 31, 2016—February 17, 2017)
- Tsuperhero (November 13, 2016—April 23, 2017)
- Langit Lupa (November 28, 2016—April 28, 2017)
- Ika-6 na Utos (December 5, 2016—March 17, 2018)
- A Love to Last (January 9, 2017—September 22, 2017)
- Your Face Sounds Familiar Kids (January 7, 2017—August 19, 2018)
- Meant to Be (January 9, 2017—June 23, 2017)
- People vs. the Stars (January 15, 2017—April 16, 2017)
- My Dear Heart (January 23, 2017—June 16, 2017)
- Pinulot Ka Lang sa Lupa (January 30, 2017—April 12, 2017)
- Insider Exclusive Kapihan (February 1, 2017—November 6, 2019)
- The Better Half (February 13, 2017—September 8, 2017)
- Wildflower (February 13, 2017—February 9, 2018)
- Case Solved (February 18, 2017—March 25, 2017)
- Full House Tonight (February 18, 2017—May 27, 2017)
- Legally Blind (February 20, 2017—June 30, 2017)
- Destined to be Yours (February 27, 2017—May 26, 2017)
- I Can Do That (March 11, 2017—June 4, 2017)
- Pinas Sarap (March 23, 2017—present)
- News Night (March 27, 2017—January 26, 2024)
- The Voice Teens (April 16, 2017—August 16, 2020)
- D' Originals (April 17, 2017—July 7, 2017)
- Follow Your Heart (April 23, 2017—July 16, 2017)
- Pusong Ligaw (April 24, 2017—January 12, 2018)
- Daig Kayo ng Lola Ko (April 30, 2017—present)
- Ikaw Lang ang Iibigin (May 1, 2017—January 26, 2018)
- Daily Info (May 8, 2017—July 31, 2020)
- Bagong Pilipinas (May 17, 2017—July 31, 2020)
- Tadhana (May 20, 2017—present)
- Lakbai (May 21, 2017—July 9, 2017)
- Mulawin vs. Ravena (May 22, 2017—September 15, 2017)
- My Love from the Star (May 29, 2017—August 11, 2017)
- G Diaries (June 10, 2017—March 27, 2022)
- La Luna Sangre (June 19, 2017—March 2, 2018)
- I Heart Davao (June 26, 2017—August 18, 2017)
- An Evening with Raoul (July 1, 2017—August 19, 2017)
- Impostora (July 3, 2017—February 9, 2018)
- Haplos (July 10, 2017—February 23, 2018)
- Sentro Balita (July 10, 2017—present)
- Ulat Bayan (July 10, 2017—present)
- PTV News Headlines (July 10, 2017—July 31, 2020)
- Ulat Bayan Weekend (July 15, 2017—present)
- Road Trip (July 23, 2017—January 14, 2018)
- Little Big Shots (August 12, 2017—December 31, 2017)
- Aksyon Alerts (August 14, 2017—March 13, 2020)
- G.R.I.N.D. Get Ready It's a New Day (August 19, 2017—October 21, 2017)
- My Korean Jagiya (August 21, 2017—January 12, 2018)
- All-Star Videoke (September 3, 2017—March 25, 2018)
- Japan Japan 47 (September 3, 2017—November 26, 2017)
- Dok Ricky, Pedia (September 9, 2017—January 18, 2020)
- The Promise of Forever (September 11, 2017—November 24, 2017)
- I Can See Your Voice (September 16, 2017—July 14, 2024)
- Super Ma'am (September 18, 2017—January 26, 2018)
- Bossing & Ai (September 24, 2017—February 4, 2018)
- The Good Son (September 25, 2017—April 13, 2018)
- The Lolas' Beautiful Show (September 25, 2017—February 2, 2018)
- Pasada Pelikula (September 25, 2017—April 13, 2024)
- PNA Newsroom (October 16, 2017—July 11, 2022)
- Stories for the Soul (October 29, 2017—June 30, 2019)
- Hanggang Saan (November 27, 2017—April 27, 2018)
- Kambal, Karibal (November 27, 2017—August 3, 2018)
- SportsCenter Philippines (December 17, 2017—January 5, 2020)
- Crime Desk (January 13, 2018—June 1, 2019)
- Asintado (January 15, 2018—October 5, 2018)
- The One That Got Away (January 15, 2018—May 18, 2018)
- Sirkus (January 21, 2018—April 15, 2018)
- Sana Dalawa ang Puso (January 29, 2018—September 14, 2018)
- Sherlock Jr. (January 29, 2018—April 27, 2018)
- The Blood Sisters (February 12, 2018—August 17, 2018)
- The Stepdaughters (February 12, 2018—October 19, 2018)
- Hindi Ko Kayang Iwan Ka (February 26, 2018—August 31, 2018)
- Bagani (March 5, 2018—August 17, 2018)
- Ang Forever Ko'y Ikaw (March 12, 2018—May 4, 2018)
- Contessa (March 19, 2018—September 8, 2018)
- The Atom Araullo Specials (April 1, 2018—present)
- Panalo Ka 'Nay! (April 8, 2018—May 27, 2018)
- Since I Found You (April 16, 2018—August 10, 2018)
- Amo (April 21, 2018—July 14, 2018)
- The Cure (April 30, 2018—July 27, 2018)
- My Guitar Princess (May 7, 2018—July 13, 2018)
- Inday Will Always Love You (May 21, 2018—October 5, 2018)
- Agenda with Cito Beltran (May 28, 2018—December 29, 2023)
- One News Now (May 28, 2018—present)
- One News Live (May 28, 2018—April 28, 2019)
- Amazing Earth (June 17, 2018—present)
- The Clash (July 7, 2018—present)
- Kapag Nahati ang Puso (July 16, 2018—November 2, 2018)
- Aja Aja Tayo! (July 21, 2018—June 2, 2019)
- Pareng Partners (July 28, 2018—March 23, 2019)
- Victor Magtanggol (July 30, 2018—November 16, 2018)
- Onanay (August 6, 2018—March 15, 2019)
- Halik (August 13, 2018—April 26, 2019)
- Star Hunt: The Grand Audition Show (August 20, 2018—November 9, 2018)
- Ngayon at Kailanman (August 20, 2018—January 18, 2019)
- The Kids' Choice (September 1, 2018—November 4, 2018)
- My Special Tatay (September 3, 2018—March 29, 2019)
- Uniporme (September 8, 2018—December 1, 2018)
- Ika-5 Utos (September 10, 2018—February 8, 2019)
- Playhouse (September 17, 2018—March 22, 2019)
- Eagle News International Filipino Edition (October 2, 2018—February 12, 2021)
- Kadenang Ginto (October 8, 2018—February 7, 2020)
- Pamilya Roces (October 8, 2018—December 14, 2018)
- Daddy's Gurl (October 13, 2018—May 6, 2023)
- Studio 7 (October 14, 2018—December 7, 2019)
- Asawa Ko, Karibal Ko (October 22, 2018—March 2, 2019)
- Usapang SSS (November 1, 2018—March 2, 2019)
- Titas of the Metro (November 3, 2018—December 8, 2018)
- Toppstar TV (November 10, 2018—December 8, 2019)
- Ang Hari: FPJ on ABS-CBN (November 11, 2018—May 3, 2020)
- Alamat ng Ano (November 16, 2018—January 18, 2019)
- Spirits: Reawaken (November 16, 2018—February 16, 2019)
- F Talk (November 17, 2018—February 24, 2019)
- Cain at Abel (November 19, 2018—February 15, 2019)
- ASK TV: Artihan, Sayawan at Kantahan (December 1, 2018—March 21, 2020)
- The End (December 21, 2018—January 19, 2019)
- HIGH (January 5, 2019—February 23, 2019)
- Time Out (January 12, 2019—January 26, 2019)
- World of Dance Philippines (January 12, 2019—April 7, 2019)
- The General's Daughter (January 21, 2019—October 4, 2019)
- The Boobay and Tekla Show (January 27, 2019—present)
- Saludo: Pagpupugay sa Bayaning Pilipino (January 27, 2019—March 24, 2019)
- TODA One I Love (February 4, 2019—April 17, 2019)
- Inagaw na Bituin (February 11, 2019—May 17, 2019)
- Mula sa Edukador (February 17, 2019—May 5, 2019)
- Kara Mia (February 18, 2019—June 28, 2019)
- One Balita Pilipinas (February 18, 2019—present)
- Agila Pilipinas (February 18, 2019—August 9, 2021)
- Politics as Usual (February 19, 2019—May 14, 2020)
- Hiram na Anak (February 25, 2019—May 3, 2019)
- Tutok Treze (February 25, 2019—present)
- Talents Academy (March 2, 2019—March 21, 2020)
- Dragon Lady (March 4, 2019—July 20, 2019)
- Bukas May Kahapon (March 4, 2019—April 26, 2019)
- Sahaya (March 18, 2019—September 6, 2019)
- OOTD: Opisyal of the Day (March 19, 2019—May 9, 2019)
- Tilaok TV (March 22, 2019—March 21, 2020)
- Nang Ngumiti ang Langit (March 25, 2019—October 18, 2019)
- Bihag (April 1, 2019—August 16, 2019)
- Hiwaga ng Kambat (April 21, 2019—August 25, 2019)
- Idol Philippines (April 21, 2019—July 28, 2019)
- Love You Two (April 22, 2019—September 13, 2019)
- Kuha Mo! (April 27, 2019—July 25, 2020)
- Sino ang Maysala?: Mea Culpa (April 29, 2019—August 9, 2019)
- Alex & Amie (May 20, 2019—May 31, 2019)
- Dahil sa Pag-ibig (May 20, 2019—October 4, 2019)
- Glow Up (June 9, 2019—March 15, 2020)
- The Better Woman (July 1, 2019—September 27, 2019)
- Artista Teen Quest (July 12, 2019—December 28, 2019)
- Hanggang sa Dulo ng Buhay Ko (July 22, 2019—October 19, 2019)
- World-Class Kababayan (July 27, 2019—October 19, 2019)
- Regional TV Weekend News (July 27, 2019—July 24, 2021)
- iWant Originals (August 11, 2019—April 3, 2020)
- The Killer Bride (August 12, 2019—January 17, 2020)
- Unlad Pilipinas (August 12, 2019—present)
- Prima Donnas (August 19, 2019—April 30, 2022)
- Arnelli in da Haus (August 22, 2019—January 29, 2020)
- Parasite Island (September 8, 2019—December 1, 2019)
- Pamilya Ko (September 9, 2019—March 13, 2020)
- Beautiful Justice (September 9, 2019—January 24, 2020)
- The Gift (September 16, 2019—February 7, 2020)
- Off-Court Battle (September 29, 2019—October 13, 2019)
- Sandugo (September 30, 2019—March 20, 2020)
- One of the Baes (September 30, 2019—January 31, 2020)
- Lutong-Luto with CJ Hirro (October 5, 2019—January 4, 2020)
- Starla (October 7, 2019—January 10, 2020)
- Madrasta (October 7, 2019—February 21, 2020)
- ATC E-Sports Highlights (October 12, 2019—January 11, 2020)
- Eucharistia: Pananalangin at Pag-aaral (October 12, 2019—January 18, 2020)
- Magkaagaw (October 21, 2019—March 31, 2021)
- Your Moment (November 9, 2019—February 2, 2020)
- Ani at Kita (November 16, 2019—December 29, 2019)
- The Haunted (December 8, 2019—February 9, 2020)

== 2020s ==
- All-Out Sundays (January 5, 2020—present)
- Make It with You (January 13, 2020—March 13, 2020)
- A Soldier's Heart (January 20, 2020—September 18, 2020)
- Anak ni Waray vs. Anak ni Biday (January 27, 2020—March 12, 2021)
- Love of My Life (February 3, 2020—March 19, 2021)
- Love Thy Woman (February 10, 2020—September 11, 2020)
- Descendants of the Sun (February 10, 2020—December 25, 2020)
- Headline Pilipinas Weekend (February 15, 2020—May 8, 2021)
- Centerstage (February 16, 2020—June 6, 2021)
- Ilaban Natin Yan! (February 22, 2020—April 4, 2020)
- 24/7 (February 23, 2020—March 15, 2020)
- Bilangin ang Bituin sa Langit (February 24, 2020—March 26, 2021)
- Kuwentuhang Lokal (March 14, 2020—September 15, 2021)
- Kapamilya Daily Mass (March 16, 2020—present)
- Team Fitfil (April 1, 2020–September 15, 2024)
- Jet and the Pet Rangers (April 3, 2020—May 15, 2020)
- Serbisyong Bayanihan (April 6, 2020—present)
- 24 Oras News Alert (April 18, 2020—March 31, 2023)
- The Final Word with Rico Hizon (April 20, 2020—January 26, 2024)
- Matters of Fact (April 27, 2020—May 21, 2021)
- Balita Ngayon (May 8, 2020—June 29, 2023)
- Failon Ngayon sa TeleRadyo (May 8, 2020—August 31, 2020)
- Lingkod Kapamilya sa TeleRadyo (May 8, 2020—June 29, 2023)
- Pasada sa TeleRadyo (May 8, 2020—June 29, 2023)
- Lingkod Aksyon (May 17, 2020—August 8, 2021)
- Hataw Balita Pilipinas (May 25, 2020—February 2, 2024)
- Bro. Eddie Villanueva Classics (June 1, 2020—present)
- Ito Ang Balita Weekend Edition (June 6, 2020—present)
- Idol in Action (June 8, 2020—October 1, 2021)
- Happy Naman D'yan (June 8, 2020—July 17, 2020)
- Kapamilya Action Sabado (June 13, 2020—present)
- Paano Kita Mapasasalamatan? (June 13, 2020—June 26, 2021)
- FPJ Da King (June 14, 2020—December 31, 2023)
- Iba 'Yan (June 14, 2020—June 27, 2021)
- Kapamilya Gold Hits (June 15, 2020—present)
- UNTV News Worldwide (July 13, 2020—February 2, 2024)
- PTV Balita Ngayon (July 27, 2020—present)
- FYI (August 2, 2020—September 25, 2022)
- Bawal na Game Show (August 15, 2020—March 30, 2021)
- Fill in the Bank (August 15, 2020—March 31, 2021)
- Usapang Real Life (August 15, 2020—January 9, 2021)
- Fit for Life (August 16, 2020—November 1, 2020)
- Chika, Besh! (August 17, 2020—January 8, 2021)
- Ang sa Iyo ay Akin (August 17, 2020—March 19, 2021)
- Clinking Party Confetti Special (August 17, 2020—September 26, 2043)
- TeleBalita Weekend (August 29, 2020—September 20, 2020)
- Winner sa Life (August 29, 2020—June 24, 2023)
- Your Daily Do's (August 29, 2020—June 24, 2023)
- Playback (August 31, 2020—June 29, 2023)
- Quaranthings (September 4, 2020—January 21, 2022)
- Rise and Shine Pilipinas (September 7, 2020—present)
- PTV News Tonight (September 7, 2020—present)
- TeleBalita (September 9, 2020—September 18, 2020)
- Happy Time (September 14, 2020—October 15, 2021)
- Makulay ang Buhay (September 15, 2020—November 16, 2021)
- TeleRadyo Balita (September 21, 2020—June 29, 2023)
- Business Above Usual (September 26, 2020—November 5, 2021)
- TeleRadyo Balita Weekend (September 26, 2020—May 29, 2022)
- Kesayasaya (September 27, 2020–2021)
- Sine Date Weekends (September 27, 2020—present)
- The Big Picture (September 27, 2020—January 29, 2023)
- I Can See You (September 28, 2020—February 4, 2022)
- Walang Hanggang Paalam (September 28, 2020—April 16, 2021)
- Ted Failon at DJ Chacha sa Radyo5 (October 5, 2020—November 1, 2024)
- Radyo5 Network News (October 5, 2020—September 29, 2023)
- Frontline Pilipinas (October 5, 2020—present)
- News5 Alerts (October 5, 2020—present)
- Bida Konsyumer (October 10, 2020—June 24, 2023)
- Primetime Zinema (October 12, 2020—December 31, 2021)
- Sunday Noontime Live! (October 18, 2020—January 17, 2021)
- Sunday 'Kada (October 18, 2020—January 17, 2021)
- Tropang LOL (October 19, 2020—April 29, 2023)
- Oh My Dad! (October 24, 2020—April 24, 2021)
- Masked Singer Pilipinas (October 24, 2020—August 17, 2025)
- Holiday Gifts (October 25, 2020—January 10, 2021)
- Bagong Umaga (October 26, 2020—April 30, 2021)
- Hapinay (November 9, 2020—January 27, 2023)
- A2Z News Alert (November 16, 2020—November 12, 2021)
- Ate ng Ate Ko (November 23, 2020—February 15, 2021)
- Paano ang Pangako? (November 23, 2020—March 31, 2021)
- Stay-In Love (November 24, 2020—February 16, 2021)
- Bella Bandida (November 25, 2020—December 30, 2020)
- Carpool (November 26, 2020—December 31, 2020)
- The Game (December 7, 2020—January 31, 2024)
- Eat's Singing Time (January 4, 2021—May 28, 2021)
- Sleepless: The Series (January 6, 2021—February 17, 2021)
- Eat Well, Live Well, Stay Well (January 8, 2021—April 1, 2022)
- Letters & Music Weekend Edition (January 9, 2021—present)
- Wanted: Ang Serye (January 16, 2021—May 1, 2021)
- The Lost Recipe (January 18, 2021—March 31, 2021)
- Red Envelope (January 22, 2021—February 19, 2021)
- John en Ellen (January 24, 2021—August 1, 2021)
- My Fantastic Pag-ibig (January 30, 2021—October 30, 2021)
- Catch Me Out Philippines (February 6, 2021—April 24, 2021)
- Game of the Gens (February 14, 2021—June 28, 2021)
- Balitalakayan (February 15, 2021—January 20, 2022)
- Owe My Love (February 15, 2021—June 4, 2021)
- One Balita Ngayon (February 15, 2021—December 6, 2023)
- On Record (February 16, 2021—January 11, 2022)
- Farm to Table (February 21, 2021—present)
- Babawiin Ko ang Lahat (February 22, 2021—May 21, 2021)
- Ang Inyong Kawal (February 27, 2021—present)
- Ikaw ay Akin (March 6, 2021—May 29, 2021)
- Gen Z (March 7, 2021—May 30, 2021)
- The Wall Philippines (March 13, 2021—December 4, 2022)
- First Yaya (March 15, 2021—July 2, 2021)
- Stories of Hope (March 15, 2021—January 10, 2022)
- 1000 Heartbeats: Pintig Pinoy (March 20, 2021—June 12, 2021)
- Aja! Aja! Tayo sa Jeju (March 20, 2021—June 12, 2021)
- Huwag Kang Mangamba (March 22, 2021—November 12, 2021)
- Sing Galing! (April 5, 2021—August 3, 2025)
- Niña Niño (April 5, 2021—May 19, 2022)
- Init sa Magdamag (April 19, 2021—September 10, 2021)
- Heartful Café (April 26, 2021—June 18, 2021)
- The Game (April 26, 2021—January 31, 2024)
- Agimat ng Agila (May 1, 2021—May 7, 2022)
- Oras ng Kings (May 8, 2021—July 31, 2021)
- Frontline sa Umaga (May 10, 2021—October 18, 2024)
- Rise Up Stronger (May 23, 2021—August 8, 2021)
- After the Fact (May 24, 2021—March 30, 2022)
- Everybody, Sing! (June 5, 2021—February 11, 2024)
- Rolling In It Philippines (June 5, 2021—September 24, 2022)
- Click, Like, Share (June 5, 2021—February 2, 2022)
- Lingap Stories (June 12, 2021—present)
- POPinoy (June 13, 2021—November 7, 2021)
- Puto (June 19, 2021—September 11, 2021)
- Ang Dalawang Ikaw (June 21, 2021—September 10, 2021)
- Tina Monzon-Palma Reports (June 26, 2021—present)
- La Vida Lena (June 28, 2021—February 4, 2022)
- POPinoy PopDates (July 4, 2021—November 14, 2021)
- Flex (July 4, 2021—August 21, 2021)
- The World Between Us (July 5, 2021—January 7, 2022)
- Balitang A2Z (July 26, 2021—present)
- Legal Wives (July 26, 2021—November 12, 2021)
- Regional TV News (July 26, 2021—May 31, 2024)
- Regal Treasures (July 30, 2021—June 16, 2025)
- Aksyon Time (July 31, 2021—January 29, 2022)
- Ito Ang Tahanan (August 9, 2021—present)
- Let's Get Ready To TV-Radyo (August 9, 2021—August 5, 2022)
- Kada Umaga (August 30, 2021—present)
- Regal Studio Presents (September 11, 2021—present)
- Marry Me, Marry You (September 13, 2021—January 21, 2022)
- Stories from the Heart (September 13, 2021—January 7, 2022)
- Di Na Muli (September 18, 2021—December 18, 2021)
- Frontline Tonight (September 27, 2021—present)
- Pet Pals TV (October 9, 2021—September 11, 2022)
- (A.S.P.N.) Ano sa Palagay Niyo (October 18, 2021—present)
- Dapat Alam Mo! (October 18, 2021—October 25, 2024)
- Funniest Snackable Videos (November 1, 2021—April 1, 2022)
- Hero City Kids Force (November 6, 2021—January 29, 2022)
- Diskarte (November 12, 2021—June 23, 2023)
- Cucina ni Nadia (November 13, 2021—June 4, 2022)
- I Left My Heart in Sorsogon (November 15, 2021—February 11, 2022)
- Ulat A2Z (November 15, 2021—present)
- Viral Scandal (November 15, 2021—May 13, 2022)
- Responde: Mata ng Mamamayan (November 20, 2021—present)
- Tara! Ating Pasyalan (November 20, 2021—present)
- Tara Game, Agad Agad! (November 21, 2021—May 15, 2022)
- Saying Goodbye (December 4, 2021—January 22, 2022)
- Hello, Heart (December 15, 2021—February 2, 2022)
- The Kangks Show (December 17, 2021—January 28, 2022)
- Afternoon Zinema (January 3, 2022—present)
- Mano Po Legacy: The Family Fortune (January 3, 2022—February 25, 2022)
- Little Princess (January 10, 2022—April 22, 2022)
- The Broken Marriage Vow (January 24, 2022—June 24, 2022)
- Proyekto Pilipino (February 6, 2022—May 11, 2024)
- First Lady (February 14, 2022—July 1, 2022)
- The Best Ka! (February 20, 2022—June 5, 2022)
- Bet to Serve (February 27, 2022—April 28, 2022)
- Widows' Web (February 28, 2022—April 29, 2022)
- Artikulo 247 (March 7, 2022—June 3, 2022)
- Mano Po Legacy: Her Big Boss (March 14, 2022—June 2, 2022)
- The Chatroom (March 17, 2022—September 15, 2023)
- BalitaOnenan! (March 21, 2022—present)
- Julius and Tintin: Para sa Pamilyang Pilipino (March 21, 2022—present)
- Ride Tribe (March 27, 2022—present)
- Know Your Candidates (April 4, 2022—May 7, 2025)
- Mata ng Agila International (April 4, 2022—present)
- KBYN: Kaagapay ng Bayan (April 10, 2022—January 1, 2023)
- AgriKids (April 17, 2022—present)
- Lakwatsika (April 18, 2022—July 15, 2022)
- Raya Sirena (April 24, 2022—June 5, 2022)
- Raising Mamay (April 25, 2022—July 29, 2022)
- Apoy sa Langit (May 2, 2022—September 3, 2022)
- False Positive (May 2, 2022—May 27, 2022)
- One Balita Weekend (May 7, 2022—December 31, 2023)
- Jose & Maria's Bonggang Villa (May 14, 2022—March 23, 2024)
- 2 Good 2 Be True (May 16, 2022—November 11, 2022)
- Dear God (May 23, 2022—July 14, 2022)
- Love in 40 Days (May 30, 2022—October 28, 2022)
- Bolera (May 30, 2022—August 26, 2022)
- The Fake Life (June 6, 2022—September 23, 2022)
- Flower of Evil (June 25, 2022—October 9, 2022)
- TOLS (June 25, 2022—September 17, 2022)
- A Family Affair (June 27, 2022—November 4, 2022)
- Lolong (July 4, 2022—September 30, 2022)
- Suntok sa Buwan (July 18, 2022—December 8, 2022)
- TiktoClock (July 25, 2022—present)
- Return to Paradise (August 1, 2022—November 4, 2022)
- Darna (August 15, 2022—February 10, 2023)
- What We Could Be (August 29, 2022—October 27, 2022)
- Running Man Philippines (September 3, 2022—September 8, 2024)
- Love, Bosleng & Tali! (September 4, 2022—present)
- Abot-Kamay na Pangarap (September 5, 2022—October 19, 2024)
- Mike Abe Live! (September 5, 2022—September 4, 2025)
- ONE Warrior Series: Philippines (September 18, 2022—November 27, 2022)
- Mang Lalakbay (September 25, 2022—February 12, 2023)
- Nakarehas na Puso (September 26, 2022—January 13, 2023)
- Start-Up PH (September 26, 2022—December 23, 2022)
- Woman in Action (October 1, 2022—present)
- Ano'ng Meron kay Abok? (October 1, 2022—June 3, 2023)
- Korina Interviews (October 2, 2022—December 31, 2023)
- Hallypop Fresh (October 2, 2022—September 19, 2024)
- Maria Clara at Ibarra (October 3, 2022—February 24, 2023)
- Hallypop Hits (October 4, 2022—September 19, 2024)
- Hallypop Lokal (October 6, 2022—September 19, 2024)
- Mano Po Legacy: The Flower Sisters (October 31, 2022—January 13, 2023)
- Unica Hija (November 7, 2022—March 3, 2023)
- The Iron Heart (November 14, 2022—October 13, 2023)
- Dream Maker (November 19, 2022—February 12, 2023)
- NegoSHEnte (November 19, 2022—November 19, 2023)
- Negoskarte (May 13, 2026–present)
- Popoy Lupoy (July 4, 2026—present)
- Shuffle: Honoring God Through Music (January 1, 2023—present)
- NCCT Originals (January 7, 2023—April 30, 2023)
- Underage (January 16, 2023—May 5, 2023)
- Luv Is (January 16, 2023—July 28, 2023)
- Saka-Inan (January 21, 2023—April 22, 2023)
- The AI Talks with The Voice Master (June 22, 2026—present)
- GoodWill (January 22, 2023—present)
- Fast Talk with Boy Abunda (January 23, 2023—present)
- Dirty Linen (January 23, 2023—August 25, 2023)
- Radyo5 Balita Pilipinas (January 23, 2023—November 1, 2024)
- Sa'ng Daang PIEnalo (January 28, 2023—April 30, 2023)
- IpaBITAG Mo (January 30, 2023—present)
- The Chosen One: Barkadahan (February 4, 2023—April 22, 2023)
- Cayetano in Action with Boy Abunda (February 5, 2023—January 11, 2026)
- PIE Shorts (February 5, 2023—April 23, 2023)
- Hallyflix (February 11, 2023—September 19, 2024)
- Batang Quiapo (February 13, 2023—March 13, 2026)
- Pak na Pak! Palong Follow (February 13, 2023—April 28, 2023)
- Papa ng Masa (February 18, 2023—April 29, 2023)
- Dear SV (February 18, 2023—March 1, 2025)
- One News Now: Business (February 20, 2023—December 29, 2023)
- One News Now: Markets (February 20, 2023—March 31, 2023)
- One News Now: Sports (February 20, 2023—December 29, 2023)
- One News Now: World (February 20, 2023—December 29, 2023)
- Mga Lihim ni Urduja (February 27, 2023—May 5, 2023)
- Reality Check (March 4, 2023—present)
- AraBella (March 6, 2023—June 23, 2023)
- Ang Tingog ni Nanay (March 6, 2023—present)
- Bawat Tibok ng Puso (March 7, 2023—present)
- Ticktalk (March 9, 2023—present)
- Our Hope (March 10, 2023—present)
- Hearts on Ice (March 13, 2023—June 16, 2023)
- The Write One (March 20, 2023—May 25, 2023)
- Genious Teens (March 25, 2023—May 20, 2023)
- GMA Integrated News Bulletin (April 1, 2023—March 30, 2026)
- The SPG Show: Saktong Pang Gabi (April 10, 2023—August 18, 2023)
- Great Lakes of the Philippines (April 16, 2023—May 21, 2023)
- Over a Glass or Two (April 22, 2023—September 2, 2023)
- Barangay Mirandas (April 23, 2023—July 23, 2023)
- Mga Kuwento ng Dilim (April 29, 2023—September 3, 2023)
- Para sa All (April 30, 2023—August 20, 2023)
- Face 2 Face (May 1, 2023—October 18, 2024)
- Kung Saka-Sakali (May 1, 2023—September 8, 2023)
- Shoutout TV (May 1, 2023—August 20, 2023)
- Matching Matching (May 1, 2023—August 18, 2023)
- Pak na Pak! (May 1, 2023—June 30, 2023)
- Ur Da Boss (May 1, 2023—December 29, 2023)
- Batas et Al (May 4, 2023—January 25, 2024)
- Resibo: Walang Lusot ang May Atraso (May 7, 2023—present)
- The Seed of Love (May 8, 2023—August 25, 2023)
- Voltes V: Legacy (May 8, 2023—September 8, 2023)
- The View From Manila (May 8, 2023—present)
- Thought Leaders (May 9, 2023—present)
- Private Convos (May 10, 2023—April 17, 2024)
- Roundtable (May 11, 2023—present)
- The Men's Room (May 12, 2023—present)
- Emojination (May 14, 2023—September 6, 2025)
- Jack and Jill sa Diamond Hills (May 14, 2023—May 5, 2024)
- Sumbong N'yo, Aksyon Agad (May 22, 2023—present)
- Sparks Camp (May 24, 2023—September 3, 2025)
- Unbreak My Heart (May 29, 2023—November 16, 2023)
- Love Ko si Lord (June 6, 2023—present)
- Tara Lezz Go (June 7, 2023—present)
- Atmosphere of Miracles (June 10, 2023—September 2, 2023)
- NAPC: Aksyon Laban sa Kahirapan (June 10, 2023—September 9, 2023)
- Bagong Barangay ng Mamamayan in Action (June 15, 2023—present)
- Tao Po! (June 18, 2023—July 18, 2026)
- Gud Morning Kapatid (June 19, 2023—present)
- Royal Blood (June 19, 2023—September 22, 2023)
- Team Yey! Vlogs (June 24, 2023—August 26, 2023)
- Mata ng Agila sa Tanghali (June 26, 2023—present)
- Magandang Dilag (June 26, 2023—November 10, 2023)
- TeleRadyo Serbisyo Balita (June 30, 2023—May 29, 2025)
- Tatak: Serbisyo (June 30, 2023—May 30, 2025)
- Headline Ngayon (June 30, 2023—present)
- E.A.T. (July 1, 2023—January 5, 2024)
- Headlines of the Day (July 1, 2023—October 5, 2024)
- Win Today (July 1, 2023—present)
- Iwas Sakit, Iwas Gastos (July 1, 2023—present)
- Wais Konsyumer (July 1, 2023—March 22, 2025)
- Aprub 'Yan! (July 2, 2023—present)
- Panalong Diskarte (July 2, 2023—present)
- Wow Sikat (July 2, 2023—August 24, 2025)
- Gus Abelgas Forensics (July 15, 2023—present)
- Magandang ARAw (July 15, 2023—present)
- SKL: Share Ko Lang (July 17, 2023—June 28, 2024)
- TeleRadyo Serbisyo Rewind (July 17, 2023—September 23, 2023)
- Isyu Spotted (July 17, 2023—present)
- Pasada (July 17, 2023—June 28, 2024)
- Kasalo (July 17, 2023—June 28, 2024)
- Bagong Pilipinas (July 22, 2023—present)
- PBBM Vlog (July 24, 2023—present)
- On the Ground (July 24, 2023—present)
- Minsan pa Nating Hagkan ang Nakaraan (July 25, 2023—October 20, 2023)
- Nag-aapoy na Damdamin (July 25, 2023—January 26, 2024)
- Pira-Pirasong Paraiso (July 25, 2023—January 27, 2024)
- For the Love (August 5, 2023—October 28, 2023)
- Art Academy (August 5, 2023—present)
- Ang Tinig Nyo (August 5, 2023—March 22, 2025)
- Pasado Serbisyo (August 5, 2023—present)
- Spot Report (August 5, 2023—present)
- Feel Kita (August 5, 2023—present)
- Story Outlook (August 6, 2023—present)
- Bongga Ka Jhai (August 6, 2023—present)
- Konek Ka D'yan (August 6, 2023—present)
- Travel ni Ahwel (August 6, 2023—present)
- GBU: God Bless U (August 6, 2023—present)
- Kiddie Explorers (August 13, 2023—present)
- Mukhang Perya (August 21, 2023—December 31, 2023)
- OFW Ikaw Ang Bida! (August 26, 2023—present)
- Wow Mali: Doble Tama (August 26, 2023—October 26, 2024)
- The Missing Husband (August 28, 2023—December 15, 2023)
- Senior High (August 28, 2023—January 19, 2024)
- Wow Mali: Doble Tawa (August 28, 2023—October 26, 2024)
- Ito Ang Kongreso (August 28, 2023—July 14, 2024)
- The Good Story (August 29, 2023—present)
- Great Day to Live (September 1, 2023—present)
- Bagong Pilipinas, PBBM: Lingkod ng Bayan (September 3, 2023—present)
- Balita Ko (September 4, 2023—November 10, 2023)
- Pamilya Talk with Tita Jing (September 9, 2023—May 11, 2024)
- Tamang Hinala (September 9, 2023—December 31, 2023)
- Maging Sino Ka Man (September 11, 2023—November 3, 2023)
- Spingo (September 11, 2023—December 8, 2023)
- 3PM Luzon Visayas Mindanao: Pilipinas Muna (September 11, 2023—present)
- Watchawin (September 11, 2023—December 29, 2023)
- Pinoy Crime Stories (September 16, 2023—July 27, 2024)
- Bagong Pilipinas Ngayon (September 18, 2023—present)
- Love Before Sunrise (September 25, 2023—December 29, 2023)
- On Assignment (September 25, 2023—present)
- Headline Ngayon Express (September 25, 2023—November 17, 2023)
- Sparkle U (October 1, 2023—January 28, 2024)
- Frontline Pilipinas Weekend (October 14, 2023—present)
- It's Your Lucky Day (October 14, 2023—October 27, 2023)
- Headline Ngayon Weekend (October 14, 2023—June 1, 2025)
- Can't Buy Me Love (October 16, 2023—May 10, 2024)
- Masters of the Game (October 22, 2023—December 31, 2023)
- Black Rider (November 6, 2023—July 26, 2024)
- Stolen Life (November 13, 2023—March 1, 2024)
- Abogado ng Bayan (November 18, 2023—January 27, 2024)
- Lovers & Liars (November 20, 2023—January 11, 2024)
- Cabinet @ Work (December 11, 2023—present)
- Starkada (December 18, 2023—present)
- Tahanang Pinakamasaya (January 6, 2024—March 2, 2024)
- Makiling (January 8, 2024—May 3, 2024)
- Love. Die. Repeat. (January 15, 2024—March 27, 2024)
- Asawa ng Asawa Ko (January 15, 2024—January 9, 2025)
- Afternoon Delight (January 15, 2024—present)
- Storycon (January 15, 2024—present)
- Linlang (January 22, 2024—June 14, 2024)
- Serbisyo Muna (January 27, 2024—April 27, 2024)
- Starting Lineup (February 1, 2024—present)
- Hataw Balita Ngayon (February 5, 2024—present)
- In Person (March 1, 2024—present)
- Expertalk (March 2, 2024—present)
- Lilet Matias: Attorney-at-Law (March 4, 2024—February 8, 2025)
- Radyo 630 Balita (March 4, 2024—May 29, 2025)
- Dok True Ba? (March 9, 2024—present)
- At the Moment with Imee (March 9, 2024—February 9, 2025)
- Hello Pagkain! (March 9, 2024—October 5, 2024)
- Barangay Singko Panalo (March 11, 2024—June 28, 2024)
- Budol Alert (March 17, 2024—October 20, 2024)
- MoJo: Mukha ng Balita (March 18, 2024—present)
- Recipes of Love (March 31, 2024—May 26, 2024)
- My Guardian Alien (April 1, 2024—June 28, 2024)
- Top 5: Mga Kwentong Marc Logan (April 6, 2024—present)
- Kapatid Mo, Idol Raffy Tulfo (April 7, 2024—present)
- Frontline Express (April 8, 2024—present)
- Lumuhod Ka Sa Lupa (April 8, 2024—May 2, 2025)
- Julius Babao Unplugged (April 13, 2024—present)
- Health @ Home (April 27, 2024—present)
- Sentro Balita Weekend (April 27, 2024—present)
- Sagot Kita (May 1, 2024—May 1, 2024)
- Shoutout (May 1, 2024—May 1, 2026)
- Eat's Fun (May 5, 2024—present)
- The B Side (May 10, 2024—present)
- Artsy Craftsy (May 11, 2024—present)
- My Mother, My Story (May 12, 2024—October 27, 2024)
- High Street (May 13, 2024—August 30, 2024)
- Pinoy Pawnstars (May 17, 2024—September 13, 2024)
- Marites University (May 18, 2024—October 19, 2024)
- Unity League (May 20, 2024—September 1, 2024)
- Larry Gadon Live (May 29, 2024—present)
- RDR Talks (June 2, 2024—August 18, 2024)
- Ate Rose: Real Life Stories (June 8, 2024—July 13, 2024)
- Padyak Princess (June 10, 2024—September 27, 2024)
- Motorcycle Republic (June 15, 2024—present)
- Pamilya Sagrado (June 17, 2024—November 15, 2024)
- Doctor, Next Door (June 22, 2024—present)
- Gretchen Ho Reports (June 23, 2024—present)
- TV Patrol Express (July 1, 2024—present)
- Widows' War (July 1, 2024—January 17, 2025)
- Klinika 630 (July 1, 2024—May 30, 2025)
- Headline sa Hapon (July 1, 2024—present)
- Wil To Win (July 14, 2024—April 25, 2025)
- Rainbow Rumble (July 20, 2024—April 12, 2026)
- Ang Senado ng Pilipinas (July 21, 2024—present)
- Pulang Araw (July 29, 2024—December 27, 2024)
- Young Guns on the Move (August 8, 2024—November 14, 2024)
- The Other Office (August 20, 2024—present)
- Manila Conversations (August 21, 2024—present)
- Lavender Fields (September 2, 2024—January 17, 2025)
- The Lifestyle Lab (September 7, 2024—present)
- Basta Enerhiya, Sagot Kita! (September 8, 2024—November 2, 2025)
- Shining Inheritance (September 9, 2024—January 10, 2025)
- Agenda (September 9, 2024—present)
- At the Forefront (September 9, 2024—present)
- Basis Points (September 9, 2024—January 17, 2025)
- Follow the Money (September 9, 2024—present)
- Industry Beacon (September 9, 2024—February 7, 2025)
- It's a Beautiful Day (September 9, 2024—July 11, 2025)
- NewsFeed @ Noon (September 9, 2024—August 8, 2025)
- NewsFeed (September 9, 2024—present)
- Pathways to Success (September 9, 2024—January 17, 2025)
- The Scorecard (September 9, 2024—present)
- Usapang Bilyonaryo (September 9, 2024—present)
- Weather HQ (September 9, 2024—December 13, 2025)
- Maka (September 21, 2024—August 16, 2025)
- Ang Himala ni Niño (September 30, 2024—April 11, 2025)
- Kwatro Kantos (October 5, 2024—December 28, 2024)
- Diskarteng Megamilyonaryo (October 12, 2024—present)
- One Balita Bai (October 12, 2024—present)
- Keep the Faith: Daily Mass with the Jesuits (October 13, 2024—present)
- World NewsFeed (October 14, 2024—December 20, 2024)
- Forever Young (October 21, 2024—February 21, 2025)
- Quizmosa (October 21, 2024—January 18, 2025)
- Balitang Pambansa (October 21, 2024—May 16, 2025)
- Heart World (October 26, 2024—January 25, 2025)
- Weekend Agenda (October 27, 2024—present)
- Lutong Bahay (October 28, 2024—March 28, 2025)
- On Point with Pinky Webb (October 28, 2024—present)
- Lakbay Tugon: Presidential Help Desk (November 3, 2024—December 15, 2024)
- Ted Failon at DJ Chacha sa True FM (November 4, 2024—present)
- True FM Balita Pilipinas (November 4, 2024—May 1, 2026)
- Face to Face: Harapan (November 11, 2024—March 13, 2026)
- Spotlight (November 16, 2024—present)
- Dami Mong Alam, Kuya Kim! (November 30, 2024—present)
- Pinoy Big Brother: Gen 11 Big 4 Ever (December 9, 2024—January 24, 2025)
- Mga Batang Riles (January 6, 2025—June 20, 2025)
- Arangkada Balita (January 6, 2025—present)
- My Ilonggo Girl (January 13, 2025—March 20, 2025)
- Prinsesa ng City Jail (January 13, 2025–June 21, 2025)
- Lolong: Bayani ng Bayan (January 20, 2025—June 13, 2025)
- Incognito (January 20, 2025—July 18, 2025)
- Congress News (January 20, 2025—present)
- How to Spot a Red Flag (January 27, 2025—February 28, 2025)
- All TV News: Mabilis Lang 'To (February 6, 2025—January 1, 2026)
- Binibining Marikit (February 10, 2025—June 27, 2025)
- Radyo Publiko Serbisyo (February 10, 2025—present)
- Trade Talks (February 10, 2025—present)
- Money Talks with Cathy Yang (February 10, 2025—present)
- Morning Matters (February 10, 2025—present)
- News & Views (February 10, 2025—present)
- Science Pinas (February 15, 2025—present)
- Stars Under Pressure (February 16, 2025—present)
- Sine Saya (February 23, 2025—present)
- Filipino at Heart (February 23, 2025—May 18, 2025)
- Mommy Dearest (February 24, 2025—July 18, 2025)
- COMELEC Usapang Halalan (March 1, 2025—June 21, 2025)
- Lutong Pinasarap (March 2, 2025—present)
- Saving Grace (March 3, 2025—June 20, 2025)
- Pag-Usapan Natin (March 3, 2025—present)
- Kandidato (March 10, 2025—May 2, 2025)
- Pay it Forward with Maricar Bautista (March 17, 2025—present)
- Slay (March 24, 2025—June 13, 2025)
- Mindanow Network Hour (March 24, 2025—present)
- Abogado (April 3, 2025—present)
- Kalye Sining (April 5, 2025—present)
- D8TV News: Balitang Balita (April 14—June 20, 2025)
- Kwatro Alas (April 26, 2025—present)
- Sayanista (April 27, 2025—present)
- Politiko Talks (April 27, 2025—present)
- Totoy Bato (May 5, 2025—April 24, 2026)
- FPJ sa G! Flicks (May 16, 2025—present)
- Frontline Express Sabado (May 17, 2025—present)
- Una sa Lahat (May 19, 2025—present)
- Ang Mutya ng Section E (May 19, 2025—July 18, 2025)
- Bini Versus (May 28, 2025—July 16, 2025)
- Bilyonaryo Quiz B (May 31, 2025—September 13, 2025)
- Alam Na Dis! (June 2, 2025—present)
- Ronda Pasada (June 2, 2025—present)
- Tandem ng Bayan (June 2, 2025—present)
- Maaram (June 14, 2025—October 25, 2025)
- Point of View (June 15, 2025—present)
- Encantadia Chronicles: Sang'gre (June 16, 2025—May 8, 2026)
- Sins of the Father (June 23, 2025—November 21, 2025)
- My Father's Wife (June 23, 2025—October 11, 2025)
- Sanggang-Dikit FR (June 23, 2025—January 30, 2026)
- D8TV News Alert (June 23, 2025—present)
- Idol Kids Philippines (June 28, 2025—September 28, 2025)
- Stars on the Floor (June 28, 2025—present)
- Akusada (June 30, 2025—October 31, 2025)
- Frontline Express AM (June 30, 2025—present)
- Beauty Empire (July 7, 2025—October 2, 2025)
- Cine Cinco sa Hapon (July 14, 2025—March 6, 2026)
- Beautiful Day (July 14, 2025—December 12, 2025)
- Seducing Drake Palma (July 21, 2025—October 3, 2025)
- It's Okay to Not Be Okay (July 21, 2025—October 17, 2025)
- Cruz vs Cruz (July 21, 2025—January 17, 2026)
- PinaSigla! (August 2, 2025—present)
- Sessions with Brian Yamsuan (August 8, 2025—present)
- Vibe (August 10, 2025—present)
- Vibe Nights (August 11, 2025—present)
- Vibe Up (August 11, 2025—March 6, 2026)
- The Daily Dish (August 11, 2025—present)
- Vibe TV (August 16, 2025—February 28, 2026)
- Basta Batas (August 16, 2025—present)
- Money Masters (August 16, 2025—present)
- Aksyon DOLE sa DZMM (August 30, 2025—December 27, 2025)
- Kwento Nights (September 1, 2025—present)
- Para sa Isa't Isa (September 13, 2025—February 21, 2026)
- Divina Law (September 13, 2025—present)
- Treze sa Tanghali (September 15, 2025—present)
- PRTV News Break (September 15, 2025—present)
- Politiko Nightly (September 22, 2025—present)
- Rampa (September 23, 2025—present)
- The PH Insider (September 26, 2025—present)
- Unscripted (September 27, 2025—present)
- Pit Stop Pinas (October 4, 2025—present)
- Straight Shot (October 4, 2025—present)
- Love on the Clock (October 11, 2025—November 29, 2025)
- Hating Kapatid (October 13, 2025—March 21, 2026)
- With Due Respect (October 19, 2025—present)
- What Lies Beneath (October 20, 2025—April 1, 2026)
- Philippine Bay Watch (October 25, 2025—present)
- The Spokes (October 27, 2025—present)
- Beyond the Game (October 29, 2025—present)
- TV Patrol Regional (November 2, 2025—May 10, 2026)
- Tech Bytes (November 18, 2025—present)
- Presinto 5 (second incarnation) (November 23, 2025—present)
- Roja (November 24, 2025—March 13, 2026)
- Balitaktakan: Tinig ng Kinabukasan (December 6, 2025—present)
- House At Your Service (December 13, 2025—present)
- 13 News (December 15, 2025—present)
- Cine Cinco Primetime (January 2, 2026—January 16, 2026)
- House of Lies (January 19, 2026—May 22, 2026)
- Wilyonaryo (January 25, 2026—May 15, 2026)
- Never Say Die (February 2, 2026—May 22, 2026)
- Ang Maging Pilipino (May 11, 2026—present)
- D8TV All Access (March 8, 2026—present)
- Game Room (November 4, 2024—present)
- Kawangga Warriors (February 8, 2026—present)
- Kwento Juan (June 14, 2026—present)
- Metro Escape (February 2, 2026—present)
- Pasyal Tayo (February 2, 2026—present)
- Radyo Drama sa TV (February 2, 2026—present)
- Walang Bola, Puro Tama (February 2, 2026—present)
- Perfect Mornings (February 2, 2026—present)
- Tara, Food Trip (February 3, 2026—present)
- Agapay: Tatak Rosa Rosal (February 4, 2026—present)
- Jazz Girls (February 5, 2026—present)
- All About Dogs with Jamie (February 14, 2026—present)
- Treze Express (February 16, 2026—present)
- Shift Happens (February 23, 2026—present)
- Apoy sa Dugo (March 2, 2026—June 19, 2026)
- The Secrets of Hotel 88 (March 2, 2026—June 26, 2026)
- Pasada Balita (March 2, 2026—present)
- In Converzation (March 7, 2026—present)
- Mari-Tres (March 7, 2026—present)
- Tulay Pilipino (March 9, 2026—present)
- D8 Patrol (March 9, 2026—present)
- Good Stories (March 14, 2026—present)
- Face to Face with Ate Koring (March 16, 2026—present)
- The Alibi (March 16, 2026—July 24, 2026)
- Walang Bolahan (March 21, 2026—present)
- Born to Shine (March 23, 2026—present)
- GMA News Bulletin (April 2, 2026—present)
- Blood vs Duty (April 6, 2026—July 24, 2026)
- Power Shift (April 8, 2026—present)
- Alam Mo Dapat! (April 10, 2026—present)
- Public Matters (April 10, 2026—present)
- Matteo G. Primetime (April 11, 2026—present)
- Treze Mornings (April 13, 2026—present)
- Naked Minds (April 17, 2026—present)
- Go Rampa with Me (April 19, 2026—present)
- Wellness is Wealth (April 19, 2026—present)
- Ogie Diaz Inspires (April 25, 2026—present)
- Roomies (April 25, 2026—present)
- Boarding Haus (April 26, 2026—present)
- A Secret in Prague (April 27, 2026—October 2, 2026)
- My Bespren Emman (April 27, 2026—present)
- Voices of Hope (April 29, 2026—present)
- TrendJing (May 2, 2026—present)
- Metro Morning (May 4, 2026—present)
- Memo (May 4, 2026—present)
- Midday Report (May 4, 2026—present)
- Unpopular Opinion (May 4, 2026—present)
- Balita Alas Tres (May 4, 2026—present)
- LSS: Love Stories & Songs (May 4, 2026—present)
- True Confessions (May 4, 2026—present)
- Hawak Mo Ang Beat: Legis Recap (May 7, 2026—present)
- The Master Cutter (May 11, 2026—present)
- ASAP XP (May 17, 2026—present)
- Project Loki (May 23, 2026—present)
- Kumusta (May 24, 2026—June 28, 2026)
- Kamao (May 25, 2026—present)
- Taskforce Firewall (May 25, 2026—present)
- You're My Favorite Song (June 22, 2026—July 31, 2026)
- Sigabo (June 22, 2026—present)
- Blockbusters sa Umaga (June 29, 2026—present)
- Oh My Gan! (June 29, 2026—present)
- The Singing Lodi (July 5, 2026—present)
- Sagot ni Doc (July 11, 2026—present)
- Dapat Legal (July 11, 2026—present)
- Ibang Level 'To! (July 25, 2026—present)
- Someone, Someday (July 27, 2026—present)

== See also ==
- Category:Philippine television series debuts by decade
