= Reaksyon =

- Also known as: Reaksyon kasama si Luchi Cruz-Valdes
- Created by: TV5 Network Inc.
- Developed by: News5
- Directed by: Benedict Carlos
- Presented by: Luchi Cruz-Valdes
- Country of origin: Philippines
- Original language: Tagalog

Production
- Executive producers: Ana Puod; Leo James Conde
- Camera setup: multicamera setup
- Running time: 15 minutes

Original release
- Network: TV5
- Release: August 13, 2012 – November 3, 2017

Related
- Agenda with Cito Beltran; Journo; Usapang Real Life

Reaksyon (transl. reaction) is a Philippine television news magazine show broadcast by TV5. Hosted by Luchi Cruz-Valdes, it aired from August 13, 2012 to November 3, 2017, replacing Wanted, Journo, Anggulo, Insider and Bitag.

This program airs every Monday, Wednesday and Friday from 10:30 to 10:45pm and every Tuesday and Thursday from 10:45 to 11:00pm. (PST) after Aksyon Tonite. The show aired on TV5 and simulcast on AksyonTV and on radio through Radyo5 92.3 News FM.

It is also have a short-lived weekend edition hosted by Martin Andanar from August to November 2012, replacing Tutok Tulfo and USI: Under Special Investigation.

== Background ==
News5 gives birth to a new genre in broadcasting with Reaksyon, a news magazine and public affairs segment that will widen people's knowledge of the news through in-depth reports and first hand insights from a mix of young and seasoned journalists of the news organization led by Luchi Cruz-Valdes.

This program delivers a brief but broad look at stories through exposés, and easy-to-digest investigative reports. Consistent with its name, Reaksyon also hears both sides of the story, and equally important, hears viewers’ insights on every issue being presented.

Reaksyon briefly ceased airing on July 18, 2014 as it morphed as an segment of newly reformatted Aksyon Prime, in which Valdes will be the anchor, but it resumed its airing on November 3, and its segment on the newscast is now aired as Reaksyon Agad, a preview for the latest Reaksyon episode.

The program had its last episode after 5 years on November 3, 2017 as part of ESPN 5's upcoming expansion.

== Hosts ==
=== Main host ===
- Luchi Cruz-Valdes

=== Substitute hosts ===
- Ed Lingao
- Cheryl Cosim
- Lourd de Veyra

=== Former hosts ===
- Martin Andanar (2012, Reaksyon Weekend)
- Erwin Tulfo (2016, substitute host for Valdez)

== Former segments ==
- FYI: For Your Information - trivia
- Ano ang Reaksyon Mo? - editorials

== Accolades ==
- Best Public Affairs Program - 12th Gawad Tanglaw Awards
