= Luchi Cruz-Valdes =

Filipina journalist

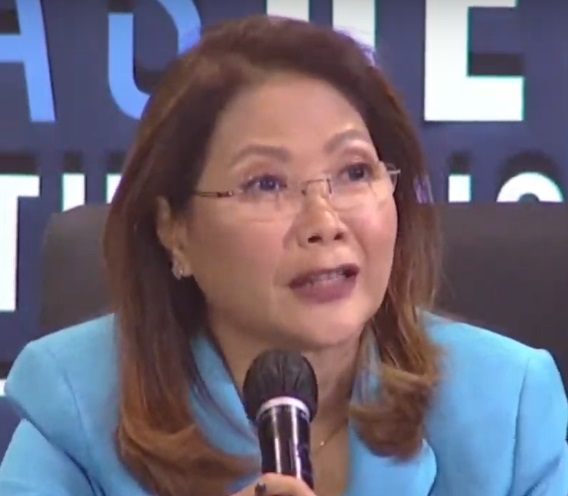
- Born: Luisita Cruz
- Education: University of the Philippines Diliman
- Occupations: Journalist; presenter
- Years active: 1982–2024

Luisita "Luchi" Cruz-Valdes (Tagalog: [ˈlutʃɪ ˈkɾus bɐlˈdɛs]) is a Filipino broadcast journalist formerly affiliated with GMA News and Public Affairs and now News5 and ABS-CBN News and Current Affairs. She was formerly the chief of News5, the news and public affairs department of TV5.

== Life and career ==
Cruz-Valdes earned her degree in broadcast communication at the University of the Philippines Diliman (UP Diliman), and became a radio and television reporter and producer. She is married to Lito Valdes, an IT marketing manager. They have three children.

Cruz-Valdes joined ABC News as a production assistant when it set up a Manila bureau for the 1986 snap presidential election. After her ABC stint, Cruz-Valdes was hired by Cheche Lazaro when ABS-CBN reopened after president Corazon Aquino was sworn into office.

For 10 years, she was a co-host of The Probe Team with Lazaro, founder and producer of the program, and also Cruz-Valdes' professor in UP. She proceeded to become part of the GMA News and Public Affairs for three years before accepting the offer of rival network ABS-CBN to become its vice president for news production and current affairs in 2001.

Soon after she left her post at GMA 7, the network filed cases of breach of contract and injunction against Cruz-Valdes, which prevented her from working in ABS-CBN from December 28, 2001, to August 20, 2002. In July 2008, the Quezon City Regional Trial Court judge Tita Marilyn Villordon dismissed the cases and ordered GMA Network to pay its former employee damages equivalent to the salary that Cruz-Valdes should have earned during her eight-month "forced" vacation.

Also in 2008, Cruz-Valdes was placed under preventive suspension pending the outcome of an internal matter, which ABS-CBN Corporate Communications head Bong Osorio described as "not merely a petty personal difference or simple administrative concern."

In November of the same year, Cruz-Valdes submitted her resignation. In 2010, she joined News5 as its news chief.

One of her notable roles in joining TV5 is moderating the 2nd leg of PiliPinas Debates 2016. On September 27, 2024, she stepped down as News5 and Public Affairs department chief following her retirement after 15 years of service. Before this, she make her return to RPN-9, where her journalist career began as a newscaster on NewsWatch in 1982, and also which using the Channel 9 frequency previously held by Cruz-Valdes' second employers ABS-CBN, through a simulcast of TV5's Frontline Pilipinas on RPTV since July 1, 2024.

== Filmography ==
=== Television ===
Year	Title	Role
1982	NewsWatch	Co-host
1986	Magandang Umaga Po	Co-host
1995–2001	Saksi	Substitute news anchor
1999–2001	i-Witness	Host
2002–2004	Special Assignment	Host
2010	Dokumentado	Host
2010–2012	Journo	Host
2011–2012	Anggulo	Host
2012–2017	Reaksyon	Host
2014	Yaman ng Bayan	Host
2014–2016	Kaya	Host
2014–2020	Aksyon	News Anchor
2016	PiliPinas Debates 2016	Debate Moderator
2017	Manindigan	Host
2019–2024	The Chiefs	Host
2020–2024	Frontline Pilipinas	Deretsahan Segment Anchor
2020–2021	Usapang Real Life	Host
2022	PiliPinas Debates 2022	Debate Moderator
2024	Budol Alert	Host

=== Radio ===
Year	Title	Role
2010–2017	Relasyon	Host

== Awards and Recognitions ==
Catholic Mass Media Awards

- Titus Brandsma Award for Excellence in Journalism

KBP Golden Dove (Kapisanan ng mga Brodkaster sa Pilipinas)

- Broadcaster of the Year (2001)
- Best Female Newscaster (2015)
- Ka Doroy Broadcaster of the Year Award (2015)

New York Film and Television Festival

- 3 Silver and 3 Bronze Medals for Best Documentary

Inding-Indie Short Film Festival

- Most Outstanding Broadcaster Asian Media Award (2015)
- Pinakamapanuri at Pinagkakatiwalaang Brodkaster of the Year Award (2016)
