= Usapang Real Life =

Philippine talk show and news magazine

- Title card
- Also known as: Usapang Real Life with Luchi Cruz-Valdes
- Genre: Talk show News magazine
- Created by: ContentCows Company
- Developed by: Cignal TV; News5
- Written by: Elmer Gatchalian; Dennis A. Cortes; Arby B. Larano; A. Mendoza; Christopher Nocon
- Directed by: Nino Faustino; Raymund Boss Generoso
- Presented by: Luchi Cruz-Valdes
- Country of origin: Philippines
- Original language: Filipino
- No. of episodes: 22

Production
- Executive producers: Robert P. Galang; Wilma V. Galvante; Margie C. Natividad
- Producers: Perci M. Intalan; Vitto P. Lazatin; Guido R. Zaballero
- Camera setup: Multiple-camera setup
- Running time: 60 minutes (with commercials)
- Production companies: Cignal Entertainment; News5; ContentCows Company

Original release
- Network: TV5; Colours
- Release: August 15, 2020 – January 9, 2021

Related
- Journo; Reaksyon

Usapang Real Life (lit. 'Real Life Talk') is a Philippine talk show and news magazine broadcast by TV5, presented by veteran journalist Luchi Cruz-Valdes. The show premiered on August 15, 2020 on the network's Saturday primetime block at 9:00 pm, following Bangon Talentadong Pinoy and its international debut on Kapatid TV5 on November 7, 2020, albeit on a delayed basis. The talk-oriented program is a blocktime production of ContentCows Company, Inc. for TV5 and Cignal cable channel Colours, on which it airs the following evening as part of its weekend lineup.

== Host ==
- Luchi Cruz-Valdes

== Episodes ==
Season 1

No.	Original release date	Guests
1	August 15, 2020	KC Concepcion and Karen Davila
2	August 22, 2020	Christian Antolin, Richo Bautista, Jane de Leon, Marvin Fojas, Emman Nimedez and Zendee Rose Tenerefe
3	August 29, 2020	Alessandra de Rossi, Allan K., and Kim Idol
4	September 5, 2020	Catriona Gray, Allein Maliksi and Lyqa Maravilla
5	September 12, 2020	Korina Sanchez-Roxas
6	September 19, 2020	Vicki Belo and Hayden Kho, Pauleen Luna and Vic Sotto
7	September 26, 2020	Andi Eigenmann and Cristine Reyes
8	October 3, 2020	Claudine Barretto and Judy Ann Santos-Agoncillo
9	October 10, 2020	Zsa Zsa Padilla, Pokwang
10	October 17, 2020	Kim Atienza, Felicia Hung-Atienza, Richard Gomez and Lucy Torres-Gomez
11	October 24, 2020	Raffy Tulfo
12	October 31, 2020	Jessy Mendiola, Letisha Velasco
13	November 7, 2020	Benjie Paras, Empoy Marquez, Wally Bayola and Paolo Ballesteros
14	November 14, 2020	Joey De Leon and Jako De Leon
15	November 21, 2020	Ted Failon
16	November 28, 2020	Vilma Santos-Recto

== See also ==
- List of TV5 (Philippine TV network) original programming
- Kapatid Channel
