= Dokumentado =

- Genre: Tabloid news program Comedy
- Created by: Associated Broadcasting Company
- Developed by: News5
- Directed by: Bren Campos
- Starring: Patrick Paez
- Country of origin: Philippines
- Original language: Tagalog
- No. of episodes: 77

Production
- Executive producer: Mark Pitoc
- Running time: 30 minutes

Original release
- Network: TV5 (2010–2011); AksyonTV (2011–2013)
- Release: April 7, 2010 – August 31, 2011

Related
- Anggulo (TV5)

Dokumentado (lit. Documented) is a Philippine television news comedy show broadcast by TV5. Originally hosted by Luchi Cruz-Valdes, it aired from April 7, 2010 to August 31, 2011, replacing Spotlight TV and was replaced by Anggulo. Patrick Paez serve as the final hosts.

== Background ==
The TV show is about different personalities caught on act by reporters of News5. The format was somewhat similar to TMZ, except that it focuses more on politics rather than showbiz. It was first hosted by News5 head Luchi Cruz-Valdes. The reporters tell stories of different personalities in politics and showbiz.

In September 2010, Martin Andanar replaced Cruz-Valdes when the latter was assigned to host Journo. The show concluded its run on August 31, 2011.

On November 30, 2011, the show returned on AksyonTV as part of AksyonTV Originals with News5 Production head, Patrick Paez replacing Andanar.

== On-air staff ==
=== Final host ===
- Patrick Paez (2011–2013)

=== Previous ===
- Martin Andanar (2010–2011)
- Luchi Cruz-Valdes (2010)

== Segment Hosts/Reporters ==
=== News5 Reporters (frequent) ===
- Trish Roque
- Maeanne Los Baños
- MJ Marfori

=== Segment Producers ===
- Alvher Jade Depotado
- Fredierick Vocal
- Chris Osia
- Jovy Barangay

== See also ==
- List of TV5 (Philippine TV network) original programming
