= Anggulo =

- Genre: News
- Created by: Associated Broadcasting Company
- Developed by: News5
- Written by: Luz Rimban
- Directed by: Benedict Carlos; Kit Gallardo
- Presented by: Luchi Cruz-Valdes various correspondents
- Country of origin: Philippines
- Original language: Filipino
- No. of episodes: 48

Production
- Executive producer: Dani Mae Manuel
- Running time: 1 hour (AksyonTV); 30 minutes (TV5)

Original release
- Network: TV5
- Release: September 7, 2011 – August 1, 2012

Anggulo (English: Angle) is a Philippine television investigative journalism program broadcast by TV5. Hosted by Luchi Cruz-Valdes, it aired from September 7, 2011 to August 1, 2012, replacing Dokumentado. The program airs on Thursdays at 7:30-8:30 p.m. (PST) on AksyonTV and Wednesdays at 11:30pm-12:00 midnight (PST) on TV5.

== Format ==
The show focuses on different personalities in politics, showbiz and sports. It shows three different sides of the story and their everyday lives.

== Hosts ==
=== Main host ===
- Luchi Cruz-Valdes

=== Main correspondents ===
- Chi Bocobo
- Laila Chikadora
- Benjie Dorango
- Jove Francisco
- Maricel Halili
- Maeanne Los Baños
- Twink Macaraeg
- Roices Naguit-Sibal
- Ina Zara

== See also ==
- News5
- List of TV5 (Philippine TV network) original programming
- List of programs broadcast by One Sports
