= 33rd PMPC Star Awards for Television =

- Date: October 13, 2019; October 20, 2019 (Delayed Telecast)
- Location: Henry Lee Irwin Theater, Ateneo de Manila University, Quezon City
- Presented by: Philippine Movie Press Club
- Hosted by: Kathryn Bernardo; Kim Chiu; Enchong Dee; Robi Domingo

Television/radio coverage
- Network: ABS-CBN
- Produced by: Airtime Marketing Philippines, Inc.
- Directed by: Bert de Leon

The 33rd PMPC Star Awards for Television honored the best in Philippine television programming from 2018 until 2019, as chosen by the Philippine Movie Press Club. The ceremony will held on October 13, 2019, at the Henry Lee Irwin Theater in Ateneo de Manila University, Quezon City, and was aired in a delayed telecast by ABS-CBN on October 20, 2019. The ceremony was hosted by Kathryn Bernardo, Kim Chiu, Enchong Dee and Robi Domingo.

The nominations were announced by the Press on September 21, 2019.

== Winners and Nominees ==
Winners are listed first and highlighted in bold:

=== Networks ===
Best TV Station
- **ABS-CBN 2**
  - PTV 4
  - TV5
  - GMA 7
  - CNN Philippines 9
  - IBC 13
  - GMA News TV
  - Net 25
  - UNTV 37

=== Programs ===
Best Primetime Drama Series	Best Daytime Drama Series
**The General's Daughter (ABS-CBN 2)**; Cain at Abel (GMA 7); FPJ's Ang Probinsyano (ABS-CBN 2); Halik (ABS-CBN 2); Love You Two (GMA 7); Ngayon at Kailanman (ABS-CBN 2); Onanay (GMA 7); Sino ang Maysala?: Mea Culpa (ABS-CBN 2)	**Kadenang Ginto (ABS-CBN 2)**; Araw Gabi (ABS-CBN 2); Asawa Ko, Karibal Ko (GMA 7); Bihag (GMA 7); Dragon Lady (GMA 7); Los Bastardos (ABS-CBN 2); My Special Tatay (GMA 7); Nang Ngumiti ang Langit (ABS-CBN 2)
Best Drama Anthology	Best Horror/Fantasy Program
**Ipaglaban Mo (ABS-CBN 2)**; Dear Uge (GMA 7); Karelasyon (GMA 7); Magpakailanman (GMA 7); Tadhana (GMA 7); Wagas (GMA News TV 27)	**Daig Kayo ng Lola Ko (GMA 7)**; Hiwaga ng Kambat (ABS-CBN 2)
Best Comedy Show	Best Variety Show
**Banana Sundae (ABS-CBN 2)**; Daddy's Gurl (GMA 7); Goin' Bulilit (ABS-CBN 2); Hapi ang Buhay (Net 25); Hashtag Michael Angelo The Sitcom (GMA News TV); Home Sweetie Home: Extra Sweet (ABS-CBN 2); Pepito Manaloto (GMA 7)	**Sunday PinaSaya (GMA 7)**; ASK TV: Artihan, Sayawan at Kantahan (IBC 13); Bee Happy, Go Lucky! (Net 25); The Boobay and Tekla Show (GMA 7); It's Showtime (ABS-CBN 2); Wowowin (GMA 7)
Best Musical Variety Show	Best Talent Search Program
**SMAC Pinoy Ito! (IBC 13)**; **Young Once Upon A Time (Net 25)**; Letters and Music (Net 25); Studio 7 (GMA 7)	**The Clash (GMA 7)**; ASOP Music Festival (UNTV 37)
Best Celebrity Talk Show	Best News Program
**Tonight with Boy Abunda (ABS-CBN 2)**; Gandang Gabi Vice (ABS-CBN 2); Leading Women (CNN Philippines 9); Magandang Buhay (ABS-CBN 2); MOMents (Net 25); Profiles (CNN Philippines 9); Sarap, 'Di Ba? (GMA 7); Tonight with Arnold Clavio (GMA News TV)	**TV Patrol (ABS-CBN 2)**; 24 Oras (GMA 7); Aksyon (TV5); Balitaan (CNN Philippines); Balitanghali (GMA News TV); Bandila (ABS-CBN 2); Saksi (GMA 7); State of the Nation (GMA News TV)
Best Public Affairs Program	Best Morning Show
**The Bottomline with Boy Abunda (ABS-CBN 2)**; Bawal ang Pasaway kay Mareng Winnie (GMA News TV); Get It Straight with Daniel Razon (UNTV 37); Kasangga Mo Ang Langit (PTV 4); On the Record (CNN Philippines); Reaksyon (TV5); Sa Ganang Mamamayan (Net 25); The Source (CNN Philippines)	**Unang Hirit (GMA 7)**; Bagong Pilipinas (PTV 4); Good Morning Kuya (UNTV 37); Pambansang Almusal (Net 25); Umagang Kay Ganda (ABS-CBN 2)
Best Public Service Program	Best Documentary Program
**Healing Galing (TV5)**; Imbestigador (GMA 7); Mission Possible (ABS-CBN 2); My Puhunan (ABS-CBN 2); Red Alert (ABS-CBN 2); Salamat Dok (ABS-CBN 2); S.O.C.O.: Scene of the Crime Operatives (ABS-CBN 2); Wish Ko Lang (GMA 7)	**I-Witness (GMA 7)**; The Atom Araullo Specials (GMA 7); Brigada (GMA News TV); CNN Philippines Presents (CNN Philippines 9); Kuha Mo! (ABS-CBN 2); Local Legends (ABS-CBN 2); No Filter (ABS-CBN 2); Reel Time (GMA News TV)
Best Documentary Special	Best Magazine Show
**The Story of the Filipinos Protecting the Environment (CNN Philippines 9)**; ALAB (ABS-CBN 2); Ang Babae Ng Balangiga (ABS-CBN 2); Genuine Love (ABS-CBN 2); HIV Rising (ABS-CBN 2); Radical Love (ABS-CBN 2); Yaman Sa Kailaliman (PTV 4)	**Rated K (ABS-CBN 2)**; Ang Pinaka (GMA News TV); Biyaheng Langit (PTV 4); DOSTv (PTV 4); Good News Kasama si Vicky Morales (GMA News TV); IJuander (GMA News TV); Kapuso Mo, Jessica Soho (GMA 7); Negosyo Asenso (Net 25)
Best Travel Show	Best Lifestyle Show
**G Diaries (ABS-CBN 2)**; Biyahe ni Drew (GMA News TV); Buhay Pinoy (PTV 4); Cooltura (IBC 13); Landmarks (Net 25)	**The World of Gandang Ricky Reyes (GMA News TV)**; Glow Up (GMA News TV); How To Be You? (GMA News TV); Loving What You Do (GMA News TV); Taste Buddies (GMA News TV)
Best Educational Program	Best Children Show
**Matanglawin (ABS-CBN 2)**; AHA! (GMA 7); Born to Be Wild (GMA 7); Failon Ngayon (ABS-CBN 2); Idol sa Kusina (GMA News TV); Med Talk (CNN Philippines 9); Pinas Sarap (GMA News TV); Sports U (ABS-CBN 2)	**Talents Academy (IBC 13)**; Anong Say Nyo? (Net 25); Kid Kwento (Net 25); The KNC Show (UNTV 37)

=== Personalities ===
Best Drama Actor	Best Drama Actress
**Jericho Rosales on Halik (ABS-CBN 2)**; Dingdong Dantes on Cain at Abel (GMA 7); JM de Guzman on Araw Gabi (ABS-CBN 2); Joshua Garcia on Ngayon at Kailanman (ABS-CBN 2); Coco Martin on FPJ's Ang Probinsyano (ABS-CBN 2); Alden Richards on Victor Magtanggol (GMA 7); Dennis Trillo on Cain at Abel (GMA 7); Ronaldo Valdez on Los Bastardos (ABS-CBN 2)	**Angel Locsin on The General's Daughter (ABS-CBN 2)**; Nora Aunor on Onanay (GMA 7); Max Collins on Bihag (GMA 7); Beauty Gonzalez on Kadenang Ginto (ABS-CBN 2); Yasmien Kurdi on Hiram na Anak (GMA 7); Bela Padilla on Sino ang Maysala?: Mea Culpa (ABS-CBN 2); Dimples Romana on Kadenang Ginto (ABS-CBN 2); Jodi Sta. Maria on Sino ang Maysala?: Mea Culpa (ABS-CBN 2)
Best Drama Supporting Actor	Best Drama Supporting Actress
**Arjo Atayde on The General's Daughter (ABS-CBN 2)**; Paulo Avelino on The General's Daughter (ABS-CBN 2); Tirso Cruz III on The General's Daughter (ABS-CBN 2); Jameson Blake on Ngayon at Kailanman (ABS-CBN 2); John Estrada on Kara Mia (GMA 7); Baron Geisler on FPJ's Ang Probinsyano (ABS-CBN 2); Wendell Ramos on Onanay (GMA 7); Albert Martinez on The General's Daughter (ABS-CBN 2)	**Janice De Belen on The General's Daughter (ABS-CBN 2)**; Amy Austria on Halik (ABS-CBN 2); Iza Calzado on Ngayon at Kailanman (ABS-CBN 2); Alice Dixson on Ngayon at Kailanman (ABS-CBN 2); Yassi Pressman on FPJ's Ang Probinsyano (ABS-CBN 2); Susan Roces on FPJ's Ang Probinsyano (ABS-CBN 2); Maricel Soriano on The General's Daughter (ABS-CBN 2); Eula Valdez on The General's Daughter (ABS-CBN 2)
Best Single Performance by An Actor	Best Single Performance by An Actress
**Enchong Dee on Maalaala Mo Kaya: Wheelchair (ABS-CBN 2)**; **Jeric Gonzales on Magpakailanman: Male Sex Slave sa Saudi (GMA 7)**; Wally Bayola on Eat Bulaga! Lenten Special: Bulawan (GMA 7); Kiko Estrada on Maalaala Mo Kaya: Kadena (ABS-CBN 2); Joshua Garcia on Maalaala Mo Kaya: Medal of Valor (ABS-CBN 2); Zaijan Jaranilla on Maalaala Mo Kaya: Wheelchair (ABS-CBN 2); Alden Richards on Eat Bulaga! Lenten Special: Bulawan (GMA 7); Dennis Trillo on Magpakailanman: Patawad, Ama Ko (GMA 7)	**Yasmien Kurdi on Tadhana: Sukdulan (GMA 7)**; Irma Adlawan on Maalaala Mo Kaya: Passport (ABS-CBN 2); Joanna Ampil on Maalaala Mo Kaya: Kadena (ABS-CBN 2); Mary Joy Apostol on Ipaglaban Mo: Kakampi (ABS-CBN); Amy Austria on Maalaala Mo Kaya: Wheelchair (ABS-CBN 2); Janice de Belen on Maalaala Mo Kaya: Medal of Valor (ABS-CBN 2); Agot Isidro on Maalaala Mo Kaya: Passport (ABS-CBN 2); Shaina Magdayao on Maalaala Mo Kaya: Tubig (ABS-CBN 2)
Best Child Performer	Best New Male TV Personality
**Sophia Reola on Nang Ngumiti ang Langit (ABS-CBN 2)**; Euwenn Aleta on Cain at Abel (GMA 7); Raphael Landicho on Bihag (GMA 7); Krystal Mejes on Nang Ngumiti ang Langit (ABS-CBN 2); Kenken Nuyad on FPJ's Ang Probinsyano (ABS-CBN 2); JJ Quilantang on Playhouse (ABS-CBN 2); Nayomi Ramos on Nang Ngumiti ang Langit (ABS-CBN 2); Iyannah Sumalpong on Sino ang Maysala?: Mea Culpa (ABS-CBN 2); Miguel Vergara on Nang Ngumiti ang Langit (ABS-CBN 2)	**Aljon Mendoza on Maalaala Mo Kaya: Medal of Valor (ABS-CBN 2)**; **Klinton Start on Bee Happy, Go Lucky (Net 25)**; Joao Constancia on Ngayon at Kailanman (ABS-CBN 2); Emman Franc on Bagong Pilipinas (PTV 4); Seth Fedelin on Kadenang Ginto (ABS-CBN 2); Yamyam Gucong on Home Sweetie Home: Extra Sweet (ABS-CBN 2); JB Paguio on Bukas May Kahapon (IBC 13); Fumiya Sankai on Home Sweetie Home: Extra Sweet (ABS-CBN 2)
Best New Female TV Personality	Best Comedy Actor
**Ivana Alawi on Sino ang Maysala?: Mea Culpa (ABS-CBN 2)**; Jo Berry on Onanay (GMA 7); Herlene “Hipon Girl” Budol on Wowowin (GMA 7); Golden Cañedo on Studio 7 (GMA 7); Michelle Dee on Love You Two (GMA 7); Rayantha Leigh on Bee Happy, Go Lucky (Net 25); Pia Morato on PNA Newsroom (PTV 4); Sophia Reola on Nang Ngumiti ang Langit (ABS-CBN 2); Kylie Verzosa on Los Bastardos (ABS-CBN 2)	**Bayani Agbayani on Home Sweetie Home: Extra Sweet (ABS-CBN 2)**; Jobert Austria on Banana Sundae (ABS-CBN 2); Ryan Bang on Banana Sundae (ABS-CBN 2); Michael Angelo Lobrin on Hashtag Michael Angelo: The Sitcom (GMA News TV); Vhong Navarro on Home Sweetie Home: Extra Sweet (ABS-CBN 2); Vic Sotto on Daddy's Gurl (GMA 7); Luis Manzano on Home Sweetie Home: Extra Sweet (ABS-CBN 2); Michael V. on Pepito Manaloto (GMA 7)
Best Comedy Actress	Best Male TV Host
**Maine Mendoza on Daddy's Gurl (GMA 7)**; Alex Gonzaga on Home Sweetie Home: Extra Sweet (ABS-CBN 2); Toni Gonzaga on Home Sweetie Home: Extra Sweet (ABS-CBN 2); Angelica Panganiban on Banana Sundae (ABS-CBN 2); Pokwang on Banana Sundae (ABS-CBN 2); Manilyn Reynes on Pepito Manaloto (GMA 7); Chariz Solomon on Bubble Gang (GMA 7); Nova Villa on Pepito Manaloto (GMA 7)	**Vice Ganda on It's Showtime (ABS-CBN 2)**; Ogie Alcasid on ASAP Natin 'To (ABS-CBN 2); Luis Manzano on ASAP Natin 'To (ABS-CBN 2); Martin Nievera on ASAP Natin 'To (ABS-CBN 2); Piolo Pascual on ASAP Natin 'To (ABS-CBN 2); Willie Revillame on Wowowin (GMA 7); Vic Sotto on Eat Bulaga! (GMA 7); Gary Valenciano on ASAP Natin 'To (ABS-CBN 2)
Best Female TV Host	Best Talent Search Program Host
**Anne Curtis on It's Showtime (ABS-CBN 2)**; Sarah Geronimo on ASAP Natin 'To (ABS-CBN 2); Toni Gonzaga on ASAP Natin 'To (ABS-CBN 2); Pia Guanio on Eat Bulaga! (GMA 7); Maine Mendoza on Eat Bulaga! (GMA 7); Amy Perez on It's Showtime (ABS-CBN 2); Marian Rivera on Sunday PinaSaya (GMA 7); Regine Velasquez on ASAP Natin 'To (ABS-CBN 2)	**Luis Manzano and Pia Wurtzbach on World of Dance Philippines (ABS-CBN 2)**; Toni Rose Gayda and Richard Reynoso on ASOP Music Festival (UNTV 37); Regine Velasquez on The Clash (GMA 7)
Best Celebrity Talk Show Host	Best Male Newscaster
**Boy Abunda on Tonight with Boy Abunda (ABS-CBN 2)**; Mitzi Borromeo on Profiles (CNN Philippines 9); Melai Cantiveros, Karla Estrada and Jolina Magdangal on Magandang Buhay (ABS-CBN 2); Arnold Clavio on Tonight with Arnold Clavio (GMA News TV); Cassy Legaspi, Mavy Legaspi and Carmina Villarroel on Sarap, 'Di Ba? (GMA 7); Angel Jacob on Leading Women (CNN Philippines 9); Gladys Reyes on MOMents (Net 25); Vice Ganda on Gandang Gabi Vice (ABS-CBN 2)	**Raffy Tima on Balitanghali (GMA News TV)**; Julius Babao on Bandila (ABS-CBN 2); Arnold Clavio on Saksi (GMA 7); Noli de Castro on TV Patrol (ABS-CBN 2); Alvin Elchico on TV Patrol Weekend (ABS-CBN 2; Mike Enriquez on 24 Oras (GMA 7); Ted Failon on TV Patrol (ABS-CBN 2); Ivan Mayrina on 24 Oras Weekend (GMA 7)
Best Female Newscaster	Best Public Affairs Program Host
**Vicky Morales on 24 Oras (GMA 7)**; Pia Arcangel on Saksi (GMA 7); Luchi Cruz-Valdes on Aksyon (TV5); Karen Davila on Bandila (ABS-CBN 2); Bernadette Sembrano on TV Patrol (ABS-CBN 2); Jessica Soho on State of the Nation (GMA News TV); Mel Tiangco on 24 Oras (GMA 7); Pinky Webb on Balitaan (CNN Philippines 9)	**Boy Abunda on The Bottomline with Boy Abunda (ABS-CBN 2)**; Luchi Cruz-Valdes on Reaksyon (TV5); Pia Hontiveros on On the Record (CNN Philippines 9); Rey Langit ang JR Langit on Kasangga Mo Ang Langit (PTV 4); Rodante Marcoleta and Gen Subardiaga on Sa Ganang Mamamayan (Net 25); Winnie Monsod on Bawal ang Pasaway kay Mareng Winnie (GMA News TV); Daniel Razon on Get It Straight with Daniel Razon (UNTV 37); Pinky Webb on The Source (CNN Philippines 9)
Best Morning Show Host	Best Public Service Program Host
**Jorge Cariño, Winnie Cordero, Gretchen Ho, Amy Perez, Anthony Taberna and Ariel Ureta on Umagang Kay Ganda (ABS-CBN 2)**; Harris Acero, Peblles Antonio, Sarah Barba-Cabodil, Diego Castro III, Janis de Vera, Erica Honrado, Thalia Javier, Angela Lagunzad, Joseph Lee, Daniel Razon, Bong Santiago, Jun Soriao, Erin Tañada, Regie Tongol, Monica Verallo and Rheena Villamor on Good Morning Kuya (UNTV 37); Cezz Alvarez, Earlo Bringas, Nicole Facal, Julie Fernando, Kristel Fesalbon, Liza Flores, Genesis Gomez, Andrea Mendres, Ken Mesina, Marinell Ochoa and Phoebe Publico on Pambansang Almusal (Net 25); Love Añover, Pia Arcangel, Lyn Ching, Arnold Clavio, Nathaniel Cruz, Susan Enriquez, Suzie Entrata, Ivan Mayrina, Lhar Santiago and Connie Sison on Unang Hirit (GMA 7); Chichi Atienza Valdepenas, Fifi delos Santos, Jules Guiang, Dianne Medina, Karla Paderna, Anne Querrer on Bagong Pilipinas (PTV 4)	**Edinell Calvario on Healing Galing (TV5)**; Gus Abelgas on S.O.C.O.: Scene of the Crime Operatives (ABS-CBN 2); Julius Babao on Mission Possible (ABS-CBN 2); Jeff Canoy on Red Alert (ABS-CBN 2); Karen Davila on My Puhunan (ABS-CBN 2); Alvin Elchico and Bernadette Sembrano on Salamat Dok (ABS-CBN 2); Mike Enriquez on Imbestigador (GMA 7); Vicky Morales on Wish Ko Lang (GMA 7)
Best Documentary Program Host	Best Magazine Show Host
**William Thio on Spotlight (UNTV 37)**; Atom Araullo on The Atom Araullo Specials (GMA 7); Kara David on Brigada (GMA News TV); Abner Mercado on No Filter (ABS-CBN 2); Rhea Santos on Tunay Na Buhay (GMA 7); Anthony Taberna on Kuha Mo! (ABS-CBN 2); Raffy Tima on I-Witness (GMA 7); Pinky Webb on CNN Philippines Presents (CNN Philippines)	**Korina Sanchez on Rated K (ABS-CBN 2)**; Cesar Apolinario and Susan Enriquez on IJuander (GMA News TV); Rovilson Fernandez on Ang Pinaka (GMA News TV); Francis Garcia on Negosyo Asenso (Net 25); Rey Langit on Biyaheng Langit (PTV 4); Gel Miranda on DOSTv (PTV 4); Vicky Morales on Good News Kasama si Vicky Morales (GMA News TV); Jessica Soho on Kapuso Mo, Jessica Soho (GMA 7)
Best Travel Show Host	Best Lifestyle Show Host
**Indra Cepeda and Dolly Malgapo on Landmarks (Net 25)**; Drew Arellano on Biyahe ni Drew (GMA News TV); Kris Tiffany Janson and Pat Natividad on Cooltura (IBC 13); Gina Lopez on G Diaries (ABS-CBN 2); Jaime Santos and Patty Santos on Buhay Pinoy (PTV 4)	**Ricky Reyes on The World of Gandang Ricky Reyes (GMA News TV)**; Gil Cuerva and Solenn Heussaff on Taste Buddies (GMA News TV); Michelle Dee, Winwyn Marquez and Thia Thomalla on Glow Up (GMA News TV); Will Devaughn and Diana Zubiri on How To Be You? (GMA News TV); Dianne Medina on Loving What You Do (GMA News TV)
Best Educational Program Host	Best Children Show Host
**Kim Atienza on Matanglawin (ABS-CBN 2)**; Drew Arellano on AHA! (GMA 7); Dyan Castillejo on Sports U (ABS-CBN 2); Dingdong Dantes on Amazing Earth (GMA 7); Kara David on Pinas Sarap (GMA News TV); Nielsen Donato and Ferdie Recio on Born to Be Wild (GMA 7); Ted Failon on Failon Ngayon (ABS-CBN 2); Boy Logro and Chynna Ortaleza on Idol sa Kusina (GMA News TV)	**Fred Lorinz Bacay, Janella Glissman, Zandi Gabriel Miranda and Anastacia Paronda on Talents Academy (IBC 13)**; Christian Luke Alarcon, Eric Cabobos, Percida Capulong, Kimberly Enriquez, Christian Daniel Isip, Leane Manalanzan, Lexter Manalanzan, Liana Rose Manalanzan, Marcos Joaquin Paler, David Soriano, Angelica Tejana and Bency Braine Vallo on The KNC Show (UNTV 37); Dj Albert on Anong Say Nyo? (Net 25); Sally Lopez on Kid Kwento (Net 25)

== Special awards ==
=== Ading Fernando Lifetime Achievement Award ===
- Kris Aquino

=== Excellence in Broadcasting Lifetime Achievement Award ===
- Ralph Obina (Male)
- Vicky Morales (Female)

=== German Moreno Power Tandem Award ===
- Edward Barber and Maymay Entrata
- Ken Chan and Rita Daniela

=== Posthumous Award for Television Excellence ===
- Gina Lopez

=== Posthumous Award as Icon Philippine TV ===
- Eddie Garcia

=== Celebrity Mom of the Night ===
- Dimples Romana

=== Celebrity Skin Magical of the Night ===
- Edward Barber (Male)
- Dimples Romana (Female)

=== Frontrow International Celebrity of the Night ===
- Edward Barber (Male)
- Ariella Arida (Female)

=== TV Queens at the Turn of the Millennium ===
- Carla Abellana
- Bea Alonzo
- Kathryn Bernardo
- Kim Chiu
- Sunshine Dizon
- Heart Evangelista
- Angel Locsin
- Jennylyn Mercado
- Marian Rivera
- Maja Salvador
- Judy Ann Santos
- Liza Soberano

== Most major nominations ==
Nominations by Network
Nominations	Network
135	ABS-CBN 2
77	GMA 7
35	GMA News TV
21	Net 25
15	CNN Philippines 9
14	PTV 4
10	UNTV 37
8	IBC 13
7	TV5

== Most major wins ==
Wins by Network
Wins	Network
28	ABS-CBN 2
9	GMA 7
3	IBC 13
3	Net 25
3	GMA News TV
2	TV5
1	CNN Philippines
1	UNTV 37

== Performers ==
Name(s)	Performed
Kaori Oinuma; Andre Brouillette; Lou Yanong; Ashley del Mundo; Bayani Agbayani; Ariella Arida; Lassy Marquez; Aljur Abrenica; Elisse Joson; McCoy de Leon; Jameson Blake; CK Kieron; Paulo Angeles; Jackque Gonzaga; Julia Gonowon; PHD Dancers	I Don't Care by Ed Sheeran and Justin Bieber; Kahit Ayaw Mo Na by This Band; Buwan by Juan Karlos Labajo; Humanap Ka Ng Panget by Andrew E. Rewrite the Stars by Zac Efron and Zendaya; Love Shot by Exo; Boy with Luv by BTS featuring Halsey
TNT Boys; J.E.Z.	Could You Be Messiah by Gary Valenciano; To Where You Are by Josh Groban; In My Life by The Beatles
Christian Bautista; Erik Santos	Queen of My Heart by Westlife

== See also ==
- PMPC Star Awards for TV
- 2019 in Philippine television
