= 35th PMPC Star Awards for Television =

Philippine television award show held in 2023

- Date: January 28, 2023
- Location: Winford Manila Resort and Casino
- Presented by: Philippine Movie Press Club
- Hosted by: Pops Fernandez; Aiko Melendez; John Estrada

Television/radio coverage
- Network: JAMSAP Entertainment Corporation YouTube Channel
- Produced by: JAMSAP Entertainment Corporation
- Directed by: Frank Lloyd Mamaril

The 35th PMPC Star Awards for Television honors the best in Philippine television programming from 2020 to 2021, as chosen by the Philippine Movie Press Club. The ceremony was held at the Winford Manila Resort and Casino on January 28, 2023. This is the first time in the history of the award-giving body that it has skipped the 4th Quarter of the previous year. The ceremony was hosted by Pops Fernandez, Aiko Melendez and John Estrada.

The nominations were announced by the Press on January 15, 2023.

== Winners and Nominees ==
Winners are listed first and highlighted in bold:

=== Networks ===
Best TV Station
- **GMA 7**
  - TV5
  - PTV 4
  - CNN Philippines 9
  - A2Z 11
  - IBC 13
  - Net 25
  - GTV 27
  - UNTV 37

=== Programs ===
Best Primetime Drama Series	Best Daytime Drama Series
**Huwag Kang Mangamba (A2Z 11/TV5)**; Ang sa Iyo ay Akin (A2Z/TV5); First Yaya (GMA 7); FPJ's Ang Probinsyano (A2Z 11/TV5); Init sa Magdamag (A2Z 11/TV5); La Vida Lena (A2Z 11/TV5); Niña Niño (TV5); Owe My Love (GMA 7); Paano ang Pangako? (TV5)	**Prima Donnas (GMA 7)**; Ang Dalawang Ikaw (GMA 7); Babawiin Ko Ang Lahat (GMA 7); Bagong Umaga (A2Z 11); Bilangin ang Bituin Sa Langit (GMA 7)
Best Drama Anthology	Best Drama Mini Series
**Magpakailanman (GMA 7)**; Tadhana (GMA 7); Wagas (GTV 27)	**Agimat ng Agila (GMA 7)**; **He's Into Her (A2Z 11)**; Ang Daigdig Ko'y Ikaw (Net 25); Gen Z (TV5); I Can See You: High-Rise (GMA 7); I Can See You: Love on the Balcony (GMA 7); I Can See You: The Lookout (GMA 7); I Can See You: Truly. Madly (GMA 7)
Best Horror/Fantasy Program	Best Comedy Show
**Daig Kayo Ng Lola Ko (GMA 7)**; My Fantastic Pag-ibig (GTV 27)	**Pepito Manaloto (GMA 7)**; Daddy's Gurl (GMA 7); Kesayasaya (Net 25); Oh My Dad! (TV5)
Best Variety Show	Best Musical Variety Show
**All-Out Sundays (GMA 7)**; Happy Time (Net 25); It's Showtime (A2Z 11); Lunch Out Loud (TV5); The Boobay and Tekla Show (GMA 7); Wowowin (GMA 7)	**Letters and Music (Net 25)**; Himig Ng Lahi (Net 25); Sunday Noontime Live (TV5); Young Once Upon A Time (Net 25)
Best Talent Search Program	Best Celebrity Talk Show
**The Clash (GMA 7)**; Sing Galing (TV5); Tagisan Ng Galing (Net 25)	**Magandang Buhay (A2Z 11)**; Helen's Kitchen (TV5); Mars Pa More (GMA 7); Moments (Net 25); Profile (CNN Philippines 9); Sarap, 'Di Ba? (GMA 7)
Best News Program	Best Public Affairs Program
**24 Oras (GMA 7)**; Balitaan (CNN Philippines 9); Balitanghali (GTV 27); Frontline Pilipinas (TV5); PTV News Tonight (PTV 4); Saksi (GMA 7); State of the Nation (GTV 27)	**Open for Business (Net 25)**; The Exchange with Rico Hizon (CNN Philippines 9); On the Record (CNN Philippines 9); Politics As Usual (CNN Philippines 9); Sa Ganang Mamamayan (Net 25); The Source with Pinky Webb (CNN Philippines 9); Sports Desk (CNN Philippines 9)
Best Morning Show	Best Public Service Program
**Unang Hirit (GMA 7)**; Good Morning Kuya (UNTV 37); Pambansang Almusal (Net 25); Rise and Shine Pilipinas (PTV 4)	**Wish Ko Lang (GMA 7)**; Healing Galing (UNTV 37); Imbestigador (GMA 7); Laging Handa Public Briefing (PTV 4)
Best Documentary Program	Best Documentary Special
**i-Witness (GMA 7)**; Brigada (GTV 27); CNN Philippines Presents (CNN Philippines 9); Reporter's Notebook (GMA 7); The Atom Araullo Specials (GMA 7); Tunay Na Buhay (GMA 7)	**Mukha ng Pandemya (PTV 4)**; Paalam PNoy (CNN Philippines 9)
Best Magazine Show	Best Lifestyle Show
**Kapuso Mo, Jessica Soho (GMA 7)**; Good News Kasama si Vicky Morales (GTV 27); iJuander (GTV 27); Rated Korina (TV5)	**Taste Buddies (GTV 27)**; Glow Up (GTV 27); Loving What You Do (GTV 27)
Best Educational Program	Best Children Show
**Born to Be Wild (GMA 7)**; AHA! (GMA 7); Farm to Table (GTV 27); MedTalk Health Talk (CNN Philippines 9); Pinas Sarap (GTV 27); Unlad: Kaagapay Sa Buhay (Net 25)	**Talents Academy (IBC 13)**; Anong Say Nyo? (Net 25); Artime (Net 25); Be Brighter (Net 25); Kid Kwento (Net 25)

=== Personalities ===
Best Drama Actor	Best Drama Actress
**JM de Guzman on Init sa Magdamag (A2Z 11/TV5)**; Gerald Anderson on Init sa Magdamag (A2Z 11/TV5); Carlo Aquino on La Vida Lena (A2Z 11/TV5); Noel Comia Jr. on Niña Niño (TV5); Gabby Concepcion on First Yaya (GMA 7); JC de Vera on La Vida Lena (A2Z 11/TV5); Coco Martin on FPJ's Ang Probinsyano (A2Z 11/TV5); Sam Milby on Ang sa Iyo ay Akin (A2Z 11/TV5); Kelvin Miranda on The Lost Recipe (GMA 7)	**Jodi Sta. Maria on Ang sa Iyo ay Akin (A2Z 11/TV5)**; Iza Calzado on Ang sa Iyo ay Akin (A2Z 11/TV5); Yam Concepcion on Init sa Magdamag (A2Z 11/TV5); Erich Gonzales on La Vida Lena (A2Z 11/TV5); Sanya Lopez on First Yaya (GMA 7); Heaven Peralejo on Bagong Umaga (A2Z 11); Lovi Poe on Owe My Love (GMA 7); Maja Salvador on Niña Niño (TV5)
Best Drama Supporting Actor	Best Drama Supporting Actress
**John Estrada on Babawiin Ko Ang Lahat (GMA 7)**; John Arcilla on FPJ's Ang Probinsyano (A2Z 11/TV5); Raymond Bagatsing on La Vida Lena (A2Z 11/TV5); Michael de Mesa on FPJ's Ang Probinsyano (A2Z 11/TV5); Enchong Dee on Huwag Kang Mangamba (A2Z 11/TV5); Jaime Fabregas on FPJ's Ang Probinsyano (A2Z 11/TV5); Richard Gutierrez on FPJ's Ang Probinsyano (A2Z 11/TV5); Kristoffer Martin on Babawiin Ko Ang Lahat (GMA 7); Raymart Santiago on FPJ's Ang Probinsyano (A2Z 11/TV5); Gardo Versoza on First Yaya (GMA 7)	**Sylvia Sanchez on Huwag Kang Mangamba (A2Z 11/TV5)**; Janice de Belen on La Vida Lena (A2Z 11/TV5); Alexa Ilacad on Init sa Magdamag (A2Z 11/TV5); Agot Isidro on La Vida Lena (A2Z 11/TV5); Winwyn Marquez on Owe My Love (GMA 7); Pilar Pilapil on First Yaya (GMA 7); Maricel Soriano on Ang sa Iyo ay Akin (A2Z 11/TV5); Lorna Tolentino on FPJ's Ang Probinsyano (A2Z 11/TV5); Eula Valdes on Huwag Kang Mangamba (A2Z 11/TV5); Carmina Villarroel on Babawiin Ko Ang Lahat (GMA 7)
Best Single Performance by An Actor	Best Single Performance by An Actress
**Arjo Atayde on Maalaala Mo Kaya: Doctor Hero (A2Z 11)**; **Joshua Garcia on Maalaala Mo Kaya: Life's Sketch (A2Z 11)**; Nash Aguas on Maalaala Mo Kaya: Bible (A2Z 11); Nonie Buencamino on Maalaala Mo Kaya: Life's Sketch (A2Z 11); Royce Cabrera on Magpakailanman: Life of a Prostitute (GMA 7); Martin del Rosario on Magpakailanman: The Lockdown Wife (GMA 7); Mark Herras on Magpakailanman: I Married My Rapist Husband (GMA 7); Francis Magundayao on Maalaala Mo Kaya: Bible (A2Z 11)	**Jennylyn Mercado on Magpakailanman: Sa Kamay ng Fake Healer (GMA 7)**; Kyline Alcantara on Magpakailanman: Rape Victim, Ikinulong (GMA 7); Kim Chiu on Maalaala Mo Kaya: Pansit (A2Z 11); Jane de Leon on Maalaala Mo Kaya: Doctor Hero (A2Z 11); Gelli de Belen on Tadhana: Beast Friend (GMA 7); Jaclyn Jose on Tadhana: Bekiry (GMA 7); Bianca Umali on Magpakailanman: Sayaw Ng Buhay (GMA 7)
Best New Male TV Personality	Best New Female TV Personality
**Renshie de Guzman on Huwag Kang Mangamba (A2Z 11/TV5)**; **LA Santos on Ang sa Iyo ay Akin (A2Z 11/TV5)**; Elijah Canlas on Paano ang Pasko? (TV5); John Vic De Guzman on Owe My Love (GMA 7); Dave Duque on My Fantastic Pag-ibig: Invisiboi (GTV 27); Sandro Muhlach on All-Out Sundays (GMA 7); Benedict Ramos on My Fantastic Pag-ibig: Ghosted (GTV 27); Ricci Rivero on Gen Z (TV5); Shido Roxas on Wish Ko Lang: Mr. Right (GMA 7); Kaloy Tingcungco on My Fantastic Pag-ibig: The Lucky One (GTV 27)	**Catriona Gray on Sunday Noontime Live (TV5)**; Yesh Burce on The Lost Recipe (GTV 27); Hasna Cabral on La Vida Lena (A2Z 11/TV5); Claire Castro on The Lost Recipe (GTV 27); Ella Cristofani on My Fantastic Pag-ibig: Ghosted (GTV 27); Anna Mabasa-Muhlach on Ang Daigdig Ko'y Ikaw (Net 25); Margaux Montana on Huwag Kang Mangamba (A2Z 11/TV5); Pamela Prinster on All-Out Sundays (GMA 7); Emma Tiglao on Mata ng Agila (Net 25); Elle Villanueva on My Fantastic Pag-ibig: Invisiboi (GTV 27)
Best Comedy Actor	Best Comedy Actress
**Paolo Contis on Bubble Gang (GMA 7)**; Sef Cadayona on Bubble Gang (GMA 7); Robin Padilla on Kesayasaya (Net 25); Boy 2 Quizon on Bubble Gang (GMA 7); Vic Sotto on Daddy's Gurl (GMA 7); Betong Sumaya on Bubble Gang (GMA 7); Michael V. on Pepito Manaloto (GMA 7); Ian Veneracion on Oh My Dad! (TV5)	**Manilyn Reynes on Pepito Manaloto (GMA 7)**; Boobsie on Kesayasaya (Net 25); Pilita Corrales on Kesayasaya (Net 25); Valeen Montenegro on Bubble Gang (GMA 7); Vina Morales on Kesayasaya (Net 25); Sue Ramirez on Oh My Dad! (TV5); Chariz Solomon on Bubble Gang (GMA 7); Nova Villa on Pepito Manaloto (GMA 7)
Best Male TV Host	Best Female TV Host
**Paolo Ballesteros on Eat Bulaga (GMA 7)**; Billy Crawford on Lunch Out Loud (TV5); Robi Domingo on ASAP Natin 'To (A2Z 11/TV5); Jose Manalo on Eat Bulaga (GMA 7); Luis Manzano on ASAP Natin 'To (A2Z 11/TV5); Martin Nievera on ASAP Natin 'To (A2Z 11/TV5); Piolo Pascual on Sunday Noontime Live (TV5); Gary Valenciano on ASAP Natin 'To (A2Z 11/TV5); Vice Ganda on It's Showtime (A2Z 11)	**Kim Chiu on It's Showtime (A2Z 11)**; Alex Gonzaga on Lunch Out Loud (TV5); Amy Perez on It's Showtime (A2Z 11); Julie Anne San Jose on All-Out Sundays (GMA 7); Karylle on It's Showtime (A2Z 11); Kitkat on Happy Time (Net 25); Maine Mendoza on Eat Bulaga (GMA 7); Regine Velasquez on ASAP Natin 'To (A2Z 11/TV5)
Best Talent Search Program Host	Best Celebrity Talk Show Host
**Rayver Cruz and Julie Anne San Jose on The Clash (GMA 7)**; K Brosas, Donita Nose and Randy Santiago on Sing Galing (TV5); Vina Morales, Imelda Papin, Marcelito Pomoy and Marco Sison on Tagisan ng Galing (Net 25)	**Melai Cantiveros, Karla Estrada and Jolina Magdangal on Magandang Buhay (A2Z 11)**; Helen Gamboa on Helen's Kitchen (TV5); Cassy Legaspi, Mavy Legaspi and Carmina Villarroel on Sarap, 'Di Ba? (GMA 7); Camille Prats and Iya Villania on Mars Pa More (GMA 7); Gladys Reyes on Moments (Net 25)
Best Male Newscaster	Best Female Newscaster
**Joee Guilas on PTV News Tonight (PTV 4)**; Atom Araullo on State of the Nation (GTV 27); Aljo Bendijo on Sentro Balita (PTV 4); Arnold Clavio on Saksi (GMA 7); Vic Lima on Mata ng Agila (Net 25); Ivan Mayrina on 24 Oras Weekend (GMA 7); Raffy Tima on Balitanghali (GTV 27)	**Vicky Morales on 24 Oras (GMA 7)**; Pia Arcangel on Saksi and 24 Oras Weekend (GMA 7); Cheryl Cosim on Frontline Pilipinas (TV5); Pia Hontiveros on News Night (CNN Philippines 9); Connie Sison on Balitanghali (GTV 27); Jessica Soho on State Of The Nation (GTV 27); Pinky Webb on Balitaan (CNN Philippines 9)
Best Public Affairs Program Host	Best Morning Show Host
**Pinky Webb on The Source with Pinky Webb (CNN Philippines 9)**; Ruth Cabal on On the Record (CNN Philippines 9); Andrei Felix on Sports Desk (CNN Philippines 9); Rico Hizon on The Exchange with Rico Hizon (CNN Philippines 9); Pia Hontiveros on Politics As Usual (CNN Philippines 9); Rodante Marcoleta and Gen Subardiaga on Sa Ganang Mamamayan (Net 25); Caesar Vallejos on Open for Business (Net 25)	**Love Anover, Lyn Ching-Pascual, Arnold Clavio, Nathaniel Cruz, Susan Enriquez, Suzi Entrata-Abrera, Ivan Mayrina, Lhar Santiago, Connie Sison and Mariz Umali on Unang Hirit (GMA 7)**; Sarah Barba-Cabodil, Diego Castro III, Angela Lagunzad, Joseph Lee, Daniel Razon, Bong Santiago and Rheena Villamor on Good Morning Kuya (UNTV 37); Gab Bayan, Audrey Gorriceta and Diane Querrer on Rise and Shine Pilipinas (PTV 4); Earlo Bringas, Wej Cudiamat, Kristel Fesalbon, Genesis Gomez and Phoebe Publico on Pambansang Almusal (Net 25)
Best Public Service Program Host	Best Documentary Program Host
**Edinell Calvario on Healing Galing (UNTV 37)**; Martin Andanar and Rocky Ignacio on Laging Handa Public Hearing (PTV 4); Mike Enriquez on Imbestigador (GMA 7); Vicky Morales on Wish Ko Lang (GMA 7)	**Atom Araullo on The Atom Araullo Specials (GMA 7)**; Sandra Aguinaldo, Atom Araullo, Kara David, Howie Severino and Raffy Tima on i-Witness (GMA 7); Pia Arcangel on Tunay Na Buhay (GMA 7); Kara David on Brigada (GTV 27); Maki Pulido and Jun Veneracion on Reporter's Notebook (GMA 7); Pinky Webb on CNN Philippines Presents (CNN Philippines 9)
Best Magazine Show Host	Best Lifestyle Show Host
**Susan Enriquez and Mark Salazar on iJuander (GTV 27)**; Love Anover, Jay Arcilla, Maey Bautista, Bea Binene and Vicky Morales on Good News Kasama si Vicky Morales (GTV 27); Korina Sanchez on Rated Korina (TV5); Jessica Soho on Kapuso Mo, Jessica Soho (GMA 7)	**Dianne Medina on Loving What You Do (GTV 27)**; Gil Cuerva and Solenn Heussaff on Taste Buddies (GTV 27); Michelle Dee, Winwyn Marquez and Thia Thomalla on Glow Up (GTV 27)
Best Educational Program Host	Best Children Show Host
**Kara David on Pinas Sarap (GTV 27)**; Drew Arellano on AHA! (GMA 7); Nielsen Donato and Ferdie Recio on Born to Be Wild (GMA 7); Dreddie Gomez on MedTalk Health Talk (CNN Philippines 9); Robin Padilla on Unlad: Kaagapay Sa Buhay (Net 25); JR Royol on Farm to Table (GTV 27)	**Sedrick Ganolon, Madisen Go, Gracelle Joace Jimenez, Anastacia Paronda, Candice Ayesha Paronda on Talents Academy (IBC 13)**; Dj Albert on Anong Say Nyo? (Net 25); Sally Lopez on Be Brighter (Net 25); Sally Lopez on Kid Kwento (Net 25)

== Special awards ==
=== Ading Fernando Lifetime Achievement Award ===
- Connie Angeles

=== Excellence in Broadcasting Lifetime Achievement Award ===
- Raffy Tulfo

=== German Moreno Power Tandem Award ===
- Kelvin Miranda and Mikee Quintos
- Donny Pangilinan and Belle Mariano

=== Stars of the Night ===
- Paolo Ballesteros (Male)
- Pops Fernandez (Female)

=== Winning Looks of the Night ===
- John Estrada (Male)
- Aiko Melendez (Female)

=== Faces of the Night ===
- John Estrada (Male)
- Pops Fernandez (Female)

=== Celebrities of the Night ===
- JM de Guzman (Male)
- Aiko Melendez (Female)

=== Special Citation ===
- Jojo Flores
- Maricar Moina

== Most major nominations ==
Nominations by Network
Nominations	Network
100	TV5
85	GMA 7
54	A2Z 11
30	Net 25
28	GTV 27
18	CNN Philippines 9
9	PTV 4
5	UNTV 37
3	IBC 13

== Most major wins ==
Wins by Network
Wins	Network
23	GMA 7
12	A2Z 11
7	TV5
4	GTV 27
2	PTV 4
2	IBC 13
2	Net 25
1	CNN Philippines 9
1	UNTV 37

== Performers ==
- Lani Misalucha
- Kris Lawrence
- Joaquin Garcia
- JV Decena
- Kuh Ledesma

== See also ==
- PMPC Star Awards for TV
- 2021 in Philippine television
