= Biyahe ni Drew =

Philippine television documentary show

- Title card
- Also known as: Drew's Travel Adventure
- Genre: Travel documentary
- Presented by: Drew Arellano
- Country of origin: Philippines
- Original language: Tagalog

Production
- Executive producer: Deanna P. Bibat
- Camera setup: Multiple-camera setup
- Running time: 27–45 minutes
- Production company: GMA Public Affairs

Original release
- Network: GMA News TV (2013–21); GTV (since 2021); GMA Network (2024)
- Release: February 1, 2013 – present

Biyahe ni Drew (transl. Trip of Drew / international title: Drew's Travel Adventure) is a Philippine television travel documentary show broadcast by GMA News TV, GTV and GMA Network. Hosted by Drew Arellano, it premiered on GMA News TV on February 1, 2013.

The series is streaming online on YouTube.

== Premise ==
Drew Arellano shows viewers that with a limited budget, people could have a vacation in the Philippines and abroad for a couple of days.

== Overview ==
The production was halted in March 2020 due to the enhanced community quarantine in Luzon caused by the COVID-19 pandemic. The show resumed its programming on November 13, 2020. In February 2021, GMA News TV was rebranded as GTV, with the show being carried over. The show premiered on GMA Network on August 3, 2024, on the network's Sabado Star Power sa Hapon line up.

== Ratings ==
According to AGB Nielsen Philippines' Nationwide Urban Television Audience Measurement People in television homes, the first episode of Biyahe ni Drew on GMA Network, earned a 5.5% rating.

== Accolades ==
Accolades received by Biyahe ni Drew
Year	Award	Category	Recipient	Result	Ref.
2013	27th PMPC Star Awards for Television	Best Travel Show	Biyahe ni Drew	Won	
2013	27th PMPC Star Awards for Television	Best Travel Show Host	Drew Arellano	Nominated	
2014	ENPRESS Golden Screen TV Awards	Outstanding Lifestyle Program	"Biliran"	Nominated	
2014	ENPRESS Golden Screen TV Awards	Outstanding Lifestyle Program Host	Drew Arellano	Nominated	
2014	28th PMPC Star Awards for Television	Best Travel Show	Biyahe ni Drew	Won	
2014	28th PMPC Star Awards for Television	Best Travel Show Host	Drew Arellano	Nominated	
2015	29th PMPC Star Awards for Television	Best Travel Show	Biyahe ni Drew	Won	
2015	29th PMPC Star Awards for Television	Best Travel Show Host	Drew Arellano	Won	
2016	30th PMPC Star Awards for Television	Best Travel Show	Biyahe ni Drew	Won	
2016	30th PMPC Star Awards for Television	Best Travel Show Host	Drew Arellano	Won	
2017	1st Philippine Tourism Industry Awards	Travel Oriented TV Show	Biyahe ni Drew	Won	
2017	31st PMPC Star Awards for Television	Best Travel Show Host	Drew Arellano	Won	
2018	1st Dangal ng Bayan Awards	Media Excellence Award for Tourism	Biyahe ni Drew	Won	
2018	32nd PMPC Star Awards for Television	Best Travel Show	Biyahe ni Drew	Nominated	
2018	32nd PMPC Star Awards for Television	Best Travel Show Host	Drew Arellano	Nominated	
2019	41st Catholic Mass Media Awards	Best Adult Educational and Cultural Program	Biyahe ni Drew	Won	
2019	33rd PMPC Star Awards for Television	Best Travel Show	Biyahe ni Drew	Nominated	
2019	33rd PMPC Star Awards for Television	Best Travel Show Host	Drew Arellano	Nominated	
2020	Asian Academy Creative Awards	Best Lifestyle Entertainment Host/Presenter	Drew Arellano	Won	
2021	34th PMPC Star Awards for Television	Best Travel Show	Biyahe ni Drew	Nominated	
2021	34th PMPC Star Awards for Television	Best Travel Show Host	Drew Arellano	Nominated	
2024	6th Gawad Lasallianeta	Most Outstanding Travel/Lifestyle Show Host	Drew Arellano	Won	
2024	Asian Academy Creative Awards	Best Lifestyle Program	"Let's Go to Oriental Mindoro	Won	
2025	37th PMPC Star Awards for Television	Best Lifestyle/Travel Show	Biyahe ni Drew	Nominated	
2025	37th PMPC Star Awards for Television	Best Lifestyle/Travel Show Host	Drew Arellano	Nominated	
2025	38th PMPC Star Awards for Television	Best Lifestyle Travel Show	Biyahe ni Drew	Pending	
2025	38th PMPC Star Awards for Television	Best Lifestyle Travel Show Host	Drew Arellano	Pending	
