= Diego Silang Movement =

- Abbreviation: DSM
- Formation: 2008; 18 years ago
- Founders: Karlo Alamares; Rom Factolerin
- Purpose: Men's rights advocacy
- Region served: Philippines

The Diego Silang Movement (DSM) is a male advocacy group in the Philippines which supports the legalization of divorce in the Philippines as well as for further legal protection for male victims of abuse.

== Background ==
The Diego Silang Movement was established in 2008 by writers Karlo Alamares and Rom Factolerin. The group was named after Filipino revolutionary leader Diego Silang.

== Political positions ==
The Diego Silang Movement professes that its existence is a "living proof of the solidarity" between men, women and the LGBTQ community. It advocates for the legalization of divorce in the Philippines, a process of dissolution of marriage which is still unrecognized in the country. It insist the legalization of divorce is not affront to the "sanctity of marriage".

It also provides supports to men who were filed charges by their wives or girlfriends under the Anti-Violence Against Women and their Children Act (Anti-VAWC Act) of 2004 or Republic Act (RA) No. 9262. The group advocates for equal protection among genders on offenses mentioned in RA 9262. Factolerin says that RA 9262 defaults to giving the sole custody of children to the mother despite alleged abuse of the father remains unproven.

The group has supported House Bill No. 4888 proposed by Fidel Nograles in the 18th Congress which expands protection of Anti-VAWC Act to same-sex partners and husbands in heterosexual relationships. He argued the male victims of domestic abuse have no legal recourse aside from finaling criminal cases under the Revised Penal Code.

It said that men of are victims of abuse has approached them but are not publicly ready to speak of their experience due to social stigma.

== In popular media ==
The group was featured in an October 2018 episode of the documentary series Reel Time, entitled "Hinagpis ni Adan" (lit. 'anguish of Adam'). The episode which tackles domestic violence against men was aired for Domestic Violence Month.
