= Gil Cuerva =

Filipino actor and international model

- Born: Guillermo Ernesto Eleazar Cuerva; August 21, 1995 (age 31); Manila, Philippines
- Other names: Gil; Matteo
- Occupations: Actor, model
- Years active: 2016–present
- Agent: GMA Artist Center (2016–present)
- Known for: Matteo in My Love from the Star
- Relatives: Bing Loyzaga (aunt)

Guillermo Ernesto Eleazar Cuerva (born August 21, 1995), professionally known as Gil Cuerva, is a Filipino actor and international model. Cuerva made his debut on the tele-drama remake of the hit South Korean romantic-comedy-scifi series, My Love from the Star, as one of the leading characters with GMA Network's Ultimate Star Jennylyn Mercado that briefly aired on GMA Network.

== Career ==
Cuerva is a Filipino model of Spanish descent on his father's side. He started modeling for a Vaseline Dandruff Care Commercial, which the late German Moreno was in cameo. After modelling in Hong Kong for a couple of months, he came back home to the Philippines and auditioned for the Philippine adaptation of the Korean science-fiction My Love from the Star which starred Jennylyn Mercado, Christian Bautista and Jackie Rice.

== Filmography ==
=== Television ===
==== Drama and comedy ====
Year	Title	Role
2016	Eat Bulaga!	Cameo, Kalyeserye segment
2017	My Love from the Star	Matteo Domingo
2017	Dear Uge: K-drama Rama	Dong Hyeon
2017	Daig Kayo ng Lola Ko: Ang Prinsipe at ang Feeling Api	Prinsipe Edward / Tommy
2018	Super Ma'am	Xavier
2018	Daig Kayo ng Lola Ko: Tarzan	Tarzan
2018	My Guitar Princess	Elton Smith
2019	Sahaya	young Harold
2019	Daig Kayo ng Lola Ko: Super Kiriray and the Wonder Kulits	Paolo
2019—20	Beautiful Justice	Vincent "Vin" Ocampo
2020	Daig Kayo ng Lola Ko: Mermaid for Each Other	Liam
2021	I Can See You: On My Way to You	Albert Manansala
2021	Dear Uge: GangstaSistah	Christian
2021	Daig Kayo ng Lola Ko: Oh My Oppa!	Gong Hyun Bin
2022	Daig Kayo ng Lola Ko: My Ex's Wedding	Jessie
2022	Love You Stranger	Tristan Dela Paz
2023	Underage	Lancer "Lance" A. Guerrero
2023	Tadhana: Nympha	Luis
2023	Tadhana: Secrets	Rave
2024	Lilet Matias: Attorney-at-Law	Father Anjo
2025	Slay	Luke

=== Reality, variety and talk shows ===
Year	Title	Notes
2016	24 Oras	Himself / Guest
2016	Magic of Christmas: The 2016 GMA Christmas Special	Himself / Performer
2017	Everyday Sarap	Himself / Guest
2017	Unang Hirit	Himself / Guest
2017	Full House Tonight	Himself / Guest / Various roles
2017	MARS	Himself / Guest
2017	Taste Buddies	Himself / Guest
2017	Sunday PinaSaya	Himself / Guest, performer
2017	Tonight with Arnold Clavio	Himself / Guest
2017	Wowowin	Himself / Guest, player, performer
2018	All Star Videoke	Himself / Player
2020	Makulay ang Buhay	Himself / Various Roles

=== Film ===
Year	Title	Role
2023	Five Breakups and a Romance	Matt
2025	Only We Know	Leo Silva

== Accolades ==
Year	Association	Category	Nominated work	Result
2017	31st PMPC Star Awards for Television	Best New Male TV Personality	My Love from the Star	Nominated
