= Aha! (TV program) =

Philippine television infotainment show

- Title card from 2024 to 2025
- Genre: Infotainment
- Written by: Rachel Arias
- Directed by: Jeffrey Mejia
- Presented by: Drew Arellano
- Country of origin: Philippines
- Original language: Tagalog

Production
- Executive producer: Mildred G. Ablanque
- Camera setup: Multiple-camera setup
- Running time: 24–26 minutes
- Production company: GMA Public Affairs

Original release
- Network: GMA Network
- Release: April 4, 2010 – 2025

Aha! is a Philippine television infotainment show broadcast by GMA Network. Hosted by Drew Arellano, it premiered on April 4, 2010 on the network's Sunday morning line up. The show concluded in 2025.

The show is streaming online on YouTube.

== Hosts ==
- Drew Arellano

Segment hosts

- Betong Sumaya
- Isko Salvador
- Boobay
- Rhian Ramos

== Production ==
Principal photography was halted in March 2020 due to the enhanced community quarantine in Luzon caused by the COVID-19 pandemic. The show resumed its programming on October 11, 2020.

== Ratings ==
According to AGB Nielsen Philippines' Mega Manila household television ratings, the pilot episode of Aha! earned a 10.1% rating.

== Accolades ==
Accolades received by Aha!
Year	Awards	Category	Recipient	Result	Ref.
2011	8th Golden Screen TV Awards	Outstanding Educational Program	Aha!	Nominated	
2011	8th Golden Screen TV Awards	Outstanding Educational Program Host	Drew Arellano	Won	
2011	25th PMPC Star Awards for Television	Best Educational Program	Aha!	Nominated	
2011	25th PMPC Star Awards for Television	Best Educational Program Host	Drew Arellano	Nominated	
2011	Anak TV Seal Awards		Aha!	Won	
2012	Anak TV Seal Awards		Aha!	Won	
2013	10th Golden Screen TV Awards	Outstanding Educational Program	Aha!	Won	
2013	10th Golden Screen TV Awards	Outstanding Educational Program Host	Drew Arellano	Won	
2013	27th PMPC Star Awards for Television	Best Educational Program Host	Drew Arellano, Boobay, Patani Daño, Maey Bautista, Betong Sumaya	Nominated	
2014	Golden Screen TV Awards	Outstanding Educational Program	"I Heart You"	Nominated	
2014	Golden Screen TV Awards	Outstanding Educational Program Host	Drew Arellano	Nominated	
2014	28th PMPC Star Awards for Television	Best Educational Program	Aha!	Nominated	
2014	28th PMPC Star Awards for Television	Best Educational Program Host	Drew Arellano, Boobay	Nominated	
2014	Anak TV Seal Awards		Aha!	Won	
2015	Golden Screen TV Awards	Outstanding Educational Program	Aha!	Won	
2015	Golden Screen TV Awards	Outstanding Educational Program Host	Drew Arellano	Won	
2015	Kagitingan Awards for Television	Pinakamagiting na Programang Pantelebisyon	Aha!	Won	
2015	29th PMPC Star Awards for Television	Best Lifestyle Show	Aha!	Nominated	
2015	29th PMPC Star Awards for Television	Best Lifestyle Show Host	Drew Arellano	Nominated	
2016	Anak TV Seal Awards		Aha!	Won	
2016	30th PMPC Star Awards for Television	Best Educational Program	Aha!	Nominated	
2016	30th PMPC Star Awards for Television	Best Educational Program Host	Drew Arellano	Nominated	
2016	Anak TV Seal Awards		Aha!	Won	
2017	31st PMPC Star Awards for Television	Best Educational Program	Aha!	Nominated	
2017	31st PMPC Star Awards for Television	Best Educational Program Host	Drew Arellano	Nominated	
2017	Anak TV Seal Awards		Aha!	Won	
2018	12th Gandingan Awards	Most Development-Oriented Educational Program	Aha!	Won	
2018	40th Catholic Mass Media Awards	Best Children and Youth Program	Aha!	Won	
2018	Platinum Stallion Media Awards	Best Educational Program	Aha!	Won	
2018	32nd PMPC Star Awards for Television	Best Educational Program	Aha!	Nominated	
2018	32nd PMPC Star Awards for Television	Best Educational Program Host	Drew Arellano	Nominated	
2019	33rd PMPC Star Awards for Television	Best Educational Program	Aha!	Nominated	
2019	33rd PMPC Star Awards for Television	Best Educational Program Host	Drew Arellano	Nominated	
2019	Anak TV Seal Awards		Aha!	Won	
2021	34th PMPC Star Awards for Television	Best Educational Program	Aha!	Nominated	
2021	34th PMPC Star Awards for Television	Best Educational Program Host	Drew Arellano	Nominated	
2023	35th PMPC Star Awards for Television	Best Educational Program	Aha!	Nominated	
2023	35th PMPC Star Awards for Television	Best Educational Program Host	Drew Arellano	Nominated	
2023	Anak TV Seal Awards		Aha!	Won	
2025	38th PMPC Star Awards for Television	Best Educational Program	Aha!	Nominated	
2025	38th PMPC Star Awards for Television	Best Educational Program Host	Drew Arellano	Nominated	
