= Taste Buddies =

Philippine television infotainment show

- Title card in 2021 to 2022
- Genre: Lifestyle; Infotainment
- Presented by: Solenn Heussaff; Isabelle Daza; Iya Villania; Rhian Ramos; Gil Cuerva
- Country of origin: Philippines
- Original language: Tagalog

Production
- Camera setup: Multiple-camera setup
- Running time: 30 minutes
- Production company: GMA Entertainment Group

Original release
- Network: GMA News TV (2012–21); GTV (2021–22)
- Release: October 27, 2012 – June 26, 2022

Taste Buddies is a Philippine television lifestyle infotainment show broadcast by GMA News TV and GTV. Originally hosted by Solenn Heussaff and Isabelle Daza, it premiered on GMA News TV on October 27, 2012. In February 2021, GMA News TV was rebranded as GTV, with the show being carried over. The show concluded on June 26, 2022. Heusaff and Gil Cuerva served as the final hosts.

== Premise ==
The show features discovery journeys in new things about food, events, places and adventures.

== Hosts ==
- Solenn Heussaff (2012–22)
- Isabelle Daza (2012–14)
- Iya Villania (2014–16)
- Rhian Ramos (2016–18)
- Gil Cuerva (2018–22)

Segment host

- Arra San Agustin (2018–21)

== Production ==
The production was halted in March 2020 due to the enhanced community quarantine in Luzon caused by the COVID-19 pandemic. The show resumed its programming on November 7, 2020.

== Accolades ==
Accolades received by Taste Buddies
Year	Award	Category	Recipient	Result	Ref.
2014	28th PMPC Star Awards for Television	Best Lifestyle Show	Taste Buddies	Nominated	
2014	28th PMPC Star Awards for Television	Best Lifestyle Show Host	Isabelle Daza Solenn Heussaff	Nominated	
2015	29th PMPC Star Awards for Television	Best Educational Show	Taste Buddies	Nominated	
2016	30th PMPC Star Awards for Television	Best Lifestyle Show	Taste Buddies	Nominated	
2017	31st PMPC Star Awards for Television	Best Lifestyle Show Host	Solenn Heussaff Rhian Ramos	Won	
2017	COMGUILD Media	Best Lifestyle Program	Taste Buddies	Won	
2018	32nd PMPC Star Awards for Television	Best Lifestyle Show	Taste Buddies	Nominated	
2018	32nd PMPC Star Awards for Television	Best Lifestyle Show Host	Solenn Heussaff Rhian Ramos	Nominated	
2019	33rd PMPC Star Awards for Television	Best Lifestyle Show	Taste Buddies	Nominated	
2019	33rd PMPC Star Awards for Television	Best Lifestyle Show Host	Solenn Heussaff Gil Cuerva	Nominated	
2021	34th PMPC Star Awards for Television	Best Lifestyle Show	Taste Buddies	Won	
2021	34th PMPC Star Awards for Television	Best Lifestyle Show Host	Solenn Heussaff Gil Cuerva	Won	
2023	35th PMPC Star Awards for Television	Best Lifestyle Show	Taste Buddies	Won	
2023	35th PMPC Star Awards for Television	Best Lifestyle Show Host	Solenn Heussaff Gil Cuerva	Nominated	
