= Good News with Vicky Morales =

Philippine television news magazine show

- Title card since 2025
- Also known as: Good News Kasama si Vicky Morales (Note: 2011–24); Good News
- Genre: News magazine
- Written by: Agay Llanera
- Directed by: Armin Collado
- Presented by: Vicky Morales; Bea Binene; Love Añover; Maey Bautista; Jay Arcilla
- Country of origin: Philippines
- Original language: Tagalog

Production
- Executive producer: Jacel Arqueros Chiu
- Camera setup: Multiple-camera setup
- Running time: 30 minutes
- Production company: GMA Public Affairs

Original release
- Network: GMA News TV (2011–21); GTV (since 2021)
- Release: March 6, 2011 – present

Good News with Vicky Morales is a Philippine television news magazine show broadcast by GMA News TV and GTV. Hosted by Vicky Morales, it premiered on March 6, 2011.

== Overview ==
Anchored by Vicky Morales, it features news that focuses on positive events in the Philippines. Bea Binene anchors segments that show different attractions for children as well as news from the youth.

In February 2021, GMA News TV was rebranded as GTV, with the show being carried over.

== Hosts ==
- Vicky Morales
- Bea Binene
- Love Añover
- Maey Bautista
- Jay Arcilla

== Production ==
The production was halted in March 2020 due to the enhanced community quarantine in Luzon caused by the COVID-19 pandemic. The show resumed its programming on November 9, 2020.

== Accolades ==
Accolades received by Good News
Year	Award	Category	Recipient	Result	Ref.
2012	26th PMPC Star Awards for Television	Best Magazine Show	Good News Kasama si Vicky Morales	Nominated	
2012	26th PMPC Star Awards for Television	Best Magazine Show Host	Vicky Morales	Nominated	
2013	27th PMPC Star Awards for Television	Best Magazine Show	Good News Kasama si Vicky Morales	Nominated	
2013	27th PMPC Star Awards for Television	Best Magazine Show Host	Bea Binene Vicky Morales	Nominated	
2014	28th PMPC Star Awards for Television	Best Magazine Show	Good News Kasama si Vicky Morales	Nominated	
2014	28th PMPC Star Awards for Television	Best Magazine Show Host	Bea Binene Love Añover Vicky Morales	Nominated	
2015	29th PMPC Star Awards for Television	Best Magazine Show	Good News Kasama si Vicky Morales	Nominated	
2015	29th PMPC Star Awards for Television	Best Magazine Show Host	Bea Binene Love Añover Vicky Morales	Nominated	
2016	30th PMPC Star Awards for Television	Best Magazine Show	Good News Kasama si Vicky Morales	Nominated	
2016	30th PMPC Star Awards for Television	Best Magazine Show Host	Bea Binene Love Añover Vicky Morales	Nominated	
2017	31st PMPC Star Awards for Television	Best Magazine Show	Good News Kasama si Vicky Morales	Nominated	
2017	31st PMPC Star Awards for Television	Best Magazine Show Host	Bea Binene Love Añover Vicky Morales	Nominated	
2018	32nd PMPC Star Awards for Television	Best Magazine Show	Good News Kasama si Vicky Morales	Nominated	
2018	32nd PMPC Star Awards for Television	Best Magazine Show Host	Bea Binene Vicky Morales	Nominated	
2019	33rd PMPC Star Awards for Television	Best Magazine Show	Good News Kasama si Vicky Morales	Nominated	
2019	33rd PMPC Star Awards for Television	Best Magazine Show Host	Vicky Morales	Nominated	
2021	34th PMPC Star Awards for Television	Best Magazine Show	Good News Kasama si Vicky Morales	Nominated	
2021	34th PMPC Star Awards for Television	Best Magazine Show Host	Bea Binene Jay Arcilla Love Añover Maey Bautista Vicky Morales	Nominated	
2023	35th PMPC Star Awards for Television	Best Magazine Show	Good News Kasama si Vicky Morales	Nominated	
2023	35th PMPC Star Awards for Television	Best Magazine Show Host	Bea Binene Jay Arcilla Love Añover Maey Bautista Vicky Morales	Nominated	
2025	36th PMPC Star Awards for Television	Best Magazine Show	Good News Kasama si Vicky Morales	Pending	
2025	36th PMPC Star Awards for Television	Best Magazine Show Host	Vicky Morales	Pending	
