= Reel Time =

Philippine television documentary show

- Title card
- Genre: Documentary
- Country of origin: Philippines
- Original language: Tagalog

Production
- Camera setup: Multiple-camera setup
- Running time: 40–60 minutes
- Production company: GMA News and Public Affairs

Original release
- Network: GMA News TV
- Release: March 6, 2011 – March 13, 2020

Reel Time is a Philippine television documentary show broadcast by GMA News TV. It premiered on March 6, 2011. The show concluded on March 13, 2020.

The show is streaming online on YouTube.

== Production ==
The production was halted in March 2020 due to the enhanced community quarantine in Luzon caused by the COVID-19 pandemic.

== Accolades ==
Accolades received by Reel Time
Year	Award	Category	Recipient	Result	Ref.
2011	Golden Screen TV Awards	Outstanding Documentary Program	"Dapithapon"	Nominated	
2012	Asia–Pacific Child Rights Award for Television		"Lusong"	Finalist	
2012	Asia–Pacific Child Rights Award for Television		"Alitaptap sa Dagat"	Finalist	
2012	26th PMPC Star Awards for Television	Best Documentary Program	Reel Time	Nominated	
2013	Asia–Pacific Child Rights Award for Television		"Salat"	Grand Prize	
2013	Asia–Pacific Child Rights Award for Television		"Batang Halau"	Finalist	
2013	The New York Festivals (International Television & Film Awards)		"Salat"	Silver World Medal	
2013	Peabody Awards		"Salat"	Won	
2014	Asia–Pacific Child Rights Award for Television		"Gulong" "Dungkoy"	Finalist	
2014	Golden Screen TV Awards	Outstanding Documentary Program	"Salat"	Won	
2014	28th PMPC Star Awards for Television	Best Documentary Program	Reel Time	Nominated	
2015	Asia–Pacific Child Rights Award for Television		"Buho"	Grand Prize	
2016	Asia–Pacific Child Rights Award for Television		"Isinulat sa Tubig"	Grand Prize	
2016	Asia Rainbow TV Awards	Best Documentary	"Isinulat sa Tubig"	Nominated	
2016	The New York Festivals (International Television & Film Awards)	Human Concerns	"Isang Paa sa Hukay (The Price of Gold)"	Bronze World Medal	
2016	Shanghai TV Festival		"Isang Paa sa Hukay (The Price of Gold)"	Finalist	
2016	URTI Grand Prix	Author's Documentary	"Isang Paa sa Hukay (The Price of Gold)"	Finalist	
2016	US International Film & Video Festival	Gold Medal–Documentary: Public Affairs Program	"Isang Paa sa Hukay (The Price of Gold)"	Won	
2016	US International Film & Video Festival	Best of Festival	"Isang Paa sa Hukay (The Price of Gold)"	Nominated	
2016	World Television Awards	Best Documentary Program in Promoting Children's Rights–Humanity	"Isang Paa sa Hukay (The Price of Gold)"	Won	
2017	31st PMPC Star Awards for Television	Best Documentary Program	Reel Time	Nominated	
2017	The New York Festivals (International Television & Film Awards)	Gold World Medal	"Maling Akala"	Won	
2018	32nd PMPC Star Awards for Television	Best Documentary Program	Reel Time	Nominated	
2019	33rd PMPC Star Awards for Television	Best Documentary Program	Reel Time	Nominated	
