= 31st PMPC Star Awards for Television =

Philippine awards given annually for excellence in television achievements

- Date: November 12, 2017; November 19, 2017 (Delayed Telecast)
- Location: Henry Lee Irwin Theater, Ateneo de Manila University, Quezon City
- Hosted by: Ruffa Gutierrez; Richard Gutierrez; Robi Domingo; Jodi Sta. Maria

Television/radio coverage
- Network: ABS-CBN
- Produced by: Airtime Marketing Philippines, Inc.
- Directed by: Bert de Leon

The 31st PMPC Star Awards for Television ceremony was held at the Henry Lee Irwin Theater in Ateneo de Manila University, Quezon City on November 12, 2017, and was broadcast over ABS-CBN on November 19, 2017 (on Sunday's Best). The ceremony is hosted by Ruffa Gutierrez, Richard Gutierrez, Robi Domingo and Jodi Sta. Maria with Ronnie Liang, Jason Dy, Kris Lawrence, Radha Cuadrado and Jessa Zaragoza performs the theme songs of the Best Drama Series nominees in an opening number; Elmo Magalona, Janella Salvador and BoybandPH performs the Boy band songs in a sing and dance number; and Vina Morales and The CompanY performs in a tribute number for the Ading Fernando Lifetime Achievement Award to Vic Sotto. The awards night is directed by Bert de Leon.

== Nominees and winners ==
Here is the full set of nominees (in alphabetical order) and winners of the 31st PMPC Star Awards for Television.

Winners are listed first and highlighted with boldface.

=== Stations ===
Best TV Station

Winner: **ABS-CBN** (Channel 2 (A) / 43 (D))

- AksyonTV (Channel 41 (A) / 51 (D))
- BEAM 31 (Channel 31 (A) / 32 (D)
- CNN Philippines (Channel 9 (A) / 19 (D))
- GMA 7 (Channel 7 (A) / 27 (D))
- GMA News TV (Channel 11 (A) / 27 (D))
- IBC 13 (Channel 13 (A) / 26 (D))
- Light Network (Channel 33 (D))
- Net 25 (Channel 25 (A) / 49 (D))
- PTV 4 (Channel 4 (A) / 42 (D))
- RJTV 29 (Channel 29 (A) / 29 (D))
- SBN 21 (Channel 21 (A) / 22/30 (D))
- TV5 (Channel 5 (A) / 51 (D))
- UNTV News and Rescue (Channel 37 (A) / 38 (D))

=== Programs ===
Best Primetime Drama Series	Best Daytime Drama Series
Winner: **Alyas Robin Hood** (GMA 7) and **La Luna Sangre** (ABS-CBN 2) (tied): A Love to Last (ABS-CBN 2); Meant to Be (GMA 7); Mulawin vs. Ravena (GMA 7); My Dear Heart (ABS-CBN 2); Wildflower (ABS-CBN 2)	Winner: **The Greatest Love** (ABS-CBN 2): Ika-6 na Utos (GMA 7); Ikaw Lang ang Iibigin (ABS-CBN 2); Impostora (GMA 7); Legally Blind (GMA 7); Pusong Ligaw (ABS-CBN 2); The Better Half (ABS-CBN 2)
Best Drama Anthology	Best Horror/Fantasy Program
Winner: **Ipaglaban Mo** (ABS-CBN 2): Dear Uge (GMA 7); Karelasyon (GMA 7); Magpakailanman (GMA 7); Maynila (GMA 7); Tadhana (GMA 7); Wagas (GMA News TV)	Winner: **Wansapanataym** (ABS-CBN 2): Daig Kayo ng Lola Ko (GMA 7); Tsuperhero (GMA 7)
Best Public Service Program	Best Gag Show
Winner: **Wish Ko Lang** (GMA 7): Buhay OFW (AksyonTV 41); Failon Ngayon (ABS-CBN 2); Imbestigador (GMA 7); Mission Possible (ABS-CBN 2); My Puhunan (ABS-CBN 2); Salamat Dok (ABS-CBN 2); S.O.C.O. (Scene of the Crime Operatives) (ABS-CBN 2)	Winner: **Goin' Bulilit** (ABS-CBN 2): Banana Sundae (ABS-CBN 2); Hapi Ang Buhay (Net 25)
Best Comedy Program	Best Musical Variety Show
Winner: **Pepito Manaloto** (GMA 7): Hashtag Michael Angelo: The Sitcom (GMA News TV 11); Hay, Bahay! (GMA 7); Home Sweetie Home (ABS-CBN 2)	Winner: **ASAP** (ABS-CBN 2): Beautiful Sunday (Net 25); Letters and Music (Net 25); Sessions On 25th Street (Net 25)
Best Variety Show	Best Game Show
Winner: **Sunday PinaSaya** (GMA 7): Full House Tonight (GMA 7); It's Showtime (ABS-CBN 2)	Winner: **Wowowin** (GMA 7): Celebrity Bluff (GMA 7); People vs. the Stars (GMA 7); Superstar Duets (GMA 7)
Best Talent Search Program	Best Educational Program
Winner: **ASOP Music Festival** (UNTV 37): #LIKE (GMA 7)	Winner: **Matanglawin** (ABS-CBN 2): AHA! (GMA 7); Born to Be Wild (GMA 7); C the Difference (GMA News TV 11); Convergence (Net 25); Everyday Sarap with CDO (GMA News TV 11); iBilib (GMA 7); Idol Sa Kusina (GMA News TV 11)
Best Celebrity Talk Show	Best Documentary Program
Winner: **Gandang Gabi Vice** (ABS-CBN 2): Magandang Buhay (ABS-CBN 2); MARS (GMA News TV 11); MOMents (Net 25); Profiles (CNN Philippines 9); Real Talk (CNN Philippines 9); Tonight with Arnold Clavio (GMA News TV 11); Tonight with Boy Abunda (ABS-CBN 2)	Winner: **I-Witness** (GMA 7): Front Row (GMA 7); History with Lourd (TV5); Investigative Documentaries (GMA News TV 11); Motorcycle Diaries (GMA News TV 11); Munting Pangarap (UNTV 37); Reel Time (GMA News TV 11); Reporter's Notebook (GMA 7)
Best Documentary Special	Best Magazine Show
Winner: **Di Ka Pasisiil** (ABS-CBN 2) (Airing Date: August 13, 2017): Alaala: A Martial Law Special (GMA 7) (Airing Date: September 17, 2017); Mukha: Night Shift (ABS-CBN 2) (Airing Date: June 11, 2017); Sa Serbisyong Totoo: Nagbago Ang Buhay Ko (GMA 7) (Airing Date: June 25, 2017)	Winner: **Kapuso Mo, Jessica Soho** (GMA 7): Ang Pinaka (GMA News TV 11); Brigada (GMA News TV 11); Good News (GMA News TV 11); I-Juander (GMA News TV 11); Mga Kwento ni Marc Logan (ABS-CBN 2); Rated K (ABS-CBN 2)
Best News Program	Best Morning Show
Winner: **TV Patrol** (ABS-CBN 2): 24 Oras (GMA 7); Aksyon Prime (TV5); Balitaan (CNN Philippines 9); Bandila (ABS-CBN 2); News to Go (GMA News TV 11); Saksi (GMA 7); State of the Nation (GMA News TV 11)	Winner: **Unang Hirit** (GMA 7): Bagong Pilipinas (PTV 4); Good Morning Kuya (UNTV 37); Pambansang Almusal (Net 25); Umagang Kay Ganda (ABS-CBN 2)
Best Public Affairs Program	Best Travel Show
Winner: **The Bottomline with Boy Abunda** (ABS-CBN 2) and **Sa Ganang Mamamayan** (Net 25) (tied): Bawal ang Pasaway kay Mareng Winnie (GMA News TV 11); Get It Straight with Daniel Razon (UNTV 37); Reaksyon (TV5); The Source (CNN Philippines 9); Tapatan ni Tunying (ABS-CBN 2)	Winner: **Landmarks** (Net 25): Biyaheng Negosyo (PTV 4); Bridging Boarders (PTV 4); Lakbai (TV5); Landmarks (Net 25); Road Trip (GMA 7)
Best Lifestyle Show
Winner: **The World of Gandang Ricky Reyes** (GMA News TV 11): The Boardroom (CNN Philippines 9); Leading Women (CNN Philippines 9); Sports U (ABS-CBN 2); Taste Buddies (GMA News TV 11)

=== Personalities ===
Best Drama Actor	Best Drama Actress
Winner: **Dingdong Dantes** (Alyas Robin Hood / GMA 7) and **Ruru Madrid** (Encantadia / GMA 7) (tied): Gerald Anderson (Ikaw Lang Ang Iibigin / ABS-CBN 2); Carlo Aquino (The Better Half / ABS-CBN 2); Gabby Concepcion (Ika-6 na Utos / GMA 7); Coco Martin (FPJ's Ang Probinsyano / ABS-CBN 2); Daniel Padilla (La Luna Sangre / ABS-CBN 2); James Reid (Till I Met You / ABS-CBN 2); Jericho Rosales (Magpahanggang Wakas / ABS-CBN 2); Ian Veneracion (A Love to Last / ABS-CBN 2)	Winner: **Sylvia Sanchez** (The Greatest Love / ABS-CBN 2): Bea Alonzo (A Love to Last / ABS-CBN 2); Kris Bernal (Impostora / GMA 7); Kathryn Bernardo (La Luna Sangre / ABS-CBN 2); Kim Chiu (Ikaw Lang Ang Iibigin / ABS-CBN 2); Sunshine Dizon (Ika-6 na Utos / GMA 7); Janine Gutierrez (Legally Blind / GMA 7); Sanya Lopez (Encantadia / GMA 7); Coney Reyes (My Dear Heart / ABS-CBN 2); Maja Salvador (Wildflower / ABS-CBN 2)
Best Drama Supporting Actor	Best Drama Supporting Actress
Winner: **Daniel Fernando** (Ikaw Lang Ang Iibigin / ABS-CBN 2): Marc Abaya (Legally Blind / GMA 7); Tirso Cruz III (Wildflower / ABS-CBN 2); Matt Evans (The Greatest Love / ABS-CBN 2); Joshua Garcia (The Greatest Love / ABS-CBN 2); Richard Gutierrez (La Luna Sangre / ABS-CBN 2); Jhong Hilario (FPJ's Ang Probinsyano / ABS-CBN 2); Joseph Marco (Wildflower / ABS-CBN 2); Arnold Reyes (Wildflower / ABS-CBN 2); Arron Villaflor (The Greatest Love / ABS-CBN 2)	Winner: **Aiko Melendez** (Wildflower / ABS-CBN 2): Iza Calzado (A Love to Last / ABS-CBN 2); Sunshine Cruz (Wildflower / ABS-CBN 2); Yassi Pressman (FPJ's Ang Probinsyano / ABS-CBN 2); Ina Raymundo (La Luna Sangre / ABS-CBN 2); Susan Roces (FPJ's Ang Probinsyano / ABS-CBN 2); Dimples Romana (The Greatest Love / ABS-CBN 2); Chanda Romero (Legally Blind / GMA 7); Eula Valdez (Hahamakin Ang Lahat / GMA 7); Carmina Villarroel (Till I Met You / ABS-CBN 2)
Best Single Performance by an Actor	Best Single Performance by an Actress
Winner: **John Estrada** (Maalaala Mo Kaya: Mansanas at Juice / ABS-CBN 2) and **Alden Richards** (Eat Bulaga Lenten Special: Kapatid / GMA 7) (tied): JC de Vera (Maalaala Mo Kaya: Baso / ABS-CBN 2); Enchong Dee (Maalaala Mo Kaya: Rehab Center / ABS-CBN 2); Yves Flores (Maalaala Mo Kaya: Mansanas at Juice / ABS-CBN 2); Xian Lim (Maalaala Mo Kaya: Kwek Kwek / ABS-CBN 2); Zanjoe Marudo (Maalaala Mo Kaya: Anino / ABS-CBN 2); Rocco Nacino (Magpakailanman: Losing Jeffrey, Finding Jason / GMA 7); Piolo Pascual (Maalaala Mo Kaya: Upuan / ABS-CBN 2); Dennis Trillo (Karelasyon: Ang Pagiging Preso ni Salby / GMA 7)	Winner: **Maricel Soriano** (Maalaala Mo Kaya: Baso / ABS-CBN 2): Isabelle Daza (Maalaala Mo Kaya: Upuan / ABS-CBN 2); Janice de Belen (Magpakailanman: Ang Swerteng Hatid ng Pera sa Basura / GMA 7); Angel Locsin (Maalaala Mo Kaya: Kotse-Kotsehan / ABS-CBN 2); Jane Oineza (Maalaala Mo Kaya: Kotse-Kotsehan / ABS-CBN 2); Angelica Panganiban (Ipaglaban Mo: Bugbog / ABS-CBN 2); Rochelle Pangilinan (Karelasyon: My Brother's Dark Secret / GMA 7); Sylvia Sanchez (Ipaglaban Mo: Testigo / ABS-CBN 2); Jodi Sta. Maria (Maalaala Mo Kaya: Baby For Sale / ABS-CBN 2)
Best New Male TV Personality	Best New Female TV Personality
Winner: **Tony Labrusca** (La Luna Sangre / ABS-CBN 2): Migo Adecer (Encantadia / GMA 7); Dave Bornea (Alyas Robin Hood / GMA 7); Gil Cuerva (My Love From the Star / GMA 7); Baste Duterte (Lakbai / TV5); Bruno Gabriel (Hahamakin Ang Lahat / GMA 7); Marco Gallo (Wansapanataym Presents: Amazing Ving / ABS-CBN 2); Addy Raj (Meant to Be / GMA 7)	Winner: **Mikee Quintos** (Encantadia / GMA 7): AC Bonifacio (Wansapanataym Presents: Amazing Ving / ABS-CBN 2); Kisses Delavin (Wansapanataym Presents: Amazing Ving / ABS-CBN 2); Maymay Entrata (Maalaala Mo Kaya: Bahay / ABS-CBN 2); Klea Pineda (Encantadia / GMA 7); Nayomi Ramos (My Dear Heart / ABS-CBN 2); Maika Rivera (Magpahanggang Wagas / ABS-CBN 2); Cora Waddell (Pusong Ligaw / ABS-CBN 2)
Best Child Performer	Best Public Service Program Host
Winner: **Nayomi Ramos** (My Dear Heart / ABS-CBN 2): Marc Justine Alvarez (Pinulot Ka Lang Sa Lupa / GMA 7); Awra Briguela (Wansapanataym Presents: Amazing Ving / ABS-CBN 2); Yesha Camile (Langit Lupa / ABS-CBN 2); Yuan Francisco (Encantadia / GMA 7); Enzo Pelojero (My Dear Heart / ABS-CBN 2); Justin James Quilantang (La Luna Sangre / ABS-CBN 2); Angelica Ulip (Ika-6 na Utos / GMA 7); Xia Vigor (Langit Lupa / ABS-CBN 2)	Winner: **Vicky Morales** (Wish Ko Lang! / GMA 7): Gus Abelgas (S.O.C.O. (Scene of the Crime Operatives) / ABS-CBN 2); Julius Babao (Mission Possible / ABS-CBN 2); Karen Davila (My Puhunan / ABS-CBN 2); Marissa del Mar (Buhay OFW / AksyonTV 41); Alvin Elchico and Bernadette Sembrano (Salamat Dok / ABS-CBN 2); Mike Enriquez (Imbestigador / GMA 7); Ted Failon (Failon Ngayon / ABS-CBN 2)
Best Comedy Actor	Best Comedy Actress
Winner: **Jobert Austria** (Banana Sundae / ABS-CBN 2): Wally Bayola (Hay, Bahay! / GMA 7); Sef Cadayona (Bubble Gang / GMA 7); John Lloyd Cruz (Home Sweetie Home / ABS-CBN 2); Clarence Delgado (Goin' Bulilit / ABS-CBN 2); Jayson Gainza (Banana Sundae / ABS-CBN 2); Jose Manalo (Hay, Bahay! / GMA 7); Vic Sotto (Hay, Bahay! / GMA 7); Michael V. (Bubble Gang / GMA 7)	Winner: **Ai-Ai delas Alas** (Hay, Bahay! / GMA 7): Sunshine Garcia (Banana Sundae / ABS-CBN 2); Toni Gonzaga (Home Sweetie Home / ABS-CBN 2); Angelica Panganiban (Banana Sundae / ABS-CBN 2); Pokwang (Banana Sundae / ABS-CBN 2); Mutya Orquia (Goin' Bulilit / ABS-CBN 2); Manilyn Reynes (Pepito Manaloto / GMA 7); Chariz Solomon (Bubble Gang / GMA 7); Nova Villa (Pepito Manaloto / GMA 7)
Best Male TV Host	Best Female TV Host
Winner: **Vice Ganda** (It's Showtime / ABS-CBN 2): Ryan Agoncillo (Eat Bulaga! / GMA 7); Billy Crawford (It's Showtime / ABS-CBN 2); Robi Domingo (ASAP / ABS-CBN 2); Allan K. (Eat Bulaga! / GMA 7); Jose Manalo (Eat Bulaga! / GMA 7); Luis Manzano (ASAP / ABS-CBN 2); Piolo Pascual (ASAP / ABS-CBN 2); Alden Richards (Eat Bulaga! / GMA 7); Vic Sotto (Eat Bulaga! / GMA 7)	Winner: **Marian Rivera** (Sunday PinaSaya / GMA 7): Anne Curtis (It's Showtime / ABS-CBN 2); Toni Gonzaga (ASAP / ABS-CBN 2); Pia Guanio (Eat Bulaga! / GMA 7); Nadine Lustre (It's Showtime / ABS-CBN 2); Jolina Magdangal (ASAP / ABS-CBN 2); Maine Mendoza (Eat Bulaga! / GMA 7); Amy Perez (It's Showtime / ABS-CBN 2); Regine Velasquez (Full House Tonight / GMA 7)
Best Game Show Host(s)	Best Talent Search Program Host(s)
Winner: **Luis Manzano** (Minute To Win It/ ABS-CBN 2): Drew Arellano and Iya Villania (People vs. the Stars / GMA 7); Eugene Domingo (Celebrity Bluff / GMA 7); Jennylyn Mercado (Superstar Duets / GMA 7); Willie Revillame (Wowowin / GMA 7); Judy Ann Santos (Bet On Your Baby / ABS-CBN 2); Michael V. and Iya Villania (Lip Sync Battle Philippines / GMA 7)	Winner: **Toni Gonzaga** and **Luis Manzano** (The Voice Teens / ABS-CBN 2): Balang and Tom Rodriguez (#LIKE / GMA 7); Billy Crawford (Your Face Sounds Familiar Kids / ABS-CBN 2); Robi Domingo and Alex Gonzaga (I Can Do That / ABS-CBN 2); Toni Rose Gayda and Richard Reynoso (ASOP Music Festival / UNTV 37)
Best Educational Program Host(s)	Best Celebrity Talk Show Host(s)
Winner: **Kim Atienza** (Matanglawin / ABS-CBN 2): Drew Arellano (AHA! / GMA 7); Manny Calayan and Pie Calayan (C the Difference / GMA News TV 11); Bettina Carlos, Boy Logro and Chynna Ortaleza (Idol Sa Kusina / GMA News TV 11); Neilsen Donato and Ferdz Recio (Born to Be Wild / GMA 7); Jennylyn Mercado (Everyday Sarap with CDO / GMA News TV 11); Kyle Nofuente (Convergence / Net 25); Chris Tiu (I-Bilib / GMA 7)	Winner: **Boy Abunda** (Tonight with Boy Abunda / ABS-CBN 2): Rachel Alejandro and Christine Jacob (Real Talk / CNN Philippines 9); Suzi Entrata-Abrera and Camille Prats (MARS / GMA News TV 11); Mitzi Borromeo (Profiles / CNN Philippines 9); Melai Cantiveros, Karla Estrada and Jolina Magdangal (Magandang Buhay / ABS-CBN 2); Arnold Clavio (Tonight with Arnold Clavio / GMA News TV 11); Vice Ganda (Gandang Gabi Vice / ABS-CBN 2); Gladys Reyes (MOMents / Net 25)
Best Documentary Program Host(s)	Best Magazine Show Host(s)
Winner: **Sandra Aguinaldo** and **Kara David** (I-Witness / GMA 7): Lourd de Veyra (History with Lourd / TV5); Malou Mangahas (Investigative Documentaries / GMA News TV 11); Jiggy Manicad and Maki Pulido (Reporter's Notebook / GMA 7); Daniel Razon (Munting Pangarap / UNTV 37); Jay Taruc (Motorcycle Diaries / GMA News TV 11)	Winner: **Korina Sanchez** (Rated K / ABS-CBN 2): Love Anover, Bea Binene and Vicky Morales (Good News / GMA News TV 11); Cesar Apolinario and Susan Enriquez (I Juander / GMA News TV 11); Rovilson Fernandez (Ang Pinaka / GMA News TV 11); Marc Logan (Mga Kwento ni Marc Logan / ABS-CBN 2); Jessica Soho (Brigada / GMA News TV 11); Jessica Soho (Kapuso Mo, Jessica Soho / GMA 7)
Best Male Newscaster	Best Female Newscaster
Winner: **Arnold Clavio** (Saksi / GMA 7): Julius Babao (Bandila / ABS-CBN 2); Noli de Castro (TV Patrol / ABS-CBN 2); Mike Enriquez (24 Oras / GMA 7); Ted Failon (TV Patrol / ABS-CBN 2); Howie Severino (News to Go / GMA News TV 11); Raffy Tima (Balitanghali / GMA News TV 11)	Winner: **Bernadette Sembrano** (TV Patrol / ABS-CBN 2): Pia Arcangel (Saksi / GMA 7); Luchi Cruz-Valdes (Aksyon Prime / TV5); Kara David (News to Go / GMA News TV 11); Karen Davila (Bandila / ABS-CBN 2); Ces Drilon (Bandila / ABS-CBN 2); Vicky Morales (24 Oras / GMA 7); Jessica Soho (State of the Nation / GMA News TV 11); Mel Tiangco (24 Oras / GMA 7)
Best Morning Show Hosts	Best Public Affairs Program Host(s)
Winner: **Atom Araullo**, **Jorge Cariño**, **Winnie Cordero**, **Amy Perez**, **Anthony Taberna** and **Ariel Ureta** (Umagang Kay Ganda / ABS-CBN 2): Aikee, Andrea Bardos, Apple Chiu, Bob Crisostomo, Claire Cuenca, Nicole Facal, Julie Fernando, Davey Langit, Leo Martinez, CJ Panulaya, Phoebe Ann Publico, Jam Talana and Genive Tuban (Pambansang Almusal / Net 25); Love Anover, Pia Archanghel, Lyn Ching, Arnold Clavio, Nathaniel Cruz, Susan Enriquez, Suzi Entrata-Abrera, Ivan Mayrina, Lhar Santiago and Connie Sison (Unang Hirit / GMA 7); Greco Belgica, Julez Guiang, Diane Medina, Karla Paderna and Diane Querer (Bagong Pilipinas / PTV 4); Diego Castro III, Erica Honrado, Angela Lagunsad, Daniel Razon, Erin Tanada, Monica Verallo and Rheena Villamor-Camara (Good Morning Kuya / UNTV 37)	Winner: **Boy Abunda** (The Bottomline with Boy Abunda / ABS-CBN 2): Luchi Cruz-Valdez (Reaksyon / TV5); Rodante Marcoleta (Sa Ganang Mamamayan / Net 25); Winnie Monsod (Bawal Ang Pasaway / GMA News TV 11); Daniel Razon (Get It Straight with Daniel Razon / UNTV 37); Anthony Taberna (Tapatan ni Tunying / ABS-CBN 2); Pinky Webb (The Source / CNN Philippines 9)
Best Travel Show Host(s)	Best Lifestyle Show Host
Winner: **Drew Arellano** (Biyahe ni Drew / GMA News TV 11): Veronica Baluyut-Jimenez (Bridging Boarders / PTV 4); Baste Duterte (Lakbai / TV5); Faye de Castro (Landmarks / Net 25); Justin Lee (Biyaheng Negosyo / PTV 4)	Winner: **Solenn Heussaff** and **Rhian Ramos** (Taste Buddies / GMA News TV 11): Dyan Castillejo (Sports U / ABS-CBN 2); Angel Jacob (Leading Women / CNN Philippines 9); Anthony Pangilinan (The Boardroom / CNN Philippines 9); Ricky Reyes (The World of Gandang Ricky Reyes / GMA News TV 11)

=== Rundown ===
Number of Nominees

Network	Total #
ABS-CBN	139
PTV	7
TV5	9
GMA	101
CNN Philippines	12
GMA News TV	38
IBC	1
Net 25	15
UNTV	9
AksyonTV	3

Number of Winners (excluding Special Awards)

Network	Total #
ABS-CBN	29
GMA	17
GMA News TV	3
Net 25	2
UNTV	1

== Special awards ==
=== Ading Fernando Lifetime Achievement Awardee ===
- Vic Sotto

=== Excellence in Broadcasting Awardee ===
- Martin Andanar (Male)
- Princess Habibah Sarip-Paudac (Female)

=== German Moreno Power Tandem Award ===
- "JoshLia" (Joshua Garcia and Julia Barretto)
- "RocSan" (Rocco Nacino and Sanya Lopez)

=== Faces of the Night ===
- Robi Domingo (Male)
- Ali Forbes (Female)

=== Stars of the Night ===
- Richard Gutierrez (Male)
- Jessa Zaragoza (Female)

=== Longest Running Daytime Drama Anthology ===
- Maynila (GMA 7)

== See also ==
- PMPC Star Awards for TV
- 2017 in Philippine television
