= People vs. the Stars =

2017 Philippine television game show

- Title card
- Genre: Game show
- Created by: Marcelo "Loi" Landicho
- Presented by: Iya Villania; Drew Arellano
- Country of origin: Philippines
- Original language: Tagalog
- No. of episodes: 14

Production
- Production locations: Quezon City, Philippines
- Camera setup: Multiple-camera setup
- Running time: 40 minutes
- Production company: GMA Entertainment TV

Original release
- Network: GMA Network
- Release: January 15 – April 16, 2017

People vs. the Stars is a 2017 Philippine television game show broadcast by GMA Network. Hosted by Iya Villania and Drew Arellano, it premiered on January 15, 2017 on the network's Sunday Grande line up. The show concluded on April 16, 2017, with a total of 14 episodes.

== Gameplay ==
In People vs. the Stars, the program allows celebrities to play for a chance to win two hundred thousand pesos (PHP 200,000.00) via a variety of eight questions with respective cash values. The first seven questions has corresponding amount from 10,000 to 40,000 pesos while the eighth question is worth 50,000 pesos. The stars must answer each question in 45 seconds. If the stars fail to answer any of the questions correctly, the question's cash value will be given to the home viewers by answering the "People Question of the Week" through text.

== Ratings ==
According to AGB Nielsen Philippines' Nationwide Urban Television Audience Measurement, the pilot episode of People vs. the Stars earned an 11.2% rating. The final episode scored a 5.8% rating in People in television homes.

== Accolades ==
Accolades received by People vs. the Stars
| Year | Award | Category | Recipient | Result | Ref. |
|---|---|---|---|---|---|
| 2017 | 31st PMPC Star Awards for Television | Best Game Show | People vs. the Stars | Nominated | |
| 2017 | 31st PMPC Star Awards for Television | Best Game Show Host | Drew Arellano Iya Villania | Nominated | |
