= Pinas Sarap =

Philippine television infotainment show

- Title card
- Genre: Infotainment
- Presented by: Kara David
- Country of origin: Philippines
- Original language: Tagalog

Production
- Executive producer: Michael Del Rosario
- Camera setup: Multiple-camera setup
- Running time: 45 minutes
- Production company: GMA Public Affairs

Original release
- Network: GMA News TV (2017–20); GMA Network (2020–21); GTV (since 2021)
- Release: March 23, 2017 – present

Pinas Sarap (transl. Philippines delicious) is a Philippine television infotainment show broadcast by GMA News TV, GMA Network and GTV. Hosted by Kara David, it premiered on March 23, 2017. It moved to GMA Network on December 26, 2020 on the network's Sabado Star Power line up.

== Premise ==
The show aims its audience to understand and learn more about Filipino foods. Each episode showcases the history behind the featured local dish, as well as the latest Filipino cuisine.

== Overview ==
The production was halted in March 2020 due to the enhanced community quarantine in Luzon caused by the COVID-19 pandemic. The show resumed its programming on November 10, 2020. In February 2021, GMA News TV was rebranded as GTV, with the show being carried over.

== Accolades ==
Accolades received by Pinas Sarap
Year	Award	Category	Recipient	Result	Ref.
2018	32nd PMPC Star Awards for Television	Best Educational Program	Pinas Sarap	Nominated	
2018	32nd PMPC Star Awards for Television	Best Educational Program Host	Kara David	Nominated	
2019	33rd PMPC Star Awards for Television	Best Educational Program	Pinas Sarap	Nominated	
2019	33rd PMPC Star Awards for Television	Best Educational Program Host	Kara David	Nominated	
2021	34th PMPC Star Awards for Television	Best Educational Program	Pinas Sarap	Nominated	
2021	34th PMPC Star Awards for Television	Best Educational Program Host	Kara David	Nominated	
2023	35th PMPC Star Awards for Television	Best Educational Program	Pinas Sarap	Nominated	
2023	35th PMPC Star Awards for Television	Best Educational Program Host	Kara David	Won	
2025	37th PMPC Star Awards for Television	Best Lifestyle/Travel Show	Pinas Sarap	Nominated	
2025	37th PMPC Star Awards for Television	Best Lifestyle/Travel Show Host	Kara David	Nominated	
2025	36th PMPC Star Awards for Television	Best Educational Program	Pinas Sarap	Nominated	
2025	36th PMPC Star Awards for Television	Best Educational Program Host	Kara David	Nominated	
