= The Atom Araullo Specials =

Philippine television documentary show

- Title card
- Genre: Documentary
- Presented by: Atom Araullo
- Country of origin: Philippines
- Original language: Tagalog
- No. of episodes: 45

Production
- Camera setup: Multiple-camera setup
- Running time: 38–72 minutes
- Production company: GMA Public Affairs

Original release
- Network: GMA Network
- Release: April 1, 2018 – present

The Atom Araullo Specials is a Philippine television documentary show broadcast by GMA Network. Hosted by Atom Araullo, it premiered on April 1, 2018, on the network's Sunday Grande sa Hapon line up.

The show is streaming online on YouTube.

== Premise ==
The show features social issues of the Philippines, along with stories of Filipinos which host Atom Araullo chose to discuss and facilitate.

== Episodes ==
The Atom Araullo Specials episodes
No.	Title	Original release date
1	"Underground"	April 1, 2018
2	"Shark Land"	May 27, 2018
3	"No Leftovers"	August 26, 2018
4	"Daloy" (transl. flow)	September 30, 2018
5	"Final Destination"	October 28, 2018
6	"¡Celebremos!" (transl. let's celebrate!)	November 25, 2018
7	"Niño"	January 27, 2019
8	"Babies4Sale.PH"	February 24, 2019
9	"Saving Paradise"	March 31, 2019
10	"Fraud-ibig" (transl. fraud-love)	April 28, 2019
11	"Bird Hunt"	May 26, 2019
12	"Sa Magkabilang Dulo" (transl. in both ends)	June 30, 2019
13	"The Patient is Out"	July 28, 2019
14	"Pangil" (transl. fang)	September 29, 2019
15	"Dreams of Gold"	November 24, 2019
16	"COVID-19: Nang Tumigil ang Mundo" (transl. COVID-19: when the world stopped)	May 31, 2020
17	"Batch 2020"	October 25, 2020
18	"Pangakong Lunas" (transl. promised remedy)	November 15, 2020
19	"Dos Mil Bente" (transl. two thousand twenty)	December 13, 2020
20	"Krisis ng Sikmura" (transl. crisis of stomach)	March 21, 2021
21	"Habol Hininga: Isang Taon ng Pandemya" (transl. chasing breathe: one year of pandemic)	May 30, 2021
22	"Munting Bisig"" (transl. young arms)	July 25, 2021
23	"Team Pilipinas" (transl. team Philippines)	September 12, 2021
24	"Tara, Food Trip!" (transl. Let's go, food trip!)	November 14, 2021
25	"Dayo" (transl. outsider)	December 12, 2021
26	"Write to Vote"	March 20, 2022
27	"Mata sa Dilim" (transl. eye on dark)	June 26, 2022
28	"Anak" (transl. child)	August 7, 2022
29	"Ang Nawawala" (transl. the lost)	September 25, 2022
30	"Sexpectation vs. Reality"	November 20, 2022
31	"I Only Eat in Barong"	January 15, 2023
32	"Due Date"	March 19, 2023
33	"Hingang Malalim" (transl. breathe deeply)	May 21, 2023
34	"Bahay ni Juan" (transl. house of Juan)	July 23, 2023
35	"Batas Bata" (transl. child's law)	September 24, 2023
36	"Pag-asa" (transl. hope)	November 19, 2023
37	"Tawid-Aral" (transl. cross-study)	January 21, 2024
38	"Totoy Bagsik" (transl. Totoy power)	March 31, 2024
39	"Lupang Pangako" (transl. promised land)	May 26, 2024
40	"POGO Land"	July 21, 2024
41	"Republika ng Plastik" (transl. republic of plastic)	September 29, 2024
42	"Mga Boses Mula sa Hukay" (transl. voices from the pit)	December 8, 2024
43	"Mga Tuldok sa Laot" (transl. periods in sea)	March 30, 2025
44	"Baby Makers"	May 25, 2025
45	"Gintong Puno" (transl. Golden Tree)	July 27, 2025

== Ratings ==
According to AGB Nielsen Philippines' Nationwide Urban Television Audience Measurement People in television homes, the pilot episode of The Atom Araullo Specials earned a 7.7% rating.

== Accolades ==
Accolades received by The Atom Araullo Specials
Year	Award	Category	Recipient	Result	Ref.
2019	33rd PMPC Star Awards for Television	Best Documentary Program	The Atom Araullo Specials	Nominated	
2019	33rd PMPC Star Awards for Television	Best Documentary Program Host	Atom Araullo	Nominated	
2019	U.S. International Film & Video Festival	Gold Camera Award: Investigative/Special Reports Documentary	"Babies4Sale.PH"	Won	
2019	U.S. International Film & Video Festival	Gold Camera Award: Investigative/Special Reports Documentary	"No Leftovers"	Won	
2020	Asian Academy Creative Awards	Best Documentary Programme (One-off)	"When the World Stopped"	Won	
2020	Gandingan 2020: The 14th UPLB Isko’t Iska Multi-media Awards	Most Development Oriented Documentary	The Atom Araullo Specials	Won	
2020	42nd Catholic Mass Media Awards	Best TV Special	"COVID-19: Nang Tumigil ang Mundo"	Won	
2021	34th PMPC Star Awards for Television	Best Documentary Program	The Atom Araullo Specials	Nominated	
2021	34th PMPC Star Awards for Television	Best Documentary Program Host	Atom Araullo	Won	
2022	4th Asia Contents Awards	Best Asian Documentary	"Munting Bisig"	Won	
2023	35th PMPC Star Awards for Television	Best Documentary Program	The Atom Araullo Specials	Nominated	
2023	35th PMPC Star Awards for Television	Best Documentary Program Host	Atom Araullo	Won	
2023	ContentAsia Awards	Best Current Affairs Program	"Mata sa Dilim"	Won	
2023	New York Festivals	Gold Medal	"Mata sa Dilim"	Won	
2024	New York Festivals TV & Film Awards	Documentary: Social Justice	"Batas Bata"	Gold	
2024	New York Festivals TV & Film Awards	Documentary: Human Concerns	"Hingang Malalim"	Nominated	
2025	37th PMPC Star Awards for Television	Best Documentary Program	The Atom Araullo Specials	Nominated	
2025	37th PMPC Star Awards for Television	Best Documentary Program Host	Atom Araullo	Nominated	
2025	38th PMPC Star Awards for Television	Best Documentary Program	The Atom Araullo Specials	Pending	
2025	38th PMPC Star Awards for Television	Best Documentary Program Host	Atom Araullo	Pending	
