= Ang Pinaka =

Philippine television news magazine show

- Title card from 2019 to 2020
- Genre: News magazine
- Presented by: Pia Guanio; Rovilson Fernandez
- Country of origin: Philippines
- Original languages: Tagalog; English

Production
- Executive producer: Eva Marie A. Ercilla
- Production locations: GMA Network Center, Quezon City, Philippines
- Camera setup: Multiple-camera setup
- Running time: 45 minutes
- Production company: GMA Public Affairs

Original release
- Network: QTV/Q (November 13, 2005 – February 20, 2011); GMA News TV (March 6, 2011 – March 15, 2020)
- Release: November 13, 2005 – March 15, 2020

Ang Pinaka (transl. the most) is a Philippine television news magazine show broadcast by QTV, Q and GMA News TV. Originally hosted by Pia Guanio, it premiered on November 13, 2005 on QTV. The show moved to GMA News TV on March 6, 2011. The show concluded on March 15, 2020. Rovilson Fernandez served as the final host.

The show is streaming online on YouTube.

== Cast ==
Hosts

- Pia Guanio (2005–08)
- Rovilson Fernandez (2008–20)

Recurring cast

- Betong Sumaya
- Maey Bautista

== Production ==
The production was halted in March 2020 due to the enhanced community quarantine in Luzon caused by the COVID-19 pandemic.

== Accolades ==
Accolades received by Ang Pinaka
Year	Award	Category	Recipient	Result	Ref.
2009	Anak TV Seal Awards	Most Well-Liked TV Program	Ang Pinaka	Included	
2011	25th PMPC Star Awards for Television	Best Magazine Show	Ang Pinaka	Nominated	
2011	25th PMPC Star Awards for Television	Best Magazine Show Host	Rovilson Fernandez	Nominated	
2012	34th Catholic Mass Media Awards	Best Adult Educational/Cultural Program	Ang Pinaka	Won	
2012	26th PMPC Star Awards for Television	Best Magazine Show	Ang Pinaka	Nominated	
2012	26th PMPC Star Awards for Television	Best Magazine Show Host	Rovilson Fernandez	Nominated	
2014	Golden Screen TV Awards	Outstanding Magazine Program	"Animal Newsmakers"	Nominated	
2014	Golden Screen TV Awards	Outstanding Magazine Program Host	Rovilson Fernandez	Nominated	
2015	29th PMPC Star Awards for Television	Best Magazine Show	Ang Pinaka	Nominated	
2015	29th PMPC Star Awards for Television	Best Magazine Show Host	Rovilson Fernandez	Nominated	
2016	30th PMPC Star Awards for Television	Best Magazine Show	Ang Pinaka	Nominated	
2016	30th PMPC Star Awards for Television	Best Magazine Show Host	Rovilson Fernandez	Nominated	
2017	31st PMPC Star Awards for Television	Best Magazine Show	Ang Pinaka	Nominated	
2017	31st PMPC Star Awards for Television	Best Magazine Show Host	Rovilson Fernandez	Nominated	
2018	32nd PMPC Star Awards for Television	Best Magazine Show	Ang Pinaka	Nominated	
2018	32nd PMPC Star Awards for Television	Best Magazine Show Host	Rovilson Fernandez	Nominated	
2019	33rd PMPC Star Awards for Television	Best Magazine Show	Ang Pinaka	Nominated	
2019	33rd PMPC Star Awards for Television	Best Magazine Show Host	Rovilson Fernandez	Nominated	
2021	34th PMPC Star Awards for Television	Best Magazine Show	Ang Pinaka	Nominated	
2021	34th PMPC Star Awards for Television	Best Magazine Show Host	Rovilson Fernandez	Nominated	
