= Bawal ang Pasaway kay Mareng Winnie =

Philippine television public affairs show

- Title card from 2018 to 2020
- Genre: Public affairs
- Directed by: Melanie Lozano
- Presented by: Winnie Monsod
- Opening theme: "Bawal ang Pasaway Theme Music" by Noel Cabangon
- Country of origin: Philippines
- Original language: Tagalog

Production
- Executive producer: Mildred Fragante
- Camera setup: Multiple-camera setup
- Running time: 45 minutes
- Production company: GMA News and Public Affairs

Original release
- Network: GMA News TV
- Release: March 2, 2011 – March 17, 2020

Bawal ang Pasaway kay Mareng Winnie (transl. offenders are not allowed to miss Winnie / international title: Offenders, Beware to Mareng Winnie) is a Philippine television public affairs program broadcast by GMA News TV. Hosted by Winnie Monsod, it premiered on March 2, 2011. The show concluded on March 17, 2020.

== Overview ==
Bawal ang Pasaway was conceived of as a public affairs program to better explain societal issues to the Filipino public, along with what can be done about them, with host Winnie Monsod stating that "everybody’s talking about corruption. Nobody is saying what’s behind it and what can be done. And that’s essentially what the public affairs program will be." In 2015, Monsod admitted that she never heard of the term "pasaway" before the program's creators suggested it to her. A few of the program's interviewees included Imelda Marcos, Cristina Ponce-Enrile, and Ronald dela Rosa.

== Production ==
The production was halted in March 2020 due to the enhanced community quarantine in Luzon caused by the COVID-19 pandemic.

== Accolades ==
Accolades received by Bawal ang Pasaway kay Mareng Winnie
Year	Award	Category	Recipient	Result	Ref.
2011	Golden Screen TV Awards	Outstanding Public Affairs Program	Bawal ang Pasaway kay Mareng Winnie	Nominated	
2011	Golden Screen TV Awards	Outstanding Public Affairs Program Host	Winnie Monsod	Won	
2013	Golden Screen TV Awards	Outstanding Public Affairs Program	Bawal ang Pasaway kay Mareng Winnie	Nominated	
2013	Golden Screen TV Awards	Outstanding Public Affairs Program Host	Winnie Monsod	Won	
2014	Golden Screen TV Awards	Outstanding Public Affairs Program	"Tsinoy"	Nominated	
2014	Golden Screen TV Awards	Outstanding Public Affairs Program Host	Winnie Monsod	Nominated	
2014	28th PMPC Star Awards for Television	Best Public Affairs Program	Bawal ang Pasaway kay Mareng Winnie	Nominated	
2014	28th PMPC Star Awards for Television	Best Public Affairs Program Host	Winnie Monsod	Nominated	
2015	29th PMPC Star Awards for Television	Best Public Affairs Program	Bawal ang Pasaway kay Mareng Winnie	Nominated	
2015	29th PMPC Star Awards for Television	Best Public Affairs Program Host	Winnie Monsod	Nominated	
2017	31st PMPC Star Awards for Television	Best Public Affairs Program	Bawal ang Pasaway kay Mareng Winnie	Nominated	
2017	31st PMPC Star Awards for Television	Best Public Affairs Program Host	Winnie Monsod	Nominated	
2018	32nd PMPC Star Awards for Television	Best Public Affairs Program	Bawal ang Pasaway kay Mareng Winnie	Nominated	
2018	32nd PMPC Star Awards for Television	Best Public Affairs Program Host	Winnie Monsod	Nominated	
2019	33rd PMPC Star Awards for Television	Best Public Affairs Program	Bawal ang Pasaway kay Mareng Winnie	Nominated	
2019	33rd PMPC Star Awards for Television	Best Public Affairs Program Host	Winnie Monsod	Nominated	
2020	Gandingan 2020: The 14th UPLB Isko’t Iska Multi-media Awards	Gandingan ng Edukasyon	Winnie Monsod	Won	
2021	34th PMPC Star Awards for Television	Best Public Affairs Program	Bawal ang Pasaway kay Mareng Winnie	Nominated	
2021	34th PMPC Star Awards for Television	Best Public Affairs Program Host	Winnie Monsod	Nominated	
