= Tonight with Arnold Clavio =

Philippine television talk show

- Title card in 2020
- Also known as: TWAC
- Genre: Talk show
- Written by: Vladimir Romero
- Directed by: Noel Cabacungan
- Presented by: Arnold Clavio
- Country of origin: Philippines
- Original language: Tagalog

Production
- Executive producer: Arla Fabella
- Editor: Allen Decano
- Camera setup: Multiple-camera setup
- Running time: 45 minutes
- Production company: GMA News and Public Affairs

Original release
- Network: Q (April 5, 2010 – February 18, 2011); GMA News TV (February 28, 2011 – March 11, 2020)
- Release: April 5, 2010 – March 11, 2020

Tonight with Arnold Clavio is a Philippine television talk show broadcast by Q and GMA News TV. Hosted by Arnold Clavio, it premiered on Q on April 5, 2010. The show concluded on Q on February 18, 2011. It started airing on GMA News TV on February 28, 2011. The show concluded on GMA News TV on March 11, 2020.

== Production ==
In March 2020, the admission of a live audience in the studio and production were suspended due to the enhanced community quarantine in Luzon caused by the COVID-19 pandemic.

== Accolades ==
Accolades received by Tonight with Arnold Clavio
Year	Award	Category	Recipient	Result	Ref.
2010	24th PMPC Star Awards for Television	Best Celebrity Talk Show	Tonight with Arnold Clavio	Nominated	
2010	24th PMPC Star Awards for Television	Best Celebrity Talk Show Host	Arnold Clavio	Nominated	
2011	8th Golden Screen TV Awards	Outstanding Celebrity Talk Program	Tonight with Arnold Clavio	Won	
2011	8th Golden Screen TV Awards	Outstanding Celebrity Talk Program Host	Arnold Clavio	Won	
2011	25th PMPC Star Awards for Television	Best Celebrity Talk Show	Tonight with Arnold Clavio	Nominated	
2011	25th PMPC Star Awards for Television	Best Celebrity Talk Show Host	Arnold Clavio	Nominated	
2012	Catholic Mass Media Awards	Best Talk Show	Tonight with Arnold Clavio	Won	
2013	Golden Screen TV Awards	Outstanding Celebrity Talk Program	Tonight with Arnold Clavio	Nominated	
2013	Golden Screen TV Awards	Outstanding Celebrity Talk Program Host	Arnold Clavio	Nominated	
2014	Golden Screen TV Awards	Outstanding Celebrity Talk Program	"BB Gandanghari: Tell All"	Nominated	
2014	Golden Screen TV Awards	Outstanding Celebrity Talk Program Host	Arnold Clavio	Nominated	
2017	31st PMPC Star Awards for Television	Best Celebrity Talk Show	Tonight with Arnold Clavio	Nominated	
2017	31st PMPC Star Awards for Television	Best Celebrity Talk Show Host	Arnold Clavio	Nominated	
2018	32nd PMPC Star Awards for Television	Best Celebrity Talk Show	Tonight with Arnold Clavio	Nominated	
2018	32nd PMPC Star Awards for Television	Best Celebrity Talk Show Host	Arnold Clavio	Nominated	
2019	33rd PMPC Star Awards for Television	Best Celebrity Talk Show	Tonight with Arnold Clavio	Nominated	
2019	33rd PMPC Star Awards for Television	Best Celebrity Talk Show Host	Arnold Clavio	Nominated	
