= Daig Kayo ng Lola Ko =

Philippine television drama series

- Title card since 2024
- Also known as: My Fairy Grandmother
- Genre: Fantasy drama
- Directed by: Rico Gutierrez
- Starring: Gloria Romero
- Opening theme: "Daig Kayo ng Lola Ko" by Jillian Ward; "Ikot ng Mundo" by Zephanie
- Country of origin: Philippines
- Original language: Tagalog

Production
- Executive producers: Dhory Maiquez; Reylie Manalo
- Camera setup: Multiple-camera setup
- Running time: 30–45 minutes
- Production company: GMA Entertainment Group

Original release
- Network: GMA Network
- Release: April 30, 2017 – present

Daig Kayo ng Lola Ko (transl. my grandmother is better than you / international title: My Fairy Grandmother) is a Philippine television drama fantasy anthology series broadcast by GMA Network. Directed by Rico Gutierrez, it originally starred Gloria Romero in the title role. It premiered on April 30, 2017, on the network's Sunday Grande sa Gabi line up.

== Premise ==
Narrating the adventures of grandmother Goreng, and her grandchildren Alice and Elvis, who find themselves living with Moira, a kid who they found on the streets.

== Cast and characters ==
- Gloria Romero as Gloria "Goreng" Espino
- Jillian Ward as Alice Espino
- Chlaui Malayao as Moira Villavicencio
- David Remo as Elvis Espino
- TG Daylusan as Pipoy
- Julius Miguel as Jorrel
- Angelica Ulip as Tintin
- Frances Makil-Ignacio as Mila / Metring
- Nova Villa as Dee

== Production ==
Principal photography was halted in March 2020 due to the enhanced community quarantine in Luzon caused by the COVID-19 pandemic. The series resumed its programming on July 18, 2021.

== Ratings ==
According to AGB Nielsen Philippines' Nationwide Urban Television Audience Measurement People in television homes, the pilot episode of Daig Kayo ng Lola Ko earned an 8.5% rating. The show got its highest rating on October 29, 2017 with a 12.5% rating.

== Accolades ==
Accolades received by Daig Kayo ng Lola Ko
Year	Award	Category	Recipient	Result	Ref.
2017	31st PMPC Star Awards for Television	Best Horror/Fantasy Program	Daig Kayo ng Lola Ko	Nominated	
2018	32nd PMPC Star Awards for Television	Best Horror/Fantasy Program	Daig Kayo ng Lola Ko	Nominated	
2019	Anak TV Seal Awards		Daig Kayo ng Lola Ko	Won	
2019	33rd PMPC Star Awards for Television	Best Horror/Fantasy Program	Daig Kayo ng Lola Ko	Won	
2020	42nd Catholic Mass Media Awards	Best Children & Youth Program	Daig Kayo ng Lola Ko	Won	
2021	34th PMPC Star Awards for Television	Best Horror/Fantasy Program	Daig Kayo ng Lola Ko	Won	
2023	35th PMPC Star Awards for Television	Best Horror/Fantasy Program	Daig Kayo ng Lola Ko	Won	
2025	38th PMPC Star Awards for Television	Best Mini Series	Daig Kayo ng Lola Ko	Nominated	
2025	37th PMPC Star Awards for Television	Best Mini Series	Daig Kayo ng Lola Ko	Nominated	
