= Kesayasaya =

2020–21 Philippine television musicial series

- Genre: Musical Sitcom
- Created by: Rhandy Reyes
- Developed by: EBC Net25
- Written by: Rhandy Reyes; FM Aguas
- Directed by: Jose Mari Reyes
- Country of origin: Philippines
- Original language: Filipino

Production
- Executive producer: Jonathan Pardo
- Camera setup: Multiple-camera setup
- Running time: 60 minutes
- Production company: Eagle Broadcasting Corporation

Original release
- Network: Net 25
- Release: September 27, 2020 – 2021

Kesayasaya is a Philippine musical sitcom that honours Overseas Filipino Workers and their families in the country. Starred by veteran actors, singers and impersonators and look-alikes of various actors, led by Pilita Corrales, Vina Morales and Robin Padilla, Kesayasaya is the second sitcom (after Hapi ang Buhay) to be produced and aired by Eagle Broadcasting Corporation's Net 25, and shown every Sunday from 6:30 pm to 7:30 pm (PST).

== Cast ==
- Vina Morales as Ms. K
- Pilita Corrales as Mommy G
- Darius Razon as Papa D
- Eva Vivar as Mommy Eva
- Diego Salvador as Orly
- Sherylane Castor as Angie
- Cynthia Garcia as Mandyer
- Joel Trinidad, Alvin Olalia, Zander Khan, Efren Montes and Lon Mendoza as Senti Boys
- Ronnie German as Manny Pa-Cute (Manny Pacquiao look-alike)
- Gilbert Orcine as Cheetah-Eh (Rene Requiestas look-alike)
- Jonathan Garcia as Boyet de Leon (Christopher de Leon look-alike)
- Robin Padilla as Carding Magtanggol
- Boobsie Wonderland
- Kitkat
- Marcelito Pomoy
