= Drew Arellano =

Filipino actor and host (born 1980)

- Born: Andrew James Estrella Arellano (Note: Although born in the United States, Drew Arellano still possesses his mother's maiden name (Estrella) as is the convention in the Philippines as indicated on his birth record.); January 16, 1980 (age 46); San Jose, California, U.S.
- Education: De La Salle University (Marketing Management)
- Occupations: Actor, host
- Years active: 2003–present
- Agent: Sparkle GMA Artist Center (since 2003)
- Spouse: Iya Villania (m. 2014)
- Children: 5
- Relatives: Robert Raymond M. Estrella (cousin); Conrado B. Estrella Jr. (uncle); Conrado F. Estrella Sr. (grandfather); Conrado M. Estrella III (cousin)

Andrew James "Drew" Estrella Arellano (Tagalog pronunciation: [ʔɐrɛlˈjanɔ]; born January 16, 1980) is a Filipino actor and host. He is one of the traveling hosts of the daily morning show, Unang Hirit and the host of informative/educational show AHA! and Biyahe ni Drew on GMA Network. He is also the host of the now defunct show Balikbayan, Weekend Gateway on GTV (formerly known as QTV/Q, and GMA News TV).

== Early life and career ==
Andrew James Estrella Arellano was born to Aga Arellano and Bernie Estrella-Arellano on January 16, 1980, in San Jose, California, USA. He has two brothers and two sisters. He graduated high school at Xavier School in March 1997, and he graduated Marketing Management at De La Salle University in October 2001 (also the same university as his wife Iya Villania). Arellano formerly worked in an advertising agency before he began his showbiz career. Arellano's first stint in showbiz on TV was in a youth-oriented show called Click, with longtime girlfriend and now wife, Iya Villania. He won his first solo award from PMPC Star Awards For TV as 'Best Travel Show Host' for Balikbayan, formerly aired on QTV 11 (then GMA News TV; now GTV 27), and a year later he won again in a same category. He also won the Unang Hirit Barkada for Unang Hirit as 'Best Morning Show Hosts' also at PMPC Star Awards For TV, three times in a row.

Arellano currently hosts AHA! an educational show on GMA Network, and the travel show Biyahe ni Drew on GMA News TV which has several viewers as it explores the beautiful islands of the Philippines and the countries outside it. He has shown talent in his job which paved way to his long running show "Biyahe ni Drew".

== Personal life ==
Arellano enjoys basketball and triathlon which has won him various medals in a triathlon competition held every year.

In 2004, Arellano began dating actress and television presenter Iya Villania. They married in Nasugbu, Batangas in January 2014. The couple have five children. In April 2025, Arellano underwent a vasectomy after welcoming their fifth child.

In January 2022, Arellano, alongside Villania and their three children, tested positive for COVID-19.

== Filmography ==
=== Film ===
- My First Romance (2003)
- Spirit of the Glass (2004)

=== Television ===
Year	Title	Role
2023	Comedy Island Philippines	
2023	Zero Kilometers Away	Special Participation
2020	Mars Pa More	Guest
2020	New Normal: The Survival Guide	Host
2018	Mars	Guest
2017	People vs. the Stars	Host
--	Home Foodie	Host
--	Sunday All Stars	Guest
2014	Don't Lose the Money	Contestant
2015	Sabado Badoo	Cameo Role
	Wasak	Guest
2017	Sunday PinaSaya	Guest
	Bogart Case Files	Guest
	Boys Ride Out	
	Network News	
--	Bonakid Pre-School's Ready Set Laban	
--	The Ryzza Mae Show	Guest
--	Celebrity Bluff	Contestant
--	Tunay Na Buhay	
--	300 Kilometro: Isang Paglalakbay	
--	Puso ng Pasko: Artista Challenge	
--	Survivor Philippines: Celebrity Showdown	Guest Host
--	Party Pilipinas	
--	Happy Land	
2010–2025	Aha!	Host
--	Art Angel	
--	Pinoy Meets World England Episode	
--	Coca-Cola's Ride To Fame	
--	Lovely Day	Guest
--	Bahay Mo Ba 'To?	Guest
--	Extra Challenge	
--	Maynila	
--	SOP Gigsters	
--	Unang Hirit	
--	All Together Now	
--	CLICK Barkada Hunt	
--	Click	
--	Biyahe ni Drew	
--	Weekend Getaway	
--	May Trabaho Ka!	Guest
--	Balikbayan	
--	Stoplight TV	
--	Paghilom	
--	Auto Extreme	
--	Basketball Show	Guest
2003	Retro TV	Host
2004–2006	Wazzup Wazzup	
2004–2006	Points of View	Host
	Matanglawin	Cameo Role

== Awards and nominations ==
Year	Award giving body	Category	Nominated work	Results
2005	19th PMPC Star Awards for Television	Best Morning Show Hosts	Unang Hirit	Nominated
2006	20th PMPC Star Awards for Television	Best Morning Show Hosts	Unang Hirit	Nominated
2007	21st PMPC Star Awards for Television	Best Morning Show Hosts	Unang Hirit	Nominated
2008	22nd PMPC Star Awards for Television	Best Talent Search Program (with Karel Marquez)	"Coca-Cola's Ride To Fame Yes To Dream"	Nominated
2008	22nd PMPC Star Awards for Television	Best Travel Show Host	Balikbayan	Nominated
2008	22nd PMPC Star Awards for Television	Best Morning Show Hosts	Unang Hirit	Won
2009	23rd PMPC Star Awards for Television	Best Travel Host	Balikbayan	Won
2010	24th PMPC Star Awards for Television	Best Travel Host	Balikbayan	Won
2015	29th PMPC Star Awards for Television	Best Travel Host	Biyahe ni Drew	Won
2016	30th PMPC Star Awards for Television	Best Travel Host	Biyahe ni Drew	Won
2017	UP's Gandingan Awards 2017	Gandingan ng Edukasyon	AHA!	Won
2017	UP's Gandingan Awards 2017	Gandingan ng Kalikasan	Biyahe ni Drew	Won
2017	31st PMPC Star Awards for Television	Best Travel Show Host	Biyahe ni Drew	Won
