= Get It Straight with Daniel Razon =

Philippine television show

- Also known as: Get It Straight
- Genre: Current affairs/Talk show/Reality show
- Created by: Progressive Broadcasting Corporation
- Developed by: UNTV
- Directed by: Angelito J. De Guzman
- Starring: Daniel Razon
- Country of origin: Philippines
- Original languages: Filipino; English

Production
- Production location: Philippines
- Camera setup: Multi-camera setup
- Running time: 45 minutes (2010–2013); 30 minutes (2013–2015); 60 minutes (2015–2023)

Original release
- Network: UNTV
- Release: July 5, 2010 – September 15, 2023

Get It Straight with Daniel Razon is a Philippine television public affairs show broadcast by UNTV. Hosted by Daniel Razon, it aired from July 5, 2010 to September 15, 2023, replacing Get It Straight with Jay and Willie.

Its guests are mostly government officials and personalities including the private sector, the program discusses issues and information for the interest of its viewers and the public.

== Host ==
- Daniel Razon

== Awards ==
- 2011 Golden Screen TV Awards – Outstanding Celebrity Talk Program Finalist
- Gandingan Awards (5TH UPLB Isko't Iska's Broadcast Choice Awards)- Best Development-Oriented Talk Show Finalist
- 2012 Gandingan Awards (6TH UPLB Isko't Iska's Broadcast Choice Awards)- Best Development-Oriented Talk Show Finalist
- 2013 Gandingan Awards (6TH UPLB Isko't Iska's Broadcast Choice Awards)- Best Development-Oriented Talk Show Finalist

Year	Association	Category	Nominee(s)	Result
2016	AnakTV	AnakTV Seal Award	Get It Straight with Daniel Razon	Awarded
2018	AnakTV	AnakTV Seal Award	Get It Straight with Daniel Razon	Awarded

== Episodes ==
=== January 2018–December 2018 ===
Air Date	Guest(s)	Dept./Agency	Episode Topic	Link
Jan 22, 2018	Jonathan Malaya (1/1)	DILG	DILG Asst. Secy. Jonathan Malaya talks about federalism and PDP-Laban's proposed model	Watch
Jan 23, 2018	Janette Garin (1/1)	DOH	Ex-DOH chief Janette Garin explains her stand on Dengvaxia fiasco	Watch
Jan 24, 2018	PDir. Leo Angelo Leuterio (1/2); MGen. Melchor Rosales (1/2); Lt. Gen. Jaime de los Santos (1/1)	PMA, PNP	PMAAAI top officials on PMA and PNPA trainings, security-related issues	Watch
Jan 26, 2018	Dep. Dir. Mhel Plabasan (1/1); Miguel Cuneta (1/1)	BSP	The truth about digital currency technology, bitcoin and other cryptocurrencies	Watch
Feb 2, 2018	Gen. Leo Angelo Leuterio (2/2); Gen. Melchor Rosales (Ret.) (2/2); Cookie Alonzo (1/1)	PNP	Experts discuss Philippine firearms regulation in fighting criminality, gun violence	Watch
Feb 5, 2018	Lina Sarmiento (1/1)	HRVCB	Chair Lina Sarmiento on distributing full reparation to human rights victims	Watch
Feb 6, 2018	Amado Valdez (1/1)	SSS	Chairman Amado Valdez discusses expected SSS contribution hike	Watch
Feb 12, 2018	Dir. James Jimenez (1/2)	Comelec	Comelec spokesman James Jimenez on pushing for 2018 polls	Watch
Feb 13, 2018	Jun Magno (Stop & Go Transport Coalition) (1/2); Undersecy. Thomas Orbos (1/3)	DOTr	DOTr and transport group discuss conflicts on jeepney phaseout and modernization	Watch
Feb 14, 2018	Undersecy. Jesus Mateo (1/1)	DepEd	Social experiment on malls enforcing school hours ban	Watch
Feb 15, 2018	Betty Gendeve (1/1)	MMDA	Social experiment shows public behavior on "Bawal Umihi Dito" zones	Watch
Feb 16, 2018	Undersecy. Martin Diño (1/1)	DILG	Undersecy. Martin Diño talks about plans for barangay affairs, anti-drug campaign	Watch
Feb 21, 2018	Secy. Harry Roque (1/2)	PCOO	Secy. Harry Roque on issues about fake news, Philippine Rise and frigate deal	Watch
Feb 27, 2018	Secy. Silvestre Bello III (1/2)	DOLE	Secretary Silvestre Bello III on OFW deployment ban to Kuwait and other labor concerns	Watch
Feb 28, 2018	Teresita Herbosa (1/1)	SEC	Chairperson Herbosa justifies SEC revocation of Rappler's registration	Watch
Mar 1, 2018	Gary Hong (1/1)		Autobahn Motors: Vending Machines for Cars | Teki Teki	Watch
Mar 1, 2018	Rico Deang (1/1)		Pinoy Artemis Bartender | Iba Ang Pinoy	Watch
Mar 2, 2018	Orion Perez Dumdum (1/2)	CoRRECT	Orion Perez Dumdum on constitutional and economic reform agendas of CoRRECT Movement	Watch
Mar 2, 2018	Con. Gen. Victorio Dimagiba Jr. (1/1)	Phil. Embassy	Consul General Victorio Dimagiba Jr. talks about the condition of OFWs in Singapore	Watch
Mar 7, 2018	Secy. Manny Piñol (1/3)	DA	Secretary Manny Piñol talks about Philippine rice supply issues, agricultural programs	Watch
Mar 16, 2018	Bernard Olalia (1/1)	POEA	POEA Administrator Bernard Olalia on illegal recruitment and other OFW concerns	Watch
Mar 20, 2018	VP Leni Robredo (1/1)	VP	VP Leni Robredo talks about projects, national issues and criticisms	Watch
Mar 21, 2018	Arnell Ignacio (1/1)	OWWA	OWWA Administrator Arnell Ignacio talks about programs for OFW welfare	Watch
May 2, 2018	Dir. Gen. Oscar Albayalde (1/1)	PNP	PNP Chief Oscar Albayalde talks about his plans of fortifying police competency and integrity	Watch
May 4, 2018	Jimmy Bondoc (1/1)	PAGCOR	Jimmy Bondoc talks about plans and challenges as PAGCOR official	Watch
May 25, 2018	Dir. Gen. Ronald dela Rosa (1/4)	BuCor	BuCor Chief Ronald dela Rosa bares his plans for securing NBP	Watch
Jun 19, 2018	Stop & Go Transport Coalition (2/2); Undersecy. Thomas Orbos (2/3)	DOTr	Transport group shows their own rehabilitated jeep that's compliant w/ the PUV modernization program	Watch
Jun 20, 2018	Cory Quirino (1/1)	VACC	VACC President Cory Quirino discusses anti-criminality drive toward a safe PH	Watch
Jul 10, 2018	Isidro Lapeña (1/1)	BOC	Customs Commissioner Isidro Lapeña talks about his strict leadership against corruption	Watch
Jul 13, 2018	Orion Perez Dumdum (2/2)	CoRRECT	Orion Perez Dumdum points out loopholes in federal charter draft	Watch
Aug 13, 2018	Attorney Glenn Chong (1/2)	Comelec	Attorney Glenn Chong speaks out on alleged poll fraud vs Comelec and Smartmatic	Watch
Aug 14, 2018	Secy. Silvestre Bello III (2/2)	DOLE	Secretary Bello talks about corruption allegations and contractualization issue	Watch
Aug 22, 2018	Asst. Secy. Mocha Uson (1/2); Andrew Olivar (1/1)	PCOO	Asst. Secy. Mocha Uson and Drew Olivar respond to federalism dance video backlash, other political issues	Watch
Aug 24, 2018	Ed Monreal (1/1)	NAIA	MIAA GM Ed Monreal on NAIA runway mess, other airport setbacks	Watch
Sep 18, 2018	Nikki Coseteng (1/1)	DPWH	Former Senator Nikki Coseteng exposes alleged substandard steel bars, safety issues	Watch
Sep 24, 2018	Secy. Manny Piñol (2/3)	DA	DA Secy. Piñol on Philippine agri issues: bukbok rice, galunggong and 'legalized' rice smuggling	Watch
Oct 4, 2018	Mocha Uson (2/2)	PCOO	Mocha Uson clarifies issues about her resignation	Watch
Oct 24, 2018	PCSupt. Rhodel Sermonia (1/1)	PNP	PCRG head Sermonia talks about Philippine and global community relations efforts	Watch
Dec 3, 2018	Asst. Secy. RJ Echiverri (1/1)	DILG	Asst. Secy. RJ Echiverri talks about DILG's barangay drug-clearing program	Watch
Dec 7, 2018	BGen. Edgard Arevalo (1/1)	AFP	AFP spox BGen Edgard Arevalo on military efforts in resolving national security issues	Watch
Dec 11, 2018	Dir. James Jimenez (2/2)	Comelec	Dir. James Jimenez on Comelec's preparation to ensure a credible 2019 midterm polls	Watch

=== May 2018–March 2019 (2019 Midterm Elections interviews) ===
Air Date	Guest(s)	Candidacy	Episode Topic	Link
May 8, 2018	Sen. JV Ejercito (1/2)	Senator	Sen. JV Ejercito on running for re-election in 2019, political dynasty in Philippine govt.	Watch
Sep 4, 2018	Gov. Imee Marcos (1/3)	Senator	Gov. Imee Marcos talks about government issues, projects and plans for Ilocos Norte	Watch
Nov 21, 2018	Gen. Ronald dela Rosa (Ret.) (2/4)	Senator	Ret. Gen. Ronald "Bato" dela Rosa talks about joining 2019 Senate race	Watch
Jan 4, 2019	Neri Colmenares (1/1)	Senator	Leftist leader Neri Colmenares talks about his platforms for Senate race	Watch
Jan 7, 2019	Attorney Romulo Macalintal (1/1)	Senator	Attorney Romulo Macalintal talks about his Senate candidacy and plans for senior citizens	Watch
Jan 8, 2019	Rafael Alunan III (1/1)	Senator	Senate bet Rafael Alunan III lays out platforms for Senate run	Watch
Jan 9, 2019	Francis Tolentino (1/1)	Senator	Former Secretary Francis Tolentino on his 2019 Senate candidacy	Watch
Jan 10, 2019	Dr. Willie Ong (1/1)	Senator	Dr. Willie Ong talks about his 2019 Senate bid and Philippine health care system	Watch
Jan 11, 2019	Sen. JV Ejercito (2/2)	Senator	Senator JV Ejercito talks about his re-election bid in 2019 midterm polls	Watch
Jan 14, 2019	Florin Hilbay (1/1)	Senator	Ex-SolGen Florin Hilbay talks about his platforms for the 2019 Senate race	Watch
Jan 15, 2019	Gary Alejano (1/1)	Senator	Rep. Gary Alejano on his Senate run, West Philippine Sea and martial law	Watch
Jan 16, 2019	Harry Roque (2/2)	Senator	Then-former Secy. Harry Roque talks about his platforms in his 2019 Senate bid	Watch
Jan 18, 2019	Samira Gutoc-Tomawis (1/1)	Senator	Opposition Senate bet Samira Gutoc talks about her platforms for the 2019 midterm polls	Watch
Jan 21, 2019	Attorney Chel Diokno (1/1)	Senator	Attorney Chel Diokno discusses 2019 Senate run and issues in Philippine justice system	Watch
Jan 22, 2019	Melchor Chavez (1/1)	Senator	Ex-journalist Melchor Chavez to push reforms in land titling if victorious in Senate bid	Watch
Jan 23, 2019	Butch Valdes (1/1)	Senator	CNG founder Butch Valdes seeks to end political dynasty and corruption if he wins in Senate bid	Watch
Jan 29, 2019	Sen. Cynthia Villar (1/1)	Senator	Senator Cynthia Villar eyes dairy farming and more agri programs if re-elected	Watch
Jan 30, 2019	Attorney Erin Tañada (1/1)	Senator	Ex-Rep. Erin Tañada eyes programs for farmers and laborers if elected in Senate	Watch
Feb 1, 2019	Attorney Sonny Matula (1/1)	Senator	Attorney Sonny Matula to prioritize Filipino workers' empowerment if elected to Senate	Watch
Feb 4, 2019	Attorney Larry Gadon (1/1)	Senator	Attorney Larry Gadon to ease power rate hike and reform education system if he wins in Senate run	Watch
Feb 5, 2019	Gov. Imee Marcos (2/3)	Senator	Gov. Imee Marcos eyes supplemental feeding and lowering of food prices if elected senator	Watch
Feb 6, 2019	Jiggy Manicad (1/1)	Senator	Jiggy Manicad to pass laws on food security and disaster preparedness if elected as senator	Watch
Feb 7, 2019	Rep. Ron Salo (1/1)	Senator	Rep. Ron Salo to continue advocacies on healthcare and OFW welfare if reelected	Watch
Feb 8, 2019	Attorney Glenn Chong (2/2)	Senator	Attorney Glenn Chong will continue poll fraud battle vs Smartmatic & Comelec in his 2019 senatorial bid	Watch
Feb 11, 2019	Gen. Ronald dela Rosa (Ret.) (3/4)	Senator	Ret. Gen. Ronald 'Bato' Dela Rosa to focus on law enforcement and security if elected senator	Watch
Feb 12, 2019	Fmr Gov. E.R. Ejercito (1/1)	Governor, Laguna	Laguna Ex-Gov ER Ejercito to bring quality education and health care services if reelected	Watch
Feb 13, 2019	Fmr Vice Mayor Francis Zamora (1/2)	Mayor, San Juan City	Francis Zamora to transform San Juan into a 'smart city' if he wins in mayoralty bid	Watch
Feb 18, 2019	Mayor Marcelino Teodoro (1/1)	Mayor, Marikina	Marikina Mayor Marcelino Teodoro eyes expansion of free education if reelected	Watch
Feb 19, 2019	Fmr DOTr Undersecy. Thomas Orbos (3/3)	Congressman, 1st District of Pangasinan	Former Undersecy. Tim Orbos to resolve water supply problem in Pangasinan if elected	Watch
Feb 20, 2019	Rep. Ruffy Biazon (1/1)	Congressman, Lone District of Muntinlupa	Re-election seeker Rep. Ruffy Biazon bares platform for the upcoming elections and stances on key issues	Watch
Feb 22, 2019	Cllr. Vico Sotto (1/1)	Mayor, Pasig	Cllr. Vico Sotto to prioritize health care related programs if elected as Mayor of Pasig	Watch
Feb 26, 2019	Gov. Ramil Hernandez (1/1)	Governor, Laguna	Re-election seeker Gov. Ramil Hernandez commits to continue and improve public services in Laguna	Watch
Feb 27, 2019	Mayor Tony Carolino (1/1)	Congressman, 4th District of Laguna	Laguna Mayor Tony Carolino will push for Laguna's 4th district development if he wins in 2019 polls	Watch
Mar 6, 2019	Fmr Mayor Florencio Bernabe (1/1)	Mayor, Parañaque City	Laguna Mayor Tony Carolino will push for Laguna's 4th district development if he wins in 2019 polls	Watch
Mar 8, 2019	Attorney Amado Bagatsing (1/1)	Vice Mayor, City of Manila	Vice mayoral bet, attorney Amado Bagatsing expresses support to Manila Bay reclamation project	Watch
Mar 11, 2019	Attorney Fidel Nograles (1/1)	Congressman, 2nd District of Rizal	Attorney Fidel Nograles to seek division of the second district of Rizal in the Congress	Watch
Mar 13, 2019	Mayor Edwin Olivarez (1/2)	Mayor, Parañaque City	Re-election seeking Mayor Olivarez refutes PUP Taguig closure speculation & poor health service allegation	Watch
Mar 26, 2019	Edu Manzano (1/1)	Congressman, Lone district of San Juan City	Congressional bet Edu Manzano talks about his plans for the millennials and elderly of San Juan	Watch
Mar 27, 2019	Ricky Yabut (1/1)	Mayor, Makati City	Makati City mayoral candidate Ricky Yabut vows to solve corruption and educational system issues	Watch

=== February 2019–May 2019 ===
Air Date	Guest(s)	Dept./Agency	Episode Topic	Link
Feb 15, 2019	Attorney Ivan John Uy (1/1)	Comelec	Former CICT chair and attorney Ivan John Uy talks about the automated election system	Watch
Mar 5, 2019	Eugene De Vera (1/1)	HOR	Ex-partylist representative Eugene De Vera airs his side about his expulsion from the House	Watch
Apr 24, 2019	Secy. Francisco Duque III (1/1)	DOH	DOH Secy. Francisco Duque III answers questions on the most pressing health issues in PH	Watch
Apr 26, 2019	Secy. Manny Piñol (3/3)	DA	DA Secy. Manny Piñol answers concerns on the effects of El Niño and the Rice Tariffication Law	Watch
May 1, 2019	Secy. Salvador Panelo (1/1)	Pres. Spokesman	Presidential spokesman Salvador Panelo addresses worries over Duterte admin's loan deal with China	Watch
May 3, 2019	Asst. Secy. Edgar Galvante (1/1)	LTO	LTO chief Asst. Secy. Edgar Galvante explains "doble-plaka" & speaks on alleged anomalies in their office	Watch
May 17, 2019	Mayor Francis Zamora (2/2)	LGU	San Juan Mayor-elect Francis Zamora on his plans after ending Estrada clan's control over the city	Watch
May 21, 2019	Mayor Edwin Olivarez (2/2)	LGU	Re-elected Parañaque City Mayor Edwin Olivarez talks about offering improved healthcare services	Watch
May 22, 2019	Sen. Ronald dela Rosa (4/4)	Senate	Senator Ronald Dela Rosa responds to critics and discloses his plans in the Senate	Watch
May 31, 2019	Sen. Imee Marcos (3/3)	Senate	Senator-elect Imee Marcos talks about her plans in the Senate to fulfill her campaign promises	Watch

== See also ==
- Progressive Broadcasting Corporation
- UNTV Public Service
- Daniel Razon
- Good Morning Kuya
