= Pinoy True Stories =

Filipino TV series or program

- Genre: News magazine, Documentary
- Directed by: various
- Presented by: various
- Opening theme: various
- Country of origin: Philippines
- Original language: Filipino

Production
- Executive producer: various
- Running time: 30 minutes
- Production company: ABS-CBN News and Current Affairs

Original release
- Network: ABS-CBN; DZMM TeleRadyo (early broadcast); Jeepney TV (encore broadcast)
- Release: December 3, 2012 – May 4, 2020

Pinoy True Stories was a collective title of five docu-news magazine programs produced by ABS-CBN News and Current Affairs, and hosted by journalists and anchors from the network.

Pinoy True Stories premiered on December 3, 2012 on ABS-CBN, each of the five programs were previously aired every weekday afternoons on the Kapamilya Gold afternoon block. On December 7, 2015, all the five programs of Pinoy True Stories has been moved to late weeknights.

The five programs were cancelled on May 5, 2020 due to the closure of ABS-CBN's free-to-air stations following the cease and desist order issued by the National Telecommunications Commission.

== Hosts ==
Final hosts

- Dyan Castillejo (for Sports U)
- Julius Babao (for Mission Possible; formerly for Bistado)
- Karen Davila (for My Puhunan; formerly for Engkwentro and 3-in-1)
- Jeff Canoy (for #NoFilter; formerly for Red Alert)
- Chiara Zambrano (for #NoFilter)
- Abner Mercado (for #NoFilter)
- Raphael Bosano (for #NoFilter)
- Kori Quintos (for #NoFilter)
- Jacque Manabat (for #NoFilter)
- Jeck Batallones (for #NoFilter)
- Kevin Manalo (for #NoFilter)
- Sherrie Ann Torres (for #NoFilter)

Former hosts

- Doris Bigornia (for Mutya ng Masa)
- Maan Macapagal (for Saklolo)
- Dominic Almelor (for Saklolo)
- K Brosas (for 3-in-1)
- Atty. Claire Castro (for 3-in-1)
- Atom Araullo (for Red Alert; formerly for Hiwaga and RealiTV)
- Anthony Taberna (for TNT: Tapatan ni Tunying; formerly for Demandahan)

== Final programs ==
=== Mission Possible ===
In Mission Possible, Julius Babao seeks out the inspirational stories of ordinary Filipino people with love, and how their dreams will turn into possible. The segment currently airs every Saturdays, with replays on Monday mornings and late nights. It premiered on February 9, 2015, replacing Bistado.

=== My Puhunan ===
In My Puhunan (My Investment, stylized as my PUHUNAN), Karen Davila talks about various types of business and employees. The segment currently airs every Saturdays, with replay on Tuesday late nights and on Thursday mornings. It premiered on July 17, 2013, replacing Saklolo it ended on February 4, 2015, and returned on July 7, 2015.

=== #NoFilter ===
#NoFilter talks about the daily life of every Filipino individual through a point-of-view by a documentarist. The segment airs every Wednesdays with a replay every Friday mornings. It premiered on May 1, 2019, replacing Red Alert.

=== Sports U ===
Sports U is a sequel to the long-running Sports Unlimited. Dyan Castillejo will profile the lives of Filipino athletes from various sports. The segment airs every Thursdays. It premiered on February 12, 2015, replacing the Thursday timeslot of TNT: Tapatan ni Tunying.

=== Local Legends ===
Local Legends talks about the unique heritages of local foods, arts, musics, and cultural icons. The segment airs every Fridays with a replay every Tuesday mornings. It premiered on May 3, 2019, replacing TNT: Tapatan ni Tunying.

== Previous programs ==
=== Bistado ===
In Bistado (Busted), Julius Babao reported on cases of abuse, neglect, or cruelty, as well as corrupt practices in government and various modi operandi of criminals. The segment aired every Monday. It premiered on December 3, 2012, and ended on February 2, 2015.

=== Engkwentro ===
In Engkwentro (Encounter), Karen Davila mediated between clashing parties in relationships, families, and neighborhoods to help them resolve conflicts. The segment aired every Tuesday. It premiered on December 4, 2012, and ended on July 9, 2013.

=== Saklolo ===
In Saklolo (Help!), news reporters Maan Macapagal and Dominic Almelor helped people in accidents or calamities or are experiencing maltreatment. The segment aired every Wednesday. It premiered on December 5, 2012, and ended on July 10, 2013.

=== Demandahan ===
In Demandahan (Accuse), Anthony Taberna provided advice to help resolve legal disputes in court. The segment aired every Thursday. It premiered on December 6, 2012, and ended on July 11, 2013.

=== Hiwaga ===
In Hiwaga (Mystery), Atom Araullo explored mysterious phenomena and supernatural occurrences. The segment aired every Friday. It premiered on December 7, 2012, and ended on March 14, 2014.

=== Mutya ng Masa ===
In Mutya ng Masa (Pearl of People), Doris Bigornia talks about simple interests, problems and difficulties, and easy sources of happiness that every normal Filipino encounters every day. The segment aired every Tuesday. It premiered on July 16, 2013, replacing Engkwentro, and ended on February 3, 2015.

=== 3-in-1 ===
In the live talk show 3-in-1, Karen Davila, K Brosas and Atty. Claire Castro discussed a wide variety of topics, including news and general interest stories. The segment aired every Tuesday. It premiered on February 10, 2015, replacing Mutya ng Masa, and ended on June 30, 2015.

=== RealiTV ===
In RealiTV, Atom Araullo aired death-defying home videos from various parts of the world. The segment aired every Wednesday. It premiered on February 11, 2015, replacing My Puhunan, and ended on July 1, 2015.

=== Red Alert ===
In Red Alert (stylized as REDALERT), Atom Araullo and Jeff Canoy provided tips for surviving life-threatening situations, such as crimes, accidents, and natural disasters. The segment aired every Friday, and later Wednesday. Araullo left the program (after he transferred to GMA Network) and was replaced by Jeff Canoy onwards. It premiered on March 21, 2014, replacing Hiwaga, and ended on February 6, 2015. It returned on July 8, 2015.

=== TNT: Tapatan ni Tunying ===
In Tapatan ni Tunying (One-on-One with Tunying), Anthony Taberna interviewed personalities and politicians. The segment aired every Thursday, and later Friday. It premiered on July 18, 2013, replacing Demandahan, and ended on April 27, 2019.

== See also ==
- List of programs broadcast by ABS-CBN
