= 2011 in Philippine television =

The following is a list of events affecting Philippine television in 2011. Events listed include television show debuts, finales, cancellations, and channel launches, closures and rebrandings, as well as information about controversies and carriage disputes.

== Events ==
=== February ===
- February 11: ABS-CBN Corporation and Solar Entertainment Corporation announced a 8-season deal with the National Basketball Association for the league's official broadcast rights in the Philippines effective February 19 with the 2010–11 season on ABS-CBN, Studio 23 (until January 15, 2014) and S+A. Meanwhile, Basketball TV continued to air the games daily.
- February 20:
  - After 5 years of broadcast, Q (VHF 11) ended its commercial operations on dawn of Sunday until it signed off completely on February 26 & 27.
  - Angeline Quinto proclaimed as the first Star Power Female Pop Superstar.
- February 21: AksyonTV (UHF 41), finally launched as the first news and sports channel in the country's free TV.
- February 26:
  - The University of Santo Tomas Growling Tigers clinched the UAAP Season 73 men's volleyball title after defeating the Far Eastern University Tamaraws 2–0 in game 2 of the best-of-three finals series held at The Arena in San Juan. This was their 4th consecutive volleyball championship title.
  - The De La Salle University Lady Spikers clinched the UAAP Season 73 women's volleyball title after defeating the University of Santo Tomas Growling Tigresses 2–0 in game 2 of the best-of-three finals series held at The Arena in San Juan. This was their 6th volleyball championship title since they last won in 2009.
- February 28: GMA Network's first free-to-air news and public affairs channel in the Philippines on Channel 11, GMA News TV, was officially launched.

=== March ===
- March 2: ETC moves to Radio Philippines Network (VHF 9) from Southern Broadcasting Network (UHF 21) after Solar privatized the network. On the other hand, Talk TV (now RPTV) was launched by Solar Television Network for airing on SBN.
- March 13: Joseph the Artist was hailed as the Ultimate Talentado in Talentadong Pinoy Season 2, the Battle of the Champions of which were held at Ynares Sports Arena, Antipolo City.

=== May ===
- May 1: The ABS-CBN News Channel celebrated its 15th anniversary.
- May 14: True Colors wins as Showtime's third grand champion, the grand finals of which were held at Ynares Sports Arena, Antipolo City.

=== June ===
- June 5: IBC 13 signed a blocktime agreement with TV5 Network Inc.'s sports division Sports5 to air live sports coverage via its new programming block AKTV was officially launched.
- June 12: ABS-CBN launched their Lupang Hinirang MTV respectively which also aired on Studio 23.
- June 18: Rizal Technological University proclaimed as Eat Bulaga!'s Pinoy Henyo Intercollegiate Edition Grand Champion by guessing three words in 50.45 seconds.
- June 26: 25-year-old falsetto singer Marcelito Pomoy wins the second season of Pilipinas Got Talent.

=== July ===
- July 3: BEAM Channel 31 (UHF 31) returns as a test broadcast after 8 years of ceased broadcasting.

=== August ===
- August 15: BEAM Channel 31 was now affiliated by Solar Television Network as the 4th free-TV station of the said company, and branded as The Game Channel on August 15, 2011, the first all game show programs on free TV.

=== September ===
- September 12: Shamcey Supsup, Bb. Pilipinas-Universe 2011, was the 3rd Runner-up at Miss Universe 2011 held at São Paulo, Brazil.
- September 18: Karl Jonathan Aguilar wins the top prize winner of 2 Million pesos of Who Wants to Be a Millionaire?.

=== October ===
- October 1: The Ateneo de Manila University Blue Eagles clinched the UAAP Season 74 men's basketball title after defeating the Far Eastern University 2–0 in game 2 of the best-of-three finals series held at the Smart Araneta Coliseum in Quezon City. This was their 4th consecutive basketball championship title and also the championship title won by the season's host for the second time.
- October 6: The Movie and Television Review and Classification Board revised the television rating system in order to exercise caution and vigilance with the viewing habits of the viewers.
- October 8: Larry Martin was hailed as the first Pinoy Biggest Loser, held at the Ynares Sports Arena.
- October 22: Anne Curtis was hailed as Showtime's second anniversary champion.
- October 23: Male singing trio Maasinhon Trio win the third season of Pilipinas Got Talent.

=== November ===
- November 5: ABS-CBN launches the Christmas song Da Best ang Pasko ng Pilipino, after the news program TV Patrol.
- November 6: Gwendoline Ruais, Miss World-Philippines 2011, was the 1st Runner-up at Miss World 2011 held at London, United Kingdom.
- November 7: Dianne Necio, Bb. Pilipinas International 2011, was placed in Top 15 at Miss International 2011 held at Chengdu, China. She even won the Miss Internet Popularity Award.
- November 12: Cubilla Family of Leyte was hailed as Eat Bulaga!'s Pamilyang Pinoy Henyo 2011 Grand Champion by guessing three words in 2 minutes and 46.53 seconds.

=== December ===
- December 3: Athena Mae Imperial, Miss Philippines-Earth 2011, was crowned Miss Water at Miss Earth 2011 held at Quezon City.
- December 10: Astig Pinoy wins as Showtime's fourth grand champion, the grand finals of which were held at Ynares Sports Arena, Antipolo City.
- December 24: BEAM Channel 31 (The Game Channel) its broadcast every morning and afternoon, to give way to its new sister network station CHASE (now CT) every evening block was launched by Solar Entertainment Corporation.

== Premieres ==
Date	Show	Network
January 1	H_{2}O: Just Add Water	Q 11 (now GMA News TV 11)
January 1	Sabado Sineplex	TV5
January 2	ASAP Rocks	ABS-CBN 2
January 3	Malparida	ABS-CBN 2
January 3	Dr. Love Music Show	DZMM TeleRadyo
January 3	The Baker King	GMA 7
January 10	Dwarfina	GMA 7
January 17	Cinderella's Sister	ABS-CBN 2
January 20	American Idol season 10	Q 11 (now GMA News TV 11)
January 21	Tunay na Buhay	GMA 7
January 22	The Screening Room	2nd Avenue
January 22	Wansapanataym Presents: Buhawi Jack	ABS-CBN 2
January 23	Radyo Patrol Balita Linggo	DZMM TeleRadyo
January 24	Alakdana	GMA 7
January 24	Agimat: Ang Mga Alamat ni Ramon Revilla: Bianong Bulag	ABS-CBN 2
January 24	Machete	GMA 7
January 24	Scooby-Doo, Where Are You!	TV5
January 24	Swerte Swerte Lang!	TV5
January 28	Wanted	TV5
January 31	Mutya	ABS-CBN 2
February 7	Babaeng Hampaslupa	TV5
February 7	I Heart You, Pare!	GMA 7
February 7	Agimat: Ang Mga Alamat ni Ramon Revilla: Kapitan Inggo	ABS-CBN 2
February 7	Mismo	DZMM TeleRadyo
February 12	Happy Yipee Yehey!	ABS-CBN 2
February 13	Luv Crazy	TV5
February 14	Autumn's Concerto	ABS-CBN 2
February 14	Green Rose	ABS-CBN 2
February 14	Nita Negrita	GMA 7
February 14	The Price Is Right	ABS-CBN 2
February 18	Pulsong Pinoy	NBN 4 (now PTV 4), RPN 9 and IBC 13
February 21	Andar ng mga Balita on Radio	AksyonTV 41
February 21	Relasyon	AksyonTV 41
February 21	Punto Asintado	AksyonTV 41
February 21	Sapul sa Singko	AksyonTV 41
February 21	Balitaang Tapat	AksyonTV 41
February 21	Aksyon	AksyonTV 41
February 21	Aksyon JournalisMO	AksyonTV 41
February 21	Andar ng mga Balita	AksyonTV 41
February 21	Wanted sa Radyo	AksyonTV 41
February 21	Cristy FerMinute	AksyonTV 41
February 21	Duelo	AksyonTV 41
February 21	Totoo TV	AksyonTV 41
February 21	Precious Hearts Romances Presents: Mana Po	ABS-CBN 2
February 21	True Beauty	ETC
February 21	Saksi (2nd incarnation)	GMA 7
February 22	Journo	AksyonTV 41
February 23	Dokumentado	AksyonTV 41
February 24	Public Atorni: Asunto o Areglo	AksyonTV 41
February 25	Wanted	AksyonTV 41
February 26	Balita Alas-Singko	AksyonTV 41
February 26	Healing Galing	AksyonTV 41
February 26	Alagang Kapatid	AksyonTV 41
February 26	Metro Sabado	AksyonTV 41
February 26	Oplan Asenso	AksyonTV 41
February 26	Love Idols	AksyonTV 41
February 26	Ako Mismo	AksyonTV 41
February 26	Teknotrip	AksyonTV 41
February 26	Tutok Tulfo	AksyonTV 41
February 26	Aksyon Sabado	AksyonTV 41
February 27	Fan*tastik	TV5
February 27	Lucky Numbers	TV5
February 27	Pinoy Samurai	TV5
February 27	Chink Positive	AksyonTV 41
February 27	Perfect Morning	AksyonTV 41
February 27	Astig	AksyonTV 41
February 27	Iba 'Yung Pinoy	AksyonTV 41
February 27	USI: Under Special Investigation	AksyonTV 41
February 27	Kasindak-Sindak	AksyonTV 41
February 27	Aksyon Linggo	AksyonTV 41
February 27	Alertado	AksyonTV 41
February 28	Brigada	GMA News TV 11
February 28	iJuander	GMA News TV 11
February 28	Tweetbiz Insiders	GMA News TV 11
February 28	In the Limelight	GMA News TV 11
February 28	Dobol B sa News TV	GMA News TV 11
February 28	My Lover, My Wife	GMA 7
February 28	Magic Palayok	GMA 7
February 28	News to Go	GMA News TV 11
February 28	News Live	GMA News TV 11
February 28	On Call: Serbisyong Totoo. Ngayon.	GMA News TV 11
February 28	CNN Konek	AksyonTV 41
February 28	Bilis Balita	Studio 23
February 28	Adyenda	GMA News TV 11
February 28	Dream Home	GMA News TV 11
February 28	State of the Nation	GMA News TV 11
March 1	Best Men	GMA News TV 11
March 1	Midnight Prayer Helps	GMA News TV 11
March 1	Pop Talk	GMA News TV 11
March 2	Bawal ang Pasaway kay Mareng Winnie	GMA News TV 11
March 2	PJM Forum	GMA News TV 11
March 2	Fashbook	GMA News TV 11
March 2	Extra	ETC
March 3	Investigative Documentaries	GMA News TV 11
March 3	America's Next Top Model cycle 16	ETC
March 4	May Tamang Balita	GMA News TV 11
March 5	Balita Pilipinas	GMA News TV 11
March 5	Front Row	GMA News TV 11
March 5	Jesus the Healer	GMA News TV 11
March 5	Diyos at Bayan	GMA News TV 11
March 5	The Smiths	GMA News TV 11
March 5	Weekend Getaway	GMA News TV 11
March 6	Game!	GMA News TV 11
March 6	GMA News TV All Sports	GMA News TV 11
March 6	Good News Kasama si Vicky Morales	GMA News TV 11
March 6	Reel Time	GMA News TV 11
March 7	Dragon Ball Z Kai	GMA 7
March 7	Dooley and Pals	Light TV 33
March 7	Auto-B-Good	Light TV 33
March 7	Iba-Balita Ngayon	Studio 23
March 7	Minsan Lang Kita Iibigin	ABS-CBN 2
March 14	Kapamilya Blockbusters (weekday edition)	ABS-CBN 2
March 16	9 by Design	2nd Avenue
March 18	House of Glam	ETC
March 21	Hitman Reborn! season 4	ABS-CBN 2
March 21	Mga Nagbabagang Bulaklak	TV5
March 21	My Princess	ABS-CBN 2
March 26	Man vs. Beast	GMA 7
March 26	Spooky Nights: Bampirella	GMA 7
March 27	The Sharon Cuneta Specials	ABS-CBN 2
March 28	Captain Barbell	GMA 7
March 28	Mula sa Puso	ABS-CBN 2
April 2	Why Not?	ABS-CBN 2
April 3	Good Vibes	ABS-CBN 2
April 4	Family Feud: The Showdown Edition	GMA 7
April 4	Summer Super Sine	TV5
April 4	Frijolito	ABS-CBN 2
April 4	Kitchen Superstar	GMA 7
April 4	Star Box	GMA 7
April 11	Primetime Super Sine	TV5
April 11	Wow Mali (3rd incarnation)	TV5
April 16	Amazing Cooking Kids	GMA 7
April 17	Power Rangers Jungle Fury (rerun)	ABS-CBN 2
April 30	Mind Master (season 1)	GMA 7
April 30	Spooky Nights: The Ringtone	GMA 7
April 30	Tropang Potchi	GMA 7
May 1	World Premiere	GMA News TV 11
May 2	I Am Legend	ABS-CBN 2
May 2	Secret Garden	GMA 7
May 2	News Light	Light TV 33
May 6	Lokomoko (2nd incarnation)	TV5
May 7	Quickfire	GMA News TV 11
May 9	100 Days to Heaven	ABS-CBN 2
May 9	Munting Heredera	GMA 7
May 9	My Girlfriend is a Gumiho	ABS-CBN 2
May 9	Price Watch	GMA 7
May 12	Del Monte Kitchenomics	GMA News TV 11
May 14	My Chubby World	GMA 7
May 14	Wil Time Bigtime	TV5
May 15	Bagets: Just Got Lucky	TV5
May 15	Magic? Bagsik!	TV5
May 16	Blusang Itim	GMA 7
May 21	Sabadabadog	GMA 7
May 22	Gandang Gabi, Vice!	ABS-CBN 2
May 23	Slam Dunk (rerun)	GMA 7
May 23	On Call: Serbisyong Totoo. Ngayon.	GMA News TV 11
May 24	Iskul Bukol	TV5
May 28	Andres de Saya	GMA 7
May 28	Dog TV	GMA News TV 11
May 29	Sunday Sineplex	TV5
May 30	Amaya	GMA 7
May 30	The Biggest Loser Pinoy Edition	ABS-CBN 2
May 30	Playful Kiss	GMA 7
May 30	Sisid	GMA 7
June 4	R.U. Kidding Me	TV5
June 4	Spooky Nights: Snow White Lady and the Seven Ghosts	GMA 7
June 4	Sugo Mga Kapatid!	TV5
June 5	Armor of God	GMA News TV 11
June 6	Guns and Roses	ABS-CBN 2
June 6	Mickey Mouse Clubhouse	TV5
June 6	Super Sine 5	TV5
June 6	Temptation of Wife: By Popular Demand	GMA 7
June 11	Hamtaro	GMA 7
June 11	Master Hamsters	GMA 7
June 12	I-Shine Talent Camp TV	GMA 7
June 13	Sinner or Saint	GMA 7
June 13	Kourtney and Kim Take Miami	ETC
June 13	The Glee Project	ETC/Jack TV
June 18	Hey, It's Saberdey!	TV5
June 19	Hamon ng Pagbabago	TV5
June 20	Marry Me, Mary!	ABS-CBN 2
June 27	Kris TV	ABS-CBN 2
July 2	Spooky Nights: Nuno sa Feng Shui	GMA 7
July 3	Idol sa Kusina	GMA News TV 11
July 4	Kapuso Movie Festival (weekday edition)	GMA 7
July 4	Futbolilits	GMA 7
July 4	Carlo J. Caparas' Bangis	TV5
July 5	Marcel's Quantum Kitchen	2nd Avenue
July 5	Love Bites	2nd Avenue
July 9	Follow That Star	GMA News TV 11
July 9	Banana Split Extra Scoop	ABS-CBN 2
July 11	Balita Pilipinas Ngayon	GMA News TV 11
July 11	I Dare You (season 1)	ABS-CBN 2
July 11	Pure Love	ABS-CBN 2
July 11	Reputasyon	ABS-CBN 2
July 15	Motorcycle Diaries	GMA News TV 11
July 16	Manny Many Prizes	GMA 7
July 17	Jollitown (season 4)	ABS-CBN 2
July 18	Gourmet	GMA 7
July 18	Rod Santiago's The Sisters	TV5
July 19	Nikita	ETC
July 23	Mistaken Identity	GMA 7
July 24	Mind Master (season 2)	GMA 7
July 25	Personalan	GMA News TV 11
July 25	Win Mo, Kapuso!	GMA 7
July 30	MEGA Fashion Crew	ETC
August 1	News TV Quick Response Team	GMA News TV 11
August 1	Time of My Life	GMA 7
August 7	Kerygma TV	IBC 13
August 7	Foster's Home for Imaginary Friends	TV5
August 7	The Secret Saturdays	TV5
August 8	Big Thing	GMA 7
August 8	News Team 13	IBC 13
August 8	The Fierce Wife	ABS-CBN 2
August 8	Mondo Manu	AksyonTV 41
August 8	Failon Ngayon sa DZMM	DZMM TeleRadyo
August 14	Campus Challenge	UNTV 37
August 15	America's Got Talent	TGC
August 15	Jeopardy!	TGC
August 15	Minute to Win It	TGC
August 15	Wheel of Fortune	TGC
August 15	Sinetanghali	TV5
August 15	Pahiram ng Isang Ina	GMA 7
August 15	Maria la del Barrio	ABS-CBN 2
August 22	TV Patrol Panay	ABS-CBN TV-10 Iloilo
August 22	My Binondo Girl	ABS-CBN 2
August 27	Junior MasterChef Pinoy Edition	ABS-CBN 2
August 29	Iglot	GMA 7
September 3	Kapuso Movie Festival (Saturday edition)	GMA 7
September 3	Spooky Nights: Ang Munting Mahadera	GMA 7
September 4	Growing Up	ABS-CBN 2
September 4	Protégé: The Battle for the Big Break	GMA 7
September 4	ASOP Music Festival	UNTV 37
September 5	Kumare Klub	TV5
September 5	T3: Kapatid, Sagot Kita!	TV5
September 5	XXX: Exklusibong, Explosibong, Exposé	DZMM TeleRadyo
September 5	Inside Protege	GMA 7
September 6	Patrol ng Pilipino	DZMM TeleRadyo
September 7	Storyline	DZMM TeleRadyo
September 7	Anggulo	TV5/AksyonTV 41
September 8	Krusada	DZMM TeleRadyo
September 9	S.O.C.O.: Scene of the Crime Operatives	DZMM TeleRadyo
September 10	Balita Pilipinas Primetime	GMA News TV 11
September 10	Buhay OFW	AksyonTV 41
September 12	Nasaan Ka, Elisa?	ABS-CBN 2
September 12	Ang Utol Kong Hoodlum	TV5
September 18	Pinoy Explorer	TV5
September 18	TV5 Kids presents Disney Movie	TV5
September 19	Kung Aagawin Mo ang Langit	GMA 7
September 19	America's Next Top Model cycle 17	ETC
September 19	Eyeshield 21 (season 3)	ABS-CBN 2
September 19	My Fair Lady	ABS-CBN 2
September 19	Banana Split: Lafternoon Delight	ABS-CBN 2
September 20	The Secret Circle	ETC
September 22	The X Factor season 1	Studio 23
September 25	The Playboy Club	2nd Avenue
September 29	Hart of Dixie	2nd Avenue
October 2	PBA on AKTV	IBC 13
October 2	AKTV Center	IBC 13
October 2	Celebrity Samurai	TV5
October 3	Sa Ngalan ng Ina	TV5
October 3	Three Brothers	ABS-CBN 2
October 7	New Girl	ETC
October 8	Ako Ang Simula	ABS-CBN 2
October 9	Ako Ang Simula	ANC
October 9	Tom and Jerry Tales	GMA 7
October 10	Ikaw Lang ang Mamahalin	GMA 7
October 10	Cinderella Man	GMA 7
October 10	Budoy	ABS-CBN 2
October 10	Kapamilya Blockbusters (weekday edition)	ABS-CBN 2
October 10	Showbiz Exclusives	GMA News TV 11
October 12	Ako Ang Simula	DZMM TeleRadyo
October 14	Bitag	TV5
October 16	Hannah Montana	TV5
October 16	The Suite Life of Zack & Cody	TV5
October 16	Iron Man	ABS-CBN 2
October 17	Daldalita	GMA 7
October 17	Without a Trace season 1	Fox Channel Philippines
October 22	Turbo Zone	GMA News TV 11
October 23	Etcetera	ETC
October 23	Sanib Puwersa	GMA 7
October 24	Gellicious	TV5
October 24	Pambansang Almusal	Net 25
October 24	Mata ng Agila	Net 25
October 24	Eagle News International	Net 25
October 24	Eagle News Update	Net 25
October 29	Pinoy Big Brother: Unlimited	ABS-CBN 2
October 31	Pinoy Big Brother UnliDay	ABS-CBN 2
October 31	Pinoy Big Brother UnliNight	ABS-CBN 2
October 31	Fairy Tail season 1	GMA 7
November 5	Real Confessions	TV5
November 5	Regal Shocker	TV5
November 5	The Jose and Wally Show Starring Vic Sotto	TV5
November 5	Toda Max	ABS-CBN 2
November 5	Just for Laughs Gags	GMA 7
November 7	Glamorosa	TV5
November 7	Responde	Net 25
November 14	Kokak	GMA 7
November 14	Survivor Philippines: Celebrity Doubles Showdown	GMA 7
November 14	Inazuma Eleven	ABS-CBN 2
November 14	Angelito: Batang Ama	ABS-CBN 2
November 14	Helena's Promise	ABS-CBN 2
November 14	In the Name of Love	Telenovela Channel
November 14	La Madrastra	Telenovela Channel
November 14	The Two Sides of Ana	Telenovela Channel
November 16	Pasion	Telenovela Channel
November 17	Without a Trace season 2	Fox Channel Philippines
November 18	Friends with Benefits	ETC
November 21	Ikaw ay Pag-Ibig	ABS-CBN 2
November 21	P. S. I Love You	TV5
November 23	2 Broke Girls	ETC
November 28	Love You	GMA 7
November 28	Dong Yi	GMA 7
December 2	Crime Klasik	AksyonTV 41
December 21	Without a Trace season 3	Fox Channel Philippines

=== Unknown ===
- February: RX: Nutrisyon at Kalusugan on IBC 13
- December: Maunlad na Agrikultura on TV5/AksyonTV 41

=== Unknown ===
- MMDA Metro Traffic Live on DZMM TeleRadyo
- Katok sa Kusina on TV5
- Health Med on IBC 13
- I Love Pinas on GMA News TV 11
- Nancy Lumen: The Pinoy Foodie on GMA News TV 11
- Remix Report on GMA News TV 11
- FNRI Puppet Videos on IBC 13
- It's My Life with Troy Montero on IBC 13
- Gintong Uhay on IBC 13
- Cooltura on IBC 13
- Bigtime Bakbakan on IBC 13
- Fight Sports BWF on IBC 13
- Fight Sports Greatest Classics on IBC 13
- Fight Sports Knockouts on IBC 13
- Fight Sports Wide World of Fights on IBC 13
- Fight Sports World Championship Kick Boxing on IBC 13
- Fight Quest on IBC 13
- Knockout Sportsworld on IBC 13
- Pacific Xtreme Combat on IBC 13
- Beautiful Batangas on NBN 4
- Independent Music Hub on NBN 4
- Kita Mo Na, Galing ng Pinoy on NBN 4
- Music Link on NBN 4
- Pinoy T.A.L.K. (Travel, Adventure, Leisure, Knowledge) on PTV 4
- Pulis Ako, Pulis Nyo Po on PTV 4
- Sambuhay TV Mass on NBN 4
- Saving ASEAN Natural Treasures on PTV 4
- Sining Gising: NCCA Ugnayan sa Tinig ng Bayan on NBN 4
- Talking Points: Ang Tinig ng Serbisyo Publiko on PTV 4
- ETC Vibe on ETC
- ETC Watchlist on ETC
- Cook Eat Right on UNTV 37
- Klasrum on UNTV 37
- Police and Other Matters on UNTV 37
- QUAT: Quick Action Team on UNTV 37
- 8 Kingdom on TV5
- Cheer up on Love on TV5
- Generator Rex on TV5
- Good Wife, Bad Wife on TV5
- My Wife is a Superwoman on TV5
- Powerpuff Girls Z on TV5
- Teen Titans on TV5
- What's for Dinner? on TV5
- El Tigre: The Adventures of Manny Rivera on ABS-CBN 2
- The Avengers: Earth's Mightiest Heroes on ABS-CBN 2
- The Penguins of Madagascar on ABS-CBN 2
- Akazukin Chacha on Studio 23
- Ani-Yoko on Studio 23
- Chu, Chu, My Daddy on Studio 23
- Cuore on Studio 23
- Dream on Studio 23
- Fairy Tale Police Department on Studio 23
- He's Beautiful on Studio 23
- Hot Shot on Studio 23
- Huntik: Secrets & Seekers on Studio 23
- Kiba on Studio 23
- Little Women on Studio 23
- Nitro Circus on Studio 23
- Peter Pan and Wendy on Studio 23
- Princess Resurrection on Studio 23
- Summer x Summer on Studio 23
- The Adventures of Huck Finn on Studio 23
- The X-Family on Studio 23
- You're Under Arrest on Studio 23
- Buhay Pinoy on Light TV 33
- Gabay at Aksyon on Light TV 33
- God is at Work on Light TV 33
- Health is Wealth on Light TV 33
- I Love Pinas on Light TV 33
- Inter-Mission on Light TV 33
- Light Up on Light TV 33
- Lingkod Bayan with Tony Falcon on Light TV 33
- Pilipinas Pinagpala Ka Hallelujah Talaga! on Light TV 33
- Postcards on Light TV 33
- Real Lives, Real People on Light TV 33
- Sarap Pinoy on Light TV 33
- The 700 Club Asia on Light TV 33
- Bangon Balita on RHTV
- Bayan Kontra Smuggling on RHTV
- Doc Willie and Liza Live on RHTV
- DZRH Balita Alas-Kwatro on RHTV
- DZRH Hataw on RHTV
- DZRH Love Chat on RHTV
- Magandang Umaga Pilipinas on RHTV
- Maynila, ito ang Pilipinas on RHTV
- Parada Balita Linggo on RHTV
- Radyo Harana on RHTV
- RH Balita @ 6 pm on RHTV
- RH Balita @ 9 pm on RHTV
- Sagot sa Bayan on RHTV
- SOS: Special on Saturday on RHTV
- Sonny in the Morning with Kisses on RHTV
- Usapang Batas on RHTV
- Usapang Maritime on RHTV

== Returning or renamed programs ==
Show	Last aired	Retitled as/Season/Notes	Channel	Return date
ASAP XV	2010	ASAP Rocks	ABS-CBN	January 2
American Idol	2010	Same (season 10)	Q (now GMA News TV)	January 20
Rx Men	2008 (Q)	RX: Nutrisyon at Kalusugan	IBC	February
Showbiz Mismo	2011	Mismo	DZMM TeleRadyo	February 7
The Price is Right	2003 (ABC)	Same	ABS-CBN	February 14
Green Rose	2005	Same (Philippine adaptation)	ABS-CBN	February 14
Philippine Basketball Association	2011 (Solar TV / Basketball TV; season 36: "Philippine Cup")	Same (season 36: "Commissioner's Cup")	Studio 23 / Basketball TV	February 18
Cristy Per Minute	2000 (ABS-CBN)	Cristy FerMinute	AksyonTV	February 21
Saksi: Liga ng Katotohanan	2011	Saksi (2nd incarnation)	GMA	February 21
Brigada Siete	2001 (GMA)	Brigada	GMA News TV	February 28
Tweetbiz: The Bizniz of Chizmiz	2011 (Q)	Tweetbiz Insiders	GMA News TV	February 28
America's Next Top Model	2010	Same (cycle 16)	ETC	March 3
Hitman Reborn!	2010	Same (season 4)	ABS-CBN	March 21
Mula sa Puso	1999	Same (2011)	ABS-CBN	March 28
Captain Barbell	2007	Same (2011)	GMA	March 28
Shakey's V-League	2010 (season 7: "2nd Conference")	Same (season 8: "1st Conference")	NBN	April 3
Family Feud	2010 (2nd incarnation; season 2)	Same (2nd incarnation; season 3: "The Showdown Edition")	GMA	April 4
Wow Meganon	2011	Wow Mali (3rd incarnation)	TV5	April 11
Tropang Potchi	2011 (Q)	Same	GMA	April 30
Lokomoko U	2011	Lokomoko (2nd incarnation)	TV5	May 6
Del Monte Kitchenomics	2004 (ABS-CBN)	Same	GMA News TV	May 12
Iskul Bukol	1988 (IBC)	Same (remake)	TV5	May 24
Philippine Basketball Association	2011 (season 36: "Commissioner's Cup")	Same (season 36: "Governors' Cup")	Studio 23 / Basketball TV	June 11
National Collegiate Athletic Association	2011	Same (season 87)	Studio 23	July 2
University Athletic Association of the Philippines	2011	Same (season 74)	Studio 23	July 9
Jollitown	2010 (GMA)	Same (season 4)	ABS-CBN	July 17
Mind Master	2011	Same (season 2)	GMA	July 24
Shakey's V-League	2011 (season 8: "1st Conference")	Same (season 8: "Open Conference")	NBN	July 31
Kerygma TV	2010 (TV5)	Same	IBC	August 7
Tambalang Failon at Webb	2011	Failon Ngayon sa DZMM	DZMM TeleRadyo	August 8
María la del Barrio	1997 (RPN) / 2003 (GMA)	Same (Philippine adaptation)	ABS-CBN	August 15
Growing Up	1999 (GMA)	Same (2011)	ABS-CBN	September 4
America's Next Top Model	2011	Same (cycle 17)	ETC	September 19
Philippine Basketball Association	2011 (Studio 23 / Basketball TV; season 36: "Governors' Cup")	Same (season 37: "Philippine Cup")	AKTV on IBC	October 2
Palawan TV Patrol	2006	TV Patrol Palawan	ABS-CBN Palawan	October 7
Ikaw Lang ang Mamahalin	2002	Same (2011)	GMA	October 10
Shakey's V-League	2011 (season 8: "Open Conference")	Same (season 8: "SEA Club Invitational")	NBN	October 27
Pinoy Big Brother	2010 (season 3: "Double Up")	Same (season 4: "Unlimited")	ABS-CBN	October 29
Pinoy Big Brother	2010 (season 3: "Double Up Uber")	Same (season 4: "Unliday")	ABS-CBN	October 31
Pinoy Big Brother	2010 (season 3: "Double Up Late")	Same (season 4: "Unlinight")	ABS-CBN	October 31
Regal Shocker	1988 (GMA) / 1991 (Islands TV 13)	Same (remake)	TV5	November 5
Survivor Philippines	2010 (season 3: "Celebrity Showdown")	Same (season 4: "Celebrity Doubles Showdown")	GMA	November 14
National Basketball Association	2011	Same (2011–12 season)	ABS-CBN / Studio 23 / Basketball TV / NBA Premium TV	December 26
Bagong Maunlad na Agrikultura	2011 (IBC)	Maunlad na Agrikultura	TV5 / AksyonTV	December
Magandang Umaga Pilipinas	2007 (ABS-CBN)	Same (2nd incarnation)	RHTV	Unknown
Radyo Hataw	2011	DZRH Hataw	RHTV	Unknown

== Programs transferring networks ==
Date	Show	No. of seasons	Moved from	Moved to
February	Rx Men	—N/a	Q (now GMA News TV)	IBC (as RX: Nutrisyon at Kalusugan)
February 14	The Price is Right	—N/a	ABC (now TV5)	ABS-CBN
February 19	National Basketball Association	65	Solar TV (now Talk TV)	ABS-CBN / Studio 23
February 21	Cristy Per Minute	—N/a	ABS-CBN	AksyonTV (as Cristy FerMinute)
February 28	Brigada Siete	—N/a	GMA	GMA News TV (as Brigada)
February 28	Balitanghali	—N/a	Q (now GMA News TV)	GMA News TV
March 2	The Insider	—N/a	Solar TV (now Talk TV) / 2nd Avenue	ETC
March 2	The Today Show	—N/a	2nd Avenue	Talk TV
March 2	Inside Edition	—N/a	ETC	Talk TV / 2nd Avenue
March 5	Day Off	—N/a	Q (now GMA News TV)	GMA News TV
March 6	Ang Pinaka	—N/a	Q (now GMA News TV)	GMA News TV
April 30	Tropang Potchi	—N/a	Q (now GMA News TV)	GMA
May 12	Del Monte Kitchenomics	—N/a	ABS-CBN	GMA News TV
May 24	Iskul Bukol	—N/a	IBC	TV5
July 17	Jollitown	4	GMA	ABS-CBN
August 7	Kerygma TV	—N/a	TV5	IBC
September 4	Growing Up	—N/a	GMA	ABS-CBN (as a remake)
October 2	Philippine Basketball Association	37	Solar TV (now Talk TV) / Basketball TV	AKTV on IBC
October 6	How I Met Your Mother	—N/a	ETC	2nd Avenue
October 14	Bitag	—N/a	IBC	TV5
November 5	Just for Laughs Gags	—N/a	RPN (now Talk TV) / Jack TV / Q (now GMA News TV)	GMA
November 5	Regal Shocker	—N/a	GMA / Islands TV 13 (now IBC)	TV5
December	Bagong Maunlad na Agrikultura	—N/a	IBC	TV5 / AksyonTV (as Maunlad na Agrikultura)
Unknown	Magandang Umaga Pilipinas	—N/a	ABS-CBN	RHTV

== Finales ==
- January 7:
  - Grazilda (GMA 7)
  - Perfect Match (ABS-CBN 2)
- January 14: OFW Diaries (GMA 7)
- January 15:
  - 3rd Row (2nd Avenue)
  - Hayate the Combat Butler (Q 11)
- January 17: Inday Wanda (TV5)
- January 21:
  - Ang Yaman ni Lola (GMA 7)
  - Jillian: Namamasko Po (GMA 7)
  - Chowder (TV5)
- January 23: True Stories (Q 11)
- February 4:
  - My Driver Sweet Lover (TV5)
  - Beauty Queen (GMA 7)
  - Noah (ABS-CBN 2)
  - Agimat: Ang Mga Alamat ni Ramon Revilla: Bianong Bulag (ABS-CBN 2)
  - Showbiz Mismo (DZMM TeleRadyo)
- February 11:
  - Precious Hearts Romances Presents: Martha Cecilia's Kristine (ABS-CBN 2)
  - Little Star (GMA 7)
  - Shoutout! (ABS-CBN 2)
  - Precious Hearts Romances Presents: Alyna (ABS-CBN 2)
  - Kapamilya Blockbusters (weekday edition) (ABS-CBN 2)
- February 14: The Beat (Q 11)
- February 15:
  - Midnight Prayer Helps (Q 11)
  - Tara Let Eat! (Q 11)
- February 16:
  - PJM Forum (Q 11)
  - X-Life (Q 11)
- February 17: Sus Naman! (Q 11)
- February 18:
  - The Sweet Life (Q 11)
  - News on Q (Q 11)
  - Tweetbiz: The Bizniz of Chizmiz (Q 11)
  - Adyenda (Q 11)
  - BalikBayan (Q 11)
  - Dragon Ball (Q 11)
  - Endless Love: Autumn in My Heart (Q 11)
  - Hayop Atbp. (Q 11)
  - Land of Winds (Q 11)
  - Legal Forum (Q 11)
  - Maid Sama! (Q 11)
  - Mr. and Ms. Spells (Q 11)
  - On Air (Q 11)
  - Yu-Gi-Oh! Duel Monsters (Q 11)
  - Juanita Banana (ABS-CBN 2)
  - Saksi: Liga ng Katotohanan (GMA 7)
- February 19:
  - Armod of God (Q 11)
  - Diyos at Bayan (Q 11)
  - Tropang Potchi (Q 11)
  - I Laugh Sabado (Q 11)
  - Life's Funniest Moments (Q 11)
  - My Husband's Woman (Q 11)
  - Pinoy Silven Screen (Q 11)
  - Q Drama Classics (Q 11)
  - Sassy Girl Chun-hyang (Q 11)
  - The Front Act Show (SOLARtv on RPN 9)
- February 20:
  - Delicioso (Q 11)
  - Go Negosyo Kaya Mo (Q 11)
  - Jesus the Healer (Q 11)
  - Live on Q (Q 11)
  - Last Romance (Q 11)
  - My Favorite Recipes (Q 11)
  - Philippine Explorer (Q 11)
  - Pinoy Cine Klasika (Q 11)
  - Power Review (Q 11)
  - Quickfire (Q 11)
  - Rated: Chick Flicks (Q 11)
  - Reunions (Q 11)
  - Sarap at Home (Q 11)
  - Sunday Movie Mania (Q 11)
  - House or Not (TV5)
  - P.O.5 (TV5)
- February 25:
  - Solar's Big Ticket (Solar TV 9)
  - RPN NewsWatch Update (Solar TV 9)
  - Koreana (GMA 7)
  - Bantatay (GMA 7)
- February 28:
  - RadioVizion 33 (ZOE TV 33)
  - Winner TV Shopping (ZOE TV 33)
  - ZTV NewsBreak (ZOE TV 33)
- March 1: E! News (ETC)
- March 4:
  - Love ni Mister, Love ni Misis (GMA 7)
  - Power Rangers Jungle Fury (Studio 23)
- March 11: Sabel (ABS-CBN 2)
- March 18:
  - Ako Mismo (TV5)
  - Agimat: Ang Mga Alamat ni Ramon Revilla: Kapitan Inggo (ABS-CBN 2)
  - Machete (GMA 7)
- March 19: Ako Mismo (AksyonTV 41)
- March 25:
  - Cinderella's Sister (ABS-CBN 2)
  - Malparida (ABS-CBN 2)
- March 27: Your Song (ABS-CBN 2)
- April 1:
  - All Aboard, Pinoy Abroad (DZMM TeleRadyo)
  - Bandila (DZMM TeleRadyo)
  - Precious Hearts Romances Presents: Mana Po (ABS-CBN 2)
  - Kapuso Movie Festival (weekday edition) (GMA 7)
- April 8:
  - Wow Meganon (TV5)
  - Willing Willie (TV5)
  - The Wrap (Studio 23)
- April 9: Kapuso Movie Festival (Saturday edition) (GMA 7)
- April 10: Metal Fight Beyblade (ABS-CBN 2)
- April 16:
  - Man vs. Beast (GMA 7)
  - Spooky Nights: Bampirella (GMA 7)
- April 17: News and Views with Abel Cruz (IBC 13)
- April 29:
  - The Baker King (GMA 7)
  - Imortal (ABS-CBN 2)
  - Lokomoko U (TV5)
- May 6:
  - My Princess (ABS-CBN 2)
  - Dwarfina (GMA 7)
  - Mutya (ABS-CBN 2)
- May 8:
  - Luv Crazy (TV5)
  - My Darling Aswang (TV5)
- May 13:
  - Star Box (GMA 7)
  - Alakdana (GMA 7)
  - Primetime Super Sine (TV5)
- May 14:
  - Art Angel (GMA 7)
  - Midnight DJ (TV5)
- May 17: Hap-ier Together (TV5)
- May 20:
  - Signs and Wonders (IBC 13)
  - Dragon Ball Z Kai (GMA 7)
  - On Call: Serbisyong Totoo. Ngayon. (GMA News TV 11)
- May 21:
  - Spooky Nights: The Ringtone (GMA 7)
  - Mind Master (season 1) (GMA 7)
- May 22: Fan*tastik (TV5)
- May 26:
  - American Idol (season 10) (GMA News TV 11)
  - America's Next Top Model (cycle 16) (ETC)
- May 27:
  - My Lover, My Wife (GMA 7)
  - Temptation of Wife (GMA 7)
  - I Heart You, Pare! (GMA 7)
  - Green Rose (ABS-CBN 2)
- May 28: LOL: Laugh or Lose (TV5)
- June 1: Up Close and Personal with Marissa del Mar (IBC 13)
- June 2: Extra Express (IBC 13)
- June 3:
  - Tweetbiz Insiders (GMA News TV 11)
  - Mara Clara (ABS-CBN 2)
  - Special Agent Oso (TV5)
  - Summer Super Sine (TV5)
- June 10: Nita Negrita (GMA 7)
- June 17:
  - Mga Nagbabagang Bulaklak (TV5)
  - My Girlfriend Is a Gumiho (ABS-CBN 2)
- June 18: Laugh Out Loud (ABS-CBN 2)
- June 24: Hitman Reborn! season 4 (ABS-CBN 2)
- June 25: Spooky Nights: Snow White Lady and the Seven Ghosts (GMA 7)
- June 26: Pilipinas Got Talent (season 2) (ABS-CBN 2)
- July 1:
  - Family Feud: The Showdown Edition (GMA 7)
  - Kitchen Superstar (GMA 7)
  - Magic Palayok (GMA 7)
- July 2: Banana Split (ABS-CBN 2)
- July 8: I Am Legend (ABS-CBN 2)
- July 9:
  - Misteryo (GMA 7)
  - Spooky Nights: Nuno sa Feng Shui (GMA 7)
- July 10: Show Me Da Manny (GMA 7)
- July 15:
  - Babaeng Hampaslupa (TV5)
  - Playful Kiss (GMA 7)
- July 16: Amazing Cooking Kids (GMA 7)
- July 17: Mel & Joey (GMA 7)
- July 22:
  - Frijolito (ABS-CBN 2)
  - Trip na Trip (ABS-CBN 2)
- July 29: Captain Barbell (GMA 7)
- July 30: Bob the Builder (TV5)
- July 31: I-Shine Talent Camp TV (GMA 7)
- August 5:
  - Tambalang Failon at Webb (DZMM TeleRadyo)
  - IBC Headliners (IBC 13)
  - Express Balita (IBC 13)
  - IBC News Tonight (IBC 13)
  - Marry Me, Mary! (ABS-CBN 2)
  - Secret Garden (GMA 7)
- August 6: Dexter’s Laboratory (TV5)
- August 12:
  - Blusang Itim (GMA 7)
  - Mula sa Puso (ABS-CBN 2)
  - Good Wife, Bad Wife (TV5)
- August 13: The Price Is Right (ABS-CBN 2)
- August 19:
  - TV Patrol Iloilo (ABS-CBN TV-10 Iloilo)
  - Minsan Lang Kita Iibigin (ABS-CBN 2)
- August 21: Andres de Saya (GMA 7)
- August 25: Temptation of Wife: By Popular Demand (GMA 7)
- August 27: Mistaken Identity (GMA 7)
- August 28:
  - Good Vibes (ABS-CBN 2)
  - Mind Master (season 2) (GMA 7)
- August 31: Dokumentado (TV5/AksyonTV 41)
- September 2: Music Uplate Live (ABS-CBN 2)
- September 3: Balita Pilipinas (GMA News TV 11)
- September 9:
  - SNN: Showbiz News Ngayon (ABS-CBN 2)
  - Rod Santiago's The Sisters (TV5)
- September 10: Spooky Nights: Ang Munting Mahadera (GMA 7)
- September 16:
  - Sisid (GMA 7)
  - Banana Split: Daily Servings (ABS-CBN 2)
  - Kapamilya Blockbusters (weekday edition) (ABS-CBN 2)
- September 17:
  - Autumn's Concerto (ABS-CBN 2)
  - ABS-CBN News & Current Affairs Special Report (ABS-CBN 2)
- September 23: Guns and Roses (ABS-CBN 2)
- September 25: Pinoy Samurai (TV5)
- September 27: Iskul Bukol (TV5)
- September 30:
  - Carlo J. Caparas' Bangis (TV5)
  - The Fierce Wife (ABS-CBN 2)
- October 2: Hamon ng Pagbabago (TV5)
- October 5: Storyline (DZMM TeleRadyo)
- October 7:
  - Banana Split: Lafternoon Delight (ABS-CBN 2)
  - Totoo TV (TV5/AksyonTV 41)
  - Sinner or Saint (GMA 7)
  - Gourmet (GMA 7)
  - In the Limelight (GMA News TV 11)
  - Bitag (IBC 13)
  - The Rundown (ANC)
- October 8: The Biggest Loser Pinoy Edition season 1 (ABS-CBN 2)
- October 9:
  - Jollitown (season 4) (ABS-CBN 2)
  - TV5 Kids presents Disney Movie (TV5)
- October 14: Futbolilits (GMA 7)
- October 21:
  - I Dare You (season 1) (ABS-CBN 2)
  - i-Balita (Net 25)
  - i-News (Net 25)
- October 23:
  - Pilipinas Got Talent (season 3) (ABS-CBN 2)
  - i-Balita Update (Net 25)
  - i-Balita Weekend Report (Net 25)
- October 28: Pure Love (ABS-CBN 2)
- October 29
  - R.U. Kidding Me (TV5)
  - Talentadong Pinoy (TV5)
  - Sugo Mga Kapatid! (TV5)
- November 4: Sa Ngalan ng Ina (TV5)
- November 6: Anatomy of a Disaster (GMA 7)
- November 11:
  - Pahiram ng Isang Ina (GMA 7)
  - Iglot (GMA 7)
  - Eyeshield 21 (season 3) (ABS-CBN 2)
  - My Fair Lady (ABS-CBN 2)
  - The Avengers: Earth's Mightiest Heroes (ABS-CBN 2)
- November 13: Sanib Puwersa (GMA 7)
- November 16: Without a Trace (season 1) (Fox Channel Philippines)
- November 18:
  - 100 Days to Heaven (ABS-CBN 2)
  - Ang Utol Kong Hoodlum (TV5)
  - Time of My Life (GMA 7)
- November 19: Sabadabadog! (GMA 7)
- November 24: Big Thing (GMA 7)
- November 25: Cinderella Man (GMA 7)
- November 26:
  - Yo Gabba Gabba! (TV5)
  - Hi-5 series 11 (TV5)
  - Chuggington (TV5)
  - Lupet (TV5)
  - Hanep Buhay (GMA 7)
- December 12: America's Next Top Model cycle 17 (ETC)
- December 16: Inside Protege (GMA 7)
- December 18: Protégé: The Battle for the Big Break (GMA 7)
- December 20: Without a Trace season 2 (Fox Channel Philippines)
- December 30: Helena's Promise (ABS-CBN 2)

=== Stopped airing ===
- September 24 and October 1: (Reason: pre-empted by UAAP Season 74 Men's Basketball Finals: Ateneo vs. FEU Game 1 and UAAP Season 74 Men's Basketball Finals: Ateneo vs. FEU Game 2)
  - Entertainment Live (ABS-CBN 2)
  - Failon Ngayon (ABS-CBN 2)

=== Unknown ===
- Mr. Bean (ABS-CBN 2)
- Mr. Bean: The Animated Series (ABS-CBN 2)
- Balikatan: Sa Bahay at Buhay (PTV 4)
- Beautiful Batangas (NBN 4)
- Communications and News Exchange Forum (NBN 4)
- Fistorama (NBN 4)
- Heart to Heart Talk (NBN 4)
- Independent Music Hub (NBN 4)
- Kita Mo Na, Galing ng Pinoy (NBN 4)
- Komento (PTV 4)
- Music Link (NBN 4)
- Neighbours (NBN 4)
- Ombudsman: Kakampi mo Laban sa Katiwalian (NBN 4)
- Pilipinas Ngayon Na! (NBN 4)
- Sambuhay TV Mass (NBN 4)
- She...Ka! (NBN 4)
- Straight to the Point (NBN 4)
- Takip Silip (NBN 4)
- Solar's Big Ticket (Solar TV 9)
- Astig! (TV5)
- Big Shot Jackpot (TV5)
- Katok sa Kusina (TV5)
- Lupet (TV5)
- Magic? Gimik! Revealed (TV5)
- Star Confessions (TV5)
- Swerte-Swerte Lang (TV5)
- 8 Kingdom (TV5)
- Cheer up on Love (TV5)
- Don't Cry, My Love (TV5)
- Ed, Edd n Eddy (TV5)
- First Wives' Club (TV5)
- Flames of Desire (TV5)
- Good Wife, Bad Wife (TV5)
- League of Super Evil (TV5)
- My Gym Partner's a Monkey (TV5)
- My Wife is a Superwoman (TV5)
- Scooby-Doo, Where Are You! (TV5)
- What's for Dinner? (TV5)
- Full Time Moms (GMA News TV 11)
- Life and Style with Ricky Reyes (Q 11)
- Smile TV (Q 11)
- Asin at Ilaw (IBC 13)
- Bagong Maunlad na Agrikultura (IBC 13)
- Buhay Pinoy (IBC 13)
- By Request (IBC 13)
- FNRI Puppet Videos (IBC 13)
- Gabay at Aksyon (IBC 13)
- Gintong Uhay (IBC 13)
- Hataw Pinoy (IBC 13)
- Health Med (IBC 13)
- It's My Life with Troy Montero (IBC 13)
- Nation's Peacemakers (IBC 13)
- RX: Nutrisyon at Kalusugan (IBC 13)
- Sagupaan Global Cockfights (IBC 13)
- SSS: Kabalikat Natin (IBC 13)
- This is Your Day (IBC 13)
- Tinig ng Kanyang Pagbabalik (IBC 13)
- Bread Tambayan (UNTV 37)
- Candidly Speaking with Willie (UNTV 37)
- Doc on TV (UNTV 37)
- Estranghero (UNTV 37)
- Kayo ang Humatol (UNTV 37)
- Kilalanin Natin (UNTV 37)
- Senate Hearing (UNTV 37)
- Start Your Day The Christian Way (UNTV 37)
- Value Vision (UNTV 37)
- Arts.21 (Net 25)
- Discovery Germany (Net 25)
- Euromaxx (Net 25)
- Akazukin Chacha (Studio 23)
- Ani-Yoko (Studio 23)
- BakéGyamon (Studio 23)
- Chu, Chu, My Daddy (Studio 23)
- Cuore (Studio 23)
- Fairy Tale Police Department (Studio 23)
- Gallery Fake (Studio 23)
- Hot Shot (Studio 23)
- Little Women (Studio 23)
- Love at First Fight (Studio 23)
- Negima!? (Studio 23)
- Nitro Circus (Studio 23)
- Peter Pan and Wendy (Studio 23)
- Summer x Summer (Studio 23)
- The Adventures of Huck Finn (Studio 23)
- The X-Family (Studio 23)
- Batas Barangay (RHTV)
- Bayan Kontra Droga (RHTV)
- Bisalog (RHTV)
- Boses ng Masa (RHTV)
- BFF: Beauty, Fun & Fashion (RHTV)
- Dear PhilHealth (RHTV)
- DZRH Balita Alas-Kwatro (RHTV)
- DZRH Balita Alas-Sais (RHTV)
- DZRH Headline Balita (RHTV)
- DZRH Headlines (RHTV)
- DZRH Nationwide Balita (RHTV)
- Health Station DZRH (RHTV)
- Kalikasan, Kaunlaran (RHTV)
- Landbank (RHTV)
- Misteryo (RHTV)
- NYK: Now You Know! (RHTV)
- Pulso ng Pilipino (RHTV)
- Radyo Clinica (RHTV)
- Radyo Harana (RHTV)
- Radyo Hataw (RHTV)
- Sesyon (RHTV)
- Success TV (RHTV)
- Tinig ng Mamayanan (RHTV)
- Tuloy-Tuloy Pinoy (RHTV)
- Unilab Balita (RHTV)

== Networks ==
The following is a list of Free-to-Air and Local Cable Networks making noteworthy launches and closures during 2011.

=== Launches ===
Date	Station	Channel	Source
February 21	AksyonTV	Channel 41 (Metro Manila) / Channel 29 (Cebu and Davao)	
April 8	The Game Channel		
May 16	Nick Jr. (Southeast Asia)		
June 5	AKTV on IBC	13	
September 26	Hope Channel Philippines	45	
November 14	Telenovela Channel	Sky Cable Channel 60 (now Channel 81)	
December 24	CHASE	31	

=== Stations changing network affiliation ===
The following is a list of television stations that have made or will make noteworthy affiliation switches in 2011.

Date	Station	Channel	Prior affiliation	New affiliation	Notes	Source
February 21	DWNB-TV	41	silent	AksyonTV		
March 2	RPN	9	Solar TV	ETC		
March 2	SBN	21	ETC	Talk TV		
July 3	DWKC-TV	31	silent	BEAM TV		

=== Rebranded ===
The following is a list of television stations that have made or will make noteworthy network rebranded in 2011.

Date	Rebranded from	Rebranded to	Channel	Source
February 28	Q	GMA News TV	11; SkyCable Channel 24	
March 1	ZOE TV (2nd incarnation)	Light TV	33	
April 1	Nickelodeon (Southeast Asia)	Nickelodeon (Philippines)	SkyCable Channel 45	
July 11	Playhouse Disney (Asia)	Disney Junior (Asia)	SkyCable Channel 38	
July 12	E! (Asia)	E! (Philippines)	SkyCable Channel 57	
October 6	NBN	PTV (2nd incarnation)	4 SkyCable Channel 6	

=== Closures ===
Date	Station	Channel	Sign-on debut	Source
February 25	Solar TV	9	November 30, 2009	

== Births ==
- January 8: Bella Echarri, vlogger (d. 2023)
- May 10: Franchesco Maafi, actor
- June 5: JJ Quilantang, actor and host
- November 8: Nate Alcasid, young endorser and actor, the son of Regine Velasquez and Ogie Alcasid
- November 11: Angelika Rama

== Deaths ==
- January 5: Alfredo "Freddie" Vargas Jr., 63, father of actor Alfredo "Alfred" Vargas III, cardiac arrest (born 1947)
- February 2: Romeo Babao, 73, father of Julius Babao, brain hemorrhage (born 1937)
- March 3: Paquito Diaz, 73, actor and movie director (born 1937)
- March 20: John Apacible, 38, model-turned actor, gunshot wound (born 1973)
- April 17: AJ Perez, 18, actor, vehicular accident (born 1993)
- July 24: Emmanuel "Manny" Bal, 74, former anchor of DZRH, brain tumor (born 1937)
- September 23: Anthony Linsangan, 31, husband of Camille Prats, nasopharyngeal cancer (born 1979)
- October 29: Ram Revilla, 23, Filipino actor, half brother of Sen. Ramon "Bong" Revilla Jr. and son of former actor and Sen. Ramon Revilla Sr. (born 1988)
- October 31: Ricky Pempengco, 43, estranged father of Charice (born 1968)
- November 11: Lito Calzado, 65, former TV director/choreographer and father of actress Iza Calzado, liver cancer (born 1946)
- November 23: Magdalena Vargas, 54, mother of teen actor Jhake Vargas colon cancer (born 1957)
- December 4: RJ Rosales, 37, singer, actor, musical theatre performer, and TV presenter (born 1974)
- December 29: Tyron Perez, 26, Filipino actor, TV host, model, former StarStruck Alumni Batch 1 (born 1985)

== See also ==
- 2011 in television
