= 2010 in Philippine television =

The following is a list of events affecting Philippine television in 2010. Events listed include television show debuts, finales, cancellations, and channel launches, closures and rebrandings, as well as information about controversies and carriage disputes.

== Events ==
=== January ===
- January 8: ABS-CBN Corporation rebranded "ABS-CBNnow!" to "IWant TV", an over-the-top content streaming media service platform that airs or streams some favorite programs and shows, as well as livestreaming of its some well-loved channels.
- January 9: Sharon Cuneta (44-years-old) wins the top prize winner of 2 Million pesos of Who Wants to Be a Millionaire?.

=== February ===
- February 6: Ethel Booba, Long Mejia and Vice Ganda of the Team Boom Boom Pow wins the last defending champion of The Singing Bee: Season 5.
- February 13: Melisa Cantiveros wins Pinoy Big Brother: Double Up.
- February 16: MTV Philippines officially signed off on cable television with the last music video: Video Killed the Radio Star by The Buggles. After the closure, it had reverted to its original channel, MTV Southeast Asia.
- February 21: Sarah Lahbati and Steven Silva won the fifth season of StarStruck and later 24 Oras Weekend is replacing GMA Weekend Report, is anchored by Balitanghali anchor Pia Arcangel and Reporter's Notebook host Jiggy Manicad.

=== March ===
- March 6: Yoyo Tricker was hailed as the Ultimate Talentado in Talentadong Pinoy Season 1, the Battle of the Champions of which were held at Cuneta Astrodome.

=== April ===
- April 1: Smart Communications and 360media suspended the operations of myTV due to the service's expiration of its three-year permit to broadcast issued from National Telecommunications Commission.
- April 4: TV5 launches the "Kapatid" network.
- April 5: Aksyon, is the evening national newscast in Filipino of TV5, was launched with former GMA anchor Paolo Bediones and former ABS-CBN anchor Cheryl Cosim. In response to TV5's newscast Aksyon, News on Q made several changes, including Connie Sison joining the newscast replacing Rhea Santos (until she left on April 21) and rejoins Ivan Mayrina, extending its runtime to 1 hour and reverting to the Filipino language it used from November 11, 2005 to March 2, 2007.

=== May ===
- May 10–11: Automated national elections was held in the Philippines for the first time.

=== June ===
- June 13: 16-year-old singer Jovit Baldivino from Padre Garcia, Batangas Province wins the first season of Pilipinas Got Talent.
- June 19:
  - GMA Network celebrated their 60th anniversary on Philippine television at the Araneta Coliseum, its presentation was titled "GMA at 60: The Heart of Television".
  - TV5 celebrated its 50th anniversary on Philippine television.
- June 26: 17-year-old James Reid wins season 3 of Pinoy Big Brother: Teen Edition.
- June 30: ABS-CBN News and Current Affairs has reformatted its newscasts, TV Patrol, Bandila and News Patrol, the primetime editions opening billboards saying Magandang Gabi Pilipinas, Kami ang mga Patrol ng Pilipino, Nagbabalita at Naglilingkod sa inyo, Saan man sa Mundo and the late-night editions saying Sa mga balitang Bumabandila.

=== July ===
- July 3: Three days the ABS-CBN News and Current Affairs has revamped TV Patrol Sabado and TV Patrol Linggo into TV Patrol Weekend, anchored by Alex Santos and Bernadette Sembrano.
- July 23: Ruther Robosa emerged as Diz iz Kantahan Grand Champion.
- July 24: XB Gensan wins as Showtime's first grand champion, the grand finals of which were held at Ynares Sports Arena, Antipolo City.

=== August ===
- August 22: GMA launched their Lupang Hinirang MTV which also aired on Q (later GMA News TV) until April 9, 2013.

=== September ===
- September 30 – The Ateneo de Manila University Blue Eagles clinched the UAAP Season 73 men's basketball title after defeating the Far Eastern University Tamaraws 2–0 in game 2 of the best-of-three finals series held at the Smart Araneta Coliseum in Quezon City. This was their 3rd consecutive basketball championship title.

=== October ===
- October 23: Jugs Jugueta and Teddy Corpuz was hailed as Showtime's first anniversary champion.

=== November ===
- November 4: ABS-CBN launches the Christmas song Ngayong Pasko, Magniningning ang Pilipino, after the news program TV Patrol.
- November 8: Former Vice President Noli "Kabayan" de Castro and Korina Sanchez finally return as they joined with Ted Failon, replacing Julius Babao and Karen Davila on TV Patrol.
- November 22: Julius Babao and Karen Davila joined Ces Drilon, replacing Henry Omaga-Diaz and Korina Sanchez on Bandila.

=== December ===
- December 18: Laoag City Gymnastics Group wins as Showtime's second grand champion.
- December 31: Commercial model Alden Richards made his first television appearance on GMA New Year Countdown to 2011 in preparation for his first project called Alakdana.

== Premieres ==
Date	Show	Network	Source
January 3	Your Song: My Last Romance	ABS-CBN 2	
January 4	Daisy Siete: Bebe and Me	GMA 7	
January 4	Queen Seon Deok	GMA 7	
January 4	Kapuso Movie Festival (weekday edition)	GMA 7	
January 9	Kapuso Movie Festival (Saturday edition)	GMA 7	
January 10	Misteryo	Q 11	
January 11	Tanging Yaman	ABS-CBN 2	
January 11	The Last Prince	GMA 7	
January 13	American Idol: Season 9	Q 11	
January 17	True Stories	Q 11	
January 18	Gintama	ABS-CBN 2	
January 18	Kung Tayo'y Magkakalayo	ABS-CBN 2	
January 19	Laff En Roll	GMA 7	
January 22	Manibela	UNTV 37	
January 25	Kekkaishi	GMA 7	
January 25	Ina, Kasusuklaman Ba Kita?	GMA 7	
January 25	Magkano ang Iyong Dangal?	ABS-CBN 2	
January 31	Dear Friend: Almost A Love Story	GMA 7	
February 1	Precious Hearts Romances Presents: Love Is Only In The Movies	ABS-CBN 2	
February 1	Habang May Buhay	ABS-CBN 2	
February 6	Balitanghali Weekend	Q 11	
February 7	Your Song: Love Me, Love You	ABS-CBN 2	
February 7	Buso Renkin	ABS-CBN 2	
February 7	Healthy Cravings	Q 11	
February 8	Diz Iz It!	GMA 7	
February 8	Gumapang Ka sa Lusak	GMA 7	
February 8	First Time	GMA 7	
February 8	Agua Bendita	ABS-CBN 2	
February 11	SRO Cinemaserye: Meet the Fathers	GMA 7	
February 14	Q-Lets and Co.	Q 11	
February 15	Precious Hearts Romances Presents: The Substitute Bride	ABS-CBN 2	
February 15	Rubi	ABS-CBN 2	
February 20	Pilipinas Got Talent season 1	ABS-CBN 2	
February 21	24 Oras Weekend	GMA 7	
February 22	Melason In Love	ABS-CBN 2	
February 22	Panday Kids	GMA 7	
February 27	Agimat: Ang Mga Alamat ni Ramon Revilla: Tonyong Bayawak	ABS-CBN 2	
February 28	Zooperstars	GMA 7	
March 1	Headstart with Karen Davila	ANC	
March 1	Precious Hearts Romances Presents: You're Mine, Only Mine	ABS-CBN 2	
March 1	Kroko: Takas sa Zoo	IBC 13	
March 1	Diva	GMA 7	
March 3	Kandidato	GMA 7	
March 6	Agimat: Ang Mga Alamat ni Ramon Revilla: Tonyong Bayawak	ABS-CBN 2	
March 7	Dear Friend: My Stalking Heart	GMA 7	
March 7	Oggy and the Cockroaches	TV5	
March 8	Prince Mackaroo	TV5	
March 11	SRO Cinemaserye: Hot Mama	GMA 7	
March 13	Family Matters	TV5/NBN 4	
March 13	Tutok Tulfo	TV5	
March 14	USI: Under Special Investigation	TV5	
March 15	Precious Hearts Romances Presents: Lumang Piso Para sa Puso	ABS-CBN 2	
March 15	Wipeout! Matira Ang Matibay	GMA 7	
March 15	Music Uplate Live	ABS-CBN 2	
March 20	Honey Watch Out	ABS-CBN 2	
March 21	Your Song: Isla	ABS-CBN 2	
March 22	AutoVote 2010	IBC 13	
March 22	Face to Face	TV5	
March 22	5 Star Specials: The Diamond Star (Maricel Soriano)	TV5	
March 28	Party Pilipinas	GMA 7	
March 28	Pepito Manaloto	GMA 7	
March 29	Eyeshield 21 (season 2)	ABS-CBN 2	
April 4	Aha!	GMA 7	
April 4	My Darling Aswang	TV5	
April 4	Pidol's Wonderland	TV5	
April 5	Melason: In The City	ABS-CBN 2	
April 5	Daisy Siete: Adam Or Eve	GMA 7	
April 5	Sapul!	TV5	
April 5	My Wife is a Superwoman	TV5	
April 5	First Wives' Club	TV5	
April 5	Smile Honey	TV5	
April 5	High Kick!	TV5	
April 5	Aksyon Ngayon	TV5	
April 5	Aksyon	TV5	
April 5	Totoo TV	TV5	
April 5	Precious Hearts Romances Presents: Love Me Again	ABS-CBN 2	
April 5	Tonight with Arnold Clavio	Q 11	
April 6	Timbangan	TV5	
April 7	Dokumentado	TV5	
April 7	Lokomoko U	TV5	
April 10	Claudine	GMA 7	
April 10	Sunnyville	GMA 7	
April 10	Pinoy Big Brother: Teen Clash 2010	ABS-CBN 2	
April 10	Aksyon Weekend	TV5	
April 11	BFGF	TV5	
April 11	P.O.5	TV5	
April 11	Paparazzi	TV5	
April 16	Wachamakulit	GMA 7	
April 18	Dear Friend: Tisay	GMA 7	
April 19	Yu-Gi-Oh! Duel Monsters	GMA 7	
April 19	Knockout New Challenger	GMA 7	
April 24	Comedy Bar	GMA 7	
April 24	I Laugh Sabado	Q 11	
April 25	Your Song: Gimik 2010	ABS-CBN 2	
April 26	Take Me Out	GMA 7	
April 27	5 Star Specials: Ruffa	TV5	
May 3	Super Inggo at ang Super Tropa (rerun)	ABS-CBN 2	
May 10	Pretty Wicked	ETC on SBN 21	
May 10	Fastbreak News	UNTV 37	
May 11	Royal Pains	2nd Avenue on RJTV 29	
May 13	Rescue	GMA 7	
May 17	Rosalka	ABS-CBN 2	
May 17	Precious Hearts Romances Presents: Impostor	ABS-CBN 2	
May 22	The Front Act Show	Solar TV on RPN 9	
May 23	Love Bug: The Last Romance	GMA 7	
May 24	Simply KC	ABS-CBN 2	
May 24	Basahang Ginto	GMA 7	
May 24	Momay	ABS-CBN 2	
May 24	Magic Taste	Q 11	
May 26	X-Life	Q 11	
May 27	Material Girl	ETC on SBN 21	
May 29	Q Drama Classics	Q 11	
May 31	Langit sa Piling Mo	GMA 7	
June 5	Agimat: Ang Mga Alamat ni Ramon Revilla: Elias Paniki	ABS-CBN 2	
June 7	Pilyang Kerubin	GMA 7	
June 11	Future Perfect	ANC	
June 12	Pinoy M.D.	GMA 7	
June 14	Pokémon	GMA 7	
June 14	One Piece	GMA 7	
June 14	Just Kidding	Q 11	
June 16	Twin Princess of the Wonderplanet	Q 11	
June 16	5 Star Specials: JC	TV5	
June 20	Love Bug: Wish Come True	GMA 7	
June 21	Trudis Liit	GMA 7	
June 22	NYC Prep	ETC on SBN 21	
June 28	Endless Love	GMA 7	
June 28	The Wanda Sykes Show	2nd Avenue on RJTV 29	
June 28	Magkaribal	ABS-CBN 2	
June 28	Panahon Ko 'to!: Ang Game Show ng Buhay Ko	ABS-CBN 2	
June 28	Battle Spirits	TV5	
June 28	The Legend of Bruce Lee	Q 11	
June 30	TV Patrol	ABS-CBN 2/DZMM TeleRadyo	
July 1	Ben 10	TV5	
July 1	Hamtaro	TV5	
July 1	Yo Gabba Gabba!	TV5	
July 1	Makibaoh	TV5	
July 3	Twist and Shout	ABS-CBN 2	
July 3	M3: Malay Mo Ma-develop	ABS-CBN 2	
July 3	TV Patrol Weekend	ABS-CBN 2	
July 3	Yesterday	DZMM TeleRadyo	
July 3	Chuggington	TV5	
July 5	The Morning Show	NBN 4	
July 5	Get It Straight with Daniel Razon	UNTV 37	
July 5	Danz Showdown	GMA 7	
July 5	Hole in the Wall (season 2)	GMA 7	
July 5	Split	TV5	
July 5	Idaten Jump	Q 11	
July 5	I Love You	Q 11	
July 6	Launch My Line	ETC on SBN 21	
July 7	Storyline	ABS-CBN 2	
July 11	Camp Tiger	TV5	
July 11	Celebrity Cook-Off	TV5	
July 12	Noah	ABS-CBN 2	
July 12	Precious Hearts Romances Presents: Midnight Phantom	ABS-CBN 2	
July 12	Kabayan	ABS-CBN 2/DZMM TeleRadyo	
July 12	Monster Allergy	Studio 23	
July 12	Digimon Frontier	Studio 23	
July 12	BakéGyamon	Studio 23	
July 12	MetaJets	Studio 23	
July 12	Detective Conan	GMA 7	
July 18	Love Bug: Exchange of Hearts	GMA 7	
July 20	Spin It, Win It	GMA 7	
July 24	Kaya ng Powers	GMA 7	
July 25	Your Song: Maling Akala	ABS-CBN 2	
July 26	Dora the Explorer	ABS-CBN 2	
July 26	SpongeBob SquarePants	ABS-CBN 2	
July 26	Legendary Knight	Q 11	
July 26	Kapuso Movie Festival (weekday edition)	GMA 7	
July 31	Avatar: The Legend of Aang	ABS-CBN 2	
July 31	Pilipinas Win Na Win	ABS-CBN 2	
July 31	Kapuso Movie Festival (Saturday edition)	GMA 7	
August 2	Kapamilya Blockbusters	ABS-CBN 2	
August 2	Ilumina	GMA 7	
August 2	Magandang Umaga South Central Mindanao	ABS-CBN TV-3 General Santos and ABS-CBN TV-5 Cotabato	
August 2	Celebrity Sweethearts	Q 11	
August 7	You've Been Served	2nd Avenue on RJTV 29	
August 9	Love ni Mister, Love ni Misis	GMA 7	
August 9	Teledyaryo Final Edition	NBN 4	
August 9	Teledyaryo News Bulletin	NBN 4	
August 9	Teledyaryo Sports	NBN 4	
August 9	Black and White	TV5	
August 14	JejeMom	GMA 7	
August 16	He's Beautiful	ABS-CBN 2	
August 16	East of Eden	GMA 7	
August 16	MMK Klasik	DZMM TeleRadyo	
August 16	Precious Hearts Romances Presents: Martha Cecilla's Kristine	ABS-CBN 2	
August 16	Time Between Dog and Wolf	TV5	
August 20	The Vampire Diaries	ETC on SBN 21	
August 20	Parenthood	2nd Avenue on RJTV 29	
August 22	Anatomy of a Disaster	GMA 7	
August 22	Jollitown (season 3)	GMA 7	
August 23	Ang Yaman ni Lola	GMA 7	
August 30	Survivor Philippines: Celebrity Showdown	GMA 7	
August 30	S.R.O.: Suhestyon, Reaksyon, at Opinion	DZMM TeleRadyo	
September 1	League of Super Evil	TV5	
September 4	The Powerpuff Girls	TV5	
September 4	Johnny Bravo	TV5	
September 4	Popstar Diaries	PBO	
September 5	WWE Superstars	Studio 23	
September 6	1DOL	ABS-CBN 2	
September 6	Zoids: Genesis	Studio 23	
September 6	Inday Wanda	TV5	
September 6	Sarah Geronimo Concert Series	TV5	
September 6	Wow Meganon	TV5	
September 6	Batman: The Brave and the Bold	TV5	
September 7	Hapi Together	TV5	
September 7	Journo	TV5	
September 7	Delicioso	Q 11	
September 7	Executive News	GEMTV	
September 8	Lady Dada	TV5	
September 9	Untold Stories mula sa Face to Face	TV5	
September 9	Public Atorni	TV5	
September 11	Wansapanataym (2nd incarnation)	ABS-CBN 2	
September 11	Alagang Kapatid	TV5	
September 11	Astig!: Sa Sports Walang Tsamba!	TV5	
September 11	Ed, Edd n Eddy	TV5	
September 11	Jumong	Q 11	
September 12	Your Song: Beautiful Girl	ABS-CBN 2	
September 12	Star Factor	TV5	
September 13	Grazilda	GMA 7	
September 13	My Gym Partner's a Monkey	TV5	
September 13	Invincible Shan Bao Mei	Q 11	
September 15	Hellcats	ETC on SBN 21	
September 16	America's Next Top Model (cycle 15)	ETC on SBN 21	
September 18	Asar Talo Lahat Panalo!	GMA 7	
September 20	Precious Hearts Romances Presents: Alyna	ABS-CBN 2	
September 20	Kokey at Ako	ABS-CBN 2	
September 20	Bantatay	GMA 7	
September 22	Glee season 2	ETC on SBN 21	
September 26	Reel Love Presents Tween Hearts	GMA 7	
September 27	Temptation of Wife	GMA 7	
October 4	Imortal	ABS-CBN 2	
October 4	Iba-Balita	Studio 23	
October 6	The Naughty Kitchen with Chef Blythe Beck	2nd Avenue on RJTV 29	
October 9	LOL: Laugh or Lose	TV5	
October 10	Metal Fight Beyblade	ABS-CBN 2	
October 10	Your Song: Andi	ABS-CBN 2	
October 10	Star Power	ABS-CBN 2	
October 11	Koreana	GMA 7	
October 18	Beauty Queen	GMA 7	
October 18	Chowder	TV5	
October 18	Dexter's Laboratory	TV5	
October 18	Worlds Within	Q 11	
October 23	Wiling Willie	TV5	
October 25	Sapul sa Singko	TV5	
October 25	Aksyon JournalisMO	TV5	
October 25	Little Star	GMA 7	
October 25	Juanita Banana	ABS-CBN 2	
October 25	Down with Love	ABS-CBN 2	
October 25	The Adventures of Jimmy Neutron, Boy Genius	ABS-CBN 2	
October 25	My Driver Sweet Lover	TV5	
October 25	Mara Clara	ABS-CBN 2	
October 25	Aksyon Alert	TV5	
October 26	Patrol ng Pilipino	ABS-CBN 2	
October 28	The Gates	2nd Avenue on RJTV 29	
October 30	Isyu Ngayon (weekly edition)	GMA 7 (Cebu, Iloilo, Davao and Dagupan)	
October 30	Aksyon Sabado	TV5	
October 31	All About Adam	IBC 13	
October 31	Solar's Big Ticket	Solar TV	
October 31	Aksyon Linggo	TV5	
November 1	Balitaang Tapat	TV5	
November 8	Perfect Match	ABS-CBN 2	
November 8	The Trapp Family	Q 11	
November 15	Gen M	ETC on SBN 21	
November 20	Hanep Buhay	GMA 7	
November 20	Kapuso Film Festival	GMA 7	
November 22	Let’s Dance	Q 11	
November 22	Pretty Little Liars	ETC on SBN 21	
November 22	Kapuso Movie Festival (weekday edition)	GMA 7	
November 22	Isyu Ngayon (daily edition)	GMA 7 (Bicol, Bacolod, Cagayan de Oro and General Santos)	
November 25	Extra Express	IBC 13	
November 27	Kapuso Movie Festival (Saturday edition)	GMA 7	
November 29	Shoutout!	ABS-CBN 2	
November 29	Jillian: Namamasko Po	GMA 7	
December 4	Laugh Out Loud	ABS-CBN 2	
December 4	My Husband's Woman	Q 11	
December 4	Last Romance	Q 11	
December 6	Sabel	ABS-CBN 2	
December 6	Puso ng Pasko: Artista Challenge	GMA 7	
December 8	Star Confessions	TV5	
December 9	Krusada	ABS-CBN 2	
December 13	Handy Manny	TV5	
December 13	Special Agent Oso	TV5	
December 13	Phineas and Ferb	TV5	
December 18	Misteryo	GMA 7	
December 20	Mazinger Edition Z: The Impact!	Q 11	
December 20	Operation Love	Q 11	

=== Unknown Dates ===
- March:
  - Street Fighter II V on TV5
  - Fullmetal Alchemist: Brotherhood on TV5
- April: Clannad on TV5
- July: Huntik: Secrets & Seekers on ABS-CBN 2
- August: Teledyaryo Business on NBN 4
- September:
  - Camp Lazlo on TV5
  - Oplan Zero Tambay on TV5
- December: Kick Buttowski: Suburban Daredevil on TV5

=== Unknown ===
- Bluffing with Bodie & Paolo on Q 11
- Hayop Atbp. on Q 11
- Life and Style with Ricky Reyes on Q 11
- Power Review on Q 11
- Smile TV on Q 11
- Yu-Gi-Oh! Duel Monsters on Q 11
- Ako Mismo on TV5
- Broken Hearts Club on TV5
- House or Not on TV5
- Lupet on TV5
- Magic? Gimik! Revealed on TV5
- Tech Trip on TV5
- Misa Nazareno on TV5
- DOG TV on Solar TV 9
- Ang Pangarap Kong Jackpot on NBN 4
- Communications and News Exchange Forum on NBN 4
- People, Politics and Power on NBN 4
- Pilipinas Ngayon Na! on NBN 4
- Straight to the Point on NBN 4
- She Said, She Said on NBN 4
- GSIS Members Hour on NBN 4
- Nation's Peacemakers on IBC 13
- SSS: Kabalikat Natin on IBC 13
- Bagong Maunlad na Agrikultura on IBC 13
- Chinatown TV on IBC 13
- Two Stops Over with Paco Guerrero on 2nd Avenue (RJTV 29)
- Ating Alamin on UNTV 37
- Candidly Speaking with Willie on UNTV 37
- Climate Change: Ang mga Dapat Malaman ni Juan on UNTV 37
- Dito Po sa Amin on UNTV 37
- Easy Lang Yan! on UNTV 37
- Estranghero on UNTV 37
- Face Off on UNTV 37
- Kayo ang Humatol on UNTV 37
- Kilalanin Natin on UNTV 37
- Law Profile on UNTV 37
- Polwatch: Political Watch on UNTV 37
- Rotary in Action on UNTV 37
- Chinoy TV on Net 25
- Footprints on Net 25
- I-Balita Update on Net 25
- Pananampalataya, Pag-asa at Pag-ibig on Net 25
- Hana Yori Dango (rerun) on ABS-CBN 2

== Returning or renamed programs ==
Show	Last aired	Retitled as/Season/Notes	Channel	Return date
American Idol	2009	Same (season 9)	Q	January 13
Philippine Basketball Association	2010 (season 35: "Philippine Cup")	Same (season 35: "Fiesta Conference")	Solar TV / Solar Sports / Basketball TV	March 21
Totoo TV	2007 (ABC)	Same	TV5	April 5
Shakey's V-League	2009 (season 6: "2nd Conference")	Same (season 7: "1st Conference")	NBN	April 11
National Collegiate Athletic Association	2010	Same (season 86)	Studio 23	June 26
Endless Love	2004	Same (Philippine adaptation)	GMA	June 28
TV Patrol World	2010	TV Patrol (2nd incarnation)	ABS-CBN / DZMM TeleRadyo	June 30
TV Patrol Sabado/Linggo	2010	TV Patrol Weekend	ABS-CBN	July 3
Hole in the Wall	2009	Same (season 2)	GMA	July 5
University Athletic Association of the Philippines	2010	Same (season 73)	Studio 23	July 10
Shakey's V-League	2010 (season 7: "1st Conference")	Same (season 7: "2nd Conference")	NBN	July 11
Jollitown	2009	Same (season 3)	GMA	August 22
Survivor Philippines	2009 (season 2: "Palau")	Same (season 3: "Celebrity Showdown")	GMA	August 30
Wansapanataym	2005	Same (2nd incarnation)	ABS-CBN	September 11
Kokey	2007	Kokey at Ako	ABS-CBN	September 20
Philippine Basketball Association	2010 (season 35: "Fiesta Conference")	Same (season 36: "Philippine Cup")	Solar TV / Solar Sports / Basketball TV	October 3
Wowowee	2010 (ABS-CBN)	Willing Willie	TV5	October 23
Mara Clara	1997	Same (2010)	ABS-CBN	October 25
National Basketball Association	2010	Same (2010–11 season)	Solar TV / Basketball TV / NBA Premium TV	October 27
ASEAN Basketball League	2010 (TV5)	Same (2010–11 season)	IBC	October
Trapp Family Singers	1993 (ABS-CBN)	The Trapp Family	Q	November 8
Batibot	1999 (GMA)	Same	TV5	November 27
Jojo A. All the Way!	2010	The Medyo Late Night Show with Jojo A.	TV5	Unknown

== Programs transferring networks ==
Date	Show	No. of seasons	Moved from	Moved to
March	Street Fighter II V	—N/a	ABS-CBN / GMA	TV5
April 19	Yu-Gi-Oh! Duel Monsters	—N/a	ABS-CBN	GMA
May 22	The Front Act Show	—N/a	TV5	Solar TV
July 26	Dora the Explorer	—N/a	GMA / TV5	ABS-CBN
July 26	SpongeBob SquarePants	—N/a	TV5	ABS-CBN
July 31	Avatar: The Legend of Aang	—N/a	TV5	ABS-CBN
September 4	The Powerpuff Girls	—N/a	GMA	TV5
September 4	Johnny Bravo	—N/a	GMA	TV5
September 13	My Gym Partner's a Monkey	—N/a	RPN (now Solar TV) / Q	TV5
September	Camp Lazlo	—N/a	RPN (now Solar TV) / Q	TV5
October 4	Wonder Pets!	—N/a	TV5	Studio 23
October 23	Wowowee	—N/a	ABS-CBN	TV5 (as Willing Wille)
October	ASEAN Basketball League	2	TV5	IBC
November 8	The Trapp Family	—N/a	ABS-CBN (as Trapp Family Singers)	Q (now GTV) (as The Trapp Family)
November 27	Batibot	—N/a	GMA	TV5
December 18	Misteryo	—N/a	Q	GMA
Unknown	Cheche Lazaro Presents	—N/a	GMA	ABS-CBN
Unknown	CHInoyTV	—N/a	IBC	Net 25
Unknown	Dial M	—N/a	NBN	IBC

== Finales ==
- January 1:
  - Sis (GMA 7)
  - Fated to Love You... Again (GMA 7)
  - Daisy Siete: My Shuper Sweet Lover (GMA 7)
- January 8:
  - Three Dads with One Mommy (rerun) (ABS-CBN 2)
  - Katorse (ABS-CBN 2)
  - Sana Ngayong Pasko (GMA 7)
  - Shining Inheritance (GMA 7)
- January 9: Halad sa Kapamilya (ABS-CBN TV-3 Cebu)
- January 15: Dahil May Isang Ikaw (ABS-CBN 2)
- January 22:
  - Nagsimula sa Puso (ABS-CBN 2)
  - Tinik sa Dibdib (GMA 7)
- January 24: Dear Friend: My Christmas List (GMA 7)
- January 29: Precious Hearts Romances Presents: My Cheating Heart (ABS-CBN 2)
- January 30: Kids on Q (Q 11)
- January 31: Your Song: My Last Romance (ABS-CBN 2)
- February 5:
  - Kapuso Movie Festival (weekday edition) (GMA 7)
  - Kaya Kong Abutin ang Langit (GMA 7)
  - Ikaw Sana (GMA 7)
  - May Bukas Pa (ABS-CBN 2)
- February 6:
  - Kapuso Movie Festival (Saturday edition) (GMA 7)
  - Power Rangers: Jungle Fury (ABS-CBN 2)
  - The Singing Bee: Season 5 (ABS-CBN 2)
- February 7: George and Cecil (ABS-CBN 2)
- February 12:
  - Precious Hearts Romances Presents: Love Is Only In The Movies (ABS-CBN 2)
  - Pinoy Big Brother: Double Up (ABS-CBN 2)
- February 19:
  - Darna (GMA 7)
  - Starstruck Shoutout (GMA 7)
- February 20: GMA Weekend Report (GMA 7)
- February 21:
  - StarStruck 5 (GMA 7)
  - Super Inggo at ang Super Tropa (ABS-CBN 2)
- February 25: Case Unclosed (GMA 7)
- February 26:
  - Precious Hearts Romances Presents: The Substitute Bride (ABS-CBN 2)
  - Full House (GMA 7)
- February 27:
  - Agimat: Ang Mga Alamat ni Ramon Revilla: Pepeng Agimat (ABS-CBN 2)
  - UAAP Season 72 Men's and Women's volleyball tournament (Studio 23)
- February 28:
  - SOP (GMA 7)
  - Dear Friend: Almost A Love Story (GMA 7)
- March 4: SRO Cinemaserye: Meet the Fathers (GMA 7)
- March 7:
  - Front Act (TV5)
  - Your Song: Love Me, Love You (ABS-CBN 2)
- March 12:
  - Precious Hearts Romances Presents: You're Mine, Only Mine (ABS-CBN 2)
  - Wow Hayop (GMA 7)
- March 13: Bitoy's Showwwtime (GMA 7)
- March 15: Kwentong Talentado (TV5)
- March 21: BandaOke: Rock n' Roll to Millions (GMA 7)
- March 26:
  - Gintama (ABS-CBN 2)
  - Lokomoko High (TV5)
- March 27: WWE Raw (TV5)
- March 28:
  - Shall We Dance (TV5)
  - WWE SmackDown (TV5)
- March 30: Kiddie Kwela (TV5)
- March 31:
  - Daisy Siete: Bebe and Me (GMA 7)
  - Precious Hearts Romances Presents: Lumang Piso Para sa Puso (ABS-CBN 2)
  - Melason In Love (ABS-CBN 2)
  - Ogags (TV5)
  - Play with Me Sesame (TV5)
  - Postman Pat (TV5)
  - TEN: The Evening News (TV5)
  - Q Tube (Q 11)
- April 8:
  - Melason In Da City (ABS-CBN 2)
  - SRO Cinemaserye: Hot Mama (GMA 7)
- April 9:
  - Maria de Jesus: Ang Anghel sa Lansangan (ABS-CBN 2)
  - Joey's Quirky World (GMA 7)
- April 11: Dear Friend: My Stalking Heart (GMA 7)
- April 17: Cool Center (GMA 7)
- April 18: Your Song: Isla (ABS-CBN 2)
- April 21: 5 Star Specials: The Diamond Star (Maricel Soriano) (TV5)
- April 30:
  - Melason Promdi Heart (ABS-CBN 2)
  - Jewel in the Palace (Q 11)
- May 7: AutoVote 2010 (IBC 13)
- May 9: Q-Lets and Co. (Q 11)
- May 14:
  - Magkano ang Iyong Dangal? (ABS-CBN 2)
  - Precious Hearts Romances Presents: Love Me Again (ABS-CBN 2)
  - Habang May Buhay (ABS-CBN 2)
  - A.M.Y. (About Me and You) (DZMM TeleRadyo)
- May 15: Bones season 3 (Fox Channel Philippines)
- May 16:
  - Dear Friend: Tisay (GMA 7)
  - Chuck season 1 (Fox Channel Philippines)
- May 19: Fit & Fab (Q 11)
- May 21:
  - Ina, Kasusuklaman Ba Kita? (GMA 7)
  - Tanging Yaman (ABS-CBN 2)
  - Super Inggo at ang Super Tropa (rerun) (ABS-CBN 2)
  - Night after Night (Q 11)
- May 22:
  - RunnerSpeak (Q 11)
  - Just Joking! (Q 11)
  - Life’s Funniest Moments (Q 11)
- May 23:
  - CBS Evening News (Q 11)
  - Clean House (Q 11)
- May 27:
  - American Idol season 9 (Q 11)
  - Shakey's V-League 7th Season 1st Conference (NBN 4)
- May 28: First Time (GMA 7)
- May 29:
  - Agimat: Ang Mga Alamat ni Ramon Revilla: Tonyong Bayawak (ABS-CBN 2)
  - The Tyra Banks Show (ETC on SBN 21)
- June 4: Panday Kids (GMA 7)
- June 9: 5 Star Specials: Ruffa (TV5)
- June 10: America's Next Top Model cycle 14 (ETC on SBN 21)
- June 11:
  - Yu-Gi-Oh! Duel Monsters (GMA 7)
  - Kekkaishi (GMA 7)
  - Bluffing with Bodie & Paolo (Q 11)
- June 13:
  - Love Bug: The Last Romance (GMA 7)
  - Pilipinas Got Talent season 1 (ABS-CBN 2)
- June 18:
  - Gumapang Ka sa Lusak (GMA 7)
  - Powerful Opponents (Q 11)
  - Kroko: Takas sa Zoo (IBC 13)
- June 25:
  - The Last Prince (GMA 7)
  - Street Fighter II V (TV5)
  - Go, Diego, Go! (TV5)
  - Blue's Clues (TV5)
- June 26:
  - TV Patrol Sabado (ABS-CBN 2/DZMM TeleRadyo)
  - Pinoy Big Brother: Teen Clash 2010 (ABS-CBN 2)
- June 27:
  - TV Patrol Linggo (ABS-CBN 2/DZMM TeleRadyo)
  - Zooperstars (GMA 7)
  - Rocko's Modern Life (TV5)
  - El Tigre: The Adventures of Manny Rivera (TV5)
  - ChalkZone (TV5)
  - Catscratch (TV5)
  - Legends of the Hidden Temple (TV5)
- June 28: Pretty Wicked (ETC on SBN 21)
- June 29:
  - One Morning Cafe (NBN 4, Solar TV on RPN 9 and IBC 13)
  - TV Patrol World (ABS-CBN 2/DZMM TeleRadyo)
- June 30:
  - Dora the Explorer (TV5)
  - The Adventures of Jimmy Neutron (TV5)
  - Avatar: The Legend of Aang (TV5)
  - CatDog (TV5)
  - Danny Phantom (TV5)
  - SpongeBob SquarePants (TV5)
  - Wonder Pets (TV5)
  - Probe Profiles (ABS-CBN 2)
- July 1: Material Girl (ETC on SBN 21)
- July 2:
  - Daisy Siete: Adam Or Eve (GMA 7)
  - Take Me Out (GMA 7)
  - Get It Straight with Jay and Willie (UNTV 37)
  - My Wife is a Superwoman (TV5)
  - Astro Boy (Q 11)
  - Beethoven Virus (Q 11)
- July 9:
  - Kung Tayo'y Magkakalayo (ABS-CBN 2)
  - Todo Balita (ABS-CBN 2/DZMM TeleRadyo)
- July 11:
  - Love Bug: Wish Come True (GMA 7)
  - Your Song: Gimik 2010 (ABS-CBN 2)
- July 17: Pinoy Records (GMA 7)
- July 24: Diz Iz It! (GMA 7)
- July 30:
  - Wowowee (ABS-CBN 2)
  - Diva (GMA 7)
  - Magandang Umaga Socsksargen (ABS-CBN TV-3 General Santos) and (ABS-CBN TV-5 Cotabato)
  - Just Kidding (Q 11)
- August 6:
  - Batingaw (NBN 4)
  - NBN Sports (NBN 4)
  - Hero (TV5)
- August 7: Claudine (GMA 7)
- August 8: Minuto (NBN 4)
- August 12: Queen Seondeok (GMA 7)
- August 13:
  - Rubi (ABS-CBN 2)
  - Precious Hearts Romances Presents: Midnight Phantom (ABS-CBN 2)
  - Maalaala Mo Kaya sa DZMM (DZMM TeleRadyo)
- August 27: Pilyang Kerubin (GMA 7)
- August 28: Agimat: Ang Mga Alamat ni Ramon Revilla: Elias Paniki (ABS-CBN 2)
- August 29: Your Song: Maling Akala (ABS-CBN 2)
- August 31:
  - True Confections (Q 11)
  - Hamtaro (TV5)
- September 1:
  - Wow Mali (TV5)
  - 5 Star Specials: JC (TV5)
- September 2: Moomoo and Me (TV5)
- September 3:
  - Agua Bendita (ABS-CBN 2)
  - Split (TV5)
  - Battle Spirits (TV5)
  - MetaJets (Studio 23)
- September 4:
  - Everybody Hapi (TV5)
  - Sassy Girl Chun-hyang (Q 11)
- September 10:
  - Fullmetal Alchemist: Brotherhood (TV5)
  - Magic Taste (Q 11)
  - I Love You (Q 11)
- September 11:
  - Kapuso Movie Festival (Saturday edition) (GMA 7)
  - Y Speak (Studio 23)
  - Quick-E (Studio 23)
- September 17:
  - Precious Hearts Romances Presents: Impostor (ABS-CBN 2)
  - Momay (ABS-CBN 2)
  - Kapuso Movie Festival (weekday edition) (GMA 7)
  - Langit sa Piling Mo (GMA 7)
- September 18: Kulilits (ABS-CBN 2)
- September 19: Love Bug (GMA 7)
- September 21: Wipeout! Matira Ang Matibay (GMA 7)
- September 22: Ripley's Believe It or Not! (GMA 7)
- September 23:
  - Laff En Roll (GMA 7)
  - Shakey's V-League 7th Season 2nd Conference (NBN 4)
- September 24:
  - Basahang Ginto (GMA 7)
  - Wachamakulit (GMA 7)
- September 30: UAAP Season 73 men's basketball tournament (Studio 23)
- October 1:
  - Danz Showdown (GMA 7)
  - News Central (Studio 23)
- October 2:
  - Ka-Blog! (GMA 7)
  - Who Wants to Be a Millionaire? (TV5)
- October 3:
  - Sharon (ABS-CBN 2)
  - Hana Yori Dango (rerun) (ABS-CBN 2)
  - Your Song: Beautiful Girl (ABS-CBN 2)
- October 15:
  - Endless Love (GMA 7)
  - NCAA Season 86 basketball tournaments (Studio 23)
  - Celebrity Sweethearts (Q 11)
- October 16:
  - Twist and Shout (ABS-CBN 2)
  - Mustard TV (TV5 and TV Maria)
  - Inside the Fishbowl (TV5 and TV Maria)
- October 19: The Correspondents (ABS-CBN 2)
- October 22:
  - Sapul! (TV5)
  - Trudis Liit (GMA 7)
  - Simply KC (ABS-CBN 2)
  - Rosalka (ABS-CBN 2)
  - He's Beautiful (ABS-CBN 2)
  - 1DOL (ABS-CBN 2)
  - Kabayan (ABS-CBN 2)
- October 24:
  - Aksyon Ngayon (TV5)
  - Aksyon Weekend (TV5)
- October 29:
  - Time Between Dog and Wolf (TV5)
  - Black and White (TV5)
- October 30: Solar's Golden Ticket (Solar TV 9)
- November 5: Magkaribal (ABS-CBN 2)
- November 13:
  - Kaya ng Powers (GMA 7)
  - JejeMom (GMA 7)
- November 14: Jollitown (season 3) (GMA 7)
- November 19:
  - Ilumina (GMA 7)
  - Legendary Knight (Q 11)
- November 20: Asar Talo Lahat Panalo! (GMA 7)
- November 26: Panahon Ko 'to!: Ang Game Show ng Buhay Ko (ABS-CBN 2)
- November 27:
  - Hole In The Wall (season 2) (GMA 7)
  - M3: Malay Mo Ma-develop (ABS-CBN 2)
- November 28: Jumong (Q 11)
- December 2: I Survived: Hindi Sumusuko Ang Pinoy (ABS-CBN 2)
- December 3:
  - Kokey at Ako (ABS-CBN 2)
  - Survivor Philippines: Celebrity Showdown (GMA 7)
- December 5: Star Factor (Season 1) (TV5)
- December 9: America's Next Top Model (cycle 15) (ETC on SBN 21)
- December 12: Misteryo (Q 11)
- December 17:
  - Invincible Shan Bao Mei (Q 11)
  - Saru Getchu (Q 11)
- December 30: East of Eden (GMA 7)
- December 31:
  - Pilipinas Win Na Win (ABS-CBN 2)
  - Down with Love (ABS-CBN 2)
  - Puso ng Pasko: Artista Challenge (GMA 7)

=== Unknown Dates ===
- January: Chelsea Lately (ETC on SBN 21)
- May: Soul Mix (TV5 and TV Maria)
- June: The Working President (NBN 4, RPN 9 and IBC 13)
- July: Buso Renkin (ABS-CBN 2)
- August: Money Matters (NBN 4)
- October:
  - Y Speak (Studio 23)
  - Sarah Geronimo Concert Series (TV5)
  - Camp Tiger (TV5)
- December: Oplan Zero Tambay (TV5)

=== Unknown ===
- Huntik: Secrets & Seekers (ABS-CBN 2)
- Privileged (ETC on SBN 21)
- Barney & Friends (TV5)
- Takeshi's Castle (Q 11)
- Chances Are (Q 11)
- Events Incorporated (Q 11)
- Fashionistas by Heart (Q 11)
- Gandang Ricky Reyes (Q 11)
- My Favorite Recipes (Q 11)
- Philippine Explorer (Q 11)
- RunnerSpeak (Q 11)
- Counterpoint with Secretary Salvador Panelo (IBC 13)
- Dial M (IBC 13)
- Iyo Ang Katarungan (IBC 13)
- Ultimatum (IBC 13)
- Sine Komiks (IBC 13)
- Believer's Voice of Victory (IBC 13)
- Power & Mercy (IBC 13)
- Power to Unite with Elvira (IBC 13)
- 5 Max Movies (TV5)
- Action Packed Sabado (TV5)
- Baikingu (TV5)
- Biyaheng Bulilit (TV5)
- Broken Hearts Club (TV5)
- Keygma TV (TV5)
- MOG TV (TV5)
- Moomoo and Me (TV5)
- Promdi Chef (TV5)
- Tech Trip (TV5)
- The Word Exposed with Bishop Luis Antonio Tagle, D.D. (TV5)
- This New Life At Alabang New Life (TV5)
- Timbangan (TV5)
- URCC TV (TV5)
- Urban Tales: Tawatakutan (TV5)
- Urban Tribe (TV5)
- Front Act (TV5)
- Stoplight TV (TV5)
- The Adventures of Little Carp (TV5)
- Balita Ngayon (TV5)
- Balita Ngayon Weekend (TV5)
- News Advisory (TV5)
- House of Hoops (Solar TV 9)
- TruSports (Solar TV 9)
- Warriors: Celebrity Boxing Challenge (Solar TV 9)
- Ang Pangarap Kong Jackpot (NBN 4)
- Balitalakay (NBN 4)
- Mama Mary Holy Mass (NBN 4)
- Meet the Press (NBN 4)
- People's Government Mobile Action (NBN 4)
- Usapang Pulitika (NBN 4)
- Alarma (UNTV 37)
- Bantay OFW (UNTV 37)
- Barangay Hoopsters (UNTV 37)
- Checkpoint (UNTV 37)
- Climate Change: Ang mga Dapat Malaman ni Juan (UNTV 37)
- Dito Po sa Amin (UNTV 37)
- Estranghero (UNTV 37)
- Face Off (UNTV 37)
- Go, NGO! (UNTV 37)
- Just for Laughs Gags (Jack TV)
- BakéGyamon (Studio 23)
- Digimon Frontier (Studio 23)
- Monster Allergy (Studio 23)
- Zoids: Genesis (Studio 23)

== Networks ==
=== Launches ===
- April 12: Screen Red
- July 26: Universal Channel
- September 19: Diva Universal
- October 16: NBA Premium TV
- December 20: CgeTV

==== Unknown ====
- E!

=== Rebranded ===
- January 1: Star Movies Asia → Star Movies Philippines
- September 19: Hallmark Channel → Diva Universal
- December 4: AXN Beyond Southeast Asia → AXN Beyond Philippines

=== Closures ===
- February 16: MTV Philippines
- August 17: MMDA TV
- September 18: Hallmark Channel Philippines
- September 30: Maxxx

== Births ==
- February 9: Shane Bernabe, singer
- February 19: Alonzo Muhlach, child actor
- September 15: Robbie Wachtel, child actor
- October 1: Onyok Pineda, child actor
- October 3: Seth dela Cruz, child actor
- October 7: Lucho Agoncillo, the son of Judy Ann Santos and Ryan Agoncillo
- October 14: Leanne Bautista, child actress

== Deaths ==
- January 6: Mila Ocampo, 68, former actress and mother of Snooky Serna (born 1941)
- February 26: Oscar Obligacion, 86, veteran comedian (born 1924)
- March 5: Marco Polo Garcia, 39, former child star (born 1970)
- April 12: Palito (Reynaldo Hipolito), 76, veteran comedian (born 1933)
- July 23: Prospero Luna, 79, comedian-actor (born 1931)
- July 25: Redford White (Cipriano Cermeno II), 54, actor and comedian (born 1955)
- August 8: Charlie Davao, 75, Filipino actor, father of actor Ricky Davao (born 1935)
- August 11: Margaret Jao-Grey, 57, Filipino journalist and columnist Philippine Star and Business Mirror (born 1952)
- August 21: Melody Gersbach, 24, Binibining Pilipinas International 2009 (born 1986)
- October 7: Metring David, 90, actress-comedian (born 1920)
- October 30: Kirk Abella, 32, Filipino actor (born 1978)
- November 16: Wyngard Tracy, 58, talent manager & television personality
- December 26: Pablo Gomez, 81, writer, radio announcer of DZRH and director (born 1929)
- December 29: Rejoice Rivera (Dianne Marie Santos), 26, actress, model, dancer and singer, member of Baywalk Bodies (born 1984)

== See also ==
- 2010 in television
