= Renz Valerio =

Filipino actor

- Born: Renz Michael Vijungco Valerio; November 10, 1998 (age 28); Antipolo, Rizal, Philippines
- Occupations: Actor, commercial model
- Years active: 2006–present
- Agents: GMA Artist Center (2006–2020); GMA Films

Renz Michael Vijungco Valerio (born November 10, 1998) is a Filipino actor and model.

== Career ==
Valerio started his career as a TV commercial model and gained attention when he appeared in Lady's Choice sandwich spread commercial with the popular tagline "Isipin mo na lang ham yan!". The commercial went viral that it was even spoof in Bubble Gang. In 2006, he started his career a child star in QTV's Noel, where he played the title role. From then on, he stars in different GMA drama series and movies.

In 2011, Valerio gained attention and was nominated as Best Child Actor in 60th FAMAS Awards for his deft portrayal as the young Luis in the critically acclaimed film The Road.

== Filmography ==
=== Film ===
Year	Title	Role
2006	Manay Po!	Young Orson Castello
2008	My Bestfriend's Girlfriend	Christian
2009	Little Boy Big Boy	Zach
2011	My House Husband: Ikaw Na!	Stephen
2011	The Road	Young Luis
2014	Overtime	Bryan
2016	Vampires' Transformation: #UsapangVampire na 'yan! (2016 Short Film)	Nathan

=== Television ===
Year	Title	Role
2006	Love to Love: Love-an o Bawi	
2006	Noel	Noel
2006	Atlantika	Young Aquano
2006	Sugo	Young Miguel / Amante
2007	Muli	Joshua
2007	Sine Novela: My Only Love	Young Billy
2007	Kamandag	Young Vergel
2008	Joaquin Bordado	Jimboy Apacible
2008–2009	Batang Bibbo	Bo / Co-host
2009	Ang Babaeng Hinugot sa Aking Tadyang	Achilles Valdez
2009	Jollitown	
2009	All My Life	Luke Estrella
2009	Darna	Young Eduardo
2009	Sana Ngayong Pasko	Young Gordon
2009	SRO Cinemaserye: Rowena Joy	JR
2010	Sine Novela: Ina, Kasusuklaman Ba Kita?	Young Rav
2010	Diva	Lee
2010	Love Bug Presents:The Last Romance	Joshua
2010–2011	Bantatay	Junix Razon
2011	My Chubby World	Himself/host
2011	Futbolilits	Sherwin Portero
2012	My Chubby World Big Adventure	Himself/host
2012	Hiram na Puso	Young Prince
2012	Spooky Nights Presents: Kalansay	Sherwin
2012	Together Forever	Rasputin "Raz" Trinidad
2012	Cielo de Angelina	Keith Roque
2013	The Jollitown Kids Show	Justin
2013	Maynila: Winner Sa Puso	James
2013	Magpakailanman: The Susan Fuentes Story	Raffy
2013	Party Pilipinas	Himself/Performer
2013	Walang Tulugan with the Master Showman	Himself/Performer
2013	Mga Basang Sisiw	Justin Santos
2013	One Day, Isang Araw: Ang Alaga Kong Kapre	Kuya #2
2013	Pyra: Ang Babaeng Apoy	Marc Santiago
2014	Niño	Rafael Ibarra
2014	Ismol Family	Luigi
2014	Maynila: My Number One Fan	Benedict
2014	Magpakailanman: Sa Bangin Ng Kamatayan	John Rey
2016	Maynila: Fan Mode	Billy
2016	Karelasyon: Duwende	Abet
2016–2017	Hahamakin ang Lahat	Puloy Dionisio
2017	Magpakailanman: Justice for the Battered Child	Mark
2018	The Cure	Cesar
2019	Inagaw na Bituin	Philip Bautista

== Accolades ==
=== Awards and nominations ===
Year	Organization	Category	Work	Result
2012	60th FAMAS Awards	Best Child Actor	The Road	Nominated
2013	ENPRESS Golden Screen TV Awards	Outstanding Educational Program Host	My Chubby World	Nominated
