= Amazing Cooking Kids =

2011 Philippine television reality show

- Title card
- Genre: Reality competition
- Presented by: Carmina Villarroel
- Judges: Rosebud Benitez; Jackie Ang-po; GB Barlao
- Country of origin: Philippines
- Original language: Tagalog
- No. of episodes: 12

Production
- Camera setup: Multiple-camera setup
- Running time: 21–27 minutes
- Production company: GMA Entertainment TV

Original release
- Network: GMA Network
- Release: April 16 – July 16, 2011

Amazing Cooking Kids is a 2011 Philippine television reality cooking competition series broadcast by GMA Network. Hosted by Carmina Villarroel, it premiered on April 16, 2011. The show concluded on July 16, 2011, with a total of 12 episodes.

The series is streaming online on YouTube.

== Contestants ==
Top 18

- Angela Rosales - Quezon City - Most Amazing Cooking Kids 11 yrs old
- Ronin Leviste - Mindoro - 1st runner up 11 yrs old
- Duday Reyes - Quezon City - 2nd runner up 11 yrs old
- Budik Villalobos - Cebu - Eliminated 9th 9 yrs old
- Tasha Pulgado - Bulacan - Eliminated 8th 11 yrs old
- Xymon Caballero - Caloocan - Eliminated 7th 11 yrs old
- Pat Reyes - Mandaluyong - Eliminated 6th 12 yrs old
- Dingdong Lagman - Cagayan de Oro City - Eliminated 5th 12 yrs old
- Paulo Sablaya - Quezon City - Eliminated 4th 10 yrs old
- Ice Almalmani - Parañaque - Eliminated 3rd 9 yrs old
- Nica Fortuno - Batangas- Eliminated 2nd 9 yrs old
- Tarah Santos - Muntinlupa - Eliminated 1st 9 yrs old

== Judges ==
- Rosebud Benitez
- Jackie Ang-Po
- GB Barlao

== Challenges ==
- Episode 1: Specialty dish
- Episode 2: Asian food
- Episode 3: Seafood
- Episode 4: Rice topping
- Episode 5: Ice cream dessert
- Episode 6: Pinoy dish
- Episode 7: Picnic plate
- Episode 8: Pasta dish
- Episode 9: Cake
- Episode 10: Chicken dish
- Episode 11: Signature dish of GB Barlao
- Episode 12: World class Pinoy dishes

== Ratings ==
According to AGB Nielsen Philippines' Mega Manila household television ratings, the pilot episode of Amazing Cooking Kids earned an 11.7% rating.

== Accolades ==
Accolades received by Amazing Cooking Kids
Year	Award	Category	Recipient	Result	Ref.
2012	26th PMPC Star Awards for Television	Best Reality/Game Show	Amazing Cooking Kids	Nominated	
