= Noel (TV series) =

2006 Philippine television drama series

- Genre: Drama
- Starring: Renz Valerio
- Opening theme: "Natutulog Ba ang Diyos?"
- Country of origin: Philippines
- Original language: Tagalog
- No. of episodes: 50

Production
- Camera setup: Multiple-camera setup
- Running time: 30 minutes
- Production company: GMA Entertainment TV

Original release
- Network: QTV
- Release: April 24 – June 30, 2006

Noel is a 2006 Philippine television drama series broadcast by QTV. Starring Renz Valerio in the title role, it premiered on April 24, 2006. The series concluded on June 30, 2006, with a total of 50 episodes.

== Cast and characters ==
Lead cast

- Renz Valerio as Noel

Supporting cast

- Gina Alajar
- Jay Aquitania
- Davin Nadal
- James Blanco
- Paolo Contis
- Tanya Garcia
- Pen Medina
- Kurt Perez
- Celia Rodriguez
