= Net 25 News Update =

Philippine television show

- Genre: News broadcasting
- Country of origin: Philippines
- Original language: Filipino

Production
- Production locations: EBC Bldg., #25 Central Avenue, New Era, Quezon City, Philippines
- Camera setup: Multiple-camera setup
- Running time: 2-8 minutes

Original release
- Network: Net 25
- Release: October 24, 2011 – present

Net 25 News Update (formerly Eagle News Update) is a Philippine television news broadcasting show broadcast by Net 25. It aired from October 24, 2011 to present, replacing i-Balita Update.
