= Crime Klasik =

Philippine documentary television show

- Genre: Documentary, crime
- Created by: Associated Broadcasting Company
- Developed by: News5
- Directed by: Eric dela Cruz; Abbie S.J. Lara
- Presented by: Martin Andanar
- Narrated by: Martin Andanar
- Country of origin: Philippines
- Original language: Tagalog
- No. of episodes: 59

Production
- Executive producers: Archie Madrid; Jallawee Balitan
- Running time: 30 minutes

Original release
- Network: AksyonTV
- Release: December 2, 2011 – January 30, 2013

Crime Klasik is a Philippine television investigative docudrama show broadcast by AksyonTV and TV5. Hosted by Martin Andanar, it aired from December 2, 2011 to January 30, 2013. On October 3, 2012, the program has moved to new day and timeslot, every Wednesday at 8:30 to 9:00 p.m.

== Overview ==
The program features celebrated crime cases in the Philippines.

== Host ==
- Martin Andanar

== Awards ==
=== Volunteer Against Crime and Corruption ===
- 2015 - Best Host for Martin Andanar

== See also ==
- Case Unclosed
