= In the Limelight =

2011 Philippine television news show

- Title card
- Genre: News broadcasting
- Presented by: Rhian Ramos; Nelson Canlas; Aubrey Carampel
- Country of origin: Philippines
- Original language: Tagalog

Production
- Camera setup: Multiple-camera setup
- Running time: 30 minutes
- Production company: GMA News and Public Affairs

Original release
- Network: GMA News TV
- Release: February 28 – October 7, 2011

In the Limelight is a 2011 Philippine television entertainment news broadcasting show broadcast by GMA News TV. Anchored by Rhian Ramos, Nelson Canlas and Aubrey Carampel, it premiered on February 28, 2011. The show concluded on October 7, 2011.

== Premise ==
The show features different entertainment news and features on different entertainment industry issues.

== Accolades ==
Accolades received by In the Limelight
Year	Award	Category	Recipient	Result	Ref.
2011	8th Golden Screen TV Awards	Outstanding Showbiz Talk Program	In the Limelight	Nominated	
