= Buhay OFW =

- Also known as: World Class Kababayan
- Genre: Public service program
- Created by: Marissa del Mar
- Developed by: Millicent Productions; News5 (2011–19); GMA News and Public Affairs (2019)
- Written by: Lina Mae Love; Jean Cequina; Mariss Guro
- Directed by: Nitz Magsino
- Presented by: Marissa del Mar; Princess Adriano (segment host)
- Theme music composer: Vehnee Saturno
- Opening theme: "Buhay OFW" by Vehnee Saturno
- Ending theme: "Buhay OFW" by Vehnee Saturno
- Country of origin: Philippines
- Original language: Tagalog (Filipino)

Production
- Executive producer: Grace Adriano
- Running time: 60 minutes (with commercials)
- Production company: Millicent Productions

Original release
- Network: AksyonTV
- Release: September 10, 2011 – January 12, 2019
- Network: 5 Plus
- Release: January 19 – March 30, 2019
- Network: GMA News TV
- Release: July 27 – October 19, 2019
- Network: RPTV

Related
- Up Close and Personal with Marissa del Mar

Buhay OFW (English: life of an OFW) is a Philippine television public affairs show broadcast by AksyonTV, 5 Plus and GMA News TV. Hosted by Marissa del Mar, it aired on AksyonTV from September 10, 2011, to January 12, 2019. The show moved to 5 Plus from January 19 to March 30, 2019, and GMA News TV as World Class Kababayan from July 27 to October 19, 2019. The program also featured government and non-government organizations who are charged with taking care of the concerns of OFWs such as labor and recruitment issues.
