= Chu, Chu, My Daddy =

2007 Taiwanese television series

Chu, Chu, My Daddy (Chinese: 親親小爸; pinyin: Qing Qing Xiao Ba) is a 15 episode Taiwanese television drama of the family/comedy genre. It was broadcast on CTS / GTV between 14 February and 5 March 2007.

== Plot ==
Upon the death of their most beautiful mother in the whole wide world, the rich but helpless orphan sisters are left to fend for themselves against their greedy great-aunt, who is plotting to seize their fortune and kick them out of their big, luxurious house. To counter their great-aunt's evil plot, the sisters hire a man to assume the role of their mother's newly married and sadly widowed husband. This plan may just work and fool their great-aunt's prying eye, if only their half-sister would stop trying to kick their new daddy out of the house.[

== Cast ==
- Julian Yang as Liu Fu Rong 劉福榮
- Jaline Yeh as Hong Zhen Ni 洪珍妮
- Cynthia Wang as Zhou Su Jie 周舒潔
- Rou You Xuan (羅幼軒) as Zhou Su Qi 周舒琪
- Lu Ting Wei as Su Bo Hao 蘇柏豪
- Zhang Shan Jie as Yang Guan Nan 楊光男
- Wasir Zhou as Big D 大 D
- Huang Wen Xuan as Ah Jian 阿健
- Shi Jing Jing as Amy
- Ge Wei Ru as Xu Mei Yin 徐媚茵
- Alexia Gao as Yan Jia Ren 顏佳人
- Huang Tai An as Ah Biao 阿標
- Jiang Wei Wen (蔣偉文) as David 大衛
- Lin Mei Xiu as Yang's mother 楊媽媽
- Xu Xiao Shun (許效舜) as Hong Yu Tou 洪竽頭
- Billie as Great-aunt Hu 胡姑婆
- Wu Jia Wei (吳珈偉) as Lu Lu 露露

== Production credits ==
- Producer: Jiang Feng Hong
- Director: Lin Qing Zhen
- Screenwriter: Chen Hui Zhen / Xie Su Fen

== Music ==
- Opening theme song: "Huai Huai Mei Li Mao" ("壞壞沒禮貌") by Julian Yang
- End theme song: "Ai Qing Bu Shi Yi Ge Jian Dan De Ming Ci" ("愛情不是個簡單的名詞") by Julian Yang
