= Laff En Roll =

2010 Philippine television comedy show

- Genre: Comedy
- Presented by: Boy 2 Quizon; Glaiza de Castro; Tuesday Vargas
- Country of origin: Philippines
- Original language: Tagalog

Production
- Executive producer: Wilma Galvante
- Camera setup: Multiple-camera setup
- Running time: 30 minutes
- Production company: GMA Entertainment TV

Original release
- Network: GMA Network
- Release: January 19 – September 23, 2010

Laff En Roll is a 2010 Philippine television comedy show broadcast by GMA Network. Hosted by Boy 2 Quizon, Glaiza de Castro and Tuesday Vargas, it premiered on January 19, 2010 on the network's A Bilib Ka Ba Araw-Araw line up. The show concluded on September 23, 2010.

== Hosts ==
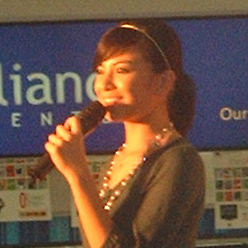
Glaiza de Castro served as a host.

- Boy 2 Quizon
- Glaiza de Castro
- Tuesday Vargas

== Ratings ==
According to AGB Nielsen Philippines' Mega Manila household television ratings, the pilot episode of Laff En Roll earned a 9.6% rating. The final episode scored a 3.3% rating in Mega Manila People/Individual television ratings.

== Accolades ==
Accolades received by Laff En Roll
Year	Award	Category	Recipient	Result	Ref.
2010	24th PMPC Star Awards for Television	Best Gag Show	Laff En Roll	Nominated	
