= Kitchen Superstar =

2011 Philippine television reality show

- Title card
- Genre: Reality competition
- Presented by: Marvin Agustin
- Country of origin: Philippines
- Original language: Tagalog
- No. of episodes: 63

Production
- Camera setup: Multiple-camera setup
- Running time: 30 minutes
- Production company: GMA News and Public Affairs

Original release
- Network: GMA Network
- Release: April 4 – July 1, 2011

Kitchen Superstar is a 2011 Philippine television reality competition cooking show broadcast by GMA Network. Hosted by Marvin Agustin, it premiered on April 4, 2011. The show concluded on July 1, 2011, with a total of 63 episodes.

== Premise ==
The program sought to discover the best non-professional cook in the Philippines. The contestants were selected from auditions in National Capital Region, Pangasinan, Pampanga, Davao City, Naga, Cebu and Iloilo.

The prizes for the winner; PH₱ 1,000,000, a chance to shine as a culinary A-lister and to star in his/her own cooking show.

== Ratings ==
According to AGB Nielsen Philippines' Mega Manila household television ratings, the pilot episode of Kitchen Superstar earned a 13.6% rating. The final episode scored a 4.3% rating in Mega Manila People/Individual television rating.
