= Rosebud Benitez =

Filipino chef

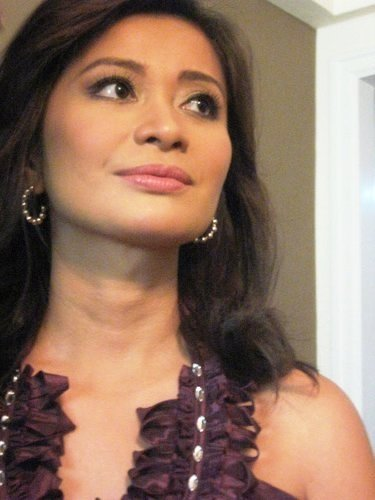
- Chef Rosebud Benitez in 2011
- Born: Rosebud Benitez; 1977 (age 48–49); Quezon City, Philippines
- Known for: Celebrity chef
- Awards: 2009 People Asia’s Women of Style and Substance; 2010 PMPC Star Awards for TV

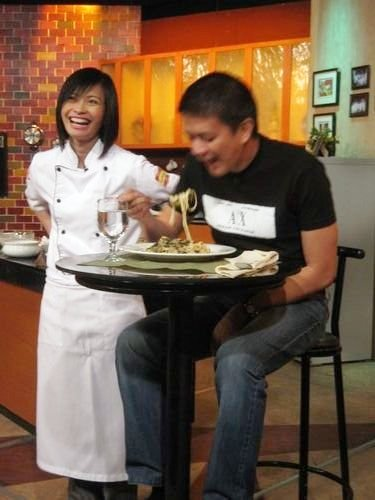
Chef Rosebud Benitez on the set of Ka-Toque, with guest Senator Francis Escudero

Rosebud Benitez is a Filipina celebrity chef and the host of Quickfire, a 10-minute television cooking show broadcast on GMA News TV (formerly known as Q, now GTV), a sister station of GMA Network. It has an offshoot DVD compilation of highlight episodes. Before Quickfire, Benitez was part of the culinary group program Ka-Toque, that spawned a whole new generation of broadcast cuisine productions and chef-hosts. Though wedged within a smorgasbord of equally sociable young chefs in Ka-Toque, Benitez became the first in the group to be given a solo show and the only non-actress to be invited by GMA Artist Center to join its register of contract stars.

After graduating from the Center for Culinary Arts, Manila, Benitez (who has the nickname “Chef Mom”) has become a public culinary figure in the Philippines, billboards for the food company Ajinomoto and status as a requested chef to conduct cooking demonstrations for corporate events and TV programs. She has hosted and presented media and live events and has appeared as a guest in TV productions of varying formats and genres. She has also been featured in lifestyle magazines, broadsheets, photo exhibits, and food blogs on wmn.ph; selected as one of the seven society women to represent the scent of S.T. Dupont Rose in Manila; nominated in the 2009 and 2010 PMPC Star Awards for TV; and honored as one of People Asia’s “Women of Style and Substance” for 2009.

Benitez lives in Quezon City with her children Katrina and Kyle.

== Filmography ==
=== Television ===
- Ka-Toque: Lutong Barkada (2005–2009), QTV/Q
- Quickfire: 10-Minute Kitchen Wonders (as solo host, 2008–2012), Q/GMA News TV
