= Up Close and Personal (talk show) =

- Also known as: Up Close and Personal with Marissa del Mar
- Genre: Talk show
- Created by: Millicent Productions
- Written by: Mimi Galimba; Jeans Cequiña
- Directed by: Lala Villanueva
- Presented by: Marissa del Mar
- Theme music composer: Vehnee Saturno; Popsie Saturno
- Opening theme: "Up Close and Personal"
- Ending theme: "Up Close and Personal"
- Country of origin: Philippines
- No. of episodes: n/a

Production
- Executive producer: Nitz Magsino
- Running time: 30 minutes
- Production companies: IBC News and Public Affairs; Millicent Productions

Original release
- Network: Intercontinental Broadcasting Corporation
- Release: 2002 – June 1, 2011

Related
- Buhay OFW

Up Close and Personal with Marissa del Mar is a Philippine television public affairs show broadcast by IBC. Hosted by Marissa Del Mar, it aired from 2002 to June 1, 2011.

== Background ==
Up Close and Personal peered onto the positive side of what life has to offer. It was an informative television program that features heart-warming success stories of people through segments on lifestyle, business, events, and places of interest. More specifically, it has a special public service feature that promotes civic-mindedness and concern to special needs and special attention to children and other people who have less in life.

== See also ==
- List of Philippine television shows
