= Quickfire (TV program) =

Philippine television cooking show

- Title card
- Genre: Cooking show
- Presented by: Rosebud Benitez
- Country of origin: Philippines
- Original languages: Tagalog; English

Production
- Camera setup: Multiple-camera setup
- Running time: 15 minutes
- Production company: GMA Entertainment TV

Original release
- Network: Q (2008–11); GMA News TV (2011–12)
- Release: May 5, 2008 – June 29, 2012

Quickfire: 10-Minute Kitchen Wonders is a Philippine television cooking show television program broadcast by Q and GMA News TV. Hosted by Rosebud Benitez, it premiered on May 5, 2008. The show concluded on June 29, 2012.

== Overview ==
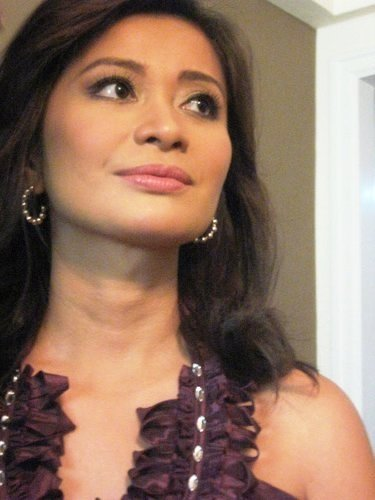
Rosebud Benitez served as the host

It showcases recipes by its host, celebrity chef Rosebud Benitez. Occasionally, the program adopts a theme per season (e.g. "Seafood Festival Season", "Market Tour Season", etc.) and also features Filipino celebrities as guests.

In 2009, GMA Records released a series of DVD compilations of Quickfire highlight episodes.
