= Front Row (TV program) =

Philippine television documentary show

- Title card
- Genre: Documentary
- Country of origin: Philippines
- Original language: Tagalog

Production
- Camera setup: Multiple-camera setup
- Running time: 30 minutes
- Production company: GMA News and Public Affairs

Original release
- Network: GMA News TV (March 5, 2011 – 2014, July 27, 2020 – December 2020); GMA Network (February 10, 2014 – March 9, 2020, January 4, 2021 – March 8, 2021)
- Release: March 5, 2011 – March 8, 2021

Front Row is a Philippine television documentary show broadcast by GMA News TV and GMA Network. It premiered on GMA News TV on March 5, 2011. The show moved to GMA Network on February 10, 2014, on the network's Monday evening line up. The show concluded on GMA Network on March 9, 2020. The show returned to GMA News TV on July 27, 2020, on the network's Power Block line up. The show returned to GMA Network on January 4, 2021. The show concluded on March 8, 2021.

== Production ==
In March 2020, production was halted due to the enhanced community quarantine in Luzon caused by the COVID-19 pandemic. The show resumed its programming on July 27, 2020.

== Accolades ==
Accolades received by Front Row
Year	Award	Category	Recipient	Result	Ref.
2011	Golden Screen TV Awards	Outstanding Documentary Program	"Bente Dos"	Nominated	
2014	Golden Screen TV Awards	Outstanding Documentary Program	"Super Tatay"	Nominated	
2014	28th PMPC Star Awards for Television	Best Documentary Program	Front Row	Nominated	
2014	UNICEF Asia-Pacific Child Rights Award		Front Row	Won	
2015	29th PMPC Star Awards for Television	Best Documentary Program	Front Row	Nominated	
2015	US International Film and Video Festival		Front Row	Won	
2016	30th PMPC Star Awards for Television	Best Documentary Program	Front Row	Nominated	
2016	US International Film and Video Festival	Creative Excellence (Social Issues category)	"Maestra Salbabida"	Won	
2017	US International Film and Video Festival		Front Row	Won	
2017	31st PMPC Star Awards for Television	Best Documentary Program	Front Row	Nominated	
