= Del Monte Kitchenomics =

Philippine television cooking show

- Title card
- Genre: Cooking show
- Country of origin: Philippines
- Original language: Tagalog

Production
- Camera setup: Multiple-camera setup
- Running time: 30 minutes
- Production company: Del Monte Foods Inc.

Original release
- Network: ABS-CBN (1989–95, 2000–04); GMA Network (1995–2000, 2012–15); GMA News TV (2011)
- Release: 1989 – 2015

Del Monte Kitchenomics is a Philippine television cooking show broadcast by ABS-CBN, GMA Network and GMA News TV. Sponsored by Del Monte Foods, it premiered in 1989 in ABS-CBN's morning line up. The show concluded in 2015.

== Hosts ==
- Rob Pengson
- Love Añover
- Luigi Muhlach
- Jolina Magdangal
- Dino Ferari
- Eugene Domingo
- Jackie Ang-Po
- Carla Abellana
