= The Naughty Kitchen with Chef Blythe Beck =

- Genre: Reality TV
- No. of seasons: 1
- No. of episodes: 8

Original release
- Network: Oxygen
- Release: September 22 – November 17, 2009

The Naughty Kitchen With Chef Blythe Beck is a reality based TV series that aired on Oxygen between September and November 2009. The show featured Texas native Blythe Beck, who was the new executive chef at Central 214 restaurant inside the Hotel Palomar, a luxury boutique hotel in the heart of Dallas, Texas. The show followed Blythe Beck and her staff inside and outside the kitchen as they interact with the Dallas elite and the locals.

== Cast ==
- Chef Blythe Beck, the main chef of Central 214
- Eric (a.k.a. Jimmy or Monkey), the sous chef of Central 214
- Megan, the general manager of Central 214
- Kerri, an event coordinator of Central 214
- Curtis, Central 214's new summer host
- Emily, another host at Central 214
- Calvin, a Central 214 waiter
- Robyn, Central 214's cocktail waitress
- Sam, the cocktail server/waiter at Central 214
- Roy, a server/waiter at Central 214

== Episodes ==
No.	Title	Original release date
1	"Better Wear Your Stretchy Pants"	September 22, 2009
2	"Cooking Up Love"	September 29, 2009
3	"In It To Win It"	October 6, 2009
4	"Sex, Lies, and Drinking Games"	October 13, 2009
5	"Fired Up"	October 20, 2009
6	"It's a Naughty Business"	November 3, 2009
7	"I'm Sorry to Say Goodbye"	November 10, 2009
8	"Reviews, Revenge and Redemption"	November 17, 2009

== See also ==
- Official website
