= My Chubby World =

2011 Philippine television infotainment show

- Title card
- Genre: Infotainment
- Developed by: Augie Rivera
- Directed by: Don Michael Perez; Noel Añonuevo
- Presented by: Renz Valerio; Daniella Amable; Gianna Cutler; Zyrael Jestre
- Country of origin: Philippines
- Original language: Tagalog
- No. of episodes: 26

Production
- Executive producer: Gigi Santiago Lara
- Camera setup: Multiple-camera setup
- Running time: 30 minutes
- Production companies: GMA Entertainment TV; Rebisco

Original release
- Network: GMA Network
- Release: May 14, 2011 – August 4, 2012

My Chubby World is a Philippine television infotainment children's show broadcast by GMA Network. Hosted by Renz Valerio, Daniella Amable, Gianna Cutler and Zyrael Jestre, it premiered on May 14, 2011. The show concluded on August 4, 2012, with a total of 25 episodes.

== Overview ==
The program showcased children's love for playing, creating, performing and discovering things about the world. Every episode, it gives a fun countdown of things and activities that children are interested in.

Every episode, the hosts enumerate Top 7 things that kids like for the topic or theme of the week—be it children's favorite sports, pets, earth-friendly habits, entertainment and more.

Directed by Don Michael Perez, the program helps kids stay up to date. It also guides parents through things that get their children enthusiastic and all fired up.

During its second season in 2012 (adding the subtitle Big Adventure), the show reformats from being a straight educational program into an educational challenge race where every week, there are two kiddie contestants representing a school from Metro Manila. The contestants must accomplish the three stages of challenges (physical, mental and immersion challenge) and find the hidden Chubby. The winner will be awarded a cash prize as well as the represented school.

The second season was directed by Noel Añonuevo.

== Hosts ==
- Renz Valerio
- Daniella Amable
- Gianna Cutler
- Zyrael Jestre

== Ratings ==
According to AGB Nielsen Philippines' Mega Manila household television ratings, the final episode of My Chubby World scored a 2.7% rating.

== Accolades ==
Accolades received by My Chubby World
Year	Award	Category	Recipient	Result	Ref.
2013	10th Golden Screen TV Awards	Outstanding Educational Program	My Chubby World	Nominated	
2013	10th Golden Screen TV Awards	Outstanding Educational Program Host	Renz Valerio	Nominated	
