= Futbolilits =

2011 Philippine television drama series

- Title card
- Genre: Sports drama
- Written by: Aloy Adlawan; Kit Villanueva-Langit; AA Nadela; Maribel Ilag
- Directed by: Mike Tuviera
- Creative director: Jun Lana
- Starring: Julian Trono; Yogo Singh; Renz Valerio
- Opening theme: "Futbolilits" by Renz Valerio, Yogo Singh and Isabel Frial
- Country of origin: Philippines
- Original language: Tagalog
- No. of episodes: 75

Production
- Executive producer: Michelle R. Borja
- Camera setup: Multiple-camera setup
- Running time: 16–26 minutes
- Production company: GMA Entertainment TV

Original release
- Network: GMA Network
- Release: July 4 – October 14, 2011

Futbolilits is a 2011 Philippine television drama sports series broadcast by GMA Network. Directed by Mike Tuviera, it stars Julian Trono, Yogo Singh and Renz Valerio. It premiered on July 4, 2011 on the network's Telebabad line up. The series concluded on October 14, 2011, with a total of 75 episodes.

The series is streaming online on YouTube.

== Cast and characters ==
Cast

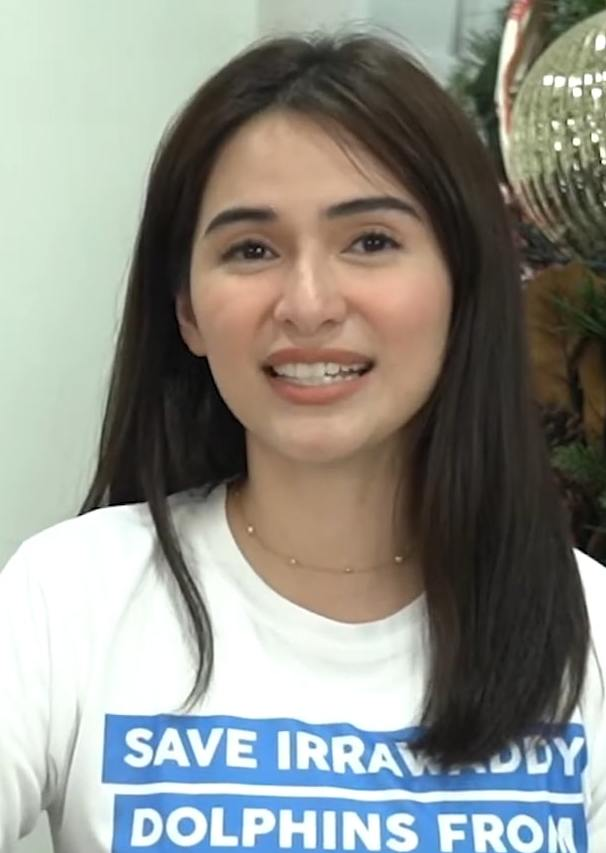
Jennylyn Mercado

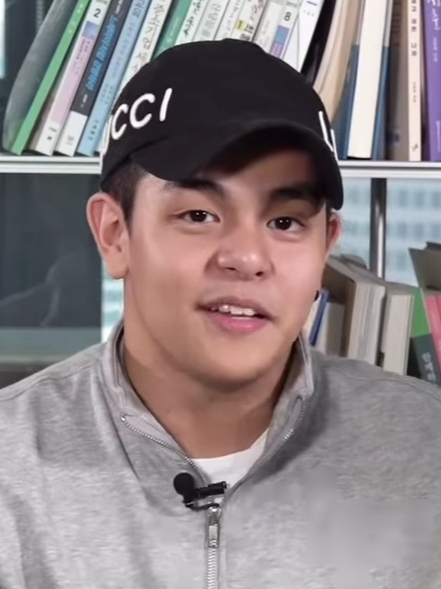
Julian Trono

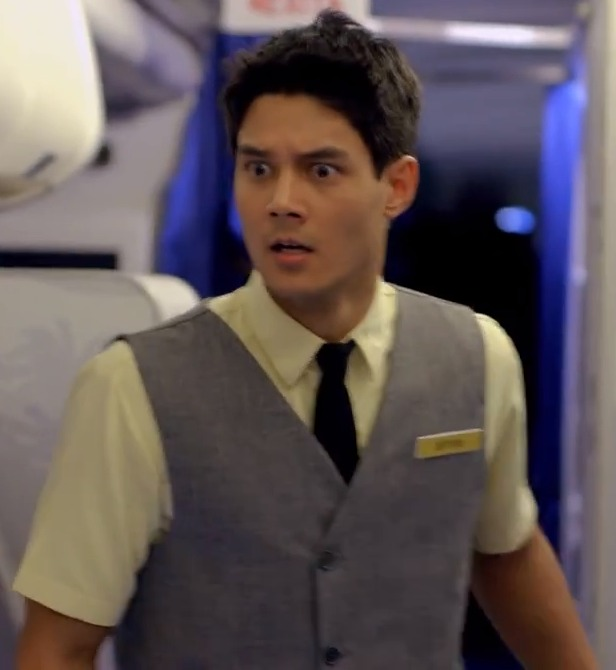
Daniel Matsunaga

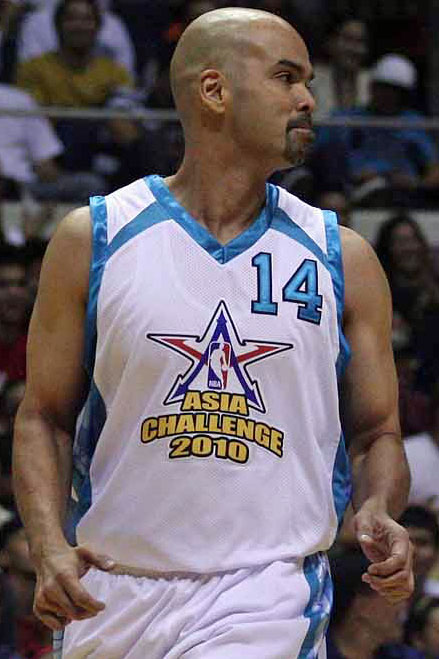
Benjie Paras

Lead cast

- Julian Trono as Hero Melendez / Salvador / Francis Ocampo
- Yogo Singh as Kikoy Estrella
- Renz Valerio as Sherwin Portero

Supporting cast

- Raymart Santiago as Frankie Ocampo
- Jennylyn Mercado as Lani Melendez
- Angelika Dela Cruz as Belinda Almodovar
- Paolo Contis as Enrico Almodovar
- Isabel Frial as Tetang Cortes
- Nova Villa as Ester Cortes
- Benjie Paras as Harrison Fortunato
- Daniel Matsunaga as Raphael Yamamoto
- Kokoy de Santos as Mercury "Merc" Almodovar
- Francis Magundayao as Diego Roxas
- Gabriel Roxas as Prince Dimagiba
- JM Reyes as Adonis Dimagiba
- Mosang as Beauty Dimagiba

Guest cast

- Vaness del Moral as Clarissa "Isay" Estrella
- Miggy Jimenez as Dagul Cordones
- Byron Ortile as Topakits de Lantero
- Jhiz Deocareza as Kulas Sonar
- Gene Padilla as Temio Dimagiba
- Richard Quan as Danny Salvador
- Alyssa Alano as Gegay
- Debraliz Velasote as Yoya
- Freddie Webb as Sensei
- Miguel Tanfelix as Andy
- Isabelle Daza as Claudette
- Ehra Madrigal as Maricar Ocampo

== Ratings ==
According to AGB Nielsen Philippines' Mega Manila household television ratings, the final episode of Futbolilits scored a 16.3% rating.
