= 2011 Shakey's V-League SEA Club Invitational =

Shakey's V-League 8th Season SEA Club Invitational
Women's Finals	G1	Wins
(Vietnam) Vietsovpetro	3	1
(Philippines) Philippine Army Lady Troopers	2	0
- Duration: Oct. 27–30, 2011
- Arena(s): Filoil Flying V Arena, San Juan
- Finals MVP: Conference: Ekaterina Martynova (Vietsovpetro)
- Winning coach: Aleksey Georgievic Diva
- TV network(s): NBN–4

The 2011 Shakey's V-League SEA Club Invitational was the 15th conference of the Shakey's V-League and the third and final conference of the 2011 season. It commenced on October 27, 2011, at The Arena in San Juan with clubs from Vietnam and Malaysia participating in the four-team tournament that also features local teams Philippine Army Lady Troopers and Ateneo Lady Eagles. Matches were aired on NBN 4 on a delayed basis.

== Participating teams ==
Abbr.	Team
ADM	(Philippines) Ateneo de Manila University Lady Eagles
MAS	Malaysia Club
PAR	(Philippines) Philippine Army Lady Troopers
VIE	(Vietnam) Vietsovpetro

== Tournament Format ==
=== Preliminaries ===
The four (4) competing teams will play in a Single Round-robin tournament where the top two teams dispute the championship and the two others clash for third place.

== Preliminary round ==
Pos	Team	Pld	W	L	Pts	SW	SL	SR	SPW	SPL	SPR	Qualification
1	(Vietnam) Vietsovpetro	3	3	0	9	9	1	9.000	249	190	1.311	Qualified for Finals
2	(Philippines) Philippine Army Lady Troopers	3	2	1	6	6	3	2.000	216	167	1.293	Qualified for Finals
3	(Philippines) Ateneo Lady Eagles	3	1	2	2	3	8	0.375	191	258	0.740	
4	Malaysia Club	3	0	3	1	3	9	0.333	237	278	0.853	

All times are Philippine Standard Time (UTC+08:00)

Date	Time		Score		Set 1	Set 2	Set 3	Set 4	Set 5	Total	Report
Oct 27	14:00	PAR	3–0	MAS	25–14	25–18	25–21			75–53	
Oct 27	16:00	VIE	3–0	ADM	25–15	25–16	25–17			75–48	
Oct 28	14:00	PAR	0–3	VIE	20–25	23–25	23–25			66–75	
Oct 28	16:00	MAS	2–3	ADM	25–13	25–22	19–25	27–29	12–15	108–104	
Oct 29	14:00	PAR	3–0	ADM	25–13	25–9	25–17			75–39	
Oct 29	16:00	VIE	3–1	MAS	25–13	25–21	24–26	25–16		99–76	

== Final round ==
- All times are in Philippine Standard Time (UTC+08:00)

3rd place

Date	Time	Teams	Set	1	2	3	4	5	Total	Report
Oct 30	14:00	(Philippines) Ateneo Lady Eagles	0	22	21	13			56	
Oct 30	14:00	Malaysia Club	3	25	25	25			75	

Championship

Date	Time	Teams	Set	1	2	3	4	5	Total	Report
Oct 30	16:00	(Philippines) Philippine Army Lady Troopers	2	25	25	21	23	8	102	
Oct 30	16:00	(Vietnam) Vietsovpetro	3	18	14	25	25	15	97	

== Final standings ==
Rank	Team
1st place, gold medalist(s)	(Vietnam) Vietsovpetro
2nd place, silver medalist(s)	(Philippines) Philippine Army Lady Troopers
3rd place, bronze medalist(s)	Malaysia Club
4	(Philippines) Ateneo Lady Eagles

== Awards ==
=== Individual awards ===
Award	Name
Most Valuable Player	(Russia) Ekaterina Martynova (Vietsovpetro)
Best Scorer	(Russia) Ekaterina Martynova (Vietsovpetro)
Best Attacker	(Russia) Anactaxia Trernai (Vietsovpetro)
Best Blocker	Wong Fei Tien (Malaysia Club)
Best Server	(Philippines) Mary Jean Balse (Philippine Army)
Best Setter	(Philippines) Jamenea Ferrer (Ateneo)
Best Digger	(Philippines) Dennise Michelle Lazaro (Ateneo)
Best Receiver	(Vietnam) Tuyen Bui Vu Tuhani (Vietsovpetro)
