= Hanep Buhay =

Philippine television infotainment show

- Title card
- Genre: Infotainment
- Presented by: Love Añover; Chris Tiu
- Country of origin: Philippines
- Original language: Tagalog

Production
- Camera setup: Multiple-camera setup
- Running time: 30 minutes
- Production company: GMA News and Public Affairs

Original release
- Network: GMA Network
- Release: November 13, 2010 – November 26, 2011

Hanep Buhay (transl. cool life) is a Philippine television infotainment show broadcast by GMA Network. Hosted by Love Añover and Chris Tiu, it premiered on November 13, 2010. The show concluded on November 26, 2011.

It featured how to manage funds properly, start and set up a business and make better financial decisions.

== Hosts ==
- Love Añover
- Chris Tiu
