= Misteryo =

Philippine television documentary show

- Title card
- Genre: Documentary
- Presented by: Ryan Eigenmann
- Country of origin: Philippines
- Original language: Tagalog

Production
- Executive producer: Wilma Galvante
- Camera setup: Multiple-camera setup
- Running time: 17–23 minutes
- Production company: GMA News and Public Affairs

Original release
- Network: Q (January 10 – December 12, 2010); GMA Network (December 18, 2010 – July 9, 2011)
- Release: January 10, 2010 – July 9, 2011

Misteryo (transl. mystery) is a Philippine television horror documentary show broadcast by Q and GMA Network. Hosted by Ryan Eigenmann, it premiered on Q on January 10, 2010. It moved to GMA Network on December 18, 2010. The show concluded on July 9, 2011.

The show is streaming online on YouTube.

== Ratings ==
According to AGB Nielsen Philippines' Mega Manila People/Individual television ratings, the final episode of Misteryo scored a 4.7% rating.
