= Jollitown =

Philippine television infotainment show

- Title card in 2012
- Also known as: The Jollitown Kids Show
- Genre: Infotainment
- Country of origin: Philippines
- Original language: Tagalog
- No. of seasons: 6
- No. of episodes: 79

Production
- Production locations: Pasig, Philippines
- Camera setup: Multiple-camera setup
- Running time: 30 minutes
- Production company: Jollibee Foods Corporation

Original release
- Network: GMA Network (2008–10; 2013); ABS-CBN (2011–12)
- Release: April 13, 2008 – October 12, 2013

Jollitown is a Philippine television infotainment show broadcast by GMA Network and ABS-CBN. The series premiered on April 13, 2008 and concluded on October 12, 2013, with a total of six seasons and 79 episodes.

== Overview ==
The show was launched to promote Jollibee's 30th anniversary. It follows Jollibee and his friends–Yum the scientist, Twirlie the star performer, Hetty the cheerleader and Popo the gym coach through their adventures. The show left GMA Network on November 14, 2010, and moved to ABS-CBN, premiering its fourth season on July 17, 2011.

== Seasons ==
Season	Episodes	Originally released	
Season	Episodes	First released	Last released
1	14	April 13, 2008	July 20, 2008
2	13	April 19, 2009	July 12, 2009
3	13	August 22, 2010	November 14, 2010
4	13	July 17, 2011	October 9, 2011
5	13	July 22, 2012	October 14, 2012
6	13	July 20, 2013	October 12, 2013

== Ratings ==
According to AGB Nielsen Philippines' Mega Manila household television ratings, the second season premiere earned a 7.7% rating. The second season finale scored a 12.4% rating. The third season premiere achieved a 4.1% rating. The third season finale gathered a 4% rating.

The pilot episode of The Jollitown Kids Show earned a 10.8% rating. The final episode of The Jollitown Kids Show scored a 12.8% rating.

== Accolades ==
Accolades received by Jollitown
Year	Award	Category	Recipient	Result	Ref.
2009	Asia Pacific Tambuli Awards	Best Innovative and Integrated Campaign	Jollitown	Won	
2009	Araw Values Awards	Integrated Media Campaign	Jollitown	Won	
2014	28th PMPC Star Awards for Television	Best Children's Show	The Jollitown Kids Show	Nominated	
