= 25th PMPC Star Awards for Television =

Awards presented in Pasay, Manila, Philippines

- Date: November 22, 2011; November 27, 2011 (Delayed Telecast)
- Location: Newport Performing Arts Theater, Resorts World Manila, Pasay
- Hosted by: Piolo Pascual; Shamcey Supsup; Richard Gomez; Dawn Zulueta

Television/radio coverage
- Network: ABS-CBN
- Produced by: Airtime Marketing Philippines, Inc.

The 25th PMPC Star Awards for Television was held on Tuesday night, November 22, 2011, at Newport Performing Arts Theater, Resorts World Manila in Pasay, Manila and broadcast over ABS-CBN Channel 2 on November 27, 2011 (on Sunday's Best). The ceremony was hosted by Piolo Pascual, Shamcey Supsup, Richard Gomez and Dawn Zulueta and directed by Al Quinn. This is the Silver Anniversary of the TV award giving body with the theme of ”tribute to musical variety shows” (the past 25 years).

== Awards ==
These are the nominations for the 25th Star Awards. The winners are in bold at the top of each list.

Stations	Awards
ABS-CBN; Studio 23; ANC	26
TV5; Aksyon TV	6
GMA; GMA News TV	16
Net 25	2
UNTV	1
**TOTAL**	51

=== Best Educational Program ===
- **Matanglawin (ABS-CBN 2)**
- Aha! (GMA 7)
- Born to Be Wild (GMA 7)
- Quickfire (GMA News TV)
- Salamat Dok (ABS-CBN 2)

=== Best Educational Program Host ===
- **Kim Atienza - Matanglawin (ABS-CBN 2)**
- Drew Arellano - AHA! (GMA 7)
- Ramon "Bong" Revilla, Jr. - Kap's Amazing Stories (GMA 7)
- Kiko Rustia and Doc Ferds Recio - Born To Be Wild (GMA 7)
- Bernadette Sembrano - Salamat Dok! (ABS-CBN 2)

=== Best Travel Show ===
- **Trip na Trip (ABS-CBN 2)**
- Asenso Pinoy (NBN 4)
- Estranghero (UNTV 37)
- Landmarks (Net 25)
- Weekend Getaway (GMA News TV)

=== Best Travel Show Host ===
- **Kat de Castro, Jason Gainza, Franzen Fajardo, Kian Kazemi - Trip na Trip (ABS-CBN 2)**
- Francis Cardona - Asenso Pinoy (NBN 4)
- Faye de Castro - Landmarks (Net 25)
- Drew Arellano - Weekend Getaway (GMA News TV)
- Atty. Reggie Tungol, Atty. Wilhelm Soriano, Lyn Perez - Estranghero (UNTV 37)

=== Best Lifestyle Show ===
- **Us Girls (Studio 23)**
- Urban Zone (ABS-CBN 2)
- Fashbook (GMA News TV)
- CHInoyTV (Net 25)

=== Best Lifestyle Show Host ===
- **Angel Aquino, Iya Villania, Cheska Garcia-Kramer - Us Girls (Studio 23)**
- Willord Chua, Jayson Kiong, Dorenet Yu, Norman Ong, Shirley Chiu, *Sherine Koa, Katherine Ordonez - CHInoyTV (Net 25)
- Solenn Heussaff - Fashbook (GMA News TV)
- Daphne Oseña-Paez - Urban Zone (ABS-CBN 2)

=== Best Morning Show ===
- **Umagang Kay Ganda (ABS-CBN 2)**
- Unang Hirit (GMA 7)
- Good Morning Kuya (UNTV 37)
- Sapul sa Singko (TV 5)
- Homepage (Net 25)

=== Best Morning Show Host ===
- **Anthony Taberna, Bernadette Sembrano, Alex Santos, Iya Villania, Donita Rose, Winnie Cordero, Andrei Felix, Venus Raj - Umagang Kay Ganda (ABS-CBN 2)**
- Arnold Clavio, Rhea Santos, Suzie Entrata-Abrera, Lyn Ching, Connie Sison, Pia Arcangel, Susan Enriquez, Drew Arellano, Luane Dy, Monica Verallo - Unang Hirit (GMA 7)
- Daniel Razon, Rene Jose, Atty. Wilhelm Soriano, Nina Taduran, Lola Sela Bungangera, Beth Santiago, Lea Ylagan, Lyn Perez - Good Morning Kuya (UNTV 37)
- Erwin Tulfo, Martin Andanar, Lourd de Veyra, Shawn Yao, Atty. Mike Templo - Sapul (TV 5)
- Eunice Marino, Weng dela Fuente, Onin Miranda, Ellaine Fuentes - Homepage (Net 25)

=== Best Youth-Oriented Show ===
- **Reel Love Presents Tween Hearts (GMA 7)**
- Bagets: Just Got Lucky (TV 5)
- Good Vibes (ABS-CBN 2)

=== Best New Male TV Personality ===
- **Derick Monasterio - Reel Love Presents Tween Hearts (GMA 7)**
- **Teejay Marquez - Reel Love Presents Tween Hearts (GMA 7)**
- Diego Loyzaga - Mara Clara (ABS-CBN 2)
- Hiro Piralta - Reel Love Presents: Tween Hearts (GMA 7)
- Luigi Revilla - Koreana (GMA 7)
- Alden Richards - Alakdana (GMA 7)

=== Best New Female TV Personality ===
- **Jillian Ward - Trudis Liit (GMA 7)**
- Ritz Azul - Mga Nagbabagang Bulaklak (TV 5)
- Eula Caballero - Bagets (TV 5)
- Bianca Manalo - Juanita Banana (ABS-CBN 2)
- Mutya Orquia - Mutya (ABS-CBN 2)

=== Best Horror or Fantasy Program ===
- 'Spooky Nights Presents: Bampirella (GMA 7)
- Inday Wanda (TV 5)
- Midnight DJ (TV 5)
- Pidol's Wonderland (TV 5)
- Wansapanataym (ABS-CBN 2)

=== Best Public Affairs Program ===
- **The Bottomline with Boy Abunda (ABS-CBN 2)**
- Bawal Ang Pasaway Kay Mareng Winnie (GMA News TV)
- Brigada (GMA News TV)
- Dong Puno Kalibre 41'' (Aksyon TV)
- Pollwatch (UNTV 37)
- Power House (GMA News TV)

=== Best Public Affairs Program Host ===
- **Boy Abunda - Bottomline (ABS-CBN 2)**
- Atty. George Garcia, Jocos Castigador - Pollwatch (UNTV 37)
- Winnie Monsod - Bawal Ang Pasaway Kay Mareng Winnie (GMA News TV)
- Dong Puno - Dong Puno Kalibre 41 (Aksyon TV)
- Jessica Soho - Brigada (GMA News TV)
- Mel Tiangco - Power House (GMA News TV)

=== Best Magazine Show ===
- **Rated K (ABS-CBN 2)**
- Ang Pinaka (GMA News TV)
- Failon Ngayon (ABS-CBN 2)
- Kapuso Mo, Jessica Soho (GMA 7)
- Tribe (Net 25)

=== Best Magazine Show Host ===
- **Korina Sanchez - Rated K (ABS-CBN 2)**
- Ted Failon - Failon Ngayon (ABS-CBN 2)
- Rovilson Fernandez - Ang Pinaka (GMA News TV)
- Jessica Soho - Kapuso Mo, Jessica Soho (GMA 7)
- Christopher Wong, Nicole Facal - Tribe (Net 25)

=== Best Children Show ===
- **Art Angel (GMA 7)**
- I Got It! (ABS-CBN 2)
- Kawan Ng Cordero (UNTV 37)
- Tropang Potchi (GMA 7)

=== Best Children Show Host ===
- **Tonipet Gaba and Roxanne Barcelo - Art Angel (GMA 7)**
- Archie Alemania - I Got It! (ABS-CBN 2)
- Julian Trono, Ella Cruz, Sabrina Man, Gabriela Cruz, Bianca Umali - Tropang Potchi (GMA 7)
- Blanca Santiago, James Salamaca, Eric Cabobos - Kawan Ng Cordero (UNTV 37)

=== Best Documentary Program ===
- **i-Witness (GMA 7)**
- Journo (TV 5)
- Krusada (ABS-CBN 2)
- Reporter's Notebook (GMA 7)
- S.O.C.O.: Scene of the Crime Operatives (ABS-CBN 2)

=== Best Documentary Program Host ===
- **Kara David, Jay Taruc, Howie Severino, Sandra Aguinaldo - i-Witness (GMA 7)**
- Luchi Cruz-Valdes - Journo (TV 5)
- Karen Davila, Abner Mercado, Bernadette Sembrano - The Correspondents (ABS-CBN 2)
- Ces Oreña-Drilon - I Survived: Hindi Sumusuko Ang Pinoy (ABS-CBN 2)
- Maki Pulido, Jiggy Manicad - Reporter's Notebook (GMA 7)

=== Best Documentary Special ===
- **Pluma: Rizal, Ang Dakilang Manunulat (GMA News TV)**
- Anatomy of a Disaster (GMA 7)
- Banal (ABS-CBN 2)
- Climate Change (UNTV 37)
- EDSA: Sulyap sa Kasaysayan (ABS-CBN 2)

=== Best Public Service Program ===
- **Bitag (UNTV 37)**
- Imbestigador (GMA 7)
- Public Atorni (TV 5)
- Wish Ko Lang! (GMA 7)
- XXX: Exklusibong, Explosibong, Exposé (ABS-CBN 2)

=== Best Public Service Program Host ===
- **Atty. Persida Rueda-Acosta - Public Atorni: Asunto o Areglo (TV 5)**
- Mike Enriquez - Imbestigador (GMA 7)
- Vicky Morales - Wish Ko Lang (GMA 7)
- Ben Tulfo - Bitag (UNTV 37)
- Pinky Webb, Julius Babao, Anthony Taberna - XXX: Exklusibong, Explosibong, Exposé (ABS-CBN 2)

=== Best News Program ===
- **24 Oras (GMA 7)**
- TV Patrol (ABS-CBN 2)
- Saksi (GMA 7)
- Bandila (ABS-CBN 2)
- Balitanghali (GMA News TV)
- State of the Nation with Jessica Soho (GMA News TV)

=== Best Male Newscaster ===
- **Anthony Taberna - Iba-Balita ni Anthony Taberna (Studio 23)**
- Ted Failon - TV Patrol (ABS-CBN 2)
- Julius Babao - Bandila (ABS-CBN 2)
- Mike Enriquez - 24 Oras (GMA 7)
- Arnold Clavio - Saksi (GMA 7)
- Noli de Castro - TV Patrol (ABS-CBN 2)
- Howie Severino - News to Go (GMA News TV)
- Raffy Tima - Balitanghali (GMA News TV)

=== Best Female Newscaster ===
- **Vicky Morales - Saksi (GMA 7)**
- Ces Drilon - Bandila (ABS-CBN 2)
- Karen Davila - Bandila (ABS-CBN 2)
- Mel Tiangco - 24 Oras (GMA 7)
- Korina Sanchez - TV Patrol (ABS-CBN 2)
- Kara David - News to Go (GMA News TV)
- Pia Arcangel - Balitanghali (GMA News TV)
- Jessica Soho - State of the Nation with Jessica Soho (GMA News TV)

=== Best Talent Search Program ===
- **Showtime (ABS-CBN 2)**
- **Talentadong Pinoy (TV 5)**
- Star Circle Quest for the Next Kiddie Superstars (ABS-CBN 2)
- Star Power: Sharon's Search for the Next Female Pop Superstar (ABS-CBN 2)
- Danz Showdown (GMA 7)
- Star Factor (TV 5)

=== Best Talent Search Program Host ===
- **Luis Manzano and Billy Crawford - Pilipinas Got Talent (ABS-CBN 2)**
- Ryan Agoncillo - Talentadong Pinoy (TV 5)
- KC Concepcion - Star Circle Quest for the Next Kiddie Superstars (ABS-CBN 2)
- Sharon Cuneta - Star Power: Sharon's Search for the Next Female Pop Superstar (ABS-CBN 2)
- Anne Curtis, Vhong Navarro, Vice Ganda, Kim Atienza, Billy Crawford, Karylle, Jugs and Teddy - Showtime (ABS-CBN 2)

=== Best Game Show ===
- **Panahon Ko 'to!: Ang Game Show ng Buhay Ko (ABS-CBN 2)**
- Asar Talo Lahat Panalo! (GMA 7)
- Celebrity Cook-Off (TV 5)
- Lucky Numbers (TV 5)
- Twist and Shout (ABS-CBN 2)

=== Best Game Show Host ===
- Luis Manzano, Billy Crawford - Panahon Ko 'to!: Ang Game Show ng Buhay Ko (ABS-CBN 2)
- Ogie Alcasid, Michael V. - Hole In The Wall (GMA 7)
- Kris Aquino - The Price Is Right (ABS-CBN 2)
- Edu Manzano - Asar Talo Lahat Panalo (GMA 7)
- **Vic Sotto - Who Wants To Be A Millionaire (TV 5)**

=== Best Celebrity Talk Show ===
- **Moments (Net 25)**
- Love ni Mister, Love ni Misis (GMA 7)
- Simply KC (ABS-CBN 2)
- Spoon (Net 25)
- Tonight with Arnold Clavio (GMA News TV)

=== Best Celebrity Talk Show Host ===
- **Janice de Belen - Spoon (Net 25)**
- Arnold Clavio - Tonight with Arnold Clavio (GMA News TV)
- KC Concepcion - Simply KC (ABS-CBN 2)
- Gladys Reyes - Moments (Net 25)
- Carmina Villarroel, Zoren Legaspi - Love ni Mister, Love ni Misis (GMA 7)

=== Best Showbiz-Oriented Show ===
- **The Buzz (ABS-CBN 2)**
- Paparazzi (TV 5)
- Showbiz Central (GMA 7)
- SNN: Showbiz News Ngayon (ABS-CBN 2)
- Startalk (GMA 7)

=== Best Male Showbiz-Oriented Show Host ===
- **Luis Manzano - E-Live (ABS-CBN 2)**
- Joey de Leon - Startalk (GMA 7)
- Raymond Gutierrez - Showbiz Central (GMA 7)
- Ricky Lo - Startalk (GMA 7)
- Tim Yap - Tweetbiz (GMA News TV)

=== Best Female Showbiz-Oriented Show Host ===
- **Cristy Fermin - Paparazzi (TV 5)**
- Bianca Gonzales - SNN: Showbiz News Ngayon (ABS-CBN 2)
- Charlene Gonzales - The Buzz (ABS-CBN 2)
- Toni Gonzaga - The Buzz (ABS-CBN 2)
- Pia Guanio - Showbiz Central (GMA 7)

=== Best Gag Show ===
- **Bubble Gang (GMA 7)**
- Banana Split (ABS-CBN 2)
- Goin' Bulilit (ABS-CBN 2)
- Usapang Lalake (Studio 23)
- Wow, Me Ganon! (TV 5)
- Wow, Mali! (TV 5)

=== Best Variety Show ===
- **Willing Willie (TV5)**
- Comedy Bar (GMA 7)
- Happy Yipee Yehey! (ABS-CBN 2)
- Pilipinas Win Na Win (ABS-CBN 2)
- Shoutout! (ABS-CBN 2)

=== Best Musical Variety Show ===
- **ASAP Rocks (ABS-CBN 2)**
- Party Pilipinas (GMA 7)
- P.O.5 (TV 5)
- Sharon (ABS-CBN 2)
- Walang Tulugan with the Master Showman (GMA 7)

=== Best Male TV Host ===
- **Allan K. - Eat Bulaga! (GMA 7)**
- Joey de Leon - Eat Bulaga! (GMA 7)
- Luis Manzano - ASAP Rocks (ABS-CBN 2)
- Piolo Pascual - ASAP Rocks (ABS-CBN 2)
- Vic Sotto - Eat Bulaga! (GMA 7)

=== Best Female TV Host ===
- **Toni Gonzaga - ASAP Rocks (ABS-CBN 2)**
- Sharon Cuneta - Sharon (ABS-CBN 2)
- Eugene Domingo - Comedy Bar (GMA 7)
- Sarah Geronimo - ASAP Rocks (ABS-CBN 2)
- Regine Velasquez - Party Pilipinas (GMA 7)

=== Best Drama Mini-Series ===
- **Agimat: Mga Alamat Ni Ramon Revilla Presents Kapitan Inggo (ABS-CBN 2)**
- Love Bug Presents: The Last Romance (GMA 7)
- Your Song Presents: Iingatan Ka (ABS-CBN 2)

=== Best Daytime Drama Series ===
- **Little Star (GMA 7)**
- Alakdana (GMA 7)
- Koreana (GMA 7)
- Precious Hearts Romance Presents: Alyna (ABS-CBN 2)
- Precious Hearts Romance Presents: Impostor (ABS-CBN 2)

=== Best Comedy Show ===
- **Pepito Manaloto (GMA 7)**
- Iskul Bukol (TV 5)
- M3: Malay Mo Ma-develop (ABS-CBN 2)
- Mommy Elvie @ 18 (GMA News TV)
- Show Me Da Manny (GMA 7)

=== Best Comedy Actor ===
- **Ogie Alcasid - Bubble Gang (GMA 7)**
- Jason Gainza - Banana Split (ABS-CBN 2)
- Pooh- Banana Split (ABS-CBN 2)
- Michael V. - Bubble Gang (GMA 7)
- Ariel Villasanta - Mommy Elvie @ 18 (GMA News TV)

=== Best Comedy Actress ===
- **Ai-Ai de las Alas - M3: Malay Mo Ma-develop (ABS-CBN 2)**
- Angelica Panganiban - Banana Split (ABS-CBN 2)
- Rufa Mae Quinto - Bubble Gang (GMA 7)
- Pokwang - Banana Split (ABS-CBN 2)
- Mommy Elvie Villasanta - Mommy Elvie @ 18 (GMA News TV)

=== Best Drama Anthology ===
- **Untold Stories Mula sa Face to Face (TV 5)**
- Maynila (GMA 7)
- Star Confessions (TV 5)

=== Best Primetime TV Series ===
- **Minsan Lang Kita Iibigin (ABS-CBN 2)**
- Imortal (ABS-CBN 2)
- Ilumina (GMA 7)
- Magkaribal (ABS-CBN 2)
- Noah (ABS-CBN 2)

=== Best Single Performance by an Actor ===
- **Enchong Dee - "Parol" episode, Maalaala Mo Kaya (ABS-CBN 2)**
- John Arcilla - "Krus" episode, Maalaala Mo Kaya (ABS-CBN 2)
- JM de Guzman - "Pasaporte" episode, Maalaala Mo Kaya (ABS-CBN 2)
- Sid Lucero - "Pinwheel" episode, Maalaala Mo Kaya (ABS-CBN 2)
- Jay Manalo - "Wedding Ring" episode, Maalaala Mo Kaya (ABS-CBN 2)
- Coco Martin - "Silbato" episode, Maalaala Mo Kaya (ABS-CBN 2)
- Dominic Ochoa - "TV" episode, Maalaala Mo Kaya (ABS-CBN 2)

=== Best Single Performance by an Actress ===
- **Ai-Ai de las Alas - "Krus" episode, Maalaala Mo Kaya (ABS-CBN 2)**
- Alessandra De Rossi - "Pera" episode, Maalaala Mo Kaya (ABS-CBN 2)
- Helen Gamboa - "Parol" episode, Maalaala Mo Kaya (ABS-CBN 2)
- Rio Locsin - "Silbato" episode, Maalaala Mo Kaya (ABS-CBN 2)
- Aiko Melendez - "TV" episode, Maalaala Mo Kaya (ABS-CBN 2)
- Gina Pareño - "Manika" episode, Maalaala Mo Kaya (ABS-CBN 2)
- Snooky Serna - "Manika" episode, Maalaala Mo Kaya (ABS-CBN 2)

=== Best Drama Actor ===
- **Coco Martin - Minsan Lang Kita Iibigin (ABS-CBN 2)**
- John Lloyd Cruz - Imortal (ABS-CBN 2)
- Dingdong Dantes - Endless Love (GMA 7)
- Jhong Hilario - Mara Clara (ABS-CBN 2)
- Piolo Pascual - Noah (ABS-CBN 2)
- Derek Ramsay - Magkaribal (ABS-CBN 2)
- Jericho Rosales - Green Rose (ABS-CBN 2)

=== Best Drama Actress ===
- **Gretchen Barretto - Magkaribal (ABS-CBN 2)**
- Bea Alonzo - Magkaribal (ABS-CBN 2)
- Amy Austria-Ventura - Minsan Lang Kita Iibigin (ABS-CBN 2)
- Angel Aquino - Magkaribal (ABS-CBN 2)
- Anne Curtis - Green Rose (ABS-CBN 2)
- Angel Locsin - Imortal (ABS-CBN 2)
- Lorna Tolentino - Minsan Lang Kita Iibigin (ABS-CBN 2)

=== Best TV Station ===
- **ABS-CBN 2**
- AksyonTV
- ETC 9
- GMA 7
- GMA News TV 11
- IBC-13
- NBN-4
- Net 25
- Studio 23
- TV5
- UNTV 37

=== Sexiest Celebrity of the Night ===
- Male - Luis Manzano

=== Faces of the Night ===
- Male – Piolo Pascual
- Female – KC Concepcion

=== Stars of the Night ===
- Male – Coco Martin
- Female – Toni Gonzaga

== Special Awardees ==
- Nora Aunor: Longest Running Musical Variety Show in Philippine Television History (Superstar)
- German Moreno: Master Star Builder
- Boy Abunda: Hall of Fame as Best Male Showbiz-Oriented Show Host (ABS-CBN)
- Maalaala Mo Kaya: Hall of Fame as Best Drama Anthology (ABS-CBN)
- Susan Roces: Ading Fernando Lifetime Achievement Award
- Jessica Soho: Excellence in Broadcasting Lifetime Achievement Award
