= 27th PMPC Star Awards for Television =

- Date: November 24, 2013; December 1, 2013 (Delayed Telecast)
- Location: AFP Theater, Camp Aguinaldo, Quezon City
- Hosted by: Alex Gonzaga; Toni Gonzaga; Raymond Gutierrez; Richard Gutierrez

Television/radio coverage
- Network: ABS-CBN
- Produced by: Airtime Marketing Philippines, Inc.

The 27th PMPC Star Awards for Television ceremony was held at the AFP Theater in Camp Aguinaldo, Quezon City on November 24, 2013, and broadcast over ABS-CBN Channel 2 on December 1, 2013 (on Sunday's Best). The ceremony was hosted by Alex and Toni Gonzaga, Raymond and Richard Gutierrez and directed by Al Quinn. The theme is in coincidence with the Philippine Television's 60th anniversary.

== Nominees and winners ==
These are the nominations for the 27th Star Awards for Television. The winners are in bold.

Network	Total # of Nominees
ABS-CBN	139
PTV	4
TV5/AksyonTV	47
GMA/GMA News TV	119
ETC	1
IBC	1
Studio 23	2
Net 25	17
UNTV	12

Network	Total # of Winners (including Special Awards)
ABS-CBN	34
PTV	1
TV5	3
GMA	20
ETC	1
GMA News TV	4
Net 25	1

=== Best TV station ===
- **ABS-CBN-2**
- PTV-4
- TV5
- **GMA-7**
- RPN-9
- GMA News TV-11
- IBC-13
- SBN-21
- Studio 23
- Net 25
- RJTV-29
- BEAM-31
- UNTV-37
- AksyonTV-41*

=== Best Primetime Drama Series ===
- Apoy Sa Dagat (ABS-CBN 2)
- Huwag Ka Lang Mawawala (ABS-CBN 2)
- Ina, Kapatid, Anak (ABS-CBN 2)
- Indio (GMA-7)
- **Juan dela Cruz (ABS-CBN 2)**
- My Husband's Lover (GMA-7)
- Pahiram ng Sandali (GMA-7)

=== Best Daytime Drama Series ===
- **Be Careful with My Heart (ABS-CBN 2)**
- Dugong Buhay (ABS-CBN 2)
- Kakambal ni Eliana (GMA-7)
- Kung Ako'y Iiwan Mo (ABS-CBN 2)
- May Isang Pangarap (ABS-CBN 2)
- Mga Basang Sisiw (GMA-7)
- My Little Juan (ABS-CBN 2)

=== Best Drama Actor ===
- Bong Revilla (Indio; GMA-7)
- **Coco Martin (Juan dela Cruz; ABS-CBN 2)**
- Dennis Trillo (My Husband's Lover; GMA-7)
- John Lloyd Cruz (A Beautiful Affair; ABS-CBN 2)
- Piolo Pascual (Apoy sa Dagat; ABS-CBN 2)
- **Richard Yap (Be Careful with My Heart; ABS-CBN 2)**
- Tom Rodriguez (My Husband's Lover; GMA-7)

=== Best Drama Actress ===
- Carla Abellana (My Husband's Lover; GMA-7)
- Janice De Belen (Ina, Kapatid, Anak; ABS-CBN 2)
- Jodi Sta. Maria (Be Careful with My Heart; ABS-CBN 2)
- Judy Ann Santos (Huwag Ka Lang Mawawala; ABS-CBN 2)
- Kim Chiu (Ina, Kapatid, Anak; ABS-CBN 2)
- Maja Salvador (Ina, Kapatid, Anak; ABS-CBN 2)
- **Marian Rivera (Temptation of Wife; GMA-7)**
- Nora Aunor (Never Say Goodbye; TV5)

=== Best Drama Supporting Actor ===
- **Arjo Atayde (Dugong Buhay; ABS-CBN 2)**
- **Arron Villaflor (Juan dela Cruz; ABS-CBN 2)**
- Carlo Aquino (Annaliza; ABS-CBN 2)
- Pen Medina (Bayan Ko; GMA News TV)
- Roi Vinzon (My Husband's Lover; GMA-7)
- Ronaldo Valdez (Ina, Kapatid, Anak; ABS-CBN 2)
- Tirso Cruz III (Huwag Ka Lang Mawawala; ABS-CBN 2)

=== Best Drama Supporting Actress ===
- Amy Austria (Lorenzo's Time; ABS-CBN 2)
- Angel Aquino (Apoy Sa Dagat; ABS-CBN 2)
- Gina Pareño (Juan dela Cruz; ABS-CBN 2)
- Glydel Mercado (My Husband's Lover; GMA-7)
- **KC Concepcion (Huwag Ka Lang Mawawala; ABS-CBN 2)**
- Susan Roces (Walang Hanggan; ABS-CBN 2)
- Sylvia Sanchez (Be Careful with My Heart; ABS-CBN 2)

=== Best Drama Anthology ===
- **Magpakailanman (GMA-7)**
- Maynila (GMA-7)
- Untold Stories (TV5)
- Wagas (GMA News TV)

=== Best Single Performance by an Actress ===
- Ai-Ai de las Alas (MMK: Kulungan; ABS-CBN 2)
- Boots Anson-Roa (MMK: Kamison; ABS-CBN 2)
- Iza Calzado (MMK: Ilog; ABS-CBN 2)
- Jane Oineza (MMK: Bimpo; ABS-CBN 2)
- Krystal Reyes (Magpakailanman Presents "Batang Ina: The Tintin Ng Story"; GMA-7)
- **Nikki Gil (MMK: Ilog; ABS-CBN 2)**
- Nora Aunor (Untold Stories: Tukso ng Pag-Ibig; TV5)

=== Best Single Performance by an Actor ===
- Baron Geisler (Untold Stories: Walang Hadlang ang Bukas; TV5)
- BJ Forbes (MMK: Bulaklak; ABS-CBN 2)
- **Carlo Aquino (MMK: Pulang Laso; ABS-CBN 2)**
- Joem Bascon (MMK: Pulang Laso; ABS-CBN 2)
- Keempee de Leon (Magpakailanman Presents "Ang Tatay Kong Beki: The Ruben Marasigan Story"; GMA-7)
- Romnick Sarmenta (MMK: Rosaryo; ABS-CBN 2)
- Zaijan Jaranilla (MMK: Rosaryo; ABS-CBN 2)

=== Best Child Performer ===
- **Andrea Brillantes (Annaliza; ABS CBN 2)**
- Izzy Canillo (My Little Juan; ABS-CBN 2)
- JB Agustin (Little Champ; ABS-CBN 2)
- Jillian Ward (Home Sweet Home; GMA-7)
- Louise Abuel (Juan dela Cruz; ABS-CBN 2)
- Xyriel Manabat (Kailangan Ko'y Ikaw; ABS-CBN 2)
- Zaijan Jaranilla (Lorenzo's Time; ABS-CBN 2)

=== Best New Male TV Personality ===
- Akihiro Blanco (Istorifik: Pidol's Kwentong Fantastik Presents Robin Dude;TV5)
- JB Agustin (Little Champ; ABS-CBN 2)
- Jerome Ponce (Be Careful with My Heart; ABS-CBN 2)
- Junjun Quintana (Tanikala: Liwanag Sa Dapithapon; GMA News TV)
- Mikoy Morales (Teen Gen; GMA-7)
- **Ruru Madrid (Maynila: Faith in Love; GMA-7)**
- Vin Abrenica (Never Say Goodbye; TV5)

=== Best New Female TV Personality ===
- Aaliyah Belmoro (Goin’ Bulilit; ABS-CBN 2)
- Ashley Sarmiento (Goin’ Bulilit; ABS-CBN 2)
- Gianna Revilla (Teen Gen; GMA-7)
- **Janella Salvador (Be Careful with My Heart; ABS-CBN 2)**
- Liza Soberano (Kung Ako'y Iiwan Mo; ABS-CBN 2)
- Sophie Albert (Never Say Goodbye; TV5)
- Thea Tolentino (Teen Gen; GMA-7)

=== Best Gag Show ===
- Banana Nite (ABS-CBN 2)
- **Banana Split: Extra Scoop (ABS-CBN 2)**
- **Bubble Gang (GMA-7)**
- Gag U (Studio 23)
- Goin' Bulilit (ABS-CBN 2)
- Lokomoko U (TV5)

=== Best Comedy Show ===
- **Pepito Manaloto: Ang Tunay na Kwento (GMA-7)**
- Toda Max (ABS-CBN 2)
- Vampire Ang Daddy Ko (GMA-7)

=== Best Comedy Actor ===
- Jayson Gainza (Banana Nite; ABS-CBN 2)
- **Michael V. (Bubble Gang; GMA-7)**
- Ogie Alcasid (Bubble Gang; GMA-7)
- Pooh (Banana Split: Extra Scoop; ABS-CBN 2)
- Robin Padilla (Toda Max; ABS-CBN 2)
- Vhong Navarro (Toda Max; ABS-CBN 2)
- Vic Sotto (Vampire ang Daddy Ko; GMA-7)

=== Best Comedy Actress ===
- Alex Gonzaga (Banana Nite; ABS-CBN 2)
- Angel Locsin (Toda Max; ABS-CBN 2)
- Angelica Panganiban (Banana Split: Extra Scoop; ABS-CBN 2)
- Manilyn Reynes (Pepito Manoloto; GMA-7)
- Pokwang (Toda Max; ABS-CBN 2)
- **Rufa Mae Quinto (Bubble Gang; GMA-7)**
- Ryzza Mae Dizon (Vampire Ang Daddy Ko; GMA-7)

=== Best Musical Variety Show ===
- **ASAP 18 (ABS-CBN 2)**
- Party Pilipinas (GMA-7)
- Sarah G. Live (ABS-CBN 2)
- Sessions on 25th Street (Net 25)
- Sunday All Stars (GMA-7)
- Walang Tulugan with the Master Showman (GMA-7)

=== Best Variety Show ===
- **It's Showtime (ABS-CBN 2)**
- Wil Time Bigtime (TV5)
- Wowowillie (TV5)

=== Best Female TV Host ===
- **Anne Curtis (It's Showtime; ABS-CBN 2)**
- Julia Clarete (Eat Bulaga; GMA-7)
- Karylle (It's Showtime; ABS-CBN 2)
- Mariel Rodriguez (Wowowillie; TV5)
- Pauleen Luna (Eat Bulaga; GMA-7)
- Sarah Geronimo (Sarah G. Live!; ABS-CBN 2)
- Toni Gonzaga (ASAP 18; ABS-CBN 2)

=== Best Male TV Host ===
- Allan K (Eat Bulaga; GMA 7)
- **Billy Crawford (It's Showtime; ABS-CBN 2)**
- Luis Manzano (ASAP 18; ABS-CBN 2)
- Piolo Pascual (ASAP 18; ABS-CBN 2)
- Vhong Navarro (It's Showtime; ABS-CBN 2)
- Vic Sotto (Eat Bulaga; GMA 7)
- Vice Ganda (It's Showtime; ABS-CBN 2)

=== Best Public Service Program ===
- Buhay OFW (Aksyon TV)
- Failon Ngayon (ABS-CBN 2)
- **Imbestigador (GMA-7)**
- Pinoy True Stories: Bistado (ABS-CBN 2)
- Rescue (GMA 7)
- Wish Ko Lang (GMA-7)
- Reunions (GMA News TV)
- XXX: Exklusibong, Explosibong, Exposé (ABS-CBN 2)

=== Best Public Service Program Host ===
- Arnold Clavio (Rescue; GMA-7)
- Julius Babao, Pinky Webb, Anthony Taberna (XXX: Exklusibong Explosibong Exposé; ABS-CBN 2)
- Julius Babao (Pinoy True Stories: Bistado; ABS-CBN 2)
- Jessica Soho (Reunions; GMA News TV)
- Karen Davila (Pinoy True Stories: Engkuwentro; ABS-CBN)
- Mike Enriquez (Imbestigador; GMA-7)
- Ted Failon (Failon Ngayon; ABS-CBN 2)
- **Vicky Morales (Wish Ko Lang; GMA-7)**

=== Best Horror-Fantasy Program ===
- Istorifik: Pidol's Kwentong Fantastik (TV5)
- One Day, Isang Araw (GMA-7)
- Pidol's Wonderland (TV5)
- Third Eye (TV5)
- **Wansapanataym (ABS-CBN 2)**

=== Best Reality Competition Program ===
- Boracay Bodies (TV5)
- **Extra Challenge (GMA-7)**
- Karinderya Wars; (TV5)
- Protégé: The Battle For The Big Artista Break (GMA-7)

=== Best Reality Competition Program Host ===
- Dingdong Dantes, Jennylyn Mercado, Carla Abellana, Maxene Magalona (Protégé: The Battle For The Big Artista Break; GMA-7)
- **Judy Ann Santos-Agoncillo (MasterChef Pinoy Edition; ABS-CBN 2)**
- Marian Rivera, Richard Gutierrez, Norman "Boobay" Balbuena (Extra Challenge; GMA 7)
- Marvin Agustin (Karinderia Wars; TV5)
- Phoemela Baranda (Boracay Bodies; TV5)

=== Best Game Show ===
- Bonakid Pre-School: Ready, Set, Laban! (GMA-7)
- **Celebrity Bluff (GMA-7)**
- Game 'N Go (TV5)
- Jeepney Jackpot: Pera o Para! (TV5)
- Manny Many Prizes (GMA-7)
- Show Up: Ang Bagong Game Show ng Bayan (PTV-4)

=== Best Game Show Host ===
- Edu Manzano, Joey De Leon, Arnell Ignacio, Gelli De Belen, Shalani Soledad-Romulo, Daniel Matsunaga, Monika Sta. Maria, Jeffrey "Mr. Fu" Espiritu (Game ‘N Go; TV5)
- Eugene Domingo, Jose Manalo, Wally Bayola (Celebrity Bluff; GMA-7)
- **Luis Manzano (Kapamilya: Deal or No Deal; ABS-CBN 2)**
- Manny Pacquiao, Rhian Ramos, Isabelle Daza, Gladys Guevarra, Paolo Contis, Benjie Paras, Onyok Velasco, Mike "Pekto" Nacua, John Feir, Moymoy and Roadfill, Via Antonio (Manny Many Prizes; GMA 7
- Jeffrey "Mr. Fu" Espiritu, Valeen Montenegro, Saida Diola, Alison Andres (Jeepney Jackpot, Pera o Para; TV5)
- Ogie Alcasid (Bonakid Pre-School: Ready, Set, Laban!; GMA-7)
- Vic Sotto (Who Wants to Be a Millionaire?; TV-5)

=== Best Talent Search Program ===
- Artista Academy (TV5)
- Promil Pre-School i-Shine Talent Camp (ABS-CBN 2)
- Kanta Pilipinas (TV5)
- Talentadong Pinoy Junior (TV5)
- **Talentadong Pinoy Worldwide (TV5)**

=== Best Talent Search Program Host ===
- Billy Crawford, Luis Manzano (Pilipinas Got Talent Season 4; ABS-CBN 2)
- Cesar Montano, Marvin Agustin (Artista Academy; TV5)
- KC Concepcion (The X Factor Philippines; ABS-CBN 2)
- Rico Blanco (Kanta Pilipinas; TV5)
- Ryan Agoncillo (Talentadong Pinoy Junior; TV5)
- **Toni Gonzaga, Alex Gonzaga, Robi Domingo (The Voice of the Philippines; ABS-CBN 2)**
- Xian Lim, Matteo Guidicelli, Dimples Romana (Promil Pre-School i-Shine Talent Camp; ABS-CBN 2)

=== Best Youth Oriented Program ===
- **Luv U (ABS CBN 2)**
- Teen Gen (GMA 7)

=== Best Educational Program ===
- **Born to Be Wild (GMA-7)**
- Chef Boy Logro: Kusina Master (GMA-7)
- Kabuhayang Swak na Swak (ABS-CBN 2)
- Matanglawin (ABS-CBN 2)
- My Puhunan (ABS-CBN 2)
- Pinoy Explorer (TV5)
- Salamat Dok! (ABS-CBN 2)

=== Best Educational Program Host ===
- Aga Muhlach (Pinoy Explorer; TV5)
- Bernadette Sembrano, Alvin Elchico, Jing Castañeda (Salamat Dok; ABS-CBN 2)
- Bong Revilla (Kap's Amazing Stories; GMA-7)
- Doc Nielsen Donato, Doc Ferdz Recio (Born to Be Wild; GMA-7)
- Drew Arellano, Norman "Boobay" Balbuena, Patani Daño, Maey Bautista, Betong Sumaya (Aha; GMA-7)
- Karen Davila (My Puhunan; ABS-CBN 2)
- **Kim Atienza (Matanglawin; ABS-CBN 2)**

=== Best Celebrity Talk Show ===
- Gandang Gabi, Vice! (ABS-CBN 2)
- **Kris TV (ABS-CBN 2)**
- Martin Late @ Night (ABS-CBN 2)
- Moments (Net 25)
- Sarap Diva (GMA-7)
- Spoon (Net 25)
- The Ryzza Mae Show (GMA-7)

=== Best Celebrity Talk Show Host ===
- Gladys Reyes (Moments; Net 25)
- Janice De Belen (Spoon; Net 25)
- Kris Aquino (Kris TV; ABS-CBN 2)
- Martin Nievera (Martin Late @ Night; ABS-CBN 2)
- Regine Velasquez (Sarap Diva; GMA-7)
- Ryzza Mae Dizon (The Ryzza Mae Show; GMA-7)
- **Vice Ganda (Gandang Gabi Vice;ABS-CBN 2)**

=== Best Documentary Program ===
- Balwarte (TV 5)
- Investigative Documentaries (GMA News TV)
- **i-Witness (GMA-7)**
- Krusada (ABS-CBN 2)
- Patrol ng Pilipino (ABS-CBN 2)
- Reporter's Notebook (GMA-7)
- S.O.C.O. (Scene of the Crime Operatives) (ABS-CBN 2)

=== Best Documentary Program Host ===
- Atom Araullo (Pinoy True Stories: Hiwaga; ABS-CBN 2)
- Gus Abelgas (S.O.C.O.; ABS-CBN 2)
- Jiggy Manicad, Maki Pulido (Reporter's Notebook; GMA-7)
- **Kara David, Sandra Aguinaldo, Howie Severino, Jay Taruc (i-Witness; GMA-7)**
- Luchi Cruz-Valdes, Erwin Tulfo, Paolo Bediones, Cheryl Cosim, Lourd De Veyra, Cheri Mercado, Raffy Tulfo, Jove Francisco, Roby Alampay, Martin Andanar, Ed Lingao (Balwarte; TV5)
- Malou Mangahas (Investigative Documentaries; GMA News TV)
- Rhea Santos (Tunay Na Buhay; GMA-7)

=== Best Documentary Special ===
- Agosto Beinte-Uno (ABS-CBN 2)
- **Kabayan Reports: Gusto Kong Mag-Aral (ABS-CBN 2)**
- Johnny (ABS-CBN 2)
- Landas (GMA-7)
- San Pedro Calungsod (ABS-CBN 2)
- Takutan Tayo, Kaya Mo? (ABS-CBN 2)

=== Best Magazine Show ===
- Ako ang Simula (ABS-CBN 2)
- Brigada (GMA News TV)
- Good News Kasama si Vicky Morales (GMA News TV)
- **I Juander (GMA News TV)**
- Kapuso Mo, Jessica Soho (GMA-7)
- Rated K (ABS-CBN 2)
- Sports Unlimited (ABS-CBN 2)

=== Best Magazine Show Host ===
- Anthony Taberna, Karen Davila, Atty. Pochoy Labog (Ako ang Simula; ABS-CBN 2)
- Dyan Castillejo, Marc Nelson (Sports Unlimited; ABS-CBN 2)
- **Jessica Soho (Kapuso Mo, Jessica Soho; GMA-7)**
- Korina Sanchez (Rated K; ABS-CBN 2)
- Regine Velasquez, Raymond Gutierrez, Jennylyn Mercado, Roderick Paulate (HOT TV: Hindi Ordinaryong Tsismis; GMA-7)
- Susan Enriquez, Cesar Apolinario (I Juander; GMA News TV)
- Vicky Morales, Bea Binene (Good News; GMA News TV)

=== Best News Program ===
- 24 Oras (GMA-7)
- Aksyon (TV5)
- Balitanghali (GMA News TV)
- Bandila (ABS-CBN 2)
- News to Go (GMA News TV)
- Saksi (GMA-7)
- **State of the Nation with Jessica Soho (GMA News TV)**
- TV Patrol (ABS-CBN 2)

=== Best Male Newscaster ===
- **Julius Babao (Bandila; ABS-CBN 2)**
- Noli de Castro (TV Patrol; ABS-CBN 2)
- Atty. Marc Castrodes (News @ 6; PTV-4)
- Mike Enriquez (24 Oras; GMA-7)
- Ted Failon (TV Patrol; ABS-CBN 2)
- Jiggy Manicad (News TV Quick Response Team; GMA News TV)
- Ralph Obina (News @ 6; PTV-4)
- Howie Severino (News to Go; GMA News TV)
- Robert Tan (NewsLife; PTV-4)
- Raffy Tima (Balitanghali; GMA News TV)

=== Best Female Newscaster ===
- Isabella Cantu (NewsLife; PTV-4)
- Ces Drilon (Bandila; ABS-CBN 2)
- Kara David (News to Go; GMA News TV)
- **Karen Davila (Bandila; ABS-CBN 2)**
- Kathy San Gabriel (News @ 6;, PTV-4)
- Korina Sanchez (TV Patrol; ABS-CBN 2)
- Jessica Soho (State of the Nation with Jessica Soho; GMA News TV)
- Mel Tiangco (24 Oras; GMA-7)
- Cathy Untalan-Vital (NewsLife; PTV-4)
- Vicky Morales (Saksi; GMA-7)

=== Best Morning Show ===
- Good Morning Boss (PTV-4)
- Good Morning Club (TV5)
- Good Morning Kuya (UNTV 37)
- Homepage (Net 25)
- Kape at Balita (GMA News TV)
- **Umagang Kay Ganda (ABS-CBN 2)**
- Unang Hirit (GMA-7)

=== Best Morning Show Host ===
- Anthony Taberna, Bernadette Sembrano, Jorge Cariño, Winnie Cordero, Bianca Gonzalez, Ariel Ureta, Atom Araullo, Zen Hernandez, Venus Raj, Andrei Felix, Doris Bigornia, TJ Manotoc, MJ Felipe, Alex Santos (Umagang Kay Ganda; ABS-CBN 2)
- **Arnold Clavio, Rhea Santos, Lyn Ching-Pascual, Suzi Entrata-Abrera, Danilo Federez (voice of Arn-Arn), Lhar Santiago, Love Añover, Atty. Gaby Concepcion, Drew Arellano, Mareng Winnie Monsod, Pia Arcangel, Luane Dy, Connie Sison, Monica Verallo, Nathaniel "Mang Tani" Cruz, Tonipet Gaba, Susan Enriquez, Ivan Mayrina (Unang Hirit; GMA-7)**
- Cheryl Cosim, Martin Andanar, Grace Lee, Tintin Bersola-Babao, Erwin Tulfo, Twink Macaraig, Tuesday Vargas, Ina Zara, Edu Manzano, Amy Perez (Good Morning Club; TV5)
- Daniel Razon, Angela Lagunzad, Erin Tanada, Atty. Regie Tongol, Diego Castro, Rheena Villamor, Dr. Sarah Barba, Dr. Janice Ann Espino-De Vera (Good Morning Kuya; UNTV 37)
- Dianne Medina, Sandro Hermoso, Carla Lizardo, JC Tejano (Good Morning Boss; PTV-4)
- Susan Enriquez, Joel Reyes Zobel, Michael Fajatin, Mariz Umali, Valerie Tan (Kape at Balita; GMA News TV)
- Weng Dela Fuente, Nelson Lubao, James Manzanero, Doren Manzanero, Sarah Quiambao (Homepage; Net 25)

=== Best Public Affairs Program ===
- Adyenda (GMA News TV)
- Bawal ang Pasaway kay Mareng Winnie (GMA News TV)
- Face to Face (TV5)
- Get It Straight (UNTV 37)
- I-Balita Online (Net 25)
- Law Profile (UNTV 37)
- Personalan: Ang Unang Hakbang (GMA News TV)
- **The Bottomline with Boy Abunda (ABS-CBN 2)**

=== Best Public Affairs Program Host ===
- Amy Perez, Gelli De Belen (Face to Face; TV5)
- Arlyn Dela Cruz (I-Balita Online; Net 25)
- **Boy Abunda (The Bottomline with Boy Abunda; ABS-CBN 2)**
- Daniel Razon (Get It Straight; UNTV 37)
- Sec. Joel Villanueva (Adyenda; GMA News TV)
- Jolina Magdangal-Escueta, Jean Garcia (Personalan: Ang Unang Hakbang; GMA News TV)
- Ellaine Fuentes (Aprub: Gawin Natin 'To!; Net 25)

=== Best Showbiz Oriented Talk Show ===
- Ang Latest (TV5)
- Showbiz Inside Report (ABS-CBN 2)
- **Startalk (GMA-7)**
- The Buzz (ABS-CBN 2)

=== Best Male Showbiz Oriented Talk Show Host ===
- Butch Francisco (Startalk; GMA-7)
- Joey de Leon (Startalk; GMA-7)
- Joey Marquez (Showbiz Inside Report; ABS-CBN 2)
- Jose Javier Reyes (Ang Latest; TV5)
- Jeffrey "Mr. Fu" Espiritu (Ang Latest; TV5)
- **Ogie Diaz (Showbiz Inside Report; ABS-CBN 2)**
- Ricky Lo (Startalk; GMA-7)

=== Best Female Showbiz Oriented Talk Show Host ===
- Carmina Villarroel (Showbiz Inside Report; ABS-CBN 2)
- Charlene Gonzales (The Buzz; ABS-CBN 2)
- **Cristy Fermin (Ang Latest; TV5)**
- Janice de Belen (Showbiz Inside Report; ABS-CBN 2)
- Lolit Solis (Startalk; GMA-7)
- Lucy Torres-Gomez (Ang Latest; TV5)
- Toni Gonzaga (The Buzz; ABS-CBN 2)

=== Best Children Show ===
- **Batibot (TV5)**
- The KNC Show (Kawan ng Cordero) (UNTV 37)
- Tropang Potchi (GMA-7)

=== Best Children Show Host ===
- Kakki Teodoro, Abner Delina (Batibot; TV5)
- Eric Cabobos, Bency Vallo, Cedie Isip, Moonlight Alarcon, Tim Argallon, Cid Capulong, Kim Enriquez, Kyla Manarang (The KNC Show; UNTV 37)
- **Sabrina Man, Miggy Jimenez, Lianne Valentino, Isabel "Lenlen" Frial, Nomer Limatog, Miggs Cuaderno, Kyle Danielle Ocampo, Potchi Mascot (Tropang Potchi; GMA-7)**

=== Best Travel Show ===
- **Biyahe ni Drew (GMA News TV)**
- Bread N' Butter (UNTV 37)
- Landmarks (Net 25)
- Pinoy Adventures (GMA-7)

=== Best Travel Show Host ===
- Arlene Razon, Kitt Meily, Rodel Flordeliz (Bread N' Butter; UNTV 37)
- Drew Arellano (Biyahe ni Drew; GMA News TV)
- Faye De Castro-Umandal (Landmarks; Net 25)
- **Richard Gutierrez (Pinoy Adventures; GMA-7)**

=== Best Lifestyle Show ===
- **Convergence (Net 25)**
- Cook Eat Right (UNTV 37)
- Fashbook (GMA News TV)

=== Best Lifestyle Show Host ===
- Chef Reg Baron Saguin, Chef Ricardio Cepeda, Chef Mikeli O’ Leary (Cook Eat Right; UNTV 37)
- Nikki Veron Cruz, Kyle Nofuente, Christopher Wong (Convergence; Net 25)
- **Solenn Heussaff (Fashbook; GMA News TV)**

== Special awards ==
=== Ading Fernando Lifetime Achievement Awardee ===
- Kitchie Benedicto-Paulino

=== Excellence in Broadcasting Awardee ===
- Rey Langit

=== Special Citation ===
- German Moreno

=== Stars of the Night ===
- Coco Martin (Male)
- Kim Chiu (Female)

== See also ==
- PMPC Star Awards for TV
