= 26th PMPC Star Awards for Television =

- Date: November 18, 2012; November 25, 2012 (Delayed Telecast)
- Location: Henry Lee Irwin Theater, Ateneo de Manila University, Quezon City
- Hosted by: Aga Muhlach; Kris Aquino; Toni Gonzaga

Television/radio coverage
- Network: ABS-CBN
- Produced by: Airtime Marketing Philippines, Inc.

The 26th PMPC Star Awards for Television ceremony was held at the Henry Lee Irwin Theater in Ateneo de Manila University, Quezon City on November 18, 2012 and broadcast over ABS-CBN Channel 2 on November 25, 2012 (on Sunday's Best). The ceremony was hosted by Aga Muhlach, Kris Aquino and Toni Gonzaga and directed by Al Quinn.

== Nominees and winners ==
These are the nominations for the 26th Star Awards for Television. The winners are in bold.

Network	Total # of nominees
ABS-CBN	114
PTV	4
TV5	42
GMA	77
RPN	1
GMA News TV	22
IBC	5
Studio 23	5
Net 25	13
UNTV	7
AksyonTV	2

Network	Total # of winners (including special awards)
ABS-CBN	30
TV5	5
GMA	9
Net 25	1

=== Best TV station ===
- **ABS-CBN-2**
- PTV-4
- TV5
- GMA-7
- RPN-9
- GMA News TV-11
- IBC-13
- Studio 23
- Net 25
- UNTV-37
- AksyonTV-41

=== Best Drama Series ===
- 100 Days to Heaven (ABS-CBN 2)
- **Amaya (GMA 7)**
- Budoy (ABS-CBN 2)
- Dahil Sa Pag-ibig (ABS-CBN 2)
- Munting Heredera (GMA 7)
- Sa Ngalan ng Ina (TV5)
- Walang Hanggan (ABS-CBN 2)

=== Best Drama Actor ===
- Gerald Anderson (Budoy / ABS-CBN 2)
- Dingdong Dantes (My Beloved / GMA 7)
- Eddie Garcia (Babaeng Hampaslupa / TV5)
- Richard Gomez (Walang Hanggan / ABS-CBN 2)
- Coco Martin (Walang Hanggan / ABS-CBN 2)
- Piolo Pascual (Dahil Sa Pag-ibig / ABS-CBN 2)
- **Jericho Rosales (Dahil Sa Pag-ibig (ABS-CBN 2)**

=== Best Drama Actress ===
- **Nora Aunor (Sa Ngalan Ng Ina / TV5)**
- Janice de Belen (Budoy / ABS-CBN 2)
- **Helen Gamboa (Walang Hanggan / ABS-CBN 2)**
- Xyriel Manabat (100 Days to Heaven / ABS-CBN 2)
- Rochelle Pangilinan (Amaya / GMA 7)
- Susan Roces (Walang Hanggan / ABS-CBN 2)
- Dawn Zulueta (Walang Hanggan / ABS-CBN 2)

=== Best Drama Anthology ===
- Maynila (GMA 7)
- Real Confessions (TV5)
- Star Confessions (TV5)
- **Untold Stories (TV5)**

=== Best Single Performance by an Actress ===
- Angel Aquino (Maalaala Mo Kaya: Manika / ABS-CBN 2)
- Iza Calzado (Maalaala Mo Kaya: Cross Stitch / ABS-CBN 2)
- Brenna Garcia (Maalaala Mo Kaya: Cards / ABS-CBN 2)
- Jane Oineza (Maalaala Mo Kaya: Manika / ABS-CBN 2)
- Gina Pareño (Maalaala Mo Kaya: Sapatos / ABS-CBN 2)
- **Sylvia Sanchez (Maalaala Mo Kaya: Aswang / ABS-CBN 2)**
- Maricel Soriano (Untold Stories: Baldadong Puso / TV5)

=== Best Single Performance by an Actor ===
- Gerald Anderson (Maalaala Mo Kaya: Jacket / ABS-CBN 2)
- Arjo Atayde (Maalaala Mo Kaya: Bangka / ABS-CBN 2)
- **Noni Buencamino (Maalaala Mo Kaya: Sapatos / ABS-CBN 2)**
- JM de Guzman (Maalaala Mo Kaya: Balot / ABS-CBN 2)
- Robin Padilla (Maalaala Mo Kaya: Kuweba / ABS-CBN 2)
- Piolo Pascual (Maalaala Mo Kaya: Traysikel / ABS-CBN 2)
- Phillip Salvador (Maalaala Mo Kaya: Ensaymada / ABS-CBN 2)

=== Best Child Performer ===
- Louise Abuel (100 Days To Heaven / ABS-CBN 2)
- Bugoy Cariño (E-Boy / ABS-CBN 2)
- Zaijian Jaranilla (Ikaw ang Pag-ibig / ABS-CBN 2)
- **Xyriel Manabat (100 Days To Heaven / ABS-CBN 2)**
- Mona Louise Rey (Munting Heredera / GMA 7)
- Yogo Singh (Walang Hanggan / ABS-CBN 2)
- Jillian Ward (Luna Blanca (GMA 7)

=== Best New Male TV Personality ===
- **Arjo Atayde (Maalaala Mo Kaya: Bangka / ABS-CBN 2)**
- Harvey Bautista (Goin’ Bulilit / ABS-CBN 2)
- Kiko Estrada (Tween Hearts / GMA 7)
- Michael Pangilinan (Walang Tulugan with the Master Showman / GMA 7)
- Khalil Ramos (Princess and I / ABS-CBN 2)
- Richard Yap (My Binondo Girl / ABS-CBN 2)
- Slater Young (Wansapantaym: Magic Shoes / ABS-CBN 2)

=== Best New Female TV Personality ===
- Jasmine Curtis-Smith (Nandito Ako / TV5)
- Isabelle Daza (Eat Bulaga! / GMA 7)
- Ryzza Mae Dizon (Eat Bulaga! / GMA 7)
- Janine Gutierrez (Together Forever / GMA 7)
- **Divine Lee (Extreme Makeover Home Edition / TV5)**
- Karen Reyes (Toda Max / ABS-CBN 2)
- Myrtle Sarrosa (Toda Max / ABS-CBN 2)

=== Best Comedy/Gag Show ===
- Banana Split (ABS-CBN 2)
- Bubble Gang (GMA 7)
- Goin' Bulilit (ABS-CBN 2)
- Pepito Manaloto (GMA 7)
- Show Me Da Manny (GMA 7)
- **Toda Max (ABS-CBN) 2**
- Tweets For My Sweet (GMA 7)

=== Best Comedy Actor ===
- Ogie Alcasid (Bubble Gang / GMA 7)
- Jose Manalo (The Jose and Wally Show Starring Vic Sotto / TV5)
- Vhong Navarro (Toda Max / ABS-CBN 2)
- **Robin Padilla (Toda Max / ABS-CBN 2)**
- Roderick Paulate (Tweets For My Sweet / GMA 7)
- Vic Sotto (The Jose and Wally Show Starring Vic Sotto / TV5)
- Michael V. (Pepito Manaloto / GMA 7)

=== Best Comedy Actress ===
- Angel Locsin (Toda Max / ABS-CBN 2)
- Angelica Panganiban (Banana Split / ABS-CBN 2)
- **Pokwang (Toda Max / ABS-CBN 2)**
- **Rufa Mae Quinto (Bubble Gang / GMA 7)**
- Manilyn Reynes (Pepito Manaloto / GMA 7)
- Marian Rivera (Tweets For My Sweet / GMA 7)
- Nova Villa (Tweets For My Sweet (/ GMA 7)

=== Best Musical/Variety Show ===
- **ASAP 2012 (ABS-CBN 2)**
- Hey It's Saberdey! (TV5)
- Party Pilipinas (GMA 7)
- Sarah G. Live (ABS-CBN 2)
- Sessions On 25th Street (Net 25)
- Sunday Funday (TV5)
- Walang Tulugan with the Master Showman (GMA 7)

=== Best Female TV Host ===
- Julia Clarete (Eat Bulaga! / GMA 7)
- KC Concepcion (ASAP 2012 / ABS-CBN 2)
- Sarah Geronimo (Sarah G. Live / ABS-CBN 2)
- **Toni Gonzaga (ASAP 2012 / ABS-CBN 2)**
- Pia Guanio (Eat Bulaga! / GMA 7)
- Zsa Zsa Padilla (ASAP 2012 / ABS-CBN 2)
- Regine Velasquez (Party Pilipinas / GMA 7)

=== Best Male TV Host ===
- Ryan Agoncillo (Eat Bulaga! / GMA 7)
- **Billy Crawford (ASAP 2012 / ABS-CBN 2)**
- John Lloyd Cruz (ASAP 2012 / ABS-CBN 2)
- Allan K (Eat Bulaga! / GMA 7)
- Luis Manzano (Sarah G. Live / ABS-CBN 2)
- German Moreno (Walang Tulugan With The Master Showman / GMA 7)
- Vic Sotto (Eat Bulaga! / GMA 7)

=== Best Public Service Program ===
- Ako Ang Simula (ABS-CBN 2)
- Imbestigador (GMA 7)
- Legal Forum (GMA News TV 11)
- Public Atorni: Asunto o Areglo (TV5)
- Salamat Dok (ABS-CBN 2)
- **Wish Ko Lang (GMA 7)**
- XXX: Exklusibong, Explosibong, Exposé (ABS-CBN 2)

=== Best Public Service Program Host ===
- **Persida Acosta (Publi Atorni: Asunto O Areglo / TV5)**
- Julius Babao Anthony Taberna and Pinky Webb (XXX: Exklusibong, Explosibong, Exposé / ABS-CBN 2)
- Arnold Clavio (Rescue / GMA 7)
- Karen Davila, Potchy Labog and Anthony Taberna (Ako Ang Simula / ABS-CBN 2)
- Alvin Elchico and Bernadette Sembrano (Salamat Dok / ABS-CBN 2)
- Mike Enriquez (Imbestigador / GMA 7)
- Vicky Morales (Wish Ko Lang! / GMA 7)

=== Best Horror/Fantasy Program ===
- Oka Tokat (ABS-CBN)
- Pidol's Wonderland (TV5)
- Regal Shocker (TV5)
- Spooky Nights (GMA-7)
- **Wansapanataym (ABS-CBN 2)**

=== Best Reality/Game Show ===
- Amazing Cooking Kids (GMA 7)
- Best Men (GMA News TV 11)
- Game N Go (TV5)
- I Dare You (ABS-CBN 2)
- **It's Showtime (ABS-CBN 2)**
- Manny Many Prizes (GMA 7)
- Wil Time Bigtime (TV5)

=== Best Reality/Game Show Host ===
- Lovely Abella, Beybisaya, Sugar Mercado, Willie Revillame, Mariel Rodriguez, Shalani Soledad and Camille Villar (Wil Time Bigtime / TV5)
- **Kim Atienza, Ryan Bang, Teddy Corpuz, Billy Crawford, Coleen Garcia, Jhong Hilario, Jugs Jugueta, Karylle, Joy Rendon, Vice Ganda, Vhong Navarro and Anne Curtis (It's Showtime / ABS-CBN 2)**
- Sharon Cuneta and Derek Ramsay (The Biggest Loser Pinoy Edition / ABS-CBN 2)
- Robi Domingo, Toni Gonzaga and Bianca Gonzalez (Pinoy Big Brother Unlimited / ABS-CBN 2)
- Luis Manzano (Kapamilya Deal Or No Deal / ABS-CBN 2)
- Judy Ann Santos (Junior Master: Chef Pinoy Edition / ABS-CBN 2)
- Vic Sotto Who Wants To Be A Millionaire (TV5)

=== Best Talent Search Program ===
- ASOP (A Song Of Praise) Music Festival (UNTV 37)
- Promil Pre-School I-Shine! Talent Camp (ABS-CBN 2)
- Protégé: The Battle For The Big Break (GMA 7)
- **Talentadong Pinoy (TV5)**
- Talentadong Pinoy Kids (TV5)

=== Best Talent Search Program Host ===
- Ryan Agoncillo (Talentadong Pinoy / TV5)
- Ogie Alcasid, Dingdong Dantes and Jennylyn Mercado (Protégé: The Battle For The Big Break / GMA 7)
- **Billy Crawford and Luis Manzano (Pilipinas Got Talent / ABS-CBN 2)**
- Matteo Guidicelli, Xian Lim and Dimples Romana (Promil Pre-School I-Shine! Talent Camp / ABS-CBN 2)
- Toni Rose Gayda and Richard Reynoso (ASOP (A Song Of Praise) Music Festival / UNTV 37)

=== Best Youth Oriented Program ===
- Bagets: Just Got Lucky (TV5)
- Good Vibes (ABS-CBN 2)
- Growing Up (ABS-CBN 2)
- Klasrum (UNTV 37)
- **Luv U (ABS-CBN 2)**
- Together Forever (GMA 7)
- Tween Hearts (GMA 7)

=== Best Educational/Children's Program ===
- Batibot (TV5)
- Born to Be Wild (GMA 7)
- Chef Boy Logro: Kusina Master (GMA 7)
- Convergence (Net 25)
- Kabuhayang Swak na Swak (ABS-CBN 2)
- **Matanglawin (ABS-CBN 2)**
- Pinoy Explorer (TV5)

=== Best Educational/Children's Program Host ===
- **Kim Atienza (Matanglawin / ABS-CBN 2)**
- Neilsen Donato and Kiko Rustia (Born to Be Wild / GMA 7)
- Boy Logro (Kusina Master / GMA 7)
- Aga Muhlach (Pinoy Explorer / TV5)
- Bong Revilla (Kap's Amazing Stories / GMA 7)
- Dimples Romana and Bobby Yan (Kabuhayang Swak Na Swak / ABS-CBN 2)
- Chris Tiu (I-Bilib / GMA 7)

=== Best Showbiz Oriented/Celebrity Talk Show ===
- Gandang Gabi Vice (ABS-CBN 2)
- Kris TV (ABS-CBN 2)
- Sharon: Kasama Mo, Kapatid (TV5)
- Showbiz Central (GMA 7)
- Spoon (Net 25)
- Startalk (GMA 7)
- **The Buzz (ABS-CBN 2)**

=== Best Male Showbiz Oriented/Celebrity Talk Show Host ===
- Ogie Alcasid (Pare and Pare / GMA 7)
- Joey de Leon (Mel and Joey / GMA 7)
- Butch Francsico (Startalk / GMA 7)
- **Vice Ganda (Gandang Gabi Vice / ABS-CBN 2)**
- Raymond Gutierrez (Showbiz Central / GMA 7)
- Ricky Lo (Startalk / GMA 7)
- Michael V. (Pare and Pare / GMA 7)

=== Best Female Showbiz Oriented/Celebrity Talk Show Host ===
- **Kris Aquino (Kris TV / ABS-CBN 2)**
- KC Concepcion (The Buzz / ABS-CBN 2)
- Janice de Belen (Spoon / Net 25)
- Cristy Fermin (Paparazzi / TV5)
- Toni Gonzaga (The Buzz / ABS-CBN 2)
- Gladys Reyes (Moments / Net 25)
- Mel Tiangco (Powerhouse / GMA News TV 11)

=== Best Documentary Program ===
- **I-Witness (GMA 7)**
- Investigative Documentaries (GMA News TV 11)
- Krusada (ABS-CBN 2)
- Reel Time (GMA News TV 11)
- Reporter's Notebook (GMA 7)
- S.O.C.O.: Scene of the Crime Operatives (ABS-CBN 2)
- Storyline (ABS-CBN 2)

=== Best Documentary Program Host ===
- Gus Abelgas – S.O.C.O.: Scene of the Crime Operatives / ABS-CBN 2)
- ABS-CBN News And Current Affairs Hosts and Anchors (Krusada / ABS-CBN 2)
- **Sandra Aguinaldo, Kara David, Howie Severino and Jay Taruc (I-Witness / GMA 7)**
- Martin Andanar (Crime Klasik / Aksyon TV 41)
- Paolo Bediones (USI: Under Special Investigation / TV5)
- Luchi Cruz-Valdez (Journo / TV5)
- Jiggy Manicad and Maki Pulido (Reporter's Notebook / GMA 7)

=== Best Documentary Special ===
- **Cheche Lazaro Presents: Edsa at Pinoy (ABS-CBN 2)**
- Dolphy: Hari Ng Komedya (ABS-CBN 2)
- Maalaala Mo Kaya 20th Anniversary (ABS-CBN 2)
- Oras Na (GMA 7)
- Philippine Treasures (GMA 7)
- Sa Hapag ng Mga Bayani (GMA News TV 11)
- Sagwan ng Tagumpay (Studio 23)

=== Best Magazine Show ===
- Ang Pinaka (GMA News TV 11)
- Anggulo (TV5)
- Brigada (GMA News TV 11)
- Good News (GMA News TV 11)
- **Kapuso Mo, Jessica Soho (GMA 7)**
- Rated K (ABS-CBN 2)
- Tunay Na Buhay (GMA 7)

=== Best Magazine Show Host ===
- Cesar Apolinario and Susan Enriquez (I Juander / GMA News TV 11)
- Luchi Cruz-Valdez (Anggulo / TV5)
- Rovilson Fernandez (Ang Pinaka / GMA News TV 11)
- Vicky Morales (Good News / GMA News TV 11)
- Korina Sanchez (Rated K / ABS-CBN 2)
- Rhea Santos (Tunay Na Buhay / GMA 7)
- **Jessica Soho (Kapuso Mo, Jessica Soho / GMA 7)**

=== Best News Program ===
- 24 Oras (GMA 7)
- Aksyon (TV5)
- Balitanghali (GMA News TV 11)
- Bandila (ABS-CBN 2)
- Saksi (GMA 7)
- State of the Nation (GMA News TV 11)
- **TV Patrol 25 (ABS-CBN 2)**

=== Best Male Newscaster ===
- Julius Babao (Bandila (ABS-CBN 2)
- Arnold Clavio (Balita Pilipinas Primetime / GMA News TV 11)
- Kirby Cristobal (News @ 1 / PTV 4)
- Noli de Castro (TV Patrol / ABS-CBN 2)
- Mike Enriquez (24 Oras / GMA 7)
- **Ted Failon (TV Patrol 25 / ABS-CBN 2)**
- Anthony Taberna (Iba-Balita ni Anthony Taberna / Studio 23)
- Raffy Tima (Balitanghali / GMA News TV 11)

=== Best Female Newscaster ===
- Pia Arcangel (Balitanghali / GMA News TV 11)
- Cheryl Cosim (Aksyon / TV5)
- Karen Davila (Bandila / ABS-CBN 2)
- Ces Drilon (Bandila / ABS-CBN 2)
- **Vicky Morales (Saksi / GMA 7)**
- Korina Sanchez (TV Patrol / ABS-CBN 2)
- Jessica Soho (State of the Nation / GMA News TV 11)
- Mel Tiangco (24 Oras / GMA 7)

=== Best Morning Show ===
- Good Morning Club (TV5)
- Good Morning Kuya (UNTV 37)
- Home Page (Net 25)
- Kumare Klub (TV5)
- Metro One (PTV 4)
- **Umagang Kay Ganda (ABS-CBN 2)**
- Unang Hirit (GMA 7)

=== Best Morning Show Host ===
- Nica Alejar, Tony Arevalo, Ronald Defeo, Chris dela Cruz, Rodel Flordeliz, Roberto Garcia, Rene Jose, Rolly Layug, Minyong, Mr. Bin, Pangyao, Sahlee Piamonte, Lyn Perez, Ponce, Daniel Razon, Beth Santiago, Aldrin Solibet, Dondon Tenorio and Lea Ylagan (Good Morning Kuya / UNTV 37)
- Martin Andanar, Paolo Bediones, Christine Bersola-Babao, Cheryl Cosim, Pat Fernandez, April Gustilo, Roda Magnaye, Lucky Mercado, Amy Perez, Raymar Reyes, Chiqui Roa-Puno, Shalala, Makata Tawanan and Joseph Ubalde (Good Morning Club / TV5)
- Alma Angeles, Eduard Banez, Weng dela Fuente and Nelson Lubao (Home Page / Net 25)
- Love Añover, Pia Arcangel, Drew Arellano, Lyn Ching-Pascual, Arnold Clavio, Gabby Concepcion, Nathaniel Cruz, Luane Dy, Susan Enriquez, Suzi Entrata-Abrera, Ivan Mayrina, Winnie Monsod, Lhar Santiago, Rhea Santos, Connie Sison and Monica Verallo (Unang Hirit / GMA 7)
- **Gerry Baja, Winnie Cordero, MJ Felipe, Andre Felix, Bianca Gonzalez, Venus Raj, Edmund Rosales, Alex Santos, Bernadette Sembrano, Anthony Taberna, Ariel Ureta and Iya Villania (Umagang Kay Ganda / ABS-CBN 2)**
- Christine Bersola-Babao, Amy Perez and Chiqui Roa-Puno (Kumare Klub (TV5)
- Audrey Gorricetta, Issa Litton, Dianne Medina, JC Tejano and Gio Tingson (Metro One (PTV 4)

=== Best Public Affairs Program ===
- Bawal ang Pasaway (GMA News TV 11)
- **The Bottomline with Boy Abunda (ABS-CBN 2)**
- Face to Face (TV5)
- Failon Ngayon (ABS-CBN 2)
- Kasangga Mo Ang Langit (IBC 13)
- Law Profile (UNTV 37)
- Patrol ng Pilipino (ABS-CBN 2)

=== Best Public Affairs Program Host ===
- **Boy Abunda (The Bottomline with Boy Abunda / ABS-CBN 2)**
- Dominic Almelor, Zyann Ambrocio, Atom Araullo, Ryan Chua, Apples Jalandoni, Gretchen Malalad, Jenny Reyes and Jasmin Romero (Patrol ng Pilipino / ABS-CBN 2)
- Arlyn dela Cruz (Exclusive / Net 25)
- Ted Failon (Failon Ngayon / ABS-CBN 2)
- JR Langit and Rey Langit (Kasangga Mo Ang Langit / IBC 13)
- Winnie Monsod (Bawal Ang Pasaway / GMA News TV 11)
- Amy Perez (Face to Face / TV5)

=== Best Lifestyle/Travel Show ===
- Biyaheng Langit (IBC 13)
- Eats More Fun in the Philippines (GMA News TV 11)
- **Landmarks (Net 25)**
- Pinoy Adventures (GMA 7)
- Travel: More Fun In The Philippines (GMA News TV 11)
- Us Girls (Studio 23)
- Weekend Getaway (GMA News TV 11)

=== Best Lifestyle/Travel Show Host ===
- Ina Alegre, Carl Balita and Joy Belmonte (Thumbs Up / Studio 23)
- Angel Aquino, Cheska Garcia and Iya Villania (US Girls / Studio 23)
- Drew Arellano (Weekend Getaway / GMA News TV 11)
- Cesar Apolinario, Maey Bautista, Kara David, Susan Enriquez, Betong Sumaya, Raffy Tima and Mariz Umali (Travel: More Fun in the Philippines / GMA News TV 11)
- Faye de Castro (Landmark / Net 25)
- **Richard Gutierrez (Pinoy Adventure / GMA 7)**
- Rey Langit (Biyaheng Langit / IBC 13)

== Special awards ==
=== Ading Fernando Lifetime Achievement Awardee ===
- Gloria Romero

=== Excellence in Broadcasting Awardee ===
- Buddy Oberas (Male)
- Tina Monzon-Palma (Female)

=== Posthumous Award ===
- Dolphy

=== Stars of the Night ===
- Aga Muhlach (Male)
- Ruffa Gutierrez (Female)

=== Faces of the Night ===
- Bryan Termulo (Male)
- Ai Ai delas Alas (Female)

=== Fabulous Body of the Night ===
- KC Concepcion

=== Celebrity Skin of the Night ===
- Ryan Bang

=== Most Promising Actress ===
- Julia Montes

== See also ==
- PMPC Star Awards for TV
