= Jay Taruc =

Filipino journalist

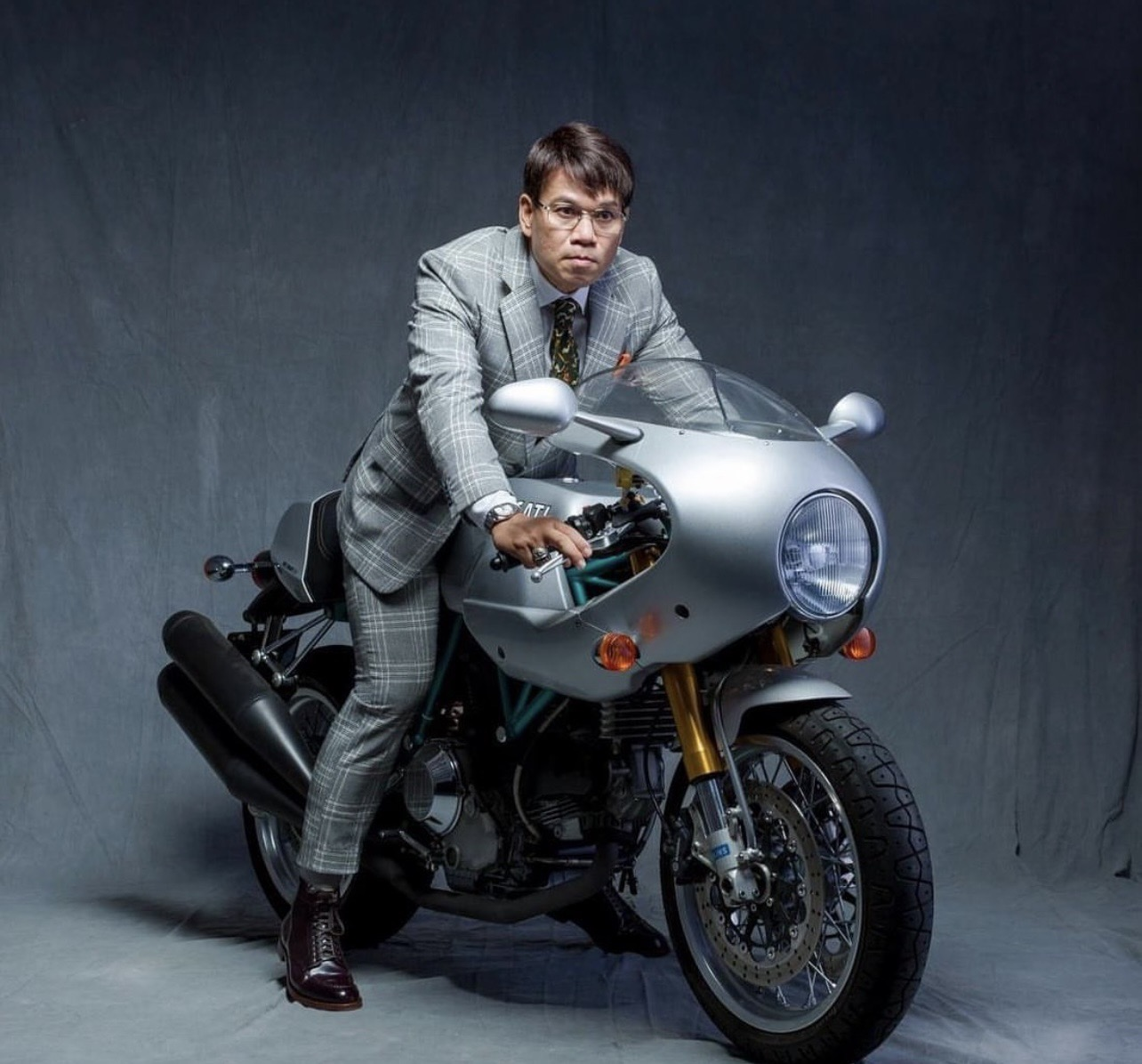
- Born: Jose R. Taruc Jr. January 26, 1973 (age 53)
- Education: Centro Escolar University
- Spouse: Mary Joan B. Taruc
- Children: Jose Luis B. Taruc, Sofia Gabriela B. Taruc
- Parent(s): Jose Malgapo Taruc Jr., Angelita R. Taruc
- Presenting career
- Network: One News (since 2018); GMA Network (1994−2018)
- Website: Ride PH

Jose R. Taruc III (born January 26, 1973 Tagalog pronunciation: [tɐˈɾuk]) is a Filipino journalist and former television news reporter and presenter for GMA Network. Together with Jessica Soho, he won a George Foster Peabody award for his documentary produced for Brigada Siete. In 2019, he moved to One News on airing his program Ride PH (also airing at One PH).

== Background ==
Taruc is the eldest of four children of veteran journalist Joe Taruc and a graduate of broadcasting degree from Centro Escolar University. He married June, a dentist, and the couple has a son named Luis and daughter named Sofia Gabriela. The family lives in Quezon City.

== Career ==
=== Brigada Siete ===
In 1994, Taruc worked as a researcher and production assistant for Brigada Siete, an investigative TV show in GMA Network. He made his first news report on a rupture of Mount Parker's crater in South Cotabato that brought flood in the surrounding community.

He received several awards for the documentaries he made for the show, including the 1998 CNN World Report Award/Category: On Going Story for "Comfort Women." In 1999 together with Jessica Soho's "Kidneys for Sale" and "Kamao," his documentary entitled "Mga Batang Alipin", an exploration into the country's child labor through the coverage of forced detention and rescue of child-workers in a fish sauce factory, won the George Foster Peabody award, the first for the country and the GMA Network. "Mga Batang Alipin" was also a finalist in the New York TV and Film Festival's UNICEF Special Award on that same year and in 2000, it won the Award for Investigative Journalism.

=== News anchor ===
Aside from being a beat news reporter, he worked as substitute anchor for 24 Oras, an evening news program, and GMA News TV's News to Go. He was an anchor of the primetime edition of One Balita Pilipinas on One PH and One News alongside Angela Lagunzad until December 29, 2023.

On March 18, 2024, Taruc became a news anchor of MoJo: Mukha ng Balita on One PH.

=== i-Witness ===
He joined the team of Sandra Aguinaldo, Kara David and Howie Severino that produced i-Witness, a documentary TV show in 2000. The Philippine Army's clearing operation of landmines left by Muslim extremists in Maguindanao was his first documentary that was broadcast in the program.

In 2004, his work entitled "Batang CP" was a finalist in that year's ABU/CASBAA UNICEF Children's Rights Award. It discussed the plight of children with cerebral palsy and co-hosted by Peter Jonas, cerebral palsy-patient who graduated with honors at the University of the Philippines. On the same year, another one of his documentaries named "Basurero" (Scavenger) that depicted extreme urban poverty was the finalist in the New York and Shanghai TV and Film Festival.

He received the UNICEF Child Rights Award at the 45th Asia-Pacific Broadcasting Union general assembly in Indonesia in 2008 for the i-Witness episode "Batang Kalabaw" (Child Beast of Burden) that he produced. The documentary, which also earned the program the CMMA Best Documentary Show in 2009, focused on the story of a teenage girl named Cherilyn, the breadwinner of a family of five children and absent parents, who traded logs by carrying them in the Agusan del Sur mountains.

In 2012, he won the Silver World Medal for Documentary at the New York Festivals for the episode "Lapnos," which covered stories of patients at Mindanao Burn Center. Two years later, his documentary called "Tarima" that was about the indigenous people in Davao del Norte, Mindanao won the 2014 Gawad Agong award.

=== Motorcycle Diaries ===
In interviews, Taruc said that his passion for motorcycles started in 2000 and he preferred them as means of transport. He was also a member of a riders club that traveled around Visayas and Mindanao. By July 15, 2011, he hosted the Motorcycle Diaries, a television documentary show on GMA News TV. The show's title was inspired by a film of the same title that chronicled Che Guevarra's travel around South America on a bike.

The format showed Taruc riding a motorcycle while covering stories of people and places. According to Aris Ilagan of TopGear, it was the first show in the country that had the format and wrote, "With his deep passion for motorcycles and documentaries, he was able to produce a hit series that earned him a strong following in the motorcycle community." It ended on March 16, 2017, despite high ratings and critical success due to inadequate sponsorship to cover production costs.

=== Ride PH/Ride Radio ===
He left GMA Network in August 2018 when he had difficulties meeting the demands of work while looking after his daughter who was diagnosed with spinal muscular atrophy. On August 20, 2017, he co-produced and hosted Ride PH, a half-hour TV show on GMA News TV. The program focused on the culture and community of motorcycle riders, road safety, and vehicle maintenance.

In 2019, Ride PH finally moved to its new home at One News (also aired on One PH). Subsequently, he has also a new show at One PH titled Ride Radio which airs every Saturday at 5:00 pm.

== Awards and recognition ==
International Awards
Awards	Year	Description
George Foster Peabody Awards	1999, 2010	Recognized as a part of the I-Witness team for grounbreaking storytelling in broadcast journalism
UNICEF Child Rights Award	2008	For the I-Witness episode Batang Kalabaw, addressing the struggles of child laborers in the logging industry
New York Festivals Silver Medal	2003	For Lapnos, a poignant documentary about burn victims and their path to recovery

National Awards
Awards	Year	Description
Catholic Mass Media Awards	2008	For the I-Witness Batang kalabaw - Best Adult Educational/Cultural Program GMA Network
Catholic Mass Media Awards	2009	For the I-Witness episode Batang Langoy - Best Adult Educational/Cultural TV Program
Gawad Agong Award	2014	For Tarima, a documentary exploring the plight of indigenous communities in the Philippines
Golden Dove Awards	2008	Granted for excellence in TV documentary production, particularly for episodes aired on I-Witness.
Best Documentary Program Host	2004	18th PMPC Star Awards for Television
Best Documentary Program Host	2006	20th PMPC Star Awards for Television
Best Documentary Program Host	2007	21st PMPC Star Awards for Television
Best Documentary Program Host	2008	22nd PMPC Star Awards for Television
Best Documentary Program Host	2009	23rd PMPC Star Awards for Television
Best Documentary Program Host	2010	24th PMPC Star Awards for Television
Best Documentary Program Host	2011	25th PMPC Star Awards for Television
Best Documentary Program Host	2012	26th PMPC Star Awards for Television
Best Documentary Program Host	2013	27th PMPC Star Awards for Television
Best Documentary Program Host	2014	28th PMPC Star Awards for Television
Best Documentary Program Host	2015	29th PMPC Star Awards for Television
Best Documentary Program Host	2018	32nd PMPC Star Awards for Television
7th PMAP -Best Documentary Program Host	2017	Makatao Award for Excellence
6th National Statistics Month (NSM) Media Award	2016	For his I-Witness Buwis Butil episode Television Category
Pillars of HOPE	2013	For I-Witness episode Bagong Bayani
1st Mabini Media Awards	2014	Best Television Male News Program Reporter
