= Micaela Papa =

Filipino journalist (born 1989)

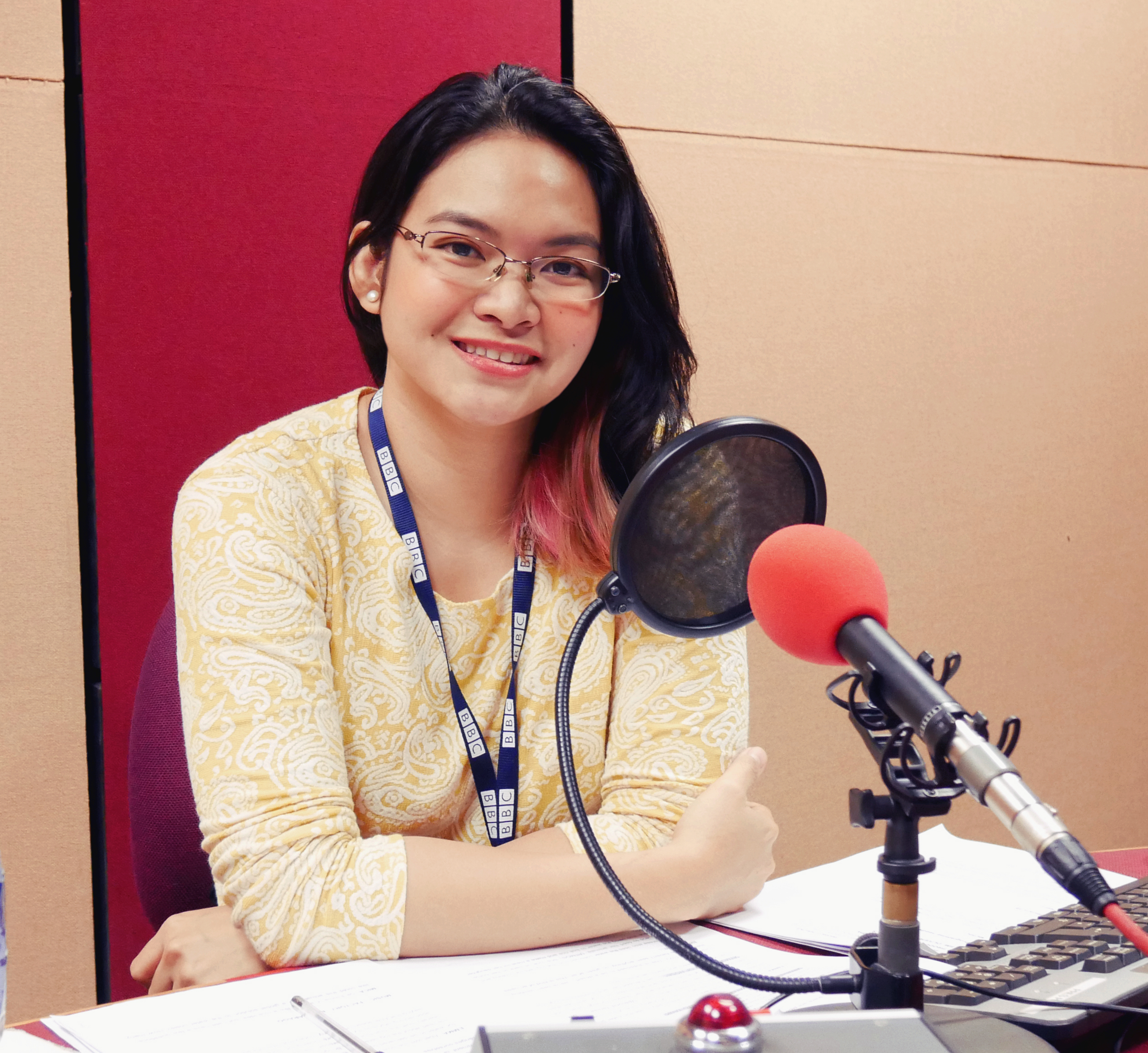
- Papa at the BBC in 2016
- Born: 1989 (age 36–37); Quezon City
- Education: Royal Holloway University of London; University of the Philippines – Diliman
- Occupation: Journalist
- Career
- Show: 24 Oras; Brigada; I-Witness
- Network: GMA Network; BBC
- Country: Philippines
- Website: www.gmanetwork.com/news/video/reporters/29/micaelapapa

Micaela Papa is a Filipino journalist who has worked for the BBC in London and GMA Network in Manila. She is one of the youngest international award-winning broadcast journalist in the Philippines, best known for disaster coverages such as her firsthand report of Supertyphoon Haiyan in 2013 (part of the GMA News' collective entry that won the prestigious Peabody Award) and her documentaries on social issues, such as 2013's Brigada documentary "Gintong Krudo" which garnered several awards, including the Silver World Medal at the New York Festivals and the One World Award from the International Quorum of Motion Picture Producers.

Papa has served as presenter and reporter for episodes of the BBC World Service programmes The Compass and World Hacks, and has produced episodes of Profile for BBC Radio 4. She has also done two-way interviews for other international media networks such as Canada's CBC News.

Papa was a recipient of the prestigious Chevening Scholarship and the One World Media Production Grant.
