= Investigative Documentaries =

Philippine television documentary show

- Title card
- Genre: Investigative journalism
- Presented by: Malou Mangahas
- Country of origin: Philippines
- Original language: Tagalog

Production
- Camera setup: Multiple-camera setup
- Running time: 42 minutes
- Production companies: Philippine Center for Investigative Journalism; GMA News and Public Affairs

Original release
- Network: GMA News TV
- Release: March 3, 2011 – March 12, 2020

Investigative Documentaries is a Philippine television investigative journalism program broadcast by GMA News TV. Hosted by Malou Mangahas, it premiered on March 3, 2011. The show concluded on March 12, 2020.

== Overview ==
The show is hosted by Philippine Center for Investigative Journalism head Malou Mangahas.

== Production ==
The production was halted in March 2020 due to the enhanced community quarantine in Luzon caused by the COVID-19 pandemic.

== Accolades ==
Accolades received by Investigative Documentaries
| Year | Award | Category | Recipient | Result | Ref. |
|---|---|---|---|---|---|
| 2011 | Golden Screen TV Awards | Outstanding Documentary Program | Masbate Political Clan | Nominated | |
| 2011 | Golden Screen TV Awards | Outstanding Documentary Program Host | Malou Mangahas | Nominated | |
| 2012 | 26th PMPC Star Awards for Television | Best Documentary Program | Investigative Documentaries | Nominated | |
| 2013 | 35th Catholic Mass Media Awards | Best Public Service Program | Investigative Documentaries | Won | |
| 2013 | Golden Screen TV Awards | Outstanding Public Affairs Program | Investigative Documentaries | Nominated | |
| 2013 | Golden Screen TV Awards | Outstanding Public Affairs Program Host | Malou Mangahas | Nominated | |
| 2013 | 27th PMPC Star Awards for Television | Best Documentary Program | Investigative Documentaries | Nominated | |
| 2013 | 27th PMPC Star Awards for Television | Best Documentary Program Host | Malou Mangahas | Nominated | |
| 2014 | Golden Screen TV Awards | Outstanding Documentary Program | "Sakahan" (Farm) | Nominated | |
| 2014 | Golden Screen TV Awards | Outstanding Documentary Program Host | Malou Mangahas | Nominated | |
| 2014 | 28th PMPC Star Awards for Television | Best Documentary Program | Investigative Documentaries | Nominated | |
| 2014 | 28th PMPC Star Awards for Television | Best Documentary Program Host | Malou Mangahas | Nominated | |
| 2015 | 29th PMPC Star Awards for Television | Best Documentary Program | Investigative Documentaries | Nominated | |
| 2015 | 29th PMPC Star Awards for Television | Best Documentary Program Host | Malou Mangahas | Nominated | |
| 2016 | 30th PMPC Star Awards for Television | Best Documentary Program Host | Malou Mangahas | Won | |
| 2016 | US International Film and Video Festival | Certificate for Creative Excellence (Social Issues category) | "Gutom" (transl. hunger) | Won | |
| 2017 | 31st PMPC Star Awards for Television | Best Documentary Program | Investigative Documentaries | Nominated | |
| 2017 | 31st PMPC Star Awards for Television | Best Documentary Program Host | Malou Mangahas | Nominated | |
| 2018 | 32nd PMPC Star Awards for Television | Best Documentary Program | Investigative Documentaries | Nominated | |
| 2018 | 32nd PMPC Star Awards for Television | Best Documentary Program Host | Malou Mangahas | Nominated | |
| 2020 | Gandingan 2020: The 14th UPLB Isko’t Iska Multi-media Awards | Most Gender Transformative Program | Investigative Documentaries | Won | |
| 2020 | 42nd Catholic Mass Media Awards | Best News Magazine | "Malasakit" | Won | |
