= Imbestigador =

Philippine television documentary show

- Title card from 2022 to 2023
- Genre: Investigative journalism; Docudrama
- Directed by: King Mark Baco; May Delos Santos
- Presented by: Mike Enriquez
- Country of origin: Philippines
- Original language: Tagalog

Production
- Executive producer: Ian Carlos Simbulan
- Camera setup: Multiple-camera setup
- Running time: 25–34 minutes
- Production company: GMA Public Affairs

Original release
- Network: GMA Network
- Release: August 2, 2000 – September 9, 2023

Imbestigador (transl. investigator) is a Philippine television investigative docudrama show broadcast by GMA Network. Originally hosted by Mike Enriquez, it premiered on August 2, 2000 on the network's evening line up. The show concluded on September 9, 2023.

The series is streaming online on YouTube.

== Overview ==
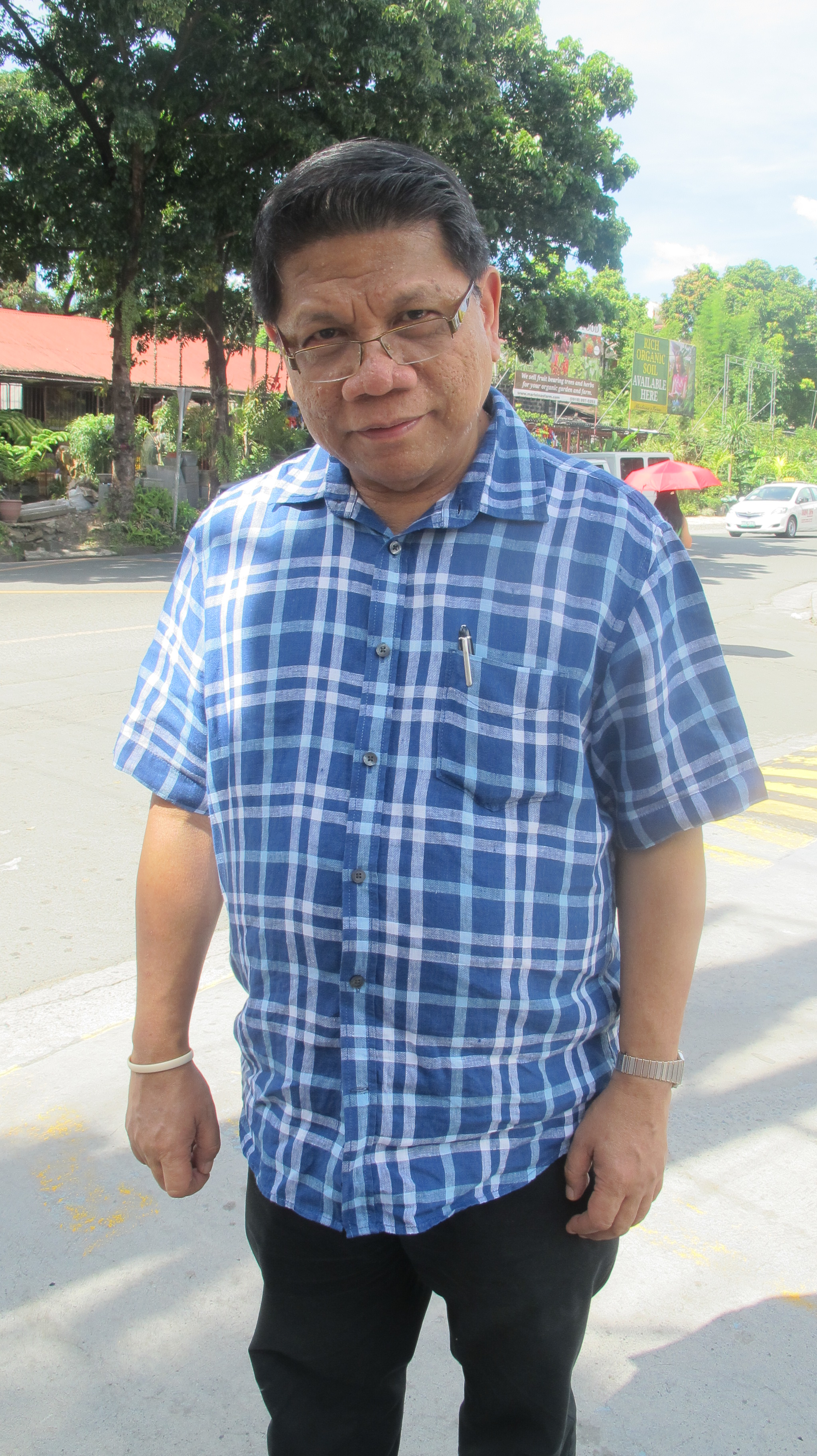
Mike Enriquez served as a host.

The show premiered on August 2, 2000. It began with very casual crime scene reports, which continue to be the usual focus. Various crimes were featured, including kidnapping, slavery, child abuse, and various drug-related crimes. The team was equipped with hidden cameras for doing entrapment operations with the help of the Philippine National Police, the Department of Social Welfare and Development, the Optical Media Board, the Bureau of Customs, the Bureau of Immigration, the Commission on Human Rights, the National Bureau of Investigation, the Department of Justice and the Philippine Drug Enforcement Agency.

From crime reports, the show expanded into an all-around investigative show. It features societal problems such as corruption, problems in local governments, illegal activities, poverty, disloyalty, cleanliness, education, wasted public funds, the youth and public health and safety. The show started dramatizations on January 19, 2014.

The show was presented by different reporters such as Emil Sumangil and John Consulta during Enriquez's medical leave from 2022 until his death on August 29, 2023. On September 2, 2023, an episode dedicated to Enriquez was aired, with Arnold Clavio serving as the narrator.

== Production ==
In March 2020, production was halted due to the enhanced community quarantine in Luzon caused by the COVID-19 pandemic. The show resumed its programming on July 11, 2020.

== Accolades ==
Accolades received by Imbestigador
Year	Award	Category	Recipient	Result	Ref.
2001	15th PMPC Star Awards for Television	Best Public Service Program	Imbestigador	Won	
2001	15th PMPC Star Awards for Television	Best Public Service Program Host	Mike Enriquez	Won	
2003	17th PMPC Star Awards for Television	Best Public Service Program	Imbestigador	Nominated	
2003	17th PMPC Star Awards for Television	Best Public Service Program Host	Mike Enriquez	Nominated	
2004	18th PMPC Star Awards for Television	Best Public Service Program	Imbestigador	Won	
2004	18th PMPC Star Awards for Television	Best Public Service Program Host	Mike Enriquez	Nominated	
2006	20th PMPC Star Awards for Television	Best Public Service Program	Imbestigador	Nominated	
2006	20th PMPC Star Awards for Television	Best Public Service Program Host	Mike Enriquez	Won	
2007	Anak TV Seal Awards	Top 10 Most Well-Liked TV Programs	Imbestigador	Included	
2007	21st PMPC Star Awards for Television	Best Public Service Program	Imbestigador	Nominated	
2007	21st PMPC Star Awards for Television	Best Public Service Program Host	Mike Enriquez	Nominated	
2008	22nd PMPC Star Awards for Television	Best Public Service Program	Imbestigador	Nominated	
2008	22nd PMPC Star Awards for Television	Best Public Service Program Host	Mike Enriquez	Nominated	
2009	23rd PMPC Star Awards for Television	Best Public Service Program	Imbestigador	Won	
2009	23rd PMPC Star Awards for Television	Best Public Service Program Host	Mike Enriquez	Nominated	
2010	24th PMPC Star Awards for Television	Best Public Service Program	Imbestigador	Nominated	
2010	24th PMPC Star Awards for Television	Best Public Service Program Host	Mike Enriquez	Nominated	
2011	8th Golden Screen TV Awards	Outstanding Crime/Investigative Program	"Very Important Preso"	Nominated	
2011	8th Golden Screen TV Awards	Outstanding Crime/Investigative Program Host	Mike Enriquez	Nominated	
2011	25th PMPC Star Awards for Television	Best Public Service Program	Imbestigador	Nominated	
2011	25th PMPC Star Awards for Television	Best Public Service Program Host	Mike Enriquez	Nominated	
2012	26th PMPC Star Awards for Television	Best Public Service Program	Imbestigador	Nominated	
2012	26th PMPC Star Awards for Television	Best Public Service Program Host	Mike Enriquez	Nominated	
2013	10th Golden Screen TV Awards	Outstanding Crime/Investigative Program	Imbestigador	Nominated	
2013	10th Golden Screen TV Awards	Outstanding Crime/Investigative Program Host	Mike Enriquez	Nominated	
2013	4th Northwest Samar State University Students Choice Awards	Best Investigative Journalism Program	Imbestigador	Won	
2013	4th Northwest Samar State University Students Choice Awards	Best Investigative Journalism Program Host	Mike Enriquez	Won	
2013	27th PMPC Star Awards for Television	Best Public Service Program	Imbestigador	Won	
2013	27th PMPC Star Awards for Television	Best Public Service Program Host	Mike Enriquez	Nominated	
2014	Golden Screen TV Awards	Outstanding Crime/Investigative Program	"E-Eleksyon Special"	Nominated	
2014	Golden Screen TV Awards	Outstanding Crime / Investigative Program Host	Mike Enriquez	Nominated	
2014	1st Paragala Central Luzon Media Awards	Best Investigative Program	Imbestigador	Won	
2014	28th PMPC Star Awards for Television	Best Public Service Program	Imbestigador	Nominated	
2014	28th PMPC Star Awards for Television	Best Public Service Program Host	Mike Enriquez	Nominated	
2015	29th PMPC Star Awards for Television	Best Public Service Program	Imbestigador	Nominated	
2016	30th PMPC Star Awards for Television	Best Public Service Program	Imbestigador	Nominated	
2016	30th PMPC Star Awards for Television	Best Public Service Program Host	Mike Enriquez	Nominated	
2017	8th Northwest Samar State University Students' Choice Awards for Radio and Television Awards	Best Investigative Journalism Program	Imbestigador	Won	
2017	31st PMPC Star Awards for Television	Best Public Service Program	Imbestigador	Nominated	
2017	31st PMPC Star Awards for Television	Best Public Service Program Host	Mike Enriquez	Nominated	
2018	32nd PMPC Star Awards for Television	Best Public Service Program	Imbestigador	Nominated	
2019	33rd PMPC Star Awards for Television	Best Public Service Program	Imbestigador	Nominated	
2019	33rd PMPC Star Awards for Television	Best Public Service Program Host	Mike Enriquez	Nominated	
2020	Gandingan 2020: The 14th UPLB Isko't Iska Multi-media Awards	Most Development Oriented Drama Program	"The Gomez-Sarmenta Rape Slay Case"	Won	
2021	34th PMPC Star Awards for Television	Best Public Service Program	Imbestigador	Nominated	
2021	34th PMPC Star Awards for Television	Best Public Service Program Host	Mike Enriquez	Nominated	
2023	35th PMPC Star Awards for Television	Best Public Service Program	Imbestigador	Nominated	
2023	35th PMPC Star Awards for Television	Best Public Service Program Host	Mike Enriquez	Nominated	
2025	37th PMPC Star Awards for Television	Best Public Service Program	Imbestigador	Nominated	
