= Motorcycle Diaries (TV program) =

Philippine television documentary show

- Title card
- Genre: Documentary
- Presented by: Jay Taruc
- Country of origin: Philippines
- Original language: Tagalog

Production
- Camera setup: Multiple-camera setup
- Running time: 45–60 minutes
- Production company: GMA News and Public Affairs

Original release
- Network: GMA News TV
- Release: July 15, 2011 – March 16, 2017

Motorcycle Diaries is a Philippine television documentary show broadcast by GMA News TV. Hosted by Jay Taruc, it premiered on July 15, 2011. The show concluded on March 16, 2017.

== Premise ==
In the show, Jay Taruc visits areas and provinces in the Philippines using his motorcycle. During his travels, he records facts and stories about his surroundings using his diary.
