= Brigada (TV program) =

Philippine television documentary show

- Title card from 2019 to 2024
- Genre: Documentary
- Presented by: Jessica Soho; Kara David
- Country of origin: Philippines
- Original language: Tagalog

Production
- Camera setup: Multiple-camera setup
- Running time: 45 minutes
- Production company: GMA Public Affairs

Original release
- Network: GMA News TV (2011–21); GTV (2021–24)
- Release: February 28, 2011 – March 16, 2024

Related
- Brigada Siete

Brigada (transl. brigade) is a Philippine television documentary show broadcast by GMA News TV and GTV. Originally hosted by Jessica Soho, it premiered on GMA News TV on February 28, 2011. The show concluded on March 16, 2024. Kara David served as the final host.

== Hosts ==
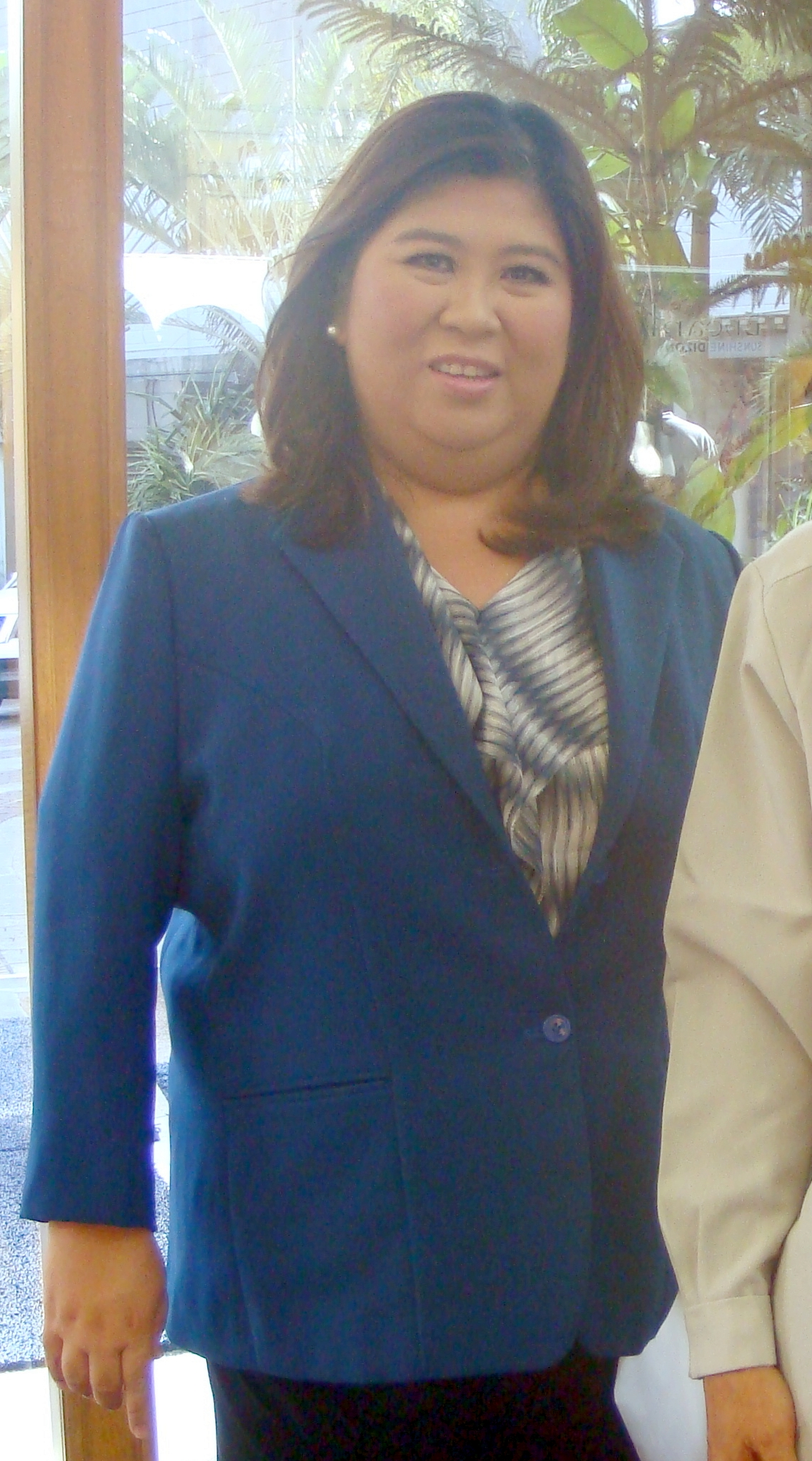
Jessica Soho served as a host.

- Jessica Soho (2011–19)
- Kara David (2019–24)

== Overview ==
The production was halted in March 2020 due to the enhanced community quarantine in Luzon caused by the COVID-19 pandemic. The show resumed its programming on September 19, 2020. In February 2021, GMA News TV was rebranded as GTV, with the show being carried over.

== Accolades ==
Accolades received by Brigada
Year	Award	Category	Recipient	Result	Ref.
2011	Golden Screen TV Awards	Outstanding Public Affairs Program	"Education Special"	Won	
2011	Golden Screen TV Awards	Outstanding Public Affairs Program Host	Jessica Soho	Nominated	
2011	25th PMPC Star Awards for Television	Best Public Affairs Program	Brigada	Nominated	
2011	25th PMPC Star Awards for Television	Best Public Affairs Program Host	Jessica Soho	Nominated	
2012	26th PMPC Star Awards for Television	Best Magazine Show	Brigada	Nominated	
2013	Golden Screen TV Awards	Outstanding Public Affairs Program	Brigada	Nominated	
2013	Golden Screen TV Awards	Outstanding Public Affairs Program Host	Jessica Soho	Nominated	
2013	27th PMPC Star Awards for Television	Best Magazine Show	Brigada	Nominated	
2014	Golden Screen TV Awards	Outstanding Public Affairs Program	"Gintong Krudo, Sipa ng Pag-asa"	Nominated	
2014	Golden Screen TV Awards	Outstanding Public Affairs Program Host	Jessica Soho	Nominated	
2014	28th PMPC Star Awards for Television	Best Documentary Program	Brigada	Nominated	
2014	28th PMPC Star Awards for Television	Best Documentary Program Host	Jessica Soho	Nominated	
2015	29th PMPC Star Awards for Television	Best Magazine Show	Brigada	Nominated	
2016	US International Film and Video Festival	Certificate for Creative Excellence (Social Issues category)	“Para sa Pangarap”	Won	
2017	31st PMPC Star Awards for Television	Best Magazine Show	Brigada	Nominated	
2017	31st PMPC Star Awards for Television	Best Magazine Show Host	Jessica Soho	Nominated	
2018	32nd PMPC Star Awards for Television	Best Documentary Program	Brigada	Nominated	
2018	32nd PMPC Star Awards for Television	Best Documentary Program Host	Jessica Soho	Nominated	
2019	33rd PMPC Star Awards for Television	Best Documentary Program	Brigada	Nominated	
2019	33rd PMPC Star Awards for Television	Best Documentary Program Host	Kara David	Nominated	
2021	34th PMPC Star Awards for Television	Best Documentary Program	Brigada	Nominated	
2021	34th PMPC Star Awards for Television	Best Documentary Program Host	Kara David	Nominated	
2023	35th PMPC Star Awards for Television	Best Documentary Program	Brigada	Nominated	
2023	35th PMPC Star Awards for Television	Best Documentary Program Host	Kara David	Nominated	
2025	37th PMPC Star Awards for Television	Best Documentary Program	Brigada	Nominated	
2025	37th PMPC Star Awards for Television	Best Documentary Program Host	Kara David	Nominated	
