= I-Witness =

Philippine television documentary show

i-Witness
- Title card since 2024
- Also known as: i-Witness: The GMA Documentaries
- Genre: Documentary
- Presented by: Vicky Morales; Luchi Cruz-Valdes; Mike Enriquez; Cheche Lazaro; Jessica Soho; Mel Tiangco; Kara David; Howie Severino; Raffy Tima; Maki Pulido; Jay Taruc; Sandra Aguinaldo; Atom Araullo; Mav Gonzales; John Consulta
- Country of origin: Philippines
- Original language: Tagalog

Production
- Camera setup: Multiple-camera setup
- Running time: 24–30 minutes
- Production companies: Probe Productions Inc. (1999–2003); GMA Public Affairs

Original release
- Network: GMA Network (January 18, 1999 – April 29, 2020, since January 16, 2021); GMA News TV (August 14 – December 25, 2020)
- Release: January 18, 1999 – present

i-Witness, formerly i-Witness: The GMA Documentaries is a Philippine television documentary show broadcast by GMA Network and GMA News TV. Originally hosted by Vicky Morales, Luchi Cruz-Valdes, Mike Enriquez, Cheche Lazaro and Jessica Soho, it premiered on January 18, 1999. Kara David, Howie Severino, Atom Araullo, Mav Gonzales and John Consulta currently serve as the hosts. It is the longest-running documentary show in the Philippines.

The series is streaming online on YouTube.

== Hosts ==
Hosts

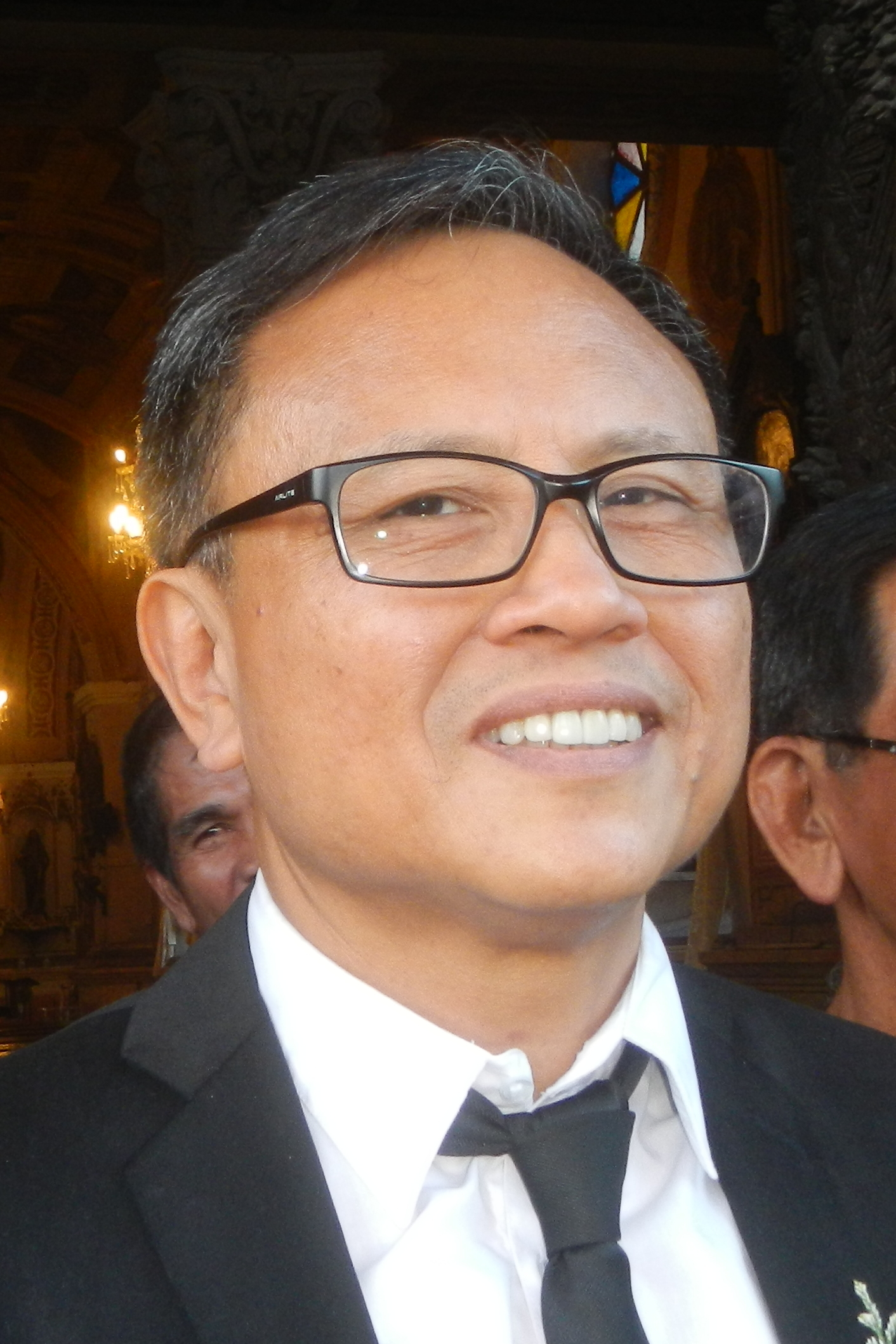
Howie Severino

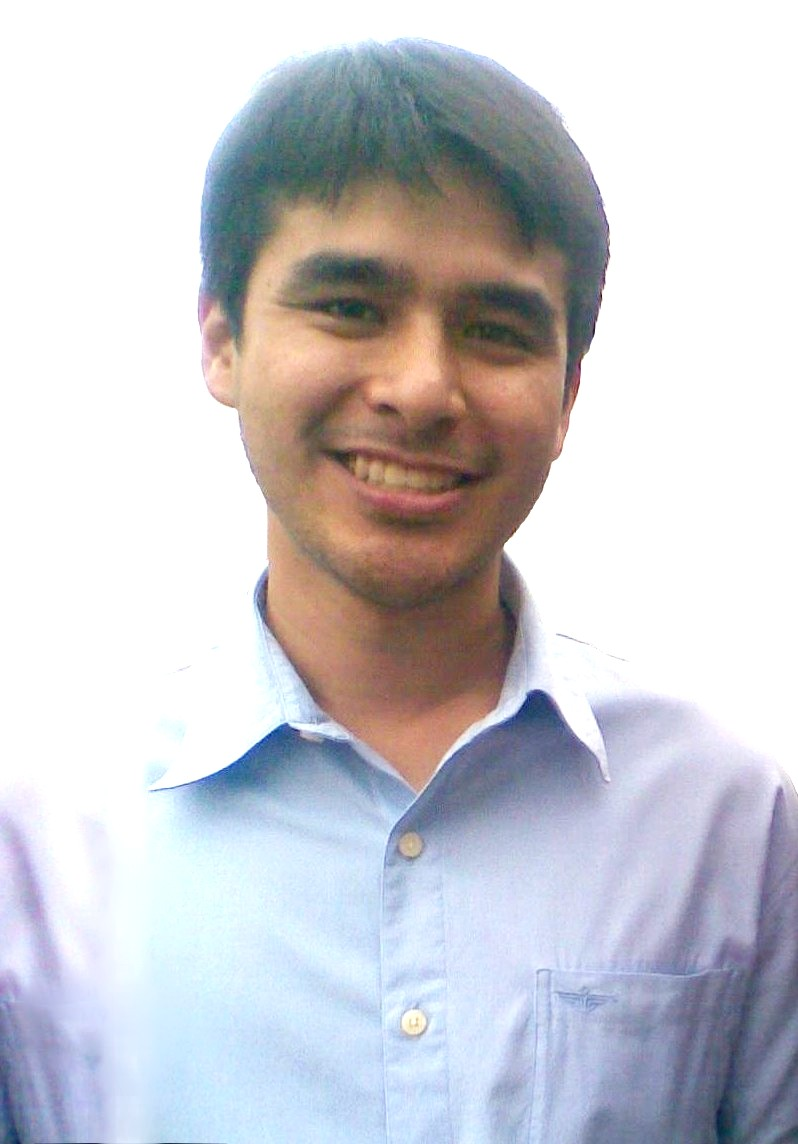
Atom Araullo

- Kara David (since 2001)
- Howie Severino (since 2001)
- Atom Araullo (since 2017)
- Mav Gonzales (since 2023)
- John Consulta (since 2023)

Former hosts

- Vicky Morales (1999–2004)
- Luchi Cruz-Valdes (1999–2002)
- Mike Enriquez (1999–2000)
- Cheche Lazaro (1999–2004)
- Jessica Soho (1999–2004)
- Mel Tiangco (2000–02)
- Raffy Tima (2001–04)
- Maki Pulido (2002–04)
- Jay Taruc (2004–19)
- Sandra Aguinaldo (2004–24)

Guest hosts

- Mariz Umali
- Micaela Papa
- Joseph Morong
- Cesar Apolinario
- Emil Sumangil
- Pia Arcangel
- Ivan Mayrina
- Tina Panganiban-Perez
- Oscar Oida
- Bam Alegre

== Production ==
In March 2020, production was halted due to the enhanced community quarantine in Luzon caused by the COVID-19 pandemic. The show resumed its programming on August 14, 2020.

== Accolades ==
Accolades received by i-Witness
Year	Award	Category	Recipient	Result	Ref.
2000	14th PMPC Star Awards for Television	Best Documentary Program	i-Witness	Won	
2001	15th PMPC Star Awards for Television	Best Documentary Program	i-Witness	Won	
2004	18th PMPC Star Awards for Television	Best Documentary Program	i-Witness	Nominated	
2004	18th PMPC Star Awards for Television	Best Documentary Program Host	Kara David, Vicky Morales, Maki Pulido, Howie Severino, Jay Taruc	Nominated	
2005	19th PMPC Star Awards for Television	Best Documentary Program	i-Witness	Won	
2006	20th PMPC Star Awards for Television	Best Documentary Program	i-Witness	Nominated	
2006	20th PMPC Star Awards for Television	Best Documentary Program Host	Sandra Aguinaldo, Kara David, Howie Severino, Jay Taruc	Nominated	
2007	21st PMPC Star Awards for Television	Best Documentary Program	i-Witness	Won	
2007	21st PMPC Star Awards for Television	Best Documentary Program Host	Sandra Aguinaldo, Kara David, Howie Severino, Jay Taruc	Won	
2008	Catholic Mass Media Awards	Best Adult Educational/Cultural Program	i-Witness	Won	
2008	22nd PMPC Star Awards for Television	Best Documentary Program	i-Witness	Won	
2008	22nd PMPC Star Awards for Television	Best Documentary Program Host	Sandra Aguinaldo, Kara David, Howie Severino, Jay Taruc	Won	
2009	1st MTRCB TV Awards	Best Public Affairs Show	i-Witness	Won	
2009	23rd PMPC Star Awards for Television	Best Documentary Program	i-Witness	Won	
2009	23rd PMPC Star Awards for Television	Best Documentary Program Host	Sandra Aguinaldo, Kara David, Howie Severino, Jay Taruc	Won	
2009	5th USTv Students' Choice Awards	Students' Choice, Documentary Program	i-Witness	Won	
2010	24th PMPC Star Awards for Television	Best Documentary Program	i-Witness	Won	
2010	24th PMPC Star Awards for Television	Best Documentary Program Host	Sandra Aguinaldo, Kara David, Howie Severino, Jay Taruc	Won	
2011	8th Golden Screen TV Awards	Outstanding Documentary Program	"Gintong Putik"	Won	
2011	8th Golden Screen TV Awards	Outstanding Documentary Program	"Lola Minera"	Nominated	
2011	8th Golden Screen TV Awards	Outstanding Documentary Program Host	Kara David	Won	
2011	8th Golden Screen TV Awards	Outstanding Documentary Program Host	Howie Severino	Nominated	
2011	25th PMPC Star Awards for Television	Best Documentary Program	i-Witness	Won	
2011	25th PMPC Star Awards for Television	Best Documentary Program Host	Sandra Aguinaldo, Kara David, Howie Severino, Jay Taruc	Won	
2012	26th PMPC Star Awards for Television	Best Documentary Program	i-Witness	Won	
2012	26th PMPC Star Awards for Television	Best Documentary Program Host	Sandra Aguinaldo, Kara David, Howie Severino, Jay Taruc	Won	
2012	8th USTV Awards	Best Documentary Program	i-Witness	Won	
2013	Golden Screen TV Awards	Outstanding Documentary Program	"Batong Buhay, Buhis Buhay" "Daloy" "Kalam" "Saplot" "Silong"	Nominated	
2013	Golden Screen TV Awards	Outstanding Documentary Program Host	Kara David	Won	
2013	Golden Screen TV Awards	Outstanding Documentary Program Host	Howie Severino Sandra Aguinaldo	Nominated	
2013	4th Northwest Samar State University Students Choice Awards	Best Documentary Program	i-Witness	Won	
2013	4th Northwest Samar State University Students Choice Awards	Best Documentary Program Host	Kara David	Won	
2013	27th PMPC Star Awards for Television	Best Documentary Program	i-Witness	Won	
2013	27th PMPC Star Awards for Television	Best Documentary Program Host	Sandra Aguinaldo, Kara David, Howie Severino, Jay Taruc	Won	
2013	7th UPLB Isko’t Iska’s Broadcast Choice Awards	Best Documentary Program	i-Witness	Won	
2014	Golden Screen TV Awards	Outstanding Documentary Program	"Kamandag Sa Palayan" "Pagbabalik Sa Karagatan" "Rattan Sa Pusod ng Sierra Madre" "Tarima"	Nominated	
2014	Golden Screen TV Awards	Outstanding Documentary Program Host	Kara David Howie Severino Jay Taruc Sandra Aguinaldo	Won	
2014	Golden Screen TV Awards	Outstanding Documentary Program Host	Kara David Howie Severino Jay Taruc Sandra Aguinaldo	Nominated	
2014	Golden Screen TV Awards	Outstanding Documentary Program Host	Kara David Howie Severino Jay Taruc Sandra Aguinaldo	Nominated	
2014	Golden Screen TV Awards	Outstanding Documentary Program Host	Kara David Howie Severino Jay Taruc Sandra Aguinaldo	Nominated	
2014	1st Paragala Central Luzon Media Awards	Best Documentary Program	i-Witness	Won	
2014	28th PMPC Star Awards for Television	Best Documentary Program	i-Witness	Won	
2014	28th PMPC Star Awards for Television	Best Documentary Program Host	Sandra Aguinaldo, Kara David, Howie Severino, Jay Taruc	Won	
2015	29th PMPC Star Awards for Television	Best Documentary Program	i-Witness	Won	
2015	29th PMPC Star Awards for Television	Best Documentary Program Host	Sandra Aguinaldo, Kara David, Howie Severino, Jay Taruc	Won	
2016	30th PMPC Star Awards for Television	Best Documentary Program	i-Witness	Nominated	
2016	30th PMPC Star Awards for Television	Best Documentary Program Host	Sandra Aguinaldo, Kara David	Nominated	
2016	US International Film and Video Festival	Silver Screen Award	"Kawayang Pangarap" (transl. bamboo dreams)	Won	
2017	8th Northwest Samar State University Students' Choice Awards for Radio and Television Awards	Best Documentary Program	i-Witness	Won	
2017	31st PMPC Star Awards for Television	Best Documentary Program	i-Witness	Won	
2017	31st PMPC Star Awards for Television	Best Documentary Program Host	Sandra Aguinaldo, Kara David	Won	
2018	32nd PMPC Star Awards for Television	Best Documentary Program	i-Witness	Nominated	
2018	32nd PMPC Star Awards for Television	Best Documentary Program Host	Sandra Aguinaldo, Atom Araullo, Kara David, Howie Severino, Jay Taruc, Mariz Umali	Won	
2019	33rd PMPC Star Awards for Television	Best Documentary Program	i-Witness	Nominated	
2019	33rd PMPC Star Awards for Television	Best Documentary Program Host	Raffy Tima	Nominated	
2020	42nd Catholic Mass Media Awards	Special Citation: Adult Educational / Cultural Program	"Patient 2828"	Won	
2020	42nd Catholic Mass Media Awards	Special Citation: Public Service Program	"Manaram"	Won	
2021	34th PMPC Star Awards for Television	Best Documentary Program	i-Witness	Won	
2021	34th PMPC Star Awards for Television	Best Documentary Program Host	Raffy Tima Howie Severino Atom Araullo Kara David Sandra Aguinaldo	Nominated	
2023	35th PMPC Star Awards for Television	Best Documentary Program	i-Witness	Won	
2023	35th PMPC Star Awards for Television	Best Documentary Program Host	Raffy Tima Howie Severino Atom Araullo Kara David Sandra Aguinaldo	Nominated	
2024	6th Gawad Lasallianeta	Most Outstanding Documentary Show	i-Witness	Won	
2024	New York Festivals TV & Film Awards	Documentary: Social Issues	"Bawat Barya"	Silver	
2024	New York Festivals TV & Film Awards	Documentary: Heroes	"Boat to School"	Bronze	
2024	New York Festivals TV & Film Awards	Documentary: Community Portraits	"Sisid sa Putik"	Bronze	
2025	37th PMPC Star Awards for Television	Best Documentary Program Host	Howie Severino Atom Araullo Mav Gonzales Kara David John Consulta	Won	
2025	38th PMPC Star Awards for Television	Best Documentary Program Host	Kara David Howie Severino Atom Araullo Mav Gonzales John Consulta	Won	
