= Sandra Aguinaldo =

Filipino journalist

- Born: April 29, 1975 (age 51); Manila Philippines
- Education: University of Santo Tomas, (BA)
- Occupations: Journalist, news anchor, writer, documentarian
- Years active: 1995–present
- Employer: GMA Network
- Television: 24 Oras; I-Witness; Saksi
- Spouse: Brimar Rodica

Sandra Aguinaldo (born April 29, 1975) is a Filipina television news anchor journalist, writer and documentarian. She is best known as one of the news reporters of 24 Oras and one of the hosts of I-Witness. In 2015, Aguinaldo together with her co-hosts in I-Witness won as the Best Documentary Program Hosts during the 29th PMPC Star Awards for Television.

== Early life ==
Aguinaldo is the only child of Felipe, her father who is an engineer, and Irene, her mother who died when she was four years old. She grew up at Angono, Rizal and she spent her childhood liking different kinds of art. She developed her writing skills in high school and decided to take up journalism at University of Santo Tomas (UST) where she graduated. In 1993, she became the editor-in-chief of The Flame, UST Faculty of Arts and Letters' official student journal.

== Career ==
After Aguinaldo graduated from college, she became a copywriter at an advertising firm. In 1996, she entered the broadcast industry and was the head writer of Usapang Business, a television program of ABS-CBN. After a year, she went to print media and became the senior report of The Manila Times.

Eventually, she worked for GMA Network as news reporter for 24 Oras and Saksi. She also hosted I-Witness, a television documentary program of GMA Network. She initially joined I-Witness in 2006 when Vicky Morales took a leave of absence and she was a temporary replacement but eventually, she became a regular of the show.

When she started as a reporter for GMA Network, she was assigned to difficult reporting tasks such as the conflict in Mindanao, particularly in Jolo, Sulu, where she interviewed members of the Abu Sayyaf, Moro National Liberation Front and Moro Islamic Liberation Front; and she also covered the bombings in Israel. During the campaign of the Philippine presidential election in 2004 and before she was going to report for 24 Oras, she was berated by presidential candidate Fernando Poe, Jr. due to her presence at the stage. Two days after the incident, they were reconciled.

In I-Witness, she was able to produce different kinds of documentary including topics about poverty, which was questioned in 2012 when Aguinaldo and her co-hosts were at the "docufest" in Baguio. It was asked that "in continuing to feature stories of poverty, are documentaries a form of exploitation?". For Aguinaldo, when she makes documentary about poverty, she tries to give inspiration instead of making the poor people depressed. Her documentary entitled "Pasan-Pasan" is about children with disability who goes to school despite being handicapped. She also presented the documentary entitled "Iskul ko No. 1", which is about the Sindagan Elementary School, a school in Southern Leyte ranked top one in the 2006 National Achievement Test for graduating students. "Iskul ko No. 1" won silver medal during the 2007 New York Festivals.

In 2014, Aguinaldo together with Arnold Clavio were awarded by USTv of University of Santo Tomas as the Outstanding Thomasian Media Personalities. In 2015, Aguinaldo together with Kara David, Howie Severino and Jay Taruc won as the Best Documentary Program Hosts for I-Witness during the 29th PMPC Star Awards for Television. In 2016, Aguinaldo together with Kara David were nominated in the same category during the 30th PMPC Star Awards for Television but they lost.

== Personal life ==
Aguinaldo is married to Brimar Rodica, a police officer whom Aguinaldo met during a funeral in Pangasinan.

== Awards ==
Year	Work	Award	Category	Result	Source
2011	I-Witness	25th PMPC Star Awards for Television	Best Documentary Program Host	Won	
2011	I-Witness	8th Lasallian Scholarum Awards	Recipient, Outstanding Televised Feature on Youth and Education	Won	
2012	I-Witness	26th PMPC Star Awards for Television	Outstanding Documentary Program Host	Won	
2013	I-Witness	4th ENPRESS Golden Screen TV Awards	Outstanding Documentary Program Host	Nominated	
2014	I-Witness	28th PMPC Star Awards for Television	Best Documentary Program Host	Won	
2014	—N/a	10th USTv Student's Choice Awards	Outstanding Thomasian Media Personality	Won	
2015	I-Witness	29th PMPC Star Awards for Television	Best Documentary Program Host	Won	
2015	I-Witness	9th Gandingan Awards (UP Los Baños)	Best Documentary Program Host	Won	
2015	I-Witness	6th ENPRESS Golden Screen TV Awards	Outstanding Documentary Program Host	Won	
2016	I-Witness	10th Gandingan Awards (UP Los Baños)	Gandingan ng Kabataan	Won	
2016	I-Witness	Platinum Stallion Media Awards of Trinity University of Asia	Most Trusted Field Reporter	Won	
2017	I-Witness	31st PMPC Star Awards for Television	Best Documentary Program Host	Won	
2017	I-Witness	7th Edukcircle Awards	Best Documentary Program Host	Won	
2017	I-Witness	11th Gandingan Awards (UP Los Baños)	Best Documentary Program Host	Won	
2017	I-Witness	7th PMAP Makatao Media Excellence Awards	Special Award	Won	
2018	I-Witness	32nd PMPC Star Awards for Television	Best Documentary Program Host	Won	
