= I Survived: Hindi Sumusuko Ang Pinoy =

- Genre: Documentary
- Created by: ABS-CBN Corporation
- Developed by: ABS-CBN News and Current Affairs
- Directed by: Pinggoy Generoso; Nico Hernandez; JV Noriega; Sherman So; Toffie Nerviza
- Presented by: Ces Drilon
- Narrated by: Ces Drilon
- Country of origin: Philippines
- Original language: Filipino
- No. of episodes: 87

Production
- Executive producer: Alex Alik pala
- Producer: Marnie Giron
- Running time: 45 minutes

Original release
- Network: ABS-CBN
- Release: March 19, 2009 – December 2, 2010

Related
- Krusada

I Survived: Hindi Sumusuko Ang Pinoy (English: I Survived: Filipinos Don't Give Up) is a Philippine television documentary show broadcast by ABS-CBN. Hosted by Ces Drilon, it aired from March 19, 2009 to December 2, 2010, and was replaced by Krusada.

== Awards and nominations ==
- Nominated - Best Documentary Program - 23rd PMPC Star Awards for Television
- Nominated - Ces Oreña-Drilon - Best Documentary Program Host - 23rd PMPC Star Awards for Television
- Nominated - Best Current Affairs Programme - 14th Asian Television Awards
