= Public Atorni: Asunto o Areglo =

Filipino television show

- Genre: Court show
- Created by: Associated Broadcasting Company
- Developed by: News5
- Directed by: Eric dela Cruz
- Presented by: MJ Marfori
- Starring: Mediator; Atty. Persida Rueda-Acosta
- Country of origin: Philippines
- Original language: Filipino
- No. of episodes: 145

Production
- Executive producer: Queenie Dizon-Rodulfo
- Editor: John Wayne Aguinaldo
- Running time: 30 minutes

Original release
- Network: TV5
- Release: September 9, 2010 – May 11, 2012
- Network: AksyonTV
- Release: May 28, 2012 – 2014

Public Atorni: Asunto o Areglo is a Philippine television court show broadcast by TV5 and AksyonTV. Hosted by MJ Marfori and mediated by Public Attorney's Office chief, Atty. Persida Rueda-Acosta, it aired on TV5 from September 9, 2010 to May 11, 2012, and was replaced by Sharon: Kasama Mo, Kapatid. The show moved to AksyonTV from May 28, 2012 to 2014.

== Format ==
The show starts with a brief explanation of the Alternative dispute resolution. Like a typical court (or in this case, mediation/arbitration), there are two parties, the complainant and the respondent. The mediation starts when Atty. Persida Rueda-Acosta explains the process of mediation. The two parties need to tell the truth, just like litigants in a real trial court. Every party has to tell their side of the story or show evidences that will help their case. Atty. Acosta then explains legal perspective of the issue/s the parties raised and the consequences that will happen if this happens. Then, she'll ask each party "Asunto o Areglo?" (To Sue or To Settle?). If they pick areglo, they need to settle the issue or both parties will a compromise agreement to resolve the issue. They must follow the agreement or they will be sued for disobeying the agreement. If the parties chose asunto, their complaints will be sent to a trial court.

== See also ==
- News5
- List of TV5 (Philippine TV network) original programming
- List of programs broadcast by One Sports
