= Pinoy Explorer =

- Title card from 2013 to 2014
- Genre: Infotainment
- Written by: Benjou Elgincolin; Elmer L. Gatchalian
- Directed by: Rowell L. Santiago
- Presented by: Aga Muhlach
- Country of origin: Philippines
- Original language: Tagalog

Production
- Executive producer: Ma. Theresa Rodriguez
- Editors: Edward Alegre; Clyte Aldys Luis
- Running time: 60 minutes
- Production company: TV5 Entertainment Group

Original release
- Network: TV5
- Release: September 18, 2011 – March 15, 2014

Pinoy Explorer is a Philippine television infotainment show broadcast by TV5. Hosted by Aga Muhlach, it aired on the network's evening line up from September 18, 2011 to May 4, 2013, replacing Magic? Bagsik! and was replaced by Tropang Kulit. It features clips from the Clash of the Titans series and BBC's Walking with Dinosaurs.

It is an edutainment program wherein Aga Muhlach, the host travels to many different places around the globe with an aim to educate the Filipino viewers in discovering the wonders of the world: places, people, artifacts, and history.

The show returned from September 15, 2013 to March 15, 2014. When its last destination is in Russia, coinciding the 2014 Sochi Olympics.

Logo used from the first season

== Host ==
- Aga Muhlach
- Klariz Magboo (trivia voice-over)

== Trivia ==
According to reports, Pinoy Explorer got the highest pilot rating when it was aired last Sunday at 6:30 pm compared to other TV shows in other networks based on the Neilsen Media Research. It posted an impressive 8.3% AMR or a total of 1,975,813 absolute viewers – 84,295 more than ABS-CBN’s TV Patrol Weekend’s 1,891,518 (7.9% AMR); and 465,543 viewers more than GMA’s 24 Oras Weekend’s 1,510,270 (6.3% AMR).

== Destinations ==
1. Episode 1: Thermopolis, Wyoming, USA
2. Episodes 2–3: Cody, Wyoming, USA
3. Episodes 4–5: Arcata, Humboldt County, California, USA
4. Episodes 6–7: Alaska, USA
5. Episodes 9–10: Dubai, United Arab Emirates
6. Episodes 11–12: Nepal
7. Episode 13: Abu Dhabi, United Arab Emirates
8. Episode 14: Dubai, United Arab Emirates
9. Episodes 15–16: Hong Kong SAR, China
10. Episode 17: Shenzhen, China
11. Episodes 22–23: Ho Chi Minh, Vietnam
12. Episode 23: Hanoi, Vietnam
13. Halong Bay, Quảng Ninh province, Vietnam
14. Episode 24: Kuala Lumpur, Malaysia
15. Albay, Philippines
16. Episode 26: Camarines Sur
17. Episode 27: Donsol, Sorsogon, Philippines
18. Episode 28: Rome, Italy
19. Venice, Italy
20. Milan, Italy
21. Batanes, Philippines
22. Los Baños, Laguna, Philippines
23. Anilao, Batangas, Philippines
24. Cavite, Philippines
25. Korea
26. Sydney, Australia
27. Russia

== Accolades ==
Year	Award	Category	Work	Result
2012	34th Catholic Mass Media Awards	Best Adult		
