= Krusada =

Philippine reality drama program

- Title card
- Genre: Reality show
- Created by: ABS-CBN Corporation
- Developed by: ABS-CBN News & Current Affairs
- Directed by: Nico Hernandez; JV Noriega; Various
- Presented by: Hosts/Anchors of ABS-CBN News and Current Affairs
- Opening theme: "Krusada theme"
- Composer: Reev Robledo
- Country of origin: Philippines
- Original language: Tagalog (Filipino)

Production
- Executive producer: Karen Pasion-Namora
- Producers: Wins Aguilar; Christine Chu; Marnie Giron
- Running time: 45 minutes

Original release
- Network: ABS-CBN
- Release: December 9, 2010 – February 21, 2013

Related
- I Survived: Hindi Sumusuko Ang Pinoy

Krusada (lit. 'crusade') is a Philippine television reality show broadcast by ABS-CBN. It aired from December 9, 2010 to February 21, 2013, replacing I Survived: Hindi Sumusuko Ang Pinoy and was replaced by Banana Nite.

== Availability ==
Krusada is aired every Thursday after Bandila on ABS-CBN. With replays every Saturday 1:30 PM on ABS-CBN News Channel. The program also airs in DZMM TeleRadyo.
