= News to Go =

Philippine television news show

- Title card
- Genre: News broadcasting
- Directed by: Noel Cabacungan
- Presented by: Kara David; Howie Severino
- Country of origin: Philippines
- Original language: Tagalog

Production
- Executive producer: Rowena La Torre
- Production locations: Studio 2, GMA Network Center, Quezon City, Philippines
- Camera setup: Multiple-camera setup
- Running time: 30–60 minutes
- Production company: GMA News and Public Affairs

Original release
- Network: GMA News TV
- Release: February 28, 2011 – May 31, 2019

News to Go is a Philippine television news broadcasting show broadcast by GMA News TV. Hosted by Kara David and Howie Severino, it premiered on February 28, 2011 and worldwide on GMA News TV International. The show concluded on May 31, 2019.

== Overview ==
Anchored by Howie Severino and Kara David, it highlighted different news and opinions from the internet.

On April 24, 2017, the newscast was moved from original timeslot (9:00 AM) to its final timeslot and reduced its running brought about by the relaunch and expansion of Dobol B sa News TV.

On May 31, 2019, the newscast aired its final episode to give way to the expansion of Dobol B sa News TV block and transfer of GMA News TV in Manila from Channel 11 to Channel 27 (DWDB-TV) on June 4, 2019.

== Accolades ==
Accolades received by News to Go
Year	Award	Category	Recipient	Result	Ref.
2011	Golden Screen TV Awards	Outstanding News Program	News to Go	Nominated	
2011	Golden Screen TV Awards	Outstanding Female News Presenter	Kara David	Nominated	
2014	Golden Screen TV Awards	Outstanding News Program	News to Go	Nominated	
2014	Golden Screen TV Awards	Outstanding Male News Presenter	Howie Severino	Nominated	
2014	Golden Screen TV Awards	Outstanding Female News Presenter	Kara David	Nominated	
2018	32nd PMPC Star Awards for Television	Best Male Newscaster	Howie Severino	Nominated	
