= Howie Severino =

Filipino broadcast journalist (born 1961)

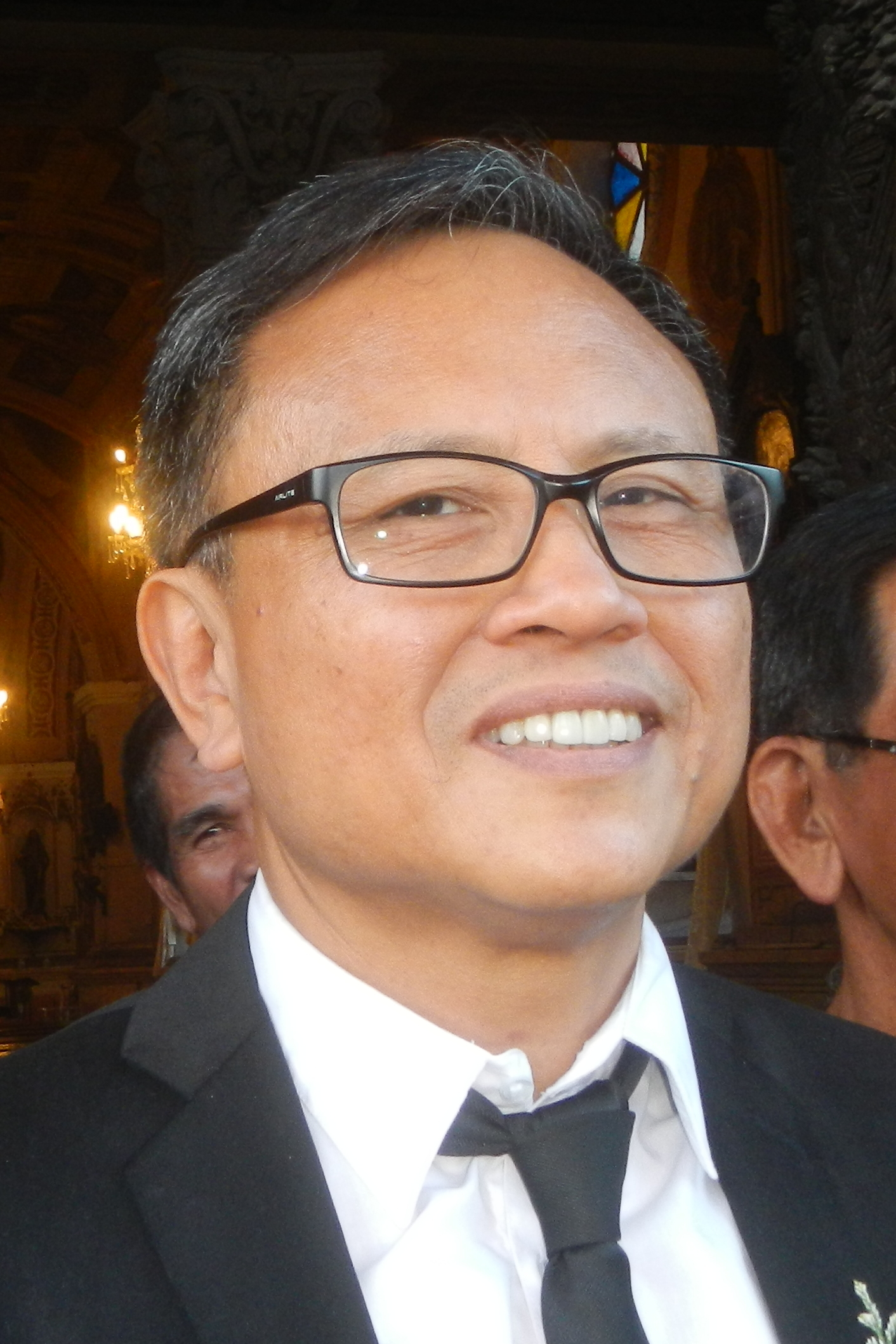
- Severino in January 2018
- Born: Horacio Gorospe Severino; July 18, 1961 (age 65); Philippines
- Education: Tufts University, (BA); University of Sussex, (MA)
- Occupation: Journalist
- Years active: 1988–present
- Employer: GMA Network
- Spouse: Ipat Luna
- Children: Alon Roberto Severino
- Parent(s): Amb. Rodolfo Severino and Tati Gorospe Severino
- Awards: PMPC Star Awards for TV; Rotary Journalism Awards

Horacio "Howie" Gorospe Severino (born July 18, 1961) is a Filipino broadcast journalist, anchor, host, documentarist and podcaster who is currently working in GMA Network, as consultant of GMA News, editor-at-large of GMA News Online, and is best known for hosting GMA Public Affairs' documentary program i-Witness.

Severino is also notable for his works in Philippine Center for Investigative Journalism and The Probe Team. He has worked in print, television, and online media.

== Background ==
=== Education ===
He has said he wanted to be a journalist ever since he was in fifth grade. He graduated from Tufts University in Massachusetts with a history degree, magna cum laude, and received his master's degree from University of Sussex in the United Kingdom in Environment, Development, and Policy.

As a college student in Boston in the early 1980s, he got to know Benigno Aquino Jr., then in exile. After Aquino's assassination in 1983, Severino returned home to teach at his alma mater Ateneo de Manila High School, and join the anti-Marcos movement. He was arrested while taking pictures of a police dispersal of a student barricade in front of Ateneo campus on January 28, 1985, the same day as Lino Brocka and Behn Cervantes. Severino was detained for eight days in Fort Bonifacio, which was at the time a dreaded army camp and not yet the high-end commercial and residential hub that it is today.

=== Career ===
Severino was a campus journalist at Tufts University for all four years in college. In the Philippines, he began his journalism career as a newspaper reporter and magazine writer in 1988. He became a co-founder of the Philippine Center for Investigative Journalism (PCIJ) in 1989; established himself as a leading documentary filmmaker; and, in 2009, was named editor-in-chief of GMA News Online, GMA Network's news website. He stepped down in 2014 after five years, and was appointed GMA Network's vice president for Professional Development in May 2014.

On TV, he was on Probe Team for four years with Cheche Lazaro before joining i-Witness, now one of the longest-running public affairs programs in the Philippines.

He set up the PCIJ's Environment Desk, built credentials as a leading environmental journalist, and worked closely with Ramon Magsaysay awardee Sheila Coronel. He still produces environmental documentaries for i-Witness and often appears on television riding his mountain bike.

Online, he was the first blogger on GMA's web platforms. His journalistic exploration of emerging media culminated in 2009 with his appointment as GMA Network's vice president for Multimedia Journalism and his subsequent assignment to helm GMA News Online.

As GMA News Online's editor-in-chief, Severino and his team pioneered in the Philippines the use of Google Maps for disaster coverage, Twitter for breaking news, and crowdsourcing for news gathering.

Along with fellow i-Witness documentarist Kara David, Severino was the anchor of GMA News TV's morning newscast News to Go in 2011, until its conclusion in 2019.

He also hosted his own podcast The Howie Severino Podcast, which was produced by GMA News and Public Affairs.

Following the split of GMA News and Public Affairs in 2022, Severino became the consultant of now-rebranded news division GMA Integrated News, while he remained in GMA Public Affairs to continue making documentaries in i-Witness.

== Personal life ==
Severino's parents are Ambassador Rodolfo Severino Jr., former secretary-general of the Association of Southeast Asian Nations (ASEAN) from 1998 to 2002, and Tati Gorospe Severino. a former schoolteacher and administrator.

Severino is married to Ipat Luna, an environmental lawyer and TOYM awardee, with whom he has a son, Alon Roberto. In 2012, Alon, 10, was named Best Child Performer by the Aliw Awards for his role in Totong Hilot, a full-length play staged in the Cultural Center of the Philippines during the Virgin Labfest.

On April 7, 2020, it was revealed that Severino was the country's 2,828th COVID-19 patient during the COVID-19 pandemic in the Philippines. He later recovered from the coronavirus after being in the hospital for eleven days. A special i-Witness documentary about his experience as a COVID-positive patient; entitled Ako si Patient 2828, aired on GMA on April 18, 2020.

== Awards and citations ==
Severino is one of the Philippines' most awarded journalists. His awards include:

- Neil Davis-Bill Latch Memorial Award given to one young Asia-Pacific journalist, 1991
- CMMA best newspaper reporter, 1991
- Jaime V Ongpin Grand Prize, Investigative reporting, 1996
- Four-time winner of Rotary Club of Manila's Journalist of the Year awards
- Three-time winner of UPLB's Gandingan awards (Best Documentarist)
- Titus Brandsma Award for Leadership in Journalism, 2009
- PUP's Mabini Award for Media
- PUP's MARINGAL NA PANTAS award for contributions to historical studies, 2012
- PHL Medical Association's Rizal award for documentaries on Rizal
- Adamson's first Adamson Univ. Media Award, 2011
- La Sallian Scholarum Award for Best TV feature for youth, 2005

In 2007, Severino was inducted into the Rotary Club of Manila's Journalism Hall of Fame after he was named Broadcast Journalist of the Year twice and Investigative Journalist of the Year twice.

In October 2007, GMA Network released Ten Years of Howie Severino, a DVD compilation of ten of his most notable documentaries. Included on the DVD was Huling Hala-bira, a documentary about a family living under the railroad tracks in Pandacan, Manila, which won second prize that same year in a United Nations-sponsored international broadcast competition.

In a 2009 trust survey conducted by Reader's Digest magazine, Severino was sixth on a list of most trusted Filipinos.

People Asia Magazine, in its June–July 2012 issue, named Severino one of that year's "Men Who Matter".

== See also ==
- GMA News
- GMA Public Affairs
