= Balita Pilipinas Primetime =

Philippine television news show

- Title card
- Genre: News broadcasting
- Presented by: Arnold Clavio; CJ Torida; Bobby Nalzaro; Tek Ocampo
- Country of origin: Philippines
- Original language: Tagalog

Production
- Production locations: Studio 2, GMA Network Center, Quezon City, Philippines
- Running time: 42 minutes
- Production company: GMA News and Public Affairs

Original release
- Network: GMA News TV
- Release: March 5, 2011 – February 15, 2014

Balita Pilipinas Primetime (transl. news Philippines primetime) is a Philippine television news broadcasting show broadcast by GMA News TV. Anchored by Arnold Clavio, it premiered on March 5, 2011. The show concluded on February 15, 2014.

== Overview ==
The newscast was anchored by Arnold Clavio from the GMA Network Studios in Quezon City, with its regional anchors from GMA stations in Luzon, Visayas and Mindanao. It features different news from the different regions in the Philippines. The news from Luzon were reported by CJ Torida of GMA Dagupan, while from Visayas were by Bobby Nalzaro of GMA Cebu and from Mindanao by Tek Ocampo of GMA Davao. By July 11, 2011, its spin-off Balita Pilipinas Ngayon premiered, and was anchored by Mark Salazar and Maki Pulido. The newscast later became as Balita Pilipinas Primetime. It last aired on February 15, 2014.

== Anchors ==
- Arnold Clavio
- Jorge Guerrero (GMA Ilocos)
- CJ Torida (GMA Dagupan)
- Elmer Caseles (GMA Bicol)
- Gerthrode Charlotte Tan (GMA Iloilo)
- Adrian Bobe / Gretchen Varela (GMA Bacolod)
- Bobby Nalzaro (GMA Cebu)
- Joe Legaspina (GMA Northern Mindanao)
- Tek Ocampo (GMA Davao)
- Jennifer Solis (GMA General Santos)
