= Dapat Alam Mo! =

Philippine television news magazine show

- Title card in 2024
- Genre: News magazine
- Directed by: Conrado Lumabas III
- Presented by: Emil Sumangil; Patricia Tumulak; Kim Atienza; Susan Enriquez
- Theme music composer: Simon L. Tan
- Opening theme: "Dapat Alam Mo!" by Khalil Ramos
- Country of origin: Philippines
- Original language: Tagalog

Production
- Production locations: Studio 2, GMA Network Center, Quezon City, Philippines
- Camera setup: Multiple-camera setup
- Running time: 60 minutes
- Production companies: GMA Public Affairs; GMA Integrated News

Original release
- Network: GTV; GMA Network (2022)
- Release: October 18, 2021 – October 25, 2024

Dapat Alam Mo! (transl. you should know!) is a Philippine television news magazine show broadcast by GTV and GMA Network. Originally hosted by Emil Sumangil, Patricia Tumulak and Kim Atienza, it premiered on October 18, 2021, on GTV's evening line up. The show also begun airing on GMA Network on February 14, 2022, on the network's Telebabad line up. The show ended its simulcast on GMA Network, on March 18, 2022. The show concluded on October 25, 2024. Atienza and Susan Enriquez served as the final hosts.

The show is streaming online on YouTube.

== Overview ==
Dapat Alam Mo! was announced in September 2021, with Emil Sumangil and Patricia Tumulak revealed as hosts of the show. In September 2021, the hosts were introduced including Kim Atienza.

The show began its provisional simulcast on GMA Network on February 14, 2022, replacing Wowowin. The show ended airing on GMA Network on March 18, 2022. On March 20, 2023, Susan Enriquez, became a regular host. Tumulak would leave the show in October 2023, having been removed from the show's intro and social media pages.

The show aired its final episode on October 25, 2024.

== Hosts ==
Hosts

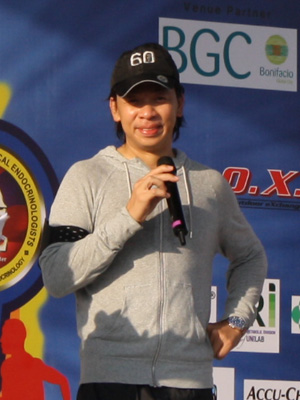
Kim Atienza

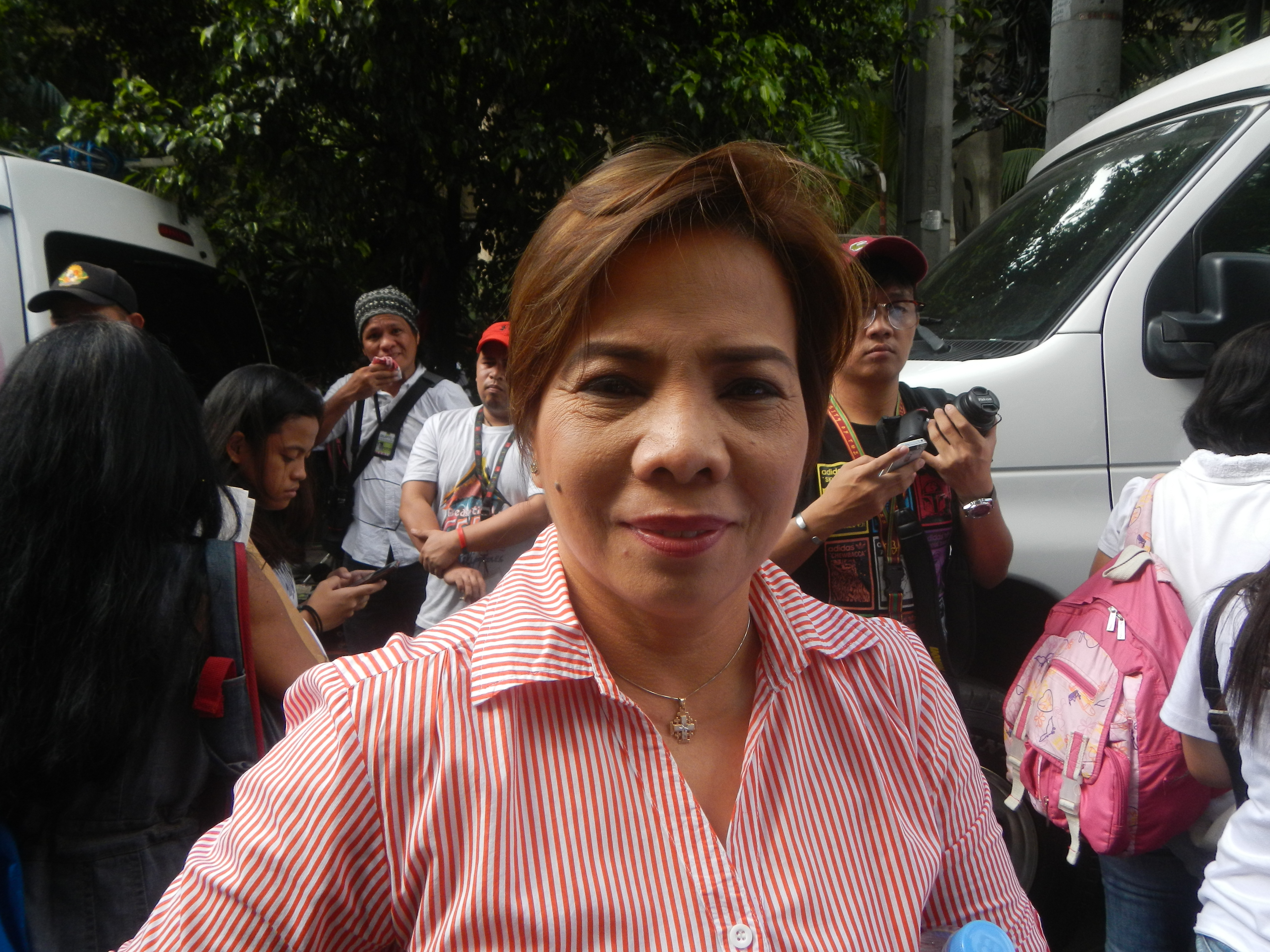
Susan Enriquez

- Kim Atienza
- Emil Sumangil (2021–23)
- Patricia Tumulak (2021–23)
- Susan Enriquez (2023–24)

Guest hosts

- Oscar Oida
- Juancho Triviño
- Anjo Pertierra
- Elle Villanueva

== Segments ==
- Serbisyo on the Spot
- Shout Out
- Kakabakaba
- Take Eat Away
- OMG (Oh My Ganap)
- PaDAM!han
- Patok sa TikTok
- Kim's Fordi
- Kwentong Kalye
- Dami Mong Alam Kuya Kim
- Kay Susan Tayo!
- SuKi
- SWAT (Sumangil, Walang Atrasan)
