= Johnson Tam =

Johnson Tam is the executive producer of the Philippine television program Reporter's Notebook. He is a Filipino documentary producer who works for the Philippine television network GMA Public Affairs. He produced the documentary Pinoy Exodus sa Lebanon which was awarded the Best Current Affairs Program at the 2008 Asian Television Awards.
