= News TV Quick Response Team =

Philippine television news show

- Title card in 2020 to 2021
- Genre: News broadcasting
- Presented by: Jiggy Manicad; Emil Sumangil
- Country of origin: Philippines
- Original language: Tagalog

Production
- Executive producer: Marissa Flores
- Camera setup: Multiple-camera setup
- Running time: 30–45 minutes
- Production company: GMA News and Public Affairs

Original release
- Network: GMA News TV
- Release: August 1, 2011 – January 15, 2021

News TV Quick Response Team is a Philippine television news broadcasting show broadcast by GMA News TV. Originally anchored by Jiggy Manicad, it premiered on August 1, 2011. Emil Sumangil served as the final anchor. The show concluded on January 15, 2021.

== Overview ==
The first news broadcasting program in the Philippine television, in which the anchor is on the scene of the news.

On April 20, 2018, Manicad left the show, to run as a senator on the 2019 Philippine midterm elections. Emil Sumangil served as his replacement.

In March 2020, the production was halted due to the enhanced community quarantine in Luzon caused by the COVID-19 pandemic. The show resumed its programming on September 21, 2020.

== Anchors ==
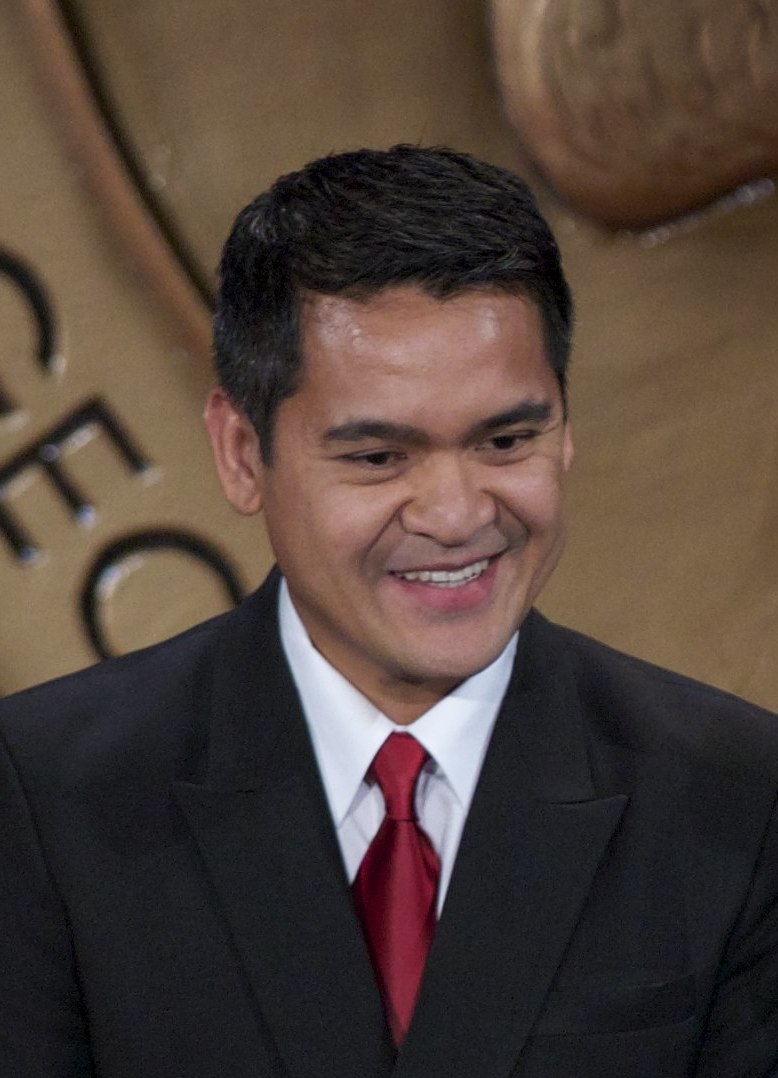
Jiggy Manicad served as an anchor.

- Jiggy Manicad (2011–18)
- Emil Sumangil (2018–21)

Substitute anchors

- Susan Enriquez
- Lala Roque

== Accolades ==
Accolades received by News TV Quick Response Team
Year	Award	Category	Recipient	Result	Ref.
2013	27th PMPC Star Awards for Television	Best Male Newscaster	Jiggy Manicad	Nominated	
2014	Golden Screen TV Awards	Outstanding News Program	"Bagyong Pablo"	Nominated	
2014	Golden Screen TV Awards	Outstanding Male News Presenter	Jiggy Manicad	Nominated	
2014	28th PMPC Star Awards for Television	Best Male Newscaster	Jiggy Manicad	Nominated	
