= Mark Salazar =

Filipino journalist (born 1977)

- Born: Mark Pegenia Salazar; September 26, 1977 (age 48); Manila, Philippines
- Occupations: journalist, newscaster, Television producer, Field reporter
- Years active: 2004–present
- Employer: GMA Network

Mark Pegenia Salazar (Tagalog pronunciation: [sɐlɐˈsaɾ]; born September 26, 1977) is a Filipino journalist, television news producer, newscaster, field reporter, & host. He is currently serving as the co-host of iJuander on GTV and the radio program Usap Tayo: Super Kwentuhan with Mark and Susan on DZBB-AM, both alongside Susan Enriquez.

== Career ==
Salazar started out as a news producer of GMA Network in 2001. He became part of GMA News as a journalist since 2005. He was also an associate producer for 24 Oras Weekend.

He anchored Balita Pilipinas Ngayon with Maki Pulido from 2011 until its conclusion in 2019. Salazar also anchored the weekend edition of Balitanghali with Mav Gonzales, replacing the original anchors Mariz Umali and Jun Veneracion who both left. The weekend newscast was canceled in March 2020 due to the COVID-19 pandemic.

In February 2021, he joined Susan Enriquez as the co-host of iJuander, two years after Enriquez went solo due to the passing of her original co-host, Cesar Apolinario.
