= GMA Public Affairs =

Current affairs division of GMA Network

- Logo of GMA Public Affairs
- Type: Division
- Headquarters: GMA Network Center, Quezon City, Philippines
- Area served: Worldwide
- Key people: Nessa S. Valdellon (Senior Vice President); Arlene U. Carnay (Vice President); Nowell M. Cuanang (Assistant Vice President)
- Parent: GMA Network, Inc.
- Website: gmanetwork.com/news/publicaffairs

GMA Public Affairs is the public affairs division of the Philippine media company GMA Network, Inc. that currently produces and airs documentaries, magazine, television programs, films, anthology, infotainment and other public affairs genre programs and content for free-to-air TV channels (GMA Network and GTV) and online platforms. It later ventured into television series and movie production.

== History ==
GMA's Public Affairs division was established in 1987 when Tina Monzon-Palma, then head of GMA News, recognized that a 30-minute newscast was not adequate and sufficient to inform the general Filipino public on what is happening to the recently established Aquino government after the historic People Power Revolution in February 1986.

The public affairs division started with five news personnel including Marissa La Torre-Flores (who would later lead GMA News and Public Affairs as its senior vice president until 2022). The division office was located inside the cameramen's locker room before moving into the state-of-the-art GMA Network Center. Inexperienced, the division broadcast with a camera and an improvised set at the old GMA building in EDSA. Today this division, with more than 500 news personnel—both locally based and with international assignments—have 16 of the most awarded programs on Philippine television today.

Weekend with Velez was the first network-produced public affairs program on GMA, afterward renamed Velez This Week and was hosted by Jose Mari Velez.

Initially a makeshift and improvised set, the once GMA News and Public Affairs gained several honors and recognitions from local and international award-giving bodies, including two gold medals in the New York Festivals and their first Peabody Award in 1999.

Coinciding with its 20th anniversary in broadcasting excellence, GMA News and Public Affairs aired a documentary entitled 20: Dalawampung Taon ng GMA Public Affairs (20: Twenty Years of GMA Public Affairs) on October 28, 2007.

On April 27, 2020, GMA News and Public Affairs Digital launched a podcast channel available on Spotify and Apple Podcasts.

Effective October 2022, as Flores stepped down in retirement as SVP of News and Public Affairs, GMA News rebranded as "GMA Integrated News" with the appointment of Oliver Victor Amoroso as its head/SVP, splitting GMA News and Public Affairs into two distinct departments. GMA Public Affairs retained its name with Nessa Valdellon currently heading the department as its First Vice President (FVP). GMA Integrated News reverted back to "GMA News" in March 2026.

== Accolades ==
In 1999, George Foster Peabody Award recognized the documentaries "Kidneys for Sale" and "Kamao" by Jessica Soho and the I-Witness team and Jay Taruc's child labor story on Brigada Siete. On December 9, 2003, the Philippine House of Representatives 12th Congress commended GMA News and Public Affairs through Resolution 787 authored by Rep. Rodolfo Plaza for its efforts in uplifting the standards of the Philippine broadcast industry by receiving the first Peabody Award for television news awarded to an Asian country in 1999.

In 2010, Kara David's I-Witness documentary, "Ambulansiyang de Paa," won GMA News and Public Affairs second Peabody Award. GMA News TV's documentary program Reel Time's "Salat" episode received a Peabody Award in 2013. In 2014, Peabody awards recognized Kapuso Mo, Jessica Soho and four GMA News programs State of the Nation with Jessica Soho, 24 Oras, Saksi, 24 Oras Weekend for its coverage of the Super Typhoon Yolanda (Haiyan).

== Programs ==
=== Currently aired TV programs ===
GMA Network

- Barangay Love Stories
- Born to Be Wild
- Dami Mong Alam, Kuya Kim!
- I-Witness
- Kapuso Mo, Jessica Soho
- Pera Paraan
- Pinoy M.D.
- Reporter's Notebook
- Resibo: Walang Lusot ang May Atraso
- Tadhana
- The Atom Araullo Specials
- Unang Hirit (co-production with GMA News)
GTV
- Biyahe ni Drew
- Good News Kasama si Vicky Morales
- iJuander
- Kapuso Mo, Jessica Soho
- Pinas Sarap

== List of films ==
- The Cheating Game (2023; co-produced with GMA Pictures)
- Firefly (2023; co-produced with GMA Pictures)
- Lost Sabungeros (2024; co-produced with GMA Pictures)
- Green Bones (2024; co-produced with GMA Pictures, distributed by Sony Pictures Releasing International via Columbia Pictures label)
- P77 (2025; co-produced with GMA Pictures, distributed by Warner Bros. Pictures)
- KMJS Gabi ng Lagim: The Movie (2025; co-produced with GMA Pictures, distributed by Sony Pictures Releasing International via Columbia Pictures label)

== List of drama series ==
- Titser (2013)
- Katipunan (2013)
- Sa Puso ni Dok (2014)
- Ilustrado (2014)
- Dangwa (2015)
- D' Originals (2017)
- I Heart Davao (2017)
- My Guitar Princess (2018)
- Inday Will Always Love You (2018)
- TODA One I Love (2019)
- One of the Baes (2019–2020)
- The Lost Recipe (2021)
- Owe My Love (2021)
- Love You Stranger (2022)
- Lolong (2022–2025)
- The Write One (2023)
- Zero Kilometers Away (2023)
- In My Dreams (2023)
- Black Rider (2023–2024)
- Makiling (2024)
- Recipes of Love (2024)
- Maka (2024–2025)
- My Ilonggo Girl (2025)
- Beauty Empire (2025)
- Maka Lovestream (2025)
- You're My Favorite Song (2026)

== Presenters ==
=== Program presenters ===
Presenter	Program/s	Notes
Jessica Soho	Kapuso Mo, Jessica Soho	
Vicky Morales	Wish Ko Lang!, Good News Kasama si Vicky Morales	Also part of GMA News as co-anchor of 24 Oras
Arnold Clavio	Unang Hirit	Also part of GMA News as co-anchor of Unang Balita sa Unang Hirit
Howie Severino	I-Witness	Also part of GMA News as consultant, podcast host and GMA News Online as editor-at-large
Kara David	I-Witness, Pinas Sarap	Also part of GMA News as anchor
Sandra Aguinaldo	I-Witness	Also part of GMA News as news correspondent
Atom Araullo	I-Witness, The Atom Araullo Specials	Also part of GMA News as anchor of State of the Nation
Drew Arellano	Biyahe ni Drew	
Connie Sison	Pinoy M.D.	Also part of GMA News as co-anchor of Balitanghali
Susan Enriquez	IJuander, Pera Paraan, Unang Hirit	Also part of GMA News as news correspondent and co-anchor of Unang Balita sa Unang Hirit
Empoy Marquez	IJuander	
Suzi Entrata-Abrera	Unang Hirit	
Lyn Ching-Pascual	Unang Hirit	
Ivan Mayrina	Unang Hirit	Also part of GMA News as news correspondent and co-anchor of Unang Balita sa Unang Hirit and 24 Oras Weekend
Mariz Umali	Unang Hirit	Also part of GMA News as news correspondent and co-anchor of Unang Balita sa Unang Hirit
Mav Gonzales	I-Witness	Also part of GMA News as news correspondent
John Consulta	I-Witness	Also part of GMA News as news correspondent
Ferds Recio	Born to Be Wild	
Nielsen Donato	Born to Be Wild	
Maki Pulido	Reporter's Notebook	Also part of GMA News as news correspondent
Jun Veneracion	Reporter's Notebook	Also part of GMA News as news correspondent
Marian Rivera	Tadhana	
Emil Sumangil	Resibo: Walang Lusot ang May Atraso	Also part of GMA News as news correspondent and co-anchor of 24 Oras
Kim Atienza	Dami Mong Alam, Kuya Kim!	Also part of GMA News as segment host in 24 Oras and GMA Entertainment Group as host of TiktoClock
