= Balita Pilipinas Ngayon =

Philippine television news show

- Title card
- Genre: News broadcasting
- Directed by: Noel Cabacungan
- Presented by: Maki Pulido; Mark Salazar
- Country of origin: Philippines
- Original language: Tagalog

Production
- Executive producer: Nielsen Ocampo
- Production locations: Studio 2, GMA Network Center, Quezon City, Philippines
- Camera setup: Multiple-camera setup
- Running time: 45 minutes
- Production company: GMA News and Public Affairs

Original release
- Network: GMA News TV
- Release: July 11, 2011 – May 31, 2019

Balita Pilipinas Ngayon (transl. news Philippines now) is a Philippine television news broadcasting show broadcast by GMA News TV. Anchored by Maki Pulido and Mark Salazar, it premiered on July 11, 2011. The show concluded on May 31, 2019.

== Overview ==
Serving as the spin-off of Balita Pilipinas (later Balita Pilipinas Primetime), it was anchored by Maki Pulido and Mark Salazar, with its regional reporters from GMA stations in Luzon, Visayas and Mindanao. The newscast featured headlines from the different regions of the Philippines.
