= Susan Enriquez =

Filipino journalist and host (born 1962)

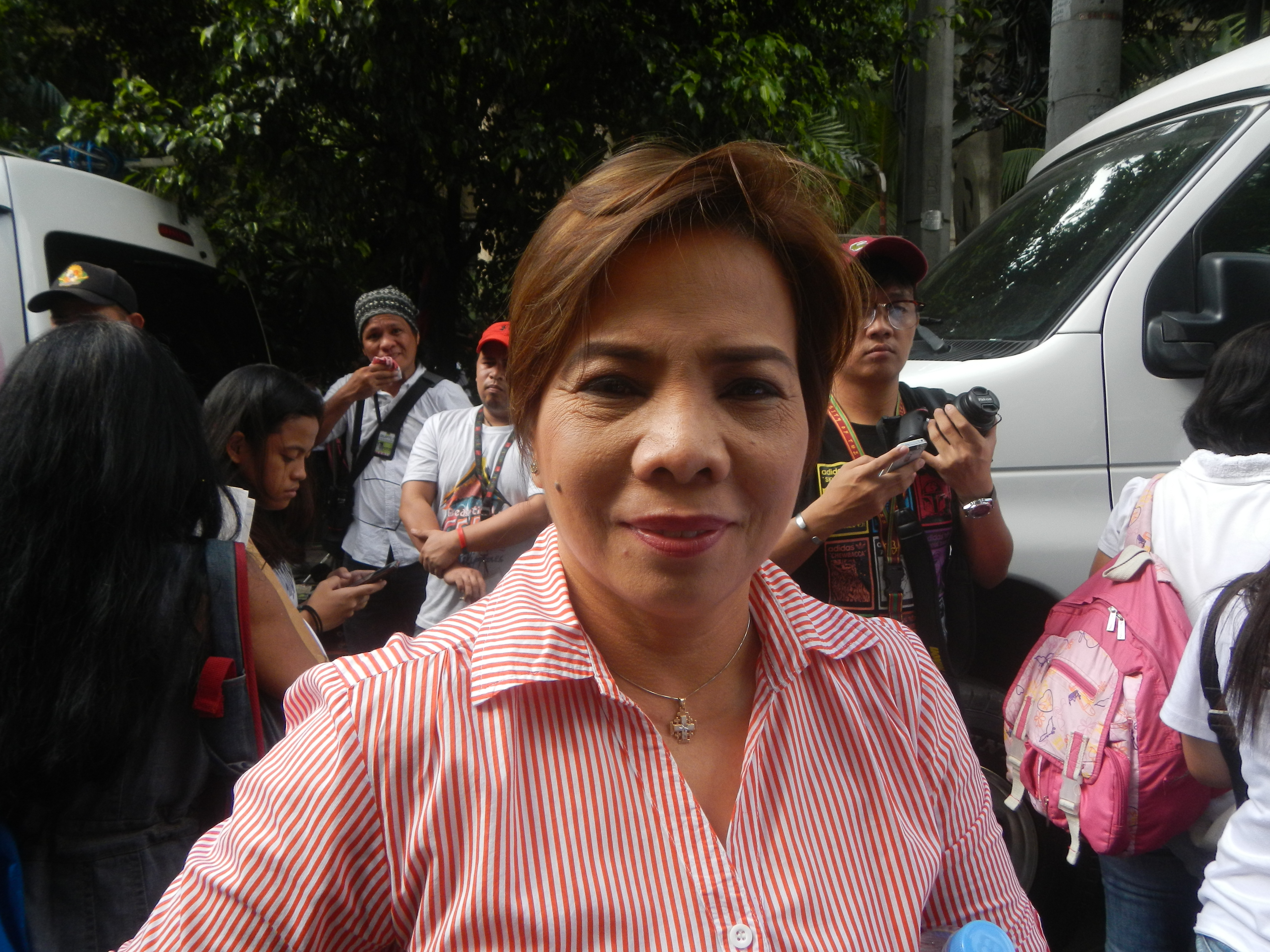
- Enriquez in 2016
- Born: Susan Sevillo; May 24, 1962 (age 64); Legazpi, Albay, Philippines
- Education: Lyceum of the Philippines University
- Occupations: Journalist; television and radio host; news presenter
- Years active: 1981–present
- Employer: GMA Network
- Television: Kay Susan Tayo!; Unang Hirit; IJuander; Kape at Balita; Pera Paraan; Dapat Alam Mo!

Susan Sevillo (born May 24, 1962) is a Filipina journalist, radio and television host, and news presenter. She is notable for her 2003 program Kay Susan Tayo! on GMA Network. Enriquez currently hosts Pera Paraan and co-hosts Unang Hirit on GMA; while on GTV, she also co-hosts iJuander with Mark Salazar.

== Background ==
Enriquez came from a poor family and as a child, she dreamed of becoming a factory worker. She earned a scholarship and extra income from helping in her mother's eatery for her studies towards a bachelor's degree in journalism at Lyceum of the Philippines University. She graduated in 1986. Her surname "Enriquez" is from her former marriage which was annulled. She has a daughter with her former husband.

== Radio ==
She started working at IBC Radio and became a voice talent in 1981 for DZBB Newscoop. In 1989, she was hired as production assistant and writer for DZBB. She then hosted Kay Susan Na!, an infotainment radio program in DZBB that aired from 11:00 am until 12:00 noon.

Enriquez also hosted DZBB programs which were also aired on Dobol B sa News TV such as Easy Easy Lang and Kay Susan Tayo! sa Radyo.

== Television career ==
=== GMA News ===
Enriquez became a TV news reporter for GMA News. In 1990, she was a reporter for GMA News Live, an hourly news update. Her first TV appearance was met with criticism from the audience for her lack of makeup and messy hair, a practice she said that was not required during her radio stint. Her reports appeared in Saksi and 24 Oras.

=== Kay Susan Tayo! ===
Started in 2003, she hosted the TV show Kay Susan Tayo! on GMA Network. The program was described as a lifestyle show with "informative but also entertaining content." The program ran for six years. It won a Catholic Mass Media Awards' Best Informative Show award.

=== Unang Hirit ===
In 2010, Enriquez was one of the hosts in the morning TV show Unang Hirit. She returned to the program in 2013.

=== iJuander ===
She is one of the original hosts of news magazine show, iJuander since 2011. The show's format centered on Filipino identity, folklore, beliefs, and cuisine and earned the Anak TV Seal on the same year it premiered. Enriquez went solo after her original co-host, Cesar Apolinario died in December 2019. Later on, her fellow reporter Mark Salazar (from 2021 to 2023), and then actor-comedian Empoy Marquez (since 2024) respectively became her co-hosts.

=== Other programs ===
On October 22, 2012, she hosted GMA News TV's morning show Kape at Balita together with Joel Reyes Zobel, Mariz Umali, and Michael Fajatin. In addition, she was part of i-Witness creating documentaries and Emergency hosted by Arnold Clavio.

Aside from iJuander, Enriquez is currently serving as the host of Pera Paraan since it premiered on July 22, 2020, via GMA News TV. It was originally a part of the New Normal: The Survival Guide line-up by GMA Public Affairs. The show was carried over when GMA News TV was rebranded to GTV. It later moved to GMA on October 16, 2021.

On March 20, 2023, Enriquez replaced Emil Sumangil as one of the hosts in the news magazine program, Dapat Alam Mo! after the latter focused on his anchoring duties in 24 Oras and hosting Resibo: Walang Lusot ang May Atraso.

== Captivity ==
Enriquez was one of a group of journalists, kidnapped by Abu Sayyaf while working in Basilan on April 20, 2000. While other journalists were freed, she allegedly remained behind because one of the leaders was infatuated with her and planned to make her a spouse. Her release was made possible through the help of Noli de Castro.

== Recognition ==
Ricky Lo of The Philippine Star wrote, "Since she is in our consciousness seemingly every hour on the hour from early morning to sometimes late at night when she pinch-hits for colleagues on leave, Susan Enriquez has become every household’s lovable companion who proves that big things indeed come in small packages." B. Allie Tah of Rappler also said, "Through the years, she has been consistent with her public persona as a warm and simple TV personality with a comprehensive, no-nonsense dedication in her trade of broadcast journalism." Isah V. Red wrote in Manila Standard, "Enriquez is known on TV as "Boses ng Masa." She is an accommodating news personality, especially among housewives who approach her for consumer problems, domestic concerns and barangay issues. They see her as their champion."

== Awards ==
Year	Award giving body	Category	Nominated work	Results
2013	Golden Screen TV Awards	Outstanding Magazine TV Host	iJuander with Cesar Apolinario	Won
2013	PMPC Star Awards for Television	Best Morning Show Host	Unang Hirit	Won
2014	PMPC Star Awards for Television	Best Magazine Show Host	iJuander	Won
2015	PMPC Star Awards for Television	Best Morning Show Host	Unang Hirit	Won
2017	Gawad Filipino Year-End Awards	Best Female News and Public Affairs Host	—N/a	Won
2017	15th Gawad Tanglaw Awards	Best Female Radio Anchor	—N/a	Won
2018	PMPC Star Awards for Television	Best Morning Show Host	Unang Hirit	Won
2019	Gawad Filipino Women's Month Awards	Natatanging Filipina sa Larangan ng Pagbabalita	—N/a	Won
2019	Rotary Club of Manila Journalism Awards	Television Broadcaster of the Year	—N/a	Won

== See also ==
- List of kidnappings
