= Nathaniel Cruz =

Filipino meteorologist (born 1960)

- Born: Nathaniel Augustin Cruz; February 22, 1960 (age 66); Manila, Philippines
- Other name: Mang Tani
- Education: Gregorio Araneta University; University of the Philippines Diliman
- Occupations: Meteorologist; television host; radio host
- Years active: 1982–2022
- Employers: PAGASA (1983–2010); Bureau of Meteorology (2010–2012); GMA Integrated News/GMA Public Affairs (2012–2022)
- Spouse: Gloria Cruz

Nathaniel Augustin Cruz (Tagalog: [ˈkɾus]; born February 22, 1960), more popularly known as Mang Tani, is a Filipino meteorologist who formerly served as a meteorologist for PAGASA from 1982 to 2010. Cruz is also the former resident meteorologist of GMA News and a co-host of the network's morning show, Unang Hirit, from 2012 to 2022.

== Early life and education ==
Nathaniel Agustin Cruz was born in Manila on February 22, 1960, to Ernesto de la Merced Cruz and Cecilia Sanchez Agustin.

He studied agricultural engineering at the Gregorio Araneta University and later graduated in 1981. After his graduation from the Gregorio Araneta University in 1981, Cruz earned a Master of Science degree in meteorology at the University of the Philippines Diliman in 1999.

== Career ==
After his graduation from the University of the Philippines Diliman in 1982, Cruz joined the Philippine Atmospheric, Geophysical and Astronomical Services Administration (PAGASA) as meteorologist and spokesperson; he also worked for the agency's hydrology division. Cruz was later promoted in 2004 as officer-in-charge of the Office of the Deputy Administratator until his retirement in July 2010.

In 1989, Cruz went on a temporary leave from PAGASA for the first time and worked for Arab-American Oil Company in Saudi Arabia.

In 2008, Cruz temporarily worked for the Asian Disaster Preparedness Center (ADPC) in Bangkok, Thailand as a climatologist.

Cruz went to Darwin, Australia in July 2010, to join the Bureau of Meteorology (BOM) as a meteorologist, but left the country in 2012 due to the illness of his wife Gloria Cruz.

On June 4, 2012, Cruz returned to the Philippines and joined the weather department of GMA News as the network's resident meteorologist, mainly appearing on the flagship news programs Unang Hirit and 24 Oras; occasionally he appears on other GMA News programs when typhoons within the Philippine Area of Responsibility (PAR) is expected to make landfall. Cruz presented the science magazine program Hamon ng Kalikasan on GMA News TV, from September until December 2012; and also the radio program I.M. Ready sa Dobol B on DZBB, since 2017.

In an exchange during the weather segment of Balitanghali on July 21, 2018, news anchor Jun Veneracion asked Cruz about further updates regarding Tropical Depression Josie, on which Cruz responded and mistakenly called Veneracion "Josie" and noticeably struggled to contain his laughter afterwards. The clip went viral after the incident, and in an Instagram post by Unang Hirit anchor Arnold Clavio, Cruz responded and explained that he was concentrated on the storm and got confused with the names.

In 2021, Cruz went on a temporary leave from both Unang Hirit and 24 Oras, as he went on vacation in Melbourne, Australia, while he still does some remote work as the weather forecaster of GMA News.

== Personal life ==
He married Gloria Cruz. As of 2021, Cruz and his family resides in Melbourne, Australia. His life story was featured on the GMA drama anthology shows Magpakailanman and Wagas, where both highlighted how his wife survived a brain tumor despite doctors describing the situation as a "hopeless case"

== Credits ==
=== Television ===
Year	Title	Notes	Refs.
2012–2022	Unang Hirit	Co-host, weather presenter	
2012–2022	24 Oras	Weather presenter	
2012	Hamon ng Kalikasan	Host	
2013	Magpakailanman: The Nathaniel "Mang Tani" Cruz Story	Featured guest	
2014	Wagas	Featured guest	
2016	Sunday PinaSaya	Guest	
2017	Eat Bulaga!: Jackpot en Poy	Contestant, guest	
2020	Eat Bulaga!: Bawal Judgmental	Contestant, guest	
2021	Eat Bulaga!: Cash Landing On You	Contestant, guest	

=== Web ===
Year	Title	Notes	Ref.
2014	Magtanong Kay Mang Tani	Host	
2022	Weather Update with Mang Tani	Host	

== Radio ==
Year	Title	Notes	Ref.
2017–2021	I.M. Ready sa Dobol B	Host	
