= Hamon ng Kalikasan =

Philippine television news magazine show

- Title card
- Genre: News magazine
- Presented by: Nathaniel Cruz
- Country of origin: Philippines
- Original language: Tagalog

Production
- Executive producer: Tonirose C. Pua
- Camera setup: Multiple-camera setup
- Running time: 30 minutes
- Production company: GMA News and Public Affairs

Original release
- Network: GMA News TV
- Release: September 20 – December 13, 2012

Hamon ng Kalikasan (transl. challenge of nature) is a 2012 Philippine television news magazine show broadcast by GMA News TV. Hosted by Nathaniel Cruz, it premiered on September 20, 2012.

The show concluded on December 13, 2012.

== Overview ==
The program features some of the natural phenomena that experienced in the Philippines and around the world.
