= Emil Sumangil =

Filipino journalist and broadcaster

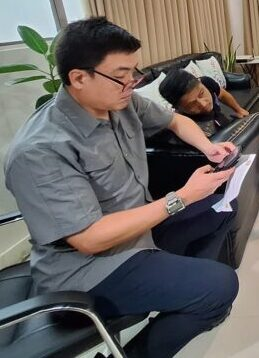
- Sumangil in 2024
- Born: November 23, 1978 (age 47)
- Occupations: News anchor; journalist
- Years active: 2001–present
- Employers: ABS-CBN Corporation (2001–2004); GMA Network (2004–present)
- Spouse: Michelle Tolentino (m. 2005)
- Children: 2

Emil Sumangil (born November 23, 1978) is a Filipino journalist broadcaster and TV host known primarily for his work on scoops about criminal activities, he first anchored the newscast News TV Quick Response Team in 2018 before co-hosting the magazine show Dapat Alam Mo! three years later. In 2023, Sumangil joined the newscast 24 Oras as a regular anchor and had his own investigative public service show, Resibo: Walang Lusot ang May Atraso.

== Career ==
Sumangil was a production assistant and researcher of ABS-CBN News and Current Affairs for three years, before moving to GMA Network in 2004 as a writer and producer of GMA Public Affairs programs' segments. He eventually reassigned to a field journalist covering criminal activities exclusively, drawing inspiration from then-GMA News reporter Michael Fajatin. Sumangil's scoops particularly included the newscast 24 Oras's "Justiis: Condominium Behind Bars", which focused on Santa Rosa City District Jail's crowds. It received a nomination for a Golden Nymph Award. In 2017, he contributed the "Sa Pusod ng Digmaan" documentary in i-Witness.

News TV Quick Response Team, a newscast in which an anchor was "on-the-scene" within the present-day events, marked Sumangil's first anchoring stint in 2018. With his blessing, he replaced Jiggy Manicad, who left the network to run for senator in 2019. Sumangil co-hosted the magazine program Dapat Alam Mo! from 2021 to 2023, alongside Kim Atienza and Patricia Tumulak. Program manager Mon Torres assigned Sumangil after News TV Quick Response Team was ended due to GMA News TV's programming changes caused by the COVID-19 pandemic. Drawing from his music hobby, as well as given his traditional occupation, Sumangil stated that he had a unique persona for the program.

In May 2023, Sumangil hosted the investigative public service show Resibo: Walang Lusot ang May Atraso. As his first solo program, it focuses on giving a resolution of community problems in the Philippines. Sumangil had doubts about becoming a successor to broadcaster Mike Enriquez. (Note: Attributed to multiple references:) He joined 24 Oras as a regular anchor in November 2023. During Enriquez's medical leave before his death, Sumangil temporarily worked on the newscast, and thought that this could prepare him for an opportunity to pursue it permanently. He accepted the offer after having newscasting lessons. Sumangil described his position on 24 Oras as an aspiration during his early career.

== Personal life ==
Sumangil is married to Michelle Tolentino, and have two children. He serves as a reader at a Roman Catholic parish in Mandaluyong.

== Television programs ==
Emil Sumangil's television credits
Year	Title	Notes	Ref.
2004	24 sa 2004: GMA News & Public Affairs Year-End Report	Year-end special, "Huli-Cam" segment	
2017	i-Witness	Episode: "Sa Pusod ng Digmaan"	
2018–2021	News TV Quick Response Team		
2020–present	Super Balita sa Umaga Nationwide	Saturday edition, part of Dobol B TV	
2021–2023	Dapat Alam Mo!		
2023–present	Resibo: Walang Lusot ang May Atraso		
2023	Secret Slaves: A Jessica Soho Special Report on Human Trafficking	Television special	
2023–present	24 Oras		
2025	Bubble Gang	Episode: "BG30: Batang Bubble Ako two-part anniversary special"	

== Awards and nominations ==
Awards and nominations received by Emil Sumangil
Award	Year (Note: Indicates the year of ceremony)	Category	Nominated work	Result	Ref.
PMPC Star Awards for Television	2025	Best Male Newscaster	24 Oras	Nominated	
PMPC Star Awards for Television	2025	Best Public Service Program Host	Resibo: Walang Lusot ang May Atraso	Nominated	
