= IJuander =

Philippine television news magazine show

iJuander
- Title card since 2024
- Genre: News magazine
- Presented by: Susan Enriquez; Cesar Apolinario; Mark Salazar; Empoy Marquez
- Country of origin: Philippines
- Original language: Tagalog

Production
- Camera setup: Multiple-camera setup
- Running time: 40 minutes
- Production company: GMA Public Affairs

Original release
- Network: GMA News TV (2011–21); GTV (since 2021)
- Release: February 28, 2011 – present

iJuander is a Philippine television news magazine show broadcast by GMA News TV and GTV. Originally hosted by Susan Enriquez and Cesar Apolinario, it premiered on February 28, 2011. Enriquez and Empoy Marquez currently serve as the hosts.

== Hosts ==
Hosts

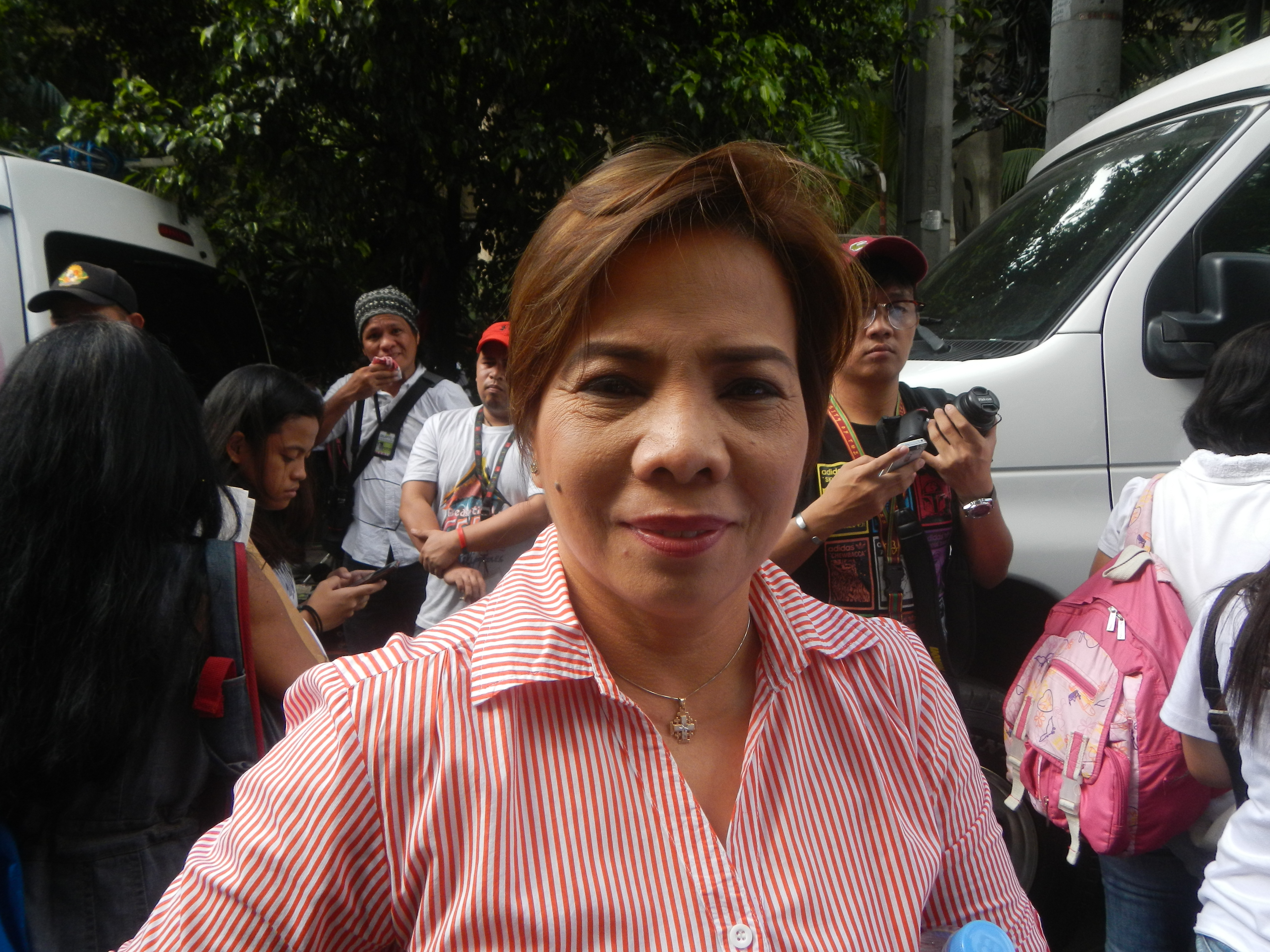
Susan Enriquez

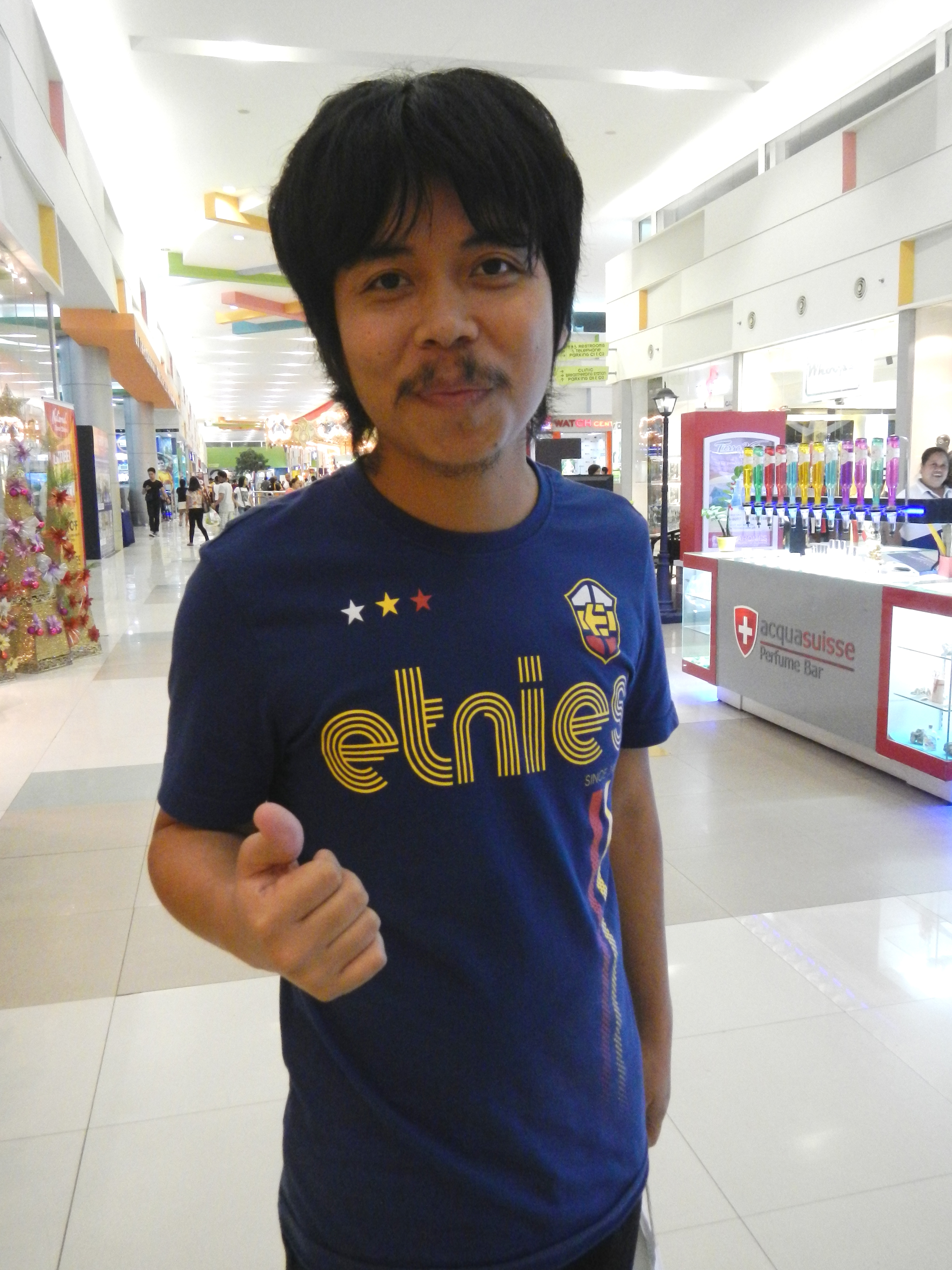
Empoy Marquez

- Susan Enriquez
- Empoy Marquez (since 2024)

Former hosts

- Cesar Apolinario (2011–19)
- Mark Salazar (2021–23)

== Overview ==
iJuander showcases aspects of Philippine culture such as beliefs, traditions, mysteries, folklore and cuisine

In February 2021, GMA News TV was rebranded as GTV, with the show being carried over.

== Production ==
The production was halted in March 2020 due to the enhanced community quarantine in Luzon caused by the COVID-19 pandemic. The show resumed its programming on September 20, 2020.

== Accolades ==
Accolades received by iJuander
Year	Award	Category	Recipient	Result	Ref.
2011	Golden Screen TV Awards	Outstanding Magazine Program	iJuander	Nominated	
2011	Golden Screen TV Awards	Outstanding Magazine Program Host	Cesar Apolinario Susan Enriquez	Nominated	
2012	26th PMPC Star Awards for Television	Best Magazine Show Host	Cesar Apolinario Susan Enriquez	Nominated	
2013	Golden Screen TV Awards	Outstanding Magazine TV Program	iJuander	Won	
2013	Golden Screen TV Awards	Outstanding Magazine TV Hosts	Susan Enriquez Cesar Apolinario	Won	
2013	27th PMPC Star Awards for Television	Best Magazine Show	iJuander	Won	
2013	27th PMPC Star Awards for Television	Best Magazine Show Host	Susan Enriquez Cesar Apolinario	Nominated	
2013	7th UPLB Isko’t Iska's Broadcast Choice Awards	Best Youth-Oriented Program	iJuander	Won	
2014	Golden Screen TV Awards	Outstanding Magazine Program	"Makabayan Pa Ba Si Juan, o Mas Makabayan Pa Ang Mga Dayuhan"	Nominated	
2014	Golden Screen TV Awards	Outstanding Magazine Program Host	Susan Enriquez Cesar Apolinario	Nominated	
2014	28th PMPC Star Awards for Television	Best Magazine Show	iJuander	Won	
2014	28th PMPC Star Awards for Television	Best Magazine Show Host	Cesar Apolinario Susan Enriquez	Won	
2015	29th PMPC Star Awards for Television	Best Magazine Show	iJuander	Nominated	
2015	29th PMPC Star Awards for Television	Best Magazine Show Host	Cesar Apolinario Susan Enriquez	Nominated	
2016	30th PMPC Star Awards for Television	Best Magazine Show	iJuander	Nominated	
2016	30th PMPC Star Awards for Television	Best Magazine Show Host	Cesar Apolinario Susan Enriquez	Nominated	
2017	31st PMPC Star Awards for Television	Best Magazine Show	iJuander	Nominated	
2017	31st PMPC Star Awards for Television	Best Magazine Show Host	Cesar Apolinario Susan Enriquez	Nominated	
2018	32nd PMPC Star Awards for Television	Best Magazine Show	iJuander	Nominated	
2018	32nd PMPC Star Awards for Television	Best Magazine Show Host	Cesar Apolinario Susan Enriquez	Nominated	
2019	33rd PMPC Star Awards for Television	Best Magazine Show	iJuander	Nominated	
2019	33rd PMPC Star Awards for Television	Best Magazine Show Host	Cesar Apolinario Susan Enriquez	Nominated	
2023	35th PMPC Star Awards for Television	Best Magazine Show	iJuander	Nominated	
2023	35th PMPC Star Awards for Television	Best Magazine Show Host	Susan Enriquez Mark Salazar	Won	
2023	45th Catholic Mass Media Awards	Best Adult Educational/Cultural Program	iJuander	Won	
2025	37th PMPC Star Awards for Television	Best Documentary Program	iJuander	Nominated	
2025	37th PMPC Star Awards for Television	Best Documentary Program Host	Susan Enriquez Mark Salazar	Nominated	
2025	38th PMPC Star Awards for Television	Best Magazine Show	iJuander	Pending	
2025	38th PMPC Star Awards for Television	Best Magazine Show Host	Susan Enriquez Empoy Marquez	Pending	
