= Kay Susan Tayo! =

Philippine television infotainment show

- Title card
- Genre: Infotainment; Public affairs
- Written by: Elmer Gatchalian
- Directed by: Rachel Arias
- Presented by: Susan Enriquez
- Theme music composer: Gary Granada; Elmer Gatchalian
- Opening theme: "Kay Susan Tayo"
- Country of origin: Philippines
- Original language: Tagalog
- No. of episodes: 309

Production
- Executive producer: Rachel Arias
- Editors: Bennie Pagayatan; Bunny Sison; Carol Eguaras
- Camera setup: Multiple-camera setup
- Running time: 16–32 minutes
- Production company: GMA News and Public Affairs

Original release
- Network: GMA Network
- Release: November 30, 2003 – October 25, 2009

Kay Susan Tayo! (transl. we are with Susan!) is a Philippine television infotainment public affairs show broadcast by GMA Network. Hosted by Susan Enriquez, it premiered on November 30, 2003, on the network's morning line up. The show concluded on October 25, 2009, with a total of 309 episodes.

The show is streaming online on YouTube.

== Ratings ==
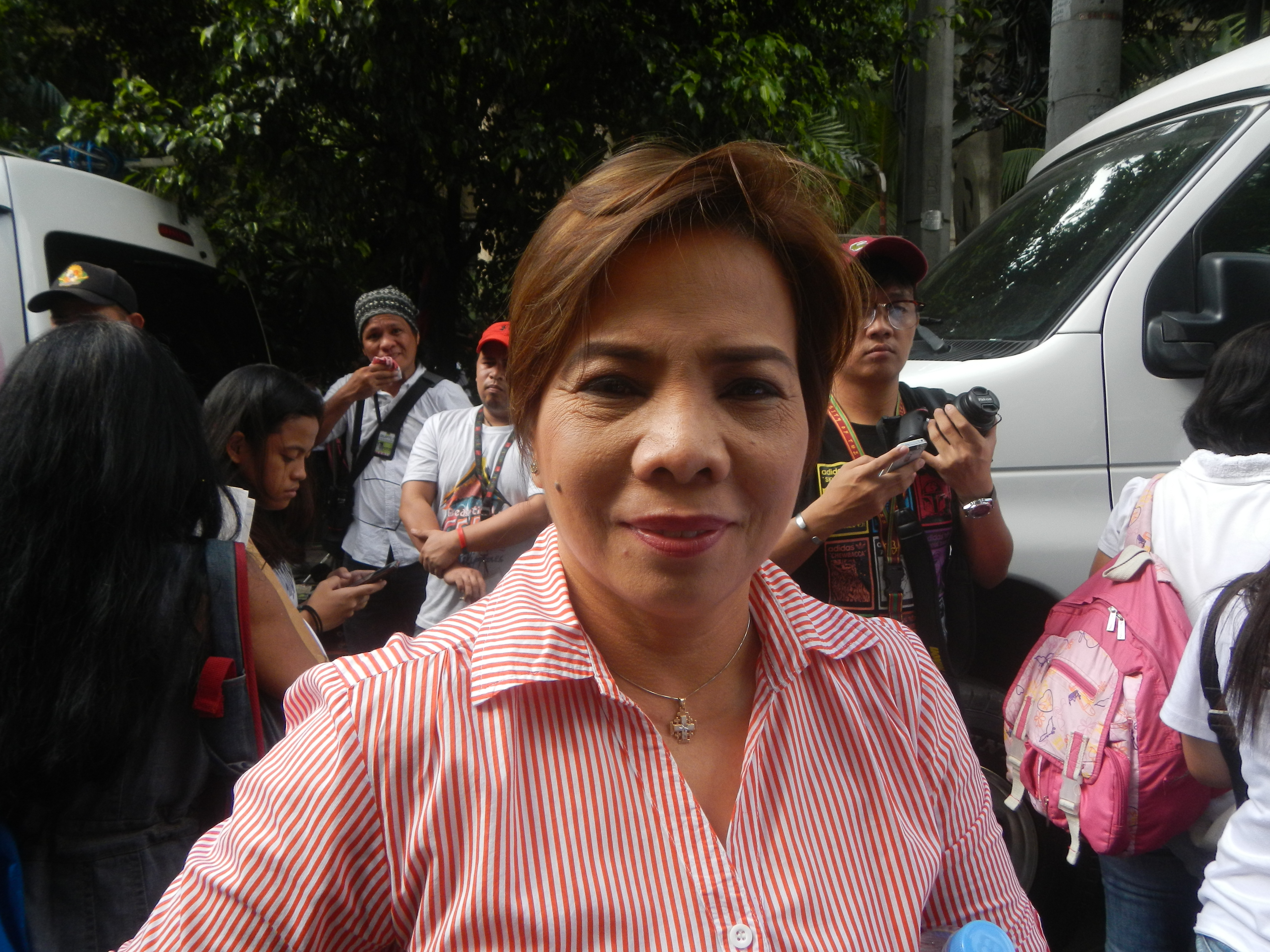
Susan Enriquez serves as a host.

According to AGB Nielsen Philippines' Mega Manila household television ratings, the final episode of Kay Susan Tayo! scored a 7.8% rating.

== Accolades ==
Accolades received by Kay Susan Tayo!
Year	Award	Category	Recipient	Result	Ref.
2003	Catholic Mass Media Awards	Best Informative Show	Kay Susan Tayo	Nominated	
2004	Anak TV Seal Awards	Anak TV Seal	Kay Susan Tayo	Won	
2004	Catholic Mass Media Awards	Best Informative Show	Kay Susan Tayo	Nominated	
2005	Catholic Mass Media Awards	Best Informative Show	Kay Susan Tayo	Nominated	
2005	19th PMPC Star Awards for Television	Best Lifestyle Show	Kay Susan Tayo	Nominated	
2005	19th PMPC Star Awards for Television	Best Lifestyle Show Host	Susan Enriquez	Nominated	
2006	Catholic Mass Media Awards	Best Informative Show	Kay Susan Tayo	Nominated	
2006	20th PMPC Star Awards for Television	Best Lifestyle Show	Kay Susan Tayo	Nominated	
2006	20th PMPC Star Awards for Television	Best Lifestyle Show Host	Susan Enriquez	Nominated	
2007	Catholic Mass Media Awards	Best Informative Show	Kay Susan Tayo	Nominated	
2007	21st PMPC Star Awards for Television	Best Lifestyle Show	Kay Susan Tayo	Nominated	
2007	21st PMPC Star Awards for Television	Best Lifestyle Show Host	Susan Enriquez	Nominated	
2008	Anak TV Seal Awards		Kay Susan Tayo	Won	
2008	Catholic Mass Media Awards	Best Informative Show	Kay Susan Tayo	Nominated	
2008	22nd PMPC Star Awards for Television	Best Lifestyle Show	Kay Susan Tayo	Nominated	
2008	22nd PMPC Star Awards for Television	Best Lifestyle Show Host	Susan Enriquez	Nominated	
2009	Anak TV Seal Awards	Most Well-Liked TV Program	Kay Susan Tayo	Included	
2010	24th PMPC Star Awards for Television	Best Lifestyle Show	Kay Susan Tayo	Nominated	
2010	24th PMPC Star Awards for Television	Best Lifestyle Show Host	Susan Enriquez	Nominated	
