= Digify (company) =

- Type: Media company
- Industry: Entertainment, Media
- Founded: 2000
- Headquarters: GMA Network Center, EDSA cor. Timog Avenue, Quezon City, Philippines
- Products: Web Services, Mobile Applications, Online Games
- Owner: GMA Network Inc.
- Parent: GMA New Media

Digify Inc. is a subsidiary of GMA New Media founded in 2011, which specializes stand-alone digital and integrated marketing campaigns for mobile, web, and broadcast applications.

Digify holds several key accounts, including SM Prime Holdings, Inc., which commissioned the company to develop its SM Supermalls iOS and Android mobile apps. Digify is also a partner of Samsung Electronics Philippines Corporation (SEPCO) as it powered all the interactive displays in SEPCO-sponsored museum exhibits, including Yuchengco Museum's Relative Realities exhibit.

Its headquarters are located at the GMA Network Center in Quezon City, Philippines. In July 2014, Digify mobile app gained local and international recognition

== Products and services ==
Products and services offered by Digify include augmented reality for mobile, desktop and kiosks; mobile app design and development for iOS and Android; game design and development; audio-visual production services; web design and development (HTML5); Facebook app design and development; mobile-related services (SMS Promos, etc.); customized QR services; location-based services; online display ad production; and projection-mapping services.

=== Mobile applications ===
- Almost Real
- AR Scanner - Augmented Reality
  - AR Scanner for Mini Devices
- Del Monte Kitchenomics (Application developed for GMA Marketing and Productions, Inc. and Del Monte.)
- Culture Explorer (Philippines)
- FACETS (Application developed for Samsung Electronics Philippines Corporation.)
- SM Supermalls Mobile application developed for SM Prime Holdings, Inc. and SM Supermalls.)
- Video AR - Augmented Reality
  - Video AR for Mini Devices

=== Defunct ===
- Cash n' Dash (Application developed for GMA Marketing and Production, Inc.'s Kapuso Milyonaryo Season 5 Level Up Panalo, now part of Kapuso Milyonaryo mobile app.)

== Accolades ==
Year	Award-giving body	Category	Nominated work	Result
2014	Spark Awards for Media Excellence	Best App (Gold award)	Del Monte Kitchenomics	Won
2014	Spark Awards for Media Excellence	Best Use of Branded Content (Gold award)	Del Monte Kitchenomics	Won
2014	Spark Awards for Media Excellence	Best Media Solution – Integrated Media (Silver award)	Del Monte Kitchenomics	Won
2014	Philippine Association of National Advertisers Truth in Advertising Awards (PANAta Award for Marketing Excellence)	External Communications Programs (Brand)	Del Monte Kitchenomics	Won
