= GMA New Media =

Digital media division of GMA Network

GMA New Media, Inc.
- Type: Subsidiary
- Industry: Digital media Technology
- Founded: 2000; 26 years ago
- Headquarters: GMA Network Center, EDSA cor. Timog Avenue, Diliman, Quezon City, Metro Manila, Philippines
- Area served: Worldwide
- Key people: Atty. Felipe L. Gozon (Chairman); Dennis Augusto L. Caharian (President and COO); Felipe S. Yalong (Treasurer)
- Products: Web Services, Mobile Applications, Online Games, Digital terrestrial television
- Parent: GMA Network, Inc.
- Subsidiaries: Digify, Inc.; Media Merge
- Website: www.gmanmi.com

GMA New Media, Inc. (GMA NMI) is the digital media and technology arm of GMA Network, Inc. which offers interactive applications in the television, mobile, web, marketing and online gaming industry, and produces video and livestream content for social media. Its headquarters are located at the 2nd and 12th floor of the GMA Network Center in Diliman, Quezon City, Philippines.

== Products and services ==
=== Websites ===
- GMA News Online

In 2007, GMA NMI launched GMA News Online (then called gmanews). In the same year, the site won several awards including Best Website in the 9th Philippine Web Awards in 2007 for the Media category.

- GMA Network Portal

In late 2011, NMI launched GMANetwork, a one-stop portal that consolidates GMA’s web properties including GMA News Online, GMA Entertainment Website, and IMReady Public Service Portal. It won the Digital Filipino Web Awards for the Television category in 2014.

- Kapuso Stream

On June 20, 2022, GMA Network launched Kapuso Stream, a web-based channel competed with ABS-CBN's Kapamilya Online Live and TV5's Kapatid Livestream. It airs original programming from GMA and GTV, as well as a simulcast of ABS-CBN Studios' It's Showtime along with AMBS' All TV and Pinoy Big Brother: Celebrity Collab Edition and its second season. Kapuso Stream became accessible worldwide and streams on a specific timeslot per day.

=== Mobile applications ===
- GMA Play
- GMA News
- IMReady
- Kapuso Milyonaryo (Application developed with Digify, Inc. for GMA Marketing and Productions, Inc.)
- You Scoop is a joint initiative between NMI and GMA News and Public Affairs (GMA News). The app allows citizen participation in journalism by sending information, photographs, videos or audio recordings of news as they happen. A team of editors screen which crowdsourced news items will be shared on the YouScoop page on GMA News Online or broadcast on GMA News and Public Affairs programs.

=== Broadcast applications ===
- GMA Affordabox is a digital receiver that delivers Digital Terrestrial Transmission as well as Over-the-Top (OTT) internet-based content and applications. The device was released on June 26, 2020.
- GMA Now is a DTV dongle used for Android Devices and iPhone users soon. It was released on February 7, 2021, during All-Out Sundays.

=== Former ===
- Philippine Entertainment Portal (PEP is a joint venture of NMI (GMA Network Inc.) and Summit Digital which offers entertainment news from the local and international film and television industry.) The joint venture ended on November 11, 2026.
- Sports Interactive Network (Spin is a joint venture of NMI (GMA Network Inc.) and Philippine Entertainment Portal, Inc. which offers local and international sports news. The joint venture ended on November 11, 2026.

== Subsidiaries and joint ventures ==
- Digify, Inc.

Digify is a subsidiary of GMA New Media that specializes in solutions for stand-alone digital and integrated marketing campaigns for mobile, web and smart TV applications.

- Media Merge Corp.

Media Merge is a subsidiary of GMA New Media that is in charge business development and operations for the Company's online publishing/advertising initiatives.:

- Philippine Entertainment Portal, Inc.

Philippine Entertainment Portal is a joint venture of Summit Media and GMA New Media which operates Philippine Entertainment Portal (PEP.ph) and Sports Interactive Network Philippines (SPIN.ph).

- Gamespan, Inc. (defunct)

Gamespan is a joint venture of GMA New Media and Manila Jockey Club, Inc. Gamspan operates and manages the computer systems owned by Manila Jockey Club and the infrastructure for taking bets in horse racing and other sports.

- X-Play Online Games, Inc. (defunct)

X-Play was a joint venture of GMA New Media, Inc. and IP E-Game Ventures Inc., at present X-Play now operates under IP Ventures Inc.
