= Jiggy Manicad =

Filipino journalist (born 1974)

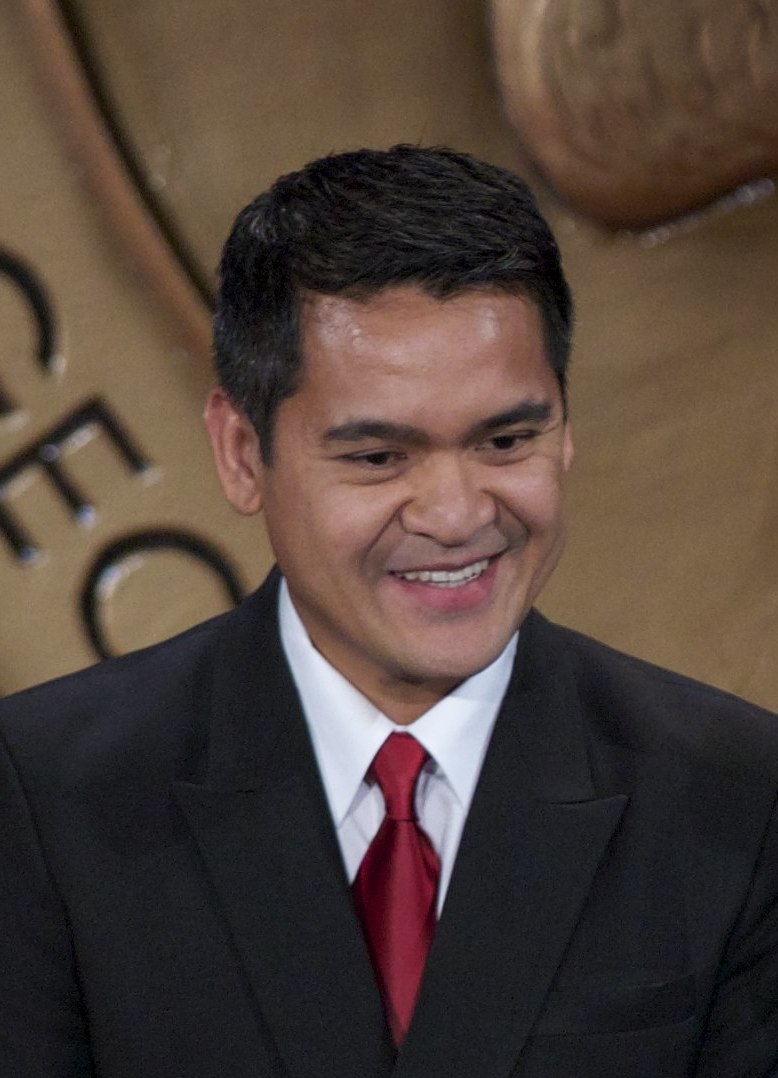
- Manicad at the 73rd Annual Peabody Awards
- Born: Rodrigo Defeo Manicad Jr. November 15, 1974 (age 51); Jose Panganiban, Camarines Norte, Philippines
- Education: University of the Philippines Los Baños (B.A.)
- Occupations: Television newscaster; journalist; reporter; politician
- Years active: 1995–present
- Employers: ABS-CBN Corporation; GMA News and Public Affairs (1995–2018); News5 (2023–present)
- Political party: PDP–Laban
- Other political affiliations: Independent (under Hugpong ng Pagbabago)
- Spouse: Marnie Pulumbarit (m. 2008)
- Children: 3
- Website: https://www.jiggymanicad.com/

Rodrigo Defeo "Jiggy" Manicad Jr. (/məˈniːˌkæd/ (Tagalog: [ˈdʒigi mɐˈnɪkad]) mə-NEE-kad; born November 15, 1974) is a Filipino television news producer, reporter and broadcast journalist.

During his stint in GMA Network, he was a presenter in Reporter's Notebook, and anchored news programs 24 Oras Weekend and News TV Quick Response Team. Manicad is currently serving as an anchor of TV5's 5:30 pm newscast Una Sa Lahat.

== Early life and career ==
Rodrigo Defeo Manicad Jr. is the son of Rodrigo Manicad Sr. and Lusviminda Defeo Manicad. He finished elementary and secondary in San Pablo Colleges. He was born on November 15, 1974. He took Communication Arts at the University of the Philippines Los Baños. As a kid, he loved animals especially dogs. His dog Tikboy was chosen as one of the K-9 dogs of the National Bureau of Investigation (NBI). He worked as assistant editor of the International Rice Research Institute (IRRI). Years later, he found himself back in Manila, becoming one of the writers of the popular show Magandang Gabi... Bayan on ABS-CBN.

He later transferred to GMA Network as he wanted to become a newscaster and reporter, and soon became a presenter for the documentary show Reporter's Notebook, alongside Maki Pulido. While reporting on the May 1, 2001, riot along Mendiola, San Miguel, Manila, he was injured by a rock that hit his head in the middle of the riot between the protesters and police authorities.

His stories include insurgency and extremism in Mindanao, disasters, and the illegal arms trade. In 2004, he was awarded the British Chevening Scholarship Award. He then took a postgraduate course in International Broadcast Journalism at Cardiff University in Wales. He was chosen from 800 applicant journalists from all over the country. As part of the program, he had his practicum at the BBC in Norwich, England. He is also an awardee of Ten Outstanding Young Men for 2012 for journalism.

On February 21, 2010, Manicad anchored the 24 Oras Weekend, alongside Pia Arcangel.

On August 1, 2011, he served as the anchor of GMA News TV's first ever on-location newscast News TV Quick Response Team.

On April 20, 2018, Manicad announced his departure from GMA Network and his resignation from media service during the closing of Quick Response Team, after the prospective senatorial candidate under the ruling PDP–Laban political party for 2019 senatorial election. Following his exit, Manicad was eventually replaced by Emil Sumangil on News TV Quick Response Team, Jun Veneracion on Reporter's Notebook, and Ivan Mayrina on 24 Oras Weekend.

After losing in the elections, he returned to GMA Network by airing his show AgriPreneur, which is produced by his wife's company, Marnie Manicad Productions International (MMPI) until 2023.

On December 7, 2023, Manicad marked his return to journalism when he signed a contract with TV5 to become an anchor of Frontline Pilipinas, joining fellow former ABS-CBN News personalities Cheryl Cosim and Julius Babao on January 8, 2024. He then became the host of investigative show Budol Alert on September 22, 2024, replacing Luchi Cruz-Valdes following her retirement. On May 16, 2025, Manicad left Frontline Pilipinas to anchor its new lead-in newscast program, Una sa Lahat, beginning on May 19.

== Filmography ==
Television
Year	Title	Note
2025–present	Una Sa Lahat	Anchor
2025	I Love Filipino	Host
2024	Budol Alert	Host
2024–2025	Frontline Pilipinas	Anchor
2019–2023	AgriPreneur	Host
2018	The Working Class	Host
2011–2018	News TV QRT	Anchor
2010–2018	24 Oras Weekend	Anchor
2004–2018	Reporter's Notebook	Host
1996–2001	Brigada Siete	Reporter

== Awards and nominations ==
Year	Award giving body	Category	Nominated work	Network	Results	Source
2017	Gandingan Awards	Best News Anchor	24 Oras Weekend	GMA Network	Won	
2017	Gandingan Awards	Best Investigative Program Host	Reporter's Notebook	GMA Network	Won	
