= State of the Nation (Philippine TV program) =

Philippine television news show

- Title card since 2026
- Also known as: State of the Nation with Jessica Soho (Note: 2011–21)
- Genre: News broadcasting
- Directed by: Joel San Luis
- Presented by: Jessica Soho; Maki Pulido; Atom Araullo
- Narrated by: Al Torres
- Country of origin: Philippines
- Original language: Tagalog

Production
- Producers: Sheila Paras; Nessa Valdellon
- Production locations: GMA Network Center, Quezon City, Philippines
- Camera setup: Multiple-camera setup
- Running time: 30–75 minutes
- Production company: GMA News

Original release
- Network: GMA News TV (2011–21); GTV (since 2021)
- Release: February 28, 2011 – present

State of the Nation (formerly State of the Nation with Jessica Soho) is a Philippine television news broadcasting show broadcast by GMA News TV and GTV. Originally anchored by Jessica Soho, it premiered on February 28, 2011. Atom Araullo currently serves as the anchor.

== Overview ==
The show features several guests to analyze the issues of the Philippines, as well as reports and rundown of the day's news.

In March 2020, the show was temporarily suspended due to the enhanced community quarantine in Luzon caused by the COVID-19 pandemic. The show resumed its programming on September 21, 2020.

On January 4, 2021, Maki Pulido and Atom Araullo replaced Jessica Soho as anchors. In February 2021, GMA News TV was rebranded as GTV, with the show being carried over.

On October 28, 2024, due to GMA Integrated News' cost reduction, Araullo became the sole anchor of the news show and Pulido was let go from the show.

== Anchors ==
Anchors

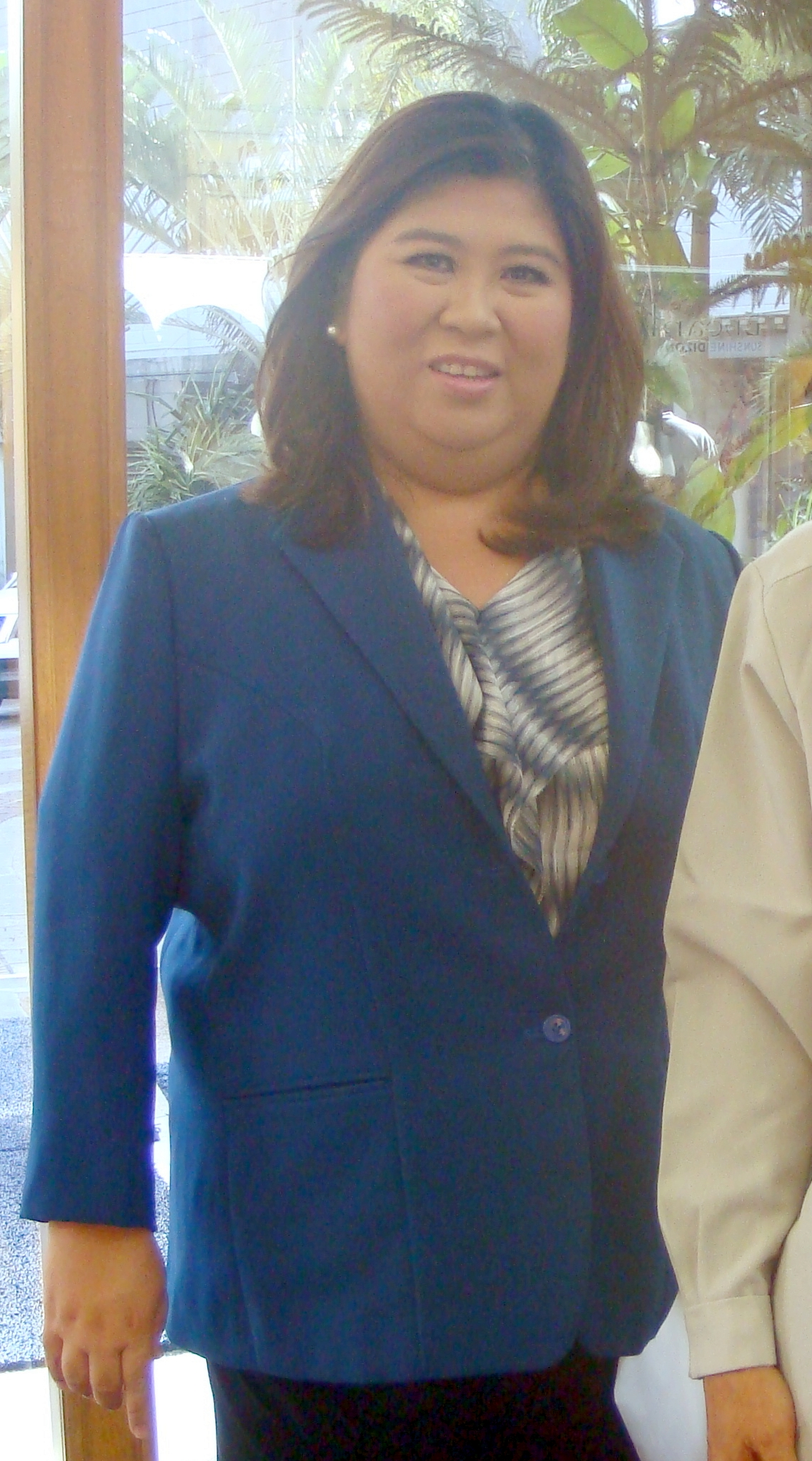
Jessica Soho

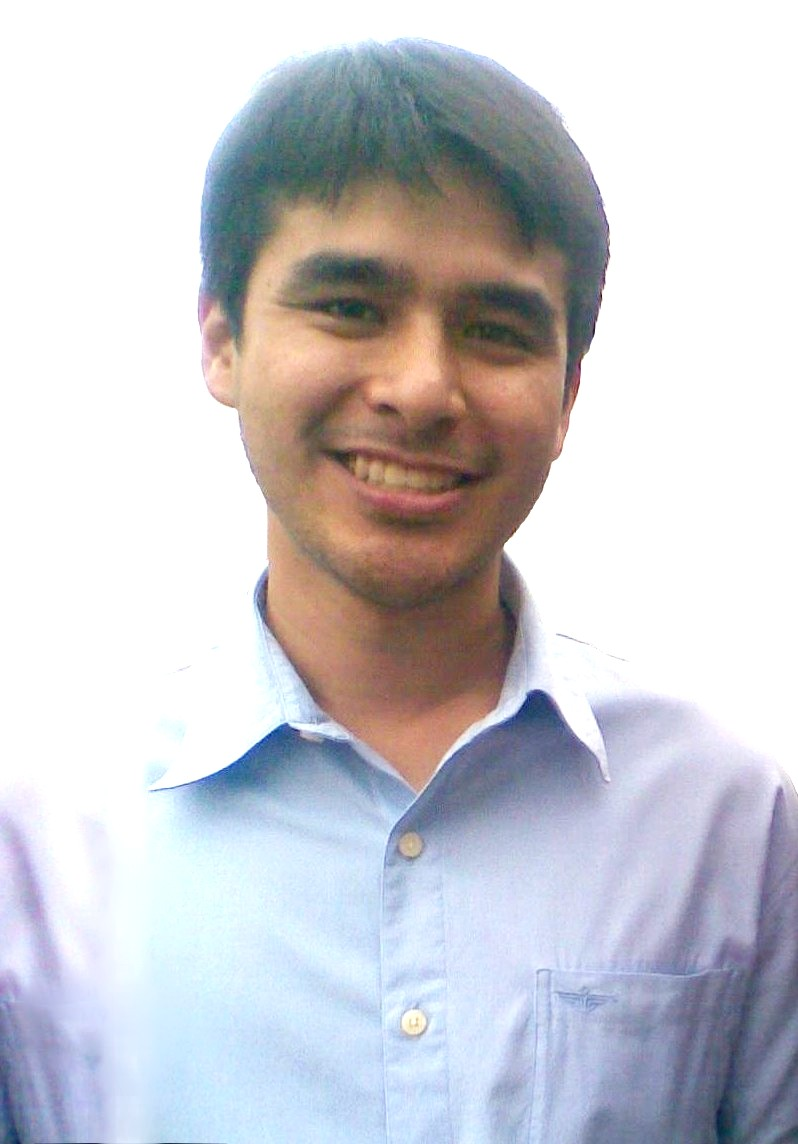
Atom Araullo

- Atom Araullo (since 2021)

Former anchors

- Jessica Soho (2011–21)
- Maki Pulido (2021–24)

== Accolades ==
Accolades received by State of the Nation
Year	Award	Category	Recipient	Result	Ref.
2011	33rd Catholic Mass Media Awards	Best News Magazine Show	State of the Nation with Jessica Soho	Won	
2011	Golden Screen TV Awards	Outstanding News Program	State of the Nation with Jessica Soho	Nominated	
2011	Golden Screen TV Awards	Outstanding Female News Presenter	Jessica Soho	Nominated	
2011	25th PMPC Star Awards for Television	Best Female Newscaster	Jessica Soho	Nominated	
2011	25th PMPC Star Awards for Television	Best News Program	State of the Nation with Jessica Soho	Nominated	
2012	26th PMPC Star Awards for Television	Best Female Newscaster	Jessica Soho	Nominated	
2012	26th PMPC Star Awards for Television	Best News Program	State of the Nation with Jessica Soho	Nominated	
2013	35th Catholic Mass Media Awards	Best News Program	State of the Nation with Jessica Soho	Won	
2013	Golden Screen TV Awards	Outstanding News Program	State of the Nation with Jessica Soho	Won	
2013	Golden Screen TV Awards	Outstanding Female News Presenter	Jessica Soho	Nominated	
2013	27th PMPC Star Awards for Television	Best Female Newscaster	Jessica Soho	Nominated	
2013	27th PMPC Star Awards for Television	Best News Program	State of the Nation with Jessica Soho	Won	
2013	7th UPLB Isko’t Iska's Broadcast Choice Awards	Best News Program	State of the Nation with Jessica Soho	Won	
2013	7th UPLB Isko’t Iska's Broadcast Choice Awards	Best News Anchor	Jessica Soho	Won	
2014	Golden Screen TV Awards	Outstanding News Program	"Hagupit Ng Bagyong Pablo"	Won	
2014	Golden Screen TV Awards	Outstanding Female News Presenter	Jessica Soho	Nominated	
2014	1st Paragala Central Luzon Media Awards	Best Female News Presenter	Jessica Soho	Won	
2014	28th PMPC Star Awards for Television	Best Female Newscaster	Jessica Soho	Won	
2014	28th PMPC Star Awards for Television	Best News Program	State of the Nation with Jessica Soho	Won	
2015	29th PMPC Star Awards for Television	Best Female Newscaster	Jessica Soho	Won	
2015	29th PMPC Star Awards for Television	Best News Program	State of the Nation with Jessica Soho	Won	
2016	30th PMPC Star Awards for Television	Best Female Newscaster	Jessica Soho	Nominated	
2016	30th PMPC Star Awards for Television	Best News Program	State of the Nation with Jessica Soho	Nominated	
2017	31st PMPC Star Awards for Television	Best Female Newscaster	Jessica Soho	Nominated	
2017	31st PMPC Star Awards for Television	Best News Program	State of the Nation with Jessica Soho	Nominated	
2018	32nd PMPC Star Awards for Television	Best Female Newscaster	Jessica Soho	Nominated	
2018	32nd PMPC Star Awards for Television	Best News Program	State of the Nation with Jessica Soho	Nominated	
2019	33rd PMPC Star Awards for Television	Best Female Newscaster	Jessica Soho	Nominated	
2019	33rd PMPC Star Awards for Television	Best News Program	State of the Nation with Jessica Soho	Nominated	
2020	Gandingan 2020: The 14th UPLB Isko’t Iska Multi-media Awards	Most Development Oriented Educational Program	State of the Nation with Jessica Soho	Won	
2020	42nd Catholic Mass Media Awards	Best News Program	"Tracing the Origins of COVID-19 in the Philippines"	Won	
2021	34th PMPC Star Awards for Television	Best Female Newscaster	Jessica Soho	Nominated	
2021	34th PMPC Star Awards for Television	Best News Program	State of the Nation	Nominated	
2023	35th PMPC Star Awards for Television	Best Female Newscaster	Jessica Soho	Nominated	
2023	35th PMPC Star Awards for Television	Best Male Newscaster	Atom Araullo	Nominated	
2023	35th PMPC Star Awards for Television	Best News Program	State of the Nation	Nominated	
2024	6th Gawad Lasallianeta	Most Outstanding News Male Anchor	Atom Araullo	Won	
2025	37th PMPC Star Awards for Television	Best Male Newscaster	Atom Araullo	Nominated	
2025	37th PMPC Star Awards for Television	Best News Program	State of the Nation	Nominated	
2025	38th PMPC Star Awards for Television	Best Male Newscaster	Atom Araullo	Nominated	
2025	38th PMPC Star Awards for Television	Best News Program	State of the Nation	Nominated	
