= Reporter's Notebook =

Philippine television documentary show

- Title card since 2026
- Genre: Documentary
- Directed by: May Delos Santos
- Presented by: Jiggy Manicad; Maki Pulido; Rhea Santos; Jun Veneracion
- Theme music composer: Edilberto Aguila
- Country of origin: Philippines
- Original language: Tagalog

Production
- Executive producer: Ian Simbulan
- Editors: Ferdie Abril; Kernan Gatbonton
- Camera setup: Multiple-camera setup
- Running time: 30 minutes
- Production company: GMA Public Affairs

Original release
- Network: GMA Network (June 1, 2004 – April 25, 2020, January 7, 2021 – October 21, 2021, since February 4, 2023); GMA News TV (August 6, 2020 – December 31, 2020); GTV (October 28, 2021 – January 13, 2022)
- Release: June 1, 2004 – present

Reporter's Notebook is a Philippine television documentary show broadcast by GMA Network, GMA News TV and GTV. Originally hosted by Jiggy Manicad and Maki Pulido, it premiered on June 1, 2004 on the network's Tuesday evening line up. The show concluded on GMA Network on April 25, 2020. The show moved to GMA News TV on August 6, 2020, on the network's Power Block line up. Pulido and Jun Veneracion served as the current hosts. The show returned to GMA Network on January 7, 2021 and again on February 4, 2023.

== Hosts ==
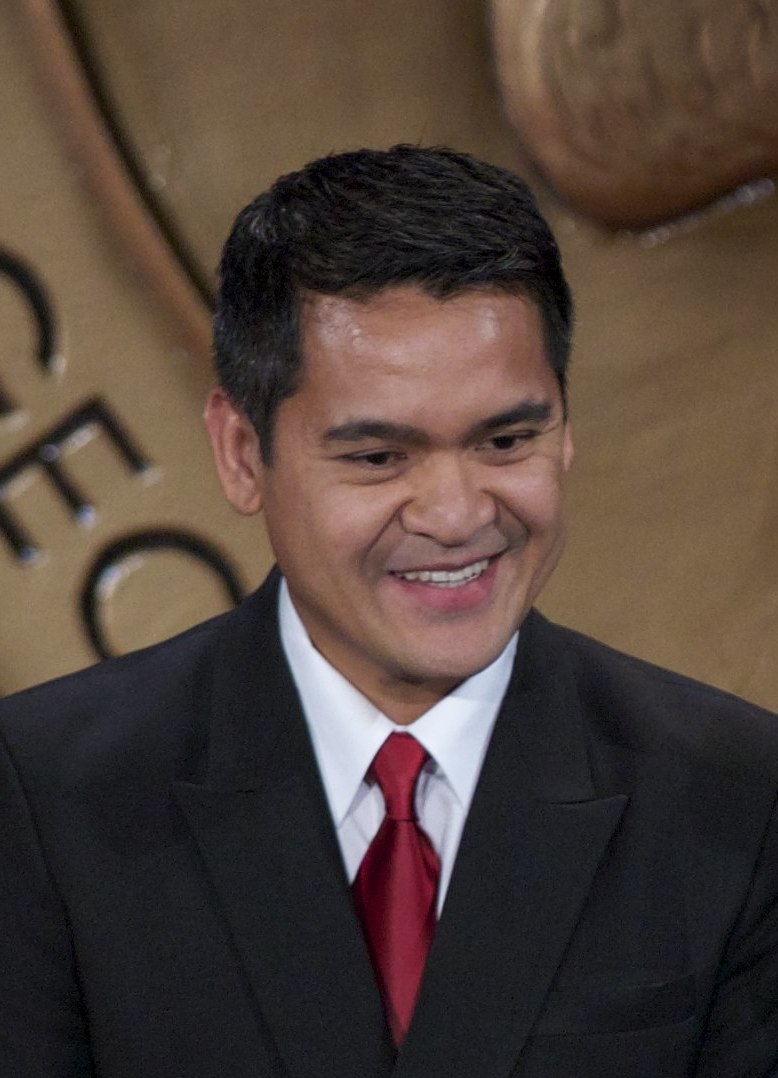
Jiggy Manicad served as a host.

- Jiggy Manicad (2004–18)
- Maki Pulido
- Rhea Santos (2009–11)
- Jun Veneracion (since 2018)

== Production ==
In March 2020, production was halted due to the enhanced community quarantine in Luzon caused by the COVID-19 pandemic. The show resumed its programming on August 6, 2020.

== Accolades ==
Accolades received by Reporter's Notebook
Year	Award	Category	Recipient	Result	Ref.
2005	New York Festivals for Television	Best Human Interest Story	"Bakal Boys"	Finalist	
2005	US International Film and Video Festival	Best Documentary	"Backdoor"	Silver Screen Award	
2006	New York Festivals for Television	Best Human Interest Story	"Batang Kargador"	Finalist	
2006	20th PMPC Star Awards for Television	Best Magazine Show	Reporter's Notebook	Nominated	
2006	20th PMPC Star Awards for Television	Best Magazine Show Host	Jiggy Manicad Maki Pulido	Nominated	
2007	Asian Television Awards	Best Current Affairs Programme	"Batang Hitman"	Highly commended	
2007	CASBAA/ABU UNICEF Child Rights Award	Best Documentary	"Diskriminasyon"	Finalist	
2007	21st PMPC Star Awards for Television	Best Documentary Program	Reporter's Notebook	Nominated	
2007	21st PMPC Star Awards for Television	Best Documentary Program Host	Cesar Apolinario Jiggy Manicad Maki Pulido	Nominated	
2007	US International Film and Video Festival	Certificate for Creative Excellence for the Documentary/Social Issues	"Gatilyo"	Won	
2007	US International Film and Video Festival	Certificate for Creative Excellence for the Documentary/Social Issues	"Slaughterhouse"	Won	
2008	Asian Television Awards	Best Current Affairs Program	"Giyera sa Lebanon"	Won	
2008	Asian Television Awards	Best Current Affairs Program Host	Maki Pulido Jiggy Manicad	Finalist	
2008	New York Festivals for Television	Best Human Interest Story	"Batang Kalakal"	Gold World Medal	
2008	New York Festivals for Television	Coverage of an On-going Story	"Engkuwentro"	Bronze World Medal	
2008	22nd PMPC Star Awards for Television	Best Documentary Program	Reporter's Notebook	Nominated	
2008	22nd PMPC Star Awards for Television	Best Documentary Program Host	Jiggy Manicad Maki Pulido	Nominated	
2008	US International Film and Video Festival	Documentary/Social Issues	"Batang Kalakal"	Silver Screen Award	
2008	US International Film and Video Festival	Documentary/Social Issues	"Pulong Diablo"	Certificate for Creative Excellence	
2009	7th Gawad Tanglaw	Best Documentary Program	Reporter's Notebook	Won	
2009	New York Festivals for Television	Best Public Affairs Program	"Pinays for Export: The Asian Sex Trafficking Trail"	Bronze World Medal	
2009	23rd PMPC Star Awards for Television	Best Documentary Program	Reporter's Notebook	Nominated	
2009	23rd PMPC Star Awards for Television	Best Documentary Program Host	Jiggy Manicad Maki Pulido	Nominated	
2009	US International Film and Video Festival	Documentary/Social Issues	"Lunok Droga"	Silver Screen Award	
2009	US International Film and Video Festival	Certificate for Creative Excellence for the Documentary/Social Issues	"Pinays for Export: The Asian Sex Trafficking Trail"	Won	
2010	24th PMPC Star Awards for Television	Best Documentary Program	Reporter's Notebook	Nominated	
2010	24th PMPC Star Awards for Television	Best Documentary Program Host	Jiggy Manicad Maki Pulido	Nominated	
2011	8th Golden Screen TV Awards	Outstanding Natural History/Wildlife Program	"Nilasong Lawa"	Nominated	
2011	8th Golden Screen TV Awards	Outstanding Natural History/Wildlife Program Host	Jiggy Manicad Maki Pulido	Nominated	
2011	8th Golden Screen TV Awards	Outstanding News Magazine Program	"AFP Modernization"	Nominated	
2011	8th Golden Screen TV Awards	Outstanding News Magazine Program Host	Jiggy Manicad Maki Pulido	Nominated	
2011	25th PMPC Star Awards for Television	Best Documentary Program	Reporter's Notebook	Nominated	
2011	25th PMPC Star Awards for Television	Best Documentary Program Host	Jiggy Manicad Maki Pulido	Nominated	
2012	26th PMPC Star Awards for Television	Best Documentary Program	Reporter's Notebook	Nominated	
2012	26th PMPC Star Awards for Television	Best Documentary Program Host	Jiggy Manicad Maki Pulido	Nominated	
2013	10th Golden Screen TV Awards	Outstanding Natural History/Wildlife Program	Pilipinas for Sale	Nominated	
2013	10th Golden Screen TV Awards	Outstanding Natural History/Wildlife Program Host	Maki Pulido Jiggy Manicad	Nominated	
2013	27th PMPC Star Awards for Television	Best Documentary Program	Reporter's Notebook	Nominated	
2013	27th PMPC Star Awards for Television	Best Documentary Program Host	Jiggy Manicad Maki Pulido	Nominated	
2013	UPLB Gandingan Awards	Best Investigative Program	Reporter's Notebook	Nominated	
2014	Golden Screen TV Awards	Outstanding News Magazine Program	Reporter's Notebook	Nominated	
2014	Golden Screen TV Awards	Outstanding News Magazine Program Host	Jiggy Manicad Maki Pulido	Nominated	
2014	28th PMPC Star Awards for Television	Best Documentary Program	Reporter's Notebook	Nominated	
2014	28th PMPC Star Awards for Television	Best Documentary Program Host	Jiggy Manicad Maki Pulido	Nominated	
2015	29th PMPC Star Awards for Television	Best Documentary Program	Reporter's Notebook	Nominated	
2015	29th PMPC Star Awards for Television	Best Documentary Program Host	Jiggy Manicad Maki Pulido	Nominated	
2016	30th PMPC Star Awards for Television	Best Documentary Program	Reporter's Notebook	Nominated	
2016	30th PMPC Star Awards for Television	Best Documentary Program Host	Maki Pulido Raffy Tima	Nominated	
2016	US International Film and Video Festival	Silver Screen Award	Hikbi sa Ibayong Dagat (Far From Home)	Won	
2017	31st PMPC Star Awards for Television	Best Documentary Program	Reporter's Notebook	Nominated	
2017	31st PMPC Star Awards for Television	Best Documentary Program Host	Jiggy Manicad Maki Pulido	Nominated	
2018	32nd PMPC Star Awards for Television	Best Documentary Program	Reporter's Notebook	Nominated	
2018	32nd PMPC Star Awards for Television	Best Documentary Program Host	Maki Pulido Raffy Tima	Nominated	
2019	Anak TV Seal Awards		Reporter's Notebook	Won	
2020	Gandingan 2020: The 14th UPLB Isko’t Iska Multi-media Awards	Most Development Oriented Investigative Program	Reporter's Notebook	Won	
2020	42nd Catholic Mass Media Awards	Best Public Service Program	"Mga Sugat ni Miguel" (transl. Miguel's Wounds)	Won	
2021	34th PMPC Star Awards for Television	Best Documentary Program	Reporter's Notebook	Nominated	
2021	34th PMPC Star Awards for Television	Best Documentary Program Host	Maki Pulido Ian Veneracion	Nominated	
2021	Asian Academy Creative Awards	Best Current Affairs Programme or Series	"Lilibeth, Sonia, Frank, and Fabel"	Won	
2023	35th PMPC Star Awards for Television	Best Documentary Program	Reporter's Notebook	Nominated	
2023	35th PMPC Star Awards for Television	Best Documentary Program Host	Maki Pulido Ian Veneracion	Nominated	
2024	Asian Academy Creative Awards	Best Documentary Program	"Upuan ni Ipiw"	Won	
2025	37th PMPC Star Awards for Television	Best Documentary Program	Reporter's Notebook	Nominated	
2025	37th PMPC Star Awards for Television	Best Documentary Program Host	Maki Pulido Jun Veneracion	Nominated	
2025	38th PMPC Star Awards for Television	Best Documentary Program	Reporter's Notebook	Pending	
2025	38th PMPC Star Awards for Television	Best Documentary Program Host	Maki Pulido Jun Veneracion	Pending	
