= 24 Oras =

Philippine television news show

- Title card since 2026
- Genre: News broadcasting
- Directed by: Joel San Luis
- Presented by: Mel Tiangco; Mike Enriquez; Vicky Morales; Emil Sumangil
- Voices of: Mel Tiangco; Mike Enriquez; Emil Sumangil
- Narrated by: Joel Reyes Zobel; Mike Enriquez; Mel Tiangco; Emil Sumangil
- Theme music composer: Jimmy Antiporda
- Country of origin: Philippines
- Original language: Tagalog

Production
- Executive producer: Antonio Magsumbol
- Production locations: Studio 2, GMA Network Center, Quezon City, Philippines; Studio 5, GMA Network Center, Quezon City, Philippines
- Camera setup: Multiple-camera setup
- Running time: 60–90 minutes
- Production company: GMA News

Original release
- Network: GMA Network
- Release: March 15, 2004 – present

24 Oras (pronounced as bente kwatro oras / transl. 24 hours) is a Philippine television news broadcasting show broadcast by GMA Network. Originally anchored by Mel Tiangco and Mike Enriquez, it premiered on March 15, 2004, on the network's Telebabad line up. Tiangco, Vicky Morales and Emil Sumangil currently serve as the anchors.

== Overview ==
GMA Network's chairman Felipe Gozon came up with an idea of creating a news broadcasting show for the network by merging news shows Frontpage: Ulat ni Mel Tiangco and Saksi. 24 Oras premiered on March 15, 2004, broadcasting from Studio 2 of GMA Network Center, replacing Frontpage: Ulat ni Mel Tiangco. Newscasters Mel Tiangco and Mike Enriquez served as anchors, with actress-host Pia Guanio as the anchor for the segment Showbiz Time (later Chika Minute).

On November 10, 2014, newscaster Vicky Morales joined the show. On May 29, 2015, Guanio left the program and was replaced by actress-host Iya Villania on June 15. On August 24, 2018, newscaster Atom Araullo served as a substitute anchor for Enriquez, who went on a medical leave. Enriquez returned to the program on November 26, 2018.

In March 2020, due to the enhanced community quarantine in Luzon caused by the COVID-19 pandemic; Enriquez temporarily took a break from the show, Tiangco anchored the segment Kapusong Totoo (transl. real Kapuso) through voice recording, Araullo and newscaster Jessica Soho served as temporary anchors, along with Morales and Villania and meteorologist Nathaniel Cruz all started anchoring their segments through their respective home. In April 2020, the show added sign language interpreters. On June 1, 2020, Enriquez, Tiangco and Cruz returned to anchor from the studio set of the program. On October 11, 2021, host Kim Atienza joined the show to anchor the segment #KuyaKimAnoNa.

In December 2021, Enriquez took another medical leave from the show. The following year, Villania returned to anchor from the show's studio set. On March 28, 2022, Enriquez returned to the show. In August 2022, he took yet another leave of absence from the show, until his death on August 29, 2023.

On August 7, 2023, host Martin Javier started to anchor the segment Game Changer. The segment was later renamed as In the Game in 2026. On November 20, 2023, news reporter Emil Sumangil became a regular anchor of the show.

== Anchors ==
Anchors

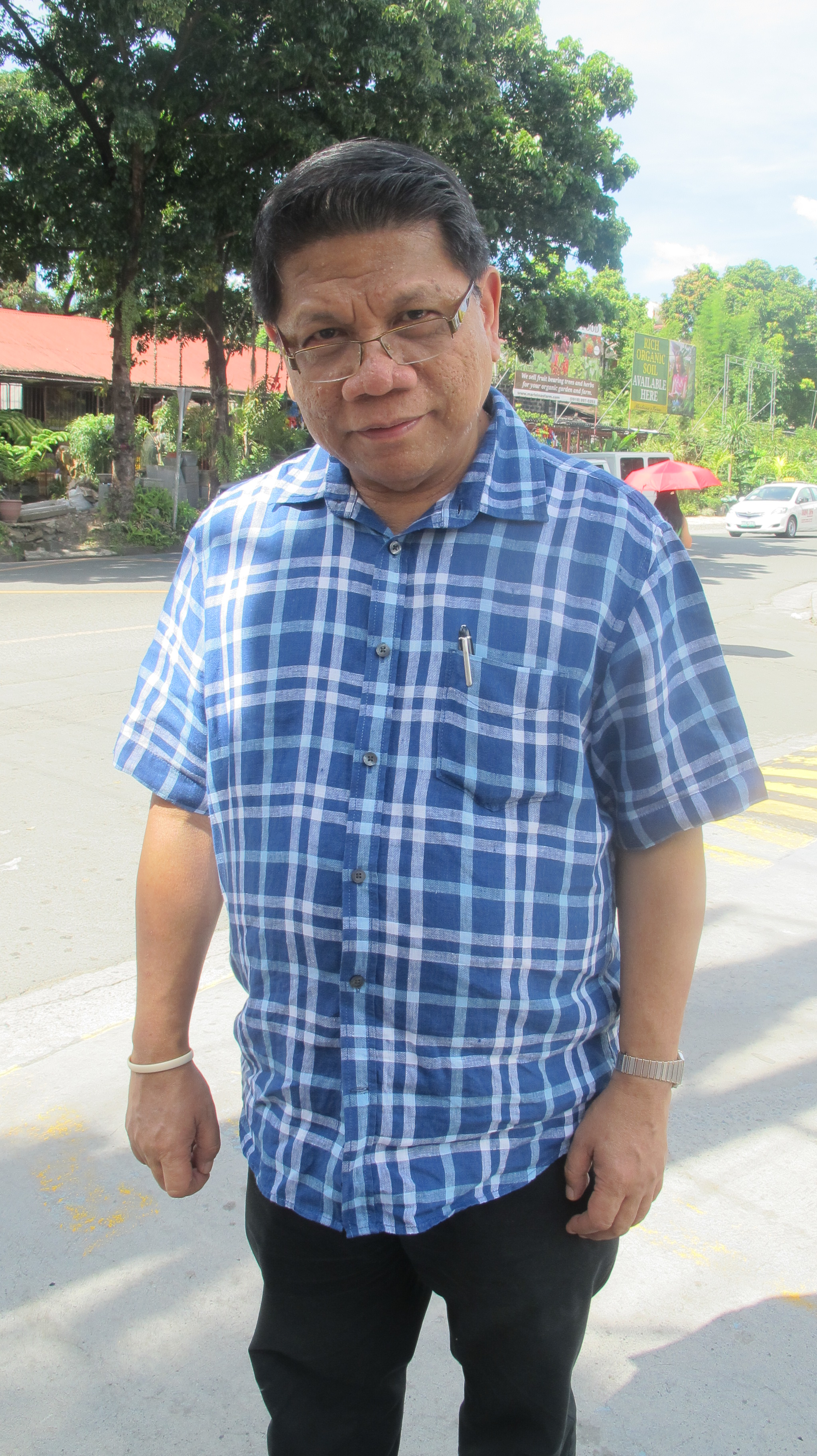
Mike Enriquez

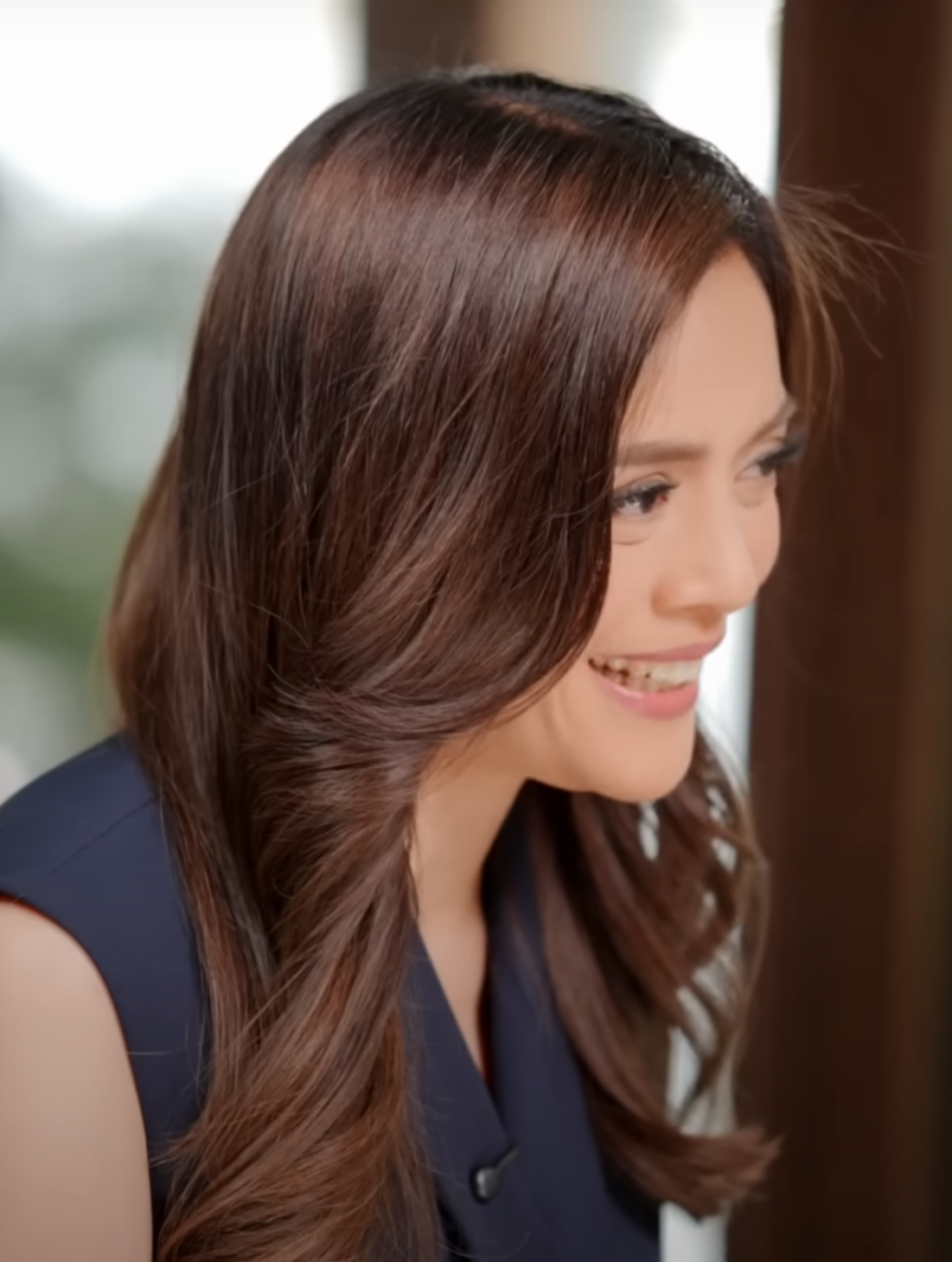
Vicky Morales

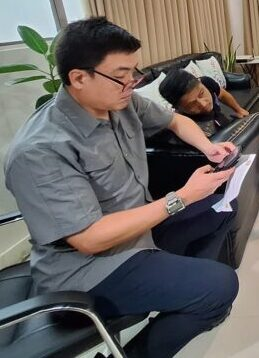
Emil Sumangil

- Mel Tiangco
- Vicky Morales (since 2014)
- Emil Sumangil (since 2023)

Segment anchors

- Iya Villania (since 2015, Chika Minute)
- Kim Atienza (since 2021, Kuya Kim, Ano Na?)
- Martin Javier (since 2023, In the Game)
- Amor Larrosa (since 2024, GMA News Weather Center)

Former anchors

- Mike Enriquez (2004–22)
- Pia Guanio (2004–15, Chika Minute)
- Atom Araullo (2004–05, Atomic Sports)
- Chino Trinidad (2006–23, Time Out)
- Nathaniel "Mang Tani" Cruz (2012–22, I.M. Ready: GMA Weather)
- Maureen Schrijvers (2023, GMA Integrated News Weather Center)

Interim anchors

- Connie Sison (2014–24)
- Jessica Soho (2012–14, 2016–17, 2020)
- Atom Araullo (2018–24)
- Arnold Clavio (2018–23)
- Kara David (2019)
- Ivan Mayrina (2019–24)
- Mariz Umali (2019–24)
- Pia Arcangel (2019–24)
- Jun Veneracion (2019–21)
- Raffy Tima (2021–22)
- Chino Gaston (2022–23)

== Segments ==
- #BosesMo
- Chika in a Minute
- Chika Minute
- GMA Integrated News Special Report
- GMA News Weather Center (formerly GMA Integrated News Weather Center)
- Kapuso Action Man
- Kapusong Totoo
- In the Game
- Kuya Kim, Ano Na?
- Pampa-Good Vibes
- Patok of the Town
- Usapang Pets

Defunct

- Alerto 24
- Atomic Sports
- Balitang Abroad
- Bantay Probinsya
- Game Changer
- Good News
- Huli Cam
- I.M. Ready: GMA Weather
- Imbestigador ng Bayan
- Love Today
- Newsflash
- Pagbangon
- Patok of the Town
- Ronda Probinsya
- Showbiz Time
- Sumbungan ng Bayan
- Summer Sparkle
- #SummerVibes
- ThinkTok
- Time Out
- Viral na 'To!
- YouScoop

== 24 Oras Weekend ==
24 Oras
- Title card since 2026
- Also known as: 24 Oras Weekend
- Genre: News broadcasting
- Directed by: Lirio Dayao
- Presented by: Pia Arcangel; Jiggy Manicad; Ivan Mayrina
- Theme music composer: Jimmy Antiporda
- Country of origin: Philippines
- Original language: Tagalog

Production
- Executive producer: Nielsen Ocampo
- Production locations: Studio 2, GMA Network Center, Quezon City, Philippines; Studio 5, GMA Network Center, Quezon City, Philippines
- Camera setup: Multiple-camera setup
- Running time: 30–45 minutes
- Production company: GMA News

Original release
- Network: GMA Network
- Release: February 21, 2010 – present

Originally anchored by Pia Arcangel and Jiggy Manicad, the weekend edition of 24 Oras premiered on February 21, 2010, on the network's Saturday and Sunday evening line up replacing GMA Weekend Report. On April 21, 2018, Manicad left the show for his Philippine senatorial candidacy. In August 2018, Ivan Mayrina became an anchor. Arcangel and Mayrina currently serve as the anchors.

=== Anchors ===
- Pia Arcangel
- Ivan Mayrina (since 2018)

Segment anchors

- Nelson Canlas (since 2013, Chika Minute)
- Kim Atienza (since 2023, Kuya Kim, Ano Na?)

Former anchors

- Jiggy Manicad (2010–18)
- Grace Lee (2010–12, Chika Minute)
- Luane Dy (2010–13, Chika Minute)
- Cata Tibayan (2013–18, Chika Minute)

Interim anchors

- Mariz Umali (2014–24)

=== Ratings ===
According to AGB Nielsen Philippines' Mega Manila household television ratings, the premiere of 24 Oras Weekend earned an 18.4% rating.

=== Accolades ===
Accolades received by 24 Oras Weekend
Year	Award	Category	Recipient	Result	Ref.
2018	32nd PMPC Star Awards for Television	Best Female Newscaster	Pia Arcangel	Nominated	
2019	33rd PMPC Star Awards for Television	Best Male Newscaster	Ivan Mayrina	Nominated	
2023	35th PMPC Star Awards for Television	Best Female Newscaster	Pia Arcangel	Nominated	
2023	35th PMPC Star Awards for Television	Best Male Newscaster	Ivan Mayrina	Nominated	
2025	38th PMPC Star Awards for Television	Best Male Newscaster	Ivan Mayrina	Nominated	
