= Maki Pulido =

Filipino television journalist (born 1972)

- Born: Maria Judea Jimenez Pulido; May 20, 1972 (age 54); Dagupan City, Pangasinan, Philippines
- Other name: Maki
- Occupations: Reporter, journalist
- Years active: 1995–present
- Political party: PMP (2009–2010)
- Spouse: Joey Ilagan
- Children: 2

Maria Judea "Maki" Jimenez Pulido-Ilagan (Tagalog: [hiˈmɛnɛs puˈlɪdɔ]; born May 20, 1972) is a Filipino journalist and one of the two hosts of Reporter's Notebook, a current affairs programme on the Philippines terrestrial television channel GMA Network with Jiggy Manicad (now replaced by Jun Veneracion). Pulido was an anchor for the afternoon daily newscast on GMA News TV entitled Balita Pilipinas Ngayon, alongside Mark Salazar. She was also an anchor of State of the Nation alongside Atom Araullo.

== Personal life ==
Pulido is the daughter of Alice and Nestor Pulido. Alice Pulido was the former Mayor of Anda, a town in Pangasinan, Philippines. Nestor Pulido, Maki's father and Alice Pulido's husband, is also the former Mayor of Anda. She has a daughter and son of her own.

== Professional life ==
Pulido became a household name when the whole nation watched her run across Malacaňang (the official residence of the Presidential Family) to her camera crew, keen on delivering the exclusive update on the Estrada family behind Palace gates. Her passion for the news extends to covering significant national issues. At the close of the Subic rape trial in December 2006, Pulido was again running in her effort to deliver the latest on the convicted US Marine as he was brought to the detention center, amid pressure from the foreigner's security escorts.

Pulido's zeal for reporting has won her both local and international acclaim. Her in-depth report on Filipinos who illegally enter Malaysia through the country's "backdoor" won the Silver Screen Award at the 2005 US International Film and Video Festival. The same story was also highly commended at the Asian TV Awards the same year. In 2007, the US International Film and Video Festival awarded third place to her reports entitled Slaughterhouse and Trigger. She has also had the honor of having two of her stories, Batang Kargador (Child Haulers) and Sex Slaves named Finalists at the New York Film Festival. In 2008, she won the Gold World Medal for Best Human Interest Story for Batang Kalakal.

== Congressional elections ==
She resigned as a journalist in late 2009 to run for a seat in the first legislative district of Pangasinan under the Pwersa ng Masang Pilipino in 2010 elections. She lost to former Bolinao Mayor Jesus Celeste and vowed never to run again for any election. In 2013, her brother Leonido lost to Celeste.
