= GMA Network Center =

Headquarters of Philippines media company

General information
- Type: High-rise
- Architectural style: Modernism
- Location: EDSA corner Timog Avenue, Barangay South Triangle, Quezon City, Metro Manila, Philippines
- Coordinates: 14.6334°N 121.0440°E
- Construction started: 1996; 30 years ago
- Completed: 2000; 26 years ago
- Opened: June 14, 2000; 26 years ago
- Inaugurated: June 14, 2000; 26 years ago
- Cost: US$46 million
- Owner: GMA Network

Height
- Height: 64.39 meters (211.3 ft)

Technical details
- Floor count: 17

Design and construction
- Architect: Roger Villarosa

The GMA Network Center is the headquarters of the Filipino media and entertainment company GMA Network Inc. and its subsidiaries located in EDSA corner Timog Avenue, Diliman, Quezon City, Philippines. It is the company's main television and radio production center, broadcast complex, and its main transmission facility for most of Metro Manila. The building houses Super Radyo DZBB 594 AM, Barangay LS 97.1 FM, GMA-7 and GTV-27.

GMA inaugurated the facility on June 14, 2000 as part of the company's 50th anniversary celebrations. While the first phase of the project has already been completed with the completion of the 17-storey high-rise building, the center has an option to upgrade the older, existing facilities in the GMA compound, as originally planned.

== Offices ==
GMA Network Center serves as the corporate office of the company. Most of the core departments of the company like the human resources, finance, and marketing are located in the building. The newsroom of GMA News is located on the 2nd floor. The production offices and staff offices of GMA Public Affairs, GMA Entertainment Group, GMA Regional TV, and GMA International are also based on the building. The company's post-production unit, engineering department, program management, and talent development (Sparkle GMA Artist Center) are also located in the building.

Some of the company's subsidiaries are also based here. The GMA New Media, Inc. (NMI) and its subsidiary, Digify are located in the twelfth floor while the Worldwide division of the company is on tenth floor. Also, the management and staffs of GMA Pictures, GMA Music, and Script2010 are located here.

== The Complex ==
The GMA Network complex has a total area of 17,184 square meters (184,970 sq ft) (including the 4,053 sqm Studio Annex) located in EDSA corner Timog Avenue, Barangay South Triangle, Diliman, Quezon City. The complex is the main headquarters and the main radio and television production hub of the company. It contains several buildings, including the GMA Network Center and GMA Network Studio Annex.

The company has held office in the complex beginning in 1957 with its television broadcasts started in 1961, having moved from the Calvo Building along Escolta in Binondo, Manila. At that building, the company, then known as Loreto F. de Hemedes, Inc., later renamed Republic Broadcasting System, had its first studios and corporate offices since its inception in 1950.

The complex contains five studios and various production hubs for its production arms, GMA News, GMA Public Affairs and GMA Entertainment Group. It also houses radio studios for Super Radyo DZBB 594 kHz and Barangay LS 97.1, as well as recording studios for GMA Music. A convenience store, canteen, and ATM are also available serving the employees working in the complex.

The buildings between the Network Center and Studio Annex contains several studios and production offices, as well as the GMA Kapuso Center, where the GMA Kapuso Foundation, the GMA Action Center, and the office of the public service show, Kapwa Ko Mahal Ko. One of the buildings here served as the studios and offices of Barangay LS 97.1 and Super Radyo DZBB before moving to the Studio Annex. In 2023, the building was demolished and is currently being used as a parking lot.

On the Network Center's front, a sculpture called "Beyond Broadcasting" was built and designed by the artist, Eduardo Castrillo.

Displayed inside the ground floor, a picture gallery dubbed as "Kapuso Photo Wall" featuring the company's artists and news personalities was unveiled on February 7, 2025, in commemoration of its 75th anniversary.

== Studios ==
GMA Network has five studios in the complex. The studios were named Studios 2, 3, 5, 6 (German Moreno Studio) and 7. Three of the studios (Studios 2, 3, and 5) are located in the GMA Network Center while the German Moreno Studio and Studio 7 are located on the GMA Network Studio Annex. Studios 2, 3, and 5 are currently used by GMA Integrated News and GMA Public Affairs programs. While the remaining studios are being used by entertainment programs, and German Moreno Studio and Studio 7 are used by large production that needs large audience or big set. All the studios in the complex is in high-definition and considered state-of-the-art.

- Studio 2 – is the second smallest studio in the complex. The studio is equipped with HD video systems and cameras, as well as audio systems like audio mixer and overrides. The studio is currently used by GTV's newscasts, Balitanghali, Usap-Usapan: What We Know So Far and State of the Nation, and GMA's investigative public service program, Resibo: Walang Lusot ang May Atraso. The green screen used on weather reports of GMA Integrated News' programs is also located here. In 2022, the studio was renovated for the Eleksyon 2022, the 2022 Philippine national and local elections coverage of GMA News and Public Affairs. The newly renovated studio was designed by the Emmy award-winning US firm, FX Design Group and uses the latest technology from Vizrt and Red Spy. It features LED video walls, color-changing panels, and an open-floor space.
- Studio 3 – is the third smallest studio in the complex. It is the home studio of the Philippines' longest-running morning show, Unang Hirit and select GMA Public Affairs shows, occasionally. In 2023, the studio was renovated, incorporating a 360-degree rotating platform, a modern-minimalist design set, technology from Vizrt and Red Spy, and engaging LED walls and monitors.
- Studio 5 - also known on-air as GMA News Headquarters, is the third largest studio in the complex. It is one of the most technologically advanced studio in the country. It is equipped with state-of-the-art broadcast equipment like HD video systems, audio systems, and cameras. In 2019, the studio was renovated. The renovation makes the studio equipped with augmented reality (AR) technology and immersive graphics by Vizrt. The studio has large video walls, video floors, and a lot of TV screens used by news programs. GMA's flagship newscasts, 24 Oras and its weekend edition, as well as the late night newscast, Saksi are being broadcast live in this studio.
- German Moreno Studio – also known as Studio 6, is the second largest studio of GMA. It is located in the GMA Network Studio Annex. The studio's total area is 638-square-meter (6,870 sq ft) that can accommodate an audience of more than 400. The studio was named after the late German Moreno on his 85th birthday on October 4, 2018. Like other studios, it is also equipped with HD video systems, audio systems, and lighting system. It is the former home of Moreno's late night show Walang Tulugan with the Master Showman and Willie Revillame's Wowowin, as well as Startalk, Showbiz Central, Pinoy Records and All-Star K!. The studio currently houses TiktoClock, IBilib, and is occasionally used in media conferences and contract signing events.
- Studio 7 - is a 1,020-square-meter (11,000 sq ft) studio in the GMA Network Studio Annex that can accommodate up to 600 audiences. It is the largest studio in the complex and one of the largest in the Philippines. The studio is equipped with HD video systems, lighting system, and state-of-the-art audio systems that can be used on musical shows, live concerts, television specials, media conferences and contract signing events. It is the first studio in the country installed with aluminum truss motorized suspension system. It is used by various shows of GMA like All-Out Sundays (as well as its predecessors SOP, Party Pilipinas, Sunday All Stars and Sunday PinaSaya), Bubble Gang, and most of the reality and game shows produced by the network.

In 2023, the old GMA Building has been demolished. The following studios were in the old building:

- Studio 1 - formerly Studio A. It was one of the oldest and smallest studios in the complex. Some of GMA News TV's defunct programs were being taped here. The studio was occupied by the newscasts of GMA, the weeklong noontime variety show, Student Canteen and Saturday afternoon showbiz-oriented talk show Startalk.
- Studio 4 - formerly Studio B, was the fourth largest studio in the complex. The studio was occupied by the Saturday morning talk and lifestyle show, Sarap, 'Di Ba? as well as other notable programs including GMA Supershow and Lunch Date.

Additionally, in the GMA Network Center's seventeenth floor, where the media conferences are also held, serves as the location for the studio of GMA's daily afternoon talk show Fast Talk with Boy Abunda and GTV's Sunday primetime talk show Kalurks!.

== GMA Network Studio Annex ==
GMA Network Studio Annex

General information
- Type: Television studio, office
- Location: Diliman, Quezon City, Philippines
- Groundbreaking: 2006
- Construction started: 2006; 20 years ago
- Opened: October 17, 2008; 18 years ago
- Inaugurated: October 17, 2008; 18 years ago
- Cost: ₱1 billion
- Owner: GMA Network Inc.

Technical details
- Floor count: 4

GMA Network Studio Annex is a 4-storey television facility owned by GMA Network. It was built in a 4,308-square-meter (46,370 sq ft) land that is part of the 17,184-square-meter (184,970 sq ft) complex in Brgy. South Triangle, Diliman, Quezon City. The structure costs as much as ₱1 billion. The construction began in 2006 and completed in 2008.

The building houses two state-of-the art HD studios, as well as offices for GMA Network's subsidiaries and departments. It also houses studio support facilities, set construction facilities, set and props storage, and facilities for broadcast equipment. Some production offices of GMA Integrated News, GMA Public Affairs and GMA Entertainment Group are located on the third and fourth floor of the building. Aside from offices, the building has also rehearsal rooms, dressing rooms, and make-up room for the company's talents, as well as conference rooms and editing rooms for pre-production and post-production of programs. A bridge also connects the building to the rest of the compound.

The Studio Annex was unveiled on October 17, 2008, with a red carpet event attended by the company's personalities, executives and government officials including the country's then-president Gloria Macapagal-Arroyo and then-vice president Noli de Castro.

In 2021, RGMA Network, the owner of Super Radyo DZBB and Barangay LS 97.1, moved to the third floor of the building. The new office has two studios (one for the FM station and one for AM station), as well as technical rooms for radio and television broadcasting and offices for anchors and management.

=== Studios ===
There are two studios in the building, the German Moreno Studio (formerly Studio 6) and the Studio 7. Both studios are equipped with HD video system, audio equipment, and lighting system, as well as self-climbing hoist that is used in big studios, theaters, and concert halls worldwide. Also, both studios are equipped with Digital Speaker Management systems that standardize digital feedback elimination, ensure accurate sound quality, and allow studio-to-studio link for multi-studio audio communication.

In terms of audio equipment, both studios are designed for musical shows and live concerts through their state-of-the-art audio systems.

The building is located next to the GMA–Kamuning MRT station and EDSA, so loud noise from these is a major problem for the studios. As a solution, the company used box-in-a-box concept or room-in-a-room concept wherein the walls of the studios are located inside the building to block the noise from outside. The visible room is enclosed with a bigger room acting as a sound barrier.

== Kapuso Walk of Fame ==
On March 24, 2014, GMA Network launched its own version of "Walk of Fame" at the studios' walkway. It consists of over 190 embedded stars bearing the names of various local celebrities, news and public affairs personalities. The concept of this "Walk of Fame" was done by the late German Moreno, who was also behind the Eastwood City's Walk of Fame.

== Future ==
GMA Network plans to construct a new building and state-of-the-art studios within the complex.
