= Jessica Soho =

Filipino journalist and host (born 1964)

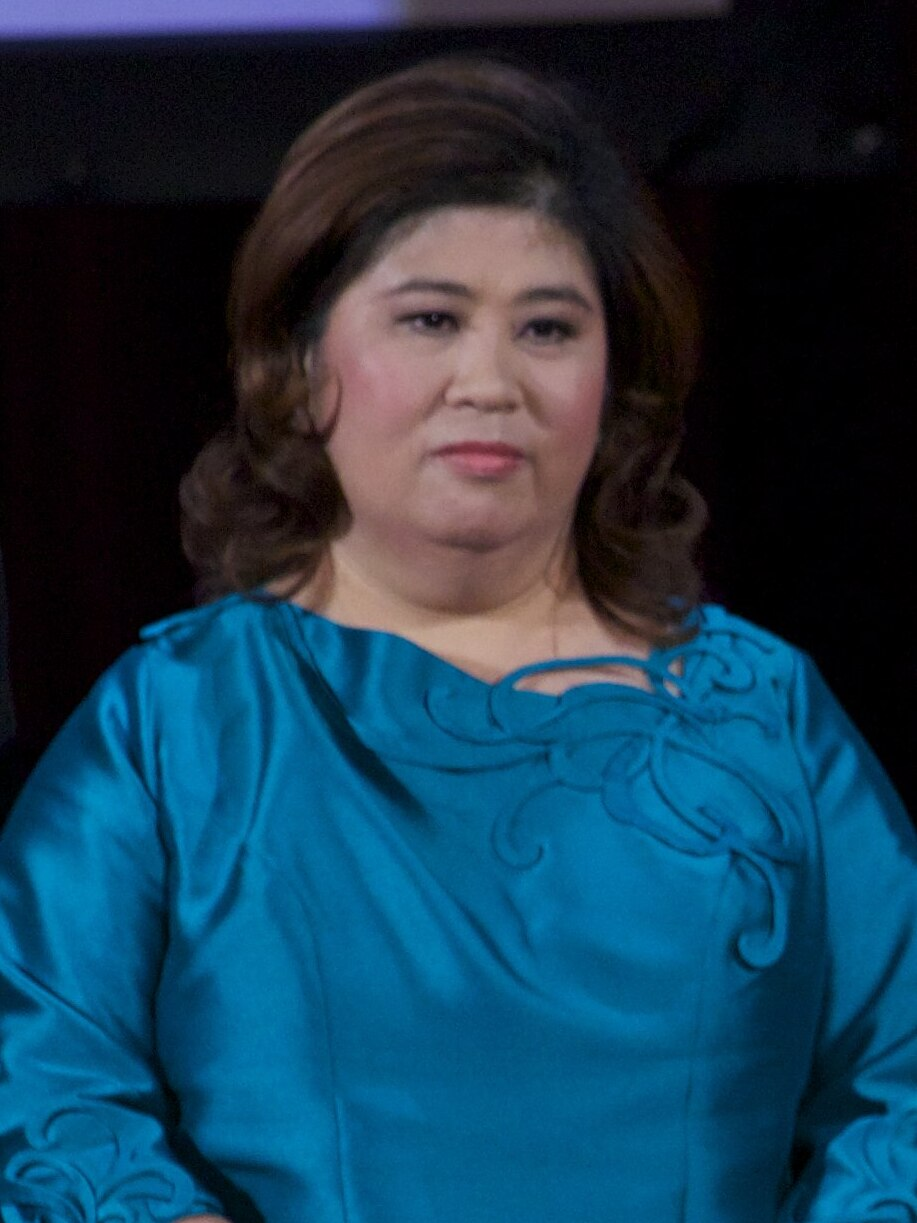
- Soho in 2014
- Born: Maria Jessica Aspiras Soho; March 27, 1964 (age 62); San Fernando, La Union, Philippines
- Education: University of the Philippines Diliman
- Occupations: Journalist; presenter
- Years active: 1985–present

Maria Jessica Aspiras Soho (Tagalog: [ˌdʒɛsiˈka ˈsɔho]; born March 27, 1964) is a Filipino broadcast journalist affiliated with GMA Network. She is the host of the news magazine program Kapuso Mo, Jessica Soho on GMA, and was the news anchor for State of the Nation on GMA News TV (now GTV) from 2011 to 2021.

Soho is a multi-awarded journalist. In 1998, Soho became the first Filipino to win the British Fleet Street Award for Journalism. In 1999, Soho and the I-Witness team received the Philippines' first Peabody Award for producing the "Kidneys for Sale" and "Kamao" documentaries. Soho's story of a hostage crisis in Cagayan Valley made her the first Filipino to win in the New York Film Festival.

== Early life ==
Maria Jessica Aspiras Soho was born on March 27, 1964, in San Fernando, La Union, Philippines. Her parents are Abelardo Soho, a government employee, and Maura Aspiras, an agriculturist. Soho's grandmothers, Sixta "Apo Ittang" Aspiras and Concepción "Cion" Soho, influenced her in telling stories. She is of Cantonese descent through her paternal grandfather with the surname Szeto ( 司徒; later baptized "Pedro Szeto" or "Pedro Soho"), who immigrated to the Philippines from Kaiping County, Guangdong, China, in the early 20th century.

In her high school years, she attended Christ The King College (La Union) and after graduating, Soho went on to attend the University of the Philippines Diliman to study mass communication. One of her professors was Luis Beltran, who inspired Soho to finish her studies and practice journalism in Manila.

== Career ==
Soho joined GMA News and GMA Public Affairs in January 1985. Soho's first voice-over report was a feature story on the inauguration of the Manila Line 1 from Baclaran to Monumento. Soho was later assigned to the defense and military beats.

In 1991, Soho earned a Bronze Award at the New York Film Festival for her coverage of a hostage crisis in Cagayan Valley, the first for a Filipino. She also received the Ka Doroy Valencia Award given by the Kapisanan ng mga Brodkaster ng Pilipinas. In 1994, she received the Grand Prize from the Asia-Pacific Broadcasting Union for her coverage of a breaking news story. Soho is included in the list of 100 Filipino Women of Distinction chosen during the Philippine Centennial celebrations.

Soho helped conceptualize the one-hour documentary television program I-Witness, which she co-presented from its premiere in 1999 to 2004. The I-Witness documentaries "Kidneys for Sale" and "Kamao" made her the first Filipino reporter, with GMA Network as the first Filipino network, to win a Peabody Award in 1999. She won the Asian Television Award for Best News and Current Affairs Special for the 2001 "Saksi Sa Kasaysayan" documentary.

In 2014, Soho's GMA news programs Kapuso Mo, Jessica Soho and State of the Nation with Jessica Soho were recognized by the Peabody Awards for their coverage on Super Typhoon Yolanda. State of the Nation also earned Soho consecutive wins for Most Trusted News Presenter by Reader's Digest Asia.

In 2015, Soho was given an honorary doctorate in humanities by the University of Northeastern Philippines during its 67th commencement exercises on April.

== Controversies ==
In May 2013, a controversy sparked involving Soho and comedian Vice Ganda, involving a joke directed at the anchor during the latter's concert held at the Smart Araneta Coliseum in Quezon City. Vice mentioned Soho, among several other personalities, in a stand-up skit involving celebrities starring in a hypothetical pornographic film, adding that Soho would be gang raped if she were cast, as well as making several jokes ridiculing her weight. Vice Ganda later issued a public apology during his regular appearances in It's Showtime, admitting to his wrongdoing and that he offended Soho and several others with his jokes. Soho later acknowledged Vice's apology but she denied any intent to close any further discussion with the comedian.

In June 2021, Nas Daily announced that Soho, among other known Filipino personalities, which include Miss Universe 2018 Catriona Gray, fashion designer Michael Cinco, and food vlogger Erwan Heussaff would teach courses through his Nas Academy. However, following the Whang-od controversy, Jessica Soho has made a statement that she would no longer pursue the Jessica Soho course in Nas Academy.

In January 2022, Soho was accused of being "biased" against Bongbong Marcos, a presidential candidate in the 2022 Philippine presidential election, by his spokesman Vic Rodriguez after declining to participate in The Jessica Soho Presidential Interviews on GMA Network. GMA responded to Rodriguez's claim on Marcos' absence, saying "Throughout her career, Ms. Soho has consistently been named the most trusted media personality in the Philippines by both local and foreign organizations, a testament to her embodiment of the GMA News and Public Affairs ethos: 'Walang Kinikilingan, Walang Pinoprotektahan, Serbisyong Totoo Lamang'".

== Accolades ==
=== International recognitions ===
British Embassy in Manila

| Year | Category | Result | Ref. |
|---|---|---|---|
| 1998 | Fleet Street Awardee for Investigative Journalism | Won | |

Reader's Digest Trusted Brands Asia

| Year | Category | Nominated work | Result | Ref. |
|---|---|---|---|---|
| 2011 | Digest's Most Trusted News Presenter | State of the Nation with Jessica Soho | Won | |
| 2012 | Digest's Most Trusted News Presenter | State of the Nation with Jessica Soho | Won | |
| 2013 | Digest's Most Trusted News Presenter | State of the Nation with Jessica Soho | Won | |
| 2014 | Digest's Most Trusted News Presenter | State of the Nation with Jessica Soho | Won | |
| 2015 | Digest's Most Trusted News Presenter | State of the Nation with Jessica Soho | Won | |
| 2016 | Digest's Most Trusted News Presenter | State of the Nation with Jessica Soho | Won | |
| 2017 | Digest's Most Trusted News Presenter | State of the Nation with Jessica Soho | Won | |

=== Local recognitions ===
Adamson University

| Year | Category | Result | Ref. |
|---|---|---|---|
| 2012 | Adamson University Media Award | Won | |

ALTA Media Icon Awards

| Year | Category | Nominated work | Result | Ref. |
|---|---|---|---|---|
| 2015 | Best Magazine Program Host | Kapuso Mo, Jessica Soho | Won | |

Anak TV Seal Award

| Year | Category | Result | Ref. |
|---|---|---|---|
| 2007 | Most Admired Female Personality Awardee | Won | |
| 2008 | Most Admired Female Personality Awardee | Won | |
| 2009 | Most Admired Female Personality Awardee | Won | |
| 2010 | Most Admired Female Personality Awardee | Won | |
| 2011 | Most Admired Female Personality Awardee | Won | |
| 2012 | Most Admired Female Personality Awardee | Won | |
| 2013 | Hall of Famer | Won | |

Catholic Mass Media Awards

| Year | Category | Nominated work | Result | Ref. |
|---|---|---|---|---|
| 2002 | Best Public Affairs Show Host | Jessica Soho Reports | Won | |

CCP Gawad Natatanging Parangal

| Year | Category | Result | Ref. |
|---|---|---|---|
| 1989 | Special Award | Won | |
| 1990 | Special Award | Won | |

CLASS Awards (City of Malabon University)

| Year | Category | Nominated work | Result | Ref. |
|---|---|---|---|---|
| 2014 | Most Outstanding Female News Presenter of the Year | State of the Nation with Jessica Soho | Won | |

COMGUILD Center for Journalism

| Year | Category | Result | Ref. |
|---|---|---|---|
| 2015 | Media Persona of Excellence | Won | |
| 2015 | Hall of Fame for the Most Outstanding Female News Presenter | Won | |

EdukCircle Awards

| Year | Category | Result | Ref. |
|---|---|---|---|
| 2012 | World Achiever in Documentary | Won | |
| 2012 | Most Outstanding Filipino Documentarian of All Time | Won | |
| 2013 | Most Outstanding Journalist of the Year | Won | |
| 2014 | Best Female News Anchor of the Year | Won | |
| 2015 | Best Female News Anchor of the Year | Won | |
| 2016 | Best Magazine Show Host | Won | |

Federation of Philippine Industries, Inc.

| Year | Category | Result | Ref. |
|---|---|---|---|
| 2014 | Bayabay Media Award | Won | |

FemaleNetwork.com

| Year | Category | Result | Ref. |
|---|---|---|---|
| 2013 | Womanity Award in the field of Media | Won | |

Gawad Duyan Awards

| Year | Category | Nominated work | Result | Ref. |
|---|---|---|---|---|
| 2014 | Himay-Ulat Award | State of the Nation with Jessica Soho | Won | |

Gawad Pasado Awards

| Year | Category | Result | Ref. |
|---|---|---|---|
| 2015 | PinakaPASADOng Mamamahayag sa Larangan ng Kamalayang Pilipino | Won | |

Golden Dove Awards

| Year | Category | Nominated work | Result | Ref. |
|---|---|---|---|---|
| 2002 | Best Public Affairs Show Host | Jessica Soho Reports | Won | |

International Association of Business Communicators (IABC) Philippines

| Year | Category | Result | Ref. |
|---|---|---|---|
| 2014 | CEO Excel Award | Won | |

International Business and Academe Conference's Service Excellence and Partners Awards

| Year | Category | Nominated work | Result | Ref. |
|---|---|---|---|---|
| 2013 | Best TV Public Affairs Host | Kapuso Mo, Jessica Soho | Won | |
| 2013 | Outstanding Broadcaster of the Year | —N/a | Won | |

International Center for Communication Studies (ICCS)

| Year | Category | Result | Ref. |
|---|---|---|---|
| 2012 | Most Outstanding Filipino Documentarian of All Time | Won | |

Kapisanan ng mga Brodkaster ng Pilipinas

| Year | Category | Result | Ref. |
|---|---|---|---|
| 1999 | Best Host in Golden Dove Awards | Won | |
| 1999 | Broadcaster of the Year (Ka Doroy Valnecia Award) | Won | |

Mary Kay Philippines

| Year | Category | Result | Ref. |
|---|---|---|---|
| 2003 | Women with a Heart Award | Won | |

Metro Pacific Corporation Journalism Awards

| Year | Category | Nominated work | Result | Ref. |
|---|---|---|---|---|
| 1997 | Political Reporter of the Year Award | "The Ipil Massacre" coverage | Won | |

Metrobank Foundation

| Year | Category | Result | Ref. |
|---|---|---|---|
| 2001 | Outstanding Broadcast Journalist Award | Won | |

MTRCB TV Awards

| Year | Category | Nominated work | Result | Ref. |
|---|---|---|---|---|
| 2009 | Best Female Host | Kapuso Mo, Jessica Soho | Won | |

Paragala Awards

| Year | Category | Nominated work | Result | Ref. |
|---|---|---|---|---|
| 2015 | Best Magazine Show Host | Kapuso Mo, Jessica Soho | Won | |
| 2015 | Best News Program Female Anchor | State of the Nation with Jessica Soho | Won | |

Platinum Stallion Media Awards

| Year | Category | Nominated work | Result | Ref. |
|---|---|---|---|---|
| 2015 | Best Female News Anchor | State of the Nation with Jessica Soho | Won | |

PMAP Makatao Awards for Media Excellence

| Year | Category | Nominated work | Result | Ref. |
|---|---|---|---|---|
| 2015 | Best TV Public Affairs Program Host | State of the Nation with Jessica Soho | Won | |

PMPC Star Awards for Television

| Year | Category | Nominated work | Result | Ref. |
|---|---|---|---|---|
| 2002 | Best Magazine Show Host | Jessica Soho Reports | Won | |
| 2003 | Best Magazine Show Host | Jessica Soho Reports | Nominated | |
| 2004 | Best Magazine Show Host | Jessica Soho Reports | Nominated | |
| 2006 | Best Magazine Show Host | Kapuso Mo, Jessica Soho | Nominated | |
| 2007 | Best Public Service Program Host | Sana'y Muling Makapiling | Nominated | |
| 2007 | Best Magazine Show Host | Kapuso Mo, Jessica Soho | Nominated | |
| 2008 | Best Public Service Program Host | Reunions | Nominated | |
| 2008 | Best Public Affairs Program Host | Hot Seat | Won | |
| 2008 | Best Magazine Show Host | Kapuso Mo, Jessica Soho | Nominated | |
| 2009 | Best Public Service Program Host | Reunions | Nominated | |
| 2009 | Best Magazine Show Host | Kapuso Mo, Jessica Soho | Won | |
| 2010 | Best Public Service Program Host | Reunions | Nominated | |
| 2010 | Best Magazine Show Host | Kapuso Mo, Jessica Soho | Won | |
| 2011 | Best Female Newscaster | State of the Nation with Jessica Soho | Won | |
| 2011 | Best Public Affairs Program Host | Brigada | Nominated | |
| 2011 | Best Magazine Show Host | Kapuso Mo, Jessica Soho | Nominated | |
| 2011 | Excellence in Broadcasting Lifetime Achievement Award | —N/a | Won | |
| 2012 | Best Magazine Show Host | Kapuso Mo, Jessica Soho | Won | |
| 2012 | Best Female Newscaster | State of the Nation with Jessica Soho | Nominated | |
| 2013 | Best Public Service Program Host | Reunions | Nominated | |
| 2013 | Best Magazine Show Host | Kapuso Mo, Jessica Soho | Won | |
| 2013 | Best Female Newscaster | State of the Nation with Jessica Soho | Nominated | |
| 2014 | Best Documentary Program Host | Brigada | Nominated | |
| 2014 | Best Magazine Show Host | Kapuso Mo, Jessica Soho | Nominated | |
| 2014 | Best Female Newscaster | State of the Nation with Jessica Soho | Won | |
| 2015 | Best Magazine Show Host | Kapuso Mo, Jessica Soho | Nominated' | |
| 2015 | Best Female Newscaster | State of the Nation with Jessica Soho | Won | |

School Press Advisers Movement (SPAM)

| Year | Category | Result | Ref. |
|---|---|---|---|
| 2014 | Award of Excellence in the Field of Broadcasting | Won | |

PUP Mabini Media Awards

| Year | Category | Nominated work | Result | Ref. |
|---|---|---|---|---|
| 2014 | Best Television Female News Program Anchor | State of the Nation with Jessica Soho | Won | |
| 2014 | Best Television Magazine Program Host | Kapuso Mo, Jessica Soho | Won | |

The Outstanding Women in the Nation's Service (TOWNS)

| Year | Category | Result | Ref. |
|---|---|---|---|
| 2001 | Broadcast Journalism | Won | |

Ten Outstanding Young Men (TOYM) Award

| Year | Category | Result | Ref. |
|---|---|---|---|
| 1993 | Ten Outstanding Young Men (TOYM) Award | Won | |

Rotary Club of Manila

| Year | Category | Result | Ref. |
|---|---|---|---|
| 1989 | TV Journalist of the Year | Won | |
| 1990 | TV Journalist of the Year | Won | |
| 2003 | Hall of Fame, Journalism Awards for Broadcast Journalism | Won | |

UmalohokJUAN Awards

| Year | Category | Nominated work | Result | Ref. |
|---|---|---|---|---|
| 2015 | Best News Anchor | State of the Nation with Jessica Soho | Won | |

UPLB Gandingan Awards

| Year | Category | Nominated work | Result | Ref. |
|---|---|---|---|---|
| 2008 | Best Magazine Program Host | Kapuso Mo, Jessica Soho | Won | |
| 2011 | Best Magazine Program Host | Kapuso Mo, Jessica Soho | Won | |
| 2012 | Best Magazine Program Host | Kapuso Mo, Jessica Soho | Won | |
| 2012 | Hall of Fame for Best Magazine Program Host | Kapuso Mo, Jessica Soho | Won | |
| 2013 | Best News Anchor | State of the Nation with Jessica Soho | Won | |
| 2015 | Best News Anchor | State of the Nation with Jessica Soho | Won | |
| 2015 | Best Investigative Program Host | Brigada | Won | |
| 2015 | Best Magazine Program Host | Kapuso Mo, Jessica Soho | Won | |

USTv Students' Choice Awards

| Year | Category | Nominated work | Result | Ref. |
|---|---|---|---|---|
| 2013 | Best Female News & Current Affairs Program Host | State of the Nation with Jessica Soho | Won | |
| 2014 | Students' Choice of Magazine Program Host | Kapuso Mo, Jessica Soho | Won | |
| 2014 | Students' Choice for News Program Host | State of the Nation with Jessica Soho | Won | |
| 2014 | Student Leaders' Choice of TV Personality | —N/a | Won | |
| 2015 | Students' Choice for Female News Host | State of the Nation with Jessica Soho | Won | |

== Honors ==
- Doctor of Humanities, Honoris Causa – University of Northeastern Philippines (2015)
