= Resibo: Walang Lusot ang May Atraso =

Philippine television investigative show

- Title card since 2024
- Genre: Investigative journalism; Public broadcasting
- Presented by: Emil Sumangil
- Opening theme: "Resibo" by Arkin Magalona and Jessica Villarubin
- Country of origin: Philippines
- Original language: Tagalog

Production
- Executive producer: Ian Carlos Simbulan
- Camera setup: Multiple-camera setup
- Running time: 30 minutes
- Production company: GMA Public Affairs

Original release
- Network: GMA Network
- Release: May 7, 2023 – present

Resibo: Walang Lusot ang May Atraso (transl. receipt: offenders cannot slip away) is a Philippine investigative public service show broadcast by GMA Network. Hosted by Emil Sumangil, it premiered on May 7, 2023, on the network's Sunday Grande sa Hapon line up.

The show is streaming online on YouTube.

== Accolades ==
Accolades received by Resibo: Walang Lusot ang May Atraso
Year	Award	Category	Recipient	Result	Ref.
2025	37th PMPC Star Awards for Television	Best Public Service Program	Resibo: Walang Lusot ang May Atraso	Nominated	
2025	37th PMPC Star Awards for Television	Best Public Service Program Host	Emil Sumangil	Nominated	
2025	38th PMPC Star Awards for Television	Best Public Service Program	Resibo: Walang Lusot ang May Atraso	Nominated	
2025	38th PMPC Star Awards for Television	Best Public Service Program Host	Emil Sumangil	Nominated	
