= 38th PMPC Star Awards for Television =

Awards for Piilippine TV in 2024

- Date: March 23, 2025; April 5, 2025 (Delayed Telecast)
- Location: Dolphy Theatre, ABS-CBN Broadcasting Center, Quezon City
- Presented by: Philippine Movie Press Club
- Hosted by: Kim Chiu; Piolo Pascual; Alden Richards

Television/radio coverage
- Network: A2Z
- Produced by: Airtime Marketing Philippines Inc. Myriad Entertainment; Precision Digital Broadcast Solutions Inc.
- Directed by: Eric Quizon

The 38th PMPC Star Awards for Television honors the best in Philippine television programming of 2024, as chosen by the Philippine Movie Press Club. The ceremony is held on March 23, 2025, at the Dolphy Theatre in ABS-CBN Broadcasting Center, Quezon City, and was aired as the delayed telecast by A2Z on April 5, 2025. This is the second time in the history of the award-giving body that it has skipped the 4th Quarter of the previous year. The ceremony was hosted by Kim Chiu, Piolo Pascual and Alden Richards.

The nominations were announced by the Press on February 1, 2025. And the winners were announced.

== Winners and Nominees ==
Winners are listed first and highlighted in bold:

=== Networks ===
Best TV Station
- **GMA 7**
  - All TV 2
  - PTV 4
  - TV5
  - RPTV 9
  - A2Z 11
  - IBC 13
  - Aliw 23
  - Net 25
  - GTV 27
  - UNTV 37
  - INC TV 48
  - Bilyonaryo News Channel
  - Knowledge Channel

=== Programs ===
Best Primetime Drama Series	Best Daytime Drama Series
**FPJ's Batang Quiapo (A2Z 11/TV5)**; Black Rider (GMA 7); Can’t Buy Me Love (A2Z 11/TV5); Lavender Fields (A2Z 11/TV5); Linlang (A2Z 11/TV5); Pamilya Sagrado (A2Z 11/TV5); Pulang Araw (GMA 7); Widow's War (GMA 7)	**Abot-Kamay na Pangarap (GMA 7)**; Ang Himala ni Niño (TV5); Lilet Matias: Attorney-at-Law (GMA 7); Makiling (GMA 7); Nag-aapoy na Damdamin (A2Z 11/TV5); Padyak Princess (TV5); Pira-Pirasong Paraiso (A2Z 11/TV5); Stolen Life (GMA 7)
Best Drama Anthology	Best Drama Mini Series
**Magpakailanman (GMA 7)**; Landas ng Buhay (INC TV 48); Love, Bosleng and Tali (Net 25); Regal Studio Presents (GMA 7); Tadhana (GMA 7)	**Walang Matigas na Pulis sa Matinik na Misis (GMA 7)**; Daig Kayo ng Lola Ko (GMA 7); Maka (GMA 7); Sparkle U (GMA 7); Zoomers (A2Z 11/TV5)
Best Comedy Show	Best Variety Show
**Pepito Manaloto (GMA 7)**; 3-iN-1 (Net 25); Da Pers Family (TV5); Goin' Bulilit (A2Z 11/All TV 2); GoodWill (Net 25); May For Ever (Net 25); Oh No! It's B.O. (Net 25)	**It's Showtime (A2Z 11/All TV 2/GMA 7/GTV 27)**; The Boobay and Tekla Show (GMA 7); All-Out Sundays (GMA 7); TiktoClock (GMA 7)
Best Musical Variety Show	Best Game Show
**Letters and Music (Net 25)**; MusicKover (INC TV 48)	**Wil To Win (TV5)**; Everybody, Sing! (A2Z 11/TV5); Rainbow Rumble (A2Z 11/TV5)
Best Celebrity Talk Show	Best Showbiz-Oriented Talk Show
**My Mother, My Story (GMA 7)**; Julius Babao Unplugged (TV5); Korina Interviews (Net 25); Kuan on One (A2Z 11); Magandang ARAw (Net 25); Magandang Buhay (A2Z 11/All TV 2)	**Fast Talk with Boy Abunda (GMA 7)**; Marites University (All TV 2)
Best News Program	Best Public Affairs Program
**Agenda (Bilyonaryo News Channel)**; 24 Oras (GMA 7); Frontline Pilipinas (TV5); Mata ng Agila (Net 25); Saksi (GMA 7); State of the Nation (GTV 27); TV Patrol (A2Z 11/All TV 2)	**Cayetano in Action with Boy Abunda (GMA 7)**; **On Point (Bilyonaryo News Channel)**; Ang Senado ng Pilipinas (IBC 13); Ano Sa Palagay N'yo? (Net 25); Face to Face (TV5); Iskoolmates (PTV 4); Open For Business (Net 25)
Best Morning Show	Best Public Service Program
**Unang Hirit (GMA 7)**; Good Morning Kuya (UNTV 37); Gud Morning Kapatid (TV5); It's A Beautiful Day (Bilyonaryo News Channel); Kada Umaga (Net 25); Love Tonipet and Everythaaang! (Net 25); Rise and Shine Pilipinas (PTV 4); Your Light Forever (INC TV 48)	**Wish Ko Lang! (GMA 7)**; At the Moment With Imee (All TV 2); Dear SV (GMA 7); Healing Galing (GMA 7); Kapatid Mo, Idol Raffy Tulfo (TV5); Kapwa Ko Mahal Ko (GMA 7); Resibo: Walang Lusot ang May Atraso (GMA 7)
Best Documentary Program	Best Sports Show
**The Atom Araullo Specials (GMA 7)**; Cabinet @ Work (IBC 13); Paninindigan (INC TV 48); Public Eye (PTV 4); Reporter's Notebook (GMA 7); Turning Point (INC TV 48)	**The Scorecard (Bilyonaryo News Channel)**; PTV Sports (PTV 4)
Best Magazine Show	Best Lifestyle/Travel Show
**Kapuso Mo, Jessica Soho (GMA 7)**; Business Matters (GTV 27); Good News (GTV 27); IJuander (GTV 27); Rated Korina (A2Z 11/TV5); Tao Po! (A2Z 11); Top 5: Mga Kwentong Marc Logan (TV5)	**I Heart PH (GTV 27)**; Biyahe ni Drew (GTV 27); Eat's Fun (PTV 4); Farm to Table (GTV 27); The Lifestyle Lab (Bilyonaryo News Channel); Motorcycle Republic (Net 25); ResTouRant (IBC 13)
Best Educational Program	Best Children Show
**Born to Be Wild (GMA 7)**; Aha! (GMA 7); iBilib (GMA 7); MathDali (Knowledge Channel); Negosyo Goals (GTV 27); Pera Paraan (GMA 7); Pinas Sarap (GTV 27); Puno ng Buhay (Knowledge Channel); Unlad: Kaagapay sa Hanapbuhay (Net 25)	**Talents Academy (IBC 13)**; Artsy Craftsy (PTV 4); KNC Show (UNTV 37); Little Juan's Playlist (INC TV 48); Wikaharian (Knowledge Channel)

=== Personalities ===
Best Drama Actor	Best Drama Actress
**Piolo Pascual – Pamilya Sagrado (A2Z 11/TV5)**; Paulo Avelino – Linlang (A2Z 11/TV5); David Licauco – Pulang Araw (GMA 7); Ruru Madrid – Black Rider (GMA 7); Coco Martin – FPJ's Batang Quiapo (A2Z 11/TV5); Alden Richards – Pulang Araw (GMA 7); Donny Pangilinan – Can’t Buy Me Love (A2Z 11/TV5); Jericho Rosales – Lavender Fields (A2Z 11/TV5)	**Kim Chiu – Linlang (A2Z 11/TV5)**; Bea Alonzo – Widow's War (GMA 7); Andrea Brillantes – Senior High and High Street (A2Z 11/TV5); Barbie Forteza – Pulang Araw (GMA 7); Belle Mariano – Can’t Buy Me Love (A2Z 11/TV5); Jennylyn Mercado – Love. Die. Repeat. (GMA 7); Marian Rivera – My Guardian Alien (GMA 7); Jodi Sta. Maria – Lavender Fields (A2Z 11/TV5)
Best Drama Supporting Actor	Best Drama Supporting Actress
**Arnold Reyes – My Guardian Alien (GMA 7)**; **Dennis Trillo – Pulang Araw (GMA 7)**; Elijah Canlas – FPJ's Batang Quiapo (A2Z 11/TV5); Christopher de Leon – FPJ's Batang Quiapo (A2Z 11/TV5); John Estrada – FPJ's Batang Quiapo (A2Z 11/TV5); Zaijian Jaranilla – Senior High (A2Z 11/TV5); Joel Lamangan – FPJ's Batang Quiapo (A2Z 11/TV5); Jon Lucas – Black Rider (GMA 7)	**Janine Gutierrez – Lavender Fields (A2Z 11/TV5)**; Pinky Amador – Abot-Kamay na Pangarap (GMA 7); Kaila Estrada – Linlang (A2Z 11/TV5); Glenda Garcia – Lilet Matias: Attorney-at-Law (GMA 7); Aiko Melendez – Pamilya Sagrado (A2Z 11/TV5); Rochelle Pangilinan – Pulang Araw (GMA 7); Cherry Pie Picache – FPJ's Batang Quiapo (A2Z 11/TV5); Maricel Soriano – Lavender Fields (A2Z 11/TV5)
Best Single Performance by An Actor	Best Single Performance by An Actress
**Paolo Contis – Magpakailanman: A Son's Karma (GMA 7)**; Boobay – Magpakailanman: Taylor Made Success (GMA 7); Mon Confiado – Tadhana: Sino Si Alice? (GMA 7); Ricky Davao – Magpakailanman: Papa's Boy (GMA 7); Martin del Rosario – Magpakailanman: Hostage In Israel (GMA 7); Gabby Eigenmann – Magpakailanman: A Christmas Miracle (GMA 7); Edgar Allan Guzman – Magpakailanman: The Rejected Son (GMA 7); Miguel Tanfelix – Magpakailanman: Kung Mawawala Ka (GMA 7)	**Gladys Reyes – Magpakailanman: Inaanak, Inanakan (GMA 7)**; Bea Alonzo – Magpakailanman: Always In My Mind (GMA 7); Michelle Dee – Magpakailanman: Wanted: Sperm Donor (GMA 7); Ai-Ai delas Alas – Magpakailanman: Inang Walang Pamilya (GMA 7); Mylene Dizon – Magpakailanman: A Christmas Miracle (GMA 7); Ara Mina – Tadhana: Sugar Daddy (GMA 7); Rhian Ramos – Magpakailanman: Wanted: Sperm Donor (GMA 7); Andrea Torres – Magpakailanman: Kung Mawawala Ka (GMA 7)
Best Child Performer	Best New Male TV Personality
**Zion Cruz – Ang Himala ni Niño (TV5)**; Brianna Advincula – Pulang Araw (GMA 7); Argus Aspiras – High Street (A2Z 11/TV5); Jeremiah Cruz – Can’t Buy Me Love (A2Z 11/TV5); TG Daylusan – Pulang Araw (GMA 7); Natalia Espejo – Lavender Fields (A2Z 11/TV5); Raphael Landicho – My Guardian Alien (GMA 7); Cassy Lavarias – Pulang Araw (GMA 7)	**Andres Muhlach – Da Pers Family (TV5)**; Drei Arias – May For Ever (Net 25); Sean John Bialoglovski – Goin' Bulilit (A2Z 11/All TV 2); Jarren Garcia – Pinoy Big Brother: Gen 11 Big 4 Ever (A2Z 11/TV5); Jeremiah Cruz – Goin' Bulilit (A2Z 11/All TV 2); Ralph de Leon – High Street (A2Z 11/TV5); JM Ibarra – Pinoy Big Brother: Gen 11 Big 4 Ever (A2Z 11/TV5); Dylan Menor – Maka (GMA 7); Jay Ortega – Pulang Araw (GMA 7); Matthew Uy – Widow's War (GMA 7)
Best New Female TV Personality	Best Comedy Actor
**Fyang Smith – Pinoy Big Brother: Gen 11 Big 4 Ever (A2Z 11/TV5)**; Bo Bautista – StarKada (Net 25); Quinn Carrillo – Asawa ng Asawa Ko (GMA 7); Ara Davao – FPJ's Batang Quiapo (A2Z 11/TV5); Chastity Dizon – Goin' Bulilit (A2Z 11/All TV 2); Angeli Khang – Black Rider (GMA 7); Kolette Madelo – Pinoy Big Brother: Gen 11 Big 4 Ever (A2Z 11/TV5); Salome Salvi – Black Rider (GMA 7); Tali Sotto – Love, Bosleng and Tali (Net 25); Shira Tweg – 3-iN 1 (Net 25)	**Roderick Paulate – Da Pers Family (TV5)**; Bayani Agbayani – Da Pers Family (TV5); Paolo Contis – Bubble Gang (GMA 7); Empoy Marquez – May For Ever (Net 25); Aga Muhlach – Da Pers Family (TV5); Eric Quizon – 3-iN-1 (Net 25); Michael V. – Bubble Gang (GMA 7)
Best Comedy Actress	Best Male TV Host
**Maricel Soriano – 3-iN-1 (Net 25)**; Alessandra de Rossi – May For Ever (Net 25); Kulot Caponpon – Goin' Bulilit (A2Z 11/All TV 2); Vangie Labalan – May For Ever (Net 25); Manilyn Reynes – Pepito Manaloto (GMA 7); Chariz Solomon – Bubble Gang (GMA 7); Nova Villa – Pepito Manaloto (GMA 7)	**Vic Sotto – Eat Bulaga (RPTV 9/TV5)**; Ogie Alcasid – It's Showtime (A2Z 11/All TV 2/GMA 7/GTV 27); Robi Domingo – ASAP (A2Z 11/TV5); Darren Espanto – It's Showtime (A2Z 11/All TV 2/GMA 7/GTV 27); Martin Nievera – ASAP (A2Z 11/TV5); Gary Valenciano – ASAP (A2Z 11/TV5); Vice Ganda – It's Showtime (A2Z 11/All TV 2/GMA 7/GTV 27)
Best Female TV Host	Best Musical Variety Show Host
**Anne Curtis – It's Showtime (A2Z 11/All TV 2/GMA 7/GTV 27)**; Kim Chiu – It's Showtime (A2Z 11/All TV 2/GMA 7/GTV 27); Karylle – It's Showtime (A2Z 11/All TV 2/GMA 7/GTV 27); Maine Mendoza – Eat Bulaga (RPTV 9/TV5); Amy Perez – It's Showtime (A2Z 11/All TV 2/GMA 7/GTV 27); Pokwang – TiktoClock (GMA 7); Regine Velasquez – ASAP (A2Z 11/TV5)	**Aikee – MusicKover (INC TV 48)**; Aaron Dy – Letters and Music (Net 25)
Best Game Show Host	Best Talent Search Program Host
**Dingdong Dantes – Family Feud (GMA 7)**; Luis Manzano – I Can See Your Voice (A2Z 11/TV5); Luis Manzano and Negi – Rainbow Rumble (A2Z 11/TV5); Vice Ganda – Everybody, Sing! (A2Z 11/TV5); Willie Revillame – Wil To Win (TV5)	**Rayver Cruz and Julie Anne San Jose – The Clash (GMA 7)**; Dingdong Dantes – The Voice Kids (GMA 7)
Best Reality Show Host	Best Celebrity Talk Show Host
**Melai Cantiveros, Kim Chiu, Enchong Dee, Robi Domingo, Bianca Gonzalez and Alexa Ilacad – Pinoy Big Brother: Gen 11 (A2Z 11/TV5)**; Robi Domingo – Pinoy Big Brother: Gen 11 Big 4 Ever (A2Z 11/TV5)	**Boy Abunda – My Mother, My Story (GMA 7)**; Julius Babao – Julius Babao Unplugged (TV5); Melai Cantiveros – Kuan on One (A2Z 11); Melai Cantiveros, Jolina Magdangal and Regine Velasquez – Magandang Buhay (A2Z 11/All TV 2); Ara Mina – Magandang ARAw (Net 25); Korina Sanchez – Korina Interviews (Net 25)
Best Showbiz-Oriented Talk Show Host	Best Male Newscaster
**Mr. Fu – Marites University (All TV 2)**; Rose Garcia – Marites University (All TV 2); Ambet Nabus – Marites University (All TV 2); Jun Nardo – Marites University (All TV 2)	**Noli de Castro – TV Patrol (A2Z 11/All TV 2)**; Atom Araullo – State of the Nation (GTV 27); Julius Babao – Frontline Pilipinas (TV5); Arnold Clavio – Saksi (GMA 7); Ivan Mayrina – 24 Oras Weekend (GMA 7); Emil Sumangil – 24 Oras (GMA 7); Raffy Tima – Balitanghali (GTV 27)
Best Female Newscaster	Best Public Affairs Program Host
**Korina Sanchez – Agenda (Bilyonaryo News Channel)**; Pia Arcangel – Saksi (GMA 7); Karen Davila – TV Patrol (A2Z 11/All TV 2); Angelique Lazo – Sentro Balita (PTV 4); Vicky Morales – 24 Oras (GMA 7); Bernadette Sembrano – TV Patrol (A2Z 11/All TV 2); Mel Tiangco – 24 Oras (GMA 7); Pinky Webb – Agenda (Bilyonaryo News Channel)	**Boy Abunda, Alan Peter Cayetano and Pia Cayetano – Cayetano in Action with Boy Abunda (GMA 7)**; Alex Calleja and Karla Estrada – Face to Face (TV5); Niña Corpuz – Bagong Pilipinas Ngayon (PTV 4); Pat-P Daza and Ali Sotto – Ano Sa Palagay N'yo? (Net 25); Angelique Lazo – In Person (PTV 4); Caesar Vallejos – Open For Business (Net 25); Pinky Webb – On Point (Bilyonaryo News Channel)
Best Morning Show Host	Best Public Service Program Host
**Lyn Ching-Pascual, Arnold Clavio, Gaby Concepcion, Shaira Diaz, Susan Enriquez, Suzi Entrata-Abrera, Matteo Guidicelli, Ivan Mayrina, Anjo Pertierra, JR Royol, Kaloy Tingcungco and Mariz Umali – Unang Hirit (GMA 7)**; Love Anover and Tonipet Gaba – Love Tonipet and Everythaaang! (Net 25); Alyssa Apsay, Jerome Dades, Angel Frank del Castillo, Anjelo Estacio, Bernadette Feucht, Aaron Reyes and Princess Ronquillo – Your Light Forever (INC TV 48); Jackie Aquino, Atty. Dot Gancayco, Daniel Razon and Annie Rentoy – Good Morning Kuya (UNTV 37); Anne Asis-Carilo, Paolo del Rosario and Monique Tuzon – It's A Beautiful Day (Bilyonaryo News Channel); Chi Atienza, Meiji Cruz, Hans Cua, Patrick de Jesus, Fifi Delos Santos, Joshua Garcia, Audrey Gorriceta, Rod Lagusad, Ryan Lesigues, Daniel Manalastas, Bien Manalo, Dianne Medina, Diane Querrer, Edmund Rosales and Noel Talacay – Rise and Shine Pilipinas (PTV 4); DJ Chacha, Maoui David, Ted Failon, Andrei Felix, Angela Lagunzad, Chiqui Roa-Puno and Dimples Romana – Gud Morning Kapatid (TV5); Pia Guanio, Daiana Menezes and Emma Tiglao – Kada Umaga (Net 25)	**Edinel Calvario – Healing Galing (GMA 7)**; Connie Angeles and Orly Mercado – Kapwa Ko Mahal Ko (GMA 7); Imee Marcos – At the Moment With Imee (All TV 2); Vicky Morales – Wish Ko Lang (GMA 7); Emil Sumangil – Resibo: Walang Lusot ang May Atraso (GMA 7); Raffy Tulfo – Kapatid Mo, Idol Raffy Tulfo (TV5); Sam Verzosa – Dear SV (GMA 7)
Best Documentary Program Host	Best Sports Show Host
**Atom Araullo, John Consulta, Kara David, Mav Gonzales and Howie Severino – i-Witness (GMA 7)**; Atom Araullo – The Atom Araullo Specials (GMA 7); Greg Gregorio – Cabinet @ Work (IBC 13); Maki Pulido and Jun Veneracion – Reporter's Notebook (GMA 7)	**Anton Roxas – The Scorecard (Bilyonaryo News Channel)**; Shiela Salaysay and Meg Siozon – PTV Sports (PTV 4)
Best Magazine Show Host	Best Lifestyle/Travel Show Host
**Marc Logan – Top 5: Mga Kwentong Marc Logan (TV5)**; Susan Enriquez and Empoy Marquez – IJuander (GTV 27); Vicky Morales – Good News (GTV 27); Korina Sanchez – Rated Korina (A2Z 11/TV5); Bernadette Sembrano – Tao Po! (A2Z 11); Jessica Soho – Kapuso Mo, Jessica Soho (GMA 7); Pinky Webb – Business Matters (GTV 27)	**Marie Lozano – The Lifestyle Lab (Bilyonaryo News Channel)**; Drew Arellano – Biyahe ni Drew (GTV 27); Niña Corpuz – Health @ Home (PTV 4); Reed Motovlog, Daniel Razon and Alfred Watermax – Manibela (UNTV 37); Matthew Pirante-Perez – ResTouRant (IBC 13); JR Royol – Farm to Table (GTV 27); Valerie Tan – I Heart PH (GTV 27)
Best Educational Program Host	Best Children Show Host
**Dingdong Dantes – Amazing Earth (GMA 7)**; Drew Arellano – Aha! (GMA 7); Elijah Canlas and Maymay Entrata – Puno ng Buhay (Knowledge Channel); Kara David – Pinas Sarap (GTV 27); Robi Domingo and Jewel Milag – MathDali (Knowledge Channel); Nielsen Donato and Ferds Recio – Born to Be Wild (GMA 7); Susan Enriquez – Pera Paraan (GMA 7); Robin Padilla – Unlad: Kaagapay sa Hanapbuhay (Net 25)	**Nicole Almeer, Candice Ayesha, Cara Bartolo, Anika Figueroa, Aljur Allan Perez and Yzabelle Luisa Perez – Talents Academy (IBC 13)**; Michelle Agas - Wikaharian (Knowledge Channel); Joseph Ancheta, Cholo Castillo, Elia Ilano and Yumi Sansano – Artsy Craftsy (PTV 4); Eric Cabobos, Liana Manalanzan, Elisha Manalanzan, Queenzy Villanueva, EK Navales, Kenchie Diaz, Julia Oyong, Merrielle Lagrimas, Boo Andres, Zyrus Juan, Jof Garcia, Roadblock Andres, Xyum Diaz, David Soriano, Zach Salomo, Clark Elias Carumba and Juliana De Leon – KNC Show (UNTV 37); Jaden Anunciacion, Edmont Boy, Charm del Castillo, Yanna Gonzales, Anjelo Jamorawon, Vem Lising and Ziahbelle Mazo – Little Juan's Playlist (INC TV 48)

== Special awards ==
=== Ading Fernando Lifetime Achievement Award ===
- Janice de Belen

=== Excellence in Broadcasting Lifetime Achievement Award ===
- Julius Babao

=== German Moreno Power Tandem Award ===
- Paulo Avelino and Kim Chiu
- David Licauco and Barbie Forteza

=== Posthumous Award as Icon of Philippine Television ===
- Gloria Romero

=== Hall of Fame Award ===
- i-Witness (GMA 7) (Best Documentary Program)

=== Stars of the Night ===
- Alden Richards (Male)
- Kim Chiu (Female)

=== Celebrities of the Night ===
- Dingdong Dantes (Male)
- Janine Gutierrez (Female)

=== Shining Stars of the Night ===
- Dingdong Dantes (Male)
- Julie Anne San Jose (Female)

=== Faces of the Night ===
- Coco Martin (Male)
- Barbie Forteza (Female)

=== Showbiz Pillar of the Night ===
- Janice de Belen

=== Philanthropist of the Year ===
- Virginia Rodriguez

== Most major nominations ==
Nominations by Network
Nominations	Network
115	GMA 7
72	A2Z 11
67	TV5
33	Net 25
27	All TV 2
23	GTV 27
14	PTV 4
12	Bilyonaryo News Channel
9	INC TV 48
8	IBC 13
7	Knowledge Channel
6	UNTV 37
3	RPTV 9
1	Aliw 23

== Most major wins ==
Wins by Network
Wins	Network
27	GMA 7
12	TV5
9	A2Z 11
6	Bilyonaryo News Channel
4	All TV 2
3	GTV 27
2	IBC 13
2	Net 25
1	RPTV 9
1	INC TV 48

== Ceremony information ==
In 2025, the Philippine Movie Press Club (PMPC) announced a major realignment of the Star Awards for Television ceremonies. This was in response to the growth of Digital television in the Philippines. Its selection process, which covered TV programs aired from January to December of a previous year overseen by the press. The winners of the mostly selected categories are revealed before the awarding ceremony. On the other hand, the winners are revealed on the videowall instead of the envelopes during the awarding ceremony.

== Performers ==
Name(s)	Performed
Julie Anne San Jose; Christian Bautista; Kai Montinola; Jarren Garcia	Boyband Medley: Like a Cannonball; I Want It That Way; Permission to Dance
Martin Nievera	Ikaw Lang Ang Mamahalin; Kahit Isang Saglit; Ikaw
Jed Madela; Singing Queens	Together in Electric Dreams; Mamma Mia; Believe

== See also ==
- PMPC Star Awards for TV
- 2024 in Philippine television
