= Prince Vaali =

- Directed by: Vishnu Tanay
- Screenplay by: Vishnu Tanay
- Story by: Vishnu Tanay
- Produced by: JHT
- Starring: Shiva Thejus; Daiana Menezes
- Production company: JHT
- Distributed by: JHT
- Release date: 25 April 2014
- Country: India
- Languages: English, Hindi, Spanish
- Budget: $140 million

Prince Vaali is a 2014 Hollywood superhero action film written by and directed by Vishnu Tanay.

Prince Vaali was released on 25 April 2014.

== Plot summary ==
A technologically advanced race from a far away constellation arrives on ancient Earth to gain supremacy. To maintain control over mother Earth, the twelve mighty tribes - Garuda, Gandharva, Yaksha, Kinnera, Kimpurusha, Naga, Vanara, Vidhyadhara, Valikilya, Deva, Pisacha and Rakshasa - ruling different parts of ancient Earth must unite under the leadership of the recluse and arrogant demi-god Vaali.

== Cast ==
- Shiva Thejus as Vaali
- Daiana Menezes

== Production ==
A super suit for the lead actor has been manufactured by Renegade Effects Group and is reportedly one of the most expensive suits in World Cinema. Top actors and actresses of Latin America have been hired to play important characters. Reputed Hollywood stunt choreographer James Lew is directing the action sequences of the film.
