= List of Net 25 original programming =

NET25 is a Philippine Free-to-air television network owned by Eagle Broadcasting Corporation (EBC), a private company under the Iglesia ni Cristo (INC). The following is a list of all television original programming by NET25 since it began its television operations on July 27, 1999.

== Current original programming ==
=== Newscast ===
- Mata ng Agila
  - Mata ng Agila International (2022)
  - Mata ng Agila Primetime (2011; simulcast on Radyo Agila)
  - Mata ng Agila sa Tanghali (2023; simulcast on Radyo Agila)
  - Mata ng Agila Weekend (2012)
- NET25 News Update (2022)

=== Current Affairs ===
- (A.S.P.N.) Ano sa Palagay N'yo? (2021; simulcast on Radyo Agila)
- Bakbakan Na! (2026)
- Resbak (2026)
- Responde: Mata ng Mamamayan (2011–2019, 2021)
- Sa Ganang Mamamayan (2013; simulcast on Radyo Agila)
- Siyento por Siyento (2023; simulcast on Radyo Agila)
- The Operator (2026)

=== Talk ===
- The Meow Meow Late Night Show with Kiko Barzaga (2026)

=== Variety ===
- Letters & Music (2012)

=== Comedy ===
- 3-in-1 (2024)
- GoodWill (2023)
- May For Ever (2024)
- Oh No! It's B.O. (Biro Only) (2022: re-run)
- Legally Funny (2026)
- Love Bosleng and Tali (2022: re-run)

=== Reality ===
- Road to Starkada (2023)

=== Game Show ===
- Tara Game, Agad Agad Level Up (2022: re-run)

=== Infotainment ===
- Art Academy (2023)
- Ito ang Tahanan (2021; simulcast on Radyo Agila)
- Kada Umaga (2021)
- Landmarks (2008)
- Love, Tonipet and Everythaaang! (2023)
- Lutong Daza (2022)
- Motorcycle Republic (2024)
- Open for Business (2020)

=== Asianovelas ===
- My Love, Madame Butterfly (2026)
- Wonderful Mama (2026)

=== Religious ===
All Iglesia ni Cristo programs are aired under the unofficial INC TV on Net 25 block.

- Ang Iglesia ni Cristo (1999–2004, 2008)
- Ang Pagbubunyag (2005)
- Artime (2016)
- Biblia Ang Sasagot (2018)
- Blueprint (2018)
- Christian Society for the Deaf (2018)
- Chronicles (2009)
- Daan ng Buhay (2021)
- Don't Give Up (2020)
- Executive News (2010)
- Gabay sa Mabuting Asal (1999–2003, 2012)
- Gourmade at Home (2021)
- #Hashtag (2013)
- Iglesia ni Cristo and the Bible (1999–2003, 2008)
- INCinema (2013)
- INC International Edition (2012)
- INC Kids Adventure (2022)
- Landas ng Buhay (2010)
- Lingap sa Mamamayan (2012)
- Little Juan's Playlist (2020)
- Musiko (2019)
- New Normal (2021)
- Negosyuniversity (2021)
- Paninindigan (2014)
- Pasugo (1999–2004, 2010)
- Pundasyon (2014)
- Reconnect (2018)
- Resonate (2017)
- See For Yourself (2024)
- That's In the Bible (2012–2020, 2024)
- The Great Mouse Detective (2024)
- Time to Draw Live (2018)
- Trabaho Ko To (2013–2016, 2018–2019, 2020)
- Turning Point (2021)
- Your Light Forever (2020)

== Former original programming ==
Note: Titles are listed in alphabetical order, followed by the year of debut in parentheses.

=== Newscasts ===
- 1062 kHz Balita Update (2002–2007)
- Agila Balita (2013–2020)
- Agila Pilipinas (2019–2021)
- Agila Probinsiya (2014–2021)
- Agila Reports (2003–2005)
- ASEAN in Focus (2014–2022)
- Balitalakayan (2021–2022)
- Chinese News TV (CNTV) (2017–2019; produced by the Horizon of the Sun Communications)
- DW-TV Journal (2003–2015)
- DW News (2015, 2019–2022)
- Eagle News Evening Edition (2011–2013)
- Eagle News International (2013–2022)
  - Eagle News International Filipino Edition (2018–2021)
- Eagle News Morning Edition (2011–2013)
- Eagle News Update (2011–2022)
- Eagle News Weekend Edition (2011–2012)
- i-Balita (2007–2011)
  - i-Balita Online (2011–2013)
  - i-Balita Update (2010–2011)
  - i-Balita Weekend Report (2011)
- i-News (2008–2011)
- Masayang Umaga Po! (2015–2017)
- Net 25 Report (2001–2008)
- Net 25 World News (Mata ng Agila World News) (2024–2025)
- Newsbeat (2004–2007)
- Openline (2003–2007)
- Pambansang Almusal (2011–2021)
- Planet 25 Report (2000–2001)
- UltraVision 25 Report (1999–2000)
- World Report (2001–2008)
  - World Report Early Edition (2001–2003)
  - World Report Filipino Edition (2001–2004)

=== Current Affairs ===
- Aprub (2011–2019)
- Captured (2003–2005)
- Con Todos Recados (2001–2005)
- Counterpoint with Atty. Salvador Panelo (2022–2024)
- Diskusyon (2014–2019)
- Exclusive (2012)
- Focus AEC: ASEAN Economy Community (2013–2014)
- Gabay sa Kalusugan (2005–2008)
- Home Page (2008–2013)
- In Case of Emergency (2016)
- Kapatid sa Hanapbuhay (2005–2008)
- Klima ng Pagbabago (2014–2019)
- Liwanagin Natin (2001–2007)
- Patakaran kasama si Atty. Tranquil Salvador III (2014–2019)
- Piskante ng Bayan (2013–2021)
- Responde: Tugon Aksyon Ngayon (2011–2019)

=== Lifestyle and entertainment ===
- 5 Girls and a Dad (2012)
- Ang Daigdig Ko'y Ikaw (2020)
- ArTalk: Beyond Entertainment (2012–2013)
- Arts.21 (2003–2011)
- Barangay Mirandas (2023)
- Beautiful Sunday (2017–2018)
- Bee Happy Go Lucky (2018)
- Camera Geek TV (2011–2012)
- Chinatown TV (2017–2019)
- ChiNoy Star Ka Na! (2013–2014)
- Chinoy TV (2010–2014)
- Class7 Civil Servant (2014)
- Cucina ni Nadia (2021–2022)
- Destination Philippines (2012)
- Discover Germany (2008–2011)
- Donny & Marie (2002–2006)
- Eat's Singing Time (2021)
- Euromaxx (2003–2011)
- Fil-Am Jams (2013–2014)
- Footprints (2010–2012)
- Funniest Snackable Videos (2021–2022)
- Gabay at Aksyon (2017–2018)
- Galing ng Pinoy (2018)
- Global 3000 (2008–2022)
- Happy Time (2020–2021)
- Himig ng Lahi (2020-2022)
- Home Grown (2002–2004)
- House Calls (2002–2006)
- I, Mee and U (2018–2019)
- Ikaw ay Akin (2021)
- In Good Shape (2008–2015)
- Kesayasaya (2020–2021)
- Korina Interviews (2022–2023)
- Let's Get Ready to TVRadyo (2021–2022)
- Magandang ARAw (2023-2025)
- MTRCB Uncut (2015–2016)
- Noli Me Tangere (2002–2003)
- On-Set: The World Class Filipino Artist (2009–2012)
- Our House (2001–2004)
- Panalo o Talo, It's You (2022)
- Pelikwentuhan (2020–2021)
- PEP News (2014–2019)
- Pilot Guides (1999–2003)
- Play Music Videos (2001–2005)
- Red Carpet (2009–2012)
- RYTS: Rule Yourself to Success (2018)
- Sessions on 25th Street (2011–2018)
- Sessions Presents (2012–2013)
- Spoon (2007–2015)
- Tagisan ng Galing (2019–2021)
- Tara! Ating Pasyalan (2021–2022)
- Tara Game, Agad Agad! (2021–2022)
- Taumbahay (2012–2019)
- Tol ng Bayan with Francis Tolentino (2018–2019)
- The Fitness Couple (2013)
- The Janice Hung Show (2015)
- The Planet (2004–2006)
- The Prodigal Prince (2018)
- Tribe (2006–2013, 2014–2019)
- Urban Peasant (2003–2005)

=== Kid-oriented ===
- Between the Lions (2002–2005)
- Homework (2015–2019)
- Li'l Elvis and the Truckstoppers (2002–2006)
- Lil' Horrors (2002–2004)
- Math Magaling (2015)
- Oakie Doke (2001–2005)
- Philbert Frog (2000–2006)
- Popular Mechanics for Kids (1999–2003)
- The Country Mouse and the City Mouse Adventures (1999–2006)
- The New Yankee Workshop (2001–2003)
- Ultraman Cosmos (2003-2004)
- Wheel 2000 (2001–2004)
- Word Hub (2016–2017, rerun, 2025–2026)
- Zoboomafoo (2000–2002)

=== Religious (Iglesia ni Cristo) ===
- Ang Mga Nagsialis sa Samahang Ang Dating Daan (2006–2007)
- Dati'y Nasa Sumpa, Ngayon'y Nasa Tama (2004–2006)
- Ilaw ng Kaligtasan (2004–2007)
- Iglesia ni Cristo Chronicles (2004–2009)
- Investigated: False (2012–2013)
- Ito ang Payo (2003–2006)
- Light of Salvation (2008–2012)
- My Life (2012–2013)
- Pananampalataya, Pag-asa at Pag-ibig (2010–2012)
- Truth Uncovered (2012–2013)

=== Technology ===
- Audio File (2000–2004)
- Auto, Motor & Sport (2003–2006)
- Beyond 2000 (2000–2004)
- Call for Help (2000–2004)
- Car Guys (1999–2003)
- Computer Chronicles (2001–2003)
- Convergence (2000–2016)
- Cyberdoodoo (2003–2004)
- Extended Play (2000–2003)
- Fresh Gear (2001–2005)
- NET Café (2001–2004)
- Next Step (2002–2004)
- Rev (2020–2022)
- The Screen Savers (2001–2005)
- Tomorrow Today (2003–2022)
- www.com (2001–2004)
- ZDTV News (2000–2003)
- Zip File (2000–2004)

=== Sports ===
- Bundesliga Kick Off! (2003–2018)
- Filsports Basketball Association (2015–2016)
- PBA Classics (1999–2000)
- NAASCU Basketball (2011–2012)

=== Informercials ===
- EZ Shop Asia (2015–2018, 2022)

=== Asianovelas ===
- A Date with the Future (2025)
- A Place in the Sun (2022–2023)
- As Beautiful as You (2026)
- Best Choice Ever (2025)
- Fatal Promise (2022–2023)
- Flower I Am (2014)
- Go Go Squid! (2025)
- Gracious Revenge (2024)
- Happy Ending (2025)
- Hello, My Shining Love (2024, re-run, 2025)
- Here We Meet Again (2025)
- Hi Venus (2026)
- House of Bluebird (2023–2024)
- Kimchi Family (2025, re-run, 2026)
- Love Designer (2024–2025)
- Love Me, Love My Voice (2024–2025, re-run, 2025–2026)
- Meet Yourself (2026)
- My Bargain Queen (2023–2024)
- Mysterious Personal Shopper (2023)
- Never Twice (2022)
- Rising With the Wind (2025, re-run, 2026)
- Oath of Love (2024)
- Strict ang Mommy Ko (2024)
- Syndrome (2025)
- The Snow Queen (2013; re-run: 2014)
- Unwanted Family (2023–2024)
- You Are My Hero (2026)

=== Telenovelas ===
- Kızım (2023)
- Mi Esperanza (2022)
- One Litre of Tears (2024)
- Palabra de Amor (2022)

=== Net 25 specials ===
- 28th Asian Television Awards Live Show (January 13, 2024)
- Eagle Bayan Care-A-Van: The Net 25 Special Coverage (August 6, 2011)
- Gintong Pangarap: Kapisanang Buklod 50th Anniversary Musicale (November 2012)
- Kabayan Ko, Kapatid Ko: Net 25 and INCTV Special Coverage (2013–ongoing)
- The Nation Decides 2010: Net 25 Election Coverage (May 10–11, 2010)
- Pambansang Desisyon, Halalan 2013: Net 25 Election Coverage (May 13–14, 2013)
- Desisyon ng Bayan 2016: Net 25 Election Coverage (May 9–10, 2016)
- Desisyon ng Bayan 2019: Net 25 Election Coverage (May 13–14, 2019)
- Mata ng Halalan 2022: Net 25 Election Coverage (May 9–10, 2022)
- Mata ng Halalan 2025: Net 25 Election Coverage (May 12–13, 2025)
  - Mata ng Halalan: The Net 25 Election Coverage (2022–ongoing)
  - Mata ng Halalan 2025 News Updates (May 12 & 13, 2025)
- Lea Salonga... Your Songs (January 23 & 24, 2010)
- Eduardo Manalo: Dalawang Taon ng Pamamahala (September 7–11, 2011)
- INC Worldwide Walk For Those Affected by Typhoon Yolanda Special Coverage (February 15, 2014, together with INC TV)
- Lingap sa Mamamayan: Barrio Maligaya Resettlement Site 49th Anniversary Special Coverage (February 22, 2014, together with INC TV)
- INCinema Excellence in Visual Media Awards (November 17, 2013)
- This is Kadiwa: GEMTV Special Coverage (December 23–25, 2010)
- Mahal na Mahal Namin Kayo, Ka Erdy: The GEMNET/Net 25 Special Coverage (September 1–7, 2009)
- Martha Stewart's Secrets for Entertaining (November 13–16, 2001; re-runs, 2002–2006, 2007–2008)
- PMPC Star Awards for Movies
- PMPC Star Awards for Music
- PMPC Star Awards for Television
- One Plus One Equals Hapinas: Mas Masaya kung May Kasama concert special (July 7, 2013)
- Pinas FM 955: Fun-Bansang Selebrasyon (June 16 and 17, 2012)
- INC Worldwide Walk to Fight Poverty (May 5–7, 2018, in partnership with INCTV)
- Panata Sa Bayan 2022: The KBP Presidential Candidates Forum (February 4, 2022)
- Worldwide Lingap 2023 (October 31, 2023)
- Sigaw Kontra Korapsyon: A NET25 Special Coverage (September 21, 2025)

== See also ==
- List of Philippine television shows
