= Newsbeat (Philippine TV program) =

- Created by: Net 25
- Developed by: Net 25
- Starring: Arlene dela Cruz-Collantes; Onin Miranda; Ka Totoy Talastas; Various contributors
- Narrated by: Arlene dela Cruz-Collantes; Onin Miranda
- Country of origin: Philippines
- No. of episodes: n/a (airs daily)

Production
- Camera setup: multicamera setup
- Running time: 1 hour

Original release
- Network: Net 25
- Release: October 11, 2004 – August 10, 2007

Newsbeat is a Philippine television news broadcasting show broadcast by Net 25. Anchored by Arlene dela Cruz-Collantes, Onin Miranda and Totoy Talastas. It aired from October 11, 2004 to August 10, 2007, replacing World Report Filipino Edition and was replaced by i-Balita. The slogan is "Ang bagong pulso ng mga balita" which translates to "The new pulse of the news" in English. A 60-minute newscast, was aired at 6:00 PM Philippine time.

Veteran broadcaster Ka Totoy Talastas joins the duo in providing commentary on the day's current affairs.

== See also ==
- List of Net 25 original programming
