= I Heart You, Pare! =

2011 Philippine television drama series

- Title card
- Also known as: I ♥ You, Bro
- I ♥ You, Pare!
- Genre: Drama; Romantic comedy
- Written by: Denoy Navarro-Punio; Maribes Severano; Lean Sales; Juan Kenneth de Leon
- Directed by: Andoy Ranay; Joyce E. Bernal
- Creative director: Jun Lana
- Starring: Regine Velasquez; Iza Calzado; Dingdong Dantes
- Theme music composer: Janno Gibbs
- Opening theme: "This Guy is in Love with You Pare" by Dingdong Dantes and Regine Velasquez
- Ending theme: "True Romance" by Regine Velasquez
- Country of origin: Philippines
- Original language: Tagalog
- No. of episodes: 78

Production
- Executive producer: Joseph B. Buncalan
- Production locations: Marikina; Quezon City
- Camera setup: Multiple-camera setup
- Running time: 17–37 minutes
- Production company: GMA Entertainment TV

Original release
- Network: GMA Network
- Release: February 7 – May 27, 2011

I ♥ You, Pare! (read as I Heart You, Pare! / transl. I heart you, man! / international title: I ♥ You, Bro) is a 2011 Philippine television drama romantic comedy series broadcast by GMA Network. Directed by Andoy Ranay and Joyce E. Bernal, it stars Regine Velasquez, Iza Calzado and Dingdong Dantes. It premiered on February 7, 2011, on the network's Telebabad line up. The series concluded on May 27, 2011, with a total of 78 episodes.

The series is streaming online on YouTube.

== Cast and characters ==
Cast

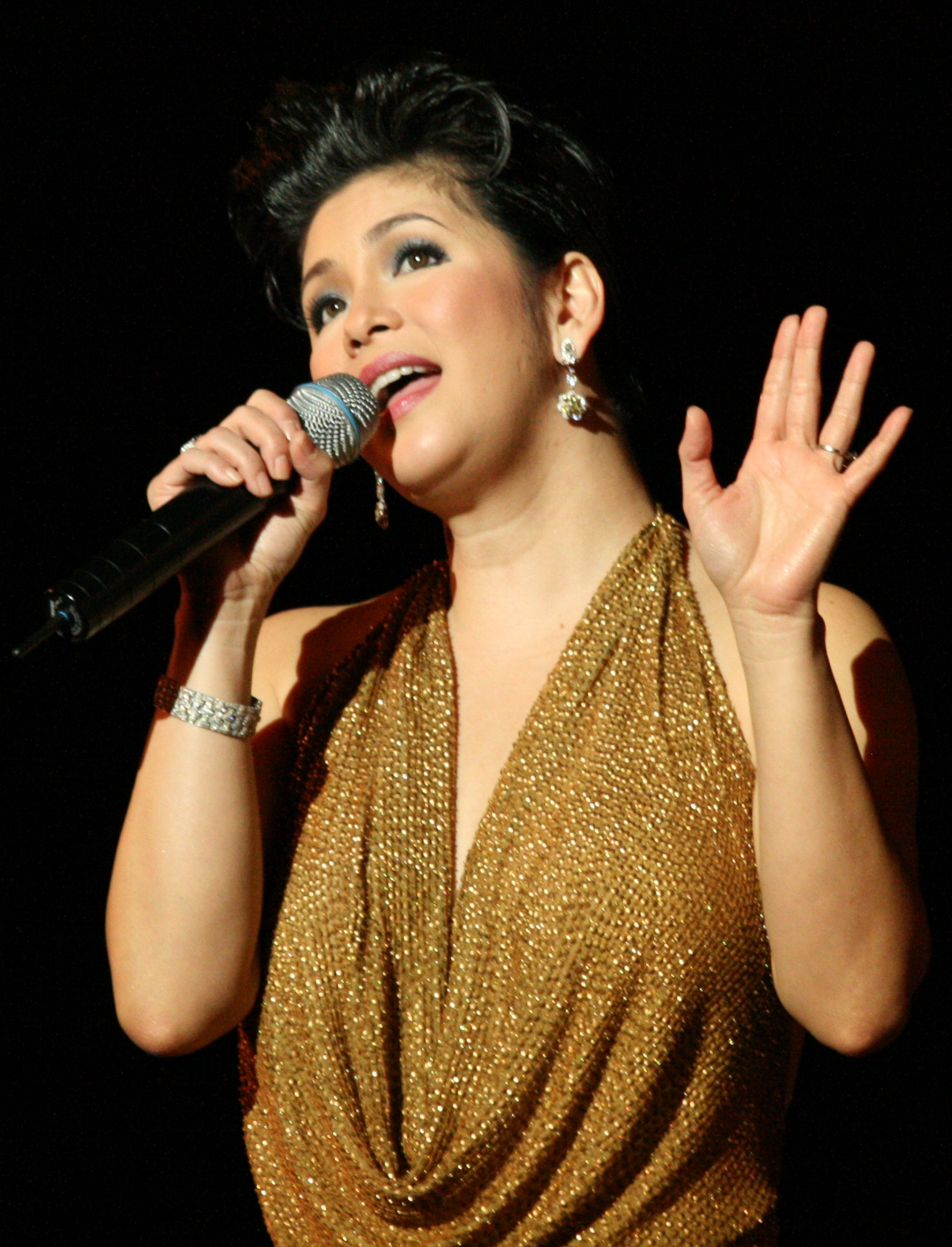
Regine Velasquez

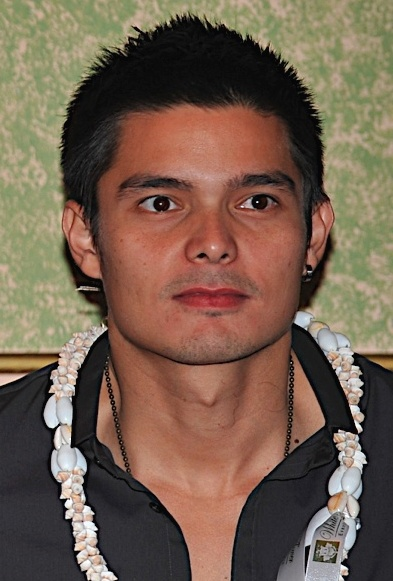
Dingdong Dantes

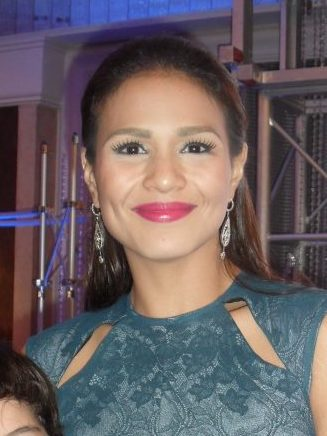
Iza Calzado

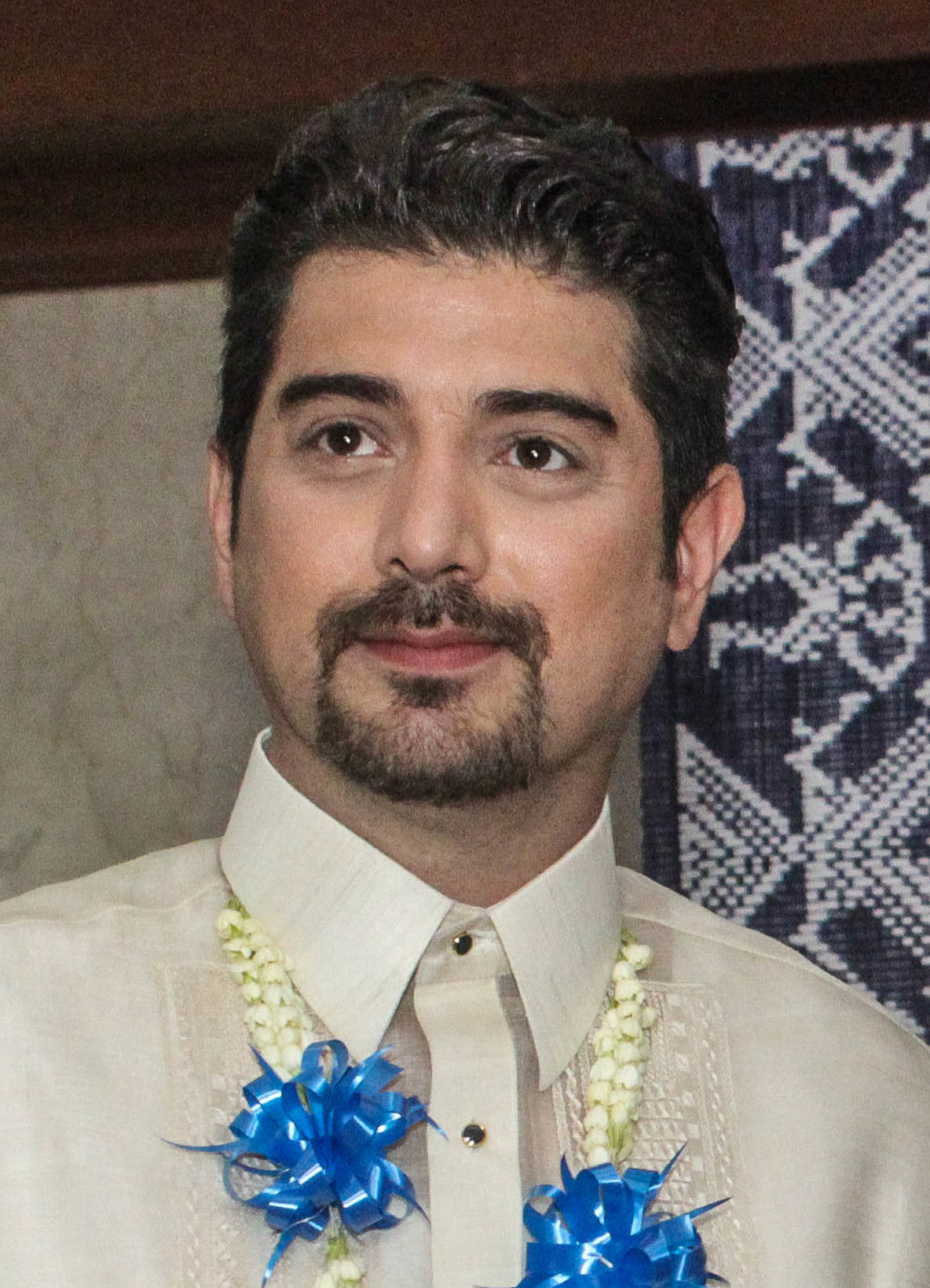
Ian Veneracion

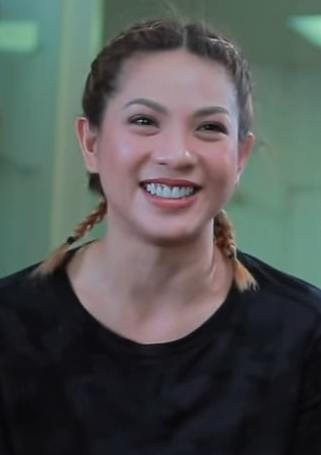
Luane Dy

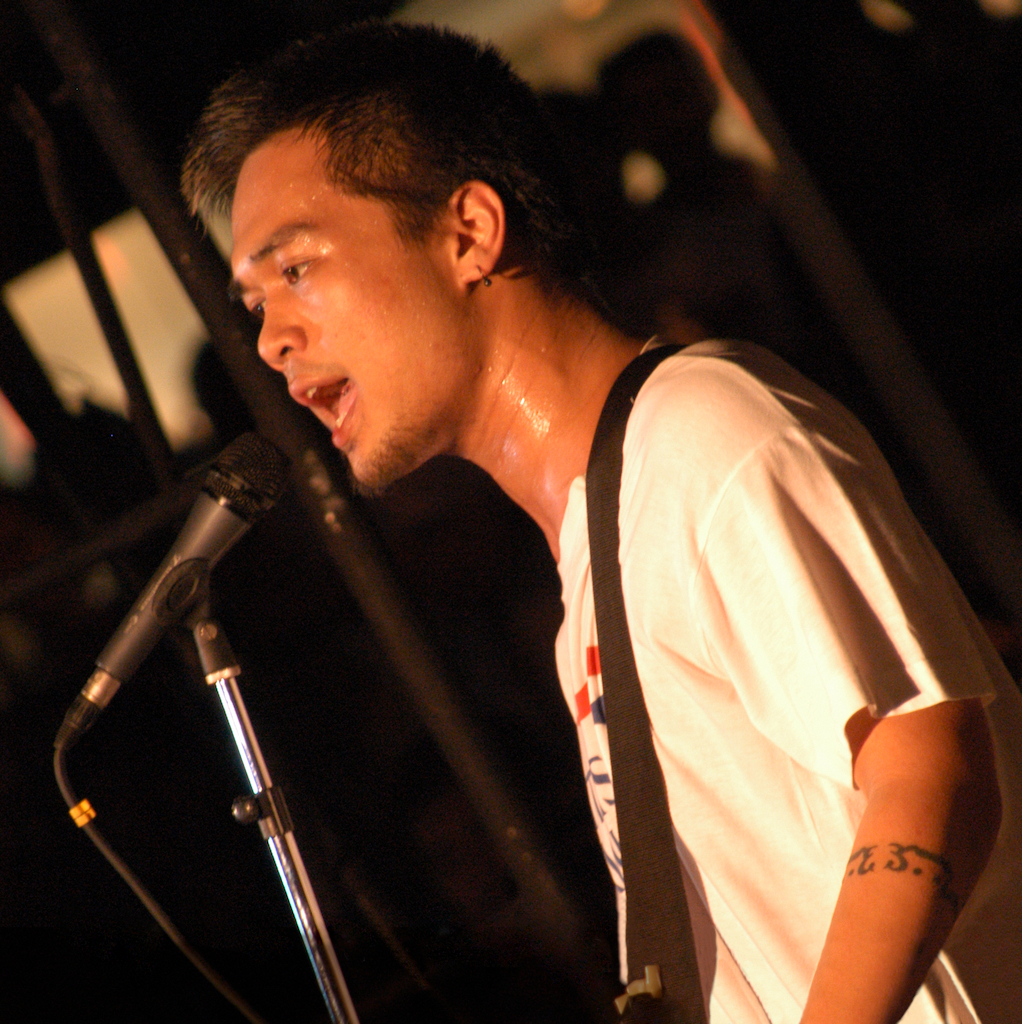
Marc Abaya

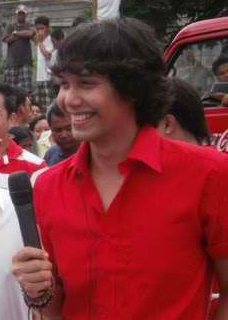
Paolo Ballesteros

Lead cast

- Regine Velasquez and Iza Calzado as Antonia "Tonya" Estrella / Tonette
- Dingdong Dantes as Kenneth Castillo

Supporting cast

- Tirso Cruz III as Cesar / Sarsi
- Ian Veneracion as Ramon Castillo
- Celia Rodriguez as Marita Castillo
- Luane Dy as Nikki Romualdez
- Ehra Madrigal as Mandy
- Paolo Ballesteros as Vodka
- Via Antonio as Polly
- Joel Camacho as Pepsi
- Boy Alano as Coka
- Joey Paras as Serbeza
- Peter Serrano as Vi
- Marc Abaya as Joel
- Antonio Aquitania as Sonny Boy
- Carlo Gonzales as Caloy
- Kevin Santos as Joni
- Butz Aquino as Henry Castillo
- Racquel Villavicencio as Corazon Romualdez
- Luz Valdez as Charito Castillo

Guest cast

- Ryza Cenon as Mia Valencia
- Stella Cañete as a doctor
- Tom Olivar as Costales
- Chinggoy Alonzo as Carlos Romualdez
- Arthur Solinap as Chong
- Mark Anthony Fernandez as Chito Salazar

== Casting ==
In April 2011, Philippine actress Iza Calzado replaced singer-actress Regine Velasquez in the series as Tonette, due to Velasquez's pregnancy.

== Production ==
Principal photography commenced on November 9, 2010. Filming took place in Marikina and Quezon City. Filming concluded in May 2011.

== Ratings ==
According to AGB Nielsen Philippines' Mega Manila People/Individual television ratings, the pilot episode of I Heart You, Pare! earned an 11.4% rating. The final episode scored a 22.9% rating in Mega Manila household television ratings.
