= Rikki Mathay =

Filipino journalist

- Occupations: Multi Media Journalist Media and Public Relations Specialist Philanthropist

Rikki Mathay is a multi-awarded broadcast journalist from the Philippines before becoming a Spokesperson and Media Chief in the Senate of the Philippines (2013 to 2018).

== Career ==
Mathay was the youngest news anchor in Philippine broadcast history at 19, when she began her career at ABS-CBN Broadcasting Corporation straight out of college. Among her most noteworthy news and current affairs programs in ABS-CBN include the following:

=== Alas Singko Y Medya (ASYM) ===
A 3-hour daily morning show where she was introduced as VJ Rikki in 2000. A spin-off of ASYM, Mathay hosted Magandang Umaga, Bayan, as one of the show’s main hosts until 2005.

=== The CNN Global News with Rikki Kwek ===
Through a partnership with the international news agency CNN, Mathay was the anchor for this nightly global newscast. She broke the news on the 9/11 Tragedy, among other international headliners.

=== The Filipino Channel's Balitang Middle East ===
The flagship program of the first international News Bureau in the Philippines, Mathay pioneered Balitang Middle East as its host and anchor.

=== ABS-CBN Breaking News/ Hourly News Advisory ===
Over 7 days of hourly news updates from morning until evening, Mathay broke the latest news, including the Manila Peninsula military standoff and a bombing, among others.

=== Meron Akong Kwento ===
Partnering with Marc Logan in 2003, Mathay produced and anchored national human interest stories under ABS-CBN’s current affairs department.

=== Headlines Nightly News ===
The nightly newscast before Bandila, Mathay anchored the lifestyle and showbiz portions of the program, being a first in evening news programs at that time.

=== News Advisories for FM Station WRR 101.9...For Life ===
Writer, researcher, and anchor, Mathay headed the news division of ABS-CBN's FM station, WRR 101.9... For Life, from 1999 to 2003. The station was dubbed the number 1 FM station according to surveys during that time. ^

=== DZMM 630 SSS Reports ===
Mathay's programs were top-rated during her stay, including the FM station of ABS-CBN, which ranked the highest in surveys. ^

During her broadcasting career, Mathay was not only a famous news anchor, and a sought-after events host, but she also served as a young director for Media in the National Commission on the Role of Filipino Women (NCRFW) under then chairman Myrna Yao.

After her marriage in 2005, Mathay committed herself to motherhood and philanthropy. In 2012, Mathay joined the office of then neophyte Senator JV Ejercito as his Media Chief and Spokesperson in the Senate of the Philippines.

=== Print Media ===
Mathay is currently a columnist for leading national newspapers, Manila Bulletin, with her weekly editorial The Right Move, and Bulgar Tabloid.

=== Eagle Broadcasting Corporation ===
In December 13, 2022, Mathay joined NET25 as its news anchor for Mata ng Agila, as well as its news and public relations consultant.

== Personal life ==
Mathay was born Ingrid Baclig Kwek to businessman Nick Kwek and Lilian Baclig-Kwek (of the political clan of Cagayan). Rikki, as she was later known in broadcasting, is an alumna of St. Theresa's College, Quezon City, where she was a consistent Outstanding Student. At age 16, she was a freshman at the University of the Philippines, Diliman and graduated Magna Cum Laude at age 19 with a double degree in BA- Broadcast Communication and BA- Sociology. She was inducted into the prestigious honor societies, International Honor Society of Pi Kappa Phi and the Pi Gamma Mu International Honour Society of Social Sciences.

Her school internship with broadcast journalist Gel Santos-Relos for ABS-CBN's travel program, Tatak Pinoy, paved the way to her career with the network.

In 2005, she married Cris Mathay ^ and they have two daughters, Cristah and Mischka.

== Philanthropies ==
Mathay was one of the earlier volunteers of the Philippine Red Cross in Barangay Greenhills, San Juan. In 2010, she organized this upscale community to train the first internationally accredited volunteers of the Red Cross in Greenhills. She continues to serve as a Director of the Philippine Red Cross.

She has also been active in other non-government organizations that support the marginalized. Mathay has been a board member of Zonta Club International, National Director of the Junior Chamber International (JCI) Philippines, the Parents Auxiliary of the Immaculate Conception Academy, and a supporter of the Tzu Chi Foundation. A devout Catholic and a Marian devotee, she and her husband served as Cabeza de Barangay of St. John de Baptist parish. Rikki was also a spokesperson for the national movement of breastfeeding advocates, Latch.

In 2002, she served as Director in the National Commission on the Role of Filipino Women, championing and protecting women's rights, which has been her advocacy along with championing health care.

Mathay is a blogger on the lifestyle website, workingmommah.weebly.com.
