= Pambansang Almusal =

Philippine television show

- Genre: News broadcasting; Talk show
- Presented by: Phoebe Publico; Kristel Fesalbon; Wej Cudiamat; Apple David
- Theme music composer: Ernie Magtuto
- Country of origin: Philippines
- Original language: Tagalog

Production
- Production locations: EBC Bldg., #25 Central Avenue, New Era, Quezon City, Metro Manila, Philippines
- Camera setup: Single-camera setup
- Running time: 120 minutes

Original release
- Network: NET25
- Release: October 24, 2011 – August 27, 2021

Pambansang Almusal (transl. National Breakfast) is a Philippine television news broadcasting and talk show broadcast by NET25. Originally hosted by Mavic Trinidad, Gen Subardiaga and Eden Suarez-Santos, it premiered on October 24, 2011 on the network's morning line up. Phoebe Publico, Kristel Fesalbon, Wej Cudiamat, and Apple David will serve as the final hosts. The show concluded on August 27, 2021. It was replaced by Kada Umaga in its timeslot.

== Final hosts ==
- Phoebe Publico (2017–21)
- Kristel Fesalbon (2019–21)
- Wej Cudiamat (2020–21)
- Apple David (2020–21)

== Former hosts ==
- Mavic Trinidad
- Eden Suarez-Santos
- Gen Subardiaga
- Pia Okut
- Gel Miranda
- Onin Miranda
- Davey Langit
- Aikee
- Apple Chiu
- Regine Angeles
- Richard Quan
- Carmela Magtuto-Navarro
- Kath Magtuto-Mangahas
- Bobby Crisostomo
- Tristan Bayani
- Nathan Manzo
- Chadleen Lacdo-o
- MJ Racadio
- Nikki Facal
- Nikki Veron-Cruz
- Kyle Nofuente
- Nicole Ching
- Leo Martinez
- Andrea Bardos
- Ben Bernaldez
- Liza Flores
- Mia Suarez
- Claire Cuenca
- Julie Fernando
- Cess Alvarez
- Ken Mesina
- Earlo Bringas
- Genesis Gomez
- Marie Ochoa
- Andrea Mendres
- Aily Millo
- CJ Panulaya
- Jam Talaña
- Genive Tuban
- Edward Flores
- Gerald Rañez
- Aaron Dy
- Mikki Sachico
- Mondi Lopez
- Anatha Eniego

== See also ==
- List of NET25 original programming
