= Luane Dy =

Filipino actress, model and host (born 1986)

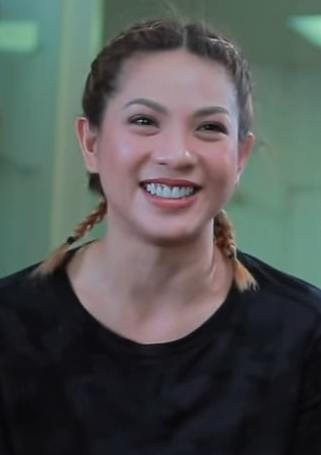
- Dy in 2018
- Born: Luzia Jannie Estrella Dy; January 25, 1986 (age 40); Cauayan, Isabela, Philippines
- Other name: Madeleine Lauren Dy
- Occupations: News anchor; hostactress; model
- Agents: APT Entertainment (2017–2020); Sparkle (2021–2026); NET25 (2026–present)
- Television: Unang Hirit; 24 Oras Weekend; Balitanghali; Eat Bulaga!
- Spouse: Carlo Gonzales (m. 2019)
- Children: 2
- Relatives: Bojie Dy (uncle); Inno Dy (cousin); Ian Paul Dy (cousin); Mike Dy III (cousin)

Luzia Jannie Estrella Dy-Gonzales (Tagalog pronunciation: [dɪ ɡɔnˈsalɛs]; born January 25, 1986), widely known as Luane Dy and Luane G., is a Filipino showbiz television personality, model and actress. She is known for being the host of GMA Network's morning television show Unang Hirit where she, along with her co-hosts, received the Best Morning Show Hosts award during the 29th PMPC Star Awards for Television in 2015. She also presents showbiz news on Balitanghali and used to anchor the entertainment news segment Chika Minute on 24 Oras Weekend.

As an actress, she appeared in the ABS-CBN television series The Wedding and Precious Hearts Romances Presents: Somewhere In My Heart. On GMA Network, she starred in I Heart You, Pare! as the girlfriend of Dingdong Dantes and in Genesis.

== Early life ==
Dy was born in Cauayan, Isabela from a Filipino-Spanish and Chinese ancestry. Her father, William Dy, is pure Chinese and cousin of Filipino politician Ian Paul Dy from the prominent political clan of Isabela while her mother, Thelma Rivera Estrella-Dy, is half-Filipino and half-Spanish. She has two other siblings, an older brother and a younger sister. When she was 14 years old, she along with her mother and her siblings left Isabela and relocated to Quezon City after her parents separated.

== Career ==
At 14 years old, Dy started as a model through joining a model search contest. She also appeared in commercials for various food brands before becoming well known. During her second year as an accountancy student at Far Eastern University, she became an actress and starred in various shows in ABS-CBN. In 2007, she became the entertainment segment presenter of GMA Network's 24 Oras and in 2010, she joined Unang Hirit as one of the hosts. Dy replaced Grace Lee as an anchor of segment "Star Bites" in Balitanghali, after Lee moved to TV5 In 2012.

In 2017, she became a regular host of Eat Bulaga! The management of Eat Bulaga! has been trying to get her as host in the past but it was not possible due to conflict of schedule, since Balitanghali airs on the same time slot as Eat Bulaga!. After guesting in "Jackpot En Poy" segment of Eat Bulaga!, the management offered her to be a host of Eat Bulaga! and she accepted it. Besides being a host for Eat Bulaga!, she starred on My Carinderia Girl, one of the six 2018 Lenten special of the Eat Bulaga!. She was also part of a web series documenting her temporary off-camera work as location manager for the "Juan for All, All for Juan" segment of Eat Bulaga!.

And in 2026, after almost 20 years, Dy left GMA Network and transferred to NET25, serving as one of the hosts of Kada Umaga and an anchor for Mata ng Agila Weekend.

== Personal life ==
Dy was the former girlfriend of former news reporter Mark Zambrano. In 2010, Dy dated actor Carlo Gonzales, to whom she got engaged by 2019 and got married in November of the same year. They have a son born in May 2020 named Jose Christiano and nicknamed Christ.

== Filmography ==
=== Film ===
- Jack Em Popoy: The Puliscredibles (2018) as Ms. Diane "Anne" Dela Paz - Suarez (Montenegro's family drug dealer No. 6 and a corrupt host and police protector)

=== Television ===
Year	Title	Role	Notes
2004–2005	Chowtime Na!	Herself	Host
2010–2025	24 Oras	Herself	"Chika Minute" news anchor
2009	The Wedding	Vivien	
2009	Precious Hearts Romances Presents: Somewhere In My Heart	Andrea Cusi	Protagonist
2010–2021	Unang Hirit	Herself	Main host, showbiz news presenter
2011	I Heart You, Pare!	Nikki Romualdez	
2012–2017	Balitanghali	Herself	"Star Bites" news anchor
2013	Genesis	Jill Galvez	
2017–2019	Eat Bulaga!	Herself	Host
2018	Eat Bulaga! Lenten Special: My Carinderia Girl	Eloisa	Main antagonist
2021	All-Out Sundays	Herself	Guest host for Shopee sale events
2026	Eat Bulaga! Lenten Special: Bahay Aruga	Evelyn	
2026	Kada Umaga	Herself	one of the main hosts
2026	Mata ng Agila Weekend	Herself	serves one of the main anchors
