= Farm to Table =

2021 Philippine television cooking show

- Title card since 2026
- Genre: Cooking show
- Presented by: JR Royol
- Country of origin: Philippines
- Original language: Tagalog

Production
- Camera setup: Multiple-camera setup
- Running time: 45 minutes
- Production company: GMA Entertainment Group

Original release
- Network: GMA News TV (2021); GTV (since 2021)
- Release: February 21, 2021 – present

Farm to Table is a Philippine television cooking show broadcast by GMA News TV and GTV. Hosted by JR Royol, it premiered on February 21, 2021 on GMA News TV's Sunday evening line up. In February 2021, GMA News TV was rebranded as GTV, with the show being carried over.

== Premise ==
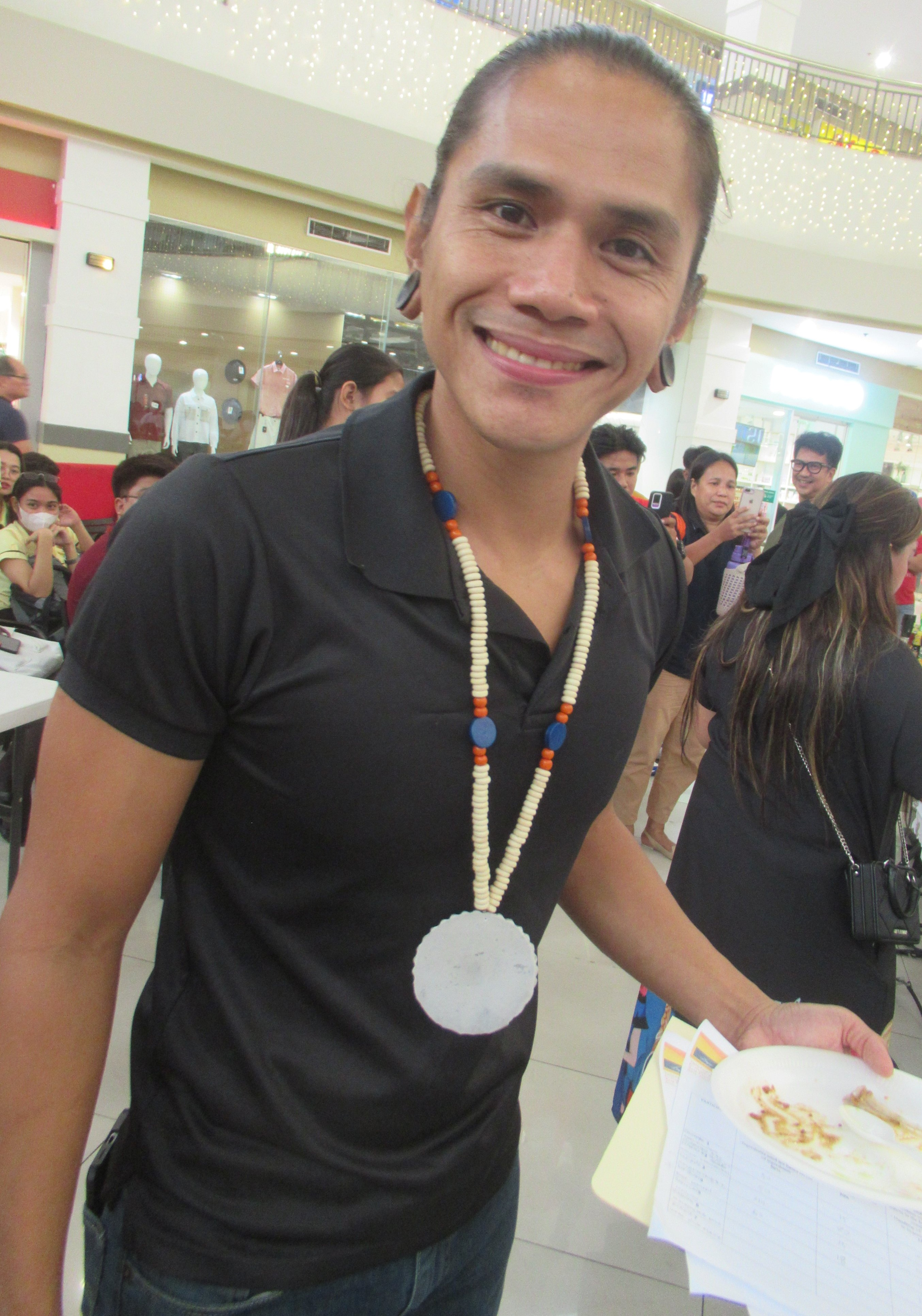
JR Royol serves as the host.

The show showcases the food preparation, from growing and harvesting the fresh produce, to cooking and plating the dishes. It also aims to show how to grow your own food and promote the planting culture among the Filipinos.

== Accolades ==
Accolades received by Farm to Table
Year	Awards	Category	Recipient	Result	Ref.
2023	35th PMPC Star Awards for Television	Best Educational Program	Farm to Table	Nominated	
2023	35th PMPC Star Awards for Television	Best Educational Program Host	JR Royol	Nominated	
2025	37th PMPC Star Awards for Television	Best Lifestyle/Travel Show	Farm to Table	Nominated	
2025	37th PMPC Star Awards for Television	Best Lifestyle/Travel Show Host	JR Royol John Feir	Nominated	
2025	38th PMPC Star Awards for Television	Best Lifestyle Travel Show	Farm to Table	Pending	
2025	38th PMPC Star Awards for Television	Best Lifestyle Travel Show Host	JR Royol	Pending	
