= My Mother, My Story =

Philippine television talk show

- Title card
- Genre: Talk show
- Written by: Yani Bautista; Bam Salvani; Ardee Delola
- Directed by: Rommel Gacho
- Presented by: Boy Abunda
- Country of origin: Philippines
- Original language: Tagalog
- No. of episodes: 6

Production
- Executive producer: Reylie Manalo
- Camera setup: Multiple-camera setup
- Running time: 36–54 minutes
- Production company: GMA Entertainment Group

Original release
- Network: GMA Network
- Release: May 12 – October 27, 2024

My Mother, My Story is a 2024 Philippine television talk show broadcast by GMA Network. Directed by Rommel Gacho, it is hosted by Boy Abunda. It premiered on May 12, 2024, on the network's Sunday Grande sa Hapon line up. It concluded on October 27, 2024, with a total of six episodes.

The show is streaming online on YouTube.

== Premise ==
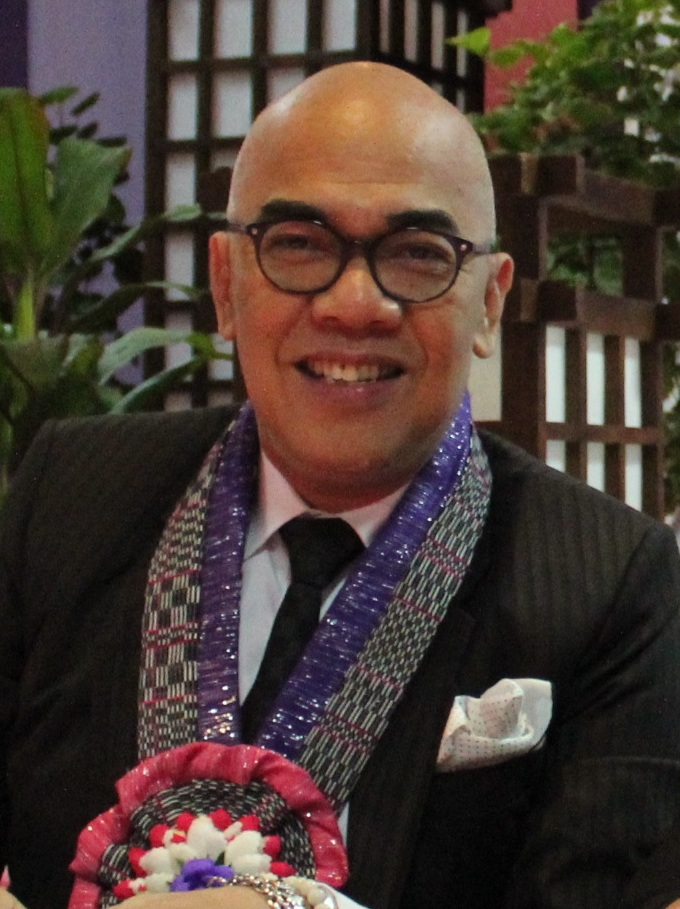
Boy Abunda serves as the host.

The program delves into the profound impact mothers have on the lives and careers of Philippine celebrities. Hosted by Boy Abunda, it aims to explore the influence of their mothers.

== Episodes ==
My Mother, My Story episodes
No.	Title	Original release date
1	"Luis Manzano's Mother"	May 12, 2024
2	"Andi Eigenmann's Mother"	June 9, 2024
3	"Jillian Ward's Mother"	July 21, 2024
4	"Bea Alonzo's Mother"	August 11, 2024
5	"EJ Obiena's Mother"	September 29, 2024
6	"Ai-Ai delas Alas's Mother"	October 27, 2024

== Ratings ==
According to AGB Nielsen Philippines' Nationwide Urban Television Audience Measurement People in Television Homes, the pilot episode of My Mother, My Story earned a 3.0% rating.

== Accolades ==
Accolades received by My Mother, My Story
Year	Award	Category	Recipient	Result	Ref.
2025	38th PMPC Star Awards for Television	Best Celebrity Talk Show	My Mother, My Story	Won	
2025	38th PMPC Star Awards for Television	Best Celebrity Talk Show Host	Boy Abunda	Won	
