= Genesis (TV series) =

2013 Philippine television drama series

- Title card
- Genre: Science fiction drama
- Written by: Aloy Adlawan; Obet Villela; Glaiza Ramirez
- Directed by: Joyce E. Bernal; Mark A. Reyes V
- Creative director: Jun Lana
- Starring: Dingdong Dantes
- Theme music composer: Kedy Sanchez
- Opening theme: "Nandiyan Palagi" by Regine Velasquez
- Ending theme: "Ikaw Pa Rin" by Kaligta; "Alinlangan" by Renz Verano and Sheryn Regis
- Country of origin: Philippines
- Original language: Tagalog
- No. of episodes: 55

Production
- Executive producers: Nivea M. Sabit; Rebya Upalda
- Production locations: Quezon City; Tondo, Manila; Dumaguete; Olongapo City; Laguna; Baguio
- Camera setup: Multiple-camera setup
- Running time: 18–30 minutes
- Production company: GMA Entertainment TV

Original release
- Network: GMA Network
- Release: October 14 – December 27, 2013

Genesis is a 2013 Philippine television drama science fiction series broadcast by GMA Network. Directed by Joyce E. Bernal and Mark A. Reyes V, it stars Dingdong Dantes. It premiered on October 14, 2013 on the network's Telebabad line up. The series concluded on December 27, 2013, with a total of 55 episodes.

The series is streaming online on YouTube.

== Cast and characters ==
Cast

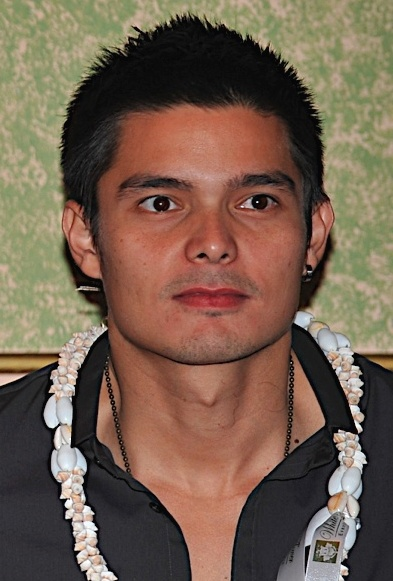
Dingdong Dantes

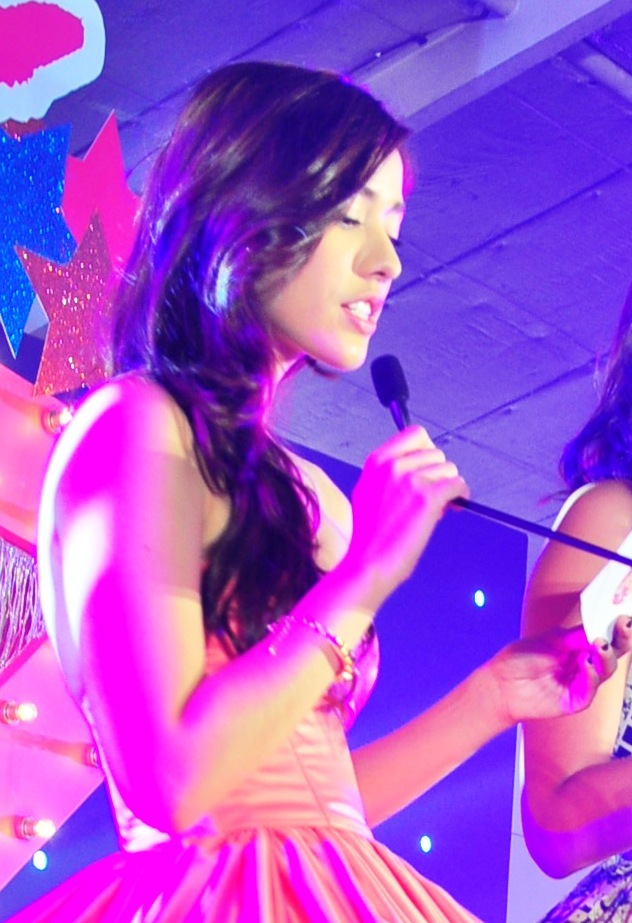
Lauren Young

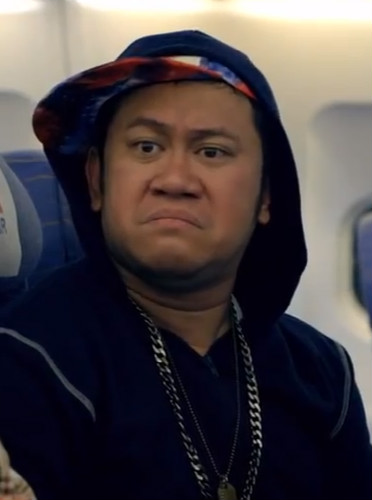
Betong Sumaya

Lead cast

- Dingdong Dantes as Isaak Macalintal

Supporting cast

- Rhian Ramos as Racquel Hernandez-De Guzman
- TJ Trinidad as Paolo De Guzman
- Jackie Lou Blanco as Ramona Escalabre
- Lorna Tolentino as Sandra Sebastian-Trinidad
- Ronnie Henares as Emil Trinidad
- Irma Adlawan as Fely Hernandez
- Carlo Gonzales as Waldo Calderon
- Betong Sumaya as Lito "Tolits" Dimagiba
- Luane Dy as Jill Galvez
- Sasha Baldoza as Osie Macalintal
- Rainier Gison as MJ Trinidad
- Annette Samin as Summer Trinidad
- Lauren Young as Sheila Sebastian-Santillian

Guest cast

- Angel Aquino as a hologram speaker
- Isabelle Daza as Helen
- Snooky Serna as Elena Santillian
- Laurice Guillen as Rosario Macalintal
- Lito Legaspi as Leandro Macalintal
- Robert Arevalo as Eduardo Sebastian
- Gardo Versoza as Ka Andoy
- Mark Anthony Fernandez as Joel
- Ervic Vijandre as Fredo
- Daria Ramirez as Linda
- Juan Rodrigo as Lazon
- Derrick Monasterio as Randy
- Barbie Forteza as Faith
- Sharmaine Arnaiz as Donna Dimaano
- Rolly Innocencio as Jeffrey
- Mike Lloren as Alberto
- Art Acuña as a policeman
- Archie Adamos as a policeman
- Edwin Reyes as a policeman
- Pauleen Luna as younger Sandra
- Timothy Chan as younger Isaak
- Jillian Ward as younger Racquel

== Ratings ==
According to AGB Nielsen Philippines' Mega Manila household television ratings, the pilot episode of Genesis earned a 22.5% rating. The final episode scored a 22.1% rating.
