= Carlo Gonzales =

Filipino actor

- Born: Jose Carlo D. González
- Occupation: Actor
- Years active: 2006–present
- Spouse: Luane Dy (m. 2019)
- Children: 1

Jose Carlo Dela Cruz González, better known for his stage name Carlo Gonzales, is a Filipino actor who joined Survivor Philippines: Celebrity Doubles Showdown.

== Filmography ==
=== Film ===
Year	Title	Role	Notes
2006	Matakot Ka sa Karma	The Devil	Segment: "Tokador"
2007	Angels	David	Segment: "Daddy's Angel"
2010	You to Me Are Everything	Baste	
2012	Kimmy Dora and the Temple of Kiyeme	Johnson's Beatman	
2013	The Bride and the Lover	Greg	
2013	Pedro Calungsod: Batang Martir	Padre Tomas de Cadeñoso	
2023	Voltes V: Legacy – The Cinematic Experience	Draco	

=== Television ===
Year	Title	Role	Network
2009	Stairway to Heaven	Enrico Samson	GMA Network
2010	Langit sa Piling Mo	William Jimenez	GMA Network
2010	Jillian: Namamasko Po	Ralph	GMA Network
2011	I Heart You, Pare!	Caloy	GMA Network
2011	Survivor Philippines: Celebrity Doubles Showdown	Himself / One of the castaways	GMA Network
2012	Legacy	Gary	GMA Network
2013	Bukod Kang Pinagpala	Oscar	GMA Network
2013	Genesis	Romualdo "Waldo" Calderon	GMA Network
2014–2016	The Half Sisters	Dr. Paolo	GMA Network
2015	Pari 'Koy	Simon Cruz	GMA Network
2015–2016	Because of You	Henry Sodico	GMA Network
2016	Magpakailanman: Ang Kriminal na Binuhay ng Diyos	Diego Gutierrez	GMA Network
2016–2017	Encantadia	Mashna Muros (Lireo's Kingdom)	GMA Network
2018	Sherlock Jr.	SPO2 Bernardo Matias	GMA Network
2018–2019	Cain at Abel	Ronald	GMA Network
2020	Descendants of the Sun	Val Domingo	GMA Network
2023	Voltes V: Legacy	Draco	GMA Network
2025	Encantadia Chronicles: Sang'gre	Muros	GMA Network
