= Lavender Fields (TV series) =

Philippine action drama television series

- Season 1 title card
- Genre: Action drama Soap opera
- Written by: Maribel G. Ilag; Mark Gopez; Ceres Helga Barrios; Jon David Garcia; Rio Legaspi
- Directed by: Emmanuel Q. Palo; Jojo A. Saguin
- Starring: Jodi Sta. Maria
- Country of origin: Philippines
- Original language: Filipino
- No. of seasons: 2
- No. of episodes: 100

Production
- Executive producers: Carlo Katigbak; Cory Vidanes; Laurenti Dyogi; Roldeo Endrinal; Kylie Manalo-Balagtas; Rondel Lindayag
- Producer: Hazel Bolisay Parfan
- Camera setup: Single-camera
- Running time: 21–38 minutes
- Production company: Dreamscape Entertainment

Original release
- Network: Kapamilya Channel (Note: The series also airs on A2Z, Jeepney TV, TV5 and TFC. It is also streaming via Kapamilya Online Live, and on-demand in advanced episodes via iWantTFC and Netflix.)
- Release: September 2, 2024 – January 17, 2025

Lavender Fields is a Philippine action drama television series produced by Dreamscape Entertainment. Directed by Emmanuel Q. Palo and Jojo A. Saguin, it stars Jodi Sta. Maria in the title role, together with Janine Gutierrez and Jericho Rosales. The series aired on Kapamilya Channel's Primetime Bida evening block from September 2, 2024 to January 17, 2025, with a total of 2 seasons and 100 episodes.

== Cast and characters ==
Cast

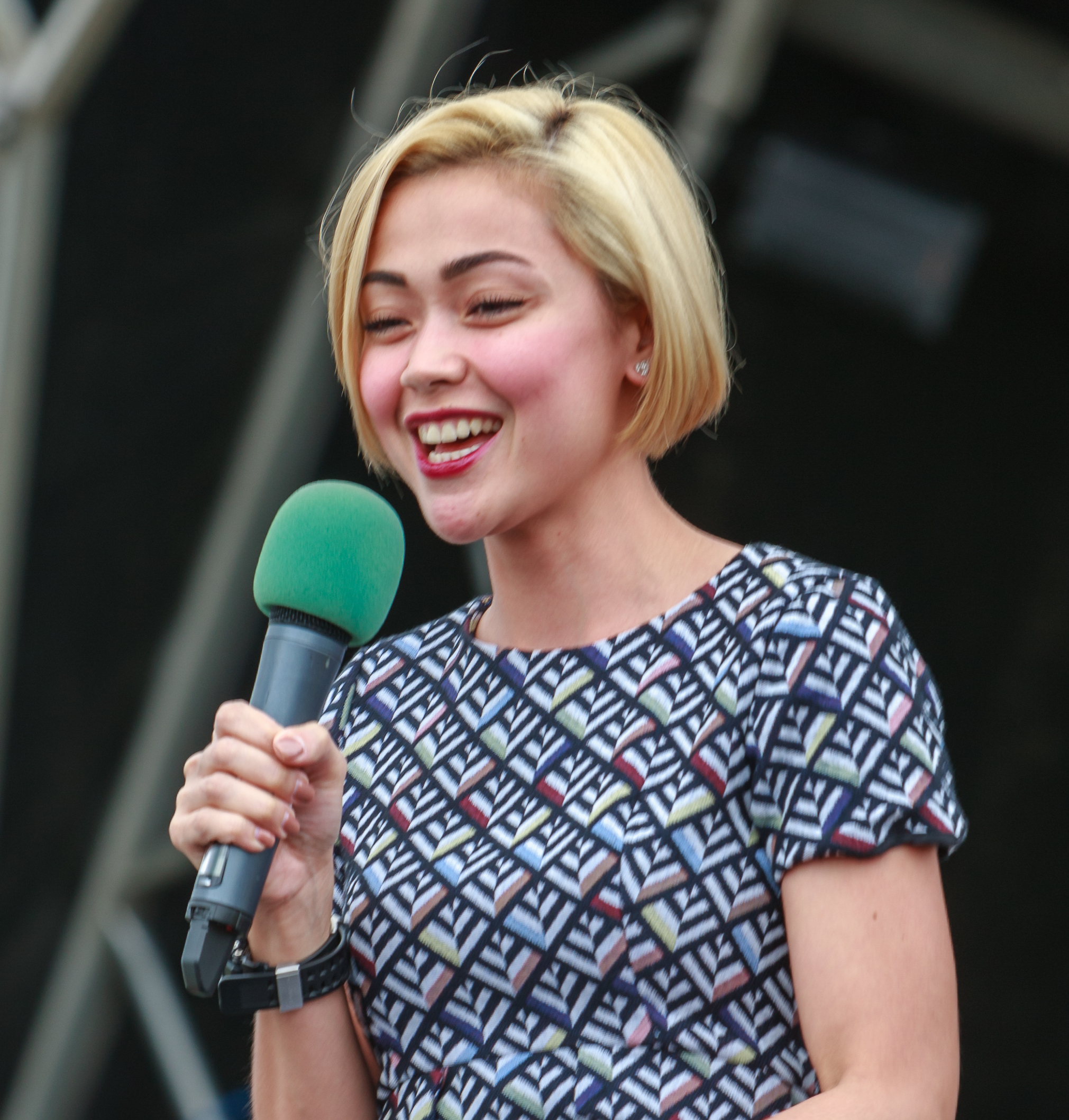
Jodi Sta. Maria

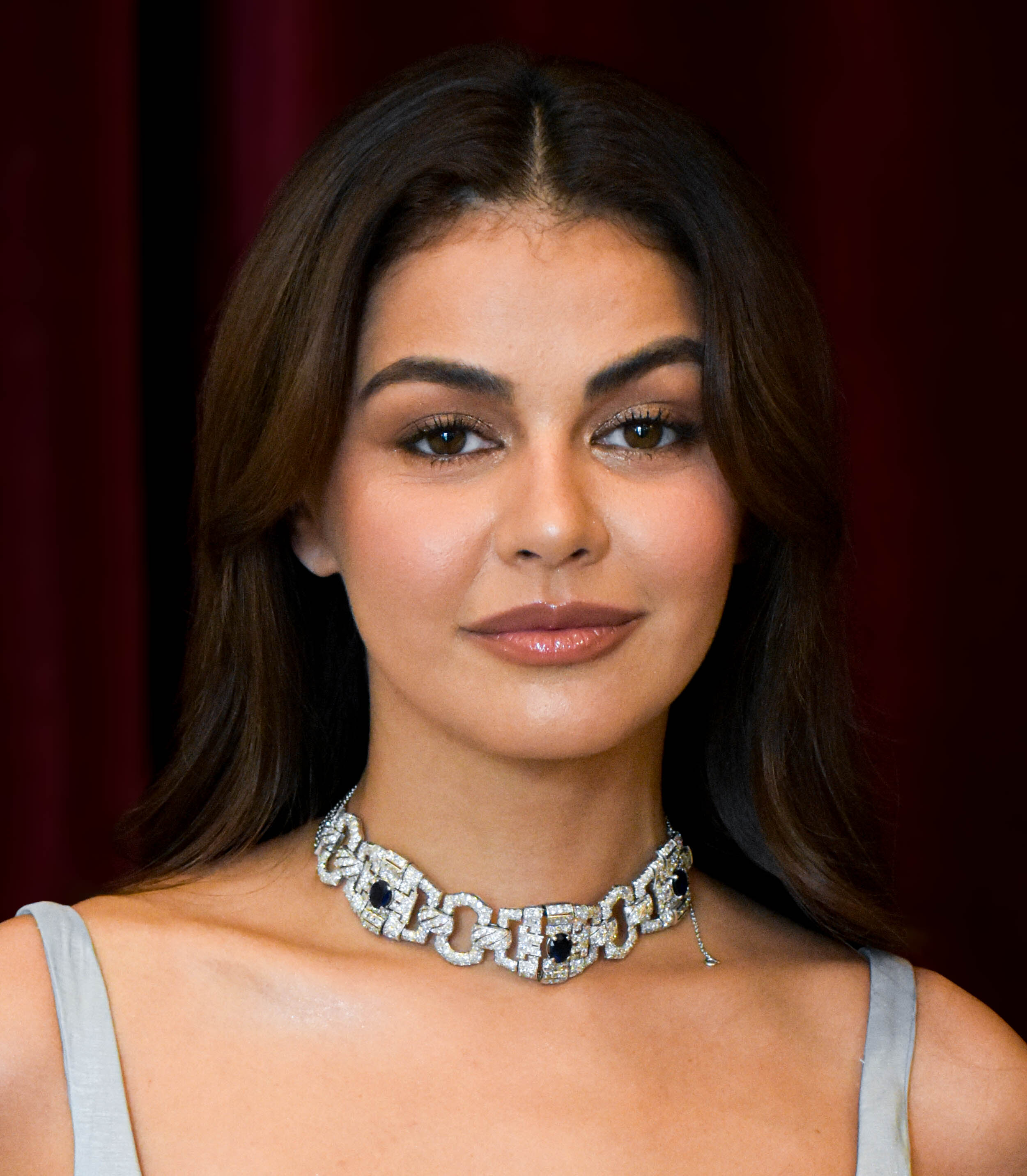
Janine Gutierrez

Jericho Rosales

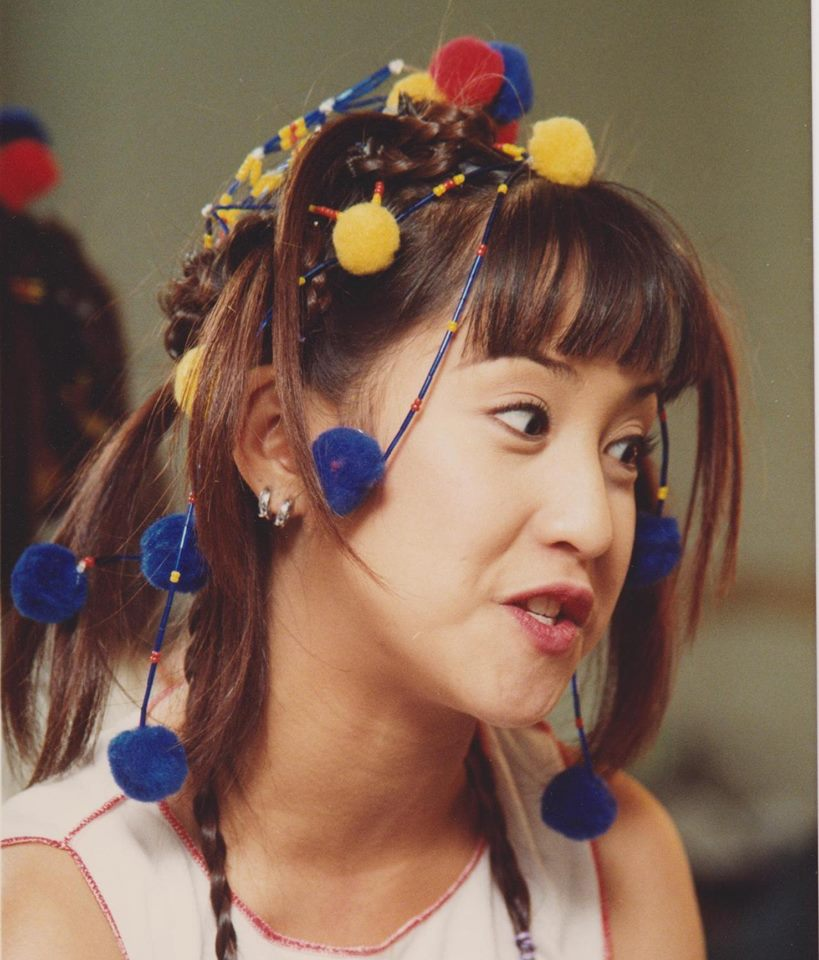
Jolina Magdangal

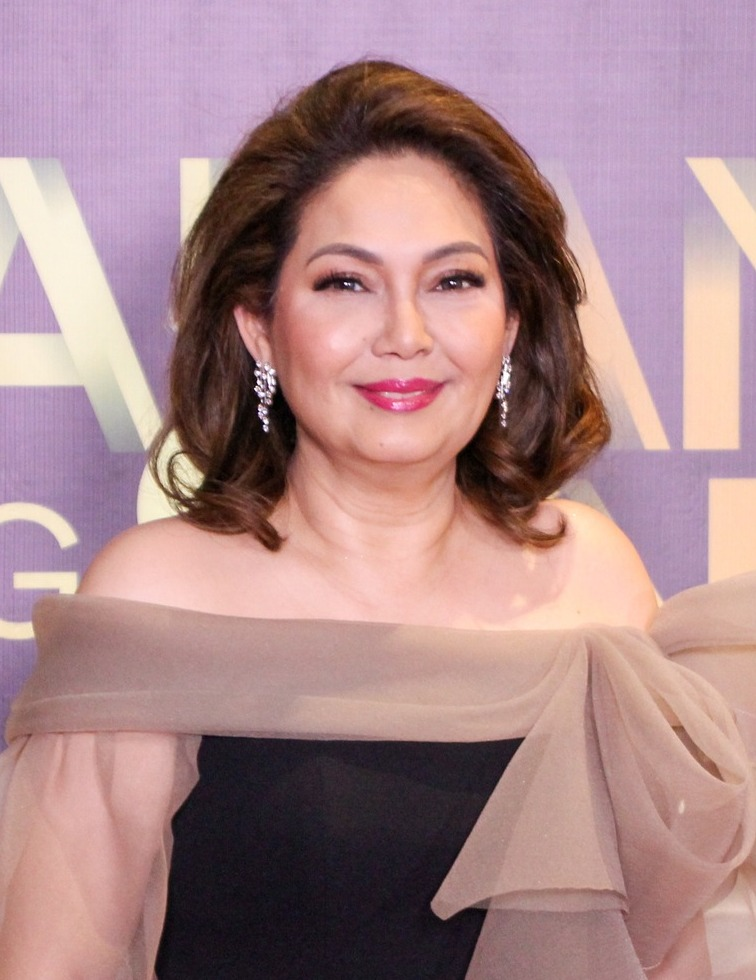
Maricel Soriano

=== Main cast ===
- Jodi Sta. Maria as Jasmin Flores / Lavender Fields
- Janine Gutierrez as Iris Buenavidez
- Jericho Rosales as Tyrone de Vera
- Albert Martinez as Zandro Fernandez
- Edu Manzano as Vittorio Buenavidez
- Jolina Magdangal as Lily Atienza
- Maricel Soriano as Aster Fields

=== Supporting cast ===
- Jana Agoncillo as Mirasol "Mira" Gallego
- Krystal Mejes as Myrtle Hidalgo
- Miguel Vergara as John Paul "JP" Madrigal
- Marc Santiago as Gio Albano
- Victor Neri as Maximo "Max" Albano
- Bernard Palanca as Harry Hidalgo
- Thou Reyes as Jethro Joven
- Biboy Ramirez as Lance Atienza
- Race Matias as Eric Pascual
- Justine Luzares as Patrick Madrigal
- Pamu Pamorada as Petunia Hidalgo
- Alex Diaz as Ian
- Eric Nicolas as Berting
- Benj Manalo as Tommy
- Cheena Crab as Dahlia
- Kate Alejandrino as Marigold Fields-Gallego
- Analain Salvador as Heather Buenavidez
- Jonic Magno as Rod Corpuz
- Yesh Burce as Lydia Albano
- Soliman Cruz as Chief Benjamin Esteban
- Marvin Yap as Agent Castro
- Janell Gonzaga as Camilla Atienza
  - Kathrielle Amara Valdez as baby Camilla / Bela F. de Vera
  - Gianina Lolita as preteen Camilla
- Mira Lumbayan as Rose Hidalgo
- Natalia Espejo as Angel Albano

=== Guest cast ===
- Archi Adamos as Fernan
- Gardo Versoza as Andres Flores
- Lotlot de Leon as Rosita Flores
- Louise Abuel as Carlos "Carlo" Fernandez
- Marela Torre as Stephanie Jacinto
- Markus Paterson as Frederico "Freddie" Valderama
- Roxanne Guinoo as Ivy Fernandez
- Joel Molina as Mira's Father

== Episodes ==
=== Series overview ===
Season	Episodes	Originally released	
Season	Episodes	First released	Last released
1	50	September 2, 2024	November 8, 2024
2	50	November 11, 2024	January 17, 2025

=== Season 1 ===
No.	Title	TV title	Original air date (Note: iWantTFC shows two episodes first in advance before it broadcasts on TV while Netflix shows three episodes in advance.)
1	"The Trust of the Innocent"	"Unang Tagpo"	September 2, 2024
Life at San Remo is a matter of quiet routine for Jasmin. But when she falls in love with Arthur, his dangerous secret threatens to ruin them both.
2	"Breaking Hearts"	"Panloloko"	September 3, 2024
Jasmin makes an unexpected discovery even as Arthur is nowhere to be found. Meanwhile, his life begins to unravel back at home.
3	"Death and Deception"	"Bistado"	September 4, 2024
Jasmin searches for answers after seeing Arthur's parting gift, but Iris and her family hunt him down for their own reasons.
4	"Search for Answers"	"Siyasat"	September 5, 2024
Hoping to get payback, Vittorio sends his men to search for Jasmin in San Remo. The cops start looking deeper into Tyrone's death.
5	"In the Face of the Enemy"	"Harapan"	September 6, 2024
Jasmin comes to terms with the aftermath of her harrowing encounter with Iris. Zandro puzzles over the unusual details of Tyrone's case.
6	"The Escape of Jasmine"	"Bagong Pag-asa"	September 9, 2024
On the run from Iris and the police, Jasmin gives birth while in hiding. But soon, she meets another misfortune — and an unexpected ally.
7	"The Birth of Lavender Fields"	"Bagong Mukha"	September 10, 2024
Jasmin clumsily hits back at Iris, but Aster soon teaches her a better way to take revenge: by assuming a charming new persona called Lavender Fields.
8	"The Woman in Sheep’s Clothing"	"Celebration"	September 11, 2024
An upcoming party offers Jasmin the chance to get to know her enemies. But first, she must infiltrate Iris' circle of friends under her new identity.
9	"Familiar Foe"	"Encounter"	September 12, 2024
Zandro refuses to give up on finding the culprit behind Tyrone's case. At the party, Jasmin lands in trouble with one of Vittorio's hired guns.
10	"The Investigation"	"Imbestigasyon"	September 13, 2024
Determined to find her child, Jasmin sneaks around Max's house to look for clues — only to have a brush with the cops. Zandro reveals his suspicions.
11	"Long Lost Daughter"	"Max"	September 16, 2024
Jasmin does Iris a favor and doubles down on her identity as Lavender. Soon, she faces the consequences of her scrap with Max and her recent mission.
12	"Getting Close"	"Angel"	September 17, 2024
On a visit to Max's family, Lavender discovers the truth about Angel. Meanwhile, Zandro follows a trail of clues that implicates her old persona.
13	"Befriending the Enemy"	"Tiwala"	September 18, 2024
Petunia's insensitive blunder gives Lavender the opportunity to befriend Iris, who opens up to her. Zandro starts looking into Aster's company.
14	"The Good and the Bad Memories"	"Plano"	September 19, 2024
Zandro tries to figure out how Aster is involved in his case. Iris looks back on her relationship with Tyrone while Lavender continues to win her over.
15	"Suspecting Lavender"	"Masid"	September 20, 2024
Zandro believes that Lavender is hiding something after observing her up close. But his clever attempt to gather information doesn't go as planned.
16	"The Uninvited Guest"	"Camilla"	September 23, 2024
Lavender works on a party at Vittorio's house and looks for a way to take down the Buenavidez family and clear her name.
17	"Face Off"	"Laban"	September 24, 2024
Zandro arrives at the party to investigate. Meanwhile, Lavender carries out a clandestine operation that puts her identity at risk.
18	"Hook, Line & Sink Her"	"Hanap"	September 25, 2024
Zandro recovers surprising evidence from the party and tries to piece things together. Meanwhile, the search for Jasmin intensifies.
19	"Finding Jasmin Flores"	"Wanted"	September 26, 2024
As the hunt for Jasmin continues, Aster advises Lavender to lie low. Zandro defies orders. Iris has a tense encounter with a stranger.
20	"The Fugitive in Distress"	"Hunting"	September 27, 2024
Iris follows a lead that could point her in the right direction, leaving Lavender strapped for time. Mira grows curious about Jasmin.
21	"Identity Crisis"	"Suspetsa"	September 30, 2024
While Zandro continues to investigate Lavender, somebody else tries to unmask her. A vengeful Iris decides to locate Jasmin's daughter.
22	"The Victim"	"Captured"	October 1, 2024
Zandro catches Lavender off guard and presses her about her true identity. Iris plots her next move after her accomplices fail to find Jasmin.
23	"Hospital Hunt"	"Tagu-Taguan"	October 2, 2024
Trapped inside a hospital, Lavender comes clean to Zandro and desperately searches for a way out as Vittorio and Iris close in on her.
24	"The Innocent and the Guilty"	"Intensyon"	October 3, 2024
Jasmin learns Aster's true motive for helping her. Because of his discovery and removal from the case, Zandro believes Jasmin is innocent.
25	"Only Hope"	"Tulong"	October 4, 2024
Gio gets in trouble at school after JP calls him the son of a murderer. Iris faces her enemy again, while Jasmin agrees to work with Zandro
26	"Unlikely Encounter"	"Isang Misyon"	October 7, 2024
Jasmin tells Zandro that her family's fate is in the hands of the Buenavidez. Iris is unhappy with Heather's arrival, so leaves and meets someone new.
27	"Friend or Foe"	"Deception"	October 8, 2024
Jethro approaches Iris at a bar and invites her to go somewhere else. Zandro recalls when his wife met Tyrone, then calls Jasmin to arrange a meeting.
28	"Student and Master"	"Training"	October 9, 2024
Zandro trains Jasmin and starts planning how to get into the Buenavidez's illegal business. Iris tries to find a connection between Jethro and Jasmin.
29	"Who is Back?"	"Resulta"	October 10, 2024
The DNA test confirms one of the three girls is Jasmin's daughter. After abducting Jethro, Iris hunts for someone she thought was long dead.
30	"The Raid"	"Undercover"	October 11, 2024
Iris convinces Jethro to tell her the truth about Jasmin, who has no choice but to give in. Lavender joins Zandro and Eric to raid a pier.
31	"Smuggled"	"Smuggled"	October 14, 2024
Heather joins Vittorio's underground business. Zandro and Agent Pascual blocked Iris's operations, while Jasmin tries to rescue Jethro.
32	"Unlikely Help"	"Kasabwat"	October 15, 2024
Iris stands firm that Jasmin and Jethro are working together. Jasmin proposed a deal with Jethro. Tyrone recalls how he escaped death.
33	"Double Trouble"	"Set Up"	October 16, 2024
Jasmin and Zandro plans how to entrap Iris, with Jethro's help. But Iris outwits them, which caused an action-filled encounter.
34	"Two Faces"	"Protektahan"	October 17, 2024
Lavender goes out with Iris, who treats Heather with a cold shoulder. Lavender finds a chance to approach Camilla. Iris received an unexpected call.
35	"Haunted by the Past"	"Pagbabalik"	October 18, 2024
Iris is worried about the news of Tyrone's return. Lavender considers the possibility that Camilla is her daughter. Tyrone travels back to Carvallo.
36	"Cleaning Up the Mess"	"Siwalat"	October 21, 2024
Zandro tells Jasmin the reason he's suspicious of Tyrone. Vittorio loses his temper and blames Iris and Harry over the thwarted operations.
37	"Rebirth of the Dead"	"Tensyon"	October 22, 2024
Jasmin gets to know Zandro more when he told her what happened to his family. Vittorio seems to favor Heather, so Iris despises her sister more.
38	"Love and Lies"	"Second Chance"	October 23, 2024
Tyrone meets with a woman from his past and asks for another chance to make things right. Zandro forms a deeper connection with Lavender.
39	"The Return"	"Damayan"	October 24, 2024
Iris wants to believe that Tyrone has changed, but Lily is not convinced. Lavender reminds Zandro of his late wife. The DNA test results are now out.
40	"A Mother's Yearning"	"Pangungulila"	October 25, 2024
Lavender gets a chance to be with Camilla. Aster and Zandro remind her not to be so obvious. Lance is more determined to leave the Buenavidezes.
41	"The Traitors"	"Taksil"	October 28, 2024
Lance meets a familiar face, making Harry more suspicious of him. Zandro searches for evidence to prove the Buenavidezes' involvement in Carvallo Port.
42	"The Good Intentions"	"Paghaharap"	October 29, 2024
Someone unexpectedly helps Lance escape death, with Lavender risking her own safety in the process. Iris wants to know Tyrone's intentions.
43	"The Face of Hell"	"Tapusin"	October 30, 2024
Tyrone faces a furious Vittorio, who puts his loyalty to the test. Lily realizes the dangers that her family might experience from the Buenavidezes.
44	"Unthinkable"	"Patunayan"	October 31, 2024
Tyrone proves his loyalty to the family. Iris reveals her reason for accepting Tyrone back into her life and later puts Heather in her place.
45	"A Race to the Truth"	"Pag-amin"	November 1, 2024
Jasmin goes to the hospital to check on Lance, while Tyrone is already there in secret. The Buenavidezes goes into action to get to Lance first.
46	"Duplicity"	"Balatkayo"	November 4, 2024
The Buenavidezes manage to silence Lance for good. Lavender comforts, Lily, leading to an argument with Zandro. Tyrone uses Iris to cover his tracks.
47	"Fated Connection"	"Habilin"	November 5, 2024
Tyrone looks back on the past and realizes be was destined to meet Jasmin. Lavender comforts Camilla, who's grieving her father's death.
48	"Echoes of the Past"	"Dalaw"	November 6, 2024
Tyrone visits the graves of people who pushed him to leave his dubious life, including Rosita's. Jasmin arrives to pay respect to her mother.
49	"Condolences and Conflicts"	"Burol"	November 7, 2024
Jasmin feels anger and grief again after seeing Tyrone. Tyrone makes amends with Iris' friends and Vittorio convinced them to just forget the past.
50	"A Wrench to the Plan"	"Pangamba"	November 8, 2024
Their world becomes more dangerous so Aster's fear for Jasmin and Mira intensifies. Tyrone confesses to Iris, and Zandro reveals something to Jasmin.

=== Season 2 ===
No. overall	No. in season	Title	TV title	Original air date
51	1	"One on One"	"Face Off"	November 11, 2024
Zandro finally encounters Tyrone. Aster burns all of Jasmin's research about the Buenavidezes, trying to get rid of them all—or so she thinks.
52	2	"Make Peace"	"Halik"	November 12, 2024
Zandro is dismissed from work. Lavender suggests he make peace with Tyrone. Vittorio and Iris found Jasmin's journal, finding a link with Marigold.
53	3	"Mind Games"	"Panggapan"	November 13, 2024
Tyrone meets Camilla. Tyrone encounters Zandro again, criticizing Jasmin. Iris and Vittorio hire Lavender and Aster to organize BSM's anniversary.
54	4	"Destined Reunion"	"Katapatan"	November 14, 2024
Tyrone joins Harry on a mission to hunt the people who attacked Iris and Vittorio. Lavender and Tyrone run into each other during BSM's anniversary.
55	5	"Pain of the Past"	"Talikuran"	November 15, 2024
Lavender tries to avoid Tyrone during the anniversary. Amid the luxurious arrangements, tension fills the air when someone mentioned Marigold's name.
56	6	"Homebreaking"	"Paglusob"	November 18, 2024
Mira was harmed when Vittorio's men break into Aster's house. Heather remembers the past when Marigold was mentioned. Tyrone spots a familiar face.
57	7	"An Unexpected Knight in Shining Armor"	"Pagtugis"	November 19, 2024
Harry and Tyrone run after Zandro and Lavender. Zandro fights with Harry while Lavender tries to escape. Someone unexpectedly arrives to save her.
58	8	"Ex-posed"	"Rebelasyon"	November 20, 2024
Tyrone confesses everything to Lavender during their heated confrontation, and she reveals a secret. Zandro continues to hunt down Tyrone.
59	9	"Secrets Within Secrets"	"Mga Lihim"	November 21, 2024
A secret from the past hunts Vittorio. Tyrone spends time with an important person in his life. Zandro is disappointed with Tyrone helping Jasmin.
60	10	"Cat in a Lion's Lair"	"Linlang"	November 22, 2024
Despite people's objections, Lavender turns to the Buenavidezes to work with them against Aster. Harry catches Lavender and Tyrone together.
61	11	"Sham Alliances"	"Pagkukunwari"	November 25, 2024
Tyrone and Lavender continue with their plans, but their enemies can see through their lies. Zandro stays with Lavender, while Aster visits Mira.
62	12	"Loyalty Check"	"Alitan"	November 26, 2024
As Harry discovers more, Vittorio continues to test Tyrone's loyalty. Lavender finds herself caught in the growing tension between Tyrone and Zandro.
63	13	"Naked Truth"	"Makipaglaro"	November 27, 2024
Lavender takes Tyrone to Aster's house so he can clean up after a fight with Zandro. Iris is also on her way there to catch them red-handed.
64	14	"Irreplaceable"	"Katauhan"	November 28, 2024
Iris finds a way to confirm the link between Lavender and Jasmin, without Tyrone noticing her moves. Zandro realizes what he feels for Lavender.
65	15	"Hard Pill to Swallow"	"Maskara"	November 29, 2024
Aster finds the truth about what happened to Marigold. Lavender organizes Iris and Tyrone's anniversary, unaware of her archenemy's surprise for her.
66	16	"Set the Record Straight"	"Katotohanan"	December 2, 2024
Tyrone reflects on what he truly feels for Iris and Jasmin. Lily discovered a recorded message from his late husband.
67	17	"The Setup"	"Aster"	December 3, 2024
Iris shocks everyone with her speech at the anniversary party. Vittorio's men abducted Aster and Mira. Aster learns the truth about her daughter.
68	18	"The Big Reveal"	"Likod ng Maskara"	December 4, 2024
Iris reveals that Lavender is Jasmin Flores. Mira manages to escape, but encounters Harry again after Myrtle finds her and brings her home.
69	19	"Unforeseen Grief"	"Trahedya"	December 5, 2024
While in hiding, Lavender learns what happened to Aster and Mira. Camilla accidentally watched Lance's video message for Lily.
70	20	"Behind Enemy Lines"	"Sanib Pwersa"	December 6, 2024
Lily cannot hide her fear while Iris discusses her plan to use Tyrone and Jasmin's missing child. Only one person can help both Jasmin and Harry.
71	21	"The Choice"	"Magkalaban"	December 9, 2024
Zandro has a difficult decision when Lavender asked him to work with Tyrone. Iris finally discovers who Tyrone and Lavender's missing child is.
72	22	"Unbearable Bargain"	"Ina sa Ina"	December 10, 2024
Mira mourns Aster's death. Vittorio was arrested by the authorities. Lavender tries to get to Camilla first before Iris does.
73	23	"Pivotal Partnerships"	"Kasunduhan"	December 11, 2024
Jasmin was stopped by a checkpoint while travelling to her and Camilla's hideout. Zandro receives a big favor from Iris in exchange of a partnership.
74	24	"Tug of Hearts"	"Pagsasama"	December 12, 2024
Tyrone arrives at Jasmin's hideout, spends time with them. Zandro gets reinstated, thanks to the Buenavidezes. Patrick learns of Lily's plan.
75	25	"Friends No More"	"Traydor"	December 13, 2024
Patrick chooses between love and loyalty as he stops Ian from exposing Lily's plan. Jasmin feels bad that she doesn't know Camilla well enough.
76	26	"Emergency"	"Kapabayaan"	December 16, 2024
Jasmin panics over Camilla's allergic reactions. Lily arrives and brings them to the hospital. Tyrone locates where Vittorio produces illegal arms.
77	27	"Changing Sides"	"Pasabog"	December 17, 2024
Zandro sides with the Buenavidezes, Vittorio can easily escape the law. Tyrone slips into the production site of illegal arms to gather evidence.
78	28	"Sinking Ship"	"Lulubog Lilitaw"	December 18, 2024
Lily Learns the truth behind Lance's death. Vittorio's company starts to sink after Tyrone exposed his family's illegal activities.
79	29	"A Tale of Two Mothers"	"Ama, Ina, Anak"	December 19, 2024
Lily and Jasmin work together to take care of Camilla. Heather feels guilty as Mira asks for justice. Another crime of the Buenavidezes is exposed.
80	30	"Family Day"	"Family Day"	December 20, 2024
Tyrone, Jasmin, and Camilla bond at the art museum, while Zandro tells Iris where. Vittorio and Heather try to escape but someone feels guilty.
81	31	"True Colors"	"Hulihan"	December 23, 2024
Vittorio and Heather's plan to escape fails. Jasmin faces Iris again at the museum, that ends in a bloody confrontation when Iris guns down Jasmin.
82	32	"Behind Bars"	"Kulungan"	December 24, 2024
Iris is imprisoned when Jasmin and Zandro's plan succeeds. Mira's heart shatters again when she confirms that the remains found is her mother's.
83	33	"A Tale of Two Fathers"	"Padre De Pamilya"	December 25, 2024
Despite being allies, Zandro still doubts Tyrone's innocence in the death of his family. Vittorio insists that everything he did was for the family.
84	34	"Good Girl"	"Simpatya"	December 26, 2024
Iris behaves in prison to gain sympathy. Before turning himself in, Tyrone enjoys his moments with Camilla and reveals his secret to Jasmin.
85	35	"The Arrest"	"Kabayaran"	December 27, 2024
Zandro arrests Tyrone, but took him to another place instead of the police station. Someone is following them. Iris receives an unexpected news.
86	36	"Painful Decisions"	"Konsensiya"	December 30, 2024
Harry confesses the whole truth to Zandro. Vittorio finds a way to get Iris out of jail. Lily and Patrick have a tough decision to make.
87	37	"Unforgettable Celebration"	"Kaarawan"	December 31, 2024
Tyrone makes the most of his time with Jasmin and Camilla and celebrates his birthday with them Meanwhile, Iris is preparing to visit them.
88	38	"The Uninvited"	"Panagutan"	January 1, 2025
Camilla remember Lance while celebrating Tyrone's birthday. Iris then arrives to deliver a very special gift to Tyrone.
89	39	"New Iris"	"Desisyon"	January 2, 2025
Iris tries to convince everyone that she has changes for the better. With Iris being free, Tyrone finds it harder to say goodbye to Jasmin and Camilla.
90	40	"A Day at the Park"	"Lasunin"	January 3, 2025
Iris' friends surrender to the authorities, affecting their children. Jasmin and Lily plan to tell the truth to Camilla, but Iris beats them.
91	41	"The Godmother"	"Sa Kamay ni Iris"	January 6, 2025
A nightmare becomes a reality when Camilla goes missing, likely being held by Iris. Tyrone is being transferred to the same prison as Vittorio.
92	42	"Unstoppable"	"Bakbakan"	January 7, 2025
Despite Zandro's objections, Jasmin is unstoppable as she trespasses Iris' house with Lily's help. Heather finally gains consciousness.
93	43	"A Mother's Dream"	"Magulang"	January 8, 2025
Jasmin's dream turns into reality when Lily tells the truth to Camilla. Iris finds a new reason to hate Jasmin. Tyrone is transferred to another jail.
94	44	"Riot"	"Riot"	January 9, 2025
Jasmin bids farewell to the people who helped her, including Lavender fields. Tyrone faces Vittorio and fights to stop Vittorio's evil plans.
95	45	"The Breakout"	"Kumawala"	January 10, 2025
Tyrone escapes jail to warn Jasmin that Vittorio also escaped prison. Zandro and Eric get into a deadly encounter while bringing Iris to jail.
96	46	"Tricks and Treachery"	"Bahay na Bato"	January 13, 2025
Vittorio's men succeed in abducting Lily and Camilla. Jasmin and Tyrone took all their chances to rescue their daughter from Vittorio and Iris.
97	47	"For the Love of a Child"	"Sakripisyo"	January 14, 2025
Jasmin and Lily bravely face Iris. Iris retreats as her weakness emerged. Desperate to save Camilla from Vittorio, a life is put in danger.
98	48	"A Child for a Child"	"Anak sa Anak"	January 15, 2025
Jasmin takes Heather hostage to force Vittorio to surrender Camilla. Vittorio and Iris arrive with the child, unaware of Jasmin and Heather's plans.
99	49	"The Chase till the End"	"Paniningil"	January 16, 2025
In the midst of chaos, Iris tries to escape with Camilla leading to a chase. Fighting until the end, Vittorio pays the price for his wrongdoings.
100	50	"Lav-Ender"	"Ang Huling Pagtutuos"	January 17, 2025
Vittorio ultimately pays for his wrongdoings. But before facing his punishment, he makes sure to get rid of his family's mortal enemy—Jasmin Flores.

== Production ==
On June 4, 2024, Lavender Fields was announced by Dreamscape Entertainment, with Jodi Sta. Maria cast in the lead role.

ABS-CBN began to reveal each of the cast members every week, followed by an interview from MJ Felipe.

A series of events such as the announcement shoot, script reading and look test also took place, wherein more cast members are revealed. A behind-the-scenes of those events were also shared through ABS-CBN Entertainment YouTube channel.

The official trailer of the series was released on August 6, 2024.

== Music ==
"Maskara" is an original song composed and performed by Regine Velasquez and Ogie Alcasid. It is the theme song of the series.

== Release ==
Lavender Fields was released on Netflix on August 30, 2024, and on iWantTFC on August 31, before premiering on television broadcast platforms on September 2. The series consists of 100 episodes.

== Reception ==
=== Ratings and viewership ===
According to Nielsen NUTAM People Survey, Lavender Fields debuted with a TV rating of 9.9 percent, ruling over its timeslot rival Widows' War. The series opened with 629,565 live concurrent viewers and peaked on October 4, 2024, with 755,332 on Kapamilya Online Live streamed through YouTube. The series debuted at number-one on Netflix Philippines' most watched series chart on August 30, 2024.

=== Awards and nominations ===
Award	Date	Category	Nominee(s)	Result	Ref.
PMPC Star Awards for Television	March 23, 2025	Best Primetime Drama Series	Lavender Fields	Nominated	
PMPC Star Awards for Television	March 23, 2025	Best Drama Actor	Jericho Rosales	Nominated	
PMPC Star Awards for Television	March 23, 2025	Best Drama Actress	Jodi Sta. Maria	Nominated	
PMPC Star Awards for Television	March 23, 2025	Best Drama Supporting Actress	Janine Gutierrez	Won	
PMPC Star Awards for Television	March 23, 2025	Best Drama Supporting Actress	Maricel Soriano	Nominated	
PMPC Star Awards for Television	March 23, 2025	Best Child Performer	Natalia Espejo	Nominated	
Gawad Pasado Awards	October 25, 2025	Best Actress	Jodi Sta. Maria	Won	
Gawad Pasado Awards	October 25, 2025	Best Actor	Jericho Rosales	Won	
Gawad Pasado Awards	October 25, 2025	Best Supporting Actress	Janine Gutierrez	Won	
