= Pera Paraan =

Philippine television infotainment show

- Title card since 2024
- Genre: Infotainment
- Presented by: Susan Enriquez
- Country of origin: Philippines
- Original language: Tagalog

Production
- Camera setup: Multiple-camera setup
- Production company: GMA Public Affairs

Original release
- Network: GMA News TV (2020–21); GTV (2021); GMA Network (since 2021)
- Release: July 22, 2020 – present

Pera Paraan (transl. money way) is a Philippine television infotainment show broadcast by GMA News TV, GTV and GMA Network. Hosted by Susan Enriquez, it premiered on July 22, 2020, on GMA News TV's New Normal: The Survival Guide line up. In February 2021, GMA News TV was rebranded as GTV, with the show being carried over. The show moved to GMA Network on October 16, 2021, on the network's Saturday morning line up.

== Premise ==
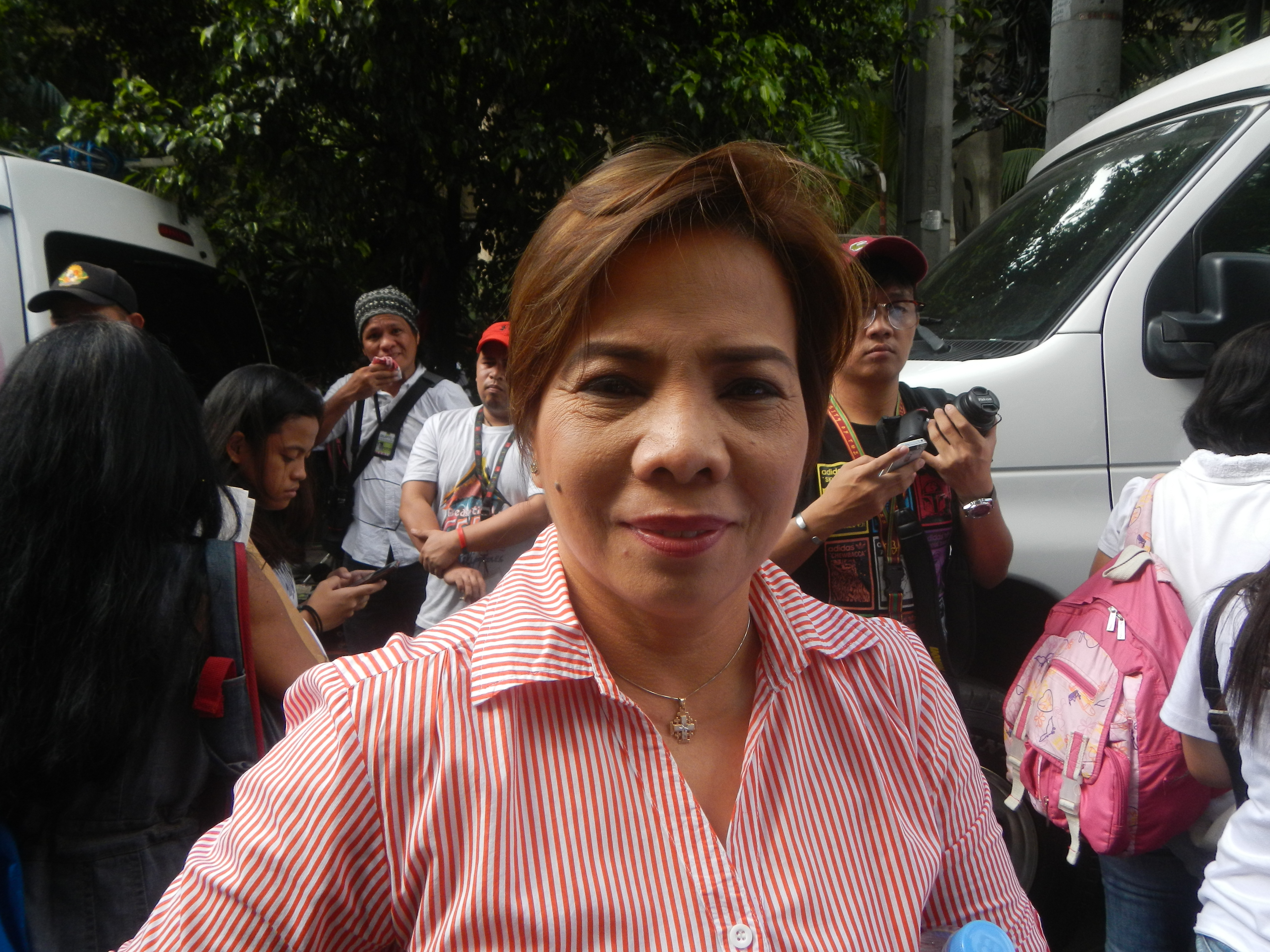
Susan Enriquez serves as a host.

The show features guides on how to handle finances, making additional financial income through a home-based set up. It also features smaller business that succeeded during the enhanced community quarantine in the Philippines.

== Accolades ==
Accolades received by Pera Paraan
Year	Award	Category	Recipient	Result	Ref.
2022	16th Gandingan Awards	Special Citation: Gandingan ng Kabuhayan	Pera Paraan	Won	
2025	38th PMPC Star Awards for Television	Best Educational Program	Pera Paraan	Pending	
2025	38th PMPC Star Awards for Television	Best Educational Program Host	Susan Enriquez	Pending	
