= Eagle News International =

Philippine defunct television news show

- Also known as: Eagle News Evening Edition
- Genre: News broadcasting
- Presented by: Alma Angeles
- Country of origin: Philippines
- Original language: English

Production
- Production locations: EBC Bldg., #25 Central Avenue, New Era, Quezon City, Metro Manila, Philippines
- Camera setup: Single-camera setup
- Running time: 30-60 minutes

Original release
- Network: NET25
- Release: October 24, 2011 – April 1, 2022

Related
- Mata ng Agila International

Eagle News International is a Philippine television news broadcasting show broadcast by NET25. Originally anchored by Alma Angeles and Feamor Tiosen, it aired from October 24, 2011 to April 1, 2022. and was replaced by Mata ng Agila International, Angeles and CJ Hirro serve as the final anchors. This show serves as a reliable source for the most current global news, providing a balanced and impartial presentation of events while remaining accessible and up-to-date and correspondents are strategically positioned in various regions, encompassing Europe, the United States, South Africa, Asia/ASEAN countries, allowing the program to deliver comprehensive coverage of international events and issues.

The program is streaming online on YouTube.

== Anchors ==
- Alma Angeles (2011–22)

Former anchors

- Feamor Tiosen (2011–13)
- Sam Cepeda (2013–20)
- CJ Hirro (2020–22)

== Filipino edition ==
Eagle News International
- Genre: News broadcasting
- Presented by: Maricar Velasco
- Country of origin: Philippines
- Original language: Filipino

Production
- Production locations: EBC Bldg., #25 Central Avenue, New Era, Quezon City, Philippines
- Camera setup: Single-camera setup
- Running time: 30 minutes

Original release
- Network: NET25
- Release: October 2, 2018 – February 12, 2021

Originally anchored by Mariel Soriano, Maricar Velasco and Ben Bernaldez, the Filipino edition of Eagle News International aired from October 1, 2018 to February 12, 2021, replacing Chinese News TV and was replaced by Balitalakayan. Velasco served as the final anchor.

=== Anchors ===
- Maricar Velasco (2018–21)

Former anchors

- Mariel Soriano (2018–19)
- Ben Bernaldez (2018–20)

== See also ==
- NET25
