= Mata ng Agila =

Philippine television news show

- Title card since 2021
- Also known as: Mata ng Agila Primetime
- Genre: News broadcasting
- Created by: Net 25
- Directed by: Arlyn Catabui (2011–20)
- Presented by: Alex Santos; Ali Sotto
- Narrated by: Alex Santos
- Theme music composer: Ernie Magtuto

Production
- Executive producer: Ligaya Salvador
- Production locations: EBC Building, #25 Central Avenue, New Era, Quezon City, Philippines
- Camera setup: Single-camera setup
- Running time: 90 minutes

Original release
- Network: Net 25
- Release: October 24, 2011 – present

Mata ng Agila (transl. eagle eye) is a Philippine television news broadcasting program aired by Net 25. It premiered on October 24, 2011, replacing i-Balita on the network's evening lineup. The show was originally anchored by Ely Saludar, Weng Dela Fuente, and Sam Cepeda. Alex Santos and Ali Sotto currently serve as the anchors.

The program is also streaming online on YouTube.

On January 31, 2022, the program updated its theme song.

== Anchors ==
Anchors

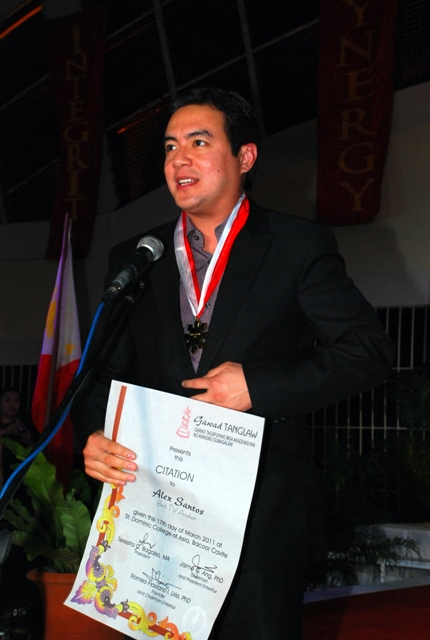
Alex Santos serves as an anchor.

- Alex Santos (since 2022)
- Ali Sotto (since 2024)

=== Substitute anchors ===
- Nina Ricci Alagao-Flores (since 2022)
- Luane Dy (since 2026)

=== Segment presenters ===
- Gianna Llanes (since 2024, Hot Stuff)

=== Former anchors ===
- Ely Saludar (2011–21)
- Weng dela Fuente (2011–17)
- Pia Okut-Galang (2017–19)
- Judith Llamera (2019–20)
- Sam Cepeda (2011–20)
- Vic de Leon Lima (2020–22)
- Emma Tiglao (2020–23)
- Rikki Mathay (2022–24)

=== Former segment presenters ===
- Gel Miranda (2014–18, Entertainment News)
- Ben Bernaldez (2018–19, Eagle News Sports)
- Phoebe Publico (2018–20, Entertainment News)
- Andrea Mendres (2018–20, Entertainment News)
- Cess Alvarez (2018–20, Entertainment News)

=== Former substitute and interim anchors ===
- Earlo Bringas (2018–20)
- Olivia Naguit-Figueroa (2018–20)
- Judith Llamera (2019–22)
- Wej Cudiamat (2019–26)
- Marie Ochoa (2019)
- Mylene Mariano-Rivera (2020)
- Toni Aquino (2021)
- Apple David (2021)
- Nelson Lubao (2021)
- Weng dela Fuente (2022)
- CJ Hirro (2022)

== Mata ng Agila International ==
Originally anchored by CJ Hirro and Nina Ricci Alagao-Flores, the late-night edition of Mata ng Agila premiered on April 4, 2022, on the network's evening lineup, replacing the weeknight edition of Eagle News International. It was the only English-language newscast to retain a title in the native language until April 1, 2024, when Mata ng Agila International transitioned to a Tagalog newscast to make way for World News, which aired on the same date until May 23, 2025. Alagao-Flores and Rikki Mathay currently serve as the anchors.

=== Anchors ===
- Nina Ricci Alagao-Flores (since 2022)
- Rikki Mathay (interim anchor, 2023; main anchor, since 2024)

==== Former anchors ====
- CJ Hirro (2022–23)
- Gianna Llanes (2023–24)
- Alma Angeles (2024–25, World News anchor)

==== Former interim anchors ====
- Atty. Randy Bernardino (2023)

== Mata ng Agila sa Tanghali ==
Originally anchored by Wej Cuidamat and Gianna Llanes, the noontime edition of Mata ng Agila premiered on June 26, 2023, on the network's noontime slot. Llanes currently serves as the sole anchor.

=== Anchors ===
- Gianna Llanes (since 2023)

=== Substitute anchors ===
- Nina Ricci Alagao-Flores (since 2026)
- Rikki Mathay (since 2026)
- Luane Dy (since 2026)

=== Former anchors ===
- Wej Cudiamat (2023–26)
- Weng dela Fuente (2026)

== Mata ng Agila Weekend ==
Originally anchored by Gel Miranda and Onin Miranda, the weekend edition of Mata ng Agila premiered on June 30, 2012, on the network's Saturday evening lineup, replacing Eagle News Weekend Edition. Luane Dy currently serves as the sole anchor.

=== Anchor ===
- Luane Dy (since 2026)

=== Substitute anchors ===
- Mar Gabriel (since 2022)
- Rikki Mathay (since 2025)
- Nina Ricci Alagao-Flores (since 2025)

=== Former anchors ===
- Gel Miranda (2012–18)
- Onin Miranda (2012–18)
- Judith Llamera (2018–22)
- Gerald Rañez (2018–22)
- Wej Cudiamat (2019–26)
- Louisa G. Erispe (2022)
- Gem Pacson (2025)
- Weng dela Fuente (2025–26)

== See also ==
- List of NET25 original programming
