= Kada Umaga =

Philippine television show

- Title card since 2023
- Genre: News broadcasting; Talk show
- Directed by: Ed Tinaza
- Presented by: Pia Guanio; Daiana Menezes; Luane Dy
- Theme music composer: Tats Faustino
- Country of origin: Philippines
- Original language: Filipino

Production
- Executive producer: Niñazel Cruz
- Production locations: EBC Bldg, #25 Central Avenue, New Era, Quezon City, Metro Manila, Philippines
- Camera setup: Single-camera setup
- Running time: 2 hours

Original release
- Network: NET25
- Release: August 30, 2021 – present

Kada Umaga (transl. Every Morning) is a Philippine television talk show broadcast by NET25. Originally hosted by Tonipet Gaba, Emma Tiglao, Maureen Schrijvers, Wej Cudiamat, and Pia Guanio, It premiered on August 30, 2021, replacing Pambansang Almusal on the network's morning line up. Guanio, Daiana Menezes, and Luane Dy currently serve as the hosts.

The program is streaming online on YouTube.

== Hosts ==
=== Current hosts ===
- Pia Guanio (since 2021)
- Daiana Menezes (since 2022)
- Luane Dy (since 2026)

=== Former hosts ===
- Tonipet Gaba (2021–23)
- Maureen Schrijvers (2021–22)
- Wej Cudiamat (2021–23)
- Emma Tiglao (2021–25)
- Via Lorica (2025–26)
- Jasmine Paguio (2025–26)

=== Former segment presenter ===
- Earlo Bringas (2021–23; "Kada Balita" Traffic Update segment presenter)

== See also ==
- List of NET25 original programming
