= Daiana Menezes =

Brazilian singer and actress

- Born: Daiana Alves Menezes; June 20, 1987 (age 39); Belo Horizonte, Minas Gerais, Brazil
- Other name: Amiga
- Years active: 2007–present
- Agents: GMA Artist Center (2007–2012; 2017–present) Talent5 (2008–2009; 2010–2011; 2016); New York Film Academy; (2013)
- Height: 5 ft 9 in (175 cm)

Daiana Alves Menezes (born June 20, 1987) is a Brazilian actress, singer, and television host based in the Philippines. Menezes is best known as a former co-host of noontime variety show Eat Bulaga! and is currently a presenter of the morning television show Kada Umaga on NET25.

== Career ==
Menezes worked with her father in their growing shoe business, leading her to take a Fashion Design business course. She later graduated from the New York Film Academy. Offers from several countries, including Thailand, were followed by one in the Philippines. She appeared in various commercials internationally before becoming a TV personality in the Philippines on TV5, ABS-CBN, and GMA Network. She was featured in Maxim Philippines' June 2009 issue and in FHM Philippines' October 2011, 2014, and 2017 issues. She endorses Baliwag Lechon, Master Siomai, Flauntit, Rebisco Hansel Crackers, Texas Wild chips, Choco Mucho, Judge (chewing gum), Sassa Activewear, Belo, Pretty Looks, Lady Grace and Ever Bilena, Mike Cervera Hair, Shell, and Scratch It!.

Menezes was awarded 2022 best host at the Best Choice Awards, best television host and singer of 2022 at the Pinnacle Awards, the 2020 NCCA for "performing arts singing", and was previously the prestigious 2012, 2014 and 2015 Global Achiever Awardee as Outstanding Ramp Model and Commercial Endorser by the Asia Pacific Awards Council (APAC) during the 20th Annual Asia Pacific Excellence Awards, headed by chairman Jonathan Navea and Japanese educator, Dr. Seiji Yii-Kagawa.

Menezes also got the highest, record-breaking bid for a second-hand bikini to help raise funds for a beach conservation drive in the Philippines. The bidder paid ₱100,000 for her used bikini on November 28, 2012.

Menezes was the main host of two taped (not live) TV shows on Pinoy Xtreme, Super Sabong (since 2015) and #chikatitas. She is now concentrating on her music with the 8ONE group.

== Personal life ==
As a college student, Menezes was an international model, pianist, and painter. She went to Centro Universitário UNA in Belo Horizonte taking Fashion Design, and New York Film Academy, New York City. A small town, Bairro Menezes in Cataguases, Minas Gerais, was named after her grandfather, Romualdo Menezes.

In 2013, Menezes joined PETA's campaign to free Mali, an Asian elephant, from Manila Zoo and have her transferred to Boon Lott's Elephant Sanctuary where she would have access to proper veterinary care, space to roam, and to be in the company of other elephants. Mali has been in captivity in Manila for more than three decades after she was poached from the wild but has since died.

Apart from her native Portuguese, Menezes is also fluent in English and Tagalog.

== 8ONE ==
Daiana Menezes expanded her career into music by co-founding the international music group 8ONE, alongside producer and singer Ryan Klos (KLØS), rapper Tommie King, and freestyle artist KXNG. Menezes and her group members were exposed to various music styles from around the world, shaping 8ONE’s unique sound that blends hip-hop, R&B, house, and pop. The group gained traction by performing on TV and radio, appearing on Magic 89.9 FM’s “Boys Night Out”, and Wave 89.1’s “The Bounce” with Mighty Dash.

On March 1, 2019, Menezes and her group 8ONE performed as the opening act for Aloe Blacc at Okada Manila. As part of the event, Menezes and 8ONE debuted four original songs—"Therapy," "November," "Mango," and "Simon AF"—which she co-wrote and recorded with Ryan Klos, Tommie King, and KXNG. On April 12, 2019, Menezes and 8ONE performed as the opening act for electronic music legend Fatboy Slim. Their participation in high-profile concerts such as these helped solidify their presence in the international music scene.

== Filmography ==
=== Film ===
Year	Title	Role
2008	Dobol Trobol: Lets Get Redi 2 Rambol!	Vivian
2009	Yaya and Angelina: The Spoiled Brat Movie	Yaya Foreigner
2012	Sketch	Stephanie
2012	My Amiga Girl	Margarita Avez Mercedes

=== Television ===
Year	Title	Role
2007–2012	Eat Bulaga!	Herself / Co-host
2008–2009	Ogags	Herself / Host
2008	LipGloss	Patrice
2008	Carlo J. Caparas' Joaquin Bordado	Ivarna
2009	Bitoy's Funniest Videos	Herself / Co-host
2009–2010	Bubble Gang	Herself
2009–2010	SOP	Herself / Performer
2010–2011	My Darling Aswang	Bella
2010–2011	Paparazzi	Herself / Host
2011	Iskul Bukol	Helga
2011	Lokomoko	Herself
2012	Umagang Kay Ganda	Herself / Segment host
2014	Tunay na Buhay	Herself / Guest
2015	Kapamilya, Deal or No Deal	Herself / No. 14 (Lucky Star)
2015	It's Showtime	Herself / Judge
2015–present	Super Sabong	Herself / host
2016	HAPPinas Happy Hour	Herself / performer
2017	Fiercest of Them All	Herself / host
2022–present	Kada Umaga	Herself / main host

== Music career ==
Year	Song/Album	Role	Notes
2018	"Syanel"	Singer	With Marija Debelic, produced by Ryan Klos and Georges Lim
2019	"Feels Like"	Singer	As member of 8ONE
2019	"Low"	Singer	As member of 8ONE, with DJ Luane
2019	"Back to the Crib"	Singer	As member of 8ONE
2022	"November"	Singer	With KLØS & KXNG
