= Bianca Umali =

Filipino actress (born 2000)

- Umali in 2026
- Born: Maria Isadora Bianca Soler Umali; March 2, 2000 (age 26); Parañaque, Philippines
- Occupations: Actress; television host; singer; dancer; model
- Years active: 2001–present
- Agent: Sparkle GMA Artist Center
- Partner: Ruru Madrid (2018–present)

Maria Isadora Bianca Soler Umali (Tagalog pronunciation: [ʊˈmali]; born March 2, 2000) is a Filipino actress, television host, singer, dancer, and model.

== Early life and education ==
Maria Isadora Bianca Soler Umali was born on March 2, 2000 in Parañaque, Philippines. She is the only child of May Soler and Jose Vicente Umali; both parents died from breast cancer in 2005 and a heart attack in 2010, respectively. Umali was later raised by her paternal grandmother, Victorina. She has older half-siblings from their previous relationships: two half-sisters from her mother and three half-brothers and one half-sister from her father. Umali also has relatives in Malolos. She attended junior high school for the homeschooling program at Learning Garden Montessori School in Parañaque. She attended senior high school at Veritas Parochial School, which was later renamed Veritas Catholic School, in Parañaque under the HUMSS track, and graduated in 2019.

== Career ==
=== As a commercial model and endorser ===
Umali started her career as a commercial model at age two. She appeared in several TV commercials such as EQ Diapers and Nestle Ice Cream. She was also a product endorser for the children's clothing line of Natasha.

In 2021, Umali became an endorser for Bench.

=== As a host and actress ===
In 2009, at age nine, Umali signed under GMA Network on an exclusive contract and became one of the hosts of a child-oriented show Tropang Potchi. In the same year, she had a cameo role as an orphan in Darna and portrayed the role of young Nancy Rosales on the TV series Kaya Kong Abutin ang Langit.

In 2011, she signed a management contract under Sparkle GMA Artist Center.

From 2017 and onwards, she portrayed Lawiswis in Mulawin vs. Ravena, Crisanta in Kambal, Karibal, Sahaya in the TV show of the same name, Farrah in Legal Wives and Irene in the second installment of Mano Po Legacy.

From 2023 and onwards, Umali appeared as a guest hosts of It’s Showtime, aired on Kapamilya Channel, A2Z, All TV and GMA Network.

In 2025, Umali starred in the spin-off of the 2016 fantasy drama series Encantadia entitled Encantadia Chronicles: Sang'gre as Terra, the daughter of the earth goddess Danaya (played by Sanya Lopez). She previously aspired to make a part of the reboot. In preparation for the role, Umali trained in arnis.

=== Recording artist ===
In 2018, Umali signed a recording contract under GMA Music. As of 2021, she had released two songs: "Kahit Kailan" and "Itigil Mo Na".

== Personal life ==
Umali dated Miguel Tanfelix from 2014 to 2017. In 2022, actor Ruru Madrid confirmed that he and Umali had been dating for four years. Umali is an ambassador for World Vision International and the Department of the Interior and Local Government's anti-drug campaign, "Buhay Ingatan, Droga'y Ayawan" (transl. "Protect Life, Fight Drugs"). In December 2020, Umali became a member of Iglesia ni Cristo.

== Discography ==
=== Singles ===
Year	Title	Album	Label
2020	Kahit Kailan	Non-album singles	GMA Music
2021	Itigil Mo Na	Non-album singles	GMA Music

== Filmography ==
=== Film ===
Year	Title	Role
2009	Yaya and Angelina: The Spoiled Brat Movie	Cameo role
2012	My Kontrabida Girl	young Isabel Reyes
2013	My Lady Boss	Bea (Zach's younger sister)
2017	Barbi D' Wonder Beki	Miley
2019	Banal	Erika
2019	Family History	Jenna Roque
2024	Mananambal	Alma
2026	Ella Arcangel: Awit ng Pangil at Kuko	Ella Arcangel
2026	Always Yours, Never Mine	Gaea

=== Television ===
Television series

Year	Title	Role
2009	Jollitown	Olive
2009	Darna	One of the orphans
2009	Sine Novela: Kaya Kong Abutin ang Langit	young Nancy Rosales
2011	Magic Palayok	Dina
2012–2013	Paroa: Ang Kuwento ni Mariposa	Leah
2013	Unforgettable	Julia Regalado
2013	Mga Basang Sisiw	Faye Santos
2014	Niño	Gracie
2014	Dading	Teen Precious Rodrigues
2015	Once Upon a Kiss	Mariella "Ella" Servando-Rodrigo
2016	Wish I May	Carina "Cacai" Atienza-Vergara / Carina Pizarro-Gomez
2017	Mulawin vs. Ravena	Lawiswis "Wis" / Emily
2017–2018	Kambal, Karibal	Crisanta "Crisan" Abaya Bautista / Victoria / Crisanta "Crisan" Enriquez Magpantay
2019	Sahaya	Sahaya Alari Mangayao
2020	Halfworlds	
2021	Legal Wives	Farrah Valeandong-Makadatu
2022	Mano Po Legacy: Her Big Boss	Irene Pacheco
2022	Happy Together	Issa / NBI Agent Gretchen Tuazon (guest)
2023	The Write One	Joyce Herrera
2025–2026	Encantadia Chronicles: Sang'gre	Terra

Television anthologies

Year	Title	Role
2013	Maynila: Best Bet ng Puso	Myra
2013	One Day, Isang Araw: Gamer Girl	Liezel
2013	Magpakailanman: School Bullying Caught on Cam	Abigail "Abby"
2014	Love Hotline: 18 and In Love	Jen Darlene Torres
2014	Seasons of Love Presents: First Dance, First Love	Jasmine Natividad
2015	Maynila: Type Kita, Type Mo Ay Iba	Cheska
2015	Wagas: May Forever	young Lilian
2015	Love Hotline: Runaway Girl	Juvy
2015	Magpakailanman: My Teacher, My Rapist	Myla
2015	Maynila: Love Wins	Meg
2015	Dangwa: Idol	Lia De Guzman / Sabrina
2015	Wish Ko Lang: Ang Araw Niya'y Buwan	Kim
2016	Maynila: Don't Give Up On Us	Anna
2016	Alamat: Alamat ng Gagamba	Anlalawa
2016	Maynila: To Love and To Hope	Hope
2016	Wagas: Lolo Pops Love Story	Pacita
2016	Dear Uge: How to Move On	Heart
2016	Usapang Real Love: Dream Date	Grace Anne Manalo
2017	Karelasyon: My Family	Charming
2017	Wish Ko Lang: Maya	Maya
2017	Dear Uge: Coach Me, I'm Falling	Dina
2017	Daig Kayo ng Lola Ko: The Toy Soldier and Ballerina Doll Love Story	Rina
2017	Daig Kayo ng Lola Ko: The Aswang Slayer	Kristel
2018	Tadhana: Ate	Arlene Blanquisco
2018	Daig Kayo ng Lola Ko: Dobol, Tripol, Trobol	Ella
2021	Regal Studio Presents: The Signs	Moira

Television specials

Year	Title	Role
2017	Eat Bulaga Lenten Special: Kaibigan	Denise
2017	Alaala: A Martial Law Special	Rizalina "Lina" Ilagan

Various shows

Year	Title	Role
2009–2013	Tropang Potchi	Herself (performer and co-host)
2014–2015	Sunday All Stars	Herself (performer and co-host)
2014–2016	Ismol Family	Yumi
2016	A1 Ko Sa 'Yo	Paula
2017	Full House Tonight	Herself (performer and co-host)
2017	Tunay na Buhay	Herself (guest)
2017	All Star Videoke	Herself (player)
2017	Road Trip	Herself (guest)
2018–2019	Sunday PinaSaya	Herself (performer and co-host)
2021–2023	All-Out Sundays	Herself (performer and co-host)
2022–2023	Eat Bulaga!	Herself (co-host)
2023–present	It's Showtime	Herself (guest performer and judge)
2023	It's Your Lucky Day	Herself (co-host)
2024	Tahanang Pinakamasaya!	Herself (guest hostl
2025	Pinoy Big Brother: Celebrity Collab Edition	Herself (guest)

== Awards and nominations ==
Awards and nominations received by Bianca Umali
Award	Year (Note: Indicates the year of ceremony. Each year is linked to the article about the awards held that year, wherever possible.)	Category	Nominated work	Result	Ref.
Box Office Entertainment Awards	2019	Most Popular Love Team for Television	—N/a	Won (Note: Shared with Miguel Tanfelix)	
Box Office Entertainment Awards	2020	Most Popular Love Team for Television	—N/a	Won	
FAMAS Awards	2015	German Moreno Youth Achievement Award	—N/a	Won	
FAMAS Awards	2019	German Moreno Memorial Youth Achievement Award	—N/a	Won	
PMPC Star Awards for Television	2011	Best Children's Show Host	Tropang Potchi	Nominated (Note: Shared with Julian Trono, Ella Cruz, Sabrina Man, and Gabriela Cruz)	
PMPC Star Awards for Television	2023	Best Single Performance by an Actress	Magpakailanman (Episode: "Sayaw ng Buhay")	Nominated	
Seoul International Drama Awards	2022	Outstanding Asian Star	Legal Wives	Nominated	
