= 24th PMPC Star Awards for Television =

24th education of the PMPC Star Awards

- Date: November 13, 2010; November 20, 2010 (Delayed Telecast)
- Location: Newport Performing Arts Theater, Resorts World Manila, Pasay
- Hosted by: Angel Aquino; Ruffa Gutierrez; Miriam Quiambao

Television/radio coverage
- Network: ABS-CBN
- Produced by: CAMERA Entertainment Productions Inc.

The 24th PMPC Star Awards for TV ceremony was held at the Newport Performing Arts Theater, Resorts World Manila in Pasay on November 13, 2010 and broadcast over ABS-CBN Channel 2 on November 20, 2010. The ceremony was hosted by Angel Aquino, Ruffa Gutierrez and Miriam Quiambao.

== Awards and nominees ==
These are the nominations for the 24th Star Awards for Television. The winners are in bold.

Network	Total # of Nominees
ABS-CBN	124
NBN	5
TV5	25
GMA	73
RPN	1
Q	24
IBC	4
Studio 23	5
Net 25	8
UNTV	10

Network	Total # of Winners (including Special Awards)
ABS-CBN	29
TV5	2
GMA	15
Q	3
Net 25	2
UNTV	3

=== Best TV station ===
- **ABS-CBN-2**
- NBN-4
- TV5
- GMA-7
- RPN-9
- Q-11
- IBC-13
- Studio 23
- Net 25
- UNTV-37

=== Best Primetime TV Series ===
- Agua Bendita (ABS-CBN 2)
- **Dahil May Isang Ikaw (ABS-CBN 2)**
- Habang May Buhay (ABS-CBN 2)
- Ikaw Sana (GMA 7)
- Kung Tayo'y Magkakalayo (ABS-CBN 2)
- Tanging Yaman (ABS-CBN 2)

=== Best Daytime Drama Series ===
- Kambal sa Uma (ABS-CBN 2)
- Kung Aagawin Mo Ang Lahat Sa Akin (GMA 7)
- Magkano Ang Iyong Dangal? (ABS-CBN 2)
- Nagsimula sa Puso (ABS-CBN 2)
- Precious Hearts Romances Presents: Impostor (ABS-CBN 2)
- **Rosalka (ABS-CBN 2)**

=== Best Drama Mini-Series ===
- Precious Hearts Romances Presents: Love Me Again (ABS-CBN 2)
- SRO Cinemaserye: Exchange Gift (GMA 7)
- **SRO Cinemaserye: The Eva Castillo Story (GMA 7)**
- Your Song: Gaano Kita Kamahal (ABS-CBN 2)
- Your Song: Love Me, Love You (ABS-CBN 2)

=== Best Drama Actor ===
- Gerald Anderson (Your Song: Isla / ABS-CBN 2)
- **Dingdong Dantes (Stairway to Heaven / GMA 7)**
- John Estrada (Dahil May Isang Ikaw / ABS-CBN 2)
- Sid Lucero (Dahil May Isang Ikaw / ABS-CBN 2)
- Coco Martin (Kung Tayo’y Magkakalayo / ABS-CBN 2)
- Piolo Pascual (Lovers in Paris / ABS-CBN 2)
- Jericho Rosales (Dahil May Isang Ikaw / ABS-CBN 2)

=== Best Drama Actress ===
- Kim Chiu (Kung Tayo’y Magkakalayo / ABS-CBN 2)
- Chin Chin Gutierrez (Dahil May Isang Ikaw / ABS-CBN 2)
- Angelica Panganiban (Rubi / ABS-CBN 2)
- Cherry Pie Picache (Sineserye Presents: Florinda / ABS-CBN 2)
- Susan Roces (Sana Ngayong Pasko / GMA 7)
- **Maricel Soriano (Sineserye Presents: Florinda / ABS-CBN 2)**
- Judy Ann Santos (Habang May Buhay / ABS-CBN 2)
- Lorna Tolentino (Dahil May Isang Ikaw / ABS-CBN 2)

=== Best Drama Anthology ===
- 5 Star Specials (TV5)
- **Maalaala Mo Kaya (ABS-CBN 2)**
- Maynila (GMA 7)

=== Best Single Performance by an Actress ===
- Irma Adlawan (Maalaala Mo Kaya: Sulo / ABS-CBN 2)
- Gina Alajar (Maalaala Mo Kaya: Car / ABS-CBN 2)
- **Gretchen Barretto (Maalaala Mo Kaya: Larawan / ABS-CBN 2)**
- Angel Locsin (Maalaala Mo Kaya: Litrato / ABS-CBN 2)
- Aiza Seguerra (Maalaala Mo Kaya: Kuwintas / ABS-CBN 2)
- Maricel Soriano (5 Star Special Presents / TV5)
- Dawn Zulueta (Maalaala Mo Kaya: Tsinelas / ABS-CBN 2)

=== Best Single Performance by an Actor ===
- **Gerald Anderson (Maalaala Mo Kaya: Lubid / ABS-CBN 2)**
- Martin del Rosario (Maalaala Mo Kaya: Headband / ABS-CBN 2)
- Lester Llansang (Maalaala Mo Kaya: Musiko / ABS-CBN 2)
- Zanjoe Marudo (Maalaala Mo Kaya: Bag / ABS-CBN 2)
- Dominic Ochoa (Maalaala Mo Kaya: Kuwintas / ABS-CBN 2)
- Jolo Revilla (Maalaala Mo Kaya: Gitara / ABS-CBN 2)
- Ronaldo Valdez (Maalaala Mo Kaya: Bisikleta / ABS-CBN 2)

=== Best New Male TV Personality ===
- Hermes Bautista (Your Song: Isla / ABS-CBN 2)
- Carlo J. Caparas (Kroko: Takas sa Zoo / IBC 13)
- Paul Jake Castillo (Your Song: Isla / ABS-CBN 2)
- Jason Francisco (Melason In Love / ABS-CBN 2)
- Elmo Magalona (Party Pilipinas / GMA 7)
- Tom Rodriguez (Your Song: Isla / ABS-CBN 2)
- **Johan Santos (Precious Hearts Romances Presents: Love Me Again / ABS-CBN 2)**
- Julian Trono (Panday Kids / GMA 7)

=== Best New Female TV Personality ===
- **Carla Abellana (Rosalinda / GMA 7)**
- Alynna Asistio (Lokomoko U / TV5)
- Melai Cantiveros (Melason In Love / ABS-CBN 2)
- Sabrina Man (Panday Kids / GMA 7)
- Xyriel Manabat (Agua Bendita / ABS-CBN 2)
- Cathy Remperas (Precious Hearts Romances: Love Me Again / ABS-CBN 2)
- Princess Velasco (ASAP XV / ABS-CBN 2)
- Frencheska Farr (Party Pilipinas / GMA 7)

=== Best Gag Show ===
- **Banana Split (ABS-CBN 2)**
- Bubble Gang (GMA 7)
- Goin' Bulilit (ABS-CBN 2)
- Laff En Roll (GMA 7)
- Wow Mali (TV5)

=== Best Comedy Show ===
- Everybody Hapi (TV5)
- George and Cecil (ABS-CBN 2)
- My Darling Aswang (TV5)
- Pepito Manaloto (GMA 7)
- **Show Me Da Manny (GMA 7)**

=== Best Comedy Actor ===
- **Ogie Alcasid (Bubble Gang / GMA 7)**
- Jayson Gainza (Banana Split / ABS-CBN 2)
- Pooh (Banana Split / ABS-CBN 2)
- Vic Sotto (My Darling Aswang / TV5)
- Michael V. (Bubble Gang / GMA 7)

=== Best Comedy Actress ===
- **Angelica Panganiban (Banana Split / ABS-CBN 2)**
- Pokwang (Banana Split / ABS-CBN 2)
- Rufa Mae Quinto (Bubble Gang / GMA 7)
- Judy Ann Santos (George & Cecil / ABS-CBN 2)
- Nova Villa (Everybody Hapi / TV5)

=== Best Musical Variety Show ===
- **ASAP XV (ABS-CBN 2)**
- Party Pilipinas (GMA 7)
- Sharon (ABS-CBN 2)
- Walang Tulugan with the Master Showman (GMA 7)

=== Best Female TV Host ===
- Sarah Geronimo (ASAP XV / ABS-CBN 2)
- **Toni Gonzaga (ASAP XV / ABS-CBN 2)**
- Pia Guanio (Eat Bulaga / GMA 7)
- Pokwang (Wowowee / ABS-CBN 2)
- Lucy Torres (P.O.5 / TV5)
- Regine Velasquez (SOP Rules / GMA 7)

=== Best Male TV Host ===
- Ogie Alcasid (SOP Rules / GMA 7)
- Allan K. (Eat Bulaga / GMA 7)
- **Joey De Leon (Eat Bulaga / GMA 7)**
- Luis Manzano (ASAP XV / ABS-CBN 2)
- Martin Nievera (ASAP XV / ABS-CBN 2)
- Piolo Pascual (ASAP XV / ABS-CBN 2)
- Vic Sotto (Eat Bulaga / GMA 7)

=== Best Public Service Program ===
- **Bitag (UNTV 37)**
- Imbestigador (GMA 7)
- Reunions (Q 11)
- Wish Ko Lang (GMA 7)
- XXX: Exklusibong, Explosibong, Exposé (ABS-CBN 2)

=== Best Public Service Program Host ===
- Julius Babao, Henry Omaga-Diaz, and Pinky Webb (XXX: Exklusibong, Explosibong, Exposé / ABS-CBN 2)
- Mike Enriquez (Imbestigador / GMA 7)
- **Vicky Morales (Wish Ko Lang / GMA 7)**
- Jessica Soho (Reunions / Q 11)
- Ben Tulfo (Bitag / UNTV 37)

=== Best Horror-Fantasy Program ===
- Agimat Presents: Elias Paniki (ABS-CBN 2)
- **Agimat Presents: Pepeng Agimat (ABS-CBN 2)**
- Agimat Presents: Tiagong Akyat (ABS-CBN 2)
- Agimat Presents: Tonyong Bayawak (ABS-CBN 2)
- Midnight DJ (TV5)

=== Best Reality Program ===
- Day Off (Q 11)
- **Pinoy Records (GMA 7)**
- Totoo TV (TV5)

=== Best Reality Program Host ===
- **Toni Gonzaga (Pinoy Big Brother: Double Up / ABS-CBN 2)**
- Mike Nacua and Carmina Villarroel (Day Off / Q 11)
- Manny Pacquiao and Chris Tiu (Pinoy Records / GMA 7)
- Maverick Relova and Ariel Villasanta (Totoo TV / TV5)
- Mariel Rodriguez (Pinoy Big Brother: Double Up Uber / ABS-CBN 2)

=== Best Variety/Game Show ===
- Cool Center (GMA 7)
- Kitchen Battles (Q 11)
- Pilipinas, Game KNB? (ABS-CBN 2)
- P.O.5 (TV5)
- **Wowowee (ABS-CBN 2)**

=== Best Game Show Host ===
- Ogie Alcasid and Michael V. (Hole in the Wall / GMA 7)
- Bianca Gonzales (Pinoy Big Brother: Double Up Uplate / ABS-CBN 2)
- Richard Gomez (Family Feud / GMA 7)
- Edu Manzano (Pilipinas, Game KNB? / ABS-CBN 2)
- **Vic Sotto (Who Wants to Be a Millionaire / TV5)**

=== Best Talent Search Program ===
- Are You the Next Big Star? (GMA)
- Shall We Dance: The Celebrity Dance Challenge (TV5)
- **Showtime (ABS-CBN 2)**
- StarStruck V (GMA 7)
- Talentadong Pinoy (TV5)

=== Best Talent Search Program Host ===
- Ryan Agoncillo (Talentadong Pinoy / TV5)
- Ogie Alcasid and Regine Velasquez (Celebrity Duets Season 2 / GMA 7)
- Kim Atienza, Anne Curtis, Vhong Navarro and Vice Ganda (Showtime / ABS-CBN 2)
- **Billy Crawford and Luis Manzano (Pilipinas Got Talent / ABS-CBN 2)**
- Lucy Torres-Gomez (Shall We Dance: The Celebrity Dance Challenge / TV5)

=== Best Youth Oriented Program ===
- Ka-Blog! (GMA 7)
- **Lipgloss (TV5)**

=== Best Educational Program ===
- Born to Be Wild (GMA 7)
- Convergence (Net 25)
- **Matanglawin (ABS-CBN 2)**
- Math-Tinik (ABS-CBN 2)
- Quickfire (Q 11)

=== Best Educational Program Host ===
- **Kim Atienza (Matanglawin / ABS-CBN 2)**
- RJ Ledesma (Mathinik / ABS-CBN 2)
- Ferds Recio and Kiko Rustia (Born to Be Wild / GMA 7)
- Bong Revilla (Kap's Amazing Stories / GMA 7)
- Chris Tiu (Ripley's Believe It Or Not / GMA 7)

=== Best Celebrity Talk Show ===
- Full Time Moms (Q 11)
- Jojo A. All The Way (TV5)
- **Spoon (Net 25)**
- The Sweet Life (Q 11)
- Tonight with Arnold Clavio (Q 11)

=== Best Celebrity Talk Show Host ===
- Arnold Clavio (Tonight with Arnold Clavio / Q 11)
- **Janice de Belen (Spoon / Net 25)**
- Janice de Belen, Gelli de Belen and Carmina Villarroel (Sis / GMA 7)
- Wilma Doesnt and Lucy Torres-Gomez (The Sweet Life / Q 11)
- Christine Jacob and Susan Entrata (Full Time Moms / Q 11)

=== Best Documentary Program ===
- The Correspondents (ABS-CBN 2)
- Dokumentado (TV5)
- I Survived: Hindi Sumusuko Ang Pinoy (ABS-CBN 2)
- **I-Witness (GMA 7)**
- Reporter's Notebook (GMA 7)

=== Best Documentary Program Host ===
- **Sandra Aguinaldo, Kara David, Howie Severino and Jay Taruc (I-Witness / GMA 7)**
- Paolo Bediones (USI: Under Special Investigation / TV5)
- Karen Davila and Abner Mercado (The Correspondents / ABS-CBN 2)
- Jiggy Manicad and Maki Pulido (Reporter's Notebook / GMA 7)
- Ces Drilon (I Survived: Hindi Sumusuko Ang Pinoy / ABS-CBN 2)

=== Best Documentary Special ===
- **Planet Philippines (GMA 7)**
- Vilma: Woman for All Seasons (ABS-CBN 2)

=== Best Magazine Show ===
- **Kapuso Mo, Jessica Soho (GMA 7)**
- Mel & Joey (GMA 7)
- Moments (Net 25)
- Rated K (ABS-CBN 2)
- Wonder Mom (ABS-CBN 2)

=== Best Magazine Show Host ===
Karen Davila (Wonder Mom, ABS-CBN)

- Joey de Leon and Mel Tiangco (Mel and Joey / GMA 7)
- Gladys Reyes (Moments / Net 25)
- Korina Sanchez (Rated K / ABS-CBN 2)
- **Jessica Soho (Kapuso Mo, Jessica Soho / GMA 7)**

=== Best News Program ===
- 24 Oras (GMA 7)
- Bandila (ABS-CBN 2)
- Ito Ang Balita (UNTV 37)
- News Central (Studio 23)
- News on Q (Q 11)
- Saksi (GMA 7)
- Teledyaryo (NBN 4)
- **TV Patrol World (ABS-CBN 2)**

=== Best Male Newscaster ===
- **Julius Babao (TV Patrol World / ABS-CBN 2)**
- Arnold Clavio (Saksi / GMA 7)
- Mike Enriquez (24 Oras / GMA 7)
- Ted Failon (TV Patrol World / ABS-CBN 2)
- TJ Manotoc (News Central / Studio 23)
- Henry Omaga-Diaz (Bandila / ABS-CBN 2)
- **Daniel Razon (Ito Ang Balita / UNTV 37)**
- Alex Santos (TV Patrol Sabado and TV Patrol Linggo / ABS-CBN 2)

=== Best Female Newscaster ===
- **Karen Davila (TV Patrol World / ABS-CBN 2)**
- Angelique Lazo (Teledyaryo / NBN 4)
- Ces Drilon (Bandila / ABS-CBN 2)
- Vicky Morales (Saksi / GMA 7)
- Bernadette Sembrano (TV Patrol Sabado and TV Patrol Linggo / ABS-CBN 2)
- Mel Tiangco (24 Oras / GMA 7)

=== Best Morning Show ===
- **Good Morning Kuya (UNTV 37)**
- Home Page (Net 25)
- The Morning Show (NBN 4)
- **Umagang Kay Ganda (ABS-CBN 2)**
- Unang Hirit (GMA 7)

=== Best Morning Show Host ===
- **Kim Atienza, Atom Araullo, Winnie Cordero, Ginger Conejero, Rica Peralejo, Donita Rose, Alex Santos, Bernadette Sembrano, Anthony Taberna and Pinky Webb (Umagang Kay Ganda / ABS-CBN 2)**
- Aljo Bendijo and Veronica Baluyut-Jimenez (The Morning Show / NBN 4)
- Weng dela Fuente, Eunice Mariño and Onin Miranda (Home Page / Net 25)
- Drew Arellano, Lyn Ching-Pascual, Arnold Clavio, Susie Entrata-Abrera, Lhar Santiago and Rhea Santos (Unang Hirit / GMA 7)
- Daniel Razon (Good Morning Kuya / UNTV 37)

=== Best Public Affairs Program ===
- **The Bottomline with Boy Abunda (ABS-CBN 2)**
- Get It Straight with Daniel Razon (UNTV 37)
- Probe Profiles (ABS-CBN 2)
- Y Speak (Studio 23)

=== Best Public Affairs Program Host ===
- **Boy Abunda (The Bottomline with Boy Abunda / ABS-CBN 2)**
- Bianca Gonzales (Y Speak / Studio 23)
- Cheche Lazaro (Probe Profiles / ABS-CBN 2)
- Daniel Razon (Get It Straight / UNTV 37)

=== Best Showbiz Oriented Talk Show ===
- **The Buzz (ABS-CBN 2)**
- E-Live (ABS-CBN 2)
- Juicy! (TV5)
- Showbiz Central (GMA 7)
- SNN: Showbiz News Ngayon (ABS-CBN 2)
- Startalk (GMA 7)

=== Best Male Showbiz Oriented Talk Show Host ===
- **Boy Abunda (SNN: Showbiz News Ngayon / ABS-CBN 2)**
- Joey de Leon (Startalk / GMA 7)
- Raymond Gutierrez (Showbiz Central / GMA 7)
- Luis Manzano (Entertainment Live / ABS-CBN 2)
- Tim Yap (Tweetbiz, Q11)

=== Best Female Showbiz Oriented Talk Show Host ===
- Kris Aquino (The Buzz / ABS-CBN 2)
- Cristy Fermin (Juicy, TV5)
- Toni Gonzaga (Entertainment Live / ABS-CBN 2)
- **Bianca Gonzales (Entertainment Live / ABS-CBN 2)**
- Pia Guanio (Showbiz Central / GMA 7)

=== Best Children Show ===
- Art Angel (GMA 7)
- Batang Bibbo (GMA 7)
- **Happy Land (GMA 7)**
- Kulilits (ABS-CBN 2)
- Tropang Potchi (Q 11)

=== Best Children Show Host ===
- **Love Añover and Patricia Gayod (Happy Land / GMA 7)**
- Pia Arcangel (Art Angel / GMA 7)
- Roxanne Barcelo (Batang Bibbo / GMA 7)
- Bugoy Cariño and Chacha Cañete (Kulilits / ABS-CBN 2)
- Ella Cruz, Sabrina Man and Julian Trono (Tropang Potchi / Q 11)

=== Best Travel Show ===
- **Balik-Bayan (Q 11)**
- Bread Tambayan (UNTV 37)
- Biyaheng Langit (IBC 13)
- Trip na Trip (ABS-CBN 2)

=== Best Travel Show Host ===
- **Drew Arellano (Balik-Bayan / Q 11)**
- Katherine de Castro, Kian Kazemi and Uma Khouny (Trip na Trip / ABS-CBN 2)
- Jack de Ocampo, Adam Maderal, Karen Santos, Madel Sulit and Manuel Tanaotanao (Bread N' Butter / UNTV 37)
- Rey Langit (Biyaheng Langit / IBC 13)

=== Best Lifestyle Show ===
- Kay Susan Tayo (GMA 7)
- Life and Style (Q 11)
- Urban Zone (ABS-CBN 2)
- **Us Girls (Studio 23)**
- X-Life (Q 11)

=== Best Lifestyle Show Host ===
- Angel Aquino, Iya Villania and Cheska Garcia (Us Girls / Studio 23)
- Gino dela Pena, Steph Henares and JC Tiuseco (X-Life / Q 11)
- Susan Enriquez (Kay Susan Tayo/ GMA 7)
- Daphne Oseña-Paez (Urban Zone / ABS-CBN 2)
- **Ricky Reyes (Life and Style / Q 11)**

== Special awards ==
=== Ading Fernando Lifetime Achievement Awardee ===
- Antonio Tuviera

=== Excellence in Broadcasting Awardee ===
- Che Che Lazaro

=== Celebrity Faces of the Night ===
- JC de Vera (Male)
- Ruffa Gutierrez (Female)

=== Faces of the Night ===
- Kean Kazemi (Male)
- Nikki Gil (Female)

=== Stars of the Night ===
- Luis Manzano (Male)
- Miriam Quiambao (Female)

== See also ==
- PMPC Star Awards for TV
