= Samonte =

Samonte may refer to

- Santo Antônio do Monte, a municipality in Brazil
- Nadine Samonte (born 1988), Filipina actress and model
- Nikki Samonte (born 2000), Filipina actress, singer and model
- Samonte Cruz, Filipinx goldsmith and artist
