= Sabrina Man =

Filipino actress (born 2000)

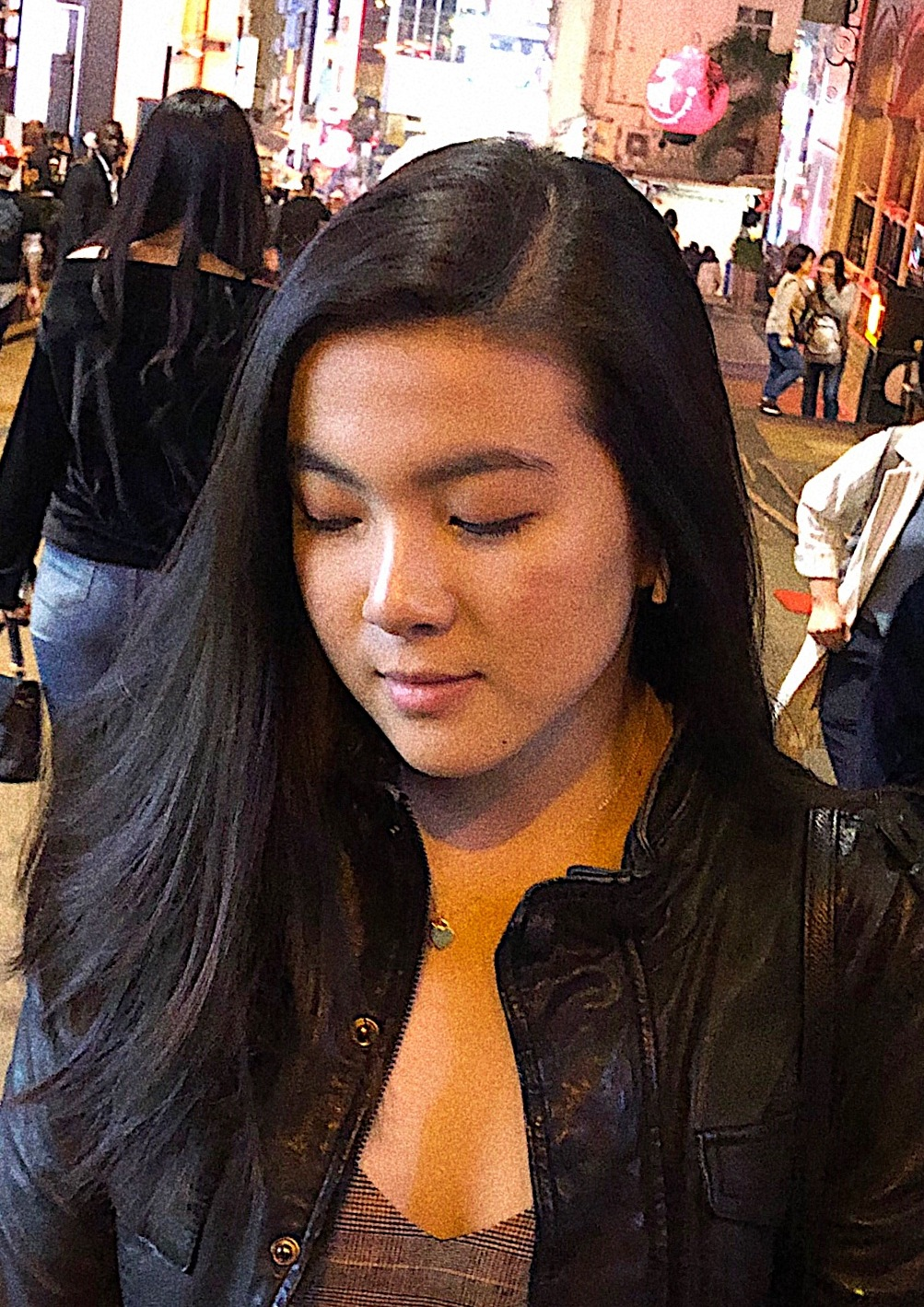
- Man in 2018
- Born: March 12, 2000 (age 25); Hong Kong
- Occupations: Actress; television host; commercial model
- Years active: 2007–2015

Sabrina Man (born March 12, 2000) is a Filipino actress. She was Little Miss Laguna 2007 and the first Little Earth Angel-Air (young counterparts of Miss Philippines Earth). She has starred in several independent films. She won her first best actress award in UP Short Film Festival for the film entitled Pers Lab.

She started her show business career in Princess Sarah in 2007. She also regularly appeared on Umbrella Friend, a local TV show in Laguna. She was first recognized as young Serpina in the 2009 TV series Darna. She was chosen for the main cast in the GMA prime time series telefantasya Panday Kids. She was one of the hosts of Tropang Potchi aired on GMA TV.

== Career ==
Man started out as a child actress of GMA Network after she was discovered after winning Little Miss Laguna. One of her earliest roles was as Young Serpina in the 2009 television series Darna, where she got to work with Marian Rivera and Buboy Villar. She was also one of the hosts of the children's variety and game show Tropang Potchi alongside Ella Cruz, Julian Trono, Bianca Umali and many others. They were awarded as the Best Children's Show Hosts during the 28th Star Awards in 2014. In 2010, she got to star with Villar and Trono in the telefantasya Panday Kids. She also hosted Zooperstars that year with Trono and Gelli de Belen. Later that year, she got to join Rivera's superhero-fantasy comedy Super Inday and the Golden Bibe.

In 2015, Man had one of her major roles as a teen in Once Upon A Kiss as an antagonist to the main leads played by Bianca Umali and Miguel Tanfelix.

== Personal life ==
Man is of Filipino-Chinese descent, and she was born in Hong Kong. She moved back there with her family in 2015, where she graduated from high school in 2019.

== Filmography ==
=== Film ===
Year	Title	Role
2008	Shake, Rattle & Roll 10	Kid 1
2008	Huling Pasada	Gabriela
2008	Padyak	Charrie
2009	Shake, Rattle & Roll 11	Young Claire
2009	Yaya and Angelina: The Spoiled Brat Movie	Tanya
2010	Super Inday and The Golden Bibe	Jinky
2010	Mano Po 6: A Mother's Love	Young Jin Feng
2011	My House Husband: Ikaw Na!	Kaye
2012	Tahanan	Kyla
2012	Ang Nawawala	Promise

=== Television ===
Year	Title	Role
2008	Luna Mystika	Young Donita
2009	Tropang Potchi	Herself
2009	Darna	Young Serpina
2010	Zooperstars	Herself
2010	Ina, Kasusuklaman Ba Kita?	Young Katrina
2010	Panday Kids	Charlie
2010	Pidol's Wonderland (Mariposang Gala)	Gala
2010	Pidol's Wonderland (Rica Puno)	Rica
2010	Pidol's Wonderland (Makulay na Balabal ni Josie)	Josie
2010	Claudine	Isay
2011	Blusang Itim	Young Jessa
2011	Bantatay	Princess
2012	Manny Many Prizes	Herself/Guest
2012	Alice Bungisngis and Her Wonder Walis	Carol
2013	Tropang Potchi	Herself
2013	Magpakailanman: The Nil Nodalo Story	Young Nil
2013	Magpakailanman: Bullying	
2014	Maynila	
2015	Once Upon a Kiss	Wendy Salazar

== Commercial ==
Year	Title	Role	Notes
2007	Memory Plus	Herself	
2008	Bear Brand Success	Herself	
2008	Bear Brand Laki sa Gatas	Herself	
2008	SkyCable	Herself	
2008	Surf	Herself	
2011	Tang	Herself	
