= Panday Kids =

2010 Philippine television drama series

- Title card
- Genre: Fantasy drama
- Developed by: Suzette Doctolero
- Written by: Suzette Doctolero; Richard Cruz; Kit Villanueva-Langit; Jules Dan Katanyag
- Directed by: Mike Tuviera; Dominic Zapata
- Starring: Sabrina Man; Buboy Villar; Julian Trono
- Theme music composer: Chito Miranda
- Opening theme: "Panday Kids" by Parokya ni Edgar
- Ending theme: "Sana" by Buboy Villar
- Country of origin: Philippines
- Original language: Tagalog
- No. of episodes: 72

Production
- Executive producer: Helen Rose S. Sese
- Camera setup: Multiple-camera setup
- Running time: 30–45 minutes
- Production company: GMA Entertainment TV

Original release
- Network: GMA Network
- Release: February 22 – June 4, 2010

Related
- Ang Panday

Panday Kids (transl. blacksmith kids) is a 2010 Philippine television drama fantasy series broadcast by GMA Network. The series is a television sequel to the 2009 film, Ang Panday. Directed by Mike Tuviera and Dominic Zapata, it stars Sabrina Man, Buboy Villar and Julian Trono. It premiered on February 22, 2010 on the network's Telebabad line up. The series concluded on June 4, 2010, with a total of 72 episodes.

== Cast and characters ==
Cast

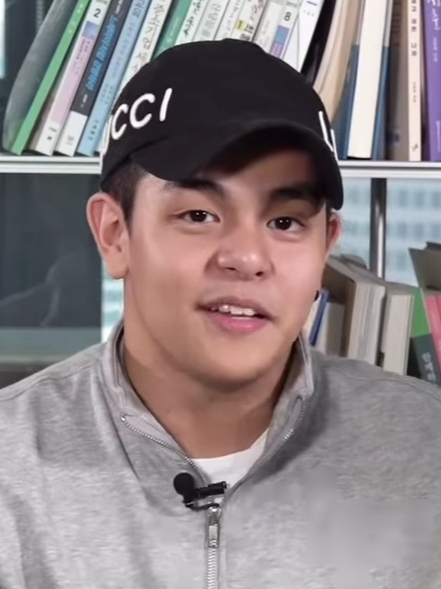
Julian Trono

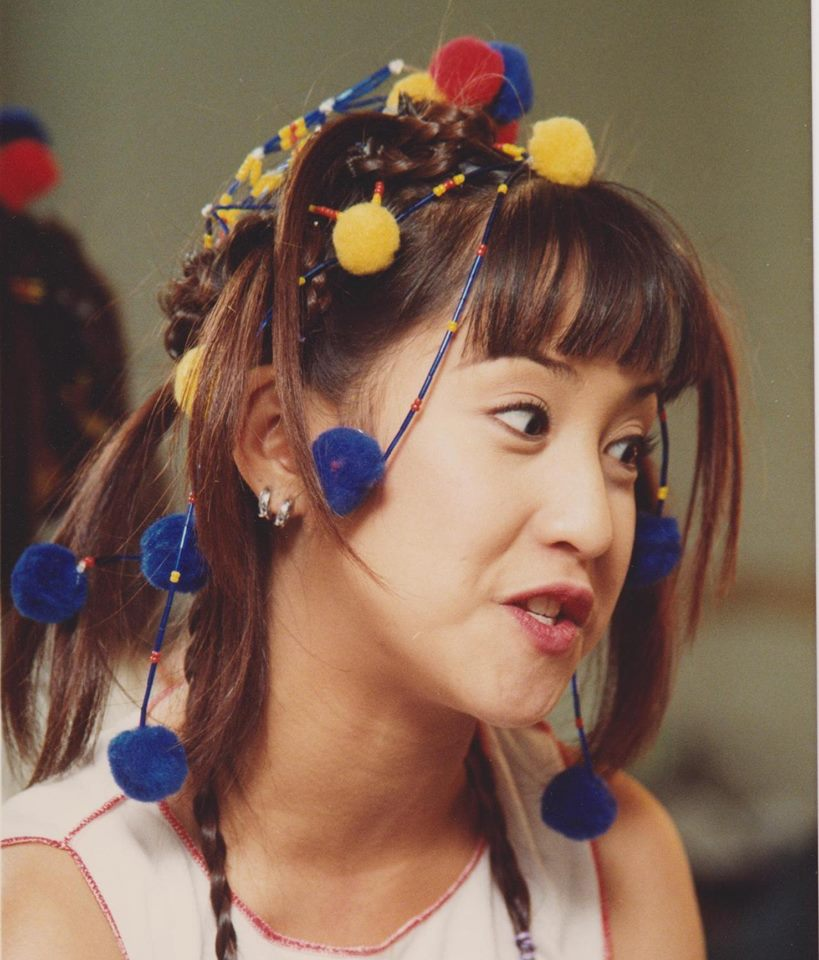
Jolina Magdangal

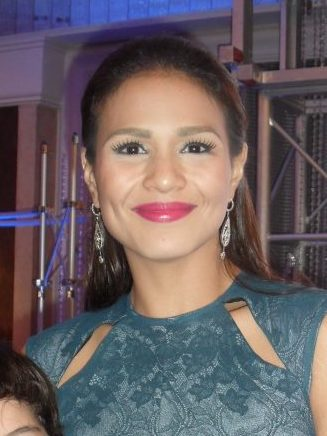
Iza Calzado

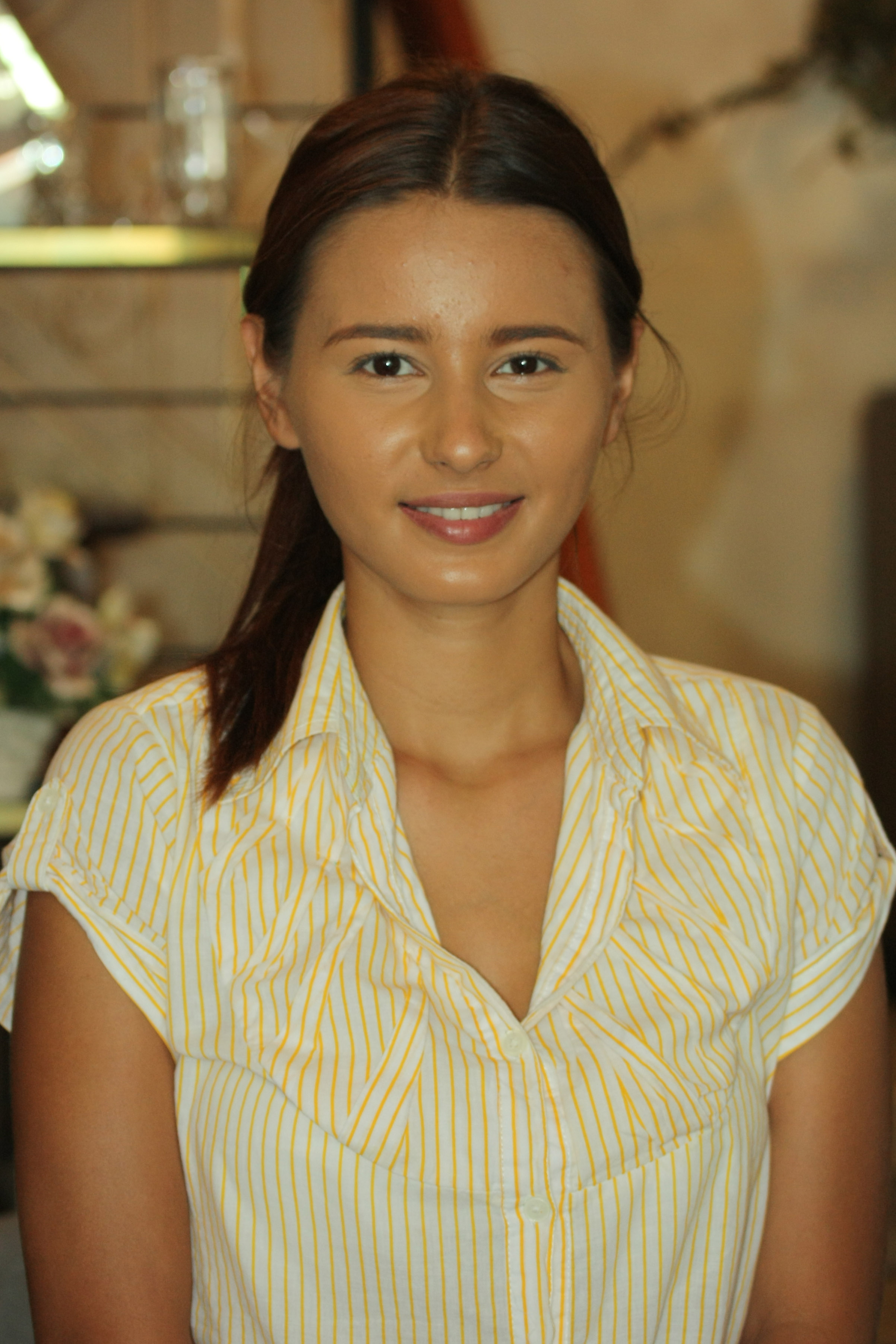
Jackie Rice

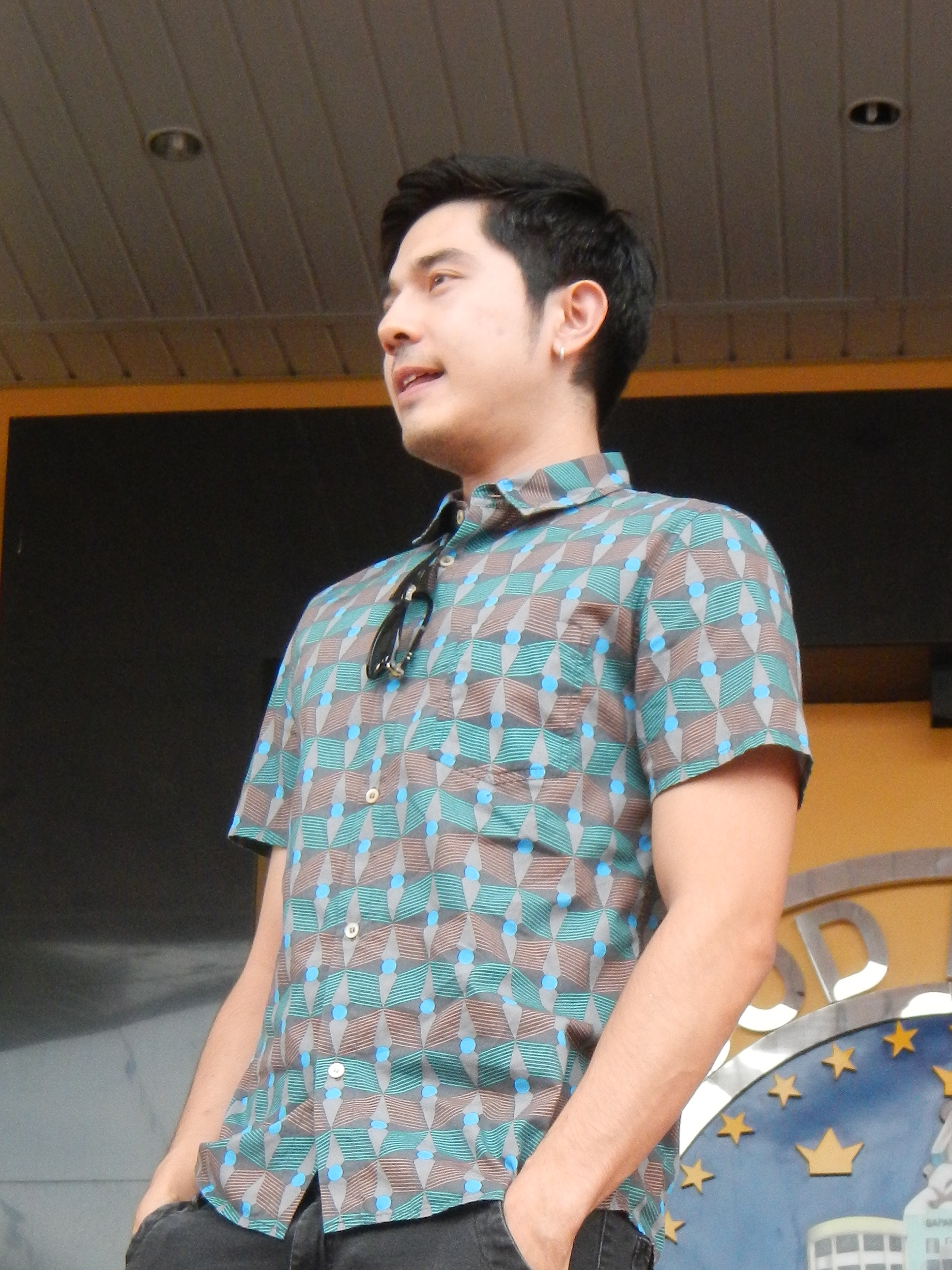
Paulo Avelino

Lead cast

- Buboy Villar as Oliver
- Julian Trono as Hadji
- Sabrina Man as Charlie

Supporting cast

- Jolina Magdangal as Ola
- Marvin Agustin as Lizardo
- Iza Calzado as Maria Makiling
- Gelli de Belen as Rosanna
- Ryan Eigenmann as Andreas
- Marissa Delgado as Guada Salcedo
- Pen Medina as Tasyo
- Nanette Inventor as Fidela
- Jose Manalo as Mambo
- Polo Ravales as Cicero
- Danilo Barrios as Areas
- Paulo Avelino as Alfred / Aureus
- Ella Cruz as Jenny
- Jackie Rice as Jana / Sarah
- Rich Asuncion as Fatima
- Akihiro Sato as Oswaldo / Kakak
- Nikki Samonte as Wendy
- Yogo Singh as Makoy
- Miggy Jimenez as Sintoy
- Franchesca Salcedo as Marva

Recurring cast

- Ama Quiambao as older Maria Makiling
- Paolo Paraiso as Ruben
- Miguel Tanfelix as Orix
- Rob Sy as Oxo
- Jan Manual as Hamogo
- Lian Paz as Cecilia
- Gabriel Roxas as Butchoy
- Isabel Granada as Tessa
- Bernard Palanca as James Villafuerte

Guest cast

- Angelika Dela Cruz as Ester
- Tirso Cruz III as Augusto Luna
- Katrina Halili as Wenoa
- Sheena Halili as Oxana
- Carlo Aquino as Elvin
- Marti San Juan
- John Carlo Tan
- Nathalie Hart as Luningning
- Gerard Pizarras as Diego
- Jomari Yllana as Flavio
- Christopher de Leon as a teacher
- JC de Vera as Aureus

== Ratings ==
According to AGB Nielsen Philippines' Mega Manila household television ratings, the pilot episode of Panday Kids earned a 34.8% rating. The final episode scored a 16.5% rating.

== Accolades ==
Accolades received by Panday Kids
| Year | Award | Category | Recipient | Result | Ref. |
|---|---|---|---|---|---|
| 2010 | 24th PMPC Star Awards for Television | Best New Male TV Personality | Julian Trono | Nominated | |
| 2010 | 24th PMPC Star Awards for Television | Best New Female TV Personality | Sabrina Man | Nominated | |
