= Bayarán =

- Directed by: Francis Posadas
- Screenplay by: Jerry Gracio
- Story by: Jerry Gracio
- Produced by: Danilo M. Custodio
- Starring: Maricar de Mesa; Carlos Morales; Jay Manalo
- Cinematography: Ver Dauz
- Edited by: Ferren Salumbides
- Music by: Jaime Fabregas
- Production companies: Wild World Entertainment Co., Inc.
- Distributed by: Keyser Mercantile
- Release date: May 7, 2003
- Running time: 105 minutes
- Country: Philippines
- Language: Filipino

Bayarán (English: Payment) is a 2003 Filipino action drama film directed by Francis Posadas. Written by Jerry Gracio, the film introduces Jay Manalo as the deaf-mute hired killer protagonist, Jake.

== Plot ==
Jake, a speech-impaired expert marksman meets Rizza, a high class escort and mistress of a syndicate crime boss. As soon as they fall in love, they become targets of a mob crime syndicate whom they worked for, chasing them in a ruthless pursuit.

== Cast ==
- Jay Manalo as Jake
- Maricar de Mesa as Rizza
- Carlos Morales as Spike
- Kristel Venecia as Millet
- Daria Ramirez as Aling Melay
- Ricardo Cepeda as Bogart
- John Apacible as Douglas
- Trishia Jacob as Yvonne
- Ruby Europa as Ruby
- Cloyd Robinson as Mama Cita
- Jess Sanchez as James
- Archie Adamos as Mr. Ramos
- Robert Miller as Pusher
- Michael Anthony Cesar as Buyer
- Mar Mendez as Bouncer
- Simon Pulmano as Young Jake
- Aaron Rodran as Teenager Jake
- Tita Swarding as Mama

== Production ==
The post-production facilities were made at Sampaguita Studio, while the titles are made at A & J Concepts. The film was shot at Angono, Rizal, Baguio, Binangonan, Caloocan, Imus and Manila.

== Awards ==
On the 2004 FAMAS Awards, the film has received the Best Actor for Jay Manalo.

== Reception ==
As of February 9, 2017, the film held a score of 5,0 out of 10 from the users at the Internet Movie Database.
