= Maricar de Mesa =

Filipino actress

- Born: November 3, 1979 (age 46); Manila, Philippines
- Occupations: Actress, host (GoBingo; 1996-1999 as the first GobiGirl with Arnell Ignacio)
- Years active: 1995–present
- Spouse: Don Allado (m. 2006; ann. 2014)
- Children: 1

Maricar de Mesa (born November 3, 1979) is a Filipino actress known for her antagonistic roles in many TV series like Magkaibang Mundo, Villa Quintana, Once Upon a Kiss, Dragon Lady, Unica Hija and others. She started her career in Bubble Gang, as well as the first GobiGirl of Arnell Ignacio in GoBingo from 1996 to 1999.

== Personal life ==
She was married to basketball player Don Allado, but separated after two years. She has a child named Baby Allianna Sky.

== Filmography ==
=== Film ===
Year	Title	Role	Notes
2002	Buko Pandan	Bining	
2003	Nympha	Nympha	
2003	Bayarán	Rizza	
2005	Terrorist Hunter		
2010	In Your Eyes	Barbara	
2013	Bromance: My Brother's Romance	Joyce San Juan	
2013	Bekikang: Ang Nanay Kong Beki	Mariana	Supporting role
2014	My Big Bossing	Princesa Marga	"Prinsesa" segment
2022	Yorme: The Isko Domagoso Story	Shirley Fuentes	

=== Television ===
Year	Title	Role
1995–2000	Bubble Gang	Herself
1996–1999	GoBingo	Herself
1999	Di Ba't Ikaw	Carla
2001–2003	Sana ay Ikaw na Nga	Olga Villavicer / Vanessa Del Rio / Samantha Aguirre
2003–2004	Basta't Kasama Kita	Lyra Manuel
2007–2008	Prinsesa ng Banyera	Lilibeth
2008–2009	Dyosa	Calliope Makiling
2009–2010	Dahil May Isang Ikaw	Atty. Juliana Serrano
2010	Habang May Buhay	Dra. Pamintuan
2010	Rosalka	Cynthia Dominguez
2010	Magkaribal	Young Betsy
2011	Sisid	Perla
2011–2012	Ikaw Lang ang Mamahalin	Helena
2012	Wako Wako	Bechay
2012	Sana ay Ikaw na Nga	Bernadette Zalameda
2012–2013	Kahit Puso'y Masugatan	Melanie Espiritu
2013–2014	Villa Quintana	Stella Mendiola-Quintana
2014	Imbestigador	Various
2015	Once Upon a Kiss	Ursula Salazar
2016	Magkaibang Mundo	Criselda Dizon
2017	Ipaglaban Mo: Abuso	Marianette "Anette" Dimasupil
2017–2018	Pusong Ligaw	Amanda Yulo
2018	Kambal, Karibal	Valerie Olivar
2019	Dragon Lady	Vera Lim
2020	Tadhana: Magkano ang Forever?	Carla
2020	Ipaglaban Mo: Ninong	Ruth
2021	Legal Wives	Zobaida Almahdi
2022	Mano Po Legacy: Her Big Boss	Mia Flores
2022–2023	Unica Hija	Lorna Marasigan
2023	Luv Is: Love at First Read	Mayumi "Yumi" Calan-De Makapili
2023	Pinoy Crime Stories	Various roles
2024	My Guardian Alien	Young Nova
2024	It's Showtime	Herself
2024	Maka	Tonette
2025	Cruz vs. Cruz	Claire
2026	Tadhana: Tunay na Misis Solis	Fe
2026	Magpakailanman:Ang Katatagan ng Isang Ina (The Salome Avila Story)	Joan
2026	Magpakailanman: Mana sa Ina	Delia
2026	Tadhana: Finding Hope	Vivian Montenegro
2026	Wish Ko Lang! Specials: Online Sugal	Sabrina
2026–present	Delivery Boi	Yvette Aldomovar
