= List of Once Upon a Kiss episodes =

Once Upon a Kiss is a 2015 Philippine television drama romantic series broadcast by GMA Network. It premiered on the network's Telebabad line up from January 5, 2015 to May 1, 2015, replacing Strawberry Lane.

Mega Manila ratings are provided by AGB Nielsen Philippines.

== Series overview ==
Month	Episodes	Monthly Averages
Month	Episodes	Mega Manila
January 2015	20	19.7%
February 2015	20	18.8%
March 2015	22	20.8%
April 2015	20	21.1%
May 2015	1	23.2%
Total	83	20.7%

== Episodes ==
=== January 2015 ===
Episode		Original air date	Social Media Hashtag	AGB Nielsen Mega Manila Households in Television Homes			Ref.
Episode		Original air date	Social Media Hashtag	Rating	Timeslot Rank	Primetime Rank	Ref.
1	Pilot	January 5, 2015	#OnceUponAKiss	19.8%	#2	#4	
2	Clash of Two Families	January 6, 2015	#ClashOfTwoFamilies	20.6%	#1	#1	
3	Two Friends Apart	January 7, 2015	#TwoFriendsApart	18.9%	#2	#3	
4	Ella Remembers Prince	January 8, 2015	#OUAKEllaRemembersPrince	21.8%	#1	#1	
5	First Kiss	January 9, 2015	#OUAKFirstKiss	18.8%	#1	#4	
6	Bittersweet Reunion	January 12, 2015	#OUAKBittersweetReunion	22.6%	#1	#1	
7	Frenemies	January 13, 2015	#OUAKFrenemies	21.6%	#1	#3	
8	Prince to the Rescue	January 14, 2015	#OUAKPrinceToTheRescue	20.2%	#1	#3	
9	Justice for Aurora	January 15, 2015	#OUAKJusticeForAurora	21.2%	#1	#3	
10	Prince Defends Ella	January 16, 2015	#OUAKPrinceDefendsElla	16.8%	#1	#4	
11	The Sleeping Prince	January 19, 2015	#OUAKTheSleepingPrince	20.2%	#1	#4	
12	Ella Goes to Manila	January 20, 2015	#OUAKEllaGoesToManila	20.0%	#2	#5	
13	Wake up, Prince	January 21, 2015	#OUAKWakeUpPrince	17.1%	#1	#5	
14	Magical Dream	January 22, 2015	#OUAKMagicalDream	20.5%	#1	#2	
15	Fate of Two Friends	January 23, 2015	#OUAKFateOfTwoFriends	18.9%	#2	#3	
16	Hopeful Ella	January 26, 2015	#OUAKHopefulElla	18.4%	#2	#6	
17	Ella Kisses Prince	January 27, 2015	#OUAKEllaKissesPrince	18.1%	#2	#5	
18	Joyful Day	January 28, 2015	#OUAKJoyfulDay	19.6%	#1	#4	
19	Grateful Prince	January 29, 2015	#OUAKGratefulPrince	20.8%	#1	#3	
20	The Sign	January 30, 2015	#OUAKTheSign	18.8%	#2	#4	

=== February 2015 ===
Episode		Original air date	Social Media Hashtag	AGB Nielsen Mega Manila Households in Television Homes			Ref.
Episode		Original air date	Social Media Hashtag	Rating	Timeslot Rank	Primetime Rank	Ref.
21	Saving the Friendship	February 2, 2015	#OUAKSavingTheFriendship	19.1%	#1	#3	
22	Fight, Prince!	February 3, 2015	#OUAKFightPrince	18.6%	#2	#4	
23	Romantic Prince	February 4, 2015	#OUAKRomanticPrince	18.9%	#2	#5	
24	First Dance	February 5, 2015	#OUAKFirstDance	19.1%	#2	#5	
25	Good Vibes	February 6, 2015	#OUAKGoodVibes	18.6%	#2	#4	
26	New Hope	February 9, 2015	#OUAKNewHope	18.4%	#2	#6	
27	Smitten Prince	February 10, 2015	#OUAKSmittenPrince	20.3%	#2	#3	
28	Closer Together	February 11, 2015	#OUAKCloserTogether	19.5%	#2	#4	
29	Wish Granted	February 12, 2015	#OUAKWishGranted	21.0%	#2	#3	
30	Aurora Approves Prince	February 13, 2015	#OUAKAuroraApprovesPrince	19.0%	#2	#4	
31	Friends at Work	February 16, 2015	#OUAKFriendsAtWork	19.4%	#2	#6	
32	BFFs	February 17, 2015	#OUAKBFFs	18.6%	#2	#5	
33	Troubled Day	February 18, 2015	#OUAKTroubledDay	17.1%	#2	#8	
34	Stronger Together	February 19, 2015	#OUAKStrongerTogether	18.3%	#2	#7	
35	One Romantic Day	February 20, 2015	#OUAKOneRomanticDay	17.9%	#2	#6	
36	True Love Waits	February 23, 2015	#OUAKTrueLoveWaits	18.2%	#2	#6	
37	King's Invitation	February 24, 2015	#OUAKKingsInvitation	19.3%	#2	#5	
38	Servants Uniform	February 25, 2015	#OUAKServantsUniform	19.2%	#2	#4	
39	Prince Rescues Ella	February 26, 2015	#OUAKPrinceRescuesElla	18.0%	#2	#5	
40	Sweet Farewell	February 27, 2015	#OUAKSweetFarewell	18.4%	#2	#4	

=== March 2015 ===
Episode		Original air date	Social Media Hashtag	AGB Nielsen Mega Manila Households in Television Homes			Ref.
Episode		Original air date	Social Media Hashtag	Rating	Timeslot Rank	Primetime Rank	Ref.
41	Precious Moments	March 2, 2015	#OUAKPreciousMoments	17.9%	#2	#7	
42	No Goodbyes	March 3, 2015	#OUAKNoGoodbyes	18.2%	#2	#6	
43	Summer is Over	March 4, 2015	#OUAKSummerIsOver	18.3%	#2	#5	
44	Dealing With Changes	March 5, 2015	#OUAKDealingWithChanges	18.5%	#2	#5	
45	Thankful Hearts	March 6, 2015	#OUAKThankfulHearts	20.9%	#2	#3	
46	Ella in Manila	March 9, 2015	#OUAKEllaInManila	20.5%	#2	#4	
47	Meeting in St. Patricks	March 10, 2015	#OUAKMeetingInStPatricks	21.5%	#2	#3	
48	Newbie Ella	March 11, 2015	#OUAKNewbieElla	21.3%	#2	#3	
49	Finding Ella	March 12, 2015	#OUAKFindingElla	21.8%	#2	#4	
50	Reunited	March 13, 2015	#OUAKReunited	21.3%	#2	#3	
51	Prince vs. John	March 16, 2015	#OUAKPrinceVsJohn	23.1%	#2	#3	
52	Staying Focused	March 17, 2015	#OUAKStayingFocused	20.5%	#2	#3	
53	Never Give Up	March 18, 2015	#OUAKNeverGiveUp	21.1%	#2	#3	
54	The Truth	March 19, 2015	#OUAKTheTruth	21.6%	#2	#2	
55	Think Positive	March 20, 2015	#OUAKThinkPositive	22.4%	#1	#1	
56	Team Good Vibes	March 23, 2015	#OUAKTeamGoodVibes	22.1%	#2	#3	
57	Heart Strong Ella	March 24, 2015	#OUAKHeartStrongElla	22.1%	#2	#3	
58	Brave Ella	March 25, 2015	#OUAKBraveElla	19.9%	#2	#6	
59	Fighting Spirit	March 26, 2015	#OUAKFightingSpirit	19.2%	#2	#7	
60	Staying Positive	March 27, 2015	#OUAKStayingPositive	21.5%	#2	#2	
61	By Your Side	March 30, 2015	#OUAKByYourSide	21.8%	#2	#3	
62	Braving Difficulties	March 31, 2015	#OUAKBravingDifficulties	21.6%	#2	#3	

=== April 2015 ===
Episode		Original air date	Social Media Hashtag	AGB Nielsen Mega Manila Households in Television Homes			Ref.
Episode		Original air date	Social Media Hashtag	Rating	Timeslot Rank	Primetime Rank	Ref.
63	A New Chapter	April 1, 2015	#OUAKANewChapter	20.4%	#1	#4	
64	Hope for Ella	April 6, 2015	#OUAKHopeForElla	19.1%	#2	#5	
65	Love Finds a Way	April 7, 2015	#OUAKLoveFindsAWay	20.6%	#2	#4	
66	A Mother's Pain	April 8, 2015	#OUAKAMothersPain	20.6%	#2	#3	
67	The Deal	April 9, 2015	#OUAKTheDeal	18.5%	#1	#4	
68	Ella Recovers	April 10, 2015	#OUAKEllaRecovers	20.1%	#1	#2	
69	Keeping the Deal	April 13, 2015	#OUAKKeepingTheDeal	23.0%	#1	#2	
70	Friendship Over	April 14, 2015	#OUAKFriendshipOver	23.1%	#1	#2	
71	The Jealous Prince	April 15, 2015	#OUAKTheJealousPrince	21.2%	#1	#1	
72	Missing Each Other	April 16, 2015	#OUAKMissingEachOther	20.9%	#2	#3	
73	Worthy Sacrifice	April 17, 2015	#OUAKWorthySacrifice	21.1%	#1	#1	
74	Choosing Happiness	April 20, 2015	#OUAKChoosingHappiness	20.3%	#2	#2	
75	Saving Prince	April 21, 2015	#OUAKSavingPrince	21.6%	#2	#3	
76	Together Again	April 22, 2015	#OUAKTogetherAgain	20.1%	#1	#2	
77	Reunited at Last	April 23, 2015	#OUAKReunitedAtLast	23.1%	#1	#1	
78	Better Days Ahead	April 24, 2015	#OUAKBetterDaysAhead	22.5%	#1	#1	
79	Bridging Gaps	April 27, 2015	#OUAKBridgingGaps	21.3%	#1	#2	
80	The Kiss	April 28, 2015	#OUAKTheKiss	23.2%	#1	#2	
81	Forgiveness and Love	April 29, 2015	#OUAKForgivenessAndLove	19.3%	#1	#3	
82	Prom to Remember	April 30, 2015	#OUAKPromToRemember	21.5%	#1	#2	

=== May 2015 ===
Episode		Original air date	Social Media Hashtag	AGB Nielsen Mega Manila Households in Television Homes			Ref.
Episode		Original air date	Social Media Hashtag	Rating	Timeslot Rank	Primetime Rank	Ref.
83	Happy Ever After	May 1, 2015	#OUAKHappyEverAfter	23.2%	#1	#1	
