= Legal Wives =

2021 Philippine television drama series

- Title card
- Genre: Romantic drama
- Created by: Suzette Doctolero
- Written by: Suzette Doctolero; Brylle Tabora; Jaymee Katanyag; Marlon Miguel
- Directed by: Zig Dulay
- Creative director: Aloy Adlawan
- Starring: Dennis Trillo; Alice Dixson; Andrea Torres; Bianca Umali
- Theme music composer: Rina L. Mercado
- Opening theme: "Pagmamahal Mo Lang" by Hannah Precillas
- Country of origin: Philippines
- Original language: Tagalog
- No. of episodes: 80 (list of episodes)

Production
- Executive producer: Shielyn M. Atienza
- Production locations: Laguna, Philippines
- Cinematography: Mark Joseph Cosico
- Editors: Mikie Donald Robles; Julius James Castillo; Robert Pancho; Mark Oliver Sison; Gervic Estella
- Camera setup: Multiple-camera setup
- Running time: 22–41 minutes
- Production company: GMA Entertainment Group

Original release
- Network: GMA Network
- Release: July 26 – November 12, 2021

Legal Wives is a 2021 Philippine television drama romance series broadcast by GMA Network. Directed by Zig Dulay, it stars Dennis Trillo, Alice Dixson, Andrea Torres and Bianca Umali. It premiered on July 26, 2021 on the network's Telebabad line up. The series concluded on November 12, 2021, with a total of 80 episodes.

The series is streaming online on YouTube.

== Premise ==
Legal Wives features a story of a Maranao Muslim royalty and the lead character's relationship with three wives.

== Cast and characters ==
Cast

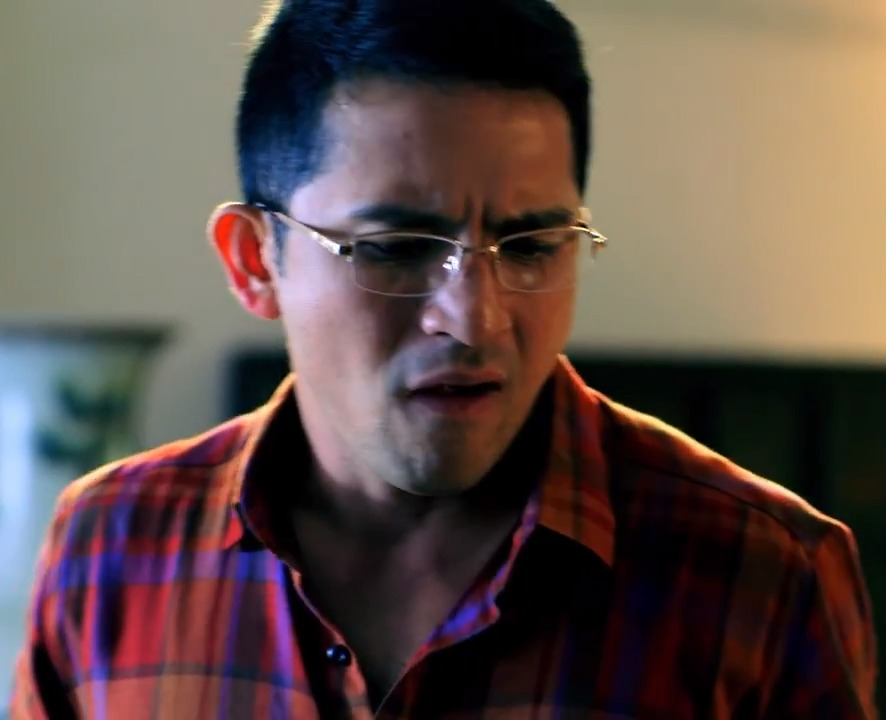
Dennis Trillo

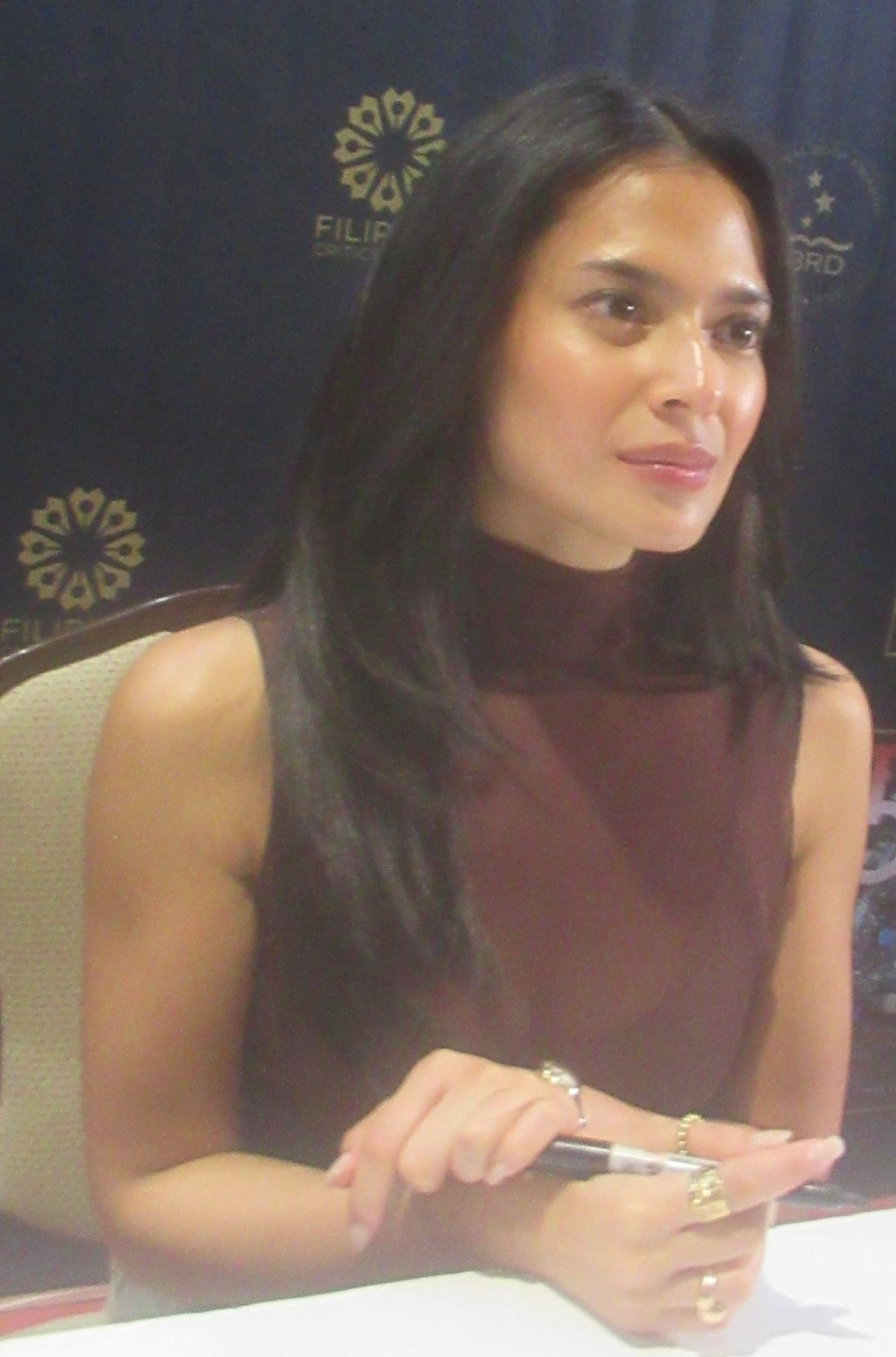
Bianca Umali

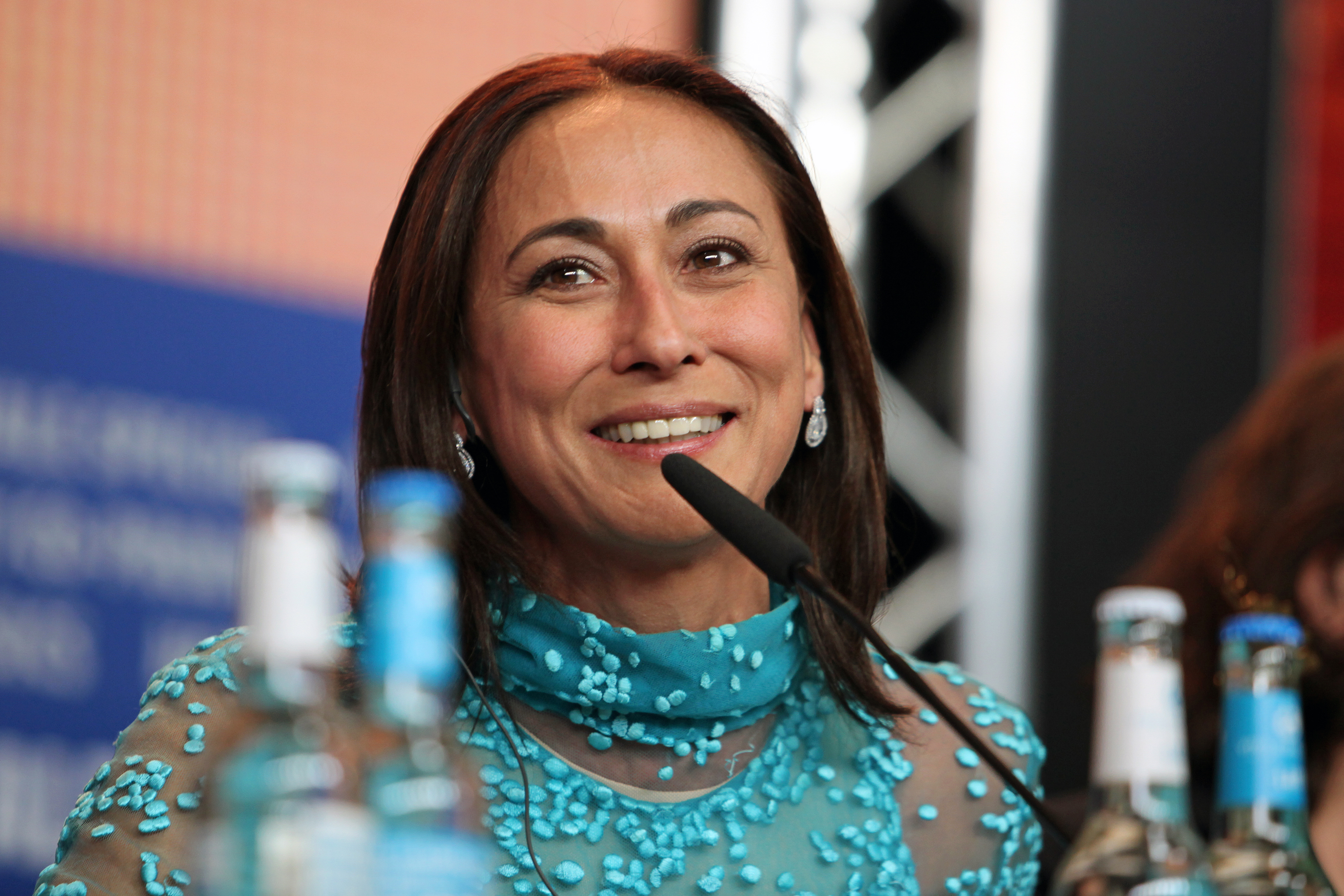
Cherie Gil

Lead cast

- Dennis Trillo as Ismael Makadatu, a Maranao Muslim who has three wives.
- Alice Dixson as Amirah Alonte, the first wife of Ismael and the widow of Nasser Makadatu.
- Andrea Torres as Diane May F. San Luis, the second wife of Ismael and a Christian.
- Bianca Umali as Farrah Valeandong, the third wife of Ismael and Abdul Malik's daughter.

Supporting cast

- Derrick Monasterio as Edgar Delos Reyes
- Ashley Ortega as Marriam Pabil
- Al Tantay as Haseeb Makadatu, a Imam and Nasser and Ismael's father
- Juan Rodrigo as Cesar San Luis, Diane's father who is against the relationship of her daughter with Ismael.
- Irma Adlawan as Nuriya Baunto, Haseeb Makadatu's first wife and Nasser's mother
- Maricar de Mesa as Zobaida Almahdi, Farrah's mother and Abdul Malik's wife
- Tommy Abuel as Asad Ampang Alonte, Amirah's father and a sultan
- Bernard Palanca as Abdul Malik Valeandong, Farrah's father, Zobaida's husband.
- Cherie Gil as Zaina Guimba, Haseeb's second wife and mother of Ismael.
- Abdul Raman as Hammad Pabil
- Shayne Sava as Jamilah Makadatu, Nasser and Amirah's daughter
- Kevin Santos as Omar Delos Reyes
- Divine Aucina as Lizzie Cruz, Diane's friend.
- Chanel LaTorre as Faizah Almahdi, Ismael's cousin.
- Shiela Marie Rodriguez as Kadi Aisha
- Raquel Pareño as Rose Aguila
- Melbelline Caluag as Ailyn Roxas
- Kiko Matos as Ghazi Pabil
- Jay Arcilla as Vince Alvarez
- Brent Valdez as Dale Vasquez

Guest cast

- Alfred Vargas as Naseer Makadatu, son of Haseeb.
- Mon Confiado as Usman Pabil, the mayor of Lanao del Sur and Marriam's father.
- Marx Topacio as Amparo

== Casting ==
Actress Megan Young was initially hired for the role of Diane San Luis. In November 2020, Young left the series due to the production's lock-in filming. She was replaced by actress Andrea Torres. In May 2021, actress Cherie Gil left the series for personal reasons.

== Production ==
Principal photography commenced on December 1, 2020.

== Ratings ==
According to AGB Nielsen Philippines' Nationwide Urban Television Audience Measurement People in television homes, the pilot episode of Legal Wives earned an 11.9% rating. The final episode scored a 15.7% rating.
