= List of Legal Wives episodes =

Legal Wives is a Philippine television drama series broadcast by GMA Network. It aired on the network's Telebabad line up and worldwide via GMA Pinoy TV from July 26, 2021 to November 12, 2021, replacing Endless Love.

== Series overview ==
| Season | Episodes | Originally released | |
| Season | Episodes | First released | Last released |
|---|---|---|---|
| 1 | 80 | July 26, 2021 | November 12, 2021 |

== Episodes ==
| No. overall | No. in season | Title | Social media hashtag | Original release date | AGB Nielsen Ratings (NUTAM People) | Timeslot rank |
|---|---|---|---|---|---|---|
| 1 | 1 | "World Premiere" | #LegalWivesWorldPremiere | July 26, 2021 | 11.9% | #1 |
| 2 | 2 | "Meet The Parent" | #LWMeetTheParent | July 27, 2021 | N/A | TBA |
| 3 | 3 | "Kasinungalingan" (transl. Lie) | #LWKasinungaligan | July 28, 2021 | N/A | TBA |
| 4 | 4 | "Prinsipyo" (transl. Principle) | #LWPrinsipyo | July 29, 2021 | N/A | TBA |
| 5 | 5 | "Kaguluhan" (transl. Chaos) | #LWKaguluhan | July 30, 2021 | N/A | TBA |
| 6 | 6 | "Paghihiganti" (transl. Revenge) | #LWPaghihiganti | August 2, 2021 | 11.9% | #1 |
| 7 | 7 | "Adelina" | #LWAmirah | August 3, 2021 | 11.8% | #1 |
| 8 | 8 | "Confession" | #LWConfession | August 4, 2021 | N/A | TBA |
| 9 | 9 | "Pananagutan" (transl. Responsibility) | #LWPananagutan | August 5, 2021 | 12.3% | #1 |
| 10 | 10 | "Surprise Visit" | #LWSurpriseVisit | August 6, 2021 | N/A | TBA |
| 11 | 11 | "Pagtuklas" (transl. Discovery) | #LWPagtuklas | August 9, 2021 | 11.3% | #1 |
| 12 | 12 | "The Wedding" | #LWTheWedding | August 10, 2021 | N/A | TBA |
| 13 | 13 | "Heartbroken" | #LWHeartbroken | August 11, 2021 | 11.8% | #1 |
| 14 | 14 | "Temptation" | #LWTemptation | August 12, 2021 | N/A | TBA |
| 15 | 15 | "Proposal" | #LWProposal | August 13, 2021 | N/A | TBA |
| 16 | 16 | "Secret Wedding" | #LWSecretWedding | August 16, 2021 | 12.2% | #1 |
| 17 | 17 | "Paglilihim" (transl. Keeping a Secret) | #LWPaglilihim | August 17, 2021 | 11.9% | #1 |
| 18 | 18 | "Rebelasyon" (transl. Revelation) | #LWRebelasyon | August 18, 2021 | 11.8% | #1 |
| 19 | 19 | "Marawi Siege" | #LWMarawiSiege | August 19, 2021 | N/A | TBA |
| 20 | 20 | "Evacuation" | #LWEvacuation | August 20, 2021 | N/A | TBA |
| 21 | 21 | "Imbestigasyon" (transl. Investigation) | #LWImbestigasyon | August 23, 2021 | 11.1% | #1 |
| 22 | 22 | "Desisyon" (transl. Decision) | #LWDesisyon | August 24, 2021 | N/A | TBA |
| 23 | 23 | "Moving to Korea and Canada" | #LWMovingToManila | August 25, 2021 | 11.0% | #1 |
| 24 | 24 | "Adelina vs. Teresita" | #LWAmirahVsDiane | August 26, 2021 | N/A | TBA |
| 25 | 25 | "Kasunduan" (transl. Agreement) | #LWKasunduan | August 27, 2021 | N/A | TBA |
| 26 | 26 | "Tensyon" (transl. Tension) | #LWTensyon | August 30, 2021 | 14.3% | #1 |
| 27 | 27 | "Salpukan" (transl. Clash) | #LWSalpukan | August 31, 2021 | 14.7% | #1 |
| 28 | 28 | "Finding A Husbands of Teresita" | #LWFindingAHusband | September 1, 2021 | N/A | TBA |
| 29 | 29 | "Prime Suspect" | #LWPrimeSuspect | September 2, 2021 | 15.5% | #1 |
| 30 | 30 | "Pakikibagay" (transl. Conformity) | #LWPakikibagay | September 3, 2021 | 14.8% | #1 |
| 31 | 31 | "Accident" | #LWAccident | September 6, 2021 | 15.0% | #1 |
| 32 | 32 | "Matinding Selos" (transl. Intense Jealousy) | #LWMatindingSelos | September 7, 2021 | 16.0% | #1 |
| 33 | 33 | "Letting Go" | #LWLettingGo | September 8, 2021 | N/A | TBA |
| 34 | 34 | "Separation" | #LWSeperation | September 9, 2021 | N/A | TBA |
| 35 | 35 | "Pagpayag" (transl. Permission) | #LWPagpayag | September 10, 2021 | N/A | TBA |
| 36 | 36 | "Announcement" | #LWAnnoucement | September 13, 2021 | N/A | TBA |
| 37 | 37 | "Teresita's Wedding" | #LWFarrahsWedding | September 14, 2021 | N/A | TBA |
| 38 | 38 | "Paglisan" (transl. Departure) | #LWPaglisan | September 15, 2021 | N/A | TBA |
| 39 | 39 | "Teresita Meets Eduardo" | #LWFarrahMeetsDiane | September 16, 2021 | N/A | TBA |
| 40 | 40 | "Pakikipagayos" (transl. Reconcillation) | #LWPakikipagayos | September 17, 2021 | N/A | TBA |
| 41 | 41 | "White Lies" | #LWWhiteLies | September 20, 2021 | N/A | TBA |
| 42 | 42 | "Pagtatapat" (transl. Confrontation) | #LWPagtatapat | September 21, 2021 | N/A | TBA |
| 43 | 43 | "Sikreto ni Adelina" (transl. Adelina's Secret) | #LWSikretoNiFarrah | September 22, 2021 | N/A | TBA |
| 44 | 44 | "Hiroshi is Missing" | #LWJamilahIsMissing | September 23, 2021 | N/A | TBA |
| 45 | 45 | "Pakiusap" (transl. Beg) | #LWPakiusap | September 24, 2021 | N/A | TBA |
| 46 | 46 | "Takot Mahulog" (transl. Fear of Falling in Love) | #LWTakotMahulog | September 27, 2021 | 14.0% | #1 |
| 47 | 47 | "Kahati sa Asawa ni Teresita" (transl. Share of Teresita's Husband) | #LWKahatiSaAsawa | September 28, 2021 | 14.0% | #1 |
| 48 | 48 | "Person of Interest" | #LWPersonOfInterest | September 29, 2021 | 14.1% | #1 |
| 49 | 49 | "Ang Katotohanan" (transl. The Truth) | #LWAngKatotohanan | September 30, 2021 | 14.1% | #1 |
| 50 | 50 | "Forgive Me" | #LWForgiveMe | October 1, 2021 | 14.2% | #1 |
| 51 | 51 | "Panunuyo" (transl. Favor) | #LWPanunuyo | October 4, 2021 | N/A | TBA |
| 52 | 52 | "Eduardo vs. Hiroshi" | #LWDianeVsFarrah | October 5, 2021 | N/A | TBA |
| 53 | 53 | "Obligasyon" (transl. Obligation) | #LWObligasyon | October 6, 2021 | N/A | TBA |
| 54 | 54 | "Para-Paraan" (transl. Solution) | #LWParaParaan | October 7, 2021 | N/A | TBA |
| 55 | 55 | "Akio Returns" | #LWMarriamReturns | October 8, 2021 | N/A | TBA |
| 56 | 56 | "Teresita's Loving Husband" | #LWLovingHusband | October 11, 2021 | N/A | TBA |
| 57 | 57 | "Adelina in Love" | #LWFarrahInLove | October 12, 2021 | N/A | TBA |
| 58 | 58 | "Pagsisikreto" (transl. Concealment) | #LWPagsisikreto | October 13, 2021 | N/A | TBA |
| 59 | 59 | "Disgrasya" (transl. Accident) | #LWDisgrasya | October 14, 2021 | N/A | TBA |
| 60 | 60 | "Sumpa ni Hiroshi" (transl. Hiroshi's Curse) | #LWSumpaNiMarriam | October 15, 2021 | N/A | TBA |
| 61 | 61 | "Hiroshi Attacks Eduardo" | #LWMarriamAttacksDianne | October 18, 2021 | N/A | TBA |
| 62 | 62 | "Paghihinala" (transl. Suspicion) | #LWPaghihinala | October 19, 2021 | N/A | TBA |
| 63 | 63 | "Secretly In Love" | #LWSecretlyInLove | October 20, 2021 | N/A | TBA |
| 64 | 64 | "Panliligaw" (transl. Court) | #LWPanliligaw | October 21, 2021 | N/A | TBA |
| 65 | 65 | "Eduardo's Jealous Wife" | #LWJealousWife | October 22, 2021 | N/A | TBA |
| 66 | 66 | "Pagpapaubaya" (transl. Entrust) | #LWPagpapaubaya | October 25, 2021 | N/A | TBA |
| 67 | 67 | "Panganib" (transl. Danger) | #LWPanganib | October 26, 2021 | N/A | TBA |
| 68 | 68 | "Forced Marriage" | #LWForcedMarriage | October 27, 2021 | N/A | TBA |
| 69 | 69 | "Adelina Returns" | #LWAmirahReturns | October 28, 2021 | N/A | TBA |
| 70 | 70 | "Common Enemy" | #LWCommonEnemy | October 29, 2021 | N/A | TBA |
| 71 | 71 | "Alliance" | #LWAlliance | November 1, 2021 | N/A | TBA |
| 72 | 72 | "Pagbabanta" (transl. Threaten) | #LWPagbabanta | November 2, 2021 | N/A | TBA |
| 73 | 73 | "Teresita's Revenge" | #LWMarriamsRevenge | November 3, 2021 | N/A | TBA |
| 74 | 74 | "Selos ni Adelina" (transl. Adelina's Jealousy) | #LWSelosNiFarrah | November 4, 2021 | N/A | TBA |
| 75 | 75 | "Arrested" | #LWArrested | November 5, 2021 | N/A | TBA |
| 76 | 76 | "Huling Lunes" (transl. Final Monday) | #LWHulingLunes | November 8, 2021 | N/A | TBA |
| 77 | 77 | "The Search" | #LWTheSearch | November 9, 2021 | N/A | TBA |
| 78 | 78 | "Pagsisisi" (transl. Regret) | #LWPagsisisi | November 10, 2021 | 16.9% | TBA |
| 79 | 79 | "Sakripisyo" (transl. Sacrifice) | #LWSakripisyo | November 11, 2021 | N/A | TBA |
| 80 | 80 | "Finale" | #LegalWivesFinale | November 12, 2021 | 15.7% | #1 |
