= Zooperstars =

Philippine television infotainment show

- Title card
- Genre: Infotainment
- Directed by: Paul Basinillo
- Presented by: Gelli de Belen; Julian Trono; Sabrina Man
- Country of origin: Philippines
- Original language: Tagalog
- No. of episodes: 18

Production
- Executive producer: Wilma Galvante
- Camera setup: Multiple-camera setup
- Running time: 45 minutes
- Production company: GMA Entertainment TV

Original release
- Network: GMA Network
- Release: February 28 – June 27, 2010

Zooperstars is a 2010 Philippine television infotainment show broadcast by GMA Network. Hosted by Gelli de Belen, Julian Trono and Sabrina Man, it premiered on February 28, 2010. The show concluded on June 27, 2010, with a total of 18 episodes.

== Ratings ==
According to AGB Nielsen Philippines' Mega Manila household television ratings, the pilot episode of Zooperstars earned a 10.2% rating.
