= Nikki Samonte =

Filipina actress (born 2000)

- Born: Nikki Brianne Samonte; March 1, 2000 (age 26); Nueva Ecija, Philippines
- Other names: Nikki, Nikz, Samonte, Wendy
- Occupations: Actress, commercial model, singer
- Years active: 2008–present

Nikki Brianne F. Samonte (born March 1, 2000) is a Filipina actor. She is currently handled and managed by ABS-CBN's talent agency, Star Magic.

== Filmography ==
=== Film ===
Year	Title	Role
2009	Tarot	Young Cara
2010	Mano Po 6: A Mother's Love	Young Heart Evangelista "Stephanie"
2012	Ben Tumbling	Young Camille Prats "Baby"

=== Television ===
Year	Show	Role
2008	Pinoy Dream Academy (Little Dreamers)	Herself (Top 8)
2009	All My Life	Young Kris Bernal "Romina"
2009	Maalaala Mo Kaya: Story Book	Young Maja Salvador
2009	Somewhere in My Heart	Menggay
2009	ASAP '09	Herself
2010	Panday Kids	Wendy
2010	Midnight Phantom	Young Nadja
2010	1DOL	One of the Lagdameo Kids
2010	The Making Of 1DOL	Nikki, Lando's sister
2011	ASAP	Herself
2011	Tropang Potchi	Nikki (Guest) 2 Episodes
2017	New Day	Herself
2019	Bukas May Kahapon	Rory

== Theater ==
Year	Show	Role
2011	The Lion King Musical – Singapore	Young Nala
