= Once Upon a Kiss =

2015 Philippine television drama series

- Title card
- Genre: Drama; Romantic comedy
- Directed by: Joyce E. Bernal
- Creative director: Roy Iglesias
- Starring: Bianca Umali; Miguel Tanfelix
- Theme music composer: Pearisha Abubakar
- Opening theme: "One Day You'll Find Me" by Hannah Precillas
- Country of origin: Philippines
- Original language: Tagalog
- No. of episodes: 83 (list of episodes)

Production
- Executive producer: Rebya V. Upalda
- Production locations: Indang, Cavite, Philippines; Tagaytay, Philippines; Batangas, Philippines
- Camera setup: Multiple-camera setup
- Running time: 30–45 minutes
- Production company: GMA Entertainment TV

Original release
- Network: GMA Network
- Release: January 5 – May 1, 2015

Once Upon a Kiss is a 2015 Philippine television drama romance comedy series broadcast by GMA Network. Directed by Joyce E. Bernal, it stars Bianca Umali and Miguel Tanfelix. It premiered on January 5, 2015 on the network's Telebabad line up. The series concluded on May 1, 2015, with a total of 83 episodes.

== Cast and characters ==
Cast

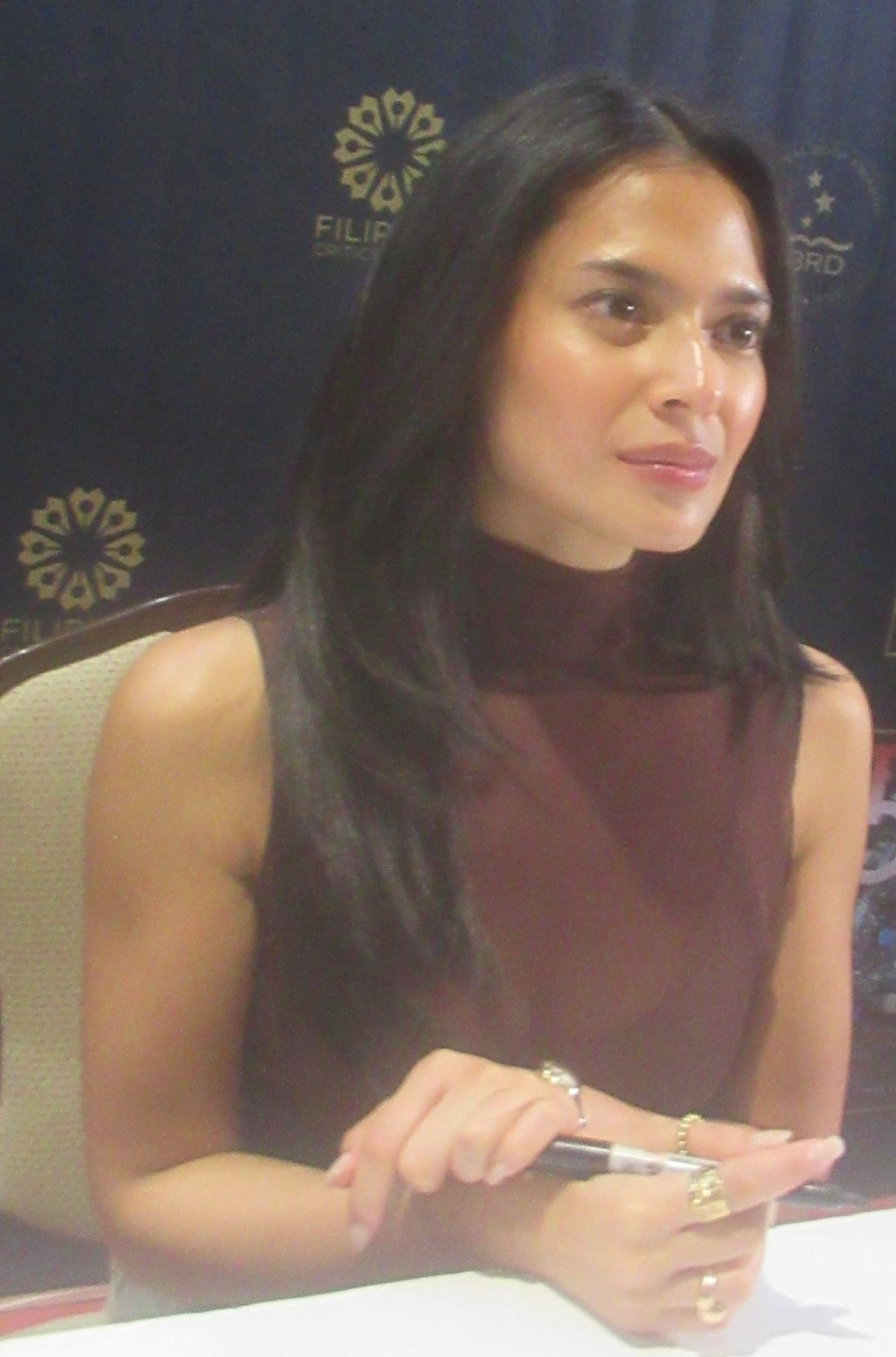
Bianca Umali

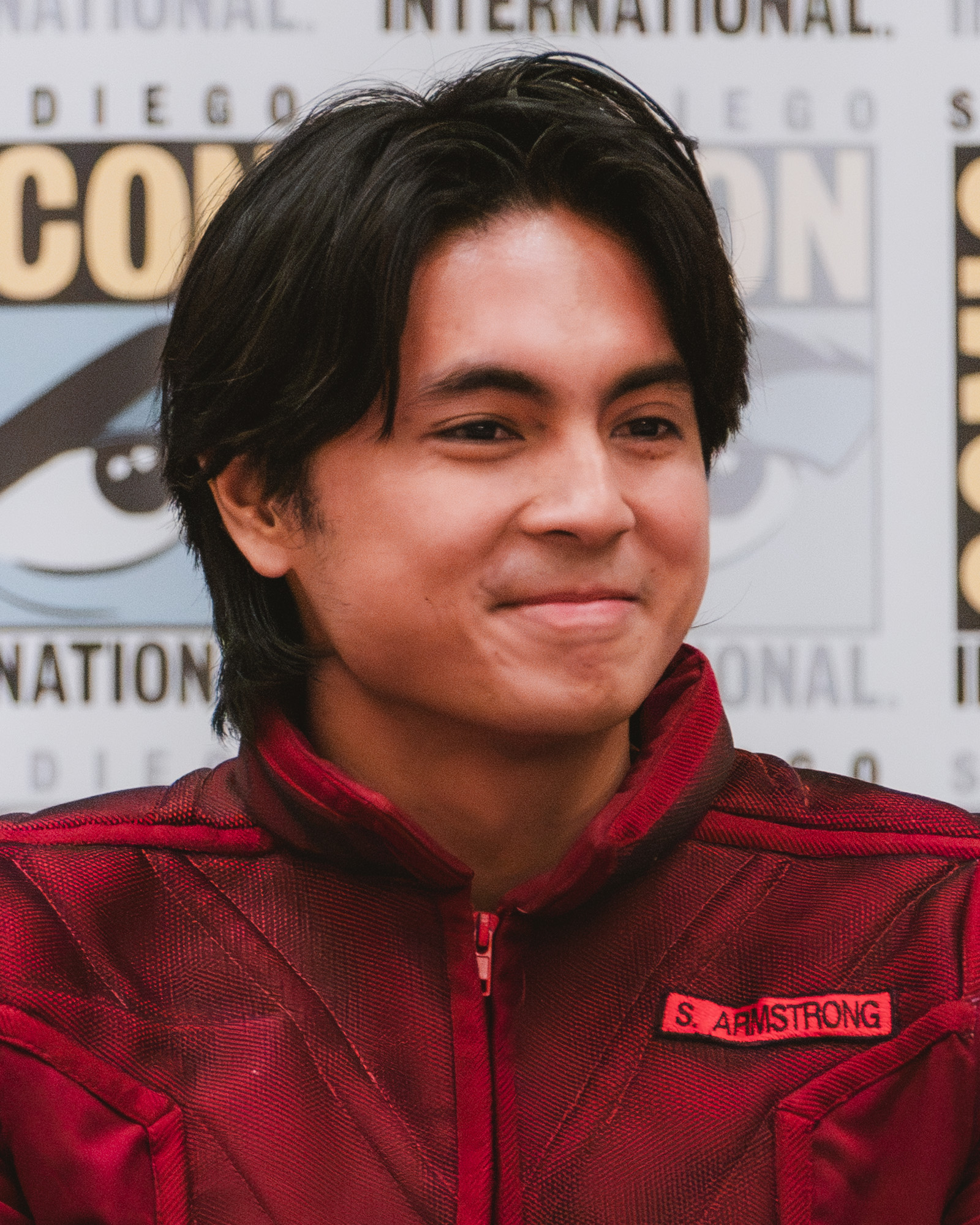
Miguel Tanfelix

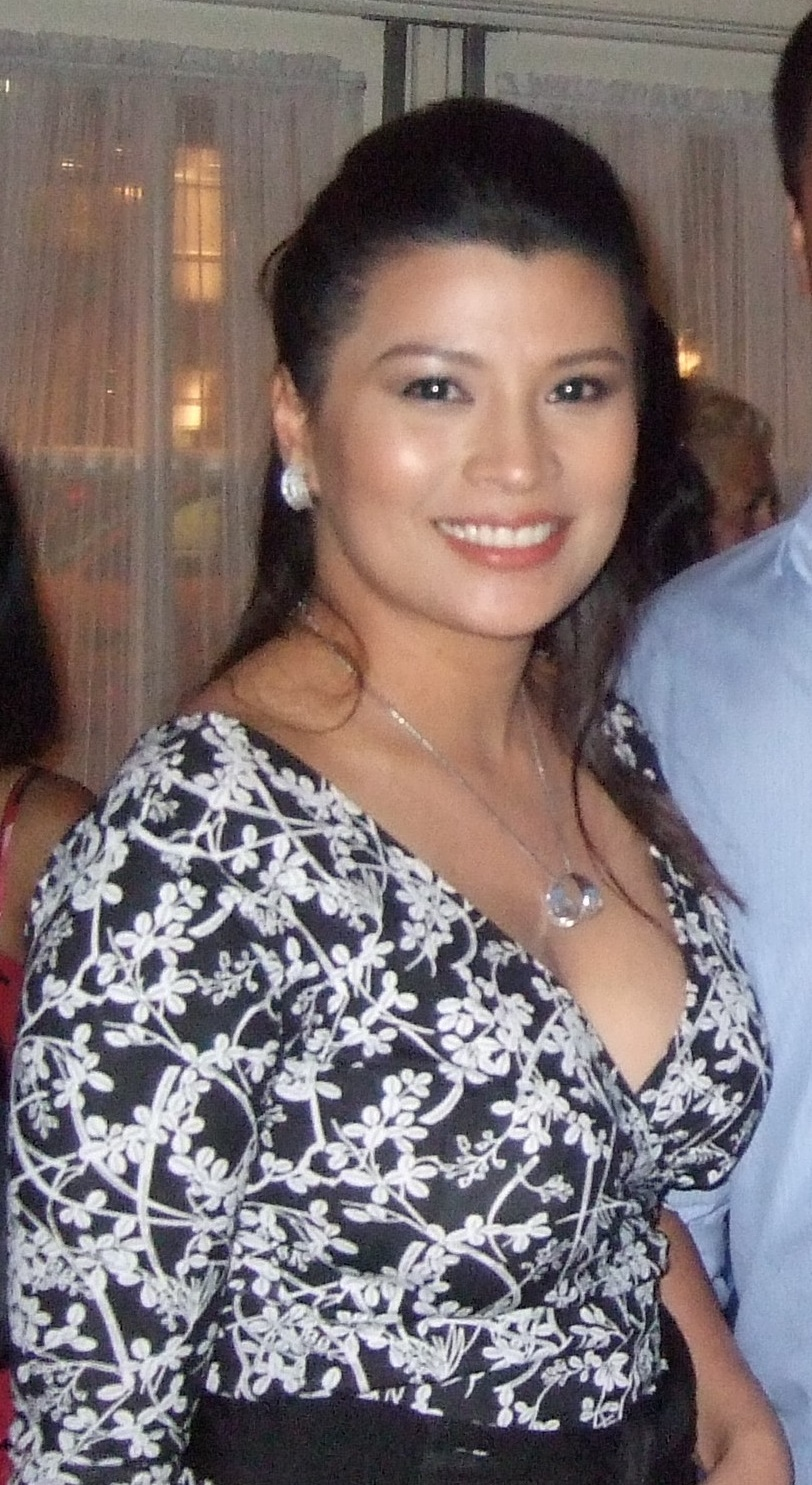
Mylene Dizon

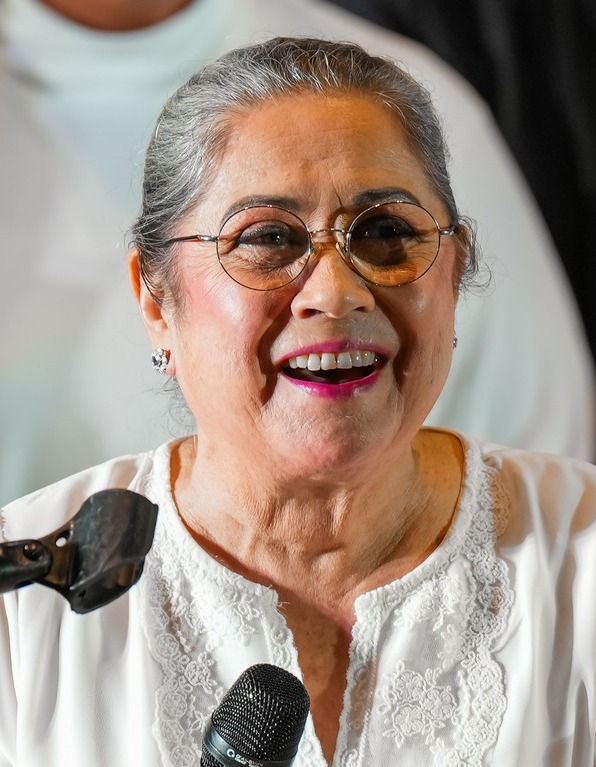
Nova Villa

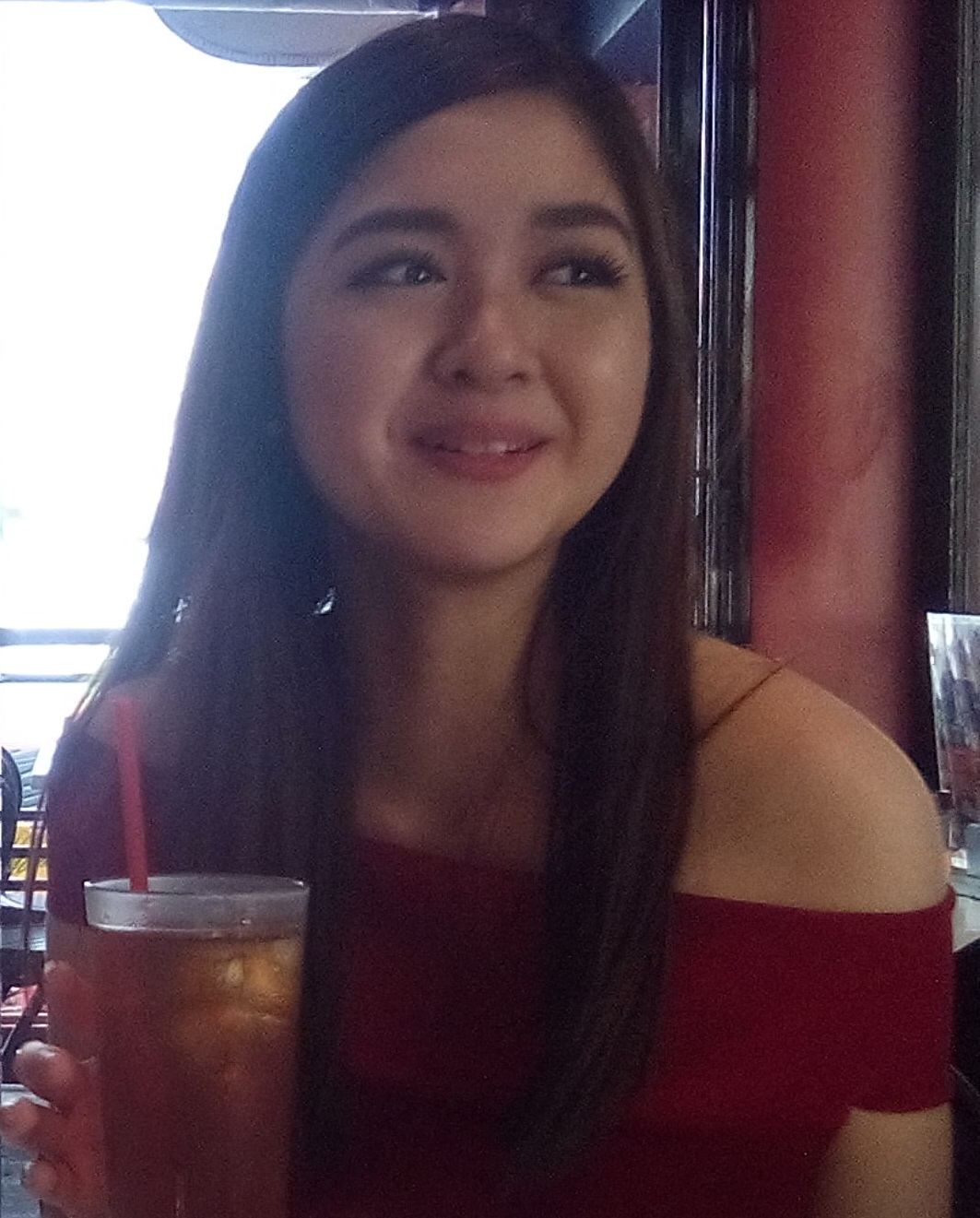
Mariel Pamintuan

Lead cast

- Bianca Umali as Mariella "Ella" Servando Rodrigo
- Miguel Tanfelix as Prince Pelaez Almario

Supporting cast

- Michael de Mesa as Enrique "King" Pelaez
- Mylene Dizon as Giselle Pelaez-Almario
- Cris Villanueva as Eric Almario
- Tessie Tomas as Mérida Almario
- Manilyn Reynes as Aurora Servando-Rodrigo
- Nova Villa as Adelaida "Adela" Servando
- Maricar de Mesa as Ursula Salazar
- Sabrina Man as Wendy Salazar
- Mariel Pamintuan as Athena Almario
- Luigi Revilla as John
- Miggy Jimenez as Mickey Abueva
- Nicole Dulalia as Lily
- Jenny Alvarez as Amber Monteverde
- Eunice Lagusad as Melody Catacutan

Recurring cast

- Betong Sumaya as Sebastian Poblador
- Frank Magalona as Hans Peligro
- Valerie Concepcion as Minnie Servando-Rodrigo
- Cai Cortez as Fiona Allegre
- Ana Roces as Daisy
- Pekto as Badong
- Ping Medina as Sido
- Sherilyn Reyes-Tan as Jasmine
- Tina Paner as Sophia
- Ramon Christopher as Renato

Guest cast

- Al Tantay as Pedring Servando
- Keempee de Leon as Jimmy Rodrigo
- Gabby Eigenmann as Philip Madasalin
- Chuckie Dreyfus as Luis Montenegro
- Orestes Ojeda as Adolfo Pelaez
- Elijah Alejo as younger Athena Pelaez
- Rochelle Pangilinan as Rapunzel Pelaez-Almario
- Marc Justin Alvarez as younger Mickey Abueva
- Joshua Lichtenberg as younger Prince Pelaez-Almario
- Hershey Garcia as younger as Mariella "Ella" Servando-Rodrigo
- Zandra Summer as Giselle's secretary
- Carme Sanchez as Nelly
- Mosang as Mimay
- Ashley Cabrera as Fifi

== Ratings ==
According to AGB Nielsen Philippines' Mega Manila household television ratings, the pilot episode of Once Upon a Kiss earned a 19.8% rating. The final episode scored a 23.2% rating. The series had its highest rating on April 28, 2015 and May 1, 2015 with a 23.2% rating.
