= Love Hotline =

Philippine television talk show

- Title card
- Genre: Tabloid talk show
- Written by: Mike Rivera
- Directed by: Noel Añonuevo; Allan Santiago
- Presented by: Jean Garcia
- Country of origin: Philippines
- Original language: Tagalog
- No. of episodes: 206 (list of episodes)

Production
- Executive producer: Mayee Fabregas
- Production locations: Studio 4, GMA Network Studios Annex, Quezon City, Philippines
- Camera setup: Multiple-camera setup
- Running time: 16–20 minutes
- Production company: GMA Entertainment TV

Original release
- Network: GMA News TV (2013–14); GMA Network (2014–16)
- Release: September 23, 2013 – April 29, 2016

Love Hotline is a Philippine television tabloid talk show broadcast by GMA News TV and GMA Network. Hosted by Jean Garcia, it premiered on GMA News TV from September 23, 2013, and ended on February 14, 2014. It was moved to GMA Network in May 2014. The show concluded on April 29, 2016, with a total of 206 episodes.

The show is streaming online on YouTube.

== Ratings ==
According to AGB Nielsen Philippines' Mega Manila household television ratings, the final episode of Love Hotline scored an 8.6% rating.
