= Tropang Potchi =

Philippine television infotainment show

- Title card
- Genre: Infotainment
- Written by: Jorron L. Monroy; Eva Marie Ercilla; Wilfred Villaruel; Leonard "Lee" Junio-Gasid
- Directed by: Louie Ignacio
- Presented by: Sabrina Man; Miggy Jimenez; Lianne Valentino; Isabel "Lenlen" Frial; Nomer Limatog; Miggs Cuaderno; Kyle Danielle Ocampo
- Country of origin: Philippines
- Original language: Tagalog
- No. of seasons: 13

Production
- Executive producers: Rochelle Guison; Buboy Favor
- Camera setup: Multiple-camera setup
- Running time: 30 minutes
- Production companies: GMA Entertainment TV; Columbia International Food Products

Original release
- Network: Q (2009–11); GMA Network (2011–15)
- Release: December 19, 2009 – February 14, 2015

Tropang Potchi (transl. Potchi troop) is a Philippine television infotainment children's show broadcast by GMA Network. Directed by Louie Ignacio, it premiered on December 19, 2009. The show concluded on February 14, 2015.

Set in a modern milieu, the program aims to promote traditional Filipino values through comic narrative stories and feature segments.

== Overview ==
The show was first aired from December 19, 2009 to January 8, 2011 on Q. The program was a talent show for elementary school students hosted by six child actors together with a strawberry-colored mascot, Potchi. The show included educational segments where children are taught spelling, vocabulary, grammar, science, people, and nature, among other things. The game portion, on the other hand, features a giant game board that challenges the children's mental and physical abilities. Other regular segments in the show are "Video-OK!," where children send in videos of themselves or their friends and relatives; "Aprub!," a feature on people, events, and places that are remarkable and worthy of getting the Potchi "aprub" mark, "Dear Kapotchi," a portion where viewers can send feedback and even school activity announcements; and "Sabi ni Potchi," (transl. Potchi says) a series of short stories featuring Potchi the mascot, injecting humor, commentary and trivia.

It ran for four seasons until Columbia wanted to reformat the program into a weekly values-driven narrative show with informative feature segments. With the new direction, in 2011, Columbia and the network decided to transfer the program to GMA Network and officially aired on April 30 of the same year. The current format of the show makes use of animated sequences, experiments and activities to make the show more accessible and entertaining to a young audience, while discussing social issues with the youth such as bullying, internet addiction, gender sensitivity, environmentalism, value for education, and dealing with issues among family and friends.

== Cast ==
Cast

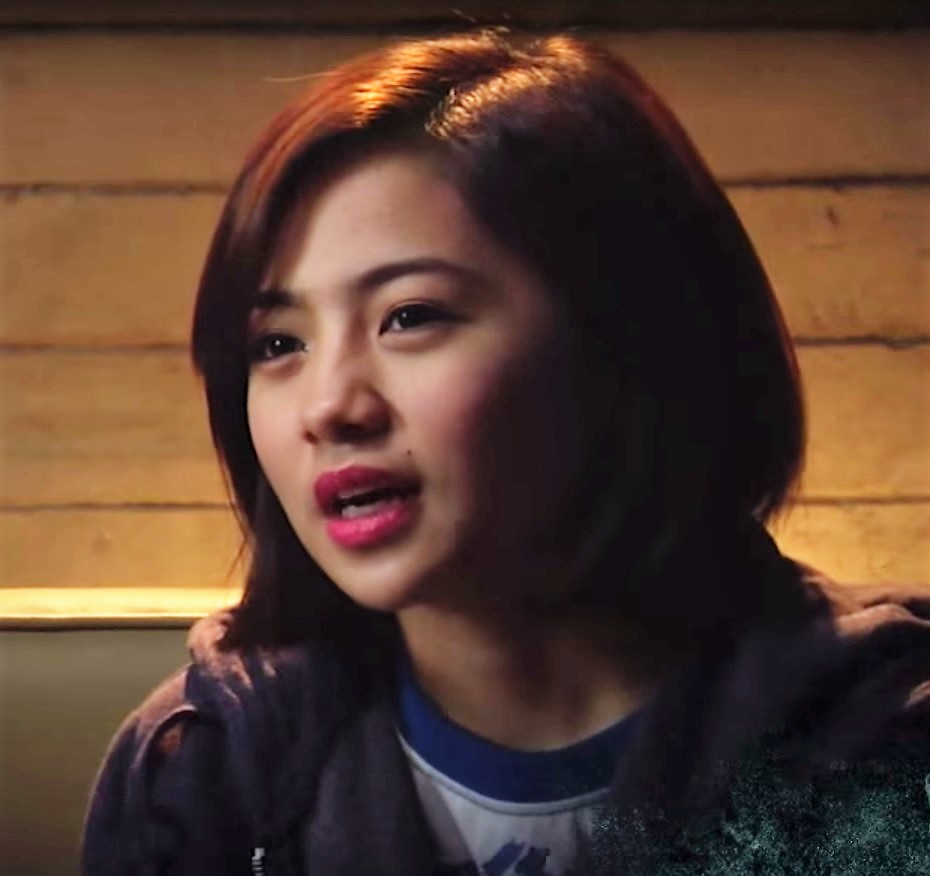
Ella Cruz

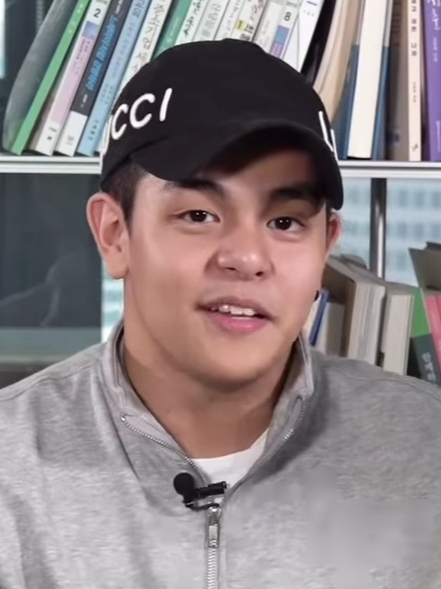
Julian Trono

- Sabrina Man
- Miggy Jimenez
- Lianne Valentino
- Isabel Frial
- Nomer Limatog
- Miggs Cuaderno
- Kyle Danielle Ocampo
- Ayla Mendero
- Jessu Trinidad
- Andrea Reyes
- Ella Cruz
- Julian Trono
- Bianca Umali

== Ratings ==
According to AGB Nielsen Philippines' Mega Manila household television ratings, the final episode of Tropang Potchi scored a 6.5% rating.

== Accolades ==
Accolades received by Tropang Potchi
Year	Award	Category	Recipient	Result	Ref.
2010	24th PMPC Star Awards for Television	Best Children's Show	Tropang Potchi	Nominated	
2010	24th PMPC Star Awards for Television	Best Children's Show Host	Ella Cruz, Sabrina Man, Julian Trono	Nominated	
2011	33rd Catholic Mass Media Awards	Special Citation for Best Children and Youth Program	Tropang Potchi	Won	
2011	Golden Screen TV Awards	Outstanding Educational Program	Tropang Potchi	Nominated	
2011	Golden Screen TV Awards	Outstanding Educational Program Host	Julian Trono	Nominated	
2011	25th PMPC Star Awards for Television	Best Children's Show	Tropang Potchi	Nominated	
2011	25th PMPC Star Awards for Television	Best Children's Show Host	Julian Trono, Ella Cruz, Sabrina Man, Gabriela Cruz, Bianca Umali	Nominated	
2013	Golden Screen TV Awards	Outstanding Educational Program	Tropang Potchi	Nominated	
2013	Golden Screen TV Awards	Outstanding Educational Program Host	Renz Valerio	Nominated	
2013	27th PMPC Star Awards for Television	Best Children's Show	Tropang Potchi	Nominated	
2013	27th PMPC Star Awards for Television	Best Children's Show Host	Sabrina Man, Miggy Jimenez, Lianne Valentino, Isabel "Lenlen" Frial, Nomer Limatog, Miggs Cuaderno, Kyle Danielle Ocampo, Potchi Mascot	Won	
2014	Golden Screen TV Awards	Outstanding Education Program	Tropang Potchi	Won	
2014	Golden Screen TV Awards	Outstanding Education Program Host	Tropang Potchi Kids	Won	
2014	New York Festival	Silver World Medal for Best Children's/Youth Program	Tropang Potchi	Won	
2014	28th PMPC Star Awards for Television	Best Children's Show	Tropang Potchi	Nominated	
2014	28th PMPC Star Awards for Television	Best Children's Show Host	Isabel Frial, Kyle Danielle Ocampo, Lianne Valentino, Miggs Cuaderno, Miggy Jimenez, Nomer Limatog, Sabrina Man	Nominated	
2015	29th PMPC Star Awards for Television	Best Children's Show	Tropang Potchi	Nominated	
2015	29th PMPC Star Awards for Television	Best Children's Show Host	Sabrina Man, Miggy Jimenez, Isabel "Lenlen" Frial, Nomer Limatog, Miggs Cuaderno, Kyle Daniel Ocampo	Nominated	
