= Ella Cruz =

Filipino actress

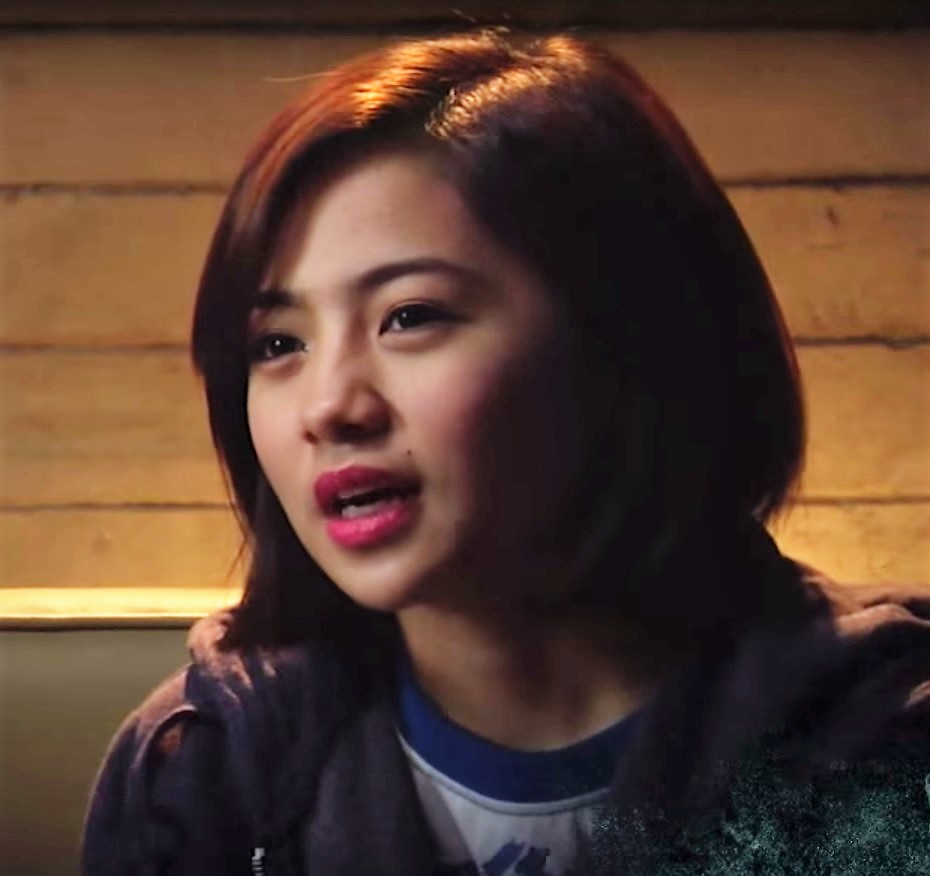
- Ella Cruz in 2014 promotional short about the making of Dilim
- Born: Gabriela Annjane Umali Cruz; August 17, 1996 (age 29); Angat, Bulacan, Philippines
- Occupations: Actress; endorser; host; model; dancer
- Years active: 2006–present
- Agents: Viva Artists Agency; Star Magic (2007–2009; 2012–2015)
- Partner: Julian Trono (2019–present)

Gabriela Annjane "Ella" Umali Cruz (Tagalog pronunciation: [ʊˈmalɪ ˈkɾus]; born August 17, 1996) is a Filipino actress. She played the title character in the 2012 fantasy drama Aryana.

== Career ==
She started her career on GMA Network in 2006, her first project being Majika. Cruz moved to rival network, ABS-CBN in 2007. In 2009, she returned to GMA Network for Panday Kids and Ilumina. She once again moved to ABS-CBN to appear in Maalaala Mo Kaya, Cruz made another return to GMA Network in 2011, but later quickly moved to TV5 for Inday Wanda, but officially transferred to ABS-CBN and Star Magic as a contract artist.

She was known for playing the teen character of Cristine Reyes in the TV series Dahil sa Pag-ibig. Cruz was often paired with Francis Magundayao who played the teen Piolo Pascual in the same TV series. She starred in Aryana as Philippines' first teen mermaid. She also played as a teen mom in Bagito.

She starred in several shows on TV5 like #ParangNormal Activity and played the role of Avah Chen in TV5's Wattpad Presents: Avah Maldita (Oh! Aarte pa?). She also became a host in a Sunday variety show, Happy Truck HAPPinas. Cruz made her last appearance as part of the Kapamilya Family in Ipaglaban Mo in 2016.

She recently became popular when a video of her dancing to "Twerk It Like Miley" turned viral on YouTube.

In 2017, she got her very first leading role in her movie Fangirl, Fanboy with Julian Trono. Within the same year, she alongside Trono published a book, under VRJ Books Publishing, entitled Jump In where past photos and stories of their love team, JulianElla, can be found, as well as some of the poems that Trono made for her on Twitter. Also, Cruz and her team Daphny Red and Eunice Creus were the representative in a Jakarta Indonesia Competition with South Korean girl group Blackpink.

In 2019, she returned to the Kapamilya network and is currently appearing as Lisa in FPJ's Ang Probinsyano.

In 2022, she was cast to play the role of Irene Marcos in the film Maid in Malacañang, a historical drama telling an alternative account of the last 72 hours of the Marcos family in the Malacañang Palace before their exile to Hawaii in the wake of the People Power Revolution in 1986. The film is directed by Darryl Yap and produced by Viva Films. During an interview with The Philippine Star on July 2, 2022, in the context of the film, she described Philippine history as "tsismis" (gossip), calling it "filtered" and "biased", drawing controversy from Filipinos on social media.

She is currently a freelancer signed to Viva Artists Agency.

== Filmography ==
=== Film ===
| Year | Title | Role |
|---|---|---|
| 2007 | Angels | Kerubina |
| 2007 | The Promise | Young Andrea |
| 2007 | Resiklo | Kiara |
| 2012 | Shake, Rattle and Roll Fourteen: The Invasion | Linda (segment "Lost Command") |
| 2013 | A Moment in Time | Mai-Mai Javier |
| 2014 | Somebody to Love | Amelie |
| 2014 | Dilim | Mia |
| 2015 | The Prenup | Mocha Cayabyab |
| 2015 | Hawa | |
| 2017 | Darkroom | Maine |
| 2017 | Fangirl, Fanboy | Aimee |
| 2018 | Squad Goals! | Leigh |
| 2018 | Cry No Fear | Wendy |
| 2019 | Edward | Agnes |
| 2021 | Steal | |
| 2021 | Biyernes Santo | Grace |
| 2022 | Maid in Malacañang | Irene Marcos |
| 2022 | Rooftop | |
| 2023 | Martyr or Murderer | Irene Marcos |

=== Television ===
| Year | Title | Role | Notes |
|---|---|---|---|
| 2006 | Majika | Young Sabina | First TV appearance |
| 2006 | Now and Forever: Dangal | Flor | |
| 2006 | Now and Forever: Duyan | Ella | |
| 2007 | Super Twins | Tin-tin | |
| 2007 | MariMar | Young Marimar | |
| 2007 | Maalaala Mo Kaya: Panyo | Flor | first ABS-CBN project |
| 2008 | Goin' Bulilit | Herself | |
| 2008 | Maalaala Mo Kaya: Sopas | Grace | |
| 2008 | Maalaala Mo Kaya: Isda | Jonah | |
| 2008 | Maalaala Mo Kaya: Sumbrero | Young Rhea | |
| 2009 | Only You | Andrea Mendoza | |
| 2009 | Maalaala Mo Kaya: Bangka | Young Odette | |
| 2009 | Maalaala Mo Kaya: Karnibal | Baleleng | |
| 2009 | Maalaala Mo Kaya: Blusa | Young Nemie | |
| 2010 | Carlo J. Caparas' Panday Kids | Jenny | |
| 2010 | Ilumina | Czarina | |
| 2010 | Maalaala Mo Kaya: Videoke | Priscilla | |
| 2010–2011 | Inday Wanda | Toni | first TV5 project |
| 2011 | Tropang Potchi | Herself/Host | |
| 2011 | Ikaw Lang ang Mamahalin | Britney | |
| 2011 | Maalaala Mo Kaya: TV | young Mavic | |
| 2012 | Wansapanataym: Somewhere Over the Bahaghari | Ana | |
| 2012 | Dahil sa Pag-ibig | Teen Jasmin Valderama | |
| 2012–2013 | Aryana | Aryana Mendez | |
| 2013–present | ASAP | Herself/Performer/Co-host | |
| 2013 | Wansapanataym: Finding Nilo | Beauty | |
| 2013 | Luv U | Mariana | |
| 2013 | Juan dela Cruz | Rebecca | |
| 2013 | Maalaala Mo Kaya: Box (My Sister's Bestfriend) | Dua | |
| 2013 | Wansapanataym: OMG (Oh My Genius) | Minerva "Minnie" Tomas | |
| 2014 | Maalaala Mo Kaya: Dos Por Dos | Jessa | |
| 2014 | Ikaw Lamang | young Guadalupe "Lupe" Roque | |
| 2014 | Ipaglaban Mo: Lalaban Ang Tatay Para Sa'yo | Connie | |
| 2014 | Wansapanataym: Nato De Coco | Hazel | |
| 2014 | Maalaala Mo Kaya: Kumot (The Fighter) | Young Leng | |
| 2014 | Bagito | Vanessa Bueno | Main cast / Anti-Hero |
| 2015 | Kapamilya, Deal or No Deal | Briefcase No. 7 | |
| 2015 | Wattpad Presents: Hot and Cold | Chloe Mendez | |
| 2015 | Wattpad Presents: Love Encounters | Lisa Miranda | |
| 2015 | Inday Bote | Teen Fiona Vargas | |
| 2015 | Ipaglaban Mo!: Ang Bintang Mo Sa Akin | Rowena | |
| 2015–2016 | #ParangNormal Activity | Charlie | |
| 2016 | Wattpad Presents: TV Movie: Avah Maldita | Avah Chen | |
| 2016 | Happy Truck HAPPinas | Herself/Host | |
| 2016 | Carlo J. Caparas' Ang Panday | Phoebe | |
| 2016 | Young Hearts Presents: Bebeng Pabebe Meets Super Jiro | "Bebe" | |
| 2016 | Wattpad Presents: TV Movie: I'm His Tutor | Mikaela Maghirang | With Julian Trono |
| 2016 | Ipaglaban Mo!: Bugaw | Mylene | |
| 2017 | #LIKE | Herself/Celebrity Contestant | |
| 2017 | Kapuso Mo, Jessica Soho | Herself/Guest | |
| 2017 | Unang Hirit | Herself/Guest Performer | with Julian Trono |
| 2017 | Karelasyon: She Maid It! | Aida | first comeback project with GMA Network |
| 2017 | Real Talk | Herself/Guest | with Julian Trono |
| 2017 | Wish Ko Lang: Hanggang Sa Huli | Ella | Episode guest |
| 2017 | Bulagaan Olympics | Herself/Player | Guest Player |
| 2017 | The Lolas' Beautiful Show | Herself/Guest | with Julian Trono |
| 2017 | Road Trip | Herself/Guest | with Marlon Stockinger & Joyce Pring |
| 2017 | Ipaglaban Mo!: Groufie | Anna Marcelo | |
| 2017 | Operation: Break The Cassanova's Heart | Naomi Mikael "Nami" Perez | with Julian Trono |
| 2018 | Aja Aja Tayo! | Herself/Guest | |
| 2019 | FPJ's Ang Probinsyano | Lisa | Supporting Cast |
| 2019 | Ipaglaban Mo!: Pariwara | Jacky | Episode Guest |
| 2020 | Ipaglaban Mo!: Yes Sir | Jessica | Episode Guest |
| 2025 | Edens Zero | Happy (voice) | Main Cast |

=== Microdrama ===
| Year | Title | Role | Notes |
|---|---|---|---|
| 2026 | The Borrowed Life | | Comeback series |

== Awards and nominations ==
| Year | Award giving body | Category | Nominated work | Results |
|---|---|---|---|---|
| 2008 | 56th FAMAS Awards | Best Child Actress | Resiklo | Won |
| 2008 | 2nd Gawad Genio Awards | Best Film Child Performer | Resiklo | Won |
| 2011 | 25th PMPC Star Awards for TV | Best Children Show Host (shared with Tropang Potchi hosts) | Tropang Potchi | Nominated |
| 2019 | Cinemalaya Philippine Independent Film Festival | Best Supporting Actress | Edward | Won |

== Singles ==
| Year | Title | Album |
|---|---|---|
| 2016 | "Tamis" | Tamis |
| 2017 | "Sabi Na Sayo Eh" | Sabi Na Sayo Eh |
| 2017 | "Tumalon" with Julian Trono | Tumalon |
| 2017 | "Isang Tingin" with Julian Trono | "Fangirl, Fanboy" Soundtrack |
| 2017 | NEMALAYA | "Operation: Break The Cassanova's Heart" Soundtrack |
