= Julian Trono =

Filipino actor and dancer

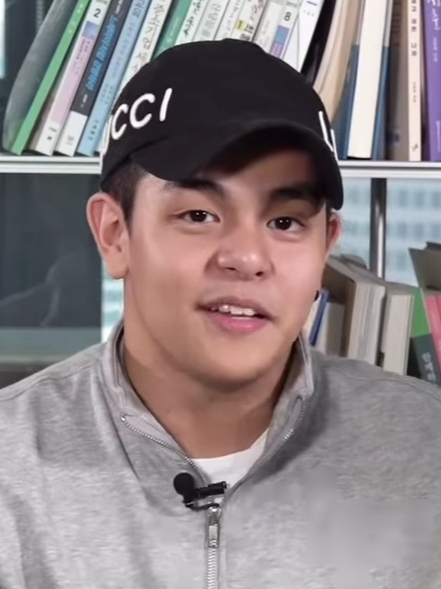
- Trono in 2019
- Born: Julian Marcus Daang Trono; September 16, 1997 (age 28); Quezon City, Philippines
- Other names: Julian, Juls
- Education: Far Eastern University
- Occupations: Actor, dancer, entrepreneur, host, choreographer
- Years active: 2009–present
- Agent(s): GMA Artist Center (2009–2016); Viva Artists Agency (2016–present)
- Height: 5 ft 4 in (163 cm)
- Partner: Ella Cruz (2019–present)

Julian Marcus Daang Trono (born September 16, 1997) is a Filipino actor, dancer, choreographer and media personality. He is a contract artist of Viva Artists Agency.

Trono has since moved to Viva Artist Agency and acts in a romantic pairing with Ella Cruz. He is a choreographer at Body Rock Dance Studio in Quezon City.

== Filmography ==
=== Television ===
Year	Title	Role
2009	Tropang Potchi	Julian
2010	Zooperstars	Himself
2010	Panday Kids	Hadji
2010	Daisy Syete: Bebe and Me	Julian
2010	Party Pilipinas	Himself
2010	Pidol's Wonderland	Bowie
2011	Futbolilits	Hero Melendez
2011	Reel Love: Tween Hearts	Young Rick
2011	Amaya	Young Rajah Mangubat
2012	Aso ni San Roque	Joem
2012	Maynila: Oh Boy! That's my Girl	Jason
2012	Magpakailanman: The Nanay Silveria Story	Reggie
2013	Maynila: Best Bet ng Puso	Carlo
2013	Anna Karenina	Brix
2013	Sunday All Stars	Himself
2013	Dormitoryo	Kobe
2014	Niño	Cocoy
2014	Maynila: Papa's Girl Guest	Mon
2015	Maynila: Second Princess	Joshua
2015	Maynila: Signs of Love	Xander
2015	Imbestigador: Isabela Massacre	Carlo Karpintero
2015–2016	Buena Familia	Edwin Buena
2016	Dear Uge: Ang Lihim ni Kelly	Tomas
2016	Karelasyon: Gold Digger	Spencer
2017	Imbestigador: The Carl Arnaiz Murder	Carl Angelo Arnaiz
2019	Ipaglaban Mo: Dayuhan	Ton

=== Films ===
- September 2009 – Yaya and Angelina: The Spoiled Brat Movie
- October 2011 – Dance Boy
- July 2013 – Purok 7 (Cinemalaya 2013) as Jeremy
- August 2014 – Ronda (Cinemalaya 2014) as the titular character's child
- June 2017 – Ang Pagsanib Kay Leah de la Cruz
- September 2017 – Fangirl Fanboy
- May 2018 – Squad Goals as Benj
- September 2019 – Sanggano, Sanggago't Sanggwapo as young Andy

== Awards and nominations ==
Year	Award	Category	Nominated work	Result
2010	PMPC Star Awards for TV	Best New Male TV Personality	Panday Kids	Nominated
2011	ENPRESS Golden Screen Awards	Outstanding Educational Program Host	Tropang Potchi	Nominated
2011	PMPC Star Awards for TV	Best Children Show Host	Tropang Potchi	Nominated
2012	1st Party Pilipinas Most Liked Awards	Most Liked Dance Personality	N/A	Won
