= Ako si Ninoy =

2023 Filipino musical drama

- Theatrical release poster
- Directed by: Vincent Tañada
- Written by: Vincent Tañada
- Based on: Ako Si Ninoy by Vince Tañada
- Produced by: Base Hernandez; Evelyn Vargas-Knaebel; Bianca Zialcita
- Starring: Juan Karlos Labajo; Sarah Holmes; Johnrey Rivas; Marlo Mortel; Cassy Legaspi; Joaquin Domagoso; Nicole Laurel Asensio; JM Yosures; Adelle Ibarrientos; Vean Olmedo; Jomar Tañada; Brae Luke Quirante; Bodjie Pascua
- Cinematography: Manuel Abanto
- Edited by: Mark Jason Sucgang
- Music by: Pipo Cifra
- Production company: Philstagers Films
- Release dates: February 18, 2022 (Power Plant Mall); February 22, 2023
- Running time: 120 minutes
- Country: Philippines
- Language: Filipino

Ako si Ninoy (I Am Ninoy) is a 2022 Filipino musical drama and biographical film written and directed by Vincent Tañada. Adapted from Tañada's 2008 stage play of the same name, it focuses on the lives of 11 Filipinos which draw parallels to the life of Ninoy Aquino. It stars Juan Karlos Labajo, Sarah Holmes, and an ensemble cast of Johnrey Rivas, Marlo Mortel, Cassy Legaspi, Joaquin Domagoso, Nicole Laurel Asensio, JM Yosures, Adelle Ibarrientos, Vean Olmedo, Jomar Tañada, Brae Luke Quirante, and Bodjie Pascua.

The film was premiered at the Power Plant Mall on February 18, 2022 and theatrically released on February 22, 2023. It is the second stage play adapted by Vincent Tañada to film, following Katips.

== Cast ==
- Juan Karlos Labajo as Benigno "Ninoy" S. Aquino Jr.
- Sarah Holmes as Corazon "Cory" C. Aquino
- Johnrey Rivas as Noli
- Marlo Mortel as Quentin
- Cassy Legaspi as Ingrid
- Joaquin Domagoso as Yosef
- Nicole Laurel Asensio as Ms. Nuñez
- JM Yosures as Oscar
- Adelle Ibarrientos as Andeng
- Vean Olmedo as Ivy
- Jomar Tañada as Dr. Ungria
- Brae Luke Quirante as Osborne
- Bodjie Pascua as Nanding
- Jim Paredes as Benigno Aquino Sr.
- Pinky Amador as Mrs. Esmeralda Argos
- Lovely Rivero as Aurora Aquino
- Tuesday Vargas as Miss Sugar
- Donita Nose as Tanya
- Sarah Javier as Rebecca Quijano
- Carla Lim as Jessa
- Brylle Mondejar as Mang Simeon
- Rhylle "Yang Yang" as Teen Bongbong Marcos
- Racel John "Geng" Cunanan as Imee Marcos

== Production ==
The original musical stage play was written by Vincent Tañada and commissioned by Corazon Aquino through the Benigno S. Aquino Jr. Foundation (now the Ninoy and Cory Aquino Foundation) in 2009. It was released shortly after her death in August 2009. Tañada said in a speech at the film's premiere that Aquino specifically requested that that Tañada "[should not] write only about us [the Aquino family]. Write also about our people." The stage play had over 500 shows all over the Philippines. Tañada decided to create a film adaptation of his stage play in 2022 as a response to the proliferation of historical distortion within the Philippines. He intended to make the film available for younger audiences to combat the increasing distortion against Aquino.

The stage play was originally developed together with historians, academics, and Corazon Aquino herself prior to her death. In writing the film, Tañada consulted historian Michael "Xiao" Chua, archivist Karl Patrick Suyat of Project Gunita, and Rebecca Quijano, who witnessed Aquino's assassination, to ensure the accuracy of scenes depicting historical events regarding Aquino, such as his assassination and his sentencing by a military commission to death. According to Chua, inaccuracies remained in the final film but the most important details were preserved.

Tañada considered actors Piolo Pascual and Jericho Rosales before choosing Juan Karlos Labajo to play Aquino in the film. Tañada chose Labajo to play the role of Aquino due to his young age and prior experience in singing. Pipo Cifra, a graduate of the University of Santo Tomas Conservatory of Music, was chosen by Tañada as the composer of the film. Cifra earlier collaborated with Tañada for Katips, a similar film detailing the life of activists during Marcos' martial law regime. Tañada served as the lyricist for the musical's songs, with the exception of Buwan, which was written and released by Labajo in 2018 and performed using a different rendition for the film.

In his premiere speech, Tañada also recalled attending the funeral of Ninoy Aquino as a child, who clung to the fabric of Aquino's hearse after being separated from his father. This scene is depicted in the movie, with Tañada's son, Peter Parker Tañada, playing as his father's younger self.

== Release ==
The film was premiered at the Power Plant Mall on February 18, 2022. Its premiere was attended by Aquino's daughter Viel Aquino-Dee, her son, Francis Joseph “Kiko” Aquino Dee, and Aquino's nephew Bam Aquino. At the premiere, Bam Aquino highlighted the importance of the film, noting the prevalence of disinformation regarding Ninoy Aquino.

The film was theatrically released on February 22, 2023. It was released exactly a week before the releases of two other historical films related to Ferdinand Marcos: Oras de Peligro, which tells the story of an impoverished family during the People Power Revolution, and Martyr or Murderer.

== Accolades ==
Year	Awards	Category	Recipient	Result	Ref.
2024	40th PMPC Star Awards for Movies	Indie Movie Musical Scorer of the Year	Pipo Cifra	Won	
