= Rekonek =

- Threatrical release poster
- Directed by: Jade Castro
- Written by: Jericho Aguado; Kat Naval; Leovic Arceta
- Produced by: Dondon Monteverde; Erik Matti; Gerald Anderson
- Starring: Gerald Anderson; Bela Padilla; Andrea Brillantes; Charlie Dizon; Zoren Legaspi; Carmina Villarroel; Cassy Legaspi; Mavy Legaspi; Gloria Diaz
- Cinematography: Carlos Mauricio
- Edited by: Abi Dango
- Music by: Alyana Cabral
- Production companies: Reality MM Studios; The Th3rd Floor Studios
- Distributed by: Reality MM Studios
- Release date: December 25, 2025
- Running time: 115 minutes
- Country: Philippines
- Language: Filipino
- Box office: ₱3 million

Rekonek (sometimes stylized as ReKonek) is a 2025 Philippine family drama film directed by Jade Castro under the production of Reality MM Studios and The Th3rd Floor Studios. The entry film for the 2025 Metro Manila Film Festival tackles how six separate families deals with a global internet outage ten days before Christmas.

== Cast ==
=== Main cast ===
- Gerald Anderson as Wes, part of a married couple story arc about drifting apart and reconnecting
- Bela Padilla as Trisha, an Overseas Filipino Worker (OFW) stranded abroad due to the global internet outage, trying to return home
- Andrea Brillantes as Gigi, Trisha’s friend and fellow OFW also affected by the outage
- Charlie Dizon as Kate, Wes’s wife in the family arc about marriage and connection
- Zoren Legaspi as Jordan, part of the Crowder family
- Carmina Villarroel as Bridget, Jordan’s wife in the Crowder family
- Cassy Legaspi as Eve, one of the Crowder children
- Mavy Legaspi as Derrick, one of the Crowder children
- Gloria Diaz as Cory, a grandmother figure who embraces life offline during the outage

=== Supporting cast ===
- Kelvin Miranda as Onyx
- Angel Guardian as Cheska
- Kokoy de Santos as Jasper
- Alexa Miro as Paula
- Raf Pineda as IT specialist
- Dom Corilla
- Soliman Cruz
- Eric Fructuoso as Gino
- Donna Cariaga
- Ellie Cruz
- Peewee O’Hara
- Josh Ivan Morales
- Prince Carlos as Will
- Tabs Sumulong
- Bon Andrew Lentejas
- Karl Medina
- Toniyuh
- Fonzi
- Gigi Locsin
- Sunshine Teodoro

== Production ==
Rekonek was directed by Jade Castro and produced by Reality MM Studios and The Th3rd Floor Studios. The film revolves around families dealing with an internet outage during the Christmas season – an idea conceptualized by Reality MM co-founder Erik Matti. Producer Gerald Anderson recalled that the inspiration for the story was "accidental" and happened during the filming for Buy Bust in Zambales when the production staff present in that film including Matti and Dondon Monteverde had difficulty contacting people from the shooting location due to poor internet connectivity.

Castro was initially "non-committal" to the project and was not keen to work on a Metro Manila Film Festival (MMFF) film. He eventually committed to the film due to find a Christmas film as fitting for the MMFF, an event which traditionally starts on December 25. The film was submitted as a script to the MMFF hence it was among the first four of eight entries announced in July 2025.

The film also marks as lead actor Gerald Anderson's debut as a producer. Part of the film was shot in Thailand.

== Release ==
Rekonek was released on December 25, 2025, in cinemas in the Philippines as one of the official eight entries of the 2025 Metro Manila Film Festival. It is the sole Christmas film in the film festival which kicks off on holiday.
