= Bulaga =

Bulaga may refer to:

- Eat Bulaga!, Philippine television variety show
  - List of Eat Bulaga! segments
- Eat Bulaga! Indonesia
- The New Eat Bulaga! Indonesia
- Bryan Bulaga (born 1989), American football offensive tackle of Polish descent
