= Toniyuh =

Filipino impressionist

- Born: Miggy Rivera
- Education: STI College (BA)
- Occupations: Impressionist; content creator; occasional actor
- Years active: 2018–present
- Known for: Celebrity impersonations

TikTok information
- Page: iamtoniyuh
- Genre: Comedy
- Followers: 442 thousand

Miggy Rivera, also known as Toniyuh, is a Filipino social media personality and impressionist known for impersonating celebrities through voice impressions and comedy videos on TikTok.

Rivera gained attention for a video in which he imitated several celebrities while singing the song "Ice Cream Yummy". He has appeared on television programs such as Dapat Alam Mo!, Eat Bulaga!, 24 Oras, The Boobay and Tekla Show, and Frontline Pilipinas. He has also appeared in the film Rekonek and the television series Apoy sa Dugo.

== Early life and education ==
Rivera graduated cum laude in 2023 with a Bachelor of Arts in Communication from STI College in Ortigas-Cainta.

Before becoming known for his online videos, he performed in theatrical productions. These included the Department of Trade and Industry's Tanghalang Pangmamimili in 2018 and Bakit Isa Lang ang Bituin sa Langit in 2019. He also received a Mandudula at Artista ng Bayan citation in Binangonan.

== Career ==
Rivera began creating online content by imitating television personality Toni Gonzaga, which inspired his screen name. He became widely known for a TikTok video in which he sang "Ice Cream Yummy" while switching between impressions of Gonzaga, Kathryn Bernardo, Leni Robredo, Alice Guo, and Kween Yasmin. In August 2025, the video had received more than 15.2 million views and 1.5 million likes.

In April 2025, Manila Bulletin listed Rivera among eight emerging Filipino content creators to watch. The publication also reported that he had worked with brands including Nestea, Puregold, DigiPlus, and Candy Corner Philippines. In August, Rivera joined Sphere Celebrity and Influencer Management.

Rivera made his television debut on GTV's Dapat Alam Mo!, where he impersonated Toni Gonzaga during the program's Ka-Voice segment. He later appeared on Eat Bulaga!, 24 Oras, The Boobay and Tekla Show, and Frontline Pilipinas. In 2025, he appeared in Rekonek, an entry in the 2025 Metro Manila Film Festival. In 2026, he joined the cast of the GMA afternoon television series Apoy sa Dugo.

== Advocacy ==
Rivera has expressed support for marginalized groups, including the LGBTQ community and older people. He has said that he wants to use his platform to entertain people and inspire others.

== Filmography ==
=== Film ===
Year	Title	Role	Ref.
2025	Rekonek		

=== Television ===
Year	Title	Role	Ref.
2025	Dapat Alam Mo!	Himself; celebrity impersonator	
2025	Eat Bulaga!	Himself	
2025	24 Oras	Himself	
2025	The Boobay and Tekla Show	Himself	
2025	Frontline Pilipinas	Himself	
2026	Apoy sa Dugo		
