= Tomas Gonzales =

Filipino actor and stand-up comedian

- Born: Tomas C. Gonzales II; November 15, 1969; Makati, Philippines
- Died: March 21, 2011 (aged 41); Makati, Philippines
- Other names: TG2, Tomas Kabayo
- Occupation: stand-up comedian
- Years active: 2009–2011

Tomas Gonzales was a Filipino actor and stand-up comedian.

== Early life ==
Born Tomas Casaclang Gonzales II or simply known as Tomas on November 15, 1969.

== Career ==
Tomas got his break as a mainstay in the GMA-7 primetime series "Beauty Queen," as Zuleyka Mamaril, the feisty personal assistant of the Rivases (Katrina Halili and Maggie Wilson). He was also part of the regular cast of the weekly show "Comedy Bar" also on GMA-7 until his death.

== Filmography ==
=== TV shows ===
Year	Title	Role
2010-2011	Comedy Bar	himself
2010-2011	Love ni Mister, Love ni Misis	segment co-host
2010	Kaya ng Powers	guest
2010	Asar Talo Lahat Panalo!	guest
2010-2011	Beauty Queen	Zuleyka Mamaril

=== Movie ===
Film	Title	Role	Note
2003	Mr. Suave	himself	This was the first Tomas' movie.
2011	Pak! Pak! My Dr. Kwak!	himself	This was the last Tomas' movie.

== Death ==
Stand-up comedian Tomas Gonzales II was found dead in his room Monday night. According to a report from "24 Oras" aired on Tuesday, March 22, Tomas died of a heart attack. Tomas was supposed to have a show at The Library Bar on Tuesday but the scheduled program was turned into a tribute and benefit show for the stand-up comedian. His remains lie in state at the Galang Memorial Homes in Makati.
