= Kier Legaspi =

Filipino actor

- Born: Christopher Lim Legaspi; January 1, 1973 (age 53); Manila, Philippines
- Occupations: Actor, host
- Years active: 1989–present
- Children: Danielle "Dani" Barretto
- Parent: Lito Legaspi (father)
- Relatives: Zoren Legaspi (brother); Brando Legaspi (brother); Cassy Legaspi and Mavy Legaspi (niece and nephew)

Christopher Lim Legaspi (born January 1, 1973), popularly known by his stage name Kier Legaspi, is a Filipino actor known for his villain roles in the '90s.

== Personal life ==
He is the younger brother of fellow actors Zoren Legaspi and Brando Legaspi (whose real name is "Kier Lim Legaspi", a name Christopher borrowed and used on-screen) and is also a son of veteran actor Lito Legaspi and Hershey. He has one daughter with actress Marjorie Barretto named Daniella (Dani). In 2019, Dani Barretto wed Xavi Panlilio with child Millie. In June 2024, Dani and Xavi confirmed their second child would be a boy, "To our Millie girl and our son, I’m yours forever."

== Filmography ==
=== Film ===
- Estudyante Blues (1989)
- Wooly Booly: Ang Classmate Kong Alien (1989)
- Hulihin Si... Nardong Toothpick (1990)
- Tootsie Wootsie: Ang Bandang Walang Atrasan (1990)
- Petrang Kabayo 2: Anong Ganda Mo! Mukha Kang Kabayo (1990) - Vincent
- Teacher's Enemy No. 1 (1990)
- Bikining Itim (1990)
- Noel Juico: Batang Kriminal (1991)
- Angelito San Miguel: Ang Batang City Jail (1991)
- Ang Utol Kong Hoodlum (1991)
- Miss Na Miss kita (Utol kong hoodlum II) (1992)
- Blue Jeans Gang (1992)
- Andres Manambit: Angkan Ng Matatapang (1994)
- Si Ayala at si Zobel (1994)
- Grepor Butch Belgica Story (1994)
- Biboy Banal: Pagganti Ko Tapos Kayo (1994)
- Chickboys (1994)
- Kahit Harangan Ng Bala (1995)
- Hatulan Bilibid Boys 2 (1995)
- Mangarap Ka (1995)
- Lablab Sa Paraiso (1996)
- Bossing (MMG Entertainment, 1996)
- Sa Aking mga Kamay (1996)
- Paracale Gang (1996)
- Mariano Mison... NBI (1997)
- Boy Chico: Hulihin Si Ben Tumbling (1997)
- Anak ni Boy Negro ( 1997)
- Ipaglaban Mo II: The Movie (1997)
- Init Ng Dugo ( 1998)
- Notoryus (1998)
- Braulio Tapang (1999)
- Di Puwedeng Hindi Puwede (1999)
- Isusumbong Kita sa Tatay Ko... (1999)
- Kapag Kumulo Ang Dugo (1999)
- Burador: Ang Babaing Sugo (2000)
- Bala Ko, Para Sa'Yo (2001)
- Masikip Sa Dibdib: The Boobita Rose Story (2004)
- Paraiso (Unitel Pictures, 2005)
- Isang Araw Lang (2013)
- Boy Golden: Shoot to Kill, the Arturo Porcuna Story (2013)
- Bad Boy 3: Bagani (2024)

=== Television ===
Year	Title	Role	Notes
1989–1990	That's Entertainment	Host/Performer	
1996	Maalaala Mo Kaya: Billards		
1999–2001	Saan Ka Man Naroroon	Dello	
2000	Maalaala Mo Kaya: Tulay		
2001	Tabing Ilog	Arthur	
2001–2002	Sana ay Ikaw na Nga		
2004	Maalaala Mo Kaya: Kutsilyo	Randy	
2005–2007	Daisy Siete	Kevin	
2007	Lupin	Sgt. Katas	
2007	Princess Charming	Ricardo de Saavedra	
2007	Sine Novela: Pati Ba Pintig ng Puso	Dr. Franco	
2008	Lobo	Nicholas Raymundo	
2009	Darna	Anton	
2010	Bantatay	Baldo	
2010	Tanging Yaman	Emil Jacinto	
2010	Maalaala Mo Kaya: Larawan II	Henry	
2010	Rosalka	Jhun Dimaano	
2011	Ikaw Lang ang Mamahalin	Joel	
2011	Wansapanataym: Unli-Gift Box	Rodel	
2013	Mundo Mo'y Akin	Romy Alvarez	
2013	Akin Pa Rin ang Bukas	Brando Morales	
2013	Genesis	Jomar	
2014	Panalangin	Teddy	
2015	Second Chances	Emman	
2015	Maynila: Bilango ng Kahapon		
2015	Beautiful Strangers	Rigor Lacsamana	
2018	My Guitar Princess	Elvis Soriano	
2018	Onanay	Joel	
2023	Black Rider	Sonny	
2024	FPJ's Batang Quiapo	P/BGen. Michael Peralta	
