= Tahanang Pinakamasaya =

2024 Philippine television variety show

- Title card
- Genre: Variety show
- Written by: Erin de Jesus; Patricia Arroyo; Ron Comon
- Directed by: Moty Apostol
- Creative director: Renato Aure Jr.
- Presented by: Alexa Miro; Arra San Agustin; Betong Sumaya; Buboy Villar; Cassy Legaspi; Chariz Solomon; Dasuri Choi; Glaiza de Castro; Isko Moreno; Kimpoy Feliciano; Kokoy de Santos; Mavy Legaspi; Michael Sager; Paolo Contis; Winwyn Marquez; Yasser Marta
- Narrated by: Show Suzuki
- Opening theme: "Tahanang Pinakamasaya!"
- Country of origin: Philippines
- Original language: Tagalog
- No. of episodes: 50

Production
- Executive producers: Helen Atienza-Dela Cruz; Maricel Carampatana-Vinarao; Michael Dio
- Producers: Seth Frederick Jalosjos; Soraya Jalosjos
- Production locations: APT Studios, Cainta, Rizal, Philippines
- Camera setup: Multiple-camera setup
- Running time: 150–180 minutes
- Production company: TAPE Inc.

Original release
- Network: GMA Network
- Release: January 6 – March 2, 2024

Tahanang Pinakamasaya! (transl. happiest home!) is a 2024 Philippine television variety show broadcast by GMA Network. Directed by Moty Apostol, it stars Alexa Miro, Arra San Agustin, Betong Sumaya, Buboy Villar, Cassy Legaspi, Chariz Solomon, Dasuri Choi, Glaiza de Castro, Isko Moreno, Kimpoy Feliciano, Kokoy de Santos, Mavy Legaspi, Michael Sager, Paolo Contis, Winwyn Marquez, Yasser Marta, Music Hero Band and BPop Idols. It premiered on January 6, 2024 on the network's afternoon line up. The show concluded on March 2, 2024, with a total of 50 episodes.

The show is streaming online on YouTube.

== Overview ==
The formation of Tahanang Pinakamasaya! dated back from an internal dispute between TAPE Inc.'s new management and the group of hosts of Eat Bulaga! – Joey de Leon, Tito Sotto and Vic Sotto. Eat Bulaga! suspended its production, after the hosts and production members filed their resignation on May 31, 2023. GMA Network aired previously aired episodes of Eat Bulaga! under its deal with TAPE Inc. from May 31 to June 3, 2023. It resulted to copyright infringement and unfair competition case filed by de Leon, Tito Sotto and Vic Sotto, at the Marikina City Regional Trial Court on June 30, 2023. On June 5, the show resumed original programming, with Paolo Contis, Alexa Miro, Cassy Legaspi, Mavy Legaspi, Betong Sumaya and Buboy Villar serving as the new hosts of the show. In the same month, Isko Moreno, Kimpoy Feliciano and South Korean dancer Dasuri Choi also joined the show. TAPE Inc. claimed that they were the owners of the "Eat Bulaga!" trademark, stating that they "remain" as the same variety show created in 1979. The court ruled that they did not originate the term "Eat Bulaga!", and they registered its trademark in "bad faith", due to de Leon being the creator of the term.

On December 4, 2023, the Intellectual Property Office of the Philippines granted the petition of de Leon, Tito Sotto and Vic Sotto to cancel TAPE Inc.'s trademark registration of "Eat Bulaga!", stating the former have the right to its registration. On December 22, 2023, the Marikina City Regional Trial Court branch 273, directed TAPE Inc., to pay ₱2 million in temperate damages, ₱500,000 Philippine pesos in exemplary damages and an additional ₱500,000 in attorney's fees to plaintiffs Tito Sotto, Vic Sotto, de Leon and their creative partner, Jenny Ferre, for committing unfair competition and copyright infringement. A permanent injunction was given to TAPE Inc. and GMA Network, prohibiting the usage of the term "Eat Bulaga!", including its logos, songs, promos, segments and footage recorded before May 31, 2023, for its forthcoming programming.

On January 6, 2024, TAPE Inc. relaunched their variety show as Tahanang Pinakamasaya!. On March 2, 2024, the show concluded its original programming as a result of low television ratings. Previously broadcast episodes were re-aired from March 4 to 7.

== Cast ==
Cast

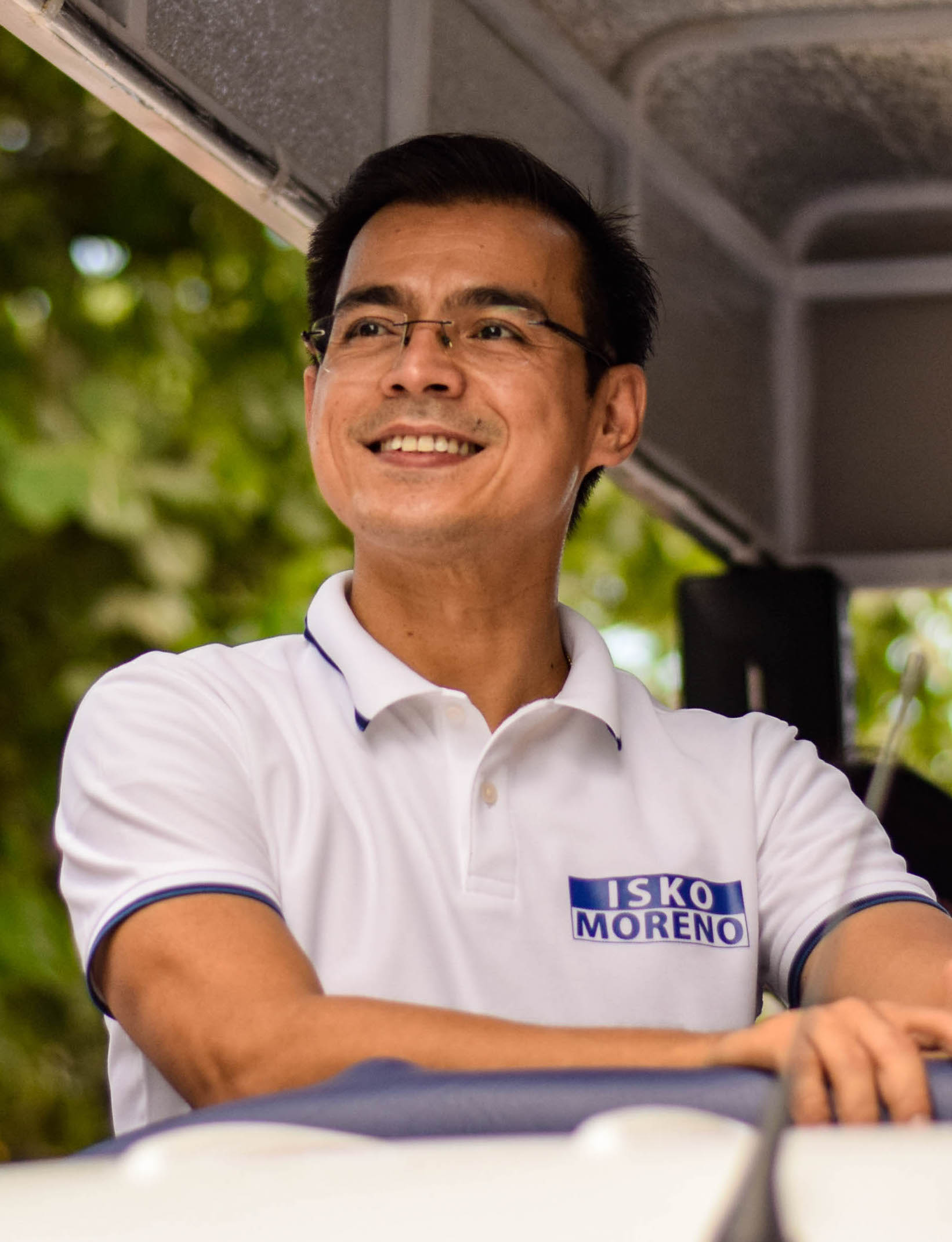
Isko Moreno

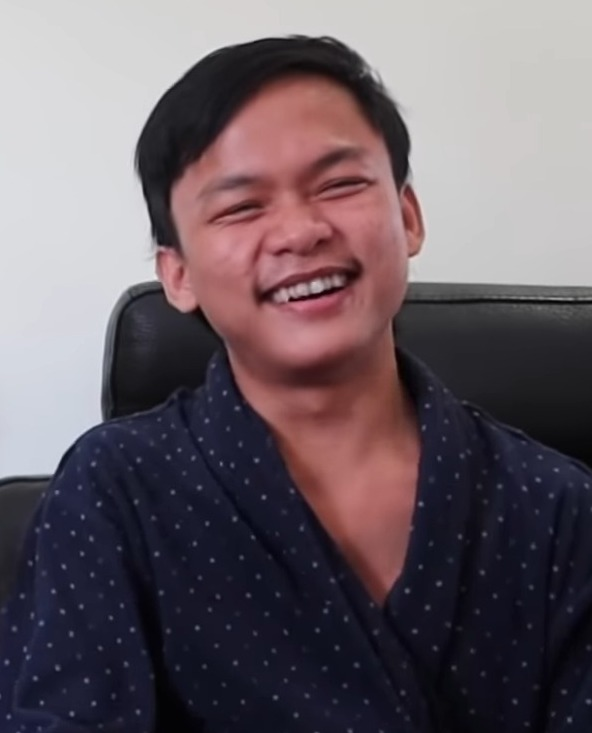
Buboy Villar

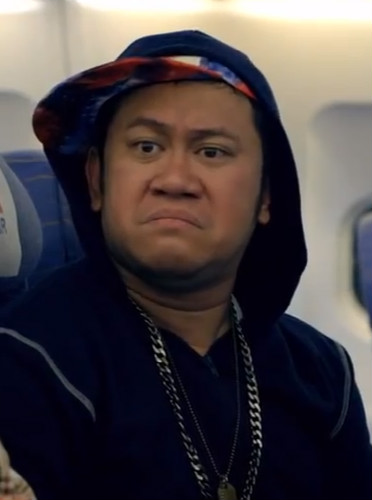
Betong Sumaya

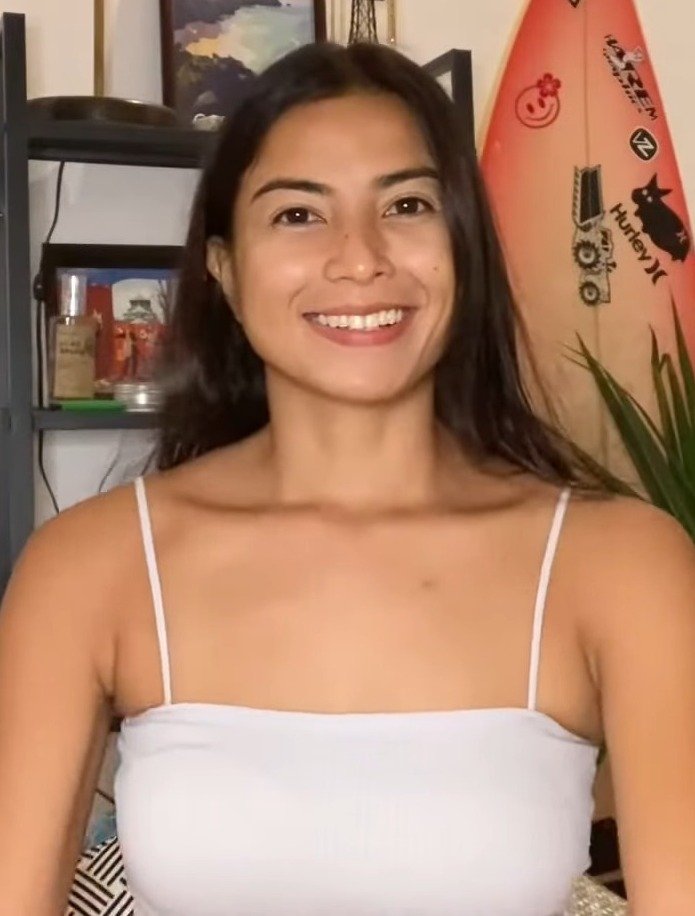
Glaiza de Castro

- Alexa Miro
- Arra San Agustin
- Betong Sumaya
- Buboy Villar
- Cassy Legaspi
- Chariz Solomon
- Dasuri Choi
- Glaiza de Castro
- Isko Moreno
- Kimpoy Feliciano
- Kokoy de Santos
- Mavy Legaspi
- Michael Sager
- Paolo Contis
- Winwyn Marquez
- Yasser Marta
- BPop Idols
- Music Hero Band

== Ratings ==
According to AGB Nielsen Philippines' Nationwide Urban Television Audience Measurement People in television homes, the pilot episode of Tahanang Pinakamasaya! earned a 3.2% rating. The final episode scored a 2.8% rating.
