= Jenny Tan =

Indonesian television presenter (born 1981)

- Born: Jenny Tan; May 21, 1981 (age 44); Jakarta, Indonesia
- Other names: Jenny
- Occupations: News anchor, TV host
- Years active: 2007–present
- Known for: Presenter Fokus on Indosiar

Jenny Tan (born May 21, 1981 in Jakarta) is an Indonesian television presenter who became anchor of the news program Fokus Indosiar.

== Career ==
Tan worked as news anchor from November 1, 2007 to November 30, 2011 at Indosiar carried news of Fokus Pagi, Fokus Siang and Fokus malam.

She is now presenter of the Infotainment program Hot Shot on SCTV. and co host of Eat Bulaga! Indonesia on SCTV.

== TV programs ==
- Fokus Pagi (Indosiar, 2007–2011)
- Kisi-Kisi (Indosiar, 2009–2011)
- Hot Shot (SCTV, 2012–present)
- Eat Bulaga! Indonesia (SCTV, 2012–2014)
- Gang Senggol (MNCTV, 2014–2015)
