= General Luna (band) =

Filipino girl rock band

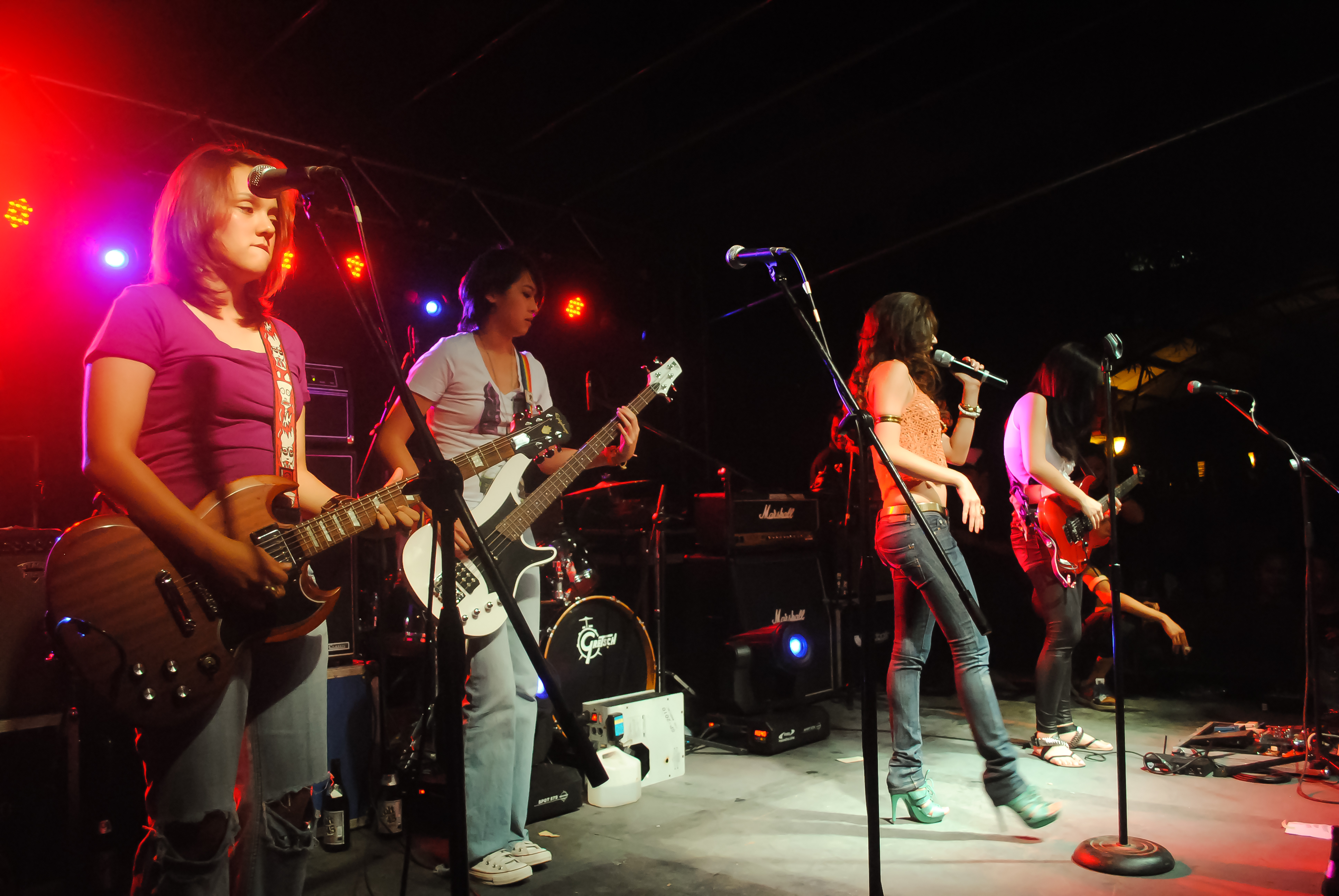

Background information
- Origin: Manila, Philippines
- Genres: OPM, rock
- Years active: 2010–2013
- Label: Warner Music Philippines, Inc.
- Past members: Alexis Montemayor; Audry Dionisio; Bea Lao; Caren Tevanny K. Mangaran; Nicole Laurel Asensio

General Luna was an all-girl Filipino rock band. The lineup consisted of Nicole Laurel Asensio on vocals, Caren Mangaran on lead guitar, Audry Dionisio on rhythm guitar, Alex Montemayor on bass guitar, and Bea Lao on drums.

General Luna was a Filipino all-female rock band formed in Manila in 2010. The group consisted of vocalist Nicole Laurel Asensio, lead guitarist Caren Mangaran, rhythm guitarist Audry Dionisio, bassist Alexis Montemayor, and drummer Bea Lao. The band was signed to Warner Music Philippines and released its self-titled debut album in 2010, featuring songs such as "Red Heaven", "Nandito", and "Maria". The group later released its second album, Different Corners, in 2012. General Luna became inactive after its original run, and Asensio subsequently pursued a solo career.

Nicole Laurel Asensio is "the daughter of singer Iwi Laurel, first cousin of actress Denise Laurel, niece of theater artist Cocoy Laurel, and granddaughter of famed opera singer Fides Cuyugan-Asensio." She is also the granddaughter of singer Celia Diaz Laurel. Asensio was the leading lady on Abra's song "Diwata". In 2014, Asensio announced that the group was currently inactive and that she would be pursuing a solo career.

== Discography ==
=== Studio albums ===
- General Luna (2010)
- Different Cornerx (2012)

=== Singles ===
- "Red Heaven"
- "Nandito"
- "Maria"
- "Tila"
- "Different Corners"
- "Santa Baby"

== Awards and nominations ==
| Year | Award giving body | Category | Nominated work | Results |
|---|---|---|---|---|
| 2010 | NU Rock Awards | Vocalist of the Year | (for Nicole Laurel Asensio) | Nominated |

== Bibliography ==
- "General Luna launches album". Manila Bulletin. September 9, 2010. Archived from the original on September 24, 2015 – via HighBeam Research.
