= Sarap, 'Di Ba? =

Philippine television talk show

- Title card from 2022 to 2024
- Also known as: Sarap Diva (Note: 2012–18.)
- Genre: Talk show
- Written by: MJ Bolaño
- Directed by: Treb Monteras II; Louie Ignacio; Zoren Legaspi
- Presented by: Regine Velasquez; Carmina Villarroel; Mavy Legaspi; Cassy Legaspi
- Theme music composer: Jem Florendo
- Opening theme: "Sarap 'Di Ba?" by Antonette Tismo
- Country of origin: Philippines
- Original language: Tagalog

Production
- Executive producer: Gina Dy-Quizon
- Production locations: Studio 4, GMA Network Center, Quezon City, Philippines
- Editors: Mark Andrew Antonio; Michael Revilla
- Camera setup: Multiple-camera setup
- Running time: 23–26 minutes
- Production company: GMA Entertainment Group

Original release
- Network: GMA Network
- Release: October 6, 2012 – September 28, 2024

Sarap, 'Di Ba? (transl. delicious, isn't it?), formerly Sarap Diva, is a Philippine television cooking talk show broadcast by GMA Network. Originally directed by Treb Monteras II, it was originally hosted by Regine Velasquez. It premiered on October 6, 2012, as Sarap Diva on the network's Saturday morning line up. It premiered on October 20, 2018, as Sarap, 'Di Ba?. Louie Ignacio served as director and Carmina Villarroel, Mavy Legaspi, and Cassy Legaspi served as the final hosts. The show concluded on September 28, 2024.

The show is streaming online on YouTube.

== Overview ==
Sarap Diva premiered on October 6, 2012, with Regine Velasquez serving as the host. On October 13, 2018, after the 6th anniversary special, Velasquez left the show. The following week, the show was rebranded as Sarap, 'Di Ba?, with Carmina Villarroel, Mavy Legaspi and Cassy Legaspi as hosts.

== Cast ==
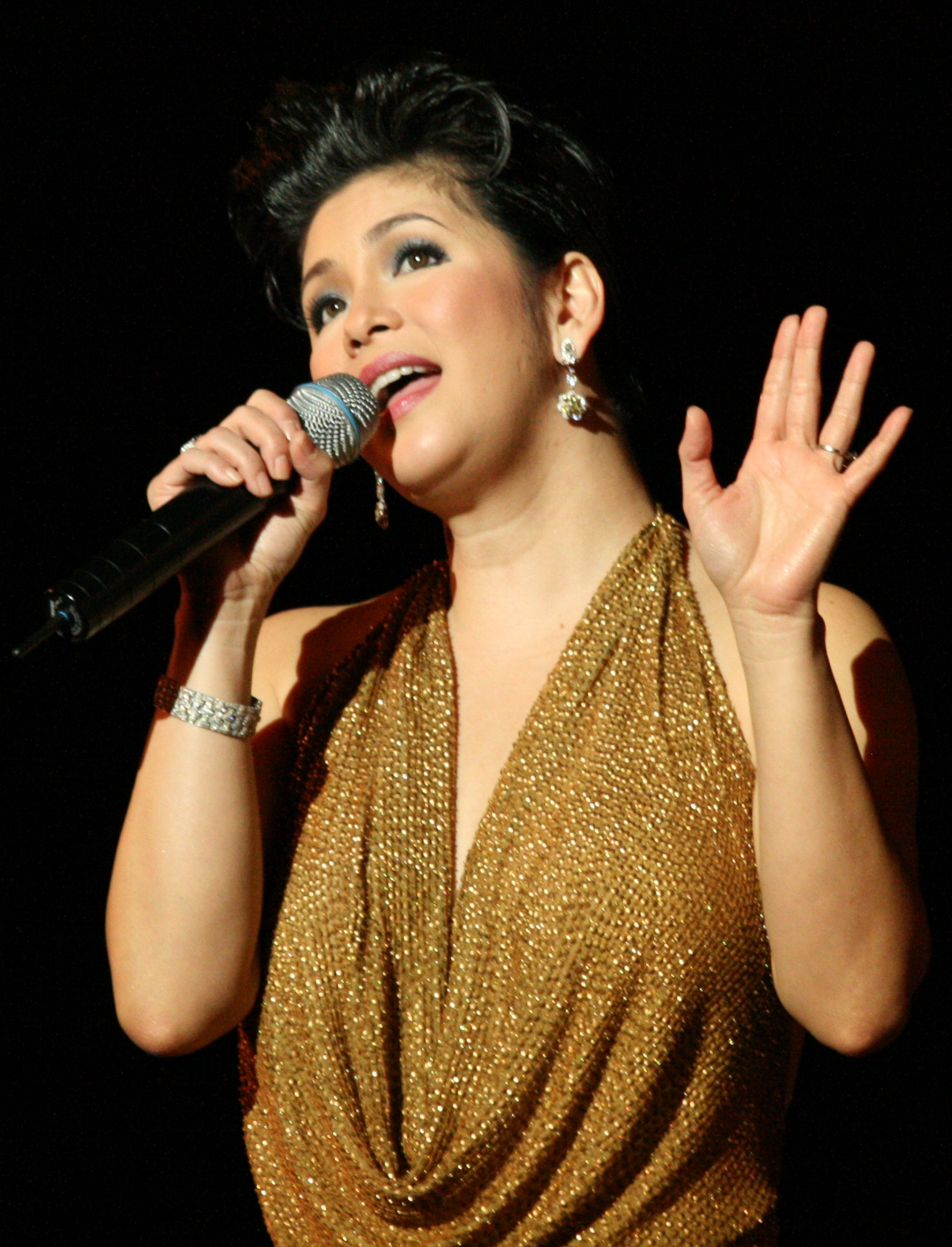
Regine Velasquez served as the host from 2012 to 2018.

- Regine Velasquez (2012–18)
- Terry Gian as Inday (2012–18)
- Carmina Villarroel (2018–24)
- Mavy Legaspi (2018–24)
- Cassy Legaspi (2018–24)

== Production ==
In March 2020, the admission of a live audience in the studio and production were suspended due to the enhanced community quarantine in Luzon by the COVID-19 pandemic. The show resumed its programming on July 18, 2020.

== Ratings ==
According to AGB Nielsen Philippines' Mega Manila household television ratings, the pilot episode of Sarap Diva earned a 10.1% rating. Based from People in television homes, the pilot episode of Sarap, 'Di Ba? earned a 5.2% rating.

== Accolades ==
Accolades received by Sarap Diva
Year	Award	Category	Recipient	Result	Ref.
2013	27th PMPC Star Awards for Television	Best Celebrity Talk Show	Sarap Diva	Nominated	
2013	27th PMPC Star Awards for Television	Best Celebrity Talk Show Host	Regine Velasquez	Nominated	
2014	Golden Screen TV Awards	Outstanding Lifestyle Program	Sarap Diva	Nominated	
2014	Golden Screen TV Awards	Outstanding Lifestyle Program Host	Regine Velasquez	Nominated	
2016	30th PMPC Star Awards for Television	Best Celebrity Talk Show	Sarap Diva	Nominated	
2016	30th PMPC Star Awards for Television	Best Celebrity Talk Show Host	Regine Velasquez	Nominated	

Accolades received by Sarap, 'Di Ba?
Year	Award	Category	Recipient	Result	Ref.
2019	Anak TV Seal Awards		Sarap, 'Di Ba?	Won	
2019	33rd PMPC Star Awards for Television	Best Celebrity Talk Show	Sarap, 'Di Ba?	Nominated	
2019	33rd PMPC Star Awards for Television	Best Celebrity Talk Show Host	Carmina Villarroel Cassy Legaspi Mavy Legaspi	Nominated	
2021	34th PMPC Star Awards for Television	Best Celebrity Talk Show	Sarap, 'Di Ba?	Nominated	
2021	34th PMPC Star Awards for Television	Best Celebrity Talk Show Host	Carmina Villarroel Cassy Legaspi Mavy Legaspi	Nominated	
2023	35th PMPC Star Awards for Television	Best Celebrity Talk Show	Sarap, 'Di Ba?	Nominated	
2023	35th PMPC Star Awards for Television	Best Celebrity Talk Show Host	Carmina Villarroel Cassy Legaspi Mavy Legaspi	Nominated	
