= Dasuri Choi =

South Korean entertainer

- Born: Choi Da-seul; Seoul, South Korea
- Other name: Dasuri
- Occupations: Entertainer; dancer; singer; actress
- Years active: 2004–present
- Agent(s): ABS-CBN (2009, 2013); GMA Network (since 2014); TV5 (since 2024)

Korean name
- Hangul: 최다슬
- RR: Choe Daseul
- MR: Ch'oe Tasŭl

Choi Da-seul (Korean: 최다슬), popularly known as Dasuri Choi, is a South Korean dancer and entertainer based in the Philippines. She won Best in Talent and was the second runner-up in the segment "You're My Foreignay" on the longest-running Philippine noontime show Eat Bulaga!.

== Biography ==
Choi was born in Seoul, South Korea.

Dasuri Choi is a former dancer of 홍영주 (Hong Yeong-ju) dance team from 2004 to 2006, Step-up from 2007 to 2009, Yama & Hotchicks from 2009 to 2010, and the Dance Trainee (choreographer) profession in South Korea.

In 2014, Choi auditioned on Eat Bulaga! on the segment "You're My Foreignay", together with fellow Korean actress Kuk Son-young, who was the grand winner of the segment. Choi was a guest co-host on the TV program Day Off from 2015 to 2019. She also appeared in the September 2015 issue of FHM Philippines.

In 2023, Dasuri was a co-host on TAPE Inc.'s variety show Tahanang Pinakamasaya!, an iteration of Eat Bulaga! amid a trademark dispute. The show was cancelled in 2024.

== Controversies ==
On July 11, 2023, Choi experienced a nipple slip incident during the segment "Dance Pa More Tuesday" on Tahanang Pinakamasaya!

On February 26, 2024, Choi denied claims and rumors linking her to the breakup of Mavy Legaspi and Kyline Alcantara.

== Filmography ==
=== Television ===
| Year | Title | Role |
|---|---|---|
| 2014 | Picture! Picture! | Trivia commentator |
| 2014 | Eat Bulaga! | Regular performer / "You're My Foreignay" Mindanao Winner |
| 2014 | Marian | Guest performer |
| 2014; 2021 | Tunay Na Buhay | |
| 2015 | Move It: Clash of the Streetdancers | Guest performer |
| 2015 | Sunday All Stars | Guest performer / Host |
| 2015–2019 | Day Off | Guest co-host |
| 2016 | Pepito Manaloto | Park Ka-ren |
| 2017 | My Korean Jagiya | Film actress |
| 2017 | Road Trip | Herself |
| 2018 | Inday Will Always Love You | Tourist |
| 2018 | Tadhana | Yi Jeon |
| 2022–2023 | Bubble Gang | Co-host |
| 2023–2024 | Tahanang Pinakamasaya | Co-host |
| 2025 | Stars on the Floor | Contestant |

=== Music video ===
| Year | Song title | Artist | Studio |
|---|---|---|---|
| 2015 | "You're The Only One" | Dasuri Choi | |

== Awards ==
Television
| Year | Awards |
|---|---|
| 2014 | 2nd Runner-up – You're My Foreignay |
| 2014 | Dabarkad's Choice Award |
| 2014 | You're My Foreignay – Mindanao Weekly Finalist |
| 2012 | 20th Asian Pacific Awards, Young Female Artist |
| 2011 | 19th Annual Asia Pacific Excellence Award And Asian Entertainer Award |
| 2011 | Asian Entertainer Awardee Outstanding Korean Female Performer |
| 2011 | 30th Dangal Ng Bayan Awards Young Pop Female Artist |
| 2011 | 13th Global Excellence & Global Brand Awards, Outstanding Young Female Performing Korean Artist |
| 2010 | National Consumer Affairs Foundation and People's Choice Awards Committee |
| 2010 | People's Choice for Entertainment Outstanding Young Asian Performing Artist Awardee |
