= Carren Eistrup =

Filipino singer (born 2009)

- Born: Carren Kaye Emol Eistrup Frederiksen; February 5, 2009 (age 17); Cebu City, Philippines
- Other name: Kaye
- Occupations: Singer; model; television host
- Years active: 2017–present
- Agent: Merlion Entertainment

Carren Kaye Emol Eistrup Frederiksen (born February 5, 2009) is a Filipino singer. She gained prominence as the grand winner of the Bida Next competition and subsequently secured a role as a co-host on the Philippine television show Eat Bulaga!. She is also noted for her resemblance to singer Miley Cyrus.

== Personal life ==
Carren Eistrup was born as Carren Kaye Emol Eistrup Frederiksen on February 5, 2009, in Cebu City, to a Danish father and a Filipino mother. Eistrup and her two elder brothers were solely raised by their mother, and it had been over a decade since she last saw her father who lived in Denmark. At the age of four, her mother discovered her singing talent through workshops, and she began playing piano and guitar at seven. During the pandemic, she launched her YouTube channel for song covers and livestream. Eistrup is a consistent academic awardee and student leader at Starland International School, where she has proven her ability to manage work and studies effectively. She studied senior high school at Treston International College.

== Career ==
In June 2018, nine-year-old Eistrup debuted on Eat Bulaga! as a contestant in the talent competition "Hype Kang Bata Ka!", where she finished as a grand finalist and in the same year, she won eight gold medals and seven division championship plaques at the World Championships of Performing Arts (WCOPA) held in Long Beach, California. In February 2023, she was named the grand winner of Eat Bulaga! segment, "Bida Next" making her the newest member of the noontime show, followed by the release of her debut digital album, "Bida Next," alongside co-finalists Kimpoy Feliciano and Sheena Palad. In March 2023, she was given her own segment, "Carren Sings".

Eistrup confirmed her resignation from TAPE Inc. on June 8, 2023, to join TV5's noontime program, E.A.T. led by Tito Sotto, Vic Sotto, and Joey de Leon. Later on, the program was rebranded as Eat Bulaga! where her career began, after TVJ won their trademark dispute against TAPE Inc. on January 6, 2024.

== Filmography ==
=== Television ===
Year	Title	Role	Note(s)	Ref.
2017	It's Showtime	Herself (contestant)	Segment: "Tawag ng Tanghalan Kids"	
2017	Little Big Shots	Herself (contestant)		
2018	Eat Bulaga!	Herself (contestant)	Segment: "Hype Kang Bata Ka!"	
2020	Centerstage	Herself (contestant)		
2023, 2024–present	Eat Bulaga!	Herself (co-host)		
2023–2024	E.A.T...	Herself (co-host)		

== Discography ==
=== Studio-digital album ===
List of Studio-digital albums, with selected details
Title	Details
Bida Next	Primary Artists: Carren Eistrup, Kimpoy Feliciano, Sheena Palad; Released: March 17, 2023; Label: Curve Entertainment, Inc.; Format: Digital download

=== Singles ===
List of singles showing year released
Title	Year	Label
"Tibok (Heto Na Ba 'Yon?)"	2025	PolyEast Records
"Ngiti"	2026	PolyEast Records
"Kolorete"	2026	PolyEast Records
