= Cassy Legaspi =

Filipino actress

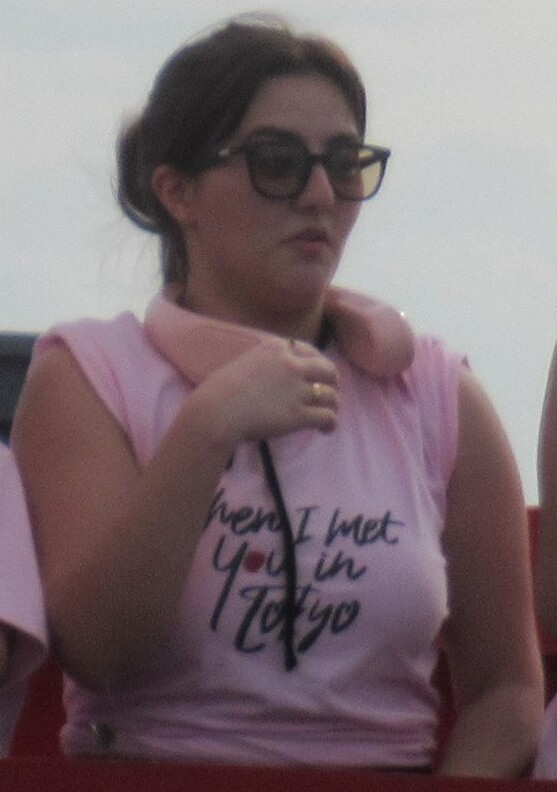
- Legaspi in 2023
- Born: Maria Cassandra Villarroel Legaspi; January 6, 2001 (age 25); Los Angeles, California, U.S.
- Occupation: Actress
- Years active: 2003–present
- Agent: Sparkle GMA Artist Center (2018–present)
- Parents: Zoren Legaspi (father); Carmina Villarroel (mother)
- Relatives: Mavy Legaspi (twin brother); Kier Legaspi (uncle)

Maria Cassandra "Cassy" Villarroel Legaspi (Tagalog: [ˈkasi lɛˈgaspɪ]; born January 6, 2001) is a Filipino actress.

Legaspi is known for her roles in the films Ako si Ninoy and When I Met You in Tokyo (both 2023), the latter of which earned her nominations for New Movie Actress at the Star Awards for Movies and Best Supporting Actress at the Luna Awards. She also starred in the television dramas First Yaya and First Lady.

== Early life and education ==
Legaspi was born on January 6, 2001, in Los Angeles, California. She is the daughter of actors Zoren Legaspi and Carmina Villarroel, and has a twin brother, Mavy Legaspi. She is the great-granddaughter of actor Lito Legaspi, and the niece of actors Brando Legaspi and Kier Legaspi.

Legaspi moved to the Philippines with her family when she was three months old. In 2019, she graduated from Reedley International School in Pasig.

== Career ==
Legaspi began her career by appearing in commercials alongside her twin brother Mavy. At three years old, she starred in a commercial for Nido Milk. She also appeared in various Philippine television shows as a child, including S-Files, Kris TV, KC Show, ASAP, Day Off, SiS, and Pepito Manaloto.

In 2016, she was a contestant in the reality television show Lip Sync Battle Philippines. In 2018, she appeared in Studio 7 and co-hosted Sarap, 'Di Ba? along with her mother and brother. The same year, Legaspi signed a contract with GMA Artist Center (now Sparkle) as well as GMA Network.

In 2021, she made her television debut and starred as Nina Acosta in First Yaya. She reprised the role in the series' 2022 sequel, First Lady.. She has made guest appearances in several television shows on GMA Network, including All-Out Sundays, Eat Bulaga!, Regal Studio Presents, Abot-Kamay na Pangarap, Magpakailanman and Tahanang Pinakamasaya. She has also appeared on ABS-CBN's daytime program It's Showtime.

She starred as Ingrid in the 2023 musical drama Ako Si Ninoy and as Hannah in the 2023 romance drama film When I Met You in Tokyo.

== Personal life ==
In 2025, Legaspi revealed that she had been diagnosed with hypothyroidism.

== Awards and recognition ==
In 2021, Legaspi was a recipient of German Moreno Youth Achievement Awards.

In 2012, 2013, 2014, 2015, the Eduk Circle Awards recognized the Legaspi family as the Most Influential Endorser and inducted them to its Hall of Fame in 2016.

== Filmography ==
=== Film ===
| Year | Title | Role | Notes |
|---|---|---|---|
| 2022 | Ako si Ninoy | Ingrid | |
| 2023 | When I Met You in Tokyo | Hannah | |

=== Television ===
| Year | Title | Role | Notes |
|---|---|---|---|
| 2011 | Amazing Cooking Kids | Herself | Guest appearance |
| 2018 | Lip Sync Battle Philippines | Herself | Contestant |
| 2018–2019 | Studio 7 | Herself | Performer / Co-host |
| 2018–2024 | Sarap, 'Di Ba? | Herself | Co-host |
| 2020–2021 | All-Out Sundays | Herself | Performer / Co-host |
| 2021 | First Yaya | Nina Acosta | Main cast |
| 2022 | First Lady | Nina Acosta | Main cast |
| 2023–2024 | Eat Bulaga! | Herself | Co-host |
| 2023 | Abot-Kamay na Pangarap | Jewel Mendoza | Guest role |
| 2024 | Tahanang Pinakamasaya | Herself | Co-host |
| 2024–2025 | It's Showtime | Herself | Guest / Performer |
| 2025–2026 | Hating Kapatid | Isabelle "Belle" Almendras | Main Cast |
| TBA | Whispers from Heaven | | |

=== Anthologies ===
| Year | Title | Role | Notes |
|---|---|---|---|
| 2023 | Regal Studio Presents | Michelle | Episode: My Father's Song |
| 2023 | Magpakailanman | Dalia | Episode: Sana Muling Makapiling |
| 2024 | Regal Studio Presents | Polly | Episode: Fishing for Love |
