= Katips =

2021 Filipino period musical drama

- Theatrical release poster
- Directed by: Vincent M. Tañada
- Written by: Vincent M. Tañada
- Based on: Katips: Ang Mga Bagong Katipunero by Vince Tañada
- Produced by: Base Hernandez; Ronnie Rodillas
- Starring: Jerome Ponce; Vince Tañada; Mon Confiado; Sachzna Laparan; Nicole Laurel Asensio
- Cinematography: Pandoy Abanto
- Edited by: Mark Jason Sucgang
- Music by: Pipo Cifra
- Production company: Philstagers Films
- Release dates: November 27, 2021 (Gateway Mall); August 3, 2022
- Running time: 142 minutes
- Country: Philippines
- Language: Filipino
- Budget: P300,000

Katips, also known as Katips: The Movie, is a 2021 Philippine historical musical drama film written and directed by Vincent M. Tañada. Based on Tañada's 2016 stage musical of the same name, it is about a group of student activists from the Katipunan area of Quezon City who struggle to protest the imposition of nationwide martial law in the 1970s. The film stars Jerome Ponce, Vince Tañada, Mon Confiado, Sachzna Laparan and Nicole Laurel Asensio, alongside an ensemble cast that includes Dexter Doria, Lou Veloso, Johnrey Rivas, Adelle Ibarrientos and Joshua Bulot.

Katips was first screened for the press at Gateway Mall in Quezon City on November 27, 2021, then screened for the public on December 3. It was originally intended to be part of the 2021 Metro Manila Film Festival, but it was left out of the final list of entries. It was re-released again in August 3, 2022, to combat the release of Maid in Malacañang. The film received positive reviews from audience and critics. Additionally, the film received 17 FAMAS Award nominations, the most out of any film in 2021, and won seven, including Best Picture, Best Director (Tañada), Best Actor (Tañada) and Best Supporting Actor (Rivas).

== Plot ==
A man walks into a museum for its inauguration and is greeted by Lira, a guide. The main story of Katips is presented as Lira's tour of the museum and as a retrospective story written by the museum curator for a book.

In the 1970s, Greg, Panyong, Art, Alet, Estong, and Susie, all members of various student organizations, host and attend a picket rally, along with members of the Catholic Church, Sister Claire and Sister Josie. The rally denounced the government of the incumbent Philippine President, Apo (an allegory for Ferdinand Marcos), and was part of the beginning of the First Quarter Storm. Ka Manding arrives at the rally after a meeting where they stated their demands to government officials: a non-partisan constitutional convention, among others. He tells a few others about his daughter who was returning to the Philippines from the United States after the death of her mother. A team of METROPOL (METROCOM) soldiers led by Lieutenant Sales arrive at the rally, arresting Ka Manding for sedition and rebellion. While driving away, they strangle Ka Manding and, after ensuring there are no witnesses, throw his body down a cliff. The soldiers later return at night, beating the protestors with batons and blasting them with high-pressure water from a fire truck.

Some time after the imposition of Martial Law, Greg meets the daughter of Ka Manding, Lara, at the University of the Philippines. They collect some of Ka Manding's personal belongings from his apartment and head to a safe haven for students who were still outside past curfew: the Katips house, operated by Alet. Meanwhile, Art the photographer of the Philippine Collegian introduces Lally to the writers of the paper, consisting of Bebang, Susie, and Panyong, who also works as a writer for Ang Bayan, the newsletter of the Communist Party of the Philippines. With the curfew nearing, the writers rush home. While making his way to the Katips house, Panyong narrowly escapes capture from METROPOL officers. After Panyong rants about American influence on the Philippines, Lara enters a heated discussion with him, defending the imposition of martial law and showing support for Apo. Meanwhile, Art introduces Lally to his father, Mang Temyong, a supporter of Apo and a Metro Manila Aide who sweeps the streets of Manila to appease Imelda. Alet, after fighting with Lara about their differing perspectives on life as a Philippine citizen, tells the story of her love interest, Ben, a desaparecido who disappeared after attending a mass action protest. They then explain the death of Ka Manding to Lara, who then joins their cause.

The main cast assemble again in front of a distillery, La Disilleria, to protest unfair labor practices. During dinner, Alet touts at Panyong for being numb towards her; Panyong defended himself and admits his love for her. The following day, METROPOL officers arrive at the picket, again attacking demonstrators and arresting Art and Estong. The protesters are distraught at the encounter, which left the two arrested missing as they could not be found in nearby precincts. Some time later, Panyong and Greg begin packing to return to the mountains as guerilla soldiers of the New People's Army. Alet is kidnapped by a METROPOL soldier and brought to a torture house. Art and Estong are both shown being brutally tortured by METROPOL officers; they are burned by cigarettes and flat irons, made to sit on ice blocks, had nails removed with pliers, urinated on, and electrocuted. Alet is beaten by Sales, who reveals that Ben is alive and that he had betrayed her as part of his job. Alet is raped by Sales, and all three captured are shot dead. After learning of the discovery of her mutilated corpse, Greg led Panyong to her body, which was found at the side of a river. Panyong swears revenge against the perpetrators and heads to the mountains with Greg. Years later, during the People Power Revolution, Lara takes Alet's place as the caretaker of the Katips house. As she reads from the Malaya that Greg and Panyong had died, Greg, who had been mistakenly presumed dead, returns home to her and their son, Greggy.

At the present day, Greggy is revealed to be the museum visitor and a lawyer for Claimants 1081, an organization of martial law victims. Panyong, also mistakenly presumed dead, is the museum curator. The student activists in the 1970s, now elderly, arrive at the inauguration of the museum: the Bantayog ng mga Bayani, dedicated to the victims of human rights abuses during martial law.

== Cast ==
- Jerome Ponce as Gregorio "Greg" Lagusnilad / Greggy Jr.
  - Marc Rolan Mendoza as young Greggy Jr.
- Vince Tañada as Panyong
- Mon Confiado as Lt. Sales
- Sachzna Laparan as Lira
- Nicole Laurel Asensio as Lara Quimpo
- Dexter Doria as Sr. Claire
- Lou Veloso as Mang Temyong
- Johnrey Rivas as Art
- Adelle Ibarrientos as Alet
- Joshua Bulot as Estong
- Vean Olmedo as Susie
  - Marie Lupena as old Susie
- Afi Africa as Bebang
  - Domingo Almoete as old Bebang
- Dindo Arroyo as Sgt. Cabigao
- Patricia Ismael as Sr. Josie
  - Annie Pinaverde as old Sr. Josie
- Carla Lim as Lally
  - Pia Moran as old Lally
- OJ Arci as Xander
  - Krissy Poriscova as old Xander
- Chris Lim as Ben
- JP Lopez as Sgt. Alagao
- Bernard Laxa as Sgt. Manubay
- Nelson Mendoza as Ka-Manding Quimpo
- Ricky Brioso as Fr. Raffy
- Liam Tañare as Fidel

== Release ==
Katips was first screened for the press at Gateway Mall in Quezon City on November 27, 2021, before it received its second screening for the public on December 3. The film was re-released in theaters in August 3, 2022, to counter the upcoming release of the film Maid in Malacañang, which tells from the perspective of Marcos and his family, while Katips tells the story from the side of student activists during martial law.

== Accolades ==
In the 70th Filipino Academy of Movie Arts and Sciences Awards Night, held on July 30, 2022, the film won seven out of 17 categories that it was nominated in, earning the most number of awards for a film that year.

Group	Category	Name	Result
FAMAS Awards	Best Picture	Katips	Won
FAMAS Awards	Best Actress	Nicole Laurel Asensio	Nominated
FAMAS Awards	Best Actor	Jerome Ponce	Nominated
FAMAS Awards	Best Actor	Vince Tañada	Won
FAMAS Awards	Best Screenplay	Vince Tañada	Nominated
FAMAS Awards	Best Supporting Actress	Adelle Ibarrientos	Nominated
FAMAS Awards	Best Supporting Actor	Mon Confiado	Nominated
FAMAS Awards	Best Supporting Actor	Johnrey Rivas	Won
FAMAS Awards	Best Director	Vince Tañada	Won
FAMAS Awards	Best Cinematography	Manuel Abanto	Won
FAMAS Awards	Best Original Song	"Manhid" – Pipo Cifra, Vince Tañada	Nominated
FAMAS Awards	Best Original Song	"Sa Gitna ng Gulo" – Pipo Cifra, Vince Tañada	Won
FAMAS Awards	Best Musical Score	Pipo Cifra	Won
FAMAS Awards	Best Sound	Don Don Mendoza (Outpost Visual Frontier)	Nominated
FAMAS Awards	Best Visual Effects	John Joseph Tan (Outpost Visual Frontier)	Nominated
FAMAS Awards	Best Editing	Mark Jason Sucgang	Nominated
FAMAS Awards	Best Production Design	Roland Rubenecia	Nominated
