= Love ni Mister, Love ni Misis =

Philippine television talk show

- Title card
- Genre: Talk show
- Directed by: Louie Ignacio
- Presented by: Carmina Villarroel; Zoren Legaspi
- Opening theme: "Love ni Mister, Love ni Misis" by Radha Cuadrado
- Country of origin: Philippines
- Original language: Tagalog
- No. of episodes: 150

Production
- Executive producer: Wilma Galvante
- Camera setup: Multiple-camera setup
- Running time: 60 minutes
- Production company: GMA Entertainment TV

Original release
- Network: GMA Network
- Release: August 9, 2010 – March 4, 2011

Love ni Mister, Love ni Misis (transl. love of mister, love of miss) is a Philippine television lifestyle talk show broadcast by GMA Network. Directed by Louie Ignacio, it is hosted by Carmina Villarroel and Zoren Legaspi. It premiered on August 9, 2010. The show concluded on March 4, 2011, with a total of 150 episodes.

== Ratings ==
According to AGB Nielsen Philippines' Mega Manila People/Individual television ratings, the pilot episode of Love ni Mister, Love ni Misis earned a 3.9% rating. The final episode scored a 3.3% rating.

== Accolades ==
Accolades received by Love ni Mister, Love ni Misis
Year	Award	Category	Recipient	Result	Ref.
2011	25th PMPC Star Awards for Television	Best Celebrity Talk Show	Love ni Mister, Love ni Misis	Nominated	
2011	25th PMPC Star Awards for Television	Best Celebrity Talk Show Host	Carmina Villarroel Zoren Legaspi	Nominated	
