= Mavy Legaspi =

Filipino actor (born 2001)

- Born: Maverick Peter Villarroel Legaspi; January 6, 2001 (age 25); Los Angeles, California, U.S.
- Education: Reedley International School (2019)
- Occupations: Television personality; actor; host; dancer
- Years active: 2004–present
- Agent: Sparkle GMA Artist Center (2018–present)
- Parents: Zoren Legaspi (father); Carmina Villarroel (mother)
- Relatives: Cassy Legaspi (twin sister); Kier Legaspi (uncle)

Maverick Peter "Mavy" Villarroel Legaspi (Tagalog: [ˈmavi lɛˈgaspɪ]; born January 6, 2001) is an American-born Filipino actor.

== Early life and education ==
Legaspi was born on January 6, 2001 in Los Angeles, California. He is the son of actor Zoren Legaspi and actress Carmina Villarroel, and has a twin sister, Cassy Legaspi.

In 2019, Legaspi graduated from Reedley International School in Pasig.

== Career ==
In 2004, he and his twin sister, Cassy Legaspi, began appearing in commercials. In 2018, they signed a contract with the GMA Artist Center.

In 2024, he began hosting a variety show on Studio 7, and later joined All-Out Sundays. The same year, he joined the TAPE Inc. variety show Eat Bulaga!. However, in 2024, the show was renamed to Tahanang Pinakamasaya following a copyright case from TVJ. The show ended on March 2 and was replaced on GMA by a simulcast of the ABS-CBN Studios-produced program It's Showtime, which also aired on A2Z, All TV and Kapamilya Channel. Also in 2024, Legaspi and his sister joined their mother in co-hosting Sarap, 'Di Ba?.

== Personal life ==
Legaspi was previously in a relationship with actress Kyline Alcantara. On February 26, 2024, Dasuri Choi denied rumors linking her to the Legaspi and Alcantara's breakup. In August 2024, Kyline Alcantara confirmed the breakup in Fast Talk with Boy Abunda.

As of February 2025, Legaspi was in a relationship with actress Ashley Ortega.

== Filmography ==
=== Television ===
Year	Title	Role	Notes	Ref.
2010	Pepito Manaloto	Himself	Guest	
2014–2016	ASAP	Himself	Guest	
2017	Road Trip	Himself	Guest	
2018	Lip Sync Battle Philippines	Himself	Contestant	
2018	Daddy's Gurl	Paul	Guest Role	
2018–2024	Sarap, 'Di Ba?	Himself	Host	
2018–2019	Studio 7	Himself	Co-Host	
2020–2023	All-Out Sundays	Himself	Co-Host / Performer	
2021	FLEX	Himself	Host	
2021–2022	I Left My Heart in Sorsogon	Sebastian "Basti" Estrellado	Supporting Role	
2022	Abot-Kamay na Pangarap	Jordan Mendoza	Guest Role	
2022	Happy Together	Glen	Guest Role	
2022	The Boobay and Tekla Show	Himself	Guest	
2022–2023	Family Feud Philippines	Himself	Player	
2023	Zero Kilometers Away	Ardi Edwards de Leon	Main Role	
2023	Daig Kayo ng Lola Ko: Sana All (May Love Life)	Kurt	Main Role	
2023	Luv Is: Love at First Read	Kuen Lacrosse "Kudos" Pereseo	Main Role	
2023	TiktoClock	Himself	Guest / Player	
2023	Fast Talk with Boy Abunda	Himself	Guest	
2023–2024	Eat Bulaga!	Himself	Co-Host	
2024	Tahanang Pinakamasaya	Himself	Co-Host	
2024–2025	It's Showtime	Himself	Guest Hurado / Performer	
2025	Pinoy Big Brother: Celebrity Collab Edition	Himself	Host / Houseguest	
2025–2026	Hating Kapatid	Tyrone	Main Role	
2025–2026	Pinoy Big Brother: Celebrity Collab Edition 2.0	Himself	Host	
