= Johnrey Rivas =

Filipino singer and actor

- Occupations: Singer, actor and model

Johnrey Rivas, is a Filipino actor, model, singer and director.

== Career ==
=== Acting and career beginnings ===
A 12-year-old Rivas approached director Vince Tañada, after a staging of Ako si Ninoy in Tondo High School, to audition as an actor. During his initial audition with Philippine Stagers Foundation, Rivas failed to clinch a top 10 spot among 700 aspirants. He initially worked as an usher for the group to expose himself to the theater industry and officially debuted as an actor when he was 16.

Rivas was awarded Best Supporting Actor in 70th FAMAS Awards for his role in the period drama film Katips, which was based on the 2016 musical of the same name where he also previously appeared.

=== As director ===
In 2021, the short film Zomnia, directed by Rivas, was nominated in the 2021 FAMAS Awards.

== Filmography ==
=== Television ===
Year	Title	Role	Notes	Source
2020–21	Why Love Why	Benjo		
2022	Twinkle, Twinkie, Little Star	Benjo		

=== Film ===
Year	Title	Role	Notes	Source
2022	Katips	Art		

=== Theater ===
Year	Title	Role	Notes	Source
2016–17	Katips	Activist	Philippine Stagers Foundation	

== Awards and nominations ==
Year	Work	Organization	Category	Result	Source
2021	Zomnia	FAMAS Awards	Best Short Film	Nominated	
2022	Katips	FAMAS Awards	Best Supporting Actor	Won	
