= Eat Bulaga! Indonesia =

Indonesian variety and game show

- Based on: Eat Bulaga!
- Developed by: TAPE Inc. PT. SCTV (Surya Citra Media)
- Directed by: Meitya Sudaryono
- Presented by: Uya Kuya; Astrid Khairunisha; Andhika Pratama; Farid Aja; Reza Bukan; Narji; Rian Ibram; Rio Indrawan; Jenny Tan; Bianca Liza; Christie Julia; Christina Colondam; Ivan Gunawan; Gading Marten; Aaron Ashab; Selfi Nafillah; Selena Alesandra; Ramzi; Ciripa; Leo Consul; Steven Muliawan; Tora Sudiro
- Opening theme: Eat Bulaga! Theme Song (with Indonesian lyrics)
- Ending theme: Same as opening
- Country of origin: Indonesia
- Original language: Bahasa Indonesia
- No. of episodes: 369

Production
- Production locations: Studio 9, SCTV Tower, Senayan City, Jalan Asia Afrika Lot 19, Tanah Abang, Central Jakarta, Indonesia
- Camera setup: Multiple-camera setup
- Running time: 2 hours

Original release
- Network: SCTV (2012–2014)
- Release: 16 July 2012 – 3 April 2014

Related
- The New Eat Bulaga! Indonesia

Eat Bulaga! Indonesia was an Indonesian variety show produced and aired by SCTV. It served as the original Indonesian franchised of the Philippines' longest-running noon-time variety show, Eat Bulaga! which was then-produced by the Philippine television production company Television and Production Exponents, Inc. (TAPE).

The show was broadcast from 16 July 2012 until 3 April 2014.

== History ==
=== Background and negotiations ===
SCTV's Director for Programming and Production Harsiwi Achmad, had been watching episodes of Eat Bulaga! on YouTube before she moved to the network. Achmad felt that the program was entertaining and educational, and that it can spread positive values and get close with the community.

Feeling that it would work well with Indonesian audience, Achmad contacted SCTV's marketing creative service advisor, Gerry C. Guzman, who became the bridge for the Indonesian and Filipino executives to negotiate. Kebon Jeruk, director of programs and production at Studio Penta SCTV, also became interested, saying that he wants the program to be as successful as the original.

In May 2012, SCTV officials led by Guzman personally flew to the Philippines to see the show and it became the flashpoint to start the franchising negotiations.

The situation had initially shocked and surprised Filipino television executives. Malou Choa-Fagar, then-senior vice president and chief operating officer of Television and Production Exponents Inc. (TAPE), revealed that SCTV first approached them.

=== Personnel recruitement ===
Surya Utama, known by his stage name "Uya Kuya" (literally "Boss Uya", counterpart to Eat Bulaga!'s "Bossing Vic Sotto"), a magician and comedian from Bandung, became the show's main host. His wife, Astrid Khairunnisha, also known as "Astrid Kuya", was tapped for the program as well as Leo Consul, a Filipino based in Indonesia and an incumbent member of an I-pop band. On 11 July 2012, TAPE Inc. executives visited SCTV to oversee its final preparations.

=== Launch and ratings success ===
Eat Bulaga! Indonesia, was launched on 16 July 2012 – retaining much of the original segments and games played on the Philippine TV show. Five days later, Eat Bulaga! devoted part of its Saturday broadcast to celebrate its first overseas franchise through an elaborate production number and omnibus plug documenting its development.

Throughout its first year, the program kept in close touch with its original Philippine counterpart through occasional trips to the Philippines to perform with the hosts of the original show – with the first such excursion made on 18 August 2012. This was followed-up later that year when the Indonesian hosts teamed up with their Filipino counterparts to participate in a special edition of "Pinoy Henyo"

In January 2013, Leo Consul visited his homeland to perform in front of the Filipino fans, before leaving the show later in the year for undisclosed reasons. Consul's departure from the show triggered an emotional response from the other hosts where Bianca Liza, one of the co-hosts at the time, was seen in tears on-stage. Despite this, Consul's rise to being a host became a legacy and popular inspirational story in the Philippines.

The show grew popular in Indonesia, making it through one year as the leading TV show on its time slot, consistently averaging over 20%.

Eat Bulaga! Indonesia celebrated its first anniversary on 21 July 2013 at the Indoor Tennis Stadium in Jakarta. The celebration featured a guest appearance by then-minister for state-owned enterprises, Dahlan Iskan.

Iskan participated on the Indonesia Pintar segment. Various bands and pop groups also performed at the anniversary. The Philippine hosts of the original program also threw a mini-celebration of their own to congratulate the milestone of their Indonesian counterpart.

=== Cancellation and transfer ===
Unfortunately, the show's success would be short-lived as Uya Kuya left Eat Bulaga! Indonesia amid its final episodes, causing the show's ratings to drop until it was cancelled on April 3, 2014 and was replaced by FTV Sore – a movie block showcasing Indonesian box office hits.

After a seven-month hiatus, the Indonesian franchise would move to Andalas Televisi (ANTV) as The New Eat Bulaga! Indonesia that aired in two separate runs from November 2014 to August 2016 and again from 30 January to 17 February 2023

== Schedule ==
Eat Bulaga! Indonesia aired at 2:30 pm (WIB) or 3:30 pm (Philippine Standard Time), a deviation from the original which is broadcast at noon. This was done to consider the viewers' prayer time (salat) according to Islam. The first season was set for 13 weeks as a trial period and originally aired only three times a week on Mondays, Wednesdays and Fridays.

Coinciding with Filipino singer Christian Bautista making a guest appearance on December 17, 2012, Eat Bulaga! Indonesia expanded to five days a week (Monday to Friday) due to positive feedback and requests from fans.

== Cast ==
=== Presenters ===
- Uya Kuya (2012–2013)
- Astrid Khairunisha (2012–2014)
- Andhika Pratama (2013–2014)
- Farid Aja (2012–2014)
- Reza Bukan (2012–2014)
- Narji (2012–2014)
- Rian Ibram (2012–2014)
- Rio Indrawan (2012–2014)
- Jenny Tan (2012–2014)
- Bianca Liza (2012–2014)
- Christie Julia (2012–2014)
- Christina Colondam (Juara Miss Celebrity 2012) (2013–2014)
- Ivan Gunawan (2013–2014)
- Gading Marten (2014)
- Aaron Ashab (2012)
- Selfi Nafillah (2012)
- Selena Alesandra (2012–2013)
- Wijaya (2012)
- Ramzi (2012)
- Ciripa (2012)
- Leo Consul (2012-2013)
- Steven Muliawan (2012-2013)
- Tora Sudiro (2013)

=== Guest Star Presenters ===
- Mpok Nori
- Titiek Puspa
- Daus Mini
- Mpok Atik
- Saiful Jamil
- Ussy Sulistiawaty
- Melaney Ricardo
- Tyson Linch
- Cinta Kuya
