= Zoren Legaspi =

Filipino actor and television director (born 1972)

- Born: Zoren Lim Legaspi; January 30, 1972 (age 54); Manila, Philippines
- Occupations: Actor; director; host; film producer
- Years active: 1987–present
- Spouse: Carmina Villarroel (m. 2012)
- Children: Mavy Legaspi; Cassy Legaspi
- Parent: Lito Legaspi (father)

Zoren Lim Legaspi (Tagalog: [ˈsɔɾɛn lɛˈgaspɪ]; born January 30, 1972) is a Filipino actor and television director. He is best known for appearing in several television shows such as Ika-6 na Utos, Mulawin, Now and Forever: Ganti, Majika, Enchanted Garden, Glamorosa, Forevermore, Healing Hearts, Encantadia, Sirkus, Kapag Nahati ang Puso, Sahaya, Bilangin ang Bituin sa Langit and Apoy sa Langit.

He is currently an exclusive contract artist of GMA Network, as well as the network's talent management arm Sparkle GMA Artist Center alongside his twin children.

== Personal life ==
Zoren comes from a family of Filipino celebrities. His father, Lito Legaspi (1941–2019), and brothers, Kier and Brando, are all actors. His spouse, Carmina Villarroel, is a movie and television actress. They have twin children named Mavy and Cassy.

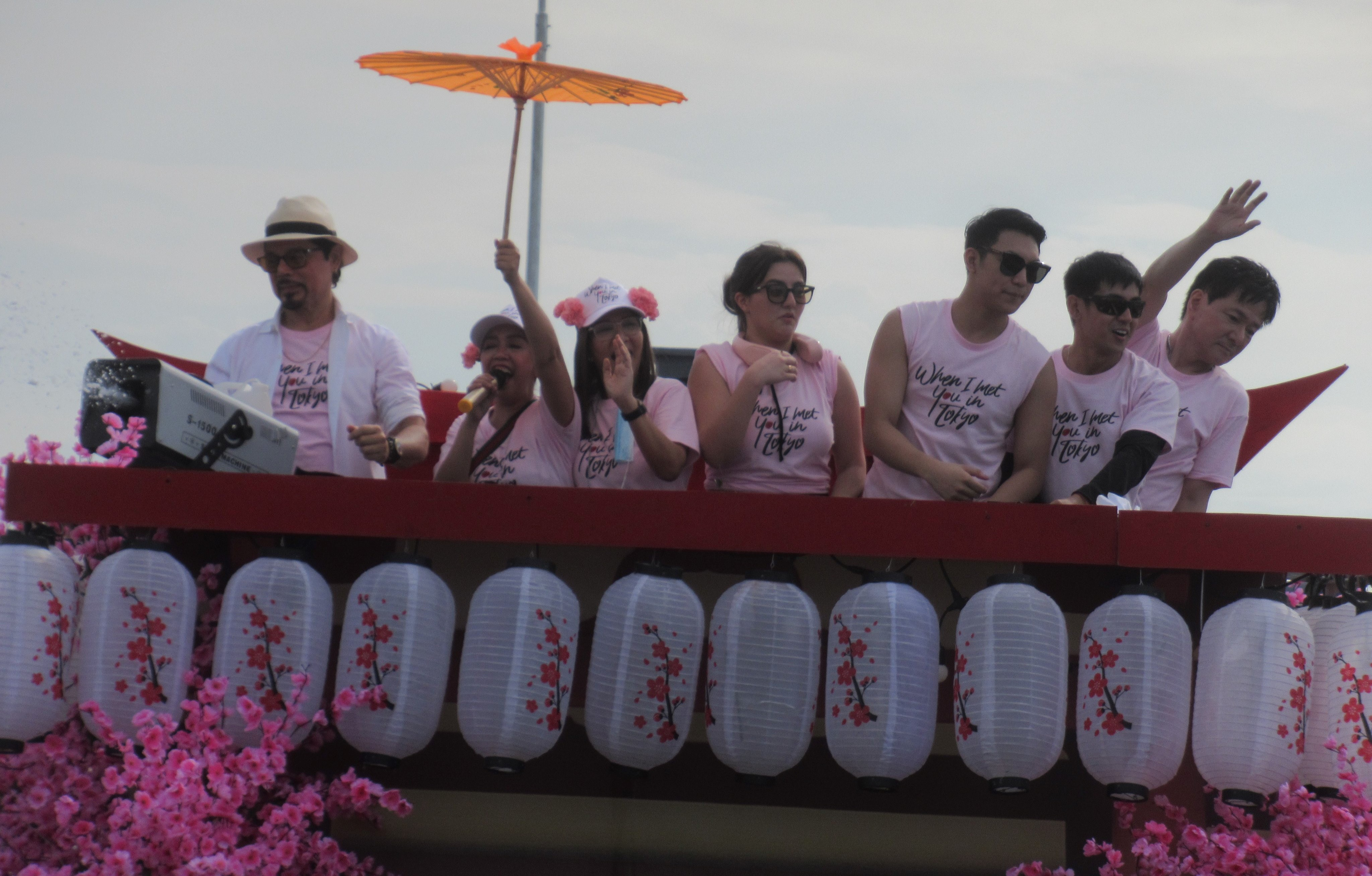
Cassy (When I Met You in Tokyo)

Legaspi is a motorcycle enthusiast.

== Career ==
He was once a leading man of beauty queen/actress Ruffa Gutierrez who was his ex-girlfriend. He was a member of That's Entertainment as a matinee idol. He was nominated for a Best Supporting Actor Award for his performance in the movie The Fatima Buen Story in the Gawad Urian Awards of 1995.

Legaspi directed for GMA Network programs like Fantastikids, Fantastic Man, Wag Kukurap and Atlantika. He made his film directorial debut for Ultraelectromagnetic Love of Regal Films which was to be shown in 2008.

He was a minor character in Agua Bendita aired on ABS-CBN.

Legaspi returned to GMA with his partner Carmina on a new talk show, Love ni Mister, Love ni Misis. This was his first hosting on TV and first talk show on GMA. The show premiered August 9, 2010.

Legaspi returned to TV5 as host in Paparazzi with his co-hosts Ruffa Gutierrez, Shalala, Cristy Fermin and Mo Twister. This was his second hosting on TV after Love Ni Mister, Love Ni Misis aired on GMA Network in 2010.

Legaspi returns again to drama via Glamorosa with grand slam best actress Lorna Tolentino and former Palmolive endorser Alice Dixson. The show premiered in November 2011.

In November 2012, Legaspi and Carmina Villaroel had their wedding, and the ABS-CBN had their special coverage of their wedding that aired November 24, 2012 entitled Zoren-Carmina: Always Forever, A Wedding Like No Other. The idea of a surprise proposal followed by a flashmob-style instant wedding was inspired by a remarkably similar episode of the U.S. television show Mobbed hosted by Howie Mandel.

In 2016, Legaspi returned to GMA Network, since his guesting on Marian Rivera's program, Yan ang Morning!, his wife Carmina Villarroel, also returned to the network in 2017.

On March 15, 2018, Legaspi signed a contract with GMA Artist Center, after he returned to the network in 2016. He returned to GMA thrice. Legaspi's first return to the network was late 2010, he moved back to GMA again for the second time in 2015 and the third time in 2016.

== Filmography ==
=== Film ===
- Wooly Booly: Ang Classmate Kong Alien (1989)
- Student Body (1990)
- Tora Tora, Bang Bang Bang (1990)
- I Have 3 Eggs (1990)
- Island of Desire (1990) as Jimmy Boy
- Pido Dida 2: Kasal Na (1991)
- Ipaglaban Mo Ako Boy Topak (1991)
- Pretty Boy Hoodlum (1991)
- Disgrasyada (1991)
- Shotgun Banjo (1992) as Banjo
- Tikboy Tikas at ang Mga Batang Krhoaks (1993)
- Bala at Lipstick (1993)
- Massacre Files (1994)
- Multo in the City (1994)
- Silya Eletrika (1994) Viva Films
- Alyas Boy Ama: Tirador (1994) - Moviestars Production
- Hataw Tatay Hataw (1994)
- The Fatima Buen Story (1995)
- Melencio Magat: Dugo Laban Dugo (1995)
- Kailanman (1996)
- Sandata (1996)
- Duwelo (1996) as Alan
- Bandido (1997)
- Baril sa Baril (1997) as Abel
- Matang Agila (1997)
- Kung Marunong Kang Magdasal, Umpisahan Mo Na (1997)
- Daniel Eskultor (1997) as Daniel
- Desperate Hours (1998)
- Kahit Mabuhay Kang Muli (1998) as Ruben
- The Resort Murders (1998)
- Alyas Big Time (1999)
- Markado (1999)
- Elias Marengo: Bayolente (1999) as Elias
- Ang Boyfriend Kong Pari (1999)
- Nag-aapoy Na Laman (2000)
- Baliktaran (2000) as Boyet Corpus
- Laban Kung Laban (2000)
- Testigo (2000) as Paolo
- Hindi Sisiw ang Kalaban Mo (2001)
- Xtreme Warriors (2001)
- The Cory Quirino Kidnap Files (2002)
- Mano Po 2: My Home (2003)
- Mulawin: The Movie (2005)
- Pacquiao: The Movie (2006)
- Inang Yaya (2006)
- Isang Araw Lang (2011)
- My Big Bossing's Adventures (2014)
- Etiquette for Mistresses (2015)
- Our Mighty Yaya (2017)
- Miss Q & A (2020)

=== Television ===
Year	Title	Role	Ref
1988–1996	That's Entertainment	Himself / Performer	
1989–1995	Eat Bulaga!	Himself / Co-host	
1989–1996	Saturday Entertainment	Himself / Performer	
1991	Maalaala Mo Kaya: Punyal		
2002	Recuerdo de Amor	Eugene Hernandez	
2002–2003	Habang Kapiling Ka	Jonas Capistrano	
2004–2005	Mulawin	Bagwis	
2005	Encantadia	Bagwis	
2005	Kakabakaba Adventures	Mezandro / Miguel	
2005	Now and Forever: Ganti	Dennis	
2006	Majika	Garam	
2007	Princess Charming	Enrico de Saavedra	
2007–2008	Kamandag	King Gulag	
2009	George and Cecil	Epoy Montalban	
2009	All My Life	Romano Estrella	
2009	Sana Ngayong Pasko	young Ernesto	
2010	Ikaw Sana	Enrico Sta. Maria	
2010	Rod Santiago's Agua Bendita		
2010	Kitchen Battles	Himself / Host	
2010–2011	Love ni Mister, Love ni Misis	Himself / Host	
2011	Machete	Malyari	
2011	Nita Negrita	Arturo	
2011	Pepito Manaloto	Jonap	
2011	Rod Santiago's The Sisters	Fidel Santiago	
2011	Maalaala Mo Kaya: Callao Cave	Jerry	
2011–2012	Paparazzi: Showbiz Exposed	Himself / Host	
2011–2012	Glamorosa	Karl Marciano	
2012–2013	Enchanted Garden	Menandro	
2014	Maalaala Mo Kaya: Skate Board	Episode role	
2014–2015	Forevermore	Alexander "Alex" Grande II	
2015	Healing Hearts	Benjie Saavendra	
2015	Magpakailanman	Episode role	
2015	Maalaala Mo Kaya	Episode role	
2015–2016	Marimar	Don Gustavo Aldama	
2016	Yan ang Morning!	Himself / Guest	
2016	Encantadia	Emre	
2016–2017	Till I Met You	Nestor Valderama	
2017	Mulawin vs. Ravena	Bagwis (Archival Footage from the movie)	
2017	I Heart Davao	Architect Eugene "Euge" Lumbas	
2017	Road Trip	Himself / Guest	
2017	Dear Uge	Episode guest	
2017	Ika-6 na Utos	Lyon Muller	
2017	Daig Kayo ng Lola Ko: Alamat ng Durian	Julian	
2018	Sirkus	Miguel	
2018	Pepito Manaloto: Ang Tunay na Kwento	Donald	
2018	Kapag Nahati ang Puso	Enrico "Nico / Nick" Del Valle	
2019	Sahaya	Harold Maglayao	
2020–2021	Sarap, 'Di Ba?	Himself / Guest / Host	
2020–2021	Bilangin ang Bituin sa Langit	Anselmo "Ansel" Santos	
2021–2022	Stories from the Heart: The End of Us	Jeffrey Guevara	
2022	Apoy sa Langit	Cesar Monastrial	
2023	Mga Lihim ni Urduja	Marius "Maestro" Tan / Marcel "Chairman" Batibuttan / Ibn Battuta	
2023–2024	Black Rider	Mayor Alfonso Buenaventura	
2025–2026	Hating Kapatid	Cris Almendras	

Credits

Television & film
Year	Title	Director	Note
2006	Fantastikids	Yes	Directorial Debut
2006–2007	Atlantika	Yes	
2007	Fantastic Man	Yes	
2010	Shake, Rattle and Roll 12	Yes	segment, Mamanyika

== Accolades ==
=== Awards and nominations ===
- Gawad Urian - Best Supporting Actor for The Fatima Buen Story (nominated)
