= The New Eat Bulaga! Indonesia =

- Based on: Eat Bulaga!
- Developed by: TAPE Inc. (2014–2016, 2023); PT Cakrawala Andalas Televisi (Visi Media Asia)
- Presented by: 2014–16: Uya Kuya; Astrid Khairunisha; Shaheer Sheikh; Saurav Gurjar; Reza Bukan; Farid Aja; Tengku Dewi Putri; Lavanya Bhardwaj; Ibnu Jamil; Brandon Nicholas; Vin Rana; Fiona Fachru Nisa; Nita Sofiani; Ana Riana; Vicky Prasetyo; 2023 revival: Okky Lukman; Leo Consul; Rullyabii Margana; Alifa Lubis; Devina Kirana; Ncess Nabati; Aldi Taher; Jasi Michelle
- Opening theme: Eat Bulaga! Theme (2022 version; with Indonesian lyrics)
- Ending theme: Same as opening
- Country of origin: Indonesia
- Original language: Bahasa Indonesia
- No. of seasons: 2

Production
- Production locations: Studio 9, ANTV Epicentrum Studio, South Jakarta
- Camera setup: Multiple-camera setup
- Running time: 120 minutes

Original release
- Network: antv
- Release: 17 November 2014 – 8 August 2016
- Release: 30 January 2023 – February 17, 2023

Related
- Eat Bulaga! Indonesia; Eat Bulaga!

The New Eat Bulaga! Indonesia is a variety and game show in Indonesia that was aired by antv. It was based on the Philippines' longest-running noon-time variety show, Eat Bulaga! which was then-produced under Television and Production Exponents, Inc., Overall, the program was a successor to its first incarnation that aired from 16 July 2012 until 3 April 2014 on competing SCTV.

The New Eat Bulaga! Indonesia ran from 17 November 2014, to 8 August 2016, and from 30 January 2023, to 17 February 2023, with a mix of original and new hosts.

== Series overview ==
Season	No. of episodes	Originally broadcast	
Season	No. of episodes	Series premiere	Series finale
1	369	16 July 2012	3 April 2014
2	455	17 November 2014	8 August 2016
3	15	30 January 2023	17 February 2023

== History ==
=== Prior incarnation ===
Eat Bulaga! was originally franchised by Surya Citra Televisi as Eat Bulaga! Indonesia, retaining much of the original segments and games played on the Philippine TV show. It premiered on SCTV on July 16, 2012 after three months of negotiations and preparations. Bandung-born magician and comedian Uya Kuya was the main host and had Filipino teacher-turned-celebrity Leo Consul as one of its co-hosts. Eat Bulaga! Indonesia constantly ranked #1 on its timeslot, according to national TV ratings.

Throughout its first year, the show kept in close touch with its original Philippine counterpart. The hosts made many occasional trips to the Philippines to perform with the hosts of the original show – with the first such excursion broadcast on 18 August 2012

However, the show was cancelled by SCTV on 3 April 2014, weeks after Uya Kuya departed from the programme.

=== Transfer to ANTV ===
The Indonesian franchise returned as The New Eat Bulaga! Indonesia on antv, airing its pilot telecast on November 17, 2014.

While Uya Kuya, Astrid Khairunnisha, Farid Aja and Reza Bukan retained their roles as main hosts, the show debuted with a completely new set of co-hosts — the majority being Indian actors with shows aired by ANTV — as well as a new layout. Because ANTV's audience included both Indians and Indian Indonesians, this version of the show adopted much Indian as well as Indo-Islamic influence and became more drastically differentiated from the original Filipino program.

Its opening theme song and performance was re-written with new lyrics, though its tune was still based from the original Philippine composition. Viewers were greeted with "Inilah, The New Eat Bulaga! Indonesia", meaning: "This is The New Eat Bulaga! Indonesia," in English. In February 2016, the theme was once again given a minor change, a faster and modern dance-like mix.

Many of the games also debuted with new names, due to many of their original Philippine counterparts being discontinued. In spite of such handicap, the program also launched original segments, hence the adding of "The New" to the show's name to emphasize the large changes.

Viewers also got to watch replays of entire episodes on ANTV's YouTube channel, which also had replays of its other television shows. A unique twist to this version was its celebration of Islamic holidays and feasts, airing "Ramadan"-tailored editions during the Islamic holy month of the same name.

On 20 November 2015, The New Eat Bulaga! Indonesia celebrated its first anniversary with ANTV – featuring an Indian-influenced celebration and guest appearances by Indian actresses Paridhi Sharma and Lavina Tandon due to both celebrities having a large fan base in Indonesia.

The show had its last live episode with ANTV on 30 June 2016, followed by an encore episode airing on 8 August 2016.

=== 2023: Short-lived revival ===
On 30 January 2023, The New Eat Bulaga! Indonesia returned for a second time on ANTV, with Okky Lukman, Leo Consul (from the 2012 SCTV version), Rullyabii Margana, Alifa Lubis, Devina Kirana, Ncess Nabati, Aldi Taher and Jasi Michelle as the new set of hosts. Predating its mother version by four weeks, The New Eat Bulaga! Indonesia was the first in the franchise's history to make its 16:9 widescreen debut.

However, the show was cancelled yet again, on 17 February 2023, after only 18 days of airtime.

== Scheduling ==
Similar to its prior incarnation, The New Eat Bulaga! Indonesia did not air on the network's noontime slot which was the case of the original Filipino program as a consideration to the viewers' prayer time (salat).

Its 2014–16 run aired from 8:00 am (WIB) onwards, Monday to Saturday while its short-lived 2023 revival was slated at the earlier breakfast hours of 7:00 am to 9:00 am (WIB – corresponding to 8:00 to 10:00 AM PHT), Monday to Friday. Both runs were a deviation from the 15:30 WIB (14:30 during Ramadan) slot held under SCTV

== Hosts ==
=== 2014–16 ===
- Uya Kuya (2014–2016)
- Astrid Khairunnisha (2014–2016)
- Shaheer Sheikh (2014–2016)
- Saurav Gurjar (2014–2016)
- Reza Bukan (2014–2016)
- Farid Aja (2014–2016)
- Tengku Dewi Putri (2014–2016)
- Lavanya Bharadwaj (2014–2016)
- Ibnu Jamil (2014–2016)
- Brandon Nicholas (2014–2016)
- Vin Rana (2014–2016)
- Rohit Bharadwaj (2014–2016)
- Fiona Fachru Nisa (2014–2016)
- Nita Sofiani (2014–2016)
- Ana Riana (2014–2016)
- Vicky Prasetyo (2015–2016)

=== 2023 revival ===
- Okky Lukman (2023)
- Leo Consul (2023)
- Rullyabii Margana (2023)
- Alifa Lubis (2023)
- Devina Kirana (2023)
- Ncess Nabati (2023)
- Aldi Taher (2023)
- Jasi Michelle (2023)

== Segments ==
These were the segments on the show, as they were on ANTV's The New Eat Bulaga! Indonesia, shown with their original names on SCTV's Eat Bulaga! Indonesia, the show adapted some games and segments from the original program:

=== Studio Segments ===
- Tokcer Otak Encer (originally "Tokcer", "Indonesia Pintar", from Pinoy Henyo)
- Cari Tahu Biar Tahu (from Bawal Judgmental)
- Zona Rejeki (from Lucky Juan)
- Cocok Gak Cocok (from Heart to Get)

=== Remote Segments ===
- Kampung Superstar (from Barangay Superstar)
- Tanjidor Tantangan Rejeki Outdoor (originally "Berbagi Kejuta", "Satu Untuk Semua, Semua Untuk Satu", from Juan for All, All for Juan: Bayanihan of d' Pipol)
  - Olympic Bulaga (similar from "Bulagaan Olympics 2020" and "KaPalaro: Palarong Pang Barangay")
  - Tangkap Rejeki (based on "Lucky Truck")
  - Zumba Bulaga (based on "Zoombarangay: Zoombabait Ninyo, Thank You!")

== Discontinued/seasonal segments ==
- Idola Kampung (originally "Jagoan Karaoke", from Pambato ng Videoke)
- Jackpot Dadakan (Jedak) (from On the Spot, Jackpot!)
- Little Miss Indonesia (from Little Miss Philippines)
- Little Mister Indonesia (from That's My Boy)
- Maju Terus Pantang Mundur (from Laban o Bawi)
- DanceBulaga
- Ekstrim Karaoke
- Masak Gokil
- Super Grandma Indonesia
- That's My Boy Indonesia (from That's My Boy Philippines)
- Olympiade Bayi (from Babylympics)
- The Tailor
- Pekerja Keras
- Barberman
- Turisnesia (from You're My Foreignoy/You're My Foreignay)
- Merah, Putih (from Kontrapelo: Sa Pula, Sa Puti)
- Kanan Kiri Bumbum Cring! (from Kaliwa o Kanan? Wave, Wave, Wave, Win! Win! Win!)
- Beandaan (from Bulagaan University)
- Bolagaan (from Bolagaan)
