= Nicole Asensio =

Filipino singer-songwriter

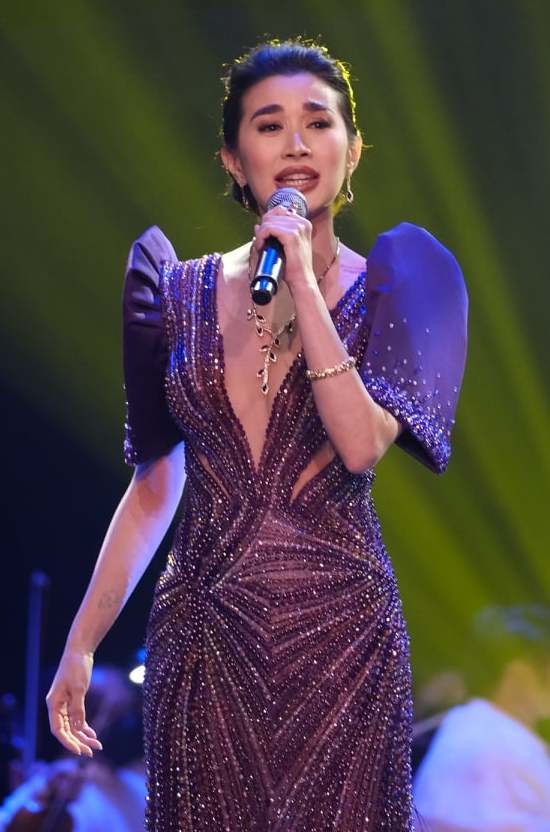
- Asensio in December 2021 performing at the 90th anniversary of the Manila Metropolitan Theater

Background information
- Born: Isobelle Nicole Laurel Asensio
- Genres: Symphonic rock, progressive rock, classical
- Occupations: Singer, songwriter, producer, model
- Instrument: Vocals
- Formerly of: General Luna

Isobelle Nicole Laurel Asensio is a Filipino actress, singer and songwriter. After providing lead vocals for all-girl rock band General Luna, she began a solo career and released her first album Schizoprano in 2015.

== Early life and family ==
A member of the Laurel family, Asensio is the daughter of singer Marissa "Iwi" Laurel. Her maternal grandparents are former Vice President of the Philippines Salvador Laurel (the son of Philippine President Jose P. Laurel), and the singer Celia Diaz-Laurel. She is the first cousin of actress Denise Laurel and niece of theater artist Cocoy Laurel. Her paternal grandmother is famed opera singer Fides Cuyugan-Asensio.

Asensio began singing as a child, but "didn't undergo formal voice lessons like most heirs [of] musical legends do. Instead, living with her grandmother, mother, and uncle, was enough for her to discover her musicality."

She graduated from De La Salle University in 2007 with a bachelor's degree in literature.

== Musical career ==
Asensio got her professional start in musical theatre. At the age of five, while with Repertory Philippines, she got the chance to sing for French record producer, actor, singer, songwriter and musical theatre composer Claude-Michel Schönberg, best known for creating Les Misérables and Miss Saigon, and was offered the role of Cosette in the 1990 production. "I wasn't ready to leave the country or adjust schooling at age five," she said in an interview with MEGA Magazine. In 1998, at age twelve, Asensio performed as one of the orphans in her first major production Annie with Repertory Philippines. The following year she performed in another musical (The Magic Staff) with her grandmother.

By age 15, she had recorded radio ads and jingles for various brands. She grew up listening to different genres but her main influences are the British bands Pink Floyd and Skunk Anansie. She has performed in theater productions with Repertory Philippines, Okasaki Theaterworks, Everyman Presents, and 9Works Theatrical.

Her first musical foray outside theatre was as a founding member of the band Crowjane.

In 2010, she played Mimi Marquez in a Philippine production of RENT. That same year, all-girl rock band General Luna formed, with Asensio fronting on lead vocals. General Luna went on permanent hiatus in the last quarter of 2013.

=== Schizoprano ===
In 2015, under MCA Music, Asensio released her debut solo album Schizoprano, a portmanteau of the words schizophrenic and soprano." The album merged Asensio's background in theater and classical music with her more recent forays in rock music. Tracks from the album include single "Leader for a Day", with lyrics taken from replies to a Facebook status update she posted asking people what they would do if they were leader for a day. Other tracks are collaborations such as the WilabaliW's Ian Tayao on the love song "All in All"; rapper Mike Swift on "Wag (Mo Na Ako Mahalin)"; and her Philpop entry song "A Song on a Broken String". The piano arrangement of another track, "Walang Anuman", was created by Italian composer and friend Diedonne Russo, who gave her a piano riff with a note: “This is my gift to you. Write something in your language.” Asensio teamed up with JC Magsalin of the Manila Philharmonic Orchestra to create an orchestral arrangement for the song and e-mailed it to Russo, with a note stating “This is my gift back to you.”

== Filmography ==
=== Film ===
Year	Title	Role	Notes	Ref.
2021	Katips	Lara Quimpo		

=== Television series ===
Year	Title	Role	Network	Notes	Ref.
2022	Mano Po Legacy: The Flower Sisters	Celeste Villagarcia	GMA Network	Guest role	
