= Eat Bulaga! =

Philippine television variety show

- Title card since 2024
- Also known as: Eat... Bulaga! (Note: 1979–2004; stylized in all caps since 2024); EB (Note: Abbreviation); E.A.T. (Note: 2023–24)
- Genre: Variety show
- Written by: Tyrene Delgado; Callie Agustin; Michelle Camara; Jeyna Azugui
- Directed by: Poochie Rivera; Pat Plaza; Bert de Leon; Norman Ilacad; Moty Apostol; Ice Seguerra
- Creative directors: Jeny Ferre; Renato Aure Jr.
- Presented by: Tito Sotto; Vic Sotto; Joey de Leon; Jose Manalo; Allan K; Wally Bayola; Paolo Ballesteros; Pauleen Luna; Ryan Agoncillo; Ryzza Mae Dizon; Alden Richards; Maine Mendoza; Miles Ocampo; Carren Eistrup; Atasha Muhlach; R'Bonney Gabriel; Ian Red; Julia Barretto; Hyeonyul Kim
- Narrated by: "Long Tall" Howard Medina; Peter Musñgi; Tom Alvarez; Show Suzuki; Mitch "Super Mitch" Amurao
- Theme music composer: Vic Sotto; Vincent Dy Buncio; Pancho Oppus
- Opening theme: "Eat Bulaga!"; "It Bulaga"; "Tahanang Pinakamasaya, Eat Bulaga!"
- Country of origin: Philippines
- Original language: Tagalog

Production
- Executive producers: Liza Marcelo-Lazatin; Rod dela Cruz
- Producers: Antonio P. Tuviera; Romeo Jalosjos Jr.; Tito Sotto; Vic Sotto; Joey de Leon
- Production locations: RPN Live Studio 1, Broadcast City, Old Balara, Quezon City, Metro Manila, Philippines (1979–87); Celebrity Sports Plaza, Old Balara, Quezon City, Metro Manila, Philippines (1987–89, 1994–95); ABS-CBN Studio 1, ABS-CBN Broadcasting Center, Diliman, Quezon City, Metro Manila, Philippines (1989–94); Broadway Centrum, New Manila, Quezon City, Metro Manila, Philippines (1995–2018); APT Studios, Cainta, Rizal, Philippines (2018–24); Studio 4, TV5 Media Center, Mandaluyong, Metro Manila, Philippines (since 2024)
- Camera setup: Multiple-camera setup
- Running time: 150–180 minutes
- Production companies: Production Specialists, Inc. (1979–80); TAPE Inc. (1981–2024); TVJ Productions (since 2024)

Original release
- Network: Radio Philippines Network (1979–89); ABS-CBN (1989–95); GMA Network (1995–2024); TV5 (since 2024)
- Release: July 30, 1979 – present

Related
- Eat Bulaga! Indonesia; The New Eat Bulaga! Indonesia; Eat Bulaga! Myanmar

Eat Bulaga! (transl. eat surprise!; stylized as Eat... Bulaga!) is a Philippine television variety show broadcast by Radio Philippines Network, ABS-CBN, GMA Network and TV5. Originally hosted by Tito Sotto, Vic Sotto, Joey de Leon, Chiqui Hollmann and Richie D'Horsie, it premiered on Radio Philippines Network on July 30, 1979, on the network's afternoon line up. The show moved to ABS-CBN on February 18, 1989, and later on GMA Network on January 28, 1995. By 2024, TV5 airs the show. It is the longest-running variety show in the Philippines. The show is currently produced by TVJ Productions, Inc. and hosted by Tito Sotto, Vic Sotto, Joey de Leon, Jose Manalo, Allan K., Wally Bayola, Paolo Ballesteros, Pauleen Luna, Ryan Agoncillo, Ryzza Mae Dizon, Maine Mendoza, Miles Ocampo, Carren Eistrup, Atasha Muhlach, R'Bonney Gabriel, Hyeonyul Kim, Ian Red and Julia Barretto.

== History ==
=== Radio Philippines Network (1979–89) ===
The show's original hosts

Production Specialists, Inc., a company owned by Romeo Jalosjos Sr., came up with the idea of creating a noontime show for Radio Philippines Network. Antonio Tuviera argued that Tito Sotto, Vic Sotto and Joey de Leon, collectively known as TVJ, would be the "perfect" hosts for the show. At a meeting at the InterContinental Manila, Tuviera made an offer to them which was accepted. De Leon coined the term "Eat Bulaga" as the title of the show and owns its copyright.

Eat Bulaga! premiered on July 30, 1979, with its pilot episode filmed at the RPN Live Studio 1 in Broadcast City, Quezon City. Chiqui Hollmann and Richie D'Horsie also served as the original hosts. The theme song was composed by Vic Sotto, with Vincent Dy Buncio and Pancho Oppus and musically arranged by Homer Flores. During the show's first few months, it was on the brink of cancellation due to "stiff" competition and lack of advertisers, despite having their advertising rates reduced to ₱750 (equivalent to ₱25,497 in 2021) and the hosts' lack of salary for over a year.

De Leon said that he and the Sotto brothers did not sign a contract with the show when they were offered the opportunity to become hosts. Vic Sotto said that he accepted the offer and would stop once he had money to buy a personal vehicle. De Leon also said that the show was supposed to be a short-term job. After two years, the trio decided to stay with the show. The show gained top-rating status in 1980 with the segment "Mr. Macho". Production Specialists Inc. went bankrupt and dissolved sometime in July 1980 and the production of the show was handed over to Television and Production Exponents, Inc. on July 7, 1981. In 1982, Coney Reyes joined the show as the newest host.

In the aftermath of the People Power Revolution, the show went off the air from February 27 to March 1, 1986, due to the transmitter of RPN being disabled by reformist soldiers. In 1987, Aiza Seguerra joined the show after Little Miss Philippines. Eat Bulaga! left the Broadcast City complex on December 2, 1987 and transferred to Celebrity Sports Plaza in Quezon City the next day, owing to RPN being beset by periodic change of management. The compounded situation led to Tony Tuviera's decision to start negotiations with ABS-CBN to eventually transfer the show.

=== ABS-CBN (1989–95) ===
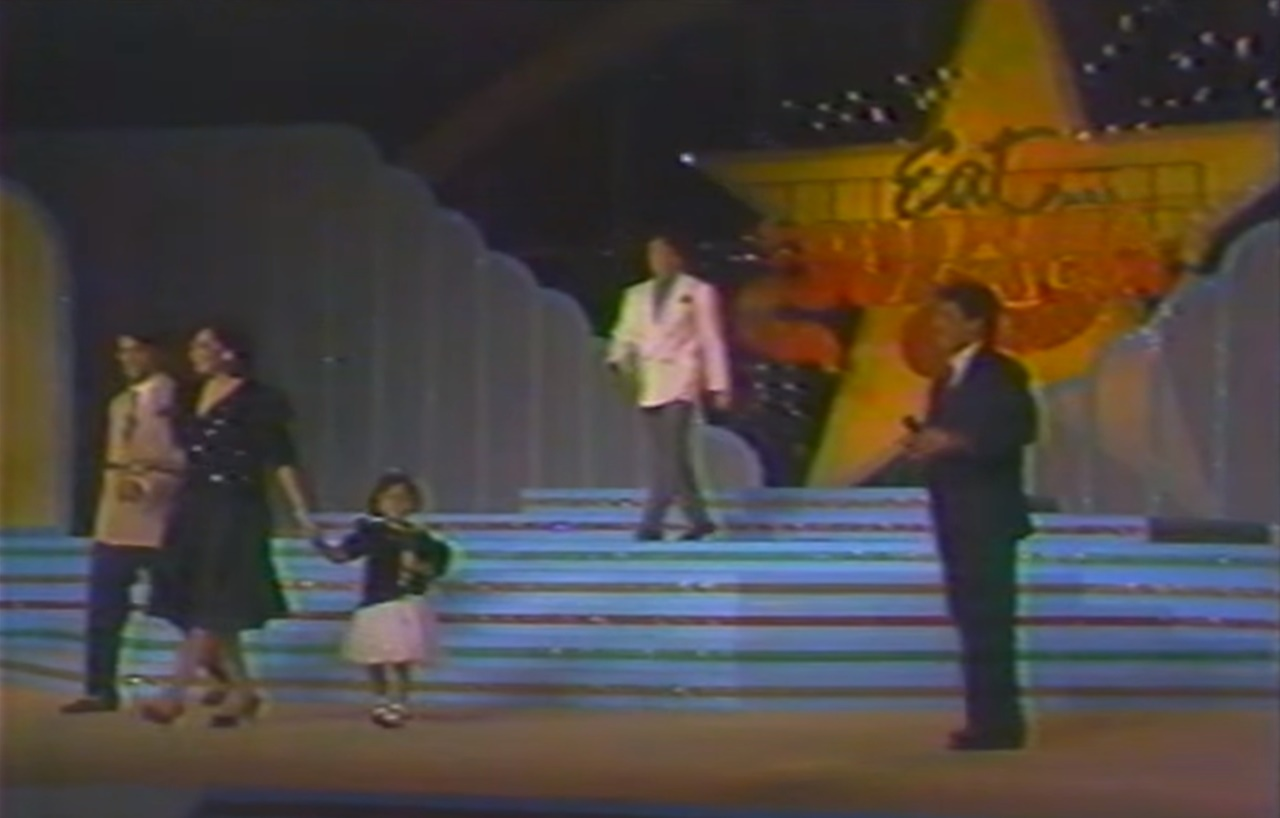
Eat... Bulaga!: Moving On at Araneta Coliseum in 1989

Eat... Bulaga! moved to ABS-CBN under a co-production agreement due to problems brought about by the sequestration of RPN. On February 18, 1989, the show premiered on its new home with a TV special titled Eat... Bulaga!: Moving On, staged at the Araneta Coliseum. The show's tenth anniversary celebration was held on September 23, 1989, at the Araneta Coliseum.

In 1994, ABS-CBN attempted to purchase the broadcast rights to the show from TAPE Inc. The offer was rejected by Antonio Tuviera and Malou Choa-Fagar, leading the network to give Eat... Bulaga! an ultimatum to leave by January 1995.

=== GMA Network (1995–2024) ===
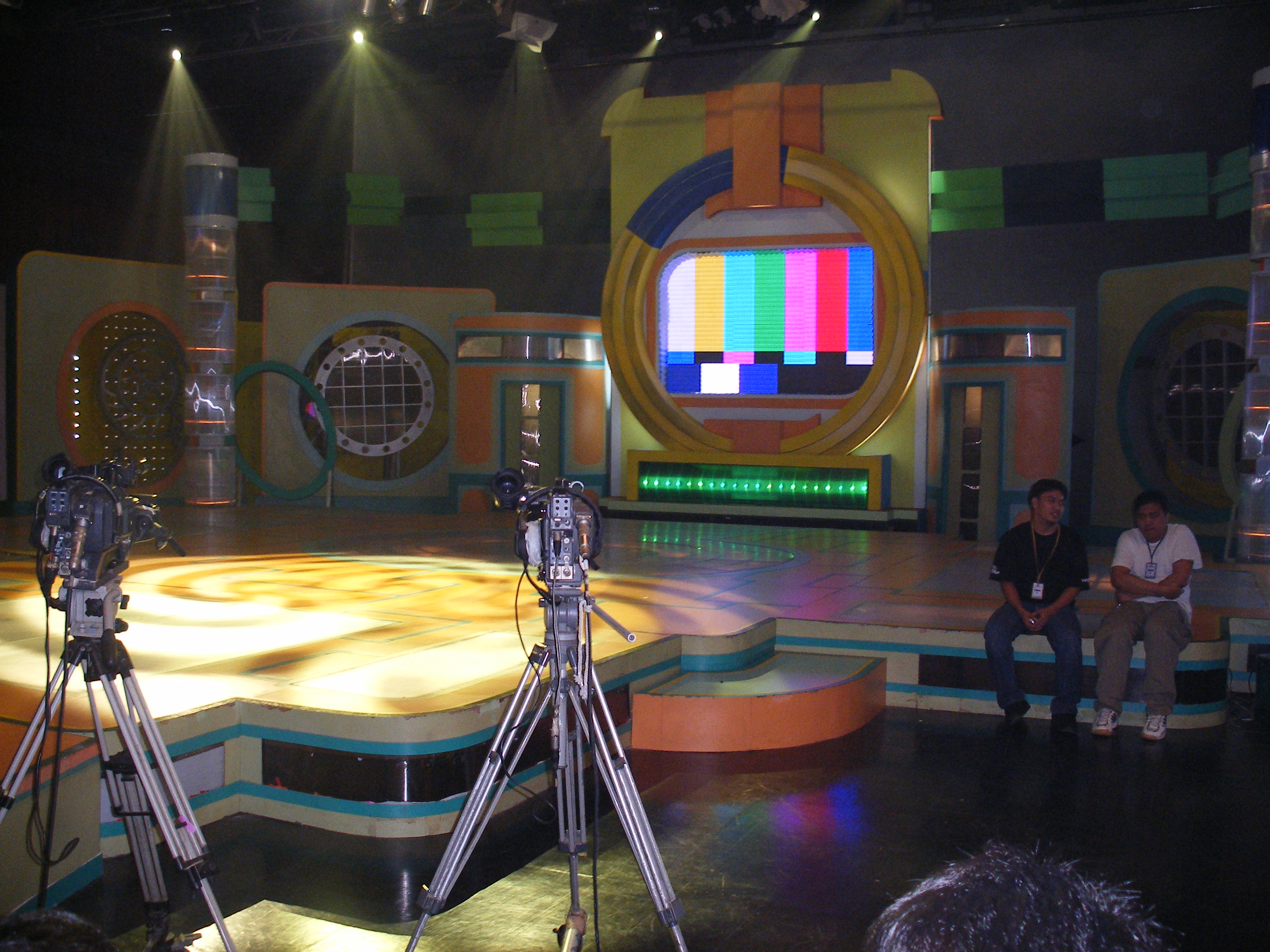
The set of Eat Bulaga! at Broadway Centrum in 2007

Eat Bulaga! began its transition from ABS-CBN Studio 1 to the Celebrity Sports Plaza on October 1, 1994, as part of its preparation for the switch to a new network. The move was finalized on January 19, 1995, during a contract signing between TAPE Inc. and GMA Network executives at the Makati Shangri-La, Manila. Subsequently, the show premiered on GMA Network on January 28, 1995, with a special episode titled Eat... Bulaga!: The Moving!.

Toni Rose Gayda, Allan K., Samantha Lopez, and Francis Magalona joined Eat Bulaga! as co-hosts, expanding the show's roster. Gayda and Allan K. officially became co-hosts on January 7, 1995, while Lopez and Magalona joined on January 14, 1995. Anjo Yllana became a host on November 28, 1998, further solidifying the program's appeal. By the year 2000, Eat Bulaga! had made history as the first noontime variety show in the Philippines to award millions of pesos in prizes through its popular segment Laban o Bawi, which quickly became a favorite among viewers. Wally Bayola joined the show on April 1, 2000, initially serving as an off-screen jester. His role was to entertain the studio audience during commercial breaks and announce introductions for the show's segments.

Eat Bulaga! celebrated its 25th anniversary with a special episode aired from Expo Pilipino on November 19, 2004. This celebration, titled Eat Bulaga! Silver Special, was broadcast on November 27 and 29, 2004. The show received the Best Entertainment (One-Off/Annual) Special award at the Asian Television Awards in Singapore on December 1, 2005. SexBomb Girls left the show due to a dispute with the producers and were replaced by the EB Babes on January 7, 2006. They returned to the show on March 3, 2007, and departed again on January 29, 2011. EB Babes continued as regular performers until February 23, 2019, when they left due to contract expiration and other business decisions. In September 2007, de Leon began an on-screen feud with Willie Revillame, leading to the Hello Pappy scandal, which became a significant controversy over allegations of the segment possibly being rigged by the producers.

On March 6, 2009, Vic Sotto announced the death of Francis Magalona, who succumbed to leukemia. A tribute episode for Magalona, who also coined the term "Dabarkads", was aired the following day. The show aired a 30th anniversary special, titled Tatlong Dekads ng Dabarkads, on October 17, 2009. Ryan Agoncillo joined the show on October 24, 2009. Ryzza Mae Dizon joined the show on July 9, 2012, after winning the talent search Little Miss Philippines on June 21, 2012. The Lenten drama specials returned on April 14, 2014, after a seven-year hiatus. The last Lenten drama special before the hiatus aired on April 6, 2007.

The love team AlDub, consisting of Alden Richards and Maine Mendoza

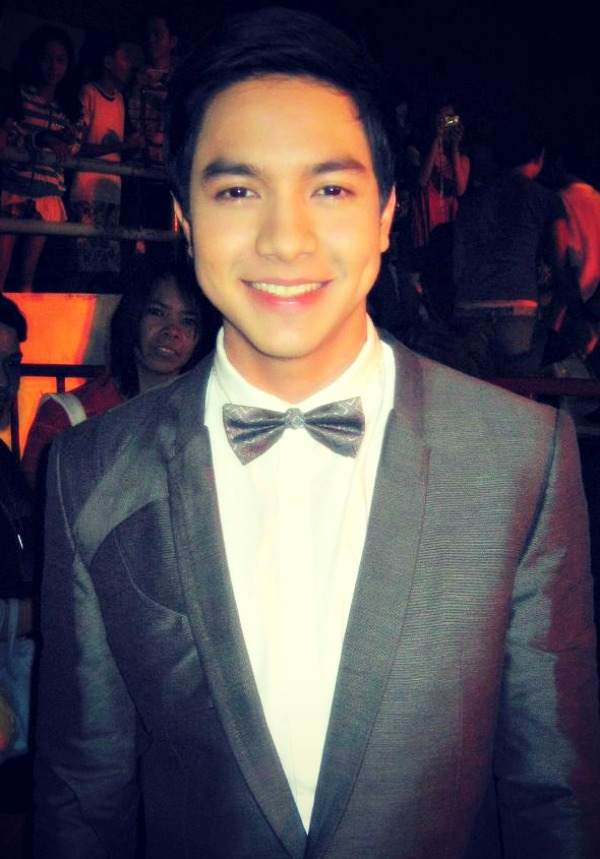
Alden Richards

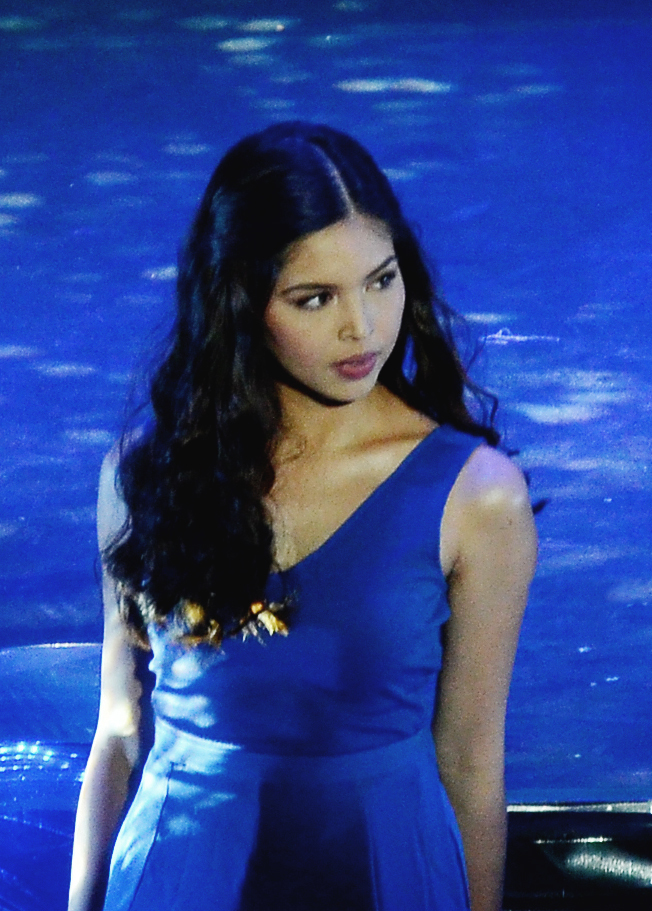
Maine Mendoza

Alden Richards began his involvement with Eat Bulaga! on April 18, 2015, as a co-host for various segments, while Maine Mendoza first appeared on July 4, 2015, as Yaya Dub, a character introduced in the Problem Solving sub-segment of the Juan for All, All for Juan segment. In this role, Mendoza portrayed a comedic character interacting with the show's hosts and participants, which included solving fictional problems or misunderstandings in a humorous way. Her character quickly gained popularity due to her engaging Dubsmash videos and natural comedic timing.

The AlDub love team officially began on July 16, 2015, during a split-screen interaction in the Juan for All, All for Juan segment, which led to the creation of the popular Kalyeserye series. This event achieved 41 million tweets, becoming the most used hashtag within 24 hours on Twitter. The show's ratings surged, reaching a peak of 39.1% in Mega Manila and 33.6% nationwide from August to September 2015. It became a daily trending topic on Twitter worldwide, with the hashtag #AlDubEBTamangPanahon trending notably on October 24, 2015, when the show held a benefit concert titled Tamang Panahon at the Philippine Arena. Kalyeserye concluded on December 17, 2016, after a total of 400 episodes.

On December 8, 2018, the show moved its live studio location to APT Studios in Cainta, Rizal. In March 2020, the admission of a live audience in the studio and production were suspended due to the enhanced community quarantine in Luzon caused by the COVID-19 pandemic. The show resumed its programming on June 8, 2020. Anjo Yllana was laid off from the show on August 22, 2021. Ruby Rodriguez followed, leaving the show on May 15, 2021. Maja Salvador joined the show on October 2, 2021, with the segment, DC 2021: Maja on Stage, followed by Miles Ocampo on March 5, 2022. In February 2023, Carren Eistrup joined the show after winning the reality competition segment Bida Next. In April 2023, Salvador left the show, citing her upcoming wedding and "uncertain circumstances with the show".

=== TAPE Inc.'s Eat Bulaga! and E.A.T. (2023–24) ===
Tuviera resigned as chief executive officer of TAPE Inc. on March 6, 2023. He was succeeded by Romeo Jalosjos Jr., who officially took over the role on March 7, 2023. Following this transition, Soraya Jalosjos was appointed Vice President of Administration, and Bullet Jalosjos became the company's Chief Financial Officer (CFO). Under Jalosjos' leadership, the company sought to rebrand Eat Bulaga!, resulting in the replacement of longtime mainstay hosts and top-rated segments, and a salary reduction for the entire production team.

TAPE Inc. suspended production of Eat Bulaga! from May 31 to June 3, 2023, following the announcement of original hosts Tito Sotto, Vic Sotto, and Joey de Leon that they were severing ties with the company under Jalosjos. Fellow hosts of the show—Paolo Ballesteros, Carren Eistrup, Jose Manalo, Maine Mendoza, Ryzza Mae Dizon, Wally Bayola, Ryan Agoncillo and Allan K. — and production members also filed their resignations in the days after their announcement.

TAPE Inc., under the Jalosjos management, continued to use Eat Bulaga! as the title of their noontime show on GMA Network from June 5, 2023, to January 5, 2024, with new hosts and segments, pending the decision of the IPOPHL regarding the petition from the Sotto brothers and De Leon to cancel TAPE's "Eat Bulaga" trademark. During this period, the show was hosted by Alexa Miro, Arra San Agustin, Alyona Baquial, Betong Sumaya, Buboy Villar, Cassy Legaspi, Chariz Solomon, Dasuri Choi, Glaiza de Castro, Isko Moreno, Kimpoy Feliciano, Kokoy de Santos, Mavy Legaspi, Michael Sager, Paolo Contis, Winwyn Marquez, and Yasser Marta, with the participation of the Music Hero Band and the BPop Idols.

On June 7, 2023, Eat Bulaga! hosts – Tito Sotto, Vic Sotto, Joey de Leon, Allan K., Jose Manalo, Wally Bayola, Paolo Ballesteros, Ryan Agoncillo, Maine Mendoza, Ryzza Mae Dizon and Carren Eistrup announced their transfer to TV5 through the newly-formed TVJ Productions, a joint venture with TV5's parent MediaQuest Holdings, announcing a new noontime show that would replace It's Showtime in its timeslot. On July 1, 2023, the noontime show, EAT..., premiered on TV5. Miles Ocampo returned as Dabarkads on July 8, 2023, after leaving due to health issues, while Atasha Muhlach made her debut on September 23, 2023, as a new addition to the cast. In October 2023, the show introduced the Singing Queens, featuring members Anne Ferrer, Eunice Janine, Samantha Rascal, Khayzy Bueno, and Jean Drilon.

On July 29, 2023, both E.A.T. and Eat Bulaga! celebrated the show's 44th anniversary with their respective tribute episodes. E.A.T. aired 143–44: National Dabarkads Day, reflecting the past 44 years of the original Eat Bulaga!; while Eat Bulaga! launched their new theme song, "Tahanang Pinakamasaya, Eat Bulaga!".

On December 4, 2023, the Intellectual Property Office of the Philippines cancelled TAPE Inc.'s registration of the "Eat Bulaga" and "EB" trademarks No. 4-2011-005951 and No. 4–2011–005950, respectively, and credited Tito Sotto, Vic Sotto and de Leon as the owner of Eat Bulaga!. The decisions were received by the parties the next day. On January 5, 2024, the Marikina Regional Trial Court found Television and Production Exponents, Inc. liable for "unfair competition and copyright infringement" and issued an order "permanently enjoining" it and GMA Network from using the trademarks "Eat Bulaga" and "EB" including its logos and jingle in their shows. The court barred them from airing any Eat Bulaga footage recorded prior to May 31, 2023, and directed the Intellectual Property Office of the Philippines to cancel TAPE's registration of "Eat Bulaga", "EB", and their logos. Moreover, it ordered TAPE Inc. to pay hosts and their co-defendant Jeny Ferre ₱2 million in temperate damages, as well as ₱500,000 in exemplary damages and ₱500,000 in attorney's fees.

On January 6, 2024, TAPE Inc. halted the production of Eat Bulaga!, and relaunched their show as Tahanang Pinakamasaya. Due to low viewership and increasing debt, Tahanang Pinakamasaya was cancelled on March 2, 2024.

=== TV5 (since 2024) ===
On January 6, 2024, E.A.T. was rebranded as Eat Bulaga!. The show began to simulcast its Saturday episodes on CNN Philippines as part of an agreement with Nine Media Corporation. Following the shutdown of CNN Philippines on January 31, 2024, the simulcast was carried over and extended to weekdays, by its replacement channel, RPTV starting on February 1, 2024.

== Hosts ==
Hosts

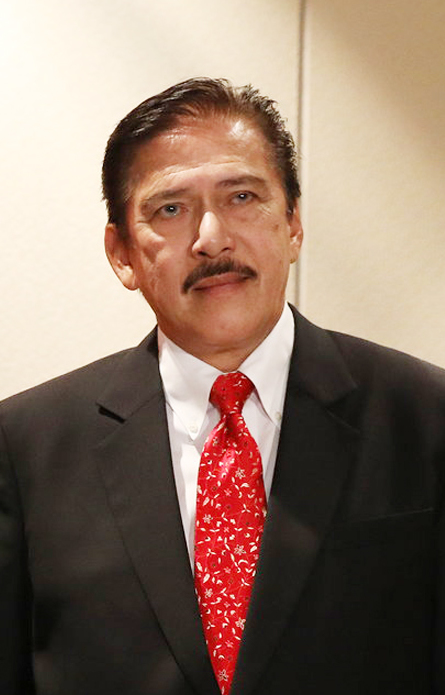
Tito Sotto

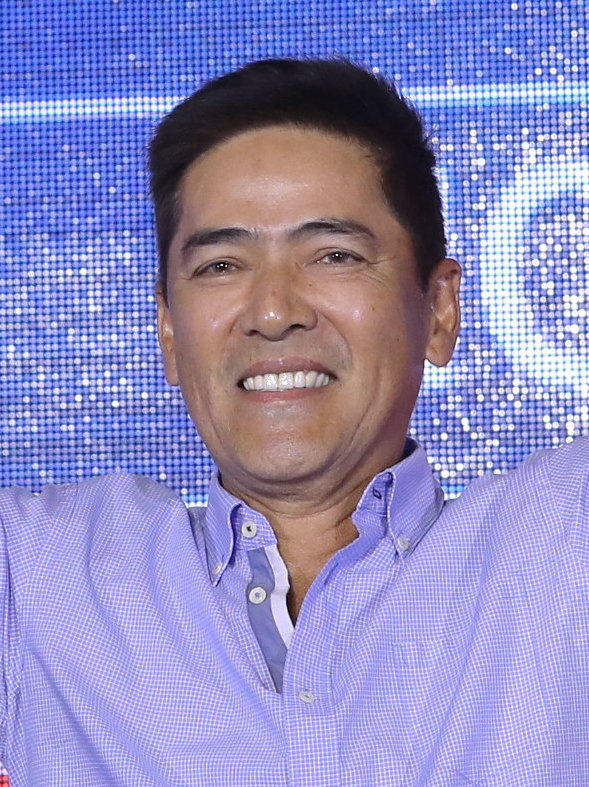
Vic Sotto

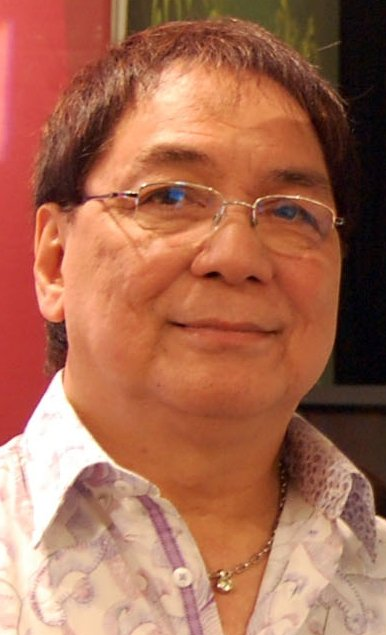
Joey de Leon

- Tito Sotto (since 1979)
- Vic Sotto (since 1979)
- Joey de Leon (since 1979)
- Jose Manalo (since 1994)
- Allan K. (since 1995)
- Wally Bayola (since 2000)
- Paolo Ballesteros (since 2001)
- Pauleen Luna (since 2005)
- Ryan Agoncillo (since 2009)
- Ryzza Mae Dizon (since 2012)
- Maine Mendoza (since 2015)
- Miles Ocampo (since 2022)
- Carren Eistrup (since 2023)
- Atasha Muhlach (since 2023)
- R'Bonney Gabriel (since 2025)
- Ian Red (since 2025)
- Julia Barretto (since 2025)
- Hyeonyul Kim (since 2025)

=== Former hosts ===
- Aicelle Santos (2016–17)
- Aiko Melendez (1989–95)
- Ai-Ai delas Alas (1995–2000)
- Alden Richards (2015–23)
- Alexa Miro (2023–24)
- Alfie Lorenzo
- Ali Sotto (1993–94)
- Alicia Mayer (2004–06)
- Amy Perez (1988–95)
- Anjo Yllana (1998–2020)
- Ariana Barouk (2008)
- Arra San Agustin (2023–24)
- BJ Forbes (2005–08)
- Baste Granfon (2015–21)
- Betong Sumaya (2023–24)
- Bianca Umali (2022–23)
- Buboy Villar (2023–24)
- Carmina Villarroel (1989–98)
- Cassy Legaspi (2023–24)
- Ces Quesada (1989)
- Charo Santos-Concio (1986–87)
- Chariz Solomon (2023–24)
- Chia Hollmann (2010–11)
- Chiqui Hollmann (1979–82)
- Christine Jacob (1991–98)
- Ciara Sotto (2005–07)
- Cindy Kurleto (2005–07)
- Coney Reyes (1982–91)
- Daiana Menezes (2007–12)
- Dasuri Choi (최다슬) (2014–16; 2020–21; 2023–24)
- Dawn Zulueta
- Dencio Padilla (1983)
- Derek Ramsay (2001–04)
- Diana Zubiri (2003–05)
- Dingdong Avanzado (1987–88)
- Dingdong Dantes
- Donita Rose (1996–97; 2002–03)
- Donna Cruz (1995–98)
- Edgar Allan Guzman (2006–07)
- Eric Quizon (1992–93; 1996–98)
- Francis Magalona (1995–2009)
- Gladys Guevarra (1999–2007)
- Glaiza de Castro (2023–24)
- Gretchen Barretto (1993)
- Helen Gamboa (1985–86)
- Helen Vela (1982–91)
- Herbert Bautista (1989–92)
- Ice Seguerra (1987–97; 2023)
- Isabelle Daza (2011–14)
- Isko Moreno (2023–24)
- Iza Calzado (2005; 2011–12)
- Janice de Belen (early 1990s)
- Janno Gibbs (2001–07)
- Jaya (1997–99)
- Jenny Syquia (1997)
- Jericho Rosales (1996–97)
- Jimmy Santos (1983–2022)
- Joey Albert
- Jomari Yllana (2000)
- John Prats
- Joyce Jimenez (1997)
- Joyce Pring (2014, Trip na Trip)
- Julia Clarete (2005–16)
- K Brosas (2001–03)
- Keempee de Leon (2004–16)
- Kitty Girls (2009)
- Kokoy de Santos (2023–24)
- Kris Aquino (1988–89)
- Lady Lee (1990–97)
- Lana Jalosjos (2004–06)
- Lance Serrano (2013)
- Lani Mercado (1989–90)
- Lindsay Custodio (1998)
- Lougee Basabas (2007–09)
- Luane Dy (2017–19)
- Maja Salvador (2021–23)
- Manilyn Reynes (1985–90)
- Marian Rivera (2014–15)
- Maricel Soriano (1985–87; 1995–96)
- Maureen Wroblewitz (2018–19)
- Mavy Legaspi (2023–24)
- Michael Sager (2023–24)
- Michael V. (2003–16)
- Michelle van Eimeren (1994)
- Mickey Ferriols (1998–2000)
- Mitoy Yonting (1997; 2006–09)
- Niño Muhlach (early 1990s)
- Nova Villa (1989–95)
- Ogie Alcasid (1988–89)
- Onemig Bondoc (1996–97)
- Paolo Contis (2023–24)
- Patricia Fernandez (2010, official photographer, Bulagaan)
- Patricia Tumulak (2015–17)
- Pepe Pimentel (1980s)
- Phoemela Baranda (2001–02)
- Pia Guanio (2003–21)
- Pops Fernandez (1987–88)
- Randy Santiago (1995)
- Raqi Terra (2018–19)
- Richard Hwan (2014–15)
- Richie D'Horsie (1979–85; 1994; 2009, Bababoom)
- Rio Diaz (1990–96)
- Rosanna Roces (1998)
- Ruby Rodriguez (1991–2021)
- Ruffa Gutierrez (1995–98)
- Ruru Madrid (2022–23)
- Sam Y.G. (2009–16)
- Sarah Lahbati (2018)
- SexBomb Girls (1999–2011)
- Sharon Cuneta (1983–84)
- Sherilyn Reyes-Tan (2000–01)
- Sheryl Cruz (1985–89)
- Shine Kuk (국선영) (2014–15)
- Solenn Heussaff (2012)
- Sugar Mercado (2001–02; 2004–07)
- Sunshine Cruz (1995–96)
- Taki Saito (2016–17)
- Tanya Garcia (2005)
- Tetchie Agbayani (1980s)
- That's My Bae (2015–19)
- Toni Gonzaga (2002–05)
- Toni Rose Gayda (1996–2014)
- Tugue Zombie (2023)
- Universal Motion Dancers (1990s)
- Val Sotto (1994)
- Valerie Weigmann (2013–14)
- Vina Morales
- Winwyn Marquez (2023–24)
- Yasser Marta (2023–24)
- Yoyong Martirez (1994)
- Zoren Legaspi (1989–95)

== Segments ==
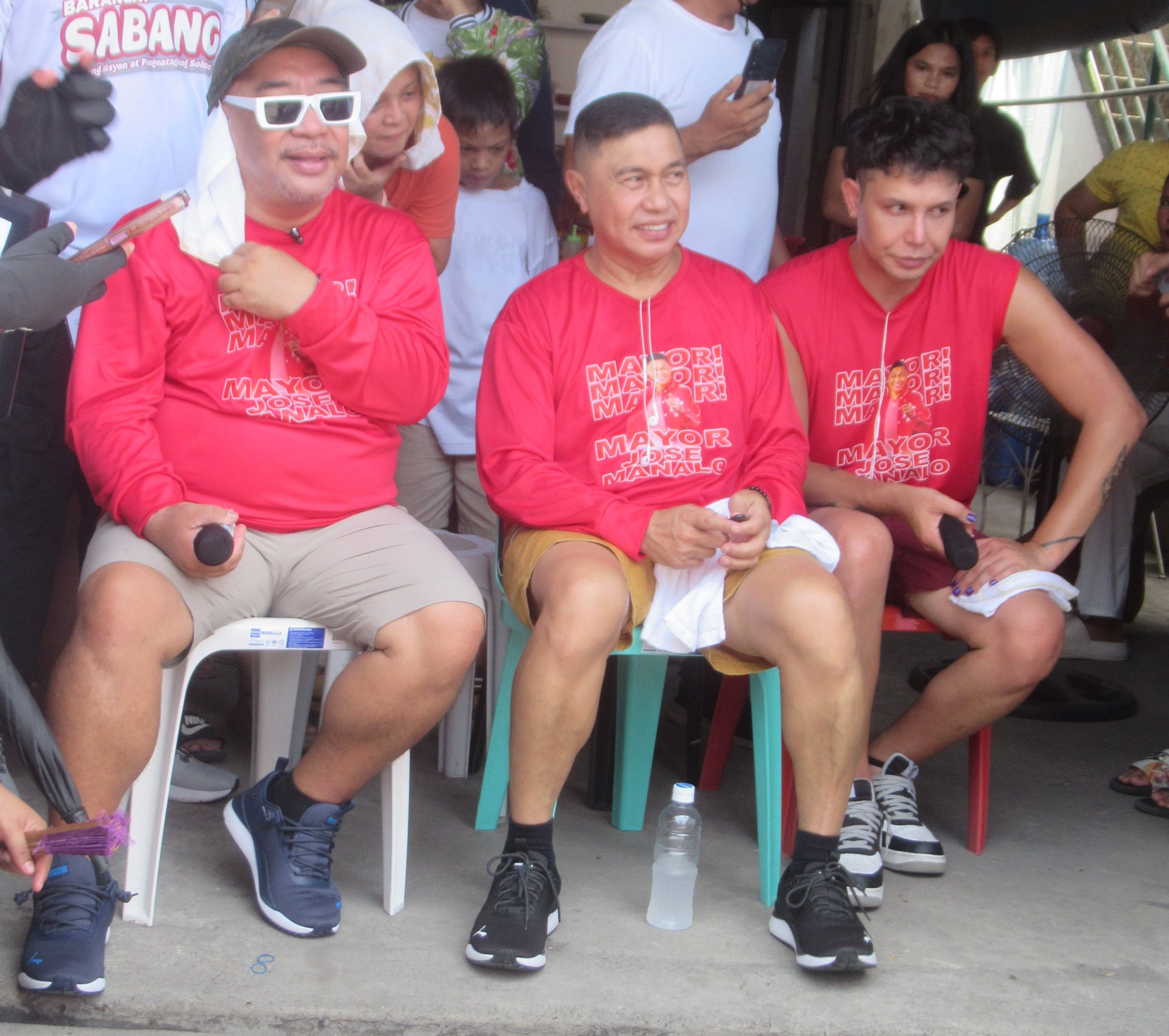
"JoWaPao" (Jose Manalo, Wally Bayola and Paolo Ballesteros)

- Sugod Bahay, Mga Kapatid! – primarily hosted by Jose Manalo, Wally Bayola and Paolo Ballesteros, with Ryan Agoncillo, Ryzza Mae Dizon, Maine Mendoza and Miles Ocampo serve as substitute hosts. The segment's concept is derived from the show's popular segment and predecessor, Juan for All, All for Juan, where hosts provide assistance and prizes to locals. The signature segment portrays Jose Manalo as the "Mayor ng Buong Bansa" (transl. mayor of the whole country) for life. His perpetual “term” bestows laughter and prizes during his daily visits of constituents, co-barangays, and the Dabarkads.
- Gimme 5: Laro ng mga Henyo – challenges the knowledge and logical thinking of each pair of contestants, who are tested under time pressure. The segment has a combined concept from the American game show Family Feud and the show's popular segment and predecessor, Pinoy Henyo. The segment has introduced characters made using artificial intelligence, deepfake technology, and text-to-speech software who serve as hosts and remind the contestants about each round's mechanics.
- Peraphy (stylized as PERAPhY) – challenges the studio player's thinking strategy. It involves oversized playing cards faced with fruits that consists of 13 cards per fruit (banana, mango, pineapple, and watermelon) numbered 1–13. The goal is to complete a row of cards by correctly guessing whether the next one is Higher (Pataas) or Lower (Pababa) in value, with the initial prize potentially being doubled or cut in half in the final round. It also features the TVJ Singing Queens (Eunice Janine, Anne Ferrer, Jean Drilon, Samantha Rascal, and Khayzy Bueno), who handle the playing cards. The segment shares similarities with the show's original segment, Hi-Lo Todo Panalo which based on the American television game show, Card Sharks.
- Barangay Bulagaan (referred as Bulagaan and previously Bulagaan University) – features the hosts delivering knock-knock jokes and pick-up lines paired with their song of choice. Originally held in a classroom setting, it now takes place in an eatery owned by Ryzza Mae Dizon's character, Miss Tapsi.
- Mr. Cutie: Boys Got Talent (2023–24) – a talent search for handsome, confident, and talented young men based on the show's original segment Mr. Pogi. It premiered on October 4, 2023, and aimed to discover the next heartthrob sensation. On January 20, 2024, Lance Aceron was declared the grand winner.

== Ratings ==
According to AGB Nielsen Philippines' Mega Manila household television ratings, the show had its highest rating on October 24, 2015, with a 50.8% rating during the Tamang Panahon special.

== Controversies ==
- In January 2006, hosts Vic Sotto and Joey de Leon publicly apologized for "uttering vulgar words" and "cracking lewd jokes" during the Bulagaan segment of the show. De Leon jokingly remarked that host Francis Magalona would impregnate fellow host Julia Clarete and told Pauleen Luna that she would get pregnant. Movie and Television Review and Classification Board reprimanded de Leon in a memorandum. Also included in the memo was host Jose Manalo, who jokingly branded people from Quiapo as snatchers during the show's Mr. Pogi segment.
- On February 3, 2007, during a dance showdown between the show's two dance groups, SexBomb Girls and EB Babes, Mhyca Bautista of the SexBomb Girls allegedly scratched EB Babe Kim, resulting in a rivalry between the dance groups.
- On September 2, 2013, a video of host Wally Bayola was posted online where he appeared to be having an affair with an EB Babe dancer. It led to Bayola's immediate suspension from the show for five months. He returned to the show on February 8, 2014.
- On September 5, 2013, MTRCB called the show's producers for a mandatory conference over "insensitive and unfriendly" scenes involving hosts Vic Sotto and Ryzza Mae Dizon.
- On July 9, 2016, MTRCB summoned the show's personnel after the remarks of host Tito Sotto during the Juan for All, All for Juan segment, where a contestant shared her past sexual abuse, leading to accusations of Sotto promoting rape culture and victim shaming.
- In October 2017, host Joey De Leon apologized after he made a statement in the show about depression being a "made-up illness". He said his family explained the seriousness of his statements.
- On May 31, 2023, hosts Tito Sotto, Vic Sotto and Joey de Leon announced their resignation from TAPE Inc. after they were barred from airing the show live. It was followed by the resignation of the show's other hosts and production team members. In August 2023, it led to an investigation by MTRCB to ensure compliance on broadcasting regulations.
- On June 2, 2023, Tito Sotto, Vic Sotto and Joey de Leon filed a petition for the cancellation of TAPE Inc.'s trademark renewal for the title "Eat Bulaga!". On December 5, 2023, Intellectual Property Office of the Philippines' Bureau of Legal Affairs cancelled the trademark renewal and credited the Sotto brothers and de Leon as the owner of the title "Eat Bulaga!".
- On June 30, 2023, Tito Sotto, Vic Sotto, and Joey de Leon filed a copyright infringement and unfair competition case against TAPE Inc. and GMA Network Inc. for "unauthorized airing" of the show and "misuse" of the title, Eat Bulaga!. On January 6, 2024, the Regional Trial Court branch 273 of Marikina ordered TAPE Inc. and GMA Network to cease the usage of the trademarks such as "EB", "Eat Bulaga" and the Eat Bulaga! theme song, in its programming, as the petition of the Sotto brothers and de Leon on its copyright case was granted.
- On August 10, 2023, during a sketch comedy in Sugod Bahay, Mga Kapatid! segment, Wally Bayola uttered off-screen the Tagalog profanity "putang-ina", causing a stir among the audience. Bayola apologized for the incident a day after, stating he made a mistake. On the same day, the Movie and Television Review and Classification Board issued a notice to the production group for a hearing on August 14, 2023, regarding Bayola's profanity utterance.
- On September 9, 2023, TAPE Inc. gained access to the original YouTube channel of the show. Tito Sotto, Vic Sotto and Joey de Leon planned to file legal action against TAPE Inc. for its "forced" acquisition of the YouTube account, an action deemed to constitute a cybercrime.
- On September 23, 2023, Joey de Leon joked about the noose as a common neck accessory during Gimme 5: Laro ng mga Henyo which caused controversy as it was widely interpreted as a reference to suicide by hanging and was deemed callous and insensitive by both viewers and mental health advocates. Creative director Jeny Ferre apologized to MTRCB for De Leon's brief verbal remarks, acknowledging that they insinuated suicide and expressing regret for those who were hurt.

== Spin-offs and international versions ==
- Eat Na Ta! is a half-hour variety show broadcast by GMA Cebu which served as pre-programming to Eat Bulaga!. The show originally aired on Super Radyo DYSS 999 kHz as a daily game show before it became a television variety show.
- Eat Bulaga! Indonesia premiered on July 16, 2012, on SCTV Network.
- On November 17, 2014, The New Eat Bulaga! Indonesia premiered on ANTV. It retained some hosts from the first incarnation, including Uya Kuya, Farid Aja, and Reza Bukan, while adding new co-hosts. The program also introduced renamed versions of segments from the earlier Indonesian edition, such as Indonesia Pintar, which became Tokcer (Otak Encer). On January 30, 2023, The New Eat Bulaga! Indonesia returned and ended on February 17, 2023.
- Eat Bulaga! Myanmar was announced on July 30, 2019, as second international franchise, marking Eat Bulaga!'s 40th anniversary. Production was delayed due to internal armed conflict and the COVID-19 pandemic.
