= The Lolas' Beautiful Show =

Philippine television talk show

- Title card
- Genre: Talk show; Comedy
- Developed by: Jose Mari Abacan; Lia Domingo; Cyril Ramos; Jerome Zamora
- Written by: Robert Raz; Charlotte Dianco; Ma. Acy Ramos; Michelle Ngu
- Creative director: Jenny Ferre
- Presented by: Wally Bayola; Jose Manalo; Paolo Ballesteros
- Country of origin: Philippines
- Original language: Tagalog
- No. of episodes: 95

Production
- Executive producer: Adrian Raphael V. Santos
- Producers: Antonio P. Tuviera; Jacqui L. Cara; Michael Tuviera; Jojo C. Oconer; Ramel L. David; Camille G. Montaño
- Production locations: Shooting Gallery Studios, Makati, Philippines
- Editors: Bong Guillermo; Tara Illenberger
- Camera setup: Multiple-camera setup
- Running time: 15–30 minutes
- Production company: TAPE Inc.

Original release
- Network: GMA Network
- Release: September 25, 2017 – February 2, 2018

Related
- Kalyeserye

The Lolas' Beautiful Show (transl. the grandmothers' beautiful show) is a Philippine television comedy talk show broadcast by GMA Network. Hosted by Wally Bayola, Jose Manalo and Paolo Ballesteros, it premiered on September 25, 2017 on the network's morning line up. The show concluded on February 2, 2018, with a total of 95 episodes.

== Premise ==
A spin-off of Kalyeserye segment of Eat Bulaga! as Bayola, Manalo and Ballesteros reprise their roles as Nidora Zobeyala, Tinidora Zobeyala and Tidora Zobeyala, respectively.

== Ratings ==
According to AGB Nielsen Philippines' Nationwide Urban Television Audience Measurement People in television homes, the pilot episode of The Lolas' Beautiful Show earned a 4.4% rating. The final episode scored a 3.5% rating.
