= Scaregivers =

- Official movie poster
- Directed by: Uro Q. dela Cruz
- Written by: Jourdan Sebastian
- Produced by: Antonio P. Tuviera; Michael Tuviera; Marvic Sotto
- Starring: Jose Manalo; Wally Bayola; Iza Calzado; Paolo Contis; Ehra Madrigal; Vic Sotto
- Cinematography: Nap Jamir II
- Edited by: Reggie Gulle
- Music by: Vincent de Jesus
- Production companies: APT Entertainment; M-Zet Productions
- Distributed by: Regal Entertainment
- Release date: November 26, 2008 (Philippines)
- Running time: 108 minutes
- Country: Philippines
- Language: Filipino

Scaregivers is a 2008 Filipino horror-comedy film written by Jourdan Sebastian and directed by Uro Q. dela Cruz, starring Wally Bayola and Jose Manalo.

== Plot ==
Crooks Bob and Billy steal some jewelry while the employees are busy. They are captured and imprisoned, but devise a plan. They put seals on their attorney's peanut butter jar and pass them off as stool samples then devour it on front of the court, which decides they are insane and send them to a mental institution.

The duo immediately build a plan to escape the facility, by hiding in caskets ready for burial. Then their accomplice will exhume them and let them escape. But their plan had a problem, a nurse, Marcia Cunanan acts as their nurse-in-charge, as well as Dr. Jessica Lopez the head doctor, forcing them in horrific situations. During their stay they hear a story about Ramil who claims to be a criminal that acts insane in order to escape the law and tried to escape by pretending to be dead and gets buried in the next door cemetery but died as a result. The duo try to pull off the same plan, but later split when Billy hesitates and tries to find another way out.

Bob is buried, but his accomplice (their attorney) gets into a car accident. Marcia is revealed to be a ghost, jealous because Ramil loved Jessica more than her, and after committing suicide starts terrorizing the duo. Ramil, after he is buried alive along with Marcia reveals himself as a ghost, wrestles control on them and saves them.

Days later, the duo relent and confess their sins, the corpses are reburied, and years later, they volunteer in the same facility as caregivers.

== Cast ==
- Jose Manalo as Billy
- Wally Bayola as Bob
- Iza Calzado as Nurse Marcia Cunanan
- Paolo Contis as Ramil
- Ehra Madrigal as Dra. Jessica Lopez
- Vic Sotto as Specialist Doctor
- Ryan Yllana as Atty. Denmark
- Boy Abunda as Talk Show Host
- Marian Rivera as Jewelry Shop Saleslady
- Julia Clarete as Policewoman
- John Apacible as Ramon
- Jourdan Sebastian as Peter
- Lilia Cuntapay as Tandang Luring
- Edgar Allan Guzman as Orderly 1
- Arkin da Silva as Orderly 2
- Menggie Cobarrubias as Jewelry Shop Manager
- Carlito Campos as TV Reporter
- Perry Escaño as Dr. Joey
- Jack Rodrigo as Paul
- J.B. de Leon as Jack
- Myrnell Trinidad as Cecilia
- Eddie Geronimo as Multong Frog
- Nonong de Andres as Prison Cell Mayor
- Michael Yonting as Pulis 1
- Tado Jimenez as Pulis 2
- Ricky Tangco as Pulis 3
