= D' Kilabots: Pogi Brothers (Weh?) =

D' Kilabots: Pogi Brothers (Weh?!?)
- Directed by: Soxie M. Topacio
- Written by: Phil M. Noble
- Produced by: Ramel L. David; Joselito C. Oconer; Michael B. Tuviera; Eduardo B. Tuviera; Malou Choa-Fagar; Allan Quilantang
- Starring: Jose Manalo; Wally Bayola; Pokwang
- Cinematography: Mackie Galvez
- Edited by: Tara Illenberger
- Music by: Vincent de Jesus
- Production companies: M-Zet Productions; APT Entertainment
- Release date: November 28, 2012
- Running time: 105 minutes
- Country: Philippines
- Languages: Filipino; English
- Box office: ₱42,392,978.00

D' Kilabots: Pogi Brothers (Weh?!?) is a 2012 Filipino romantic comedy film directed by Soxie M. Topacio. The film stars Jose Manalo, Wally Bayola, Solenn Heussaff, Pokwang, Paolo Ballesteros and Gina Pareño. It was made after Jose Manalo and Wally Bayola hit it big with a sold-out concert.

== Synopsis ==
Two brothers become rivals in the affections of the same woman. Their rivalry tears them apart, and causes one of them to be heartbroken. But the two are forced to reunite in order to protect their family from a greedy businessman.

== Cast ==
=== Main cast ===
- Jose Manalo as Justine Kilabot
- Wally Bayola as Bruno Kilabot
- Pokwang as Kitty Kilabot
- Solenn Heussaff as Lulu
- Paolo Ballesteros as Tweety

=== Supporting cast ===
- Gina Pareño as Sophia Kilabot
- Jimmy Santos as Jai-ho
- Mosang as J-Lo
- Diego Llorico as Ngengio
- Tirso Cruz III as Donald Trang
- Michael de Mesa as Mr. Lucio

=== Special Participation ===
- Allan K. as Security Guard
- Maricel Soriano as Female Partner
- Roderick Paulate as Male Partner
- Vic Sotto as Bossing Chairman
- German Moreno† as Kuya Hermano
- Victor Basa as Police Officer
- Michael V. as MMDA Traffic Enforcer
- Aljur Abrenica as Police Officer
- Eddie Garcia† as Police Superintendent
- Niña Jose as Justine's suitor
- Nyoy Volante as Guitarist
- Janica Pareño as Donald's maid

== Reception ==
Professional ratings
Review scores
Source	Rating
Click The City	1.5/5 stars
Pisara	1/5 stars

=== Critical response ===
Philbert Ortiz Dy of ClickTheCity.com rated the film 1.5 out of 5. He stated, "The end credits of D'Kilabots Pogi Brothers, Weh? share space with little vignettes of the two lead actors thanking the various guest stars of the movie for showing up. Many of these stars end up making the same joke: that they aren’t getting paid. These vignettes sum up the problem with the movie as a whole. For one thing, much of the movie seems to have been designed around these cameo appearance. And secondly, the movie has a tendency to repeat its humor. These problems are compounded by an odd production that can’t seem to decide what the name of one of the characters is."

=== Rating ===
It was graded "PG-13" by the Cinema Evaluation Board of the Philippines.

== Trivia ==
- The main characters are derived from name of artists, singer, song, politicians, businessmen and toys
- This is also second film of Jose Manalo and Wally Bayola under APT Entertainment and M-Zet TV Production Inc. after the success of their first film Scaregivers (2008)
- The film features actors and actresses from all 3 networks: GMA Network, ABS-CBN and TV5
