= Soxie Topacio =

Filipino comedian, actor, writer, and director (1952-2017)

- Born: Socrates Hernandez Topacio; June 19, 1952; Manila, Philippines
- Died: July 21, 2017 (aged 65); Manila, Philippines
- Other name: Soxie
- Occupations: actor, comedian, writer, director
- Years active: 1974–2016

Socrates Hernandez Topacio (June 19, 1952 – July 21, 2017), known professionally as Soxie Topacio, was a Filipino comedian, actor, writer and director.

== Early life, education and career ==
Topacio was born on June 19, 1952, in Manila, Philippines. He studied at the University of the Philippines Diliman, shifting in at least three courses until he dropped out to focus on a burgeoning showbiz career.

Topacio joined Philippine Educational Theater Association in 1969 and has been involved with several of its productions. He was given a lifetime achievement award by Philstage. Film director Lino Brocka introduced him to television and allowed him to direct productions in another medium.

Topacio dabbled in acting. Despite being publicly known as a homosexual, he also portrayed characters who are straight in film, such as in Tatlong Taong Walang Diyos; later in his career, he portrayed gay characters on television.

Topacio was nominated in the 1977 FAMAS Awards for Best Production Design for Mortal. Topacio directed Grandpa Is Dead, the Philippine entry for the 2010 Academy Awards for Best Foreign Language Film.

== Filmography ==
=== Actor for Theater ===
- willow tree - araullo high school 1968/ director: Melvi Pacubas
- kintin - araullo high school 1969/ dir: Melvi Pacubas
- indio - PETA 1969/ dir: Nonon Padilla jr.
- dumb waiter - PETA 1970/ dir: Jonas Sebastian
- tatay mong kalbo - PETA 1970/ dir: Cecile Guidote
- donya clara - PETA 1971/ dir: Cecile Guidote
- labyrinth - PETA 1971/ dir: Ladislav Smocek
- tao - PETA 1971/ dir: Cecile Guidote
- Chinese wall - PETA 1972/ dir: Brooks Jones
- kalbaryo - PETA 1972/ dir: Brooks Jones
- butihing babae ng setsuan - PETA 1972/ dir: Brooks Jones
- halimaw - PETA 1971 dir: Nonon Padilla jr.
- subu - PETA - 1971/ dir: Ahmed Zaki
- inspektor heneral - PETA 1972/ dir: Gardy Labad
- aidao - PETA 1972/ dir: Cecile Guidote
- paglilitis ng mag serapio - PETA 1972/ dir: Nonon Padilla jr.
- ang piging - PETA 1973/ dir: Soxie H. Topacio
- ay puso - Babaylan 1974/ dir: Dez Bautista
- man with the flower in his mouth - / Loretta Lichauco
- kabesang tales - PETA 1974 dir: Nonon Padilla jr.
- moniko at ang higante - PETA 1974 dir: Nonon Padilla jr.
- dupluhang bayan - PETA 1974/ dir: gardy Labad
- ang tao hayop o tao / dir: Nanding Josef
- awit na Hindi matapus tapos - PETA 1975/ dir: Soxie H. topacio
- artista sa palengke - PETA 1976/ dir: Maryo delos Reyes
- boys in the band - 1977/ dir: Tony Espejo
- hatol ng guhit na bilog - PETA 1974/ dir: Fritz Bennewitz
- flores para los muertos - PETA 1975/ dir: Lino Brocka
- lalake, babae atbp - PETA 1977/ dir: Orlando Nadres
- senaculo - dir: Eddie Infante
- ten little fairies - / dir: Tony Espejo
- bombita - Gantimpala / dir: Tony Espejo
- panunuluyan - PETA/ dir: Joel Lamangan
- hanggang dito na lamang at maraming salamat po / dir: Orlando Nadres
- hobe - PETA 1978/ dir: Gardy Labad
- casa de verde - / dir: maryo de los Reyes
- macbeth - PETA / dir: Fritz Bennewitz
- sex a deal - / dir: Maryo de los Reyes
- one man show /
- faust - PETA/ dir: Fritz Bennewitz
- show girls - Green room/ dir: Roni Bertubin
- romulus d greyt - PETA 2007/ dir: Maribel Legarda

=== Actor for Film ===
- May Isang Brilyante (1973) / Romy Suzara
- Lupang Hinirang (1973) / Orlando Nadres
- Tatlo, Dalawa, Isa (1974) / Lino Brocka
- Hello... Goodnight... Goodbye (1975)
- Tag-ulan sa Tag-araw (1975) / Celso Ad Castillo
- Tatlong Taong Walang Diyos (1976) / Mario O'Hara
- Tisoy (1977) / Ishmael Bernal
- Ibalik Mo ang Araw sa Mundong Makasalanan (1978) / Lupita Kashiwahara
- Ang Tatay Kong Nanay (1978) / Lino Brocka
- Bomba Star (1978) / Joey Gosiengfiao
- Dodong Diamond (1978) / Emmanuel H. Borlaza
- Ang Tsimay at ang Tambay (1979) / Junn P. Cabreira
- Vontes 5 (1979) / Jun Urbano
- High School Circa '65 (1979) / Maryo delos Reyes
- Mr. One-Two-Three (1980) / Mike Relon Makiling
- Unang Yakap (1980) / Eddie Rodriguez
- Blue Jeans (1981) / Joey Gosiengfiao
- Kontrobersyal! (1981) / Lino Brocka
- Burgis (1981) / Lino Brocka
- Mag-toning Muna Tayo (1981) / Mike Relon Makiling
- Anak ni Brocka (2005) / Zieg
- Pedrong Palad / Nick de Ocampo
- Ang Totoong Buhay ni Pacita M. (1991) / Elwood Perez
- Ispiritista: Itay, May Moomoo (2005) / APT Entertainment / Tony Reyes
- Big Time (2005)
- Twilight Dancers (2006) / Mel Chionglo
- La Funeraria Toti / Rhayan Carlos
- Bwakaw (2012) – Zaldy
- Gangster Lolo (2014)

=== Actor for Television ===
- Duplex - channel 9
- Pitik Bulag - Channel 4
- It's a Deal - Channel 9
- Ready Na Ako Direk - Channel 9
- Lucky 13 - Channel 13
- several guesting in several TV shows since 1971

=== Director for film ===
- Ikaw Na Sana - (1994) Regal Films
- Reyna: ang makulay na pakikipagsapalaran ng mga achucherva, achuchuva, achechenes... (2006) VIVA Films
- Puso 3 (2006) a 3-episode Indie with Rhayan Carlos and Peque Gallaga
- Grandpa Is Dead - (2009) APT Entertainment
- D' Kilabots Pogi Brothers Weh?! - (2012) APT Entertainment, M-Zet Productions
- The Adventures of Pureza: Queen of the Riles - (2011) Star Cinema

=== Director for television ===
==== TV series ====
- True Stories - Hosted by Rosa Rosal
- Carmi (martin)
- Kristal (Lani Mercado)
- POPCOM (12 episodes -maynila)
- Komiks
- Dear Diary
- Ikaw Lang Ang Mamahalin
- Pira-pirasong Pangarap
- Daboy en Da girl
- Marinara
- Nuts Entertainment
- Maynila - Hosted by Lito Atienza
- Family Zoo
- Takeshi's Castle
- Bahay Mo Ba 'To?
- Kung Mawawala Ka
- Impostora
- Atlantika
- Sa Iyong Paglisan
- O Mare Ko
- Joey's Quirky World
- several GMA telesines and other drama anthologies
- My Driver Sweet Lover
- Ang Utol Kong Hoodlum
- Regal Shocker

=== Director for theater ===
- Ang Babae sa Bote - PETA
- Hayop man ay Lumuluha rin - PETA
- Ang piging - PETA
- Iskandalo sa Laot - PETA
- Lazy John meets Yvonne darna
- Indarapatra - PETA
- Awit na Hindi Matapus-tapos - PETA
- Madilim ang Gabi sa Laot - PETA
- Monumento - PETA
- Peryante - PETA
- Magsasaka - Gantimpala
- Joe Hill - PETA
- Mariang Aliw - PETA
- Canuplin - PETA
- Kasalan sa Likod ng Simbahan
- Filipinas Circa 1906 - PETA
- Oppenheimer - PETA
- Feel na Feel
- Panata sa Kalayaan - PETA
- Amah-Maid in Hongkong - PETA
- Apat sa Langit
- Mac-liing Dulag - PETA
- Halik ng Tarantula - PETA
- Minsa'y Isang Gamu-gamo - PETA
- Paano ko pinatay si Diana Ross - PETA
- US Bases -/ UP Rep.
- Bathala - PETA
- DH - PETA
- Smokey Mountain
- 1896 - PETA
- Hanggang Dito na Lamang at Maraming salamat po - PETA
- Romeo and Juliet D Komedi - PETA
- Tatlong Pera - PETA
- Jesus Christ Superstar
- The Bomb - PETA
- Boto ni Botong - PETA
- El Filibusterismo - Gantimpala
- Himala - Tanghalan Pilipino
- Hipo
- Illusiyonada
- Ang Palasyo ni Valentin - PETA
- Rosas (lab plays) - PETA
- Ang Kamera ni Mang Leon - PETA
- Bombita - Gantimpala
- Tosca - PETA
- Noli Fili Dekada 200 - PETA
- Prinsesa Perlita - Paranaque

=== Writer ===
- Friends in Love for film(1983) (story)
- Diosa (for film)
- Ded na si Lolo (for film)
- Putting Buhok Putting Nitso (for television)
- Miss Magpapa-make - up ako (for Television)
- Tsikiting Masters - (for Film)

== Death ==
Topacio died on July 21, 2017. The news was confirmed by several posts from his friends in the film industry, who paid tribute to Topacio on social media. He was 65. According to a tweet from News5, the cause of death was lung cancer.

He was posthumously awarded Lamberto Avellana Memorial Award by the Film Academy of the Philippines in the 2019 Luna Awards.
