= Sugar Mercado =

Filipino actress and dancer

- Born: Ma. Sugar Millares Mercado; Sept. 13, 1986 (age 40); Cavite, Philippines
- Occupations: Dancer, actress
- Years active: 2001–present
- Spouse: Patrick Sullano
- Children: 2

Ma. Sugar Millares Mercado (Tagalog pronunciation: [mɛɾˈkadɔ]) is a Filipino dancer and actress. She was originally a member of the Sexbomb Girls and one of the hosts of the popular GMA Network noontime variety show Eat Bulaga!. She was dropped by the show in 2007. She is a former co-host of a variety game program Wowowin.

== Biography ==
Ma. Sugar Millares Mercado is the youngest of four siblings who along with her family lived in Cavite. They lived in a temporary house on top of a hog shed which was built in a tract of land owned by her grandfather. She recounted that during her childhood, her family would sleep on strips of wood and that the roof over their heads would be constantly blown away during a typhoon.

During her junior year in high school, she toured with the Gen. Mariano Alvarez Technical High School Band as a majorette. Later, she would join television beauty contests particularly Eat Bulaga!'s "TV Babe" segment in 2001, she lost. Nevertheless, she was signed on to join the SexBomb Girls, an association that lasted less than a year. Sugar decided to finish her studies and three years later, she served a six-month stint with the ABS-CBN noontime variety show MTB: Ang Saya Saya 2002 edition. Six months later, she rejoined the SexBomb Girls and Eat Bulaga!.

It was during the segment Laban o Bawi that she figured in a freak mishap causing her to fall down and accidentally destroy the stage props inside the studio. Mercado's rising popularity reportedly caused a rift between the Eat Bulaga! management and the SexBomb Girls and amid much controversy, the two parted ways. She remained and is now one of the very popular members of the show. After Eat Bulaga was renewed for a new format, she did not come back as host of the show. She has now earned enough money to build a two-story house for her family in Cavite. She left Eat Bulaga! again, though, after some time.

Besides her regular appearances in the GMA Network sitcom Ful Haus, Mercado also performs at the Klownz and Zirkoh bars owned by fellow Eat Bulaga! member Allan K.

Mercado attended Trinity University of Asia in Quezon City with fellow actors Ahron Villena, Megan Young, Alfred Navarro, Che Tolentino, Charles Christianson, Kontin Roque, Sophia Montecarlo, Erich Gonzales, Alvin Aragon, Eslove Briones, Shey Bustamante, Joe Vargas and Marco Aytona. She has been formerly seen on her first dramatic performance and also her first GMA Telebabad, Zorro.

In 2010, Mercado appeared on Eat Bulaga! as a celebrity contestant of Pinoy Henyo. Plus, Mercado transferred to TV5. My Darling Aswang was her first show on with her former Ful Haus co-star Vic Sotto and Jose Manalo, and her recent show, Midnight DJ.

In 2011, Mercado was part of Willing Willie (now changed to Wil Time Bigtime) with former Wowowee host Willie Revillame.

In 2017, she appeared in Hay, Bahay! and in Wowowin after 5 years of hiatus in showbiz.

In 2020, Mercado guested in various GMA Network shows such as The Boobay and Tekla Show and Mars Pa More.

In 2025, Mercado was crowned Mrs. Universe Philippines and will compete at Mrs. Universe 2025 in Manila in October.

== Personal life ==
Mercardo was formerly married to Chinese businessman Kristoffer Jay Go. They have 2 daughters, Gabrielle Sophia born in 2013 and Olivia Isabelle born in 2015. The former couple's relationship began to deteriorate when Mr. Go subjected her to repeated physical, emotional and verbal abuse and threatened to kill her after leaving their house in July 2015. In November 2015, she filed a civil and criminal case against Mr. Go for violation of Republic Act 9263 or Anti-violence against Women and Children Act and fought for protection and joint custody of their 2 children before Quezon City Regional Trial Court.

She was in a long-term relationship with actor and TV host Willie Revillame for 7 years.

== Filmography ==
=== Film ===
- Ispiritista: Itay, May Moomoo (2005)
- Oh, My Ghost! (2006)
- Enteng Kabisote 3 (2006)
- Dobol Trobol: Let's Get Ready To Rambol (2008)
- I Love You To Death (2016)
- Barbi: D' Wonder Beki (2017)

=== Television ===
- MTB: Ang Saya Saya (2003) as herself (dancer)
- Eat Bulaga! as herself (dancer & host)
- Daisy Siete as Sugar
- Maynila (2005)
- Let's Get Aww! as herself
- Daddy Di Do Du as Sugar
- H3O: Ha Ha Ha Over
- Gandang Ricky Reyes as herself
- Mobile Kusina as herself
- Lagot Ka, Isusumbong Kita as Sugar
- Unang Hirit as herself
- Takeshi's Castle as Sadako Paroon
- Bahay Mo Ba 'To? episode: "The Bahay Mo Ba 'To Musical"
- Makita Ka Lang Muli as Andeng (2006–2007)
- Fulhaus (2007) as Toni
- Lipgloss (2008–2009)
- Zorro (2009) as Anna
- Party Pilipinas (2010)
- My Darling Aswang (2010) as Sugar
- Midnight DJ: Itim na Belo (2010)
- Wil Time Bigtime (2011-2012) - co-host
- Tropang Kulit (2013)
- Sunday All Stars (2013)
- Maalaala Mo Kaya (2013)
- Magpakailanman (2014)
- Mac & Chiz (2014)
- Wattpad Presents (2014)
- iBilib (2014)
- TSAS (The Sunday Afternoon Show) (2015) - Herself / Guest performer
- Sabado Badoo (2015) - Cameo guest footage
- Karelasyon (2015)
- Ismol Family (2015)
- Vampire ang Daddy Ko (2015)
- Dangwa (2015)
- Sunday PinaSaya (2016)
- Dear Uge (2016)
- Wowowin (2017)
- Hay, Bahay! (2017)
- Bubble Gang (2017)
- Sarap Diva (2017)
- Daddy's Gurl (2018)
- Tadhana (2018)
- Stories for the Soul (2018)
- Studio 7 (2018)
- Daig Kayo Ng Lola Ko (2019)
- The Boobay and Tekla Show (2019)
- All-Out Sundays (2020)
- Mars Pa More (2020)
- Regal Studio Presents (2021)
- Jose & Maria's Bonggang Villa (2022)
- Rainbow Rumble (2025) as herself (contestant)
- Stars on the Floor (season 2) (2026) as herself (contestant)
