= Ful Haus =

Philippine television sitcom series

- Title card
- Genre: Sitcom
- Directed by: Bert de Leon
- Starring: Vic Sotto; Pia Guanio
- Opening theme: "Ful Haus" by Francis Magalona and Gloc-9
- Country of origin: Philippines
- Original language: Tagalog
- No. of episodes: 107

Production
- Camera setup: Multiple-camera setup
- Running time: 42 minutes
- Production company: M-Zet Productions

Original release
- Network: GMA Network
- Release: August 5, 2007 – August 16, 2009

Ful Haus is a Philippine television sitcom series broadcast by GMA Network. Directed by Bert de Leon, it stars Vic Sotto and Pia Guanio. It premiered on August 5, 2007 on the network's KiliTV line up. The series concluded on August 16, 2009, with a total of 107 episodes.

== Cast and characters ==
Cast

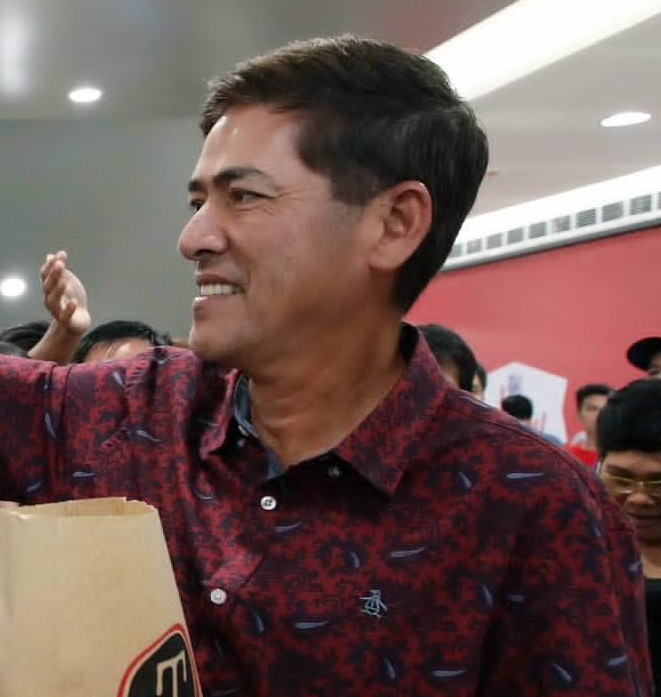
Vic Sotto

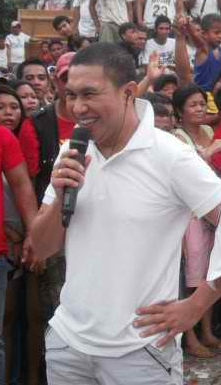
Jose Manalo

Lead cast

- Vic Sotto as Fulgencio "Ful" Palisoc
- Pia Guanio as Grace Palisoc

Supporting cast

- Jose Manalo as Juan Miguel "Onemig" Palisoc
- BJ Forbes as Juan Miguel "One-Two" Palisoc, Jr.
- Joonee Gamboa as Pidyong Palisoc
- Marissa Delgado as Andrea Palisoc
- Richie Reyes as Coco
- Jojo Bolado as Manny
- Mitoy Yonting as Buboy
- Sugar Mercado as Toni
- Patani Daño as herself
- Dax Martin
- Rita De Guzman

== Accolades ==
Accolades received by Ful Haus
Year	Award	Category	Recipient	Result	Ref.
2007	21st PMPC Star Awards for Television	Best Comedy Actor	Vic Sotto	Nominated	
2007	21st PMPC Star Awards for Television	Best Comedy Show	Ful Haus	Nominated	
2008	22nd PMPC Star Awards for Television	Best Comedy Actor	Vic Sotto	Nominated	
2008	22nd PMPC Star Awards for Television	Best Comedy Show	Ful Haus	Won	
2009	23rd PMPC Star Awards for Television	Best Comedy Actor	Vic Sotto	Nominated	
2009	23rd PMPC Star Awards for Television	Best Comedy Show	Ful Haus	Won	
2009	23rd PMPC Star Awards for Television	Best New Female TV Personality	Patani Daño	Nominated	
