= Dobol Trobol: Lets Get Redi 2 Rambol! =

- Directed by: Tony Y. Reyes
- Written by: R.J. Nuevas; Tina Samson; Mon Roco
- Produced by: Rodolfo V. Quizon; Vic Sotto; Antonio P. Tuviera
- Starring: Dolphy; Vic Sotto
- Cinematography: Gary Gardoce
- Edited by: Kelly Cruz
- Music by: Michael Alba
- Distributed by: RVQ Productions; M-Zet Productions; APT Entertainment; Regal Entertainment
- Release date: August 13, 2008
- Country: Philippines
- Languages: Filipino; English
- Box office: ₱90,507,251.00

Dobol Trobol: Lets Get Redi 2 Rambol! (lit. '"Double Trouble: Let's Get Ready to Rumble"') is a 2008 Filipino comedy film starring Dolphy and Vic Sotto. The film was a box office success, grossing ₱90.5 million.

== Plot ==
Mac works as a chef at a resort, with Bogart as his sous chef. Arthur "Turo", along with a gang, tries to target Mac's friend and the resort owner Mr. Toribio, but Turo relents, repulses the gang members and rescues Mr. Toribio. In turn, he is given a calling card for a job.

When Turo arrives at the resort, he is forced to take an exam by HR personnel, unaware that he was hired by Mr. Toribio himself. He is hired along with an applicant named Nemo. Mac thinks Turo is a guest but is shocked when he learns that he will join him as a partner, while Nemo acts as Bogart's partner. From there Mac's hatred and anger towards Turo begins, not only from being fooled, but when he is forced to share his room for the newcomer. A war starts between the two of them, with both pulling pranks on each other.

Things change when Mac's daughter, Boni arrives at the resort. Turo falls in love at her but is shocked when he finds out that Boni is Mac's daughter. He tries to make advances to Boni, to no avail, including stealing Mac's flowers, meeting up with her, and sending a paper plane containing a letter, which is intercepted by Mac, who in turn writes an expletives-laden reply and converts the Turo's letter into a Japanese Zero plane that fires bullets at a fleeing Turo as Mac shouts at him in a mix of broken Japanese and Filipino.

Mac's past is revealed when Boni wants him to attend her birthday along with her mother, Mac's estranged wife Gabriela, whom he fell out with after he refused her demands that he stop being a chef and run her company instead. Turo takes pity on Mac after seeing how his past has caused his work's quality to deteriorate. To help him, Turo, Mr. Toribio, Nemo and Bogart trick Mac by telling them they have a catering service in Manila, which turns out to be at his old house to celebrate Boni's birthday. Mac is shocked when he realizes that he has arrived at his own house and is confronted by Gabriela. Mac's team is placed under the supervision of the overly perfectionist and flamboyant Spanish head chef Paco. However, he is accidentally knocked out by a rolling pin, forcing Mac to take charge at Turo's urging. The party continues and Turo introduces Mac as the chef. Boni praises him while a grateful Gabriela reconciles with him, but a recovered Paco chases Turo and his team with a rolling pin. After the end of the party, Mac stays at his home, while Turo, Nemo and Bogart return to the resort.

Mac sees Turo packing his clothes, fulfilling his promise to Mac that he will leave the resort if he reconciles with his family, and to end his feelings to her daughter, but Boni disagrees and states that she loves Turo. Turo and Boni, and Mac and Gabriela, hug each other as separate couples, as Nemo knocks Bogart's head.

== Cast ==
- Dolphy† as Macario "Mac"
- Vic Sotto as Arthur "Turo" Calaycay
- Carmi Martin as Gabriela "Gabbi"
- Jose Manalo as Nemo Lindenburg
- Wally Bayola as Bogart
- Riza Santos as Bonifacia "Boni", daughter of Mac and Gabbi
- BJ Forbes as Moo / Nikki
- Pocholo Montes as Mr. Toribio

Special Participation

- Fritz Ynfante† as Chef Paco
- Sugar Mercado as Information Officer
- Ricky Davao† as Guest / Investor
- Dexter Doria as Guest / Investor
- Ya Chang as Guest
- Daiana Menezes as Vivian
- Epi Quizon as Guest
- Pia Guanio as Convenience Store Customer
- Zsa Zsa Padilla as Convenience Store Customer
- EB Babes as Guests / Billiards players

== Reception ==
=== Box office ===
The film was a box office success. The film grossed ₱44 million on its opening weekend. The film grossed a total of ₱90 million on its entire theatrical run.

== Awards ==
Year	Award-Giving Body	Category	Recipient	Result
2009	GMMSF Box-Office Entertainment Awards	Comedy Box-Office King/s	Dolphy and Vic Sotto	Won
