= Gladys Guevarra =

Filipina actress, singer and comedienne

- Born: February 22, 1977 (age 49); Olongapo, Zambales, Philippines
- Other name: Chuchay
- Occupations: Host, comedian, singer
- Years active: 1999–present
- Agent: APT Entertainment

Gladys Guevarra (born February 22, 1977) is a Filipino actress, singer and comedienne, and a former housemate in Pinoy Big Brother.

== Early life ==
Gladys Guevarra is a comedian and voice impersonator who previously worked in GMA Network, and was also the former lead vocalist of the band Gladys and the Boxers with K, in which they were noted for their hit song, "Sasakyan Kita" ("I'll ride with you"). She rose to prominence during her stint on GMA Network's noontime show Eat Bulaga!. She eventually left the show citing health reasons stemming from a bulging disk and scoliosis. But there were some rumors that she and co-host Janno Gibbs were removed from the show because of brewing a secret relationship. The former vehemently denies the allegations. She entered the Pinoy Big Brother House on Day 46 to fill one of the gaps left behind by Ethel and Mcoy with the other reoccupied by Gaby. To add further confusion and mystery to her identity before her entrance, she imitated the voices of Annabelle Rama and midget actress Mahal. She then left the house on Day 58 due to depression.

== Filmography ==
=== Film ===
Year	Title	Role
2003	Pangarap Ko Ang Ibigin Ka	TBA
2005	Ispiritista	Salve
2009	Ang Panday	Babang

=== Television ===
Year	Title	Role
1999–2007	Eat Bulaga!	Host
2003	Beh Bote Nga	Herself
2005–2007	H3O: Ha Ha Ha Over	Occasional Cast
2006	Todo Max	Host
2007	Magic Kamison	Chuchay
2007–2008	Pinoy Big Brother: Celebrity Edition 2	Housemate
2009	Cool Center	Guest
2009	Hole in the Wall	Studio Player
2009	All My Life	Luningning
2010	Family Feud	Player
2010	Take Me Out	Co-host
2010	Show Me Da Manny	Banig
2010	Koreana	Ada
2011–2012	Manny Many Prizes	Host
2012	Celebrity Bluff	Celebrity GangNammm
2012	Extra Challenge	Celebrity Challenger
2013	Sarap Diva	Herself
2013–2014	Chef Boy Logro: Kusina Master	Sous chef
2015–2019	Sunday PinaSaya	Mainstay
2017	Dear Uge	Guest
2019	Wowowin	Co-host
2020	Mars Pa More	Guest
2021	Anak ni Waray vs. Anak ni Biday	Leng
