= APT Entertainment =

Philippine television and film production company

APT Entertainment, Inc.
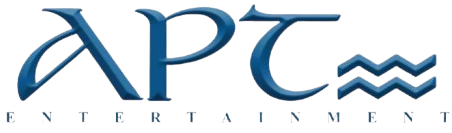
- Logo since 2004
- Type: Private
- Industry: Entertainment
- Predecessor: Multi-TeleVentures, Inc. (1982–1994)
- Founded: 1994; 32 years ago
- Founder: Antonio P. Tuviera
- Headquarters: 10 Jose Cruz St., Barangay Ugong, Pasig, Metro Manila, Philippines
- Area served: Worldwide
- Key people: Antonio P. Tuviera (Founder & Chairman); Michael B. Tuviera (President & CEO); Joselito C. Oconer (CFO & COO)
- Products: Television programs Films; Web portals

APT Entertainment, Inc. is a Philippine television and film production company based in Pasig. It was founded by TAPE's co-founder Antonio Tuviera in 1994. The company was best known for producing Eat Bulaga!, the country's longest-running live noontime variety program.

== Film production ==
=== As production company ===
| Release date | Title | Director | Note(s) | Ref(s). |
|---|---|---|---|---|
| September 11, 1996 | Lab en Kisses | Tony Y. Reyes | | |
| October 26, 2005 | Ispiritista: Itay, May Moomoo | Tony Y. Reyes | | |
| October 18, 2006 | TxT | Mike Tuviera | co-production with Regal Entertainment | |
| June 18, 2008 | Urduja | Reggie Entienza | Animated film | |
| August 13, 2008 | Dobol Trobol: Lets Get Redi 2 Rambol! | Tony Y. Reyes | | |
| November 26, 2008 | Scaregivers | Uro Q. dela Cruz | | |
| December 25, 2008 | Iskul Bukol 20 Years After: The Ungasis and Escaleras Adventure | Tony Y. Reyes | | |
| May 6, 2009 | Grandpa Is Dead | Soxy Topacio | Original title: Ded Na si Lolo | |
| May 20, 2009 | Litsonero | Lore Reyes | | |
| May 27, 2009 | Agaton & Mindy | Peque Gallaga | | |
| June 10, 2009 | Kamoteng Kahoy | Maryo J. de los Reyes | | |
| July 8, 2009 | Bente | Mel Chionglo | | |
| August 11, 2009 | Fuchsia | Joel Lamangan | | |
| August 19, 2009 | Love on Line (LOL) | Tony Y. Reyes | co-production with OctoArts Films and M-Zet TV Productions | |
| September 23, 2009 | Yaya & Angelina: The Spoiled Brat Movie | Michael Tuviera | Co-production with GMA Films | |
| December 25, 2009 | Ang Darling Kong Aswang | Tony Y. Reyes | co-production with OctoArts Films and M-Zet TV Productions | |
| December 25, 2010 | Si Agimat at si Enteng Kabisote | Tony Y. Reyes | co-production with OctoArts Films, M-Zet TV Productions and GMA Films | |
| April 23, 2011 | Pak! Pak! My Dr. Kwak! | Tony Y. Reyes | co-production with Star Cinema, OctoArts Films and M-Zet TV Productions | |
| December 25, 2011 | Enteng ng Ina Mo | Tony Y. Reyes | co-production with ABS-CBN Film Productions, Inc., OctoArts Films and M-Zet TV Productions | |
| July 21, 2012 | Bwakaw | Jun Robles Lana | co-production with Cinemalaya Foundation and Octobertrain Films; distributed by Star Cinema | |
| November 28, 2012 | D' Kilabots: Pogi Brothers (Weh?!?) | Soxie M. Topacio | co-production with M-Zet TV Productions | |
| December 25, 2012 | Si Agimat, si Enteng Kabisote at si Ako | Tony Y. Reyes | co-production with OctoArts Films, Imus Productions, M-Zet TV Productions and GMA Films | |
| October 18, 2013 | Barber's Tales | Jun Robles Lana | Original title: Mga Kuwentong Barbero co-production with Octobertrain Films | |
| December 25, 2013 | My Little Bossings | Marlon N. Rivera | co-production with OctoArts Films, M-Zet TV Productions and K Productions | |
| August 2, 2014 | The Janitor | Michael Tuviera | distributed by Star Cinema | |
| December 25, 2014 | My Big Bossing | Tony Y. Reyes, Marlon Rivera, Joyce Bernal | co-production with OctoArts Films and M-Zet TV Productions | |
| February 11, 2015 | Liwanag sa Dilim | Richard V. Somes | | |
| December 25, 2015 | My Bebe Love: #KiligPaMore | Jose Javier Reyes | co-production with co-production with M-Zet Productions, GMA Films and MEDA Productions | |
| July 13, 2016 | Imagine You and Me | Michael Tuviera | co-production with GMA Films and M–Zet TV Productions | |
| November 30, 2016 | Enteng Kabisote 10 and the Abangers | Marlon N. Rivera and Tony Y. Reyes | co-production with OctoArts Films and M-Zet TV Productions | |
| October 21, 2017 | Love Is... | Adolf Alix Jr. | Television film co-production with TAPE Inc. and GMA Films | |
| November 22, 2017 | Trip Ubusan: The Lolas vs. Zombies | Mark A. Reyes | co-production with M-Zet TV Productions; distributed by GMA Films | |
| December 25, 2017 | Meant to Beh | Chris Martinez | co-production with M-Zet TV Productions | |
| December 25, 2018 | Jack Em Popoy: The Puliscredibles | Mike Tuviera | co-production with CCM Film Productions and M-Zet TV Productions; distributed by Axinite Digicinema | |
| May 29, 2019 | Banal | Peter Abanna | | |
| October 16, 2019 | Isa Pa, with Feelings | Prime Cruz | co-production with Black Sheep Productions | |
| November 6, 2019 | Cara x Jagger | Ice Idanan | co-production with Cignal Entertainment | |
| December 25, 2019 | Mission Unstapabol: The Don Identity | Michael Tuviera | co-production with M-Zet TV Productions | |
| December 25, 2022 | My Teacher | Paul Soriano | uncredited; co-production with Ten17P, Tincan, DepEd Entertainment. Distributed by Black Cap Pictures and GMA Pictures | |
| December 25, 2023 | Rewind | Mae Cruz-Alviar | co-production with Star Cinema and AgostoDos Pictures | |
| December 25, 2024 | The Kingdom | Michael Tuviera | co-production with M-Zet TV Productions and MQuest Ventures | |
| June 17, 2026 | Never Change! | Marty Schousboe | co-production with All Things Comedy, American High, Drive True Productions, Freshman Year, Myriad Entertainment, Strawdogs Productions and Swindle Pictures | |
| November 11, 2026 | Remember | Mae Cruz-Alviar | co-production with ABS-CBN Studios, ABS-CBN Film Productions, Agosto Dos Pictures, and Regal Entertainment | |
| December 25, 2026 | The Greatest Showdown | Jun Robles Lana | co-production with ABS-CBN Studios, Star Cinema, IdeaFirst Company and M-Zet TV Productions | |

=== As distributor ===
- Txt (2006)
- Fuchsia (2009)
- Ded Na si Lolo (2009)
- Litsonero (2009)
- Agaton & Mindy (2009)
- Kamoteng kahoy (2009)
- Bente (2009)

=== As miscellaneous company ===
- Smith & Wesson (1988) – Filming facilities
- Iputok Mo... Dadapa Ako! (Hard to Die) (1990) – Filming facilities
- Ali in Wonderland (1992) - Filming facilities (uncredited)
- Sam & Miguel (Your Basura, No Problema) (1992) – Filming facilities
- Ang Tange Kong Pag-ibig (1992) – Filming facilities
- Hindi Pa Tapos ang Labada, Darling (1994) – Filming facilities
- GMA Telesine Specials: Sugat ng Inakay (1996) - TV Movie/Line Producer
- Lab en Kisses (1996) – Filming facilities
- Biyudo si Daddy, Biyuda si Mommy (1997) – Filming facilities

== Television productions ==
=== Currently produced shows ===
Aired on BuKo and TV5

- Maine Goals (2021–present)

=== Previously produced shows ===
- Betty and the Beast (1994), aired on GMA Network
- H3O: Ha Ha Ha! Over! (2005–2007), aired on QTV
- Sunday PinaSaya (2015–2019), aired on GMA Network
- Carpool (2020), aired on TV5
- Fill in the Bank (2020–2021) (as Archangel Media)
- Bawal Na Game Show (2020–2021) (as Archangel Media)
- Chika, Besh! (2020–2021) (as Archangel Media)
- POPinoy (2021) (as Archangel Media)
- Jose & Maria's Bonggang Villa (2022–2024), aired on GMA Network
- Wow Mali: Doble Tama (2023–2024), aired on TV5
- Padyak Princess (2024), aired on TV5
- Emojination (2023–2024; 2025), aired on TV5

=== Holy Week dramas ===
APT Entertainment Lenten Specials have traditionally been aired during Black Saturday on GMA Network and TV5 from 2000-2019, 2026–present.

The series is streaming online on YouTube.

| No. | Title | Main cast | Directed by | Written by | Original release date |
|---|---|---|---|---|---|
| 1 | "Marcelino" | Bryan Homecillo | Mel Chionglo | Jun Lana | April 22, 2000 |
Derived from the original story Marcelino Pan y Vino, about a boy who was adopted by priests in a monastery. Marcelino (Bryan Homecillo) would often run to the only friend he thinks he has, the man crucified at the cross. Supporting Cast: Joonee Gamboa, Pocholo Montes, Chinggoy Alonso, Carlos Morales, Nonie Buencamino, Shamaine Buencamino
| 2 | "Siyang Pinagpala" | Alessandra De Rossi | Mel Chionglo | Unknown | April 14, 2001 |
| 3 | "May Milagro Pa Nga Ba?" | Jaclyn Jose; Perla Bautista; Sylvia La Torre | Jeffrey Jeturian | Unknown | March 30, 2002 |
| 4 | "Via Cruces" | Paolo Bediones | Jose Rowell Ikamen | Roy Iglesias | April 19, 2003 |
The town's people to whom Dr. Jose Cruses (Paolo Bediones) has given medical services at no cost, felt terrified when they saw the dead body of the doctor, together with two more corpses of prisoners near the city jail. Dr. Cruses has been an instrument for the people of the town to face their fears and fight for their rights from the cruel town's governor. Supporting Cast: Marita Zobel, Nanding Josef, Mon Confiado, Shermaine Santiago, Menggie Cobarrubias, Archie Ventosa
| 5 | "Angel Villa" | Dennis Trillo | Khryss Adalia | Unknown | April 10, 2004 |
Supporting Cast: Aiza Marquez
| 6 | "Sa Kamay ng Diyos" | Dennis Trillo | Khryss Adalia | Cara Julian | March 26, 2005 |
A story about loss, acceptance and faith, Oliver (Dennis Trillo) is a teacher and a family man who is expecting his second child soon. Jomari (Phytos Ramirez) is a loving child and brother to his parents and sister. These two will cross paths and will draw strength from each other upon experiencing a devastating storm that took the lives of their families and several people within their community. Supporting Cast: Jojit Lorenzo, Ces Aldaba, Benjie Joson, Phytos Ramirez
| 7 | "Milagroso" | Cesar Montano, Sunshine Cruz | Jun Lana | Jun Lana | April 15, 2006 |
Arman's (Cesar Montano) hands are capable of healing what seems to be impossible, a gift the whole town believes to be given by God. Both married, Arman and Belen had an affair and unfortunately, Belen (Sunshine Cruz) became pregnant. To protect his reputation, Arman insisted on abortion, which led to several unfortunate events for the both of them. Supporting Cast: Nonie Buencamino, Shamaine Buencamino, Julia Clarete, Soliman Cruz, BJ Forbes
| 8 | "Unico Hijo" | Dennis Trillo, Eddie Garcia | Jun Lana | Jun Lana | April 7, 2007 |
Luke (Dennis Trillo), Mayor Eusebio's (Eddie Garcia) unico hijo, became the town's subject of interest for his being transsexual. He added up to the problems of his father’s upcoming campaign as claimed by many. Criticisms surrounded the family but Mayor Eusebio accepted his unico hijo with all his heart despite all the pains and disappointments he had caused him. Supporting Cast: Mylene Dizon, Eva Darren, Marcus Madrigal
| 9 | "Sentenciada" | Lorna Tolentino, Gina Pareño, Nonie Buencamino | Jun Lana | Jun Lana | March 22, 2008 |
Ellen (Lorna Tolentino) faces the trials of going back to normal life after being sentenced to ten years in prison. Her husband Rodel (Nonie Buencamino) never left her side. But her children hardly know her because of Amparo (Shamaine Buencamino), Rodel’s sister, who took over Ellen’s role as mother while she was behind bars. Supporting Cast: Irma Adlawan, Shamaine Buencamino, Kris Bernal, Steven Claude Goyong, Ella Guevarra
| 10 | "Sugat ng Kahapon" | Marian Rivera, Dennis Trillo | Mac Alejandre | Elmer Gatchalian | April 11, 2009 |
Torn between her duty to an abusive husband and selfless devotion to a intellectually disabled friend named Sonny (Dennis Trillo), Hilda (Marian Rivera) hesitantly allows him to stay in her home and take care of him. Aldo (Gardo Versoza) accuses Hilda of having an illicit affair with Sonny and he relentlessly beats Hilda. The witness of this violence triggers Sonny’s memory of a very traumatic childhood. Supporting Cast: Gardo Versoza, Perla Bautista, BJ Forbes
| 11 | "Anghel sa Lupa" | Marian Rivera | Joel Lamangan | Richard Cruz | April 3, 2010 |
On the road together with a friend one day, Marita (Glydel Mercado) accidentally hits a woman crossing the street. Her name is Teresa (Marian Rivera). The victim has been injured and unconscious so they decided to bring her home and let her stay there together with Marita's husband and children until she feels better. Teresa told them she was an angel but no one believes her. Teresa's stay with them slowly transformed Marita's broken household to a happy one. They were nearly convinced that she is indeed a heaven-sent angel until a tragedy happened. Supporting Cast: Glydel Mercado, Andrea Torres, John Apacible, Lucky Mercado, Arthur Solinap, Alliyah Fatima dela Riva, Gilleth Sandico, Benjie Felipe
| 12 | "Maestra" | Agot Isidro, Dennis Trillo | Jun Lana | Renei Dimla, Nathaniel Arciaga | April 23, 2011 |
Eloisa (Agot Isidro) is a widow. She spends most of her time raising her child, teaching at a public school and supporting her siblings. In the middle of her son Kiko's (Rocco Nacino) campaign, an accident happened and Martin (Dennis Trillo), the school janitor, would see the incident and would immediately rescue. With Eloisa's great gratitude, she became close to Martin. And the two started to have a relationship that would bring unexpected complications in their lives. Supporting Cast: Rocco Nacino, Andrea Torres, Erika Padilla, Anne Villegas, Rubi Rubi, Menggie Cobarrubias
| 13 | "Pinagpala sa Babaeng Lahat" | Lovi Poe, James Blanco | Jun Lana | Jun Lana | April 7, 2012 |
Having survived miraculously from an accident that claimed the lives of her parents, Claire (Lovi Poe) decides to become a nun and devote her life to God. She is devastated, however, when she had to leave the convent due to poor health. She settles down to a quiet life in a small town, regularly serving as a volunteer at her local church. Unexpectedly, Claire finds love in the person of Edgar (James Blanco). However, just as they are planning to get wed, Claire starts seeing visions and experiences strange physical sensations, until one day she wakes up with stigmata wounds on her hands. She eventually attracts a lot of attention and this, in time, isolates Edgar and causes embarrassment among his very conservative family. Now, Claire must choose between personal happiness and fulfilling God's call for her life. Supporting Cast: Ces Quesada, Erika Padilla, Vaness del Moral, Lui Manansala, Soliman Cruz
| 14 | "Perpetua" | Susan Roces, Boots Anson-Roa | Phil Noble | Phil Noble | March 30, 2013 |
Perpetua (Susan Roces), a young novice, was named after Our Lady of Perpetual Help. She was brought up by her religious mother, and was made to believe that a life in the convent was best for her. However, after merely two years as a postulant, she suddenly falls in love with Agustin (Lito Legaspi). Perpetua chooses to leave the convent and marry Agustin. She seemed to have made the right choice as heaven still seems to be showering her family with unending blessings. On Perpetua and Agustin’s 50th wedding anniversary, she discovers that Agustin actually has another wife — Adelaida (Boots Anson-Roa), whom he married long before he married Perpetua. This event causes her family to fall apart. And now she starts to question: Did heaven really shower her blessings, or was heaven just waiting for the right time to punish her for choosing love over spiritual vocation? Supporting Cast: Isay Alvarez, Jan Marini, Lito Legaspi, Robert Seña, Ryzza Mae Dizon, Gerald Pizzaras, Joyce Ching, Lucho Ayala
| 15 | "Panalangin" | Marian Rivera | Michael Tuviera | Ma. Acy Ramos | April 19, 2014 |
Life seemed perfect for Lauren (Marian Rivera) — a fulfilling job, happy family, and an upcoming wedding. But some good things don’t last. Tragedy struck as super typhoon Yolanda claimed the lives of her loved ones. Lauren feels she should have died along with them and immensely feels the tragic loss. Fate leads her to a young girl named Gelay (Angeli Nicole Sanoy) who seemed to embody the promises of life in her “bucket list.” Building another relationship wasn’t easy for Lauren, but Gelay eventually made her believe that there’s a silver lining at the end of the rainbow. Life almost seemed to become normal and happy again for Lauren. Until one day, she discovers that Gelay is terminally ill, hence she has a bucket list. How can Lauren appreciate the beauty of living life, if she is bound to lose the only person she has now? Supporting Cast: Angeli Nicole Sanoy, Chanda Romero, Yayo Aguila, Toby Alejar, Adrian Alandy, Erika Padilla, Mona Louise Rey
| 16 | "Pag-Uwi" | Alden Richards, Paolo Ballesteros, Chanda Romero | Marlon Rivera | Phil Noble | April 4, 2015 |
Brotherhood has never been smooth for Sam (Alden Richards) and Onyok (Paolo Ballesteros) as they have always disdained each other. In the turn of events, Sam was told that their mother was hospitalized. He had no choice but to bring his brother back home. But in a more trying twist of fate, Sam discovers that Onyok has taken a different path that is even harder to accept - to become a woman and change his name to Sophia. How will Sam and Sophia come to terms with their seemingly irreconcilable differences as siblings? Supporting Cast: Roi Vinzon, Chynna Ortaleza, Francine Garcia, Jervi Li
| 17 | "Pagsubok" | Jennylyn Mercado, Tom Rodriguez | Michael Tuviera | Don Santella | March 26, 2016 |
What started as the bride's accidental dropping of a wine glass cast a dark shadow upon the seemingly perfect couple Jean (Jennylyn Mercado) and Martin (Tom Rodriguez). Jean is diagnosed with a medical condition known as Amyotrophic Lateral Sclerosis (ALS) which has become too aggressive for her to deal with alone. She starts to conceal her physical difficulties by being hostile to the people who cares about her. How will Jean and Martin deal with a crippling disease that threatens not only to debilitate Jean, but eventually destroy her relationship with Martin? Supporting Cast: Juan Rodrigo, Shiela Marie Rodriguez, Chariz Solomon
| 18 | "Selda 1430" | Dingdong Dantes | Joyce Bernal | Ma. Acy Ramos | April 15, 2017 |
For a prisoner like Argel "Boy Pitik" Corpus (Dingdong Dantes), hoping is futile. He was a lookout in a bank robbery that ended up in a chilling loss of innocent lives. He has become aloof, and unlike the other detainees, he never had any visitor. Argel religiously dials 1430 and pretends to be talking to a person on the other line. In reality, it's just a dial tone. But one day, someone suddenly speaks on the other end of the line. How can one voice spark change and hope in the life of a convicted criminal? Supporting Cast: Eva Darren, Joe Gruta, Elijah Alejo, Chrome Cosio, Rodfil Obeso, Archie Adamos, Denise Barbacena
| 19 | "Elehiya" | Barbie Forteza, Taki Saito | Michael Tuviera | Michelle Ngu | March 31, 2018 |
Spirits are believed to roam around in limbo as they seek to close unfinished business, to finally walk into the light, to move on. But what if they're bound in this plane because it's the living that can't move on? A fake seer who has no love for anything and anyone but her sister gets a run for her money when she wakes up one day and sees ghosts for real. Seeking to close her 'eye', she and her sister help the spirits move on while learning to let go of her living ghosts too — her anger for their father, her grief with the loss of her mother, her lack of faith. Follow the story of the two sisters as they toe the line between the living and the dead, how they find redemption in love, and how they find God in the midst of pain. Supporting Cast: Lotlot de Leon, Allan Paule, Thea Tolentino, Jeric Gonzales, Lolie Mara, Archie Adamos
| 20 | "The Journey" | Alden Richards | Michael Tuviera | Renato Custodio Jr. | April 20, 2019 |
Supporting Cast: Max Collins, Rodjun Cruz, Kristoffer Martin, Jennica Garcia, Vaness del Moral, Nonie Buencamino, Irma Adlawan, Ricky Davao

== See also ==
- Eat Bulaga!
- TVJ Productions, Inc.
- Philippine noontime variety television shows
