= Jose Manalo =

Filipino comedian (born 1966)

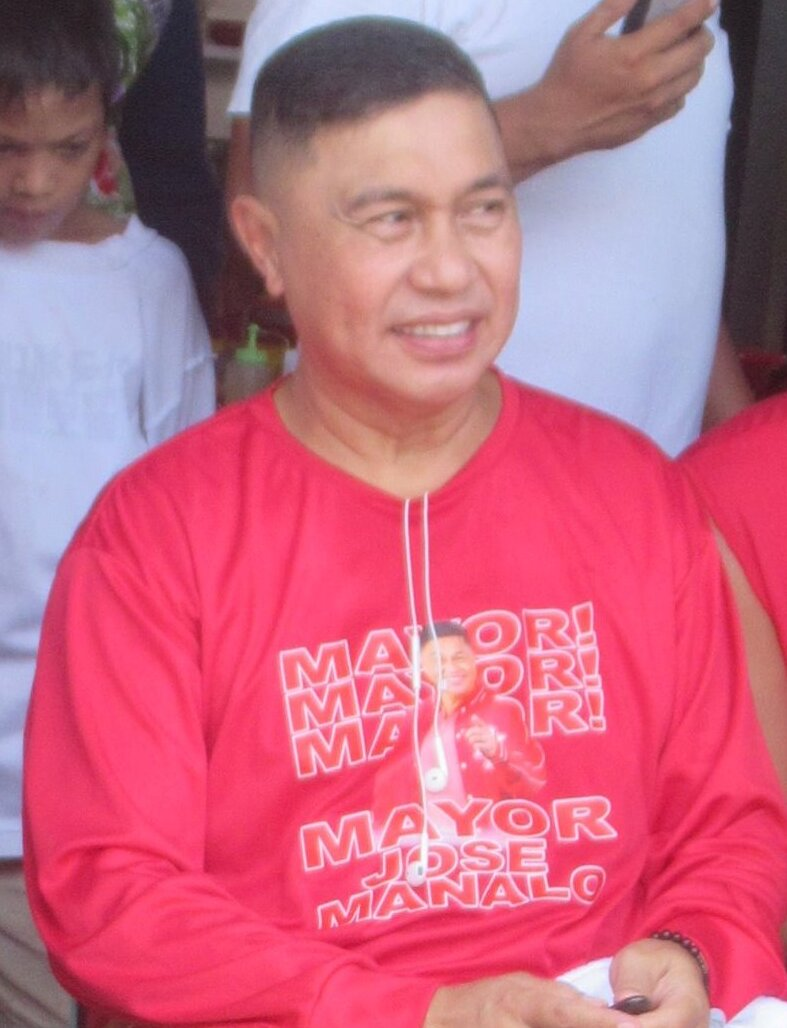
- Manalo in 2024
- Born: Ariel Pagtalonia Manalo; February 12, 1966 (age 60); Tondo, Manila, Philippines
- Television: ABS-CBN (1994–1995); GMA Network (1995–2024); TV5 Network (2010–2012, 2020-2021, 2023–present)
- Spouses: Anna Lyn Santos (died 2022); Gene Marranan (m. 2024)
- Children: 5, including Benj & Nicco

Comedy career
- Years active: 1990–present
- Medium: Stand-up; film; television
- Genres: Observational comedy; insult comedy; blue comedy
- Subjects: Everyday life; Filipino culture; human sexuality

Ariel Pagtalonia Manalo (born February 12, 1966), known professionally as Jose Manalo (Tagalog: [hoˈse mɐˈnɐlɔ]), is a Filipino comedian, actor, and director, best known as a host of the noontime variety show Eat Bulaga! (1996–present) on TV5. He is also recognized for his stand-up comedy performances.

== Early and personal life ==
Manalo married Anna Lyn Santos, his estranged wife, who died at age 54 in January 2022. She is survived by their children: Myki, a medical doctor; Benj Manalo, married to Lovely Abella; Sherwin Nicco, an actor; Ai, an accounts manager; and Colyn, a musician.

On December 2, 2024, Manalo became engaged to EB Babe dancer Gene Maranan. They married on December 17.

== Career ==
At 18, Manalo left school to support his growing family. Without a college degree, he took various odd jobs, including working as an errand boy, pedicab driver, and street vendor. He began his comedic career as a member of the Boyoyong clown trio (1988–1988). In 1992, he entered the entertainment industry as part of the cast of the afternoon drama series Valiente. He also served as a substitute performer on the youth-oriented variety show That's Entertainment when dancers were unavailable. His breakthrough came when he joined Eat Bulaga! as a production assistant in 1996 and later became a host in 2002. He subsequently rose to prominence, starring in successful films and sitcoms alongside Vic Sotto.

In 2023, Manalo and fellow co-hosts of Eat Bulaga! departed TAPE, Inc. following a dispute with Tito Sotto, Vic Sotto, and Joey de Leon. Collectively known as the "Legit Dabarkads", they transferred to TV5, where they hosted a new program titled E.A.T., later renamed Eat Bulaga! on January 6, 2024.

== Controversy ==
In 2012, Jose Manalo's wife Annalyn lodged a complaint against the comedian for verbal and emotional abuse. In her affidavit, she claimed that the abuse started in 2011. Manalo denied the charges of abuse and also his wife's accusations of family abandonment and child neglect. In his official statement, Manalo asserted that he provided support, "financial or otherwise", to his children.

In late 2013, however, Manalo's daughter filed a case of violation against her father for failure to provide financial support, which caused her to drop out of school. The following year, his daughter subsequently attempted suicide, citing her family problems and mainly blaming her father as the reason. Manalo had also refuted these allegations by his daughter.

In 2022, the Court of Appeals absolved Manalo from civil liability arising from his wife Annalyn's P 50 million debt to businessman Froilan Clemente Jr. It nullified the compromise agreement since Manalo is not part thereof.

== Filmography ==
=== Television ===
Year	Title	Role
1994–1997	Valiente	Elias
1995	GMA Telesine Specials: Kung Saan Sisikat ang Araw	Tomas
1996–present	Eat Bulaga!	Himself (co-host)
2001–2007	Daddy Di Do Du	Val
2004	Love to Love: Haunted Lovehouse	—
2004	Magpakailanman: Bert Marcelo Story	Bert Marcelo
2005–2007	H3O: Ha Ha Ha Over	—
2006	Bahay Mo Ba 'To?	Chucky
2007–2009	Ful Haus	Juan Miguel "Onimeg" Palisoc
2009	SRO Cinemaserye: The Reunion	Ricky Tienes
2009	Wow Hayop!	Himself
2010	Panday Kids	Mambo
2010	May Darling Aswang	Gas
2010–2011	Laugh or Lose	Himself
2010	R U Kidding Me?	Himself
2011–2012	The Jose and Wally Show Starring Vic Sotto	Jose De Leoncio
2012, 2021	Pepito Manaloto: Ang Tunay na Kuwento	Mr. Camino
2012–2016	Celebrity Bluff	Himself
2013, 2014	Vampire ang Daddy Ko	Ding
2015	Sabado Badoo	Himself (guest)
2015–2016	Kalyeserye	Tinidora Zobeyala / Frankie Arinolli
2015–2019	Sunday PinaSaya	Himself (various roles)
2016–2017	Hay, Bahay!	Mael
2017–2018	Bossing & Ai	Himself (co-host)
2017–2018	The Lolas' Beautiful Show	Tinidora Zobeyala
2019	Starstruck Season 7	Himself (judge)
2020–2021	Fill in the Bank	Himself (host)
2021	Catch Me Out Philippines	Himself (host)
2023–2024	Open 24/7	Spark Fontanilla
2023–2024	Wow Mali Doble Tama	Himself (host)
2023	Battle of the Judges	Himself (judge)

==== Television film ====
Year	Title	Role
2014	Pangalawang Bukas: An Eat Bulaga Lenten Special	Alex
2015	Pinagpalang Ama: An Eat Bulaga Lenten Special	Jessie
2016	Kaputol ng Buhay: An Eat Bulaga Lenten Special	Lola Tinidora
2016	God Gave Me You: An Eat Bulaga Lenten Special	Capt. Frank
2017	Mansyon: An Eat Bulaga Lenten Special	Moris
2018	Pamana	Kap. Joselito Nunal
2019	Ikigai	Danilo

=== Film ===
Year	Title	Role
1997	Daniel Eskultor: Hindi umaatras sa laban	—
2003	Lastikman	Jose
2004	Enteng Kabisote: Okay ka, Fairy ko: The Legend	Jose
2005	Ispiritista: Itay, May Moomoo!	George
2005	Enteng Kabisote 2: Okay ka, Fairy ko: The Legend Continues	Jose
2006	Oh My Ghost	—
2006	Enteng Kabisote 3: Okay ka, Fairy ko: The Legend Goes On and On and On	Jose
2007	Enteng Kabisote 4: Okay ka, Fairy ko... The Beginning of the Legend	Jose
2007	Atang Family	—
2008	Dobol Trobol: Lets Get Redi 2 Rambol!	Nemo
2008	Scaregivers	Billy
2008	Iskul Bukol 20 Years After (Ungasis and Escaleras adventure)	Jude
2009	Love on Line	Totonio "Tot" Baklaba
2010	Si Agimat at si Enteng Kabisote	Jose
2011	Pak! Pak! My Dr. Kwak!	James
2011	Enteng ng Ina Mo	Jose
2012	Si Agimat, si Enteng, at si Ako	Jose
2012	D' Kilabots Pogi Brothers Weh?!	Justine Kilabot
2013	My Little Bossing	Parak
2014	My Big Bossing	Buboy
2015	My Bebe Love	Domeng
2016	Enteng Kabisote 10 and the Abangers	Lola Tinidora
2017	Trip Ubusan: The Lolas vs. Zombies	Lola Tinidora
2018	Jack Em Popoy: The Puliscredibles	Fernando "Nanding" Halimuyac
2019	Boy Tokwa: Lodi ng Gwapo	Rodrigo Morelos (aka Boy Tokwa)
2019	Mission Unstapabol: The Don Identity	Benjamin Fortun
2026	The Greatest Showdown	TBA

== Awards and recognitions ==
Year	Award-Giving Body	Category	Work	Result
2005	Metro Manila Film Festival	Best Supporting Actor	Enteng Kabisote 2: Okay Ka Fairy Ko... The Legend Continues	Won
2012	43rd Box Office Entertainment Awards	Bert Marcelo Lifetime Achievement Award (with Wally Bayola)	–	Won
2012	43rd Box Office Entertainment Awards	Most Popular Male Novelty Singer (with Wally Bayola)	Shembot & Jump Brothers songs	Won
2012	43rd Box Office Entertainment Awards	Certified Comedy Concert Artist	Jose & Wally: A Party for Every Juan	Won
2013	44th GMMSF Box-Office Entertainment Awards	Most Popular Novelty Singers (with Ryzza Mae Dizon & Wally Bayola)	Cha-Cha Dabarkads song	Won
2013	44th GMMSF Box-Office Entertainment Awards	Male Concert Performers of the Year (with Wally Bayola)	Jose & Wally Concert: A Party for Juan and All	Won
2014	Dabarkads Awards	Best Actor	Eat Bulaga! Lenten Special Presents: Pangalawang Bukas	Won
2014	28th PMPC Star Awards For TV	Best Single Performance by an Actor (tied with Arjo Artayde of MMK)	Eat Bulaga! Lenten Special Presents: Pangalawang Bukas	Won
2015	OFW Gawad Parangal	Outstanding Actor and Comedian	Eat Bulaga!	Won
2015	Eastwood City Walk of Fame	Walk of Fame Star Inductee	–	Inducted
2016	USTv Students' Choice Awards	Special Recognition for Social Media Phenomenon	Eat Bulaga!: Kalye Serye (with Wally Bayola and Paolo Ballesteros as Kalye's Angels)	Won
2016	Platinum Stallion Media Awards	Trinitian Awardee for Values-Oriented TV Character	Eat Bulaga!: Kalye Serye (with Wally Bayola and Paolo Ballesteros as Kalye's Angels)	Won
2016	47th GMMSF Box-Office Entertainment Awards	Bert Marcelo Lifetime Achievement Award (with Wally Bayola, and Paolo Ballesteros)	–	Won
2016	29th Aliw Awards	Best Stand-Up Comedian	Eat Bulaga!	Won
2016	30th PMPC Star Awards for Television	Best Comedy Actor	Hay, Bahay!	Won
2016	Inding-Indie Short Film Festival Awards	Pinakahuwarang Komedyante ng Taon	Eat Bulaga!	Won
