= Mitoy Yonting =

Filipino singer

- Born: Michael Yonting; January 5, 1970 (age 56); Calasiao, Pangasinan, Philippines
- Origin: Sampaloc, Manila, Philippines
- Genres: Pop, rock, OPM, Ballad
- Occupations: Singer, comedian, actor
- Instrument: Vocals
- Years active: 1996–present
- Labels: MCA Music; Star Magic (2013–present)

Michael Yonting (born January 5, 1970), more popularly known by his screen name Mitoy Yonting, is a Filipino singer, comedian, actor, and lead vocalist for The Draybers. Yonting rose to fame after winning the first season of The Voice of the Philippines in 2013.

== Background ==
Yonting was born on January 5, 1970, and is from Calasiao, Pangasinan. His interest in music started at age 13 when he would listen to the radio and make his own singing routines. In high school, he competed in several local singing competitions. In college, he studied criminology at the Philippine College of Criminology. During this time he joined a band, and eventually left college to focus on his singing career.

== Personal life ==
Yonting married Merlita Runas in 1996.

== Career ==
=== Beginnings ===
Yonting was discovered after competing in the 1990s televised singing competition Ikaw at Echo, a segment of the noontime variety show Eat Bulaga! on GMA Network where he competed as a voice-a-like of Air Supply's Russell Hitchcock. Though he did not win the title, his performance was well regarded. In 1996, he and his brother, Mylo Yonting, formed a band called "The Draybers" and joined Rockstar: Bakit? a sing-alike television show.

Through his television appearances, Yonting pursued a career as a comedian in the GMA Network sitcom Ful Haus, and the comedy sketch show H3O: Ha Ha Ha Over aired on QTV (now GMA News TV). Yonting later became a regular host on Eat Bulaga! for a brief time, before deciding to reunite with The Drayber's.

The Drayber's toured several countries including Japan, where Yonting met his wife, In late 2011, the band returned to Manila and performed at Resorts World Manila.

=== The Voice of the Philippines ===
In 2013, Yonting was invited to participate in the first season of The Voice of the Philippines. During the blind auditions, he sang "Bakit Ako Mahihiya" of Didith Reyes. His audition piece made Bamboo Mañalac and Lea Salonga, who got excited after hearing his voice, turn their chairs for him. After he finished his audition piece, Salonga requested that he sing a non-English song, and he responded by singing a Japanese song. Yonting then picked Salonga as his coach. During the Battles, he was paired with Chien Berbana and performed "Alone" by the American rock band Heart, a performance which was widely commended by both the judges and the show's followers. At the end of the round, Salonga picked Yonting citing his experience and prowess.

During the Live shows, Yonting continued to do well in the competition. During his first appearance in the Live Shows, he performed "Don't Stop Me Now" by the English rock band Queen. During that particular episode, he was saved after garnering 82.29% of the public's vote. During the third Live show, Yonting performed Dulce's "Paano" against Darryl Shy who sang Asin's Balita. Yonting lost to Shy for the public's vote but won after he got the highest points of the accumulated coach's and public's scores. On the first night of the semi-finals, he was paired up against Radha where both performed "Against All Odds" by Phil Collins as a Battle song. On the second night, he performed "The Power of Love" by Jennifer Rush. At the end of the show, Yonting was proclaimed as the Salonga's representative to the Finals. After the results, he performed his original song, "Bulag."

During the first night of the finals, he performed Freddie Aguilar's "Anak" and his original song "Bulag." On the second night of the finals, Yonting made a trio performance with Salonga and Vice Ganda where they performed "Total Eclipse of the Heart" by Bonnie Tyler. After the end of the round of votes, Yonting along with Sarah Geronimo's Klarisse de Guzman made it to the top two. In his last performance, he sang The Beatles' "Help!". At the end of the voting, Yonting received 57.65% of the votes proclaiming him the winner of the reality competition. With his title, he also won two million pesos, a brand-new car, and a four-year contract with MCA Music.

==== Performances ====
– Studio version of performance reached the top 10 on iTunes

Stage	Song	Original artist	Date	Order	Result
Blind Audition	"Bakit Ako Mahihiya?"	Jessa Zaragoza	June 29, 2013	5.7	Lea Salonga and Bamboo Mañalac turned (Joined Team Lea)
Battle Rounds	"Alone" (vs. Chien Berbana)	Heart	July 28, 2013	14.4	Saved by Lea
Live Top 24	"Don't Stop Me Now"	Queen	September 1, 2013	24.12	Saved by Public Vote
Live Top 16	"Paano"	Dulce	September 8, 2013	26.4	Saved by Lea (104.11 points)
Live Top 8	"Against All Odds" (vs. Radha)	Phil Collins	September 21, 2013	29.3	Safe
Live (Semifinals)	"The Power of Love"	Jennifer Rush	September 22, 2013	30.1	Safe
Live (Finals)	"Anak"	Freddie Aguilar	September 28, 2013	31.2	Winner
Live (Finals)	"Bulag" (original song)	Mitoy Yonting	September 28, 2013	31.7	Winner
Live (Finals)	"Total Eclipse of the Heart" (with Lea Salonga and Vice Ganda)	Bonnie Tyler	September 29, 2013	32.4	Winner
Live (Finals)	"Help!"	The Beatles	September 29, 2013	32.6	Winner

=== Post The Voice of the Philippines ===
After winning The Voice of the Philippines, Yonting became part of the Philippine Ballet Theatre's two-night concert called Sayaw at Serye on November 15 and 16, 2013. Yonting was one of the cast of Home Sweetie Home, ABS-CBN's newest sitcom, which premiered in January 2014. He was also a supporting act for Lea Salonga's concert series titled 'Playlist', which ran from December 2013 to January 2014. Yonting and Salonga performed a medley together during the concert.

== Acting ==
From 2018 to 2020, Mitoy was in the sitcom "Home Sweetie Home". In 2021, Mitoy was cast as a guest member in his first drama, the long-running action drama series "FPJ's Ang Probinsyano". In 2022, Mitoy returned in his second action drama series, "The Iron Heart", with former child star and "Ang Probinsyano" villain Richard Gutierrez, also featuring Sue Ramirez, Albert Martinez, and others.

== Discography ==
=== Albums ===
- The Voice of the Philippines – The Final 16 (MCA Music, 2013)
- The Voice of the Philippines – The Final 4 (MCA Music, 2013)
- The Voice of the Philippines: The Complete Season 1 Collection (MCA Music, 2013)
- Hanggang Wakas (Until Forever) (2014)

=== Singles ===
- "Bulag" (2013)
- "Pinaikot-Ikot" (2014)

== Filmography ==
=== Film ===
Year	Title	Role
2009	Love on Line (LOL)	Jonathan / Driver
2011	Pak! Pak! My Dr. Kwak!	Security Guard
2017	Our Mighty Yaya	Oscar "Oca" Redoble
2021	Momshies! Ang Soul Mo'y Akin!	Luke

=== Television series ===
Year	Title	Role
2006–2007	Lagot Ka, Isusumbong Kita	Jose
2007–2009	Ful Haus	Buboy
2014–2019	Home Sweetie Home	L.A.
2021	FPJ's Ang Probinsyano	Teban
2022–2023	The Iron Heart	Diony "Bungo" Zamora
2025	Incognito	Bokyo
2025	Baker’s Heart	Mang Jun

=== Television shows ===
Year	Title	Role
2005	H30: Ha Ha Ha Over	Co-host
2007	Eat Bulaga!	Himself/Performer
2013	The Voice of the Philippines	Contestant/Grand Winner
2013, 2014	The Singing Bee	Contestant (Note: with Jovit Baldivino in December 2013 & August 2014 (with Jason Dy), 3-day defending champion in December 2014)
2016–present	It's Showtime	Judge in Tawag ng Tanghalan
2021	Popinoy	Guest Judge
2025	Sing Galing!	Judge

== Concert tours ==
Supporting act

- Playlist: A Celebration of 35 Years (2013–2014) (supporting Lea Salonga)

== Awards and recognitions ==
- Best Male Performer in Hotels, Music Lounges, Bars (26th Aliw Awards, 2013)

Preceded by First	The Voice of the Philippines; Winner; 2013	Succeeded by Lyca Gairanod
Preceded by First	The Voice of the Philippines Regular; Winner; 2013	Succeeded by Jason Dy
