= The Jose and Wally Show Starring Vic Sotto =

- Genre: Comedy
- Written by: Jojo T. Nones
- Directed by: Bert de Leon
- Starring: Jose Manalo; Wally Bayola; Vic Sotto
- Country of origin: Philippines
- Original language: Filipino
- No. of episodes: 45

Production
- Executive producer: Aila R. de Jesus
- Producer: Vic Sotto
- Running time: 60 minutes
- Production companies: M-Zet TV Productions; TV5; TVJ Productions

Original release
- Network: TV5
- Release: November 5, 2011 – September 8, 2012

The Jose and Wally Show Starring Vic Sotto is a Philippine television comedy show broadcast by TV5. Directed by Bert de Leon, it stars Jose Manalo, Wally Bayola and Vic Sotto. It aired from November 5, 2011 to September 8, 2012, replacing R.U. Kidding Me and was replaced by Saturday Blockbusters.

== Synopsis ==
The Jose and Wally Show Starring Vic Sotto is a show-within-a-show. The plot revolves around two has-been comedians/TV hosts Jose de Leoncio (Manalo) and Wally Revilla (Bayola) whose last remaining shows are being axed by their respective home studios for faring poorly in ratings and their skits are only repetitive. Playing savior to both is Direk Vic (Sotto) an excellent TV director, forced to unify rivals Revilla and Leoncio in a show despite their bickering. He ends up producing a show featuring the two "frenemies" (friends and enemies) on a newly opened TV station. In the upper echelon is an executive (Boboy Garrovillo) who oversees everything and has a huge amount of money to spend and gamble. His former beauty queen-wife Maxene (Miriam Quiambao) will meddle in the operations and help her starlet niece, Tennessee or Tenten (Dianne Medina) in advancing the latter's acting career. On and off stage, Jose and Wally will try to upstage each other and prove who is the better comedian-host between them. They shoots a show titled "Tawa O Talo", a parody of their former show, "L.O.L: Laugh Or Lose". Despite rivalries, they remained professional.

== Cast and characters ==
=== Main cast ===
- Jose Manalo as Jose de Leoncio
- Wally Bayola as Wally Revilla
- Vic Sotto as Direk Vic/Direk Vic Sotto

=== Supporting cast ===
- Boboy Garrovillo as Boss Ramon
- Miriam Quiambao as Maxene
- Dianne Medina as Tennessee
- Niña Jose as Janna
- Erika Padilla as Erika
- Mcoy Fundales as Mcoy
- Jimmy Santos as Jimboy
- Roi Calilong as Roi
- Marnie Lapuz as Miss Ethel
- Cali Semana as Shirley

=== Other recurring characters ===
- CJ Mangahis as Carmel Revilla
- Keshia Dee as Lucy de Leoncio
- Angel Satsumi as Jinggam Bell / Cherry Revilla
- Macky Billones as Jigo de Leoncio
- Dennis dela Cruz as Sir Tony
- Rodjun Cruz as Clarence Cecilio
- Ana Abad Santos as Mrs. Tiu
- Victor Silayan as Kyle Esposo
- Arnell Ignacio as Trulala
- Arci Muñoz as Alexandra Vergara

== See also ==
- List of TV5 (Philippine TV network) original programming
