= Ploning =

- Theatrical Poster
- Directed by: Dante Nico Garcia
- Written by: Bj Lingan; Dante Nico Garcia
- Produced by: Ellen Criste; Judy Ann Santos; Jourdan Sebastian; Guia Gonzales
- Starring: Judy Ann Santos
- Narrated by: Tessie Tomas
- Cinematography: Charlie Peralta
- Edited by: Danny Añonuevo
- Music by: Jessie Lasaten
- Production company: Panoramanila Philippines Co.
- Distributed by: GMA Music through GMA Pictures
- Release date: April 30, 2008
- Country: Philippines
- Languages: Cuyonon; Filipino; Tagalog; Taiwanese

Ploning is a 2008 Philippine romantic family drama film directed by Dante Nico Garcia, who won Best Director at the 2008 Asian Festival of First Films. Based on a popular Cuyonon song of the same title about a girl's hidden feelings, the film stars Judy Ann Santos in the title role. Filming was done in the municipality of Cuyo in Palawan, Garcia's hometown. The film was the official entry of the Philippines for Best Foreign Language Film at the 81st Academy Awards.

== Plot ==
In the present, a mysterious Taiwanese fisherman, Muo Sei, lands in the town of Cuyo, Palawan beside the sea where he immediately looks for someone named "Ploning". In a flashback to some years ago, Ploning is known as a hardworking and thoughtful woman who, despite her age and beauty, decided not to marry. She had loved a man named Tomas fourteen years ago who left for a better life in Manila leaving her heartbroken and pining for his return. Despite this, Ploning continues her role as a dutiful daughter to the town patriarch Susing and to Tomas' grieving mother Intang, a compassionate friend to outsider Alma, and a caretaker of the invalid Juaning, whose son Digo she has taken under her care as well.

Ploning however, decides to leave their peaceful life to look for Tomas in Manila. Digo, overcome by grief, seeks help in the town guest, the nurse Celeste, whom they learn also had a lover named Tomas back in Manila. Due to her deep devotion, Ploning rejects the notion that this Tomas and her Tomas are the same person. On the day Ploning disappears, rain falls on Cuyo who has been suffering a dry season. Muo Sei is later revealed to be Digo, and the townspeople who are leading the town are the people Ploning helped back then.

== Cast ==
- Judy Ann Santos as Ploning
- Gina Pareño as Intang
- Mylene Dizon as Celeste
- Meryll Soriano as Alma
- Ces Quesada as Nieves
- Tony Mabesa as Susing
- Crispin Pineda as Toting
- Eugene Domingo as Juaning
- Tessie Tomas as Seling / Old Celeste
- Ketchup Eusebio as Badocdoc
- Ronnie Lazaro as Old Veling
- Joel Torre as Old Siloy
- Beth Tamayo as Divina
- Jojit Lorenzo as Basit
- Spanky Manikan as Tsuy
- Cedric Amit as Rodrigo
- Lucas Agustin as Siloy
- Ogoy Agustin as Veling
- Bojong Fernandez as Muo Sei

== Production ==
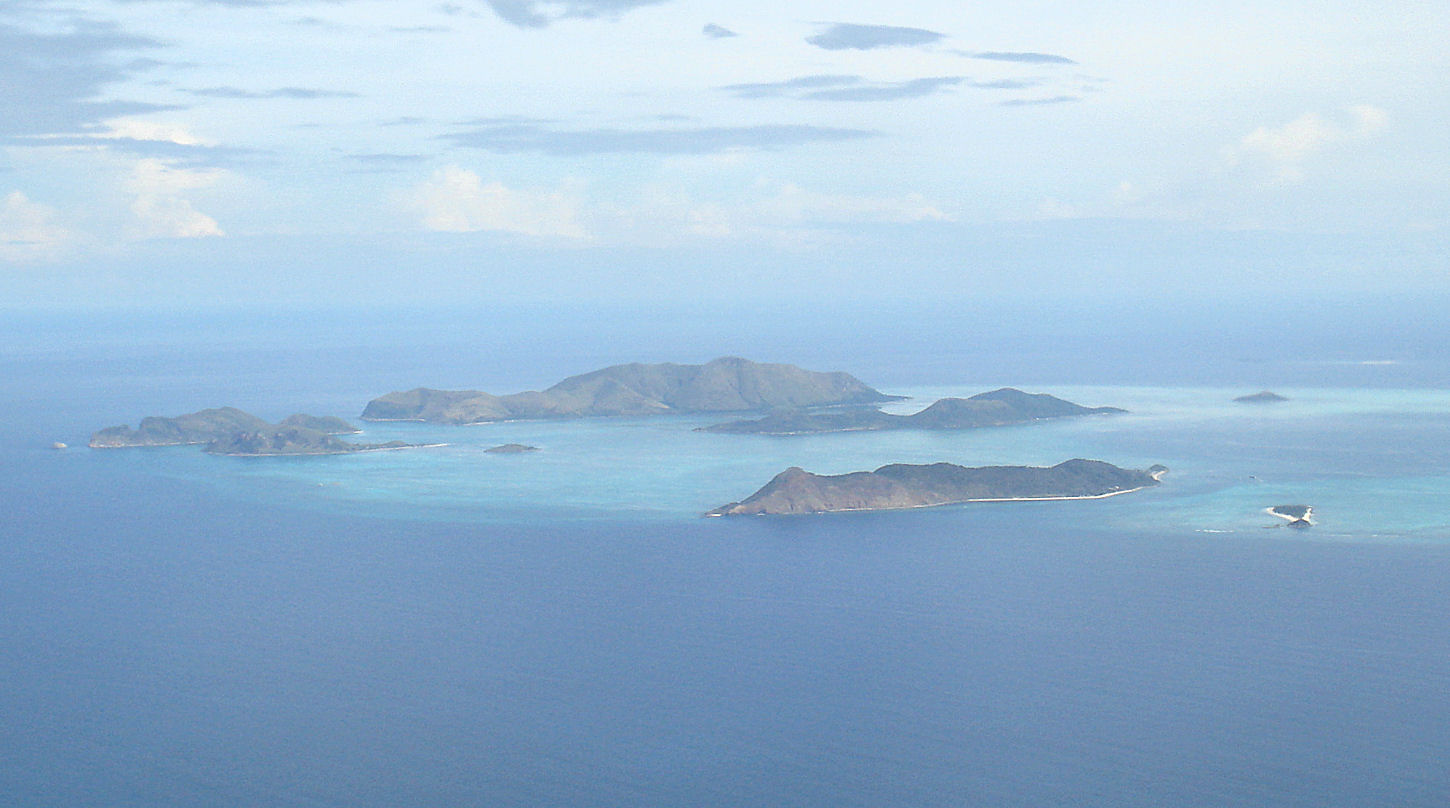
An aerial view of the Cuyo archipelago.

The filming of Ploning was entirely done on the municipality of Cuyo in Palawan. It was directed by Dante Nico Garcia, who incidentally, is a native of the town. According to him, the film is based on his childhood memories of the town. When he wrote the screenplay for the film with Benjamin Lingan, he decided to use his native tongue, Cuyonon. He had stated that the inspiration for the character Judy Ann Santos played in the film is based on a Cuyonon folk song about a girl's hidden feelings, originally sung by a male but was first recorded by a female. This led him to think of a story of a woman singing the song while remembering her lover.

Shooting of the film was done in various locales of the town. This includes the pier, the waiting place of Ploning; and Intigan beach. The basketball court, meanwhile, provided for a setting for the first meeting between Digo and Celeste, while Emilod was the location for the esposada (bridal shower), which took three nights to shoot. A cemetery was purposely built for the film and the locals decided to preserve it as a tourist attraction. The film was produced by Panoramamanila Pictures Co., which, despite its fledgeling status, tried its best to authenticate the production of the film. Cashew nut brittle, the town's delicacy, as well as the harvesting of salt in an asinan was showcased in the film. Cuyo's Pagdayao Festival, an Ati-atihan-like celebration usually celebrated on August 27, was also featured as the town fiesta.

=== Cast ===
The cast of Ploning is played by veteran actors as well as newcomers to show business. Veteran actress Judy Ann Santos got the title role. Compared to her other roles, which are very dramatic (particularly that of Mara in Mara Clara), her character in the film is seen as mellow and reserved. Numerous comediennes are also cast in the film, such as Gina Pareño (as Intang), Eugene Domingo (as Juaning), Ces Quesada (as Nieves), and Tessie Tomas (as Seling), whose dramatic performances seem weird in contrast to Santos'. The role of Celeste is supposed to have been given to Iza Calzado but Mylene Dizon took the role instead when scheduling conflicts between the film and Joaquin Bordado were not resolved. Other cast members include newcomers Lukas Agustin (as Siloy), Ogoy Agustin (as Veiling), Cedric Amit (as Digo), and Bodjong Fernandez (as Mou Sei) as well as established actors Ketchup Eusebio (as Badocdoc), Ronnie Lazaro (as Old Veiling), Jojit Lorenzo (as Basit), Tony Mabesa (as Susing), Spanky Manikan (as Tsuy), Crispin Piñeda (as Toting), Meryl Soriano (as Alma), Beth Tamayo (as Divina), and Joel Torre (as Mayor Siloy).

=== Inspiration ===
The inspiration for the film came from the folk song "Ploning". A fragment is shown below:

Cuyonon

Ploning, nga labing maleban
Ang guegma mo Ploning
Nga ing kandaduan
Lisensia ko Ploning
Kung sarang tugutan
Mapamasyar ako
Sa marayeng lugar

Filipino

Ploning, puro kabutihan
Ang irog mo Ploning
Na 'yong kandaduhan
Pasensya na Ploning
Kung iyong payagan
Mamamasyal ako
Sa malayong lugar

English

Ploning, full of goodness
Your love, Ploning
Which you have locked in
Pardon, Ploning
If you would allow
I'd like to take a stroll
In a faraway place

== Release ==
Ploning premiered in limited release from April 30 to May 6, 2008, with Filipino subtitles in the Philippines before going to wider release and subsequent worldwide screenings with English subtitles. The film was shown during the 6th Paris Cinema International Film Festival on July 5, 2008, as part of a showcase which featured Filipino films such as Himala and Kubrador. It was then seen in the Hong Kong Asian Independent Film Festival on November 16 and 21 and the 39th International Film Festival of India on November 28 and 30, 2008. Before 2008 ended, Ploning premiered at the Asian Festival of First Films in Singapore on December 9, where it received a Best Director award and a Best Screenplay/Script nomination.

In the United States, Ploning was shown during the 20th Palm Springs International Film Festival held in Palm Springs, California on January 12 and 13, 2009, with lead star Judy Ann Santos and director Dante Nico Garcia in attendance. It was part of the For Your Consideration program at the Christopher B. Smith Rafael Film Center in Rafael, California, where it was screened on January 18, 2009, with director Garcia in attendance. It was then seen at the 10th Newport Beach Film Festival in Newport Beach, California on April 26, 2009.

DVDs and VCDs of the film were released during the Christmas season by GMA Records and Home Video. These contain the film as well as bonus features such as the trailer and behind the scenes productions. There are Tagalog/Filipino subtitles but no English subtitles.

== Reception ==
The Cinema Evaluation Board (CEB) graded Ploning with an "A" evaluation, entitling it to a 100% tax rebate on its earnings. Meanwhile, the Movie and Television Review and Classification Board (MTRCB) gave it a "General Patronage" rating. After it was officially selected for the Academy Awards, it was reported that the Philippine government had given one million pesos (twenty thousand US dollars) in support of the film. Various celebrities were also noted to have supported the film. The film gained critical praise after Dante Nico Garcia won the Best Director award while he and Benjamin Lingan were nominated for the Best Screenplay award during the Asian Festival of First Film Awards in Singapore.

Judy Ann Santos, the film's star, was involved in a minor controversy when her home network, ABS-CBN, refused to promote Ploning and instead chose to promote the film When Love Begins. This led to disputes between her manager, Alfie Lorenzo, and the network though both parties have since reconciled. In August 2008, she returned to Cuyo to grace the screenings and was awarded as the town's "adopted daughter".

Ploning's road to the Oscars ended when the Top 9 shortlisted entries (later narrowed to the Final 5) for the Best Foreign Language Film category was announced but the team behind Ploning remained positive and appreciative of the experience. On January 18, 2009, ABS-CBN aired the primetime television special Pangarap ni Ploning (Dream of Ploning), which chronicled the fundraising events mounted to finance the lobbying efforts for the film's Oscar bid. Then, on February 22, 2009, lead star Judy Ann Santos and director Dante Nico Garcia launched the Ploning Foundation to help future filmmakers raise funds for the promotion of the chosen Philippine entry similar to what they did for Ploning.

== Awards and nominations ==
- Official Entry of the Philippines for Best Foreign Language Film of the 81st Academy Awards.
- Asian Festival of First Film Awards (Singapore)
  Best Director: Dante Nico Garcia — Win
  Best Screenplay/Script: Dante Nico Garcia & Benjamin Lingan — Nominees
- 7th Gawad Tanglaw
  Best Film — Win
  Best Director: Dante Nico Garcia — Win
  Best Actress: Judy Ann Santos — Win
  Best Screenplay: — Win
  Best Story: — Win
  Best Cinematography — Win
  Best Editing — Win
- 6th ENPRESS Golden Screen Awards
  Best Motion Picture—Drama
  Best Direction: Dante Nico Garcia
  Best Performance by an Actress in a Leading Role—Drama: Judy Ann Santos
  Best Performance by an Actress in a Supporting Role—Drama, Musical or Comedy: Mylene Dizon
  Breakthrough Performance by an Actor: Cedric Amit, Bojong Fernandez
  Best Original Screenplay: Dante Nico Garcia & Benjamin Lingan
  Best Cinematography: Charlie Peralta
  Best Editing: Danny Añonuevo — Win
  Best Production Design: Raymund George Fernandez
  Best Sound: Mike Idioma — Win
  Best Musical Score: Jessie Lasaten
- 11th Gawad Pasado Awards
  Pinakapasadong Pelikula (Best Film) — Win
  Pinakapasadong Direktor (Best Director): Dante Nico Garcia — Win
  Pinakapasadong Aktres (Best Actress): Judy Ann Santos — Win
  Pinakapasadong Katuwang na Aktres (Best Supporting Actress): Ces Quesada
  Pinakapasadong Katuwang na Aktres (Best Supporting Actress): Mylene Dizon
  Pinakapasadong Dulang Pampelikula (Best Screenplay): Dante Nico Garcia & Benjamin Lingan — Win
  Pinakapasadong Istorya (Best Story): Dante Nico Garcia
  Pinakapasadong Sinematograpiya (Best Cinematography): Charlie Peralta — Win
  Pinakapasadong Editing (Best Editing): Danny Anonuevo
  Pinakapasadong Musika (Best Musical Score): Jessie Lasaten
  Pinakapasadong Tunog (Best Sound): Albert Michael Idioma
  Pinakapasadong Pelikula sa Pag-gamit ng Wika — Win
- 25th PMPC Star Awards for Movies
  Movie of the Year
  Movie Director of the Year: Dante Nico Garcia
  New Movie Actor of the Year: Bojong Fernandez
  Original Movie Screenplay of the Year: Dante Nico Garcia & Benjamin Lingan
  Movie Cinematographer of the Year: Charlie S. Peralta
  Movie Editor of the Year: Danny Añonuevo
  Movie Production Designer of the Year: Raymund Jorge Fernandez
  Movie Musical Scorer of the Year: Jessie Lasaten — Win
  Movie Sound Engineer of the Year: Mike Idioma
- 32nd Gawad Urian Awards
  Best Actress: Judy Ann Santos
  Best Cinematography: Charlie S. Peralta
  Best Editing: Danny Añonuevo
  Best Production Design: Raymund Jorge Fernandez
  Best Music: Jessie Lasaten
  Best Sound: Mike Idioma
- 57th FAMAS Awards
  Best Picture
  Best Director: Dante Nico Garcia
  Best Actress: Judy Ann Santos
  Best Supporting Actor: Boyong Fernandez
  Best Supporting Actress: Gina Pareño
  Best Story: Dante Nico Garcia
  Best Screenplay: Dante Nico Garcia & Benjamin Lingan
  Best Cinematography: Charlie S. Peralta
  Best Art Direction: Raymond Fernandez
  Best Musical Score: Jesse Lasaten Win
  Best Sound: Albert Michael Idioma
  Best Editing: Danilo Añonuevo
  Best Visual Effects: Optima Digital Win
- 3rd Gawad GENIO Awards
  Best Film
  Best Film Director: Dante Nico Garcia
  Best Film Actress: Judy Ann Santos
  Best Film Cinematographer: Charlie S. Peralta
  Best Film Editor: Danilo Añonuevo
  Best Film Musical Scorer: Jesse Lasaten Win
  Best Film Screenwriter: Dante Nico Garcia & Benjamin Lingan
  Best Film Sound Engineer: Albert Michael Idioma
  Best Film Story: Dante Nico Garcia
  Best Film Visual Effects: Optima Digital
- 27th FAP Luna Awards (nominations only; needs updating)
  Best Picture
  Best Actress: Judy Ann Santos
  Best Screenplay: Dante Nico Garcia & Benjamin Lingan
  Best Cinematography: Charlie S. Peralta
  Best Production Design: Raymond George Fernandez
  Best Musical Scoring: Jesse Lasaten
  Best Sound: Albert Michael Idioma

== Soundtrack ==
The soundtrack used composes only of Cuyonon folk songs arranged and performed by the musical group SINIKA.

1. "Esmeralda"
2. "Pondo, Pondo"
3. "Konsomisyon"
4. "Ploning" (Song by: Pauline Kaye P. Gilongos)

== Media and distribution release ==
The series was released onto DVD-format and VCD-format by GMA Records. The DVD contained the movie the full-length trailer of the movie. The DVD/VCD was released in 2008.
