= My Darling Aswang =

- Genre: Sitcom, Horror
- Created by: Associated Broadcasting Company and M-Zet TV Productions
- Directed by: Bert de Leon
- Starring: Vic Sotto
- Country of origin: Philippines
- Original language: Tagalog
- No. of episodes: 58

Production
- Running time: 1 hour

Original release
- Network: TV5
- Release: April 4, 2010 – May 8, 2011

My Darling Aswang is a situational comedy broadcast by TV5. Directed by Bert de Leon, starring Vic Sotto. It aired from April 4, 2010 to May 8, 2011, replacing Shall We Dance? and was replaced by Who Wants to Be a Millionaire? in Talentadong Pinoy's timeslot. Inspired by the movie Ang Darling Kong Aswang.

== About ==
The sitcom My Darling Aswang is a spin-off from the MMFF 2009 box office movie Ang Darling Kong Aswang. It was Vic Sotto's second program with TV5 after Who Wants to be a Millionaire.

== Cast ==
- Vic Sotto as Victor
- Daiana Menezes as Bella
- Tetchie Agbayani as Tasha
- Miguel Faustmann as Demet
- Ces Quesada as Aling Idang
- Sugar Mercado as Sugar
- Jose Manalo as Gas
- Wally Bayola as Bal
- Richie D'Horsie as Mel
- Kakai Bautista as Queyni
- Rhea Nakpil as Dindin

== See also ==
- List of TV5 (Philippine TV network) original programming
