= Love on Line (LOL) =

- Directed by: Tony Y. Reyes
- Written by: Bibeth Orteza; Tony Y. Reyes
- Produced by: Orly R. Ilacad; Marvic C. Sotto; Antonio P. Tuviera
- Starring: Vic Sotto; Paula Taylor
- Cinematography: Lito 'Itok' Mempin
- Edited by: Danny Añonuevo
- Music by: Michael Alba
- Production companies: OctoArts Films; M-ZET Productions; APT Entertainment
- Distributed by: OctoArts Films
- Release date: August 19, 2009 (Philippines)
- Country: Philippines
- Language: Filipino
- Box office: ₱13.6 million

Love on Line (LOL) is a 2009 Filipino comedy film produced by OctoArts Films and M-Zet Productions, directed by Tony Y. Reyes.

== Plot ==
The story starts in a futuristic Manila, where 2 old men bicker against each other on their pasts. Samson (Vic Sotto) is Delilah's (Gina Pareño) son, while Tot (Jose Manalo) is a helper on the house that is a spoiled brat, much to Samson's anger. Back in time....

Tot usually sets him up on blind dates, with disastrous results, starting with a fat woman. He chains Tot and regularly threatens him with a hammer if he doesn't kiss the dog in front of him. Then when Delilah contracts a disease, which only Tot has the same blood type with her, Samson was forced again to go with the helper's scheme. He was set up again by Tot, using his face on the chat and online dating site. Angry, Samson chains Tot once again, forcing the latter to act like a dog.

Bunny (Manilyn Reynes), a regular in the dating site, uses her Thai cousin Paula's (Paula Taylor) picture to get known, which the latter consented. When the time for the eyeball, the real ones shocked when their proxies met, leading for Tot and Bunny to be jealous on their respective proxies and Tot to cast a curse that Delilah told him about, switching their personalities in 3 hours cycle, without cure to dispel the curse. Cursed, Tot got Samson's body, doing debauchery while in Samson's body, while Samson, trapped in Tot's body could do nothing but curse him.

Until one day, Samson tried to explain what happened, when Tot kisses her (using Samson's body), much to the former's anger and the girl walks out in sadness and anger. Tot is once again chained in the water tank, only released when he promised that he will tell the truth. They told the truth about the curse and they are reconciled, only for the curse to activate again. Don Pedro returns the land title he bought from Delilah's husband, whom he hated so much, proving his love for Delilah outbalances his hatred for Delilah's husband.

Back in the present, Tot and Samson swapped bodies again, the latter chasing the former out with a crutch as a weapon.

== Cast ==
- Vic Sotto as Samson Alumpihit, Jr.
- Paula Taylor as Paula Taylor
- Gina Pareño as Delilah Alumpihit
- Manilyn Reynes as Roberta "Bunny" Polistico
- Leo Martinez as Don Pedro Polistico
- Jose Manalo as Totonio "Tot" Baklaba
- Matt Evans as Danie
- Melissa Ricks as Lizzie Alumpihit
- Wally Bayola as Bok
- Richie D'Horsie as Oxo/XO
- Danielle Castaño as Cleo
- Led Sobrepeña III as Butler
- Mitoy Yonting as Driver
- Ricky Davao as Attorney
- Petite as Red Gross (Red Rose)

== Soundtrack ==
The film used the song Believe In Me by Thor as its Original Soundtrack.
