= H3O: Ha Ha Ha Over =

Philippine television sketch comedy show

- Genre: Sketch comedy
- Presented by: Wally Bayola; Jose Manalo
- Country of origin: Philippines
- Original language: Tagalog
- No. of episodes: 88

Production
- Executive producer: Antonio P. Tuviera
- Camera setup: Multiple-camera setup
- Running time: 60 minutes
- Production companies: APT Entertainment; GMA Entertainment TV

Original release
- Network: QTV/Q
- Release: December 5, 2005 – August 6, 2007

H3O: Ha Ha Ha Over! is a Philippine television sketch comedy show broadcast by QTV. Hosted by Jose Manalo and Wally Bayola, it premiered on December 5, 2005. The show concluded on August 6, 2007, with a total of 88 episodes.

== Hosts ==
- Jose Manalo
- Wally Bayola

Co-hosts

- Sugar Mercado
- Gladys Guevarra
- The Papa Bears
  - Michael 'Mitoy' Yonting
  - Dax Martin
  - Duane Lao
  - RJ Cruz
