= Hay, Bahay! =

Philippine television sitcom series

- Title card
- Genre: Sitcom
- Written by: Bibeth Orteza
- Directed by: Bibeth Orteza
- Starring: Vic Sotto; Ai-Ai de las Alas; Oyo Boy Sotto; Kristine Hermosa; Wally Bayola; Jose Manalo
- Opening theme: "Hay, Bahay!" by Vic Sotto
- Country of origin: Philippines
- Original language: Tagalog
- No. of episodes: 61

Production
- Executive producer: Aila R. de Jesus
- Producer: Vic Sotto
- Camera setup: Multiple-camera setup
- Running time: 45 minutes
- Production companies: GMA Entertainment TV; M-Zet Productions

Original release
- Network: GMA Network
- Release: June 19, 2016 – August 27, 2017

Hay, Bahay! (transl. oh, house!) is a Philippine television sitcom series broadcast by GMA Network. Directed by Bibeth Orteza, it stars Vic Sotto, Ai-Ai de las Alas, Oyo Boy Sotto, Jose Manalo, Wally Bayola and Kristine Hermosa. It premiered on June 19, 2016, on the network's Sunday Grande sa Gabi line up. The series concluded on August 27, 2017, with a total of 61 episodes.

== Cast and characters ==
Cast

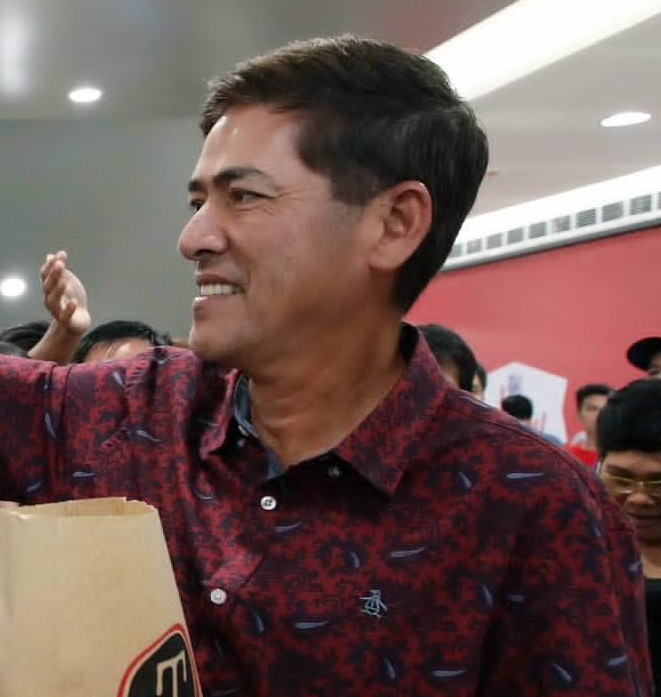
Vic Sotto

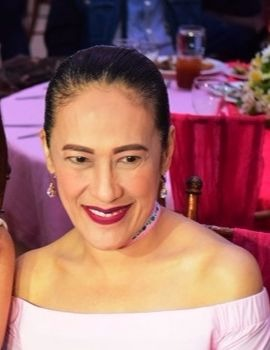
Ai-Ai de las Alas

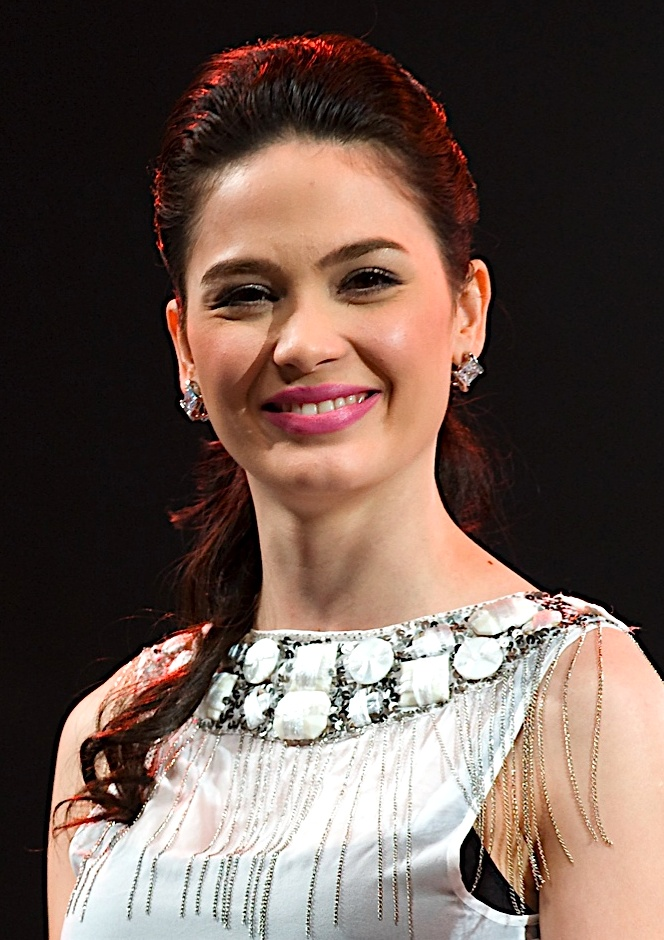
Kristine Hermosa

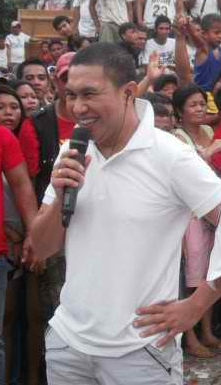
Jose Manalo

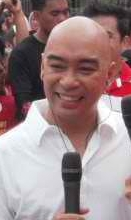
Wally Bayola

Main cast

- Vic Sotto as Edilberto "Vio" Vargas
- Ai-Ai de las Alas as Lavinia "Lav" Rodrigo-Vargas
- Kristine Hermosa as Batch / Mrs. Y
- Oyo Boy Sotto as Yoyo / Mr. Y
- Jose Manalo as Mael
- Wally Bayola as Sikat Rodrigo

Recurring cast

- Marlann Flores as Bolina
- Jelson Bay as Clooney / Remy
- Ruby Rodriguez as Nenuca / Nidora
- Pilita Corrales as Amelia

== Ratings ==
According to AGB Nielsen Philippines' Mega Manila household television ratings, the pilot episode of Hay, Bahay! earned a 17% rating. The final episode scored an 8.8% rating in Nationwide Urban Television Audience Measurement People in television homes.

== Accolades ==
Accolades received by Hay, Bahay!
Year	Award	Category	Recipient	Result	Ref.
2016	30th PMPC Star Awards for Television	Best Comedy Program	Hay, Bahay!	Nominated	
2016	30th PMPC Star Awards for Television	Best Comedy Actor	Jose Manalo	Won	
2016	30th PMPC Star Awards for Television	Best Comedy Actor	Wally Bayola	Nominated	
2016	30th PMPC Star Awards for Television	Best Comedy Actress	Ai-Ai delas Alas	Nominated	
2017	31st PMPC Star Awards for Television	Best Comedy Program	Hay, Bahay!	Nominated	
2017	31st PMPC Star Awards for Television	Best Comedy Actor	Jose Manalo	Nominated	
2017	31st PMPC Star Awards for Television	Best Comedy Actor	Wally Bayola	Nominated	
2017	31st PMPC Star Awards for Television	Best Comedy Actor	Vic Sotto	Nominated	
2017	31st PMPC Star Awards for Television	Best Comedy Actress	Ai-Ai delas Alas	Won	
