= Pak! Pak! My Dr. Kwak! =

- Theatrical movie poster
- Directed by: Tony Y. Reyes
- Screenplay by: Sherwin Buenvenida; Baroy Morga; Johnny Delos Santos; Lawrence Nicodemus
- Story by: Lawrence Nicodemus; Eureka Tumangday
- Produced by: Charo Santos-Concio; Malou Santos; Antonio P. Tuviera; Marvic Sotto; Orlando R. Ilacad
- Starring: Vic Sotto; Bea Alonzo; Zaijian Jaranilla; Xyriel Manabat
- Cinematography: Lito 'Itok' Mempin
- Edited by: Charliebebs Gohetia; Julo Quinto
- Music by: Jessie Q. Lasaten
- Production companies: ABS-CBN Film Productions, Inc.; M-Zet Productions; APT Entertainment; OctoArts Films
- Distributed by: Star Cinema
- Release date: April 23, 2011
- Running time: 115 minutes
- Country: Philippines
- Language: Filipino
- Box office: ₱72.31 million

Pak! Pak! My Dr. Kwak! is a 2011 Filipino comedy drama film starring Vic Sotto and Bea Alonzo and produced by OctoArts Films, M-Zet Productions, and APT Entertainment and released by Star Cinema. It is Vic Sotto's comeback to Star Cinema after 14 years.

== Synopsis ==
Angelo dreams of creating a medicine that could cure his father's illness. With some knowledge about medicinal herbs, he makes a living as a faith healer. Everyone believes him, except Cielo Delos Santos, a doctor who swears to do everything to uncover Angelo's secret.

Things get a little complicated when Angelito (Zaijian Jaranilla), an exiled angel comes down to earth to help Angelo become a better man. As the three of them try to achieve their own goals, they realize that they need each other more than they are willing to admit.

== Cast ==
=== Main Cast ===
- Vic Sotto as Angelo The Great Pak Healer/Ka Olegna
- Bea Alonzo as Dra. Cielo Delos Santos
- Zaijian Jaranilla as Saint Angelito
- Xyriel Manabat as Maisie
- Pokwang as Pining
- Wally Bayola as Phil
- Jose Manalo as James

=== Supporting cast ===
- Paolo Ballesteros as Anton
- Joonee Gamboa as Juan
- Dexter Doria as Ester delos Santos
- Victor Basa as Ricky
- Ryan Yllana as Paeng
- Jon Avila as Marcus
- Peque Gallaga as San Pedro
- Johnny Revilla as Dr. John Fuentes
- Bella Flores
- Thou Reyes as Dr. Reyes
- Paw Diaz as Dr. Diaz
- Charles Christianson as Dr. Charles
- Romeo Rivera as Don Ramon
- Ace Veloso as Ace
- Jackie Aquino as DSWD Officer

=== Special participation ===
- Anjo Yllana as Doctor Yllana
- Joey de Leon as Doctor Joey
- Toni Rose Gayda as Sister Mary

== Production ==
Toni Gonzaga was the original choice to play the role Dra. Cielo Delos Santos which will be the love interest of Vic Sotto's character. This should be the reunion of Gonzaga and Sotto after being co-host in Eat Bulaga! back in 2002. However, due to Toni's conflicting schedule because of other showbiz commitments, Bea Alonzo was tapped to replace Toni Gonzaga in the movie.

At the film's Take One Presents in preparation for its release, an interview of the film's casts are shown, behind the scenes or production during taping, and scenes not shown on the film itself to provide complete storyline, similar to an extended and clean feed version of May Bukas Pa from 2012 to 2013.

== Reception ==
The film has been graded 'B' by the Cinema Evaluation Board of the Philippines. The film had a total gross of ₱72.31 million.

== See also ==
- List of films about angels
