= Jourdan Sebastian =

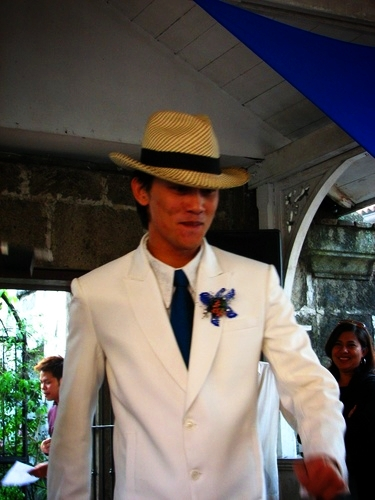

Background information
- Origin: Philippines
- Genres: Indie
- Years active: 1999 – Present

Jourdan Sebastian (a.k.a. The Dreamer), is an independent Filipino Spoken Word artist, director, executive producer, writer, actor, filmmaker, beat poet, acting coach, creative director, music video director and neo-Ilustrado movement proponent. He is also the author of The Dreamer's Manifesto.

== Albums ==
- Bigkas Pilipinas (2007)

== Films ==
- Scaregivers 2008
- Isnats 2005
- Ploning 2005 (as producer & cameo appearance)
