= Wally Bayola =

Filipino comedian (born 1972)

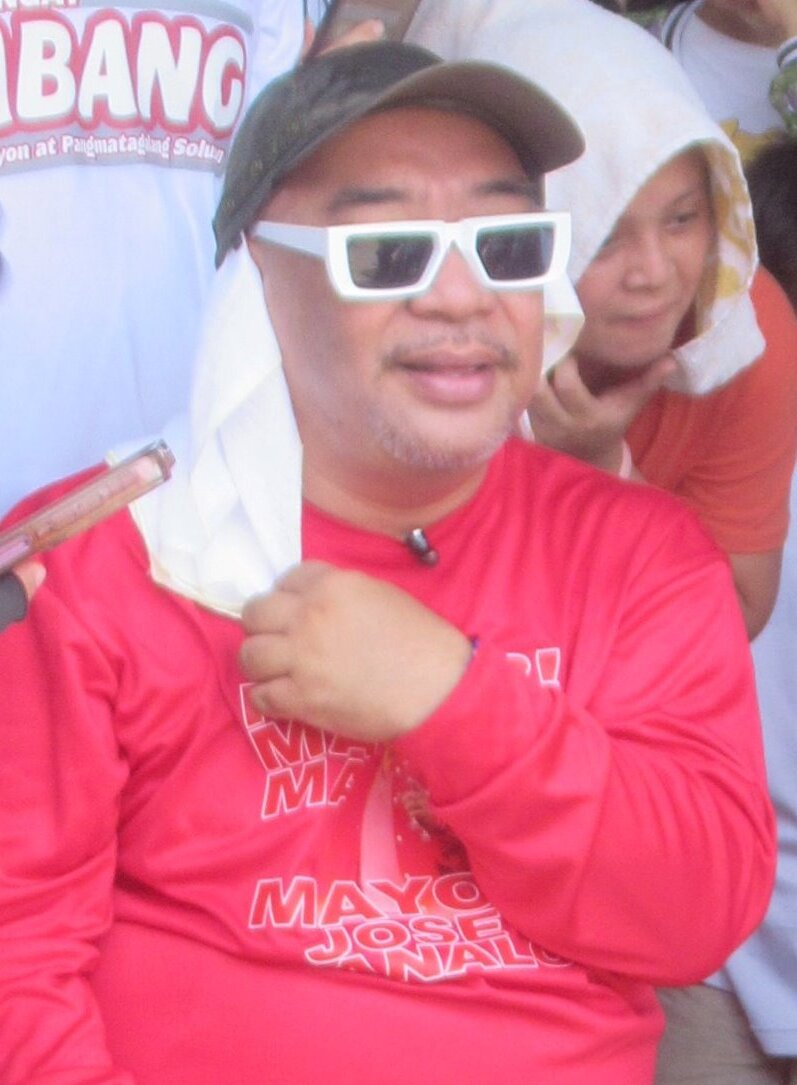
- Bayola in 2024
- Born: Walter James Bayola; May 3, 1972 (age 54); Naga, Camarines Sur, Philippines
- Occupations: Comedian; actor; television host
- Years active: 2000–present
- Known for: Kalyeserye; Co-host of Eat Bulaga!
- Television: GMA Network (2000–2023); TV5 Network (2010–2012, 2020-2021, 2023–present)
- Spouse: Riza Bayola
- Children: 7

Walter James "Wally" Bayola (born May 3, 1972) (Tagalog: [ˈwali bɐˈjolɐ]), a Filipino comedian, actor, and television host, best known for portraying Lola Nidora and other characters in the Kalyeserye segment of the noontime variety show Eat Bulaga!. He appears alongside co-hosts Jose Manalo and Paolo Ballesteros—collectively known as JoWaPao—in the Juan for All, All for Juan (now Sugod Bahay Mga Kapatid!) segment of the show.

== Early life and education ==
Bayola was raised by Francisco Nepomuceno, a priest and his maternal great-uncle, at a convent of a Catholic church in Naga, Camarines Sur. This arrangement came after his father left for the United States to work abroad and his mother was continuing her education. After Nepomuceno's death, he was taken under the care of his grandmother. He pursued his college education at Ateneo de Naga University and later transferred to Naga College Foundation, where he received a scholarship as a member of the theater club.

== Career ==
Bayola previously worked as a warehouse helper, a sing-along bar host, and a band member. He later performed at a comedy bar, where he was discovered by Eat Bulaga!. After a brief stint on the program, he returned to comedy bar performances until Andrew de Real invited him back as a regular host. He officially became a full-time host on May 3, 2000, which coincided with his birthday. He then formed a comedic duo with Jose Manalo.

They first headlined the sketch comedy show H3O: Ha Ha Ha Over from December 2005 to 2007, followed by The Jose and Wally Show Starring Vic Sotto from 2011 to 2012. He was temporarily absent from the program in 2013 following his involvement in a sex scandal. His role as Lola Nidora regained prominence during the rise of the "AlDub" love team of Alden Richards and Maine Mendoza in July 2015, which brought renewed attention to the character. He later co-hosted Sunday PinaSaya (2015–2019) with Jose Manalo, Ai-Ai delas Alas, and Marian Rivera. He also portrayed Sikat in the sitcom Hay, Bahay!.

On March 2, 2012, Bayola and Manalo had their first concert, Jose and Wally Show: A Party for Juan and All, at the Smart Araneta Coliseum. Their second concert was held at the same venue in 2013.

Bayola won the Best Supporting Actor award at the 2014 Dabarkads Awards.

== Controversies ==
=== Sex scandal ===
On September 2, 2013, a video showing Bayola and EB Babe Yosh Rivera engaging in sexual intercourse, was uploaded on YouTube. The video was immediately removed from the site but already went viral in several social media channels, including Facebook. After the scandal became known, it was reported that Bayola would not be appearing on Eat Bulaga! temporarily, as stated by his manager, Malou Choa Fagar who said the comedian "will lie low from the program". Rivera has not appeared on Eat Bulaga! since, and Bayola did not reappear until five months later on February 8, 2014, when he made an appearance on that day only during the Juan for All, All for Juan segment. Bayola has since returned full-time and is currently a host on Eat Bulaga!.

Bayola admitted on a Startalk interview that he attempted suicide with a gun at the time he realized the sex video had gone viral. A phone call from his colleague Jose Manalo brought him back to his senses and made him stop the attempt, and he was reminded to visit his daughter, who is battling leukemia, in the hospital.

=== Profanity incident ===
On August 10, 2023, Bayola and co-host, Jose Manalo were doing a skit on the show's Sugod Bahay, Mga Kapatid! segment, their scene was briefly interrupted when Manalo spoke to studio hosts Vic Sotto, Joey de Leon and Tito Sotto. Meanwhile, Bayola disappeared from the screen but accidentally uttered the Tagalog expletive "putang ina" off-screen that caught everyone's attention. The Movie and Television Review and Classification Board (MTRCB), motu proprio, issued a Notice to Appear and Testify to the production group of E.A.T.

A day later, on August 11, 2023, Bayola expressed regret and sincerely apologized for the incident and admitted that he had made a mistake.

== Personal life ==
He has been married to Riza Bayola since the age of 20, and they have five children. His first grandchild was christened in 2016.

In March 2026, Bayola sustained injuries from a motorcycle accident.

== Filmography ==
=== Film ===
Year	Title	Role
1997	Daniel Eskultor: Hindi Umaatras sa Laban	—
2003	Lastikman	Wally
2003	Fantastic Man	Prisoner
2003	Pakners	Katya
2004	Enteng Kabisote: Okay ka, Fairy Ko: The Legend	Armor Fairy
2005	Ispiritista: Itay, May Moomoo!	Wally
2005	Enteng Kabisote 2: Okay Ka Fairy Ko: The Legend Continues	—
2006	Oh My Ghost!	—
2006	Enteng Kabisote 3: Okay Ka, Fairy Ko: The Legend Goes On and On and On	—
2007	Enteng Kabisote 4: Okay Ka Fairy Ko...The Beginning of the Legend	—
2008	Dobol Trobol: Lets Get Redi 2 Rambol!	Bogart
2008	Scaregivers	Bob
2008	Iskul Bukol 20 Years After (Ungasis and Escaleras Adventure)	Sting
2009	Patient X	—
2009	Love on Line	Bok
2009	Ang Darling Kong Aswang	Gerry
2010	Si Agimat at si Enteng Kabisote	Bodyguard Bogart
2011	Pak! Pak! My Dr. Kwak!	Phil
2011	Enteng ng Ina Mo	Bodyguard Bogart
2012	Si Agimat, si Enteng Kabisote at si Ako	Bodyguard Bogart
2012	D' Kilabots Pogi Brothers Weh?!	Bruno Kilabot
2014	My Big Bossing's Adventure	Barangay Captain
2015	My Bebe Love	Lola Nidora
2016	Enteng Kabisote 10 and the Abangers	Nini / Lola Nidora
2018	Jack Em Popoy: The Puliscredibles	Joseph "Otep" Halimuyac
2019	Mission Unstapabol: The Don Identity	Bruno Hunyango

=== Television ===
Year	Title	Role
2000–present	Eat Bulaga!	Himself
2005	H3O: Ha Ha Ha Over	Himself
2005	I Laugh Sabado	Himself
2009	Cool Center	—
2009	SRO Cinemaserye Presents: Reunion	—
2009	Wow Hayop	Himself
2010	My Darling Aswang	Bal
2010	Laugh Or Lose	—
2010	Pepito Manaloto	Dodong
2011	R U Kidding Me?	—
2012	The Jose and Wally Show Starring Vic Sotto	Wally Revilla
2012–2013	Celebrity Bluff	Himself / Celebrity Gangnammm
2013	Magpakailanman: Behind The Laughter: The Wally Bayola Story	Himself
2013	Vampire ang Daddy Ko	Dong
2014	Hakbang ng Pangarap: Eat Bulaga Lenten Special	Galo
2015	Pinagpalang Ama: Eat Bulaga Lenten Special	Win-Win
2015	Sabado Badoo	Herself (cameo)
2015–2019	Sunday PinaSaya	Himself
2015	CelebriTV	Himself (guest)
2015	Starstruck	Coach Cynthia (guest judge)
2016	Kaputol ng Buhay: Eat Bulaga Lenten Special	Lola Nidora
2016	God Gave Me You: Eat Bulaga Lenten Special	Lance
2016–2017	Hay, Bahay!	Sikat / Romualdo Del Mar
2018	Pamana	Nanay Nunal
2018–2023	Daddy's Gurl	Marikit Otogan / Matilda
2020–2021	Bawal Na Game Show	Himself (host)
2021	Fill in the Bank	Himself (guest player)
2021–present	Balita One Nan	Himself (host)
2023–2024	Wow Mali Doble Tama	Himself (host)
2024	Selda ng Kahapon: Eat Bulaga! Lenten Special	Maximo
2025	Happy Pill: Eat Bulaga! Lenten Special	Dr. Vincent Cristobal

== Awards and nominations ==
Year	Award-Giving Body	Category	Work	Result
2012	43rd Box Office Entertainment Awards	Bert Marcelo Lifetime Achievement Award (with Jose Manalo)	—	Won
2012	43rd Box Office Entertainment Awards	Most Popular Male Novelty Singer (with Jose Manalo)	Shembot & Jump Brothers songs	Won
2012	43rd Box Office Entertainment Awards	Certified Comedy Concert Artist	Jose & Wally: A Party for Every Juan	Won
2013	44th GMMSF Box-Office Entertainment Awards	Most Popular Novelty Singers (with Ryzza Mae Dizon & Jose Manalo)	Cha-Cha Dabarkads song	Won
2013	44th GMMSF Box-Office Entertainment Awards	Male Concert Performers of the Year	Jose & Wally Concert: A Party for Juan and All	Won
2014	Dabarkads Awards	Best Supporting Actor	Eat Bulaga! Lenten Special Presents: Hakbang Ng Pangarap	Won
2015	1st Catholic Social Media Awards	Catholic Social Media Inspirational Award for promoting virtues, values, chivalry, modesty, morality and respect for elders (with Maine Mendoza, Alden Richards, TAPE Inc. & Eat Bulaga!)	Eat Bulaga!: Kalyeserye	Won
2015	28th Aliw Awards	Best Stand-Up Comedian	Eat Bulaga!	Nominated
2015	Illumine Awards	Most Innovative TV Comedian	Eat Bulaga!	Won
2015	OFW Gawad Parangal	Favorite Actor and Comedian	Eat Bulaga!	Won
2015	Eastwood City Walk of Fame	Walk of Fame Star Inductee	—	Inducted
2015	29th PMPC Star Awards for Television	Best Male TV Host	Eat Bulaga!	Nominated
2016	USTv Students' Choice Awards	Special Recognition for Social Media Phenomenon	Eat Bulaga!: Kalye Serye (with Jose Manalo and Paolo Ballesteros as Kalye's Angels)	Won
2016	Platinum Stallion Media Awards	Trinitian Awardee for Values-Oriented TV Character	Eat Bulaga!: Kalye Serye (with Jose Manalo and Paolo Ballesteros as Kalye's Angels)	Won
2016	47th GMMSF Box-Office Entertainment Awards	Bert Marcelo Lifetime Achievement Award (with Jose Manalo, and Paolo Ballesteros)	—	Won
2016	3rd PEP List Awards	Editors' Choice: Male Comedy Star of the Year	Eat Bulaga!	Won
2016	29th Aliw Awards	Best Stand-Up Comedian	Eat Bulaga!	Nominated
2016	30th PMPC Star Awards for Television	Best Comedy Actor	Hay, Bahay!	Nominated
