= Paolo Ballesteros =

Filipino actor, comedian and host (born 1982)

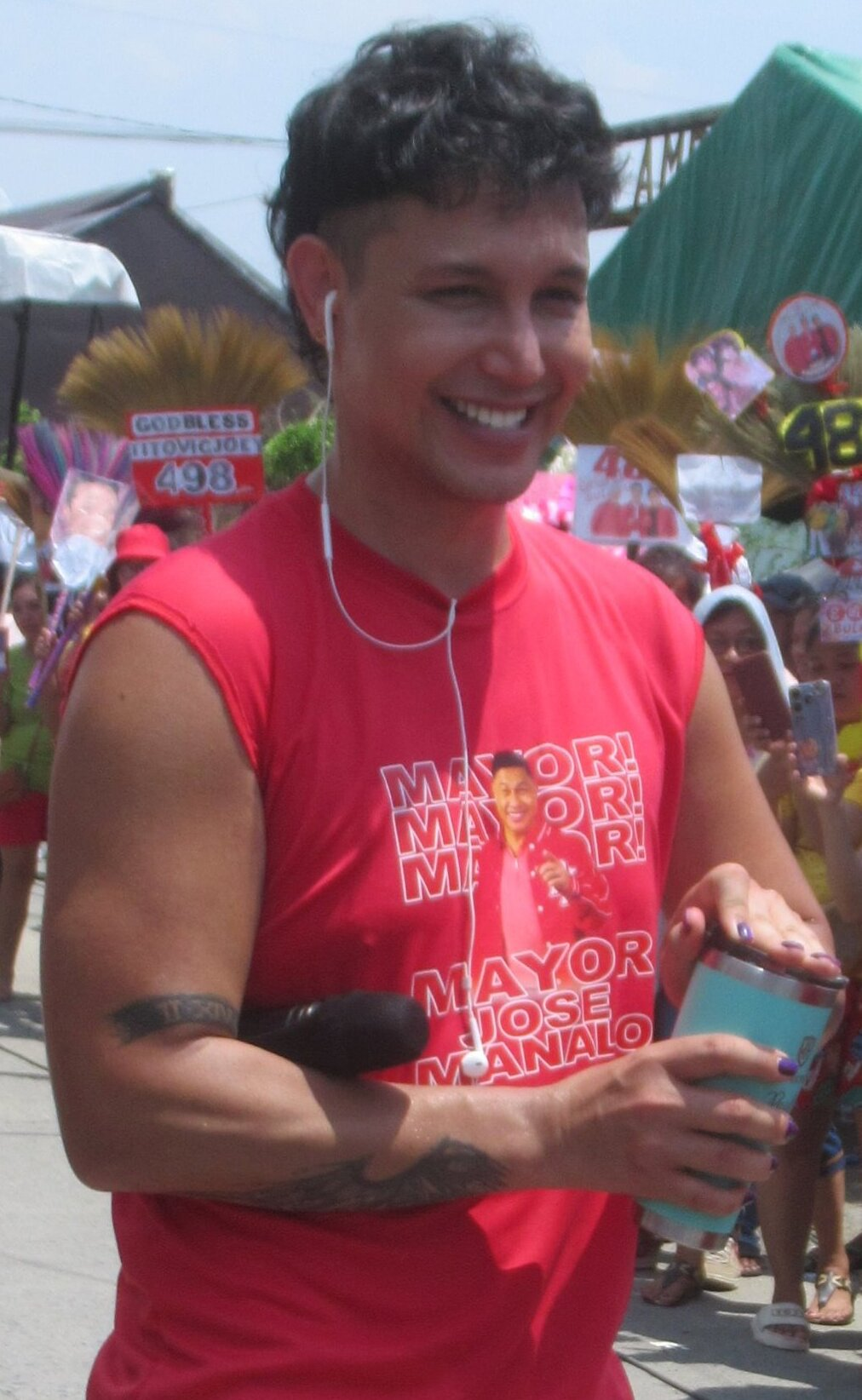
- Ballesteros in 2024
- Born: Paolo Elito Macapagal Ballesteros IV; November 29, 1982 (age 43); Cabanatuan, Nueva Ecija, Philippines
- Occupations: Actor, TV host, model, comedian, product endorser, drag queen
- Years active: 2001–present
- Television: GMA Network (2001–2023); TV5 Network (2010, 2013, 2020-2021, 2023–present)
- Children: 1
- Relatives: Eula Valdez (aunt); Fernando Amorsolo (great-grandfather); Sylvia Amorsolo-Lazo (grandaunt); Pablo Amorsolo (great-granduncle)

Paolo Elito Macapagal Ballesteros IV (born November 29, 1982) is a Filipino actor, comedian, and drag queen. He has appeared in films and several TV shows. He has been one of the co-hosts of the longtime noontime show Eat Bulaga! since 2001, and he is the host of Drag Race Philippines and Drag Race Philippines: Slaysian Royale.

== Early life ==
Paolo Elito Macapagal Ballesteros IV was born on November 29, 1982, in Cabanatuan, Nueva Ecija.

== Career ==
In March of 2016, Ballesteros was reportedly suspended from Eat Bulaga! for six months because of several rants that he posted on his Facebook account; in the post, he discussed his personal grievances with the live-show setup, organization, filming process, and catering services. During his six-month suspension period, Ballesteros took roles in Die Beautiful and Bakit Lahat ng Gwapo may Boyfriend?, and he returned to Eat Bulaga! on September 5, 2016. He received an award as best actor for his role in Die Beautiful at the 29th Annual Tokyo International Film Festival.

In 2022, he was chosen to be the host of Drag Race Philippines with recurring judges Jiggly Caliente and Kaladkaren Davila.

=== Impersonation and makeup transformation ===
Ballesteros is known for his various impersonations of female and male artists, and he has earned international acclaim for his makeup skills. He has posted pictures of his numerous makeup transformations through his Instagram account, transforming himself into Hollywood celebrities, as well as local artists.

For the 2016 Tokyo International Film Festival, he impersonated two female celebrities, the first being Angelina Jolie (calling himself Angelina Magdangal, a play on Filipina actress Jolina Magdangal) during the red carpet and opening ceremony, in an Emerald Modern Filipiniana Fishtail black velvet terno gown, with typical squared sleeves, black opera gloves, and black high heels. On the awards night and following press conference, he emulated Julia Roberts, wearing a gold sequin dress with white high heels and white opera gloves.

== Personal life ==
Ballesteros is related to Filipino painter Fernando Amorsolo, who is his great-grandfather, and fellow celebrity Eula Valdez, who is his aunt.

He was romantically involved with Katrina Nevada, with whom he has a daughter, Keira Claire.

In August 2019, Ballesteros confirmed that he is a gay man after years of speculation on his sexuality. Ballesteros, who has been known for his makeup transformation inspired from women celebrities, also remarked that he is a "lady," although he clarifies he does not present as feminine outside his profession.

== Filmography ==
=== Film ===
Year	Title	Role
2002	Pakisabi Na Lang... Mahal Ko Siya	Martin
2003	Anghel sa Lupa	Ariel
2004	Enteng Kabisote: Okay ka, Fairy Ko: The Legend	Fantastikman
2006	Metlogs (Metrosexual Jologs)	Rodelio "Rodel" Dapulo
2006	Enteng Kabisote 3: Okay ka, Fairy Ko: The Legend Goes on and on and on	Pao
2007	Xenoa	Zeus
2008	Xenoa 2: Clash of the Bloods	Zeus
2009	Kimmy Dora: Kambal sa Kiyeme	Waiter (cameo)
2010	Pendong	Paulino
2011	Pak! Pak! My Dr. Kwak!	Anton
2011	Enteng Ng Ina Mo	Gay Lover
2012	D' Kilabots Pogi Brothers Weh?!	Tweety
2013	My Little Bossings	Alat
2014	So It's You	L.A.
2015	My Bebe Love	Direk Raymond "Rich"
2016	Lumayo Ka Nga Sa Akin	Señorito Boglee Ginintuan
2016	Bakit Lahat ng Gwapo may Boyfriend?	Benj
2016	Die Beautiful	Trisha Echevarria / Patrick Villar
2016	Enteng Kabisote 10 and the Abangers	Lola Tidora
2017	Trip Ubusan: The Lolas vs. Zombies	Lola Tidora
2017	Barbi D' Wonder Beki	Billy Bayagan / Barbi D' Wonder Beki
2018	Amnesia Love	Kimmer
2018	My 2 Mommies	Manuel "Manu" Castillo
2018	Jack Em Popoy: The Puliscredibles	Robin "Binoy" Halimuyac
2019	Born Beautiful	Trisha Echevarria
2019	The Panti Sisters	Gabriel Panti

=== Television ===
Year	Title	Role
2001	Ikaw Lang ang Mamahalin	Paul
2001–present	Eat Bulaga!	Himself (co-host)
2002–03	Kahit Kailan	PJ
2005–06	Daddy Di Do Du	Paolo
2005	Love to Love	Eric
2006	Love to Love	Amando / Mandy
2007–08	Zaido: Pulis Pangkalawakan	Ida
2008	Dyesebel	Bukanding
2009	SRO Cinemaserye Presents: "Rowena Joy"	RJ
2009	Ang Babaeng Hinugot Sa Aking Tadyang	Alfie
2010	The Last Prince	Diwani Anexi
2010	Claudine	Carlo
2010	Midnight DJ	Venus
2010	Face to Face	Himself
2011	I Heart You, Pare!	Vodka
2011	Kung Aagawin Mo ang Langit	Aloha
2013	Kidlat	Walter / Warla
2013	The Ryzza Mae Show	Himself (guest)
2013	Vampire ang Daddy Ko	Andres Bonifacio
2014	Karugtong Ng Puso: An Eat Bulaga Lenten Drama Special	Reynaldo / Baldo
2014	Marian	Himself (co-host)
2015	Biro Ng Kapalaran: An Eat Bulaga Lenten Drama Special	Obet
2015	Sabado Badoo	Himself (cameo)
2016	Kaputol ng Buhay: An Eat Bulaga Lenten Drama Special	Lola Tidora
2018	Pamana	Paulito Nunal
2020	Bawal na Game Show	Himself (host)
2021	Fill in the Bank	Himself (guest player)
2021	Popinoy	Himself (host)
2022–	Drag Race Philippines	Himself (host)
2024	Selda ng Kahapon: An Eat Bulaga Lenten Drama Special	Ruby
2025	Drag Race Philippines: Slaysian Royale	Himself (host)

=== Radio ===
Year	Title	Role
2023	Wanted sa Radyo	Himself (guest)

== Awards ==
Awards
Year	Award giving body	Work/Nominee	Award	Result
2002	16th PMPC Star Awards for Television	Daddy Di Do Du	Best New Male TV Personality	Won
2015	Eastwood City Walk of Fame	Himself	Walk of Fame Star Inductee	Inducted
2016	USTv Students' Choice Awards	Eat Bulaga!: Kalyeserye (with Jose & Wally)	Special Recognition for Social Media Phenomenon	Won
2016	47th GMMSF Box Office Entertainment Awards	Himself with Jose & Wally	Bert Marcelo Lifetime Achievement Award	Won
2016	Platinum Stallion Media Awards	Eat Bulaga!: Kalyeserye	Trinitian Awardee for Values-Oriented TV Character	Won
2016	29th Tokyo International Film Festival	Die Beautiful	Best Actor	Won
2016	21st International Film Festival of Kerala	Die Beautiful	Special Jury Award for Outstanding Performance	Won
2016	42nd Metro Manila Film Festival	Die Beautiful	Best Actor	Won
2017	Film Development Council of the Philippines	Die Beautiful	Film Ambassador Award	Won
2017	Gawad A.N.A.K	Himself	Ang Natatanging Anak Kabanatuan	Won
2017	15th Gawad Tanglaw Awards	Die Beautiful	Best Actor	Won
2017	Guild of Educators, Mentors and Students	Die Beautiful	Best Actor	Won
2017	Gawad Bedista Awards	Die Beautiful	Actor of the Year for Film	Won
2017	9th Ani ng Dangal Awards	Die Beautiful	Ani ng Dangal Awardee	Won
2017	48th GMMSF Box-Office Entertainment Awards	Die Beautiful	Global Achievement by a Filipino Artist (Tokyo Best Actor)	Won
2017	1st Eddys Awards (Entertainment Editors' Choice Awards for Movies)	Die Beautiful	Best Actor	Won
2017	40th Gawad Urian Awards	Die Beautiful	Gawad Urian for Best Actor	Won
2018	3rd Illumine Innovation Awards for Television	Himself	Most Innovative TV Personality	Won
2018	5th Paragala Central Luzon Media Awards	Die Beautiful	Best Actor	Won
