= List of Lip Sync Battle Philippines episodes =

Lip Sync Battle Philippines is a Philippine musical-reality competition television series broadcast by GMA Network. Hosted by Michael V. and Iya Villania, the show premiered on February 27, 2016 succeeding Celebrity Bluff. It is the Philippine version of the American reality television series under the same title. The show concluded on August 27, 2016 with a total of 26 episodes. It was replaced by Superstar Duets on its timeslot. The show returned for a third season on April 1, 2018 on the network's Sunday Grande sa Gabi line up replacing All Star Videoke.

== Series overview ==
Season	Episodes	Originally released	
Season	Episodes	First released	Last released
1	13	February 27, 2016	May 28, 2016
2	13	June 4, 2016	August 27, 2016
3	14	April 1, 2018	July 1, 2018

=== Season 1 (2016) ===
Note: Winners are listed in bold.

No.	Contestants	Original release date	Ratings
1	**Dennis Trillo** vs. Tom Rodriguez	February 27, 2016	25.6%
Trillo: "Andrew Ford Medina" by Andrew E. "Chandelier" by Sia Rodriguez: "You Give Love a Bad Name" by Bon Jovi "Wannabe" by Spice Girls Note: Special appearances by Jennylyn Mercado, Rafael Rosell, Dion Ignacio, JC Tiuseco & Billy James.
2	**Aljur Abrenica** vs. Kris Bernal	March 5, 2016	25.4%
Abrenica: "Macho Gwapito" by Rico J. Puno "Modelong Charing" by Blakdyak Bernal: "And I Am Telling You I'm Not Going" by Jennifer Holliday "Smooth Criminal" by Michael Jackson Note: Special appearance by Gardo Versoza.^{[A]}
3	**Gladys Guevarra & Mike "Pekto" Nacua** vs. Betong Sumaya & John Feir	March 12, 2016	TBA
Guevarra & Pekto: "Sirena" by Gloc-9 "Proud Mary" by Tina Turner & Beyoncé Betong & Feir: "Love on Top" by Beyoncé "Barbie Girl" by Aqua Note: Special appearance by John Spainhour.^{[B]}
4	**Alden Richards** vs. Jerald Napoles	March 19, 2016	29.0%
Richards: "Sorry" by Justin Bieber "Doo Bidoo" by Kamikazee Napoles: "God Gave Me You" by Alden Richards "Let's Get Loud" by Jennifer Lopez Note: Special appearances by Lola Nidora's Rogelios and a VTR from Maine Mendoza.^{[C]}
5	Solenn Heussaff vs. **Lovi Poe**	April 2, 2016	25.3%
Heussaff: "Babae Po Ako" by Tuesday Vargas "Mr. Suave" by Parokya ni Edgar Poe: "The Ordertaker" by Parokya ni Edgar "I'm a Slave 4 U" by Britney Spears
6	**Bianca Umali & Miguel Tanfelix** vs. Joyce Ching & Kristofer Martin	April 9, 2016	24.3%
Umali & Tanfelix: "Bohemian Rhapsody" by Queen "Boom Boom Pow" by The Black Eyed Peas Ching & Martin: "Sinta" by Aegis "Bang Bang" by Jessie J, Ariana Grande & Nicki Minaj Note: Special appearances by Vaness del Moral & Rochelle Pangilinan.^{[D]}
7	Wynwyn Marquez vs. **Mark Herras**	April 16, 2016	25.6%
Marquez: "Sinaktan Mo Ang Puso Ko" by Michael V. "Anaconda" by Nicki Minaj Herras: "Sana ay Mahalin Mo Rin Ako" by April Boys "Holding Out for a Hero" by Bonnie Tyler
8	**Heart Evangelista** vs. Rhian Ramos	April 23, 2016	22.6%
Evangelista: "Halik" by Aegis "Vogue" by Madonna Ramos: "Lord Patawad" by Bassilyo "Total Eclipse of the Heart" by Bonnie Tyler Note: Special appearances by Diego & Lola Divas.
9	**Gabbi Garcia & Ruru Madrid** vs. Bea Binene & Derrick Monasterio	April 30, 2016	22.6%
Garcia & Madrid: "Problem" by Ariana Grande "Show Me How You Burlesque" by Christina Aguilera Binene & Monasterio: "Bring Me to Life" by Evanescence "Itaktak Mo" by Joey de Leon Note: Special appearances by the SexBomb Dancers.
10	**Manilyn Reynes** vs. Keempee de Leon	May 7, 2016	23.0%
Reynes: "Hotline Bling" by Drake "Nanggigigil" by Hagibis de Leon: "Sayang Na Sayang" by Manilyn Reynes "Queen of the Night" by Whitney Houston Note: Special appearances by Sheryl Cruz, Tina Paner, Ken Chan and the Masculados.^{[E]}
11	**Alvin Patrimonio** vs. Jerry Codiñera	May 14, 2016	22.1%
Patrimonio: "Like a Virgin" by Madonna "Gangnam Style" by PSY Codiñera: "Sumayaw, Sumunod" by Boyfriends "I Say A Little Prayer" by Rupert Everett Note: Special appearance by Balang.
12	**Boobay & Ate Gay** vs. Moymoy Palaboy	May 21, 2016	21.7%
Boobay & Ate Gay: "Beautiful Liar" by Beyoncé & Shakira "Uptown Funk" by Mark Ronson & Bruno Mars Moymoy Palaboy: "Hohoemi no Bakudan" by Matsuko Mawatari "May Tatlong Bibe Remix" by Jefferson Rey Flores
13	**Carla Abellana** vs. Rafael Rosell	May 28, 2016	22.3%
Abellana: "Bulaklak" by Viva Hot Babes "Firework" by Katy Perry Rosell: "Blue Suede Shoes" by Elvis Presley "Single Ladies (Put a Ring on It)" by Beyoncé

=== Season 2 (2016) ===
Note: Winners are listed in bold.

No.	Contestants	Original release date	Ratings
1	**Ai-Ai delas Alas** vs. Arnell Ignacio	June 4, 2016	24.3%
delas Alas: "On the Wings of Love" by Regine Velasquez "What Do You Mean" by Justin Bieber Ignacio: "My Humps" by The Black Eyed Peas "Kiss" by Prince
2	**Christian Bautista** vs. **Mark Bautista**	June 11, 2016	21.3%
C. Bautista: "My Boo" by Ghost Town DJ's "Survivor" by Destiny's Child M. Bautista: "You Oughta Know" by Alanis Morissette "Whenever, Wherever" by Shakira
3	**Sef Cadayona** vs. Louise delos Reyes	June 18, 2016	20.6%
Cadayona: "Lovin' You" by Minnie Riperton "Jai Ho! (You Are My Destiny)" by A.R. Rahman & The Pussycat Dolls ft. Nicole Scherzinger delos Reyes: "Sweet Child o' Mine" by Guns N' Roses "Bad Romance" by Lady Gaga
4	**Barbie Forteza** vs. Thea Tolentino	June 25, 2016	17.9%
Forteza: "Who Says" by Selena Gomez & the Scene "Formation" by Beyoncé Tolentino: "Bituing Walang Ningning" by Sharon Cuneta "Where Have You Been" by Rihanna
5	Jake Vargas vs. **Ken Chan**	July 2, 2016	17.9%
Vargas: "Laklak" by Teeth "Break Free" by Ariana Grande ft. Zedd Chan: "Sana Mama" by Masculados "Waiting for Tonight" by Jennifer Lopez
6	**Gardo Versoza** vs. Carmi Martin	July 9, 2016	15.8%
Versoza: "Livin' la Vida Loca" by Ricky Martin "Super Bass" by Nicki Minaj Martin: "Never Gonna Give You Up" by Rick Astley "'Di Ko Kayang Tanggapin" by April Boy Regino Note: Special appearance by April Boy Regino.^{[F]}
7	**Glaiza de Castro** vs. Kylie Padilla	July 16, 2016	15.4%
de Castro: "Bawal na Gamot" by Willy Garte "Fantastic Baby" by Big Bang Padilla: "Hello" by Adele "Lady Marmalade" by Christina Aguilera, Lil' Kim, Mýa & Pink
8	**Benjamin Alves** vs. Fabio Ide	July 23, 2016	15.4%
Alves: "SexyBack" by Justin Timberlake "...Baby One More Time" by Britney Spears Ide: "Otso Otso" by Bayani Agbayani "It's Raining Men" by Geri Halliwell Note: Special appearances by Jak Roberto, Jay Arcilla, Denise Barbacena & Mara Alberto.
9	**Camille Prats** vs. Gladys Reyes	July 30, 2016	15.7%
Prats: "It's All Coming Back to Me Now" by Celine Dion "Fancy" by Iggy Azalea ft. Charli XCX Reyes: "Wala Na Bang Pag-ibig" by Jaya "Girls Just Want to Have Fun" by Cyndi Lauper
10	**Rodjun Cruz** vs. Aicelle Santos	August 6, 2016	15.4%
Cruz: "I Will Always Love You" by Whitney Houston "The Cup of Life" by Ricky Martin Santos: "Pearly Shells" by Nora Aunor "Ice Ice Baby" by Vanilla Ice
11	Valerie Concepcion vs. **Sheree**	August 13, 2016	14.0%
Concepcion: "Blank Space" by Taylor Swift "Dance Again" by Jennifer Lopez Sheree: "Bebot" by The Black Eyed Peas "Hands to Myself" by Selena Gomez
12	**Jaclyn Jose** vs. Roi Vinzon	August 20, 2016	15.8%
Jose: "Basang-Basa Sa Ulan" by Aegis "Someone Like You" by Adele Vinzon: "I Don't Want to Talk About It" by Rod Stewart "The Best" by Tina Turner
13	**Aljur Abrenica & Kris Bernal** vs. Sef Cadayona & Louise delos Reyes	August 27, 2016	17.4%
Abrenica and Bernal: "Diwata" by Abra ft. Chito Miranda "Telephone" by Lady Gaga ft. Beyoncé Cadayona and delos Reyes: "(I've Had) The Time of My Life" by Bill Medley and Jennifer Warnes "Baby Boy" by Beyoncé ft. Sean Paul

=== Season 3 (2018) ===
Note: Winners are listed in bold.

No.	Contestants	Original release date	AGB Nielsen NUTAM Ratings
1	The cast of Kambal, Karibal	April 1, 2018	N/A
Miguel Tanfelix and Jeric Gonzales: "Stop" by Spice Girls "Gentleman" by Psy Bianca Umali and Kyline Alcantara: "Hayaan Mo Sila" by Ex Battalion "Finesse" by Bruno Mars and Cardi B
2	Andre Paras vs **Mavy and Cassy Legaspi** vs Sanya Lopez	April 8, 2018	N/A
Paras: "Give Me All Your Luvin'" Legaspi twins: "4 Minutes" Lopez: "Die Another Day" Note: The first three-way battle participate. The theme for this week's challenge was to lip sync the songs of Madonna.^{[H]}
3	Rochelle Pangilinan vs. **Andrea Torres**	April 15, 2018	N/A
Pangilinan: "Whenever, Wherever" by Shakira "Diva" by Beyoncé Torres: "My Heart Will Go On" by Celine Dion "Baile" by Rochelle Pangilinan feat. Gloc-9 Note: Former Sexbomb Girls members Aira Bermudez and Che-Che Tolentino and their former manager Joy Cancio made their guest appearances in the show.
4	Super Tekla vs. **Donita Nose** vs. Cai Cortez	April 22, 2018	N/A
Tekla: "River Deep - Mountain High" by Celine Dion Nose: "Born This Way" by Lady Gaga Cortez: "S&M" by Rihanna Note: Former Lip Sync Battle champion Camille Prats returned in her guest appearance.
5	**Ruru Madrid** vs. Rocco Nacino	April 29, 2018	N/A
Madrid: "Everybody (Backstreet's Back)" by Backstreet Boys "Umbrella" by Rihanna Nacino: "Bagsakan" by Parokya ni Edgar feat. Gloc-9 and Francis Magalona "Come Alive" by Hugh Jackman, Keala Settle, Daniel Everidge and Zendaya Note: Carlo Gonzales and Neil Ryan Sese were the co-stars of Madrid and Nacino in the 2016 remake of Encantadia. They appear as guest appearances in this episode. Former Lip Sync Battle champion Pekto reappeared in his second guest appearance with VTR appearances of Matt Evans, Ynna Asistio and Lovely Abella.
6	Mikael Daez vs. **Paolo Contis**	May 6, 2018	N/A
Daez: "Yakap sa Dilim" by Orange and Lemons "We Can't Stop" by Miley Cyrus Contis: "A Little Bit of Mambo" by Lou Bega "Beautiful Liar" by Beyoncé Note: Megan Young and LJ Reyes were the partners of the challengers and they made their guest appearances in this episode.
7	The cast of Bubble Gang	May 13, 2018	N/A
Valeen Montenegro: "Aray" by Mae Rivera "Swalla" by Jason Derulo feat. Nicki Minaj and Ty Dolla $ign Arra San Agustin: "Kahit Gaano Kalaki" by Alynna "Havana" by Camila Cabello feat. Young Thug Chariz Solomon: "Nilunok Kong Lahat" by Selina Sevilla "Bed of Roses" by Bon Jovi Note: Former Lip Sync Battle Champion Rodjun Cruz returned in his guest appearance. Fellow Bubble Gang stars, Mikoy Morales, Analyn Barro, and Ashley Rivera, were also present as part of the audience.
8	Martin del Rosario vs. Kim Last vs. **Jak Roberto**	May 20, 2018	N/A
del Rosario: "Dirrty" by Christina Aguilera Last: "Side to Side" by Ariana Grande feat. Nicki Minaj Roberto: "OMG" by Usher feat. will.i.am Note: SexBomb Girls they made their guest appearances in this episode.
9	**Kylie Padilla** vs. Gabbi Garcia	May 27, 2018	N/A
Padilla: "I Have Nothing" by Whitney Houston "Partition" by Beyoncé Garcia: "IDGAF" by Dua Lipa "Booty" by Jennifer Lopez Note: Sanya Lopez made her guest appearance; making it a reunion of the three Sang'gres of the remake of Encantadia.
10	**Migo Adecer, Ivan Dorschner and Addy Raj** vs. Kelley Day, Pauline Mendoza and Klea Pineda	June 3, 2018	N/A
Adecer, Dorschner and Raj: "Need You" by Ex Battalion "Bboom Bboom" by Momoland Day, Mendoza and Pineda: "Power" by Little Mix "Bye Bye Bye" by NSYNC
11	Solenn Heussaff vs. **Rhian Ramos**	June 10, 2018	N/A
Heussaff: "Nadarang" by Shanti Dope "No Tears Left to Cry" by Ariana Grande Ramos: "Dadalhin" by Regine Velasquez "Look What You Made Me Do" by Taylor Swift
12	Will Ashley and Sofia Pablo vs. **Miggs Cuaderno and Jillian Ward**	June 17, 2018	N/A
Ashley and Pablo: "Beauty and the Beast" by Ariana Grande feat. John Legend "Party Rock Anthem" by LMFAO feat. Lauren Bennett and GoonRock Cuaderno and Ward: "(Dying Inside) To Hold You" by Timmy Thomas "Mic Drop" by BTS
13	Inah de Belen and Mikee Quintos vs. **Mika dela Cruz and Kate Valdez**	June 24, 2018	N/A
de Belen and Quintos: "Perfect" by Ed Sheeran feat. Andrea Bocelli "Me Against the Music" by Britney Spears feat. Madonna dela Cruz and Valdez: "Memeshikute" by Golden Bomber "Fergalicious" by Fergie feat. will.i.am
14	**Ai-Ai delas Alas** vs. John Estrada	July 1, 2018	N/A
delas Alas: "Laklak" by Teeth "Hey Mama" by David Guetta feat. Nicki Minaj and Bebe Rexha Estrada: "I Will Always Love You" by Whitney Houston "She Bangs" by Ricky Martin

== Additional notes ==
^{A} Abrenica and his special guest, Versoza, the casts of Sandugo, both played the role of Machete in two different generations. This makes Versoza's appearance notable.
^{B} Guevarra and Nacua are the first tag team winner to have the Lip Sync Battle Championship Belt.
^{C} The second song of Napoles, "Let's Get Loud" is a reference to Lola Tinidora's special song in Eat Bulaga!'s Kalyeserye where Richards is a main cast.
^{D} The episode's special guests, del Moral and Pangilinan, are both co-stars of the contestants. del Moral is in Because of You with Ching and Martin while Pangilinan is with Umali and Tanfelix in Wish I May.
^{E} The second song of de Castro, "Fantastic Baby" is a reference to Yaya Dub's special song in Eat Bulaga's Kalyeserye.
^{F} Cruz and Paner, of the 80's all-girl group "The Triplets", joined de Leon's round 2 performance against Reynes, their third member of the group. Meanwhile, Chan, Reynes' co-star in the afternoon series Destiny Rose joined her as Destiny Rose himself.
^{G} Regino is the original singer of the song lip synced by Martin for her second performance.
^{H} The first three-way battle participates. The theme for this week's challenge was to lip sync the songs of Madonna.
