= Michelle van Eimeren =

Australian model

- Born: 15 March 1972 (age 54); Brisbane, Queensland, Australia
- Occupations: Beauty queen; actress; model
- Years active: 1994–2000 (Philippine entertainment)
- Height: 1.77 m (5 ft 10 in)
- Spouses: Ogie Alcasid (m. 1996; ann. 2007); Mark Morrow (m. 2009)
- Children: 2, including Leila
- Relatives: Curtismith (son-in-law)

Michelle van Eimeren (born 15 March 1972) is an Australian former actress and beauty pageant titleholder.

== Pageantry ==
She represented Australia in the 1994 Miss Universe pageant, which was held in Manila, and reached the Top 15.

== Career ==
After her Miss Universe stint, she starred in numerous Filipino films. She married Filipino actor/singer Ogie Alcasid in 1996 and had two children with him. She also wrote a children's book called Butterfly. She is also a commercial model and product endorser.

== Personal life ==
Van Eimeren currently lives in Australia with her two daughters, after her legal separation from Alcasid in October 2007. In November 2009, she married her fiancé Mark Morrow in Bowral, Southern Highlands. Alcasid and his wife Regine Velasquez were among the guests.

== Filmography ==
=== Film ===
1. Manolo en Michelle: Hapi Together (1994) as Michelle the Mermaid
2. Isko (Adventures in Animasia) (1995)
3. Pwera Biro Mahal Kita: D' Beachboys (1995) as Michelle
4. Syempre Ikaw Lang (Ang Syota Kong Imported) (1996)

=== Television appearances ===
Year	Title	Network
1995–1998	'Sang Linggo nAPO Sila	ABS-CBN
1995	Spotlight Presents: Michelle	GMA Network
1996	Coney Reyes on Camera	ABS-CBN
1996	Mikee	GMA Network
1998–1999	Brunch	GMA Network
2014	Sarap Diva	GMA Network
2017	Magandang Buhay	ABS-CBN
