= Pare & Pare =

2012 Philippine television talk show

- Title card
- Genre: Talk show
- Developed by: Caesar Cosme; Mike Rivera
- Written by: Caesar Cosme; Marcelino Landicho; Mike Unson
- Directed by: Bert de Leon
- Presented by: Ogie Alcasid; Michael V.
- Country of origin: Philippines
- Original language: Tagalog
- No. of episodes: 12

Production
- Executive producer: Roy San Luis
- Production locations: Manila, Philippines
- Editor: Edwin Thaddeus Borja
- Camera setup: Multiple-camera setup
- Running time: 30–45 minutes
- Production company: GMA Entertainment TV

Original release
- Network: GMA Network
- Release: May 20 – August 12, 2012

Pare & Pare (transl. bro & bro) is a 2012 Philippine television comedy musical talk show broadcast by GMA Network. Directed by Bert de Leon, it is hosted by Ogie Alcasid and Michael V.. It premiered on May 20, 2012. The show concluded on August 12, 2012, with a total of 12 episodes.

The show is streaming online on YouTube.

== Segments ==
Hosts

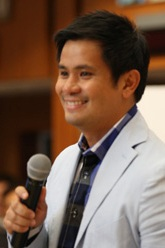
Ogie Diaz

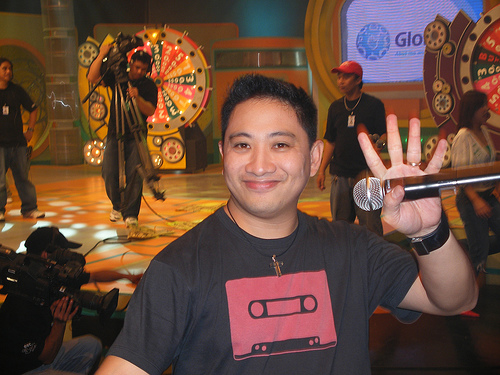
Michael V.

- The Week in Review
- Barako Tips
- Sabi-Sabi Po
- Bet Mo, Bet Ko
- Masa Poll

== Ratings ==
According to AGB Nielsen Philippines' Mega Manila household television ratings, the pilot episode of Pare & Pare earned a 20.3% rating. The final episode scored a 10.8% rating.

== Accolades ==
Accolades received by Pare & Pare
Year	Award	Category	Recipient	Result	Ref.
2012	26th PMPC Star Awards for Television	Best Male Showbiz Oriented/Celebrity Talk Show Host	Ogie Alcasid Michael V.	Nominated	
