= Leila Alcasid =

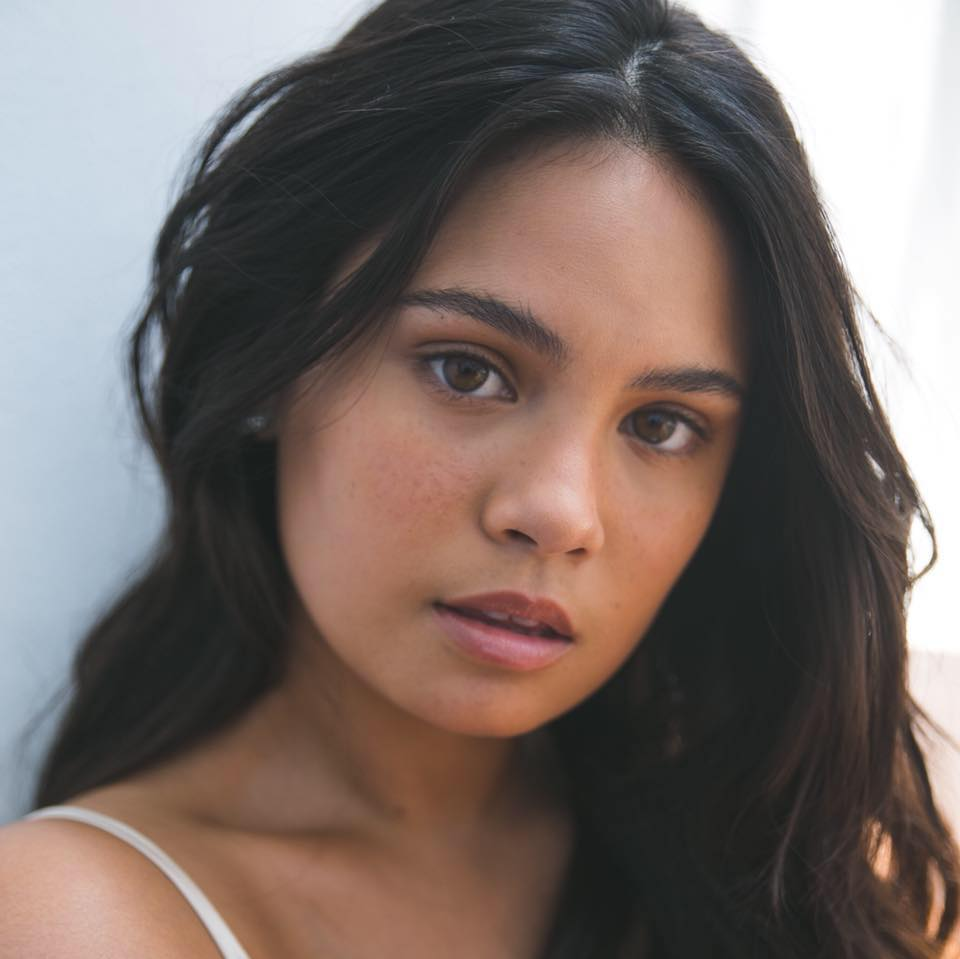

Background information
- Born: Leila Isabel van Eimeren-Alcasid; 16 October 1997 (age 28); Philippines
- Genres: OPM; pop
- Occupations: Singer; songwriter
- Years active: 2017–present
- Labels: Star Music; Star Magic
- Spouse: Curtismith (m. 2025)

Leila Isabel van Eimeren–Alcasid (born 16 October 1997) is a Filipino and Australian singer-songwriter based in the Philippines. She is currently a contract artist under Star Magic and Star Music.

== Early years ==
Leila Isabel van Eimeren-Alcasid was born on 16 October 1997 in the Philippines to Filipino singer, songwriter, and actor Ogie Alcasid and Australian former beauty queen and actress Michelle van Eimeren. She has two younger siblings: sister Sarah, and half-brother Nate from her father's remarriage to actress and singer Regine Velasquez.

Alcasid spent her early childhood in the Philippines until moving to Australia when she was five years old following her parents' separation. She attended elementary school in St. Paul's Primary School and secondary school in Chevalier College and is reported to have always had an affinity for music. Into her first year in college in the University of Sydney, she had a deeper desire to get into singing and song-writing, which set the stage for her move to the Philippines.

== Career ==
In early 2017, Alcasid moved back to the Philippines, wanting to take her music career more seriously under the guidance of her father Ogie. She and her dad started composing music together, and Alcasid began taking Filipino language lessons, to better connect with her fans and grow deeper in her Filipino roots. Her dad Ogie also took on the role of Leila's talent manager.

The media quickly took notice of Alcasid's return, and was announced to be part of ABS-CBN's 2018 Star Circle along with other young up-and-coming stars.

In January 2018, Star Music made its official announcement that it had signed Alcasid under its label, and her debut single, "Completely in Love," was released on February 23, which earned positive media reviews. The official music video was launched on Myx Philippines and Star Music's YouTube channel on 18 April 2018. She released two more standalone singles: "I'm Not" on 3 August 2018, and "Someday Paradise" on 18 January 2019.

In January 2020, Alcasid released the single "Better Weather", which served as the lead single of her first extended play of the same name. Better Weather was released on 7 February 2020 under Star Music's Tarsier Records. On 30 July, Alcasid released the song "Clouds" with producer Moophs on Semiluscent, the first extended play of Paradise Rising, the Philippines-based label of 88rising.

== Personal life ==
Upon her 2017 move to the Philippines, Alcasid gained a massive Instagram following.

Alcasid is reported to have always been open and comfortable with her modern family setup, as her mother Michelle van Eimeren had always maintained close friendships with both her father Ogie and stepmother Regine Velasquez. Alcasid resides with Ogie, Velasquez, and Nate in Metro Manila as she pursues her career in the Philippines while keeping constant communication with her mother's side of the family who are based in Sydney.

She began dating rapper Curtismith in 2019. In September 2024, Alcasid announced on Instagram that she and Curtismith were engaged. They got married on 29 May 2025 in Sydney.

== Discography ==
=== Extended plays ===
List of extended plays, with selected details
Title	Album details
Better Weather	Released: February 7, 2020 (PHL); Label: Tarsier Records; Format: Digital download, streaming
