= Yaya & Angelina: The Spoiled Brat Movie =

2009 Filipino comedy film by Michael Tuviera

Yaya and Angelina: The Spoiled Brat Movie
- Theatrical release poster
- Directed by: Michael Tuviera
- Screenplay by: Michael V.; Ramon Roco; Chito Francisco; Cesar Cosme
- Story by: Michael V.
- Produced by: Jose Mari Abacan; Annette Gozon-Abrogar; Antonio P. Tuviera
- Starring: Michael V.; Ogie Alcasid
- Cinematography: Rodolfo Aves Jr.
- Edited by: Tara Illenberger
- Music by: Vincent de Jesus
- Production companies: GMA Films; APT Entertainment
- Distributed by: GMA Films
- Release date: September 23, 2009
- Running time: 96 minutes
- Country: Philippines
- Languages: Filipino; English
- Box office: ₱64.6 million

Yaya and Angelina: The Spoiled Brat Movie is a 2009 Filipino comedy film directed by Michael Tuviera. The film stars Michael V. and Ogie Alcasid in their respective title roles. The film is a theatrical spinoff of Bubble Gang's sketch "Ang Spoiled".

== Plot ==
Angelina is a seven-year-old brilliant and talented girl, but with an undeniably spoiled personality. After her first yaya (nanny) gets hospitalized due to a fire started by Angelina while the nanny teaches her how to grill, her parents decide to find her another yaya who would control her behavior, and a lot of applicants quit the job due to Angelina's attitude.

Rosalinda “Chacha” Lucero applies for the job, and is accepted. She assumes the job of looking after Angelina as an easy task, to which the latter proves otherwise. Shortly thereafter, some Incidents occur:

- putting a can of beer in a microwave oven and causing an explosion at a supermarket,
- fighting with her classmate in a zoo, and
- going up to a belltower to disrupt the wedding that her family attends.

Angelina's mom decides to fire Chacha if she causes any more problems. Chacha is frustrated upon learning this, to which Angelina tries to make her happy, only to get her fired after accidentally killing her father's pet fish. As her parents conclude a nanny cannot help their daughter, Angelina lives momentarily without one. With no one to protect her, Angelina is accidentally kidnapped by a group of terrorists after overhearing their plan to murder the Duchess of Wellington, who is visiting Angelina's school. After receiving no response from her busy parents, Angelina calls Chacha. Angelina describes a place near a warehouse, seeing the words LOSER, which is part of a sign which reads Mano-LO SER-vice Center. Doubting Angelina's words, Chacha discharges her call. Later on, Chacha is convinced to help Angelina in order to prove the latter's sincerity. She goes to a church, where she remembers the bell ringing while Angelina was calling. There she sees the word LOSER and realizes that it is what Angelina exactly described. She realizes at once that the terrorists' hideout is near. At the warehouse, she finds Angelina and saves her. Meanwhile, Angelina's parents assume that Chacha kidnapped Angelina as revenge for firing her, which is eventually negated.

After Angelina’s escape, the terrorists' leader, Eve, kidnaps her parents and holds them unless Angelinas gives a bomb hidden in a flower bouquet to the Duchess of Wellington as she makes her speech. Chacha manages to avert the incoming crisis by switching it with another bouquet. Upon getting the bomb-ridden bouquet, Chacha enters Eve's bus and starts a cat fight with her. Seeing that her plan has been foiled, Eve takes Angelina captive. Chacha tracks them down until she reaches the rooftop. She engages Eve once again to a catfight, but as the two women fight each other, the billboard behind them crashes down, trampling Eve but miraculously leaves Chacha and Angelina unscathed.

Angelina's parents decide to reinstate Chacha as her permanent nanny. The Duchess finishes her speech and awards Angelina and Chacha for their bravery. Near the end of the film, Chacha's backside is written with the word "LOSER", and Angelina's is drawn with wings.

== Cast and characters ==
- Michael V. as:
  - Rosalinda "Yaya" Lucero – the titular character; surname is a pun on Angelina's famous catchphrase, "Whatever yaya, you're such a loser!".
  - Sean Philip
  - Bonggang-Bonggang Bong-Bong
  - Konsensyang Anghel
  - Konsensyang Devil
  - Chenelynne Kimberly Hampshire, Duchess of Wellington
- Ogie Alcasid as:
  - Angelina Arespacochaga – titular character; name comes from the word "angel" (which is opposite Angelina's personality).
  - Yaya Marimar
- Aiko Melendez as Mommy
- Jomari Yllana as Daddy
- Iza Calzado as Eve, the Lady Boss
- Leo Martinez as Principal Luis A. Tiongco (called by Angelina and Miss Cruz as Prince Epal (translated as "Prince Jerk"))
- Roxanne Guinoo as Miss Cruz
- Sheena Halili as May Dakono (a pun on the phrase "Maid ako 'no." (translated as "I'm a maid, you know"))
- Jojo Alejar as Sargeant Sarge
- Victor Aliwalas as Isko Driver (a pun on "screwdriver")
- Pekto as Bernard
- John Feir as Rey
- Julian Trono as Daniel
- Sabrina Man as Tanya

Cameos

- Dennis Trillo as Yaya's neighbor
- Regine Velasquez as Old Yaya
- Jojit Lorenzo as a supermarket chef
- Daiana Menezes as a foreign nanny
- Tess Bomb as a Chinese nanny
- Antonette Garcia as Angelina's other nanny
- Rita Carlos as a punk nanny

== Home video release ==
Yaya and Angelina was released was released on DVD and VCD by Regal Home Video, the only special feature being the full-length trailer for the movie.

== Casting ==
Francine Prieto and Antonio Aquitania portrayed Mommy and Daddy in the segment of Bubble Gang: Ang Spoiled but was replaced in the movie by Aiko Melendez, former Bubble Gang cast member, and her former husband Jomari Yllana respectively.
