= Boy Pick-Up: The Movie =

2012 comedy film by Dominic Zapata

- Theatrical Movie Poster
- Directed by: Dominic C. Zapata
- Screenplay by: Aloy Adlawan
- Story by: Ogie Alcasid; Aloy Adlawan
- Based on: Pickup Lines by Bubble Gang
- Produced by: Jose Mari Abacan; Annette Gozon-Abrogar
- Starring: Ogie Alcasid; Solenn Heussaff; Dennis Trillo
- Cinematography: Mo Zee
- Edited by: Vanessa de Leon
- Production companies: GMA Films; Regal Entertainment
- Distributed by: GMA Films
- Release date: June 6, 2012
- Running time: 110 minutes
- Country: Philippines
- Languages: Filipino; English
- Box office: ₱5,454,372.45

Boy Pick-Up: The Movie is a 2012 Filipino comedy film directed by Dominic Zapata from a screenplay written by Aloy Adlawan, who co-wrote the story with Ogie Alcasid, who stars in the title role. A film adaptation of Bubble Gang's fliptop-inspired sketch "Pick-Up Lines Battle", the film follows the titular character and Boy Back-Up outside the Pick-Up Lines Battle Arena. It co-stars Solenn Heussaff, Dennis Trillo, and Eri Neeman.

Produced by GMA Films and Regal Entertainment, the film was theatrically released on June 6, 2012.

== Synopsis ==
There is an underground battle going on in the name of love. The soldiers are all Pikapistas! With pickup lines as their weapons to woo the gorgeous Neneng B (Sam Pinto), the war sizzles in the dark corners of the metro. And there is one undefeated champion among them: Boy Pick-up (Ogie Alcasid)! Legendary, enigmatic, hypnotic, that's his appeal to most who don't get what his lines are all about, but his words penetrate their hearts just the same.

Despite his underground fame and legend, Boy Pick-up lives a normal and solitary life. When his landlady asks Boy to love her in exchange for several months of rent due, Boy is forced to look for a new job.

Boy applies as a pastry chef in Heaven's Bakeshop, a bakery owned by Angel (Solenn Heussaff). In the brink of bankruptcy, Boy saves the bakeshop when he creates a pastry delight called "fishcake". Angel feels indebted to Boy while Boy starts to fall for Angel.

Unknown to Boy, a dark force in the name of Bagwis (Dennis Trillo) is operating to destroy him, his love life and defeat him in the Pikapista battles. Bagwis wants to exact revenge on Boy Pick-up after losing the love of his life to him. Bagwis succeeds in defeating him one night during a pickup battle showdown, humiliating Boy in front of Angel.

The defeat takes its toll on Boy, his love life and his confidence. He realizes he needs to rise and rise above his situation so he can redeem himself. How will Boy emerge from the darkness? Who will help him succeed in the end, and how will he regain the Pikapista championship crown? Now, only one question remains: "Bakit?"

== Cast ==
=== Main cast ===
- Boy Pick-Up (Ogie Alcasid)

The legendary champion of the pikapista underground battles; lives a solitary life with his pet goldfish. Ironically, his love life is zero but he soon meets the love of his life when he applies as a pastry chef and sees Angel. And in this film is the end of Boy Pick-Up's undefeated streak after losing to Bagwis.

- Angel (Solenn Heussaff)

Owner of Heaven's Bakeshop, invests all her money to manage the bakeshop only to find out she's going to be dumped by the man she loves and worse, leave her almost bankrupt.

- Gabbs/Bagwis (Dennis Trillo)

A pikapista who is set to marry the love of his life; but the woman leaves him at the altar on the day of their wedding because of something Boy said. Gabbs attempts to kill himself but is rescued by a mysterious man who transforms him into Bagwis and uses him as the ultimate villain to destroy Boy Pick-up.

=== Supporting cast ===
- Queen (Jacky Smart)

The woman Gabbs is supposed to marry but had a change of heart on the day of her wedding because of something she heard from Boy during a pikapista battle. All she wants is to get to know Gabbs better before she commits to him.

- Neneng B. (Sam Pinto)

The beautiful woman at the center of the Pikapista battles.

- Boy Back-up (Eri Neeman)

Boy Pickup's crew in the pikapista battles, someone who seems to get Boy's Pick-up line.

- MC Bits (Michael V.)

The emcee of the pikapista battles

- Sharona (Diego Llorico)

Boy's landlord who is eternally seducing him. He threatens Boy with an eviction if the latter does to succumb to his charms.

- Bogart (Betong Sumaya)

Angel's loyal help at Heaven's Bakeshop

- Mayumi (Maey Bautista)

Angel's loyal assistant at Heaven's Bakeshop

- Lilia (Lilia Cuntapay)

Boy's mother who died when he was young.

- Master (Pepe Smith)

Boy Pickup's friend and master who helps him get back to his feet after his defeat.

- Boy Basag (Ogie Alcasid)

Boy Pickup's challenger who appeared near the end of the movie, taunting Boy Pick-Up and challenging him on a battle. He eventually became a regular character in the Pick Up Lines sketch in Bubble Gang. During the movie, he disguises himself by wearing diving materials and even parodying Obito Uchiha's mask and costume.

=== Extended cast ===
- Gwen Zamora as Bombshell 1
- Ellen Adarna as Bombshell 2
- Jackie Rice
- Boy 2 Quizon as Pushback
- Antonio Aquitania as Dahon
- James Ronald Moymoy Obeso as Sukli
- Rodfil Roadfill Obeso as Bagoong
- Kerbie Zamora as Bagwis Crew
- Knowa Lazarus of Q-York as Bagwis Crew
- Flava Matikz of Q-York as Bagwis Crew
- Jerome B Smooth as Bagwis Crew
- Victor Aliwalas
- Aaron Novilla as Young Boy Pick-Up

=== Cameo roles ===
- Derek Ramsay as bus conductor
- Gina Alajar as nun
- Luis Alandy as cigarette vendor
- Boy Abunda
- Vicki Belo
- Ian Batherson
- Kristoffer Martin
- Joyce Ching as grocery cashier
- Bong Revilla as Panday (pick-up battle contestant)
- Dingdong Dantes
- Joey Reyes
- Tim Yap
- Boy Logro as Boy Tokwa (pick-up battle contestant)
- Gloc-9 as narrator
- Isko Salvador, Cesar Cosme and Chito Francisco as Ang Dating Doon hosts Brod Pete, Brother Willy and Brother Jocel
- Abra
- Loonie Peroramas
- Apekz
- Dello
- Mike Swift
- Bongbong Marcos as Ferdinand Marcos
- Imee Marcos as Imelda Marcos
- Kris Aquino as Corazon Aquino

== Production ==
Boy Pick-Up: The Movie is a film adaptation of the Boy Pick-Up skits of the television show Bubble Gang. The film was made in response to positive reception by Bubble Gang fans of the show, who are also the primary target audience of the film along with those who are fans of pick-up lines.

The skit was expanded to include a back story to the eponymous character of the Boy Pick-Up skits such as details about his neighbors, daily life, romantic life, and his parents. The character of boy pick up was a concept of the production team of Bubble Gang.

== Bakit Tinawag na Neneng Bakit si Neneng Bakit? ==
In the 17th anniversary of Bubble Gang one skit or episode includes this one which explains how Neneng B came to be and it literally means How did Neneng Bakit got called Neneng Bakit?

=== Synopsis ===
In a squatters area in Manila, a young Neneng (Barbara Miguel) received expired chocolate from somebody and her grandmother (Tya Pusit) said that she should always ask before getting something, explaining why Neneng always says "Bakit?" or "Why?", after the incident her neighbor told her that her grandmother died when 5 tires accidentally fell on her. A few years later, Neneng (now Sam Pinto) now a waitress was being harassed by some customers and Boy Pick Up saw her and he saved her and coincidentally he was searching for the right Pick Up Girl so when he heard Neneng say Bakit? he knew that she was the right one and that is the reason why Neneng B. came to be.

== Soundtrack ==
Boy Pick Up Soundtrack

Soundtrack album by Various artists
- Released: June 30, 2012
- Genre: Pop
- Length: 19:00
- Label: Universal Records

=== Track listing ===
No.	Title	Performer(s)	Length
1.	"Kape Ka Ba?"	Ogie Alcasid	3:09
2.	"Pick Me Up Boy"	Ogie Alcasid & Solenn Heussaff	4:16
3.	"Ratchada"	Q-York	4:05
4.	"Henyo Ka"	Eri Neeman	2:58
5.	"Dream Sequence"	Ogie Alcasid	0:45
6.	"Gawin Ang Pick Up"	Ogie Alcasid	3:47
