= Bubble Gang =

Philippine television sketch comedy show

- Title card since 2026
- Also known as: Bblgang (Note: Since 2023.)
- Genre: Sketch comedy
- Created by: Marivin Arayata
- Directed by: Rosauro "Uro" Q. Dela Cruz; Bert de Leon; Frasco Mortiz; Mark David
- Creative director: Michael V.
- Starring: Michael V.
- Theme music composer: Michael V.; Frasco Mortiz
- Opening theme: "Bubble Gang (Pwede!)" by Michael V.; "Bubble Gang" theme by Frasco Mortiz; "Bubble Gang (BBL Mash-up Remix)" theme by Michael V. & Frasco Mortiz
- Country of origin: Philippines
- Original language: Tagalog

Production
- Executive producers: Camille Hermoso; Jan Navaro
- Production locations: Studio 4, GMA Network Center, Quezon City, Philippines
- Camera setup: Multiple-camera setup
- Running time: 25–55 minutes
- Production company: GMA Entertainment Group

Original release
- Network: GMA Network
- Release: October 20, 1995 – present

Bubble Gang is a Philippine television sketch comedy show broadcast by GMA Network. Originally directed by Uro Q. Dela Cruz, it originally starred by Ogie Alcasid, Antonio Aquitania, Sunshine Cruz, Jackie de Guzman, Assunta De Rossi, Eric Fructuoso, Susan Lozada, Aiko Melendez, Wendell Ramos and Michael V. It premiered on October 20, 1995, on the network's Friday night line up. Frasco Mortiz currently serves as the director, with Michael V., Paolo Contis, Chariz Solomon, Betong Sumaya, Analyn Barro, Kokoy de Santos, EA Guzman, Buboy Villar, Cheska Fausto, Matt Lozano, Cartz Udal, Aaron Maniego, Erika Davis, Jona Ramos, and Aly Alday serving as the current cast. It is the longest running comedy show in the Philippines.

The series is streaming online on YouTube.

== Premise ==
The show features pop culture parody, skits and sketches. It parodies television shows, adverts and famous people.

== Overview ==
Bubble Gang premiered on GMA Network on October 20, 1995. It was inspired by the gag show Tropang Trumpo. The original cast consisted of Ogie Alcasid, Antonio Aquitania, Sunshine Cruz, Jackie de Guzman, Assunta De Rossi, Eric Fructuoso, Susan Lozada, Aiko Melendez, Wendell Ramos and Michael V. Production personnel of the show, Diego Llorico and Marissa "Mykah" Flores later joined the show as cast members.

On October 14, 2011, Isko Salvador, Ceasar Cosme and Chito Francisco from the show's Ang Dating Doon segment returned to the show. On August 2, 2013, Joyce Ching, RJ Padilla, Juancho Triviño and Denise Barbacena joined the show.

In March 2020, principal photography was halted due to the enhanced community quarantine in Luzon caused by the COVID-19 pandemic. The show resumed its programming on August 21, 2020.

On May 27, 2022, Tuesday Vargas, Kim de Leon, Dasuri Choi, and Faith da Silva joined the show, while Aquitania, Mikoy Morales, Barbacena, Liezel Lopez, Arra San Agustin, Lovely Abella, Ashley Rivera, Llorico, and Flores left the show.

On July 9, 2023, Buboy Villar and Cheska Fausto joined the show, while Valeen Montenegro, Sef Cadayona, Archie Alemania and Faye Lorenzo left the show. On the same day, the show commenced filming in front of a live studio audience.

For its 30th anniversary special, aired on October 19 and 26, 2025, features previous cast members and guests, including comedians Vice Ganda and Ai-Ai delas Alas. New cast members were introduced such as Cartz Udal, Aaron Maniego, Erika Davis, Jona Ramos and Aly Alday.

== Cast ==
Current cast

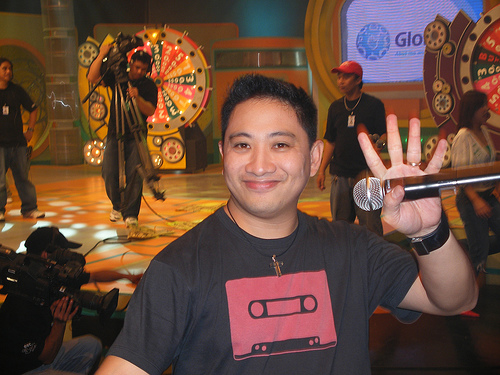
Michael V.

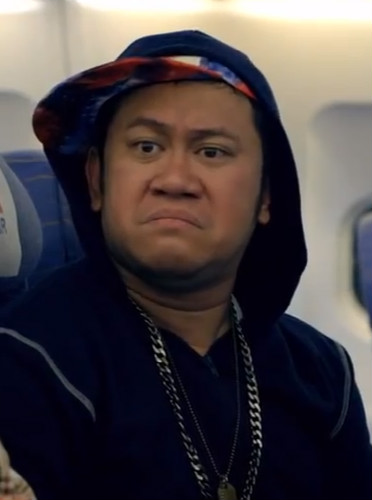
Betong Sumaya

Former cast

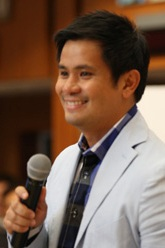
Ogie Alcasid

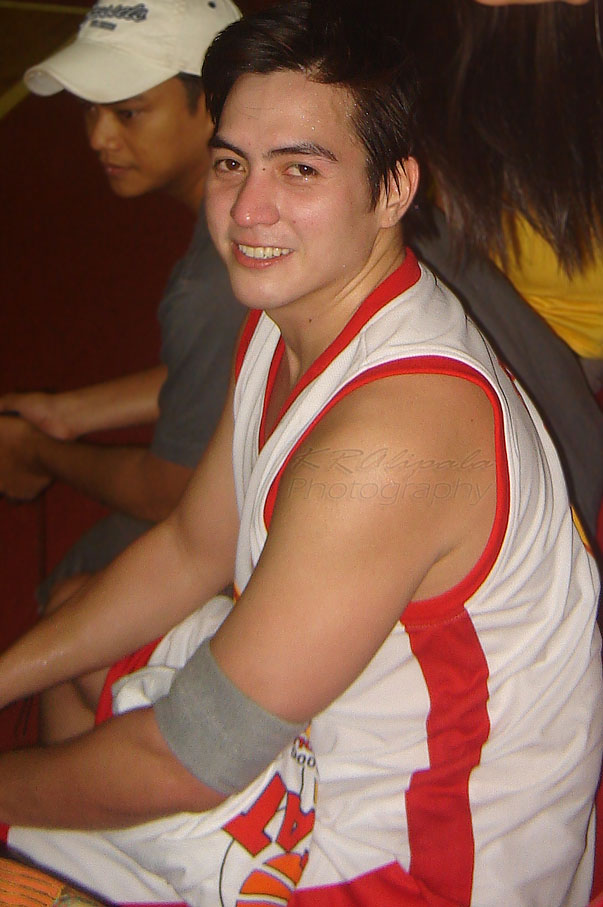
Wendell Ramos

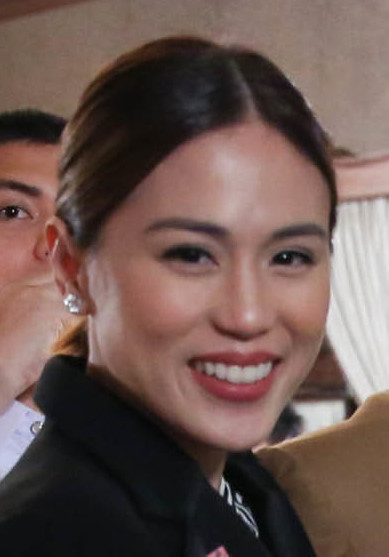
Toni Gonzaga

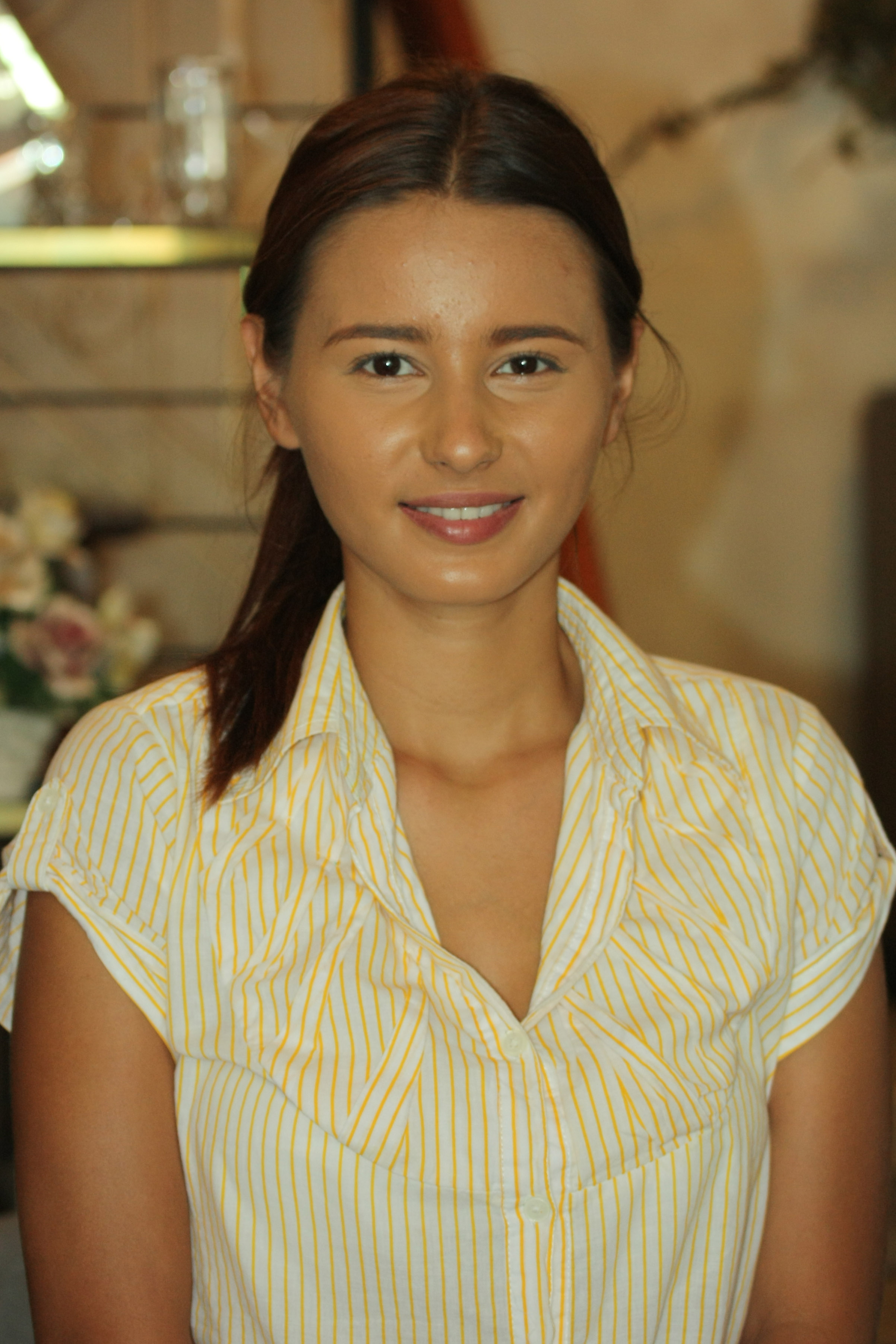
Jackie Rice

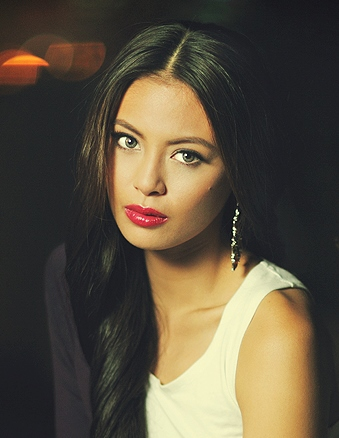
Sam Pinto

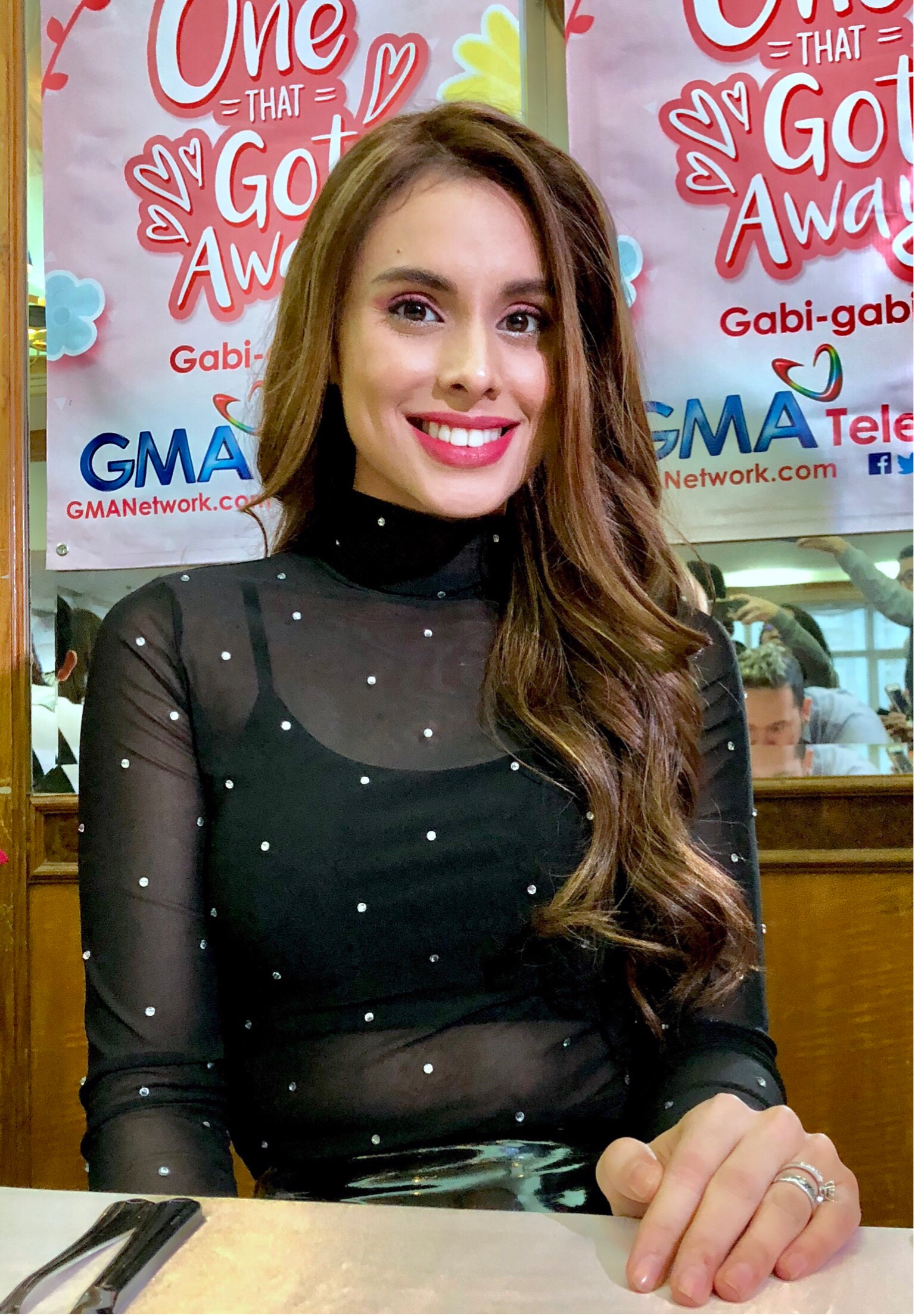
Max Collins

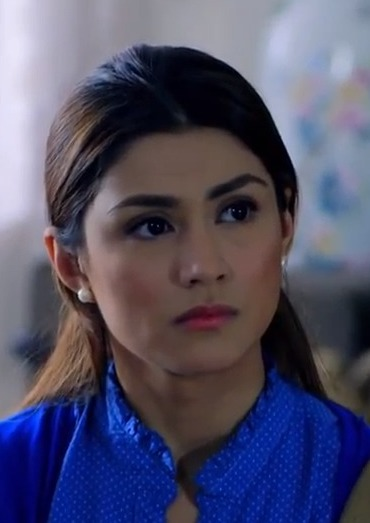
Carla Abellana

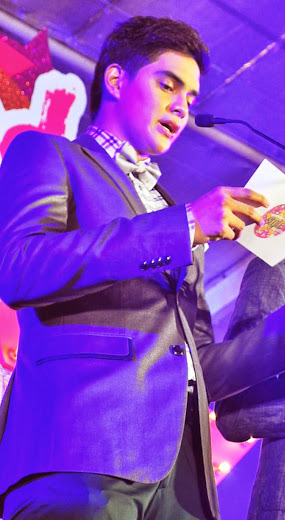
Juancho Triviño

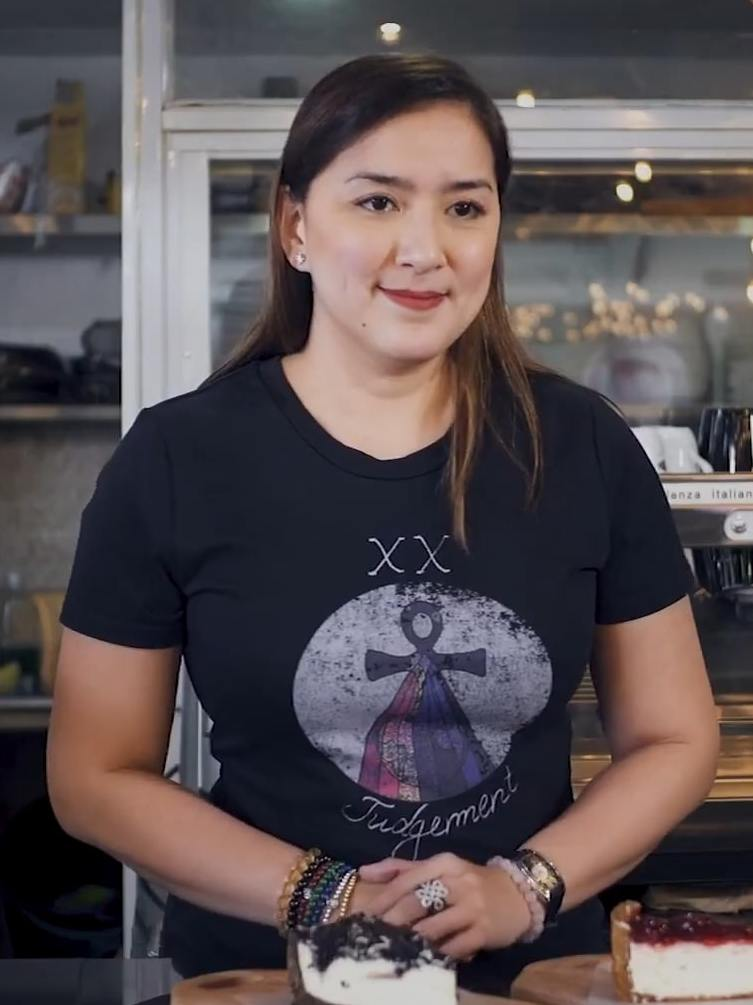
Ara Mina

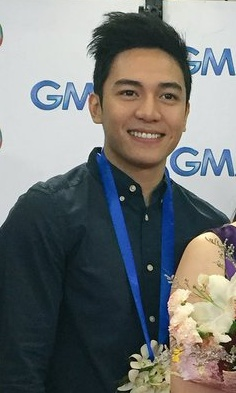
Jak Roberto

- Michael V.
- Diego Llorico (since 1996)
- Paolo Contis (since 2005)
- Chariz Solomon (since 2010)
- Betong Sumaya (since 2012)
- Analyn Barro (since 2017)
- Kokoy de Santos (since 2021)
- EA Guzman (since 2023)
- Buboy Villar (since 2023)
- Cheska Fausto (since 2023)
- Matt Lozano (since 2023)
- Cartz Udal (since 2025)
- Aaron Maniego (since 2025)
- Erika Davis (since 2025)
- Jona Ramos (since 2025)
- Aly Alday (since 2025)

Former cast

- Antonio Aquitania (1995–2022)
- Ogie Alcasid (1995–2013)
- Wendell Ramos (1995–2011)
- Susan Lozada (1995–97)
- Aiko Melendez (1995–98)
- Sunshine Cruz (1995–96; 1998–99)
- Eric Fructuoso (1995–2000)
- Jackie de Guzman (1995–2000)
- Maricar de Mesa (1995–2001)
- Assunta de Rossi (1995–2002)
- Alma Concepcion (1996–97)
- Shirley Fuentes (1996–98)
- Myka Flores (1997–2022)
- Amanda Page (1997–2001)
- Luis Alandy (1998–99)
- Aya Medel (1998–2000)
- Sherwin Ordoñez (1998–2000)
- Ara Mina (1998–2007)
- Toni Gonzaga (1998–2000)
- Isko Salvador (1998–2000, 2005, 2011–16)
- Ceasar Cosme (1998–2000, 2005, 2011–17)
- Chito Francisco (1998–2000, 2005, 2011–17)
- Sharmaine Arnaiz (1999)
- Sherilyn Reyes-Tan (1999–2002)
- Wowie de Guzman (2000–01)
- Angelika Dela Cruz (2000–01)
- Trina Zuñiga (2000–01)
- Kevin Vernal (2000–02)
- Rufa Mae Quinto (2001–16)
- Maureen Larrazabal (2001–13)
- Boy 2 Quizon (2003–22)
- Diana Zubiri (2003–09)
- Francine Prieto (2004–10)
- Bearwin Meily (2005–06)
- Jacky Woo (2007–18)
- Mark Herras (2007–08)
- Rodfill Obeso (2008–22)
- James Ronald Obeso (2008–19)
- Jackie Rice (2008–19)
- Paulo Avelino (2010–11)
- Ellen Adarna (2010–13)
- Gwen Zamora (2010–16)
- Sam Pinto (2010–16)
- Sef Cadayona (2012–23)
- Max Collins (2012–17)
- Eri Neeman (2012–13)
- Carla Abellana (2013–14)
- Joyce Ching (2013–15)
- RJ Padilla (2013–17)
- Jan Manual (2013–18)
- Mikael Daez (2013–19)
- Andrea Torres (2013–19)
- Juancho Triviño (2013–19)
- Denise Barbacena (2013–22)
- Arny Ross (2013–22)
- Kim Domingo (2015–22)
- Valeen Montenegro (2015–23)
- Arra San Agustin (2016—22)
- Jak Roberto (2016–21)
- Lovely Abella (2017–22)
- Mikoy Morales (2017–22)
- Ashley Rivera (2017–22)
- Archie Alemania (2017–23)
- Faye Lorenzo (2019–23)
- Liezel Lopez (2019–22)
- Tuesday Vargas (2022–23)
- Kim de Leon (2022–23)
- Dasuri Choi (2022–23)
- Rabiya Mateo (2024–25)

== Home media release ==
The series was released on DVD by GMA Music in 2009. The DVD contained "the best of the best" episodes of Bubble Gang throughout the years.

== Accolades ==
Accolades received by Bubble Gang
| Year | Award | Category | Recipient | Result | Ref. |
|---|---|---|---|---|---|
| 1996 | 10th PMPC Star Awards for Television | Best Gag Show | Bubble Gang | Won | |
| 1997 | 11th PMPC Star Awards for Television | Best Gag Show | Bubble Gang | Won | |
| 1998 | 12th PMPC Star Awards for Television | Best Gag Show | Bubble Gang | Won | |
| 1999 | 13th PMPC Star Awards for Television | Best Gag Show | Bubble Gang | Won | |
| 2000 | 14th PMPC Star Awards for Television | Best Gag Show | Bubble Gang | Won | |
| 2000 | 14th PMPC Star Awards for Television | Best Comedy Actor | Michael V. | Won | |
| 2001 | 15th PMPC Star Awards for Television | Best Gag Show | Bubble Gang | Won | |
| 2002 | 16th PMPC Star Awards for Television | Best Comedy Actor | Ogie Alcasid Michael V. | Won | |
| 2002 | 16th PMPC Star Awards for Television | Best Gag Show | Bubble Gang | Won | |
| 2003 | 17th PMPC Star Awards for Television | Best Comedy Actor | Ogie Alcasid Michael V. | Nominated | |
| 2003 | 17th PMPC Star Awards for Television | Best Comedy Actress | Rufa Mae Quinto | Nominated | |
| 2003 | 17th PMPC Star Awards for Television | Best Gag Show | Bubble Gang | Won | |
| 2004 | Asian Television Awards | Best Comedy Programme | Bubble Gang | Won | |
| 2004 | 18th PMPC Star Awards for Television | Best Comedy Actor | Ogie Alcasid Michael V. | Won | |
| 2004 | 18th PMPC Star Awards for Television | Best Comedy Actor | Ogie Alcasid Michael V. | Nominated | |
| 2004 | 18th PMPC Star Awards for Television | Best Comedy Actress | Rufa Mae Quinto | Nominated | |
| 2004 | 18th PMPC Star Awards for Television | Best Gag Show | Bubble Gang | Won | |
| 2004 | 1st USTv Students' Choice Awards | Best Gag Show | Bubble Gang | Won | |
| 2005 | Asian Television Awards | Best Comedy Performance by an Actor | Michael V. | Won | |
| 2005 | Golden Screen TV Awards | Outstanding Comedy Gag Show | Bubble Gang | Nominated | |
| 2005 | Golden Screen TV Awards | Outstanding Performance in a Comedy Gag Show | Ogie Alcasid | Won | |
| 2005 | Golden Screen TV Awards | Outstanding Performance in a Comedy Gag Show | Rufa Mae Quinto | Nominated | |
| 2005 | Golden Screen TV Awards | Outstanding Performance in a Comedy Gag Show | Michael V. | Nominated | |
| 2005 | 19th PMPC Star Awards for Television | Best Gag Show | Bubble Gang | Won | |
| 2005 | 19th PMPC Star Awards for Television | Best Comedy Actress | Rufa Mae Quinto | Won | |
| 2006 | 20th PMPC Star Awards for Television | Best Comedy Actor | Ogie Alcasid | Won | |
| 2006 | 20th PMPC Star Awards for Television | Best Comedy Actress | Rufa Mae Quinto | Nominated | |
| 2006 | 20th PMPC Star Awards for Television | Best Gag Show | Bubble Gang | Won | |
| 2007 | Asian Television Awards | Best Comedy Performance by an Actor | Michael V. | Runner-up | |
| 2007 | 21st PMPC Star Awards for Television | Best Comedy Actor | Ogie Alcasid Michael V. | Won | |
| 2007 | 21st PMPC Star Awards for Television | Best Comedy Actor | Ogie Alcasid Michael V. | Nominated | |
| 2007 | 21st PMPC Star Awards for Television | Best Gag Show | Bubble Gang | Won | |
| 2008 | Asian Television Awards | Best Comedy Programme | Bubble Gang | Highly Commended | |
| 2008 | Asian Television Awards | Best Comedy Performance by an Actor/Actress | Ogie Alcasid | Highly Commended | |
| 2008 | Nickelodeon Philippines Kids' Choice Awards | Favorite Television Show | Bubble Gang | Nominated | |
| 2008 | 22nd PMPC Star Awards for Television | Best Comedy Actor | Ogie Alcasid Michael V. | Won | |
| 2008 | 22nd PMPC Star Awards for Television | Best Comedy Actor | Ogie Alcasid Michael V. | Nominated | |
| 2008 | 22nd PMPC Star Awards for Television | Best Comedy Actress | Rufa Mae Quinto | Won | |
| 2008 | 22nd PMPC Star Awards for Television | Best Gag Show | Bubble Gang | Nominated | |
| 2008 | 5th USTv Students' Choice Awards | Best Gag Show | Bubble Gang | Nominated | |
| 2009 | 23rd PMPC Star Awards for Television | Best Comedy Actor | Ogie Alcasid Michael V. | Nominated | |
| 2009 | 23rd PMPC Star Awards for Television | Best Comedy Actress | Rufa Mae Quinto | Won | |
| 2009 | 23rd PMPC Star Awards for Television | Best Gag Show | Bubble Gang | Won | |
| 2009 | 5th USTv Students' Choice Awards | Best Gag Show | Bubble Gang | Won | |
| 2010 | 24th PMPC Star Awards for Television | Best Comedy Actor | Ogie Alcasid Michael V. | Won | |
| 2010 | 24th PMPC Star Awards for Television | Best Comedy Actor | Ogie Alcasid Michael V. | Nominated | |
| 2010 | 24th PMPC Star Awards for Television | Best Comedy Actress | Rufa Mae Quinto | Nominated | |
| 2010 | 24th PMPC Star Awards for Television | Best Gag Show | Bubble Gang | Nominated | |
| 2010 | UP Gandingan Awards | Best Gag Show | Bubble Gang | Won | |
| 2010 | 6th USTv Students' Choice Awards | Best Gag Show | Bubble Gang | Won | |
| 2011 | 8th Golden Screen TV Awards | Outstanding Gag Program | Bubble Gang | Won | |
| 2011 | 8th Golden Screen TV Awards | Outstanding Performance by an Actor in a Gag or Comedy Program | Ogie Alcasid | Nominated | |
| 2011 | 8th Golden Screen TV Awards | Outstanding Performance by an Actor in a Gag or Comedy Program | Michael V. | Nominated | |
| 2011 | 8th Golden Screen TV Awards | Performance by an Actress in a Gag or Comedy Program | Rufa Mae Quinto | Nominated | |
| 2011 | 9th Gawad Tanglaw | Best Gag Show | Bubble Gang | Won | |
| 2011 | 25th PMPC Star Awards for Television | Best Comedy Actor | Ogie Alcasid Michael V. | Won | |
| 2011 | 25th PMPC Star Awards for Television | Best Comedy Actor | Ogie Alcasid Michael V. | Nominated | |
| 2011 | 25th PMPC Star Awards for Television | Best Comedy Actress | Rufa Mae Quinto | Nominated | |
| 2011 | 25th PMPC Star Awards for Television | Best Gag Show | Bubble Gang | Won | |
| 2012 | 8th USTv Students' Choice Awards | Best Gag Show | Bubble Gang | Won | |
| 2012 | 26th PMPC Star Awards for Television | Best Comedy/Gag Show | Bubble Gang | Nominated | |
| 2012 | 26th PMPC Star Awards for Television | Best Comedy Actor | Ogie Alcasid | Nominated | |
| 2012 | 26th PMPC Star Awards for Television | Best Comedy Actress | Rufa Mae Quinto | Won | |
| 2013 | Asian Television Awards | Best Comedy Performance by an Actor/Actress | Michael V. | Highly Commended | |
| 2013 | 27th PMPC Star Awards for Television | Best Gag Show | Bubble Gang | Won | |
| 2013 | 27th PMPC Star Awards for Television | Best Comedy Actor | Michael V. | Won | |
| 2013 | 27th PMPC Star Awards for Television | Best Comedy Actor | Ogie Alcasid | Nominated | |
| 2013 | 27th PMPC Star Awards for Television | Best Comedy Actress | Rufa Mae Quinto | Won | |
| 2013 | 11th Gawad Tanglaw | Best Gag Show | Bubble Gang | Won | |
| 2013 | Golden Screen TV Awards | Outstanding Gag Program | Bubble Gang | Won | |
| 2013 | Golden Screen TV Awards | Outstanding Performance by an Actor in a Comedy Program | Ogie Alcasid | Won | |
| 2013 | Golden Screen TV Awards | Outstanding Performance by an Actor in a Comedy Program | Michael V. | Nominated | |
| 2013 | 9th USTv Students' Choice Awards | Best Gag Show | Bubble Gang | Won | |
| 2013 | 4th Northwest Samar State University Students’ Choice Awards for Radio and TV | Best Comedy Program | Bubble Gang | Won | |
| 2014 | 28th PMPC Star Awards for Television | Best Comedy Actor | Sef Cadayona | Won | |
| 2014 | 28th PMPC Star Awards for Television | Best Comedy Actress | Rufa Mae Quinto | Won | |
| 2014 | 28th PMPC Star Awards for Television | Hall of Fame | Bubble Gang | Won | |
| 2014 | Golden Screen TV Awards | Outstanding Supporting Actor in a Gag or Comedy Show | Sef Cadayona Albert "Bentong" Sumaya | Won | |
| 2014 | Golden Screen TV Awards | Outstanding Supporting Actor in a Gag or Comedy Show | Sef Cadayona Albert "Bentong" Sumaya | Nominated | |
| 2014 | Golden Screen TV Awards | Outstanding Gag Program | Bubble Gang | Won | |
| 2014 | 5th NSSU Students’ Choice Award for Radio and Television | Best Comedy Program | Bubble Gang | Won | |
| 2014 | 10th USTv Students' Choice Award | Students’ Choice of Comedy Program | Bubble Gang | Won | |
| 2014 | 1st PUP Mabini Media Awards | Best Television Comedy Program | Bubble Gang | Won | |
| 2014 | 1st Paragala Central Luzon Media Awards | Central Luzon's Choice for a Gag Show | Bubble Gang | Won | |
| 2015 | 29th PMPC Star Awards for Television | Best Comedy Actor | Sef Cadayona | Nominated | |
| 2015 | 29th PMPC Star Awards for Television | Best Comedy Actress | Rufa Mae Quinto | Won | |
| 2016 | 30th PMPC Star Awards for Television | Best Comedy Actress | Rufa Mae Quinto | Nominated | |
| 2016 | Asian Television Awards | Best Comedy Programme | Bubble Gang | Nominated | |
| 2017 | Golden Laurel LPU Batangas Media Awards | Best Comedy Show | Bubble Gang | Nominated | |
| 2017 | 31st PMPC Star Awards for Television | Best Comedy Actor | Sef Cadayona | Nominated | |
| 2017 | 31st PMPC Star Awards for Television | Best Comedy Actor | Michael V. | Nominated | |
| 2017 | 31st PMPC Star Awards for Television | Best Comedy Actress | Chariz Solomon | Nominated | |
| 2018 | 32nd PMPC Star Awards for Television | Best Comedy Actor | Sef Cadayona | Nominated | |
| 2018 | 32nd PMPC Star Awards for Television | Best Comedy Actor | Michael V. | Nominated | |
| 2018 | 32nd PMPC Star Awards for Television | Best Comedy Actress | Chariz Solomon | Nominated | |
| 2018 | 32nd PMPC Star Awards for Television | Best New Male TV Personality | Kelvin Miranda | Nominated | |
| 2019 | 33rd PMPC Star Awards for Television | Best Comedy Actress | Chariz Solomon | Nominated | |
| 2021 | 34th PMPC Star Awards for Television | Best New Female TV Personality | Faye Lorenzo | Nominated | |
| 2023 | 35th PMPC Star Awards for Television | Best Comedy Actor | Betong Sumaya | Nominated | |
| 2023 | 35th PMPC Star Awards for Television | Best Comedy Actor | Boy 2 Quizon | Nominated | |
| 2023 | 35th PMPC Star Awards for Television | Best Comedy Actor | Paolo Contis | Won | |
| 2023 | 35th PMPC Star Awards for Television | Best Comedy Actor | Sef Cadayona | Nominated | |
| 2023 | 35th PMPC Star Awards for Television | Best Comedy Actress | Chariz Solomon | Nominated | |
| 2023 | 35th PMPC Star Awards for Television | Best Comedy Actress | Valeen Montenegro | Nominated | |
| 2025 | 37th PMPC Star Awards for Television | Best Comedy Actor | Paolo Contis | Won | |
| 2025 | 37th PMPC Star Awards for Television | Best Comedy Actor | Betong Sumaya | Nominated | |
| 2025 | 37th PMPC Star Awards for Television | Best Comedy Actress | Analyn Barro | Nominated | |
| 2025 | 37th PMPC Star Awards for Television | Best Comedy Actress | Valeen Montenegro | Nominated | |
| 2025 | 37th PMPC Star Awards for Television | Best Comedy Actress | Chariz Solomon | Won | |
| 2025 | 37th PMPC Star Awards for Television | Best Comedy Actress | Tuesday Vargas | Nominated | |
| 2025 | 38th PMPC Star Awards for Television | Best Comedy Actor | Paolo Contis | Pending | |
| 2025 | 38th PMPC Star Awards for Television | Best Comedy Actor | Michael V. | Pending | |
| 2025 | 38th PMPC Star Awards for Television | Best Comedy Actress | Chariz Solomon | Pending | |

== Controversies ==
In September 2002, the show was sued by L.A. Lopez after the show made a character named as Ala Ey Lopez in 2001. According to Lopez, the spoof affected him emotionally. He asked 5 million pesos for damages and a public apology from the show. The case was later dismissed.

In 2013, Michael V., Rufa Mae Quinto, and GMA Network's executives, were summoned by the Movie and Television Review and Classification Board chairman, Eugenio Villareal for a mandatory conference after a sexually sensitive comedy sketch called "The Adventures of Susie Lualhati" which aired on November 29, 2013. Villareal was alarmed after what he had found of a derogatory and discriminatory portrayal of a woman in the show. Michael V., Quinto, and executives of the network met with MTRCB on December 9, 2013 to discuss the issue. It led to an agreement that the show will implement proposed measures that will ensure audiences about gender-sensitivity contents by December 16, 2013.

== Spin-offs ==
- Bubble Gang Jr. premiered on May 8, 2005 and featured child actors.
- DoSeNa, a television film to celebrate the show's 12th anniversary.
- Bungallow, a horror television film to celebrate the show's 15th anniversary.
- Yaya and Angelina: The Spoiled Brat Movie, a film based on the segment Ang Spoiled. It was released in theaters on September 23, 2009.
- Boy Pick-Up: The Movie, a film based on the character Boy Pick-Up from the Pick-Up Lines segment. It was released on theaters on June 6, 2012.
- Hole in the Wall, a Philippine version of the American game show series of the same title aired in 2009. Hosted by Yaya and Angelina - two characters created by Bubble Gang were portrayed by Michael V. and Ogie Alcasid respectively.
