= Nickelodeon Philippines Kids' Choice Awards =

- The logo for the 2008 Kids' Choice Awards
- Country: Philippines
- Presented by: Nickelodeon
- Reward: KCA Blimp
- First award: 2004 (1st awards show)
- Final award: 2008 (4th awards show)

Television/radio coverage
- Network: Nickelodeon
- Runtime: Approx. 90-120 min. including commercials

The Nickelodeon Philippines Kids' Choice Awards was an annual awards show which brought honors year's biggest TV and sports personalities voted by kids and teenagers through text and online voting. Nickelodeon, a US cable television network, brought Kids' Choice Awards to the Philippines in an effort to strengthen its presence in Asia. According to Amit Jain, executive Vice-President and managing director of MTV Networks India, China and Southeast Asia, "This is a milestone for Nickelodeon's business in Southeast Asia as it will deliver on Nick's commitment of providing global kids-centric shows and properties which are adapted to reflect local tastes and aspirations."

== Host Cities ==
- 2004 - Glorietta, Makati
- 2006-2008 - Aliw Theater, Pasay

== Hosts ==
- 2008 - Michael V.

== Nominees ==
There are a total 7 categories, with 5 nominees each for the 2008 Kids' Choice Awards.

=== Favourite Actress ===
- Kim Chiu (winner)
- Angel Locsin
- Iza Calzado
- Marian Rivera
- Sarah Geronimo

=== Favourite Actor ===
- Dingdong Dantes (winner)
- Gerald Anderson
- John Lloyd Cruz
- Piolo Pascual
- Richard Gutierrez

=== Favourite Television Show ===
- MariMar (winner)
- Bubble Gang
- Goin' Bulilit
- The Singing Bee
- Zaido: Pulis Pangkalawakan

=== Favourite Athlete ===
- Chris Tiu (winner)
- Manny Pacquiao
- Miguel Molina
- Efren "Bata" Reyes
- Japoy Lizardo

=== Favourite Musical Act ===
- Christian Bautista (winner)
- Gary Valenciano
- Parokya ni Edgar
- Sandwich
- Yeng Constantino
- Charice Pempengco

=== Favourite Cartoon ===
- SpongeBob SquarePants (winner)
- Avatar: The Legend of Aang
- Ben 10
- Dora the Explorer
- Tom and Jerry

=== Pinoy Wannabe Award ===
- KC Concepcion (winner)
- Charice Pempengco
- Lea Salonga
- Marc Nelson
- Vhong Navarro

== See also ==
- List of Asian television awards
- Nickelodeon Kids' Choice Awards
