= Bitoy's Showwwtime =

Philippine television reality show

- Title card
- Genre: Talent show
- Presented by: Michael V.; Mang Enriquez
- Country of origin: Philippines
- Original language: Tagalog
- No. of episodes: 22

Production
- Executive producer: Wilma Galvante
- Camera setup: Multiple-camera setup
- Running time: 60 minutes
- Production company: GMA Entertainment TV

Original release
- Network: GMA Network
- Release: October 17, 2009 – March 13, 2010

Bitoy's Showwwtime is a Philippine television talent show broadcast on GMA Network. Hosted by Michael V., it premiered on October 17, 2009. The show concluded on March 13, 2010, with a total of 22 episodes.

== Hosts ==
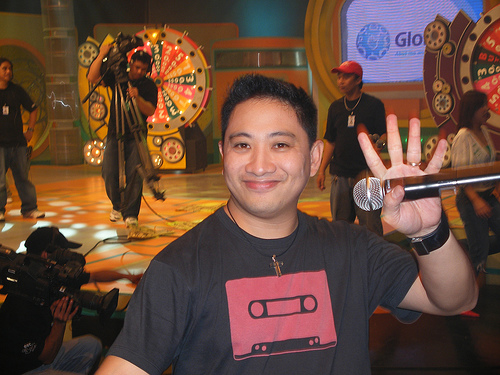
Michael V. served as the host.

- Michael V. as Mahal na Hari / Mahal na Reyna / Mahal na Kawal
- Mang Enriquez as Chester

== Ratings ==
According to AGB Nielsen Philippines' Mega Manila household television ratings, the pilot episode of Bitoy's Showwwtime earned a 22.3%% rating. The final episode scored a 12% rating.
