= Bestman: 4 Better, Not 4 Worse =

2002 comedy film by Tony Y. Reyes

- Directed by: Tony Y. Reyes
- Screenplay by: Tony Y. Reyes; Michael V.
- Story by: Michael V.
- Produced by: Orly R. Ilacad
- Starring: Michael V.; Ogie Alcasid
- Cinematography: Ely Cruz
- Edited by: Rene Dugtong
- Music by: Ed Barcena
- Production company: OctoArts Films
- Distributed by: Maverick Films
- Release date: October 9, 2002
- Running time: 92 minutes
- Country: Philippines
- Languages: Filipino; English

Bestman: 4 Better, Not 4 Worse is a 2002 Filipino comedy film directed by Tony Y. Reyes. The film stars Michael V. and Ogie Alcasid.

== Plot ==
Joey and Gracia are siblings living in the province and have stuck together through thick and thin. Joey is engaged to Gracia's friend May and was set to marry her. But when Gracia receives a call from her boyfriend Billy that he is coming home for their upcoming wedding, she requests Joey to fetch Billy at the airport. Joey was surprised to learn that Gracia was engaged and was against it. But eventually he relents as he does not want his sister to be deprived of her happiness.

Initially, Joey becomes skeptical of Billy after he fetched him at the airport. Since the distance from the airport to the province was very far, the two made use of the time on the road to bond and get to know one another. However, their supposed road-trip bonding was hampered with a lot of mishaps, conflicts and unexpected meet-ups with people they least expected to help them. All of these happened while Gracia and May got worried over their whereabouts.

Joey and Billy were able to come home together but lost their car and the special suitcase Billy brought along that contained a special gift as a result of their misadventures. But a "good Samaritan" named Yoyong was able to find the address of their house. He returned the suitcase and the car that was already fixed. Joey found out that the special suitcase Billy brought was their wedding suits (imported from abroad) that they will wear together so that they can marry their respective partners.

== Cast ==
- Ogie Alcasid as Billy
- Michael V. as Joey
- Michelle Bayle as Gracia
- Nikki Valdez as May
- Redford White as Carlos Miguel
- Andrea del Rosario as Rosa
- Long Mejia as Ritchie
- Al Arayata as Sunshine
- Yoyong Martirez as Yoyong
- Wally Bayola as Kaka
- Whitney Tyson as Assunta de Roces
- Minnie Aguilar as Mamasan
- Rudy Meyer as Mayor
- Danny Labra as Arroyo
