= Lip Sync Battle Philippines =

Philippine television reality show

- Title card
- Genre: Reality competition
- Based on: Lip Sync Battle by: John Krasinski; Stephen Merchant
- Directed by: Rico Gutierrez
- Presented by: Michael V.; Iya Villania
- Opening theme: "20th Century Boy" by T. Rex
- Country of origin: Philippines
- Original language: Tagalog
- No. of seasons: 3
- No. of episodes: 40 (list of episodes)

Production
- Production locations: Quezon City, Philippines
- Camera setup: Multiple-camera setup
- Running time: 60 minutes
- Production company: GMA Entertainment Content Group

Original release
- Network: GMA Network
- Release: February 27, 2016 – July 1, 2018

Lip Sync Battle Philippines is a Philippine television reality competition show broadcast by GMA Network. The show is the Philippine version of the American reality television series of the same title. Hosted by Michael V. and Iya Villania, it premiered on February 27, 2016 on the network's Sabado Star Power sa Gabi line up. The show concluded on July 1, 2018, with a total of three seasons and 40 episodes.

== Overview ==
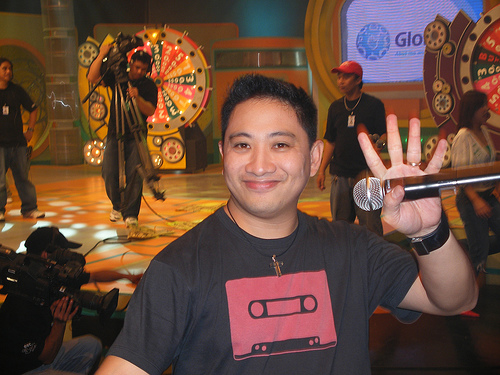
Michael V. served as the host.

Lip Sync Battle Philippines debuted on GMA Network on February 27, 2016. It is presented by Michael V. with Iya Villania serving as the color commentator.

The show is an adaptation of the American TV series, Lip Sync Battle. The game pits two celebrities against each other in a lip sync battle for two rounds. The celebrities lip sync songs of their choice. The crowd determines the winner after the two rounds have been completed.

During the third episode of the first season, the show had their first tag team battle with Betong Sumaya and John Feir battling Gladys Guevarra and Pekto.

== Episodes ==
Season	Episodes	Originally aired	
Season	Episodes	First aired	Last aired
1	13	February 27, 2016	May 28, 2016
2	13	June 4, 2016	August 27, 2016
3	14	April 1, 2018	July 1, 2018

== Ratings ==
According to AGB Nielsen Philippines' Mega Manila household television ratings, the pilot episode of Lip Sync Battle Philippines earned a 25.6% rating. The premiere of the second season scored a 24.3% rating.

== Accolades ==
Accolades received by Lip Sync Battle Philippines
Year	Award	Category	Recipient	Result	Ref.
2017	31st PMPC Star Awards for Television	Best Game Show Host	Michael V. Iya Villania	Nominated	
