= Ogie Alcasid =

Filipino actor, comedian and singer-songwriter (born 1967)

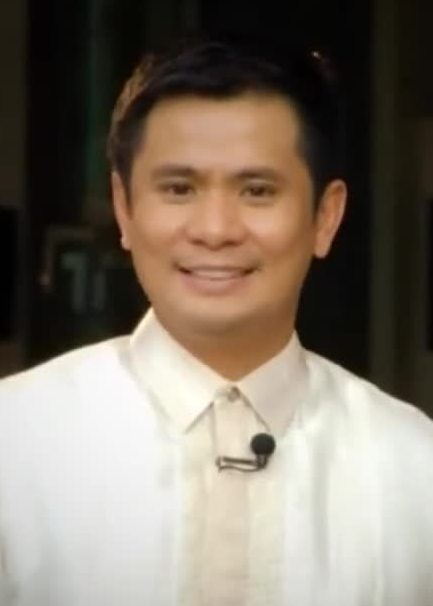
- Alcasid in 2012
- Born: Herminio Jose Lualhati Alcasid Jr. August 27, 1967 (age 59); Taal, Batangas, Philippines
- Education: University of the Philippines Diliman (BA)
- Years active: 1988–present
- Agent(s): ABS-CBN (1990–1995, 2016–present); GMA Network (1995–2013); ABC/TV5 (1994–1995, 2013–2016)
- Spouses: Michelle van Eimeren (m. 1995; ann. 2007); Regine Velasquez (m. 2010)
- Children: 3, including Leila
- Relatives: Curtismith (son-in-law); Ai-Ai delas Alas (cousin); Tita Duran (aunt-in-law)
- Musical career
- Genres: OPM; pop; novelty; CCM
- Occupations: Actor; singer; songwriter; comedian; director; producer
- Labels: Octoarts; MCA Music Philippines; Viva Records; Universal Records; Star Music
- Website: Official website

Herminio Jose Lualhati "Ogie" Alcasid Jr. (born August 27, 1967) is a Filipino actor, singer, songwriter, comedian, director and producer. He is best known for his songwriting and collaboration with other musical artists. He has appeared in films and television shows, notably as a cast member of Tropang Trumpo (1994–1995) and Bubble Gang (1995–2013), and as a host and main performer of SOP (1997–2010) and ASAP (2017–present). Since 2010, he has been married to Regine Velasquez, with whom he has one child.

== Early career ==
Alcasid is a former batch member of the all-male singing group Kundirana batch 1984 after Gary Valenciano. In 1986, he had intended to star in his first film project, with Manilyn Reynes as his love interest, but due to the People Power Revolution, production on the film was halted.

His first album was released in 1989. His debut movie was Feel Na Feel released by Regal Entertainment in 1990. In 1991, Alcasid made his VIVA films debut movie, Pitong Gamol.

== Television career ==
Alcasid's television career started as one of the hosts of a comedy show named Small Brothers on ABS-CBN in 1992. He appeared on other comedy programs such as ABS-CBN's Mana Mana (1991–92), ABC's Tropang Trumpo (from 1994 to 1995), GMA Network's Bubble Gang (1995–2013), QTV's Ay, Robot! (2005–07), and a sitcom Show Me Da Manny (2010–11)

He also branched out as a game show host, beginning in ABS-CBN's Game Na Game Na! in 1995, IBC 13's Fastbreak, a former basketball game show in 1999, the Philippine version of Family Feud on ABC-5 in 2001 and Celebrity Duets: Philippine Edition on GMA. He was a host on SOP Rules. He got his big break in Hanggang Kailan, his first drama show, and also sang its main theme with Aiza Seguerra. In 1995, he left ABS-CBN for GMA Network. In 2003, he portrayed Juan Flavier on his life story featured on Magpakailanman.

Alcasid became a judge for Pinoy Idol. and hosted such game shows as Da Big Show and Hole in the Wall. In 2013, he left GMA Network for TV5, where his first project under the channel was The Mega and the Songwriter.

In 2016, he returned to his original home network ABS-CBN after his contract with TV5 had expired. He became the judge of Tawag ng Tanghalan on It's Showtime and of Your Face Sounds Familiar starting with Kids Season 1. He is now one of the icon performers on ASAP Natin 'To and one of the main hosts of It's Showtime.

He later appeared on several GMA Network shows as a guest. He appeared as a guest on Yan Ang Morning!, Sunday PinaSaya, and Eat Bulaga! as a guest judge. He was a special guest in Sarap Diva, hosted by his wife, Regine Velasquez-Alcasid, and the comedy show Bubble Gang, where he was a cast member until 2013 before his transfer to TV5.

== Recording career ==
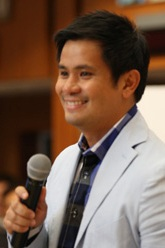
Ogie Alcasid in 2010.

Alcasid debuted as a singer in 1989 with the release of his self-titled album. Ogie Alcasid reached gold record status, while his debut single "Nandito Ako" ("I Am Here") was awarded "Song of the Year" by local radio station Magic 89.9. He has since released 18 albums, including a Christmas album (Larawan ng Pasko/"Images of Christmas", 1994), a live album (OA sa Hits (Live), 2002), four greatest hits albums and three extended plays. He has received a total of twelve gold records, three platinum records, and three double platinum records.

== Discography ==
=== Albums ===
Year of release	Title	Certification
1989	Ogie Alcasid	Gold
1990	Pagkakataon (Opportunity)	
1991	A Step Ahead	Platinum
1993	On Air	Double Platinum
1994	Larawan ng Pasko (Picture of Christmas)	
1995	A Different Light	Gold
1997	Phases	
1998	Ogie 10th-All the Best	Platinum
2000	Now and Then	Gold
2001	Movie Moments	
2002	A Better Man	Double Platinum
2002	OA sa Hits (Live)	
2003	Mga Kuwento ng Pag-ibig (Stories of Love)	Double Platinum
2004	The Songbird and the Songwriter	Platinum
2004	I Am a Singer	Gold
2005	Ogie Alcasid Greatest Hits	Gold
2006	Greatest Hits, an Audio-visual Anthology	
2006	Lumilipad (Flying)	
2007	Ogie All the Classics	
2008	The Great Filipino Songbook	Gold
2010	Ngayon at Kailanman: A Tribute to George Canseco	Gold
2012	The Songwriter & the Hitmakers	Gold
2016	Ikaw ang Buhay Ko	TBA
2017	Nakakalokal	TBA

=== Soundtracks ===
- Boy Pick-Up: The Movie (Universal Records, 2012)
- I Do Bidoo Bidoo (available only on iTunes, released in 2012)
- Hoy, Love You! (with Regine Velasquez-Alcasid for Hoy, Love You!, released in 2021)

=== Singles ===
- "Peksman" (debut single, 1988)
- "Nandito Ako"
- "Sa Kanya" (also covered by Zsa Zsa Padilla from Viva's first gospel album, Servant of All Vol. 1 in 2000)
- Pangako" (also covered by his wife Regine Velasquez, and by Martin Nievera, a duet with Manilyn Reynes)
- "Ako‘y Iyong Iyo"
- "Ikaw Sana" (it is the longest recorded song in his entire career, clocking at 6 minutes and 8 seconds)
- "Kailangan Ko’y Ikaw"
- "Pagkakataon"
- "Kung Mawawala Ka" (feat. Karylle)
- "Hanggang Ngayon" (feat. Regine Velasquez)
- "Bakit Ngayon Ka Lang" (also covered by Freestyle)
- "Ikaw Lamang" (covered by Gary V.)
- "Ikaw ang Aking Pangarap" (covered by Martin Nievera)
- "Huwag Ka Lang Mawawala" (also covered by Gary V.)
- "Dito sa Puso Ko" (also covered by Josh Santana feat. Nikki Gil)
- "Kape Ka Ba?" (Alcasid's first hip-hop song feat. Michael V. from his 2013 original comedy soundtrack album, Boy Pick-Up: The Movie)
- "Nakakalokal"
- "'Di Ka Pababayaan"
- "Ikaw ang Tanging Pag-Ibig Ko"
- "Tabakonabes?"
- "Tong Kantang Tong Kay Tsong Kay Tsang" (inspired by a former comedy segment of Bubble Gang)
- "Beautiful" (feat. Moira Dela Torre)
- "Thank You, Pa"
- "Pasko ng Mga Pinoy"
- "ILY" (with Regine Velasquez and DJ M.O.D)
- "Maga Ako Manas Ako" (credited as Eydie Waw feat. The Wawettes)
- "Huwag Mo Kong Iwan"
- "Maligaya Ang Pasko"
- "Do You Wanna Dance with Me"
- "Live with Jesus"
- "Pamilya ang Sakalam"
- "Jesus Lord We Praise You"
- "Panginoon Ikaw Lamang"
- "TOTGA nung Christmas" (credited as Eydie Waw feat. The Wawettes)
- "Let’s Pray for Healing"
- "Bakit Ngayon Ka Lang (Reimagined)"
- "Mahal Kita Walang Iba (Reimagined)"
- "Please Don't Go Away (Reimagined)"
- "Nandito Ako (Reimagined)"
- "Hanggang Dito Na Lang Ba Tayo?"
- "IN LAB"
- "Tuwing Pasko" (with Odette Quesada)
- "Sige, Laglagan Na!"
- "Ang Awit Ko Sa'yo"
- "Ikaw Lang, Mahal"
- "Ikaw Ang Aking Pahinga"

=== Extended play ===
- Praise and Worship (April 9, 2023, Star Music)
- Songs From Home (July 14, 2023, Star Music)
- Ulit (A Reimagined EP) (December 1, 2024, PolyEast Records)

=== Compilations ===
- The Story of Ogie Alcasid: The Ultimate OPM Collection (2001, PolyEast Records)
- Ogie Alcasid 18 Greatest Hits (2009, Viva Records)

=== Covers ===
- "Kung Sakali" (original by Pabs Dadivas)
- "Never Been to Me" (original by Charlene)
- "Salawahan" (feat. Urbanflow; original by The Boyfriends)
- "Sir Duke" (original by Stevie Wonder from VIVA's OPM jazz compilation album, The Best of Crossover Presents in 2003)
- "Yakap" (original by Junior)

== Filmography ==
=== Film ===
Year	Title	Role
1990	Feel Na Feel	
1990	Michael and Madonna	
1990	Small and Terrible	
1991	Tiny Terrestrial: The Tiny Professors	
1991	Pitong Gamol	
1991	Jesus Dela Cruz at ang Mga Batang Riles	
1991	Angelito San Miguel at ang Mga Batang City Jail	
1991	Kalabang Mortal ni Baby Ama	
1991	Shake, Rattle & Roll III ("Yaya" segment)	
1992	Working Students	
1992	Ano Ba Yan?	
1992	Magnong Rehas	
1992	Mahirap Maging Pogi	
1992	Ali in Wonderland	
1993	Mamas Boys: Mga Praning-ning	
1993	Mga Siyanong Parak	
1994	Victor Meneses: Dugong Kriminal	
1994	Si Ayala at si Zobel	
1994	Mamas Boys 2 (Let's Go Na!)	
1994	Manolo en Michelle Hapi Together	
1994	O-Ha! Ako Pa?	

- Manila Girl: Ikaw ang Aking Panaginip, 1995 OctoArts Films / Prime Pictures
- Isko: Adventures in Animasia, 1995 OctoArts Films
- Barkada Walang Atrasan, 1995 OctoArts Films
- Pwera Biro, Mahal Kita (D' Beachboys), 1995 OctoArts Films
- Ten Little Indians, 1996 Mahogany Pictures
- Ayos Lang, Pare Ko (It's Okay, My Buddy), 1997 GMA Pictures - Ogie's 1st GMA Pictures Movie
- May Sayad, 1998 OctoArts Films
- Nanggigigil Ako sa Iyong Kagandahan, 1998 Good Harvest Unlimited
- Pedro Penduko: Episode II – The Return of the Comeback, 2000 Viva Films - Special Participation
- Bestman: 4 Better, Not 4 Worse, 2002 OctoArts Films
- A.B. Normal College: Todo Na 'Yan! Kulang Pa 'Yun!, 2003 Viva Films
- Captain Barbell, 2003 - Enteng
- Masikip sa Dibdib: The Boobita Rose Story, 2004 Viva Films
- Shake, Rattle & Roll 2k5 ("Aquarium" segment), 2005 Regal Entertainment
- Desperadas 2, 2008 Regal Entertainment
- Oh, My Girl! A Laugh Story... 2009 Regal Entertainment
- Yaya and Angelina: The Spoiled Brat Movie, 2009 GMA Pictures
- Ang Panday, 2009 GMA Pictures 2009 Best Original Theme Song ("Tanging Ikaw Lamang") Metro Manila Film Festival
- Noy, 2010 Star Cinema - his first movie under Star Cinema
- Boy Pick-Up: The Movie, 2012 GMA Pictures
- I Do Bidoo Bidoo: Heto nAPO Sila!, 2012 Studio 5 - his first and only movie under Studio5
- Raketeros 2013, Heaven's Best Entertainment & Star Cinema
- Ang Larawan, 2017 Solar Pictures
- Kuya Wes, 2018 CineMalaya Productions & Spring Films
- Pakboys Takusa, 2020 Viva Films - Special Participation

=== Television ===
Year	Title	Role	Note
1988–1989	Eat Bulaga!	Himself	Co-host
1990–1991	Small Brothers	Himself	Host
1994–1996	Game Na Game Na!	Himself	Host
1994–1995	Tropang Trumpo	Himself	Various roles
1995–1996; 2017–present	ASAP	Himself	Main host / Performer
1995–2013; 2025	Bubble Gang	Himself	Various roles
1997–2010	SOP	Himself	Main host / Performer
2001–2002; 2024	Family Feud Philippines	Himself	Host (2001–2002); Guest / Contestant (2024)
2002	Cyborg Kuro-chan	Kuro (voice)	
2003	Magpakailanman: Minsan May Isang Doktor	Juan Flavier	Episode role
2004	Hanggang Kailan	George	Supporting role
2005	Ay, Robot!	Douglas	
2007	Mga Kuwento ni Lola Basyang: Ang Mahiwagang Biyulin	Rodrigo	Episode role
2008	Da Big Show	Himself	Host
2008	Pinoy Idol	Himself	Idol Jury Member
2009–2010	Hole in the Wall	Himself	Host
2010	Show Me Da Manny	Manny Pa-Cute	Supporting role
2010	Kap's Amazing Stories Kids Edition	Himself	Guest host
2010	Diva	Himself	Recurring role
2010–2013	Party Pilipinas	Himself	Main host / Performer
2011	Protégé: The Battle for the Big Break	Himself	Journey host
2011	Daldalita	Mateo Matias	Supporting role
2012	Pare & Pare	Himself	Host
2012	My Daddy Dearest	Bong Adonis / Sampaguita / Bong Adonis Clone	Lead role
2013	Himig Handog P-Pop Love Songs	Himself	Judge
2013	Magpakailanman: Rolando Niangar Story	Rolando Niangar	Episode role
2013	Sunday All Stars	Himself	Main host / Performer / Judge
2013	Tropa Mo Ko Unli	Himself	Various roles
2013	The Mega and the Songwriter	Himself	Host
2014	Confessions of a Torpe	Christopher "Tupe" Catacutan	Lead role
2014	Let's Ask Pilipinas	Himself	Host
2015	No Harm No Foul	Coach Jawo	
2015	Happy Truck ng Bayan	Himself	Host
2016	Born to Be a Star	Himself	Host
2016	Happy Truck HAPPinas	Himself	Host
2016	HAPPinas Happy Hour	Himself	Host
2016	Bubble Gang: 21 Gang Salute	Himself	Guest / Various roles
2016–present	It's Showtime	Himself	Tawag ng Tanghalan judge (since 2016); Co-host (since 2021)
2017	Your Face Sounds Familiar Kids	Himself	Judge
2017	I Can See Your Voice	Himself	Guest artist
2018	Your Face Sounds Familiar Kids season 2	Himself	Judge
2019	Maalaala Mo Kaya: Flyers	Carlo Magno	Episode role
2021	Your Face Sounds Familiar season 3	Himself	Judge
2024	Fast Talk with Boy Abunda	Himself	Guest
2025–2026	Your Face Sounds Familiar season 4	Himself	Judge
2026	Come Dine With Me: Celebrity Philippines	Himself	Host

== Awards ==
- Awit Awards Best Produced Record of the Year (BAKIT KA LUMAYO)
- Awit Awards Best Inspirational/Religious Recording (SIYA ANG BIDA)
- 2001 Gawad Pagkilala kay Ogie Alcasid (mang-aawit/kompositor/liriko) sa Pamamagitan ng Musika sa Wikang Pilipino mula sa Republika ng Pilipinas Sanggunian ng Wika sa Pambansang Pagpapa-unlad s/Pamamahala ng Komisyon sa Wikang Pilipino
- 2008 FAMAS Golden Artist Awardee
- 2008 Gold Record Award for The Greatest Filipino Songbook, August 31, 2008
- 2009 Platinum Award for The Greatest Filipino Songbook, April 26, 2009
- 2008 Aliw Awards "Entertainer of the Year"
- (2000, 2004, 2006, 2007, 2008 & 2010) Winner, PMPC Star Awards for TV Best Comedy Actor
- 2009 STAR AWARDS FOR MUSIC (Male Recording Artist-First Recipient)
- 2010 Aliw Awards "Best Major Concert by a male performer in the Concert Ogie and the Idols"
- 2010 PMPC Star Awards for "BEST COMEDY ACTOR (Bubble Gang)"
- 2011 PMPC Star Awards for "BEST COMEDY ACTOR (Bubble Gang)"
- 2011 GMMSF Box-Office Entertainment Awards - Male Concert Performer of the Year
- 2012 Empress Award for Best Comedy Actor
- 2012 Multiple Intelligence for music award (Multiple Intelligence school)
- 2014 KBP Golden Award Winner For Best Comedy Actor
- Myx Music Awards 2016 Magna Awardee
- 2018 49th Box Office Entertainment Awards Male Concert Performer Of The Year #paMORE
- 2018 PMPC Star Awards For Best Comedy Actor (Home Sweetie Home | ABS-CBN)
- 2018 CMMA Best Inspirational Song (Di Ka Pababayaan)
- 2019 50th Box Office Entertainment Awards Male Concert Performer of the Year

Year	Award giving body	Category	Recipient(s) and nominee(s)	Results	Ref.
2000	Aliw Awards	Best Male Performance in Music Lounges, Bars, Clubs and Restaurants	Himself	Won	
2000	Awit Awards	Best Ballad Recording	"Kung Mawawala Ka"	Won	
2000	Awit Awards	Song of the Year	"Kung Mawawala Ka"	Won	
2000	MTV Pilipinas Music Awards	Best Male Music Video Award	"Kung Mawawala Ka"	Won	
2000	RX 93.1 Awards	OPM Male Artist of the Year	Himself	Won	
2001	Aliw Awards	Best Male Performance in Music Lounges, Bars, Clubs and Restaurants	Himself	Won	
2001	Awit Awards	Song of the Year	"Kailangan Ko'y Ikaw"	Won	
2001	Awit Awards	Best Ballad Recording	"Kailangan Ko'y Ikaw"	Won	
2001	Awit Awards	Best Movie/TV/Stage Theme Song Recording	"Kailangan Ko'y Ikaw"	Won	
2001	Famas Awards	Best Movie Theme Song of the Year	"Kailangan Ko'y Ikaw"	Won	
2001	MTV Pilipinas Music Awards	Best Song Music Video Award	"Kahit Na"	Won	
2001	MTV Pilipinas Music Awards	Best Male Music Video Award	"Kahit Na"	Won	
2001	National Mother's and Father's Day Foundation, Inc.	Tanyag Na Ulirang Ama	Himself	Won	
2001	PMPC Star Awards for TV	Best Movie Theme Song of The Year	"Kailangan Ko'y Ikaw"	Won	
2002	Aliw Awards	Best Male Performance in Music Lounges, Bars, Clubs and Restaurants	Himself	Won	
2002	Awit Awards	Album of the Year	"A Better Man"	Won	
2002	Awit Awards	Best Performance by a Male Recording Artist	"Ikaw Sana"	Won	
2002	PMPC Star Awards for TV	Best Comedy Actor	Bubble Gang	Won	
2003	Aliw Awards	Best Male Performance In A Concert	"OA Sa Hits!"	Won	
2003	Aliw Awards	Entertainer Of The Year	"OA Sa Hits!"	Won	
2003	Famas Awards	Best Movie Theme Song of the Year	"Kailangan Kita"	Won	
2003	Manila Film Festival	Best Original Movie Theme Song of the Year	"Pangarap Ko"	Won	
2003	MTV Pilipinas Music Awards	Favorite Male Artist	Himself	Won	
2003	National Press Club Tinig Awards	Top Ten Singers of the Philippines	Himself	Included	
2003	PMPC Star Awards for Movies	Best Movie Theme Song of the Year	"Kailangan Kita"	Won	
2004	Aliw Awards	Best Major Concert (Male)	"OA @ 15"	Won	
2004	Awit Awards	Best Song Written for Movie/TV/Stage Play	"Pangarap Ko Ang Ibigin Ka"	Won	
2004	GMMSF Box-Office Entertainment Awards	Most Popular Male Singer/Entertainer	Himself	Won	
2004	Golden Screen TV Awards	Best Original Song	"Pangarap Ko Ang Ibigin Ka"	Won	
2004	Golden Screen TV Awards	Best Male TV Host	"S.O.P."	Won	
2004	National Press Club Tinig Awards	Top Ten Singers of the Philippines	Himself	Included	
2004	PMPC Star Awards for Television	Best Male TV Host	"S.O.P."	Won	
2004	PMPC Star Awards for Television	Best Comedy Actor	Bubble Gang	Won	
2005	Aliw Awards	Entertainer Of The Year	Himself	Won	
2005	GMMSF Box-Office Entertainment Awards	Most Popular Male Singer/Entertainer	Himself	Won	
2005	Golden Screen TV Awards	Outstanding Performance in a Comedy Gag Show	Bubble Gang	Won	
2006	Aliw Awards	Best Major Concert	Himself	Won	
2006	Aliw Awards	Entertainer Of The Year	Himself	Won	
2006	GMMSF Box-Office Entertainment Awards	Most Popular Male Entertainer of the Year	Himself	Won	
2006	MYX Music Awards	Favorite Male Artist	Himself	Nominated	
2006	MYX Music Awards	Favorite Mellow Video	"Hello"	Nominated	
2006	PMPC Star Awards for TV	Best Comedy Actor	Bubble Gang	Won	
2007	MYX Music Awards	Favorite Collaboration	"Hindi Ko Na Kayang Masaktan Pa" with Regine Velasquez	Nominated	
2008	Aliw Awards	Best Major Concert Male	Himself	Won	
2008	Aliw Awards	Entertainer of the Year	Himself	Won	
2008	Awit Awards	Best Movie/TV/Stage Theme Song	"Paano kita Iibigin"	Won	
2008	PMPC Star Awards for Movies	Movie Theme Song Of The Year	Pano Ba Kita Iibigin	Won	
2008	PMPC Star Awards for TV	Best Comedy Actor	Bubble Gang	Won	
2022	Jeepney TV Fan Favorite Awards	Favorite Musical/Variety Show Host	It's Showtime	Nominated	

== Business career ==
- Owner of chain of hot dog stalls called Oggie Doggie.
- He co-owns Ryu Ramen and Curry Restaurant
- He co-owns Hungry Samurai, a Japanese fast food restaurant
- He is Chairman of opm2go.com, an online music store
- Founder of ATEAM (Alcasid Total Events & Artist Management, Inc.) 2014–present www.ateam.com.ph

== Non-entertainment activities ==
- President of Organisasyon ng Pilipinong Mang-Aawit, an organization of singers (2010 – present)
- Commissioner of the EDSA People Power Commission (2011 – 2016)
- Sagip Foundation Spokesperson
- Kapuso Foundation, Ogie and Regine Ukay-Ukay
- National Commission for Culture and Arts, Heritage/ASEAN Ambassador
- Childhope Asia Spokesperson

== Personal life ==
In 1995, Alcasid married Australian beauty queen Michelle van Eimeren, who represented Australia in the 1994 Miss Universe pageant held in the Philippines. Together, they have two children, Leila (born 1997) and Sarah (born 2002). In 2007, Alcasid announced that he and van Eimeren had separated.

On June 7, 2024, Sarah earned her Bachelor of Science in Nursing from the University of Notre Dame Australia. Her graduation was attended by her sister, Leila Alcasid, and their mom, Michelle van Eimeren.

On December 22, 2010, he married Regine Velasquez at a resort in Nasugbu, Batangas. Together, they have a son named Nathaniel James ("Nate"), born on November 8, 2011. On April 25, 2024, Nate graduated primary education at Centro Montessori Internationale, Xavierville Ave, Quezon City.

Alcasid is an Evangelical Christian and attends Victory Christian Fellowship services.

Comedienne Ai-Ai De las Alas is his cousin through his mother. He is also the cousin-in-law of Francis Magalona.

=== Education ===
Alcasid obtained his primary education (from 1974 to 1981) and secondary education (from 1981 to 1985) from La Salle Green Hills.

He attended the University of the Philippines Diliman from 2002 to 2006 (from 1986 to 1993) and graduated with the degree of Bachelor of Arts in Broadcast Communication.
