= Diego Llorico =

Filipino actor and comedian

- Born: Pasay, Rizal, Philippines
- Other name: Diego
- Occupations: Actor, comedian, segment producer
- Years active: 1995–present
- Known for: Bubble Gang

Diego Llorico, known mononymously as Diego, is a Filipino actor, segment producer and comedian. He is known for his appearances on the comedy films Boy Pick-Up: The Movie (2012) and D' Kilabots Pogi Brothers Weh?! (2012), and the television comedy sketch gag show Bubble Gang.

== Career ==
Llorico began his career in Philippine television in 1995 after friends working on the variety shows Vilma! and an ABC-5 (now TV5) program invited him to work as a production assistant. He later joined GMA Network, where he a met coordinator and television host German "Kuya Germs" Moreno. According to Llorico, he was eventually encouraged to remain with the network and was hired as a production assistant for Bubble Gang, marking the beginning of his long association with the sketch comedy program.

Although he initially worked behind the scenes, Llorico later became an associate producer of Bubble Gang. In interviews, he recalled that he had previously served as a production assistant on other television programs while continuing his office work before joining the show's production staff full-time.

Llorico's transition from production staff to on-screen performer happened after the show's writers and cast needed assistance with a sketch involving gay lingo. He was asked to participate in the segment and subsequently became a cast member. He later described becoming part of Bubble Gang as one of the greatest fulfillments of his life.

In a 2016 interview, Llorico said that he had never expected to remain with Bubble Gang for so many years, expressing gratitude that he had been part of the program since his days as a production assistant.

Llorico became known for his different facial features, particularly his prominent lips, which inspired recurring comedy segments such as Lips to Lips Battle and At Lit on Bubble Gang.

Alongside his television career, Llorico also ventured into business. In 2018, he and four partners invested in Pinkbird Korean Restaurant and Dessert Café on Scout Borromeo Street in Quezon City. Llorico said that he considered having a business a more secure way of preparing for life beyond show business, which he recognized as a career that would not last forever.

In 2022, GMA Network announced changes to the cast of Bubble Gang, with Llorico no longer listed as a cast member. He clarified in an interview with the Philippine Entertainment Portal that he harbored no ill feelings over the decision, saying that he remained with the program as its associate producer—the position in which he had originally started—and continued to make occasional cameo appearances when needed.

== Filmography ==
=== Film ===
Year	Title	Role
1998	Sagad sa Init	
2000	Bakit Ba Ganyan?	Himself
2002	Bakit Papa	Himself
2006	Reyna	
2009	OMG (Oh, My Girl!)	Marddie
2009	Ded Na Si Lolo	
2012	Boy Pick-Up: The Movie	Sharona
2012	D' Kilabots Pogi Brothers Weh?!	Ngengio
2013	Ang Huling Henya	Guest As Club Ramp
2014	Kamandag ni Venus	
2023	Home I Found In You	Mama Rana

=== Television ===
Year	Title	Role
1996–present	Bubble Gang	Himself / Main Cast / Segment producer
1997–2023	Eat Bulaga	Himself / Guest
1999–2003	Beh Bote Nga	Himself / Main Cast
1999	Maynila	Guest
2003–2008	Nuts Entertainment	Himself / Main Cast
2004	Marinara	Dikoy
2005	Hokus Pokus	
2005–2007	HP: To The Highest Level Na!	Diday
2009	Ful Haus	
2010	Kaya ng Powers	Bebe Girl
2010	Pepito Manaloto	Richie
2010	Diva	Cams
2010	Jillian: Namamasko Po	Francine's friend
2012	Magpakailanman: The Ryzza Mae Dizon Story	Michael
2014	Innamorata	Bex
2014	Vampire ang Daddy Ko	Guest
2015	Sabado Badoo	Himself / Cameo Stock Footage
2015	Celebrity Bluff	Himself / Guest player
2015	Buena Familia	Enrico Perez
2016	Pepito Manaloto: Ang Tunay na Kwento	Various Roles / Guest
2016	Dear Uge	Various Roles / Guest
2017	Sunday Pinasaya	Various Roles / Guest
2017	Tsuperhero	Tikboy Kutsero
2017	All Star Videoke	Himself / Guest player
2018	Daddy's Gurl	Guest
2018	Tadhana	Various Roles / Guest
2019	The Boobay and Tekla Show	Himself / Guest
2020	All-Out Sundays	Himself / Guest
2021	Mars Pa More	Himself / Guest
2022	TiktoClock	Himself / Guest
2023	Walang Matigas na Pulis sa Matinik na Misis	Barangay Tanod
2024	Wish Ko Lang	Guest
