= Hole in the Wall (Philippine game show) =

Philippine television game show

- Title card
- Genre: Game show
- Based on: Brain Wall
- Developed by: FremantleMedia
- Presented by: Ogie Alcasid; Michael V.
- Country of origin: Philippines
- Original language: Tagalog
- No. of seasons: 2
- No. of episodes: 235

Production
- Production locations: Quezon City, Philippines
- Camera setup: Multiple-camera setup
- Running time: 30 minutes
- Production company: GMA Entertainment TV Group

Original release
- Network: GMA Network
- Release: April 20, 2009 – November 27, 2010

Hole in the Wall is a Philippine television game show broadcast by GMA Network. Hosted by Michael V. and Ogie Alcasid, it premiered on April 20, 2009 on the network's Telebabad line up. The show concluded on November 27, 2010, with a total of two seasons and 235 episodes.

== Hosts ==
Hosts

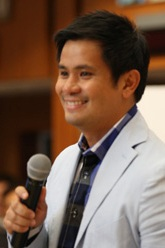
Ogie Alcasid

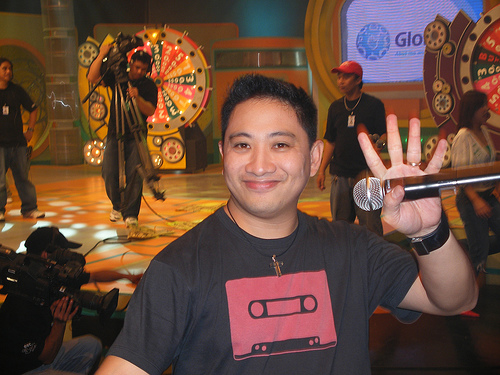
Michael V.

- Ogie Alcasid as Angelina and Kim Min Yung
- Michael V. as Yaya and Bianca

== Ratings ==
According to AGB Nielsen Philippines' Mega Manila household television ratings, the series premiere of Hole in the Wall earned a 27.7% rating. The season one's finale scored an 11.6% rating. The premiere of the second season achieved a 6.2% rating. The series finale gathered a 2% rating.

== Accolades ==
Accolades received by Hole in the Wall
Year	Award	Category	Recipient	Result	Ref.
2010	24th PMPC Star Awards for Television	Best Game Show Host	Ogie Alcasid and Michael V.	Nominated	
2011	25th PMPC Star Awards for Television	Best Game Show Host	Ogie Alcasid and Michael V.	Nominated	
