= Michael V. =

Filipino actor and comedian (born 1969)

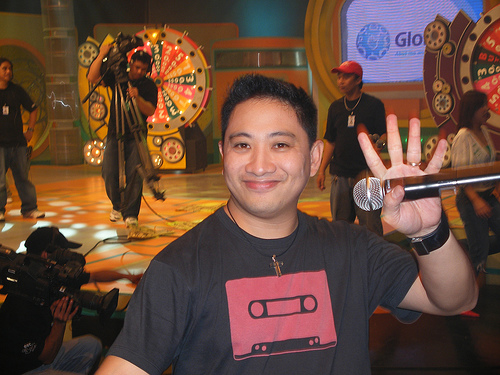
- Michael V. on the set of Eat Bulaga!
- Born: Beethoven Del Valle Bunagan; December 17, 1969 (age 56); Pandacan, Manila, Philippines
- Other names: Michael V.; Bitoy
- Education: Pamantasan ng Lungsod ng Maynila (BA)
- Occupations: Comedian; actor; television host; singer; rapper; songwriter; director; content creator
- Years active: 1991–present
- Employer: GMA Network
- Agent: Sparkle (1995–present)
- Spouse: Carol Bunagan (m. 1994)
- Children: 4
- Musical career
- Genres: Pop; OPM; rap; novelty; parody
- Labels: EMI; OctoArts; Polyeast; GMA
- Website: Michael V's Profile in GMANetwork.com

YouTube information
- Channel: Michael V. #BitoyStory
- Years active: 2017–present
- Genres: Comedy; motivational; technology review; travel
- Subscribers: 1.35 million
- Views: 38.7 million
- Last updated: November 16, 2025

Beethoven Del Valle Bunagan (born December 17, 1969), professionally known as Michael V. and nicknamed Bitoy, is a Filipino comedian, actor, television host, singer, rapper, songwriter, director, and content creator known for his contributions to Philippine television comedy. He first gained attention in the late 1980s as a rapper and parody singer before making his television debut on Ready, Get Set, Go! in 1992. He later rose to prominence as a cast member of the long-running sketch comedy show Bubble Gang (1995–present), where he became known for his impersonations, parody songs, and satirical sketches.

Michael V. also headlined the sitcom Pepito Manaloto (2010–present), one of the longest-running comedy series on Philippine television. Beyond acting, he hosted several television programs, appeared in films, directed the film Family History (2019), and later expanded into YouTube content creation. Throughout his career, he received several local and international awards, including multiple Asian Television Awards for Best Comedy Performance by an Actor.

== Early life ==
Michael V. was born as Beethoven Del Valle Bunagan on December 17, 1969, at Clinica dela Rosa in Pandacan, Manila to Cesar Felix Bunagan and Melba Balonzo del Valle. His father named him after German composer Ludwig van Beethoven, upon seeing a copy of Beethoven's LP in his boss' office, not knowing that "Beethoven" is a surname.

The nickname "Bitoy" was taken from a children's show character played by comedian Bentot. When Bentot, as Bitoy, guested in Iskul Bukol, then-high school student Beethoven saw it and began mimicking Bentot's voice in school. His classmates then called him "Bitoy", to which the nickname stuck to this day. He finished his secondary education in Manila Science High School. Michael V. later earned a degree in mass communications from the Pamantasan ng Lungsod ng Maynila.

== Career ==
=== Late 1980s: Entering the entertainment industry ===
Michael V. regularly watched comedians Gary Bautista and Willie Nepomuceno, developing a strong interest in their methods of constructing and impersonating voices and visual personas. Through experimenting with a tape recorder, he learned that he could monitor his own voice and refine it repeatedly until he achieved the desired result, with an elderly man's voice becoming his preferred characterization. He adds that when he portrayed an old man in a grade school play, the positive audience response made him recognize the potential of this ability as a professional avenue. Michael V. participated in several competitions, including a Boy George sing-alike contest on Student Canteen and a Menudo sing-alike contest on Big Bold Channel, as well as various other contests, but he notes that he never won any of them.

Michael V. began his career through the Eat Bulaga! rap contest Check 2000 with fellow rapper Lady Dianne, where actor and judge Ogie Alcasid gave him the lowest score, resulting in his loss. After their defeat in the grand finals, he recalls saying, "Sabi ko I will never rap again!" Lady Dianne received a contract from record label OctoArts despite their loss, while he did not. She later heard "Maganda Ang Pillin (Ayoko Ng Panget)", his response to Andrew E.'s "Humanap Ka ng Panget!", and asked for his demo tape. By chance, his tape was included in the batch submitted to OctoArts, who heard his song and signed him soon afterward. When he entered the entertainment industry, he and his manager Orly Ilacad needed to establish a marketable screen name appropriate for his emerging career as a rapper, during a period when Francis Magalona and Andrew E. were the leading figures in the genre. Ilacad asked him to name his favorite artists, to which he replied that internationally he admired Michael Jackson and locally he looked up to Gary Valenciano. He explains that these references were combined to form his screen name, noting, "So they merged that, and I became Michael V.".

In 1992, Michael V. made his television debut on the ABS-CBN Network through Ready, Get Set, Go!.

=== 1994–2017: Major breakthrough and long-running success in Bubble Gang and Pepito Manaloto ===
In 1994, Michael V. and Ogie Alcasid joined the segment Battle of the Brainless on the television sketch comedy show Tropang Trumpo, alongside Earl Ignacio, Gelli De Belen, and Carmina Villarroel. The segment was a parody of the game show Battle of the Brains. In mid-1995, the two left the show to join the sketch comedy program Bubble Gang, which aired on GMA Network. In this program, Michael V. gained recognition for his character impersonations, parodic sketches, and literal translations of songs from prominent local and international artists, including "Bumalik Na Sa Akin Ngayon", a comedic rendition of Celine Dion's "It's All Coming Back To Me Now", "Kama Ni Rossana", derived from Bon Jovi's "Bed of Roses", and "May Isa Na Namang Kumagat Sa Alikabok", adapted from Queen's "Another One Bites the Dust".

In 1997, Michael V. launched his own comedy hosting television program, Bitoy's Adventures in Bilibka!, where his impersonation skills further developed, and he became known for his expertise in disguise. Michael V. released his first song "Sinaktan Mo Ang Puso Ko", which became a hit and surpassed Jessa Zaragoza's "Bakit Pa" at the Awit Awards in 1998, during which he and her was part of the record label OctoArts family. Michael V. and Ogie Alcasid both starred in the comedy film Bestman: 4 Better, Not 4 Worse in 2002. Michael V. later co-starred with Vic Sotto in Lastikman (2003) and Enteng Kabisote: Okay Ka, Fairy Ko! The Legend (2004). Michael V. received the Asian Television Award for Best Comedy Performance by an Actor in 2004, 2005, and 2006. Michael V. hosted Bitoy's Funniest Videos from 2004 until its conclusion in 2009. In 2007, he participated in the drama series Marimar, providing the voice for the titular character's pet dog, Fulgoso. He played a supporting role in the drama series Codename: Asero. On August 23, 2008, Michael V. was officially informed that he will grace the front cover of Reader's Digest fifth Annual Humor Special, September issue. Making him the second Filipino whoever landed on the covers of Reader's Digest next to former Philippine President Corazon Aquino.

From 2009 to 2010, Michael V. hosted the game show Hole in the Wall with Ogie Alcasid and hosted Bitoy's Showwwtime on his own. In September 2009, Michael V. and Alcasid starred in the comedy film Yaya and Angelina: The Spoiled Brat Movie, which was a spin-off of the Ang Spoiled segment from the television sketch comedy Bubble Gang. Michael V. also won as a Celebrity Inductee to the Eastwood City Walk Of Fame Philippines in the same year. In 2010, Michael V. headlined his first television comedy program, playing the lead role in Pepito Manaloto alongside Manilyn Reynes. In the same year, Michael V. became Nestle Philippines' Laki sa Gatas advocate for Bear Brand Milk. In 2012, Michael V. and Ogie Alcasid hosted the comedy musical talk show Pare & Pare. In the same year, Michael V. and Alcasid starred in the comedy film Boy Pick-Up: The Movie alongside Solenn Heussaff and Dennis Trillo, which was adapted from the Pickup Lines segment of Bubble Gang. Michael V. co-hosted the reality competition Lip Sync Battle Philippines with Iya Villania in 2016. In the same year, he conceptualized the sitcom series Tsuperhero along with Caesar Cosme. Also on January 30, 2016, Michael V. leaves Eat bulaga! as a co-host.

=== 2017–present: YouTube career and directorial film debut ===
Michael V. started his YouTube career in 2017. In 2019, he returns to film and make also his directorial debut film Family History produced by GMA Pictures and Michael V.'s Mic Test Entertainment. Following the passing of former director Bert de Leon in 2021, Michael V. took charge of the directorial duties for Pepito Manaloto: Tuloy ang Kuwento since June 2022.

== Personal life ==
Michael V. and his wife Carol have 4 children. In August 2013, he was hospitalized for dengue fever, according to actor Ogie Alcasid tweet. Both Alcasid and Michael V. solicited prayers and platelet donations. The following days, Michael V. tweeted about his recovery and thanked his fans for prayers and support.

On July 20, 2020, Michael V. announced he had tested positive for COVID-19 on his vlog and by August 11, he confirmed his recovery.

== Filmography ==
=== Television ===
Year	Title	Role	Notes
1991–1997	Ready, Get Set, Go!	Himself (host)	
1992	Home Along Da Riles	Unknown	
1993	Haybol Rambol	Charlie	
1994–1995	Tropang Trumpo	Himself	
1995–present	Bubble Gang	Himself	Various roles, ceative director
1996	Bilibitornat	Himself (host)	
1997–2000	Bitoy's Adventures in Bilibkaba!	Himself (host)	
1999–2000	Ooops!	Himself	Director
2001	Bitoy's World	Betong / Etoy / Bebang	
2002	Ready, Text, Go!	Himself (host)	
2003–2004	Celebrity Turns with Junee and Lani	Junee Lee	
2004–2009	Bitoy's Funniest Videos	Himself (host)	
2004–2016; 2019; 2021	Eat Bulaga!	Himself (host)	
2007–2008	Marimar	Fulgoso (Voice)	
2008	Codename: Asero	Bodjie X	
2008	Nickelodeon Philippines Kids' Choice Awards	Himself (host)	
2009–2010	Hole in the Wall	Yaya and Bianca	
2009–2010	Bitoy's Showwwtime	Himself (host)	
2010	Diz Iz It	Himself (judge)	
2010–2011	Bantatay	Teacher (voice)	
2010–present	Pepito Manaloto	Pepito Manaloto	Director (since 2021)
2012	Pare & Pare	Himself (host)	
2013	Killer Karaoke: Pinoy Naman	Himself (host)	
2015	Sabado Badoo	Himself	
2016–2018	Lip Sync Battle Philippines	Himself (host)	
2017–2022	Wowowin	Himself (host)	
2018	Sarap Diva	Himself	
2019	Dear Uge	Himself	
2023	Voltes V: Legacy	Octo-1 (voice)	
2023	Walang Matigas na Pulis sa Matinik na Misis	Hugo "Utak" Salazar	
2023	It's Showtime	Himself (guest performer with Manilyn Reynes)	
2026	Family Feud	Himself (guest host)	

=== Films ===
Year	Title	Role	Notes
1991	Banana Split	Unknown	
1992	Ano Ba Yan	Unknown	
1993	Ano Ba Yan 2	Unknown	
1993	Mama's Boys	Unknown	
1994	O-Ha! Ako Pa!	Jack	
1994	Biboy Banal: Pagganti ko, tapos kayo!	Ching	
1994	Manolo en Michelle	Unknown	
1995	Isko Adventures in Animasia	Unknown	
1996	Rubberman	Bitoy	
1996	Siyempre Ikaw Lang... Ang Syota Kong Imported	Kevin	
1997	Halik ng Bampira	Unknown	
1997	Bitoy Ang Itawag Mo Sa Akin	Bitoy	
1998	Anting-anting	Unknown	
1998	Sinaktan Mo Ang Puso Ko	Miguel	
1999	D' Sisters:Nuns of the Above	Michael	
2002	Kwentong Kayumanggi	Narrator	
2002	Bestman: 4 Better, Not 4 Worse	Joey	
2003	Lastikman	Junee Lee	
2004	Enteng Kabisote: Okay Ka Fairy Ko, The Legend	Itim	
2006	Enteng Kabisote 3: Okay Ka Fairy Ko... The Legend Goes on and on and on	Unknown	
2007	Paraiso: Tatlong Kuwento ng Pag-asa	Didoy	
2008	Urduja	KutKut	
2008	Dayo	Narsi	
2009	Yaya and Angelina: The Spoiled Brat Movie	Rosalinda "Yaya" Lucero	
2012	Boy Pick-Up: The Movie	MC Bits	
2012	D' Kilabots Pogi Brothers Weh?!	Traffic Enforcer	
2019	Family History	Alex Dela Cruz	Director
2021	Mang Jose	Kumander Andres	
2023	Voltes V: Legacy – The Cinematic Experience	Octo-1 (voice)	
2026	Ella Arcangel: Awit ng Pangil at Kuko	Mimiw	

== Awards and nominations ==
Year	Awards	Category	Nominated work	Results	Ref.
1998	Awit Awards	Song of the Year	"Sinaktan Mo Ang Puso Ko"	Won	
1998	PMPC Star Awards for TV	Best Comedy Actor		Won	
2000	PMPC Star Awards for TV	Best Comedy Actor	Bubble Gang	Won	
2001	Awit Awards	Best Novelty Song	"Ilong" (with Bob M. Guzman, and Larry Chua)	Won	
2001	Asian Television Awards	Best Performance by an Actor		Won	
2003	PMPC Star Awards for TV	Best Comedy Actor (tied with Ogie Alcasid)		Won	
2005	Malacañang	The Outstanding Young Man (TOYM) Award		Won	
2006	Asian Television Awards	Best Comedy Performance by an Actor		Won	
2006	Awit Awards	Best Novelty Recording	"Hindi Ako Bakla"	Nominated	
2006	Awit Awards	Best Dance Recording	"Hindi Ako Bakla"	Nominated	
2007	Asian Television Awards	Best Comedy Performance by an Actor		Nominated	
2007	MYX Music Awards	Favorite MYX Celebrity VJ		Won	
2007	MYX Music Awards	Favorite Male Artist		Nominated	
2008	PMPC Star Awards for TV	Best Comedy Actor		Nominated	
2009	1st MTRCB TV Awards	Best Actor	Bubble Gang	Won	
2009	Asian Television Awards	Best Comedy Performance by an Actor	Bubble Gang	Nominated	
2010	Asian Television Awards	Best Comedy Performance by an Actor		Nominated	
2010	Reader's Digest Asia	Reader's Digest "Philippines' Most Trusted Individuals of 2010 (comedian and television host category)		Included	
2011	Asian Television Awards	Best Comedy Performance by an Actor	Pepito Manaloto	Nominated	
2011	FMTM Award	Top TV Series Senior Artists		Included	
2011	Golden Screen TV Awards	Outstanding Performance by an Actor in a Gag or Comedy Program		Nominated	
2012|	Asian Television Awards	Best Comedy Performance by an Actor	Bubble Gang	Nominated	
2012|	Golden Screen TV Awards	Outstanding Performance by an Actor in a Gag or Comedy Program		Nominated	
2012|	26th PMPC Star Awards for Television	Best Comedy Actor		Nominated	
2013	Asian Television Awards	Best Comedy Performance by an Actor		Nominated	
2013	Golden Screen TV Awards	Outstanding Performance by an Actor in a Gag or Comedy Program		Nominated	
2013	Pillars of Hope Awards	Eton Pillar of Hope for Entertainment TV		Won	
2013	27th PMPC Star Awards for Television	Best Comedy Actor	Bubble Gang	Won	
2014	Golden Screen TV Awards	Outstanding Performance by an Actor in a Gag / Comedy Program		Won	
2014	28th PMPC Star Awards for Television	Best Comedy Actor		Nominated	
2015	Asian Television Awards	Best Comedy Performance by an Actor	Pepito Manaloto	Nominated	
2015	Golden Screen TV Awards	Outstanding Performance by an Actor in a Gag / Comedy Program	Pepito Manaloto	Won	
2015	PMPC Star Awards for TV	Best Comedy Actor	Pepito Manaloto	Nominated	
2020	MYX Music Awards	MYX Celebrity VJ of the Year		Nominated	
