= Curtismith =

- Born: Mito Sibal Fabie; December 1993 (age 32); Philippines
- Genres: Indie hip-hop, R&B
- Instrument: Vocals
- Years active: 2015–present
- Labels: Ideal, Careless, Logiclub, Pool Records
- Spouse: Leila Alcasid (m. 2025)
- Website: soundcloud.com/curtismith

Mito Sibal Fabie (born 1993), known professionally as Curtismith, is a Filipino indie singer, rapper and songwriter. He is best known for his debut mixtape Ideal in 2015, and his EPs Failing Forward (released in 2016) and Soully Yours (released in 2017). He released his debut album Museo in 2021.

He was featured on various music festivals and other events, including Wanderland Music and Arts Festival in 2016. He was also featured on Kiana Valenciano's hit single "Does She Know". In 2017, he was included in a collaboration project by Coca-Cola called Coke Studio PH with Noel Cabangon.

== Early life ==
Mito Fabie is the son of cinematographer Miguel Fabie III and former Mega editor-in-chief Carla Sibal. He grew up an only child. He started making music when he was 14 years old, as a way of expressing himself. His father died when he was 15 and his mother left for the US when he was 17 years old.

== Career ==
Curtismith took inspiration for his alias "Curtismith" after seeing a billboard of Anne Curtis. He took the name to "have people like my music for what it was other than how I looked or who I was". He first joined the music collective Logiclub, which also had local artist crwn as one of their members. In September 2015, Curtismith dropped his first mixtape, Ideal, which featured other local artists such as crwn and Similarobjects. It was distributed for free, and he soon started gaining attention of its success, with praise for his flow and lyricism.

In 2016, Curtismith performed at the Wanderland Music and Arts Festival. He then spoke at a TedxTalk in the Philippines. He also got to perform in front of Richard Branson when he came to the country for a forum. Before the following year, he founded his own record label, Ideal Records.

Curtismith released his second EP in 2017, Soully Yours, about a toxic relationship and how he got out of that relationship. He was then included in a collaboration project by Coca-Cola called Coke Studio PH with Noel Cabangon. He also featured on "Does She Know" by Kiana V and "Devil" by The Morning Episodes which also featured Leanne from Leanne & Naara. In December of that year, he performed at the Wonderfruit Festival in Thailand.

In 2019, Curtismith signed with indie label Careless Music, which was owned by James Reid. He released a single that year, "Soju". He also featured on Kiana V's solo album. In December of that year, he and Reid performed at the Overpass Music Festival in California. In 2020, he performed at the Smart Gigafest Virtual Concert. He also collaborated with the Department of Tourism on the tourism ad "Abakada". He then left the label as he wanted more creative freedom.

Curtismith then signed with indie label Pool Records, which was founded by crwn. On July 30, 2021, he released his debut album, Museo, which featured the single "Downtown as Fruits". He released it in partnership with the Pintô Art Museum, where he held a multisensory exhibition featuring local artists as a visual interpretation of his album. He also featured on PARADISE RISING's compilation album Semilucent 2, with his collaboration with CA Christian Alexander "Black Hearts". In 2023, he collaborated with Kiana V once again on "I Want To Be Here”, a song advocating for mental health. He also released the single "Night Run". In 2024, he featured on crwn's Séance album.

== Artistry ==
Curtismith is influenced by Western music. These include Drake, Kendrick Lamar, Kid Cudi, J. Cole, Joey Bada$$, and the band The Internet. Specifically, Lamar's albums Section 80 and To Pimp a Butterfly are very influential to him. Frank Ocean is also an influence to him for his "soulful music", which he wants to branch out to.

Although hip hop is known as a socially conscious genre, Curtismith's songs focus more on feelings of "hopes, dreams, ideals, and frustrations" more than setting a "political agenda" or sounding "street". He uses his songs to express his situation in that moment in time. His EP Soully Yours focused on infatuation and heartbreak. When producing music, he focuses on the beat first. He also tries to explore other genres aside from hip hop, as seen in his collaboration with Cabangon. One of those genres is jazz, as it has influenced his earlier works.

== Other ventures ==
In 2016, Curtismith was announced as the brand ambassador for the clothing brand Human. He was a major part of their marketing campaign alongside model-athlete Maureen Schrijvers. In the 2020s, he picked up a day job working in publishing to support his music.

Curtismith is an advocate for fighting Online Sexual Exploitation of Children (OSEC), working with non-government organizations on this issue. He also has a feeding program for children. He is also an advocate for mental health.

== Personal life ==
Since 2019, Curtismith has dated Leila Alcasid, the eldest daughter of OPM singer Ogie Alcasid. In September 2024, Alcasid announced their engagement, and the two married in May 2025 in Sydney, Australia.

Curtismith is friends with Congressman Sandro Marcos, grandson of dictator Ferdinand Marcos, as they had known each other since high school. Their friendship has caused netizens to label him a "Marcos apologist". He debunked those claims with a diss track aimed at them.

== Discography ==
=== Studio albums ===
- Museo (2021)

=== EPs ===
- Failing Forward (2016)
- Soully Yours (2017)
- Dining Table (2019)

=== Mixtapes ===
- Ideal (2015)

=== Singles ===
- "LDR"
- "Splash"
- "Soju"
- "Downtown as Fruits"

=== As a featured artist ===
- "Does She Know" (song by Kiana Valenciano)
- "This Is Our Life Now" (song by Sleep Talker)
- "Devil" (song by The Morning Episodes and Leanne)
- "Black Hearts" (song by PARADISE RISING and CA Christian Alexander)
- "Keep it Secret" (song by Kiana V)
- "Nothing to Do" (song by Claudia Barretto)
- "I Want To Be Here” (song by Kiana V and Nix Damn P)
- "Rooftops in Paris" (song by crwn)
