= That's My Bae =

Filipino dance group

- Years active: 2015–2019
- Labels: Triple A Management and GMA Network
- Past members: JV Suzara; Gab Bayan; Jon Timmons; Kenneth Medrano; Joel Palencia; Tommy Peñaflor; Miggy Tolentino; Kim Last
- Website: https://www.facebook.com/EBThatsMyBae/

That's My Bae (also known as EB Baes, TMB or Trops) was a Filipino dance group formed in the That's My Bae: "Twerk It" Dance Contest segment of the noontime variety show Eat Bulaga!, and officially debuted on August 24, 2015, and officially disbanded in May 2019. The group is composed of six members: Kim Last, Kenneth Medrano, Joel Palencia, Tommy Peñaflor, Jon Timmons and Miggy Tolentino. Originally, it was a seven-piece group (with Gab Bayan who left the group in 2015 and was replaced by JV Suzara but who, later, also left in 2016).

== Career ==
=== 2015: That's My Bae: "Twerk It" Dance Contest and line-up changes ===
On July 6, 2015, Eat Bulaga! launched a new segment called That's My Bae: "Twerk It" Dance Contest hosted by Sam Y.G. and Alden Richards. It is a dance contest for male contestants who are referred to as "baes," a slang word for "baby/babe as a term of endearment. The contestants dance to the 2014 hit single "Twerk It Like Miley" by Brandon Beal to showcase their talent and looks. The daily winners underwent a series of elimination rounds until only seven contestants remained in the grand finals of the competition. The seven grand finalists were Gab Bayan, Kim Last, Kenneth Medrano, Joel Palencia, Tommy Peñaflor, Jon Timmons, and Miggy Tolentino.

In August 2015, Kenneth Medrano was named as the grand winner of the competition. Subsequently, Medrano and the six other grand finalists were regularly seen on Eat Bulaga! as a dance group now known as That's My Bae. The name of their group was taken directly from the title of the segment from which they were discovered. To further give them exposure, That's My Bae was given their own segment entitled ATM with the Baes. At this point, they were considered as a mainstay dance group in Eat Bulaga!.

The group was still composed of seven members until the quiet departure of Gab Bayan in December 2015. Bayan left the group in order to return to Far Eastern University and to focus on his studies. Without any formal announcement, JV Suzara, a contestant in That's My Bae: "Twerk It" Dance Contest who finished as a semi-finalist, was added to the group as a replacement.

=== 2016–2019: JV's departure, Acting ventures, concert, first anniversary ===
After the end of ATM with the Baes, That's My Bae appeared in several other segments of Eat Bulaga!, including Hotline Bae, Dancing in Tandem, and Kalyeserye. Kenneth Medrano was even given a minor role as Peping during the flashback retelling of Nidora and Anselmo's love story in Kalyeserye. The members of That's My Bae were also included in AlDub's wedding entourage for Kalyeserye.

In February 2016, JV Suzara decided to leave the group after his short stint as a member. Suzara then formed his own group called Bae Alert, an all-male dance group composed of other semi-finalists from the That's My Bae: "Twerk It" Dance Contest segment of Eat Bulaga!. Meanwhile, That's My Bae continued on with only six members.

In March 2016, the members of the group were included in the cast of the "Walang Kapalit" episode of the annual Eat Bulaga! Lenten Special presentation. Medrano was given a main role, while the other members made cameo appearances during the episode. Although Medrano had a supporting role in Buena Familia, his participation in the Lenten special was his first portrayal as a lead role. In June 2016, Medrano starred in the morning drama series Calle Siete, and was paired with showbiz newcomer Taki Saito. Soon, Saito was regularly performing with That's My Bae on Eat Bulaga!. Meanwhile, Kim Last was added as a regular cast member of the Sunday comedy-variety show Sunday PinaSaya.

On October 8, 2016, was declared by Eat Bulaga! as "Bae Day" in order to celebrate the anniversary of the formation of That's My Bae. On that day, Eat Bulaga! also announced that the group will be given their own television show entitled Trops with Taki Saito. This is the debut television series of the group. They will also be accompanied by showbiz newcomer, Toni Aquino, daughter of Eat Bulaga! host Ruby Rodriguez. Trops is That's My Bae's first acting career as a group. The show premiered on October 24, 2016. It is produced by TAPE, Inc. and broadcast on GMA Network.

On December 3, 2016, Eat Bulaga! announced that the group with Taki Saito will be having its first ever concert on December 16, 2016, in SM City North EDSA Sky Dome. However, due to an undeclared reason, the concert was cancelled. The concert was rescheduled on March 24, 2017, and is titled #TropsGoals: Party with the Baes.

=== 2019: Disbandment of the group ===
In an interview with Palencia, one of the group members, he reiterated how grateful the group was to APT Management and Eat Bulaga!. He said, the dance group was not terminated from the noontime show. As the year of 2019 unfolded, they were several segments on the show; where the group was not needed. The exposure of the group dwindled down with time; as they continued to appear as guest stars in the noontime show.

In May 2019, the group was officially disbanded.

== Members ==
The group has been disbanded in May 2019.

=== Main Members ===
Kim Last

Kim Michael Last (born January 20, 1997), or simply known as Kim, is a British-Filipino born and raised in Kings Cross, London. He immigrated to the Philippines when he was 17 years old. Last was a secondary school graduate studying government politics at Chelsea Academy in London prior to joining the competition. He also had a short stint as a backup dancer for Morissette Amon and KZ Tandingan, and was about to become a personal trainer in boxing until he joined That's My Bae: "Twerk It" Dance Contest. After becoming a well-known member of Eat Bulaga!s in-house dance group, Last also became a regular cast member of the noontime comedy-variety show Sunday PinaSaya. Last is the youngest member of the group. Last was returned from England and retires from show business.

Kenneth Medrano

Kenneth Earl Gesulga Medrano (born May 9, 1991), or more simply known as Kenneth, is from Cebu City, Cebu. Prior to joining the Eat Bulaga! segment, Medrano was a Hotel and Restaurant Management junior at the University of Southern Philippines Foundation. He also had a part-time job as a bartender and a model, but is best known for his viral Dubsmash videos. Medrano gained fame after becoming the grand winner of the That's My Bae: "Twerk It" Dance Contest segment of Eat Bulaga!. Buena Familia gave Medrano his first breakthrough acting role as Pacoy Alvero.

Joel Palencia

Joel Palencia (born March 7, 1992), or simply known as Joel, is from Antipolo, Rizal. Prior to joining That's My Bae, he was a junior pursuing a Tourism Management degree at the Antipolo branch of Our Lady of Fatima University. Palencia joined male beauty contests before trying his luck in That's My Bae: "Twerk It" Dance Contest. One of his most promising wins was Ginoong Antipolo in 2015. He represented Antipolo in other cities until he was banned because he was known as a winner already. After being advised to try television, Palencia joined That's My Bae: "Twerk It" Dance Contest.

Tommy Peñaflor

Tomas Peñaflor II (born February 12, 1993), or better known as Tommy, is from Dinalupihan, Bataan. He is a Bachelor of Science in Radiologic Technology graduate in the Perpetual Help College of Manila, but opted to dance and to act his way to a career in show business. He first joined and finished as one of the Top 15 semi-finalists in the 2014 Gandang Lalake contest on ABS-CBN's It's Showtime before joining Eat Bulaga!s dance competition. In That's My Bae: "Twerk It" Dance Contest, Peñaflor was eliminated in the weekly finals of the competition, but was given another chance as a contender in the wildcard round.

Peñaflor won the title, Man of the World in Mister Filipinos Pageant in 2019. His family owns a spa and a gas refill station business.

He's in a relationship with his non-showbiz girlfriend.

Jon Timmons

Jonathan Mark Cabico Timmons (born February 21, 1991), or simply known as Jon, is a Filipino American born and raised in Los Angeles, California. He was an AA Science graduate at El Camino College in Los Angeles before joining That's My Bae. In California, he also had a part-time job as a cashier at a mall and then at a pet store. Timmons was simply visiting the Philippines when he joined That's My Bae: "Twerk It" Dance Contest to try his luck in the Philippine showbiz industry. After becoming part of That's My Bae, he decided to stay in the Philippines. Timmons is the oldest member of the group.

Miggy Tolentino

Luis Miguel Evangelista Tolentino (born April 20, 1996), more simply known as Miggy, is from Caloocan, Metro Manila. Prior to That's My Bae, he was a sophomore pursuing a Bachelor of Science in Business Administration (BSBA) degree at the Universidad de Manila. Before joining That's My Bae: "Twerk It" Dance Contest, Tolentino guested in some shows while endorsing perfumes and skin care products.

=== Former members ===
Gab Bayan

Jose Gabriel Garra Bayan (born July 4, 1996), simply known as Gab, is from Pasig, Rizal. He was a sophomore at Far Eastern University before he joined That's My Bae: "Twerk It" Dance Contest, in which he was a grand finalist. He then became one of the seven original members of the show's in-house dance group That's My Bae. However, Bayan left the group a few months later in order to return to Far Eastern University and to focus on his studies. He was a guest in Eat Bulaga's segment Boom! as a color blue choicer.

JV Suzara

John Vincent Suzara (born March 29, 1996), or simply known as JV, is from Bacolod City, Negros Occidental. Suzara joined That's My Bae: "Twerk It" Dance Contest, but was eliminated in the semi-final round. After Gab's departure from That's My Bae, he was added to the group as a replacement. However, Suzara also decided to leave That's My Bae a few months later to form his own group called Bae Alert, an all-male performance group composed of other semi-finalists from the That's My Bae: "Twerk It" Dance Contest segment of Eat Bulaga!. on June 10, 2017, JV Kiss and Hugs Miggy in the Hakot Pa More! Segment. On June 12, 2017, JV Hugs Krystal Reyes, Paul Cham & Taki Saito during Hakot Pa More!

== Concerts ==
  1. TropsGoal: Party With The Bae (2017)

== Television ==
Year	Title	Role	Notes
2014	Trenderas	Jon Timmons as Host of The Next Pinoy Pop Icon	Cameo appearance on TV5
2015–2019	Eat Bulaga!	themselves Gab as Guest from BOOM!	Contestants of That's My Bae: "Twerk It" Dance Contest; In-house male dance group
2015	Wagas: Langit at Lupa	Kenneth Medrano as George†	First anthology series with his love partner Kylie Padilla as Belle on GMA News TV
2015	Ismol Family	Kenneth Medrano as Benjamin	First comedy series' guest appearance
2015	The Half Sisters	Kenneth Medrano as Atty. Rodel Dimaano	Special participation
2015	Alisto!	Kenneth Medrano; Tommy Peñaflor; Kim Last as themselves	Episode guest
2015–2016	Buena Familia	Kenneth Medrano as Pacoy Alvero†	Medrano's first major acting role (antagonist, later protagonist)
2015–2016	Juan Tamad	Jon Timmons as TomDen Rodriguez; Joel Palencia as Eddie Boy Jones; Tommy Peñaflor as Mark Rehas; Kim Last as Jepoy Bagalihog; Miggy Tolentino as Dan Ragondon; Gab Bayan as Rocco Nachino	First TV comedy series' guest appearance
2016	Kalyeserye	Themselves as The Models in Yaya Dub's fashion show Jon Timmons and Joel Palencia as Santa Bae; Kim Last as Santa Bae / Camilo (Anselmo's friend); Kenneth Medrano as Santa Bae / Pepito (Anselmo's cousin and neighbor)	Minor characters / Special participation
2016	Eat Bulaga! Lenten Special: Walang Kapalit	Kenneth Medrano as Carlo; Miggy Tolentino, Joel Palencia and Kim Last as Carlo's friends	Main role for Kenneth Medrano; Other members made cameo appearances
2016	Eat Bulaga! Lenten Special: God Gave Me You	Tommy Peñaflor and Jon Timmons as Flight Attendants	Cameo appearance
2016	Calle Siete	Kenneth Medrano as Jonas Delloso	First family comedy drama series
2016–2019	Sunday PinaSaya	themselves Kim Last as co-host	Performers
2016–2017	Trops	Kenneth Medrano as Kenneth Mercado; Miggy Tolentino as Miguelito "Miggy" Tolentino; Joel Palencia as Joel Santos; Jon Timmons as Jonathan Masson; Tommy Peñaflor as Tommy Fernando; Kim Last as Kim Michael Park	That's My Bae's first television series with Taki Saito as Taki Masson (Jon's sister); Together with Toni Aquino, Krystal Reyes and Shaira Mae dela Cruz
2017	Magpakailanman: #LoveKnowsNoAge: The Mitch Tandingan and Gil Moreno Jr. Millennial Love Story	Kenneth Medrano as Gil Moreno Jr.†	Second anthology series with his love partner Ash Ortega as Mitch Tandingan
2017	Eat Bulaga! Lenten Special: Pagpapatawad	Kenneth Medrano as Carlo de la Rosa	Eat Bulaga!'s Second Lenten Presentation
2017	Eat Bulaga! Lenten Special: Prinsesa	Joel Palencia as Ato; Tommy Peñaflor as Gary	Eat Bulaga!'s Second Lenten Presentation
2017	Eat Bulaga! Lenten Special: Mansyon	Miggy Tolentino as Migoy Neruda (Yayen's younger brother); Jon Timmons as James Marcelo and Kim Last as Nikko Bragancia (Yayen's college schoolmate)	Eat Bulaga!'s Second Lenten Presentation
2017	D' Originals	Kim Last as Dan†	Special guest / Supporting Cast
2017	iBilib	Themselves	Guest iBilibers with Taki Saito, Krystal Reyes and Toni Aquino
2017	Magpakailanman: Reyna ng Tubig: The Jay Kummer "Dodoy" Teberio Story	Kenneth Medrano as Alvin	Lead Role
2017	Hay, Bahay!	Miggy Tolentino as Migs; Kim Last as Jimboy	Episode Guest with Taki Saito as Tami
2017/2018	Pepito Manaloto	Miggy Tolentino as Pitoy; Joel Palencia as Jessie; Tommy Peñaflor as TV seller	Episode Guest
2018–2023	Iskoolmates	Gab Bayan as host	Youth-Oriented Debate Program
2019	Umagang Kay Ganda	Tommy Peñaflor as contestant	Segment: Videokray
2019	Wagas: Throwback Pag-Ibig	Joel Palencia as Eric	
2019	Beautiful Justice	Kim Last as Denver Jacinto	
2020–present	Rise and Shine Pilipinas	Gab Bayan as host	Morning Show
2020–2021	Ate ng Ate Ko	Kim Last as Patrick Sevilla	Last's first drama show and television project with TV5
2022–present	TiktoClock	Kim Last, Miggy Tolentino, and Jon Timmons	first TV comeback after 4-year disbandment GMA 7

== Movies ==
Year	Movie Title	Role(s)	Notes	Film Production
2018	Glorious	Tommy Peñaflor as Sam	Supporting Role	Dreamscape Digital Production
2015	My Bebe Love: #KiligPaMore	Themselves	Group cameo appearance	OctoArts Films; M-Zet Productions; APT Entertainment; GMA Films; MEDA Productions
2015	Wang Fam	Jon Timmons as Boarder	Supporting role	Viva Films
2014	Talk Back and You're Dead	Joel Palencia as Mr. Pendleton's Student	Cameo appearance	Viva Films
2013	Girl, Boy, Bakla, Tomboy	Jon Timmons as Bartender	Cameo appearance	Viva Films

== Awards ==
Year	Award	Category	Result	Ref.
2017	48th GMMSF Box-Office Entertainment Awards	Most Promising Recording/Performing Group	Won	
