= Bawal na Game Show =

2020–21 Philippine defunct television game show

- Title card
- Genre: Game show
- Created by: Jeffrey Tabason
- Developed by: Archangel Media
- Written by: Jeffrey Tabason; Don Santella; Robin Sison
- Directed by: Linnet Zurbano
- Presented by: Paolo Ballesteros; Wally Bayola
- Narrated by: Ramcy Tirona
- Theme music composer: Ariel Bryan Aquino
- Opening theme: "Bawal na Game Show" by Ariel Bryan Aquino
- Ending theme: "Bawal na Game Show" by [instrumental]
- Country of origin: Philippines
- Original language: Filipino
- No. of episodes: 97

Production
- Executive producers: Robert P. Galang; Adrian Raphael V. Santos
- Producers: Michael B. Tuviera; Jojo C. Oconer
- Production locations: TV5 Media Center, Mandaluyong, Metro Manila, Philippines
- Camera setup: Multiple-camera setup
- Running time: 60 minutes (with commercials)
- Production companies: Archangel Media; Cignal Entertainment

Original release
- Network: TV5
- Release: February 10, 2020 – July 30, 2021

Bawal na Game Show (transl. Forbidden Game Show) is a Philippine television game show broadcast by TV5. Hosted by Paolo Ballesteros and Wally Bayola, it aired on the network's TodoMax Primetime Singko line up and worldwide on Kapatid Channel from February 10, 2020 to July 30, 2021, and was replaced by Sing Galing!.

== Final hosts ==
Final hosts

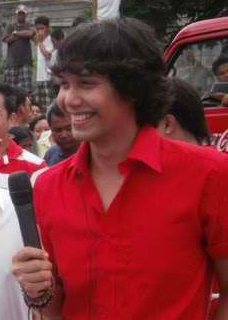
Paolo Ballesteros

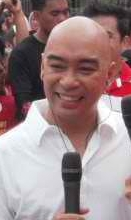
Wally Bayola

- Paolo Ballesteros as Barby Ghorl
- Wally Bayola as Bebe Ghorl
- Echo Calingal as Birit Ghorl

=== Featuring ===
- Brion James Lim as Bawal Officer Byron
- Gringo Baring, Jr. as Bawal Officer Gringo
- Mark Benson Pelota as Bawal Officer MacMac
- Richard Jonathan de Claro as Bawal Officer RJ
- Kim Whamos Cruz as Pambansang Poser Whendell Wamos
- Ricky Luzano as himself
- Madam Jinky P. as himself

== Format ==
Four contestants, deemed as "pasaway" compete in challenging parlor games in order to become the "Pasa-wais" of the day and have the chance to win the daily jackpot. The three elimination and lone jackpot rounds consist of the following Bawal, or don't challenges:

- Bawal ang Mag-Emote - Don't emote; four contestants test the flexibility and balance that they stood in the face booth where there were emotion icons behind them. the emotion icons will advance behind them whenever they are caught by hanging.
- Bawal ang Lumusot - Don't infiltrate; three contestants try to jumping some of the boxes selected by the color randomizer at the signal of the hosts.
- Bawal ang Slow - Don't slow; two remaining contestants rolls the number dices to find out how many times they must do this before they can run over the obstacle cones carrying their marker chips. they put the chips on the giant tic-tac-toe floor. they have to go back to the starting point where they will again throw the dice do the task and run over the obstacle cones.
- Bawal ang Sumuko - Don't quit; the remaining contestant, or "pasa-wais" completes the three various challenges as they navigate the plexiglass maze in the jackpot round.

The winning contestant, or "Pasa-wais", receives P50,000, while the "Certified Pasaways" each receive a consolation prize of P5,000.

=== Former ===
- Bawal ang Ma-Fall - Don't let it fall; four contestants try to keep each of their objects from falling to the ground while imitating the Pambansang Poser's various body poses and expressions.
- Bawal ang Da-Moves - Don't move; three contestants try to endure sitting still despite the surrounding distractions they are all subjected to involving the five senses.
- Bawal ang Sablay - Don't get the answer wrong; two remaining contestants answer questions in wacky, physical activities.

== Episodes ==
Episode	Airdate	Guests
1 (Note: This episode marks the first episode of the show.)	August 15, 2020	Kira Balinger, Heaven Peralejo, Maika Rivera, Empress Schuck
2	August 18, 2020	Jameson Blake, Joshua Colet, Luke Conde, Miko Raval
3	August 20, 2020	Mhyca Bautista, Louise Bolton, Jopay Paguia, Mia Pangyarihan
4	August 22, 2020	Jayson Gainza, Pepe Herrera, DJ Jhai Ho, Jeffrey Tam
5	August 25, 2020	Sheree, Andrea del Rosario, Gwen Garci, Zara Lopez
6	August 27, 2020	Ryan Arana, Joe Devance, Sol Mercado, Chris Newsome
7	August 29, 2020	Bernadette Allyson, Bobby Andrews, Angelu de Leon, Michael Flores
8	September 1, 2020	Jheck Dionela, Marck Espejo, Alfred Valbuena, Amanda Villanueva
9	September 3, 2020	Rico Almirañez, Marvin Arquero, Jayson Jayari, Jeffrey Vinuya
10	September 5, 2020	Richo Bautista, Kenzo Ortiz Jr., Ryan Viray, Jomar Yee
11	September 8, 2020	Nelson Alapriz, Belly Joe Cristo, Enrico Lamagna, Alex Revilla
12	September 10, 2020	Benjamin Hipolito Jr., Adrian Pre, Dennise Roque, Christopher Samson
13	September 12, 2020	Clem Castro, Piwee Polintan, Duncan Ramos, Jinky Vidal
14	September 15, 2020	Bimbo Daguman, John Rey Garcia, Meldred Garcia, Jingky Lucero
15	September 17, 2020	Madz Aguilar, Malou Martillo, Ruth Melida, Sasa Radovan
16	September 19, 2020	Wilma Doesnt, John Lapus, Dennis Padilla, Giselle Sanchez
17	September 22, 2020	Jenny Abadicio, Allysa Bautista, Kim Calinawan, Emil Caranza
18	September 24, 2020	Sofia De Guia, Thania Panilag, Angel Pintor, Dimple Tan
19	September 26, 2020	Nina Ricci Alagao-Flores, Pinky Amador, Mon Confiado, Ryan Eigenmann
20	September 29, 2020	Jan Capacio, Mon Papellero, Kean Ramos, Ax Valerio
21	October 1, 2020	Mona Andales, JM Dumaran, JM Joven, Lennix Purificacion
22	October 3, 2020	Geneva Cruz, Patricia Javier, Aubrey Miles, Regine Tolentino
23	October 6, 2020	Tim Albelda, Joana Balanza, Jack Francisco, Tata Gomera
24	October 8, 2020	Jun Borromeo, Monique Embido, Gia Mendoza, Van Santos
25	October 10, 2020	Kim Last, Kenneth Medrano, Jon Timmons, Miggy Tolentino
26	October 12, 2020	Darla Acutillar, Emon Balancano, Verylight Oliver, Dexter Patente
27	October 13, 2020	Mastafeat Cajuban Jr., Dhuski Angelo, M Zhayt Gabriola, Mhot Mayacyac
28	October 15, 2020	Jennica Garcia-Uytingco, Karel Marquez-Santos, Alex Medina, Felix Roco
29	October 19, 2020	AJ Altea, Hayashi Bon, Makurah Katakura, Marty Reyes
30	October 20, 2020	Doris Diño, Santino Lazo Jr., Vhic Macahilig, Rey Polis
31	October 22, 2020	Marco Alcaraz, Matt Evans, Fabio Ide, Ali Khatibi
32	October 26, 2020	Jonnel Dela Cruz, Carla Gagarino Jr., Edz Ramos, Kenneth Torres
33	October 27, 2020	Em Em Calica, Nick Escalderon, Coco Morillo, Key Siu
34	October 29, 2020	Sharmaine Arnaiz, Ramon Christopher Gutierrez, Migui Moreno, Tina Paner
35	November 2, 2020	Christian Viñas, Lester Gonzales David, Edgar Parado, Rodolfo Gabriel
36	November 3, 2020	Enrique Magsalin Jr., Crisanto Contemplato, Roldan Aldea, Joe Marie Noynay
37	November 5, 2020	Buboy Villar, Krystal Reyes, Joshua Dionisio, Ella Cruz
38	November 9, 2020	Rannie Mabignay, MJ Gonzales, Cel Fidellaga, Beth Velasquez
39	November 10, 2020	Kath Gacutan, Peng Paulino, Patrick dela Cruz, Pepper Licup
40 (Note: This episode marks the last day of Birit Ghorl as a host for Bayola, before being returned on the next episode.)	November 12, 2020	Maxine Medina, Alma Concepcion, Rochelle Barrameda, Maricel Morales
41 (Note: This episode marks Bebe Ghorl's return from the show after being absent in 2 weeks and Echo as a temporary replacement for him.)	November 16, 2020	Miya Delfin, Rene Ellazar, Orange Gentolea, Jay Servito
42	November 17, 2020	Champee Bornilla, Rhey Dulfo, Mack Manao, Ghio Pisigan Jr.
43	November 19, 2020	Sherwin Ordoñez, Jim Salas, Yexel Sebastian, Joshua Zamora
44	November 23, 2020	Oyo Cesar, Bon Joker Javier, Joel Sobretodo, Gary Vergara
45	November 24, 2020	Pat. Greg Galang, Jr., Pat. Lucky Galang, PCpl. Richard Pangilinan, PCpl. Willy Quinto
46	November 26, 2020	Glenda Garcia, Jeffrey Santos, Lovely Rivero, Mel Martinez
47	November 30, 2020	Mark Lili, Jake Sicad, Jessie Cal, Choi Capili Jr.
48	December 1, 2020	Bryan Cabasag, Deng Villafuente, Kachora Lati, Kkwshefu Canedo
49	December 3, 2020	Myke Solomon, Gian Magdangal, Gab Pangilinan, Carla Guevara
50	December 7, 2020	Arianne Bautista, Cai Cortez, JC Tiuseco, Fifth Solomon
51	December 8, 2020	Jayhuan Behagan, Jaythu Behagan, Raymond Pandalan, Raymart Pandalan
52	December 10, 2020	Silver Jackson, Ate Shawie, Zsazing, Krissy Achino
53	December 11, 2020	Evan Diaz, Nanak Flor, Shoogar Gallego, Gelo Luza
54	December 14, 2020	Harold Esiritu, Rolly Banawa, Arts Atutubo Jr., Kaye Catamping
55	December 15, 2020	Jeng Bauto, John Bueno, Byx Almacen, Albert Abelido
56	December 16, 2020	Arvic Tan, Elora Espano, Alex Diaz, Kate Lapuz
57	December 17, 2020	MB Yanong, Arvie Centeno, Lhenie Angel, Alvin Ortega
58	December 18, 2020	Miguel Aquino, Annie dela Cruz, Jion Redona, Marrey Copruz
59	December 21, 2020	Dean Fudotan, Elena Morada, Cardo Viray Jr., Vilna Precioso
60	December 22, 2020	Noel Villarosa, Josche Concepcion, Roderick Villarba, Aldrhey Brozo
61	December 23, 2020	Arch Ylaya, Tubay Roberto, Dadok Agulto, Jun Ignacio Sr.
62	December 24, 2020	Arnell Tamayo, Jan Marini, Jojo Bragais, Teri Onor
63 (Note: Originally decided to air on December 25, 2020)	December 28, 2020	Robin Hanrath, Will Devaughn, Addy Raj, Hideo Madauko
64	December 29, 2020	Maclit Angeles, Jenny dela Torre, Oscki Peralta Jr., Paloma dela Cruz
65	December 30, 2020	Isabelle de Leon, Joem Bascon, Jervy "Patani" Daño, Kris Bernal
66	January 4, 2021	Iya Abainza, Jr., Millin Janna Loria, Japs Secretaria, Miks Maroto
67	January 5, 2021	Mannex Pacquiao, Vannesa Alverez, Mike Mendoza, Jobell Dayrit Sepacio
68	January 6, 2021	Kyo Quijano, Rana Harake, Keith Talens, Makagago Warnakulahewa
69	January 11, 2021	Rancy Acol, LA Alvarado, Jaemie Salvador, Marco Calibra
70	January 12, 2021	Dheng Bermudez, AJ Baring, Julie Guadayo, Edong Crisostomo
71	January 13, 2021	Max Eigenmann, Phoebe Walker, Natalie Hart, Jennifer Lee
72	January 18, 2021	Zyra Vargas, Rennzo Manzon, Angielyn Villareal, Kevin Marinas
73	January 19, 2021	Kebyn Villarino, Nel Pelayo, MJ Ulpindo, Rica Cagungun
74	January 20, 2021	Dawn Chang, Faith Cuneta, Tuesday Vargas, Abby Asistio
75	January 25, 2021	Noel Urbano, Nica Rojo, Yvette Tagura, Pipoh Villavicencio
76	January 26, 2021	MJ Obispo, Jams Blase, Yhana Decena, Quatro San Diego
77	January 27, 2021	Gold Aceron, Timothy Castillo, Angeli Nicole Sanoy, Carlos Dala
78	February 1, 2021	Jella Guevarra, Shan Bautista, Cess Balengbeng, Muymuy Dizon
79	February 2, 2021	Jufor Maranon, CJ Go, Dwine Salvilla, Jana Francisco
80	February 3, 2021	Pin Apin, Dong Purgatorio, Lita Santos, Mack Alhambra
81	February 8, 2021	Vin Abrenica, Boy Ramirez, Keann Johnson, Adrian Alandy
82	February 9, 2021	RR Reyes, Jolits Presco, Boyet dela Rosa, Mutya Ellaga
83	February 10, 2021	Haiza Madrid, Long Mejia, Ellen Adarna, John Estrada
84	February 15, 2021	Remi Von Strombeck, Rej Banks, JM Corder, Clauding Williamson
85	February 16, 2021	Trisha Teodoro, Charisse Daily, Migz Chiu, Jake Enriquez
86	February 17, 2021	Jas Villarama, Xtian Guintivano, Gray Nerona, Therese Lacap
87	February 23, 2021	Ronnie Liang, Alisah Bonaobra, Lance Busa, Sheryn Regis
88	February 25, 2021	Maki Zafra, Ryuji San Juan, Cheyserr Custodio, Janine Saturos
89	March 2, 2021	Aki Torres, Kevin Socoya, Paul Cervantes, Kennedy Nakar
90	March 4, 2021	Epy Quizon, Neil Coleta, Mart Escudero, Gardo Versoza
91	March 9, 2021	Mae Capinpin, Raevin Bonifacio, Haina Sultan, Harvs Sacdalan
92	March 11, 2021	Andrea Noveja, Rhon Caimbon Jr., Kiel Justinano, Jessa Balog
93	March 16, 2021	Aiyana Perlas, Baileys Acot, Jaime Ascalon, Sydney Crespo
94	March 18, 2021	Camille Penaverde, Denmark de Guzman, Pamela Galaraga, Felipe Mendoza Jr.
95	March 23, 2021	Ejay Dimaculangan, Lynn Ronquillo, Iya Malgapo, Jerome Narciso
96	March 25, 2021	Jojo Abellana, Rey Abellana, Vandolph Quizon, Mark Anthony Fernandez
97	March 30, 2021	Vinz Rodriguez, Donna Cato, Donjo Donato, Rhie Ann Reyes

== See also ==
- List of TV5 (Philippine TV network) original programming
- Kapatid Channel
