= Eat Bulaga! Lenten Drama Specials =

Philippine annual TV special

- Title screen (2026)
- Created by: Eat Bulaga!
- Written by: Various
- Directed by: Various
- Starring: Eat Bulaga! stars
- Country of origin: Philippines
- Original language: Tagalog (Filipino)

Production
- Production company: TAPE Inc. (1981–2008, 2014–2019); TVJ Productions, Inc. and Unitel Straight Shooters (since 2024)

Original release
- Network: RPN (1981–1988); ABS-CBN (1989–1994); GMA Network (1995–2008, 2014–2019); TV5 (2024–present)
- Release: April 13, 1981 – present

Eat Bulaga! Lenten Drama Specials is a Philippine television drama anthology by the Philippine noontime show Eat Bulaga! in observance with the Holy Week and broadcast by RPN, ABS-CBN, GMA and TV5. It aired from April 13, 1981 to March 19, 2008. The series is returned from April 14, 2014 to April 17, 2019 and since March 25, 2024. The episodes usually release during the Holy Monday to Holy Wednesday.

== Production ==
The series started in 1981. The first special was directed by Lino Brocka. Each episode featured Eat Bulaga!'s host along with different guests. The series ran until 2008. In an interview with the entertainment website PEP.ph, Malou Choa-Fagar, an executive of TAPE Inc., the former producer of the Eat Bulaga!, said that the series was ended because they felt "there was a saturation of materials" and that " the trend back then was game shows".

The series returned in 2014, featuring the six stories of the winners of Eat Bulaga!'s "Juan For All, All for Juan" segment. It went into hiatus in 2020 due to the COVID-19 pandemic. The series later returned in 2024.

In an interview with PEP.ph, Joey De Leon, one of the series stars, said that the annual series was their "vow [to God]."

== Premise ==
The series features inspirational stories and usually features Christian-related lessons.

== Episodes ==
=== 2014 ===
No.	Title	Directed by	Stars	Original release date
Holy Monday
1	(Filipino: Karugtong ng Puso)	Mark Reyes	Susan Roces, Paolo Ballesteros, Ehra Madrigal and Tito Sotto	April 14, 2014
2	(Filipino: Ilaw Ng Kahapon)	Jun Lana	Julia Clarete, Gladys Reyes, Perla Bautista and Dennis Trillo	April 14, 2014
Holy Tuesday
1	(Filipino: Hakbang sa Pangarap)	Jun Lana	Michael V., Wally Bayola, Bea Binene, Assunta de Rossi and Joey de Leon	April 15, 2014
2	(Filipino: Kulungan Kanlungan)	Gina Alajar	Maricel Soriano, Pia Guanio, Keempee de Leon, Isabelle Daza and BJ Forbes	April 15, 2014
Holy Wednesday
1	(Filipino: Anyo ng Pag-ibig)	Mike Tuviera	Pauleen Luna, Ryan Agoncillo, Jimmy Santos, Ruby Rodriguez, Krystal Reyes and Valerie Weigman	April 16, 2014
2	(Filipino: Pangalawang Bukas)	Bibeth Orteza	Vic Sotto, Jose Manalo, Anjo Yllana and Ryzza Mae Dizon	April 16, 2014

=== 2015 ===
No.	Title	Directed by	Stars	Original release date
Holy Monday
1	(Filipino: Biro ng Kapalaran)	Mark Reyes	Keempee de Leon, Nova Villa, Paolo Ballesteros and Jimmy Santos	March 30, 2015
2	(Filipino: Lukso ng Dugo)	Gina Alajar	Ryzza Mae Dizon, Aiza Seguerra, Pia Guanio, Ricky Davao and Julia Clarete	March 30, 2015
Holy Tuesday
1	(Filipino: Pangako ng Pag-ibig)	Joey Reyes	Pauleen Luna, Rocco Nacino, Jaclyn Jose, Luis Alandy and Anjo Yllana	March 31, 2015
2	(Filipino: Pinagpalang Ama)	Joyce Bernal	Joey de Leon, Jose Manalo, Wally Bayola, Ryan Agoncillo and Pilita Corrales	March 31, 2015
Holy Wednesday
1	(Filipino: Aruga ng Puso)	Joyce Bernal	Marian Rivera, Bianca Umali, Wendell Ramos, Irma Adlawan and Ruby Rodriguez	April 1, 2015
2	(Filipino: Sukli ng Pagmamahal)	Joel Lamangan	Vic Sotto, Allan K., Tito Sotto, Ina Raymundo and Sef Cadayona	April 1, 2015

=== 2016 ===
No.	Title	Directed by	Stars	Original release date
Holy Monday
1	(Filipino: Dalangin Ng Ama)	Gina Alajar	Jimmy Santos, Anjo Yllana, Ryan Agoncillo, Joey de Leon and Andrea Torres	March 21, 2016
2	(Filipino: Kaputol ng Buhay)	Jose Rowel Ikamen	Wally Bayola, Paolo Ballesteros, Jose Manalo, and Maine Mendoza	March 21, 2016
Holy Tuesday
1	(Filipino: Walang Kapalit)	Jun Lana	Allan K., Ruby Rodriguez, Patricia Tumulak and Kenneth Medrano	March 22, 2016
2	(Filipino: Panata)	Jose Javier Reyes	Vic Sotto, Pauleen Luna, Baste, Ryzza Mae Dizon, Danica Sotto, and Oyo Sotto	March 22, 2016
Holy Wednesday
1	"God Gave Me You"	Joyce Bernal	Maine Mendoza, Alden Richards, Jake Ejercito, Jose Manalo, Wally Bayola, Michael de Mesa and Ciara Sotto	March 23, 2016

=== 2017 ===
No.	Title	Directed by	Stars	Original release date
Holy Monday
1	(Filipino: Inay)	Joey Reyes	Paolo Ballesteros, Ai-Ai delas Alas, Allan K and Sinon Loresca	April 10, 2017
2	(Filipino: Kapatid)	Joyce Bernal	Alden Richards, Ryan Agoncillo, Ruby Rodriguez, Pia Guanio, and Jerald Napoles	April 10, 2017
Holy Tuesday
1	(Filipino: Pagpapatawad)	Gina Alajar	Lorna Tolentino, Kenneth Medrano, Taki, Patricia Tumulak and Baste	April 11, 2017
2	(Filipino: Prinsesa)	Mike Tuviera	Maine Mendoza, Ryzza Mae Dizon, Anjo Yllana, Tommy Penaflor, Joel Palencia and Wally Bayola	April 11, 2017
Holy Wednesday
1	(Filipino: Mansyon)	Linnet Zurbano	Tito Sotto, Jose Manalo, Jimmy Santos, Kim Last, Miggy Tolentino, Jon Timmons, Jake Ejercito and Barbie Forteza	April 12, 2017
2	(Filipino: Kaibigan)	Joel Lamangan	Vic Sotto, Joey de Leon, Bianca Umali and Kim Rodriguez	April 12, 2017

=== 2018 ===
No.	Title	Directed by	Stars	Original release date
Holy Monday
1	"My Carinderia Girl"	Linnet Zurbano	Ruby Rodriguez, Kenneth Medrano, Pauleen Luna, Luane Dy, Sinon Loresca, Tommy Penaflor and Kim Last	March 26, 2018
2	(Filipino: Haligi ng Pangarap)	Adolfo Alix Jr.	Alden Richards, Tito Sotto, Joey de Leon and Tirso Cruz III	March 26, 2018
Holy Tuesday
1	"A Daughter's Love"	Ricky Davao	Ryzza Mae Dizon, Nora Aunor, Pia Guanio, Julia Gonowon, Lui Manansala and Ana Roces	March 27, 2018
2	(Filipino: Pamilya)	Real Florido	Ryan Agoncillo, Paolo Ballesteros, Baste, Jake Ejercito and Ronaldo Valdez	March 27, 2018
Holy Wednesday
1	(Filipino: Hating Kapatid)	L.A. Madridejos	Jose Manalo and Wally Bayola	March 28, 2018
2	(Filipino: Taray ni Tatay)	Adolfo Alix Jr.	Vic Sotto and Maine Mendoza with Allan K, Jimmy Santos, Anjo Yllana, Rita Avila and Kendoll	March 28, 2018

=== 2019 ===
No.	Title	Directed by	Stars	Original release date
Holy Monday
1	(Cebuano: Bulawan)	Real Florido	Ryan Agoncillo, Pia Guanio, Baste, Kenneth Medrano, Wally Bayola, Alden Richards and Joey De Leon	April 15, 2019
Holy Tuesday
1	(Filipino: Byaheng Broken Hearted)	Ice Idanan	Ruby Rodriguez, Anjo Yllana, Maureen, Maine Mendoza and Paolo Ballesteros	April 16, 2019
Holy Wednesday
1	Transliteration: "Ikigai" (Japanese: いきがい)	Ricky Davao	Pauleen Luna-Sotto, Allan K., Jimmy Santos, Luane Dy, Ryzza Mae Dizon, Jose Manalo and Vic Sotto	April 17, 2019

=== 2024 ===
No.	Title	Directed by	Stars	Original release date
Holy Monday
1	(Filipino: Selda ng Kahapon)	Gino M. Santos	Joey de Leon, Allan K, Paolo Ballesteros, Wally Bayola and Carren Eistrup	March 25, 2024
Holy Tuesday
1	"Love Thy Neighbor"	Gino M. Santos	Tito Sotto, Jose Manalo, Maine Mendoza, Ryzza Mae Dizon, and Ciara Sotto	March 26, 2024
Holy Wednesday
1	(Filipino: Para 'di Makalimot)	Randolph Longjas	Miles Ocampo, Vic Sotto, Ryan Agoncillo, Atasha Muhlach, Tirso Cruz III, and Ice Seguerra	March 27, 2024

=== 2025 ===
No.	Title (Note: For Holy Monday, see Eat Bulaga (14 April 2025). Paano ba Magpatawad? | Full Episode | Eat Bulaga Lenten Special – via YouTube.; For Holy Tuesday, see Eat Bulaga (15 April 2025). Libre ang Mangarap | Full Episode | Eat Bulaga Lenten Special – via YouTube.; For Holy Wednesday, see Eat Bulaga (16 April 2025). Happy Pill | Full Episode | Eat Bulaga Lenten Special – via YouTube.)	Directed by	Stars	Original release date
Holy Monday
1	(Filipino: Paano Ba Magpatawad?)	Benedict Mique	Joey de Leon, Jose Manalo, Khayzy Bueno, Sam Rascal, Eunice Janine and Miles Ocampo	April 14, 2025
Holy Tuesday
1	(Filipino: Libre Ang Mangarap)	Benedict Mique	Ian Red, Carren Eistrup, Maine Mendoza, Ryzza Mae Dizon, and Paolo Ballesteros	April 15, 2025
Holy Wednesday
1	"Happy Pill"	Randolph Longjas	Vic Sotto, Ryan Agoncillo, Allan K, Wally Bayola, Jean Drilon, Anne Ferrer and Amber Torres	April 16, 2025

=== 2026 ===
No.	Title (Note: For Holy Monday, see Eat Bulaga (30 March 2026). THE CEO | Full Episode | Eat Bulaga Lenten Special – via YouTube.)	Directed by	Stars	Original release date
Holy Monday
1	"The CEO"	Randolph Longjas	Joey de Leon, Miles Ocampo, Carren Eistrup, Ian Red, Anne Ferrer, Wally Bayola, Darryl Shaine Jiandani, Armand Mandapat, Eunice Janine, Jean Drilon, Bembol Roco and Perla Bautista	March 30, 2026
Holy Tuesday
1	(Filipino: May Forever)	Randolph Longjas	Vic Sotto, Jose Manalo, Ryan Agoncillo, Hyeonyul Kim, Dominador Alviola Jr., Rouelle Cariño, Samantha Rascal, Khayzy Bueno, Bob Jbeili and Mike "Pekto" Nacua	March 31, 2026
Holy Wednesday
1	(Filipino: Bahay Aruga)	Benedict Mique	Allan K, Paolo Ballesteros, Ryzza Mae Dizon, Maine Mendoza, Lucky Robles, June Ryle Quiambao, Ciara Sotto, Julia Clarete, Teri Onor, Luane Dy and Helen Gamboa	April 1, 2026

== See also ==
- Holy Week in the Philippines
- Kalyeserye
- Pasyon
