= TVJ =

TVJ may refer to:

- Television Jamaica, one of Jamaica's two major television stations
- Thai VietJet Air, ICAO airline code TVJ
- TVJ Productions, a Philippine media production company
  - Tito Sotto, Vic Sotto, and Joey de Leon, collectively known as TVJ
