= Banal (2019 film) =

2019 Filipino psychological horror film

- Film poster
- Directed by: Peter Abanna
- Written by: Michelle Ngu
- Produced by: Michael Tuviera; Jojo Oconer
- Starring: Bianca Umali; Miguel Tanfelix; Andrea Brillantes; Taki; Kim Last
- Edited by: Aleksandr Castañeda
- Music by: Rion Eleazar
- Production company: APT Entertainment
- Release date: May 29, 2019
- Country: Philippines
- Language: Filipino

Banal (transl. Holy) is a 2019 Philippine psychological horror film directed by Peter Abanna. The film stars Bianca Umali, Miguel Tanfelix, Andrea Brillantes, Taki and Kim Last.

== Plot ==
Erika Villanueva has a terminally ill mother. She learns from her friend Yella "Yel" De Leon about a sacred mountain where devotees of Mary held a miracle cure that can heal all diseases. Erika enlists the help of her friends Richard "Richie/Rich" Santos, Rithea "Thea" Del Rosario and Jesus "Mac" De Andres to go on hiking on the sacred mountain to find the cure that can save her mother. One night, the group is possessed except for Erika, injuring Thea and Mac. The following morning, Yel goes missing, and Mac and Thea are killed by a ghostly figure.

As Rich and Erika continue towards the peak of the mountain, Rich learns from a group of armed men that Erika was chosen to be a demonic sacrificial offering to the God of Tumao, Ina (Mother). There are no Marian devotees in the mountain, but shamans who worship Ina. Erika is captured and learns that Yel is a member of the cult. Yel considers Erika to be "pure" and therefore worthy to be sacrificed. Rich and his group reach the cult just in time, and in the ensuing battle, Yel is injured. Rich and Erika escape, but Yel offers Erika one last chance to sacrifice her own life in order to save her mother. Using a flare gun, Erika shoots Yel which burns her to death. Later on, Erika and Rich are rescued by authorities.

== Cast ==
- Bianca Umali as Erika Villanueva
- Miguel Tanfelix as Richard "Richie/Rich" Santos
- Andrea Brillantes as Rithea "Thea" Del Rosario
- Taki as Yella "Yel" De Leon
- Kim Last as Jesus "Mac" De Andres
- Lou Veloso as Manong Cielo
- Ermie Concepcion as Aling Daling
- Arvic James Tan as Ian (Mountaineer 1)
- Francheska Salcedo as Mountaineer 2
- Glydel Mercado as Erika's mother.
