= Trip Ubusan: The Lolas vs. Zombies =

2017 Philippine zombie comedy film

- Theatrical release poster
- Directed by: Mark A. Reyes
- Starring: Jose Manalo; Wally Bayola; Paolo Ballesteros
- Production companies: APT Entertainment; M-Zet Productions
- Distributed by: GMA Pictures; Axinite Digicinema
- Release date: November 22, 2017
- Country: Philippines
- Language: Filipino
- Box office: ₱70 million

Trip Ubusan: The Lolas vs. Zombies is a 2017 Filipino zombie comedy film directed by Mark A. Reyes. A spin-off of Kalyeserye, a soap opera sub-segment of the variety show Eat Bulaga!, the film stars Jose Manalo, Wally Bayola, and Paolo Ballesteros, who reprise their roles as the Lolas alongside a large ensemble supporting cast, who are caught in the midst of a sudden zombie outbreak and must find a safe place to escape to before they are infected.

The film's title is a play on the 2016 South Korean film Train to Busan and the 2009 tower defense game Plants vs. Zombies. The film is produced by M-Zet Productions, who is part of APT Entertainment, and was released in Philippine cinemas on November 22, 2017. The movie was distributed by GMA Network.

== Plot ==
A mysterious outbreak starts in a local restaurant when a man consumes crispy pata made from contaminated organic pork. He suddenly falls ill, collapses, and reanimates as a zombie and infecting other customers, starting a fast-spreading outbreak.

Lola Nidora, Lola Tinidora, and Lola Tidora are taking care of their adoptive great-granddaughter, Charmaine Nidora—the daughter of Yaya Dub and Alden who was away on a business trip. On their ninth birthday, the Lolas decide to arrange a camping trip in Zambales. However, their close neighbor Ivy, as well as their housekeepers become infected with the disease and attack, After killing Ivy, the Lolas and Charmaine flee from their house in the minivan.

As the Lolas and Charmaine stop at a gas station to buy supplies, another zombie horde attack the area. In the confusion, Charmaine is separated from the Lolas and ends up in the company of teenage couples Aladin and Irish; and Cath and Will, as well as Aladin's sister Marcy, who is an expert on zombies; their friend Melo; Eva, a selfish aristocrat; and Loid, an armed convict who poses as one of the Department of Corrections officers who were bitten during the attack while escorting him. The group, sans Lolas, manages to escape aboard a tour bus driven by Jordan and his assistant and ex-girlfriend Abe.

As the tour bus group learn more about the zombie outbreak over the news, Jordan makes a stopover at a workshop, using the supplies there to fortify the bus. As the zombie swarm approaches, the group attempts to stay hidden, but Irish accidentally alerts their presence, while Melo, who had consumed infected pork, attacks Cathy before Loid shoots Melo in the heart with the pistol, further attracting the horde. Cathy attempts to pull Will back inside the bus but is shoved off by Eva. The tour bus group–save for Eva, Charmaine and Marcy–fights off the horde before the Lolas arrive by a motorcycle they found at the gas station and finish off the last of the zombies, reuniting with Charmaine, but not before Will and Cathy succumbing to an infection and reanimating as zombies, forcing the group to abandon them.

After camping out in the night, Lola Tinidora pilots the tour bus to the private airport where they possess a private jet, however, the pilot took off from the runway, and Eva's cellphone rings, rousing the horde and leading to Nidora's leg being bitten, causing tension among the group. When Eva learns of Nidora's infection through Charmaine, she demands to remove Nidora from the bus, however, the group decides against it, opting to head for a military-controlled safe-zone, hoping the doctors there will cure her infection. At the checkpoint, the group manages to feign Nidora's worsening infection from the guards as a stroke, but Loid's real identity is discovered. He bids goodbye to the Lolas as he is escorted away.

As the bus approaches the extraction point, they find it overrun with fast-moving zombies and the tour bus group attempts to make a beeline for the secured beachhead. Jordan gets bitten and, after confessing his love to Abe, stabs himself in the heart to avoid reanimation. Eva intentionally lets herself get bitten upon discovering her husband, Greg, has turned into a zombie. Only The Lolas, Charmaine and Marcy arrive in the extraction point and evacuate to the safe zone onto the rescue boat, but with Nidora's infection becoming severe, Tidora reluctantly pushes her off into the sea.

At the safe zone, Charmaine and the surviving Lolas are reunited with Marcy, Irish, Aladin and Abe. To their surprise, Nidora shows up, her infection having been cured after falling into seawater. Charmaine then receives a call from her parents, who reassures her of their condition.

== Cast ==
=== Main cast ===
- Jose Manalo as Lola Tinidora Zobeyala
- Wally Bayola as Lola Nidora Esperanza Zobeyala vda. de Explorer
- Paolo Ballesteros as Lola Tidora Zobeyala

=== Supporting cast ===
- Ryzza Mae Dizon as Marcelina "Marcy" Dimacuycoy - A young girl who is Aladin’s sister and an expert on zombies
- Caprice Cayetano as Charmaine Nidora Faulkerson - The granddaughter of the Lolas and Alden and Yaya Dub's daughter.
- Angelika de la Cruz as Evangeline "Eva" Flores - A selfish, wealthy aristocrat
- Lovely Abella as Abegail "Abe" Salazar - A tour bus employee and Jordan’s love interest
- Taki Saito as Irish "Rish" del Rosario - Aladin's girlfriend
- Kenneth Medrano as Aladin Galvez - Irish's boyfriend and Marcy’s older brother
- Miggy Tolentino as William "Will" Robles
- Shaira Diaz as Catherine "Cath" Lacerna

=== Extended cast ===
- Arthur Solinap as Jordan - A tour bus driver
- Rochelle Pangilinan-Solinap as Ivy
- Archie Adamos as Loid - an escaped prisoner who helps the Lolas and other survivors.
- Jhayvot Galang as Melo - a friend of Cath and Will.
- Bernardo's - Tidora's henchmen
- Rogelio's - Nidora's henchmen
- Quando's - Tinidora's henchmen

=== Special participation ===
- Al Tantay as a General Valdez
- Joshua Zamora as Greg - husband of Eva
- Niño Muhlach as Patient X
- Alden Richards and Maine Mendoza as Alden and Yaya Dub (voice only)

== Production ==
The principal photography of Trip Ubusan took 30 days and the production studio behind the film, APT Entertainment had to adjust the filming schedule to accommodate actors Paolo Ballesteros, Wally Bayola, and Jose Manalo's busy schedule. The film was reportedly inspired from the Korean horror film Train to Busan and described as a horror comedy film but it was advertised as featuring aspects of soap opera and drama.

== Release ==
Trip Ubusan opened on November 22, 2017 in almost 200 cinemas nationwide. The film had box office gross of more than ₱70 million.

== Reception ==
Trip Ubusan received an A rating from the Cinema Evaluation Board. It received rather positive reviews. A review for Rappler, however, found that "The film itself is as muddled as its title, with Reyes switching from comedy to romance to action to horror in the crudest of ways."

== See also ==
- List of zombie films
- Kalyeserye
- My Bebe Love
- Enteng Kabisote 10 and the Abangers
