= Padyak Princess =

Philippine comedy drama television series

- Title card
- Genre: Comedy drama
- Created by: Cyril Ramos
- Directed by: Easy Ferrer
- Starring: Miles Ocampo
- Opening theme: "Hanggang sa Dulo" by Julian Juangco
- Composer: Gino Doromal
- Country of origin: Philippines
- Original language: Filipino
- No. of episodes: 80

Production
- Executive producer: Catherine C. Talana
- Producers: Sienna G. Olaso; Michael B. Tuviera; Jojo Oconer
- Camera setup: Single-camera
- Running time: 45–60 minutes
- Production companies: Cignal Entertainment; APT Entertainment

Original release
- Network: TV5
- Release: June 10 – September 27, 2024

Padyak Princess (transl. tramp princess) is a Philippine comedy drama television series broadcast by TV5. Directed by Easy Ferrer, it stars Miles Ocampo, Jameson Blake, Joao Constancia and Kira Balinger. It aired on the network's Gandang Mornings line up and worldwide on Kapatid Channel from June 10 to September 27, 2024, and was replaced by Ang Himala ni Niño.

The series is streaming online on YouTube.

== Premise ==
Princess is a charming and determined young woman who dreams of someday reviving her family's reputation and her barangay's golden days. To make ends meet for her family, she must step up as the breadwinner.

== Cast and characters ==
Cast

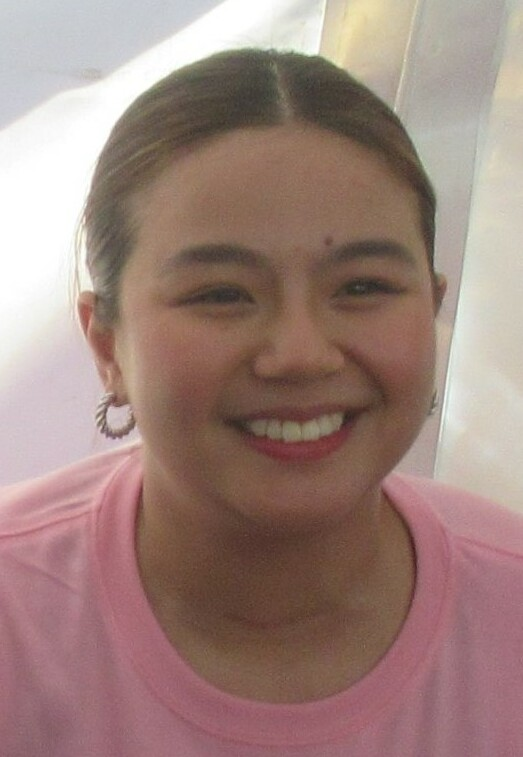
Miles Ocampo

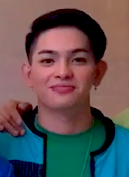
Joao Constancia

Main cast

- Miles Ocampo as Cecilia "Princess" Nieva-Santos
- Jameson Blake as Wesley "Wes/Whitey" Yuzon
- Joao Constancia as Miko Santos
- Kira Balinger as Lyca dela Cruz

Supporting cast

- Yayo Aguila as Anselma "Selma" Nieva
- Ara Mina as Susan Velarde / Rosa
- Ces Quesada as Lucinda "Nanay Lucing" Santos
- Christian Vasquez as Ernesto "Ka Ernie" dela Cruz
- Matthew Mendoza as Victor Yuzon / Donald Vasquez
- Gillian Vicencio as Millie Castelo-Madrid
- Jem Manicad as Ramsey "Ram" de Guzman
- Karissa Toliongco as Casey Franco
- David Remo as Andoy Nieva
- Miel Epinoza as Jing Jing Nieva

Recurring cast

- Whitney Tyson as Aling Betchay
- Hershey Neri as Dafodil
- Miggy Tolentino as Gregory "Dos" Madrid II
- Julian Roxas as Uno
- Milo Elmido Jr. as Rizalina
- Allen Cecilio as Paul
- Dylan Ray Talon as Tres
- Billy Jake Cortez as Filip
- David Minemoto as Dong
- Joel Pineda as Mang Sal
- Rowena Cardona as Inday

Guest cast

- Chanelle Manaig as young Princess
- Francis Saangundo as young Andoy
- Carl Garcia as young Miko
- Lhian Gimeno as young Millie
- John Leonor as young Ram
- Dwin Araza as Sanitation Officer
- Floyd Florentino as Sanitation Officer
- Rubi Rubi as Mayora

Special participation

- Cris Villanueva as Martin Nieva†
