= Jon Timmons =

Filipino American actor, model and television personality

- Born: Jonathan Mark Timmons (Note: Jon Timmons is a United States citizen. Thus, he does not possess his mother's maiden name (Cabico) as is the convention in the Philippines.); February 21, 1991 (age 35); Los Angeles, California
- Other name: Bae Jon
- Education: AA Science
- Alma mater: El Camino College
- Occupations: actor; model; television personality
- Years active: GMA Network (since 2014); TV5 (since 2020)
- Height: 5 ft 7 in (170 cm)
- Parents: Jon Timmons Sr. (father, deceased); Judy C. Timmons (mother)
- Website: Jon Timmons on Facebook

Jonathan Mark Cabico Timmons (born February 21, 1991, in Los Angeles, California), also known as Jon Timmons as his screen name, is a Filipino American actor, model and television personality. He is the oldest member of the home group That's My Bae and he is also seen in the noontime variety show Eat Bulaga!.

== Personal life ==
He was an AA Science graduate at El Camino College in Los Angeles before joining That's My Bae. In California, he also had a part-time job as a cashier at a mall and then at a pet store. Timmons was simply visiting the Philippines when he joined That's My Bae: "Twerk It" Dance Contest to try his luck in the Philippine showbiz industry. After becoming part of That's My Bae, he decided to stay in the Philippines.

== Career ==
His career began when he became a contestant of Eat Bulaga Twerk it Dance competition in 2015. He was the oldest members of all male-dance group known as That's My Bae.

== Personal life ==
On September 16, 2022, Timmons married his non-showbiz girlfriend, Sarah Christina Morgans in civil wedding ceremony in Minley Manor, United Kingdom. The couple have been dating for 7 years and were engaged in 2021.

== Filmography ==
=== Film ===
Year	Title	Role
2014	Trenderas	Host of The Next Pinoy Pop Icon
2015	#ParangNormal Activity	Emilio Actor #2
2015–2016	Juan Tamad	TomDen Rodriguez
2016	Eat Bulaga's Lenten Presentation: God Gave Me You	Flight Attendant
2016–2017	Trops	Jon Masson
2017	Eat Bulaga's Lenten Presentation: Mansyon	James Marcelo

=== Television ===
Year	Title	Role
2015–2019	Eat Bulaga!	Himself

== See also ==
- Kim Last
- Kenneth Medrano
- Miggy Tolentino
- That's My Bae
