= Kim Last =

British actor and dancer (born 1997)

- Born: Kim Michael Last; 20 January 1997 (age 29); King's Cross, London, England
- Other name: Bae Kim
- Occupations: Actor, dancer
- Years active: GMA Network (2015–2025); TV5 (2021–present)
- Known for: That's My Bae
- Television: Trops as Kim Park; Eat Bulaga; Sunday PinaSaya

Kim Michael Last (born 20 January 1997) is a Filipino-British actor and dancer. He is known as the youngest member of the all-male dance group That's My Bae on the noontime variety show Eat Bulaga!.

== Early life ==
Kim Last was born in King's Cross, London to a British father and a Kapampangan mother from Angeles City, Pampanga. He immigrated to the Philippines when he was 17 years old.

He studied Government and Politics and A-Level Biology at Chelsea Academy in London before joining the competition.

== Career ==
Last first appeared in 2015 as a contestant of the That's My Bae: "Twerk It" Dance Contest segment of the noontime variety show Eat Bulaga!, and became a member of the dance group That's My Bae.

In 2016, he became a regular cast member of the comedy-variety show Sunday PinaSaya. Also in this year, he get the biggest acting break with his group by the morning series Trops.

== Other ventures ==
=== Boxing ===
Last was a professional trainer in boxing before joining the entertainment industry.

== Filmography ==
=== Television ===
Year	Title	Role
2015–2019	Eat Bulaga!	Himself/Performer
2015	Juan Tamad	Jepoy Bagalihog
2015	Alisto!	Himself/Guest
2016–2019	Sunday PinaSaya	Himself/host/performer
2016	Eat Bulaga's Lenten Special: Walang Kapalit	Carlo's Friend
2016–2017	Trops	Kim Park
2017	Eat Bulaga's Lenten Special: Mansyon	Nikko Bragancia
2017	D' Originals	Dan
2017	Hay, Bahay!	Jimboy
2017	All Star Videoke	Himself/Contestant
2018	Eat Bulaga's Lenten Special: My Carenderia Girl	Ben
2018	Mars	Himself/Guest
2018	Lip Sync Battle Philippines	Himself/Contestant
2019	Beautiful Justice	Denver Jacinto
2020–2021	Ate ng Ate Ko	Patrick Sevilla

=== Movies ===
Year	Title	Role(s)
2015	My Bebe Love: #KiligPaMore	Cameo appearance
2019	Circa	Michael’s friend

== Accolades ==
Year	Award	Category	Result	Ref.
2017	48th GMMSF Box-Office Entertainment Awards	Most Promising Recording/Performing Group	Won	

== See also ==
- Jon Timmons
- Kenneth Medrano
- Miggy Tolentino
