= Jam Sebastian =

Filipino actor

- Born: Jam Vhille Fernando Sebastian; 20 March 1986; Santa Cruz, Manila, Philippines
- Died: 4 March 2015 (aged 28); Taguig, Metro Manila, Philippines
- Resting place: Manila Memorial Park
- Occupations: Actor; YouTuber
- Years active: 2007–2015
- Relatives: Yexel Sebastian (brother)

Jam Vhille Fernando Sebastian (20 March 1986 – 4 March 2015), better known as Jam Sebastian, was a Filipino actor and an internet personality. He is known for being in a love team with Michelle Liggayu, who was his fiancée in real life with the two collectively known as JaMich. He received significant reception in the Philippines as a YouTuber.

== Biography ==
Jam Sebastian was born at 7:37 PM on Thursday, 20 March 1986 at the Chinese General Hospital and Medical Center and was the second son of Vilmo Flores Sebastian (born 28 August 1961, Santa Cruz, Manila) and Maria Carmen "Maricar" G. Fernando. His older brother Yexel is a toy collector who owns three toy museums in the Philippines.

== JaMich ==
Before JaMich, Sebastian had described his relationship with Paolinne Michelle Liggayu as puppy love. Sebastian had also confirmed during an interview with StarStudio Magazine that they aka "JaMich" have been a couple since 2008.

JaMich became one of YouTube's popular love teams in 2011. By Chance was their first uploaded video which gained more than seven million views with 543,163 accumulated subscribers. The duo joined Twitter in June 2011 and has since acquired over a million followers. After six years, the official engagement of JaMich was announced. It was Liggayu who proposed to Sebastian at the Philippine International Convention Center on 11 May 2014.

== Illness and death ==
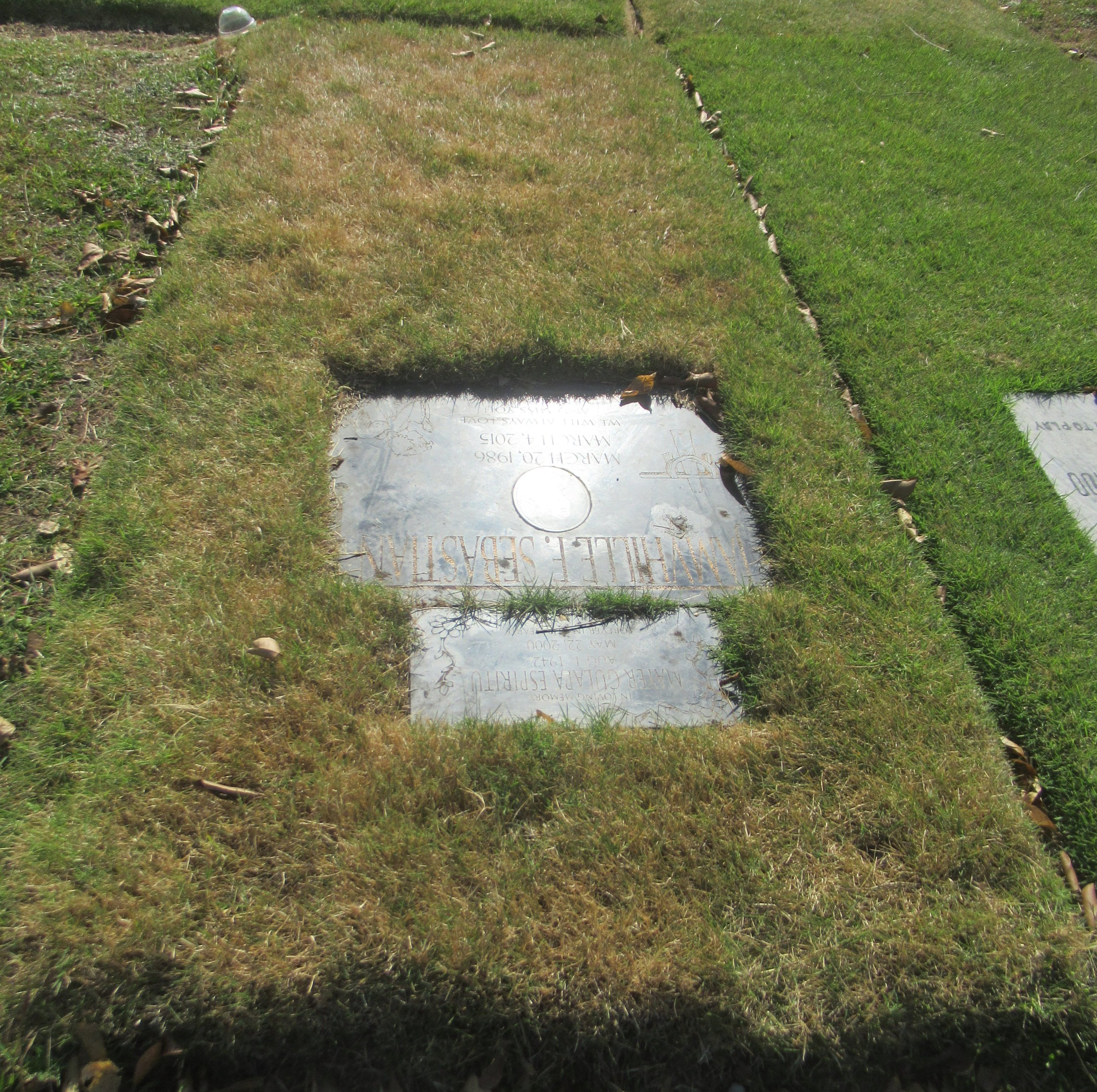
Sebastian's grave at Manila Memorial Park – Sucat.

In January 2014, Sebastian was diagnosed with stage 4 lung cancer. He died on 4 March 2015, sixteen days before his 29th birthday. Jam was buried at the Manila Memorial Park – Sucat Parañaque.

== Filmography ==
=== Short films ===
Year	Title	Role	Notes	Ref.
2011	By Chance	Jam	based on Strangers, again	
2011	Doppleganger	Jam	Horror film	
2011	The Chase	the chaser	Interactive video	
2011	5 Years From Now	Jam		
2011	Switch	Jam		
2011	"TEXT" Story of Best Friends	Ivan	a Marcelo Santos III story	
2012	My Nerdy Valentine	Earl		
2012	Ok Lang Yan	Jam	a film by Yexel Sebastian, from the movies 3 Idiots & Sex is Zero	
2012	Moving Closer	Jam		
2012	Love Share Smile	Jam	official entry in Globe Wonderfilm Contest	
2012	THAILAND (Long Distance Relationship)	Jam	sponsored by Penshoppe	
2012	Pinky Swear	Jam		
2012	Picture Perfect (Remake)	Jam	a remake of the 2012 Jubilee Project short-film of the same title	
2012	My Better Half	Jam		
2013	JANINE	Jose		
2013	Lovers Quarrel	Jam	with Globe Prepaid GoSAKTO	
2013	Pinky Swear 2	Jam	sequel of Pinky Swear	
2013	The One	Jam		
2013	Classmates Love Story	Jam		
2013	Once Upon A Valentine	Hector	by Wattpad author Phia Sakura	

=== Music videos ===
Year	Title	Artist	Notes	Ref.
2012	A Thousand Years	Christina Perri		
2012	Basta Ako	6cyclemind	feat. JAMICH & Jinri Park	
2013	Selfie Song	Davey Langit	feat. JAMICH & Gang	
2013	Hay Nako	LJ Manzano	feat. JAMICH, Classmates Love Story Soundtrack	
