= Taki Saito =

Filipina actress

- 齋藤 俊子
- Born: Takako Estrada Saitō; April 21, 2000 (age 26); Fukuoka Prefecture, Japan
- Citizenship: Philippines; Brazil
- Education: Colegio San Agustin - Southwoods
- Occupations: Actress; singer; dancer; model; host
- Years active: 2015–present
- Agent: Triple A
- Known for: Eat Bulaga!; Calle Siete; Trops
- Height: 1.5 m (4 ft 11 in)
- Musical career
- Genres: J-pop; Dance-pop; R&B
- Instrument: Vocals
- Labels: Avex; Rhythm Zone
- Formerly of: Faky
- Website: lit.link/takifaky

Takako "Taki" Estrada Saito (齋藤 俊子, Saitō Takako; born April 21, 2000) is a Filipino and Brazilian actress and singer and a member of J-pop girl group Faky. She was born in Japan and was raised in France and the Philippines.

== Career ==
Saito was an intro-acting student at Star Magic Workshops before.

Saito attended an acting workshop with celebrated director and coach Gina Alajar. She had mixed feelings about the experience but ultimately feels blessed to be trained by the veteran.

Saito started her acting career in #ParangNormal Activity, a horror-comedy show by TV5. She was paired with her first loveteam onscreen Ryle Paolo Tan.

Saito appeared as Allyson in Ismol Family, a weekly Filipino situational comedy of GMA Network. She appeared as a love triangle between Miguel Tanfelix (Tan Tan) and Bianca Umali (Yumi).

Saito played Suzanne "Sushie" Silang in Calle Siete a family comedy drama series broadcast by GMA Network, where she worked with Ryzza Mae Dizon, Eula Valdez and her loveteam Kenneth Medrano. The program premiered on June 13, 2016 and was aired worldwide on GMA Pinoy TV.

Saito is also known for being one of the lead stars in Trops, the late morning/early noontime show of GMA Network which aired on October 24, 2016 where she played the role of Martha Kiera "Taki" Masson. The show tackled the issues faced by the youth of today — peer pressure, friendship, rivalry, generation gap, and of course, romance. The love triangle of Kenneth Medrano, Miggy Tolentino and Taki Saito was one of the show’s highlights. But Kenneth Medrano still remained as her loveteam in the show.

On October 14, 2017 Saito returns on CMSI MUSIC TV For The show namely as Ready Set MORe!

On December 20, 2018 it was announced that Taki was a new member of the J-pop girl union Faky.

== Personal life ==
Saito was born in Shizuoka Prefecture, Japan. The family then moved to Paris, France, where they remained until Taki was 13 years old. The family then moved to Manila, Philippines where they have remained ever since.

She is now currently living in Tokyo, Japan, since October 2018. Taki's mother is Spanish of Japanese and Filipino descent, while her biological father is Brazilian of Japanese descent, whom she never met personally.

Even though she grew up abroad, she is fluent in speaking Tagalog because instead of studying in an international school, she studied in Colegio San Agustin - Southwoods for her to be familiar with the Filipino language. She also studied at Brent International School.

== Filmography ==
=== Film ===
Year	Title	Role	Notes
2017	Trip Ubusan: The Lolas vs. Zombies	Irish "Rish" del Rosario	Supporting role
2019	Banal	Yel	Main role / Antagonist

=== Television ===
Year	Title	Role	Notes
2015	#ParangNormal Activity	Lexi DuBois	Supporting Cast
2015	Ismol Family	Alysson	Episode Guest
2016	Calle Siete	Suzanne "Sushie" Silang	Supporting Cast
2016–2017	Eat Bulaga!	Herself	Performer / Host
2016–2017	Trops	Taki Masson-Mercado	Lead Role
2017	Hay, Bahay!	Tammy	Episode 60
2017	Dear Uge	Heidi	Episode 90
2017	All Star Videoke	Herself	Guest
2017	The Lolas' Beautiful Show	Herself	Guest
2017	Eat Bulaga's Lenten Special: Pagpapatawad	Sakura	Lead Role
2018	Sunday PinaSaya	Herself	Recurring cast
2018	Elehiya	Cristina	Lead Role

=== Web ===
Year	Title	Role
2019	60 seconds with Taki	Herself
2021	Who is a Wolf? Season 9	Herself
2021	Who is a Wolf? Season 10	Herself
