= Yexel Sebastian =

Filipino YouTuber

- Born: Yexel Fernando Sebastian; 12 March 1982 (age 44); Santa Cruz, Manila, Philippines
- Occupation: YouTuber (formerly)
- Partner: Mikee Agustin (2013–present)
- Children: 1
- Relatives: Jam Sebastian (younger brother; deceased)

Yexel Fernando Sebastian (born 12 March 1982) is a Filipino former YouTuber and retired dancer who claims to own the 'largest Optimus Prime bust in Asia.' He is suspected of fraud in a case accusing him of scamming a total of ₱50 billion pesos from victims. He is also known for his toy collection, which is displayed in several museums in the Philippines.

== Biography ==
Yexel Sebastian was born on 12 March 1982 to Vilmo Flores Sebastian (born August 28, 1961, Santa Cruz, Manila) and Ma. Carmen Sebastian. His younger brother was the late fellow YouTuber Jam Sebastian.

Yexel Sebastian was a former member of the dance group Black and White Street Kids at Work to Beat Machine Higher Level, Street Boys, Sop Boys and Jabbawockeez Fanatics.

=== Legal issues ===
On March 16, 2024, 30 alleged victims filed syndicated estafa complaints under Presidential Decree No. 1689 as amended with the National Bureau of Investigation (NBI). 24 Oras reported that "Sebastian has been sued for junket investment scam and is also facing a complaint for violation of R.A. 8799, "Securities Regulation Code". Palmer Mallari, NBI chief of fraud and financial crimes division said "the money that the content creator allegedly got away with totaled P50 billion." In 2023, Sebastian and his partner, Mikee Agustin allegedly fled to Japan to evade several investment scam cases filed against them. The alleged scheme was reportedly aimed at Overseas Filipino workers, regular employees, celebrities, and business people.

== Collection ==
His toy museum has housed his toy collection since 1989. The collection now includes over 50,000 toys and 900 life-sized statues. It is located in Las Piñas, Philippines. The four-story building exhibits miniatures to life-sized cartoon, animation, video game and movie-based characters. Its main attraction is an 18-foot Optimus Prime bust created by Abet Valdecantos.

Sebastian's second museum, named Yexel's Toy Collection, is located inside the Boom na Boom Complex in Pasay. As of December 2014, Yexel's Toy Museum's third branch, dubbed as Amazing Stories of Yexel's Museum, in partnership with the Manila Ocean Park, was completed and introduced to the public.

He claims he currently owns 50,000 toys, and over 900 Life-size statues.
