= Calle Siete =

2016 Philippine television drama series

- Title card
- Genre: Comedy drama
- Developed by: Jose Mari Abacan; Lia Domingo; Cyril Ramos; Jerome Zamora
- Written by: Robert Raz; Charlotte Dianco; Ma. Acy Ramos; Michelle Ngu
- Directed by: Monti Parungao
- Creative director: Jenny Ferre
- Starring: Ryzza Mae Dizon; Eula Valdez; Christian Vasquez
- Country of origin: Philippines
- Original language: Tagalog
- No. of episodes: 94

Production
- Executive producer: Adrian Raphael V. Santos
- Producers: Antonio P. Tuviera; Jacqui L. Cara; Michael Tuviera; Jojo C. Oconer; Ramel L. David; Camille G. Montaño
- Production locations: Manila, Philippines
- Editors: Bong Guillermo; Tara Illenberger
- Camera setup: Multiple-camera setup
- Running time: 30 minutes
- Production company: TAPE Inc.

Original release
- Network: GMA Network
- Release: June 13 – October 21, 2016

Calle Siete (transl. seventh street) is a 2016 Philippine television drama comedy series broadcast by GMA Network. Directed by Monti Parungao, it stars Ryzza Mae Dizon, Eula Valdez and Christian Vasquez. It premiered on June 13, 2016. The series concluded on October 21, 2016, with a total of 94 episodes.

== Premise ==
Sheila and Mark, a couple living in Dubai and working as a physical therapist and a spa attendant. The two decided to return to the Philippines because of their enough savings to build their dream house and dream business, a spa cum coffee shop. Sheila came home first because her contract expired while Mark, on the other hand, has a remaining month. Another reason was he is still training his job successor. Sheila surprised her Lola Nitz which she is celebrating her birthday in Mabuhay Compound where she grew up with the Mabuhay clan. However, she also found out that the bank would nearly confiscate her hometown so she spoke of her grandmother to pay it first.

== Cast and characters ==
Cast

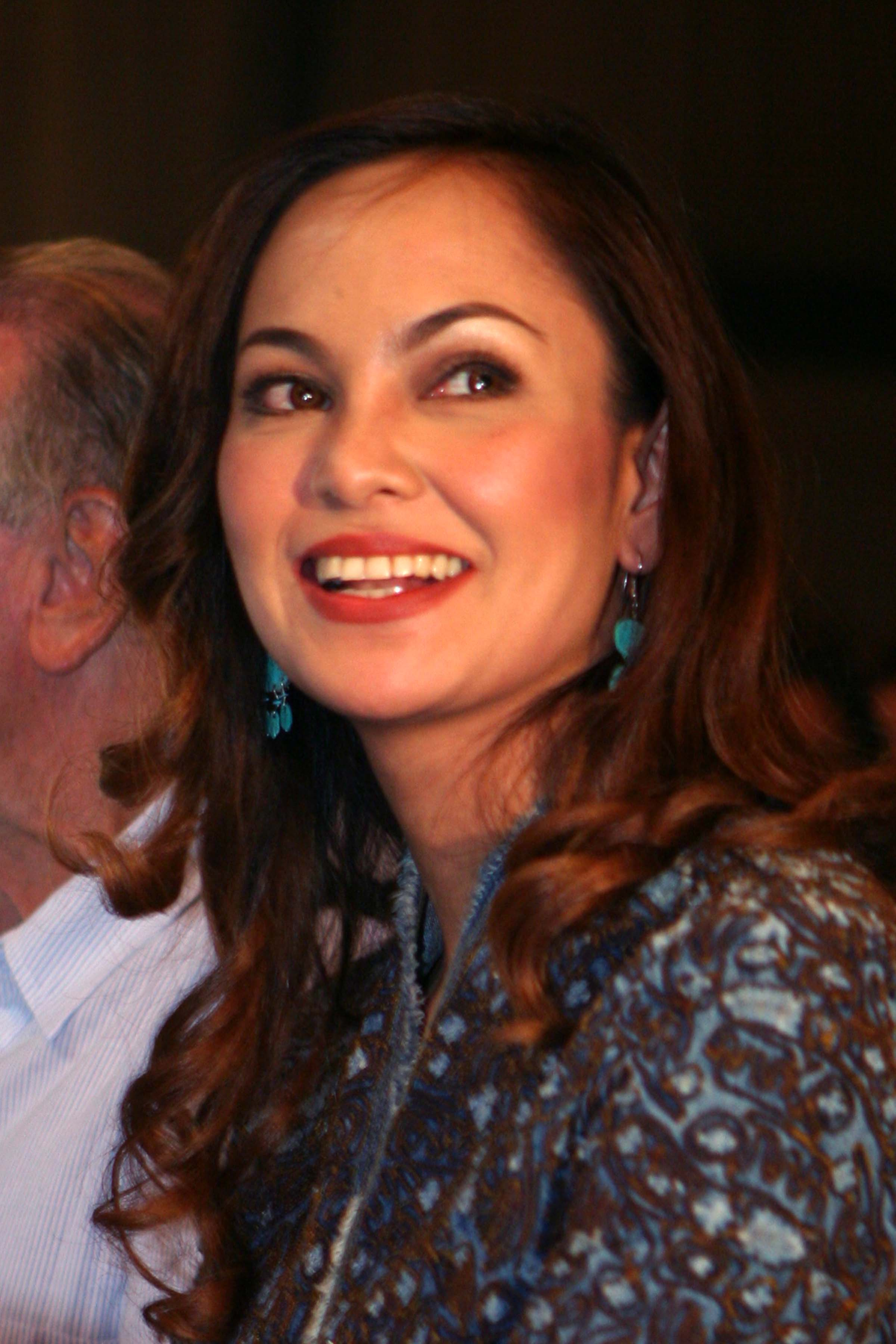
Eula Valdez

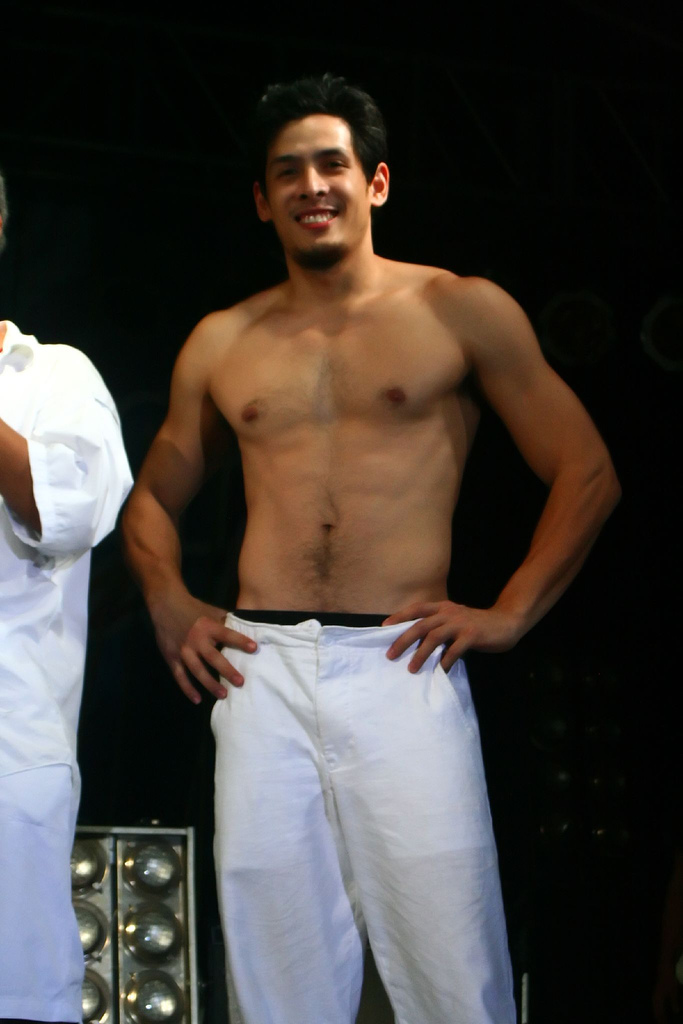
Christian Vasquez

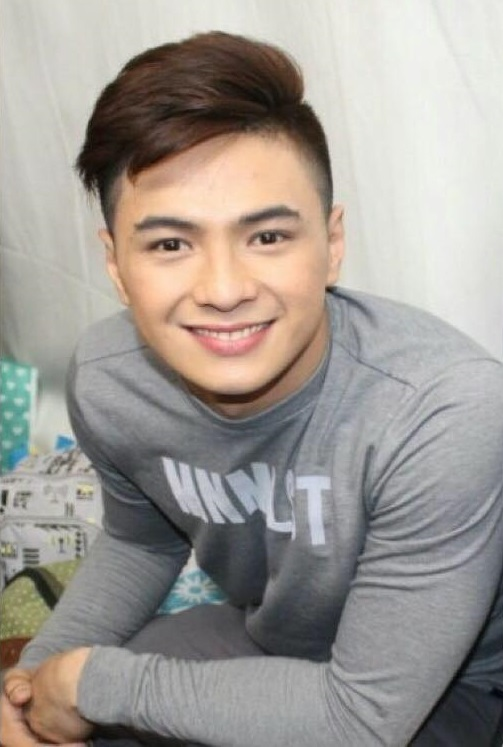
Kenneth Medrano

Lead cast

- Ryzza Mae Dizon as Barbie Delloso
- Eula Valdez as Shiela Mabuhay-Sebastian
- Christian Vasquez as Mark Sebastian

Supporting cast

- Kenneth Medrano as Jonas Delloso
- Patricia Tumulak as Patricia "Patring" Castro
- Gloria Sevilla as Elenita "Nitz" Mabuhay
- Rubi Rubi as Margarita "Margie" Silang
- Lucky Mercado as John Delloso
- Takako "Taki" Saito as Suzanne "Sushie" Silang
- Lovely Abella as Bonifacia "Bonnie" Suarez
- Leonora Cano as Mema
- Sinon Loresca as Manuel "Welwel" Geronimo
- Kervin Rivas as Kervin
- Bryan Benedict as Caleb
- Ian Angeles as Ian

Recurring cast

- Adrienne Vergara as Bianca
- Hailey Lim as Cristy
- Charles Jacob Briz as Ken
- Jester Hernandez as Toby

Guest cast

- Miguel Luna as Miguel
- Petite as Snowkie
- Maureen Larrazabal as Maria Magdalena
- Regine Tolentino as Phoebe
- Sandy Talag as Crystal
- Kylie Padilla as Sophie
- Archie Alemania as Timo
- Mosang as Mom Aw

== Ratings ==
According to AGB Nielsen Philippines' Mega Manila household television ratings, the pilot episode of Calle Siete earned an 11.4% rating. The final episode scored a 14.3% rating.
