= Sunday PinaSaya =

Philippine television variety show

- Title card from 2018 to 2019
- Genre: Variety show
- Created by: Michael Tuviera
- Directed by: Noel Cabacungan; Rich Ilustre; Louie Ignacio
- Presented by: Ai-Ai delas Alas; Marian Rivera; Wally Bayola; Jose Manalo
- Opening theme: "Sunday PinaSaya theme song"
- Ending theme: "Puso ng Saya"
- Country of origin: Philippines
- Original language: Tagalog
- No. of episodes: 226

Production
- Executive producers: Michael Tuviera; Ramel L. David; Jose Mari Abacan; Anabelle Macauba; Raymund Villariza
- Producer: Antonio P. Tuviera
- Production locations: Studio 7, GMA Network Studios Annex, Quezon City, Philippines
- Camera setup: Multiple-camera setup
- Running time: 120–150 minutes
- Production companies: APT Entertainment; GMA Entertainment Group

Original release
- Network: GMA Network
- Release: August 9, 2015 – December 29, 2019

Sunday PinaSaya (transl. Sunday Made Happier; lit. 'Sunday PhilippinesHappy') is a Philippine television variety show broadcast by GMA Network. Hosted by Ai-Ai delas Alas, Marian Rivera, Wally Bayola and Jose Manalo, it premiered on August 9, 2015 on the network's Sunday Grande sa Hapon line up. The show concluded on December 29, 2019, with a total of 226 episodes.

== Cast ==
Cast

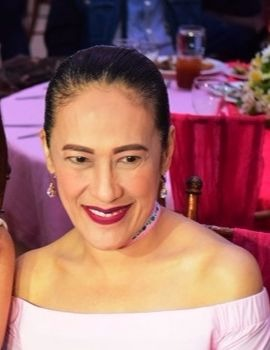
Ai-Ai delas Alas

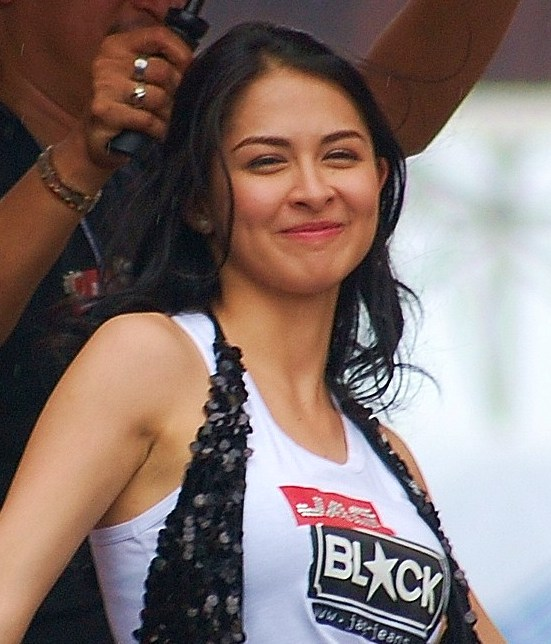
Marian Rivera

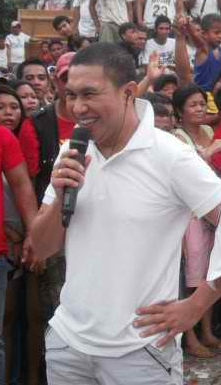
Jose Manalo

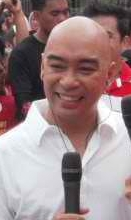
Wally Bayola

Lead cast

- Ai-Ai delas Alas (2015–19)
- Marian Rivera (2015–19)
- Jose Manalo (2015–19)
- Wally Bayola (2015–19)

Supporting cast

- Alden Richards (2015–19)
- Barbie Forteza (2015–19)
- Julie Anne San Jose (2015–19)
- Valeen Montenegro (2015–19)
- Jerald Napoles (2015–19)
- Joey Paras (2015–19)
- Gladys Guevarra (2015–19)
- Boobsie Wonderland (2015–19)
- Atak (2016–17)
- Gabbi Garcia (2016–18)
- Andre Paras (2016–19)
- Ruru Madrid (2016–19)
- Mike "Pekto" Nacua (2016–19)
- Kim Last (2016–19)
- Lovely Abella (2016–19)
- Ryzza Mae Dizon (2017–19)
- Kyline Alcantara (2018–19)
- Bianca Umali (2018–19)
- Taki Saito (2018)
- Miguel Tanfelix (2018–19)
- Jak Roberto (2019)
- Will Ashley (2019)
- Bruce Roeland (2019)
- Sofia Pablo (2019)
- Kelvin Miranda (2019)

== Ratings ==
According to AGB Nielsen Philippines' Mega Manila household television ratings, the pilot episode of Sunday PinaSaya earned a 22.7% rating.

== Accolades ==
Accolades received by Sunday PinaSaya
| Year | Award | Category | Recipient | Result | Ref. |
|---|---|---|---|---|---|
| 2016 | Platinum Stallion Media Awards | Best Entertainment Program | Sunday PinaSaya | Won | |
| 2016 | PEP List Awards | Comedy Show of the Year | Sunday PinaSaya | Won | |
| 2016 | OFW Gawad Parangal | Best Variety Show | Sunday PinaSaya | Won | |
| 2016 | 30th PMPC Star Awards for Television | Best Variety Show | Sunday PinaSaya | Won | |
| 2016 | 30th PMPC Star Awards for Television | Best Female TV Host | Marian Rivera | Nominated | |
| 2017 | 31st PMPC Star Awards for Television | Best Variety Show | Sunday PinaSaya | Won | |
| 2017 | 31st PMPC Star Awards for Television | Best Female TV Host | Marian Rivera | Won | |
| 2018 | 32nd PMPC Star Awards for Television | Best Variety Show | Sunday PinaSaya | Won | |
| 2018 | 32nd PMPC Star Awards for Television | Best Female TV Host | Ai-Ai delas Alas | Nominated | |
| 2018 | 32nd PMPC Star Awards for Television | Best Female TV Host | Marian Rivera | Nominated | |
| 2018 | OFW Gawad Parangal | Best Variety Show | Sunday PinaSaya | Won | |
| 2019 | Box Office Entertainment Awards | Most Popular TV Program - Musical Variety/Noontime & Primetime | Sunday PinaSaya | Won | |
| 2019 | Inside Showbiz Awards | Favorite TV Variety | Sunday PinaSaya | Won | |
| 2019 | 33rd PMPC Star Awards for Television | Best Variety Show | Sunday PinaSaya | Won | |
| 2019 | 33rd PMPC Star Awards for Television | Best Female TV Host | Marian Rivera | Nominated | |
| 2021 | 34th PMPC Star Awards for Television | Best Variety Show | Sunday PinaSaya | Nominated | |
