= Colegio de la Inmaculada Concepcion – Cebu =

Roman Catholic school in Cebu City, Philippines

Colegio de la Inmaculada Concepción - Cebu
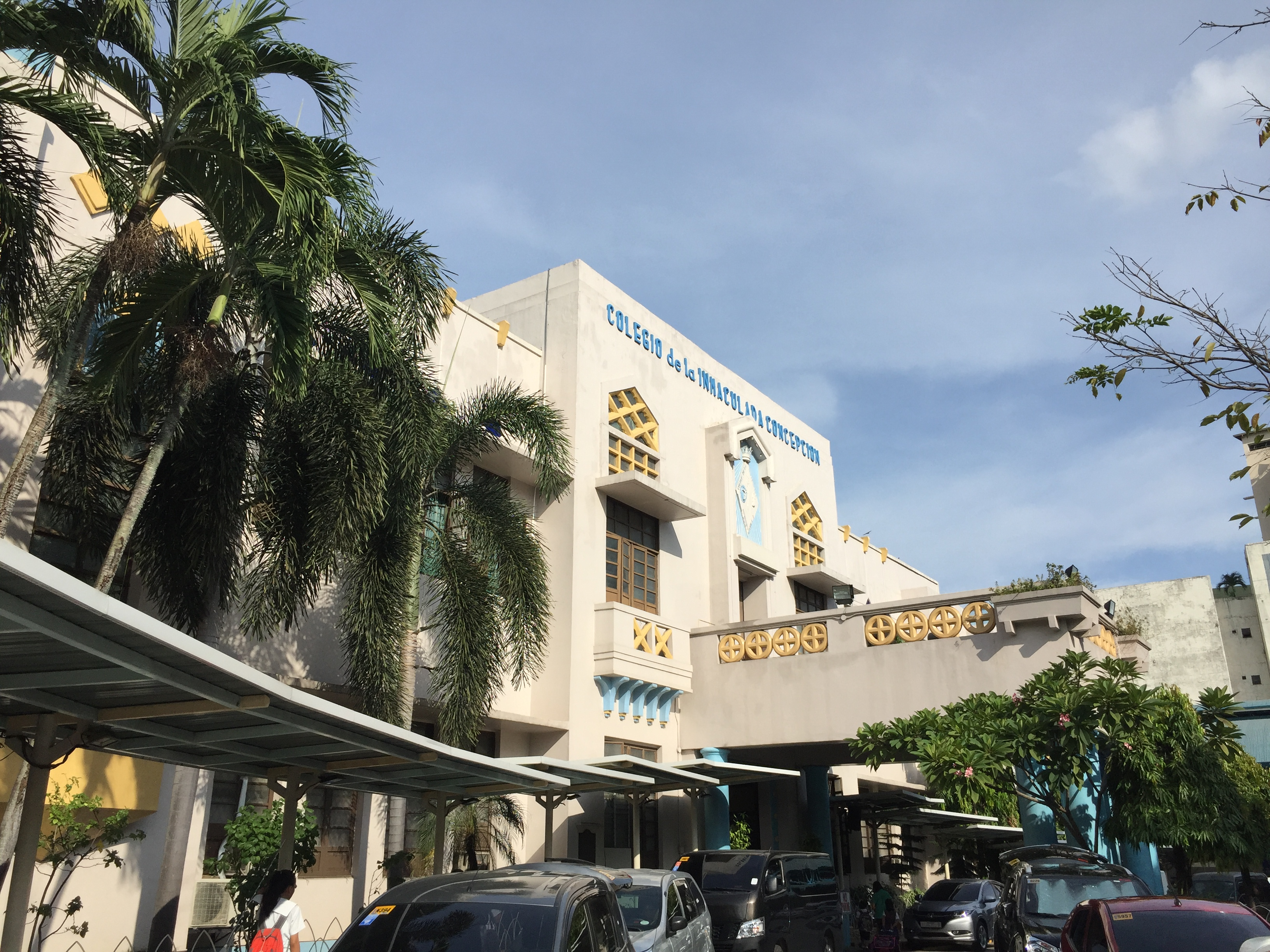
- Colegio de la Inmaculada Concepcion
- Type: Private Roman Catholic Non-profit Coeducational Basic education institution
- Established: May 30, 1880; 146 years ago
- Founders: Hermanitas de la Madre de Dios; Little Sisters of the Mother of God
- Religious affiliation: Roman Catholic (Daughters of Charity)
- Academic affiliations: DC-SLMES, CEAP; SMEC, PAASCU
- Patron Saint: Saint Vincent de Paul
- Location: 45 Gorordo Avenue, Cebu City, Cebu, Philippines; 10°18′42″N 123°54′15″E
- Campus: Urban; Main Campus Cebu City (secondary school); Satellite Campus Mandaue City (Elementary School)
- Colors: Blue and White
- Website: https://ciccebu.edu.ph

Colegio de la Inmaculada Concepción - Cebu, also known by its acronym CIC, is a private Catholic basic education institution operated by the Sisters of Charity of Saint Vincent De Paul in Cebu City, Philippines. It began operation on May 30, 1880, in its Cebu City campus and originally was an all-girls school, making it the first school for girls in Cebu. It started to accept boys in 2010 making it co-educational.

== History ==
In the middle of the 19th century, the necessity of founding a charitable institution was felt in the Diocese of Cebu. To this end, a hospital for leprous patients was founded by the Ilmo, Obispo de Cebú, Romualdo Jimeno.

Rev. Fernando del Canal, C.M. was to be the source and soul of the charitable works of the hospital. He arrived in Cebu on November 13, 1869, having been a priest in his home province Burgos, Spain. He was convinced that the young women working in the Casa de Caridad had the necessary vocation to continue indefinitely. To foster this vocation, he thought of giving them a religious habit to wear in place of their lay clothes and to name them “Hermanitas de la Madre de Dios” (Little Sisters of the Mother of God). With the establishment of this religious community on September 8, 1878, came the appointment of a new Superior. This fell, by common consent, upon Apolonia Lasala. Thereupon the new community renewed its desire to consecrate its members to God through the service of the sick poor. The Casa de Caridad was situated on Calle Solidaridad but, in time, this was destroyed and a new wing of the Colegio was constructed in its place.

After the new community was formed, Bishop Benito de Madridejos visited them and saw the opportunities that presented themselves for the benefit of the entire diocese. He proposed the opening of a school for the girls to be managed by the Hermanitas. However, there were many obstacles to overcome, such as the lack of land, house and personnel. To generate funds, the Hermanitas resorted to the making of scapulars, from which they were to purchase a little house fronting the seminary. With this, the construction began. Meanwhile, efforts were made to look for the right persons to direct the work. Two came from Manila: Círila Miranda from Concordia College and Hilaria Salinas from Hospicio de San José. Both had obtained their Teacher's Certificates from the Normal School. Arriving in Cebu in February, 1880, they were attracted to the company of the Hermanitas and, on 15 May of the same year, they dressed the holy habit and became part of the small community.

The school year 1880–1881 was fast approaching, and the work of the Colegio was progressing much too slow. The Hermanitas, therefore, rented a house belonging to Don Antonio Roa, which was in front of the seminary. Two classrooms were prepared on the second floor, a third room served for the free school and thus, simply and without ostentation, classes opened on May 30, 1880, thus inaugurating Colegio de la Inmaculada Concepción. Situated at Mártires Street fronting the Colegio Seminario de San Carlos, the Colegio started with 66 young girls. Lessons with special emphasis on Religion, Spanish, Music and Home Arts were offered.

=== Early years of Colegio de la Inmaculada Concepción ===
The “colegio” was a simple one-storey affair situated at Martires Street, Cebu City fronting the Colegio Seminario de San Carlos. The Administration was entrusted to the community of the Hermanitas de la Madre de Dios. Sr. Hilaria Salinas became the directress of the school. The first group of students consisted of 66 girls. More like a finishing school, the curriculum was a blend of the academic (elementary and secondary in content) and the cultural (Home Economics and Fine Arts and Music). Spanish was the medium of instruction.

On January 29, 1895, the Visitatrix and Visitor of the Daughters of Charity arrived in Cebu with the first five Sisters. The following day the incorporation of 20 Hermanitas de la Madre de Dios with these five Daughters of Charity took place in a solemn High Mass and Te Deum was sung for thanksgiving. The Sisters were fused with the first community of Spanish Daughters of Charity of St. Vincent de Paul, who came to the Philippines to bring the gospel message of Christ. It was the first Catholic school for girls in Cebu that offered special emphasis in religion, Spanish, music and home arts. Since the fusion on January 29, 1895, of the Hermanitas with the Daughters of Charity, the Colegio de la Inmaculada Concepción has always been managed by these Sisters.

The Philippine Revolution broke out in 1898. The Sisters helped the victims of the hostilities. In the account of The Revolt in Cebu 1898, Madrileña de la Cerna in her article “Some Sources on Women's Participation in the Revolution in Central and Eastern Visayas” writes:

In the 19th account, on the day of the attack on Good Friday, a bloody skirmish led the Visayan nuns of the Colegio de la Inmaculada Concepción of the Sisters of Charity (Spanish Congregation) to attend the wounded. The narrator described how the nuns personally dragged the wounded to the hospital, held vigil, without a fee, without regard to the color or background of the person as long as their altruistic mission was fulfilled.

With a very brief interruption during the Philippine Revolution in 1898, Inmaculada was soon offering other courses: Clase Preparatoria, Clase Media, Taquigrafía, Mecanografía, Piano, Canto, Pintura, Bordado y Labores. Spanish continued as the official language. When the Americans took over, Inmaculada provided the first public schools of the Visayan region with well-prepared teachers. In 1911, CIC started to offer elementary and secondary courses in English, with government recognition, turning out the first batch of high school graduates in 1923.

The Asociación de las Hijas de María (Association of the Children of Mary) was first organized on October 2, 1905, with Colegio de la Inmaculada Concepción as the first CoM Unit. Full-pledged membership was open to the older students or even teachers. The types of membership were Mary's Angels, Junior Aspirants, Senior Aspirants and Full-pledged members. Usually the Sister Servant or Superior was the Directora of the association.

The school publication, BLUE and WHITE came into existence on July 15, 1933, through the initiative of the principal, Sr. Constancia Marilao, and Miss Tomasa Gachapín (later Mrs. Jose Yulo) as the first editor.

November 3, 1935 saw the first alumnae reunion with Sor Fernanda Vañó, DC as its first coordinator. Since then the Homecoming Day became traditional.

In the first quarter of the twentieth century, Loring Larraquel de Victorino recalled that:

The following alumnae mostly Damas de la Caridad (Ladies of Charity) of Colegio de la Inmaculada Concepción were active in the service to the community. It was even said that these ex-alumnae were instrumental in the founding of “Asilo de la Milagrosa” then located at Calle Logarta. They were Doña Esperanza Vélez, Doña Mina Escaño, Doña Inday Rallos, Doña Carmen Sotto, Doña Beatriz Jereza, Doña Pilar Vañó de Escaño.

In the second and third quarter of the century another group of ex-alumni worked with Fr. Rahmann, SVD for the reconstruction of one wing of Asilo de la Milagrosa.

At the turn of the 1940s, Inmaculada was an impressive three-storey edifice with façade facing Calle Andrés de Urdaneta and wings embracing Mártires, La Solidaridad and Lapu-lapu streets. The curricular offerings through the initiative of Sor Paz San Buenaventura, D.C. were augmented to reach the tertiary level. Three collegiate courses were offered: a one-year Secretarial, a two-year Junior Normal, and Music Teacher's Junior course with government permit. Sor Fernanda Vañó was the first directress of music.

=== War years ===
At the outbreak of World War II on December 8, 1941, the following courses were being offered: Kindergarten, Elementary, Academic Secondary, Secretarial, Junior Normal, Home Economics, Elementary Course in Piano, Junior Course in Piano and Music Teacher's Diploma. Undaunted by the complete loss of its building and equipment during World War II, the school carried on with equal zeal. With a handful of primary children from the neighbourhood, the Sisters managed to re-open the elementary department and one-year Secretarial course during the Japanese occupation at ex-judge Juan Singson's house in Jakosalem Street. There, the “Lesser Inmaculada” did what it could until the American liberation forces took the Japanese by surprise on September 12, 1944.

In 1945, the elementary and high school classes were housed temporarily in Quonset huts at Gorordo Avenue. The temporary buildings of bamboo and nipa were donated by the 77th Infantry Division of the U.S. Armed Forces of the Far East (USAFFE). In 1946 the new Colegio de la Inmaculada Concepción, an impressive, two-storey structure, was completed on its present site on Avenida Gorordo. In July of the same year, the two-year Normal and one-year Secretarial courses were resumed.

By 1947, the following courses were recognized: Kindergarten, Elementary, Academic Secondary, Secretarial, Associate in Arts, Elementary Course in Piano, Junior Course in Piano, Music Teacher's Diploma. In the same year other collegiate courses were offered: Liberal Arts, Commerce and Home Economics. In succeeding years, these followed: Bachelor of Music major in Piano and Voice (1953) and Bachelor of Science in education. A cultural contribution was presented December 1957 with the inauguration of the imposing CIC Auditorium.

=== Further expansion ===
1964 was a significant and historical year for Inmaculada: The Philippine congregation of the Daughters of Charity ceased to be a sub-province of Spain and became independent Province with its own Visitatrix, Sr. Filómena Zulueta, D.C.

With this came the appointment in 1966 of Sr. Paz San Buenaventura as the first Filipino Sister Servant of Colegio de la Inmaculada Concepción.

With the progress of the community, the residents appealed to the Sisters to open a school that could undertake the job of providing their children with a Christian education. The Superior of Colegio de la Inmaculada Concepción, Sr. Paz San Buenaventura, took the initial steps to open a CIC Campus in Mandaue. A permit was obtained, and it formally opened on July 7, 1969. Sr. Imelda Espíritu was by then the new Superior. Classes started with 49 children in kindergarten. Since 1969, the CIC Mandaue City Campus gradually developed into a grade school, offering kindergarten, preparatory and primary classes from grades one to four. Grades five and six were opened consecutively in 1979 and 1980. With the opening of the intermediate grades, CIC Mandaue is now a complete elementary school. In school year 1999–2000, CIC Mandaue had its first high school graduation.

Expansion of Inmaculada's services to the community came hand in hand with the academics. In June 1968, the Sta. Luisa Social Action Center was opened to take charge of the material and spiritual needs of poor families living behind the school. Through the efforts of the CIC Alumnae Association, this small building expanded and was called the CIC Sta. Luisa Development Center, a two-storey building which houses the extensive school-community services. Inauguration date of CIC-SLDC was on September 27, 1967, feast day of St. Vincent de Paul, founder of the Daughters of Charity and patron of social work. At present, the center is called St. Louise de Marillac Foundation, Inc.

In 1975, the CIC Alumnae Association was formally registered as a juridical body with the Securities and Exchange Commission (SEC) with Felisa Yap de Chiongbian as president. Since then, it has become Inmaculada's dependable arm and generous sponsor in its school and community projects. Musical presentations have been sponsored, such as the Piano Concert of Reynaldo Reyes in the earlier days of the Sta. Luisa Center, the Concert of Sr. Ester B. Peña, DC, pianist, with the Manila Symphony Orchestra in 1977 and the 1982 September Affair featuring the pianist Joselito S. Pascual. The beneficiary of such concerts has been the CIC-Sta. Luisa Development Center, an ongoing project of the CIC Alumnae Association.

To assess the quality of instruction and amount of service to the community, Inmaculada applied for accreditation by the Philippine Accrediting Association of Schools, Colleges and Universities (PAASCU) in 1974. Formal accreditation was started in 1975 for the high school department and its Certificate of Accreditation was received on March 14, 1977.

Mother Teresa of Calcutta visited Inmaculada on February 7, 1977.

March 15, 1979 ushered in Inmaculada's Centennial Year Celebration. The week-long activities from March 10 to 16, 1980 were simple and impressive and in keeping with the awareness of the Vincentian Mission permeating the school. The most concrete Vincentian service is the Night High School Department established during the centennial year in 1980 — a most fitting gift to the community for the less-fortunate girls of Cebu.

December 2005–December 2006 saw another year-long thanksgiving and celebration for the gift of 125 years. “CIC-Cebu: 125 Years of Spirited Presence” was the theme.

Colegio de la Inmaculada Concepcion today offers Basic Education (Nursery to Grade 10) with the College Department phased out in 1998. This was to concentrate on the Christian formation of the young clientele. As an institution of learning, CIC has been undergoing accreditation by PAASCU since 1977. The institution also underwent a Congregational Evaluation Visit (CEV) in 1987, the first of its kind in Region 7 and a Congregational Mission Audit (CMA) in 2007.

Cognizant of the special role expected of the Catholic schools, CIC-Cebu takes the responsibility of building up the new breed of Filipinos — disciplined, nourished with positive nationalism, proud of the country's cultural heritage, builders of peace, respectful of the dignity of life and creation and citizens of the Church and of the country for a sustainable future.
