= TVJ Productions =

Philippine media production company

TVJ Productions, Inc.
- Company logo used since 2023
- Type: Private
- Industry: Entertainment
- Founded: June 7, 2023; 3 years ago
- Headquarters: TV5 Media Center, Reliance cor. Sheridan Sts., Mandaluyong City, Metro Manila, Philippines
- Key people: Manny Pangilinan (Co-owner); Vicente "Tito" Sotto III (Co-founder, CEO & Chairman); Marvic "Vic" Sotto (Officer in Charge); Jose Maria de Leon, Jr. (Treasurer); Victorico P. Vargas (President); Atty. Enrique "Buko" V. Dela Cruz (Legal Officer/Counsel)
- Products: Television programs
- Owner: MediaQuest Holdings Inc. (51%); Tito Sotto, Vic Sotto and Joey de Leon (49%)

TVJ Productions, Inc. is a Philippine media production company co-owned by Eat Bulaga! hosts Tito Sotto, Vic Sotto, and Joey de Leon (collectively known as "TVJ") and media company MediaQuest Holdings. The company was formed on June 7, 2023, after TVJ severed its ties with Television and Production Exponents, Inc. (TAPE), the former producer of Eat Bulaga! due to conflicts between TVJ and the new management.

== Projects ==
The current iteration of the Philippines' longest-running noontime variety and entertainment show Eat Bulaga!, co-produced by TVJ Productions and TV5, premiered on July 1, 2023, which replaced ABS-CBN Studios' noontime show It's Showtime's timeslot after it was moved to All TV, GMA Network and GTV. The show was then known by its placeholder title E.A.T., yet pending a trademark dispute between TAPE, Inc. and TVJ Productions which eventually concluded in favor of the latter.

In 2023, MediaQuest Holdings reportedly planned to bring the programs Wow Mali and Iskul Bukol to TV5, associated with Tito Sotto, Vic Sotto, and Joey de Leon. Wow Mali is a comedy gag show known for its candid humor, which aired on TV5 from 1996 to 2008 and again from 2009 to 2015, with De Leon as its main host. In its new version, Eat Bulaga! hosts Jose Manalo and Wally Bayola were set to appear in some episodes.

== Filmography ==
Television programs

- E.A.T... (2023–2024)
- Eat Bulaga! (2024–present)
- Eat Bulaga! Lenten Drama Specials (2024–present)
- Barangay Cinema Presents (2024)

== Ownership ==
As per Philstar.com, MediaQuest Holdings, a media conglomerate owned by Manny V. Pangilinan, through MQuest Ventures agreed to acquire more than half (51%), a majority of company shares of the production company owned by TVJ themselves.

- MediaQuest Holdings (MQuest Ventures) - 51%
- Tito Sotto, Vic Sotto, and Joey de Leon (TVJ) - 49%
