= Trops =

Philippine television drama series

- Title card
- Genre: Romance; Comedy drama
- Developed by: Jose Mari Abacan; Lia Domingo; Cyril Ramos; Jerome Zamora
- Written by: Robert Raz; Charlotte Dianco; Ma. Acy Ramos; Michelle Ngu
- Directed by: Linnet Zurbano
- Creative director: Jenny Ferre
- Starring: Kenneth Medrano; Miggy Tolentino; Joel Palencia; Jon Timmons; Tommy Peñaflor; Kim Last; Taki Saito
- Opening theme: "Ka-Trops" by Jireh Lim
- Country of origin: Philippines
- Original language: Tagalog
- No. of episodes: 238

Production
- Executive producer: Adrian Raphael V. Santos
- Producers: Antonio P. Tuviera; Jacqui L. Cara; Michael Tuviera; Jojo C. Oconer; Ramel L. David; Camille G. Montaño
- Production locations: Philippine School of Business Administration, Manila, Philippines; Quezon City, Philippines
- Editors: Bong Guillermo; Tara Illenberger
- Camera setup: Multiple-camera setup
- Running time: 15–30 minutes
- Production company: TAPE Inc.

Original release
- Network: GMA Network
- Release: October 24, 2016 – September 22, 2017

Trops (transl. Troupes) is a Philippine television drama romance comedy series, broadcast by GMA Network. Directed by Linnet Zurbano, it stars Kenneth Medrano, Miggy Tolentino, Joel Palencia, Jon Timmons, Tommy Peñaflor, Kim Last and Taki Saito. It premiered on October 24, 2016 on the network's morning line up. The series concluded on September 22, 2017, with a total of 238 episodes.

== Cast and characters ==
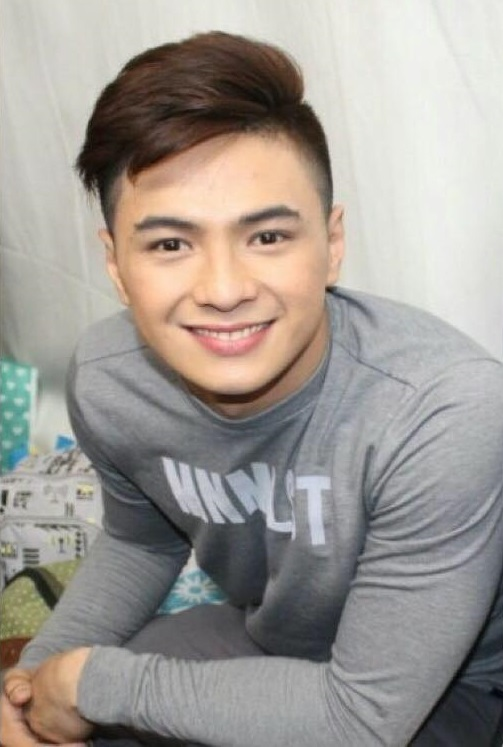
Kenneth Medrano portrays Ken Garcia Mercado.

Lead cast

- Taki Saito as Martha Tanya Kiera "Taki" P. Masson-Mercado
- Kenneth Medrano as Kenneth "Ken" Garcia-Mercado
- Miggy Tolentino as Angelo Miguelito "Miggy" Tolentino
- Kim Last as Kim Michael Park
- Tommy Peñaflor as Tommy "Taba" Fernando
- Joel Palencia as Joel "Jo" Santos
- Jon Timmons as Jonathan "Jon" P. Masson

Supporting cast

- Toni Aquino as Joanna "Liempo" Santos
- Krystal Reyes as Zoey Sevilla
- Shaira Diaz as Amanda "Mandy" Santiago-Tolentino
- Benjie Paras as Fred Fernando
- Irma Adlawan as Sheena "Momskie" Tolentino
- Rey "PJ" Abellana as Armando Santiago
- Juan Rodrigo as Kevin Mercado
- Dexter Doria as Armida Santiago
- Ces Quesada as Aurora Agoncilio
- Leo Martinez as Eli
- Allysa de Real as Sandra
- Jace Flores as Mars
- Archie Adamos as Bien

Guest cast

- Ai-Ai delas Alas as Rosa Mystica "Rose" Carpio Vda. de Roxas
- Ina Raymundo as Almalyn Macauba
- Glenda Garcia as Cecelia Celia Garcia-Mercado
- Maureen Mauricio as Rebecca Silangkuan
- Gilleth Sandico as Zita Sevilla
- Marco Alcaraz as Bastie
- Lou Veloso as Uge / Noy
- Ermie Concepcion as Ces
- Rolando Inocencio as Sarmiento
- Kate Lapuz as Pia Angelie Avela
- Francis Mata as Chua
- VJ Mendoza as a school pageant host
- Emma Viri as Sylvia Peneda-Masson
- Andrew Gan as Carlo
- Afi Africa as Kulote
- Rhett Romero as Zoey's father
- Myka Flores as Mariah
- Ryan Arana as Loren Jaime
- Therese Malvar as Veronica "Roni / Nica" Sanchez
- Kenken Nuyad as Renato "Nato" Monteza
- Yasser Marta as Drew
- Arvic Tan as Jacob Valdez
- Phytos Ramirez as Diego
- Jan Marini as Ces
- Jojo Alejar as Dindo Soterio
- Empress Schuck as Monette Soterio
- Super Tekla as Tiffany

== Ratings ==
According to AGB Nielsen Philippines' Mega Manila household television ratings, the pilot episode of Trops earned a 15.5% rating. The final episode scored a 4.1 rating in Nationwide Urban Television Audience Measurement People in television homes.
