= Juan Tamad (TV series) =

Philippine television sitcom series

- Title card
- Genre: Sitcom
- Based on: Juan Tamad
- Directed by: Soxie Topacio
- Starring: Sef Cadayona
- Country of origin: Philippines
- Original language: Tagalog
- No. of episodes: 29

Production
- Production locations: Quezon City, Philippines
- Camera setup: Multiple-camera setup
- Running time: 42 minutes
- Production company: GMA News and Public Affairs

Original release
- Network: GMA Network
- Release: August 23, 2015 – March 13, 2016

Juan Tamad (transl. Juan lazy) is a Philippine television sitcom series broadcast by GMA Network. Directed by Soxie Topacio, it stars Sef Cadayona in the title role. It premiered on August 23, 2015. The series concluded on March 13, 2016, with a total of 29 episodes.

The series is streaming online on YouTube.

== Cast and characters ==
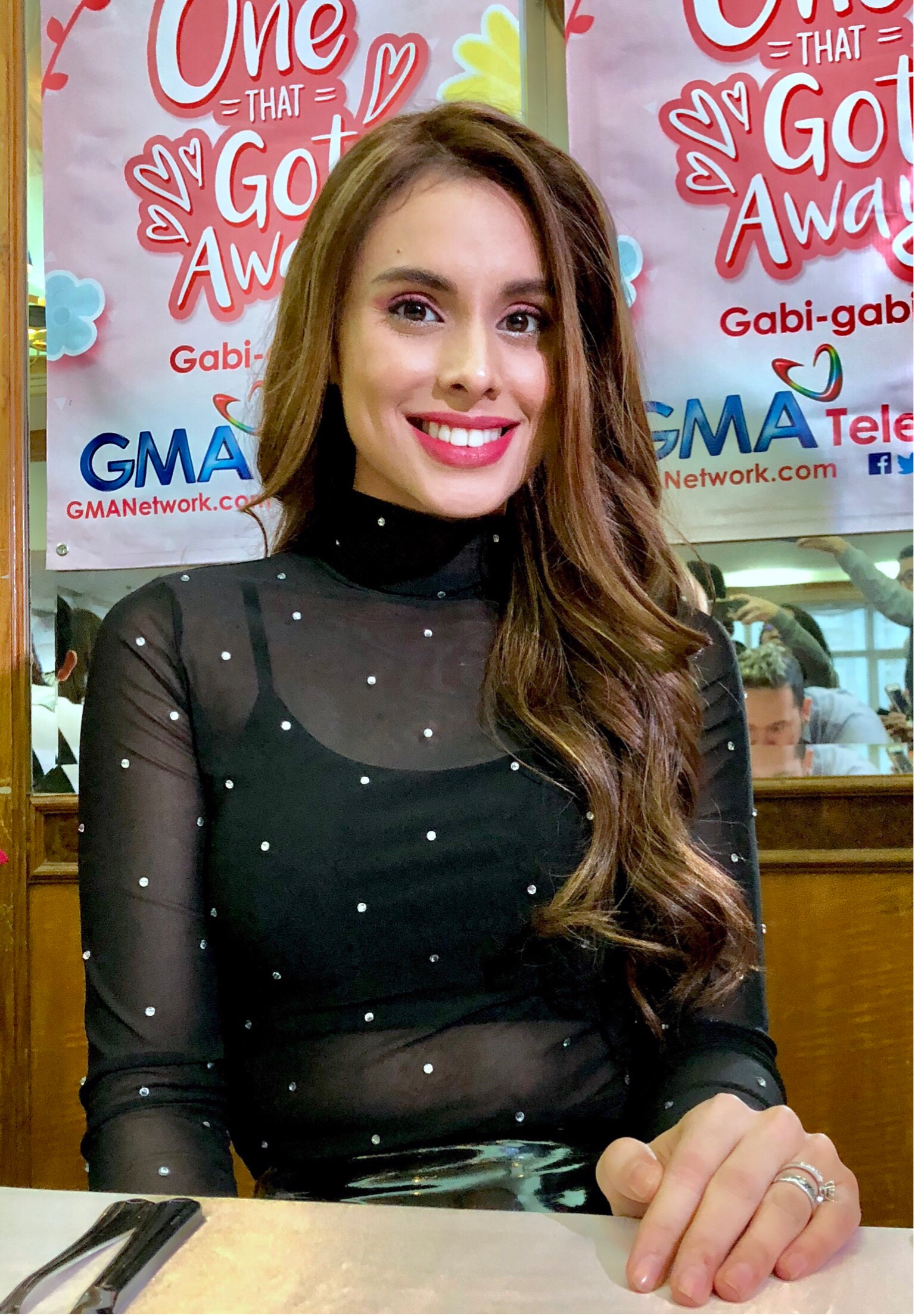
Max Collins portrays Marie Guiguinto.

Lead cast

- Sef Cadayona as Juan Damat-Magbangon

Supporting cast

- Max Collins as Marie Guiguinto
- Melanie Marquez as Candy Guiginto
- Carlos Agassi as Iggy Imperial
- Roi Vinzon as George Damat-Magbangon
- Marissa Sanchez as Siony Damat-Magbangon
- Gene Padilla as Steve Guiguinto
- Gab Bayan as Rocco Nachino
- Jon Timmons as TomDen Rodriguez
- Jhaykien Nuyad as Bernardo "Nards" Carpio
- Tommy Peñaflor as Mark Rehas
- Kim Last as Jepoy Bagalihog

Guest cast

- Valeen Montenegro as Mayumi
- Kim Rodriguez as Diw Diwata
- Jaclyn Jose as a recruiter
- Betong Sumaya as Guapple

== Ratings ==
According to AGB Nielsen Philippines' Mega Manila household television ratings, the pilot episode of Juan Tamad earned a 22.2% rating. The final episode scored a 10.6% rating.
