= Chelsea Academy =

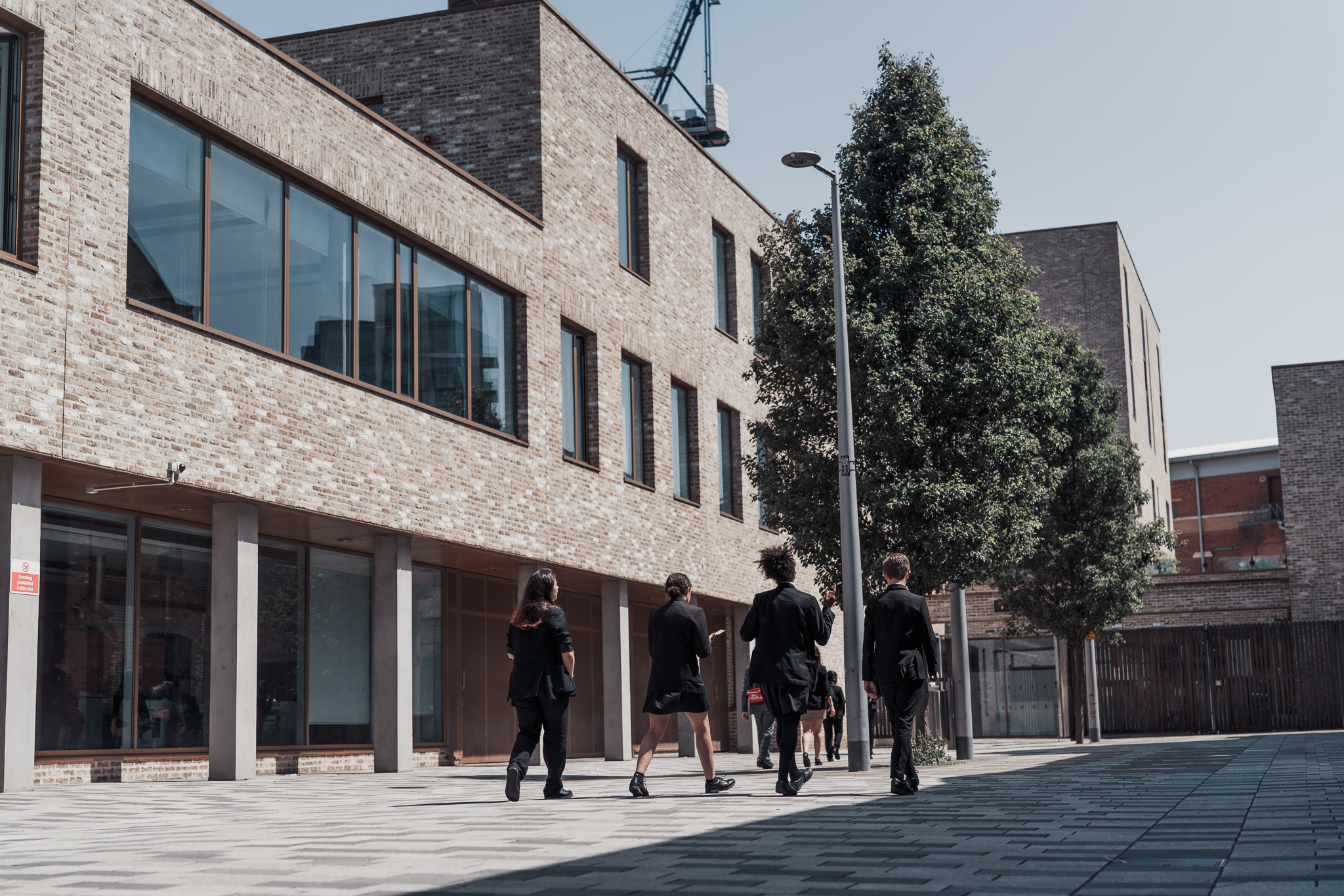
- Chelsea Academy; Secondary School

Location
- Lots Road; Chelsea, London, SW10 0AB; England; 51.47781°N 0.18312°W

Information
- Type: Academy
- Motto: Anchored in Christ
- Religious affiliation: Church of England
- Established: 2009
- Department for Education URN: 135531 Tables
- Ofsted: Reports
- Head teacher: Mariella Ardron
- Gender: Coeducational
- Age: 11 to 19
- Colours: Purple & black
- Website: chelsea-academy.org

Chelsea Academy is a coeducational Church of England secondary school and sixth form with academy status, located in the Chelsea area of the Royal Borough of Kensington and Chelsea in London, England.

The school was established in 2009 under the sponsorship of Diocese of London and Kensington and Chelsea London Borough Council. The school admits up to 10% of its intake in year 7 based on aptitude in music, while the remaining places are divided equally between applications from pupils with links to the church, and pupils from the immediate local community.

Chelsea Academy offers GCSEs and BTECs as programmes of study for pupils, while sixth form students can choose to study from range of A Levels. The school also has a specialism in Science.
