= Miggy Tolentino =

Filipino actor, model, and television personality

Sangguniang Kabataan Chairman of Barangay 34, Caloocan
- Incumbent
- Assumed office June 30, 2018

Personal details
- Born: Luis Miguel Evangelista Tolentino; April 20, 1996 (age 29) Caloocan, Philippines
- Education: Bachelor of Science in Business Administration
- Alma mater: Universidad de Manila
- Occupation: Actor; model; television personality; politician
- Known for: Trops as Miguelito "Miggy" Tolentino

Luis Miguel Evangelista Tolentino (born April 20, 1996), professionally known as Miggy Tolentino, is a Filipino actor, model, television personality and politician. He was a member of the dance group That's My Bae, which regularly appeared on the noontime variety show Eat Bulaga!.

== Career ==
Tolentino began his career as a model. In 2015, Eat Bulaga! launched a segment called That's My Bae: "Twerk It" Dance Contest where he became a finalist. He and other finalists, which formed the dance group That's My Bae, became a mainstay in the variety show until 2019. In 2016, the group starred in the television series Trops. In 2018, he won in the Sangguniang Kabataan elections.

== Personal life ==
Tolentio was involved in a basketball brawl with the referee in Maypajo, Caloocan City in 2017. In the heat of the argument, he took out a knife which was caught on CCTV camera, the incident was resolved after facing the complaints against him by attending the Baranggay settlement and making a public apology to the referee.

In 2018, Tolentino said, we all make mistakes and I'm not perfect.

== Filmography ==
=== Television ===
==== Non-episodic shows ====
Year	Title	Role
2015–present	Eat Bulaga!	Himself

==== Television series ====
Year	Title	Role
2017	Pepito Manaloto	Martin
2017	Hay, Bahay!	Migs
2017	Eat Bulaga's Lenten Presentation: Mansyon	Migoy Neruda
2016–2017	Trops	Miggy Tolentino
2016	Eat Bulaga's Lenten Presentation: Walang Kapalit	Carlo's Friend
2015–2016	Juan Tamad	Dan Ragondon
2024	Padyak Princess	Gregory "Dos" Madrid II
2025	Mga Batang Riles	Jasper

=== Film ===
Year	Title	Role
2017	Trip Ubusan: The Lolas Vs. Zombies	Will Robles
2016	My Bebe Love: #KiligPaMore	Himself (cameo)
