= Kenneth Medrano =

Filipino actor and TV personality (born 1991)

Kenneth Earl Medrano
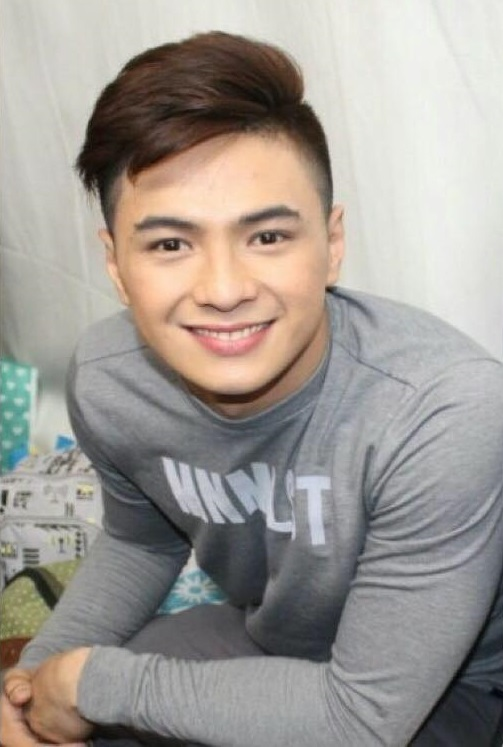
- Born: Kenneth Earl Gesulga Medrano; May 9, 1991 (age 34); Cebu City, Cebu, Philippines
- Other names: Bae Kenneth, KEM, Kenneth, K.E, Kentoy, Earl
- Education: Colegio de la Inmaculada Concepcion; University of Southern Philippines Foundation
- Occupations: Dancer, actor, television personality, model, dubsmash performer
- Years active: GMA Network (2015–2025); TV5 (2021–present)
- Known for: Dubsmash videos Dubsmash King of the Philippines; Eat Bulaga! (dancer and performer); Buena Familia as Pacoy Alvero; Calle Siete as Jonas Delloso; That's My Bae member
- Height: 1.83 m (6 ft 0 in)

Kenneth Earl Gesulga Medrano (born May 9, 1991) also known as Bae Kenneth, KEM or popularly known as Kenneth Medrano as his screen name is a Filipino television personality, model, dancer and actor. He is best known for his viral Dubsmash videos especially the song Twerk It Like Miley by Brandon Beal, thus naming him "The Philippines' King of Dubsmash," and his role as Pacoy Alvero in the afternoon's prime time drama Buena Familia on GMA Network and worldwide via GMA Pinoy TV. He gained fame after winning as the "Ultimate Bae Grand Winner" of That's My Bae: "Twerk It" Dance Contest on Eat Bulaga!. He is a member of Eat Bulaga!'s in-house dance group That's My Bae.

== Early life ==
Medrano was born and raised in Cebu City, Cebu Philippines to Anna Nimfa Gesulga and Glend Medrano. His mother is a government employee while his father is a retired navy and a teacher. He is the third child of four brothers namely Adriane Glen, Jerrick Karl, and Leuvick Jann. He finished his elementary education at Colegio de la Immaculada Concepcion. He finished his high school education and taking up a bachelor's degree in Hotel and Restaurant Management at the University of Southern Philippines Foundation (USPF) in Lahug, Cebu City. He started as a local talent of GMA Network in Cebu and a professional model on VAMP, a Cebu-based talent model agency. He also modeled on various local clothing lines in Cebu.

Before joining That's My Bae, Medrano was once worked as a bartender in a coffee shop in Cebu City, Coffee Prince Cebu.

In 2009, he tried to audition for the season 5 of StarStruck on GMA Network but he didn't make it on the next round of auditions.

== Career ==
=== Beginnings (2015): Twerk It Like Miley Dubsmash ===
In the early part of 2015, Medrano's career took off after he began posting dubsmash compilations on Facebook. A compilation in which he impersonates the cartoon character Johnny Bravo, songs of One Direction, Akon, Backstreet Boys, High School Musical, Westlife, Air Supply, Black Eyed Peas, Justin Bieber, the song "I'm an Albatraoz" by AronChupa and "Lay Me Down" by Sam Smith, local celebrities like Julia Barretto, scenes from the movie Maybe This Time by Sarah Geronimo and Coco Martin, The Love Affair by Richard Gomez and Dawn Zulueta, One More Chance by John Lloyd Cruz and Bea Alonzo, Forevermore (TV series) by Enrique Gil and Liza Soberano and also he do the transformation video of a popular detergent soap in the Philippines. He sings some of his favorite songs like "Kasalanan Ko Ba" by Neocolours, "Kunin Mo Na ang Lahat sa Akin" by Jeremiah and also he dances, all of the videos he posted online through social media.

Among all of his compilations, Medrano is the one who started to trend the dubsmash hit "Twerk It Like Miley" by Brandon Beal which he made went viral online with 2.6 million views overnight. He was featured on Kapuso Mo, Jessica Soho’s episode "Twerk It Like Miley". He earned the title "King of Dubsmash" in the Philippines. He dreamed that he will be featured and guest on an international TV show, The Ellen DeGeneres Show. He had the opportunity to collaborate with other well known Dubsmashers. He made a remake version of "Twerk It Like Miley" dubsmash together with the Dubsmash Queen Maine Mendoza.

Subsequently, Medrano recently posted his latest dubsmash version of Charlie Puth's song One Call Away on his Twitter account dedicated to all his fans.

=== That's My Bae: Twerk It Dance Contest ===
On 11 July 2015, Medrano joined That's My Bae: "Twerk It" Dance Contest, a segment on the longest running noontime show Eat Bulaga! airing on GMA Network. On his joining to the contest, Medrano is known already by many people because of the viral video he made and is the key and opened opportunities for him to become an artist. Among a thousand men auditioned the contest, he makes it to the semi-finals until he reached into the grand finals. On 29 August 2015, there are seven grand finalists left on the competition. He joined with his fellow bae colleagues in the contest with Miggy Tolentino, Joel Palencia, Gab Bayan, Tommy Peñaflor, Jon Timmons and Kim Last. His personality, looks, and dance moves have a great impact and potential to his life that the audience and the judges like him. He was declared as the "Ultimate Bae Grand Winner". He received P250,000 as the grand prize and also included in PLDT Home Ultera's list of brand ambassadors. Medrano also chosen as the "Ultimate Bae Dabarkads People’s Choice Award" by people's text votes and likes on his picture posted by Eat Bulaga!'s Facebook page. Subsequently, Medrano and the rest of his bae colleagues are regularly seen and performed daily on Eat Bulaga!. In September 2015, Medrano and the rest of his bae colleagues gave a segment on Eat Bulaga! entitled "ATM with the BAES". In January 2016, the segment was changed into "Dancing in Tandem" on which he is one of the judges together with his fellow bae colleague Kim Last and later the segment was changed into "Hotline Bae" in February 2016.

=== Acting career ===
After winning as the Ultimate Bae Grand Winner of That's My Bae: Twerk It Dance Contest on Eat Bulaga!, Medrano undergoes a series of acting workshops under with Ana Feleo. He subsequently guests and appears on different shows on GMA Network and GMA News TV. In September 2015, Medrano was part of the supporting cast on which he portrays one of the protagonists, as Pacoy Alvero on afternoon's prime time Buena Familia on GMA Network. This makes him as his first appearance in an actual teleserye and his debut acting career. Pacoy (Medrano) together with Harry, character which portrayed by Martin del Rosario are the two men who are rivals and battles in Celine's heart which portrayed by Kylie Padilla. He appeared as a guest star in the TV sitcom Ismol Family. He also appeared on a true to life love story drama on Wagas aired on GMA News TV which he portrays George, an ordinary poor unemployed man and security guard which is in love with a rich girl named Belle which portrayed by Kylie Padilla. In December 2015, he made also a 'cameo role' on the movie My Bebe Love: #KiligPaMore, a Filipino romantic comedy film entry for the 2015 Metro Manila Film Festival which starred Vic Sotto and Ai-Ai de las Alas with Alden Richards and Maine Mendoza. In February 2016, he appeared on Eat Bulaga's segment KalyeSerye on which he portrayed the character named Pepito, a farmer and the cousin of young Anselmo which is one of Lola Nidora's love interests during her younger days in 1945. Both of these characters are portrayed by Alden Richards and Maine Mendoza. Even though he appears in GMA, he is not a member of the GMA Artist Center. His career is being managed by Senior Vice President and COO of TAPE Inc. executive Malou Choa-Fagar who is the executive producer of Eat Bulaga!.

In March 2016, Medrano starred as Carlo in a Lenten drama presentation of Eat Bulaga entitled Walang Kapalit, where he was nominated as Best Supporting Actor & Breakthrough Artist Award for his acting performance during the Eat Bulaga's 3rd Dabarkads Awards held on April 2, 2016.

Recently, Medrano included as one of the casts of the teleserye produced by TAPE Inc. entitled Calle Siete on which he portrays the role of Jonas Delloso, together with Ryzza Mae Dizon, Eula Valdez and Christian Vasquez as the main casts of the show. On January 1, 2022, Medrano is the new voice narrator of the flagship AM-station DZRH by replacing Dennis Antenor Jr. with new programs. Along with a Risk-Free Trial version via Easy TV Home Super Digibox.

== Personal life ==
Medrano is known for his numerous tattoos on both his upper chest and on his upper right shoulder.

In 2026, Medrano disclosed that he had been diagnosed with testicular cancer.

== Filmography ==
=== Film ===
Year	Title	Role	Result
2015	My Bebe Love: #KiligPaMore	Cameo Role	
2017	Trip Ubusan: The Lolas vs. Zombies	Aladin Galvez	Nominated

=== Television ===
Year	Title	Role
2015	Wagas: Langit at Lupa	George
2015	Ismol Family	Benjamin
2015–2016	Buena Familia	Pacoy Alvero
2015–2019	Eat Bulaga!	Himself
2015	The Half Sisters	Atty. Rodel Dimaano
2016	Eat Bulaga Lenten Special: Walang Kapalit	Carlo
2016	Calle Siete	Jonas Delloso
2016–2017	Trops	Kenneth Mercado
2017	Magpakailanman: #LoveKnowNoAge	Gil Moreno Jr.
2017	Eat Bulaga's Lenten Special Presents: Pagpapatawad	Carlo Dela Rosa
2017	Magpakailanman: Reyna ng Tubig: The Jay Kummer "Dodoy" Teberio Story	Alvin
2017	Tadhana: Sundo	Pio
2017	Dear Uge: Torn Between Beshies	Ron
2019	One of the Baes	Gary Balencia
2020	Carpool	Terence

== Awards and nominations ==
Year	Association	Category	Result
2015	Social Media TV Poll (SMTVP)	Most New Handsome Face	Won
2016	Social Media TV Poll (SMTVP)	Best New Male TV Personality	Won
