= 30th PMPC Star Awards for Television =

- Date: October 23, 2016; November 20, 2016 (Delayed Telecast on ABS-CBN's Sunday's Best)
- Location: Monet Grand Ballroom, Novotel Manila Araneta Center, Cubao, Quezon City
- Hosted by: Robi Domingo; Alex Gonzaga; Luis Manzano; Jodi Sta. Maria; Kim Chiu; Xian Lim

Television/radio coverage
- Network: ABS-CBN
- Produced by: Airtime Marketing Philippines, Inc.
- Directed by: Bert de Leon

The 30th PMPC Star Awards for Television awards ceremony (also known as the integral part of the 2016 Star For M-TV Awards, with the theme The Fusion of Philippine Entertainment's Best) was held on October 23, 2016 at the Monet Grand Ballroom, Novotel Manila Araneta Center, Cubao, Quezon City, coinciding with the 63rd anniversary of the birth of Philippine television. The awards will be given to selected programs and personalities ranging from actors, actresses, hosts and news and current affairs personalities who have made a mark in Philippine television in the past year. The awards night was hosted by ABS-CBN personalities Robi Domingo, Kim Chiu, Luis Manzano, Jodi Sta. Maria, Alex Gonzaga and Xian Lim with Elisse Joson and Arjo Atayde as segment hosts and performances from Sam Concepcion, Jason Dy, and 4th Impact.

The awards will be organized by the Philippine Movie Press Club, a non-profit organization whose members are entertainment writers and columnists from newspapers and online news sites. The PMPC is currently headed by its president, and overall awards chairman Fernan de Guzman. The telecast of the Star Awards for Television will be produced by Airtime Marketing Philippines, Inc. of Tessie Celestino-Howard and under the direction of Bert de Leon. It aired on a delayed basis on ABS-CBN's "Sunday's Best" on November 20, 2016.

== Nominees and winners ==
Here is the full set of nominees (in alphabetical order) and winners of the 30th PMPC Star Awards for Television.

Winners are listed first and highlighted with boldface.

=== Stations ===
Best TV Station

Winner: **ABS-CBN** (Channel 2)

- AksyonTV (Channel 41)
- BEAM (Channel 31)
- CNN Philippines (Channel 9)
- GMA 7 (Channel 7)
- GMA News TV (Channel 11)
- IBC 13 (Channel 13)
- Light Network (Channel 33)
- Net 25 (Channel 25)
- PTV 4 (Channel 4)
- RJTV (Channel 29)
- SBN (Channel 21)
- S+A (Channel 23)
- TV5 (Channel 5)
- UNTV News and Rescue (Channel 37)

=== Programs ===
Best Primetime Drama Series	Best Daytime Drama Series
Winner: **FPJ's Ang Probinsyano** (ABS-CBN): Dolce Amore (ABS-CBN); My Faithful Husband (GMA 7); On the Wings of Love (ABS-CBN); Poor Señorita (GMA 7); The Story of Us (ABS-CBN); You're My Home (ABS-CBN)	Winner: **Doble Kara** (ABS-CBN): All of Me (ABS-CBN); Be My Lady (ABS-CBN); Destiny Rose (GMA 7); Ningning (ABS-CBN); Sa Piling ni Nanay (GMA 7); Tubig at Langis (ABS-CBN)
Best Drama Anthology	Best Public Service Program
Winner: **Ipaglaban Mo!** (ABS-CBN): Karelasyon (GMA 7); Magpakailanman (GMA 7); Maynila (GMA 7); Wagas (GMA News TV)	Winner: **Buhay OFW** (AksyonTV) and **Mission Possible** (ABS-CBN) (tied): Alisto! (GMA 7); Imbestigador (GMA 7); Salamat Dok (ABS-CBN); S.O.C.O. (Scene of the Crime Operatives) (ABS-CBN); Wish Ko Lang (GMA 7)
Best Gag Show	Best Comedy Program
Winner: **Goin' Bulilit** (ABS-CBN): Banana Sundae (ABS-CBN); Hapi ang Buhay (Net 25)	Winner: **Pepito Manaloto: Ang Tunay na Kwento** (GMA 7): A1 Ko Sa 'Yo (GMA 7); Conan, My Beautician (GMA 7); Hay, Bahay! (GMA 7); Home Sweetie Home (ABS-CBN); Ismol Family (GMA 7); Vampire Ang Daddy Ko (GMA 7)
Best Musical Variety Show	Best Variety Show
Winner: **ASAP** (ABS-CBN): Letters and Music (Net 25); Sessions on 25th Street (Net 25); Walang Tulugan with the Master Showman (GMA 7)	Winner: **Sunday PinaSaya** (GMA 7): It's Showtime (ABS-CBN)
Best Game Show	Best Talent Search Program
Winner: **Wowowin** (GMA 7): Celebrity Bluff (GMA 7); Celebrity Playtime (ABS-CBN); HAPPinas Happy Hour (TV5); Laff, Camera, Action! (GMA 7)	Winner: **StarStruck (season 6)** (GMA 7): ASOP: A Song of Praise Music Festival (UNTV News and Rescue); Born to Be a Star (TV5); Dance Kids (ABS-CBN); I Love OPM (ABS-CBN); We Love OPM: The Celebrity Sing-offs (ABS-CBN)
Best Educational Program	Best Celebrity Talk Show
Winner: **Matanglawin** (ABS-CBN): AHA! (GMA 7); Born to Be Wild (GMA 7); Convergence (Net 25); Healthcetera (GMA News TV); Idol sa Kusina (GMA News TV); Sarap with Family (GMA News TV)	Winner: **Tonight with Boy Abunda** (ABS-CBN): Gandang Gabi Vice (ABS-CBN); Magandang Buhay (ABS-CBN); Mars (GMA News TV); Moments (Net 25); Real Talk (CNN Philippines); Sarap Diva (GMA 7)
Best Documentary Program	Best Documentary Special
Winner: **Reel Time** (GMA News TV): Front Row (GMA 7); History with Lourd (TV5); I-Witness (GMA 7); Motorcycle Diaries (GMA News TV); Reporter's Notebook (GMA 7); The Veronica Chronicles (PTV 4)	Winner: **Politika at Pamilya: Sila-Sila Noon, Sila-Sila Pa Rin Hanggang Ngayon** (ABS-CBN) (Airing Date: May 29, 2016): EDSA: 30 Taon (ABS-CBN) (Airing Date: February 28, 2016); Guro To Pangulo: Ang Buhay ni Elpidio Quirino (ABS-CBN) (Airing Date: January 10, 2016); Wanted: President (GMA 7) (Airing Dates: January 24, January 31 and February 7, 2016); Warmer (ABS-CBN News Channel) (Airing Date: March 10–11, 2016)
Best Magazine Show	Best News Program
Winner: **Rated K** (ABS-CBN): Ang Pinaka (GMA News TV); Good News Kasama si Vicky Morales (GMA News TV); iJuander (GMA News TV); Kapuso Mo, Jessica Soho (GMA 7); Pop Talk (GMA News TV); Power House (GMA 7)	Winner: **TV Patrol** (ABS-CBN) and **24 Oras** (GMA 7) (tied): Balitanghali (GMA News TV); Balitaan (CNN Philippines); Bandila (ABS-CBN); Saksi (GMA 7); State of the Nation with Jessica Soho (GMA News TV)
Best Morning Show	Best Public Affairs Program
Winner: **Unang Hirit** (GMA 7): Good Morning Kuya (UNTV News and Rescue); Good Morning Pilipinas (PTV 4); Masayang Umaga Po! (Net 25); Pambansang Almusal (Net 25); Umagang Kay Ganda (ABS-CBN)	Winner: **The Bottomline with Boy Abunda** (ABS-CBN): Get It Straight with Daniel Razon (UNTV News and Rescue); Kwatrobersyal (PTV 4); Liwanagin Natin ni Ka Totoy Talastas (Net 25); PTV Special Forum (PTV 4); Reaksyon (TV5); Tapatan ni Tunying (ABS-CBN)
Best Travel Show	Best Lifestyle Show
Winner: **Biyahe ni Drew** (GMA News TV): Bridging Borders (PTV 4); Buhay Pinoy (PTV 4); Landmarks (Net 25); Tripinas (GMA News TV)	Winner: **RX Plus** (S+A): Gandang Ricky Reyes (GMA News TV); Kris TV (ABS-CBN); Leading Women (CNN Philippines); Sports U (ABS-CBN); Taste Buddies (GMA News TV)

=== Personalities ===
Best Drama Actor	Best Drama Actress
Winner: **Coco Martin** (FPJ's Ang Probinsyano) (ABS-CBN): Dennis Trillo (My Faithful Husband) (GMA 7); Enrique Gil (Dolce Amore) (ABS-CBN); James Reid (On the Wings of Love) (ABS-CBN); Ken Chan (Destiny Rose) (GMA 7); Richard Gomez (You're My Home) (ABS-CBN); Xian Lim (The Story of Us) (ABS-CBN)	Winner: **Jennylyn Mercado** (My Faithful Husband) (GMA 7): Dawn Zulueta (You're My Home) (ABS-CBN); Heart Evangelista (Beautiful Strangers) (GMA 7); Julia Montes (Doble Kara) (ABS-CBN); Kim Chiu (The Story of Us) (ABS-CBN); Liza Soberano (Dolce Amore) (ABS-CBN); Nadine Lustre (On the Wings of Love) (ABS-CBN)
Best Drama Supporting Actor	Best Drama Supporting Actress
Winner: **Arjo Atayde** (FPJ's Ang Probinsyano) and **Aaron Villaflor** (All of Me) (ABS-CBN) (tied): Albert Martinez (FPJ's Ang Probinsyano) (ABS-CBN); Carlo Aquino (We Will Survive) (ABS-CBN); Christopher de Leon (Beautiful Strangers) (GMA 7); Eddie Garcia (FPJ's Ang Probinsyano) (ABS-CBN); Matteo Guidicelli (Dolce Amore) (ABS-CBN)	Winner: **Sunshine Dizon** (Little Nanay) (GMA-7): Carmina Villarroel (Doble Kara) (ABS-CBN); Cherie Gil (Dolce Amore) (ABS-CBN); Manilyn Reynes (Destiny Rose) (GMA 7); Snooky Serna (My Faithful Husband) (GMA 7); Sunshine Cruz (Dolce Amore) (ABS-CBN); Susan Roces (FPJ's Ang Probinsyano) (ABS-CBN); Sylvia Sanchez (Ningning) (ABS-CBN)
Best Single Performance by an Actor	Best Single Performance by an Actress
Winner: **Kristofer Martin** (Magpakailanman episode: "Mag-Ama sa Bilangguan") (GMA 7): Alden Richards (Eat Bulaga! Lenten Drama Special: "God Gave Me You") (GMA 7); Gardo Versoza (Maalaala Mo Kaya (MMK) episode: "Itak") (ABS-CBN); Gerald Anderson (MMK episode: "Class Picture") (ABS-CBN); Joel Torre (MMK episode: "Kahon") (ABS-CBN); John Arcilla (Magpakailanman episode: "Mag-Ama sa Bilangguan") (GMA 7); Zanjoe Marudo (MMK episode: "Kuweba") (ABS-CBN)	Winner: **Claudine Barretto** (MMK episode: "Itak") (ABS-CBN): Aiko Melendez (MMK episode: "Lubid") (ABS-CBN); Coney Reyes (MMK episode: "Gasa") (ABS-CBN); Jaclyn Jose (Karelasyon episode: "Dahas") (GMA 7); Miel Espinosa (MMK episode: "Picture") (ABS-CBN); Nora Aunor (MMK episode: "Kahon") (ABS-CBN); Shaina Magdayao (MMK episode: "Picture") (ABS-CBN)
Best Child Performer	Best Public Service Program Host
Winner: **McNeal "Aura" Briguela** (FPJ's Ang Probinsyano) (ABS-CBN): Alonzo Muhlach (Ang Panday) (TV5); Jana Agoncillo (Ningning) (ABS-CBN); John Steven de Guzman (Ningning) (ABS-CBN); Marco Masa (My Super D) (ABS-CBN); Miggs Cuaderno (Poor Senorita) (GMA 7); Onyok Pineda (FPJ's Ang Probinsyano) (ABS-CBN); Ryzza Mae Dizon (Princess in the Palace) (GMA 7)	Winner: **Julius Babao** (Mission Possible) (ABS-CBN): Alvin Elchico and Bernadette Sembrano-Aguinaldo (Salamat Dok) (ABS-CBN); Arnold Clavio (Alisto!) (GMA 7); Gus Abelgas (S.O.C.O. (Scene of the Crime Operatives) ) (ABS-CBN); Mike Enriquez (Imbestigador) (GMA 7); Ted Failon (Failon Ngayon) (ABS-CBN); Vicky Morales (Wish Ko Lang) (GMA 7)
Best New Male TV Personality	Best New Female TV Personality
Winner: **Onyok Pineda** (FPJ's Ang Probinsyano) (ABS-CBN) and **Jake Ejercito** (Eat Bulaga! Lenten Drama Special: "God Gave Me You") (GMA 7) (tied): Alfonso Ynigo (MMK episode: "Kuweba") (ABS-CBN); Sebastian Benedict "Baste" Granfon (Eat Bulaga!) (GMA 7); Bailey May (On the Wings of Love) (ABS-CBN); Nikko Natividad (It's Showtime) (ABS-CBN); Ronnie Alonte (MMK episode: "Motorsiklo") (ABS-CBN); Shaun Salvador (#ParangNormalActivity) (TV5)	Winner: **Ria Atayde** (MMK episode: "Puno ng Mangga") (ABS-CBN): Ayra Mariano (Poor Senorita) (GMA 7); Dawn Chang (MMK episode: "Kuweba") (ABS-CBN); Kira Balinger (The Story of Us) (ABS-CBN); Miho Nishida (It's Showtime) (ABS-CBN); Taki Saito (#ParangNormalActivity) (TV5); Ylona Garcia (On the Wings of Love) (ABS-CBN); Ysabel Ortega (Born for You) (ABS-CBN)
Best Comedy Actor	Best Comedy Actress
Winner: **Jose Manalo** (Hay, Bahay!) (GMA 7): Jayson Gainza (Banana Sundae) (ABS-CBN); John Lloyd Cruz (Home Sweetie Home) (ABS-CBN); Michael V. (Pepito Manaloto: Ang Tunay na Kwento) (GMA-7); Pooh (Banana Sundae) (ABS-CBN); Vic Sotto (Vampire Ang Daddy Ko) (GMA 7); Wally Bayola (Hay, Bahay!) (GMA 7)	Winner: **Manilyn Reynes** (Pepito Manaloto: Ang Tunay na Kwento) (GMA 7): Ai Ai delas Alas (Hay, Bahay!) (GMA 7); Angelica Panganiban (Banana Sundae) (ABS-CBN); Nova Villa (Pepito Manaloto: Ang Tunay na Kwento) (GMA 7); Pokwang (Banana Sundae) (ABS-CBN); Rufa Mae Quinto (Bubble Gang) (GMA-7); Toni Gonzaga (Home Sweetie Home) (ABS-CBN)
Best Male TV Host	Best Female TV Host
Winner: **Luis Manzano** (ASAP) (ABS-CBN): Billy Crawford (It's Showtime) (ABS-CBN); Piolo Pascual (ASAP) (ABS-CBN); Robi Domingo (ASAP) (ABS-CBN); Ryan Agoncillo (Eat Bulaga!) (GMA 7); Vic Sotto (Eat Bulaga!) (GMA 7); Vice Ganda (It's Showtime) (ABS-CBN)	Winner: **Anne Curtis** (It's Showtime) (ABS-CBN): Amy Perez (It's Showtime) (ABS-CBN); Jolina Magdangal (ASAP) (ABS-CBN); Karylle (It's Showtime) (ABS-CBN); Marian Rivera (Sunday PinaSaya) (GMA 7); Pia Guanio (Eat Bulaga!) (GMA 7); Toni Gonzaga (ASAP) (ABS-CBN 2)
Best Game Show Host(s)	Best Talent Search Program Host(s)
Winner: **Luis Manzano** (Kapamilya, Deal or No Deal) (ABS-CBN): Betong Sumaya and Sheena Halili (Laff, Camera, Action!) (GMA 7); Billy Crawford (Celebrity Playtime) (ABS-CBN); Eugene Domingo, and Jose Manalo (Celebrity Bluff) (GMA 7); Ogie Alcasid, Janno Gibbs', and Tuesday Vargas (HAPPinas Happy Hour) (TV5); Willie Revillame (Wowowin) (GMA 7)	Winner: **Luis Manzano**, **Robi Domingo** and **Kim Chiu** (The Voice Kids (season 3)) (ABS-CBN): Anne Curtis and Eric Nicolas (I Love OPM) (ABS-CBN); Dingdong Dantes and Megan Young (Starstruck (season 6)) (GMA 7); Luis Manzano and Billy Crawford (Pilipinas Got Talent (season 5)) (ABS-CBN); Robi Domingo and Alex Gonzaga (Dance Kids) (ABS-CBN); Ogie Alcasid and Yassi Pressman (Born to Be a Star) (TV5); Toni Rose Gayda and Richard Reynoso (ASOP: A Song of Praise Music Festival) (UNTV News and Rescue)
Best Educational Program Host(s)	Best Celebrity Talk Show Host(s)
Winner: **Kuya Kim Atienza** (Matanglawin) (ABS-CBN): Chef Boy Logro (Idol sa Kusina) (GMA News TV); Chris Tiu (IBilib) (GMA 7); Dr. Ferds Recio, and Dr. Nielsen Donato (Born to Be Wild) (GMA 7); Drs. Manny and Pie Calayan (Healthcetera) (GMA News TV); Drew Arellano (AHA!) (GMA 7); Jennylyn Mercado (Sarap with Family) (GMA News TV)	Winner: **Boy Abunda** (Tonight with Boy Abunda) (ABS-CBN): Camille Prats, and Suzi Entrata-Abrera (Mars) (GMA News TV); Christine Jacob-Sandejas, Giselle Sanchez-Buencamino, Shamcey Supsup-Lee, and Rachel Alejandro (Real Talk) (CNN Philippines); Gladys Reyes-Sommereux (Moments) (Net 25); Karla Estrada, Jolina Magdangal-Escueta, and Melai Cantiveros-Francisco (Magandang Buhay) (ABS-CBN); Regine Velasquez-Alcasid (Sarap Diva) (GMA 7); Vice Ganda (Gandang Gabi Vice) (ABS-CBN)
Best Documentary Program Host(s)	Best Magazine Show Host(s)
Winner: **Malou Mangahas** (Investigative Documentaries) (GMA News TV): Jay Taruc (Motorcycle Diaries) (GMA News TV); Lourd de Veyra (History with Lourd) (TV5); Maki Pulido, and Raffy Tima (Reporter's Notebook) (GMA 7); Rhea Santos (Tunay Na Buhay) (GMA 7); Sandra Aguinaldo, and Kara David (I-Witness) (GMA 7); Veronica Baluyut Jimenez (The Veronica Chronicles) (PTV 4)	Winner: **Korina Sanchez-Roxas** (Rated K) (ABS-CBN): Jessica Soho (Kapuso Mo, Jessica Soho) (GMA 7); Kara David (Powerhouse) (GMA 7); Rovilson Fernandez (Ang Pinaka) (GMA News TV); Susan Enriquez, and Cesar Apolinario (iJuander) (GMA News TV); Tonipet Gaba (Pop Talk) (GMA News TV); Vicky Morales, Bea Binene, and Love Añover (Good News Kasama si Vicky Morales) (GMA News TV)
Best Male Newscaster	Best Female Newscaster
Winner: **Erwin Tulfo** (Aksyon Prime) (TV5): Arnold Clavio (Saksi) (GMA 7); Julius Babao (Bandila) (ABS-CBN); Mike Enriquez (24 Oras) (GMA 7); Noli de Castro (TV Patrol) (ABS-CBN); Raffy Tulfo (Aksyon sa Tanghali) (TV5); Ted Failon (TV Patrol) (ABS-CBN)	Winner: **Vicky Morales** (24 Oras) (GMA 7): Bernadette Sembrano (TV Patrol) (ABS-CBN); Jessica Soho (State of the Nation with Jessica Soho) (GMA News TV); Karen Davila (Bandila) (ABS-CBN); Luchi Cruz-Valdes (Aksyon Prime) (TV5); Mel Tiangco (24 Oras) (GMA 7); Pia Arcangel (Saksi) (GMA 7); Pinky Webb (Balitaan) (CNN Philippines)
Best Morning Show Hosts	Best Public Affairs Program Host(s)
Winner: **Umagang Kay Ganda hosts** (ABS-CBN): **Anthony Taberna**, **Jorge Cariño**, **Atom Araullo**, **Amy Perez**, **Ariel Ureta**, **Winnie Cordero**, and **Gretchen Ho**: Good Morning Kuya hosts (UNTV News and Rescue): Kuya Daniel Razon, Atty. Erin Tañada III, Diego Castro III, Angela Lagunzad, Rheena Villamor, Monica Verallo, Thalia Javier, Erica "Kikay" Honrado, Atty. Regie Tongol, Jun Soriao, Dr. Harris Acero, Dr. Sarah Barba-Cabodil, Dr. Janis de Vera, Dr. Pebbles Antonio, Dr. Joseph Lee, and Dr. Bong Santiago; Good Morning Pilipinas hosts (PTV 4): Jules Guiang, Diane Querrer, and Aljo Bendijo; Masayang Umaga Po hosts (Net 25): Leo Martinez, Andrea Bardos, Phoebe Publico, and Alyssa Cruz; Pambansang Almusal hosts (Net 25): Apple Chiu, Bob Crisostomo, Chadleen Lacdo-o, Tristan Bayani, Nicole Facal, Carmela Magtuto-Navarro, Kath Magtuto-Mangahas, Davey Langit, Aikee Aplicador, Nathan Manzo, Nicole Ching, Richard Quan, and Regine Angeles; Unang Hirit hosts (GMA 7): Arnold Clavio, Rhea Santos, Ivan Mayrina, Connie Sison, Susan Enriquez, Nathaniel "Mang Tani" Cruz, Lyn Ching-Pascual, Lhar Santiago, Suzi Entrata-Abrera, and Love Añover	Winner: **Boy Abunda** (The Bottomline with Boy Abunda) (ABS-CBN): Anthony Taberna (Tapatan ni Tunying) (ABS-CBN); Daniel Razon (Get It Straight with Daniel Razon) (UNTV News and Rescue); Gio Tingson Kathy San Gabriel and Kirby Cristobal (PTV Special Forum) (PTV 4); Luchi Cruz-Valdes (Reaksyon) (TV5); Ka Totoy Talastas, and Weng dela Fuente (Liwanagin Natin ni Ka Totoy Talastas) (Net 25); Veronica Baluyut Jimenez (Kwatrobersyal) (PTV 4)
Best Travel Show Host(s)	Best Lifestyle Show Host
Winner: **Drew Arellano** (Biyahe ni Drew) (GMA News TV): Dolly Malgapo, Faye de Castro-Umandal, Indra Cepeda and Nikki Dino (Landmarks) (Net 25); Jaimie Cruz and Patty Santos (Buhay Pinoy) (PTV 4); Solenn Heussaff and Stephen Tagud (Tripinas) (GMA News TV); Veronica Baluyut Jimenez (Bridging Borders) (PTV 4)	Winner: **Ricky Reyes** (Gandang Ricky Reyes) (GMA News TV): Angel Jacob (Leading Women) (CNN Philippines); Dr. Cecil Catapang (RX Plus) (S+A); Dyan Castillejo (Sports U) (ABS-CBN); Kris Aquino (Kris TV) (ABS-CBN 2)

=== Rundown ===
Number of Nominees

Network	Total #
ABS-CBN	126
ABS-CBN News Channel	1
AksyonTV	2
CNN Philippines	7
GMA 7	78
GMA News TV	32
IBC 13	1
Net 25	14
PTV 4	15
S+A	3
TV5	15
UNTV News and Rescue	5

Number of Winners (excluding Special Awards)

Network	Total #
ABS-CBN	30
GMA	13
GMA News TV	5
TV5	1
Aksyon TV	1
S+A	1

== Special awards ==
=== Ading Fernando Lifetime Achievement Award ===
- Maricel Soriano (The Diamond Star of Philippine Entertainment)

=== Excellence in Broadcasting Award ===
- Kirby Cristobal (Male)
- Luchi Cruz-Valdes (Female) (Head of News5, TV5's news and information arm, anchor of Aksyon Prime, former RPN, GMA and ABS-CBN News personality)

=== German Moreno Power Tandem Award ===
- Kim Chiu and Xian Lim (KimXi)

=== Stars of the Night ===
- Luis Manzano (Male)
- Yassi Pressman (Female)

== See also ==
- PMPC Star Awards for Television
- 2016 in Philippine television
- 8th PMPC Star Awards for Music
