= 20th PMPC Star Awards for Television =

- Date: October 23, 2006
- Location: UP Theater, Quezon City
- Hosted by: Boy Abunda; Tin Tin Bersola-Babao; Jean Garcia; Toni Gonzaga; Joey Marquez

Television/radio coverage
- Network: RPN
- Produced by: Full Media AV Productions

The 20th PMPC Star Awards for Television ceremony was held at the UP Theater, Quezon City on October 23, 2006 and broadcast over RPN Channel 9 on October 28, 2006. The ceremony was hosted by Boy Abunda, Tin Tin Bersola-Babao, Jean Garcia, Toni Gonzaga and Joey Marquez and directed by Ding Bolanos.

== Nominees and winners ==
These are the nominations for the 20th Star Awards for Television. The winners are in bold.

Network	Total # of Nominees
ABS-CBN	102
NBN	5
ABC	19
GMA	105
RPN	5
QTV	16
IBC	12
Studio 23	13

Network	Total # of Winners (including Special Awards)
ABS-CBN	26
ABC	2
GMA	24
QTV	3

=== Best TV station ===
- ABS-CBN-2
- NBN-4
- ABC-5
- **GMA-7**
- RPN-9
- QTV-11
- IBC-13
- Studio 23

=== Best Primetime Drama Series ===
- Encantadia (GMA 7)
- Gulong ng Palad (ABS-CBN 2)
- Ikaw ang Lahat sa Akin (ABS-CBN 2)
- Majika (GMA 7)
- **Sa Piling Mo (ABS-CBN 2)**
- Vietnam Rose (ABS-CBN 2)

=== Best Daytime Drama Series ===
- Agawin Mo Man Ang Lahat (GMA 7)
- Daisy Siete (GMA 7)
- Kung Mamahalin Mo Lang Ako (GMA 7)
- **Now and Forever (GMA 7)**

=== Best Drama Actor ===
- John Lloyd Cruz (Ikaw ang Lahat sa Akin / ABS-CBN 2)
- Christopher de Leon (Now and Forever: Agos / GMA 7)
- John Estrada (Vietnam Rose / ABS-CBN 2)
- Albert Martinez (Sa Piling Mo / ABS-CBN 2)
- **Diether Ocampo (Ikaw ang Lahat sa Akin / ABS-CBN 2)**
- Piolo Pascual (Sa Piling Mo / ABS-CBN 2)
- Dennis Trillo (Now and Forever: Agos / GMA 7)

=== Best Drama Actress ===
- Claudine Barretto (Ikaw ang Lahat sa Akin / ABS-CBN 2)
- Sunshine Dizon (Encantadia / GMA 7)
- Cherie Gil (Gulong ng Palad / ABS-CBN 2)
- Angel Locsin (Majika / GMA 7)
- Rica Peralejo (Sa Piling Mo / ABS-CBN 2)
- Judy Ann Santos (Sa Piling Mo / ABS-CBN 2)
- **Maricel Soriano (Vietnam Rose / ABS-CBN 2)**

=== Best Drama Anthology ===
- **Maalaala Mo Kaya (ABS-CBN 2)**
- Magpakailanman (GMA 7)
- Maynila (GMA 7)

=== Best Single Performance by an Actress ===
- Glaiza de Castro (Maalaala Mo Kaya: Rosaryo / ABS-CBN 2)
- Alessandra de Rossi (Magpakailanman: Pag-Ahon sa Lusak / GMA 7)
- Gloria Diaz (Maalaala Mo Kaya: Radyo / ABS-CBN 2)
- Jean Garcia (Magpakailanman: Kalbaryo ng Isang Ina / GMA 7)
- Maja Salvador (Maalaala Mo Kaya: Regalo / ABS-CBN 2)
- Judy Ann Santos (Maalaala Mo Kaya: Rosaryo / ABS-CBN 2)
- **Vilma Santos (Maalaala Mo Kaya: Regalo / ABS-CBN 2)**

=== Best Single Performance by an Actor ===
- **Carlo Aquino (Maalaala Mo Kaya: Scapular / ABS-CBN 2)**
- John Lloyd Cruz (Maalaala Mo Kaya: Greeting Card / ABS-CBN 2)
- Christopher de Leon (Maalaala Mo Kaya: Palamig / ABS-CBN 2)
- Jhong Hilario (Maalaala Mo Kaya: Bangka / ABS-CBN 2)
- Jeremy Marquez (Magpakailanman: Pag-Ahon sa Lusak / GMA 7)

=== Best New Male TV Personality ===
- Chuck Allie (Love to Love / GMA 7)
- Marky Cielo (Encantadia: Pag-ibig Hanggang Wakas / GMA 7)
- Franzen Fajardo (Your Song: Narda / ABS-CBN 2)
- Aldred Gatchalian (ASAP '06 / ABS-CBN 2)
- Angelo Ilagan (Mga Anghel na Walang Langit / ABS-CBN 2)
- **Sam Milby (ASAP '06 / ABS-CBN 2)**
- Makisig Morales (Little Big Star / ABS-CBN 2)
- Gerald Santos (SOP Rules / GMA 7)

=== Best New Female TV Personality ===
- Iwa Moto (Love to Love / GMA 7)
- Arci Muñoz (Agawin Mo Man Ang Lahat / GMA 7)
- Raquel Reyes (Mga Anghel na Walang Langit / ABS-CBN 2)
- Jackie Rice (Love to Love / GMA 7)
- **Marian Rivera (Agawin Mo Man Ang Lahat / GMA 7)**
- Nene Tamayo (TV Patrol World / ABS-CBN 2)
- Princess Violago (S-Files / GMA 7)

=== Best Gag Show ===
- Bitoy's Funniest Videos (GMA 7)
- **Bubble Gang (GMA 7)**
- Goin' Bulilit (ABS-CBN 2)
- Nuts Entertainment (GMA 7)
- Wazzup Wazzup (Studio 23)

=== Best Comedy Show ===
- Ay, Robot! (QTV 11)
- **Bahay Mo Ba 'To? (GMA 7)**
- Daddy Di Do Du (GMA 7)
- Hokus Pokus (GMA 7)
- Lagot Ka, Isusumbong Kita (GMA 7)
- OK Fine, 'To Ang Gusto Nyo! (ABS-CBN 2)

=== Best Comedy Actor ===
- **Ogie Alcasid (Bubble Gang / GMA 7)**
- Joey de Leon (Nuts Entertainment / GMA 7)
- Keempee de Leon (Bahay Mo Ba 'To? / GMA 7)
- Dolphy (Quizon Avenue / ABS-CBN 2)
- Edu Manzano (OK Fine, 'To Ang Gusto Nyo! / ABS-CBN 2)
- Roderick Paulate (Bora / ABS-CBN 2)
- Vic Sotto (Daddy Di Do Du / GMA 7)
- Michael V. (Bitoy's Funniest Videos / GMA 7)
- Ronaldo Valdez (Bahay Mo Ba 'To? / GMA 7)

=== Best Comedy Actress ===
- K Brosas (Hokus Pokus / GMA 7)
- Ai-Ai de las Alas (My Juan and Only / ABS-CBN 2)
- Toni Gonzaga (Wazzup Wazzup / Studio 23)
- Ara Mina (Bubble Gang / GMA 7)
- Pokwang (Quizon Avenue / ABS-CBN 2)
- Tiya Pusit (Bahay Mo Ba 'To? / GMA 7)
- **Rufa Mae Quinto (Hokus Pokus / GMA 7)**
- Gloria Romero (OK Fine, 'To Ang Gusto Nyo! / ABS-CBN 2)

=== Best Musical Variety Show ===
- **ASAP '06 (ABS-CBN 2)**
- ASAP Fanatic (ABS-CBN 2)
- SOP Gigsters (GMA 7)
- SOP Rules (GMA 7)
- Walang Tulugan with the Master Showman (GMA 7)

=== Best Variety Show ===
- Chowtime Na! (IBC 13)
- **Eat Bulaga! (GMA 7)**
- Gets Mo? Gets Ko! (IBC 13)
- SMS: Sunday Mall Show (IBC 13)
- Wowowee (ABS-CBN 2)

=== Best Female TV Host ===
- **Toni Gonzaga (ASAP '06 / ABS-CBN 2)**
- Pia Guanio (Eat Bulaga! / GMA 7)
- Jaya (SOP Rules / GMA 7)
- Zsa Zsa Padilla (ASAP '06 / ABS-CBN 2)
- Regine Velasquez (SOP Rules / GMA 7)

=== Best Male TV Host ===
- Ogie Alcasid (SOP Rules / GMA 7)
- Joey de Leon (Eat Bulaga! / GMA 7)
- Raymond Gutierrez (SOP Gigsters / GMA 7)
- **Luis Manzano (ASAP '06 / ABS-CBN 2)**
- German Moreno (Walang Tulugan with the Master Showman / GMA 7)
- Willie Revillame (Wowowee / ABS-CBN 2)
- Vic Sotto (Eat Bulaga! / GMA 7)
- Gary Valenciano (ASAP '06 / ABS-CBN 2)

=== Best Public Service Program ===
- Bitag (IBC 13)
- Emergency (GMA 7)
- Imbestigador (GMA 7)
- S.O.C.O.: Scene of the Crime Operatives (ABS-CBN 2)
- S.O.S.: Stories of Survival (ABC 5)
- **Wish Ko Lang (GMA 7)**
- XXX: Exklusibong, Explosibong, Exposé (ABS-CBN 2)

=== Best Public Service Program Host ===
- Gus Abelgas (S.O.C.O.: Scene of the Crime Operatives / ABS-CBN 2)
- Martin Andanar (S.O.S.: Stories of Survival / ABC 5)
- Julius Babao, Karen Davila, and Henry Omaga-Diaz (XXX: Exklusibong, Explosibong, Exposé / ABS-CBN 2)
- Arnold Clavio (Emergency / GMA 7)
- **Mike Enriquez (Imbestigador / GMA 7)**
- Vicky Morales (Wish Ko Lang / GMA 7)
- Ben Tulfo (Bitag / IBC 13)

=== Best Horror-Fantasy Program ===
- **Ang Mahiwagang Baul (GMA 7)**
- **Komiks (ABS-CBN 2)**
- Nginiig (ABS-CBN 2)
- Wag Kukurap (GMA 7)

=== Best Reality Competition Program ===
- Chow Time: Conquest (IBC 13)
- **Extra Challenge (GMA 7)**
- May Trabaho Ka! (QTV 11)
- Totoo TV (ABC 5)

=== Best Reality Competition Program Host ===
- Paolo Abrera and Mariz Umali (May Trabaho Ka! / QTV 11)
- **Paolo Bediones and Ethel Booba (Extra Challenge / GMA 7)**
- Maverick Relova and Ariel Villasanta (Totoo TV / ABC 5)
- Vanessa Untalan (Chow Time: Conquest / IBC 13)

=== Best Game Show ===
- All Star K!: The P1 Million Videoke Challenge (GMA 7)
- Blind Item (ABC 5)
- Now Na! (QTV 11)
- **Pilipinas, Game KNB? (ABS-CBN 2)**

=== Best Game Show Host ===
- Kris Aquino (Pilipinas, Game KNB? / ABS-CBN 2)
- **Arnel Ignacio (Now Na! / QTV 11)**
- Jaya and Allan K. (All-Star K: The P1 Million Videoke Challenge / GMA 7)
- John Lapus (Blind Item / ABC 5)

=== Best Talent Search Program ===
- Little Big Star (ABS-CBN 2)
- Pinoy Pop Superstar (GMA 7)
- **StarStruck: The Nationwide Invasion (GMA 7)**
- Shall We Dance? (ABC 5)

=== Best Talent Search Program Host ===
- Dingdong Dantes, Raymond Gutierrez and Jolina Magdangal (StarStruck: The Nationwide Invasion / GMA 7)
- Sarah Geronimo (Little Big Superstar / ABS-CBN 2)
- Dominic Ochoa and Lucy Torres-Gomez (Shall We Dance? / ABC 5)
- **Regine Velasquez (Pinoy Pop Superstar / GMA 7)**

=== Best Youth Oriented Program ===
- Let's Go! (ABS-CBN 2)
- **Love to Love (GMA 7)**
- Posh (QTV 11)
- Your Song (ABS-CBN 2)

=== Best Educational Program ===
- Island Flavors (ABC 5)
- Ka-Toque: Lutong Barkada (Q 11)
- **Kumikitang Kabuhayan (ABS-CBN 2)**
- Makuha Ka sa Tikim (ABS-CBN 2)
- Mobile Kusina (GMA 7)

=== Best Educational Program Host ===
- Gigi Angkaw (Island Flavors / ABC 5)
- Rosebud Benitez, JL Cang, Niño Logarta, Darlo Lopez, Mitchie Sison and Jonah Trinidad (Ka-Toque: Lutong Barkada / QTV 11)
- Eugene Domingo, Jean Garcia and Eula Valdez (Makuha Ka sa Tikim / ABS-CBN 2)
- **Christine Jacob (Mobile Kusina / GMA 7)**
- Donita Rose (Mobile Kusina / GMA 7)

=== Best Celebrity Talk Show ===
- **Homeboy (ABS-CBN 2)**
- Mel & Joey (GMA 7)
- Moms (QTV 11)
- Sharon (ABS-CBN 2)
- SiS (GMA 7)

=== Best Celebrity Talk Show Host ===
- **Boy Abunda (Homeboy / ABS-CBN 2)**
- Sharon Cuneta (Sharon / ABS-CBN 2)
- Gelli de Belen, Janice de Belen, and Carmina Villarroel (Sis / GMA 7)
- Joey de Leon and Mel Tiangco (Mel and Joey / GMA 7)
- Lani Mercado, Manilyn Reynes and Sherilyn Reyes (Moms / Q 11)

=== Best Documentary Program ===
- **The Correspondents (ABS-CBN 2)**
- Dokyu: Ang Bagong Mata ng Documentaries (ABC 5)
- i-Witness (GMA 7)
- Probe (ABS-CBN 2)

=== Best Documentary Program Host ===
- Sandra Aguinaldo, Kara David, Howie Severino and Jay Taruc (i-Witness / GMA 7)
- **Karen Davila and Abner Mercado (The Correspondents / ABS-CBN 2)**
- Cheche Lazaro (Probe / ABS-CBN 2)

=== Best Magazine Show ===
- Kapuso Mo, Jessica Soho (GMA 7)
- Kontrobersyal (ABS-CBN 2)
- Pipol (ABS-CBN 2)
- **Rated K (ABS-CBN 2)**
- Real Stories: Kasama si Loren (ABC 5)
- Reporter's Notebook (GMA 7)

=== Best Magazine Show Host ===
- Boy Abunda (Kontrobersyal / ABS-CBN 2)
- Ces Drilon (Pipol / ABS-CBN 2)
- Loren Legarda (Real Stories: Kasama si Loren / ABC 5)
- Jiggy Manicad and Maki Pulido (Reporter's Notebook / GMA 7)
- **Korina Sanchez (Rated K / ABS-CBN 2)**
- Jessica Soho (Kapuso Mo, Jessica Soho / GMA 7)

=== Best News Program ===
- **24 Oras (GMA 7)**
- ABS-CBN Insider (ABS-CBN 2)
- Big News (ABC 5)
- IBC Express Balita (IBC 13)
- NewsWatch Now (RPN 9)
- Saksi (GMA 7)
- Teledyaryo Sabado (NBN 4)
- **TV Patrol World (ABS-CBN 2)**

=== Best Male Newscaster ===
- Ali Atienza (IBC Express Balita / IBC 13)
- **Julius Babao (TV Patrol World / ABS-CBN 2)**
- Arnold Clavio (Saksi / GMA 7)
- Eric Eloriaga (Newswatch Now /RPN 9)
- Mike Enriquez (24 Oras / GMA 7)
- Ted Failon (TV Patrol World / ABS-CBN 2)
- Ivan Mayrina (News on Q / Q 11)
- Buddy Oberas (Teledyaryo Sabado/ NBN 4)
- Dong Puno (ABS-CBN Insider / ABS-CBN 2)

=== Best Female Newscaster ===
- Pia Arcangel (Balitanghali / QTV 11)
- Karen Davila (TV Patrol World / ABS-CBN 2)
- Precious Hipolito (IBC Express Balita / IBC 13)
- Cherie Mercado (Big News / ABC 5)
- **Vicky Morales (Saksi / GMA 7)**
- Korina Sanchez (Bandila / ABS-CBN 2)
- Rhea Santos (News on Q / QTV 11)
- Bernadette Sembrano (ABS-CBN Insider / ABS-CBN 2)
- Mel Tiangco (24 Oras / GMA 7)

=== Best Morning Show ===
- Breakfast (Studio 23)
- **Magandang Umaga, Pilipinas (ABS-CBN 2)**
- The Morning Show (NBN 4)
- Unang Hirit (GMA 7)

=== Best Morning Show Host ===
- Bam Aquino, Mariton Pacheco and Company (Breakfast / Studio 23)
- **Kim Atienza, Julius Babao, Tin Tin Bersola-Babao, Bernadette Sembrano and Company (Magandang Umaga, Pilipinas / ABS-CBN 2)**
- Snow Badua, Veronica Baluyot-Jimenez, Stefanie Cueva, Bobby Guanzon and William Thio (The Morning Show / NBN 4)
- Lyn Ching, Arnold Clavio, Susie Entrata-Abrera, Jolina Magdangal, Regine Tolentino and Company (Unang Hirit / GMA 7)

=== Best Public Affairs Program ===
- **Debate with Mare at Pare (GMA 7)**
- Dong Puno Live (ABS-CBN 2)
- Up Close and Personal (IBC 13)
- Y Speak (Studio 23)

=== Best Public Affairs Program Host ===
- Ryan Agoncillo and Bianca Gonzalez (Y Speak / Studio 23)
- Marissa del Mar (Up Close and Personal / IBC 13)
- **Winnie Monsod and Oscar Orbos (Debate with Mare at Pare / GMA 7)**
- Dong Puno (Dong Puno Live/ABS-CBN 2)

=== Best Showbiz Oriented Talk Show ===
- **The Buzz (ABS-CBN 2)**
- Entertainment Konek (ABS-CBN 2)
- S-Files (GMA 7)
- Showbiz Stripped (GMA 7)
- **Startalk (GMA 7)**

=== Best Male Showbiz Oriented Talk Show Host ===
- **Boy Abunda (The Buzz / ABS-CBN 2)**
- Paolo Bediones (S-Files / GMA 7)
- Joey de Leon (Startalk / GMA 7)
- Richard Gomez (S-Files / GMA 7)
- Ricky Lo (Showbiz Stripped / GMA 7)

=== Best Female Showbiz Oriented Talk Show Host ===
- **Kris Aquino (The Buzz / ABS-CBN 2)**
- Cristy Fermin (The Buzz / ABS-CBN 2)
- Toni Gonzaga (Entertainment Konek / ABS-CBN 2)
- Pia Guanio (S-Files / GMA 7)

=== Best Children Show ===
- Art Angel (GMA 7)
- Art Jam (ABS-CBN 2)
- **Kids TV (ABC 5)**

=== Best Children Show Host ===
- Pia Arcangel (Art Angel / GMA 7)
- **Maxine, Joyrose Romina and Yuuki (Kids TV / ABC 5)**
- Jeffrey Quizon (Art Jam / ABS-CBN 2)

=== Best Travel Show ===
- **Pinoy Abroad (GMA 7)**
- Team Explorer (Studio 23)
- Trip na Trip (ABS-CBN 2)
- Travel Time (Studio 23)
- WOW: What’s On Weekend (RPN 9)

=== Best Travel Show Host ===
- Susan Calo-Medina and Lui Villaruz (Travel Time / Studio 23)
- Katherine de Castro and Franzen Fajardo (Trip na Trip / ABS-CBN 2)
- Joel Mendez (WOW: What’s On Weekend / RPN 9)
- **Ivan Mayrina and Rhea Santos (Pinoy Abroad / GMA 7)**
- Lui Villaruz (Team Explorer / Studio 23)

=== Best Lifestyle Show ===
- At Home Ka Dito (ABS-CBN 2)
- **Gandang Ricky Reyes (QTV 11)**
- The Good Life with Cory Quirino (Studio 23)
- Kay Susan Tayo (GMA 7)
- Tahanang Pinoy (ABC 5)

=== Best Lifestyle Show Host ===
- Aissa Gonzales, RJ Ledesma and Gelo Manosa (Tahanang Pinoy / ABC 5)
- Susan Enriquez (Kay Susan Tayo / GMA 7)
- Charlene Gonzales (At Home Ka Dito / ABS-CBN 2)
- Cory Quirino The Good Life with Cory Quirino / Studio 23)
- **Ricky Reyes (Gandang Ricky Reyes / QTV 11)**

== Special awards ==
=== Ading Fernando Lifetime Achievement Awardee ===
- Eddie Mercado

=== Excellence in Broadcasting Awardee ===
- Harry Gasser (Male)
- Cristina Pecson (Female)

=== Faces of the Night ===
- John Estrada (Male)
- Bettina Carlos (Female)

=== Stars of the Night ===
- Bob dela Cruz (Male)
- Ethel Booba (Female)

== See also ==
- PMPC Star Awards for TV
