= 23rd PMPC Star Awards for Television =

- Date: November 29, 2009
- Location: PAGCOR Grand Theater, Paranaque City
- Hosted by: Piolo Pascual; Carmina Villarroel; John Lloyd Cruz

Television/radio coverage
- Network: ABS-CBN

The 23rd PMPC Star Awards for TV ceremony was held at the PAGCOR Grand Theater in Paranaque City on November 29, 2009 and broadcast over ABS-CBN Channel 2. The ceremony was hosted by Piolo Pascual, Carmina Villarroel and John Lloyd Cruz and directed by Erick C. Salud.

== Awards and nominees ==
These are the nominations for the 23rd Star Awards for Television. The winners are in bold.

Network	Total # of Nominees
ABS-CBN	121
NBN	3
TV5	22
GMA	79
RPN	1
Q	27
IBC	5
Studio 23	6
Net 25	7
UNTV	7

Network	Total # of Winners (including Special Awards)
ABS-CBN	27
TV5	3
GMA	15
Q	4
Net 25	1
UNTV	1

=== Best TV station ===
- **ABS-CBN-2**
- NBN-4
- TV5
- GMA-7
- RPN-9
- Q-11
- IBC-13
- Studio 23
- Net 25
- UNTV-37

=== Best Primetime TV Series ===
- Codename: Asero (GMA 7)
- Eva Fonda (ABS-CBN 2)
- Iisa Pa Lamang (ABS-CBN 2)
- Kahit Isang Saglit (ABS-CBN 2)
- Luna Mystika (GMA 7)
- **May Bukas Pa (ABS-CBN 2)**
- Tayong Dalawa (ABS-CBN 2)

=== Best Daytime Drama Series ===
- Ligaw na Bulaklak (ABS-CBN 2)
- **Pieta (ABS-CBN 2)**
- Precious Hearts Romances Presents: Bud Brothers (ABS-CBN 2)
- Sine Novela Presents: Saan Darating Ang Umaga? (GMA 7)

=== Best Drama Mini-Series ===
- SRO Cinemaserye Presents: Ganti (GMA 7)
- SRO Cinemaserye Presents: Suspetsa (GMA 7)
- Your Song Presents: Boystown (ABS-CBN 2)
- **Your Song Presents: My Only Hope (ABS-CBN 2)**
- Your Song Presents: Someone Like You (ABS-CBN 2)

=== Best Drama Actor ===
- Gerald Anderson (Your Song Presents: My Only Hope / ABS-CBN 2)
- Christopher de Leon (Kahit Isang Saglit / ABS-CBN 2)
- Baron Geisler (SRO Cinemaserye Presents: Suspetsa / GMA 7)
- **Coco Martin (Tayong Dalawa / ABS-CBN 2)**
- Albert Martinez (May Bukas Pa / ABS-CBN 2)
- Diether Ocampo (Iisa Pa Lamang / ABS-CBN 2)
- Jericho Rosales (Kahit Isang Saglit / ABS-CBN 2)

=== Best Drama Actress ===
- Claudine Barretto (Iisa Pa Lamang / ABS-CBN 2)
- Agot Isidro (Tayong Dalawa / ABS-CBN 2)
- Angel Locsin (Only You / ABS-CBN 2)
- Angelica Panganiban (Iisa Pa Lamang / ABS-CBN 2)
- **Gina Pareño (Tayong Dalawa / ABS-CBN 2)**
- Cherry Pie Picache (Iisa Pa Lamang / ABS-CBN 2)
- Cristine Reyes (Eva Fonda / ABS-CBN 2)

=== Best Drama Anthology ===
- **Maalaala Mo Kaya (ABS-CBN 2)**
- Maynila (GMA 7)
- Obra (GMA 7)

=== Best Single Performance by an Actress ===
- Gina Alajar (Obra Presents: JC de Vera / GMA 7)
- **Gretchen Barretto (Maalaala Mo Kaya: Salamin / ABS-CBN 2)**
- Alessandra de Rossi (Maalaala Mo Kaya: Pedicab / ABS-CBN 2)
- **Sunshine Dizon (Obra Presents: Sunshine Dizon / GMA 7)**
- Judy Ann Santos (Maalaala Mo Kaya: Lason / ABS-CBN 2)
- Lorna Tolentino (Maalaala Mo Kaya: Chess / ABS-CBN 2)
- Carmina Villarroel (Maalaala Mo Kaya: Reseta / ABS-CBN 2)

=== Best Single Performance by an Actor ===
- John Lloyd Cruz (Maalaala Mo Kaya: Pedicab / ABS-CBN 2)
- JC de Vera (Obra Presents: Pretty Boy / GMA 7)
- Vice Ganda (Maalaala Mo Kaya: Bola / ABS-CBN 2)
- **Joross Gamboa (Maalaala Mo Kaya: Bisikleta / ABS-CBN 2)**
- Richard Gomez (Obra Presents: Bayaran / GMA 7)
- Albert Martinez (Maalaala Mo Kaya: Bisikleta / ABS-CBN 2)
- Diether Ocampo (Maalaala Mo Kaya: Lambat / ABS-CBN 2)
- John Wayne Sace (Maalaala Mo Kaya: Chess / ABS-CBN 2)

=== Best New Male TV Personality ===
- JR de Guzman (Midnight DJ / TV5)
- Miguel de Las Cagigas (Lipgloss / TV5)
- Zyrus Desamparado (Lipgloss / TV5)
- **Zaijian Jaranilla (May Bukas Pa / ABS-CBN 2)**
- Xian Lim (Your Song Presents: My Only Hope / ABS-CBN 2)
- Guji Lorenzana (Precious Hearts Romance Presents: Bud Brothers / ABS-CBN 2)
- JC Tiuseco (Unang Hirit / GMA 7)

=== Best New Female TV Personality ===
- Patani Daño (Ful Haus / GMA 7)
- Maritoni Francisco (Kiddie Kwela / TV5)
- Schinina Juban (Fashionistas By Heart / Q 11)
- Cheska Ortega (Lipgloss / TV5)
- Queenie Padilla (Totoy Bato / GMA 7)
- **Maricar Reyes (Precious Hearts Romance Presents Presents: Bud Brothers / ABS-CBN 2)**
- Carmen Soo (Kahit Isang Saglit / ABS-CBN 2)

=== Best Gag Show ===
- **Banana Split (ABS-CBN 2)**
- **Bubble Gang (GMA 7)**
- Goin' Bulilit (ABS-CBN 2)
- Lokomoko High (TV5)
- Nuts Entertainment (GMA 7)
- Wow Mali (TV5)

=== Best Comedy Show ===
- Everybody Hapi (TV5)
- **Ful Haus (GMA 7)**
- Parekoy (ABS-CBN 2)

=== Best Comedy Actor ===
- Ogie Alcasid (Bubble Gang / GMA 7)
- Joey de Leon (Nuts Entertainment / GMA 7)
- Jayson Gainza (Banana Split, ABS-CBN 2)
- **Pooh (Banana Split / ABS-CBN 2)**
- Vic Sotto (Ful Haus / GMA 7)
- Michael V. (Bubble Gang / GMA 7)

=== Best Comedy Actress ===
- Eugene Domingo (Everybody Hapi / TV5)
- Alex Gonzaga (Everybody Hapi / TV5)
- Angelica Panganiban (Banana Split / ABS-CBN 2)
- Pokwang (Banana Split / ABS-CBN 2)
- **Rufa Mae Quinto (Bubble Gang / GMA 7)**
- Sharlene San Pedro (Goin’ Bulilit / ABS-CBN 2)

=== Best Musical Variety Show ===
- **ASAP '08 (ABS-CBN 2)**
- SOP Rules (GMA 7)
- Walang Tulugan with the Master Showman (GMA 7)

=== Best Female TV Host ===
- Julia Clarete (Eat Bulaga / GMA 7)
- **Valerie Concepcion (Wowowee / ABS-CBN 2)**
- Toni Gonzaga (ASAP '08 / ABS-CBN 2)
- Pia Guanio (Eat Bulaga / GMA 7)
- Regine Velasquez (SOP Rules / GMA 7)

=== Best Male TV Host ===
- Ogie Alcasid (SOP Rules / GMA 7)
- Allan K. (Eat Bulaga / GMA 7)
- **Luis Manzano (ASAP '08 / ABS-CBN 2)**
- German Moreno (Walang Tulugan with the Master Showman / GMA 7)
- Vic Sotto (Eat Bulaga / GMA 7)

=== Best Public Service Program ===
- Bitag Live (UNTV 37)
- **Imbestigador (GMA 7)**
- Reunions (Q 11)
- Wish Ko Lang! (GMA 7)
- Wonder Mom (ABS-CBN 2)
- XXX: Exklusibong, Explosibong, Exposé (ABS-CBN 2)

=== Best Public Service Program Host ===
- Julius Babao, Henry Omaga-Diaz, and Pinky Webb (XXX: Exklusibong, Explosibong, Exposé / ABS-CBN 2)
- Karen Davila (Wonder Mom / ABS-CBN 2)
- Mike Enriquez (Imbestigador / GMA 7)
- Vicky Morales (Wish Ko Lang! / GMA 7)
- Jessica Soho (Reunions / Q 11)
- **Ben Tulfo (Bitag Live / UNTV 37)**

=== Best Horror-Fantasy Program ===
- Komiks Presents: Dragonna (ABS-CBN 2)
- Komiks Presents: Flash Bomba (ABS-CBN 2)
- Komiks Presents: Nasaan Ka Maruja? (ABS-CBN 2)
- Komiks Presents: Tiny Tony (ABS-CBN 2)
- Komiks Presents: Varga (ABS-CBN 2)
- **Midnight DJ (TV5)**

=== Best Reality Program ===
- Dare Duo (Q 11)
- **Day Off (Q 11)**
- OMG! (TV5)
- Pinoy Records (GMA 7)

=== Best Reality Program Host ===
- Ryan Agoncillo (Pinoy Fear Factor / ABS-CBN 2)
- **Paolo Bediones (Survivor Philippines / GMA 7)**
- Billy Crawford, Nikki Gil and Toni Gonzaga (Pinoy Dream Academy Season 2 / ABS-CBN 2)
- Marc Nelson and Rovilson Fernandez (Dare Duo / Q 11)
- Manny Pacquiao and Chris Tiu (Pinoy Records / GMA 7)

=== Best Variety/Game Show ===
- All Star K!: The P1M Videoke Challenge (GMA 7)
- Pilipinas, Game KNB? (ABS-CBN 2)
- **Wowowee (ABS-CBN 2)**
- You and Me Against the World (TV5)

=== Best Game Show Host ===
- Kris Aquino (Kapamilya: Deal or No Deal / ABS-CBN 2)
- Janno Gibbs (Kakasa Ka Ba Sa Grade 5? / GMA 7)
- **Richard Gomez (Family Feud / GMA 7)**
- Allan K. and Jaya (All Star K! The P1M Videoke Challenge / GMA 7)
- Edu Manzano (Pilipinas, Game KNB? / ABS-CBN 2)

=== Best Talent Search Program ===
- Shall We Dance: The Celebrity Dance Challenge (TV5)
- **Talentadong Pinoy (TV5)**

=== Best Talent Search Program Host ===
- **Ryan Agoncillo (Talentadong Pinoy / TV5)**
- Ogie Alcasid and Regine Velasquez (Celebrity Duets Season 2 / GMA 7)
- Jon Avila, Victor Basa, Arnel Ignacio and Lucy Torres-Gomez (Shall We Dance: The Celebrity Dance Challenge / TV5)

=== Best Youth Oriented Program ===
- **Ka-Blog! (GMA 7)**
- Lipgloss (TV5)

=== Best Educational Program ===
- Born to Be Wild (GMA 7)
- Convergence (Net 25)
- Swak na Swak (ABS-CBN 2)
- **Matanglawin (ABS-CBN 2)**
- Quickfire (Q 11)

=== Best Educational Program Host ===
- Kim Atienza (Matanglawin / ABS-CBN 2)
- Rosebud Benitez (Quickfire / Q 11)
- Paolo Contis (World Records / GMA 7)
- Amy Perez and Gilbert Remulla (Kabuhayang Swak Na Swak / ABS-CBN 2)
- Ferds Recio and Kiko Rustia (Born to Be Wild / GMA 7)
- **Bong Revilla (Kap's Amazing Stories / GMA 7)**

=== Best Celebrity Talk Show ===
- Boy & Kris (ABS-CBN 2)
- Ruffa & Ai (ABS-CBN 2)
- Sharon (ABS-CBN 2)
- **SiS (GMA 7)**
- Spoon (Net 25)
- The Sweet Life (Q 11)

=== Best Celebrity Talk Show Host ===
- Boy Abunda and Kris Aquino (Boy & Kris / ABS-CBN 2)
- Sharon Cuneta (Sharon / ABS-CBN 2)
- **Janice de Belen (Spoon / Net 25)**
- Janice de Belen, Gelli de Belen and Carmina Villarroel (Sis / GMA 7)
- Ai-Ai de las Alas and Ruffa Gutierrez (Ruffa & Ai / ABS-CBN 2)
- Wilma Doesnt and Lucy Torres-Gomez (The Sweet Life / Q 11)

=== Best Documentary Program ===
- The Correspondents (ABS-CBN 2)
- I Survived (ABS-CBN 2)
- **I-Witness (GMA 7)**
- Kalye: Mga Kuwento ng Lansangan (ABS-CBN 2)
- Reporter's Notebook (GMA 7)

=== Best Documentary Program Host ===
- **Sandra Aguinaldo, Kara David, Howie Severino and Jay Taruc (I-Witness / GMA 7)**
- Sol Aragones, Atom Araullo and Anthony Taberna (Kalye: Mga Kuwento Ng Lansangan / ABS-CBN 2)
- Karen Davila, Abner Mercado and Bernadette Sembrano (The Correspondents / ABS-CBN 2)
- Jiggy Manicad and Maki Pulido (Reporter's Notebook / GMA 7)
- Ces Oreña-Drilon (I Survived / ABS-CBN 2)

=== Best Documentary Special ===
- Kidnap (ABS-CBN 2)
- Mega Tatlong Dekada (ABS-CBN 2)
- Newsmakers (GMA 7)
- Summer Sarap (GMA 7)
- **Walang Iwanan (ABS-CBN 2)**
- Walang Pera? (GMA 7)

=== Best Magazine Show ===
- **Kapuso Mo, Jessica Soho (GMA 7)**
- Mel & Joey (GMA 7)
- Moments (Net 25)
- Rated K (ABS-CBN 2)
- The Beat (Q 11)

=== Best Magazine Show Host ===
- Joey de Leon and Mel Tiangco (Mel and Joey / GMA 7)
- Tonipet Gaba, Ivan Mayrina, Miriam Quiambao and Valerie Tan (The Beat / Q 11)
- Gladys Reyes (Moments / Net 25)
- Korina Sanchez (Rated K / ABS-CBN 2)
- **Jessica Soho (Kapuso Mo, Jessica Soho / GMA 7)**

=== Best News Program ===
- 24 Oras (GMA 7)
- Balitanghali (Q 11)
- IBC Express Balita (IBC 13)
- Bandila (ABS-CBN 2)
- Saksi (GMA 7)
- News on Q (Q 11)
- TEN: The Evening News (TV5)
- **TV Patrol World (ABS-CBN 2)**

=== Best Male Newscaster ===
- Martin Andanar (TEN: The Evening News / TV5)
- Jove Francisco (TEN: The Evening News / TV5)
- Bing Formento (IBC Express Balita / IBC 13)
- **Julius Babao (TV Patrol World / ABS-CBN 2)**
- Ted Failon (TV Patrol World / ABS-CBN 2)
- Ivan Mayrina (News on Q / Q 11)
- Arnold Clavio (Saksi: Liga ng Katotohanan / GMA 7)
- Henry Omaga-Diaz (Bandila / ABS-CBN 2)

=== Best Female Newscaster ===
- Cherie Mercado (TEN: The Evening News / TV5)
- Karen Davila (TV Patrol World / ABS-CBN 2)
- Precious Hipolito (IBC Express Balita / IBC 13)
- **Vicky Morales (Saksi: Liga ng Katotohanan / GMA 7)**
- Ces Drilon (Bandila / ABS-CBN 2)
- Korina Sanchez (Bandila / ABS-CBN 2)
- Rhea Santos (News on Q / Q 11)
- Mel Tiangco (24 Oras / GMA 7)

=== Best Morning Show ===
- Good Morning Kuya (UNTV 37)
- Home Page (Net 25)
- One Morning (NBN 4)
- **Umagang Kay Ganda (ABS-CBN 2)**
- Unang Hirit (GMA 7)

=== Best Morning Show Host ===
- Drew Arellano, Lyn Ching-Pascual, Arnold Clavio, Susie Entrata-Abrera, Jolina Magdangal, Winnie Monsod, Eagle Riggs, Rhea Santos and Regine Tolentino (Unang Hirit / GMA 7)
- Tony Arevalo, Allan Encarnacion, Aida Gonzales, Rene Jose, Ryan Ramos and Daniel Razon (Good Morning Kuya / UNTV 37)
- **Kim Atienza, Winnie Cordero, Ginger Conejero, Edu Manzano, Rica Peralejo, Donita Rose, Alex Santos, Bernadette Sembrano, Anthony Taberna and Pinky Webb (Umagang Kay Ganda / ABS-CBN 2)**
- Aljo Bendijo, Veronica Baluyut-Jimenez, Charlene Lontoc, JM Rodriguez, Claudine Trillo and Bobby Yan (One Morning / NBN 4)
- Weng dela Fuente, Eunice Mariño and Ros Olgado (Home Page / Net 25)

=== Best Public Affairs Program ===
- Harapan (ABS-CBN 2)
- **Probe Profiles (ABS-CBN 2)**
- Y Speak (Studio 23)

=== Best Public Affairs Program Host ===
- Ted Failon and Korina Sanchez (Harapan / ABS-CBN 2)
- Bianca Gonzales (Y Speak / Studio 23)
- **Cheche Lazaro (Probe Profiles / ABS-CBN 2)**

=== Best Showbiz Oriented Talk Show ===
- The Buzz (ABS-CBN 2)
- Entertainment Live (ABS-CBN 2)
- Juicy! (TV5)
- Showbiz Central (GMA 7)
- **SNN: Showbiz News Ngayon (ABS-CBN 2)**
- Startalk (GMA 7)

=== Best Male Showbiz Oriented Talk Show Host ===
- **Boy Abunda (SNN: Showbiz News Ngayon / ABS-CBN 2)**
- Joey de Leon (Startalk / GMA 7)
- Raymond Gutierrez (Showbiz Central / GMA 7)
- Luis Manzano (Entertainment Live / ABS-CBN 2)
- Mo Twister (Showbiz Central / GMA 7)

=== Best Female Showbiz Oriented Talk Show Host ===
- Kris Aquino (The Buzz / ABS-CBN 2)
- **Toni Gonzaga (Entertainment Live / ABS-CBN 2)**
- Bianca Gonzales (Entertainment Live / ABS-CBN 2)
- Pia Guanio (Showbiz Central / GMA 7)
- Mariel Rodriguez (Entertainment Live / ABS-CBN 2)

=== Best Children Show ===
- **Art Angel (GMA 7)**
- Batang Bibbo (GMA 7)
- Kiddie Kwela (TV 5)
- Kids on Q (Q 11)
- Sine'skwela (ABS-CBN 2)

=== Best Children Show Host ===
- Bayani Agbayani (Kiddie Kwela / TV5)
- Renford Alano, Aria Cariño, Romina de Jesus, Tonipet Gaba, Ella Guevara, David Hubalde and Sam Turingan (Kids On Q / Q 11)
- **Pia Arcangel, Tonipet Gaba, and Krystal Reyes (Art Angel / GMA 7)**
- Roxanne Barcelo (Batang Bibbo / GMA 7)
- Tado Jimenez, Bombi Plata, and Shiela May Junsay (Sineskwela / Studio 23)

=== Best Travel Show ===
- **Balik-Bayan (Q 11)**
- Bread N' Butter (UNTV 37)
- Biyaheng Langit (IBC 13)
- Landmarks (Net 25)
- Trip na Trip (ABS-CBN 2)

=== Best Travel Show Host ===
- **Drew Arellano (Balik-Bayan / Q 11)**
- Faye de Castro (Landmarks / Net 25)
- Katherine de Castro, Jayson Gainza, Franzen Fajardo, Kian Kazemi and Uma Khouny (Trip na Trip / ABS-CBN 2)
- Rodel Flordeliz, Kitt Meily and Arlene Razon (Bread N' Butter / UNTV 37)
- Rey Langit (Biyaheng Langit / IBC 13)

=== Best Lifestyle Show ===
- **Events Incorporated (Q 11)**
- Fashionistas By Heart (Q 11)
- House Life (Q 11)
- Life and Style (Q 11)
- Urban Zone (ABS-CBN)
- Us Girls (Studio 23)

=== Best Lifestyle Show Host ===
- Angel Aquino, Iya Villania and Cheska Garcia (Us Girls / Studio 23)
- Jocas de Leon, Heart Evangelista and Schinina Juban (Fashionistas By Heart / Q 11)
- **Sam Oh and Tim Yap (Events Incorporated / Q 11)**
- Daphne Oseña-Paez (Urban Zone / ABS-CBN)
- Tessa Prieto-Valdes (House Life / Q 11)
- Ricky Reyes (Life and Style / Q 11)

== Special awards ==
=== Ading Fernando Lifetime Achievement Awardee ===
- Johnny Manahan

=== Excellence in Broadcasting Awardee ===
- Noli de Castro

=== Hall of Fame ===
- Eat Bulaga (GMA 7) (Best Variety Show)

=== Faces of the Night ===
- John Lloyd Cruz (Male)
- Sunshine Dizon (Female)

=== Stars of the Night ===
- Piolo Pascual (Male)
- Anne Curtis (Female)

== See also ==
- PMPC Star Awards for TV
