= 100% Pinoy! =

Philippine television news magazine show

- Title card
- Genre: News magazine
- Presented by: Kara David; Raffy Tima; Pia Arcangel; Rhea Santos; Ivan Mayrina; Miriam Quiambao; Joaquin Valdes; Chino Trinidad; Connie Sison
- Country of origin: Philippines
- Original language: Tagalog

Production
- Camera setup: Multiple-camera setup
- Running time: 60 minutes
- Production company: GMA News and Public Affairs

Original release
- Network: GMA Network
- Release: July 5, 2006 – September 25, 2008

100% Pinoy! (transl. 100% Filipino) is a Philippine television news magazine show broadcast by GMA Network. Originally hosted by Kara David, Raffy Tima, Pia Arcangel, Rhea Santos and Ivan Mayrina, it premiered on July 5, 2006. The show concluded on September 25, 2008. Miriam Quiambao and Joaquin Valdes served as the final hosts.

== Premise ==
The show features either popular or secluded locations in the Philippines, including local traditions and other localities.

=== Last episode ===
On September 5, 2008, the show aired its last episode. The episode starts with the hosts touring the audience and visiting popular places in the Philippines. The hosts later visit the Cordillera Mountain Range and beaches in the Philippines, the episode soon ends highlighting the two-year run of 100% Pinoy!

== Hosts ==
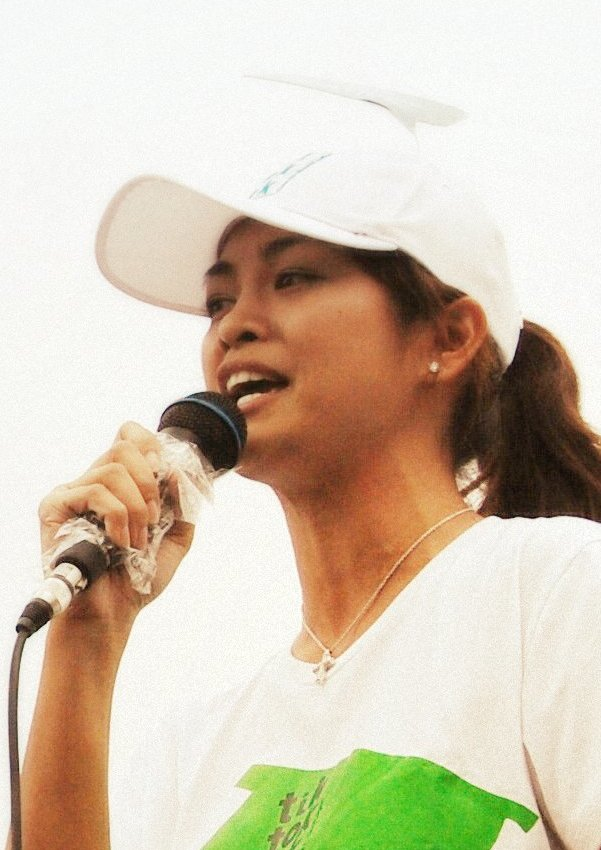
Miriam Quaimbao served as a host.

- Kara David (2006–07)
- Raffy Tima (2006–07)
- Pia Arcangel (2006–07)
- Rhea Santos (2006–07)
- Ivan Mayrina (2006–07)
- Miriam Quiambao (2007–08)
- Joaquin Valdes (2007–08)
- Chino Trinidad (2007–08)
- Connie Sison (2007–08)

== Accolades ==
Accolades received by 100% Pinoy
Year	Award	Category	Recipient	Result	Ref.
2007	21st PMPC Star Awards for Television	Best Magazine Show	100% Pinoy	Nominated	
2007	21st PMPC Star Awards for Television	Best Magazine Show Host	Pia Arcangel Ivan Mayrina Maki Pulido Rhea Santos Raffy Tima	Nominated	
2008	22nd PMPC Star Awards for Television	Best Magazine Show	100% Pinoy	Nominated	
2008	22nd PMPC Star Awards for Television	Best Magazine Show Host	Miriam Quiambao Joaquin Valdez	Nominated	
