= 16th PMPC Star Awards for Television =

- Date: October 12, 2002
- Location: U.P. Theater
- Presented by: Philippine Movie Press Club
- Hosted by: Pops Fernandez; Ai-Ai delas Alas; Boy Abunda; Charlene Gonzales; Gretchen Barretto; Regine Velasquez; Piolo Pascual; Bong Revilla; Phillip Salvador; Dingdong Dantes; Sharon Cuneta (Trivia host)

Television/radio coverage
- Network: RPN 9
- Directed by: Al Quinn

The following is a list of winners for the PMPC Star Awards for TV for 2002.

== Hosts ==
- Pops Fernandez
- Ai-Ai delas Alas
- Boy Abunda
- Charlene Gonzales
- Gretchen Barretto
- Regine Velasquez
- Piolo Pascual
- Bong Revilla
- Phillip Salvador
- Dingdong Dantes
- Sharon Cuneta (Trivia host)

== Performers ==
For the first time ever, hosts performed musical numbers. Gonzales performed a Latin dance number, Abunda and delas Alas sang a duet together, Velasquez sang a compilation of Barbra Streisand hits, Barretto sang "La Vie en Rose", and Fernandez sang a Shakira number.

== Winners ==
BEST EDUCATIONAL PROGRAM: Knowledge Power (ABS-CBN 2)

BEST EDUCATIONAL PROGRAM HOST: Ernie Baron - Knowledge Power (ABS-CBN 2)

BEST FANTASY/HORROR PROGRAM: Wansapanataym (ABS-CBN 2)

BEST CHILDREN’S PROGRAM: 5 & Up (GMA 7)

BEST CHILDREN’S PROGRAM HOSTS: 5 & Up Kids (GMA 7)

BEST YOUTH-ORIENTED PROGRAM: Click (GMA 7)

BEST MORNING SHOW: Unang Hirit (GMA 7)

BEST MORNING SHOW HOSTS: Arnold Clavio, Lyn Ching, Miriam Quiambao, Suzie Entrata, Rhea Santos, Martin Andanar, Ivan Mayrina, Hans Montenegro and Co. - Unang Hirit (GMA 7)

BEST GAME SHOW: Game K N B? (ABS-CBN 2)

BEST GAME SHOW HOST: Kris Aquino - Game K N B? (ABS-CBN 2)

BEST NEW MALE TV PERSONALITY: Paolo Ballesteros - Daddy Di Do Du (GMA 7)

BEST NEW FEMALE TV PERSONALITY: Nancy Castiliogne - Sana Ay Ikaw Na Nga (GMA 7)

BEST LIFESTYLE PROGRAM: F (ABS-CBN 2)

BEST LIFESTYLE PROGRAM HOSTS: Angel Aquino, Cher Calvin & Daphne Oseña - F (ABS-CBN 2)

BEST CELEBRITY TALK SHOW: Private Conversations (ABS-CBN 2)

BEST CELEBRITY TALK SHOW HOST: Boy Abunda - Private Conversations (ABS-CBN 2)

BEST SHOWBIZ-ORIENTED SHOW: Startalk (GMA 7)

BEST MALE SHOWBIZ-ORIENTED SHOW HOST: Boy Abunda - The Buzz (ABS-CBN 2)

BEST FEMALE SHOWBIZ-ORIENTED SHOW HOST: Kris Aquino - The Buzz (ABS-CBN 2)

BEST GAG SHOW: Bubble Gang (GMA 7)

BEST COMEDY SHOW: Kool Ka Lang (GMA 7)

BEST COMEDY ACTORS: Michael V. (GMA 7)/Ogie Alcasid (GMA 7)

BEST COMEDY ACTRESS: Ai-Ai Delas Alas - Whattamen (ABS-CBN 2)

BEST PUBLIC SERVICE PROGRAM: Mission X (ABS-CBN 2)

BEST PUBLIC SERVICE PROGRAM HOST: Erwin Tulfo - Mission X (ABS-CBN 2)

BEST PUBLIC AFFAIRS PROGRAM: Debate (GMA 7)

BEST PUBLIC AFFAIRS PROGRAM HOSTS: Winnie Monsod & Oscar Orbos - Debate (GMA 7)

BEST MAGAZINE PROGRAM: Jessica Soho Reports (GMA 7)

BEST MAGAZINE PROGRAM HOST: Jessica Soho - Jessica Soho Reports (GMA 7)

BEST TRAVEL SHOW: Cheche Lazaro Presents (GMA 7)

BEST TRAVEL SHOW HOST: Cheche Lazaro - Cheche Lazaro Presents (GMA 7)

BEST NEWS PROGRAM: Frontpage (GMA 7)

BEST MALE NEWSCASTER: Henry Omaga-Diaz - TV Patrol (ABS-CBN 2)

BEST FEMALE NEWSCASTER: Mel Tiangco - Frontpage (GMA 7)/Korina Sanchez - TV Patrol (ABS-CBN 2)

BEST DRAMA SERIES: Kung Mawawala Ka (GMA 7)

BEST DRAMA MINI-SERIES: Pira-pirasong Pangarap (GMA 7)

BEST DRAMA ANTHOLOGY: Maalaala Mo Kaya (ABS-CBN 2)

BEST DRAMA ACTOR: Eddie Garcia - Kung Mawawala Ka (GMA 7)

BEST DRAMA ACTRESS: Jean Garcia - Pangako Sa'Yo (ABS-CBN 2)

BEST DRAMA ACTOR IN A SINGLE PERFORMANCE: Paolo Contis - MMK: Chicken Feet (ABS-CBN 2)

BEST DRAMA ACTRESS IN A SINGLE PERFORMANCE: Regine Velasquez - MMK: Lobo (ABS-CBN 2)

BEST VARIETY SHOW: Eat Bulaga! (GMA 7)

BEST MUSICAL VARIETY SHOW: SOP (GMA 7)

BEST MALE VARIETY SHOW HOST: Vic Sotto - Eat Bulaga! (GMA 7)

BEST FEMALE VARIETY SHOW HOST: Pops Fernandez - ASAP (ABS-CBN 2)

BEST TV STATION: GMA 7

== 16 Longest-Running TV Shows ==
Since this was the 16th edition of the Star Awards for Television, the PMPC honored 16 of the longest-running TV shows in the country. The following shows were honored by the PMPC:

1. Ating Alamin
2. Chikiting Patrol
3. Damayan
4. Eat Bulaga
5. Home Along Da Riles
6. Kapwa Ko Mahal Ko
7. Maalaala Mo Kaya
8. Magandang Gabi... Bayan
9. NewsWatch
10. Partners Mel & Jay
11. Ricky Reyes Beauty School
12. Plus
13. The Big News
14. The Probe Team
15. Travel Time
16. TV Patrol
