= Rhea Santos =

Filipino journalist (born 1979)

- Born: June 1, 1979 (age 47); San Mateo, Rizal, Philippines
- Education: St. Paul University Quezon City, (AB)
- Occupations: Broadcast journalist; television presenter
- Years active: 2000–present
- Employers: GMA Network (2000–19); Omni Television (2020–26); Citytv / CityNews (2026–present)
- Television: Unang Hirit; Tunay na Buhay; Reporter's Notebook
- Height: 1.76 m (5 ft 9 in)
- Spouse: Carlo de Guzman (m. 2004)
- Children: 2

Rhea Santos-de Guzman (born June 1, 1979) is a Filipino-Canadian broadcast journalist and television presenter currently based in Canada. She is known for co-anchoring GMA Network's morning show Unang Hirit and hosting several news and public affairs programs including Reporter's Notebook and Tunay na Buhay. After 19 years of being a broadcast journalist, she left the Philippines to study and eventually resume her profession in Vancouver, Canada.

== Early life ==
Santos was born on June 1, 1979 in San Mateo, Rizal and stayed most of her childhood in Marikina. She has an older brother and a younger brother. She finished elementary and high school at St. Scholastica's Academy of Marikina. She graduated magna cum laude at St. Paul's College Quezon City (now known as St. Paul University Quezon City) finishing AB Mass Communications. One of her project in her first year in college was interviewing Arnold Clavio (her future co-anchor in Unang Hirit) about martial law. She had an internship at ABS-CBN in her junior year in college.

During her senior year in high school, it became clear to her that she would like to be a broadcast journalist. Although, her childhood dream was to become a beauty queen and her mother fully supported her. With that, she participated in the 1996 Body Shots competition where she became one of the finalists and won the "Best in Swimsuit" special award. Standing at 5 ft 9 in (1.75 m), she was once a commercial and ramp model and an endorser for some products. She also auditioned for Binibining Piipinas but after an argument with her mother in front of the judges, she did not pursue it.

== Career ==
Upon graduating from college, Santos worked for an airline company and a PR firm. Eventually, she decided to follow her aspiration to become a broadcast journalist and began to send job applications to television networks. In July 2000, GMA Network replied on her application and started to work there as a segment producer. One day, she had the opportunity to be one of the newscasters and hosts of GMA Network's morning show Unang Hirit, temporarily replacing Miriam Quiambao who was absent for a day. She eventually became a regular of the show in 2001.

In 2003, she was assigned to anchor Frontpage's segment GMA Action Force where she was also a field reporter interviewing different people such as criminal gangs in Tondo, Manila. In 2004, she had her own show At Your Service-Star Power. In the same year, she co-hosted Eat Bulaga! Silver Special, which was a co-production of TAPE Inc. and GMA News and Public Affairs, with her fellow anchor in Unang Hirit, Arnold Clavio. The following year, GMA launched Pinoy Abroad, which she co-hosted with Ivan Mayrina.

She had anchored primetime newscast News on Q (previously aired by QTV, renamed as Q, later GMA News TV and eventually since 2021 became GTV) from 2005 to 2010. She also hosted public affairs program Women's Desk (later re-titled as Draw the Line) in 2005 and documentary show DoQmentaries in 2008 along with other presenters Connie Sison and Pia Arcangel. She co-hosted Reporter's Notebook with Jiggy Manicad in 2009 where she reported from the field and covered high-profile cases such as the Maguindanao massacre.

Santos left Reporter's Notebook in 2011 to host Tunay na Buhay, a television program that features biographies of celebrities, which was first aired on January 21, 2011. In 2013, she guested at The Ryzza Mae Show. In 2016, she hosted the television special entitled Imagine You & Me: The Journey, which is a documentary for the film Imagine You & Me, starring the AlDub love team of Alden Richards and Maine Mendoza. In 2018, she anchored the Lenten special of Unang Hirit where they broadcast live from Israel.

In 2019, she retired as a broadcast journalist after leaving the Philippines together with her family to pursue her further education in Canada taking up Broadcast and Online Journalism at the British Columbia Institute of Technology. With her 19 years experience in the television news industry in the Philippines, she has covered and broadcast major events during the 2000s and 2010s such as the Philippine national elections of those times, State of the Nation Addresses of Philippine presidents Gloria Macapagal-Arroyo, Benigno Aquino III and Rodrigo Duterte, the 9/11 attack in New York City, United States, the wedding of Prince William and Catherine Middleton, and Philippine Chief Justice Renato Corona's impeachment trial. She has been the longest-serving female morning newscaster in the history of Philippine television. On September 1, 2020, she resumed her career in the news industry, premiering as the anchor of the national Philippine edition of Omni News in Vancouver, British Columbia, Canada until July 3, 2026, when she moved to CityNews Vancouver.

== Personal life ==
On September 17, 2004, Santos married businessman and Hotshots Burger chain owner, Carlo de Guzman. They have two children nicknamed Uno and Yuan. Aside from being a media personality, she had a baking business through Curious Chef Philippines. In 2010, she was named by Spot.ph, an entertainment website, as the third hottest television newswomen in the Philippines.

The last appearance of Santos in Tunay na Buhay features her life story.

== Filmography ==
=== Television ===
- Unang Hirit – (2000–2019)
- Frontpage – (2003–2004)
- i-Witness: Abakada ni Ina – (2004)
- Eat Bulaga!: Silver Anniversary Special – (2004)
- At Your Service-Star Power – (2004–2005)
- Pinoy Abroad – (2005–2006)
- News on Q – (2005–2010)
- Draw the Line – (formerly known as Women's Desk, 2005–2009)
- 100% Pinoy! – (2006–2007)
- Quickfire – (2008) – guest
- Case Unclosed – (2009)
- Reporter's Notebook – (2009–2011)
- Tunay na Buhay – (2011–2019)
- Follow That Star – (2013) – featured celebrity
- The Ryzza Mae Show – (2013) – guest
- The 700 Club Asia – (2016) – guest
- Imagine You & Me: The Journey – (2016)
- OMNI News: Filipino Edition – (2020–2026)
- OMNI Prairies: Pinoy Konek – (2020) – guest
- CityNews – (2026–present)

== Accolades ==
Year	Nominee / work	Award	Result
2001	Unang Hirit	15th PMPC Star Awards for Television – Best Morning Show Host	Won
2002	Unang Hirit	16th PMPC Star Awards for Television – Best Morning Show Host	Won
2002	Rhea Santos	16th PMPC Star Awards for Television – Most Promising Female TV Personality	Nominated
2004	i-Witness: ABAKADA ni Ina	2004 Catholic Mass Media Awards – Best TV Magazine Show	Won
2005	At Your Service: Under the Sea Special	2005 U.S. International Film and Video Festival – Gold Camera Award	Won
2006	Pinoy Abroad	20th PMPC Star Awards for Television – Best Travel Show Host	Won
2008	Unang Hirit	22nd PMPC Star Awards for Television – Best Morning Show Host	Won
2013	Unang Hirit	27th PMPC Star Awards for Television – Best Morning Show Host	Won
2015	Unang Hirit	29th PMPC Star Awards for Television – Best Morning Show Host	Won
2016	Tunay na Buhay	30th PMPC Star Awards for Television – Best Documentary Program Host	Nominated
2017	Unang Hirit	Gawad Tanglaw Awards 2017 – Best Morning Show Host	Won
