= Tunay na Buhay =

Philippine television documentary show

- Title card from 2020 to 2022
- Genre: Documentary
- Written by: Augie Rivera
- Directed by: Armin Collado
- Presented by: Rhea Santos; Pia Arcangel
- Country of origin: Philippines
- Original language: Tagalog

Production
- Executive producer: Arvin Garcia
- Camera setup: Multiple-camera setup
- Running time: 30–45 minutes
- Production company: GMA News and Public Affairs

Original release
- Network: GMA Network (January 21, 2011 – July 15, 2020, January 6, 2021 – October 20, 2021); GMA News TV (August 5, 2020 – December 30, 2020); GTV (October 27, 2021 – January 12, 2022)
- Release: January 21, 2011 – January 12, 2022

Tunay na Buhay (transl. real life) is a Philippine television documentary show broadcast by GMA Network, GMA News TV and GTV. Originally hosted by Rhea Santos, it premiered on January 21, 2011 on the network's evening line up. The show concluded on GMA Network on July 15, 2020. The show moved to GMA News TV on August 5, 2020 on the network's Power Block line up. Pia Arcangel served as the host. The show returned to GMA Network on January 6, 2021. The show concluded on January 12, 2022.

== Hosts ==
- Rhea Santos (2011–19)
- Pia Arcangel (2019–22)

Guest host

- Susan Enriquez

== Production ==
In March 2020, production was halted due to the enhanced community quarantine in Luzon caused by the COVID-19 pandemic. The show resumed its programming on August 5, 2020.

== Ratings ==
According to AGB Nielsen Philippines' Mega Manila People/Individual television ratings, the pilot episode of Tunay na Buhay earned a 2.5% rating.

== Accolades ==
Accolades received by Tunay na Buhay
Year	Award	Category	Recipient	Result	Ref.
2012	26th PMPC Star Awards for Television	Best Magazine Show	Tunay na Buhay	Nominated	
2012	26th PMPC Star Awards for Television	Best Magazine Show Host	Rhea Santos	Nominated	
2013	27th PMPC Star Awards for Television	Best Documentary Program Host	Rhea Santos	Nominated	
2014	28th PMPC Star Awards for Television	Best Documentary Program Host	Rhea Santos	Nominated	
2016	30th PMPC Star Awards for Television	Best Documentary Program Host	Rhea Santos	Nominated	
2018	32nd PMPC Star Awards for Television	Best Documentary Program	Tunay na Buhay	Nominated	
2018	32nd PMPC Star Awards for Television	Best Documentary Program Host	Rhea Santos	Nominated	
2019	33rd PMPC Star Awards for Television	Best Documentary Program Host	Rhea Santos	Nominated	
2023	35th PMPC Star Awards for Television	Best Documentary Program	Tunay na Buhay	Nominated	
2023	35th PMPC Star Awards for Television	Best Documentary Program Host	Pia Arcangel	Nominated	
