= News Live =

News Live may refer to:

- News Live (Indian TV channel), an Indian Assamese-language satellite news channel
- News Live (Philippine TV program), a Philippine TV program, formerly known as News TV Live
