= Pinoy Abroad =

Philippine television documentary show

- Title card
- Genre: Travel documentary
- Written by: May Delos Santos
- Directed by: May Delos Santos
- Presented by: Ivan Mayrina; Rhea Santos
- Opening theme: "Malayo Man, Malapit Din" by Bayang Barrios
- Country of origin: Philippines
- Original language: Tagalog

Production
- Executive producer: May Delos Santos
- Camera setup: Multiple-camera setup
- Running time: 60 minutes
- Production company: GMA News and Public Affairs

Original release
- Network: GMA Network
- Release: April 6, 2005 – June 28, 2006

Pinoy Abroad (transl. Filipino abroad) is a Philippine television travel documentary show broadcast by GMA Network. Hosted by Ivan Mayrina and Rhea Santos, it premiered on April 6, 2005. The show concluded on June 28, 2006.

The show is streaming online on YouTube.

== Hosts ==
- Ivan Mayrina
- Rhea Santos

== Accolades ==
Accolades received by Pinoy Abroad
| Year | Award | Category | Recipient | Result | Ref. |
|---|---|---|---|---|---|
| 2006 | 20th PMPC Star Awards for Television | Best Travel Show | Pinoy Abroad | Won | |
| 2006 | 20th PMPC Star Awards for Television | Best Travel Show Hosts | Ivan Mayrina Rhea Santos | Won | |
