= Draw the Line (Philippine TV program) =

Philippine television show

- Title card as Women's Desk
- Also known as: Women's Desk
- Genre: Public affairs; Docudrama
- Presented by: Rhea Santos
- Country of origin: Philippines
- Original language: Tagalog

Production
- Camera setup: Multiple-camera setup
- Running time: 60 minutes
- Production company: GMA News and Public Affairs

Original release
- Network: QTV/Q
- Release: November 17, 2005 – March 2009

Draw the Line, formerly Women's Desk is a Philippine television public affairs show broadcast by QTV. Hosted by Rhea Santos, it premiered on November 17, 2005 as Women's Desk. The show concluded in March 2009.
