= News on Q =

Philippine television news show

- Title card
- Genre: News broadcasting
- Directed by: Pye Cruz-Gravador
- Presented by: Ivan Mayrina; Rhea Santos; Connie Sison
- Country of origin: Philippines
- Original languages: Tagalog (November 11, 2005 – March 2, 2007; April 5, 2010 – February 18, 2011); English (March 5, 2007 – March 31, 2010)

Production
- Executive producer: Queenie Santos-Dimapawi
- Production locations: Studio 4, GMA Network Center, Quezon City, Philippines
- Camera setup: Multiple-camera setup
- Running time: 30–60 minutes
- Production company: GMA News and Public Affairs

Original release
- Network: QTV/Q
- Release: November 11, 2005 – February 18, 2011

News on Q is a Philippine television news broadcasting show broadcast by QTV. Originally anchored by Ivan Mayrina and Rhea Santos, it premiered on November 11, 2005. The show concluded on February 18, 2011. Mayrina and Connie Sison served as the final anchors.

In 2007, the language of the show–Tagalog was changed to English.

== Anchors ==
- Ivan Mayrina (2005–11)
- Rhea Santos (2005–10)
- Connie Sison (2010–11)
- Grace Lee (2010–11, Silip Showbiz)
- Winnie Monsod (analysis; 2008–11)

== Accolades ==
Accolades received by News on Q
Year	Award	Category	Recipient	Result	Ref.
2007	21st PMPC Star Awards for Television	Best News Program	News on Q	Nominated	
2007	21st PMPC Star Awards for Television	Best Male Newscaster	Ivan Mayrina	Nominated	
2007	21st PMPC Star Awards for Television	Best Female Newscaster	Rhea Santos	Nominated	
2009	23rd PMPC Star Awards for Television	Best Male Newscaster	Ivan Mayrina	Nominated	
2010	New York Festivals TV & Film Awards	Best News Analysis/Commentar	News on Q	Finalist	
2010	24th PMPC Star Awards for Television	Best News Program	News on Q	Nominated	
