= On Call: Serbisyong Totoo. Ngayon. =

Philippine television public service show

- Title card
- Also known as: On Call: Balita. Serbisyo. Ngayon.; On Call: Serbisyong Totoo. Ngayon.; On Call: Siksik Sa Impormasyon. Bilis na Pag-Aksyon.
- Genre: Public broadcasting
- Presented by: Ivan Mayrina; Connie Sison
- Country of origin: Philippines
- Original language: Tagalog

Production
- Production locations: GMA Network Studios, Quezon City, Philippines
- Camera setup: Multiple-camera setup
- Running time: 30–60 minutes
- Production company: GMA News and Public Affairs

Original release
- Network: GMA News TV
- Release: February 28, 2011 – May 30, 2012

On Call: Siksik sa Impormasyon. Bilis na Pag-Aksyon. (transl. on call: packed with information. fast in action) is a Philippine television public service show broadcast by GMA News TV. Anchored by Ivan Mayrina and Connie Sison, it premiered on February 28, 2011. The show concluded on May 30, 2012.

== Hosts ==
- Ivan Mayrina
- Connie Sison

== Accolades ==
Accolades received by On Call: Serbisyong Totoo. Ngayon.
Year	Award	Category	Recipient	Result	Ref.
2011	8th Golden Screen TV Awards	Outstanding Public Service Program	On Call	Nominated	
2011	8th Golden Screen TV Awards	Outstanding Public Service Program Host	Ivan Mayrina Connie Sison	Nominated	
