= The Beat (Philippine TV program) =

Philippine television infotainment show

- Title card
- Also known as: Sapulso
- Genre: Infotainment
- Directed by: Armin Collado
- Presented by: Ivan Mayrina; Tonipet Gaba; Monica Verallo
- Country of origin: Philippines
- Original languages: Tagalog (2006–08, 2010–11); English (2008–10)

Production
- Executive producer: Jacel Arqueros
- Editors: Ruel Militar; Dickvan Cordero; Jan Vincent Chiu; Josue Penilla
- Camera setup: Multiple-camera setup
- Running time: 30 minutes
- Production company: GMA News and Public Affairs

Original release
- Network: QTV/Q
- Release: July 24, 2006 – February 14, 2011

The Beat, formerly Sapulso is a Philippine television infotainment show broadcast by QTV. It premiered on July 24, 2006. The show concluded on February 14, 2011.

== Hosts ==
- Ivan Mayrina

Segment hosts

- Patani Daño
- Tonipet Gaba
- Monica Verallo
- Betong Sumaya
- Mariz Umali

Former hosts

- Valerie Tan
- Miriam Quiambao

== Accolades ==
Accolades received by The Beat
Year	Award	Category	Recipient	Result	Ref.
2009	23rd PMPC Star Awards for Television	Best Magazine Show	The Beat	Nominated	
2009	23rd PMPC Star Awards for Television	Best Magazine Show Host	Tonipet Gaba, Ivan Mayrina, Miriam Quiambao, Valerie Tan	Nominated	
