= Unang Hirit =

Philippine television news and talk show

- Title card since 2026
- Genre: News broadcasting; Talk show
- Directed by: Noel Cabacungan; Conrado Lumabas III
- Presented by: Arnold Clavio; Suzi Entrata; Lyn Ching-Pascual; Ivan Mayrina; Susan Enriquez; Mariz Umali
- Theme music composer: Jimmy Antiporda
- Opening theme: "Unang Hirit sa Umaga" (1999–2002); "Sa Unang Hirit, Nangunguna Ka" (since 2002)
- Country of origin: Philippines
- Original language: Tagalog

Production
- Executive producers: Amy Sy-Guevarra; Janela Paguio
- Production locations: Studio 3, GMA Network Center, Quezon City, Philippines
- Camera setup: Multiple-camera setup
- Running time: 120–180 minutes
- Production companies: GMA Public Affairs; GMA News

Original release
- Network: GMA Network
- Release: December 6, 1999 – present

Unang Hirit (transl. first strike) is a Philippine television news broadcasting and talk show broadcast by GMA Network. Originally hosted by Ryan Agoncillo, Lyn Ching-Pascual, Arnold Clavio, Suzi Entrata, Mickey Ferriols, and Miriam Quiambao, it premiered on December 6, 1999 on the network's morning line up. Clavio, Entrata, Ching-Pascual, Susan Enriquez, Ivan Mayrina and Mariz Umali currently serve as the hosts. It is the longest running morning show in the Philippines.

== Overview ==
Unang Hirit premiered on GMA Network on December 6, 1999, replacing Mornings @ GMA. Ryan Agoncillo, Lyn Ching, Arnold Clavio, Suzi Entrata, Mickey Ferriols and Miriam Quiambao served the show as the original hosts.

On July 15, 2002, the segment Unang Balita (transl. first news) debuted. On April 11, 2011, Edu Manzano returned to the show.

On July 31, 2019, Rhea Santos announced her departure from the show to migrate in Canada. Santos was replaced by Mariz Umali in August 2019. In March 2020, the production was halted due to the enhanced community quarantine in Luzon caused by the COVID-19 pandemic. The show resumed its programming on April 13, 2020.

On February 28, 2023, Connie Sison left the show to focus on her family and health.

== Hosts ==
Hosts

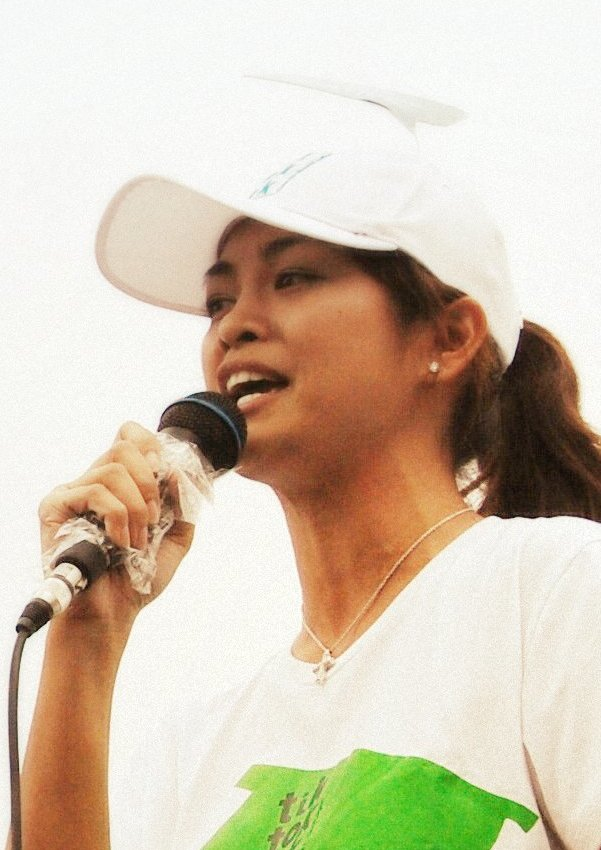
Miriam Quiambao

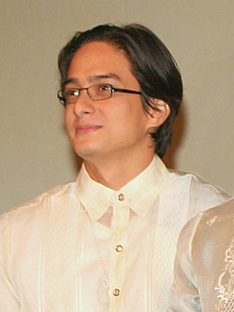
Ryan Agoncillo

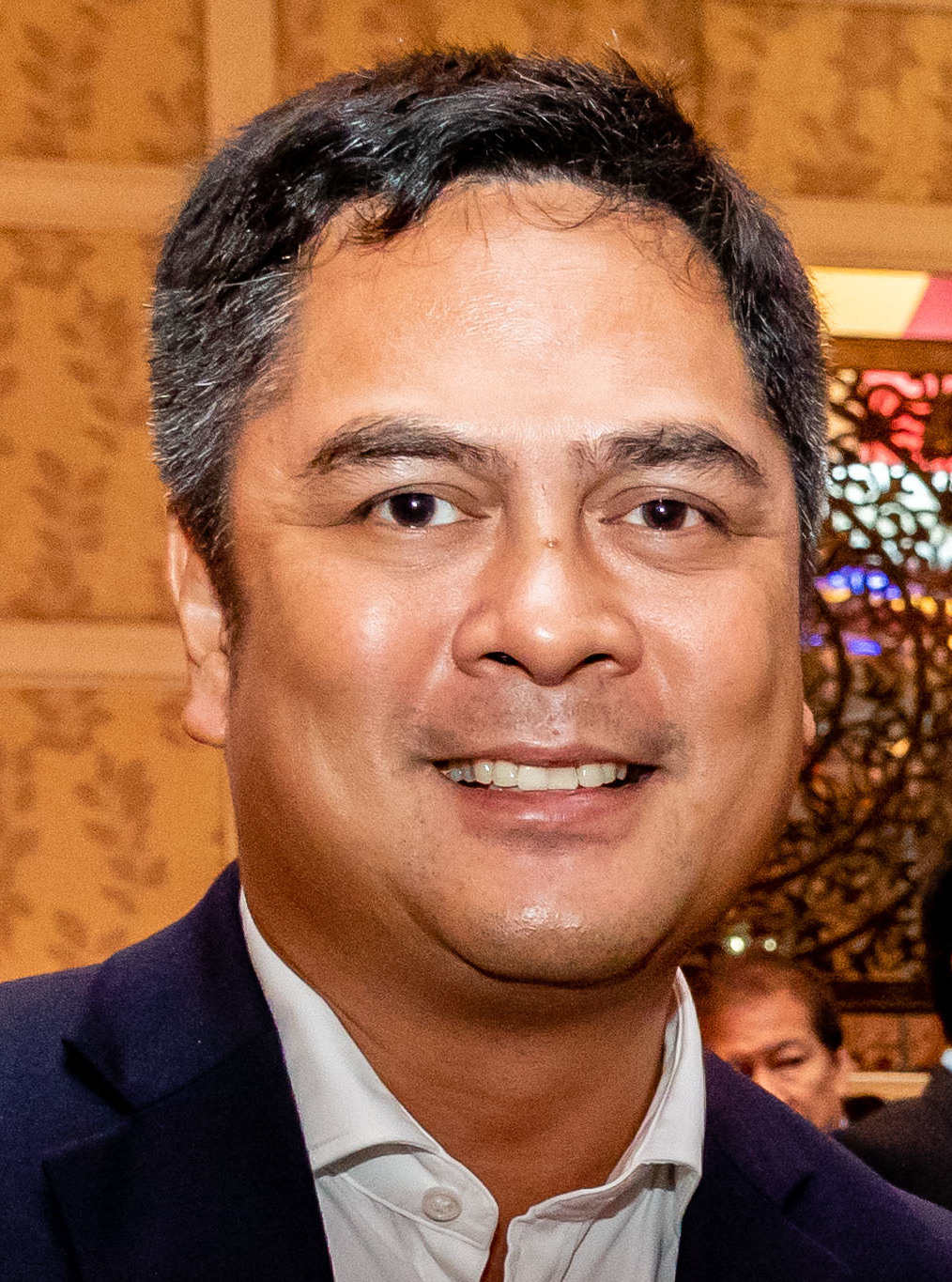
Martin Andanar

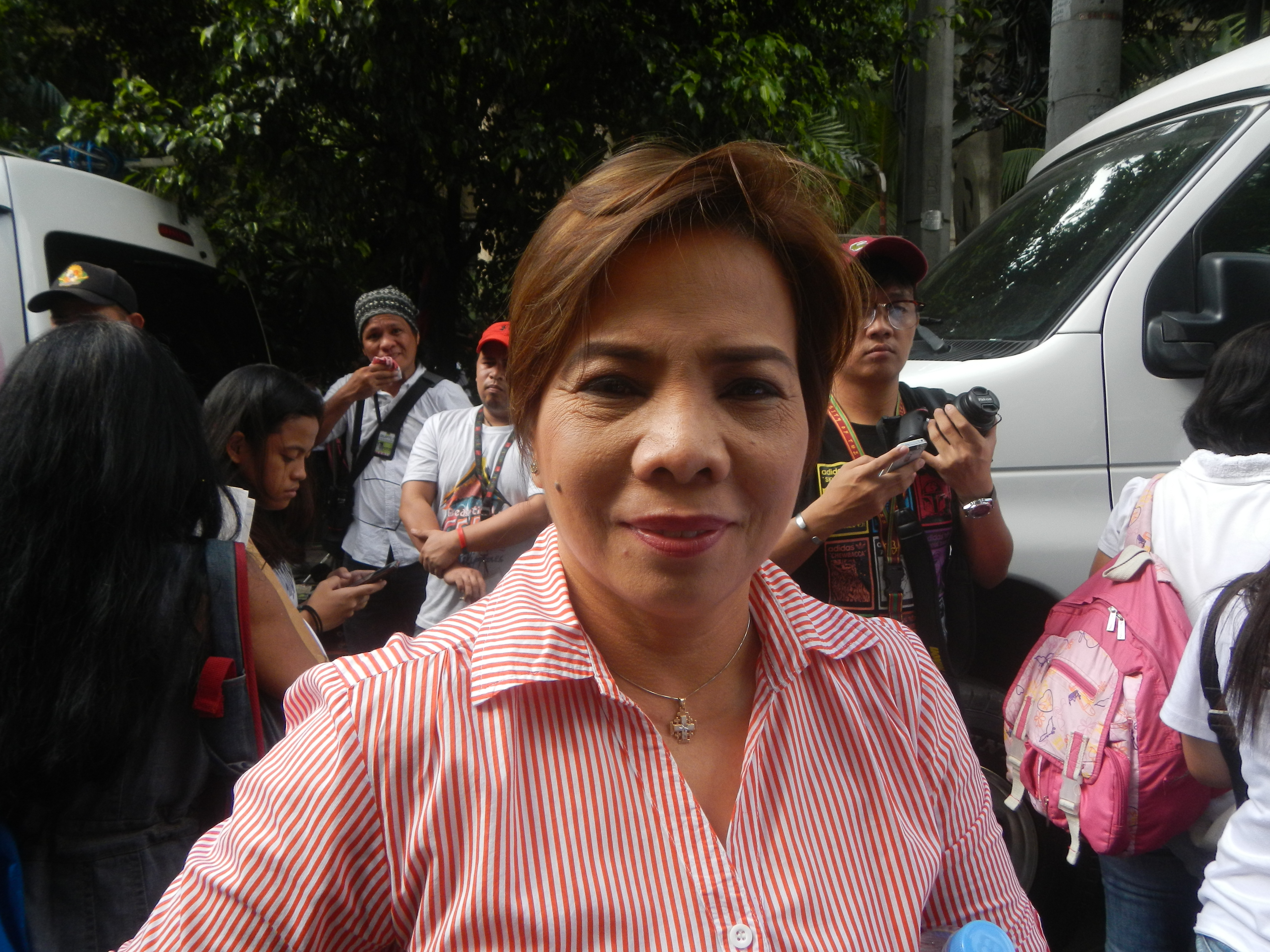
Susan Enriquez

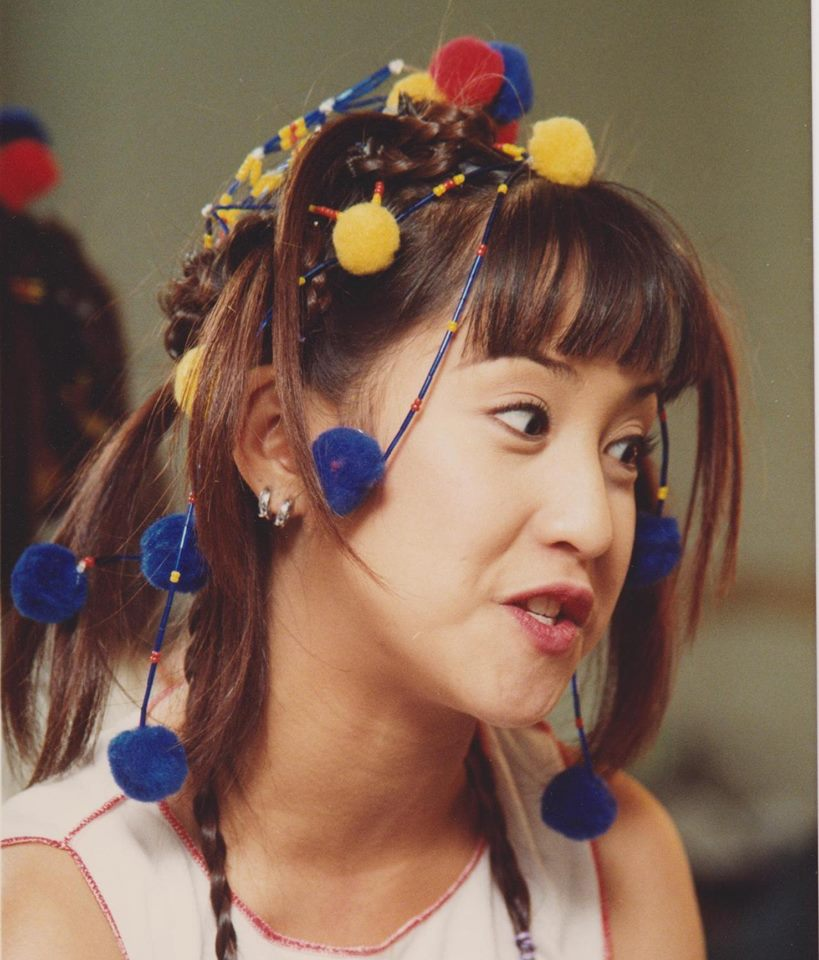
Jolina Magdangal

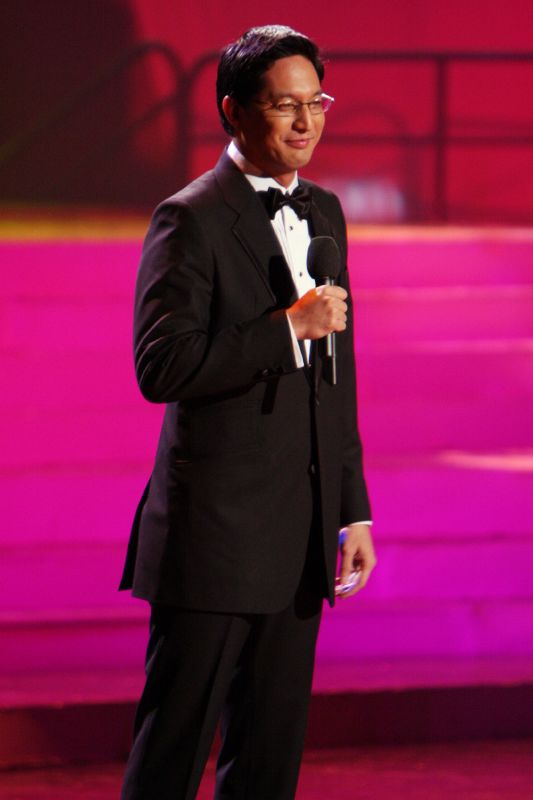
Paolo Bediones

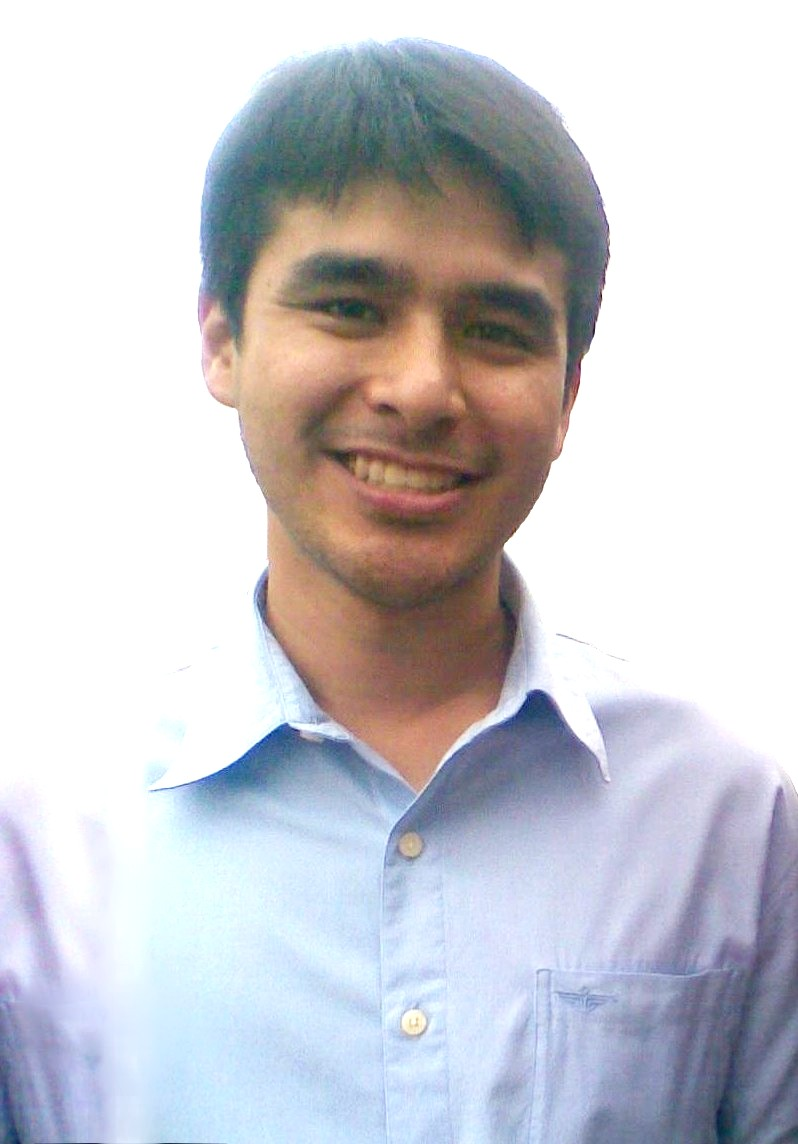
Atom Araullo

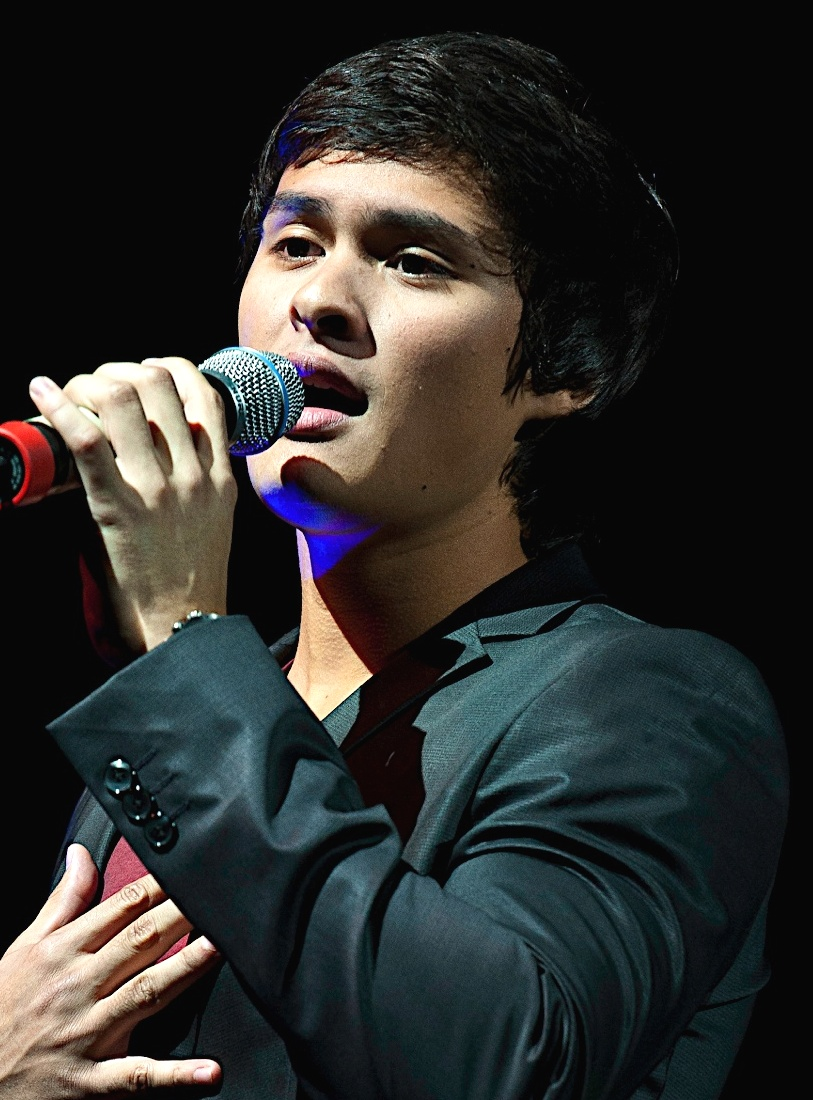
Matteo Guidicelli

- Arnold Clavio (since 1999)
- Suzi Entrata-Abrera (since 1999)
- Lyn Ching-Pascual (since 1999)
- Susan Enriquez (since 2009)
- Ivan Mayrina (since 2010)
- Mariz Umali (since 2019)

Segment hosts

- Gaby Concepcion (since 2003)
- Shaira Diaz (since 2021)
- Kaloy Tingcungco (since 2022)
- Jenzel Angeles (since 2022)
- Roxie Smith (since 2022)
- Anjay Anson (since 2022)
- Kim Perez (since 2022)
- JR Royol (since 2022)
- Anjo Pertierra (since 2023)
- Cheska Fausto (since 2023)
- Sean Lucas (since 2023)
- Shuvee Etrata (since 2023)
- Joy Barcoma (since 2026)
- Baus Rufo (since 2026)

Former hosts

- Ryan Agoncillo (1999–2001)
- Mickey Ferriols (1999–2000)
- Mon Isberto (1999–2000)
- Miriam Quiambao (1999–2003)
- Eagle Riggs (2000–10)
- Martin Andanar (2000–02)
- Hans Montenegro (2000–03)
- TJ Manotoc (2000–03)
- Arn-Arn (2000–17)
- Rhea Santos (2000–19)
- Lhar Santiago (2001–21)
- Love Añover (2002–22)
- Daniel Razon (2002–05)
- Pia Arcangel (2003–14)
- Atom Araullo (2003–04)
- Edu Manzano (2003; 2011)
- Tessa Nieto (2004)
- Drew Arellano (2004–14)
- Diana Zubiri (2005)
- Jolina Magdangal (2006–09)
- Oscar Oida (2007–09)
- Paolo Bediones (2007–09)
- Sunshine Dizon (2007–08)
- Nikki Dacullo (2008–09)
- Monica Verallo (2010–14)
- Connie Sison (2010–23)
- Luane Dy (2010–21)
- Tonipet Gaba (2012–16)
- Jun Veneracion (2012; 2015–16)
- Nathaniel Cruz (2013–22)
- Mikael Daez (2014–15)
- Hiro Peralta (2016–18)
- Matteo Guidicelli (2023–24)

Former segment hosts

- Jackie Lou Blanco (2001–06; Feel Good With J-lou)
- Cory Quirino (1999–2004)
- Luchi Cruz-Valdes (1999–2002)
- Oscar Orbos (1999–2006)
- Bea Binene (2014–17)
- Manny Calayan (2005–09)
- Pie Calayan (2005–09)
- Kat Manalo (2005–09)
- Fanny Serrano (2005–09)
- Olen Juarez-Lim (2005–09)
- Connie Sison
- Regine Tolentino (2004–18)
- Winnie Monsod (2004–21)
- Juancho Triviño (2016–21)
- John Philip Bughaw (2016–18)
- Boobay (2016–2022)
- Phytos Ramirez (2017–19)
- Yuan Francisco (2017–20)
- Klea Pineda (2018–19)
- Clint Bondad (2018)
- Joyce Pring (2018–19)
- Donita Nose (2019–20)
- Krissy (2019)
- Angelica Ulip (2019–20)
- Leanne Bautista (2019–20)
- Jose Sarasola (2020–21)
- Rabiya Mateo (2022)
- Ashley Rivera (2022)
- Michael Sager (2022–23)

== Accolades ==
Accolades received by Unang Hirit
Year	Award	Category	Recipient	Result	Ref.
1999	13th PMPC Star Awards for Television	Best Morning Show	Unang Hirit	Nominated	
1999	13th PMPC Star Awards for Television	Best Morning Show Hosts		Nominated	
2000	14th PMPC Star Awards for Television	Best Morning Show	Unang Hirit	Nominated	
2000	14th PMPC Star Awards for Television	Best Morning Show Hosts		Nominated	
2001	15th PMPC Star Awards for Television	Best Morning Show	Unang Hirit	Won	
2001	15th PMPC Star Awards for Television	Best Morning Show Hosts	Arnold Clavio, Lyn Ching, Miriam Quiambao, Suzie Entrata, Rhea Santos, Martin Andanar, Ivan Mayrina, Hans Montenegro	Won	
2002	16th PMPC Star Awards for Television	Best Morning Show	Unang Hirit	Won	
2002	16th PMPC Star Awards for Television	Best Morning Show Hosts	Arnold Clavio, Lyn Ching, Miriam Quiambao, Suzie Entrata, Rhea Santos, Martin Andanar, Ivan Mayrina, Hans Montenegro	Won	
2003	17th PMPC Star Awards for Television	Best Morning Show	Unang Hirit	Nominated	
2003	17th PMPC Star Awards for Television	Best Morning Show Hosts	Love Añover, Lyn Ching-Pascual, Arnold Clavio, Suzie Entrata-Abrera, TJ Manotoc, Daniel Razon, Eagle Riggs, Lhar Santiago, Rhea Santos	Nominated	
2004	Anak TV Seal Awards		Unang Hirit	Won	
2004	18th PMPC Star Awards for Television	Best Morning Show	Unang Hirit	Nominated	
2004	18th PMPC Star Awards for Television	Best Morning Show Hosts	Lyn Ching, Arnold Clavio, Suzi Entrata, Daniel Razon, Rhea Santos	Nominated	
2005	19th PMPC Star Awards for Television	Best Morning Show	Unang Hirit	Nominated	
2005	19th PMPC Star Awards for Television	Best Morning Show Hosts		Nominated	
2006	20th PMPC Star Awards for Television	Best Morning Show	Unang Hirit	Nominated	
2006	20th PMPC Star Awards for Television	Best Morning Show Hosts	Lyn Ching, Arnold Clavio, Susie Entrata-Abrera, Jolina Magdangal, Regine Tolentino	Nominated	
2007	21st PMPC Star Awards for Television	Best Morning Show	Unang Hirit	Nominated	
2007	21st PMPC Star Awards for Television	Best Morning Show Hosts	Drew Arellano, Lyn Ching, Arnold Clavio, Susie Entrata-Abrera, Jolina Magdangal, Eagle Riggs, Lhar Santiago, Regine Tolentino	Nominated	
2008	UP Gandingan Awards	Best Morning Show	Unang Hirit	Won	
2008	22nd PMPC Star Awards for Television	Best Morning Show	Unang Hirit	Won	
2008	22nd PMPC Star Awards for Television	Best Morning Show Hosts	Love Añover, Drew Arellano, Arnold Clavio, Lyn Ching-Pascual, Susie Entrata-Abrera, Jolina Magdangal, Winnie Monsod, Oscar Orbos, Eagle Riggs, Lhar Santiago, Rhea Santos, Regine Tolentino	Won	
2009	23rd PMPC Star Awards for Television	Best New Male TV Personality	JC Tiuseco	Nominated	
2009	23rd PMPC Star Awards for Television	Best Morning Show	Unang Hirit	Nominated	
2009	23rd PMPC Star Awards for Television	Best Morning Show Hosts	Drew Arellano, Lyn Ching-Pascual, Arnold Clavio, Susie Entrata-Abrera, Jolina Magdangal, Winnie Monsod, Eagle Riggs, Rhea Santos, Regine Tolentino	Nominated	
2010	24th PMPC Star Awards for Television	Best Morning Show	Unang Hirit	Nominated	
2010	24th PMPC Star Awards for Television	Best Morning Show Hosts	Drew Arellano, Lyn Ching-Pascual, Arnold Clavio, Susie Entrata-Abrera, Lhar Santiago, Rhea Santos	Nominated	
2011	Catholic Mass Media Awards	Best Public Service Program	Unang Hirit	Won	
2011	25th PMPC Star Awards for Television	Best Morning Show	Unang Hirit	Nominated	
2011	25th PMPC Star Awards for Television	Best Morning Show Hosts	Arnold Clavio, Rhea Santos, Suzie Entrata-Abrera, Lyn Ching, Connie Sison, Pia Arcangel, Susan Enriquez, Drew Arellano, Luane Dy, Monica Verallo	Nominated	
2012	26th PMPC Star Awards for Television	Best Morning Show	Unang Hirit	Nominated	
2012	26th PMPC Star Awards for Television	Best Morning Show Hosts	Love Anover, Pia Arcangel, Drew Arellano, Lyn Ching-Pascual, Arnold Clavio, Gaby Concepcion, Nathaniel Cruz, Luane Dy, Susan Enriquez, Suzi Entrata-Abrera, Ivan Mayrina, Winnie Monsod, Lhar Santiago, Rhea Santos, Connie Sison, Monica Verallo	Nominated	
2013	4th Northwest Samar State University Students Choice Awards	Best Morning Talk Show	Unang Hirit	Won	
2013	4th Northwest Samar State University Students Choice Awards	Best Morning Talk Show Host	Arnold Clavio	Won	
2013	27th PMPC Star Awards for Television	Best Morning Show	Unang Hirit	Nominated	
2013	27th PMPC Star Awards for Television	Best Morning Show Hosts	Arnold Clavio, Rhea Santos, Lyn Ching-Pascual, Suzi Entrata-Abrera, Danilo Federez, Lhar Santiago, Love Añover, Gaby Concepcion, Drew Arellano, Winnie Monsod, Pia Arcangel, Luane Dy, Connie Sison, Monica Verallo, Nathaniel Cruz, Tonipet Gaba, Susan Enriquez, Ivan Mayrina	Won	
2014	1st Paragala Central Luzon Media Awards	Best Morning Show	Unang Hirit	Won	
2014	1st Paragala Central Luzon Media Awards	Best Morning Show Host	Arnold Clavio	Won	
2014	28th PMPC Star Awards for Television	Best Morning Show	Unang Hirit	Nominated	
2014	28th PMPC Star Awards for Television	Best Morning Show Hosts	Arnold Clavio, Connie Sison, Ivan Mayrina, Lhar Santiago, Nathaniel Cruz, Pia Arcangel, Susan Enriquez, Suzy Entrata-Abrera	Nominated	
2015	29th PMPC Star Awards for Television	Best Morning Show	Unang Hirit	Won	
2015	29th PMPC Star Awards for Television	Best Morning Show Hosts	Arnold Clavio, Rhea Santos, Ivan Mayrina, Connie Sison, Susan Enriquez, Nathaniel Cruz, Lyn Ching-Pascual, Lhar Santiago, Suzi Entrata-Abrera, Luane Dy, Love Añover, Tonipet Gaba, Winnie Monsod, Regine Tolentino, Gaby Concepcion	Won	
2016	30th PMPC Star Awards for Television	Best Morning Show	Unang Hirit	Won	
2016	30th PMPC Star Awards for Television	Best Morning Show Hosts	Arnold Clavio, Rhea Santos, Ivan Mayrina, Connie Sison, Susan Enriquez, Nathaniel Cruz, Lyn Ching-Pascual, Lhar Santiago, Suzi Entrata-Abrera, Love Añover	Nominated	
2017	8th Northwest Samar State University Students' Choice Awards for Radio and Television Awards	Best Morning Show	Unang Hirit	Won	
2017	31st PMPC Star Awards for Television	Best Morning Show	Unang Hirit	Won	
2017	31st PMPC Star Awards for Television	Best Morning Show Hosts	Love Añover, Pia Arcangel, Lyn Ching, Arnold Clavio, Nathaniel Cruz, Susan Enriquez, Suzi Entrata-Abrera, Ivan Mayrina, Lhar Santiago, Connie Sison	Nominated	
2018	32nd PMPC Star Awards for Television	Best Morning Show	Unang Hirit	Nominated	
2018	32nd PMPC Star Awards for Television	Best Morning Show Hosts	Love Añover, Pia Arcangel, Lyn Ching, Arnold Clavio, Nathaniel Cruz, Susan Enriquez, Suzi Entrata, Ivan Mayrina, Lhar Santiago, Connie Sison	Won	
2019	Anak TV Seal Awards		Unang Hirit	Won	
2019	33rd PMPC Star Awards for Television	Best Morning Show	Unang Hirit	Won	
2019	33rd PMPC Star Awards for Television	Best Morning Show Hosts	Love Añover, Pia Arcangel, Lyn Ching, Arnold Clavio, Nathaniel Cruz, Susan Enriquez, Suzie Entrata, Ivan Mayrina, Lhar Santiago, Connie Sison	Nominated	
2021	34th PMPC Star Awards for Television	Best Morning Show	Unang Hirit	Nominated	
2021	34th PMPC Star Awards for Television	Best Morning Show Host	Arnold Clavio, Connie Sison, Susan Enriquez, Nathaniel Cruz, Lyn Ching, Suzie Entrata, Ivan Mayrina, Lhar Santiago, Mariz Umali, Love Añover	Nominated	
2023	35th PMPC Star Awards for Television	Best Morning Show	Unang Hirit	Won	
2023	35th PMPC Star Awards for Television	Best Morning Show Host	Arnold Clavio, Connie Sison, Susan Enriquez, Nathaniel Cruz, Lyn Ching-Pascual, Suzie Entrata- Abrera, Ivan Mayrina, Lhar Santiago, Mariz Umali, Love Añover	Won	
2023	45th Catholic Mass Media Awards	Best News Magazine	Unang Balita – Lenten Traditions	Won	
2024	6th Gawad Lasallianeta	Best Morning Show	Unang Hirit	Won	
2024	6th Gawad Lasallianeta	Most Outstanding Morning Show Hosts	Unang Hirit hosts	Won	
2024	Asian Academy Creative Awards	Best Documentary Series	Unang Balita: Ravaged by El Nino	Won	
2025	38th PMPC Star Awards for Television	Best Morning Show	Unang Hirit	Won	
2025	38th PMPC Star Awards for Television	Best Morning Show Host	Arnold Clavio, Susan Enriquez, Lyn Ching-Pascual, Suzy Entrata-Abrera, Ivan Mayrina, Mariz Umali, Matteo Guidicelli, Shaira Diaz, Kaloy Tingcungco, Anjo Pertierra, JR Royol, Gaby Concepcion	Won	
2025	37th PMPC Star Awards for Television	Best Morning Show	Unang Hirit	Won	
2025	37th PMPC Star Awards for Television	Best Morning Show Host	Lyn Ching-Pascual, Arnold Clavio, Shaira Diaz, Suzi Entrata-Abrera, Susan Enriquez, Shuvee Etrata, Cheska Fausto, Matteo Guidicelli, Sean Lucas, Ivan Mayrina, Anjo Peritierra, JR Royol, Kaloy Tingkungko and Mariz Umali	Won	
2025	Malabon Ahon Media Awards	Best Malabon Ahon News Feature (TV Category)	Unang Hirit	Won	
2025	6th ALTA Media Icon Awards	Best Morning Show	Unang Hirit	Won	
2025	6th ALTA Media Icon Awards	Best Morning Show Host	Shaira Diaz	Won	
