= Ivan Mayrina =

Filipino journalist (born 1976)

- Born: Ivan Ramesis Perez Mayrina; December 23, 1976 (age 49); Angeles City, Philippines
- Education: University of the Philippines Diliman
- Occupations: Broadcaster, journalist, reporter, and former segment producer
- Years active: 2000–present
- Employer: GMA Network (2000–present)
- Height: 6 ft 1 in (1.85 m)
- Spouse: Karen Tiongson (m. 2005)
- Children: 2

Ivan Ramesis Perez Mayrina (born December 23, 1976) is a Filipino broadcaster, journalist, reporter and news anchor. He is best known for his long-standing career with GMA Network, where he has served as a reporter, news producer, and anchor of flagship newscasts such as 24 Oras Weekend and host of Unang Hirit. Mayrina has covered major national events, justice and courts beats, and international stories throughout his career.

== Early life ==
Ivan Ramesis Perez Mayrina was born on December 23, 1976 in Angeles City, Pampanga and is currently based in Quezon City.

He finished his secondary education at the Holy Angel University in Angeles City and proceeded to the University of the Philippines Diliman, where he pursued his Bachelor of Arts in Communication Research at the state university's College of Mass Communication, graduating in April 1997.

Before entering broadcasting, he worked as a training officer at Ayala Life Insurance, Inc. in 1997.

== Career ==
He started his broadcasting career at GMA Network in 2000. His first on-camera news report was on May 1, 2001, when he was asked to quickly substitute for journalist Jiggy Manicad who was injured by a rock that hit his head during the EDSA III riots along Mendiola Street.

He is best known for being a host of the GMA News and Public Affairs shows 100% Pinoy! (2006–2007) and Pinoy Abroad (2005–2006), and a news anchor of QTV/Q's The Beat (formerly Sapulso) (2006–2011), News on Q (2005–2011) - all of which he was partnered with Rhea Santos (from 2005 to 2010) and Connie Sison (from 2010 to 2011), followed by the second tandem On Call: Serbisyong Totoo. Ngayon. (2011–2012); aired by GMA News TV (now GTV).

Aside from being a regular reporter of GMA News, he is currently a host and former segment producer of the morning show Unang Hirit (2000; since 2012), and a news anchor of GMA Flash Report and News TV Live (now News Live).

In May 2015, Mayrina anchored GMA Newsfeed, an interactive newscast which was broadcast nightly at 9PM on GMA News Facebook page until 2019, as he focused on hosting duties and replaced by various news reporters.

He replaced Jiggy Manicad as the anchor for 24 Oras Weekend in August 2018 and as rejoins also Pia Arcangel.

On September 5, 2025, Mayrina reaffirmed his long-term commitment to GMA by renewing his contract with the network, marking 25 years with the Kapuso home network. During the contract signing at GMA Network Center, executives praised his dedication and trusted journalism.

== Personal life ==
Mayrina is married to Karen Tiongson, a GMA News Researcher in 2005. They have two children.

== Filmography ==
Year	Title	Role	Notes	Ref.
2000–present	Saksi	Himself / Alternate anchor / field reporter	(with Rhea Santos)	
2000; 2010–present	Unang Hirit	Himself / Segment producer / Host	(Segment producer from 2000 until the same year and as a segment of Olympic Trivia, and became a host since 2010)	
2002–2016	GMA Flash Report	Himself / Special news anchor		
2004–present	24 Oras	Himself / Substitute anchor / Field reporter		
2004	24 Oras Special Edition	Himself / Special news anchor		
2005–present	Balitanghali	Himself / Substitute anchor / Field reporter		
2005–2011	News on Q	Himself / Anchor	with Rhea Santos (from 2005 to 2010) and Connie Sison (from 2010 to 2011)	
2005–2006	Pinoy Abroad	Himself / Host	(with Rhea Santos)	
2006–2007	100% Pinoy!	Himself / Host	with Rhea Santos, Kara David, Pia Arcangel and Raffy Tima	
2006–2011	The Beat (formerly Sapulso)	Himself / Host		
2008–2010	Case Unclosed	Himself / Guest host	replaced by Kara David, Rhea Santos and Tina Panganiban-Perez	
2007	Eat Bulaga!	Himself / Guest player		
2011–2014	Balita Pilipinas	Himself / Alternate anchor / Field reporter		
2011–2012	On Call: Serbisyong Totoo. Ngayon.	Himself / Host	(with Connie Sison)	
2011–2023	News Live (formerly News TV Live)	Himself / Self-anchor		
2011–present	State of the Nation (formerly State of the Nation with Jessica Soho)	Himself / Substitute anchor / Field reporter		
2012	Follow That Star	Himself / Guest	Featuring his life and family (as a segment of Follow That Reporter)	
2013	Brigada	Himself / Episode host	Episode: "Mga Anghel Na Digmaan"	
2014	Eat Bulaga!	Himself / Judges	(as a segment of You're My ForeigNOY)	
2014	The Ryzza Mae Show	Himself / Guest		
2014	Brigada	Himself / Episode host	Episode: "Mga Pinoy sa Gaza"	
2015	Sunday PinaSaya	Himself / Guest player	(as a segment of KantaRirit)	
2015–2019	GMA Newsfeed	Himself / News anchor		
2017	Eat Bulaga!	(as a segment of Jackpot en Poy)	Himself / Guest player	
2018	Eat Bulaga!	(as a segment of Guhit Bulaga Plus)	Himself / Guest player	
2018	Harry and Meghan: A Royal Wedding; The GMA News TV Special Coverage	Himself / Special news anchor	(with Mariz Umali)	
2018–present	24 Oras Weekend	Himself / Current anchor		
2019	I-Witness	Himself / Episode host	Episode: "Biyaheng EDSA" (replay episode on November 27, 2021)	
2019	Tonight with Arnold Clavio	Himself / Guest		
2020	24 Oras: News Alert	Himself / Self-anchor		
2020	I-Witness	Himself / Episode host	Episode: "Liga ng Pag-asa"	
2020	Eat Bulaga!	Himself / Choices	(as a segment of Bawal Judgmental)	
2020	New Normal: "Newsmaker"	Himself / Guest		
2021	Eat Bulaga!	Himself / Celebrity judge	(as a segment of Bawal Judgmental) (replay episode on January 16, 2022)	
2023	Family Feud	Himself / Guest player	with Jun Veneracion, Raffy Tima and Oscar Oida	
2024	Family Feud	Himself / Guest player	with Pia Arcangel, Nelson Canlas and Mariz Umali	
2025	Fast Talk with Boy Abunda	Himself	with Pia Arcangel	
2025	Biyaheng Totoo: Sana sa Eleksyon 2025 (Part 2)	Himself / Narration	Episode: "Sapat at Abot Kayang Pagkain sa Hapag Kainan"	

== Awards ==
- 20th PMPC Star Awards for Television
- 21st PMPC Star Awards for Television
- 22nd PMPC Star Awards for Television
- 23rd PMPC Star Awards for Television
- 24th PMPC Star Awards for Television
- 25th PMPC Star Awards for Television
- 26th PMPC Star Awards for Television
- 27th PMPC Star Awards for Television
- 28th PMPC Star Awards for Television
- 29th PMPC Star Awards for Television
