= News Live (Philippine TV program) =

Philippine television news show

- Title card from 2021 to 2023
- Also known as: News TV Live (Note: 2011–21.)
- Genre: News bulletin
- Country of origin: Philippines
- Original language: Tagalog

Production
- Production locations: Studio 2, GMA Network Center, Quezon City, Philippines
- Camera setup: Multiple-camera setup
- Running time: 2–4 minutes
- Production company: GMA Integrated News

Original release
- Network: GMA News TV (2011–21); GTV (2021–23)
- Release: February 28, 2011 – March 26, 2023

News Live, formerly known as News TV Live, is a Philippine television news broadcasting show broadcast by GMA News TV and GTV. It premiered on February 28, 2011, as News TV Live on GMA News TV and concluded on February 21, 2021. The program was renamed News Live on February 27, 2021, following the channel's rebranding to GTV. The show concluded on March 26, 2023.

== Overview ==
It features different news of the day, foreign exchange rates, and the stock market. The news update always ends with weather and live traffic updates from different key roads in Metro Manila via GMA Traffic System.
