= Ricky Reyes (hairdresser) =

Filipino hairdresser and businessman

- Born: Ricardo Enriquez Reyes; April 12, 1950 (age 76)
- Occupations: Television host; Entrepreneur
- Years active: 1970–present
- Partner: Cris Aquino
- Children: 4 (all adopted)

Ricardo Enriquez Reyes (born April 12, 1950) is a Filipino hairdresser, entrepreneur and television personality.

He is the owner of the Ricky Reyes chain of salons and host of the television program Gandang Ricky Reyes.

== Early life ==
Ricardo Enriquez Reyes was born on April 12, 1950. He was the eldest of seven children although he has three older half-brothers from his mother's earlier relationship.

His father (Note: Unclear if he was Reyes' biological or stepfather) was reportedly abusive and negligent, while his mother owned a beauty parlor and a grocery store and ran a buy-and-sell business. The family lived poverty.

He realized he is gay back in his childhood. His half-brothers would beat him up for being gay but Reyes insist they still loved him and they just don't want him to be ostracized for his identity.

He was an errand boy for his mother at age ten and helped marketed the family business in Divisoria.

== Career ==
=== Business career ===
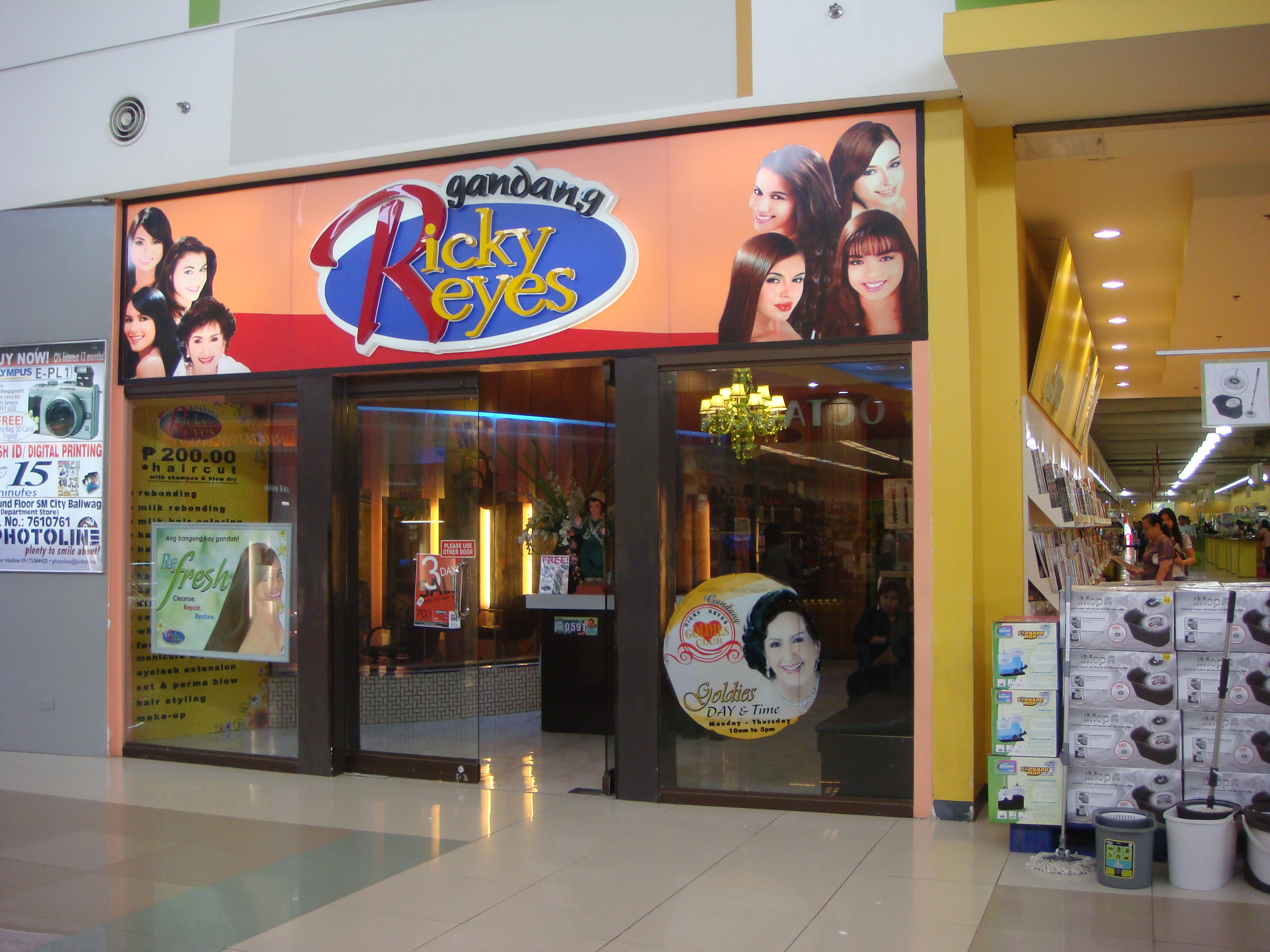
Gandang Ricky Reyes salon at SM City Baliuag.

In 1970, (Note: There are conflicting reports on the opening date of Ricky Reyes' salon: A 2004 report states it was in 1970, accompanied by a photograph of the salon in 1971.; A 2009 Philstar report states it was in 1973.) Ricky Reyes set up his first beauty parlor in a laundry shop in San Juan, Metro Manila. This was followed by three more salons along Legarda, Taft Avenue, and Blumentritt.

Reyes was offered by Henry Sy to open a parlor inside The SM Center North EDSA (now SM North EDSA). His store was the only other tenant beside the department store in the first six months of the shopping mall's operation in 1985. The partnership grew with Reyes often approaching the retail magnate for a retail space whenever an SM Supermalls outlet opens.

In 1986, Reyes won the Agora Award for being a medium-sized entrepreneur.

Reyes formed the Hairdressers and Cosmetologist Association of the Philippines (HACAP) to unify stakeholders in the industry. However disputes in the HACAP, led to Reyes and other hairdressers to form Filipino Hairdressers Cooperative (FilHair Coop).

Reportedly averse to acquiring loans or the franchise model, his hair salon business grew to 39 outlets in the Philippines by 2004.

Around the early-2000s, he acquired the land where the Golden Sunset Resort in Calatagan, Batangas which opened in 2005.

=== Philanthropy ===
In 1984, FilHair Coop initiated the "Isang Gunting, Isang Suklay" (lit. 'One scissor, One comb') program which gave free livelihood training in hairdressing. FilHair Coop also provided free hair cuts to indigents.

Reyes also set up the Ricky Reyes Learning Institute (RRLI), a vocational school which offers technical courses in cosmetology and hotel and restaurant services. The first RRLI opened in 1995.

In 2010, Reyes was cited by Forbes magazine as one of the 48 Heroes of Philanthropy list in the Asia-Pacific region.

== Labor issue ==
In 2015, Renato Nocos, a former employee of Reyes' chain of salons, filed a discrimination case against his employer. Reyes fired Nocos after he found out that he is positive with HIV. Reyes denied the claim. In February 2016, the National Labor Relations Commission found Reyes guilty on the said case and ordered him to reinstate Nocos in his job and pay 600,000 pesos worth of back wages and benefits.

Marcos Estrada, Reyes' lawyer, stated that his client appealed the decision that Nocos allegedly distorted the truth. He claimed that Reyes treated Nocos for his declared pulmonary tuberculosis diagnosis. Nocos was said to return to work and secured a medical certificate despite "still coughing" but admitted to having HIV and was asked to secure another certificate. Nocos did not return and went to the NLRC to file a complaint insisting he was not fired.

== Personal life ==
=== Family ===
Ricky Reyes is a gay man. He has been with his partner Cris Aquino who is a businessman since the 1970s. (Note: A 2004 report, desceibes Reyes and Aquino as a couple of 28-years which pegs the beginning of their relationship to 1976. A PEP.ph in 2019 described their relationship as approaching 50 years in three years which would peg the start of their relationship in 1972.) Reyes met Aquino when he was still performing drag revue in Taxco night club. Aquino was a back-up dancer in the now defunct venue. He has four adopted children; the first a son entrusted to him by a salon customer in the 1970s the second being a niece of his sister who emigrated to the United States, and the last two were siblings whose mother left the two to Reyes.

=== Views on the LGBTQ community ===
Despite being in a gay relationship, Reyes is against the legalization of same-sex marriage in the Philippines believing the institution to be the domain of the Catholic Church. He calls its supporters as "deluded" and "entitled". Reyes believes that the LGBTQ community should settle for tolerance. He believes that the community should keep oppression to themselves.

Reyes also opposes the SOGIE Bill claiming to have stop its passing into law, a claim that was disputed by Rainbow Rights Philippines which noted that Reyes is not even a legislator.

Despite identifying with the bakla label, he discourages gay men against crossdressing and presenting feminine. He adopted this worldview as he grew old, having sported a longer hair and feminine expression in his younger years.

Commenting on the transgender bathroom issue, Reyes insist that transgender people should "stay on their lane" and use the bathroom according to their genitals rather than the one which aligns their gender identity.

== Accolades ==
=== Business ===
- 1986 Agora Award
- 2009 Ernst & Young Entrepreneur of the Year-Philippines – Ur Van, Ur Business (UVUB) Inspiring Entrepreneur

=== Television ===
Year	Award giving body	Category	Nominated work	Results	Ref
2000	14th PMPC Star Awards for Television	Best Educational Program Host	Beauty School Plus	Won	
