= Pia Arcangel =

Filipino journalist (born 1978)

- Born: Maria Pia Concepcion Nieva Arcangel; December 8, 1978 (age 47); Manila, Philippines
- Education: Ateneo de Manila University (BA)
- Occupations: News anchor; reporter; host; journalist
- Years active: 2001–present
- Employers: ABS-CBN (2001–02); GMA Network (2002–present)
- Spouse: Mico Halili (m. 2004)
- Children: 1

Maria Pia Concepcion Nieva Arcangel-Halili (Tagalog: [ˈpija aɾkaŋˈhɛl]; born December 8, 1978) is a Filipino television news presenter and journalist.

== Career ==
Arcangel started as a courtside reporter for the UAAP basketball games aired over Studio 23 (now ABS-CBN Sports and Action) and in Metropolitan Basketball Association (MBA). In 2003, she became one of the hosts of the morning show Unang Hirit of GMA Network. She also hosted the children's show Art Angel with Tonipet Gaba and Krystal Reyes where she along with his co-hosts won awards during the 21st, 22nd and 23rd PMPC Star Awards for Television as Best Children Show Hosts. In QTV/Q (later GMA News TV, now GTV), she co-anchored Balitanghali with Raffy Tima for 9 years until Connie Sison permanently replaced her since November 10, 2014.

She is currently a co-anchor of 24 Oras Weekend and Saksi.

== Personal life ==
Arcangel is the daughter of Clotilde Nieva-Arcangel, Dean of the UST College of Education.

She finished high school at Assumption College San Lorenzo and graduated with a Bachelor of Arts degree in Communication Arts from the Ateneo de Manila University in 2000.

Arcangel has been married to sportscaster Mico Halili since 2003. She has 1 child, a daughter named Mickey.
