= Connie Sison =

Filipino journalist, reporter and host (born 1975)

- Born: Maria Perpetua Concepcion Del Rosario; December 8, 1975 (age 50); Pasig, Philippines
- Occupations: Newscaster; anchor; reporter; TV host
- Years active: 1997–present
- Employers: ABS-CBN (1997–2006); Radio Philippines Network (1997, 2006–07); GMA Network (2007–present)
- Television: Unang Hirit (2010–23); Pinoy M.D. (2010–2025); Balitanghali (2014–present)
- Spouse: Christopher James Escudero
- Children: 3

Maria Perpetua Concepcion "Connie" Del Rosario-Escudero (Tagalog: [ˈkɔnɪ ˈsisɔn]; born December 8, 1975) is a Filipino broadcast journalist, reporter, host, and news anchor. She is an anchor of the GTV newscast Balitanghali since 2014, and was one of the hosts of GMA Network's morning show Unang Hirit from 2010 until 2023. She also hosts Pinoy M.D. and its radio counterpart on Super Radyo DZBB 594, Pinoy M.D. sa Dobol B. Her hosting skills in Pinoy M.D. got her a Bantog award for Media Practitioner in Television given by Department of Science and Technology in 2018.

== Television career ==
In 1997, Sison was a walk-in applicant in RPN 9 for a position of a news anchor. Her first job was being a substitute anchor for Cielo Villaluna's co-anchor who was on leave that time. Her appearance at RPN 9 caught the attention of ABS-CBN where she also applied and subsequently joined Studio 23, ABS-CBN's sister network owned by ABS-CBN Corporation, as a features reporter and SNN (later rebranded as ANC). ABS-CBN promoted her after 8 months and she became a reporter for hard news in TV Patrol. Later on, Sison became an anchor of La Niña Watch, a program that focused on climate change, and she was also included in Hoy Gising!, ABS-CBN's public service show.

In 2001, Sison was included in ABS-CBN's morning program Alas Singko Y Medya as one of the show's hosts. Sison also hosted a reality television program called Kakasa Ka Ba? that she co-hosted with JV Villar. In 2006, she exited ABS-CBN through a retirement package. Sison returned to RPN 9 in the same year while awaiting for her non-compete clause to end. The only considered rival network of ABS-CBN at that time was GMA Network. Sison anchored evening newscast NewsWatch Aksyon Balita with Erwin Tulfo and Aljo Bendijo as their co-anchors for a year; Tulfo and Bendijo were her companions from ABS-CBN.

In 2007, 10 years of her career, as soon as her non-compete clause contract ended in ABS-CBN, Sison continued her career in GMA Network. She was entrusted to do several news and current affairs shows in GMA's main channel and its secondary network, Q Channel 11, which was later rebranded as GMA News TV and currently GTV. Among those shows were DoQmentaries (a monthly documentary program), News on Q, On Call: Siksik Sa Impormasyon. Bilis na Pag-Aksyon, and Balitanghali (a late morning newscast on GMA News TV and GTV which she co-hosted with Raffy Tima). In GMA's main channel, she is one of the hosts of the morning program Unang Hirit. She also hosts the medical-focused show Pinoy M.D., which got a radio version in DZBB (GMA's flagship radio station) and officially titled as Pinoy M.D. sa Dobol B.

In 2018, she is the very first recipient of the Bantog award for Media Practitioner in Television given by Department of Science and Technology as a result of her hosting of Pinoy M.D. She was also rewarded with a P100,000 cash, which she opted to give to the Kapuso Foundation as a donation. In 2020, her professionalism in her work was tested when she interviewed Senator Richard Gordon and she was unpleasantly interrupted by Gordon in the midst of the interview. Despite the situation, Sison remained calm and some netizens condemned Gordon's actions as being rude and lauded Sison's composure.

In 2023, she announced she will retire hosting Unang Hirit after 13 years to focus on her family and health, while she retains anchoring Balitanghali, and as a host of Pinoy MD and two of DZBB shows (Pinoy MD sa Super Radyo DZBB, and as a co-host of Arnold Clavio on One on One: Walang Personalan).

== Personal life ==
Connie Sison was born as Maria Perpetua Concepcion Sison Del Rosario on December 8, 1975, in Pasig, Philippines. She attended Maryknoll College during her elementary years. In college, she took up BS Psychology in Miriam College and graduated. Aside from being a broadcast journalist, she does painting as a hobby. She is married to entrepreneur Christopher James Escudero and they have three daughters. Filipino actor Martin del Rosario is her nephew (Martin's father is Connie's older brother, Robert del Rosario).

Sison was diagnosed with hypothyroidism and tried to confront the disease through doing exercise and proper diet.
