= Tonipet Gaba =

Filipino theater actor and television host (born 1978)

- Born: Antonio Jose Ongpauco Gaba; July 16, 1978 (age 48)
- Education: De La Salle University
- Occupations: Television presenter; theater actor; model; endorser; director
- Television: Art Angel; Pop Talk; Kada Umaga

Antonio Jose Ongpauco Gaba (born July 16, 1978) professionally known as Tonipet Gaba (Tagalog: [ˈtonipet ˈgɐbɐ]), is a Filipino theater actor, model, and television presenter. He is most notable for hosting the children's arts and crafts show, Art Angel, in 2004. Gaba also served as a longtime presenter of the magazine show, Pop Talk, on GTV (formerly GMA News TV) until his shift to NET25 in 2021. He currently co-hosts the network's morning show Love, Tonipet, and Everythaaang!, with co-host Love Añover.

== Early life and career ==
From a young age, Gaba was already fascinated in visual arts as he loved drawing and painting. He majored in Literature and Humanities at the De La Salle University, where he also had a newfound love for the stage.

=== Theater career ===
Gaba trained under Repertory Philippines. He performed in various plays such as the Philippine productions of Hans Christian Andersen's Honk! and Neil Simon's The Good Doctor. Due to his consecutive television projects, his theater career was put on hold until his comeback as Schroeder in the 2012 Philippine production of You're A Good Man, Charlie Brown, produced by 9 Works Theatrical.

=== Television career ===
==== 2002: NBN ====
Gaba appeared on the NBN children's educational show Eskwela ng Bayan in 2002. He starred in the segment "Karen's World" as a farmer named Inggo who learns English from Karen Kalabaw, a talking carabao, played by Monica Llamas.

==== 2004–2021: GMA Network ====
In 2004, he co-hosted the arts and crafts children's show, Art Angel, with Pia Arcangel and child actress Krystal Reyes. He remained throughout the entirety of the show, even after Arcangel left in 2010, who was replaced by actress Anne Barcelo. In a separate endeavor in 2008, Gaba directed the educational show, Batang Bibbo!, which also starred Barcelo. With the launching of GMA News TV, Gaba hosted the magazine show Pop Talk, since its premiere in March 2011. After a seven-year run, Art Angel concluded and was replaced by Sabadabadog! with Gaba as its host, until November 2011. He later joined the morning show Unang Hirit, reuniting with his former co-host, Arcangel.

During the COVID-19 pandemic in 2020, GMA News TV launched the series New Normal: The Survival Guide; Gaba, alongside Rovilson Fernandez, remotely hosted Home Work—an informative show sharing life hacks at home during the quarantine. GMA Network also aired a limited rerun of Art Angel in May; Gaba then addressed the former supporters of the show on social media while he expressed his hopes for the show to return someday with new episodes. In November of the same year, he resumed hosting Pop Talk after production was postponed. In October 2021, Gaba bid farewell as Pop Talk ended after its tenth year.

==== 2021–present: NET25 ====
Prior to Pop Talk's conclusion, Gaba already appears and co-hosts on the NET25 morning news and talk show, Kada Umaga, since its premiere in August 2021. He hosts the segments "Toni Knows" and "Tonipet's Take Out".

== Personal life ==
Gaba converted to Iglesia ni Cristo in 2022; he was welcomed personally and in social media by his Kada Umaga co-host, Wej Cudiamat. He also co-owns a creative agency where he serves as a film director.

== Credits ==
=== Theater ===
List of theater credits of Tonipet Gaba
Year	Title	Role	Producer	Venue	Refs.
2000	Once Upon A Mattress	Prince Dauntless	Repertory Philippines	William J. Shaw Theater, Shangri-la Plaza Mall	
2000	The Good Doctor	Government clerk	Repertory Philippines	William J. Shaw Theater, Shangri-la Plaza Mall	
2000	Kiss of the Spider Woman	Valentin	Repertory Philippines	William J. Shaw Theater, Shangri-la Plaza Mall	
2000	Murder For Rent	Romeo	Repertory Philippines	—N/a	
2001	Our Town	George	Repertory Philippines	Cultural Center of the Philippines Complex	
2001	The Little Mermaid	Calamari	Repertory Philippines	Meralco Theater	
2002	Lagi Kitang Naaalala (A Musical Tribute to Levi Celerio, Atang de la Rama, Lucio San Pedro)	Performer	Cultural Center of the Philippines	Cultural Center of the Philippines Complex	
2003	Lagi Kitang Naaalala (A Musical Tribute to Levi Celerio, Atang de la Rama, Lucio San Pedro)	Performer	Cultural Center of the Philippines	Cultural Center of the Philippines Complex	
2003	Honk! The Ugly Duckling	Cat	Trumpets	Meralco Theater	
2012	You’re a Good Man, Charlie Brown	Schroeder	9 Works Theatrical	Carlos P. Romulo Auditorium, RCBC Plaza	

=== Television ===
List of television credits of Tonipet Gaba
Year	Program	Notes	Refs.
2000	A Christmas Prayer: The ABS-CBN Christmas Special	Guest	
2002	Eskwela ng Bayan	Actor	
2004	Art Angel	Co-host	
2005	Pet.Ko	Host	
2007	Kids on Q	Host	
2007	Pinoy Meets World	Guest host	
2008	Batang Bibbo!	Director	
2009	Tara! Let's Eat!	Host	
2010	The Beat	Segment host	
2011	Sabadabadog!	Host	
2011	Pop Talk	Host	
2015	Alamat	Voice actor	
2020	New Normal: A Survival Guide – Home Work	Host	
2021–2023	Kada Umaga	Host	
2023	Love, Tonipet, and Everythaaang!	Host	

== Accolades ==
List of accolades received by Tonipet Gaba
Year	Event	Category/Award	Work	Result	Refs.
2007	21st PMPC Star Awards for Television	Best Children's Show Host	Art Angel	Won (Note: Nominated with co-hosts Pia Arcangel and Krystal Reyes.)	
2007	21st PMPC Star Awards for Television	Best Children's Show Host	Kids on Q	Nominated (Note: Nominated with Ella Guevara, Eugene Herrera and David Hubalde.)	
2008	22nd PMPC Star Awards for Television	Best Children's Show Host	Art Angel	Won	
2008	22nd PMPC Star Awards for Television	Best Children's Show Host	Kids on Q	Nominated (Note: Nominated with entire Kids on Q cast.)	
2011	ENPRESS Golden Screen TV Awards	Outstanding Lifestyle Program Host	Pop Talk	Nominated	
2011	25th PMPC Star Awards for Television	Best Children's Show Host	Art Angel	Won (Note: Nominated with Roxanne Barcelo.)	
2013	ENPRESS Golden Screen TV Awards	Outstanding Lifestyle Program Host	Pop Talk	Nominated	
2013	27th PMPC Star Awards for Television	Best Morning Show Host	Unang Hirit	Won (Note: Nominated with entire Unang Hirit hosts)	
2014	ENPRESS Golden Screen TV Awards	Outstanding Lifestyle Program Host	Pop Talk	Nominated	
2014	28th PMPC Star Awards for Television	Best Magazine Show Host	Pop Talk	Nominated	
2015	29th PMPC Star Awards for Television	Best Magazine Show Host	Pop Talk	Nominated	
2016	30th PMPC Star Awards for Television	Best Magazine Show Host	Pop Talk	Nominated	
2016	10th UPLB Gandingan Awards	Best Morning Show Hosts	Unang Hirit	Won	
2018	Kung-Gihan Awards 2018	Image of the Industry Hospitality Lifestyle TV Program Host of the Year	Pop Talk	Won	
2021	34th PMPC Star Awards for Television	Best Lifestyle Show Host	Pop Talk	Nominated	
