= 22nd PMPC Star Awards for Television =

- Date: November 30, 2008; December 2, 2008 (Delayed Telecast)
- Location: SMX Convention Center, SM Mall of Asia, Pasay
- Hosted by: Paolo Bediones; Gabby Concepcion; Anne Curtis; Judy Ann Santos

Television/radio coverage
- Network: TV5
- Produced by: MR Productions

The 22nd PMPC Star Awards for TV ceremony was held at the SMX Convention Center, SM Mall of Asia, Pasay on November 30, 2008, and broadcast over TV5 on December 2, 2008. The ceremony was hosted by Paolo Bediones, Gabby Concepcion, Anne Curtis and Judy Ann Santos and directed by Al Quinn.

== Nominees and winners ==
These are the nominations for the 22nd Star Awards for Television. The winners are in bold.

Network	Total # of Nominees
ABS-CBN	103
NBN	3
ABC	4
GMA	95
RPN	1
QTV	32
IBC	4
Studio 23	13
UNTV	8

Network	Total # of Winners (including Special Awards)
ABS-CBN	27
ABC	2
GMA	21
Q	5
Studio 23	1
UNTV	2

=== Best TV station ===
- ABS-CBN-2
- NBN-4
- ABC-5
- **GMA-7**
- RPN-9
- Q-11
- IBC-13
- Studio 23
- UNTV-37

=== Best Primetime TV Series ===
- **Lobo (ABS-CBN 2)**
- Impostora (GMA 7)
- Joaquin Bordado (GMA 7)
- La Vendetta (GMA 7)
- Ysabella (ABS-CBN 2)

=== Best Daytime Drama Series ===
- **Kaputol ng Isang Awit (GMA 7)**
- Maging Akin Ka Lamang (GMA 7)
- My Only Love (GMA 7)
- Prinsesa ng Banyera (ABS-CBN 2)

=== Best Drama Actor ===
- John Lloyd Cruz (Maging Sino Ka Man: Ang Pagbabalik / ABS-CBN 2)
- Tirso Cruz III (Kaputol ng Isang Awit / GMA 7)
- Ryan Eigenmann (Lobo / ABS-CBN 2)
- Mark Anthony Fernandez (Impostora / GMA 7),
- Sam Milby (Maging Sino Ka Man: Ang Pagbabalik / ABS-CBN 2)
- Robin Padilla (Joaquin Bordado / GMA 7)
- **Piolo Pascual (Lobo / ABS-CBN 2)**

=== Best Drama Actress ===
- Dina Bonnevie (Babangon Ako’t Dudurugin Kita / GMA 7)
- **Sunshine Dizon (Impostora / GMA 7)**
- Angel Locsin (Lobo / ABS-CBN 2)
- Lovi Poe (Kaputol ng Isang Awit / GMA 7)
- Coney Reyes (Ysabella / ABS-CBN 2)
- Judy Ann Santos (Ysabella / ABS-CBN 2)

=== Best Drama Anthology ===
- **Maalaala Mo Kaya (ABS-CBN 2)**
- Magpakailanman (GMA 7)
- Maynila (GMA 7)
- Your Song (ABS-CBN 2)

=== Best Single Performance by an Actress ===
- Helen Gamboa (Maalaala Mo Kaya: Mesa / ABS-CBN 2)
- **Angel Locsin (Maalaala Mo Kaya: Pilat / ABS-CBN 2)**
- Shaina Magdayao (Maalaala Mo Kaya: Telebisyon / ABS-CBN 2)
- Cherry Pie Picache (Maalaala Mo Kaya: Tren / ABS-CBN 2)
- Susan Roces (Maalaala Mo Kaya: Basura / ABS-CBN 2)
- Gloria Romero (Maalaala Mo Kaya: Singsing / ABS-CBN 2)

=== Best Single Performance by an Actor ===
- Gabby Concepcion (Maalaala Mo Kaya: Taxi / ABS-CBN 2)
- **Joshua Dionisio (Maalaala Mo Kaya: Sako / ABS-CBN 2)**
- Dolphy (Maalaala Mo Kaya: Bisikleta / ABS-CBN 2)
- Eddie Garcia (Maalaala Mo Kaya: Singsing / ABS-CBN 2)
- John Wayne Sace (Maalaala Mo Kaya: Mesa / ABS-CBN 2)
- Gary Valenciano (Maalaala Mo Kaya: Bag / ABS-CBN 2)

=== Best New Male TV Personality ===
- Jon Avila (Komiks Presents: Kapitan Boom / ABS-CBN 2)
- **Robi Domingo (ASAP ‘08 / ABS-CBN 2)**
- Josef Elizalde (ASAP ‘08 / ABS-CBN 2)
- Hayden Kho (SOP Rules / GMA 7)
- Bruce Quebral (Your Song Presents: One More Chance / ABS-CBN 2)
- Ferdz Recio (Born to Be Wild / GMA 7)

=== Best New Female TV Personality ===
- Marianna del Rio (Komiks Presents: Kapitan Boom / ABS-CBN 2)
- Maricris Garcia (SOP Rules / GMA 7)
- **Patricia Gayod (Maalaala Mo Kaya: Dagat / ABS-CBN 2)**
- Daiana Menezes (Eat Bulaga! / GMA 7)
- **Kylie Padilla (Joaquin Bordado / GMA 7)**
- Nicole Uysiuseng (ASAP ‘08 / ABS-CBN 2)

=== Best Gag Show ===
- Bubble Gang (GMA 7)
- **Goin' Bulilit (ABS-CBN 2)**
- Nuts Entertainment (GMA 7)

=== Best Comedy Show ===
- **Ful Haus (GMA 7)**
- John en Shirley (ABS-CBN 2)
- That's My Doc (ABS-CBN 2)

=== Best Comedy Actor ===
- **Ogie Alcasid (Bubble Gang / GMA 7)**
- Joey De Leon (Nuts Entertainment / GMA 7)
- Roderick Paulate (That’s My Doc / ABS-CBN 2)
- Vic Sotto (Ful Haus / GMA 7)
- Michael V. (Bubble Gang / GMA 7)
- Redford White (Kokey / ABS-CBN 2)

=== Best Comedy Actress ===
- Ai-Ai delas Alas (Komiks Presents: Volta / ABS-CBN 2)
- Pokwang (That’s My Doc / ABS-CBN 2)
- **Rufa Mae Quinto (Bubble Gang / GMA 7)**
- Susan Roces (John en Shirley / ABS-CBN 2)
- Sharlene San Pedro (Goin’ Bulilit / ABS-CBN 2)
- Maricel Soriano (John en Shirley / ABS-CBN 2)
- Nova Villa (That’s My Doc / ABS-CBN 2)

=== Best Musical Variety Show ===
- ASAP '08 (ABS-CBN 2)
- **SOP Rules (GMA 7)**
- Walang Tulugan with the Master Showman (GMA 7)

=== Best Variety Show ===
- **Eat Bulaga! (GMA 7)**
- **Wowowee (ABS-CBN 2)**

=== Best Female TV Host ===
- **Valerie Concepcion (Wowowee / ABS-CBN 2)**
- Toni Gonzaga (ASAP '08 / ABS-CBN 2)
- Pia Guanio (Eat Bulaga! / GMA 7)
- Pokwang (Wowowee / ABS-CBN 2)
- Regine Velasquez (SOP Rules / GMA 7)

=== Best Male TV Host ===
- Ogie Alcasid (SOP Rules /GMA 7)
- German Moreno (Walang Tulugan with the Master Showman / GMA 7)
- Martin Nievera (ASAP '08 / ABS-CBN 2)
- Willie Revillame (Wowowee / ABS-CBN 2)
- **Vic Sotto (Eat Bulaga! / GMA 7)**

=== Best Public Service Program ===
- **Bitag (UNTV 37)**
- Emergency (GMA 7)
- Imbestigador (GMA 7)
- S.O.C.O.: Scene of the Crime Operatives (ABS-CBN 2)
- Wish Ko Lang! (GMA 7)
- XXX: Exklusibong, Explosibong, Exposé (ABS-CBN 2)

=== Best Public Service Program Host ===
- Julius Babao, Karen Davila, and Henry Omaga-Diaz (XXX: Exklusibong, Explosibong, Exposé / ABS-CBN 2)
- Mike Enriquez (Imbestigador / GMA 7)
- Vicky Morales (Wish Ko Lang / GMA 7)
- Jessica Soho (Reunions / Q 11)
- **Ben Tulfo (Bitag / UNTV 37)**

=== Best Horror-Fantasy Program ===
- E.S.P. (GMA 7)
- Komiks Presents: Kapitan Boom (ABS-CBN 2)
- Super Inggo 1.5: Ang Bagong Bangis (ABS-CBN 2)
- Tasya Fantasya (GMA 7)
- **Volta (ABS-CBN 2)**

=== Best Reality Competition Program ===
- The Debutante (Q 11)
- Del Monte Fit 'n Right Got 2B Fit Challenge (ABS-CBN 2)
- **Gandang Ricky Reyes: Parlor Game (Q 11)**
- Hired! (Q 11)
- Kung Ako Ikaw (GMA 7)
- Pinoy Records (GMA 7)

=== Best Reality Competition Program Host ===
- Paolo Abrera and Mariz Umali (Hired! / Q 11)
- Keempee de Leon and Joey Marquez (Kung Ako Ikaw / GMA 7)
- Marc Nelson (The Debutante / Q 11)
- Manny Pacquiao and Chris Tiu (Pinoy Records / GMA 7)
- **Ricky Reyes (Gandang Ricky Reyes: Parlor Game / Q 11)**
- Mariel Rodriguez (Del Monte Fit 'n Right Got 2B Fit Challenge / ABS-CBN 2)

=== Best Game Show ===
- All Star K!: The P1 Million Videoke Challenge (GMA 7)
- GoBingo (GMA 7)
- **Pilipinas, Game KNB? (ABS-CBN 2)**
- Tok! Tok! Tok! Isang Milyon Pasok! (GMA 7)

=== Best Game Show Host ===
- Paolo Bediones (Tok! Tok! Tok! Isang Milyon Pasok! / GMA 7)
- Arnel Ignacio (GoBingo / GMA 7)
- Jaya and Allan K. (All-Star K: The P1 Million Videoke Challenge / GMA 7)
- **Edu Manzano (Pilipinas, Game KNB? / ABS-CBN 2)**

=== Best Talent Search Program ===
- Coca-Cola Ride to Fame: Yes to Your Dreams! (GMA 7)
- Move: The Search for Billy Crawford's Pinoy Dancers (GMA 7)
- **Shall We Dance? (ABC 5)**
- U Can Dance: Version 2 (ABS-CBN 2)

=== Best Talent Search Program Host ===
- Drew Arellano and Karel Marquez (Coca-Cola Ride to Fame: Yes to Your Dreams! / GMA 7)
- Billy Crawford (Move: The Search for Billy Crawford's Pinoy Dancers / GMA 7)
- **Arnel Ignacio, Dominic Ochoa and Lucy Torres-Gomez (Shall We Dance? / ABC 5)**
- Derek Ramsay and Iya Villania (U Can Dance: Version 2 / ABS-CBN 2)

=== Best Youth Oriented Program ===
- **Boys Nxt Door (GMA 7)**
- Gokada Go! (ABS-CBN 2)
- Star Magic Presents: Abt Ur Luv, Ur Lyf 2 (ABS-CBN 2)
- Star Magic Presents: Astigs (ABS-CBN 2)

=== Best Educational Program ===
- Born to Be Wild (GMA 7)
- Busog Lusog (ABS-CBN 2)
- Chef to Go (Q 11)
- Kabuhayang Swak na Swak (ABS-CBN 2)
- Ka-Toque (Q 11)
- **Matanglawin (ABS-CBN 2)**

=== Best Educational Program Host ===
- **Kim Atienza (Matanglawin / ABS-CBN 2)**
- Christine Bersola-Babao and Ruben Gonzaga (Busog Lusog / ABS-CBN 2)
- Jeramiah Favia, Luis Rey Logarta, Darl Christian Lopez, Mariemiel Sison, and Jonah Sebastian Trinidad (Ka-Toque / Q 11)
- Romi Garduce and Ferdz Recio (Born to Be Wild / GMA 7)
- Uma Khouny and Amy Perez (Kabuhayang Swak na Swak / ABS-CBN 2)
- Rob Pengson (Chef To Go / Q 11)

=== Best Celebrity Talk Show ===
- **Boy & Kris (ABS-CBN 2)**
- Moms (Q 11)
- Sharon (ABS-CBN 2)
- SiS (GMA 7)
- The Sweet Life (Q 11)

=== Best Celebrity Talk Show Host ===
- **Boy Abunda and Kris Aquino (Boy and Kris / ABS-CBN 2)**
- Gelli de Belen, Janice de Belen, and Carmina Villarroel (SiS / GMA 7)
- Lani Mercado, Manilyn Reynes and Sherilyn Reyes (Moms / Q 11)
- Wilma Doesnt and Lucy Torres-Gomez (The Sweet Life / Q 11)
- Jaya (One Proud Mama / Q 11)

=== Best Documentary Program ===
- The Correspondents (ABS-CBN 2)
- **i-Witness (GMA 7)**
- Probe (ABS-CBN 2)
- Reporter's Notebook (GMA 7)

=== Best Documentary Program Host ===
- **Sandra Aguinaldo, Kara David, Howie Severino and Jay Taruc (i-Witness / GMA 7)**
- Robert Alejandro, Adrian Ayalin, Che Che Lazaro, Hera Sanchez, Akiko Thomson and Pinky Webb (Probe / ABS-CBN 2)
- Karen Davila, Abner Mercado, Ces Drilon and Bernadette Sembrano (The Correspondents / ABS-CBN 2)
- Jiggy Manicad and Maki Pulido (Reporter's Notebook / GMA 7)

=== Best Documentary Special ===
- Harapan: The Jun Lozada Expose (ABS-CBN 2)
- Koneksiyon: Anatomy of a Political Scandal (GMA 7)
- Runaways: Human Trafficking Sa Jordan (ABS-CBN 2)
- **Signos: Ang Banta ng Nagbabagong Klima (GMA 7)**
- Sisid: Underwater Special (GMA 7)

=== Best Magazine Show ===
- 100% Pinoy (GMA 7)
- Kapuso Mo, Jessica Soho (GMA 7)
- Mel and Joey (GMA 7)
- Proudly Filipina (Q 11)
- **Rated K (ABS-CBN 2)**

=== Best Magazine Show Host ===
- Joey de Leon and Mel Tiangco (Mel and Joey / GMA 7)
- Charlene Gonzalez (Proudly Filipina / Q 11)
- Miriam Quiambao and Joaquin Valdez (100% Pinoy / GMA 7)
- **Korina Sanchez (Rated K / ABS-CBN 2)**
- Jessica Soho (Kapuso Mo, Jessica Soho / GMA 7)

=== Best News Program ===
- 24 Oras (GMA 7)
- Bandila (ABS-CBN 2)
- Big News (ABC 5)
- Sentro (ABC 5)
- Saksi (GMA 7)
- **TV Patrol World (ABS-CBN 2)**

=== Best Male Newscaster ===
- Martin Andanar (Sentro / ABC 5)
- **Julius Babao (TV Patrol World / ABS-CBN 2)**
- Arnold Clavio (Saksi / GMA 7)
- Mike Enriquez (24 Oras / GMA 7)
- Ted Failon (TV Patrol World / ABS-CBN 2)
- Alex Santos (TV Patrol Sabado and TV Patrol Linggo / ABS-CBN 2)

=== Best Female Newscaster ===
- Cherie Mercado (Big News / ABC 5)
- Karen Davila (TV Patrol World / ABS-CBN 2)
- Precious Hipolito (IBC Express Balita / IBC 13)
- **Vicky Morales (Saksi / GMA 7)**
- Ces Drilon (Bandila / ABS-CBN 2)
- Korina Sanchez (Bandila / ABS-CBN 2)
- Mel Tiangco (24 Oras / GMA 7)
- Bernadette Sembrano (TV Patrol Sabado and TV Patrol Linggo / ABS-CBN 2)

=== Best Morning Show ===
- Good Morning Kuya (UNTV 37)
- One Morning (NBN 4)
- Umagang Kay Ganda (ABS-CBN 2)
- **Unang Hirit (GMA 7)**

=== Best Morning Show Host ===
- **Love Añover, Drew Arellano, Arnold Clavio, Lyn Ching-Pascual, Susie Entrata-Abrera, Jolina Magdangal, Winnie Monsod, Oscar Orbos, Eagle Riggs, Lhar Santiago, Rhea Santos and Regine Tolentino (Unang Hirit / GMA 7)**
- Tony Arevalo, Chris dela Cruz, Allan Encarnacion, Aida Gonzales, Janice Gotardo, Rene Jose, Lola Sela, Krist Melecio, Sahlee Piamonte, Ryan Ramos and Daniel Razon (Good Morning Kuya / UNTV 37)
- Kim Atienza, Winnie Cordero, Ogie Diaz, Edu Manzano, Rica Peralejo, Donita Rose, *Alex Santos, Bernadette Sembrano, Anthony Taberna and Pinky Webb (Umagang Kay Ganda / ABS-CBN 2)
- Aljo Bendijo, Nikki Jimenez, Chal Lontoc, Claudine Trillo, and Bobby Yan (One Morning / NBN 4)

=== Best Public Affairs Program ===
- Hot Seat (Q 11)
- Review Philippines (Q 11)
- Up Close and Personal (IBC 13)
- **Y Speak (Studio 23)**

=== Best Public Affairs Program Host ===
- Atom Araullo and Bianca Gonzalez (Y Speak / Studio 23)
- Marissa del Mar (Up Close and Personal / IBC 13)
- Mike Enriquez (Review Philippines / Q 11)
- **Jessica Soho (Hot Seat / Q 11)**

=== Best Showbiz Oriented Talk Show ===
- **The Buzz (ABS-CBN 2)**
- Chika Mo, Chika Ko (UNTV 37)
- Entertainment Live (ABS-CBN 2)
- The Ricky Lo Exclusives (Q 11)
- Showbiz Central (GMA 7)
- Startalk (GMA 7)

=== Best Male Showbiz Oriented Talk Show Host ===
- **Boy Abunda (The Buzz / ABS-CBN 2)**
- Raymond Gutierrez (Showbiz Central / GMA 7)
- Ricky Lo (The Ricky Lo Exclusives / Q 11)
- Luis Manzano (Entertainment Live / ABS-CBN 2)

=== Best Female Showbiz Oriented Talk Show Host ===
- **Cristy Fermin (The Buzz / ABS-CBN 2)**
- Toni Gonzaga (Entertainment Live / ABS-CBN 2)
- Pia Guanio (Showbiz Central / GMA 7)
- Rufa Mae Quinto (Showbiz Central / GMA 7)
- **Ruffa Gutierrez (The Buzz / ABS-CBN 2)**
- Lolit Solis (Startalk / GMA 7)

=== Best Children Show ===
- 5 and a Half (Studio 23)
- **Art Angel (GMA 7)**
- Kids on Q (Q 11)
- KNC: Kawan Ng Cordero (UNTV 37)
- Sineskwela (Studio 23)

=== Best Children Show Host ===
- Renford Alano, Aria Cariño, Isabella Dayto, Romina De Jesus, Mikee De Vega, Tonipet Gaba, Caleb Gotico, Ella Guevarra, Eugene Herrera, David Hubalde, Nikki Liu, Sam Turingan (Kids On Q / Q 11)
- **Pia Arcangel, Tonipet Gaba, and Krystal Reyes (Art Angel / GMA 7)**
- Roselle Aquino, Eric Cabobos, Cedie Caisip, Joshua Dapun, Anjene Manalang, JR Melecio, Maysie Mirani, JP Ramirez and Mikee Samson (KNC: Kawan Ng Cordero / UNTV 37)
- Tado Jimenez, Shiela May Junsay and Bombi Plata (Sineskwela / Studio 23)
- Brisbane, Chacha Cañete, Rafael John Tanagon, Rhea Jane Tanagon and Russ John Tanagon (5 and a Half / Studio 23)

=== Best Travel Show ===
- Balikbayan (Q 11)
- **Pinoy Meets World (GMA 7)**
- Trip na Trip (ABS-CBN 2)
- Travel Time (Studio 23)
- WOW: What’s On Weekend (Studio 23)

=== Best Travel Show Host ===
- Drew Arellano (Balikbayan / Q 11)
- Susan Calo-Medina and Lui Villaruz (Travel Time / Studio 23)
- **Katherine de Castro, Jayson Gainza, Franzen Fajardo, Kian Kazemi and Uma Khouny (Trip na Trip / ABS-CBN 2)**
- Josephine Duterte, Loida Lagunay, Joel Mendez and Josephine Sanchez (WOW: What’s On Weekend / Studio 23)
- GMA News and Public Affairs Team (Pinoy Meets World / GMA 7)

=== Best Lifestyle Show ===
- Fit and Fab (Q 11)
- Kay Susan Tayo! (GMA 7)
- **Living It Up (Q 11)**
- Urban Zone (ABS-CBN 2)
- Us Girls (Studio 23)

=== Best Lifestyle Show Host ===
- Angel Aquino, Cheska Garcia and Iya Villania (Us Girls / Studio 23)
- Susan Enriquez (Kay Susan Tayo / GMA 7)
- **Raymond Gutierrez, Issa Litton, Sam Oh and Tim Yap (Living It Up / Q 11)**
- Anna Theresa Licaros and Maggie Wilson (Fit and Fab / Q 11)
- Daphne Oseña-Paez (Urban Zone / ABS-CBN 2)

== Special awards ==
=== Ading Fernando Lifetime Achievement Awardee ===
- Rosa Rosal

=== Excellence in Broadcasting Awardee ===
- Rolly "Lakay" Gonzalo (Male)
- Loren Legarda (Female)

=== Stars of the Night ===
- Luis Manzano (Male)
- Rufa Mae Quinto (Female)

== See also ==
- PMPC Star Awards for TV
