= 21st PMPC Star Awards for Television =

- Date: November 18, 2007; November 25, 2007 (Delayed Telecast)
- Location: Henry Lee Irwin Theater, Ateneo de Manila University, Quezon City
- Hosted by: Boy Abunda; Pops Fernandez; Ara Mina; Lorna Tolentino

Television/radio coverage
- Network: RPN
- Produced by: Starview Productions

The 21st PMPC Star Awards for Television ceremony was held at the Henry Lee Irwin Theater in Ateneo de Manila University, Quezon City on November 18, 2007 and broadcast over RPN 9 on November 25, 2007. The ceremony was hosted by Boy Abunda, Pops Fernandez, Ara Mina and Lorna Tolentino and directed by Arlene Tolibas.

== Nominees and winners ==
These are the nominations for the 21st Star Awards for Television. The winners are in bold.

Network	Total # of Nominees
ABS-CBN	98
NBN	5
ABC	16
GMA	99
RPN	6
QTV	33
IBC	7
Studio 23	11
UNTV	5

Network	Total # of Winners (including Special Awards)
ABS-CBN	32
GMA	19
Q	5
IBC	2
UNTV	1

=== Best TV station ===
- **ABS-CBN-2**
- NBN-4
- ABC-5
- GMA-7
- RPN-9
- Q-11
- IBC-13
- Studio 23
- UNTV-37

=== Best Primetime TV Series ===
- Bakekang (GMA 7)
- Bituing Walang Ningning (ABS-CBN 2)
- **Maging Sino Ka Man (ABS-CBN 2)**
- Maria Flordeluna (ABS-CBN 2)
- Sana Maulit Muli (ABS-CBN 2)
- Walang Kapalit (ABS-CBN 2)

=== Best Daytime Drama Series ===
- Daisy Siete (GMA 7)
- Makita Ka Lang Muli (GMA 7)
- Muli (GMA 7)
- Princess Charming (GMA 7)
- **Sinasamba Kita (GMA 7)**

=== Best Weekly Drama Series ===
- **Love Spell (ABS-CBN 2)**
- Love to Love (GMA 7)

=== Best Drama Actor ===
- Carlo Aquino (Sinasamba Kita / GMA 7)
- **John Lloyd Cruz (Maging Sino Ka Man / ABS-CBN 2)**
- Sam Milby (Maging Sino Ka Man / ABS-CBN 2)
- Makisig Morales (Super Inggo / ABS-CBN 2)
- Diether Ocampo (Palimos ng Pag-Ibig / ABS-CBN 2)
- Piolo Pascual (Walang Kapalit / ABS-CBN 2)
- Roderick Paulate (Makita Ka Lang Muli / GMA 7)

=== Best Drama Actress ===
- Bea Alonzo (Maging Sino Ka Man / ABS-CBN 2)
- Claudine Barretto (Walang Kapalit / ABS-CBN 2)
- Sheryl Cruz (Sinasamba Kita / GMA 7)
- Anne Curtis (Maging Sino Ka Man / ABS-CBN 2)
- Angelika dela Cruz (Bituing Walang Ningning / ABS-CBN 2)
- Ai Ai delas Alas (Bituing Walang Ningning / ABS-CBN 2)
- **Sunshine Dizon (Bakekang / GMA 7)**
- Angel Locsin (Asian Treasures / GMA 7)
- Manilyn Reynes (Bakekang / GMA 7)
- Jodi Sta. Maria (Walang Kapalit / ABS-CBN 2)

=== Best Drama Anthology ===
- Dahil Sa ‘Yong Paglisan (Q 11)
- **Maalaala Mo Kaya (ABS-CBN 2)**
- Magpakailanman (GMA 7)
- Maynila (GMA 7)
- Your Song (ABS-CBN 2)

=== Best Single Performance by an Actress ===
- Gina Alajar (Magpakailanman: Liyab Ng Pag-Asa / GMA 7)
- Jaclyn Jose (Dahil Sa ‘Yong Paglisan: Seaman / Q 11)
- **Pauleen Luna (Magpakailanman: Sa Dulo Ng Pag-Ibig / GMA 7)**
- **Gina Pareño (Maalaala Mo Kaya: Rehas / ABS-CBN 2)**
- Cherry Pie Picache (Maalaala Mo Kaya: Korte / ABS-CBN 2)
- Lorna Tolentino (Magpakailanman: Hiram Na Haplos / GMA 7)

=== Best Single Performance by an Actor ===
- Nash Aguas (Maalaala Mo Kaya: Poon / ABS-CBN 2)
- Tirso Cruz III (Maalaala Mo Kaya: Patalim / ABS-CBN 2)
- Joross Gamboa (Maalaala Mo Kaya: Cellphone / ABS-CBN 2)
- Jhong Hilario (Maalaala Mo Kaya: Rehas / ABS-CBN 2)
- **Piolo Pascual (Maalaala Mo Kaya: Piso / ABS-CBN 2)**
- Bembol Roco (Maalaala Mo Kaya: Korte / ABS-CBN 2)
- Dennis Trillo (Unico Hijo / GMA-7)

=== Best New Male TV Personality ===
- **Gerald Anderson (Sana Maulit Muli / ABS-CBN 2)**
- Matt Evans (Komiks Presents: The Adventures of Pedro Penduko / ABS-CBN 2)
- Aldred Gatchalian (Star Magic Presents: Abt Ur Luv / ABS-CBN 2)
- **Ronnie Liang (ASAP '07 / ABS-CBN 2)**
- Richie Macapagal (John En Shirley / ABS-CBN 2)
- Zanjoe Marudo (Aalog-Alog / ABS-CBN 2)
- Prince Stefan (SOP Rules / GMA 7)
- Ryan Yllana (Captain Barbell / GMA 7)

=== Best New Female TV Personality ===
- **Kim Chiu (Sana Maulit Muli / ABS-CBN 2)**
- Jewel Mische (Magic Kamison / GMA 7)
- **Lovi Poe (Bakekang / GMA 7)**
- Rhian Ramos (Captain Barbell / GMA 7)
- Chariz Solomon (StarTalk / GMA 7)

=== Best Gag Show ===
- **Bubble Gang (GMA 7)**
- Goin' Bulilit (ABS-CBN 2)
- Nuts Entertainment (GMA 7)
- Teka Mona (ABC 5)
- Wazzup Wazzup (Studio 23)

=== Best Comedy Show ===
- Aalog-Alog (ABS-CBN 2)
- Ay! Robot (Q 11)
- **Bahay Mo Ba 'To? (GMA 7)**
- Daddy Di Do Du (GMA 7)
- John En Shirley (ABS-CBN 2)
- Who's Your Daddy Now? (GMA 7)

=== Best Comedy Actor ===
- **Ogie Alcasid (Bubble Gang / GMA 7)**
- Keempee de Leon (Bahay Mo Ba 'To? / GMA 7)
- Joey De Leon (Nuts Entertainment / GMA 7)
- Vic Sotto (Ful Haus / GMA 7)
- Michael V. (Bubble Gang / GMA 7)

=== Best Comedy Actress ===
- Toni Gonzaga (Wazzup Wazzup / Studio 23)
- Julia Lopez (Who's Your Daddy Now? / GMA 7)
- **Pokwang (Aalog-Alog / ABS-CBN 2)**
- **Tiya Pusit (Bahay Mo Ba 'To? / GMA 7)**
- Maricel Soriano (John en Shirley / ABS-CBN 2)

=== Best Musical Variety Show ===
- **ASAP '07 (ABS-CBN 2)**
- SOP Rules (GMA 7)
- Walang Tulugan with the Master Showman (GMA 7)

=== Best Variety Show ===
- **Eat Bulaga! (GMA 7)**
- Wowowee (ABS-CBN 2)

=== Best Female TV Host ===
- Jackie Lou Blanco (Walang Tulugan with the Master Showma / GMA 7)
- Toni Gonzaga (ASAP '08 / ABS-CBN 2)
- Pia Guanio (Eat Bulaga! / GMA 7)
- **Janelle Jamer (Wowowee / ABS-CBN 2)**
- Regine Velasquez (SOP Rules / GMA 7)

=== Best Male TV Host ===
- Ogie Alcasid (SOP Rules /GMA 7)
- Joey de Leon (Eat Bulaga! / GMA 7)
- Luis Manzano (ASAP '07 / ABS-CBN 2)
- German Moreno (Walang Tulugan with the Master Showman / GMA 7)
- Piolo Pascual (ASAP '07 / ABS-CBN 2)
- **Willie Revillame (Wowowee / ABS-CBN 2)**
- Vic Sotto (Eat Bulaga! / GMA 7)

=== Best Public Service Program ===
- **Bitag (UNTV 37)**
- Emergency (GMA 7)
- Imbestigador (GMA 7)
- Nagmamahal, Kapamilya (ABS-CBN 2)
- Sana'y Muling Makapiling (Q 11)
- S.O.C.O.: Scene of the Crime Operatives (ABS-CBN 2)
- Wish Ko Lang! (GMA 7)
- XXX: Exklusibong, Explosibong, Exposé (ABS-CBN 2)

=== Best Public Service Program Host ===
- Gus Abelgas (S.O.C.O.: Scene of the Crime Operatives / ABS-CBN 2)
- Julius Babao, Karen Davila, and Henry Omaga-Diaz (XXX: Exklusibong, Explosibong, Exposé / ABS-CBN 2)
- Arnold Clavio (Emergency / GMA 7)
- Mike Enriquez (Imbestigador / GMA 7)
- **Vicky Morales (Wish Ko Lang! / GMA 7)**
- Jessica Soho (Sana'y Muling Makapiling / Q 11)
- Ben Tulfo (Bitag / UNTV 37)

=== Best Horror-Fantasy Program ===
- Ang Mahiwagang Baul (GMA 7)
- Fantastic Man (GMA 7)
- **Komiks Presents: Da Adventures of Pedro Penduko (ABS-CBN 2)**
- Magic Kamison (GMA 7)
- Mga Kuwento ni Lola Basyang (GMA 7)

=== Best Reality Competition Program ===
- **Here Comes the Bride (Q 11)**
- May Trabaho Ka! (Q 11)

=== Best Reality Competition Program Host ===
- Paolo Abrera and Mariz Umali (May Trabaho Ka! / Q 11)
- **Christine Jacob (Here Comes the Bride / Q 11)**

=== Best Game Show ===
- All Star K!: The P1 Million Videoke Challenge (GMA 7)
- Games Up Late Live! (ABS-CBN 2)
- Now Na! (Q 11)
- **Pilipinas, Game KNB? (ABS-CBN 2)**

=== Best Game Show Host ===
- Kris Aquino (Pilipinas, Game KNB? / ABS-CBN 2)
- Arnel Ignacio (Now Na! / Q 11)
- Jaya and Allan K. (All-Star K: The P1 Million Videoke Challenge / GMA 7)
- Jaymee Joaquin (Games Uplate Live / ABS-CBN 2)
- **Edu Manzano (Pilipinas, Game KNB? / ABS-CBN 2)**

=== Best Talent Search Program ===
- Little Big Superstar (ABS-CBN 2)
- Pinoy Pop Superstar (GMA 7)
- Popstar Kids (Q 11)
- **StarStruck: The Next Level (GMA 7)**
- Shall We Dance? (ABC 5)
- U Can Dance: Version 2 (ABS-CBN 2)

=== Best Talent Search Program Host ===
- Drew Arellano and Kyla (Popstar Kids / Q 11)
- **Dingdong Dantes, Raymond Gutierrez and Jolina Magdangal (StarStruck: The Next Level / GMA 7)**
- Sarah Geronimo and Makisig Morales (Little Big Superstar / ABS-CBN 2)
- Arnel Ignacio, Dominic Ochoa and Lucy Torres-Gomez (Shall We Dance? / ABC 5)
- Derek Ramsay and Iya Villania (U Can Dance / ABS-CBN 2)
- Regine Velasquez (Pinoy Pop Superstar / GMA 7)

=== Best Youth Oriented Program ===
- Gokada Go! (ABS-CBN 2)
- Let's Go! (ABS-CBN 2)
- POSH (Q 11)
- **Star Magic Presents: Abt Ur Luv (ABS-CBN 2)**

=== Best Educational Program ===
- Ating Alamin (IBC 13)
- **Gandang Ricky Reyes (Q 11)**
- Island Flavors (ABC 5)
- Kabuhayang Swak na Swak (ABS-CBN 2)
- Ka-Toque: Lutong Barkada (Q 11)

=== Best Educational Program Host ===
- Gigi Angkaw (Island Flavors / ABC 5)
- Rosebud Benitez, JL Cang, Niño Logarta, Darlo Lopez, Mitchie Sison and Jonah Trinidad (Ka-Toque: Lutong Barkada / QTV 11)
- Gerry Geronimo (Ating Alamin / IBC 13)
- Uma Khouny, Amy Perez and Chase Tinio (Kabuhayang Swak Na Swak / ABS-CBN)
- **Ricky Reyes (Gandang Ricky Reyes / Q 11)**

=== Best Celebrity Talk Show ===
- Homeboy (ABS-CBN 2)
- Moms (Q 11)
- Sharon (ABS-CBN 2)
- **SiS (GMA 7)**
- The Sweet Life (Q 11)
- T.E.E.N.S. (ABC 5)

=== Best Celebrity Talk Show Host ===
- **Boy Abunda (Homeboy / ABS-CBN 2)**
- Sharon Cuneta (Sharon / ABS-CBN 2)
- Gelli de Belen, Janice de Belen, and Carmina Villarroel (SiS / GMA 7)
- Paw Diaz, Edgar Allan Guzman, Princess Ryan and PJ Valerio (T.E.E.N.S. / ABC 5)
- Wilma Doesnt and Lucy Torres-Gomez (The Sweet Life / Q 11)
- Lani Mercado, Manilyn Reynes and Sherilyn Reyes (Moms / Q 11)

=== Best Documentary Program ===
- The Correspondents (ABS-CBN 2)
- Dokyu: Ang Bagong Mata ng Documentaries (ABC 5)
- Frontlines (ABC 5)
- **i-Witness (GMA 7)**
- Reporter's Notebook (GMA 7)

=== Best Documentary Program Host ===
- **Sandra Aguinaldo, Kara David, Howie Severino and Jay Taruc (i-Witness / GMA 7)**
- Cesar Apolinario, Jiggy Manicad and Maki Pulido (Reporter's Notebook / GMA 7)
- Karen Davila, Abner Mercado, Ces Drilon and Bernadette Sembrano (The Correspondents / ABS-CBN 2)
- Pat Evangelista (Dokyu: Ang Bagong Mata ng Documentaries / ABC 5)
- Ed Lingao (Frontlines / ABC 5)

=== Best Documentary Special ===
- **9/11: The Philippine Connection (ABS-CBN 2)**
- Ang Pagbabalik (ABC 5)
- Philippine Agenda (GMA 7)
- State of War (ABC 5)

=== Best Magazine Show ===
- 100% Pinoy! (GMA 7)
- Kapuso Mo, Jessica Soho (GMA 7)
- Mel & Joey (GMA 7)
- Probe (ABS-CBN 2)
- **Rated K (ABS-CBN 2)**

=== Best Magazine Show Host ===
- Pia Arcangel, Ivan Mayrina, Maki Pulido, Rhea Santos and Raffy Tima (100% Pinoy! / GMA 7)
- Joey de Leon and Mel Tiangco (Mel & Joey / GMA 7)
- Cheche Lazaro (Probe / ABS-CBN 2)
- **Korina Sanchez (Rated K / ABS-CBN 2)**
- Jessica Soho (Kapuso Mo, Jessica Soho / GMA 7)

=== Best News Program ===
- 24 Oras (GMA 7)
- **Bandila (ABS-CBN 2)**
- Big News (ABC 5)
- News on Q (QTV 11)
- Newswatch Aksyon Balita (RPN 9)
- Saksi (GMA 7)
- Teledyaryo (NBN 4)
- TV Patrol World (ABS-CBN 2)

=== Best Male Newscaster ===
- Martin Andanar (Sentro / ABC 5)
- Ali Atienza (IBC Express Balita / IBC 13)
- **Julius Babao (TV Patrol World / ABS-CBN 2)**
- Aljo Bendijo (Newswatch: Aksyon Balita / RPN 9)
- Arnold Clavio (Saksi / GMA 7)
- Mike Enriquez (24 Oras / GMA 7)
- Ted Failon (TV Patrol World / ABS-CBN 2)
- Ivan Mayrina (News on Q / Q 11)
- Buddy Oberas (Teledyaryo / NBN 4)
- Henry Omaga-Diaz (Bandila / ABS-CBN 2)
- **Alex Santos (TV Patrol Sabado/Linggo / ABS-CBN 2)**

=== Best Female Newscaster ===
- Karen Davila (TV Patrol World / ABS-CBN 2)
- Ces Drilon (Bandila / ABS-CBN 2)
- Precious Hipolito (IBC Express Balita / IBC 13)
- Cherie Mercado (Big News / ABC 5)
- Vicky Morales (Saksi / GMA 7)
- Kathy San Gabriel (Teledyaryo / NBN 4)
- Korina Sanchez (Bandila / ABS-CBN 2)
- Rhea Santos (News on Q / QTV 11)
- Bernadette Sembrano (TV Patrol Sabado/Linggo / ABS-CBN 2)
- **Mel Tiangco (24 Oras / GMA 7)**

=== Best Morning Show ===
- Breakfast (Studio 23)
- **Magandang Umaga, Pilipinas (ABS-CBN 2)**
- The Morning Show (NBN 4)
- Pilipinas, Gising Ka Na Ba? (UNTV 37)
- Unang Hirit (GMA 7)

=== Best Morning Show Host ===
- Pete Ampoloquio, Joy Delorei, Peter Ledesma, Atty. Batas Mauricio, Ryan Ramos, Daniel Razon, Jay Sonza, Nene Tamayo and Marylaine Viernes (Pilipinas, Gising Ka Na Ba? / UNTV 37)
- Atom Araullo, JC Cuadrado and Patty Laurel (Breakfast / Studio 23)
- **Kim Atienza, Julius Babao, Christine Bersolap, Winnie Cordero, Cheryl Cosim, Ogie Diaz, Renee Salud, Bernadette Sembrano and Lui Villaruz (Magandang Umaga, Pilipinas / ABS-CBN 2)**
- Snow Badua, Veronica Baluyot-Jimenez, Stefanie Cueva, Bobby Guanzona and William Thio (The Morning Show / NBN 4)
- Drew Arellano, Lyn Ching, Arnold Clavio, Susie Entrata-Abrera, Jolina Magdangal, Eagle Riggs, Lhar Santiago and Regine Tolentino (Unang Hirit / GMA 7)

=== Best Public Affairs Program ===
- Palaban (GMA 7)
- **Up Close and Personal (IBC 13)**
- Y Speak (Studio 23)

=== Best Public Affairs Program Host ===
- Kim Atienza, Bianca Gonzalez and Sam Concepcion (Y Speak / Studio 23)
- **Marissa del Mar (Up Close and Personal / IBC 13)**
- Malou Mangahas, Winnie Monsod and Miriam Quiambao (Palaban / GMA 7)

=== Best Showbiz Oriented Talk Show ===
- **The Buzz (ABS-CBN 2)**
- The Ricky Lo Exclusives (Q 11)
- S-Files (GMA 7)
- Showbiz Ka! (RPN 9)
- Startalk (GMA 7)

=== Best Male Showbiz Oriented Talk Show Host ===
- **Boy Abunda (The Buzz / ABS-CBN 2)**
- Paolo Bediones (S-Files / GMA 7)
- Joey de Leon (Startalk / GMA 7)
- John Lapus (S-Files / GMA 7)
- Ricky Lo (The Ricky Lo Exclusives / Q 11)

=== Best Female Showbiz Oriented Talk Show Host ===
- Kris Aquino (The Buzz / ABS-CBN 2)
- Pat-P Daza (Showbiz Ka! / RPN 9)
- **Cristy Fermin (The Buzz / ABS-CBN 2)**
- Pia Guanio (S-Files / GMA 7)
- Lorna Tolentino (Startalk / GMA 7)

=== Best Children Show ===
- **Art Angel (GMA 7)**
- Kids on Q (Q 11)
- Sineskwela (Studio 23)

=== Best Children Show Host ===
- **Pia Arcangel, Tonipet Gaba, and Krystal Reyes (Art Angel / GMA 7)**
- Tonipet Gaba, Ella Guevarra, Eugene Herrera and David Hubalde (Kids on Q / Q 11)
- Tado Jimenez, Shiela May Junsay and Bombi Plata (Sineskwela / Studio 23)

=== Best Travel Show ===
- Balikbayan (Q 11)
- Pinoy Meets World (GMA 7)
- **Trip na Trip (ABS-CBN 2)**
- Travel Time (Studio 23)
- WOW: What’s On Weekend (RPN 9)

=== Best Travel Show Host ===
- Drew Arellano (Balikbayan / Q 11)
- **Paolo Bediones and Miriam Quiambao (Pinoy Meets World / GMA 7)**
- Susan Calo-Medina and Lui Villaruz (Travel Time / Studio 23)
- Katherine de Castro, Jayson Gainza, Franzen Fajardo and Uma Khouny (Trip na Trip / ABS-CBN 2)
- Luane Dy and Joel Mendez (WOW: What’s On Weekend / RPN 9)

=== Best Lifestyle Show ===
- **At Home Ka Dito (ABS-CBN 2)**
- The Good Life with Cory Quirino (Studio 23)
- Kay Susan Tayo! (GMA 7)
- Living It Up (Q 11)
- Us Girls (Studio 23)

=== Best Lifestyle Show Host ===
- Angel Aquino, Cheska Garcia and Iya Villania (Us Girls / Studio 23)
- Cristina, Marilen Faustino, RJ Ledesma and Gelo Manosa (Tahanang Pinoy / ABC 5)
- Susan Enriquez (Kay Susan Tayo! / GMA 7)
- Charlene Gonzales (At Home Ka Dito / ABS-CBN 2)
- **Gaby dela Merced, Raymond Gutierrez, Issa Litton and Tim Yap (Living It Up / Q 11)**

== Special awards ==
=== Ading Fernando Lifetime Achievement Awardee ===
- Charo Santos-Concio

=== Excellence in Broadcasting Awardee ===
- Dong Puno (Male)
- Mel Tiangco (Female)

=== Faces of the Night ===
- John Lloyd Cruz (Male)
- Bea Alonzo (Female)

=== Stars of the Night ===
- Dingdong Dantes (Male)
- Lorna Tolentino (Female)

== See also ==
- PMPC Star Awards for TV
