= Eunice Lagusad =

Filipino actress and vlogger

- Born: Eunice Michaella Lagusad; May 18, 1998 (age 28); Manila, Philippines
- Other name: Charming
- Occupation: Actress
- Years active: 2002–present
- Agent: Freelancer

Eunice Michaella Lagusad (Tagalog: [juˈnɪs lɐˈgʊsad]; born May 18, 1998) is a Filipino actress and vlogger. She is popularly known as Charming in the hit TV drama series Bakekang and Princess Charming. She is currently a freelance actress but is mostly seen in GMA Network.

== Education ==
Lagusad studied high school at St. James Academy Malabon. She stopped studies until 9th grade. She finished high school through the Alternative Learning System of the Department of Education at Marilao Central Integrated School in 2025.

== Career ==
Lagusad was 8 years old when she became famous for her role as young Charming in GMA-7's Bakekang (2006), starring Sunshine Dizon. She played the daughter of Ogie Alcasid in the QTV 11 sitcom Ay, Robot! with Sam Bumatay. She starred in Princess Charming (2007) with Krystal Reyes as Charming Santos.

She also appeared in ABS-CBN's TV adaptation of Princess Sarah (2007), starring Sharlene San Pedro; Goin' Bulilit and Aryana, starring Ella Cruz.

In 2019, she appeared in the cast of GMA-7's hit drama series, Prima Donnas (2019–2022), and played the role of Juday/Judilita, alongside the co-stars with Jillian Ward, Althea Ablan, and Sofia Pablo.

In 2022, she joined the cast of the medical drama series Abot-Kamay na Pangarap (2022), and played the recurring role of Karen Elise G. Caudal, one of the staff nurses of APEX Medical Hospital, alongside the co-stars with Jillian Ward who are they reunited in Prima Donnas and Daldalita.

== Filmography ==
=== Film ===
Year	Title	Role	Notes
2007	Enteng Kabisote 4: Okay Ka, Fairy Ko... The Beginning of the Legend	Dingdong	
2007	Angels	Gelay	
2009	Cinemalaya: Ang Nerseri	Jenny	Indie film
2014	M: Mother's Maiden Name	Cameo	Indie film
2019	Black Lipstick	Arlene	
2023	Kampon	Ruth	

=== Television ===
Year	Title	Role
2002–2003	Kay Tagal Kang Hinintay	Alyssa
2003–2004	Basta't Kasama Kita	Merlie
2004–2006	Kids TV	Herself
2004	Mulawin	Young Biba
2005–2006	Mga Anghel na Walang Langit	Anet
2006	Bakekang	Young Charming
2006	Maalaala Mo Kaya: Juice	Perla
2006–2007	Ay, Robot!	Roda
2007	Princess Charming	Charming Santos
2007	Boys Nxt Door	Nikki
2007	Goin' Bulilit	Herself
2007	Princess Sarah	Becky
2010	Sine Novela: Ina, Kasusuklaman Ba Kita?	Nova
2010	Sine Novela: Basahang Ginto	Gilay Dimarucot
2010–2011	Inday Wanda	Jovic
2011	Alakdana	Weng
2011	Sinner or Saint	Chona
2011–2012	Daldalita	Tessa
2012–2013	Aryana	Elizabeth "Bebeth" Teves
2013	Indio	Upeng
2014	Tunay na Buhay	Herself
2014	Maalaala Mo Kaya: Marriage Contract	Jenny
2014	Wagas: Narcisa & Anaceto Love Story	Corazon
2014	Maalaala Mo Kaya: Panyo	Esmeralda
2014	Seasons of Love: My Soulmate, My Soulhate	Noy
2014	Wattpad Presents : Diary ng Hindi Malandi (Slight Lang!)	Mimay
2014	Wansapantaym: Wish Upon A Lusis	Candy
2015	Once Upon a Kiss	Melody
2015	#ParangNormal Activity	Deb
2015	Maynila: Flowers 4 U	Guest
2015	Magpakailanman: Katawan ko, Bayaran mo	Eliza
2015–2016	Because of You	Iska
2016	Dear Uge: Machong Make-up Artist	Wendy
2016	Oh, My Mama!	Sara Bartolome
2016	Karelasyon: Sapi	Laura
2017	Pinulot Ka Lang sa Lupa	Elma
2017	Maynila: My Goodbye Girl	Glennie
2017	Wagas: Julio & Kat Love Story	Dan/Danielle
2017	Dear Uge: Yaya's In Love	Charity/Bilog
2017–2018	Ika-6 na Utos	Becca
2018	Magpakailanman: Tinimbang ka Ngunit Sobra	Cha
2018	Daig Kayo ng Lola Ko	Inang Fairy
2018	Pepito Manaloto	Blue
2018	Tadhana: Tukso	Zyra
2018	Daig Kayo ng Lola Ko: Okay Ka, Genie Ko	Beauty
2018–2019	Onanay	Kiana
2019	Magpakailanman: Mula Zamboanga, Hanggang Sementeryo	Young Ethel
2019	Daig Kayo ng Lola Ko: My Vampire Love	Sheena
2019	Dear Uge: Raket Hero	Mylene
2019	One of the Baes	Gigi
2019–2022	Prima Donnas	Judelita "Juday" Valdez
2020	Wagas: Tarantula Sa'yo	Susana
2021	Tunay na Buhay	Herself
2022–2024	Abot-Kamay na Pangarap	Karen Elise G. Caudal
2025	My Ilonggo Girl	Ningning
2025	Akusada	Jennylyn
