= Khryss Adalia =

Filipino film, television, and stage director, writer, and actor

- Born: Christopher Raymond Endrina Adalia; October 2, 1946; Zamboanga, Philippines
- Died: October 13, 2008 (aged 62); Manila, Philippines
- Occupations: Film, television, and stage director, writer, and actor

Khryss Adalia (October 2, 1946 – October 13, 2008) was a Filipino film, television, and stage director, writer, and actor.

== Career ==
Khryss Adalia started in the entertainment industry as a scriptwriter for the 1982 movie Diosa and as a dubbing supervisor for the 1984 cult film Bagets. He did directing and acting in several movies. His last movie appearance was My Monster Mom, which starred Annabelle Rama and Ruffa Gutierrez. In addition, Adalia and his co-director Jerry Lopez Sineneng were both directed in FLAMES: The Movie.

Adalia directed several primetime and non-primetime shows on the GMA Network including Te Amo, Maging Sino Ka Man, Love to Love, Carlo J. Caparas' Bakekang, Mga Mata ni Anghelita, and Ako si Kim Samsoon.

== Cancer and death ==
Adalia was diagnosed with colorectal cancer on August 20, 2008 together with a pulmonary infection. On October 11, 2008, Adalia was rushed to the University of Santo Tomas Hospital because of his condition. He died two days later on the morning of October 13 at 7:30 a.m., 11 days after his birthday. His wake was held at the Funeraria Paz on G. Araneta Avenue in Quezon City and his remains were cremated there on October 18.

== Filmography ==
=== Television (Acting) ===
- Sic O'Clock News (IBC 13, 1988–1990)
