= Mga Mata ni Anghelita =

2007 Philippine television drama series

- Title card
- Also known as: Anghelita
- Genre: Fantasy drama
- Created by: Ricardo Feliciano
- Based on: Mga Mata ni Anghelita (1978) by Lauro Pacheco
- Written by: Adrian Ho; Abi Lam; Vien Ello; Benedict Migue
- Directed by: Gil Tejada Jr.; Khryss Adalia
- Creative director: Jun Lana
- Starring: Krystal Reyes
- Theme music composer: Tata Betita
- Opening theme: "Nang Dahil sa Iyo" by Maricris Garcia
- Country of origin: Philippines
- Original language: Tagalog
- No. of episodes: 70

Production
- Executive producers: Wilma Galvante; Mona Coles-Mayuga
- Production location: Pampanga
- Camera setup: Multiple-camera setup
- Running time: 18–34 minutes
- Production company: GMA Entertainment TV

Original release
- Network: GMA Network
- Release: July 2 – October 5, 2007

Mga Mata ni Anghelita (transl. eyes of Anghelita / international title: Anghelita) is a 2007 Philippine television drama fantasy series broadcast by GMA Network. The series is an adaptation of a 1978 film of the same title. Directed by Gil Tejada Jr. and Khryss Adalia, it stars Krystal Reyes. It premiered on July 2, 2007, on the network's Telebabad line up. The series concluded on October 5, 2007, with a total of 70 episodes.

The series is streaming online on YouTube.

== Cast and characters ==
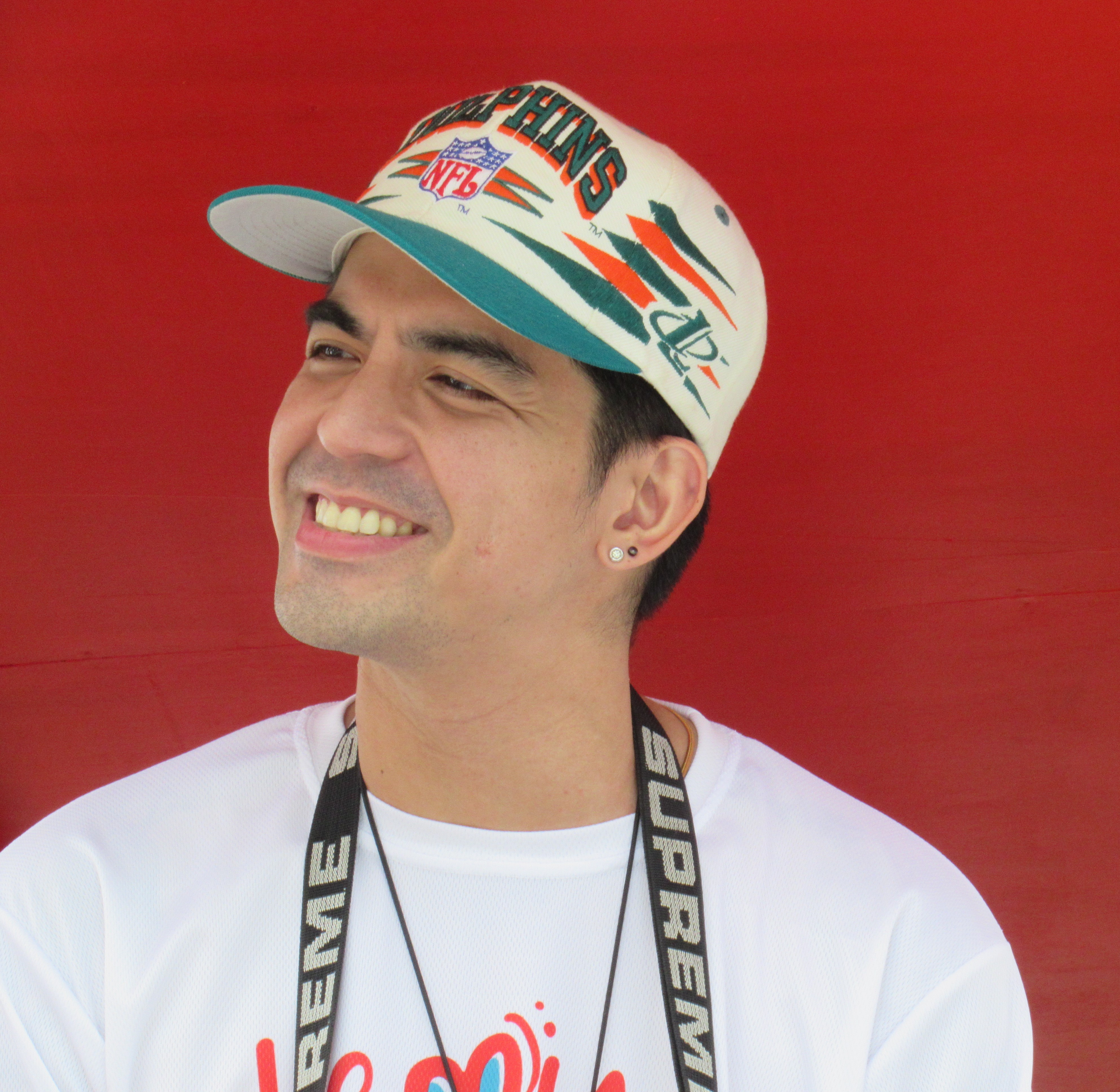
Mark Herras portrays Abel.

Lead cast

- Krystal Reyes as Anghelita

Supporting cast

- Sheryl Cruz as Magdalena
- Marvin Agustin as Gabriel / Angelo / Kuba
- Tonton Gutierrez as Carlos / Solcar
- Paolo Contis as Martin
- Carmina Villarroel as Cristina Manresa
- Celia Rodriguez as Leticia Manresa / Rasfelina / Corazon
- Mark Herras as Abel
- Isabel Oli as Teresa

Recurring cast

- Pen Medina as Joseph
- Daniel Fernando as Isaac
- Jess Lapid Jr. as Alba
- Ryan Yllana as Bitong
- Robert Ortega as Luis
- Tuesday Vargas as Selya
- Alynna Asistio as Lisa
- Martin Delos Santos as Iboy
- Louise Joy Folloso as Adriana
- Lucy Torres as Birheng Maria

Guest cast

- Beth Tamayo as Linda
- Allan Paule as Marcelo
- Yayo Aguila as Beth
- Eula Valdez as Bernice
- Alicia Mayer as Delilah
- Isabella De Leon as Rhoda
- Jewel Mische as Madel
- Prince Stefan as Gener
- Renz Juan as Ivy
- Arnell Ignacio as a manager / Madam
- Ian Veneracion as Tiklawin / Mercus
- Francis Magundayao as Niknok
- Miguel Vera
- John Feir

== Production ==
Principal photography commenced on June 16, 2007. Filming took place in Pampanga. Filming concluded on September 30, 2007.

== Critical response ==
Butch Francisco of The Philippine Star complimented the series' casting, narrative storytelling, pacing and the setting. Francisco also stated that the television adaptation is "better" than its source material.
