= Ryan Ramos =

Filipino actor, TV host and sportscaster (born 1996)

- Born: Ryan Ramos; November 5, 1996 (age 29); Davao City, Philippines
- Occupation: Actor
- Years active: 2001-present

Ryan Ramos is a Filipino actor, TV host and sportscaster. Ramos is currently the host of Sports 37, UNTV's sports magazine program and main host of UNTV Cup.

== Filmography ==
=== Television ===
Year	Title	Role	Notes	Source
2002–2003	Kung Mawawala Ka	Jonathan Quirino		
2005	Yes, Yes Show!	Multiple roles		
2005	Ikaw ang Lahat sa Akin	River		
2006	Star Magic Presents: Miss... Mistress	Alex		
2006	Komiks Presents: Kamay ni Hilda			
2005-07	Pilipinas, Gising Ka Na Ba?	Himself — Host	Nominated – PMPC Star Awards for Television for Best Morning Show Host {with Pete Ampoloquio, Joy Delorei, Peter Ledesma, Batas Mauricio, Daniel Razon, Jay Sonza, Nene Tamayo and Marylaine Viernes)	
2007	Maalaala Mo Kaya	Mio's friend	Episode: "Barko"	
2007–16	Sports 37	Himself — Host	Nominated – Anak TV Seal Awards (2009); Awardee – Anak TV Seal Awards (2010, 2011); Nominated – KBP Golden Dove Award for Best TV Sports Program (2011); Nominated – Golden Screen TV Awards for Outstanding Educational Program and Outstanding Educational Program Host (2011)	
2007-09	Good Morning Kuya	Himself — Host	Nominated – PMPC Star Awards for Television for Best Morning Show Host (2008. 2009) (with Tony Arevalo, Chris dela Cruz, Allan Encarnacion, Aida Gonzales, Janice Gotardo, Rene Jose, Lola Sela, Krist Melecio, Sahlee Piamonte, and Daniel Razon) (with Tony Arevalo, Allan Encarnacion, Aida Gonzales, Rene Jose, and Daniel Razon)	
2008	Maalaala Mo Kaya		Episode: "Pedicab"	
2009	May Bukas Pa	Winston	Special Guest	
2009	Maalaala Mo Kaya	Nadz's son	Episode: "Tattoo"	
2010	Maalaala Mo Kaya	Pedro	Episode: "Kalapati"	
2010	Rubi	Tony		
2010	Maalaala Mo Kaya	Ramon	Episode: "Kwintas"	
2012	Maalaala Mo Kaya	Franz	Episode: "Stuffed Toy"	
2015	Maalaala Mo Kaya		Episode: "Manika"	

=== Film ===
Year	Title	Role	Notes	Source
2001	Oras Na Para Lumaban			
2009	Isang Araw Lang		Daniel Razon's directorial debut, also writer	
2013	Isang Araw			

== Awards and nominations ==
Year	Work	Award	Category	Result	Source
2001	Oras Na Para Lumaban	PMPC Star Awards for Movies	Best New Movie Actor	Nominated	
2007	Pilipinas, Gising Ka Na Ba?	PMPC Star Awards for Television	Best Morning Show Host	Nominated	
2008	Good Morning Kuya	PMPC Star Awards for Television	Best Morning Show Host	Nominated	
2009	Good Morning Kuya	PMPC Star Awards for Television	Best Morning Show Host	Nominated	
2011	Sports 37	Golden Screen TV Awards	Outstanding Educational Program Host	Nominated	
