= Sabadabadog! =

2011 Philippine television infotainment show

- Title card
- Genre: Infotainment
- Presented by: Tonipet Gaba; Arkin Magalona
- Country of origin: Philippines
- Original language: Tagalog
- No. of episodes: 27

Production
- Camera setup: Multiple-camera setup
- Running time: 30 minutes
- Production company: GMA News and Public Affairs

Original release
- Network: GMA Network
- Release: May 21 – November 19, 2011

Sabadabadog! is a 2011 Philippine television infotainment children's show broadcast by GMA Network. Hosted by Tonipet Gaba and Arkin Magalona, it premiered on May 21, 2011. The show concluded on November 19, 2011, with a total of 27 episodes.

== Ratings ==
According to AGB Nielsen Philippines' Mega Manila household television ratings, the final episode of Sabadabadog! scored a 4.6% rating.

== Accolades ==
Accolades received by Tropang Potchi
Year	Award	Category	Recipient	Result	Ref.
2011	Golden Screen TV Awards	Outstanding Educational Program	Sabadabadog!	Nominated	
