= Art Angel =

Philippine television infotainment show

- Title card
- Genre: Infotainment
- Presented by: Pia Arcangel; Tonipet Gaba; Krystal Reyes; Roxanne Barcelo
- Opening theme: "Art Angel"
- Country of origin: Philippines
- Original language: Tagalog
- No. of episodes: 370

Production
- Camera setup: Multiple-camera setup
- Running time: 11–18 minutes
- Production companies: GMA News and Public Affairs; Philippine Children's Television Foundation, Inc.

Original release
- Network: GMA Network
- Release: April 17, 2004 – May 14, 2011

Art Angel is a Philippine television infotainment show broadcast by GMA Network. Originally hosted by Pia Arcangel, Tonipet Gaba and Krystal Reyes. It premiered on April 17, 2004. In 2010, Arcangel and Reyes left the show, and were replaced by Roxanne Barcelo on June 19, 2010. The show concluded on May 14, 2011, with a total of 370 episodes.

The show is streaming online on YouTube.

== Accolades ==
Accolades received by Art Angel
Year	Award	Category	Recipient	Result	Ref.
2007	Anak TV Seal Awards	Top 10's Most Well-Liked Programs for TV	Art Angel	Included	
2007	Los Angeles International TV & Film Festival	Silver Award	Art Angel	Won	
2007	21st PMPC Star Awards for Television	Best Children Show	Art Angel	Won	
2007	21st PMPC Star Awards for Television	Best Children Show Host	Pia Arcangel Tonipet Gaba Krystal Reyes	Won	
2008	Anak TV Seal Awards	Top 10's Most Well-Liked Programs for TV	Art Angel	Included	
2008	22nd PMPC Star Awards for Television	Best Children Show	Art Angel	Won	
2008	22nd PMPC Star Awards for Television	Best Children Show Host	Pia Arcangel Tonipet Gaba Krystal Reyes	Won	
2009	Anak TV Seal Awards	Most Well-Liked Programs	Art Angel	Included	
2009	Gawad Tanglaw	Best Educational Program	Art Angel	Won	
2009	23rd PMPC Star Awards for Television	Best Children Show	Art Angel	Won	
2009	23rd PMPC Star Awards for Television	Best Children Show Host	Pia Arcangel Tonipet Gaba Krystal Reyes	Won	
2010	24th PMPC Star Awards for Television	Best Children Show	Art Angel	Nominated	
2010	24th PMPC Star Awards for Television	Best Children Show Host	Pia Arcangel	Nominated	
2011	25th PMPC Star Awards for Television	Best Children Show	Art Angel	Won	
2011	25th PMPC Star Awards for Television	Best Children Show Host	Tonipet Gaba Roxanne Barcelo	Won	
