= Pinoy Meets World =

Philippine television documentary show

- Title card
- Genre: Travel documentary
- Presented by: Paolo Bediones; Miriam Quiambao
- Country of origin: Philippines
- Original language: Tagalog

Production
- Camera setup: Multiple-camera setup
- Running time: 60 minutes
- Production company: GMA News and Public Affairs

Original release
- Network: GMA Network
- Release: June 25, 2006 – January 25, 2009

Pinoy Meets World (transl. Filipino meets world) is a Philippine television travel documentary show broadcast by GMA Network. Hosted by Paolo Bediones and Miriam Quiambao, it premiered on June 25, 2006. The show concluded on January 25, 2009.

== Hosts ==
Hosts

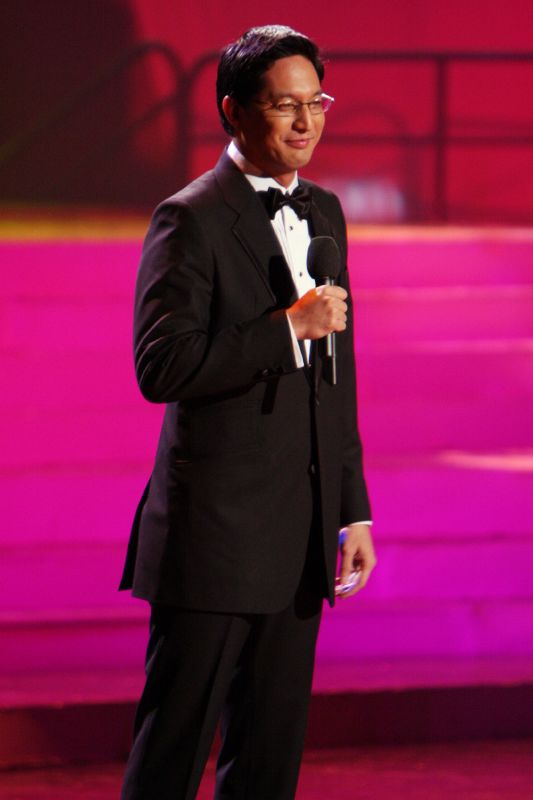
Paolo Bediones

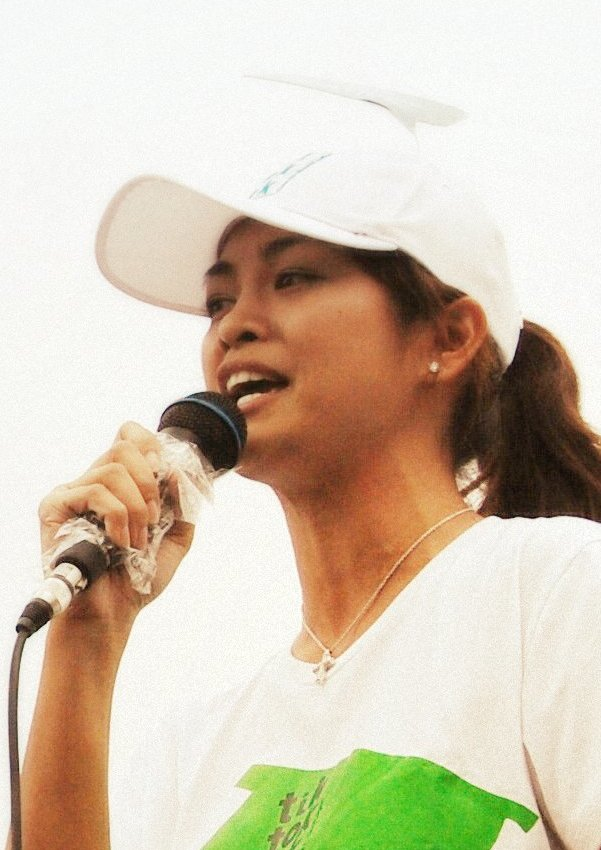
Miriam Quiambao

- Paolo Bediones
- Miriam Quiambao

== Episodes ==
Episodes of Pinoy Meets World
Ep.	Region	Host(s)	Original air date
South Korea	Asia	Miriam Quiambao and Paolo Bediones	June 25, 2006 July 2, 2006
India	Asia	Miriam Quiambao and Paolo Bediones	July 9, 2006 July 16, 2006
Germany	Europe	Miriam Quiambao and Paolo Bediones	July 23, 2006 July 30, 2006
Palau	Oceania	Miriam Quiambao and Paolo Bediones	August 6, 2006 August 13, 2006
Hong Kong	Asia	Miriam Quiambao and Paolo Bediones	August 20, 2006 August 27, 2006
Macau	Asia	Miriam Quiambao and Paolo Bediones	August 20, 2006 August 27, 2006
Turkey	Europe	Miriam Quiambao and Paolo Bediones	September 3, 2006 September 10, 2006
Recap episode			September 17, 2006
United Kingdom	Europe	Miriam Quiambao and Paolo Bediones	
Spain	Europe	Miriam Quiambao and Paolo Bediones	-
Finland	Europe	Miriam Quiambao and Paolo Bediones	-
United States	North America	Miriam Quiambao and Paolo Bediones	-
Romania	Europe	Miriam Quiambao and Paolo Bediones	-
Australia	Oceania	Miriam Quiambao and Paolo Bediones	-
Thailand	Asia	Miriam Quiambao and Paolo Bediones	September 24, 2006
Houston, Texas	America	TJ Manotoc	October 2006
Miami, Florida and Dallas, Texas	America	Vitto Lazatin	November 2006
Malaysia	Asia	Rhea Santos	February 2007
Las Vegas, Nevada	America	Vitto Lazatin and Jude Turcuato	March 4, 2007
Brunei	Asia	Rufa Mae Quinto	May 5, 2007
Turkey	Europe	Joyce Jimenez	June 24, 2007
San Antonio, Texas and Cleveland, Ohio	America	Chino Trinidad	July 8, 2007
Laos	Asia	Pekto and John Feir	July 29, 2007
Morocco	Africa	Angelica Jones and Alyssa Alano	August 26, 2007
Nepal	Asia	Ariel Villasanta and Maverick Relova	September 16, 2007
Switzerland	Europe	Suzi and Paolo Abrera	November 18, 2007
Kenya	Africa	Pia Arcangel and Tonipet Gaba	November 25, 2007
Spain	Europe	Howie Severino and Mariz Umali	December 23, 2007
Recap episode			January 27, 2008
Italy	Europe	Love Añover	February 24, 2008
United Kingdom	Europe	Susan Enriquez	March 30, 2008
Greece	Europe	Miriam Quiambao	May 4, 2008
Poland	Europe	Jiggy Manicad	June 8, 2008
Czech Republic	Europe	Jiggy Manicad	June 8, 2008
England	Europe	Drew Arellano	June 29, 2008
Boston, Massachusetts and Los Angeles, California	America	Chino Trinidad	July 13, 2008
Puerto Rico	Caribbean	Teresa Licaros	July 20, 2008
South Africa	Africa	Ferdz Recio	August 24, 2008
Antigua and Barbuda	Caribbean	Maki Pulido	October 6, 2008
Barbados	Caribbean	Maki Pulido	October 6, 2008
Dominica	Caribbean	Maki Pulido	October 6, 2008
Saint Kitts and Nevis	Caribbean	Maki Pulido	October 6, 2008
Saint Lucia	Caribbean	Maki Pulido	October 6, 2008
U.S. Virgin Islands	Caribbean	Maki Pulido	October 6, 2008
Mauritius	Africa	Kara David	November 2, 2008
Chile	South America	Raffy Tima	November 23, 2008
Peru	South America	Romi Garduce	December 7, 2008
The Best of Pinoy Meets World			January 25, 2009

== Accolades ==
Accolades received by Pinoy Meets World
Year	Award	Category	Recipient	Result	Ref.
2007	21st PMPC Star Awards for Television	Best Travel Show	Pinoy Meets World	Nominated	
2007	21st PMPC Star Awards for Television	Best Travel Show Hosts	Paolo Bediones Miriam Quiambao	Won	
2008	22nd PMPC Star Awards for Television	Best Travel Show	Pinoy Meets World	Won	
2008	22nd PMPC Star Awards for Television	Best Travel Show Hosts	GMA News & Public Affairs Team	Nominated	
