= La Vendetta (TV series) =

Philippine television drama series

- Title card
- Genre: Horror drama; Crime
- Created by: R.J. Nuevas
- Written by: R.J. Nuevas; Suzette Doctolero; Richard Cruz; Ma. Christina Velasco
- Directed by: Gil Tejada Jr.; Lore Reyes; Topel Lee
- Starring: Jennylyn Mercado; Sunshine Dizon; Jean Garcia
- Theme music composer: George Canseco
- Ending theme: "P.S. I Love You" by Jennylyn Mercado
- Country of origin: Philippines
- Original language: Tagalog
- No. of episodes: 60

Production
- Executive producer: Winnie Hollis-Reyes
- Editor: Eddie Esmedia
- Camera setup: Multiple-camera setup
- Running time: 20–36 minutes
- Production company: GMA Entertainment TV

Original release
- Network: GMA Network
- Release: October 29, 2007 – January 18, 2008

La Vendetta (transl. the vendetta) is a Philippine television drama horror crime series broadcast by GMA Network. Directed by Gil Tejada Jr. and Lore Reyes, it stars Jennylyn Mercado, Sunshine Dizon and Jean Garcia. It premiered on October 29, 2007 on the network's Telebabad line up. The series concluded on January 18, 2008, with a total of 60 episodes.

The series is streaming online on YouTube.

== Premise ==
The story focuses on sisters named Amanda, Eloisa and Almira. Amanda is the eldest whose mother dies early. Her father marries another woman with whom he has two more daughters. Sibling rivalry ensues between the sisters when they all vie for their father's attention. One night, Almira is killed, an incident that will eventually reveal the killer.

== Cast and characters ==
Cast

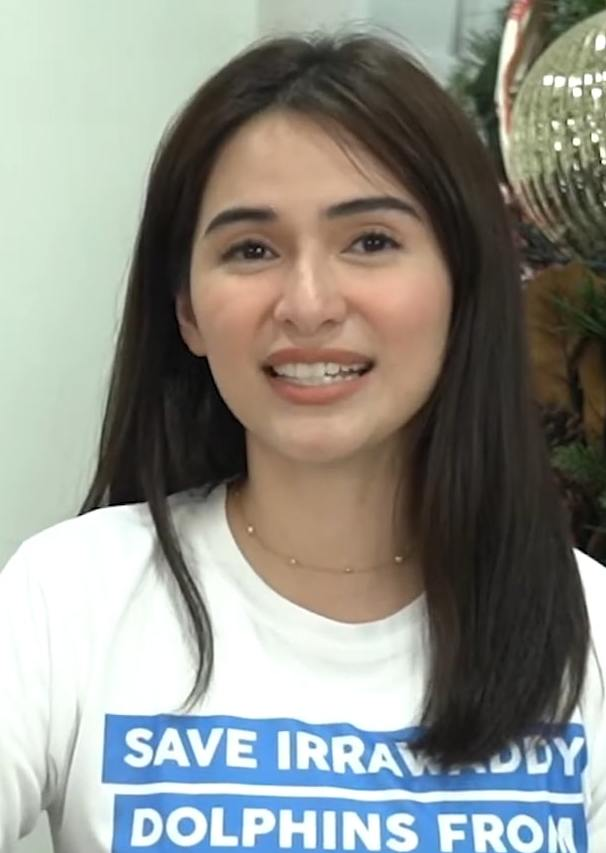
Jennylyn Mercado

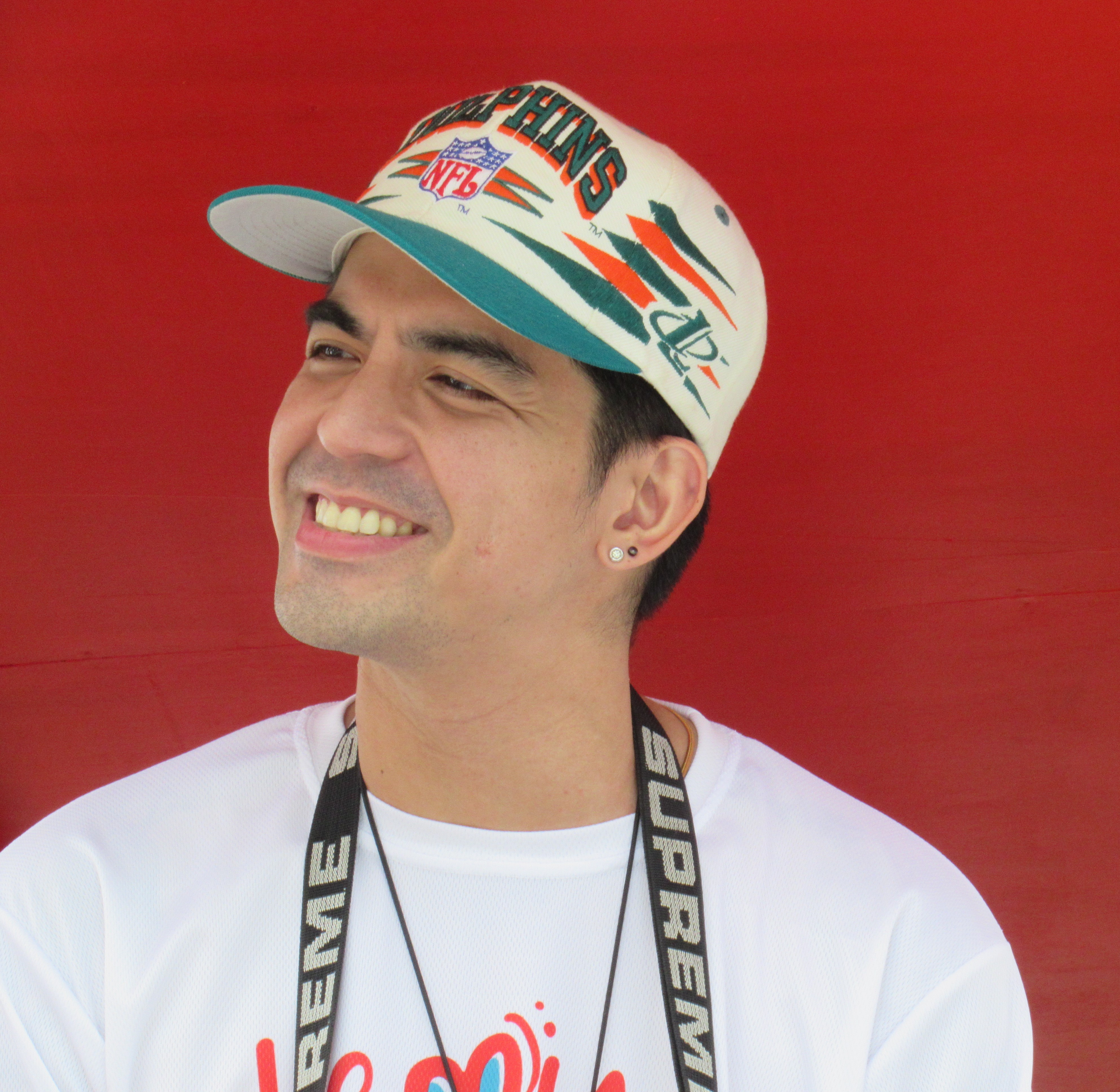
Mark Herras

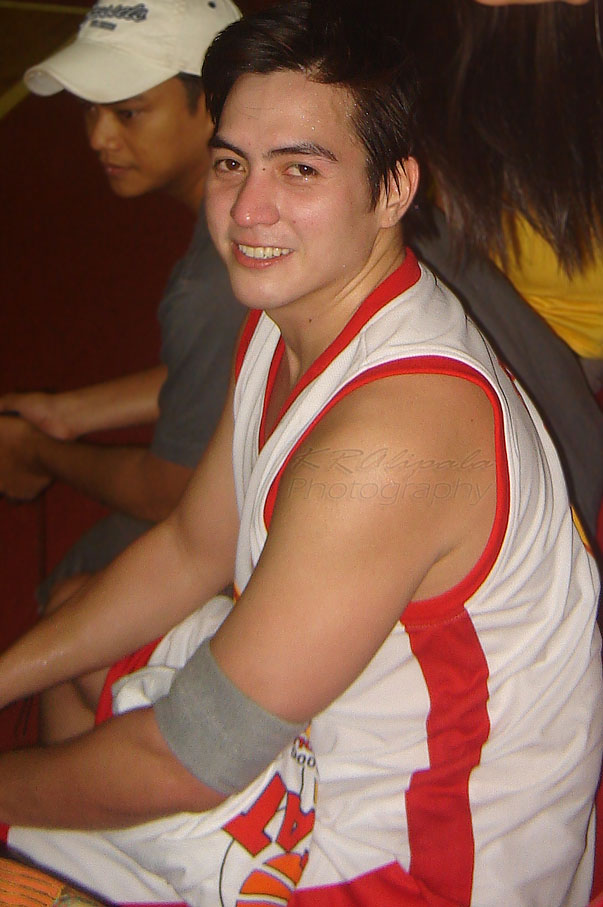
Wendell Ramos

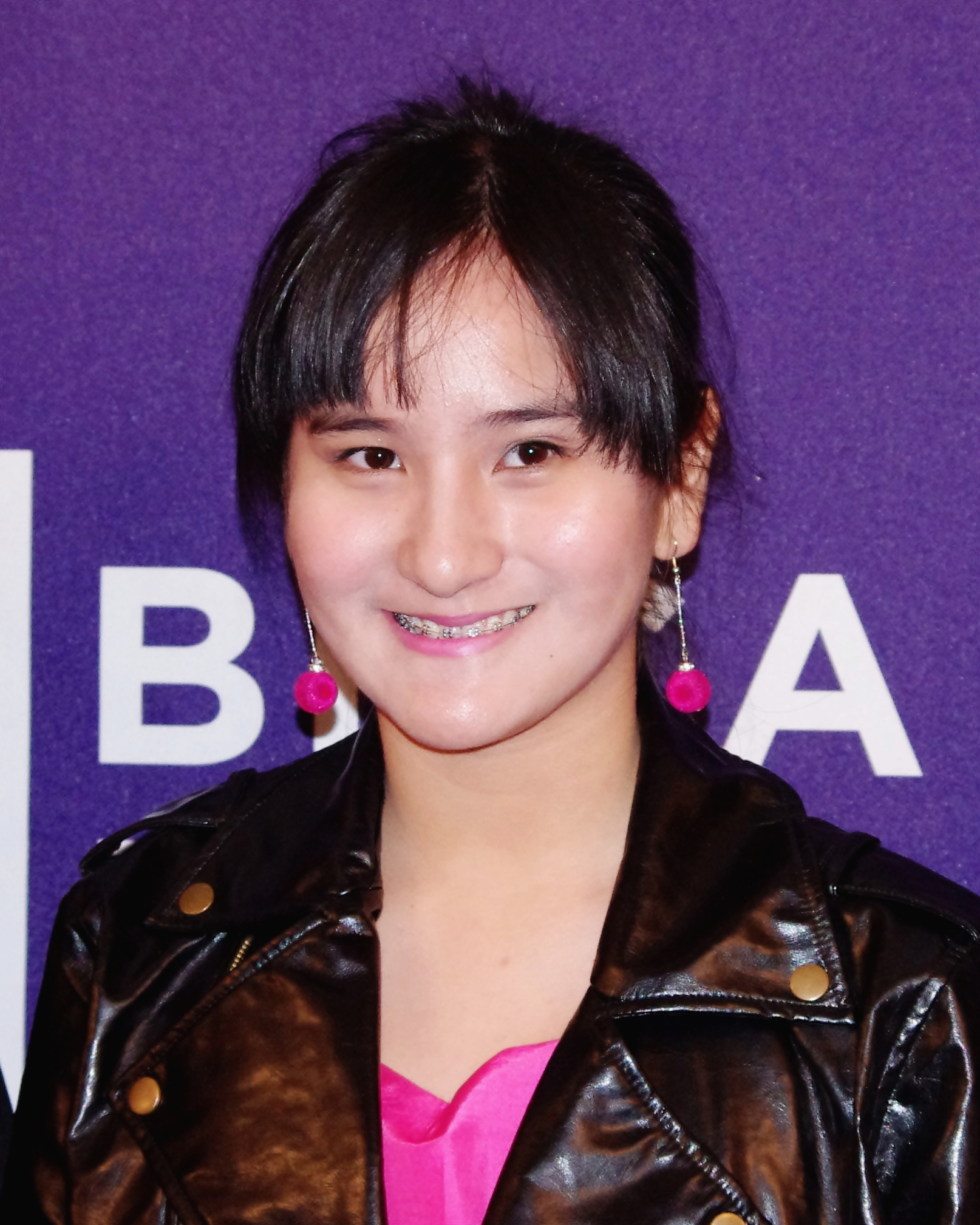
Ella Guevara

Lead cast

- Jennylyn Mercado as Almira Cardinale
- Sunshine Dizon as Eloisa Salumbides-Cardinale
- Jean Garcia as Amanda Cardinale

Supporting cast

- Paolo Contis as Junjun Sabino
- Mark Herras as Galo Alumpihit
- Polo Ravales as Gabby Trajano
- Luis Alandy as Ariel Guevarra
- Wendell Ramos as Rigo Bayani
- Chynna Ortaleza as Joanna Alumpihit
- Angelica Jones as Gerta Lamismis
- Ynna Asistio as Alex Cardinale
- Joseph Marco as Santi Domingo
- Rustom Padilla (now known as BB Gandanghari) as Alfie Camba
- Dante Rivero as Edwin Cardinale
- Caridad Sanchez as Nana Mildred
- Snooky Serna as Janet Salumbides
- Lotlot de Leon as Rodora Alhambra
- Ella Guevara as Jessie Cardinale

Guest cast

- Krystal Reyes as younger Eloisa
- Hazel Ann Mendoza as teenage Amanda
- Karen delos Reyes as Andrea
- Sheila Marie Rodriguez as Alona
- Jenny Miller as Mariel
- Miguel Tanfelix as younger Junjun
- Deborah Sun as Alice Bayani
- Maricel Morales as Rebecca
- Jen Rosendahl as Vicky
- Gene Padilla as Dodong
- Nicole Dulalia as younger Rodora
- Joy Folloso as younger Amanda
- Jelaine Santos as Gigi
- Cheska Iñigo as Jaydine

== Casting ==
Actress Sheryl Cruz was initially tapped to play Amanda. Actress Jean Garcia later served as her replacement.

== Production ==
Principal photography commenced on October 12, 2007.

== Ratings ==
According to AGB Nielsen Philippines' Mega Manila household television ratings, the pilot episode of La Vendetta earned a 28.7% rating. The final episode scored a 33.4% rating.

== Accolades ==
Accolades received by La Vendetta
Year	Award	Category	Recipient	Result	Ref.
2008	22nd PMPC Star Awards for Television	Best Primetime Drama Series	La Vendetta	Nominated	
