= My Only Love =

Philippine television drama series

- Title card
- Genre: Romantic drama
- Based on: My Only Love (1982) by Eddie Garcia
- Written by: Des Garbes Severino
- Directed by: Louie Ignacio
- Starring: Mark Herras; Rhian Ramos; Bianca King
- Ending theme: "My Only Love" by Kyla
- Country of origin: Philippines
- Original language: Tagalog
- No. of episodes: 79

Production
- Executive producer: Wilma Galvante
- Camera setup: Multiple-camera setup
- Running time: 25–35 minutes
- Production company: GMA Entertainment TV

Original release
- Network: GMA Network
- Release: November 12, 2007 – February 29, 2008

My Only Love is a Philippine television drama romance series broadcast by GMA Network. Based on a 1982 Philippine film of the same title, the series is the fifth instalment of Sine Novela. Directed by Louie Ignacio, it stars Mark Herras, Rhian Ramos and Bianca King. It premiered on November 12, 2007 on the network's Dramarama sa Hapon line up. The series concluded on February 29, 2008, with a total of 79 episodes.

== Cast and characters ==
Cast

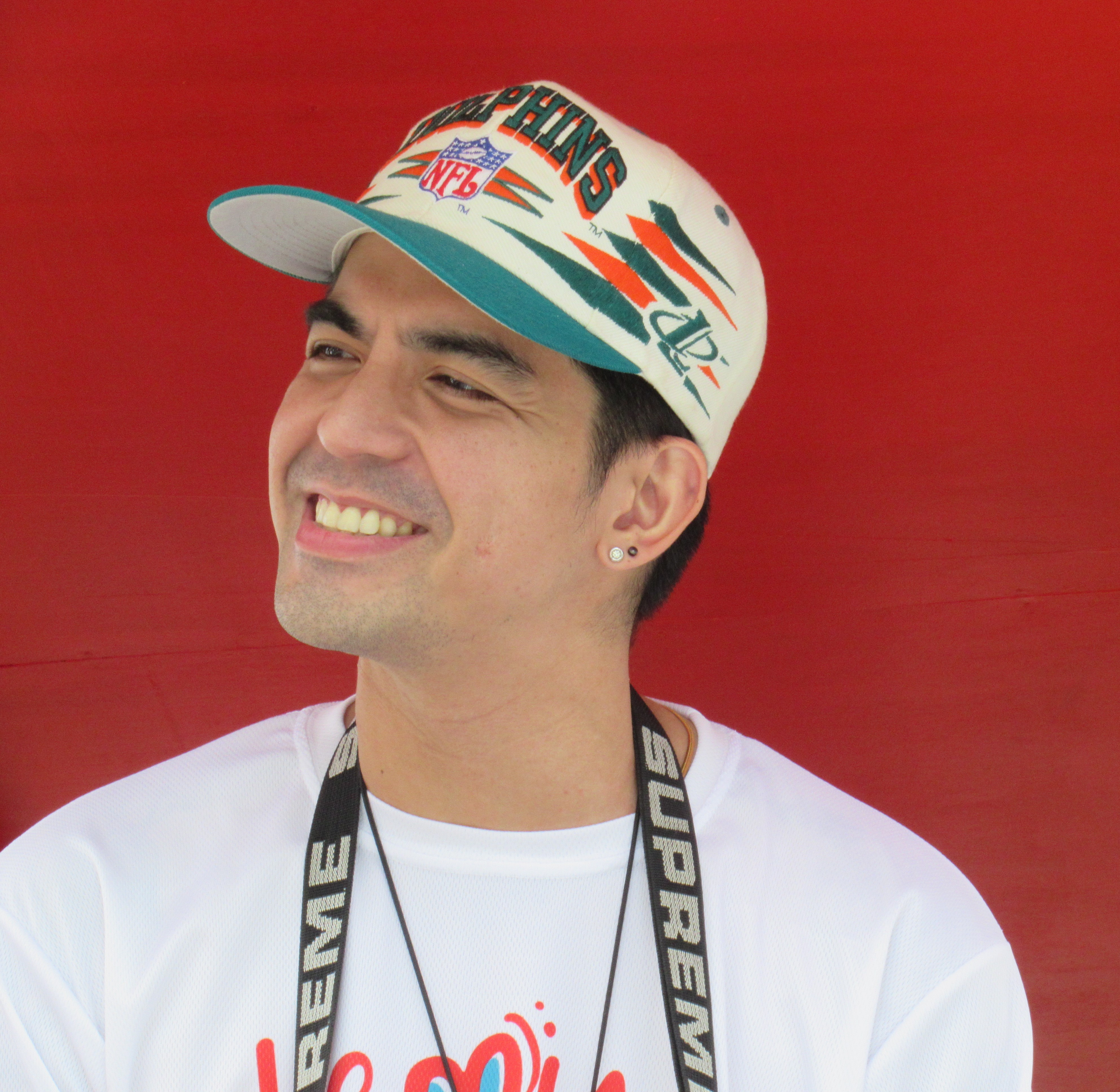
Mark Herras

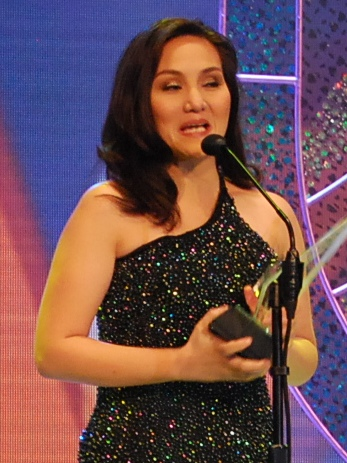
Gladys Reyes

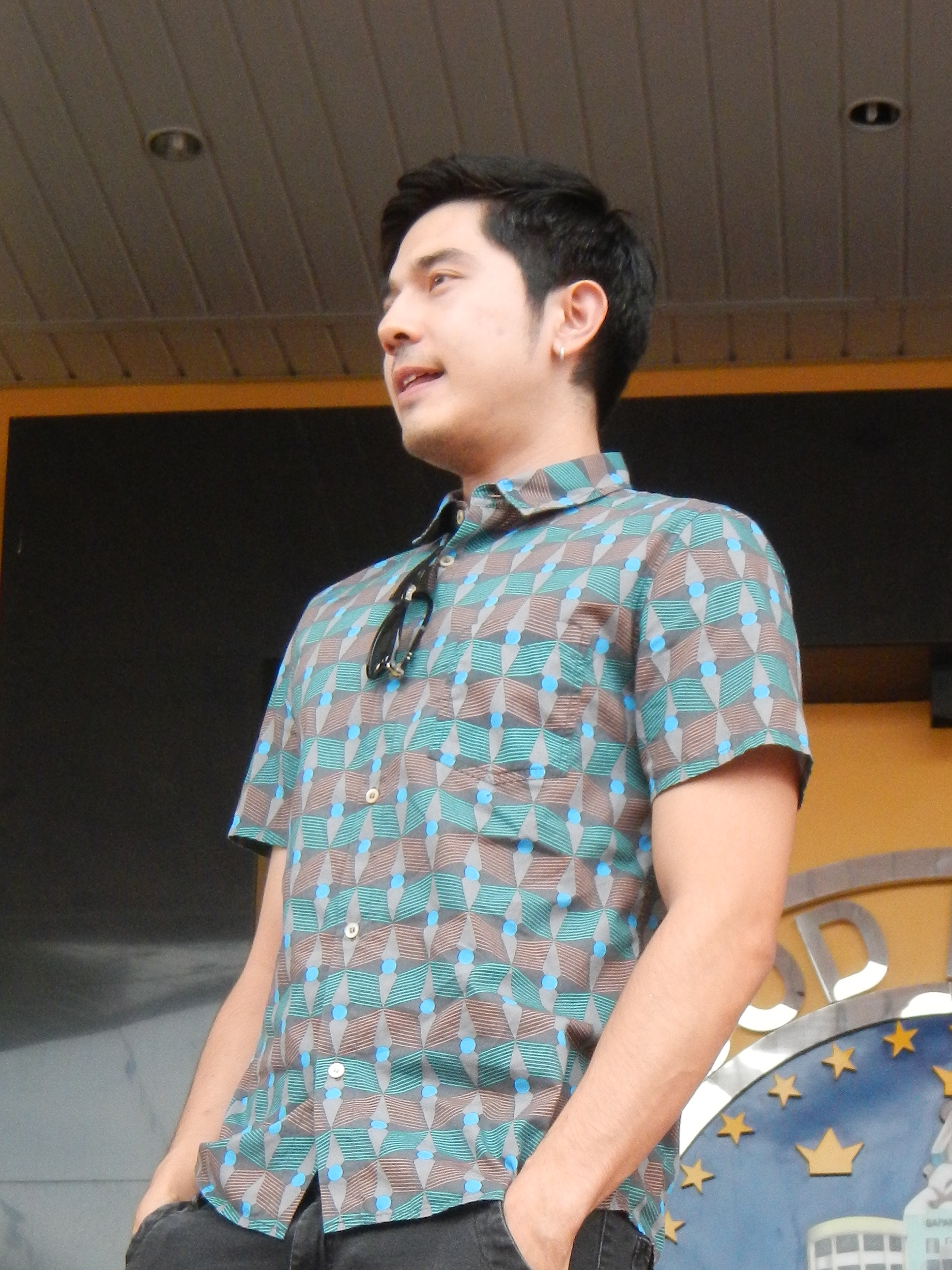
Paulo Avelino

Lead cast

- Rhian Ramos as Cindy Moreno
- Mark Herras as Billy Soriano
- Bianca King as Trixie

Supporting cast

- Alfred Vargas as Emman
- Rita Avila as Camille
- Sherilyn Reyes as Loren
- Gladys Reyes as Pearl
- Stef Prescott as Tiffany
- Ana Capri as Magda
- Daniel Fernando as Luisito
- Ruby Rodriguez as Tessie
- Tessbomb as Paris
- Kevin Santos as Paul
- Marco Alcaraz as Jonas
- Chariz Solomon as Marge
- Paulo Avelino as Alvin

Guest cast

- Lloyd Samartino as Ricardo
- Gail Lardizabal as Innah
- Krystal Reyes as younger Cindy
- Renz Valerio as younger Billy
- Ella Guevara as younger Trixie
- Joy Folloso as younger Tiffany

== Ratings ==
According to AGB Nielsen Philippines' Mega Manila household television ratings, the pilot episode of My Only Love earned a 19.8% rating. The final episode scored a 20.7% rating.

== Accolades ==
Accolades received by My Only Love
Year	Award	Category	Recipient	Result	Ref.
2008	22nd PMPC Star Awards for Television	Best Daytime Drama Series	My Only Love	Nominated	
