= Princess Charming (Philippine TV series) =

2007 Philippine television drama series

- Title card
- Genre: Drama
- Starring: Krystal Reyes; Eunice Lagusad
- Opening theme: "Princess Charming" by Rita Iringan
- Ending theme: Kyla
- Country of origin: Philippines
- Original language: Tagalog
- No. of episodes: 63

Production
- Executive producer: Joseph Buncalan
- Camera setup: Multiple-camera setup
- Running time: 16–29 minutes
- Production company: GMA Entertainment TV

Original release
- Network: GMA Network
- Release: January 29 – April 27, 2007

Princess Charming is a 2007 Philippine television drama series broadcast by GMA Network. Directed by Argel Joseph, it stars Krystal Reyes and Eunice Lagusad both in the title role. It premiered on January 29, 2007 on the network's Dramarama sa Hapon line up. The series concluded on April 27, 2007, with a total of 63 episodes.

The series is streaming online on YouTube.

== Premise ==
When Amparo consults a fortune teller about her business ventures, the fortune teller warns her that her ugly granddaughter would be her downfall. Amparo steals her infant granddaughter away from her parents and gives her to a woman. She then adopts a pretty baby girl from another woman and presents the baby to her son and daughter-in-law as their own daughter. The pretty child grows up as "Princess" and the ugly child grows up as "Charming".

== Cast and characters ==
Cast

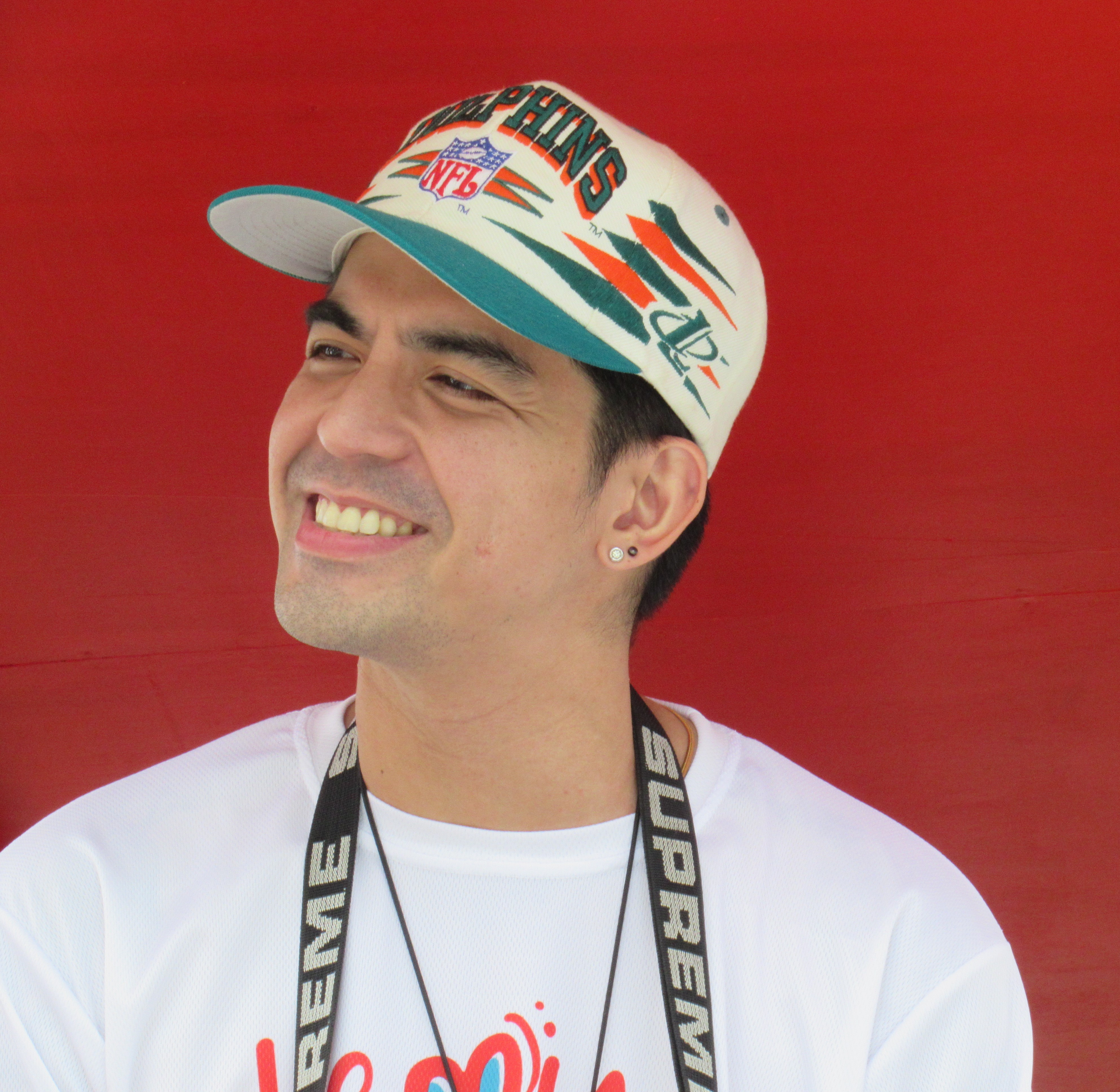
Mark Herras

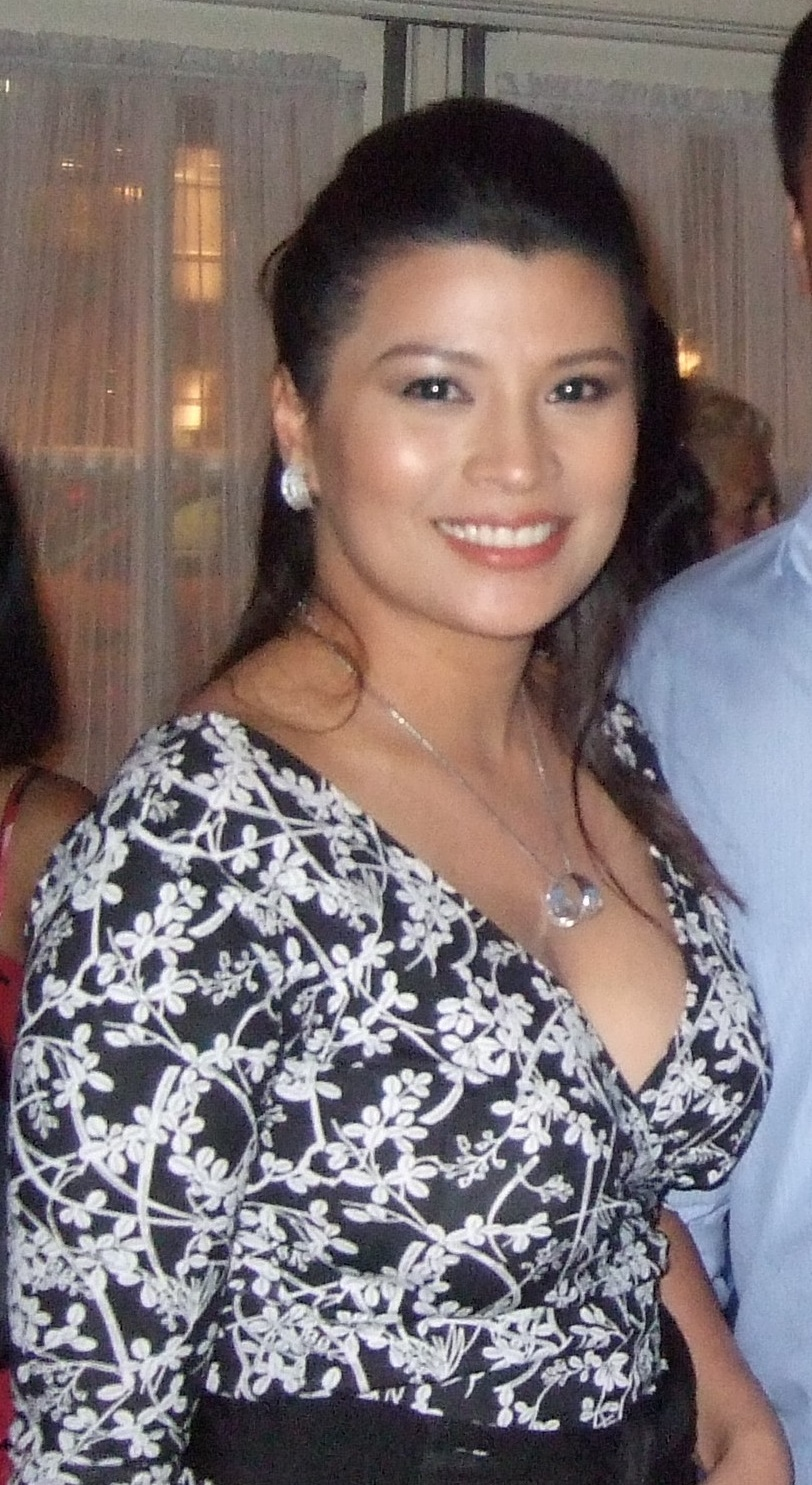
Mylene Dizon

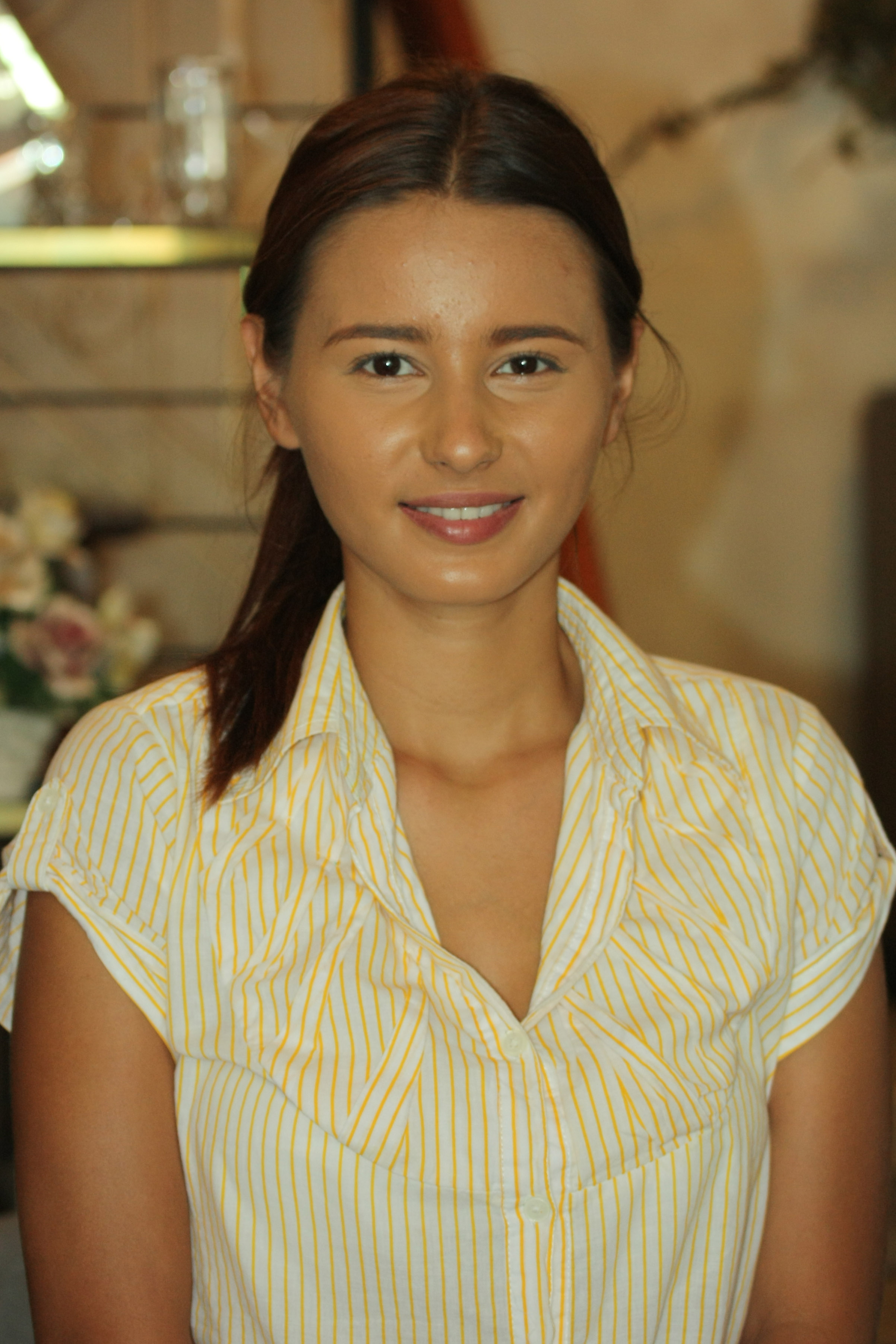
Jackie Rice

Lead cast

- Krystal Reyes as Princess de Saavedra
- Eunice Lagusad as Charming Santos

Supporting cast

- Mark Herras as Inoy Santos
- Mylene Dizon as Sofia Santos
- Carmina Villarroel as Mabel de Saavedra
- Zoren Legaspi as Enrico de Saavedra
- Chanda Romero as Amparo de Saavedra
- Jackie Rice as Bernadette de Saavedra
- Lotlot de Leon as Lizette
- Arci Muñoz as Pamela
- Jade Lopez as Aleli Santos
- Allan Paule as Ronald Santos
- Dexter Doria as Loreta
- Luz Fernandez as Melinda
- Mel Martinez as Sushmita
- Joy Folloso as Vanessa Santos
- Sweet Ramos as Libby Santos
- Tart Carlos as Doris
- Zamierre Benevice as Bambi
- Darius Razon as Teroy
- Gerard Pizarras as Dante
- Kier Legaspi as Ricardo de Saavedra

== Accolades ==
Accolades received by Princess Charming
Year	Award	Category	Recipient	Result	Ref.
2007	21st PMPC Star Awards for Television	Best Daytime Drama Series	Princess Charming	Nominated	
