= Sinasamba Kita =

2007 Philippine television drama series

- Title card
- Also known as: All for You
- Genre: Drama
- Created by: Gilda Olvidado
- Based on: Sinasamba Kita (1982) by Eddie Garcia
- Written by: Don Michael Perez; Anna Aleta A. Nadela
- Directed by: Joel Lamangan
- Creative director: Roy Iglesias
- Starring: Sheryl Cruz; Wendell Ramos; Valerie Concepcion; Carlo Aquino
- Theme music composer: George Canseco; Rey Valera
- Opening theme: Sheryl Cruz
- Ending theme: "Sinasamba Kita" by Ogie Alcasid
- Country of origin: Philippines
- Original language: Tagalog
- No. of episodes: 65

Production
- Executive producer: Wilma Galvante
- Camera setup: Multiple-camera setup
- Running time: 25–35 minutes
- Production company: GMA Entertainment TV

Original release
- Network: GMA Network
- Release: April 30 – July 27, 2007

Sinasamba Kita (transl. I am worshipping you / international title: All for You) is a 2007 Philippine television drama series broadcast by GMA Network. Based on a Philippine graphic novel written by Gilda Olvidado, the series is the first instalment of Sine Novela. Directed by Joel Lamangan, it stars Sheryl Cruz, Wendell Ramos, Valerie Concepcion and Carlo Aquino. It premiered on April 30, 2007 on the network's Dramarama sa Hapon line up. The series concluded on July 27, 2007, with a total of 65 episodes.

== Cast and characters ==
Cast

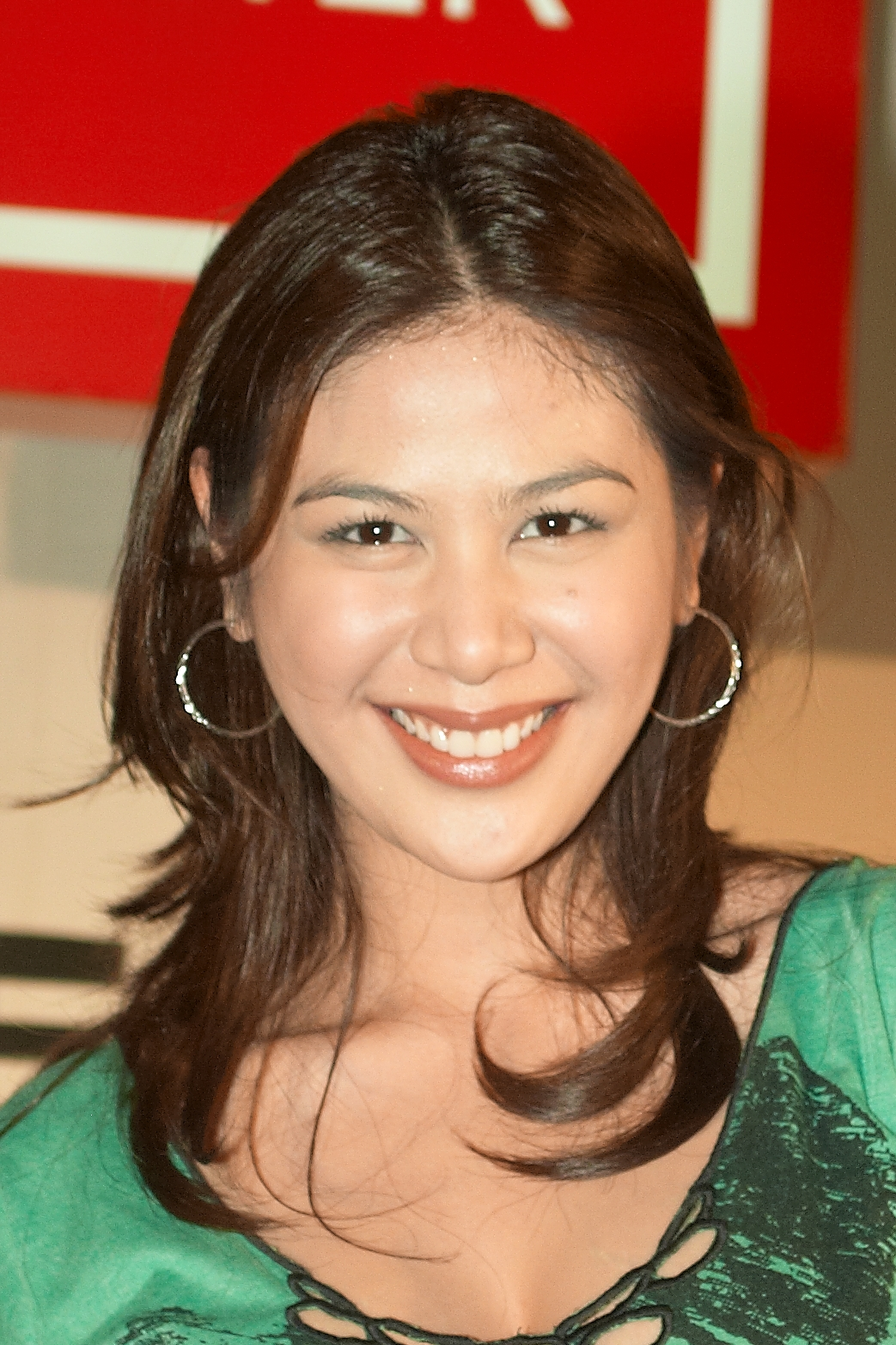
Valerie Concepcion

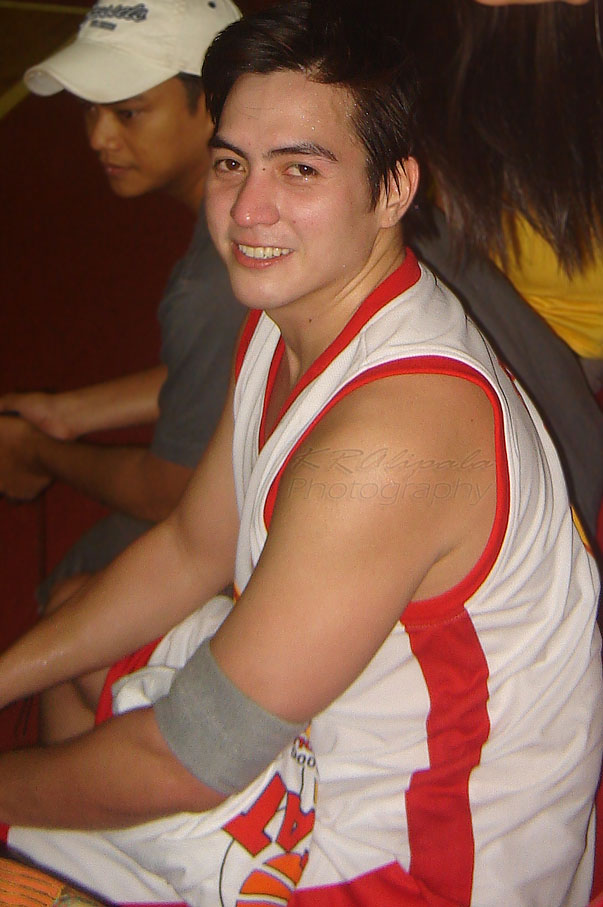
Wendell Ramos

Lead cast

- Sheryl Cruz as Divina Ferrer
- Valerie Concepcion as Nora Ferrer
- Carlo Aquino as Oscar
- Wendell Ramos as Jerry Sandoval

Supporting cast

- Gina Alajar as Corazon
- Mark Gil as José Ferrer
- Jackie Lou Blanco as Sylvia
- Allan Paule as Eddie
- Bing Loyzaga as Isabellita
- Ricardo Cepeda as Larry
- Raquel Villavicencio as Elvie
- Tony Mabesa as Manolo
- Jordan Herrera as Jacobo

Guest cast

- Ella Guevara as younger Divina

== Accolades ==
Accolades received by Sinasamba Kita
Year	Award	Category	Recipient	Result	Ref.
2007	21st PMPC Star Awards for Television	Best Daytime Drama Series	Sinasamba Kita	Won	
2007	21st PMPC Star Awards for Television	Best Drama Actor	Carlo Aquino	Nominated	
2007	21st PMPC Star Awards for Television	Best Drama Actress	Sheryl Cruz	Nominated	
