= Bakekang =

Philippine television drama series

- Title card
- Genre: Drama
- Based on: Bakekang by Carlo J. Caparas
- Developed by: R.J. Nuevas
- Written by: Suzette Doctolero; Denoy Narro-Punto; Renato Custodio; Tina Velasco; Dode Cruz
- Directed by: Gil Tejada Jr.; Khryss Adalia
- Starring: Sunshine Dizon
- Theme music composer: Tata Betita
- Opening theme: "Ang Mundo Ko'y Ikaw" by Jonalyn Viray
- Ending theme: "Tayong Dalawa" by Aicelle Santos
- Country of origin: Philippines
- Original language: Tagalog
- No. of episodes: 145 + 2 specials

Production
- Executive producer: Mona Coles-Mayuga
- Camera setup: Multiple-camera setup
- Running time: 30–45 minutes
- Production company: GMA Entertainment TV

Original release
- Network: GMA Network
- Release: September 11, 2006 – March 30, 2007

Bakekang is a Philippine television drama series broadcast by GMA Network. The series is based on a Philippine graphic novel by Carlo J. Caparas. Directed by Gil Tejada Jr. and Khryss Adalia, it stars Sunshine Dizon in the title role. It premiered on September 11, 2006 on the network's Telebabad line up. The series concluded on March 30, 2007, with a total of 145 episodes.

== Cast and characters ==
Cast

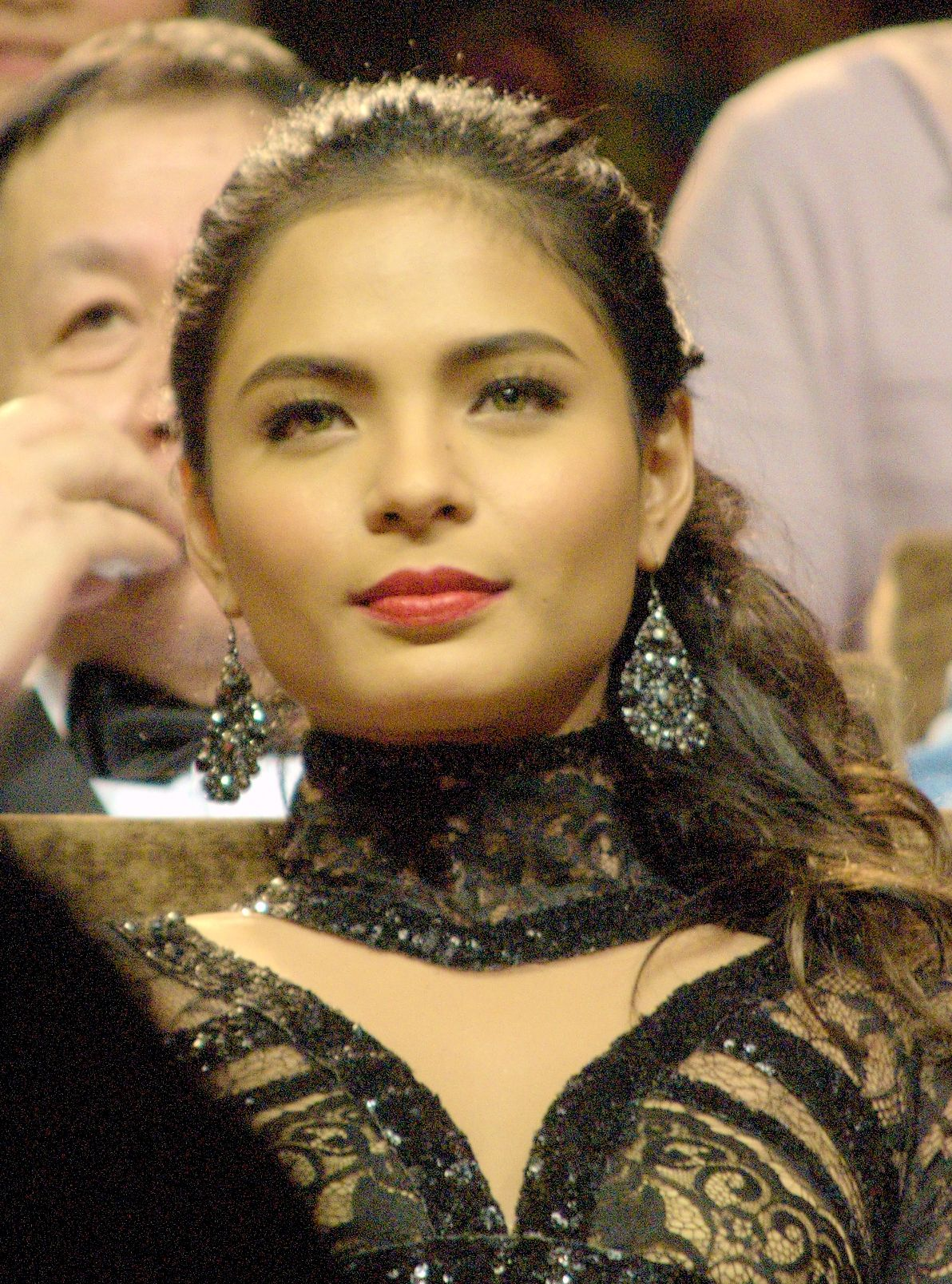
Lovi Poe

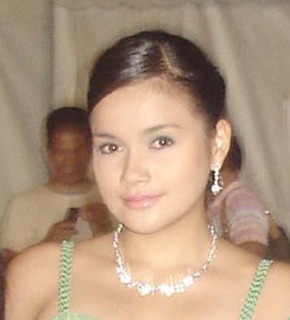
Yasmien Kurdi

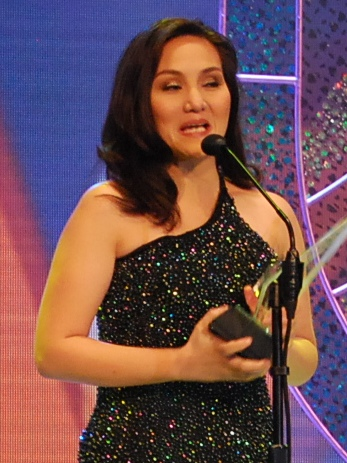
Gladys Reyes

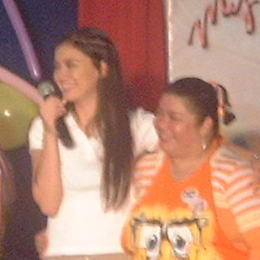
Nadine Samonte (left)

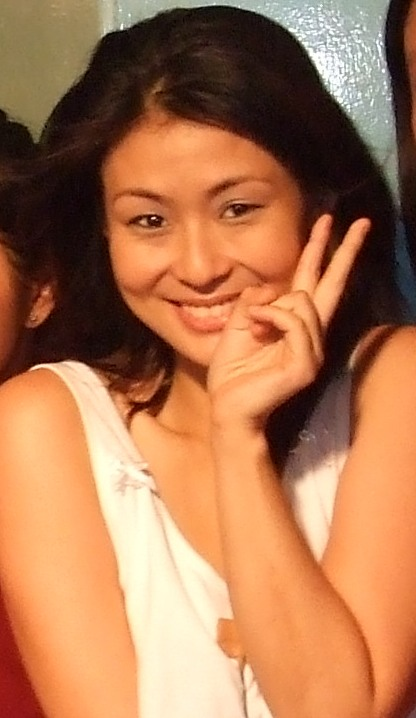
Iwa Moto

Lead cast

- Sunshine Dizon as Jacoba "Bakekang" Maisog

Supporting cast

- Lovi Poe as Kristal Maisog
- Yasmien Kurdi as Charming Maisog / Lokresha / Karisma
- Sheryl Cruz as Valeria Arevalo
- Manilyn Reynes as Marta
- Jay Manalo as Kristof Arevalo
- Gladys Reyes as Deborah Yokohama
- Nadine Samonte as Lorraine Arevalo
- Dion Ignacio as Aldrin Sandoval
- Iwa Moto as Jenny
- Arci Muñoz as Nicole

Recurring cast

- Victor Neri as Herman
- Cogie Domingo as Johnny
- Julia Clarete as Georgia
- Tyron Perez as Paolo
- Hero Angeles as Daniel Lozano
- Vangie Labalan as Mameng
- Marky Cielo as Michael
- Marky Lopez as Paking
- Rainier Castillo as Joshua
- Lotlot de Leon as Rita
- Soxie Topacio as Vincent
- Sheila Marie Rodriguez as Izzy
- Jennifer Sevilla as Stella
- Dionne de Guzman as Otik
- Ailyn Luna as Rea

Guest cast

- Eunice Lagusad as younger Charming
- Krystal Reyes as younger Kristal
- Joy Folloso as younger Lorraine
- Renzo Almario as younger Michael
- Romnick Sarmenta as Francis
- Luz Valdez as Maria
- Evangeline Pascual as Valeria's mom
- Marcus Madrigal as Manfred
- Chinggoy Alonzo as Rod
- Maritoni Fernandez as Elsa
- Isko Moreno as Victor
- Kenneth Ocampo as Romy

== Accolades ==
Accolades received by Bakekang
Year	Award	Category	Recipient	Result	Ref.
2007	21st PMPC Star Awards for Television	Best Primetime Drama Series	Bakekang	Nominated	
2007	21st PMPC Star Awards for Television	Best Drama Actress	Sunshine Dizon Manilyn Reynes	Won	
2007	21st PMPC Star Awards for Television	Best Drama Actress	Sunshine Dizon Manilyn Reynes	Nominated	
2007	21st PMPC Star Awards for Television	Best New Female Personality	Lovi Poe	Won	
2007	3rd USTv Students Choice Awards	Best Drama Mini-Series	Bakekang	Won	
