= Krystal Reyes =

Filipino actress

- Born: Jolina Marie Bautista Reyes; September 8, 1996 (age 30); Santa Maria, Bulacan, Philippines
- Years active: 2005–present
- Spouse: Lawrence Dela Cruz (m. 2025)
- Children: 1
- Relatives: Mark A. Reyes (uncle)

Jolina Marie Bautista Reyes-Dela Cruz (born September 8, 1996), better known by her stage name Krystal Reyes, is a Filipino actress.

== Career ==
She became famous for her role as the young Kristal in the teledrama Bakekang, a role where she would eventually gain her current screen name. After the show ended, she landed her first starring role as Princess, one of the two title characters in Princess Charming, another Philippine drama. Her biggest break came when she landed the role of Anghelita in Mga Mata ni Anghelita, a remake of the 1978 Philippine movie of the same title (without the letter H on it) which made famous the late Julie Vega. Fellow child actress Ella Guevara was originally considered for the role, but since Guevara was by then already part of the main cast of another teledrama entitled Impostora, Reyes was able to land the role. Other than her appearances on television, she has also appeared in the film Shake, Rattle & Roll 8.

Reyes won Best Children's Show Host together with Pia Arcangel and Tonipet Gaba for Art Angel in the 2007 PMPC Star Awards for Television, as well as Best Children's Show. Art Angel again won Best Children's Show in the 2008 and 2009 PMPC Star Awards for Television.

In 2012, she appeared in Hiram na Puso as Angeline and her comeback drama show Hindi Ka na Mag-iisa as Angelica.

Reyes was part of the 2013 remake of the 1996 hit TV series Anna Karenina with Barbie Forteza and Joyce Ching.

After Healing Hearts, she became semi-active in showbiz to focus on her studies. She's currently a freelancer, though she occasionally appears on GMA.

== Personal life ==
Reyes was born in Barangay Bulac, Santa Maria, Bulacan. Krystal is the niece of GMA resident director Mark Reyes.

In March 2024, Reyes is engaged to her non-showbiz partner Lawrence dela Cruz. "I’d like to hang out with you for my whole life," Krystal wrote in Instagram as he proposed to her in a resort in Basco, Batanes. Reyes announced her pregnancy on March 2026, and gave birth on September 12, 2026 on her first child, named Calen.

== Filmography ==
=== Film ===
Year	Title	Role
2006	Shake, Rattle and Roll 8: 13th Floor	Alex
2011	Tween Academy: Class of 2012	Sandy
2012	Si Agimat, si Enteng Kabisote at si Ako	Krystal
2019	Apple of My Eye	Apple

=== Television ===
Year	Title	Role
2006	Carlo J. Caparas' Bakekang	Young Kristal Maisog
2007	Princess Charming	Princess de Saavedra
2007	Sine Novela: Pati Ba Pintig ng Puso	Young Claire
2007	Mga Mata ni Anghelita	Anghelita
2007	La Vendetta	Young Eloisa Salumbides-Cardinale
2007	Sine Novela: My Only Love	Young Cindy
2008	Sine Novela: Kaputol ng Isang Awit	Young Joanna Ambrosio / Joanna Rivera
2008	Sine Novela: : Gaano Kadalas ang Minsan	Lara
2008	LaLola	Che Che
2009	Sine Novela: Dapat Ka Bang Mahalin?	Angeli Claro
2009	Rosalinda	Lucy Perez
2010–2011	Bantatay	Emily Razon
2011–2012	Reel Love Presents Tween Hearts	Mallory Santos
2011–2012	Munting Heredera	Gemmalyn "Gemma" Sarmiento
2012	Hiram na Puso	Angeline Saavedra†
2012	Hindi Ka na Mag-iisa	Angelica Montenegro
2013	Bukod Kang Pinagpala	Janella Perez
2013	Magpakailanman: Batang Ina	Tintin Ng
2013	Magpakailanman: Kambal na Sapi	Lourdes
2013	Anna Karenina	Anna Karenina "Anna" Serrano / Elisa Caluya / Anna Karenina "Anna" Monteclaro Dizon
2014	Maynila: Papa's Girl	Erika
2014	Magpakailanman: Retokadang Ina	Young Michelle
2014	Magpakailanman: Ang Inang Yaya	Jaica
2014	Magpakailanman: Ang Pusong 'Di Makalimot	Ayn
2014	Carmela	Janine Fernandez-Torres†
2015	Maynila: Second Princess	Faith
2015	Healing Hearts	Chloe Samonte
2015	Maynila: Signs of Love	Girlie
2015	Karelasyon: Batang Ina	Mela
2016	Maynila: Party Pa More	Lara
2017	Eat Bulaga!	Segment Guest
2018	Wish Ko Lang: Sa Tindahan ni Trisha	Trisha
2018	Pop Talk	Episode Guest
2018	Maynila: The Set Up	Pearl
2018	Tadhana: DH for Sale	Denise
2019	Magpakailanman: The Wife's Revenge	Young Eva
2020	Bawal na Game Show	Herself / Contestant
2021	Imbestigador: Ebeng Mayor Homicide	Ebeng Mayor

== Awards and nominations ==
Year	Award	Category	Result
2007	Yes! Magazine 100 Most Beautiful stars 2007	Newbie category	Won
2007	PMPC Star Awards for Television	Best Children's Show Host together with Pia Arcangel and Tonipet Gaba	Won
2012	Teen Citation Choice Award	Best Teen Actress for Hindi Ka na Mag-iisa	Nominated
2013	Yes! Magazine 100 Most Beautiful stars 2013	Comeback category	Won
2013	Paulines Telefest Awards	Most Watched Telenovela for Anna Karenina	Won
2013	27th PMPC Star Awards for Television	Best Single Performance by an Actress for Magpakailanman: Batang Ina: The Tintin Ng Story	Nominated
