= Ella Guevara =

Filipino actress

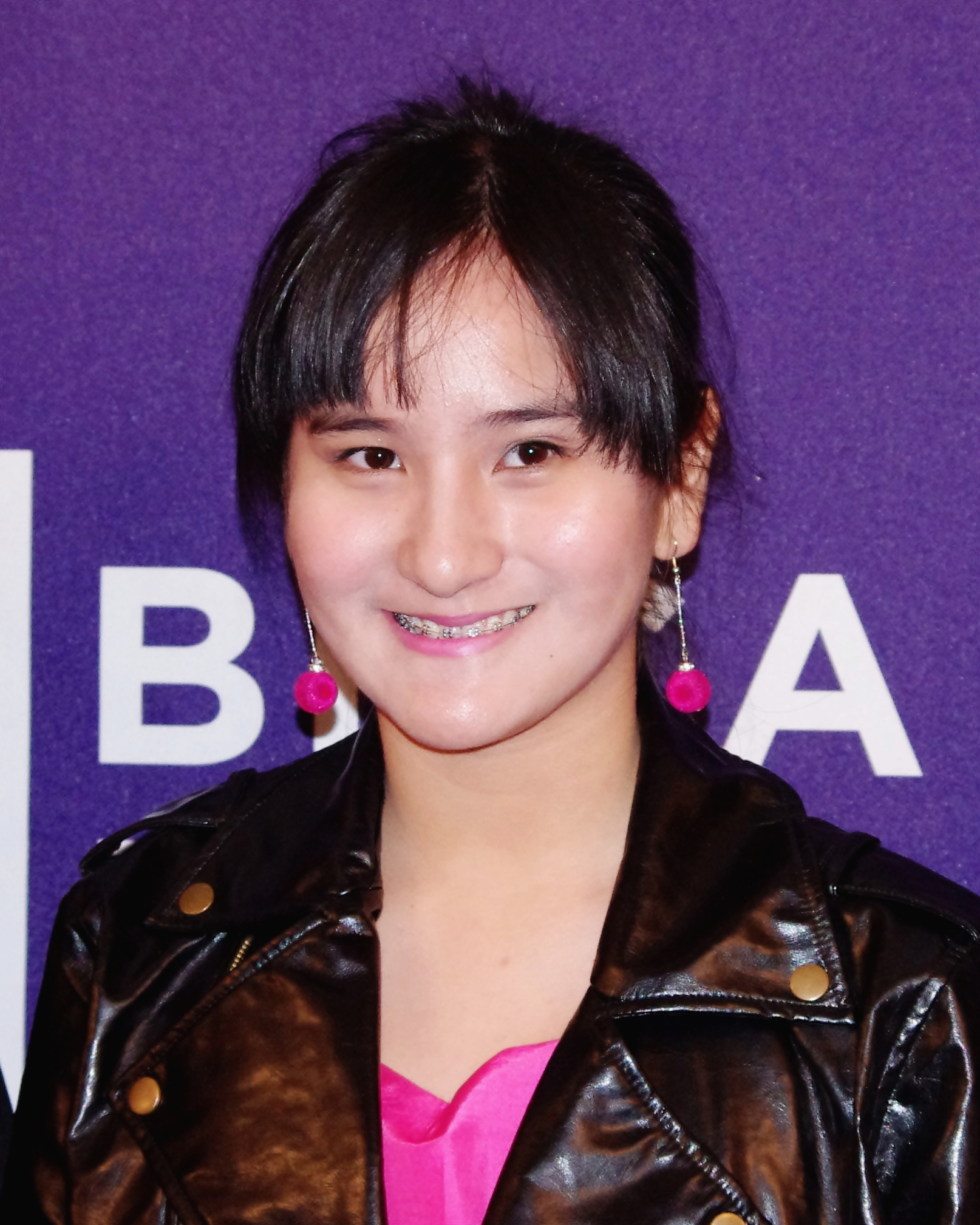
- Ella Guevara in 2012
- Born: Janella Denise Yuson Guevara; August 19, 1998 (age 28); Quezon City, Philippines
- Occupation: Actress
- Years active: 2004–2014

Ella Guevara (born Janella Denise Yuson Guevara; August 19, 1998, Quezon City) is a Filipino former actress. She rose to fame through her appearance on a talent search on television called StarStruck Kids that aired on the Filipino television channel GMA 7. Although she did not go on to win the said competition, she has since gone on to make several television and film appearances, mostly on the same network and has proven her worth as a child actress when she won as best child actress 5 times in a row, making her one of the most popular child actresses in the Philippines.

== Filmography ==
=== Films ===
Year	Title	Role
2004	Kilig...Pintig...Yanig	
2004	Birhen ng Manaog	
2004	Sigaw	Lara
2005	Say That You Love Me	Young Kristine
2005	Hari Ng Sablay: Isang tama, sampung mali!	Young Venus
2005	Ako Legal Wife	Anthurium Chiong
2006	Mano Po 5: Gua Ai Di	Suzie
2006	Umiyak Man Ang Langit	
2007	Blackout	Isabel
2007	Ouija	Young Romina
2010	Ang Babae sa Sementeryo	Agnes
2012	Limang Dipang Tao	Annaliza
2013	Sonata	Mirela
2014	Yellow Voices	Ellaine

=== Television ===
Year	Title	Role
2004	StarStruck Kids	Herself
2004	Magpakailanman	Young Patricia Javier
2004	Love to Love	Belai
2005	Bubble Gang Jr.	Herself
2005	Darna	Lenlen
2005	Now and Forever: Agos	Jane
2005-2006	Etheria: Ang Ikalimang Kaharian ng Encantadia	Cassandra
2006	Encantadia: Pag-ibig Hanggang Wakas	Cassandra
2006	Love to Love	Pia
2006	Now and Forever: Duyan	Cindy
2007	Asian Treasures	Young Gabriela
2007	Sine Novela: Sinasamba Kita	Young Divina
2007	Sine Novela: Pati Ba Pintig ng Puso	Young Betty
2007	Impostora	Kathleen Cayetano
2007	Kids on Q	Herself
2007-2008	La Vendetta	Jessie Cardinale
2007	Sine Novela: My Only Love	Young Trixie
2009	Totoy Bato	Young Anna
2009	Sine Novela: Kung Aagawin Mo ang Lahat sa Akin	Young Maureen Andrada
2010	Darna	New Narda (finale only)
2010	Langit Sa Piling Mo	Young Aurora
2010	Pidol's Wonderland	Various
2011	Bagets: Just Got Lucky	

== Awards ==
- Best Child Performer of year 2004 - Metro Manila Film Festival (MMFF)
- Most popular child actress 2005 (Guillermo Mendoza Memorial Foundation awards)
- Best Child Actress of year 2006 (FAMAS Awards)
- Most Popular Child Actress 2007 (Guillermo Mendoza Memorial Foundation awards)
