= Pop Talk =

Philippine television news magazine show

- Title card in 2021
- Genre: News magazine
- Presented by: Tonipet Gaba
- Country of origin: Philippines
- Original language: Tagalog

Production
- Executive producer: Luz Alfaro-Balingit
- Camera setup: Multiple-camera setup
- Running time: 30 minutes
- Production company: GMA News and Public Affairs

Original release
- Network: GMA News TV (2011–21); GTV (2021)
- Release: March 1, 2011 – October 5, 2021

Pop Talk is a Philippine television news magazine show broadcast by GMA News TV and GTV. Hosted by Tonipet Gaba, it premiered on March 1, 2011. The show concluded on October 5, 2021.

== Production ==
The production was halted in March 2020 due to the enhanced community quarantine in Luzon caused by the COVID-19 pandemic. The show resumed its programming on November 14, 2020.

== Accolades ==
Accolades received by Pop Talk
Year	Award	Category	Recipient	Result	Ref.
2011	Golden Screen TV Awards	Outstanding Lifestyle Program	Pop Talk	Nominated	
2011	Golden Screen TV Awards	Outstanding Lifestyle Program Host	Tonipet Gaba	Nominated	
2013	35th Catholic Mass Media Awards	Best Children and Youth Program	Pop Talk	Won	
2013	Golden Screen TV Awards	Outstanding Lifestyle Program	Pop Talk	Nominated	
2013	Golden Screen TV Awards	Outstanding Lifestyle Program Host	Tonipet Gaba	Nominated	
2014	Golden Screen TV Awards	Outstanding Lifestyle Program	Pop Talk	Nominated	
2014	Golden Screen TV Awards	Outstanding Lifestyle Program Host	Tonipet Gaba	Nominated	
2014	28th PMPC Star Awards for Television	Best Magazine Show	Pop Talk	Nominated	
2014	28th PMPC Star Awards for Television	Best Magazine Show Host	Tonipet Gaba	Nominated	
2015	29th PMPC Star Awards for Television	Best Magazine Show Host	Tonipet Gaba	Nominated	
2016	30th PMPC Star Awards for Television	Best Magazine Show	Pop Talk	Nominated	
2016	30th PMPC Star Awards for Television	Best Magazine Show Host	Tonipet Gaba	Nominated	
2018	1st Dangal ng Bayan Awards	Media Excellence for Hotel and Restaurant Management	Pop Talk	Won	
2021	34th PMPC Star Awards for Television	Best Lifestyle Show	Pop Talk	Nominated	
2021	34th PMPC Star Awards for Television	Best Lifestyle Show Host	Tonipet Gaba	Nominated	
