= Kids on Q =

Philippine television infotainment show

- Title card
- Genre: Infotainment
- Directed by: Armin Collado
- Presented by: Tonipet Gaba
- Opening theme: "Kids on Q theme song"
- Country of origin: Philippines
- Original language: Tagalog
- No. of episodes: 135

Production
- Executive producer: Jacel Arqueros
- Camera setup: Multiple-camera setup
- Running time: 60 minutes
- Production company: GMA News and Public Affairs

Original release
- Network: Q
- Release: April 28, 2007 – January 30, 2010

Kids on Q is a Philippine television infotainment children's show broadcast by Q. Hosted by Tonipet Gaba, it premiered on April 28, 2007. The show concluded on January 30, 2010, with a total of 135 episodes.

== Accolades ==
Accolades received by Kids on Q
Year	Award	Category	Recipient	Result	Ref.
2008	Anak TV Seal Awards		Kids on Q	Won	
2008	Catholic Mass Media Awards	Best Children's Program	Kids on Q	Won	
2008	Taiwan International Children's Film Festival	Best TV Program	Kids on Q	Nominated	
2008	US International Film and Video Festival	Certificate	Kids on Q	Won	
2009	Anak TV Seal Awards		Kids on Q	Won	
2009	Catholic Mass Media Awards	Best Children's Program	Kids on Q	Won	
2009	MTRCB TV Awards	Best Children's Show	Kids on Q	Nominated	

PMPC Star Awards for Television

- 2007-09 Nominated, Best Children's Show & Hosts
