= 37th PMPC Star Awards for Television =

Philippine television award show held in 2023

- Date: August 24, 2025
- Location: VS Hotel Convention Center
- Presented by: Philippine Movie Press Club
- Hosted by: Boy Abunda; Pops Fernandez; Gela Atayde; Elijah Canlas; Robi Domingo

Television/radio coverage
- Network: None
- Produced by: None
- Directed by: Vivian Poblete Blancaflor

The 37th PMPC Star Awards for Television honors the best in Philippine television programming from 2022 to 2023, as chosen by the Philippine Movie Press Club. The ceremony was held at the VS Hotel Convention Center on August 24, 2025. The ceremony was hosted by Boy Abunda, Pops Fernandez, Gela Atayde, Elijah Canlas and Robi Domingo.

The nominations were announced by the Press on July 26, 2025.

== Winners and Nominees ==
Winners are listed first and highlighted in bold:

=== Networks ===
Best TV Station
- **GMA 7**
  - All TV 2
  - PTV 4
  - TV5
  - CNN Philippines 9
  - A2Z 11
  - IBC 13
  - Net 25
  - GTV 27
  - UNTV 37
  - INC TV 48
  - Knowledge Channel

=== Programs ===
Best Primetime Drama Series	Best Daytime Drama Series
**Maria Clara at Ibarra (GMA 7)**; Can't Buy Me Love (A2Z 11/TV5); Dirty Linen (A2Z 11/TV5); FPJ's Batang Quiapo (A2Z 11/TV5); Royal Blood (GMA 7); Senior High (A2Z 11/TV5); Unbreak My Heart (GMA 7)	**Abot-Kamay na Pangarap (GMA 7)**; AraBella (GMA 7); Nakarehas na Puso (GMA 7); Nag-aapoy na Damdamin (A2Z 11/TV5); Pira-Pirasong Paraiso (A2Z 11/TV5); Stolen Life (GMA 7)
Best Drama Anthology	Best Drama Mini Series
**Magpakailanman (GMA 7)**; For the Love (TV5); Landas ng Buhay (INC TV 48); Regal Studio Presents (GMA 7); Tadhana (GMA 7)	**Walang Matigas na Pulis sa Matinik na Misis (GMA 7)**; Daig Kayo ng Lola Ko (GMA 7); How to Move On In 30 Days (A2Z 11); My Sunset Girl (A2Z 11); The Rain In España (TV5); Sparkle U (GMA 7); Tara, G! (A2Z 11)
Best Comedy Show	Best Variety Show
**Pepito Manaloto (GMA 7)**; GoodWill (Net 25); Oh No! It's B.O. (Net 25); One for All, All for One (INC TV 48); Quizon CT (Net 25); Wow Mali: Doble Tama (TV5)	**It's Showtime (A2Z 11 / GTV 27)**; All-Out Sundays (GMA 7); TiktoClock (GMA 7); Wowowin (All TV 2)
Best Game Show	Best Celebrity Talk Show
**Emojination (TV5)**; Everybody, Sing! (A2Z 11/TV5); Spingo (TV5); Tara Game, Agad-Agad (Net 25)	**Fast Talk with Boy Abunda (GMA 7)**; Korina Interviews (Net 25); Magandang ARAw (Net 25); Magandang Buhay (A2Z 11/All TV 2); M.O.M.S — Mhies on a Mission (All TV 2); Toni (All TV 2)
Best News Program	Public Affairs Program
**24 Oras (GMA 7)**; Balitanghali (GTV 27); Frontline Pilipinas (TV5); PTV News Tonight (PTV 4); Saksi (GMA 7); State of the Nation (GTV 27); TV Patrol (A2Z 11)	**Cayetano in Action with Boy Abunda (GMA 7)**; Ano Sa Palagay N'yo? (Net 25); The Final Word with Rico Hizon (CNN Philippines 9); Iskoolmates (PTV 4); Open For Business (Net 25); Reality Check with Tito Sotto (Net 25); The Source (CNN Philippines 9)
Best Morning Show	Best Public Service Program
**Unang Hirit (GMA 7)**; Good Morning Kuya (UNTV 37); Gud Morning Kapatid (TV5); Kada Umaga (Net 25); Love Tonipet and Everythaaang! (Net 25); Rise and Shine Pilipinas (PTV 4)	**Wish Ko Lang! (GMA 7)**; Healing Galing (GMA 7); Imbestigador (GMA 7); My Puhunan: Kaya Mo! (A2Z 11); Resibo: Walang Lusot ang May Atraso (GMA 7); Responde: Mata ng Mamamayan (Net 25); Sumbong N'yo, Aksyon Agad (UNTV 37)
Best Documentary Program	Best Magazine Show
**The Atom Araullo Specials (GMA 7)**; Brigada (GTV 27); Gus Abelgas: Forensics (TV5); IJuander (GTV 27); Paninindigan (INC TV 48); Public Eye (PTV 4); Reporter's Notebook (GMA 7)	**Kapuso Mo, Jessica Soho (GMA 7)**; Business Matters (CNN Philippines); Negosyo Goals (All TV 2); On Assignment (PTV 4); Rated Korina (A2Z 11/TV5); Tao Po! (A2Z 11)
Best Lifestyle/Travel Show	Best Best Children Show
**Pinas Sarap (GTV 27)**; Biyahe ni Drew (GTV 27); Farm to Table (GTV 27); I Heart PH (CNN Philippines 9); Lutong Daza (Net 25); Manibela (UNTV 37)	**Talents Academy (IBC 13)**; Art Academy (Net 25); Little Juan's Playlist (INC TV 48); Wikaharian (Knowledge Channel)

=== Personalities ===
Best Drama Actor	Best Drama Actress
**Joshua Garcia - Unbreak My Heart (GMA 7)**; Dingdong Dantes - Royal Blood (GMA 7); Ruru Madrid - Black Rider (GMA 7); Coco Martin - FPJ's Batang Quiapo (A2Z 11/TV5); Zanjoe Marudo - Dirty Linen (A2Z 11/TV5); Donny Pangilinan - Can't Buy Me Love (A2Z 11/TV5); Dennis Trillo - Maria Clara at Ibarra (GMA 7)	**Rhian Ramos - Royal Blood (GMA 7)**; Bea Alonzo - Love Before Sunrise (GMA 7); Andrea Brillantes - Senior High (A2Z 11/TV5); Barbie Forteza - Maria Clara at Ibarra (GMA 7); Janine Gutierrez - Dirty Linen (A2Z 11/TV5); Jodi Sta. Maria - Unbreak My Heart (GMA 7); Jillian Ward - Abot-Kamay na Pangarap (GMA 7)
Best Drama Supporting Actor	Best Drama Supporting Actress
**Elijah Canlas - Senior High (A2Z 11/TV5)**; John Arcilla - Dirty Linen (A2Z 11/TV5); Christopher de Leon - FPJ's Batang Quiapo (A2Z 11/TV5); Baron Geisler - Senior High (A2Z 11/TV5); Joel Lamangan - FPJ's Batang Quiapo (A2Z 11/TV5); Kristoffer Martin - Mga Lihim ni Urduja (GMA 7); Joel Torre - Dirty Linen (A2Z 11/TV5)	**Cherry Pie Picache - FPJ's Batang Quiapo (A2Z 11/TV5)**; Pinky Amador - Abot-Kamay na Pangarap (GMA 7); Angel Aquino - Dirty Linen (A2Z 11/TV5); Rio Locsin - Black Rider (GMA 7); Gladys Reyes - Black Rider (GMA 7); Sylvia Sanchez - Senior High (A2Z 11/TV5); Maricel Soriano - Pira-Pirasong Paraiso (A2Z 11/TV5)
Best Single Performance by An Actor	Best Single Performance by An Actress
**Alden Richards - Magpakailanman: Sa Puso At Isipan (GMA 7)**; Benjamin Alves - Magpakailanman: Mister Na Walang Misis (GMA 7); Martin del Rosario - Magpakailanman: Almost A Champion (GMA 7); Kokoy de Santos - Magpakailanman: A Son's Promise (GMA 7); Gabby Eigenmann - Magpakailanman: Mana Sa Inang Ama (GMA 7); Edgar Allan Guzman - Magpakailanman: Love Times Three (GMA 7); Rocco Nacino - Magpakailanman: Ang Batang Hamog (GMA 7)	**Rochelle Pangilinan - Magpakailanman: The Abused Teacher (GMA 7)**; Irma Adlawan - Tadhana: My Golden Love (GMA 7); Amy Austria - Magpakailanman: I Am Not My Mother (GMA 7); Rita Avila - Magpakailanman: Ina Ka Ng Anak Mo (GMA 7); Shamaine Buencamino - Magpakailanman: Ang Batang Hamog (GMA 7); Therese Malvar - Magpakailanman: Bayad Utang (GMA 7); Rhian Ramos - Magpakailanman: Ang Hiling sa Diyos (GMA 7)
Best Child Performer	Best New Male TV Personality
**Euwenn Mikaell - The Write One (GMA 7)**; Brianna Advincula - Tadhana: Bayad-Utang (GMA 7); Kian Co - The Write One (GMA 7); Chastity Dizon - Can't Buy Me Love (A2Z 11/TV5); JJ Quilantang - Dirty Linen (A2Z 11/TV5); Althea Ruedas - Dirty Linen (A2Z 11/TV5); Grant Sommereux - One For All, All For One (INC TV 48)	**John Clifford - Pepito Manaloto (GMA 7)**; Tommy Alejandrino - Senior High (A2Z 11/TV5); Argus Aspiras - It's Showtime (A2Z 11/GTV 27); Raheel Bhyria - Luv Is: Caught In His Arms (GMA 7); Larkin Castor - Mano Po Legacy: The Flower Sisters (GMA 7); Ethan David - For The Love: Ligaya (TV5); Vince Maristela - Love Before Sunrise (GMA 7); Christophe Sommereux - One For All, All For One (INC TV 48); Aidan Veneracion - Royal Blood (GMA 7)
Best New Female TV Personality	Best Comedy Actor
**Gela Atayde - Senior High (A2Z 11/TV5)**; Princess Kathryn "Kulot" Caponpon - It's Showtime (A2Z 11/GTV 27); Carren Eistrup - E.A.T. (TV5); Sam Coloso - Spingo (TV5); Charlie Fleming - Royal Blood (GMA 7); Atasha Muhlach - E.A.T. (TV5); Ashtine Olviga - For The Love: Ligaya (TV5)	**Paolo Contis - Bubble Gang (GMA 7)**; Wally Bayola - Wow Mali: Doble Tama (TV5); Jose Manalo - Wow Mali: Doble Tama (TV5); Eric Quizon - Quizon CT (Net 25); Vandolph Quizon - Quizon CT (Net 25); Betong Sumaya - Bubble Gang (GMA 7); Michael V. - Pepito Manaloto (GMA 7)
Best Comedy Actress	Best Male TV Host
**Chariz Solomon - Bubble Gang (GMA 7)**; Analyn Barro - Bubble Gang (GMA 7); Meg Imperial - GoodWill (Net 25); Valeen Montenegro - Bubble Gang (GMA 7); Gladys Reyes - One For All, All For One (INC TV 48); Manilyn Reynes - Pepito Manaloto (GMA 7); Tuesday Vargas - Bubble Gang (GMA 7)	**Paolo Ballesteros - E.A.T. (TV5)**; **Robi Domingo - ASAP Natin 'To (A2Z 11/TV5)**; Vice Ganda - It's Showtime (A2Z 11/GTV 27); Martin Nievera - ASAP Natin 'To (A2Z 11/TV5); Alden Richards - All-Out Sundays (GMA 7); Vic Sotto – E.A.T. (TV5); Gary Valenciano - ASAP Natin 'To (A2Z 11/TV5)
Best Female TV Host	Best Game Show Host
**Kim Chiu - It's Showtime (A2Z 11/GTV 27)**; Anne Curtis - It's Showtime (A2Z 11/GTV 27); Karylle – It's Showtime (A2Z 11/GTV 27); Maine Mendoza - E.A.T. (TV5); Amy Perez - It's Showtime (A2Z 11/GTV 27); Pokwang - TiktoClock (GMA 7); Julie Anne San Jose - All-Out Sundays (GMA 7); Regine Velasquez - ASAP (A2Z 11/TV5)	**Dingdong Dantes - Family Feud (GMA 7)**; John Arcilla and Sam Coloso - Spingo (TV5); Awra Briguela and Maja Salvador - Emojination (TV5); Vice Ganda - Everybody, Sing! (A2Z 11/TV5); Aga Muhlach, Daiana Menezes and Yukii Takahashi - Tara Game, Agad-Agad (Net 25)
Best Celebrity Talk Show Host	Best Male Newscaster
**Boy Abunda - Fast Talk with Boy Abunda (GMA 7)**; Melai Cantiveros, Jolina Magdangal and Regine Velasquez - Magandang Buhay (A2Z 11/TV5); Toni Gonzaga - Toni (All TV 2); Ruffa Gutierrez, Mariel Rodriguez and Ciara Sotto - M.O.M.S — Mhies on a Mission (All TV 2); Ara Mina - Magandang ARAw (Net 25); Korina Sanchez - Korina Interviews (Net 25)	**Joee Guilas - PTV News Tonight (PTV 4)**; Noli de Castro - TV Patrol (A2Z 11); Atom Araullo - State of the Nation (GTV 27); Julius Babao - Frontline Pilipinas (TV5); Arnold Clavio - Saksi (GMA 7); Emil Sumangil - 24 Oras (GMA 7); Raffy Tima - Balitanghali (GTV 27)
Best Female Newscaster	Best Public Affairs Program Host
**Karen Davila - TV Patrol (A2Z 11)**; Pia Arcangel - Saksi (GMA 7); Cheryl Cosim - Frontline Pilipinas (TV5); Angelique Lazo - Sentro Balita (PTV 4); Vicky Morales - 24 Oras (GMA 7); Bernadette Sembrano - TV Patrol (A2Z 11); Mel Tiangco - 24 Oras (GMA 7)	**Boy Abunda, Alan Peter Cayetano and Pia Cayetano - Cayetano in Action with Boy Abunda (GMA 7)**; Niña Corpuz - Bagong Pilipinas Ngayon (PTV 4); Rico Hizon - The Final Word with Rico Hizon (CNN Philippines 9); Pat-P Daza and Ali Sotto - Ano Sa Palagay N'yo? (Net 25); Tito Sotto - Reality Check With Tito Sotto (Net 25); Caesar Vallejos - Open For Business (Net 25); Pinky Webb - The Source (CNN Philippines 9)
Best Morning Show Host	Best Public Service Program Host
**Lyn Ching-Pascual, Arnold Clavio, Shaira Diaz, Suzi Entrata-Abrera, Susan Enriquez, Shuvee Etrata, Cheska Fausto, Matteo Guidicelli, Sean Lucas, Ivan Mayrina, Anjo Peritierra, JR Royol, Kaloy Tingkungko and Mariz Umali - Unang Hirit (GMA 7)**; Celine Ang, Tini Balanon, Joshua Dionisio, Ayra Mariano, Nel Maribojoc, Ian Miranda and Daniel Razon – Good Morning Kuya (UNTV 37); Love Anover and Tonipet Gaba - Love Tonipet and Everythaaang! (Net 25); Chi Atienza, Gab Bayan, Fifi delos Santos, Audrey Goricetta, Dianne Medina, Diane Querrer and Edmund Rosales - Rise and Shine Pilipinas (PTV 4); Jes delos Santos, Gretchen Ho, Justin Quirino and Chiqui Roa-Puno - Gud Morning Kapatid (TV5); Pia Guanio, Daiana Menezes and Emma Tiglao - Kada Umaga (Net 25)	**Edinel Calvario - Healing Galing (GMA 7)**; Jackie Aquino, Dot Gancoyo, Bernadette Herrera, Daniel Razon and Annie Rentoy - Serbisyong Bayanihan (UNTV 37); Migs Bustos and Karen Davila - My Puhunan: Kaya Mo! (A2Z 11); Vicky Morales - Wish Ko Lang (GMA 7); Alex Santos - Responde: Mata ng Mamamayan (Net 25); Emil Sumangil - Resibo: Walang Lusot ang May Atraso (GMA 7); Ben Tulfo - Bitag Live (IBC 13)
Best Documentary Program Host	Best Magazine Show Host
**Atom Araullo, John Consulta, Kara David, Mav Gonzales and Howie Severino - i-Witness (GMA 7)**; Gus Abelgas - Gus Abelgas: Forensics (TV5); Atom Araullo - The Atom Araullo Specials (GMA 7); Kara David - Brigada (GTV 27); Susan Enriquez and Mark Salazar - IJuander (GTV 27); Maki Pulido and Jun Veneracion - Reporter's Notebook (GMA 7); Diane Querrer - Aksyon Laban Sa Kahirapan (PTV 4)	**Korina Sanchez - Rated Korina (A2Z 11/TV5)**; Maan Macapagal - On Assignment (PTV 4); Anna Magkawas - Negosyo Goals (All TV 2); Bernadette Sembrano - Tao Po! (A2Z 11); Jessica Soho - Kapuso Mo, Jessica Soho (GMA 7); Pinky Webb - Business Matters (CNN Philippines 9)
Best Lifestyle/Travel Show Host	Best Children Show Host
**Kara David - Pinas Sarap (GTV 27)**; Drew Arellano - Biyahe ni Drew (GTV 27); John Feir and JR Royol - Farm to Table (GTV 27); Pat P. Daza - Lutong Daza (Net 25); Daniel Razon - Manibela (UNTV 37); Valerie Tan - I Heart PH (CNN Philippines 9)	**Nicole Almeer, Candice Ayesha, Cara Bartolo, Anika Figueroa, Aljur Allan Perez and Yzabelle Luisa Perez - Talents Academy (IBC 13)**; Michelle Agas - Wikaharian (Knowledge Channel); Jaden Anunciacion, Edmont Boy, Charm del Castillo, Yanna Gonzales, Anjelo Jamorawon, Vem Lising and Ziahbelle Mazo - Little Juan's Playlist (INC TV 48); Wej Cudiamat, Gianne Llanes and Various Net25 Star Center Artists - Art Academy (Net 25)

== Special awards ==
=== Ading Fernando Lifetime Achievement Award ===
- Geleen Eugenio
- Malou Choa Fagar
- Caridad Sanchez
- Ariel Ureta

=== Excellence in Broadcasting Lifetime Achievement Award ===
- Angelique Lazo

=== German Moreno Power Tandem Award ===
- Barbie Forteza and David Licauco
- Kim Chiu and Paulo Avelino

=== TV Stars of the Year ===
- Sam Verzosa (Male)
- Rhian Ramos (Female)

=== Faces of the Night ===
- Joshua Garcia (Male)
- Rhian Ramos (Female)

=== Timeless Smile Awards ===
- Larkin Castor (Male)
- Gela Atayde (Female)

=== Plaques of Appreciation ===
- Persida Rueda Acosta
- Ernelson Trojillo
- Cecille Bravo
- BingoPlus
- VS Hotel Convention Center
- Isko Moreno

== Most major nominations ==
Nominations by Network
Nominations	Network
94	GMA 7
58	TV5
54	A2Z 11
29	Net 25
22	GTV 27
10	PTV 4
9	CNN Philippines 9
8	INC TV 48
7	All TV 2
4	IBC 13
4	UNTV 37
3	Knowledge Channel

== Most major wins ==
Wins by Network
Wins	Network
27	GMA 7
8	A2Z 11
6	TV5
3	GTV 27
1	PTV 4

== Performers ==
- Dingdong Avanzado
- Jessa Zaragoza
- Christian Bautista
- Kai Montinola
- Jarren Garcia
- One Verse
- InnerVoices
- Jed Madela

== See also ==
- PMPC Star Awards for TV
- 2023 in Philippine television
