= List of All TV original programming =

All TV (stylized as ALLTV2) is a free-to-air broadcast television network in the Philippines owned by Advanced Media Broadcasting System (AMBS). The following is a list of all television original programming by All TV since it began its television operations in 2022.

== Current original programming ==
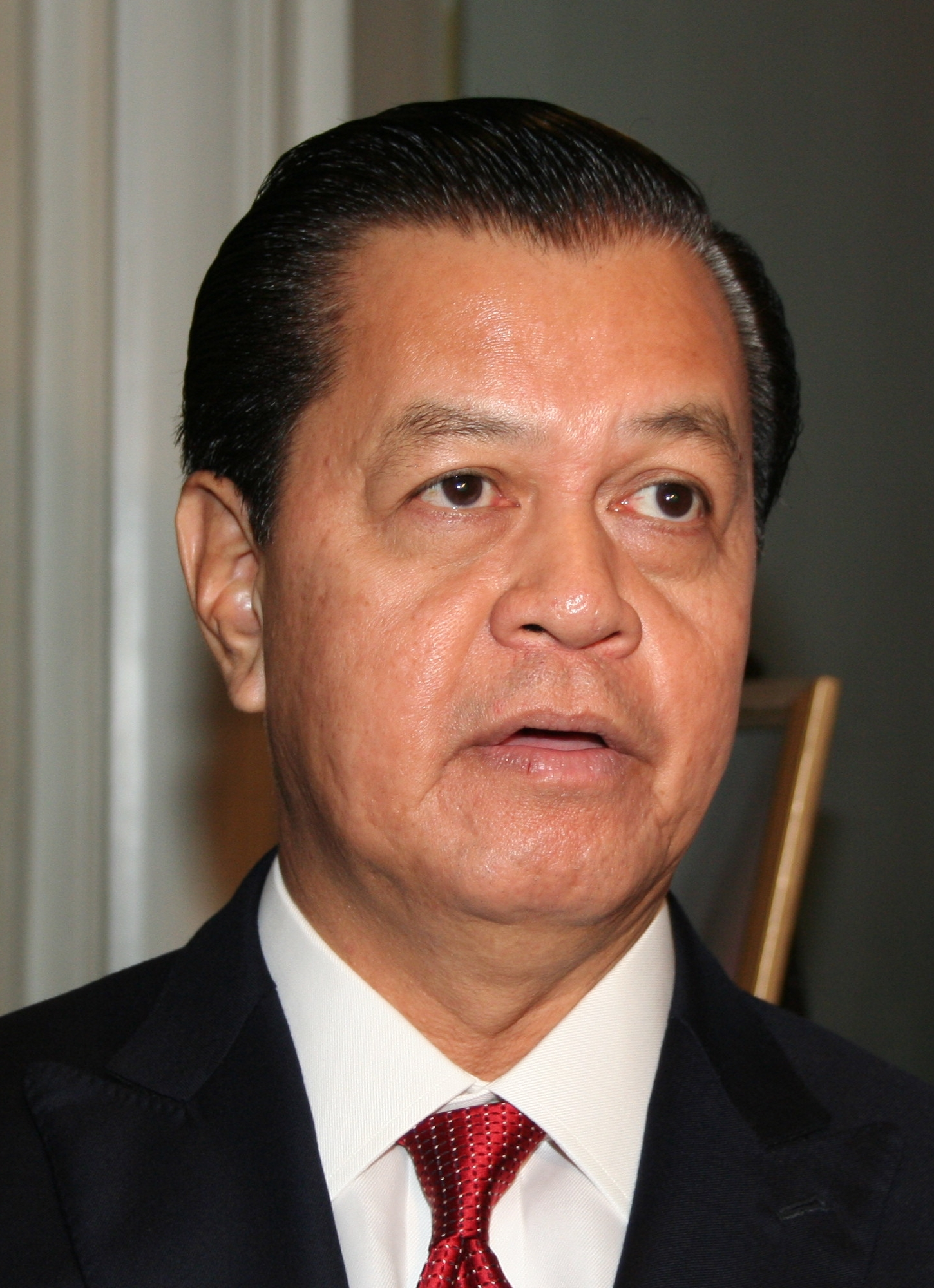
Noli de Castro, anchor of the newscast TV Patrol.

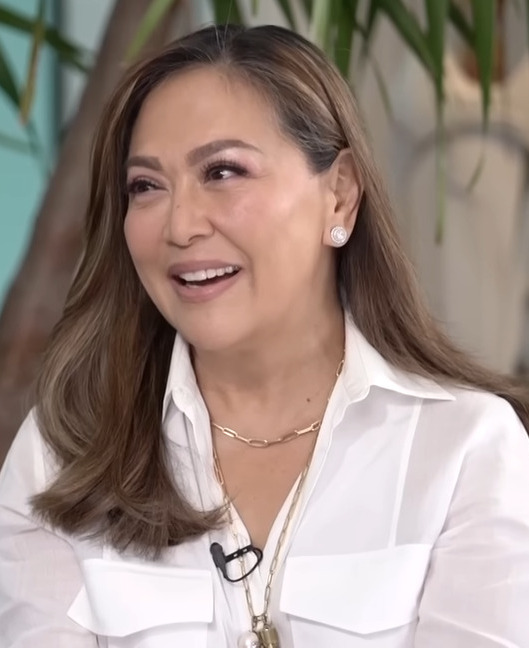
Karen Davila, host of the news magazine show My Puhunan: Kaya Mo! and anchor of the newscast TV Patrol.

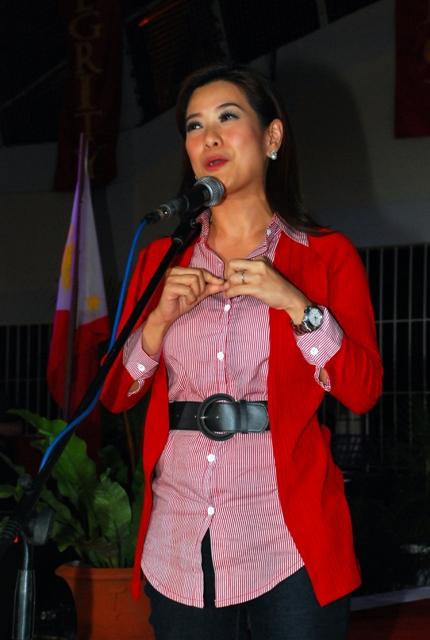
Bernadette Sembrano, anchor of the newscast TV Patrol.

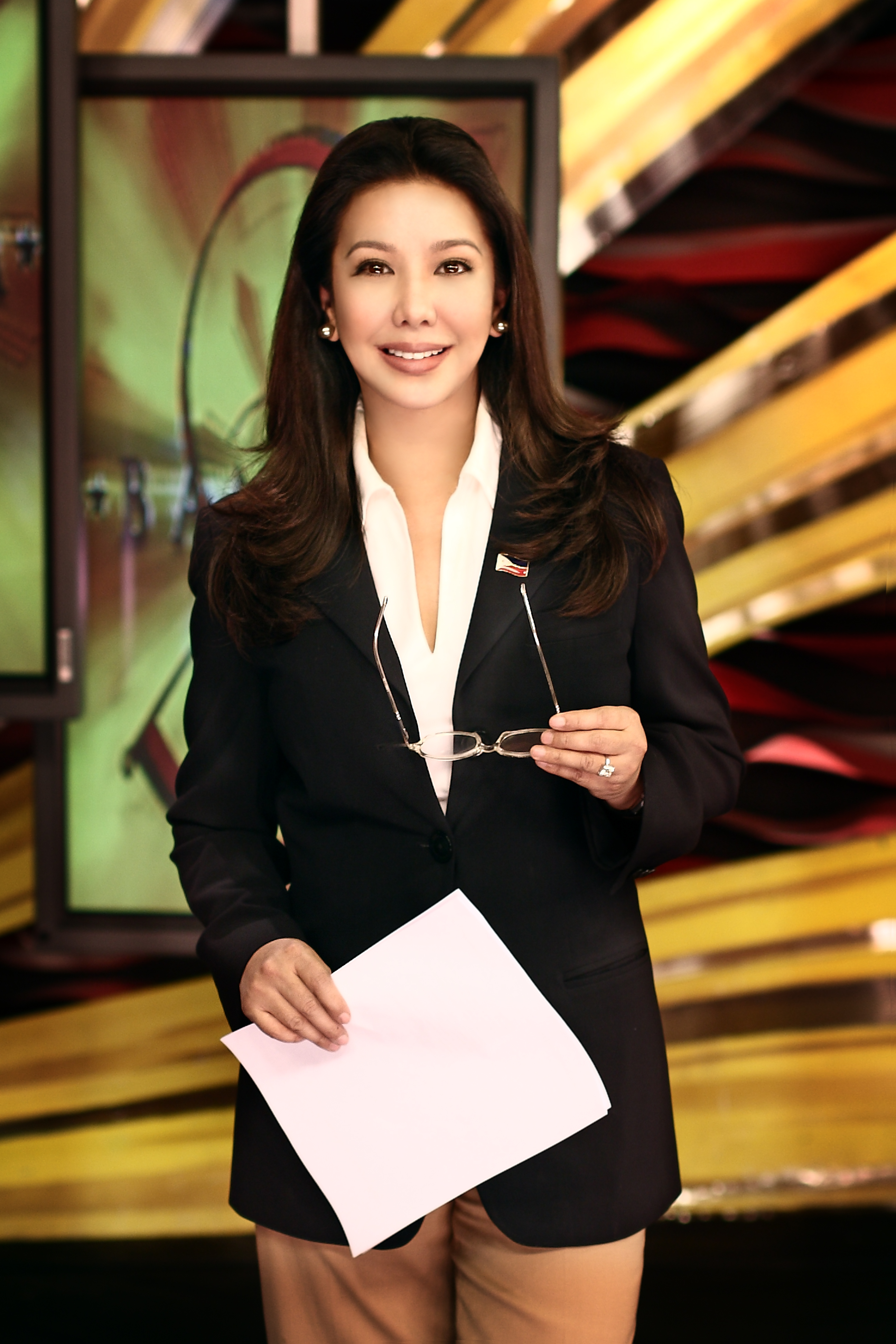
Korina Sanchez, host of the news magazine show Rated Korina and talk show Face to Face with Ate Koring.

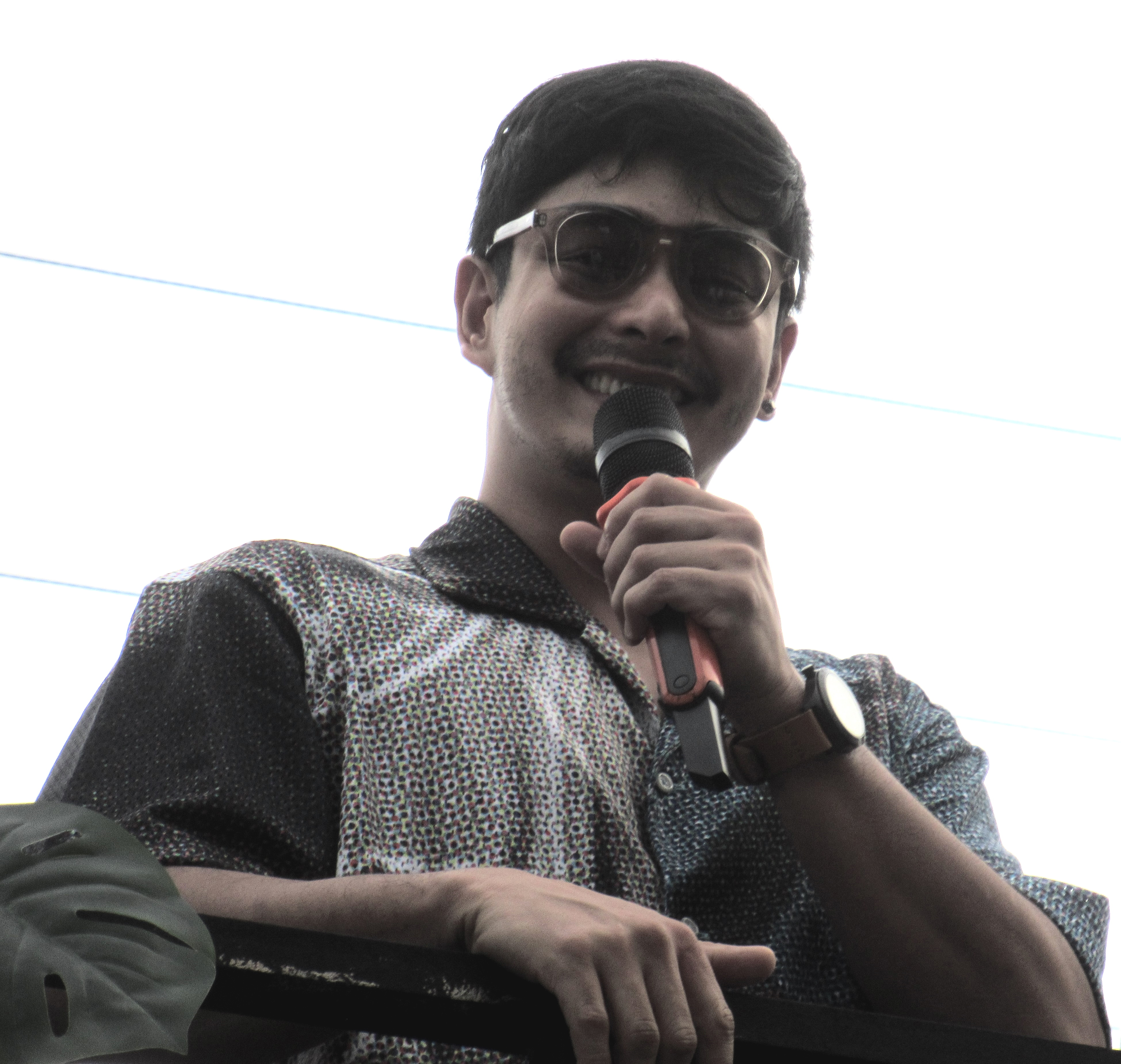
Coco Martin, lead actor of the drama series Coco Martin's Sigabo.

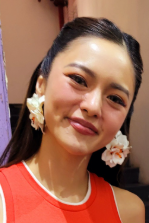
Kim Chiu, hosts of the variety shows It's Showtime and ASAP XP.

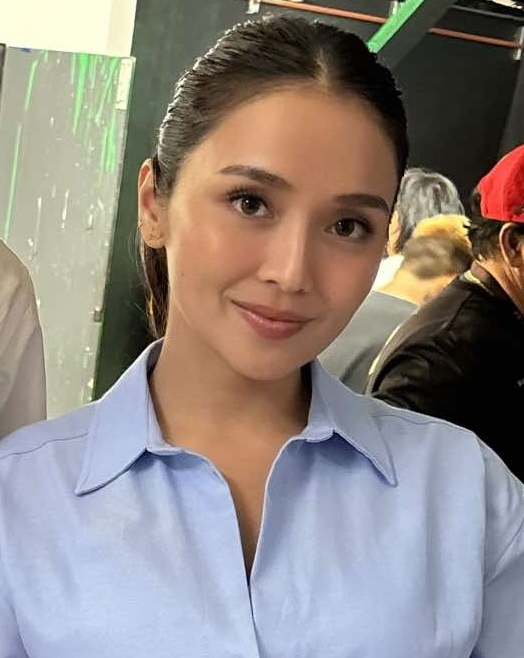
Kathryn Bernardo, lead actress of the drama series Someone, Someday.

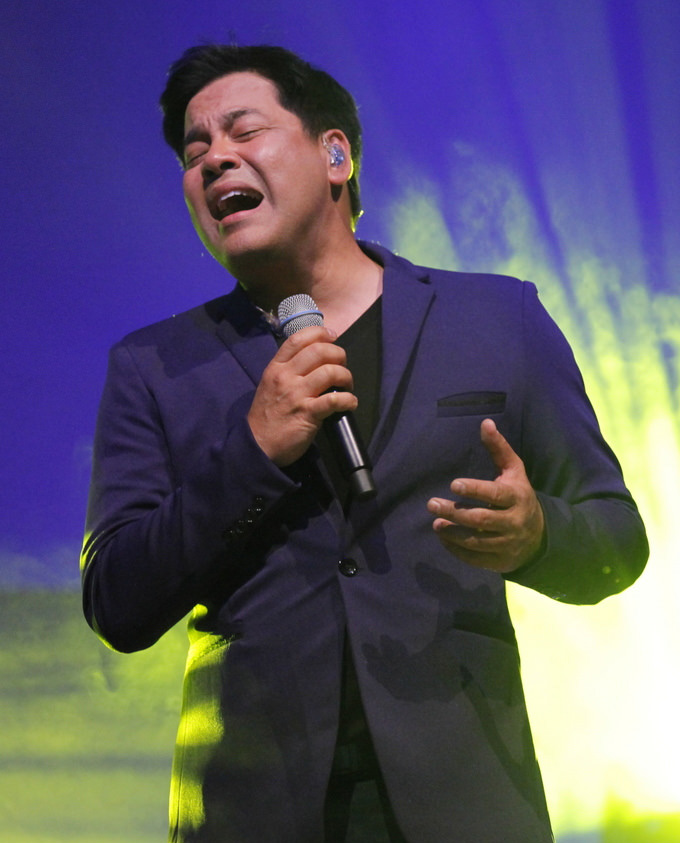
Martin Nievera, hosts of the variety show ASAP XP.

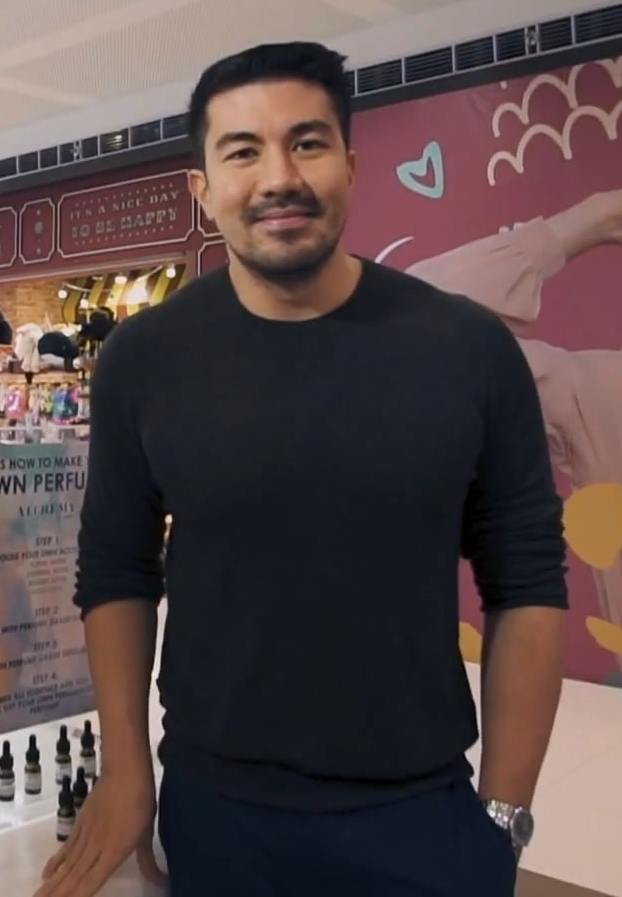
Luis Manzano, host of the game show Kapamilya Deal or No Deal.

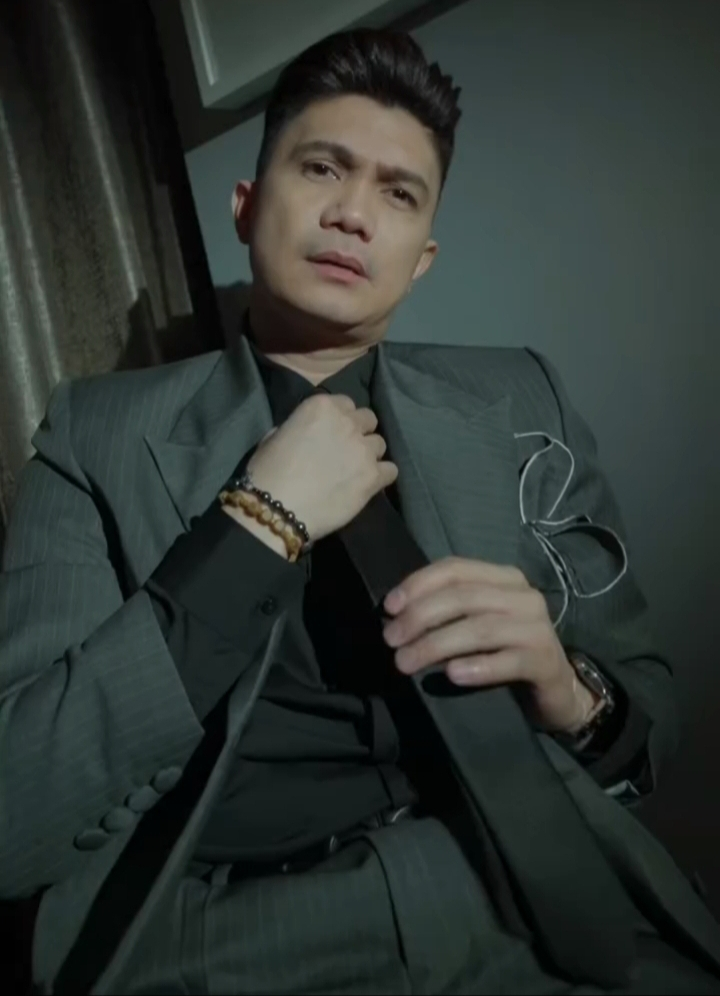
Vhong Navarro, host of the variety show It's Showtime.

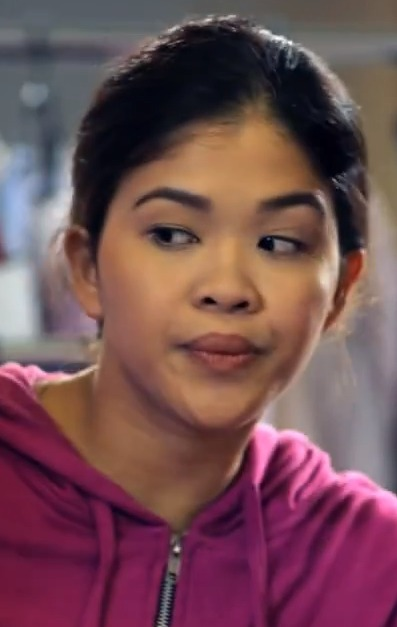
Melai Cantiveros, hosts of the talk show Kuan on One.

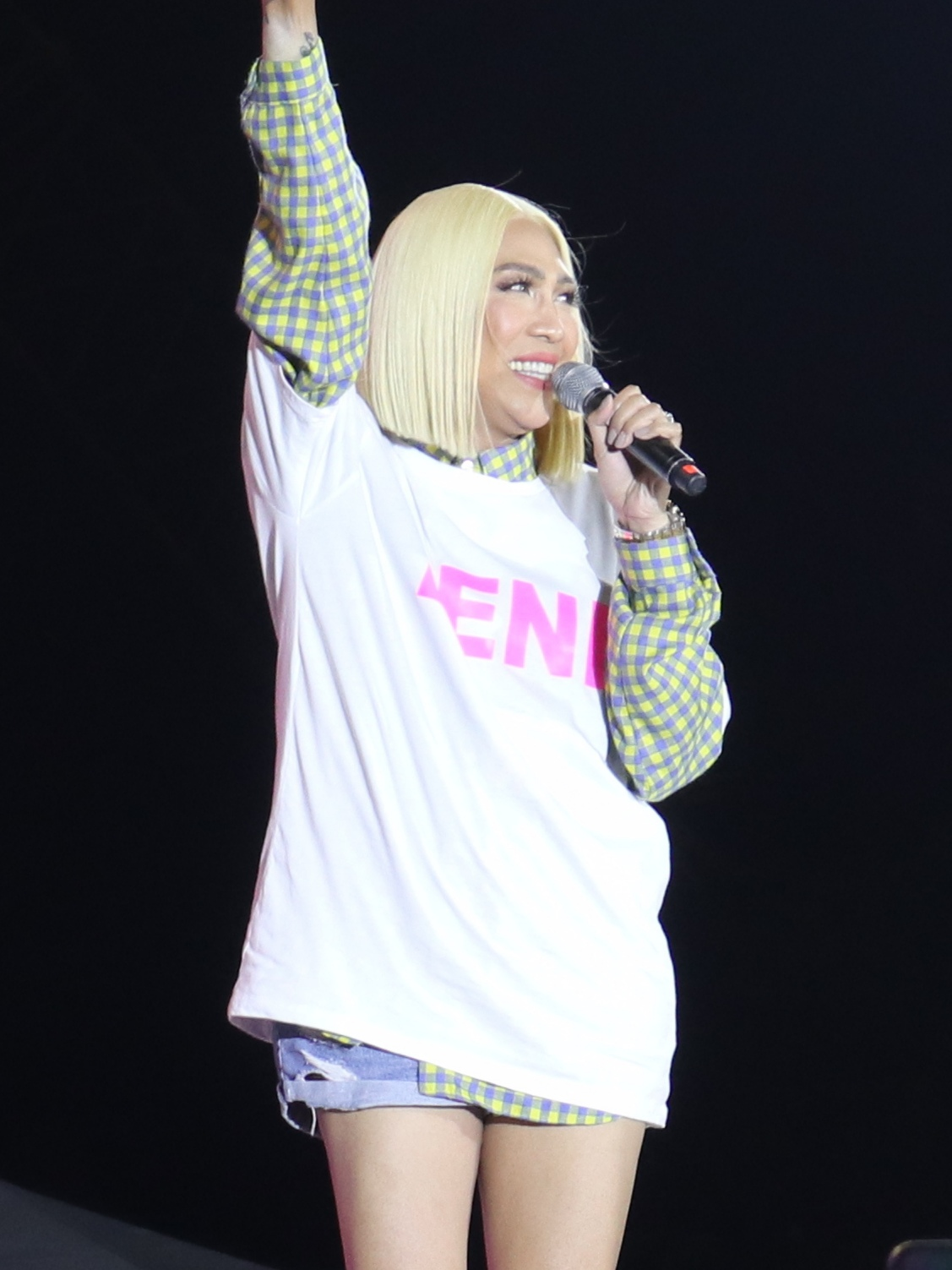
Vice Ganda, host of the variety show It's Showtime and the game show Everybody, Sing!.

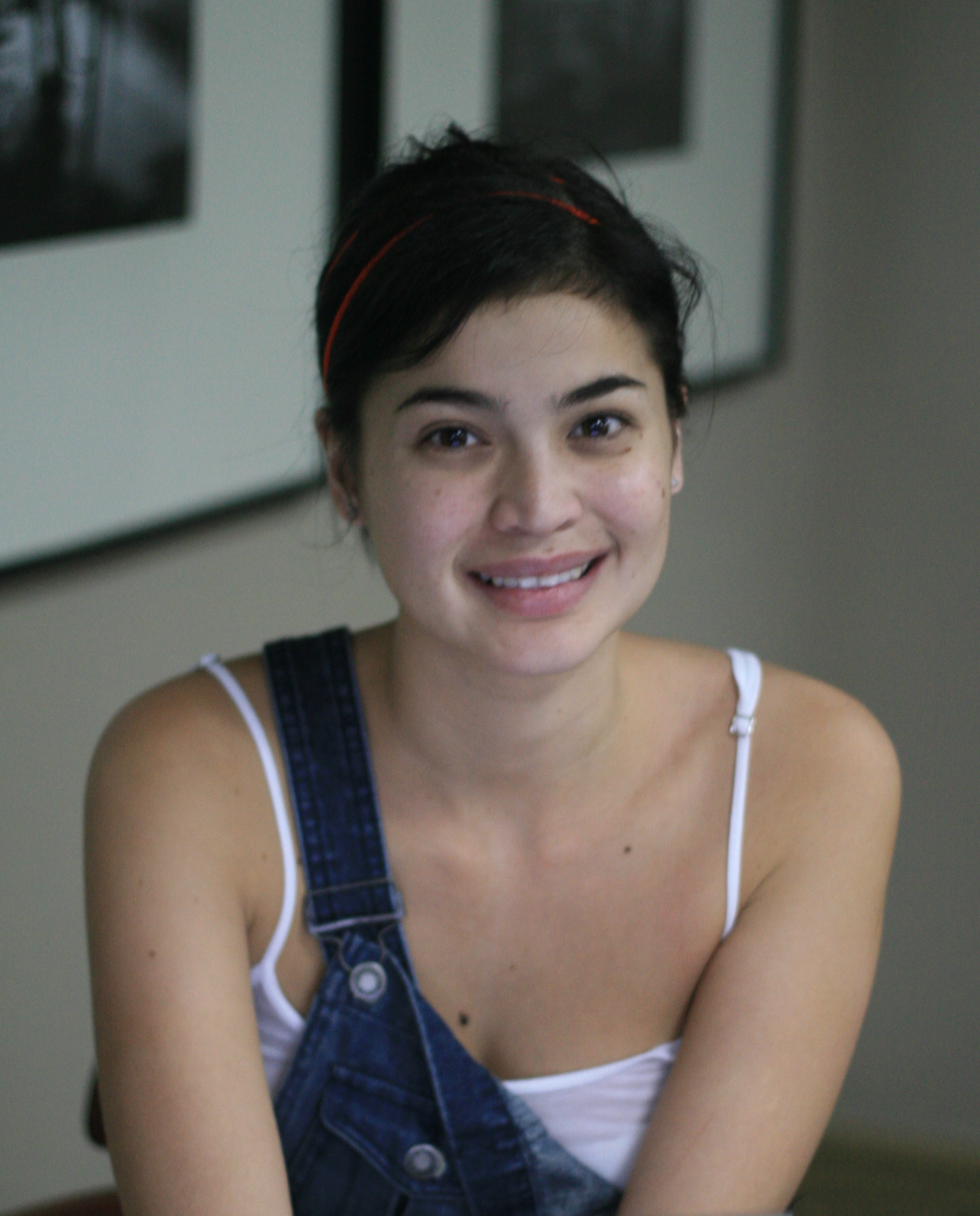
Anne Curtis, Host of the variety show It's Showtime

All TV is currently broadcasting twenty-three original programs.

=== ABS-CBN-produced programs ===
==== Drama ====
Title	Premiere
Sigabo	June 22, 2026
Someone, Someday	July 27, 2026
The Loyalty Game: Level Up	October 5, 2026
Maalaala Mo Kaya	April 26, 2025

==== Variety ====
Title	Premiere
It's Showtime	June 17, 2024
ASAP XP	January 4, 2026

==== Game ====
Title	Premiere
Kapamilya Deal or No Deal (season 6)	April 25, 2026

==== News ====
Title	Premiere
TV Patrol	April 15, 2024
TV Patrol Weekend	April 20, 2024
The World Tonight	January 2, 2026
News Patrol	January 3, 2026
TV Patrol Express	July 1, 2024

==== Documentary ====
Title	Premiere
Philippines' Most Haunted	October 25, 2026
Philippines' Oddest Jobs	September 5, 2026
S.O.C.O.: Scene of the Crime Operatives	January 17, 2026

==== Magazine ====
Title	Premiere
Rated Korina	June 29, 2025
Ibang Level 'To!	July 25, 2026

==== Informative ====
Title	Premiere
My Puhunan: Kaya Mo!	January 4, 2026

==== Religious ====
Title	Premiere
The Healing Eucharist	January 4, 2026
Kapamilya Daily Mass	January 2, 2026

=== Station-produced programs ===
==== Talk ====
Title	Premiere
Dapat Legal	July 11, 2026
Sagot ni Doc	July 11, 2026

==== News ====
Title	Premiere
All TV News Mabilis Lang 'To!	February 6, 2025

== Former original programming ==
=== Station-produced programs ===
==== Variety ====
- Wowowin (2022–23)

==== Talk ====
- Marites University (2024)
- Negosyo Goals (2023)
- M.O.M.S — Mhies on a Mission (2022–23)
- Toni (2022–23)
- Toni Talks (2022)

==== Public affairs ====
- Kuha All! (2022–24)

==== Music ====
- InstaJam (2022)
- K-Lite Radio TV (2022)

==== Informative ====
- Basta Enerhiya, Sagot Kita (2024–25)

=== ABS-CBN-produced programs ===
==== Drama ====
- FPJ's Batang Quiapo (2026)
- Blood vs Duty (2026)
- Miss Behave (2026)
- Roja (2026)
- The Alibi: Ang Buong Katotohanan (2026)
- What Lies Beneath (2026)

==== Comedy ====
- Goin' Bulilit (season 9) (2024)

==== Talk ====
- Magandang Buhay (2024–26)
- Kuan on One (2026)
- Oh My Gan! (2026)
- Y Speak 2.0 (2026)

==== Game ====
- Everybody, Sing! (season 4) (2026)
- Rainbow Rumble (season 2) (2025–26)
- Tubig to Handle: What the Fun (2026)

==== Reality ====
- Your Face Sounds Familiar (season 4) (2026)

==== Magazine ====
- Tao Po! (2026)

==== News ====
- TV Patrol Regional (2nd Incarnation) (2026)

==== Documentary ====
- Philippines' Most Shocking Stories (2026)

=== Others ===
- EZ Shop Asia (2022)

== Previously aired specials ==
- 13th PMPC Star Awards for Music (November 12, 2022)
- Manny Pacquiao vs. DK Yoo (December 11, 2022)
- Miss Earth 2022 (December 3, 2022)
- SONA 2023: Makalipas ang Isang Taon - The All TV News Special Coverage (July 24, 2023)
- 7th EDDYS Entertainment Editors' Choice Awards (July 7, 2024)
