= Puso ng Pasko: Artista Challenge =

2010 Philippine television reality show

- Title card
- Genre: Reality show
- Presented by: Richard Gutierrez; Vicky Morales; Rhian Ramos; Drew Arellano
- Country of origin: Philippines
- Original language: Tagalog
- No. of episodes: 20

Production
- Camera setup: Multiple-camera setup
- Running time: 30–45 minutes
- Production company: GMA News and Public Affairs

Original release
- Network: GMA Network
- Release: December 6 – December 31, 2010

Puso ng Pasko: Artista Challenge (transl. heart of Christmas: artist challenge) is a 2010 Philippine television reality show broadcast by GMA Network. Hosted by Richard Gutierrez, Vicky Morales, Rhian Ramos and Drew Arellano, it premiered on December 6, 2010. The show concluded on December 31, 2010, with a total of 20 episodes.

== Premise ==
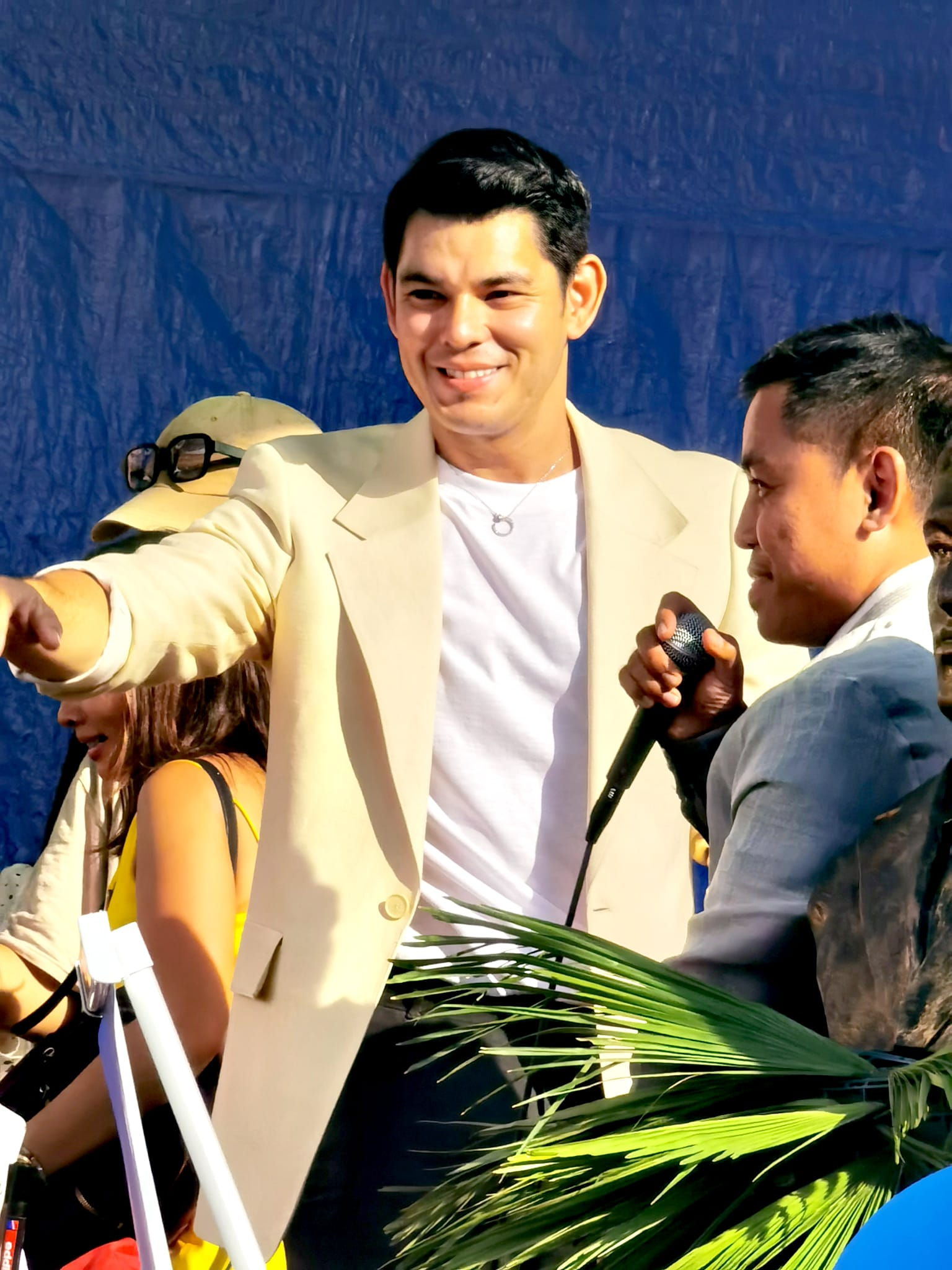
Richard Gutierrez served as a host.

The show features twelve groups of Kapuso celebrities, competing in various challenges, to win for the 12 families and communities (1 for each pair). Over 5 million Philippine pesos in cash, and prizes will be awarded to the 12 partner families.

== Challengers ==
Green team

- Carla Abellana and Geoff Eigenmann
- Paolo Contis and Sam Pinto
- Benjie Paras and Bubbles Paraiso
- Mariz Umali and Raffy Tima (winners)

Red team

- Jennica Garcia and Carl Guevarra
- Bianca King and Aljur Abrenica
- Heart Evangelista and Ervic Vijandre
- Rachelle Ann Go and Kris Lawrence

Blue team

- Kris Bernal and Rocco Nacino
- Gwen Zamora and Fabio Ide
- Ynna Asistio and Mark Herras
- Cesar Montano and Sunshine Cruz
