= Balitanghali =

Philippine television news show

- Title card since 2026
- Also known as: Balita Ko (Note: 2023.)
- Genre: News broadcasting
- Directed by: Weekdays; Jeannie Gualberto; Lirio Dayao; Ricky Patrimonio; Weekends; Mimi Yapchiongco
- Presented by: Pia Arcangel; Raffy Tima; Connie Sison
- Country of origin: Philippines
- Original language: Tagalog

Production
- Executive producers: Alwyn Alburo; Marielle Ventura; Ephraim Aguilar
- Production locations: Studio 5, GMA Network Center, Quezon City, Philippines
- Camera setup: Multiple-camera setup
- Running time: 45–90 minutes
- Production company: GMA News

Original release
- Network: QTV/Q (2005–11); GMA News TV (2011–21); GTV (since 2021)
- Release: November 11, 2005 – present

Balitanghali (formerly Balita Ko) is a Philippine television news broadcasting show broadcast by QTV/Q, GMA News TV and GTV. Originally anchored by Pia Arcangel and Raffy Tima, it premiered on November 11, 2005, on QTV. The show was carried over on GMA News TV on February 28, 2011, and on GTV on February 22, 2021. Tima and Connie Sison currently serve as the anchors.

== Overview ==
The show premiered on QTV on November 11, 2005, from Mondays to Saturdays. On February 7, 2010, it started airing on Sundays, leading to a weekend edition.

After Q ceased airing on February 20, 2011, the newscast was carried over on its replacement network, GMA News TV on February 28, 2011. On April 25, 2011, Grace Lee joined as the new host for the segment Star Bites. Lee left in 2012 and was replaced by Luane Dy. On November 10, 2014, Connie Sison replaced Pia Arcangel as an anchor.

On August 2, 2019, Jun Veneracion left Balitanghali Weekend, followed by Mariz Umali two days later. Veneracion and Umali were replaced by Mark Salazar and Mav Gonzales.

In March 2020, the production was temporarily halted due to the enhanced community quarantine in Luzon caused by the COVID-19 pandemic. The show resumed its programming on September 21, 2020. In February 2021, GMA News TV was rebranded as GTV, with the show being carried over to the said network.

On September 4, 2023, the show was renamed as Balita Ko. On November 13, 2023, the show returned to its original title, Balitanghali. On June 1, 2024, Regional TV News merged with the show and became a segment.

== Anchors ==
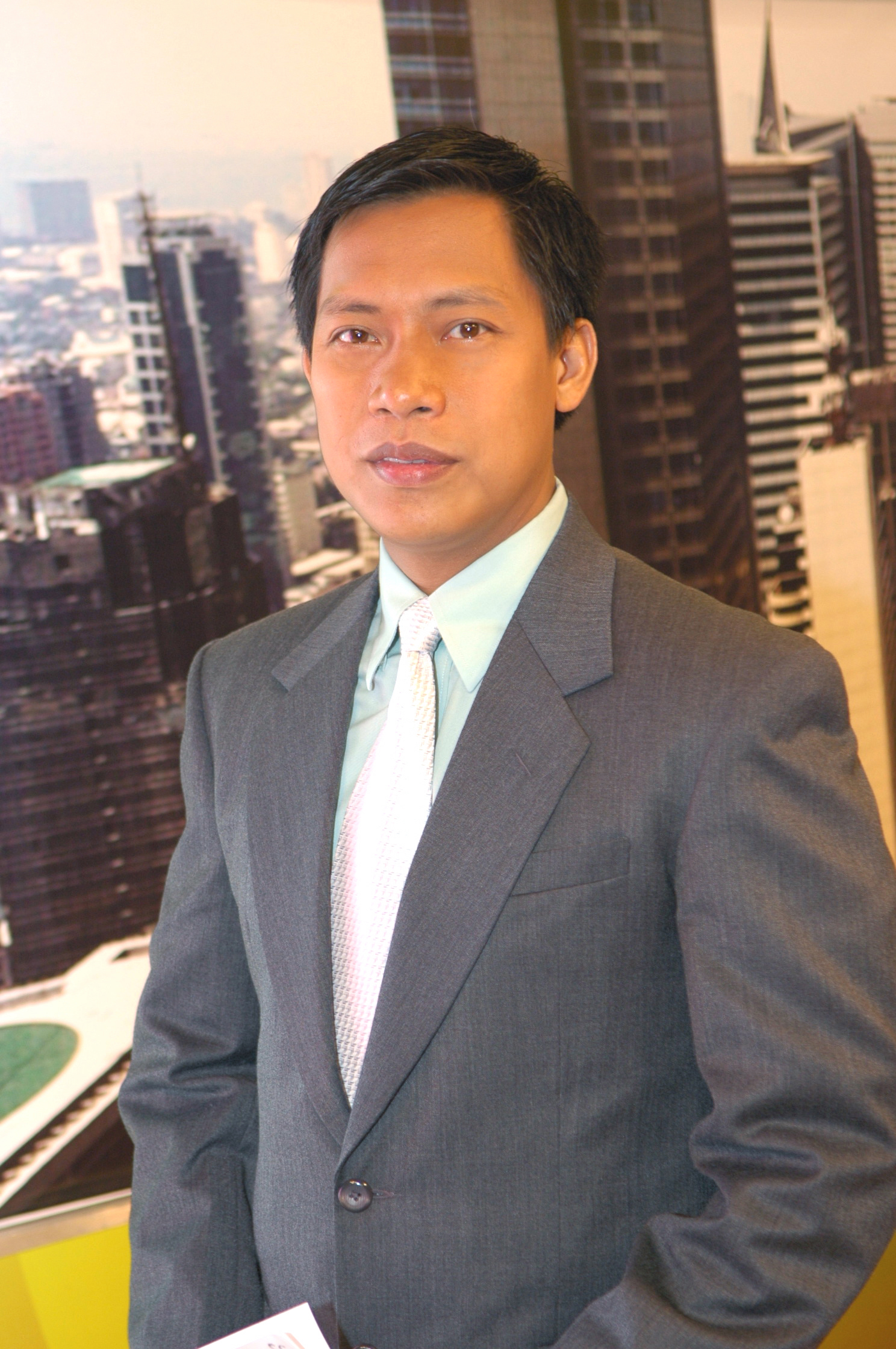
Raffy Tima serves as an anchor.

- Raffy Tima
- Connie Sison (since 2014)
- Aubrey Carampel (since 2023, Mare, Anong Latest?)
- Cris Zuñiga (since 2024, Regional TV News)
- Cecille Quibod-Castro (since 2024, Regional TV News)
- Sarah Hilomen-Velasco (since 2024, Regional TV News)

Interim anchors

- Oscar Oida (2024)
- Susan Enriquez (2025)

Former anchors

- Pia Arcangel (2005–14)
- Jun Veneracion (2010–19; weekend edition)
- Mariz Umali (2010–19; weekend edition)
- Grace Lee (2011–12; Star Bites)
- Luane Dy (2012–17; Star Bites)
- Nelson Canlas (2017–18; Star Bites)
- Athena Imperial (2018–20; Star Bites and Globalita)
- Cata Tibayan (2017–18; Star Bites)
- Mark Salazar (2019–20; weekend edition)
- Mav Gonzales (2019–20; weekend edition)
- Katrina Son (2023–24, GMA Integrated News Weather Center)
- Susan Enriquez (2023, Susan, Patulong Naman!)
- Boy Logro (2023, Tsibugan Na)

== Accolades ==
Accolades received by Balitanghali
Year	Award	Category	Recipient	Result	Ref.
2006	20th PMPC Star Awards for Television	Best Female Newscaster	Pia Arcangel	Nominated	
2008	22nd PMPC Star Awards for Television	Best News Program	Balitanghali	Nominated	
2009	Anak TV Seal Awards	Most Well-Liked TV Program	Balitanghali	Included	
2009	1st MTRCB TV Awards	Best News Program	Balitanghali	Won	
2009	23rd PMPC Star Awards for Television	Best News Program	Balitanghali	Nominated	
2011	Golden Screen TV Awards	Outstanding Female News Presenter	Pia Arcangel	Nominated	
2012	26th PMPC Star Awards for Television	Best Female Newscaster	Pia Arcangel	Nominated	
2012	26th PMPC Star Awards for Television	Best Male Newscaster	Raffy Tima	Nominated	
2012	26th PMPC Star Awards for Television	Best News Program	Balitanghali	Nominated	
2013	Golden Screen TV Awards	Outstanding News Program	Balitanghali	Nominated	
2013	Golden Screen TV Awards	Outstanding Male News Presenter	Raffy Tima	Nominated	
2013	Golden Screen TV Awards	Outstanding Female News Presenter	Pia Archangel	Nominated	
2013	27th PMPC Star Awards for Television	Best Male Newscaster	Raffy Tima	Nominated	
2013	27th PMPC Star Awards for Television	Best News Program	Balitanghali	Nominated	
2014	Golden Screen TV Awards	Outstanding Male News Presenter	Raffy Tima	Nominated	
2014	Golden Screen TV Awards	Outstanding Female News Presenter	Pia Arcangel	Nominated	
2014	28th PMPC Star Awards for Television	Outstanding Female News Presenter	Pia Arcangel	Nominated	
2014	28th PMPC Star Awards for Television	Best News Program	Balitanghali	Nominated	
2015	29th PMPC Star Awards for Television	Best News Program	Balitanghali	Nominated	
2016	30th PMPC Star Awards for Television	Best News Program	Balitanghali	Nominated	
2017	31st PMPC Star Awards for Television	Best Male Newscaster	Raffy Tima	Nominated	
2018	32nd PMPC Star Awards for Television	Best Male Newscaster	Raffy Tima	Won	
2018	32nd PMPC Star Awards for Television	Best News Program	Balitanghali	Nominated	
2019	33rd PMPC Star Awards for Television	Best Male Newscaster	Raffy Tima	Won	
2019	33rd PMPC Star Awards for Television	Best News Program	Balitanghali	Nominated	
2020	42nd Catholic Mass Media Awards	Best Special Event Coverage	"January 13, Taal Volcano coverage"	Won	
2021	34th PMPC Star Awards for Television	Best Male Newcaster	Raffy Tima	Nominated	
2021	34th PMPC Star Awards for Television	Best News Program	Balitanghali	Nominated	
2023	35th PMPC Star Awards for Television	Best Female Newcaster	Connie Sison	Nominated	
2023	35th PMPC Star Awards for Television	Best Male Newcaster	Raffy Tima	Nominated	
2023	35th PMPC Star Awards for Television	Best News Program	Balitanghali	Nominated	
2025	38th PMPC Star Awards for Television	Best News Program Host	Raffy Tima	Nominated	
2025	37th PMPC Star Awards for Television	Best News Program	Balitanghali	Nominated	
2025	37th PMPC Star Awards for Television	Best Male Newscaster	Raffy Tima	Nominated	
