= S.O.C.O.: Scene of the Crime Operatives =

Philippine investigative docudrama television program

- Genre: Crime; Investigative news Docudrama
- Developed by: ABS-CBN News and Current Affairs
- Directed by: JV Noriega
- Presented by: Gus Abelgas
- Narrated by: Gus Abelgas
- Country of origin: Philippines
- Original language: Filipino
- No. of seasons: 4
- No. of episodes: 765

Production
- Executive producers: Carlo Katigbak; Cory Vidanes; Jaime Lopez; Francis Toral
- Producer: Ferdinand Enriquez
- Editors: Edwin Hidalgo; Joanas Pineda; Joemar Sarabia
- Production company: ABS-CBN News and Current Affairs

Original release
- Network: ABS-CBN
- Release: November 23, 2005 – May 2, 2020
- Network: Kapamilya Channel
- Release: June 13 – October 17, 2020
- Release: January 17, 2026 – present
- Network: iWant
- Release: October 24, 2025 – present
- Network: A2Z; All TV
- Release: January 17, 2026 – present

Related
- Gus Abelgas: Nag-Uulat; True Crime; Private I Gus Abelgas Forensics (One PH)

S.O.C.O.: Scene of the Crime Operatives (also known as SOCO) is a Philippine television investigative docudrama show broadcast by ABS-CBN, iWant and Kapamilya Channel. Hosted by Gus Abelgas, it aired from November 23, 2005, to October 17, 2020. The show returned since October 24, 2025. The program primarily aims to find answers to serious crimes with the help of forensic investigators and the local police.

== Overview ==
The program was launched on November 23, 2005 replacing Private I and originally aired on Wednesday late nights before it was eventually transferred to Thursday late nights in August 2006. before it was eventually transferred to Friday late nights in March 2009. before it was eventually transferred to Saturday afternoons in July 2012.

On March 21 to May 2, 2020, S.O.C.O. was temporarily suspended when it temporarily stopped airing new episodes due to the quarantine caused by the COVID-19 pandemic and ABS-CBN stopped its free-to-air broadcast operations as ordered by the National Telecommunications Commission (NTC) due to the lapsing of the network's legislative franchise. As a result, the program released new episodes through its social media accounts.

The program returned via thru online with new episodes and pay television network Kapamilya Channel from June 13 to October 17, 2020, to give way to the third season of I Can See Your Voice.

S.O.C.O. was also aired on DZMM TeleRadyo initially as first-run from September 8, 2011 to July 6, 2012, every Thursday at 9:15 PM. The program returned to DZMM TeleRadyo as a rerun of its previous episodes, which airs every Thursday at 2:00 PM and Friday at 1:00 AM from April 20, 2017 to April 29, 2020. Also moved to TeleRadyo from May 13 to August 28, 2020, every Wednesday at 1:00 PM (later moved to Friday on August 7, 2020).

On October 24, 2025, the show was revived for its second incarnation and as a limited docuseries for iWant after five years of hiatus, with Gus Abelgas returning as host. On January 17, 2026, the show began its TV broadcast on A2Z, All TV and Kapamilya Channel after almost 6 years due to the ABS-CBN shutdown, thus marking the return of this program to channels 2 and 16 in Mega Manila and regional channels previously held by ABS-CBN until 2020. This occurred just a year and 8 months after ABS-CBN Corporation and Advanced Media Broadcasting System (AMBS) signed content agreements to air ABS-CBN programs on the said channel.

== Radio program ==
S.O.C.O. sa DZMM also airs every Saturdays at 7:45 PM to 8:30 PM on DZMM Radyo Patrol 630 and DZMM TeleRadyo. During the program's first incarnation from 2005 to 2020, it was anchored by Gus Abelgas and David Oro. On March 7, 2026, the show returned to DZMM, with Abelgas and Jessie Cruzat (replacing Oro) as the current anchors of this iteration.

== Accolades ==
Accolades received by S.O.C.O.
Year	Award	Category	Recipient / Nominated work	Result	Ref.
2006	20th PMPC Star Awards for Television	Best Public Service Program	S.O.C.O.	Nominated	
2006	20th PMPC Star Awards for Television	Best Public Service Program Host	Gus Abelgas	Nominated	
2007	21st PMPC Star Awards for Television	Best Public Service Program	S.O.C.O.	Nominated	
2007	21st PMPC Star Awards for Television	Best Public Service Program Host	Gus Abelgas	Nominated	
2008	22nd PMPC Star Awards for Television	Best Public Service Program	S.O.C.O.	Nominated	
2011	25th PMPC Star Awards for Television	Best Documentary Program	S.O.C.O.	Nominated	
2011	2nd Golden Screen TV Awards	Outstanding Crime/Investigative Program	S.O.C.O.: Cainta Massacre	Nominated	
2011	2nd Golden Screen TV Awards	Outstanding Crime/Investigative Program Host	Gus Abelgas	Nominated	
2012	26th PMPC Star Awards for Television	Best Documentary Program	S.O.C.O.	Nominated	
2012	26th PMPC Star Awards for Television	Best Documentary Program Host	Gus Abelgas	Nominated	
2013	27th PMPC Star Awards for Television	Best Documentary Program	S.O.C.O.	Nominated	
2013	27th PMPC Star Awards for Television	Best Documentary Program Host	Gus Abelgas	Nominated	
2013	11th Gawad Tanglaw Awards	Best Investigative Program	S.O.C.O.	Won	
2013	4th Golden Screen TV Awards	Outstanding Crime/Investigative Program	S.O.C.O.	Nominated	
2013	4th Golden Screen TV Awards	Outstanding Crime/Investigative Program Host	Gus Abelgas	Nominated	
2014	22nd KBP Golden Dove Awards	Best TV Public Affairs Program	S.O.C.O.	Won	
2014	28th PMPC Star Awards for Television	Best Public Service Program	S.O.C.O.	Nominated	
2014	28th PMPC Star Awards for Television	Best Public Service Program Host	Gus Abelgas	Nominated	
2014	12th Gawad Tanglaw Awards	Best Investigative Program	S.O.C.O.	Won	
2014	5th Golden Screen TV Awards	Outstanding Crime/Investigative Program	S.O.C.O.: Hustisya	Won	
2014	1st PUP Mabini Media Awards	Best Television Public Affairs Program	S.O.C.O.	Won	
2014	Philippine Public and Safety and Order Support Group	Most Appreciated Safety and Crime Prevention TV Program in the Country	S.O.C.O.	Won	
2015	29th PMPC Star Awards for Television	Best Public Service Program	S.O.C.O.	Nominated	
2015	29th PMPC Star Awards for Television	Best Public Service Program Host	Gus Abelgas	Nominated	
2015	13th Gawad Tanglaw Awards	Best Investigative Program	S.O.C.O.	Won	
2015	6th Golden Screen TV Awards	Outstanding Crime/Investigative Program	S.O.C.O.	Nominated	
2015	6th Golden Screen TV Awards	Outstanding Crime/Investigative Program Host	Gus Abelgas	Nominated	
2016	30th PMPC Star Awards for Television	Best Public Service Program	S.O.C.O.	Nominated	
2016	30th PMPC Star Awards for Television	Best Public Service Program Host	Gus Abelgas	Nominated	
2016	14th Gawad Tanglaw Awards	Best Investigative Program	S.O.C.O.	Won	
2017	31st PMPC Star Awards for Television	Best Public Service Program	S.O.C.O.	Nominated	
2017	31st PMPC Star Awards for Television	Best Public Service Program Host	Gus Abelgas	Nominated	
2018	32nd PMPC Star Awards for Television	Best Public Service Program Host	Gus Abelgas	Nominated	
2018	1st Dangal ng Bayan Media Excellence Awards	Media Excellence Award for Criminology	S.O.C.O.	Won	
2019	33rd PMPC Star Awards for Television	Best Public Service Program	S.O.C.O.	Nominated	
2019	33rd PMPC Star Awards for Television	Best Public Service Program Host	Gus Abelgas	Nominated	
2019	2nd Dangal ng Bayan Media Excellence Awards	Media Excellence Award for Criminology	S.O.C.O.	Won	
2020	3rd Gawad Lasallianeta	Most Outstanding Public Affairs Show	S.O.C.O.	Won	
2020	3rd Gawad Lasallianeta	Most Outstanding Public Affairs Show Host	Gus Abelgas	Won	

== See also ==
- List of programs broadcast by ABS-CBN
- List of A2Z original programming
- List of All TV original programming
