= Out of Control (2013 TV program) =

Philippine television documentary show

- Title card
- Genre: Documentary
- Presented by: Mariz Umali; Rocco Nacino
- Country of origin: Philippines
- Original language: Tagalog
- No. of episodes: 8

Production
- Camera setup: Multiple-camera setup
- Running time: 45 minutes
- Production company: GMA News and Public Affairs

Original release
- Network: GMA Network
- Release: November 23, 2013 – January 18, 2014

Out of Control is a Philippine television documentary show broadcast by GMA Network. Hosted by Mariz Umali and Rocco Nacino, it premiered on November 23, 2013 on the network's Sabado Star Power sa Hapon line up. The show concluded on January 18, 2014, with a total of eight episodes.

== Ratings ==
According to AGB Nielsen Philippines' Mega Manila household television ratings, the pilot episode of Out of Control earned a 10.8% rating. The final episode scored a 7.1% rating.
