= Wish Ko Lang! =

Philippine television drama series

- Title card in 2025 and 2026
- Genre: Public broadcasting; Drama
- Presented by: Bernadette Sembrano; Vicky Morales
- Opening theme: "Handog" by Kyla; "Walang Imposible" by Jolina Magdangal; "Wish Ko Lang" by Aicelle Santos and Maricris Garcia
- Country of origin: Philippines
- Original language: Tagalog

Production
- Camera setup: Multiple-camera setup
- Running time: 45 minutes
- Production company: GMA Public Affairs

Original release
- Network: GMA Network
- Release: June 29, 2002 – present

Wish Ko Lang! (transl. just my wish!) is a Philippine television public service drama anthology series broadcast by GMA Network. Originally hosted by Bernadette Sembrano, it premiered on June 29, 2002 on the network's Saturday afternoon line up. The series concluded on February 15, 2020 with a total of 983 episodes. The series returned on July 11, 2020. Vicky Morales currently serves as the host.

The series is streaming online on YouTube. It is currently in a hiatus.

== Hosts ==
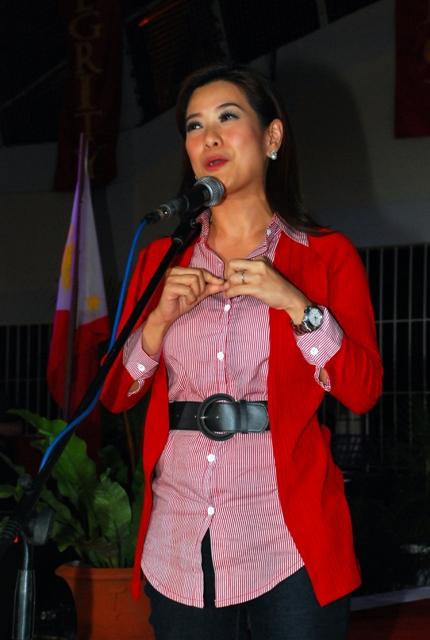
Bernadette Sembrano served as a host.

- Bernadette Sembrano (2002–04)
- Vicky Morales (since 2004)

== Accolades ==
Accolades received by Wish Ko Lang!
Year	Award	Category	Recipient	Result	Ref.
2003	17th PMPC Star Awards for Television	Best Public Service Program	Wish Ko Lang!	Won	
2003	17th PMPC Star Awards for Television	Best Public Service Program Host	Bernadette Sembrano	Nominated	
2004	18th PMPC Star Awards for Television	Best Public Service Program	Wish Ko Lang!	Nominated	
2004	18th PMPC Star Awards for Television	Best Public Service Program Host	Vicky Morales	Won	
2006	20th PMPC Star Awards for Television	Best Public Service Program	Wish Ko Lang!	Won	
2006	20th PMPC Star Awards for Television	Best Public Service Program Host	Vicky Morales	Nominated	
2007	Anak TV Seal Awards	Top 10 Most Well-Liked TV Programs	Wish Ko Lang!	Included	
2007	Catholic Mass Media Awards	Best Public Service Program	Wish Ko Lang!	Won	
2007	21st PMPC Star Awards for Television	Best Public Service Program	Wish Ko Lang!	Nominated	
2007	21st PMPC Star Awards for Television	Best Public Service Program Host	Vicky Morales	Won	
2008	Catholic Mass Media Awards	Best Public Service Program	Wish Ko Lang!	Won	
2008	22nd PMPC Star Awards for Television	Best Public Service Program	Wish Ko Lang!	Nominated	
2008	22nd PMPC Star Awards for Television	Best Public Service Program Host	Vicky Morales	Nominated	
2009	Anak TV Seal Awards	Most Well-Liked TV Program	Wish Ko Lang!	Included	
2009	7th Gawad Tanglaw	Best Public Service Program	Wish Ko Lang!	Won	
2009	23rd PMPC Star Awards for Television	Best Public Service Program	Wish Ko Lang!	Nominated	
2009	23rd PMPC Star Awards for Television	Best Public Service Program Host	Vicky Morales	Nominated	
2010	24th PMPC Star Awards for Television	Best Public Service Program	Wish Ko Lang!	Nominated	
2010	24th PMPC Star Awards for Television	Best Public Service Program Host	Vicky Morales	Won	
2011	8th Golden Screen TV Awards	Outstanding Public Service Program	Wish Ko Lang!	Won	
2011	8th Golden Screen TV Awards	Outstanding Public Service Program Host	Vicky Morales	Won	
2011	9th Gawad Tanglaw	Best Public Service Program	Wish Ko Lang!	Won	
2011	25th PMPC Star Awards for Television	Best Public Service Program	Wish Ko Lang!	Nominated	
2011	25th PMPC Star Awards for Television	Best Public Service Program Host	Vicky Morales	Nominated	
2012	26th PMPC Star Awards for Television	Best Public Service Program	Wish Ko Lang!	Won	
2012	26th PMPC Star Awards for Television	Best Public Service Program Host	Vicky Morales	Nominated	
2012	8th USTV Awards	Best Public Service Program	Wish Ko Lang!	Won	
2013	10th Golden Screen TV Awards	Outstanding Public Service Program	Wish Ko Lang!	Won	
2013	10th Golden Screen TV Awards	Outstanding Public Affairs Program Host	Vicky Morales	Won	
2013	4th Northwest Samar State University Students Choice Awards	Best Public Service Program	Wish Ko Lang!	Won	
2013	4th Northwest Samar State University Students Choice Awards	Best Public Service Program Host	Vicky Morales	Won	
2013	27th PMPC Star Awards for Television	Best Public Service Program	Wish Ko Lang!	Nominated	
2013	27th PMPC Star Awards for Television	Best Public Service Program Host	Vicky Morales	Won	
2013	7th UPLB Isko’t Iska’s Broadcast Choice Awards	Best Public Service Program	Wish Ko Lang!	Won	
2013	7th UPLB Isko’t Iska’s Broadcast Choice Awards	Best Public Service Program Host	Vicky Morales	Won	
2014	Golden Screen TV Awards	Outstanding Public Service Program	"Ang Mundo ni Yvette"	Won	
2014	Golden Screen TV Awards	Outstanding Public Service Program Host	Vicky Morales	Won	
2014	28th PMPC Star Awards for Television	Best Public Service Program	Wish Ko Lang!	Nominated	
2014	28th PMPC Star Awards for Television	Best Public Service Program Host	Vicky Morales	Won	
2015	29th PMPC Star Awards for Television	Best Public Service Program	Wish Ko Lang!	Nominated	
2015	29th PMPC Star Awards for Television	Best Public Service Program Host	Vicky Morales	Won	
2016	30th PMPC Star Awards for Television	Best Public Service Program	Wish Ko Lang!	Nominated	
2016	30th PMPC Star Awards for Television	Best Public Service Program Host	Vicky Morales	Nominated	
2017	8th Northwest Samar State University Students' Choice Awards for Radio and Television Awards	Best Public Service Program	Wish Ko Lang!	Won	
2017	31st PMPC Star Awards for Television	Best Public Service Program	Wish Ko Lang!	Nominated	
2017	31st PMPC Star Awards for Television	Best Public Service Program Host	Vicky Morales	Won	
2018	32nd PMPC Star Awards for Television	Best Public Service Program	Wish Ko Lang!	Nominated	
2018	32nd PMPC Star Awards for Television	Best Public Service Program Host	Vicky Morales	Won	
2019	Anak TV Seal Awards		Wish Ko Lang!	Won	
2019	33rd PMPC Star Awards for Television	Best Public Service Program	Wish Ko Lang!	Nominated	
2019	33rd PMPC Star Awards for Television	Best Public Service Program Host	Vicky Morales	Nominated	
2021	34th PMPC Star Awards for Television	Best Public Service Program	Wish Ko Lang!	Nominated	
2021	34th PMPC Star Awards for Television	Best Public Service Program Host	Vicky Morales	Nominated	
2023	35th PMPC Star Awards for Television	Best New Male TV Personality	Shido Roxas ("Mr. Right")	Nominated	
2023	35th PMPC Star Awards for Television	Best Public Service Program	Wish Ko Lang!	Won	
2023	35th PMPC Star Awards for Television	Best Public Service Program Host	Vicky Morales	Nominated	
2025	37th PMPC Star Awards for Television	Best Public Service Program	Wish Ko Lang!	Nominated	
2025	37th PMPC Star Awards for Television	Best Public Service Program Host	Vicky Morales	Nominated	
2025	38th PMPC Star Awards for Television	Best Public Service Program	Wish Ko Lang!	Won	
2025	38th PMPC Star Awards for Television	Best Public Service Program Host	Vicky Morales	Nominated	
