= Ilaban Natin Yan! =

2020 Philippine television talk show

- Title card
- Genre: Tabloid talk show
- Created by: Jaileen Jimeno
- Written by: Erwin Caezar Bravo
- Directed by: Monti Puno Parungao; Armin Collado; Ralph Errald Manuel Malabunga
- Presented by: Vicky Morales
- Country of origin: Philippines
- Original language: Tagalog
- No. of episodes: 7

Production
- Executive producer: Robert John Oriondo
- Camera setup: Multiple-camera setup
- Running time: 45 minutes
- Production company: GMA News and Public Affairs

Original release
- Network: GMA Network
- Release: February 22 – April 4, 2020

Ilaban Natin 'Yan! (transl. let us fight that!) is a 2020 Philippine television dramatized tabloid talk show broadcast by GMA Network. Directed by Monti Puno Parungao, Armin Collado and Ralph Errald Manuel Malabunga, it is hosted by Vicky Morales. It premiered on February 22, 2020 on the network's Sabado Star Power sa Hapon line up. The show concluded on April 4, 2020, with a total of seven episodes.

== Production ==
In March 2020, principal photography was halted due to the enhanced community quarantine in Luzon caused by the COVID-19 pandemic.
