= Raffy Tima =

Filipino journalist, producer and presenter (born 1975)

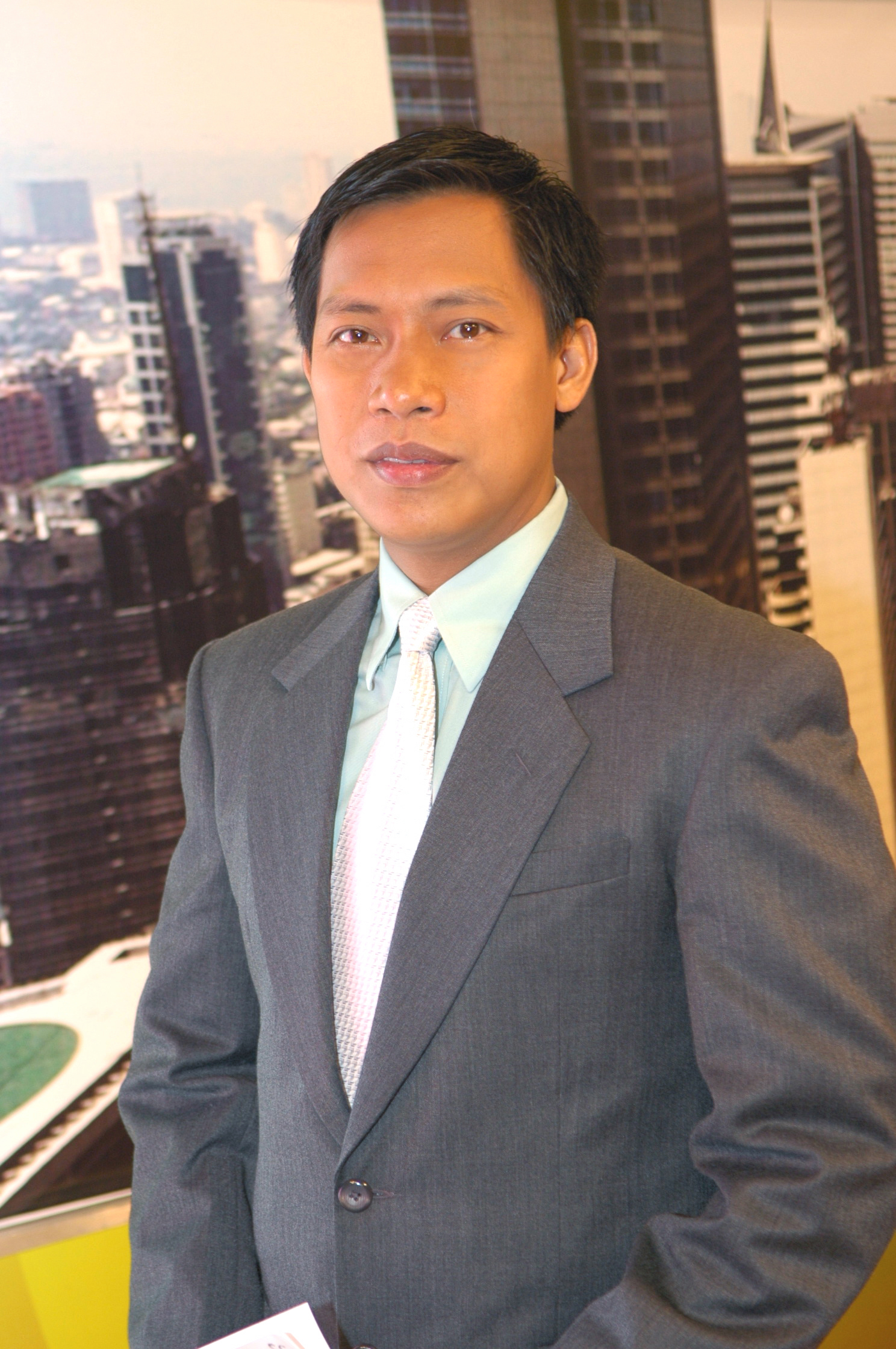
- Tima on the set of Balitanghali
- Born: Rufino Dompao Tima Jr. January 7, 1975 (age 51); Tabuk, Kalinga, Philippines
- Education: Trinity University of Asia, (BA)
- Occupations: Journalist, presenter, producer and director
- Years active: 1998–present
- Agents: IBC News and Public Affairs (1998); GMA Integrated News and Public Affairs (1998–present)
- Television: Balitanghali; 100% Pinoy! I-Witness
- Height: 5 ft 8 in (1.73 m)
- Spouse: Mariz Umali (m. 2012)

Rufino Dompao Tima Jr. (Tagalog: [ˈɾafi ˈtimɐ]; born January 7, 1975), better known as Raffy Tima, is a Filipino journalist, producer and presenter. He is currently working in GMA Network and its affiliate, GMA News TV (now GTV), he spanned over 23 years since the working of his current network.

== Early life ==
Raffy Tima was born as Rufino Dompao Tima Jr. on January 7, 1975, in Tabuk, Kalinga. He moved in Pasig and Quezon City for focused on news television after graduated in college. He finished the secondary education in San Marcelino High School, and his tertiary education in UP Diliman from 1st year to 2nd year, but he transferred to Trinity University of Asia from 3rd year until his graduation, with Bachelor of Arts in Mass Communication.

== Career ==
Before his joining IBC and GMA News, he was a voice-over for the Philippine variety show, That's Entertainment.

Tima was one of GMA Network's main reporters during the 2000 to 2004 series of kidnappings by the Abu Sayyaf Group, an Islamic extremist group in southern Mindanao, and the all-out war waged by the Armed Forces of the Philippines against the Islamic separatist Moro Islamic Liberation Front in Central Mindanao. Tima has also covered the War in Afghanistan in 2001 and Iraq in 2004.

A recipient of numerous commendations including most outstanding news producer in 2004 for his coverage of that year's general elections, Tima is currently a senior producer for GMA Integrated News, an anchor on GMA News TV (now GTV)'s noontime programme Balitanghali (then Balita Ko) with Pia Arcangel (now Connie Sison), and presenter on the public affairs show, 100% Pinoy!. He is likewise one of the first presenters of Reporter's Notebook as well as on i-Witness, which won the Peabody Award.

== Portrayals in media ==
Tima was featured in an episode of GMA News TV's drama anthology Wagas on August 9, 2014, before the proposal of set from Amaya. JC Tiuseco starred the role of Tima.

== Personal life ==
Tima married to fellow GMA News Reporter Mariz Umali on December 8, 2012 at Santuario del Santo Cristo in San Juan City. On January 1, 2012, Tima had proposed to Umali at a New Year's party following two years as a couple. According to the story of television drama series, Wagas, Tima was on the set of epic fantaserye Amaya before proposing to her. At the Easter Vigil on Black Saturday 2025, Tima was received into the Catholic Church at Sacred Heart Parish-Shrine in Kamuníng, Quezon City, where his wife is a lector.

== Filmography ==
Year	Title	Role	Notes	Refs.
1998	Headline Trese	Himself / News reporter		
1998	IBC Express Balita	Himself / News reporter		
1998–present	Saksi	Himself / Alternate/Substitute anchor / Field reporter		
2004–present	24 Oras	Himself / Alternate/Substitute anchor / Field reporter		
2004–2010	I-Witness	Himself / Hosts		
2005–2023; 2023–present	Balitanghali	Anchor	Permanent with Pia Arcangel (now Connie Sison)	
2006–2007	100% Pinoy!	Hosts		
2010	Puso ng Pasko: Artista Challenge	Himself / Contestant	Game partner with Mariz Umali; TV special (winner)	
2011	I-Witness	Himself / Episode host	Episode: "Inside Cambodia"	
2011–present	State of the Nation (formerly State of the Nation with Jessica Soho)	Himself / Substitute anchor / Field reporter		
2011–present	News Live (formerly News TV Live)	Himself / Self-anchor		
2012	Travel: More Fun in the Philippines	Himself	(with Mariz Umali)	
2012	Follow That Star	Himself	Featuring the wedding proposal to Mariz Umali and he was set of epic fantaserye Amaya (as a segment of Follow That Reporter)	
2013	Tonight with Arnold Clavio	Himself / Guest	(with Mariz Umali); TV special (for Valentine's Day)	
2014	Wagas	Himself	(with Mariz Umali)	
2017	The Lolas' Beautiful Show	Himself / Guest	(with Mariz Umali)	
2017	Sunday PinaSaya	Himself / Guest player		
2017	Eat Bulaga!	Himself / Guest player	(as a segment of Jackpot en Poy)	
2018	Eat Bulaga!	Himself / Guest player	(as a segment of Guhit Bulaga Plus)	
2018	24 Oras Weekend	Himself / Relief anchor	He replaced Jiggy Manicad for senatorial race (now replaced by Ivan Mayrina)	
2019	I-Witness	Himself / Episode host	Episode: "Bawat Patak ng Ulan" (replay episode on October 30, 2020, on GMA News TV and August 28, 2021, on GMA Network)	
2019	Pamana: Saving Our Heritage	Himself / Host	Episode: "Ilocos Sur"	
2020	24 Oras: News Alert	Himself / Self-Anchor		
2020	I-Witness	Himself / Episode host	Episode: "Pinoy Frontliners"	
2021	Unang Hirit	Himself / Guest	(together with Mariz Umali) (as a segment of Hula Hula Who?)	
2021	Eat Bulaga!	Himself / Celebrity judge	(as a segment of Bawal Judgmental)	
2021	Tunay na Buhay	Himself / Guest	(with Mariz Umali)	
2021	Eat Bulaga!	Himself / Choices	(as a segment of Bawal Judgmental)	
2023	Family Feud	Himself / Guest player	(with Ivan Mayrina, Jun Veneracion and Oscar Oida)	
2023	Balita Ko	Anchor	Permanent with Connie Sison	
2023	Fast Talk with Boy Abunda	Himself	with Susan Enriquez and Joel Reyes Zobel	
2024	Fast Talk with Boy Abunda	Himself	(with Mariz Umali)	
2025	Lutong Bahay	Himself	(with Mariz Umali)	
2025	Biyaheng Totoo: Sana sa Eleksyon 2025 (Part 2)	Himself / Narration	Episode: "Magandang Trabaho at Kabuhayan"	
