= Gus Abelgas =

Filipino journalist (born 1962)

- Born: Augusto Abelgas; October 22, 1962 (age 63)
- Occupation: Journalist
- Years active: 1987–2020; 2023–present
- Notable work: S.O.C.O.: Scene of the Crime Operatives; Gus Abelgas Forensics
- Spouse: Jo Lising (died 2024)
- Children: 2

Augusto "Gus" Abelgas (Tagalog: [gas ʔabɛlˈgas]; born October 22, 1962) is a Filipino broadcast journalist known for his work in S.O.C.O.: Scene of the Crime Operatives and Gus Abelgas Forensics.

== Early life and education ==
Augusto Abelgas was born on October 22, 1962, to a poor family. His father worked as a driver and his mother worked as a laundry worker. Their family lived as informal settlers in San Andres, Manila during his youth. At a young age, Abelgas worked as a newspaper boy to help his family.

For his collegiate studies, Abelgas pursued a bachelor's degree in journalism at the Lyceum of the Philippines University in Manila. Abelgas also finished law studies but he was not able to pass the bar examination.

== Career ==
Prior to joining ABS-CBN, Abelgas worked in the Department of National Defense as a writer for Juan Ponce Enrile and as a correspondent for People's Journal, a tabloid newspaper before moving to television.

Abelgas joined ABS-CBN as early as 1987 as a member of the TV Patrol news team. He covered various natural disasters and events such as the 1991 eruption of Mount Pinatubo. Abelgas later shifted his focus to investigative journalism.

He covered crimes as an anchor in True Crime, Gus Abelgas Nag-uulat and Private I. In S.O.C.O.: Scene of the Crime Operatives, he worked with police and interviewed crime witnesses. He also communicates with convicted and suspected criminals as part of his work in S.O.C.O. Of his own approach, Albegas said he talks with the suspect calmly. He has received death threats from people whom he helped imprison – this became frequent that Abelgas no longer finds it bothersome.

Abelgas also lent his voice in the 2018 fantasy comedy film Fantastica where he provided the voice of the Fairy Godmother, a live-action role portrayed by Bela Padilla. For the role, he secured permission from ABS-CBN News and Current Affairs.

On July 15, 2023, Abelgas returned to television after a 3-year hiatus, after he transferred to TV5 and Cignal TV a few days before. He began hosting the program Gus Abelgas Forensics of One PH.

On October 24, 2025, Abelgas returned to ABS-CBN to host S.O.C.O. as a limited docuseries for iWant after a five-year hiatus. On March 7, 2026, he debuted on the second incarnation of DZMM through the revived S.O.C.O. sa DZMM.

== Personal life ==
Abelgas was married to Jocelyn Lising until her death on October 31, 2024, with whom he had two children. Lising was editor-in-chief at Pilipino Star Ngayon and Pang-Masa.

== Filmography ==
Film performances
| Year | Title | Role | Notes |
|---|---|---|---|
| 2018 | Fantastica | Fairy Godmother | Voiceover-only role of a character portrayed by Bela Padilla; billed as special participation. |

Television performances
| Year | Title | Role | Notes |
|---|---|---|---|
| 1987–2020 | TV Patrol | Crime Reporter | |
| 2001–2005 | True Crime and Private I | Host | |
| 2011 | Krusada | Host | |
| 2005–2020; 2025–present | S.O.C.O.: Scene of the Crime Operatives | Host | |
| 2023–2025 | Gus Abelgas Forensics | Host | |
| 2025 | Rainbow Rumble | Contestant | |
