= Negosyo Goals =

Philippine television talk show

- Title card since 2024
- Genre: Talk show
- Written by: Melisa Jose
- Directed by: Noel Angelo
- Presented by: Gerry Santos; Anna Magkawas; Benjie Paras
- Narrated by: Anna Magkawas
- Country of origin: Philippines
- Original language: Tagalog
- No. of seasons: 4
- No. of episodes: 50

Production
- Executive producer: Ivy Ataya
- Editors: Pancho Leoncio; Alain Flores
- Running time: 25–29 minutes
- Production company: Makers Mind Media Production

Original release
- Network: All TV (March 19, 2023 – October 22, 2023); GTV (February 11 – October 22, 2024)
- Release: March 19, 2023 – November 10, 2024

Negosyo Goals (transl. business goals) is a Philippine television business-oriented talk show broadcast by All TV and GTV. Originally hosted by Gerry "Mr. Freeze" Santos. It premiered on All TV on March 19, 2023. The show moved to GTV on February 11, 2024. The show concluded on November 10, 2024. Anna Magkawas served as the final host.

The show is streaming online on YouTube.

== Overview ==
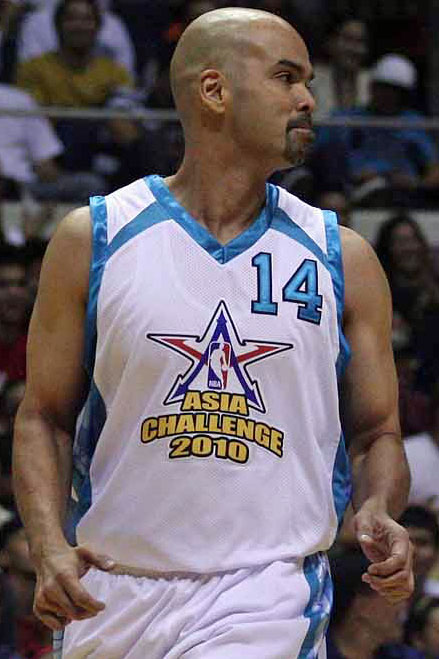
Benjie Paras served as a host.

The first two seasons were broadcast on All TV which consisted of 26 episodes. Anna Magkawas was hired as co-host for the segment called Ka-Negosyo with Anna, eventually becoming the show's host since season 2, replacing Santos.

On February 4, 2024, it was announced that Negosyo Goals would move to GTV, with actor Benjie Paras joining Magkawas as a co-host for the third season. It premiered on GTV on February 11, 2024.

== Accolades ==
Accolades received by Negosyo Goals
Year	Award	Category	Recipient	Result	Ref.
2025	37th PMPC Star Awards for Television	Best Magazine Show	Negosyo Goals	Nominated	
2025	37th PMPC Star Awards for Television	Best Magazine Show Host	Anna Magkawas	Nominated	
2025	38th PMPC Star Awards for Television	Best Educational Program	Negosyo Goals	Pending	
