= Vicky Morales =

Filipino journalist and television presenter (born 1969)

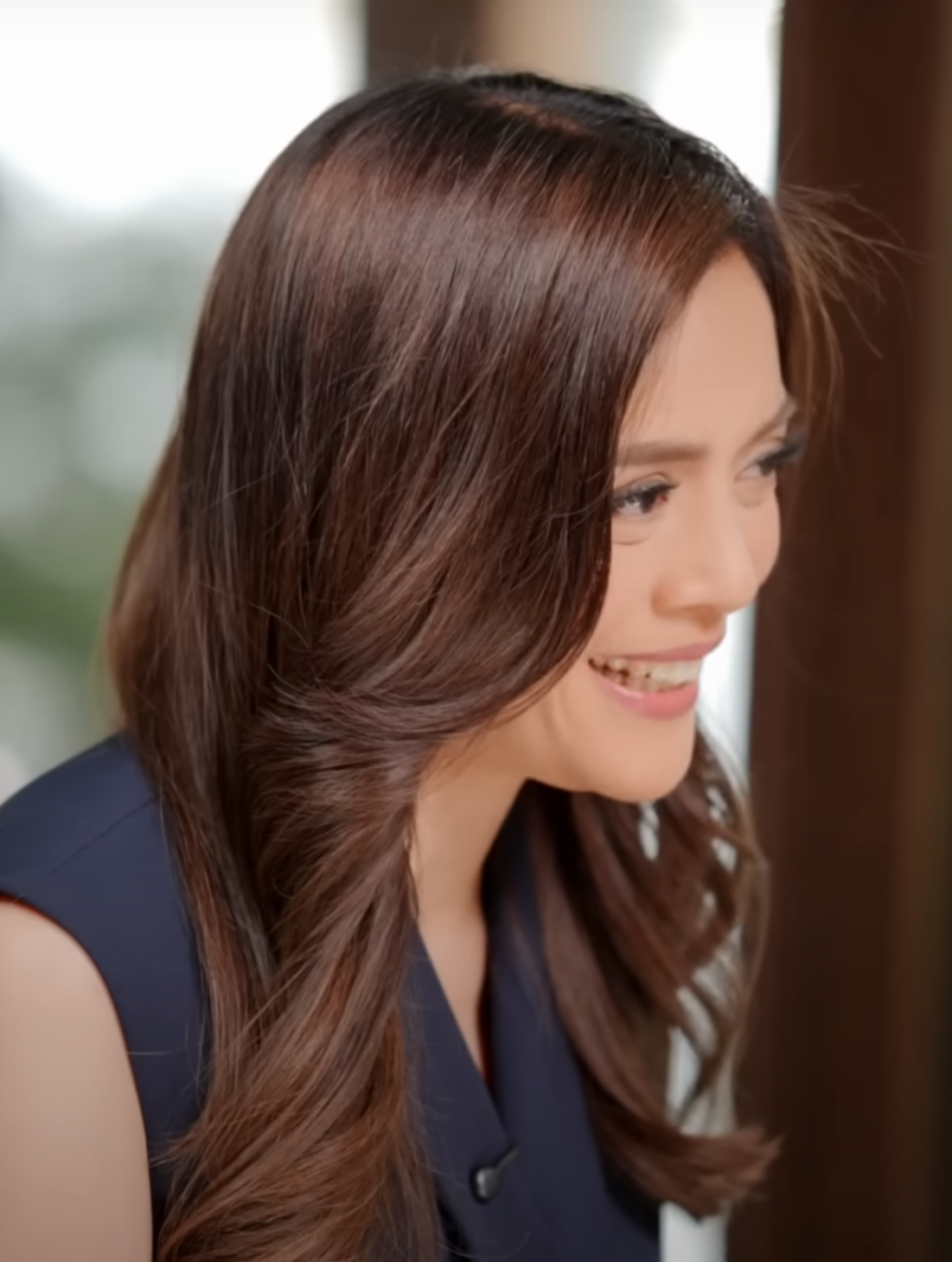
- Morales in 2025
- Born: Victoria Torres Morales; July 10, 1969 (age 57) (Note: Based on a post on the official Facebook page of GMA Network and another source that says that she celebrated her 51st birthday in 2020, her birthday is July 10 and her birth year is 1969, respectively.); Manila, Philippines
- Education: Ateneo de Manila University
- Occupations: Broadcast journalist; television presenter
- Years active: 1990–present
- Employer(s): ABS-CBN (1990); GMA Network (1990–present)
- Television: 24 Oras (co-anchor since 2014); Good News (host)
- Spouse: Alfonso "King" Reyno (m. 2001)
- Children: 3

Victoria Torres Morales-Reyno (Tagalog: [ˈbikɪ mɔˈɾalɛs]; born July 10, 1969) is a Filipino broadcast journalist and television presenter. She is a co-anchor of GMA Network's early evening newscast 24 Oras since 2014 and the host of the Saturday afternoon documentary-drama show Wish Ko Lang! from 2004 to 2026. For hosting Wish Ko Lang!, she received the "Best Public Service Program Host" award at the 29th PMPC Star Awards for Television in 2015. She previously anchored Saksi, the late news program of GMA Network, from 1999 to 2014. On GTV, she hosts a magazine news program entitled Good News Kasama si Vicky Morales, which was started in 2011 when GTV was previously known as GMA News TV.

Aside from receiving a PMPC Star Award, she received different accolades from other local awards including Catholic Mass Media Awards, UP Gandingan, USTv Awards, Gawad Tanglaw, Northwest Samar State University Student Choice Awards, and Anak TV Seal. Her skills as a journalist has also been recognized internationally by the Asian TV Awards, New York Festival, US International Film and Video Awards, and the George Foster Peabody Awards.

== Career ==
=== College years and ABS-CBN stint ===
When she entered the Ateneo de Manila University, she initially pursued a Bachelor of Science degree in management but later shifted to a communications course to pursue a journalism career. During her college years, her professor introduced her to ABS-CBN executive Charo Santos-Concio and then Morales auditioned for ABS-CBN. Santos-Concio wanted her to be an actress but Morales preferred to be a news reporter. She passed the auditions and then afterwards, she attended a training program. At one point during her training, she worked with Korina Sanchez for a short time.

After three months of training, ABS-CBN executives were not satisfied with her performance and thus removed her from the training program. However, this was not her last stint on ABS-CBN. She was later hired by Dong Puno as her production staff and later co-anchor on his business program on ABS-CBN. Morales said that she learned a lot from Puno and that she considered him her mentor.

During her younger years, she also appeared in a Coca-Cola commercial alongside singers Gary Valenciano and Sharon Cuneta.

=== Broadcast journalist at GMA Network ===
In 1990, after graduating college, Morales secretly applied for an anchor spot on GMA Headline News (the now-defunct late night English language news program of GMA Network) who would join the program's news presenters Tina Monzon-Palma and Jose Mari Velez. After then GMA's AVP for News Dan de Padua called Vicky, she was eventually hired as the news anchor for GMA Headline News and bested 500 other applicants. She anchored a segment of the said late news program entitled "Good News," which, incidentally, would become the title of her own news magazine program in 2011.

After ending her work at GMA Headline News, then GMA executive Tony Seva asked Vicky to reunite with Dong Puno on his morning news program entitled Business Today. After two years doing a morning show, she returned to evening news and anchored GMA Network News, which, first started in the English language and later reformatted in 1999 in the Filipino language.

In 1998, Morales started to be the news presenter of the late night Filipino language news program Saksi. The 1999-2004 edition of Saksi featured her former partner and Imbestigador host Mike Enriquez, who was her co-anchor in the 1998 Filipino language edition of GMA Network News. In 2004, Morales, became the late night Filipino language news program Saksi with new co-anchor Arnold Clavio and became the host of Wish Ko Lang! a Saturday-afternoon public service drama anthology show. replacing Bernadette Sembrano. She was already part of I-Witness before entering Wish Ko Lang!

Upon the opening of the GMA News TV channel in 2011, she was given the program entitled Good News Kasama si Vicky Morales. The channel was later rebranded to GTV and Morales's show was carried over. On November 10, 2014, Morales became a co-anchor on GMA Network's 6:30 PM news program, 24 Oras, becoming the newscast's third anchor, after being with Saksi for the last 15 years and was replaced by Pia Arcangel.

== Personal life ==
Morales's parents are Dante Morales and Ma. Luisa Torres Morales. Dante, her father and a medical doctor, was one of the directors of the Manila Jockey Club, which he succeeded from his wife, Ma. Luisa, who was also a board member of the club.

Morales is married to lawyer Alfonso "King" Reyno since June 2, 2001. Incidentally, Reyno is also part of the Manila Jockey Club just like Morales's parents as he is the Chief Operating Officer (COO) of the club. The couple have three children: twins Filippo Luis and Leon Alfonso (both born 2008), and Daniela Simone (born 2010).

== Public image ==
As a journalist in her television programs, Morales perceives herself as not the intellectual type nor the hard-hitting, confrontational kind but she will defend a position that she hold dear. In addition, she will deliver the news as who she is, that is, being compassionate. She created a positive public persona that brings hope and simple happiness to her viewers as reflected on her shows Wish Ko Lang! and Good News. Her attitude towards upholding her position was put into test in 2020 when she interviewed Dr. Bong Javier, Makati Medical Center director, regarding the breaching of the COVID-19 protocols by Senator Koko Pimentel at the hospital. The public, particularly netizens, praised Morales and described her as being frustrated with Pimentel yet calm during the interview.

Despite being recognized as a seasoned journalist, Morales committed several gaffes on live television. One of which happened on October 12, 2020, in 24 Oras where she can be seen holding a cue card with the text facing the camera. The text contained a Taglish phrase saying "PA-REVIEW NG SCRIPT PLEASE" (PLEASE REVIEW THE SCRIPT). Another blooper happened on May 20, 2021, also in 24 Oras, when she said her outro differently. She uttered "At dahil hindi natutuli…ay natutulog ang balita!" (this can be roughly translated to "And because the news can not be circumcised…oops, is not sleeping") instead of just "At dahil hindi natutulog ang balita!". Although, it seems that Morales did this in a humorous manner because she said her outro before a report about circumcision during the COVID-19 pandemic and the banter between Mel Tiangco and Mike Enriquez, her co-anchors, about the topic. In an interview, Morales explained that she did not make a blooper and she said the line on purpose and added that the "news is not circumcised, meaning we do not cut or censor our news to favor anyone."

== Television programs ==
Year	Title	Role
1991–1992	GMA Headline News	News Anchor
1992–1999	GMA Network News	News Anchor
1999–2014	Saksi	News Anchor
1999–2004	I-Witness	Host
2004–2026	Wish Ko Lang!	Host
2007	Philippine Agenda	Host
2011–present	Good News	Host
2014–present	24 Oras	News Anchor
2020	Ilaban Natin Yan!	Host
