= Toni (talk show) =

Philippine talk show

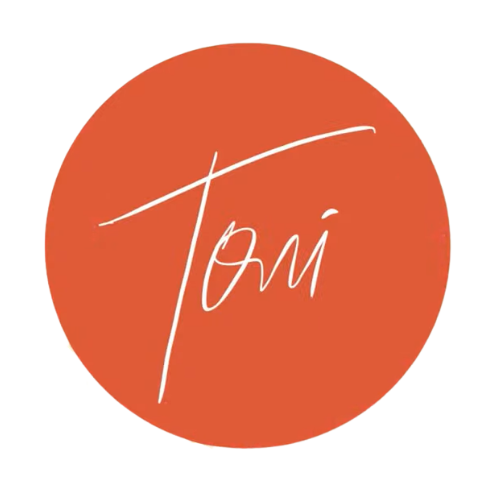
- Genre: Talk show
- Written by: Trisha Gambino-Uy
- Directed by: Jake Soriano
- Presented by: Toni Gonzaga
- Country of origin: Philippines
- Original language: Filipino
- No. of episodes: 140

Production
- Executive producer: AC Sales
- Producers: Toni Gonzaga; Paul Soriano
- Running time: 1 hour

Original release
- Network: All TV
- Release: October 3, 2022 – July 28, 2023

Toni is a Philippine television talk show hosted and produced by Toni Gonzaga. It aired on All TV from October 3, 2022 to July 28, 2023. The show was cancelled due to low ratings, technical issues and Toni's other commitments, such as her return to Eat Bulaga! on TV5 and RPTV a few months later.

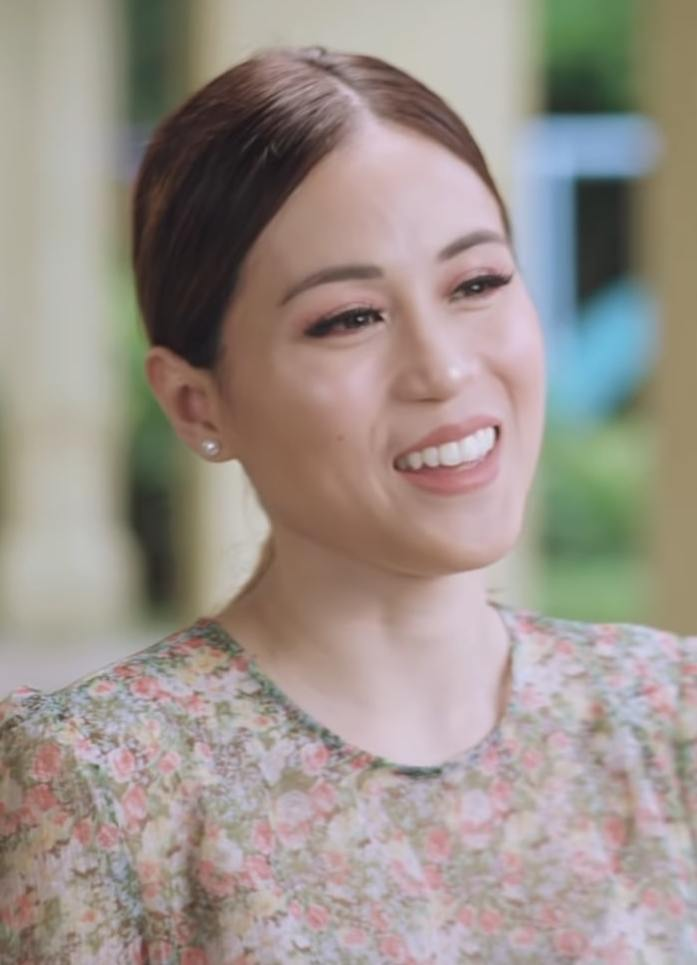
Toni Gonzaga served as the host and producer.
