= M.O.M.S — Mhies on a Mission =

2022–23 Philippine talk show

- Genre: Talk show
- Written by: Ruth Pena Padriga; Jeichelle Mahinay
- Directed by: Gary Puno
- Presented by: Ruffa Gutierrez; Mariel Rodriguez; Ciara Sotto
- Country of origin: Philippines
- Original language: Filipino
- No. of episodes: 50

Production
- Executive producer: Nancy Benito Yabut
- Producers: Grachel Castro; Jing De Jesus-Gio
- Running time: 60 minutes
- Production company: All TV

Original release
- Network: All TV
- Release: November 28, 2022 – February 6, 2023

M.O.M.S — Mhies on a Mission (simply M.O.M.s or Mhies on a Mission) was a Philippine talk show aired by ALLTV, hosted by Ruffa Gutierrez, Mariel Rodriguez and Ciara Sotto. It aired from November 28, 2022 to February 6, 2023.

On February 6, 2023, Gutierrez said that the show would pause for couple of months. A month later, Sotto clarified that the show was cancelled due to technical issues and other commitments, with replays of the past episodes aired until December 28, 2025.

== Hosts ==
Hosts

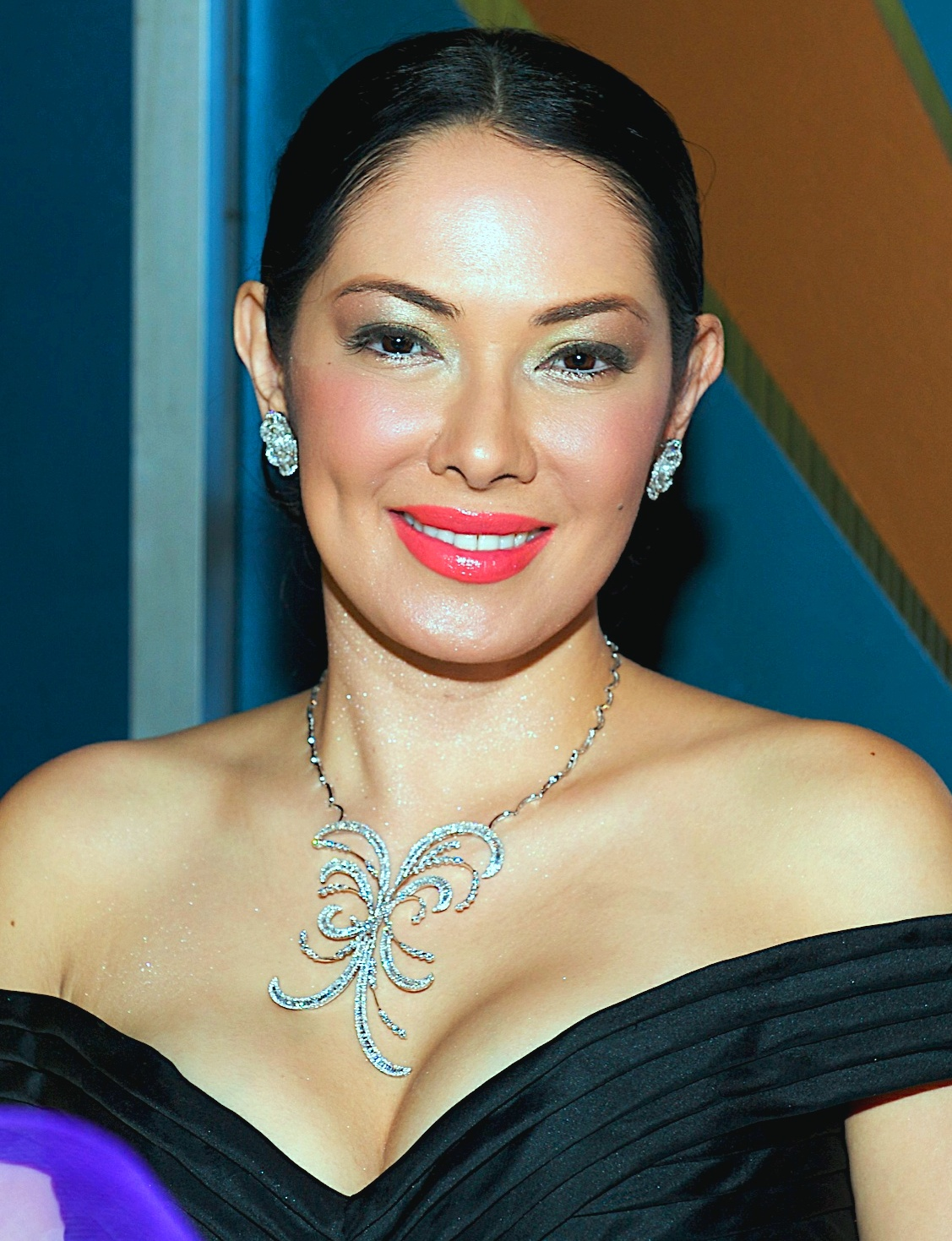
Ruffa Gutierrez

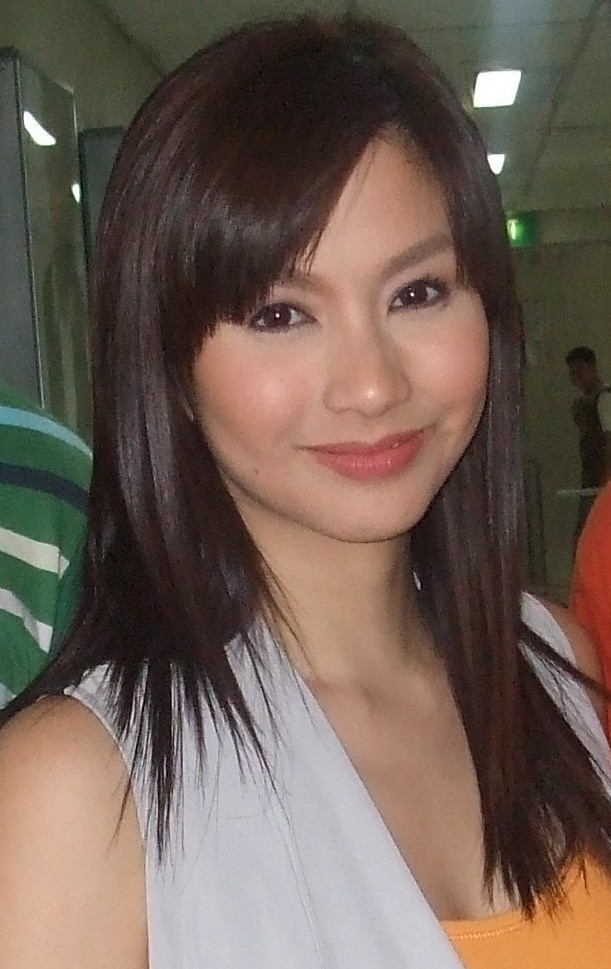
Mariel Rodriguez

- Ruffa Gutierrez
- Mariel Rodriguez
- Ciara Sotto
