= Mariz Umali =

Filipino journalist (born 1980)

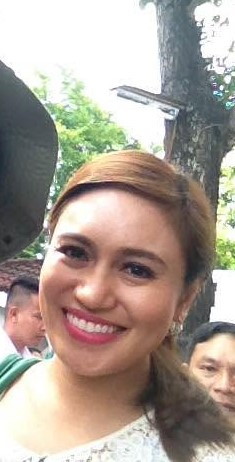
- Umali in 2017
- Born: Marie Grace Michelle Bade Umali; March 4, 1980 (age 46); Manila, Philippines
- Education: University of the Philippines (BA)
- Occupations: Journalist; news anchor; TV host
- Years active: 2001–present
- Agents: GMA Integrated News and Public Affairs; (2001–present)
- Television: Balitanghali Weekend i-Witness; Born to Be Wild
- Spouse: Raffy Tima (m. 2012)

Marie Grace Michelle "Mariz" Bade Umali-Tima (Tagalog: [mɐˈɾis ʊˈmali ˈtimɐ]; born March 4, 1980) is a Filipino television news anchor journalist and host. She is known for being the main newscaster of the weekend edition of GMA News TV's Balitanghali (first aired in Q in 2010 and she is with former co-anchor Jun Veneracion until 2019). She finished broadcast communications course at the University of the Philippines Diliman but she started as a pharmacy student. She started to work at GMA Network as a researcher and producer of news content for the 2001 Philippine general elections. Besides Balitanghali, she also appeared as host or documentarian in other television shows such as i-Witness, Out of Control and Born to Be Wild. She also appears as one of the host of the Unang Hirit, GMA Network's morning show.

== Early life ==
Umali wanted to be a doctor, thus, she enrolled in a course related to medicine, which is pharmacy but she later transferred to broadcast communications at the University of the Philippines Diliman, from where she graduated cum laude. In 2000, she ran as Chairman of UP Diliman University Student Council but she lost to Raymond Palatino who would eventually represent the Kabataan party-list at the House of Representatives. She also joined UP-CMC Broadcast Association, a non-profit organization of UPD College of Mass Communication.

== Career ==
As she was about to turn 21, Umali started as a producer and researcher at GMA Network, covering the 2001 general elections in the Philippines. Later on, she became a news reporter and her first live news field report was at a PAGASA (Philippine Atmospheric, Geophysical and Astronomical Service Administration) press conference also in 2001. According to Umali, she considers the exclusive interview of the suspects of the Nida Blanca murder case as her big break of her career. She also had reported dangerous coverage such as Manila Peninsula siege and Typhoon Parma (Pepeng).

Other than being a reporter, Umali is also a newscaster and host in various television programs of GMA Network and GMA News TV such as Balitanghali Weekend, News TV Live, Born to Be Wild and Out of Control. She also delivered news in the now defunct hourly news update program GMA Flash Report. In the public affairs program Hired! (previously known as May Trabaho Ka) of the former QTV/Q (later GMA News TV, now GTV), Umali received an Anak TV Seal award. She also became one of the host of the travel and lifestyle show entitled Travel: More Fun In The Philippines and she along with other hosts Kara David, Susan Enriquez, Cesar Apolinario, Maey Bautista and Betong Sumaya were nominated as Best Lifestyle/Travel Show Hosts in the 26th PMPC Star Awards for Television in 2012. In the morning news program Kape at Balita, Umali along with her co-hosts Susan Enriquez, Joel Reyes Zobel, Michael Fajatin and Valerie Tan were nominated as Best Morning Show Hosts in the 27th PMPC Star Awards for Television in 2013. From time to time, she is invited to be a host or speaker in various events.

In 2016, during a press conference for the incoming President of the Philippines Rodrigo Duterte, he catcalled Umali. Due to this incident, Raffy Tima, Umali's husband, commented on social media that the catcalling done to his wife is "uncalled for and disrespectful to women". Umali on her part did not expect an apology from Duterte. In defense, a spokesperson of Duterte, Salvador Panelo said that Duterte did not intend to hurt the feelings of Umali. Panelo added that the catcall was "a joke and a compliment".

During the 17th Gawad Tanglaw Awards in May 2019, Umali won the Best Female Field Reporter award. In July 2019, Umali became one of the news presenters and hosts of the morning show of GMA 7, Unang Hirit.

In June 2024, Umali interviewed Ukrainian President Volodymyr Zelenskyy one-on-one during the president's visit to Manila amid the Russian invasion of Ukraine.

== Personal life ==
Raised in a Roman Catholic family, Umali has said: "I am Catholic … and I am proud". She was a member of her church's choir. Umali has been married to fellow journalist Raffy Tima since 2012. She had worked with Tima in 2001. Umali was named as "hottest newswomen" by Spot.ph, an entertainment website in 2012.
