= My Puhunan: Kaya Mo! =

Philippine documentary news magazine television program

- Title card
- Also known as: My Puhunan (2013–2015; 2015–2020)
- Genre: Documentary news magazine
- Created by: ABS-CBN News and Current Affairs
- Presented by: Karen Davila; Migs Bustos
- Theme music composer: Noel Cabangon
- Opening theme: "My Puhunan Theme" by Noel Cabangon feat. Ryke (2013–2015; 2015–2020) "My Puhunan: Kaya Mo! Theme" by Noel Cabangon feat. Ryke (since 2023)
- Ending theme: "My Puhunan Theme" by Noel Cabangon feat. Ryke (2013–2015; 2015–2020) "My Puhunan: Kaya Mo! Theme" by Noel Cabangon feat. Ryke (since 2023)
- Country of origin: Philippines
- Original language: Filipino
- No. of episodes: 276 (1st run); 169 (2nd run)

Production
- Executive producer: Karen Namora
- Producer: Gerald Oro
- Editor: JH Bersamina
- Production company: ABS-CBN News and Current Affairs

Original release
- Network: ABS-CBN
- Release: July 17, 2013 – February 4, 2015
- Release: July 7, 2015 – May 2, 2020
- Network: Kapamilya Channel (Note: The program also airs on A2Z, All TV (since 2026), ANC, Kapamilya Online Live and on-demand via iWant.)
- Release: July 16, 2023 – present

Related
- Pinoy True Stories

My Puhunan: Kaya Mo! (transl. my investment: you can!; formerly My Puhunan) is a Philippine television documentary news magazine broadcast by ABS-CBN and Kapamilya Channel. Hosted by Karen Davila and Migs Bustos, it aired from July 17, 2013 to February 4, 2015, replacing Saklolo and was replaced by RealiTV. The show returned from July 7, 2015 to May 2, 2020 and again since July 16, 2023, replacing Mang Lalakbay.

== Overview ==
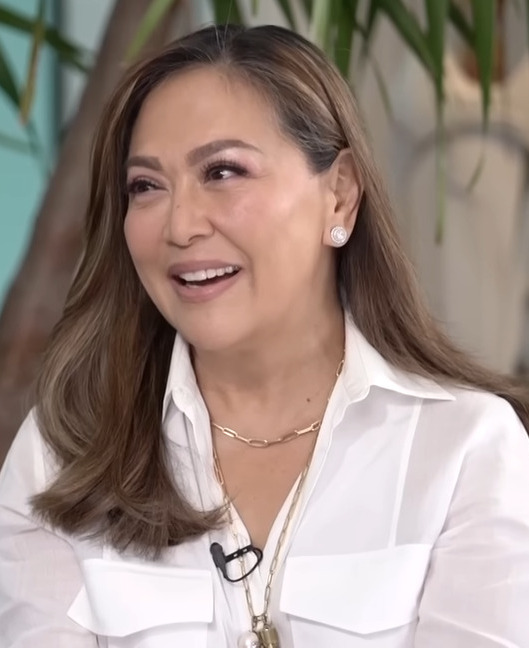
Karen Davila serves as a host.

The program has chronicled the rags-to-riches journeys of everyday Filipinos and, on rare occasions, famous people who have turned into successful business owners. In addition, it shows how business owners may help aspiring business owners by sharing their knowledge and experience to aid in the launch of their enterprises.

In its 2023 revival, the show occasionally features business owners previously featured in the show's original run, whose successes were expanded and their lives changed with the show's help.

== History ==
=== As My Puhunan (2013–2015; 2015–2020) ===
The program formerly premiered on ABS-CBN as My Puhunan under the Pinoy True Stories block on July 17, 2013, with Karen Davila as the main host. The show premiered on Kapamilya Gold in the afternoon block. In December 2015, the show was moved to late-night after Bandila, airing every Tuesday until it was eventually cancelled on May 2, 2020, after the network was issued a cease-and-desist order by the National Telecommunications Commission on May 5 after its legislative franchise expired on May 4. Reruns of past episodes are airing on Knowledge Channel.

=== As My Puhunan: Kaya Mo! (2023–present) ===
Coinciding with the 10th anniversary of the program, the program returned on the Kapamilya Channel's Yes Weekend! Sunday edition block, Kapamilya Online Live and A2Z on July 16, 2023 after a 3-year hiatus, at 9:30 A.M. timeslot, this time with its new title, My Puhunan: Kaya Mo! with Davila reprising her role as host, this time with new host, Migs Bustos.

On September 16, 2023, the program changed to the Saturday afternoon timeslot at 5:00 P.M., replacing the timeslot left by the last 30 minutes of Kapamilya Action Sabado.

On July 7, 2024, the program changed to the Sunday afternoon timeslot at 4:00 P.M., replacing the timeslot left by the first 30 minutes of the reruns of Ipaglaban Mo!.

On January 4, 2026, the program expanded its airing to All TV, marking its return to channels 2 and 16 in Mega Manila and regional channels previously held by ABS-CBN until 2020. This occurred just a year and 8 months after ABS-CBN Corporation and Advanced Media Broadcasting System (AMBS), signed content agreements to air ABS-CBN programs on the said channel.

On May 17, 2026, the program changed to the Sunday afternoon timeslot at 3:00 P.M., replacing the timeslot left by Sunday Blockbusters.

== Accolades ==
Accolades received by My Puhunan
Year	Awards	Category	Recipient	Result	Ref.
2019	ComGuild Media Awards	Best Magazine Show Host	Karen Davila	Won	
2020	NCST Dangal ng Bayan Awards	Media Excellence Award for Business & Administration	My Puhunan	Awarded	
