= List of Wildflower characters =

Wildflower is a Philippine revenge drama television series starring Maja Salvador, together with an ensemble cast. The series premiered on ABS-CBN's Primetime Bida evening block and worldwide on The Filipino Channel on February 13, 2017, to February 9, 2018.

The story revolves around Lily Cruz, a girl whose parents were murdered by the Ardiente family. She vows revenge against the family, and plots several schemes in orchestrating the downfall of the Ardiente family. She introduces herself as Ivy Aguas, a billionaire, and penetrates the Ardiente family. In addition, Wildflower also chronicles Lily Cruz and Diego Torillo, childhood best friends whose love is intertwined with the Ardiente family. They try to love each other despite the chaos of the family.

== Cast and characters ==
=== Main ===
Actor	Character	Seasons			
Actor	Character	1	2	3	4
Maja Salvador	Lily Cruz-Torillo	Main	Main	Main	Main
Maja Salvador	Ivy P. Aguas	Main	Main	Main	
Tirso Cruz III	Julio Ardiente	Main	Main	Main	Main
Zsa Zsa Padilla	Helena Montoya			Special guest	Main
Zsa Zsa Padilla	Red Dragon			Special guest	Main
Aiko Melendez	Emilia Ardiente-Torillo	Main	Main	Main	Main
Joseph Marco	Diego Torillo	Supporting	Main	Main	Main
Sunshine Cruz	Camia Delos Santos-Cruz	Main	Main	Main	Main
Sunshine Cruz	Jasmine	Main			
Wendell Ramos	Raul Torillo	Main	Main	Main	Main
Wendell Ramos	Fake Jaguar		Main	Main	Main
RK Bagatsing	Arnaldo A. Torillo	Supporting	Main	Main	Main
Vin Abrenica	Jepoy Madrigal	Supporting	Main	Main	Main
Yen Santos	Rosana "Ana" Navarro-Madrigal		Supporting	Supporting	Main
Yen Santos	Fake Lily Cruz		Supporting	Supporting	
Christian Vasquez	Atty. Dante Cruz	Special guest			Special guest
Christian Vasquez	Damian Cruz			Supporting	Main
Christian Vasquez	Real Jaguar			Supporting	Main
Roxanne Barcelo	Natalie Alcantara	Supporting	Supporting	Supporting	Main
Miko Raval	Marlon Cabrera		Supporting	Supporting	Main

- Maja Salvador as Lily Cruz-Torillo / Ivy D. Aguas: Dante and Camia Cruz’ daughter who flees Poblacion Ardiente after her parents are killed. She is legally adopted by Prianka Aguas, a billionaire-philanthropist who owns one of the largest property development firms in the country and a widow who lost her husband and daughter to assassination. When Ivy returns to Poblacion Ardiente, she rekindles her friendship with Diego, her childhood best friend while methodically executing her plans for revenge against the Ardientes. She is strong-willed and cunning, a skilled martial artist and trained fighter, with the ability to hold her own against the Ardientes. She purposely drives Arnaldo insane until he takes his own life. She successfully gathers evidence against Emilia's corruption and plunder as governor and manipulates events to turn Julio against her while driving her insane. She exposes Julio’s corruption, removing him from his position and crippling his power base. As Lily Cruz, she dedicates her money and resources to rid Poblacion Ardiente of the Ardientes and rebuild the community. In the end, Lily becomes the Governor in Poblacion Ardiente after her late husband Diego. She later becomes a Senator and is last shown winning the Presidential election via landslide.
- Tirso Cruz III as Emillio "Julio" Ardiente: Ivy’s enemy, he is the corrupt political patriarch of Poblacion Ardiente and a cold-blooded mass murderer. As Emilia's cruel and abusive domineering father, Julio is determined to keep his bloodline in power by raising his grandson Arnaldo in his likeness. Despite Lily Cruz’ efforts to cripple his political power, he manages to keep his position as Congressman and later Governor. In desperation, he stirs up his loyalists to lynch Lily. This fails when his atrocities are fully unmasked and the townspeople discover the mass graves. He is then ousted in a popular uprising. In the end Emilia shoots and kills him to pay for her the deaths of her mother(s) and aunt. His last scene is in a laboratory in an unspecified location, at the mercy of Dragon Ladies and Helena’s adopted daughter, who torture him to death with a blowtorch for his evil deeds.
- Zsa Zsa Padilla as Helena Montoya / Red Dragon: She is an enemy of Lily Cruz, who utilizes her female foot soldiers called "The Dragon Ladies" to kill her enemies. Her motivation against Lily is fueled by Lily’s adversarial relationship with her daughter Emilia Ardiente. In public, she is a successful jeweler and philanthropist with interests to invest in Poblacion Ardiente, in the underworld, she is known as the cunning leader of criminal syndicates that run all over the country and neighboring Asian countries. She is killed by her ex-husband Julio Ardiente for her betrayal in attempting to bury him alive and his desire to take over her syndicate, by bombing the ambulance she was in after being shot by Lily. Her actions lead the downfall of her ex-husband and her daughter. In the finale, Emilia avenges her mother’s death by shooting Julio.
- Aiko Melendez as Emilia Ardiente-Torillo: Julio's daughter. Raised in a highly misogynistic family, Emilia’s ambition is to attain her father’s approval and obtain power similar to her father and son. She is a corrupt politician who casually orders assassinations of anyone who goes against her as well as Raul's mistresses (referred to in the family jargon as "good-jobbing"). From the start, she mistrusts Ivy Aguas' motives for befriending her family and develops a complicated relationship with her. She asserts her influence as Governor more decisively after Julio falls ill. Emilia unwittingly kills her husband Raul and for the most part of the series is unaware that her father is responsible for her aunt’s and mother’s death. She and her father escape the popular uprising that overthrows them from Poblacion Ardiente but when she finally figures out her father's role in killing her mother and aunt, she shoots Julio multiple times after he shoots her spine resulting to paralysis. At the finale, Lily visits her in jail on her birthday and forgives her.
- Joseph Marco as Diego Torillo: Lily’s husband. Diego is the illegitimate son of Raul whose mother was among several mistresses ordered killed by Emilia, is treated coldly by Emilia and harshly by Julio and his half-brother Arnaldo. He develops a closer relationship with his father Raul, his nanny Loring and her husband Pandoy, his tutor Camia and his best friend Lily Cruz. Unlike the Ardientes, he is a man of the people, helping establish the farmers' cooperative and running as governor against the Ardientes. After saving Lily from being lynched by the Ardientes, and successfully chasing them out of town, Diego becomes the new governor of Poblacion Ardiente. During his inauguration, he is fatally shot by Julio with a sniper rifle in retaliation for Arnaldo's death. Diego’s death sparks a popular revulsion that turns the Ardientes into wanted pariahs. His wife Lily replaces him as governor after his death.
- Sunshine Cruz as Camia Delos Santos-Cruz / Jasmine: A loving and devoted wife to Dante and mother to Lily Cruz. She offers free education and daycare for the children of Poblacion Ardiente. Her beauty catches the attention of Raul Torillo who tries to sexually assault her. Emilia, Raul's wife, retaliates by ordering her henchman to sexually assault and bury her alive. Emilia is unaware that Raul saved Camia and kept her as a prisoner-slave in another town for a decade. She suffers a mental breakdown and is unable to speak. Raul calls her Jasmin. She is rescued and rehabilitated by Ivy Aguas. After care and rehabilitation, Camia recognizes her daughter, and joins forces with her daughter’s plan for revenge. After Ivy Aguas reveals her true identity, she becomes a visible personality in her daughter’s rebuilding efforts for Poblacion Ardiente. She secures a pardon to free Damian from prison and marries him soon after.
- Wendell Ramos as Raul Torillo / Fake Jaguar: He is Diego and Arnaldo's father. The son of a former bodyguard of Julio, he is Emilia's wife but is also a serial philanderer who attempts to sexually assault Camia. He rescues Camia from being buried alive by Emilia’s henchmen. For over a decade, he hides Camia and changes her identity to Jasmin as part of an unrequited love. He briefly connives with Natalie in an attempt to bring down the Ardientes under a borrowed identity of a feared criminal boss, Jaguar. He is torn between his love for his sons, and thirst for power. He hates his father-in-law, who in turn sees him as incompetent, and disrespects his wife, but has a complicated relationship with her. He later tries to make amends for his mistakes for the sake of Diego and to protect Camia from Emilia's wrath. He stands up against Julio and helps Damian and Diego rescue Lily and Camia from the Ardientes, in the process receiving Damian's blessing to become the next Jaguar. Disguised as Jaguar, he tries to stop Emilia from shooting Camia and Damian. In the struggle, Emilia fatally shoots him. Realizing it is her husband she shot, Emilia is distraught. Dying, he apologizes to her for his philandering and tells her he did love her. He is posthumously forgiven by Camia.
- RK Bagatsing as Arnaldo A. Torillo: Raul and Emilia’s son who murders Carlota Navarro and other innocent people. He is a psychopath obsessed with Ivy. Since childhood, Julio trains him to carry on the political legacy of the family. Ivy intentionally targets Arnaldo first as a means to bring down the power of the Ardientes. He suffers a serious brain injury and becomes comatose, after which he wakes up into a different personality: kind, gentle, religious. During this period, he develops a good sibling relationship with his brother Diego, a relationship both never experienced while growing up. Unfortunately, Arnaldo’s memories return and he resumes his vengeful plan against Lily. He attempts to kill Diego and Lily on their honeymoon but fails. In despair, when he realizes that Lily would never love him, he kills himself instead.
- Vin Abrenica as Jepoy Madrigal: Ivy's childhood friend after her escape from Poblacion Ardiente. A street urchin who rescues Ivy from a pedophile, he is taken in by Prianka. He joins Ivy in Poblacion Ardiente as Arnaldo’s bodyguard, spying for valuable intel to penetrate the Ardientes. His betrayal is discovered and he is tortured by Julio and Emilia. He escapes but returns to Poblacion Ardiente with Ana Navarro to help execute Ivy's plan. He is embroiled in a convoluted love triangle with Natalie and Ana, but ends up with the latter in the finale.
- Yen Santos as Rosanna "Ana" Navarro-Madrigal / Fake Lily Cruz: Carlota's niece who becomes a childhood friend of Lily/Ivy and Jepoy. She quits her job as a teacher and comes to Poblacion Ardiente when she hears of her foster mother Carlota’s murder. She takes on Lily Cruz’ identity to protect Ivy's plan against the Ardientes until Ivy reveals her true identity later in the series. After the elections, she resumes teaching in Poblacion Ardiente, and together with Jepoy and Marlon look after a reformed Arnaldo. She is unhappy with the brewing relationship between Jepoy and Natalie. They get married in the finale.
- Christian Vasquez as Atty. Dante Cruz / Damian "Jaguar" Cruz: A righteous man of high principles and values who moves his family to Poblacion Ardiente to start a fresh life as a lawyer in the Public Attorney's Office. He starts to get suspicious with the unusually low crime rate and suspicious accidents in the town and begins to investigate, unknowingly going against the powerful Ardientes. He files a sexual harassment case against Raul for the attempted rape of his wife. This leads to his death, Camia’s rape and Lily's disappearance. His values are an inspiration for Lily, and his murder fuels her wrath against the Ardientes. Vasquez also plays Dante's estranged twin brother: Damian, who is a morally conflicted individual who broke contact with his brother over his criminal activities and has assumed the identity of Jaguar, an infamous crime lord who is also Red Dragon’s best lieutenant. He lends his identity to Raul Torillo while in police custody as part of a plan hatched by Natalie to give Raul an advantage against his father in law. Damian returns to claim his identity but Raul refuses to give it up. In a stand-off between the two Jaguars (Raul and Damian) Damian is shot and unexpectedly rescued by Ivy and Camia. He is attracted to his sister-in-law who is unaware of his criminal activities, secretly protecting her and her daughter Lily, while he continues to pose as Jaguar behind the scene. He makes peace with Raul when his son Diego allies with Red Dragon. Damian is branded a traitor by Helena after she kidnaps Lily and Camia. Damian successfully rescues Camia with the help of Raul, Diego and Lily. He turns himself in to authorities and makes a public statement confirming Red Dragon is Helena Montoya, effectively refuting Julio’s accusation that Lily is the real crime syndicate boss. In the end, he is pardoned and marries Camia.
- Roxanne Barcelo as Natalie Alcantara: She is Arnaldo's former fiancée, a seductive and dangerous Femme Fatale, used by the Ardientes because of her father's political power base. After Ivy seduces Arnaldo, he dumps Natalie, which creates her initial conflict with Ivy. She seeks revenge against the Ardientes after learning that it was Emilia who had her father killed after he refused to support her senatorial bid in upcoming elections. She collaborates with Damian to recruit Raul to sustain Jaguar's business, thus lending Jaguar's identity to Raul. She then turns to Jepoy, becomes obsessively in love with him and damages his relationship with Ana. For the most part of the series, she works separately from Lily and often works against her despite sharing the same enemy until the finale, when she joins forces with Jepoy and Lily to bring down the Ardientes and join the final attack on the Ardientes' lair. Natalie reconciles with Lily and becomes one of her closest friends in her. Her new love interest is Diego’s best friend, Marlon, the new Mayor of Poblacion Ardiente.
- Miko Raval as Marlon "Batch" Cabrera: He is Diego's university batch mate and best friend who helps Diego for his campaign and election. He eventually becomes Mayor and Natalie's love interest.

=== Supporting ===
Actor	Character	Seasons			
Actor	Character	1	2	3	4
Malou de Guzman	Lorena "Loring" Cervantes	Supporting	Supporting	Supporting	
Bodjie Pascua	Leopando "Pandoy" Cervantes	Supporting	Supporting	Supporting	
Isay Alvarez-Seña	Clarita "Claire" De Guzman	Supporting	Supporting	Supporting	
Ana Abad Santos	Carlotta Navarro	Supporting	Supporting		Special guest
Ingrid dela Paz	Nimfa Naig	Supporting	Supporting		
Chinggoy Alonzo	Pablo Alcantara	Supporting			
Jett Pangan	William Alvarez	Supporting			
Arnold Reyes	Arthur Vergara	Supporting	Supporting	Supporting	Supporting
Shiela Valderrama	Atty. Georgina Fisher	Supporting	Supporting	Supporting	Supporting
Richard Quan	Col. Jose Sanggano			Supporting	
Bobby Andrews	Mateo Ruiz			Supporting	Supporting
Alma Concepcion	Divine Oytengco			Supporting	
Maika Rivera	Stefanie Oytengco			Supporting	
Biboy Ramirez	Jude Asuncion			Supporting	
Nina Ricci Alagao	Mercedes Palacio			Supporting	
Jun Urbano	Ramon Lim (North)			Supporting	
Bernard Laxa	Silverio Victoria (East)			Supporting	
Bong Regala	Carlos Isidro (West)			Supporting	
Matthew Mendoza	Oscar Evangelista (South)			Supporting	
Dawn Chang	Maila Lomeda / Ms. Moran			Supporting	Supporting
Jeffrey Santos	Col. Magbanua			Supporting	Supporting
Jong Cuenco	Judge Manuel Lustre			Supporting	Supporting
Michael Flores	NBI Agent Noel Salonga			Supporting	Supporting

- Malou de Guzman as Lorena "Loring" Cervantes: She is the second mother to Diego and the former maid of the Ardientes, she took care of Diego when he was younger, and then took him in when he left the Ardientes for good. She actively helps Diego's campaign and is killed by Sanggano
- Bodjie Pascua as Leopando "Pandoy" Cervantes: He is the second father to Diego and a loving husband to Loring. He also helps Diego's campaign. He and his wife are killed by Sanggano in front of Diego.
- Isay Alvarez-Seña as Clarita "Claire" De Guzman: She is Emilia's aunt and the sister of Esmeralda, Emilia's late (adoptive) mother. She resents Julio for his abusiveness towards her sister and helps Emilia resist her father's domineering. When Julio fails to bail Emilia from jail, she threatens to expose Julio about Emilia's real mother. Julio orders his henchmen to kill her. Before dying, Clarita she tells Emilia that Esmeralda is not her mother.
- Ana Abad Santos as Carlotta Navarro: The foster mother of Ivy Aguas, Ana, Jepoy, and housekeeper of Prianka Aguas. She is extremely suspicious of Arnaldo, who later strangles her to death in a home invasion and covers it up as a suicide.
- Ingrid dela Paz as Nimfa Naig: Diego's college best friend who betrays Diego because Emilia manipulates her to spy on his campaign. She discovers Ivy is Lily Cruz and tells Arnaldo everything but in his psychotic state, Arnaldo refuses to believe her and kills her instead and later frames Diego for the crime.
- Chinggoy Alonzo as Pablo Alcantara: Natalie's father who is a Senator and political ally of Julio. He is ordered assassinated by Emilia after choosing Arnaldo over her in his party's senatorial lineup for the upcoming elections.
- Jett Pangan as William Alvarez, Vice Governor of Ardiente: He becomes acting Governor after Emilia is forced to step down by her father. He later turns against the Ardientes but is killed by Jepoy on Julio's orders.
- Arnold Reyes as Arthur Vergara: A co-worker of Dante in the PAO who harbors a grudge against the Ardientes for the murder of his sister and his role in covering up their crimes. Arthur unwittingly gives a poisoned drink prepared by Emilia to Lily's father that gives him a fatal heart attack. After the presumed disappearance of the Cruz family he becomes a wandering madman who is rehabilitated by Ivy and joins her after being tortured for being falsely accused of wrecking Julio's statue. Arthur collaborates with Ivy in plotting a fake kidnap of Ivy to bait Arnaldo, leading to a confrontation with the latter that is secretly recorded on camera that captures Arnaldo's confession for his murders. Arthur plays this video during Ivy and Arnaldo's wedding which triggers Arnaldo's breakdown and political downfall. He also kidnaps Divine who turns whistle blower in their case against Emilia Ardiente. In the finale, he joins the attack on the Ardientes' lair.
- Shiela Valderrama as Atty. Georgina Fisher: The high-profile attorney of Ivy, Camia and Deigo in their cases against the Ardientes. In the finale, she is appointed CEO of the Aguas Group of Companies.
- Richard Quan as Col. Jose Sanggano: A former military officer who is hired by Julio to handle his criminal operations during the elections, including the attempt murder of Diego, Camia and Jepoy during campaign period. He is later killed by Diego in a bar gunfight in revenge for the killing of Loring and Pandoy.
- Bobby Andrews as Mateo Ruiz: The vice governor of Poblacion Ardiente, who becomes acting governor after Lily's exposure of Julio's corruption and his suspension from office. He is an upright man from a military background, whose anti-corruption stance entices Diego's camp to form an alliance. However, this falls apart after he is intimidated by Red Dragon into hiring Emilia as a consultant. He later steps back into his prior office after Julio's return and is violently shaken down by Julio, forcing him to go in hiding at the time of the popular uprising that overthrows the Ardientes, paving the way for Diego to assume office.
- Alma Concepcion as Divine Oytengco: A jeweller who is responsible for hiding Emilia's stolen money in her bank account. Ivy convinces her to turn whistleblower in their case against Emilia after being reminded of the latter's role in her husband's murder. She is assassinated by Red Dragon's men.
- Maika Rivera as Stefanie Oytengco: The daughter of Divine Oytengco, who witnesses her mother's murder.
- Biboy Ramirez as Jude Asuncion: An NBI Agent who helps Red Dragon/Helena Montoya to escape from the authorities and Lily Cruz.
- Nina Ricci Alagao as Mercedes Palacio: The most trusted ally and second in command of Red Dragon. Following Red Dragon’s orders, she orchestrates simultaneous bombings of Aguas Realty buildings. She disguises herself as a potential investor through Mr. Paterno as a distraction for Myla Lomeda to get into Aguas Realty main building to plant a bomb. Lily discovers her connection to Red Dragon and uses her to get inside intel on Red Dragon's operations. She is eventually exposed and killed by Arnaldo.
- Jun Urbano as Ramon Lim (North), Bernard Laxa as Silverio Victoria (East), Bong Regala as Carlos Isidro (West) and Matthew Mendoza as Oscar Evangelista (South) - collectively known as the Big Four, who work alongside Red Dragon in managing illegal activities in the Philippines. They are massacred by Julio Ardiente’s men. Oscar also serves as a sexual partner of Natalie, to whom he entrusts his criminal operations after his death.
- Dawn Chang as Maila Lomeda / Ms. Moran: The "Lady Bomber" responsible for the bombings of Aguas Realty buildings. Disguised as Ms. Moran, she gains access into the Aguas Realty main building through Mr. Paterno, only to be recognized and captured by Lily. Mercedes orders a hit on her but survives and makes a deal with Lily Cruz to testify to Red Dragon's activities in exchange of the safety of her family.
- Jeffrey Santos as Col. Magbanua: Shortly after the death of Colonel Sanggano, Julio Ardiente recruits him as head of security. Magbanua and his troops later abandon the Ardientes during the popular uprising against them.
- Jong Cuenco as Judge Manuel Lustre: A corrupt judge controlled by Julio Ardiente. They work together to put Julio back in power. He later reveals the crimes of the Ardientes after the popular uprising.
- Michael Flores as NBI Agent Noel Salonga: He is Lily Cruz/Ivy Aguas’ contact in the NBI. He helps Lily capture Helena and her group. He tries to arrest Julio and Emilia after their atrocities is revealed to the people. He helps Lily Cruz infiltrate the Ardientes' final hideout.

=== Recurring ===
Actor	Character	Seasons			
Actor	Character	1	2	3	4
Raul Montessa	Fernan Naig	Recurring	Recurring	Recurring	Recurring
Vivo Ouano	Raul's ally		Recurring	Recurring	Recurring
June Macasaet	Raul's ally		Recurring	Recurring	Recurring
Prince De Guzman	Raul's ally		Recurring	Recurring	Recurring
Angelo Ilagan	Raul's ally		Recurring	Recurring	Recurring
Menggie Cobarubias	Atty. Sebastian			Recurring	
Justin Cuyugan	Mr. Paterno			Recurring	Recurring
Alex Castro	Rufo Cruz			Recurring	
Zeus Collins	Damian's ally			Recurring	Recurring
Luis Hontiveros	Damian's ally			Recurring	Recurring
Epy Quizon	Stefano dela Torre				Recurring

- Raul Montessa as Fernan Naig: Nimfa’s father and president of the cooperative. He helps Diego's campaign in spite of Nimfa’s connivance with Emilia.
- Vivo Ouano as Raul's ally
- June Macasaet as Raul's ally
- Prince De Guzman as Raul's ally
- Angelo Ilagan as Raul's ally
- Menggie Cobarubias as Atty. Sebastian: A lawyer.
- Justin Cuyugan as Mr. Paterno: Mercedes’ puppet used to infiltrate and destroy Lily Cruz by letting Myla, disguised as a potential investor, enter the offices of Aguas Realty and detonate a bomb. He is later killed on Red Dragon's orders to silence him.
- Alex Castro as Rufo Cruz: Known as the right-hand man of Jaguar, for both Damian and Raul. He is loyal to whoever assumes the Jaguar post. Julio bribes him to betray Jaguar but is killed by Raul when he learns of his betrayal from Jepoy.
- Zeus Collins as Damian's ally
- Luis Hontiveros as Damian's ally
- Epy Quizon as Stefano dela Torre: The Triad’s representative one of Lily's secret allies and Emilia's accomplice in all negotiations with the various syndicates, in the flashback scene he presents to Lily the evidences behind the murder of Red Dragon. He is killed by Julio in his attempt to take over the syndicate.

=== Guest ===
Actor	Character	Seasons			
Actor	Character	1	2	3	4
Johnny Revilla	—	Guest			
Precious Lara Quigaman	Rosario	Guest			
Carla Martinez	Hon. Alice Rivera	Guest			
Uncredited	Maria	Guest			
Rodolfo Madrigal Jr.	Portunato "Pot" David		Guest		
Anthony Taberna	Himself		Guest		
Master Hanz Cua	Himself		Guest		
Dolores Bunoan	Belen		Guest		
Rolly Innocencio	Witness		Guest		
Juan Rodrigo	Ramon Montoya			Guest	
Victor Silayan	Enrique			Guest	
Christopher Roxas	Apollo			Guest	
Matrica Mae Centino	Montona			Guest	
Allan Paule	Ben				Guest
Gio Alvarez	Ronald				Guest
Tess Antonio	Edna				Guest
Gerald Pizarras	Efren				Guest
Tony Mabesa	Priest				Guest

- Johnny Revilla
- Precious Lara Quigaman as Rosario, Diego's biological mother and Raul's mistress who was killed by Emilia.
- Carla Martinez as Hon. Alice Rivera: A court judge who handles a case against the Ardiente family. She is killed on Julio's orders after she refuses to drop the case.
- Anthony Taberna as himself: The host of Arnaldo and Diego's political debate.
- Master Hanz Cua as himself: A real-life astrologer who is hired by Emilia to cleanse the Ardiente residence after she believes that she is haunted by Lily's ghost after burying her alive.
- Dolores Bunoan as Belen: Raul's aunt who is entrusted by him to take of Camia/Jasmin unaware of her real identity. She is ordered killed by Emilia after she discovers her role in hiding Camia
- Rolly Innocencio as Witness: A witness in a case against the Ardiente family.
- Juan Rodrigo as Ramon Montoya: Helena's father and the leader of a syndicate. Young Julio asked him to support his candidacy but he refused. As a result of Helena's betrayal, Julio kills him and takes over his syndicate. His death pushes Helena to get revenge on Julio.
- Victor Silayan as Enrique: The man whom Ramon wanted for Helena instead of Julio. He attempted to date Helena, but she was in love with Julio. He is killed, along with Ramon, when Julio infiltrates their hideout.
- Christopher Roxas as Apollo: The head manager of Helena's club, Club Dragonfly. He is killed by Helena after failing to prevent a raid by Lily and Diego.
- Matrica Mae Centino as Montona: Floor manager in Club Dragonfly.
- Allan Paule as Ben: A person who was bribed by Julio to tell him all of the plans of Diego and Lily to destroy him. He was killed by Julio after he placed a scorpion in his bag of cash.
- Gio Alvarez as Ronald: A victim of the Ardientes who forcibly disappeared his family. He supports Lily and Diego's campaign in removing the Ardiente family from power.
- Tess Antonio as Edna: Ronald's wife and another victim of the Ardientes who forcibly disappeared his parents. She, Ana, and many other discovered the mass grave on the Ardiente's killings. She supports Lily and Diego's campaign in getting justice for all of the evil deeds of the Ardientes.
- Gerald Pizarras as Efren: Another victim of the Ardiente family. He supports Lily and Diego's campaign in getting justice for all the crimes of the Ardientes.
- Tony Mabesa as the Priest who officiates Lily and Diego's wedding.

=== Special guest ===
Actor	Character	Seasons			
Actor	Character	1	2	3	4
Priscilla Meirelles	Prianka Patil-Aguas	Special guest			
Pinky Amador	Esmeralda De Guzman-Ardiente	Special guest			
Xyriel Manabat	Young Lily Cruz / Ivy P. Aguas	Special guest			
Ejay Falcon	Young Julio Ardiente	Special guest			
Patrick Garcia	Young Julio Ardiente			Special guest	
Jesse James Ongteco	Young Diego Torillo	Special guest			
Izzy Canillo	Young Arnaldo Ardiente Torillo	Special guest			
Azi Villanueva	Young Jepoy Madrigal	Special guest			
Kyline Alcantara	Young Emilia Ardiente	Special guest			
Jennica Garcia	Young Emilia Ardiente		Special guest		
Joseph Andre Garcia	Young Raul Torillo		Special guest		
Mutya Orquia	Young Rosana "Ana" Navarro		Special guest		
Ellen Adarna	Young Esmeralda De Guzman-Ardiente		Special guest		
Emmanuelle Vera	Young Helena Montoya			Special guest	
Emmanuelle Vera	Young Red Dragon			Special guest	
Karylle	Venus				Special guest

- Priscilla Meirelles as Prianka Patil-Aguas: The woman who adopted Lily. The CEO of Aguas Realty, she is haunted by the murders of her husband and daughter and shares an affinity with Lily. She recreates her identity as Ivy Aguas and helps her prepare her revenge on the Ardientes. Upon her death from ovarian cancer, she leaves Ivy as her heiress.
- Pinky Amador as Esmeralda De Guzman-Ardiente: Julio's late wife and Emilia's adoptive mother.
- Xyriel Manabat as Young Lily Cruz / Ivy Aguas.
- Ejay Falcon / Patrick Garcia as Young Julio Ardiente.
- Jesse James Ongteco as Young Diego Torillo.
- Izzy Canillo as Young Arnaldo Ardiente Torillo.
- Azi Villanueva as Young Jepoy Madrigal.
- Kyline Alcantara / Jennica Garcia as Young Emilia Ardiente.
- Joseph Andre Garcia as Young Raul Torillo.
- Mutya Orquia as Young Rosana "Ana" Navarro.
- Ellen Adarna as Young Esmeralda De Guzman-Ardiente.
- Emmanuelle Vera as Young Helena Montoya / Red Dragon.
- Karylle as Venus: The villainous adoptive daughter of Red Dragon who Helena abandons after learning that her real daughter, Emilia, is alive. In the finale, she assumes the title of Red Dragon and tortures Julio to death with a blowtorch. Incidentally, she is the real-life daughter of Zsa Zsa Padilla, who plays Red Dragon in the series
