= Wildflower season 1 =

Wildflower
- Season 1
- First version of Season 1's title card
- Starring: Maja Salvador; Tirso Cruz III; Aiko Melendez; Sunshine Cruz; Wendell Ramos; Joseph Marco; Vin Abrenica; RK Bagatsing
- No. of episodes: 73

Release
- Original network: ABS-CBN
- Original release: February 13 – May 26, 2017

Season chronology
- Next → Season 2

The first season of Wildflower, a Philippine revenge drama television series on ABS-CBN, premiered on February 13, 2017 on ABS-CBN's Primetime Bida evening block and worldwide on The Filipino Channel and concluded on May 26, 2017, with a total of 73 episodes. The series stars the Dance Princess Maja Salvador, as Lily Cruz and Ivy Aguas, together with an ensemble cast consisting Tirso Cruz III, Aiko Melendez, Sunshine Cruz, and Wendell Ramos.

The first season of Wildflower chronicles the life of Lily Cruz, a girl whose parents were murdered by Emilia Ardiente, the matriarch of the Aridente clan. She was almost murdered, too, but managed to escape. Lily was adopted by Prianka Aguas, a billionaire businesswoman and philanthropist, and changed her identity to Ivy Aguas. After the death of Prianka, Lily returns to Poblacion Ardiente as Ivy Aguas, and this time stronger, braver, and ready to pursue her plans to avenge the deaths of her parents. She creates chaos in the family, while portraying as an ally to them, and also manipulating them.

== Plot ==
This story follows Lily Cruz (Maja Salvador), a beautiful and smart heiress who wants justice for her parents’ deaths by seeking revenge against the evil Ardiente family, a powerful political dynasty in the fictional province that bears their name.

Lily’s mother, Camia (Sunshine Cruz) is a school teacher and her father Dante (Christian Vasquez) is a public attorney. The Cruz family moves to the thriving and wealthy province of Poblacion Ardiente, where Dante gets an associate position in the Public Attorney’s office. Lily easily finds friends including Diego Torillo (Joseph Marco), the youngest son of the Ardiente family, one of the students who Camia tutors. The Ardiente family is the most powerful political dynasty in the province under the jurisdiction of Governor Julio Ardiente (Tirso Cruz III) and his daughter Emilia (Aiko Melendez), Mayor of the province. Emilia is married to businessman and known serial womanizer, Raul Torillo (Wendell Ramos). They have two sons, Arnaldo (RK Bagatsing) and Diego.

Complications follow when Raul is attracted to Camia. With the entitlement of the powerful, Raul assaults Camia prompting Dante to file rape charges against him. Unfortunately, the Ardientes do not take threats lightly. Lily's world crumbles when Dante suspiciously dies from a heart attack and she witnesses her mother’s rape. Though targeted to be killed herself, the assassins feel compassion for the 9 year old and frees her instead. Lily fends for herself in another city until a wealthy woman, Prianka Aguas (Priscilla Meirelles) rescues her from life in the streets. Prianka legally adopts Lily and raises her to become tough, providing her with the resources to seek justice for her parents. Prianka later died from ovarian cancer and Lily inherits her fortune and returns to Poblacion Ardiente as Ivy Aguas.

With a billion dollar conglomerate behind her, Ivy is a magnet for the Ardientes who are preparing their campaign for the gubernatorial and congressional reelections. Ivy is reacquainted with Diego, who turns out to be the bastard son of Raul. Nonetheless, they fall in love and Diego renounces his family.

== Cast and characters ==
=== Main ===
- Maja Salvador as Lily Cruz / Ivy P. Aguas
- Tirso Cruz III as Julio Ardiente
- Joseph Marco as Diego Torillo
- Vin Abrenica as Jepoy Madrigal
- RK Bagatsing as Arnaldo Ardiente-Torillo
- Aiko Melendez as Emilia Ardiente-Torillo
- Sunshine Cruz as Camia Delos Santos-Cruz / Jasmine
- Wendell Ramos as Raul Torillo and Fake Jaguar

=== Supporting ===
- Roxanne Barcelo as Natalie Alcantara
- Malou de Guzman as Lorena "Loring" Cervantes
- Bodjie Pascua as Leopnado "Pandoy" Cervantes
- Isay Alvarez-Seña as Clarita "Claire" De Guzman
- Ana Abad Santos as Carlotta Navarro
- Ingrid dela Paz as Nimfa Naig
- Chinggoy Alonzo as Pablo Alcantara
- Jett Pangan as William Alvarez
- Arnold Reyes as Arthur Vergara
- Sheila Valderrama as Atty. Georgina Fisher

=== Recurring ===
- Raul Montessa as Fernan Naig

=== Guest ===
- Johnny Revilla
- Precious Lara Quigaman as Rosario
- Carla Martinez as Hon. Alice Rivera
- Uncredited as Maria

=== Special guest ===
- Christian Vasquez as Atty. Dante Cruz
- Priscilla Meirelles as Prianka Aguas
- Pinky Amador as Esmeralda De Guzman-Ardiente
- Xyriel Manabat as Young Lily Cruz / Ivy P. Aguas
- Ejay Falcon as Young Julio Ardiente
- Jesse James Ongteco as Young Diego Torillo
- Azi Villanueva as Young Jepoy Madrigal
- Izzy Canillo as Young Arnaldo Ardiente Torillo
