= Wildflower season 4 =

Wildflower
- Season 4
- Third version of Season 4's title card
- Starring: Maja Salvador; Tirso Cruz III; Zsa Zsa Padilla; Aiko Melendez; Joseph Marco; Sunshine Cruz; Wendell Ramos; RK Bagatsing; Vin Abrenica; Yen Santos; Christian Vasquez; Roxanne Barcelo; Miko Raval
- No. of episodes: 50

Release
- Original network: ABS-CBN
- Original release: December 4, 2017 – February 9, 2018

Season chronology
- ← Previous; Season 3

The fourth and final season of Wildflower, a Philippine revenge drama television series that aired on ABS-CBN and worldwide on The Filipino Channel on December 4, 2017, and concluded on February 9, 2018, with a total of 50 episodes.

The series stars Maja Salvador, as Lily Cruz, together with an ensemble cast consisting of Tirso Cruz III, Zsa Zsa Padilla, Aiko Melendez, Joseph Marco, Sunshine Cruz, Wendell Ramos, RK Bagatsing, Vin Abrenica, Yen Santos, Christian Vasquez, Roxanne Barcelo, and Miko Raval.

== Plot ==
Taking advantage of Helena's temporary weakness, the predatory Julio kills her to take over her vast operations under the Asian syndicate's protection. However, he quickly learns that it is not as easy without the triad’s secret password, which Helena leaves with Emilia.

In the aftermath of Arnaldo's suicide, Lily and Diego try to pick up the pieces of their lives, but Julio and Emilia are enemies not yet ready to give up. In the mental asylum, Emilia is haunted by the evil ghosts of Helena and Arnaldo exhorting her to avenge their deaths by killing Lily and Diego. Consumed with grief, Julio tries to stir up public outrage towards the Torillos but other than the loyalists. Meanwhile, Emilia rises from her insanity and obtains the support of the Asian syndicate with the password her mother gave her.

Meanwhile, a group of citizens claiming to be families of victims of the Ardientes locate the biggest and most solid evidence that can finally bring the Ardientes to answer for their crimes. The group approach the Torillos with information about a mass grave the Ardientes began using in the mid-50s when the family first seized power. Unlike the past witnesses who were killed, the mass graves have no living witnesses to silence but hundreds of human remains to explain for.

The group, along with Jepoy (Vin Abrenica) and Ana (Yen Santos) find the graves and thousands of skeletal remains. Jepoy and Ana contact local media about the mass grave and stirs up the neighbors to do the same. The media frenzy covering the atrocities committed by the Ardientes emboldens whistleblowers and other victims to speak up, including former accomplices and political supporters like Natalie (Roxanne Barcelo), ex-bodyguards, former assassins, Judge Lustre. At this moment the neighbors and even the defecting Ardiente loyalists staging up a strike on the city.

At the Ardiente's, Lily is captured by Julio and dragged to the town square to be executed. Julio and Emilia parade Lily through a gauntlet of loyalists hurling insults and abuses at her. Diego saves her and the execution attempt goes into a halt just before the loyalist mob attempts to execute her.

Videos of the mass grave are repeatedly shown on national television and goes viral in social media. Public outrage against the brutality of the Ardientes reach beyond the Ardiente's bailiwick and the family loses the support of powerful officials who backed them and allowed them to rule with impunity. A popular uprising topples the powerful family. With solid evidence and witnesses no longer afraid to speak out, the people of Ardiente file cases of multiple murder, frustrated homicide, Estafa and plunder that would send them to prison for a long time, but Julio and Emilia escape capture. Julio vows revenge.

While authorities search for them, the province celebrates a new era under the governorship of Diego Torillo. Their joy does not last long when Julio assassinates Diego with a sniper rifle, and escape once again to a Triad safe house. Diego does not survive and the entire province mourns his death. Julio and Emilia learn that the Triad is handing Red Dragon’s operations to Emilia. This does not mean anything to Julio who kills Stefano (Epi Quizon), the Triad’s representative. Emilia finally realizes her father’s direct hand in the murders of her aunt and mother, and that he never respected her as an equal.

With intel gathered by Arthur, Lily works with the NBI authorities led by Agent Salonga (Michael Flores) and successfully raid the safe house where the Ardientes and the Triad are gathered. As Lily tries to stop Julio from escaping, Emilia comes face to face with her father, shooting him several times until he dies.

Diego's campaign promises: Peace, Hope and Love finally comes to Bagong Ardiente. Emilia's gunshot wounds severs her spine, paralyzes her and she serves her time in prison. Marlon becomes the Mayor of Bagong Ardiente and Lily takes over Diego's post as the Governor, moving on to Senator and finally as President-elect of the Philippines with a landslide victory. Camia and Damian (Christian Vasquez) wed after his release from prison. Lily visits Emilia in prison extending an olive branch and forgives her.

Later, in a laboratory at an unspecified place, Julio is shown to be half-alive, having survived his gunshot injury and being connected to an intravenous solution. A gang led by Helena's adopted daughter Venus (Karylle), enters and tortures Julio to death in their actions of playing God.

== Cast and characters ==
=== Main ===
- Maja Salvador as Lily Cruz-Torillo
- Tirso Cruz III as Julio Ardiente
- Zsa Zsa Padilla as Helena Montoya / Red Dragon
- Aiko Melendez as Emilia Ardiente-Torillo
- Joseph Marco as Diego Torillo
- Sunshine Cruz as Camia Delos Santos-Cruz
- Wendell Ramos as Raul Torillo / Fake Jaguar
- RK Bagatsing as Arnaldo Ardiente Torillo
- Vin Abrenica as Jepoy Madrigal
- Yen Santos as Rosana "Ana" Navarro-Madrigal
- Christian Vasquez as Damian Cruz / Real Jaguar (Note: Christian Vasquez portrays two characters: Attorney Dante Cruz and Damian "Jaguar" Cruz. Damian is a main character and is credited as a main character as per the opening sequence. Dante was a special guest character in book 1; and reappeared again as a special guest in book 4. Dante is a special guest character, while Damian is a main character. The two characters are in separate credit sections.)
- Roxanne Barcelo as Natalie Alcantara
- Miko Raval as Marlon Cabrera

=== Supporting ===
- Arnold Reyes as Arthur Vergara
- Sheila Valderrama as Atty. Georgina Fisher
- Bobby Andrews as Mateo Ruiz
- Dawn Chang as Maila Lomeda / Ms. Moran
- Jeffrey Santos as Col. Magbanua
- Jong Cuenco as Judge Manuel Lustre
- Michael Flores as NBI Agent Noel Salonga

=== Recurring ===
- Raul Montessa as Fernan Naig
- Vivo Ouano as Raul's ally
- June Macasaet as Raul's ally
- Prince De Guzman as Raul's ally
- Angelo Ilagan as Raul's ally
- Justin Cuyugan as Mr. Paterno
- Zeus Collins as Damian's ally
- Luis Hontiveros as Damian's ally
- Epi Quizon as Stefano dela Torre

=== Guest ===
- Allan Paule as Ben
- Gio Alvarez as Ronald
- Tess Antonio as Edna
- Gerald Pizarras as Efren

=== Special guest ===
- Christian Vasquez as Atty. Dante Cruz
- Ana Abad Santos as Carlotta Navarro
- Karylle as Venus
