= Wildflower season 3 =

Wildflower
- Season 3
- First version of Season 3's title card
- Starring: Maja Salvador; Tirso Cruz III; Aiko Melendez; Sunshine Cruz; Wendell Ramos; Vin Abrenica; RK Bagatsing; Joseph Marco
- No. of episodes: 80

Release
- Original network: ABS-CBN
- Original release: August 14 – December 1, 2017

Season chronology
- ← Previous; Season 2 Next → Season 4

The third season of Wildflower, a Philippine revenge drama television series on ABS-CBN, premiered on August 14, 2017 and concluded on December 1, 2017, with a total of 80 episodes.

Season three stars Maja Salvador, as Lily Cruz and Ivy Aguas, together with an ensemble cast consisting of Tirso Cruz III, Aiko Melendez, Sunshine Cruz, Wendell Ramos, Vin Abrenica, RK Bagatsing, and Joseph Marco.

== Plot ==
When Ivy reveals her real identity as Lily Cruz after she cripples the Ardiente's powerful influence, a new enemy surfaces. The enemy is Julio's first wife and Emilia's mother, Helena Montoya. Also known in the criminal world as Red Dragon, Helena controls the country’s largest crime syndicate operations. Notwithstanding the sinister résumé, Helena is no match to Ivy's cunning and superior skills, and after several conflicts, Lily brings Red Dragon's operations to a halt too.

== Cast and characters ==
=== Main ===
- Maja Salvador as Lily Cruz / Ivy P. Aguas
- Tirso Cruz III as Julio Ardiente
- Aiko Melendez as Emilia Ardiente-Torillo
- Sunshine Cruz as Camia Delos Santos-Cruz
- Wendell Ramos as Raul Torillo / Fake Jaguar
- Vin Abrenica as Jepoy Madrigal
- RK Bagatsing as Arnaldo Ardiente Torillo
- Joseph Marco as Diego Torillo

=== Supporting ===
- Christian Vasquez as Damian Cruz / Real Jaguar
- Roxanne Barcelo as Natalie Alcantara
- Malou de Guzman as Lorena "Loring" Cervantes
- Bodjie Pascua as Leopando "Pandoy" Cervantes
- Isay Alvarez-Seña as Clarita "Claire" De Guzman
- Arnold Reyes as Arthur Vergara
- Sheila Valderrama as Atty. Georgina Fisher
- Yen Santos as Rosana "Ana" Navarro / Fake Lily Cruz
- Miko Raval as Marlon Cabrera
- Richard Quan as Col. Jose Sanggano
- Bobby Andrews as Mateo Ruiz
- Alma Concepcion as Divine Oytengco
- Maika Rivera as Stefanie Oytengco
- Mark Rafael Bringas as John Gonzalez
- Biboy Ramirez as Jude Asuncion
- Nina Ricci Alagao as Mercedes Palacio
- Jun Urbano as Ramon Lim (North)
- Bernard Laxa as Silverio Victoria (East)
- Bong Regala as Carlos Isidro (West)
- Matthew Mendoza as Oscar Evangelista (South)
- Dawn Chang as Maila Lomeda / Ms. Moran
- Jeffrey Santos as Col. Magbanua
- Jong Cuenco as Judge Manuel Lustre
- Michael Flores as NBI Agent Noel Salonga

=== Recurring ===
- Raul Montessa as Fernan Naig
- Vivo Ouano as Raul's ally
- June Macasaet as Raul's ally
- Prince De Guzman as Raul's ally
- Angelo Ilagan as Raul's ally
- Menggie Cobarubias as Atty. Sebastian
- Justin Cuyugan as Mr. Paterno
- Alex Castro as Rufo Cruz
- Zeus Collins as Damian's ally
- Luis Hontiveros as Damian's ally
- Lito Pimentel as Cong. Ruel Cansiao
- Richard Lopez
- Alvin Nakassi
- Vanessa Wright
- Kris Janson

=== Guest ===
- Juan Rodrigo as Ramon Montoya
- Victor Silayan as Enrique
- Christopher Roxas as Apollo
- Matrica Mae Centino as Montona

=== Special guest ===
- Zsa Zsa Padilla as Helena Montoya / Red Dragon
- Patrick Garcia as Young Julio Ardiente
- Emmanuelle Vera as Young Helena Montoya / Red Dragon
