= Wildflower season 2 =

Wildflower
- Season 2
- First version of Season 2's title card
- Starring: Maja Salvador; Tirso Cruz III; Aiko Melendez; Sunshine Cruz; Wendell Ramos; Vin Abrenica; RK Bagatsing; Joseph Marco
- No. of episodes: 54

Release
- Original network: ABS-CBN
- Original release: May 29 – August 11, 2017

Season chronology
- ← Previous; Season 1 Next → Season 3

The second season of Wildflower, a Philippine revenge drama television series on ABS-CBN, premiered on May 29, 2017 on ABS-CBN's Primetime Bida evening block and worldwide on The Filipino Channel and concluded on August 11, 2017, with a total of 54 episodes. The series stars the Dance Princess Maja Salvador, as Lily Cruz and Ivy Aguas, together with an ensemble cast consisting of Tirso Cruz III, Aiko Melendez, Sunshine Cruz, Wendell Ramos, Vin Abrenica, RK Bagatsing, and Joseph Marco.

== Plot ==
Ivy (Maja Salvador) painstakingly executes her intricate plan to bring down the Ardientes: First, Ivy seduces their weakest link, Arnaldo (RK Bagatsing). He becomes obsessed with her while she drives him crazy until he finally commits suicide in front of Lily at the resort where the newly married Torillos are honeymooning. Second, she ingratiates herself with Emilia (Aiko Melendez) and then exposes her for plunder, stripping her of her position. After several retaliatory attempts by Emilia against Ivy fails, Emilia is committed to a psychiatric facility; Third, she unseats Julio Ardiente (Tirso Cruz III) from his reelected Governor seat and weakens his powerhold in the province and then robs him of the only person he loves, his grandson Arnoldo. Ivy steadily chips away at what once was the Ardientes' impregnable wall allowing them to rule with impunity.

== Cast and characters ==
=== Main ===
- Maja Salvador as Lily Cruz / Ivy P. Aguas
- Tirso Cruz III as Julio Ardiente
- Aiko Melendez as Emilia Ardiente-Torillo
- Sunshine Cruz as Camia Delos Santos-Cruz
- Wendell Ramos as Raul Torillo / Fake Jaguar
- Vin Abrenica as Jepoy Madrigal
- RK Bagatsing as Arnaldo Ardiente Torillo
- Joseph Marco as Diego Torillo

=== Supporting ===
- Roxanne Barcelo as Natalie Alcantara
- Malou de Guzman as Lorena "Loring" Cervantes
- Bodjie Pascua as Leopando "Pandoy" Cervantes
- Isay Alvarez-Seña as Clarita "Claire" De Guzman
- Ana Abad Santos as Carlotta Navarro
- Ingrid dela Paz as Nimfa Naig
- Arnold Reyes as Arthur Vergara
- Sheila Valderrama as Atty. Georgina Fisher
- Yen Santos as Rosana "Ana" Navarro / Fake Lily Cruz
- Miko Raval as Marlon Cabrera

=== Recurring ===
- Raul Montessa as Fernan Naig
- Vivo Ouano as Raul's ally
- June Macasaet as Raul's ally
- Prince De Guzman as Raul's ally
- Angelo Ilagan as Raul's ally

=== Guest ===
- Rodolfo Madrigal Jr. as Portunato "Pot" David
- Anthony Taberna as Himself
- Dolores Bunoan as Belen
- Rolly Innocencio as Witness

=== Special guest ===
- Kyline Alcantara / Jennica Garcia as Young Emilia Ardiente
- Joseph Andre Garcia as Young Raul Torillo
- Mutya Orquia as Young Rosana "Ana" Navarro
- Ellen Adarna as Young Esmeralda De Guzman-Ardiente
