= Batang Bibbo! =

Philippine television infotainment show

- Title card
- Genre: Infotainment
- Developed by: Auggie Rivera
- Directed by: Tonipet Gaba
- Presented by: Roxanne Barcelo
- Narrated by: Roxanne Barcelo
- Opening theme: "Batang Bibbo" by Roxanne Barcelo
- Country of origin: Philippines
- Original language: Tagalog
- No. of episodes: 55

Production
- Executive producers: Jerome Ong; Joy Madrigal
- Camera setup: Multiple-camera setup
- Running time: 30 minutes
- Production companies: GMA News and Public Affairs; CDO Foodsphere

Original release
- Network: GMA Network
- Release: November 8, 2008 – July 9, 2009

Batang Bibbo! (transl. energetic kid!) is a Philippine television infotainment children show broadcast by GMA Network. Hosted by Roxanne Barcelo, it premiered on November 8, 2008. The show concluded on November 21, 2009, with a total of 55 episodes.

== Overview ==
A weekly 30-minute educational show geared for Filipino preschool children ages three to six years old. It aims to develop the social skills and language development of children through entertaining and enriching methods that are curriculum-based, age appropriate and culturally enriching.

The show featured puppets, Bi and Bo, Tsing and Gong in a magical learning place called Bibbolandia where they will meet new friends, learn new things and develop new skills. They are joined by the friendly Ate Anne (Roxanne Barcelo) who will help them solve simple problems and take them to new worlds of learning and discovery through her fascinating songs and stories.

Combining puppetry, songs, animation, storytelling and live action, the show promotes the proper use of Filipino language. It will also highlight constructive interpersonal skills like sharing, helping, taking turns, making friends, confidence, honesty, respect for diversity, sportsmanship and other social skills.

== Hosts ==
- Roxanne Barcelo as Anne
- Renz Valerio
- Franchesca Salcedo
- Angeli Nicole Sanoy

== Ratings ==
According to AGB Nielsen Philippines' Mega Manila household television ratings, the final episode of Batang Bibbo! scored a 10% rating.

== Accolades ==
Accolades received by Batang Bibbo!
Year	Award	Category	Recipient	Result	Ref.
2009	Anak TV Seal Awards	Most Well-Liked TV Program	Batang Bibbo!	Included	
2009	23rd PMPC Star Awards for Television	Best Children Show	Batang Bibbo!	Nominated	
2009	23rd PMPC Star Awards for Television	Best Children Show Host	Roxanne Barcelo	Nominated	
2010	24th PMPC Star Awards for Television	Best Children Show	Batang Bibbo!	Nominated	
2010	24th PMPC Star Awards for Television	Best Children Show Host	Roxanne Barcelo	Nominated	
