= Happy Hearts (2007 film) =

- Happy Hearts DVD cover
- Directed by: Joel C. Lamangan
- Written by: Dado Lumibao
- Produced by: Lily Y. Monteverde
- Starring: Shaina Magdayao; Rayver Cruz
- Cinematography: Jun Aves
- Edited by: Marya Ignacio
- Music by: Vincent de Jesus
- Production company: Regal Films
- Distributed by: Regal Films Distribution
- Release date: March 14, 2007
- Running time: 97 minute
- Country: Philippines
- Language: Filipino

Happy Hearts is a 2007 Philippine romantic comedy film. Directed by Joel Lamangan, it stars Shaina Magdayao and Rayver Cruz.

== Synopsis ==
Alvin returns to the Philippines with his mother to see his father Enrico, a respected professor of an exclusive boys school and a secret lover of Louie, his godfather. He meets and falls in love with Kristine, a beautiful and rich young woman whose father is the headmaster of the same school with his father. During his stay, he discovers that Kristine father has a very strict rules of who she can see and date.

== Cast ==
- Shaina Magdayao as Kristine
- Rayver Cruz as Alvin
- Bebe Gandanghari as Enrico
- Wendell Ramos as Louie
- Jean Garcia as Sarah
- Tirso Cruz III as Mr. Ricafuente
- Giselle Sanchez as Tweety
- Jill Yulo as Margot
- Alwyn Uytingco as Miggy
