= CDO Foodsphere =

Philippine meat processing company

Foodsphere, Inc.
- Logo
- Formerly: CDO Food Products (1975–1981)
- Type: Private
- Industry: Food processing
- Founded: June 25, 1975; 51 years ago
- Founder: Corazon Dayro Ong; Jose Ong
- Headquarters: 560 West Service Road, Paso de Blas, Valenzuela, Metro Manila, Philippines
- Area served: Philippines
- Key people: Jerome Ong (President)
- Products: Hotdogs, sausages, canned tuna, canned meat, ham, bacon, delicacies, sweet preserves and processed cheeses
- Number of employees: 1,431 (2022)
- Divisions: Odyssey Foundation, Inc.
- Website: www.cdo.com.ph

Foodsphere, Inc. (Note: The company is registered as Foodsphere, Inc., and uses CDO Foodsphere, Inc. as its public-facing name.), commonly known as CDO Foodsphere, Inc. or simply CDO, is a Philippine meat processing company based in Valenzuela, Metro Manila.

== History ==
The company was founded by Corazon Dayro Ong and her husband Jose Ong on June 25, 1975, as a small business at their residence in Valenzuela. Initially known as CDO Food Products, the name "CDO" was derived from Corazon Dayro Ong's initials. With a ₱60,000 bank loan, the family converted their residence into a small factory, initially producing longanisa, tocino, and siopao with longanisa filling.

In 1981, the company was registered as Foodsphere Inc., with CDO as its flagship brand.

It opened its first modern factory in Canumay, still in Valenzuela in 1990 amidst the early 1990s financial crisis. It opened its second factory in 1997, and they started their first canning line and launched CDO Karne Norte.

In June 2009, it opened its 9 hectares (22 acres) factory in Brgy. Bulihan, Malvar, Batangas.

During the COVID-19 pandemic, CDO Foodsphere launched the Million Meats Project to provide food assistance among Filipino families affected by the crisis. The project aimed to produce and distribute one million cans of CDO meat loaf to local communities. Initial distributions took place in Malvar, Batangas, and eventually expanded to other areas, reaching approximately 57,000 households in Valenzuela City and nearly 4,000 in Malabon City.

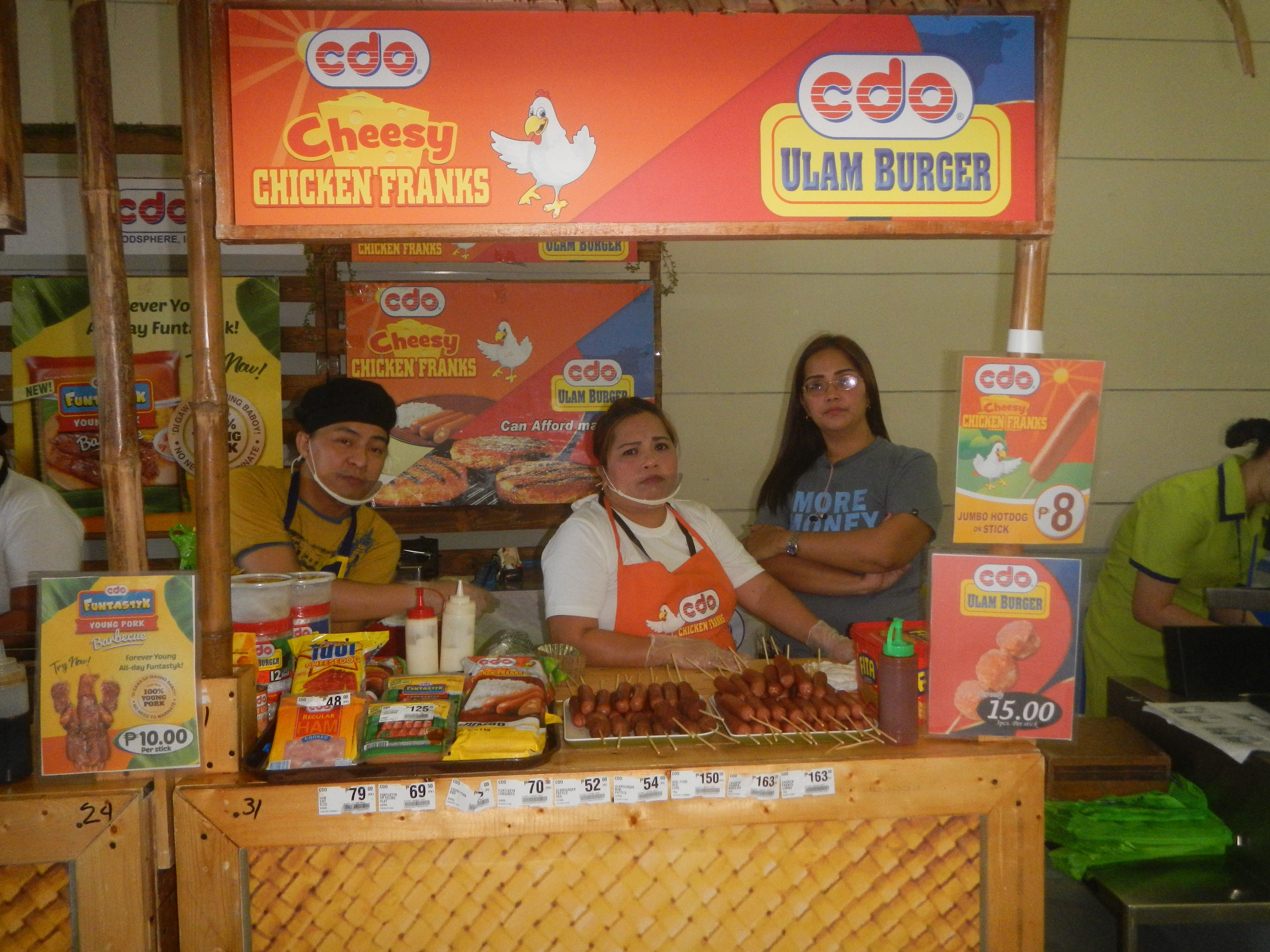
Food booth selling CDO products.
