= Aiko Melendez =

Filipina actress and politician (born 1975)

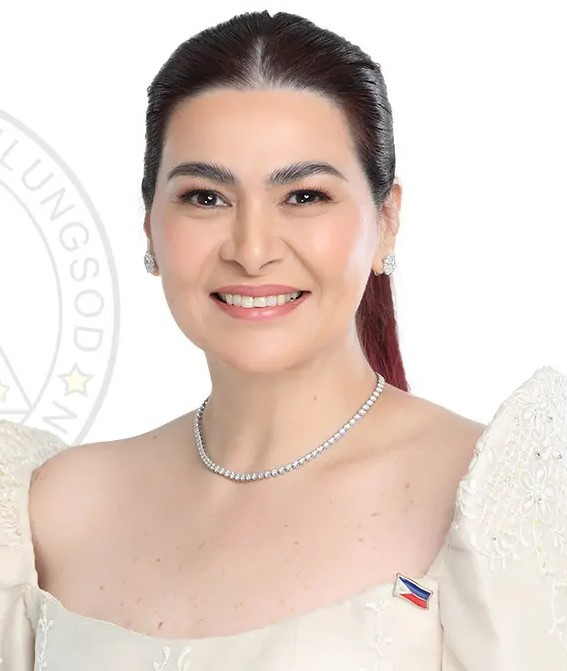
- Official portrait, 2025

Member of the Quezon City Council
- Incumbent
- Assumed office June 30, 2022
- Constituency: 5th district
- In office June 30, 2001 – June 30, 2010
- Constituency: 2nd district

Personal details
- Born: Mary Aiko Shimoji Melendez; December 16, 1975 (age 50) Quezon City, Philippines
- Party: SBP (2024–present)
- Other political affiliations: Nacionalista (2021–2024); PMP (2009–2021); Lakas (2001–2009)
- Spouses: Jomari Yllana (m. 2000; ann. 2005) Martin Jickain (m. 2006; ann. 2010)
- Children: 2
- Occupation: Actress and politician

Mary Aiko Shimoji Melendez (Tagalog: [ˈaɪkɔ mɛˈlɛndɛs]; born December 16, 1975) is a Filipino actress and politician. She began her career as a child actress and later became a romantic lead in the 1990s. She achieved newfound fame playing secondary dramatic roles in film and television in the succeeding decades and has since garnered various accolades, including a Luna Award and two Manila Film Festival Awards, in addition to nominations for five FAMAS Awards. She has served as a councilor of Quezon City from the 5th district since 2022, a position she previously held from the 2nd district from 2001 to 2010.

== Career ==
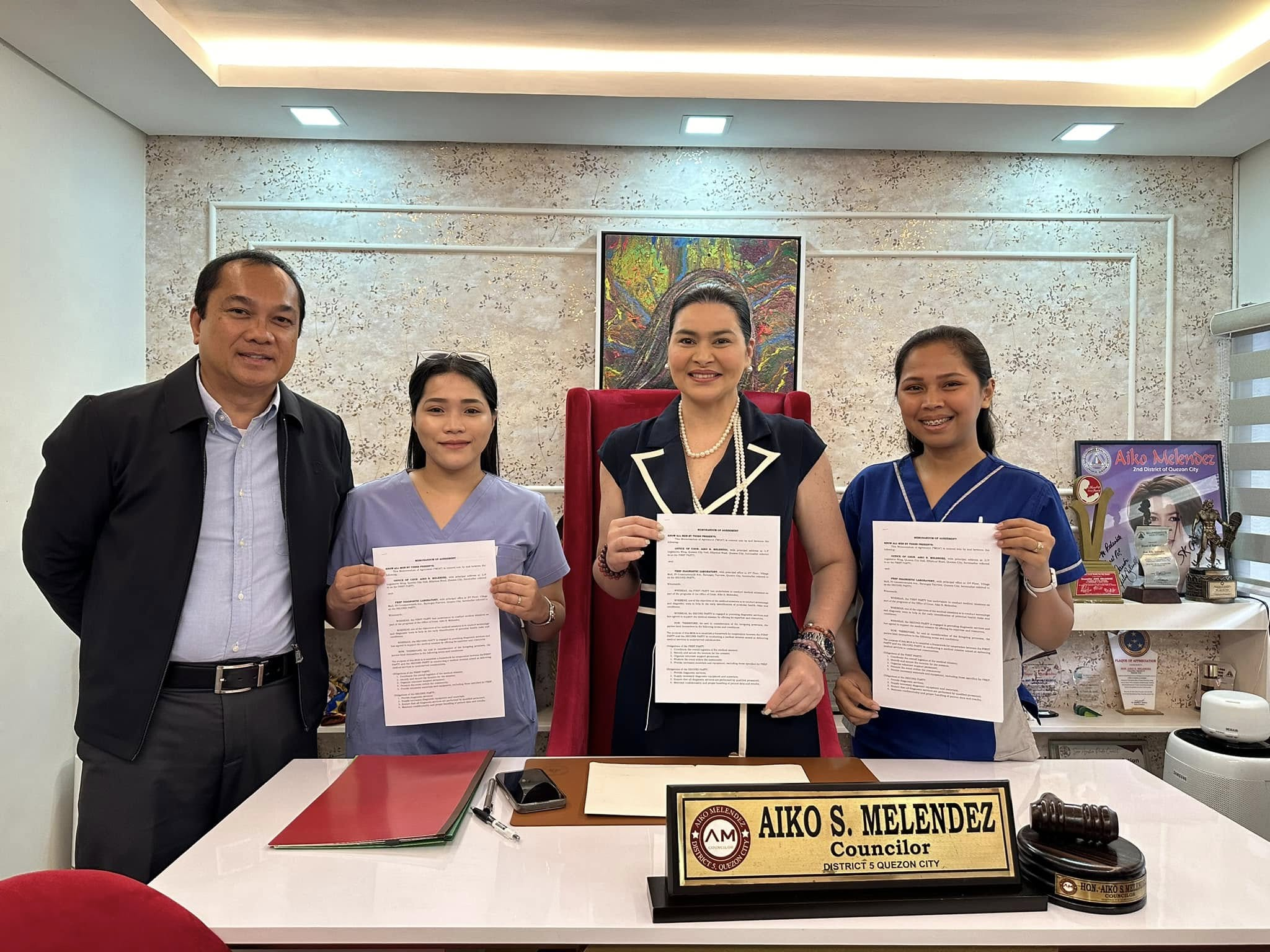
Melendez with selected members of the House of Representatives (2024)

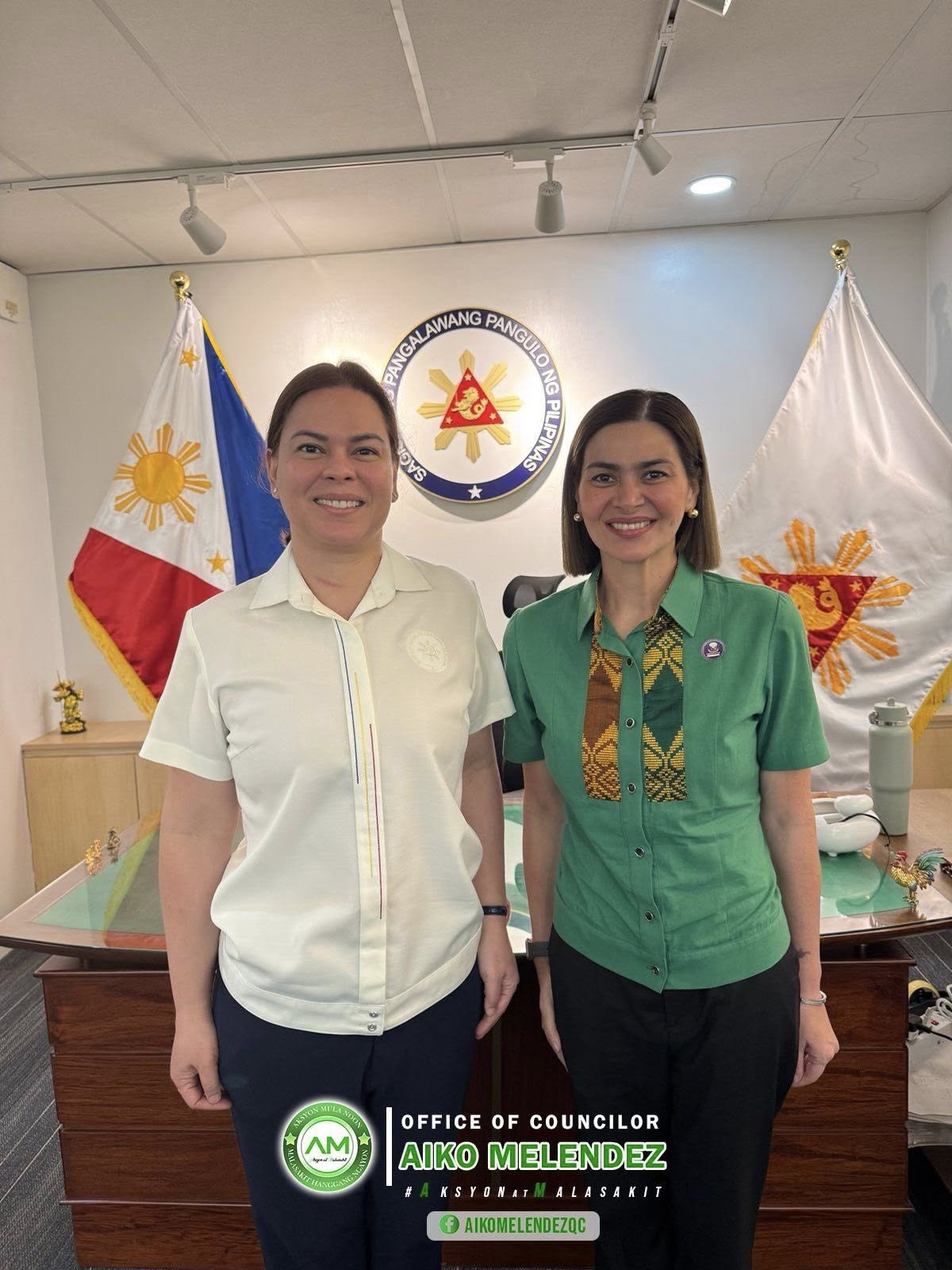
Melendez (right) and Vice President Sara Duterte (left) on January 13, 2026

Melendez was discovered in the late 1980s and signed a contract with Regal Films, becoming one of their 'Regal Babies'.

In 2001, Melendez ran for councilor of the 2nd district of Quezon City and won. She was reelected in 2004 and in 2007 and remained in office for 9 years until 2010. She ran for vice mayor of Quezon City in 2010 as the running mate of Mike Defensor, but lost to Joy Belmonte.

On October 22, 2007, Melendez appeared in the game show Kapamilya Deal or No Deal where she become the second celebrity contestant to win at least ₱1 million, though she missed out on winning the top prize of ₱3 million (then the top prize of that season), which was inside her briefcase. One year later on November 25, she partnered with Candy Pangilinan on the same show and also won the ₱1 million prize. Their win marked two firsts in Kapamilya Deal or No Deal's history: the first time that a team had won at least ₱1 million, and Melendez as the first (and currently the only) contestant to win ₱1 million in multiple runs.

She did several shows on GMA Network but most often appeared on ABS-CBN. In 2011, Aiko returned to ABS-CBN for an episode of Maalaala Mo Kaya and Reputasyon. In 2013, she was part of the TV series Apoy Sa Dagat. In 2015, Melendez played the role of Fionna Vargas in Inday Bote. In 2017, Melendez played the role of Emilia Ardiente in Wildflower. In 2018, Melendez played the role of Matadora/Bighani in Bagani. In 2019, Melendez returned to GMA Network to play a role in Prima Donnas.

Melendez ran for Quezon City councilor in 2022, this time at the 5th district, and won.

== Personal life ==
Her father, Spanish-Japanese Jimmy Melendez (born Jim Shinoji) was also an actor, and her mother, Elsie B. Castañeda, is Filipina with Japanese and Spanish ancestry. Her paternal half-brother, Jam Melendez, also entered showbusiness.

Melendez was married to actor Jomari Yllana from 2000 but separated after a year. They have a son named Andrei. Their marriage was annulled in 2005.

In 2006, Melendez married Martin Jickain, with whom she has a daughter named Marthena. However, their marriage was annulled in 2010.

Melendez dated Zambales's 1st district representative Jay Khonghun, from 2018 until their breakup in 2025. In 2026, she announced that she was dating a long-time friend, actor Onemig Bondoc.

In 2013, Melendez converted to Born Again Christianity.

In October 2026, she was engaged to Onemig Bondoc.

== Filmography ==
=== Film ===
Year	Title	Role
1982	Where Love Has Gone	Young Monica/Dominique
1982	Santa Claus Is Coming to Town	
1983	Don't Cry for Me, Papa	Tessie
1989	My Pretty Baby	Maria
1989	Romeo Loves Juliet ... But Their Families Hate Each Other!	Juliet
1989	Isang Araw Walang Diyos	Laya
1990	Trese	Tessa Encarnacion
1990	Last 2 Minutes	Akira
1990	Tora Tora, Bang Bang Bang	
1990	Nimfa	
1991	Underage Too	Aiko
1991	Gabo: Walang Patawad Kung Pumatay	May Anne/Meanne
1991	Kung Sino Pa Ang Minahal	Stephanie
1991	Emma Salazar Case	Arlene
1992	Ali in Wonderland	Kili kili
1992	Cornelia Ramos Story	Mei
1992	Boy Recto	Ester Legarda
1992	Guwapings: The First Adventure	
1992	Si Lucio at si Miguel: Hihintayin Kayo sa Langit	Rosanna
1992	Buddy en Sol (Sine Ito!)	Anna
1992	Unang Tibok ng Puso	Lena
1992	Shake, Rattle & Roll IV	Sister Mary John
1992	Kamay ni Kain	Rosenda
1992	Sonny Boy, Public Enemy Number 1 of Cebu City	Cristine
1992	Sinungaling Mong Puso	Anna
1993	Aguinaldo	Ka Melissa
1993	Dino... Abangan ang Susunod Na...	Claudine
1993	Ayoko na Sanang Magmahal	Maila
1993	Dugo ng Panday	Luna
1993	May Minamahal	Monica Fernandez
1994	Buhay ng Buhay Ko	Fatima
1994	Multo in the City	Mabel
1994	Ang Ika-Labing Isang Utos: Mahalin Mo, Asawa Mo	Solidad
1994	Maalaala Mo Kaya: The Movie	Ana
1994	Bawal Na Gamot	Shiela
1995	Sa'yo Lamang	Louella
1995	Bawal Na Gamot 2	Shiela/Marjorie
1995	Araw-araw, Gabi-gabi	Teresa
1995	Batang-X	Dr. Axis
1996	Mula Noon Hanggang Ngayon	Beverly
1996	Huling Sagupaan	Monica
1996	Kahit Kailan	Susan
1997	Atraso: Ang Taong may Kasalanan	Tessa Villanueva
1997	Kung Marunong Kang Magdasal, Umpisahan Mo Na	Cynthia
1998	Pagdating ng Panahon	
1998	Ikaw Pa Rin Ang Iibigin	Pia Tesoro
1999	Higit Pa Sa Buhay Ko	Marita Bernardo
2000	Mahal Kita, Walang Iwanan	Cynthia
2003	Filipinas	Vicky Filipinas
2009	Yaya and Angelina: The Spoiled Brat Movie	Mommy
2014	Asintado	Julia
2015	Etiquette for Mistresses	Adelle Ayson
2015	Everyday I Love You	Guada Locsin
2016	Barcelona: A Love Untold	Insiang
2017	Pwera Usog	Minda
2018	Rainbow's Sunset	Georgina
2021	Huwag Kang Lalabas	Espie
TBA	Mabuhay Aloha Mabuhay	Sara Duterte

=== Television ===
Year	Title	Role	Notes
1981	Anna Liza	–	
1989	Lovingly Yours, Helen	–	
1989–1995	Eat Bulaga!	Herself	Co-host
1990	Buddy en Sol	Toni / Tonette	
1992	Maalaala Mo Kaya	Cynthia	Episode: "Working Visa"
1993	The Maricel Drama Special	Armina	Episode: "Istranghera"
1994-95	Star Drama Theater Presents: Aiko	Various roles / Multiple characters	
1994	Star Drama Theater Presents: Aiko	Maira	Episode: "Kanya-Kanyang Mundo"
1994	Star Drama Theater Presents: Aiko	Arma	Episode: "Candidate No.5"
1994	Star Drama Theater Presents: Aiko	Ms. Marge Perea	Episode: "Magkakamukhang Mukha"
1994	Star Drama Theater Presents: Aiko	Janet / Jeanette	Episode: "Medalyang Ginto"
1994	Star Drama Theater Presents: Aiko	Jenny	Episode: "Magkadulong Bahaghari"
1994	Star Drama Theater Presents: Aiko	Kristine	Episode: "Package Deal"
1995	Star Drama Theater Presents: Aiko	Jennie	Episode: "Penpal"
1995	Star Drama Theater Presents: Aiko	Ina	Episode: "Kulay Putik ang Daan sa Langit"
1995	Star Drama Theater Presents: Aiko	Joy	Episode: "Baliktad Na, Tumbalik Pa"
1995	Star Drama Theater Presents: Aiko	Mariel	Episode: "Minsan Isang Panahon"
1995–1998	Bubble Gang	Herself	
1995	Maalaala Mo Kaya	Sonia	Episode: "Upos"
1997	Maalaala Mo Kaya	Shirley	Episode: "Munting bituin"
1999	Maalaala Mo Kaya	Estrella	Episode: "Ward 24"
2001	Maalaala Mo Kaya	Gina	Episode: "Condo Unit"
2002	Klasmayts		
2003	Maalaala Mo Kaya	Sonya	Episode: "Torotot"
2004	Yes, Yes Show!	–	
2006	Noel	–	
2007-08	Kapamilya Deal or No Deal	Herself/Contestant	
2008	Your Song	Marge Fernando	Episode: "Someone Like You"
2008	Maalaala Mo Kaya	Aurora	Episode: "Kanin"
2009	Talentadong Pinoy	Herself / Judge	
2010	Sine Novela: Basahang Ginto	Rosenda Montecillo	Recurring Role
2011	Maalaala Mo Kaya	Marivic	Episode: "TV"
2011–2012	Reputasyon	Catherine Espeleta-Villamayor / Connie Aragon	
2012	Nandito Ako	Margareth Posadas	
2012	Maalaala Mo Kaya	Christie	Episode: "Belen"
2013	Apoy sa Dagat	Odessa Villarosa-del Sol	
2014	Maalaala Mo Kaya	Gloria	Episode: "Harmonica"
2014	Ipaglaban Mo!	Candida	Episode: "Sa Aking Pagbangon"
2014	The Ryzza Mae Show	Herself	
2014	Give Love of Christmas	Rose Aguinaldo	Series title: The Gift Giver
2014	Maalaala Mo Kaya	Beth	Episode: "Salamin"
2015	Inday Bote	Fiona Vargas-Navarro	
2015	Ipaglaban Mo!	Belen	Episode: "Inabusong Inosente"
2015	Maalaala Mo Kaya	Myrna Cuenco	Episode: "Karaoke"
2015	Maalaala Mo Kaya	Sima	Episode: "Lubid"
2016	Maalaala Mo Kaya	Shirley Esguerra	Episode: "Backpack"
2016	The Story of Us	Carmy Santos-Manalo	
2016	Maalaala Mo Kaya	Marilyn "Bing" Concine	Episode: "Riles"
2016	Maalaala Mo Kaya	Amy	Episode: "Popcorn"
2016	Celebrity Playtime	Player on Team 90's	
2017–2018	Wildflower	Emilia Ardiente-Torillo	
2018	Bagani	Matadora / Bighani	
2018	Maalaala Mo Kaya	Rose	Episode: "Bantay Bata"
2019	StarStruck	Herself/Mentor	
2019	Dear Uge	Arlene	Episode: "Bahay Bangayan"
2019–2022	Prima Donnas	Ma. Kendra Fajardo-Claveria	
2021	I Can See You: #Future	Menchie Torres	
2021	Tadhana	Lileth	Episode: "Dalawa ang Aking Ina"
2022–2023	Mano Po Legacy: The Flower Sisters	Lily Y. Chua-Tan	
2024	Pamilya Sagrado	Atty. Divine Torres	
2024	ASAP Natin 'To	Herself / Performer	Co-host

=== TV commercials ===
- Rexona (May 1994)
- Pigromix (August 1984)

== Accolades ==
Awards and nominations received by Aiko Melendez
Award (Note: Awards, festivals, honors and other miscellaneous organizations are listed in alphabetical order.)	Year (Note: Indicates the year of ceremony. Each year is linked to the article about the awards held that year, wherever possible.)	Category	Nominated work	Result	Ref.
Dangal ng Lahi	2023	Outstanding Public Servant of the Year	Herself	Won	
FAMAS Awards	1983	Best Child Actress	Santa Claus Is Coming to Town!	Nominated	
FAMAS Awards	1993	Best Supporting Actress	Sinungaling Mong Puso	Nominated	
FAMAS Awards	1995	Best Actress	Maalaala Mo Kaya: The Movie	Nominated	
FAMAS Awards	2015	Best Actress	Asintado	Nominated	
FAMAS Awards	2017	Best Supporting Actress	Barcelona: A Love Untold	Nominated	
International Filmmaker Festival of World Cinema	2015	Best Actress	Asintado	Won	
International Film Festival Manhattan	2015	Best Actress	Asintado	Won	
Luna Awards	1994	Best Actress	May Minamahal	Nominated	
Luna Awards	1995	Best Actress	Maalaala Mo Kaya: The Movie	Nominated	
Luna Awards	2019	Best Supporting Actress	Rainbow's Sunset	Nominated	
Manila Film Festival	1994	Best Actress	Maalaala Mo Kaya: The Movie	Won	
Manila Film Festival	1995	Best Actress	Sa 'Yo Lamang	Won	
Metro Manila Film Festival	2018	Best Supporting Actress	Rainbow's Sunset	Won	
Saludo Excellence Awards	2023	National Outstanding Humanitarian and Leadership Service	Herself	Won	
Star Awards for Movies	2015	Movie Actress of the Year	Asintado	Nominated	
Star Awards for Movies	2018	Movie Supporting Actress of the Year	Pwera Usog	Nominated	
Star Awards for Movies	2019	Movie Supporting Actress of the Year	Rainbow's Sunset	Nominated	
Subic Bay International Film Festival	2019	Best Actress	Tell Me Your Dreams	Won	
Star Awards for Television	2011	Best Single Performance by an Actress	Maalaala Mo Kaya (Episode: "TV")	Nominated	
Star Awards for Television	2015	Best Drama Actress	Give Love on Christmas: The Gift Giver	Nominated	
Star Awards for Television	2016	Best Single Performance by an Actress	Maalaala Mo Kaya (Episode: "Lubid")	Nominated	
Star Awards for Television	2017	Best Drama Supporting Actress	Wildflower	Won	
Star Awards for Television	2021	Best Drama Supporting Actress	Prima Donnas	Won	
Star Awards for Television	2024	Best Drama Supporting Actress	Pamilya Sagrado	Nominated	
The EDDYS	2017	Best Supporting Actress	Barcelona: A Love Untold	Nominated	
The EDDYS	2019	Best Supporting Actress	Rainbow's Sunset	Nominated	

- Celebrity Inductee, Eastwood City Walk of Fame Philippines 2014 - Won
- Best Supporting Actress for Iadya Mo Kami, 15th Gawad Tanglaw Awards 2017
- Pinakapasadong Katuwang na Aktres for Iadya Mo Kami, 19th Gawad PASADO Awards
- Pinakapasadong Katuwang na Aktres for Rainbow's Sunset, 21st Gawad PASADO Awards
- Favorite Kontrabida for Prima Donnas, RAWR Awards 2020
