= Wendell Ramos =

Filipino actor (born 1978)

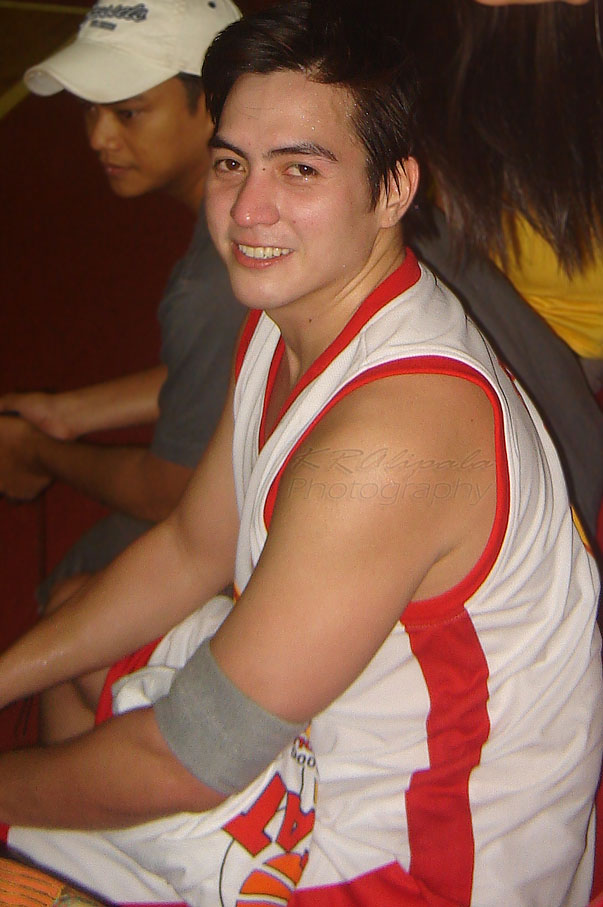
- Ramos in 2008
- Born: Carlino Xavier Reyes Ramos; August 18, 1978 (age 48); Tondo, Manila, Philippines
- Occupation: Actor
- Years active: 1995–present
- Agent(s): Sparkle (1995–2011; 2018–present) TV5 Network (2011–2014) ABS-CBN (2015–2018)
- Spouse: Kukai Guevara (m. 2017)
- Children: 3
- Relatives: Erik Santos (cousin)

Carlino Xavier Reyes Ramos (Tagalog: [ˈwɛndɛl ˈɾamos]; born August 18, 1978) is a Filipino actor. He is best known as one of the original cast members of the GMA Network comedy show Bubble Gang.

== Career ==
Ramos started his showbiz career in 1995 when he joined the cast of Bubble Gang along with his long time best friend Antonio Aquitania. He got into "matinee idol" status when he joined Click. He then had roles with female stars like Ara Mina and Diana Zubiri, among others, in different films during the 2000s. He then moved to GMA Network shows including Sinasamba Kita, La Vendetta, Kung Mahawi Man ang Ulap and Tasya Fantasya. His biggest break came when he played the role of Harvey in Ako si Kim Samsoon. Ramos is also one of the models of Bench along with famous stars such as Richard Gomez, Richard Gutierrez, and Francine Prieto.

In 2015, Ramos moved to ABS-CBN and stayed until 2018, when he decided to return to GMA Network.

== Business ==
In 2020, Ramos and Kukai Guevarra, his wife opened a frozen meat business, WenDeli Meat House, a company that sells ready to eat and ready to cook meat products which is available for online selling and re-selling abroad.

== Politics ==
Ramos ran for councilor of the 4th district of Manila in 2025 as an independent. However, he withdrew two weeks before the election, citing family and work commitments.

== Personal life ==
Ramos has three children with three different non-showbiz girlfriends. He married his partner Kukai Guevara on December 9, 2017.

Ramos has been a certified firefighter since 2020.

He is a third cousin of Kapamilya singer Erik Santos.

== Awards and nominations ==
Awards and nominations
Year	Award giving body	Category	Nominated work	Results
2002	Gawad Urian Awards	Best Supporting Actor (Pinakamahusay na Pangalawang Aktor)	Hubog (2001)	Included
2005	Gawad Urian Awards	Best Supporting Actor (Pinakamahusay na Pangalawang Aktor)	Sabel (2004)	Won
2007	FAMAS Awards	Best Supporting Actor	Sukob (2006)	Included
2008	Film Academy of the Philippines (FAP) Luna Awards	Best Supporting Actor	Happy Hearts (2007)	Included
2008	Golden Screen Awards, Philippines	Best Performance by an Actor in a Lead Role (Musical or Comedy)	Happy Hearts (2007)	Included
2019	Philippine Movie Press Club (PMPC) Star Awards for Television 2019	Best Drama Supporting Actor	Onanay	Included

== Filmography ==
=== Film ===
Year	Title	Role	Ref.
1996	Kabilin-bilinan ni Lola		
1996	Taguan	Lemuel	
1997	Nagmumurang Kamatis		
2001	Hubog	Oliver	
2001	Most Wanted		
2002	Gamitan	Nicolas Fernandez	
2002	Bedtime Stories		
2002	Two Timer	Andrei	
2002	Bakit Papa		
2003	Sex Drive	Winston/Philip	
2003	Keka	Jason Sanchez	
2003	Filipinas	Narciso Filipinas	
2004	Sabel	Sabel's rapist, Jojo	
2006	Sukob	Dale	
2007	Happy Hearts	Louie	
2007	Do-Se-Na		
2007	Desperadas	Dave Quinto	
2008	Shake, Rattle & Roll X	Monster	
2008	Desperadas 2	Dave, Diana	
2009	Oh, My Girl! A Laugh Story...		
2011	Wedding Tayo, Wedding Hindi	Benito "Ben" Matias	
2012	Corazon: Ang Unang Aswang	Ryan	
2012	El Presidente		
2013	Bayang Magiliw		
2015	Felix Manalo	Juanario Ponce	
2015	Beauty and the Bestie	Jojo	
2017	Minda		
2021	On the Job: The Missing 8	Pedring Eusebio's son	
2024	Green Bones	Jonathan Cruz	
TBA	Kuya: The Governor Edwin Jubahib Story		

=== Television ===
Year	Title	Role
1995–2011	Bubble Gang	Himself
1999–2002	Click	Benedict "Ben" Santillan
2001–2003	Sana ay Ikaw na Nga	Jose Enrique Altamonte
2002	Ooops!	Himself
2004	Marinara	Luis Iñigo
2004–2007	Bahay Mo Ba 'To?	Manny Boy Mulingtapang
2005	Mars Ravelo's Darna	Jeric Frias
2006	Agawin Mo Man ang Lahat	Tristan
2006–2007	Mars Ravelo's Captain Barbell	Blackout / Ruben
2007	Sine Novela: Sinasamba Kita	Jerry Sandoval
2007	Sine Novela: Kung Mahawi Man ang Ulap	Michael
2007–2008	La Vendetta	Rigo Bayani
2008	Mars Ravelo's Dyesebel	Tino Montemayor
2008	Carlo J. Caparas' Tasya Fantasya	Donald / Prince Federico
2008	Ako si Kim Samsoon	Harvey De Guzman
2008	Ang Spoiled	Dodong
2008	Sine Novela: Una Kang Naging Akin	Nick Adriano / Darwin Salvador
2008–2009	LaLola	Lazarro "Lalo" Lobregat / Fake Lalo
2009	Dear Friend : Magkaribal	Darell
2009	Adik Sa'Yo	James
2009–2010	Sine Novela: Kaya Kong Abutin ang Langit	Daryl Revilla
2010	SRO Cinemaserye: Hot Mama	Randy
2010	Claudine: Kahapon, Ngayon, at Bukas	Daniel
2010	JejeMom	Dindo Arañes
2010–2011	Jillian: Namamasko Po	Nelson Rivera
2011	Babaeng Hampaslupa	Harry Bautista
2011	Hapier Togeder	Cesar
2011	Rod Santiago's The Sisters	Dr. Arnel Moran
2011	Kris TV	Himself
2011–2012	Glamorosa	Nicolo "Nico" Gonzales-Rodrigo
2013	Kidlat	Rodel / Graba Man
2013	Undercover	Alex Velasco
2014	Confessions of a Torpe	Peter "Mr. Big" Malaqui
2015	Eat Bulaga Lenten Special: Aruga ng Puso	Dante
2015	Ipaglaban Mo: Dahil Mahal Mo Siya	Louis
2015	Aquino & Abunda Tonight	Himself
2015–2018	ASAP	Himself / Performer
2015–2016	Pasión de Amor	Gabriel Salcedo-Madrigal†
2016	Ipaglaban Mo: Sabwatan	Dave
2016	Maalaala Mo Kaya: Family Pictures	Max
2016	FPJ's Ang Probinsyano	Nelson Wong
2016	Ipaglaban Mo: Misyonaryo	Isagani
2017	Ipaglaban Mo!: Bugbog	Dante Martinez
2017–2018	Wildflower	Raul Torillo
2018	Wish Ko Lang	Manuel
2018	Stories for the Soul	Greg
2018	Inday Will Always Love You	Ferry Fuentes
2018	Magpakailanman: Sa Kamay ng Aking Ama	Brando
2018–2019	Onanay	Atty. Lucas Samonte
2019	Dear Uge	Tom
2019	Daddy's Gurl	Pinatubombs / Bulik
2019–2022	Prima Donnas	Jaime Antonio Claveria
2022	Love You Stranger	Javier Escalante
2023	AraBella	Gary
2023	Maging Sino Ka Man	Chad Macario
2024	It's Showtime	Himself / Performer
2024–2025	Shining Inheritance	Charlie Abrigo
2025	Lolong: Pangil ng Maynila	Paquito Magtalas
2025	Maka Lovestream: Pretty Little Baby	Paco
2025–2026	Encantadia Chronicles: Sang'gre	Memen
2026	Tadhana: Perlas	Ipe
2026	Never Say Die	Diego Aglipay
2026	Kamao	Caloy Olivares
