= Roxanne Barcelo =

Filipino-American actress, model and Singer (born 1985)

- Born: Anne Roxanne Barcelo (Note: Roxanne Barcelo was born in the United States of America. Thus, she does not possess her mother's maiden name which is Jordan.); January 20, 1985 (age 41); Fairfax, Virginia, U.S.
- Other names: Roxee B, Roxie, Roxanne Barcelo
- Occupations: Actress, model, host
- Years active: 1999–present
- Spouse: Jiggs (m. 2019)
- Children: 3
- Musical career
- Genre: OPM, pop
- Occupation: Singer
- Years active: 1999–present
- Label: Universal

Anne Roxanne Barcelo (born January 20, 1985), also known as Roxee B, is a Filipino-American actress, model and singer. In 2006, she became one of the 14 housemates of ABS-CBN's Pinoy Big Brother: Celebrity Edition. Before entering the Big Brother House, she was a finalist of ABC's Hollywood Dream. She is best known for playing Natalie Alcantara in Wildflower. Roxanne played the role of young Alba, an antagonist and guest character of Los Bastardos.

== Early life ==
Born in Fairfax, Virginia, she spent her childhood in the United States. She was only eight years old when she joined and won "Best of the Best", a singing contest in the United States. Her broadcasting talent was again put to the test when she became a member of ESPN Kids. Already a professional child model, she did TV commercials for the Smithsonian Museum's 150th anniversary, 4th of July, GAP and JC Penney.

== Acting and singing career ==
Upon arriving in the Philippines when she was 13, she joined as a contestant in GMA's Metropop Search. By 1999, Roxie became a mainstay in the GMA's then top-rated youth-oriented show, Click She also appeared in the television drama series Kahit Kailan and Sana Ay Ikaw Na Nga., was a regular host of SOP and guest-starred in several GMA shows. Her song "Kung Alam Mo Lang" (If You Only Knew), the Tagalog version of "Because I'm A Girl" (Korean: 여자 이니까; RR: Yeoja Inikka) by the South Korean female pop trio band Kiss topped the Philippine music charts. She also released a self-titled album, Roxie in 2004.

Barcelo starred in a contemporary full-length film, Mudraks, which was screened for competition in 2006's Cinemalaya Film Festival. She played the daughter of the lead actress, Rio Locsin. The movie is about a dysfunctional family who never talk to each other.

In 2008, she returned to GMA Network, her home channel, whose rival station is ABS-CBN, to do a children's program as one of the main hosts; she was referred to as Ate Anne in the show called Batang Bibbo!. But in early 2009 she was cast to the most awaited fantasy series starring Marian Rivera in Darna. After Darna, she appeared on First Time, together with Joross Gamboa and Michelle Madrigal who were also a former ABS-CBN talents. In 2010, Roxee returned to hosting a children's show via Art Angel on GMA with original host Tonypet Gaba, replacing the former hosts.

She joined Alodia Gosiengfiao for the July 2013 edition of FHM Philippines. In 2014, she appeared again for Online Babe for FHM (now as FHM #NewCrush and Idols) for June 2014 as well as in the December 2014 issue of FHM. In 2016, she transferred to Talent5 to appear in Bakit Manipis ang Ulap?. In 2017, she returned to ABS-CBN, to play an antagonist role in Wildflower. In 2018, she played a young Alba in Los Bastardos.

== Personal life ==
Barcelo graduated from the School of the Holy Spirit in Quezon City and from Miriam College, also in Quezon City. In 2020, she married a non-showbiz personality in a private ceremony. She has three sons.

== Filmography ==
=== Film ===
Year	Title	Role
2010	You to Me Are Everything	Lily
2015	Tragic Theater	Arlene De Lara
2015	Felix Manalo	Praxedes Ysagun
2017	Siargao	Belay
2018	Abay Babes	Goldie
2019	The Panti Sisters	Kat

=== Television ===
Year	Title	Role	Notes
1999	Click	Toni	Main role
1999	Dear Mikee	Various	
1999	Ibang Klase	Various	
2000	SOP	Herself	Co-host / Performer
2000	GMA Telesine Specials	Various	
2000	Super Klenk	Various	
2000	Campus Romance	Various	Lead cast
2000	GMA Love Stories	Various	Lead role
2001	Sana ay Ikaw na Nga	Eloisa Fulgencio	Supporting role
2001	Maynila	Various	Main cast
2002	Kahit Kailan	Eden Miseracordia	Supporting cast
2002	Magpakailanman	Various	
2003–2008; 2017–2022	ASAP	Herself	Guest performer
2005	Hollywood Dream	Herself	
2006	Pinoy Big Brother: Celebrity Edition 1	Herself	Celebrity housemate
2006	Maalaala Mo Kaya	Various	
2008	Kahit Isang Saglit	Trisha	Supporting role
2008	The Singing Bee	Herself	Celebrity Player
2008–2009	Batang Bibbo!	Ate Anne / Herself	Host
2009	Mars Ravelo's Darna	Aleli	Supporting role
2010	First Time	Ms. Berna	Supporting role
2010	Art Angel	Ate Anne / Herself	Host
2010–2012	Reel Love: Tween Hearts	Rose Diones	Supporting role
2011	Amaya	Kayang	Supporting role
2012	Cielo de Angelina	Elaine	Supporting role
2016	Bakit Manipis ang Ulap?	Katrina Alarcon	Main cast
2016	Karelasyon: Rigodon	Lyca	Episode role
2016	Wagas	Blessie	Episode role
2017–2018	Wildflower	Natalie Alcantara	Main cast
2018	Ipaglaban Mo: Puri	Sarah Macaraeg	Episode guest
2018	Precious Hearts Romances Presents: Los Bastardos	young Alba	Special Participation / Antagonist
2018	Pinoy Big Brother: Otso	Herself	Opening Guest Performer with Ex Housemates
2018	Brush	Alex	Main cast
2019	Ipaglaban Mo: Kubli	Lisa Domingo-Morales	Episode role
2019	Tawag ng Tanghalan: Celebrity Champions	Herself	Contender
2020	Fluid	Mitch	Main cast

== Discography ==
=== Album ===
- Roxie (2004), Universal Records

=== Songs ===
- "WOW" featuring Q-York (2014)
- "Morena" (2014), Viva Records
