= Sunshine Cruz =

Filipino actress and singer (born 1977)

- Born: Sunshine Braden Cruz; July 18, 1977 (age 49); Manila, Philippines
- Other name: Shine
- Occupations: Actress; singer
- Years active: 1992–present
- Agent: ALV Talent Circuit
- Known for: part of the Cruz clan in Philippine show business
- Spouse: Cesar Montano (m. 2000; ann. 2018)
- Children: 3
- Relatives: Donna Cruz (cousin); Sheryl Cruz (cousin); Geneva Cruz (cousin); Rodjun Cruz (cousin); Rayver Cruz (cousin); Tirso Cruz III (uncle); Ricky Belmonte (uncle)

Sunshine Braden Cruz (Tagalog pronunciation: [ˈkɾus]; born July 18, 1977) is a Filipino actress and singer. She is part of the Cruz family of actors.

== Personal life ==
Cruz married actor and director Cesar Montano on September 14, 2000. They have three daughters: Angelina Isabelle, Samantha Angelene "Sam", and Angel Franchesca "Chesca". In 2013, the couple separated and in 2018, the marriage was annulled by the Quezon City Court.

In 2016, she dated Ara Mina's half-brother Macky Mathay, but she admitted their breakup in 2022.

In 2024, businessman Atong Ang confirmed that he was in a relationship with Cruz.

In 2025, Cruz disclosed that she had been diagnosed with myasthenia gravis.

== Filmography ==
=== Film ===
Year	Title	Role
1992	First Time... Like a Virgin!	
1992	Guwapings: The First Adventure	Dolores
1992	Shake, Rattle & Roll IV: "Ang Guro"	Gretch
1993	Humanda ka Mayor!: Bahala na ang Diyos	Myra Bernardo
1993	Dino... Abangan Ang Susunod Na...	
1993	Ano Ba 'Yan 2	Carolina
1993	Aguinaldo	
1993	Galvez: Hanggang sa Dulo ng Mundo Hahanapin Kita	
1993	Pandoy: Alalay ng Panday	Vibora
1993	Teenage Mama	
1994	Junior Police	Imelda
1994	Baby Paterno: Dugong Pulis	Anabelle Morales
1995	The Marita Gonzaga Rape-Slay: In God We Trust!	Marita Gonzaga
1995	Oha! Ako Pa?!	Yvette
1995	Kahit Harangan ng Bala	Jojo
1995	Costales	Minda Costales
1995	Wilson Sorronda: Leader Kuratong Baleleng's Solid Group	Minerva
1996	Virgin People 2	
1996	Sa Bingit ng Kamatayan	Susan
1996	Medrano	Lyka
1996	Ang Titser Kong Pogi	Cynthia
1996	Adan Lazaro	Rowena Reyes
1997	Paano Kung Wala Ka Na?	
1997	Lihim ni Madonna	Madonna
1997	Enteng en Mokong: Kaming Mga Mababaw ang Kaligayahan	
1997	Babangon Ang Huling Patak ng Dugo	Alieta
1997	Ang Pinakamahabang Baba sa Balat ng Lupa	Lani
1998	Magagandang Hayop	Rowena
1998	Ama Namin	Ka Celia / Ka Lilia
1998	Init ng Laman	Laila
1999	Ang Kabit ni Mrs. Montero	Annie Sugay
1999	Ibibigay Ko ang Lahat	Lucy
1999	Bullet	Mabel
1999	Ekis: Walang Tatakas	Dolor
2000	Pag Oras Mo, Oras Mo Na	Atty. Montero
2001	Alas-Dose	May Vergara
2002	Sunshine	
2006	Inang Yaya	May
2006	Ligalig	Trixie
2012	Biktima	Jane
2015	Just The Way You Are	Cecille
2017	Mang Kepweng Returns	Via Rivera
2019	Mystified	Hellga
2019	The Heiress	Carmen
2022	A Affair To Forget (Vivamax original movie)	Rowena Ramos

=== Television ===
Year	Title	Role
1992	Valiente	young Leona Braganza
1992–1996	That's Entertainment	Herself
1995–1999	Bubble Gang	Herself
1999	L	Claire Celerio
2002–2004	Kapalaran	Herself
2004	Marina	Reyna Istah
2007	Asian Treasures	Esmeralda
2007–2008	Mars Ravelo's Lastikman	Susan Navarro / Mothra
2008	Palos	Grazella Caranzo y Reviera
2012	Be Careful With My Heart	Alexandra "Alex" Lim
2013	Carlo J. Caparas' Dugong Buhay	Isabel De Lara
2013–2014	Jim Fernandez's Galema, Anak Ni Zuma	Isabel Carriedo-Castillo / Malena
2013	Toda Max	Mrs. Catacutan
2014	Pure Love	Lorraine Santos
2015	Oh My G!	Maria Lucilla "Lucy" Zaldivar-Santiago
2016	Dolce Amore	Alice Urtola
2016	Dear Uge: Burol in this Together	Rafa
2017–2018	Wildflower	Camia Delos Santos-Cruz / Jasmine
2018	Kapag Nahati ang Puso	Rosario "Rio" Matias / Rio Fonacier-Del Valle
2018	Dear Uge: Pasiklaban sa Lamayan	Kim
2019	Hiwaga ng Kambat	Melissa Enriquez-Baron
2020	Love Thy Woman	Rebecca "Kai" Estrella
2020–2021	Bagong Umaga	Margaret "Maggie" Buencorazon-Veradona
2021	Stories from the Heart: Love on Air	Deborah Gutierrez
2022	Mano Po Legacy: The Family Fortune	Cristine Chan
2022	Tadhana: Babawiin Ko Ang Langit	Agatha
2023	Underage	Maria Elena "Lena" Serrano
2023	Unbreak My Heart	Christina Romualdez-Zhang
2024	It's Showtime	Herself

Preceded by Empress Schuck	FHM Cover Girl (April 2013)	Succeeded by Ryza Cenon
